= 2024 4 Hours of Dubai =

Endurance sportscar racing event

The Grand Prix layout of the Dubai Autodrome

The 2024 4 Hours of Dubai was an endurance sportscar racing event held between 2 and 4 February 2024 at Dubai Autodrome in Dubai, United Arab Emirates. It was the third round of 2023–24 Asian Le Mans Series season.

== Schedule ==
Date	Time (local: GST)	Event
Friday, 2 February	14:45	Free Practice 1
Saturday, 3 February	10:10	Free Practice 2
Saturday, 3 February	14:30	Qualifying
Sunday, 4 February	13:00	Race

== Entry list ==
The entry list was published on 24 January and consisted of 42 entries in 3 categories – 13 in LMP2, 6 in LMP3 and 23 in GT.

In comparison to the previous round there were four new entrants and one withdrawal. GG Classic Cars entered a Ligier JS P320 with George Nakas and Fraser Ross as its drivers. Dragon Racing did field a Ferrari 296 GT3 with Rui Andrade, Nicola Marinangeli and Marco Pulcini behind the wheel. Nielsen Racing and COOL Racing each did field one Oreca 07. Matt Bell, Patrick Liddy and Blake McDonald raced for Nielsen Racing while Alexandre Coigny, Vladislav Lomko and Lorenzo Fluxá drove for COOL Racing. Craft-Bamboo Racing withdrew from remaining rounds of the season.

The No. 56 Team Project 1 withdrew after Sean Gelael took an opportunity to substitute Paul Evrard in the No. 43 Saintéloc Racing

== Free practice ==
- Only the fastest car in each class is shown.

Free Practice 1	Class	No.	Entrant	Time
Free Practice 1	LMP2	22	(Germany) Proton Competition	1:49.386
Free Practice 1	LMP3	2	(Spain) CD Sport	1:54.605
Free Practice 1	GT	21	(Italy) AF Corse	1:58.931
Free Practice 2	Class	No.	Entrant	Time
Free Practice 2	LMP2	25	(Portugal) Algarve Pro Racing	1:48.104
Free Practice 2	LMP3	26	(Czech Republic) Bretton Racing	1:54.884
Free Practice 2	GT	86	(United Kingdom) GR Racing	1:58.067

== Qualifying ==
=== Qualifying Results ===
Pole position winners in each class are marked in bold.

Pos	Class	No.	Team	Driver	Time	Gap	Grid
1	**LMP2**	**55**	**(Germany) Proton Competition**	**(United States) P. J. Hyett**	**1:48.873**	—	1
2	LMP2	99	(Jordan) 99 Racing	(Oman) Ahmad Al Harthy	1:48.919	+0.046	2
3	LMP2	90	(United Kingdom) TF Sport	(Turkey) Salih Yoluç	1:49.131	+0.258	3
4	LMP2	22	(Germany) Proton Competition	(Italy) Giorgio Roda	1:49.270	+0.397	4
5	LMP2	30	(France) Duqueine Team	(United States) John Falb	1:49.688	+0.815	5
6	LMP2	83	(Italy) AF Corse	(France) François Perrodo	1:50.036	+1.163	6
7	LMP2	4	(Portugal) CrowdStrike Racing by APR	(United States) George Kurtz	1:50.182	+1.309	7
8	LMP2	3	(Luxembourg) DKR Engineering	(Germany) Alexander Mattschull	1:50.231	+1.358	8
9	LMP2	47	(Switzerland) Cool Racing	(Switzerland) Alexandre Coigny	1:50.813	+1.940	9
10	LMP2	25	(Portugal) Algarve Pro Racing	(United States) Chris McMurry	1:51.020	+2.147	10
11	LMP2	34	(United Kingdom) Nielsen Racing	(United States) Blake McDonald	1:51.350	+2.477	11
12	LMP2	24	(United Kingdom) Nielsen Racing	(United Kingdom) Ian Loggie	1:51.582	+2.709	12
13	LMP2	44	(Slovakia) ARC Bratislava	(Slovakia) Miro Konôpka	1:52.887	+4.014	13
14	**LMP3**	**17**	**(Switzerland) Cool Racing**	**(Saint Kitts and Nevis) Alexander Bukhantsov**	**1:55.118**	**+6.245**	14
15	LMP3	26	(Czech Republic) Bretton Racing	(Algeria) Julien Gerbi	1:55.457	+6.584	15
16	LMP3	20	(Denmark) High Class Racing	(Iceland) Auðunn Guðmundsson	1:55.806	+6.933	16
17	LMP3	2	(Spain) CD Sport	(United Kingdom) Nick Adcock	1:56.068	+7.195	17
18	**GT**	**7**	**(Oman) Al Manar Racing by GetSpeed**	**(China) Anthony Liu**	**1:58.280**	**+9.407**	20
19	GT	42	(France) Saintéloc Racing	(France) Alban Varutti	1:58.411	+9.538	21
20	GT	91	(Lithuania) Pure Rxcing	(Saint Kitts and Nevis) Alex Malykhin	1:58.824	+9.951	22
21	GT	69	(United Kingdom) Optimum Motorsport	James Cottingham	1:59.129	+10.256	23
22	GT	88	(Australia) Triple Eight	(Malaysia) Prince Jefri Ibrahim	1:59.339	+10.466	24
23	GT	19	(Germany) Leipert Motorsport	(Italy) Gabriel Rindone	1:59.346	+10.473	25
24	GT	9	(Germany) GetSpeed	(Austria) Martin Konrad	1:59.385	+10.512	26
25	GT	27	(United Kingdom) Optimum Motorsport	(United Kingdom) Mark Radcliffe	1:59.412	+10.539	27
26	GT	66	(Germany) Attempto Racing	Andrey Mukovoz	1:59.639	+10.766	28
27	GT	43	(France) Saintéloc Racing	(China) Zhou Bihuang	1:59.820	+10.947	29
28	GT	98	(United Arab Emirates) Dragon Racing	(Italy) Marco Pulcini	1:59.877	+11.004	30
29	GT	93	(Germany) Team Project 1	(United Kingdom) Darren Leung	1:59.949	+11.076	31
30	GT	33	(Germany) Herberth Motorsport	(Hong Kong) Antares Au	2:00.036	+11.163	32
31	GT	21	(Italy) AF Corse	(France) François Heriau	2:00.155	+11.282	33
32	GT	77	(Japan) D'Station Racing	(Japan) Satoshi Hoshino	2:00.370	+11.497	34
33	GT	82	(Italy) AF Corse	(France) Charles-Henri Samani	2:01.084	+12.211	35
34	LMP3	58	(Australia) GG Classic Cars	(Australia) George Nakas	2:01.319	+12.446	18
35	GT	11	(Germany) Attempto Racing	(Canada) Ilya Gorbatsky	2:01.392	+12.519	36
36	GT	8	(New Zealand) EBM	(Indonesia) Setiawan Santoso	2:01.575	+12.702	37
37	GT	95	(United Kingdom) TF Sport	(United Kingdom) John Hartshorne	2:01.722	+12.849	38
38	GT	86	(United Kingdom) GR Racing	(United Kingdom) Michael Wainwright	2:01.746	+12.873	39
39	GT	75	(Germany) Team Motopark	(Germany) Heiko Neumann	2:01.767	+12.894	40
40	LMP3	65	(Malaysia) Viper Niza Racing	(Malaysia) Douglas Khoo	2:02.381	+13.508	19
41	GT	84	(New Zealand) EBM	(Malaysia) Adrian D'Silva	2:03.271	+14.398	41

== Race ==
=== Race result ===
The minimum number of laps for classification (70% of overall winning car's distance) was 83 laps. Class winners are marked in bold.

Final Classification
Pos	Class	No.	Team	Drivers	Car	Tyres	Laps	Time/Gap
1	**LMP2**	**99**	**(Jordan) 99 Racing**	**(Oman) Ahmad Al Harthy; Nikita Mazepin (Switzerland) Louis Delétraz**	**Oreca 07**	MI	**119**	**4:01:25.599**
2	LMP2	22	(Germany) Proton Competition	(Italy) Giorgio Roda (France) Julien Andlauer (Austria) René Binder	Oreca 07	MI	119	+3.499
3	LMP2	4	(Portugal) CrowdStrike Racing by APR	(United States) George Kurtz (United States) Colin Braun (Denmark) Malthe Jakobsen	Oreca 07	MI	119	+6.520
4	LMP2	3	(Luxembourg) DKR Engineering	(Germany) Alexander Mattschull (France) Tom Dillmann (Germany) Laurents Hörr	Oreca 07	MI	119	+31.280
5	LMP2	90	(United Kingdom) TF Sport	(Turkey) Salih Yoluç (United States) Michael Dinan (Republic of Ireland) Charlie Eastwood	Oreca 07	MI	119	+40.502
6	LMP2	25	(Portugal) Algarve Pro Racing	(United States) Chris McMurry (United Kingdom) Freddie Tomlinson (United Kingdom) Toby Sowery	Oreca 07	MI	119	+44.561
7	LMP2	55	(Germany) Proton Competition	(United States) P. J. Hyett (United Kingdom) Harry Tincknell (France) Paul-Loup Chatin	Oreca 07	MI	119	+45.576
8	LMP2	83	(Italy) AF Corse	(France) François Perrodo (France) Matthieu Vaxivière (Italy) Alessio Rovera	Oreca 07	MI	119	+54.303
9	LMP2	24	(United Kingdom) Nielsen Racing	(United Kingdom) Ian Loggie (Mexico) Alejandro García (United Kingdom) Will Stevens	Oreca 07	MI	118	+1 Lap
10	LMP2	44	(Slovakia) ARC Bratislava	(Slovakia) Miro Konôpka (Switzerland) Mathias Beche (Germany) Jonas Ried	Oreca 07	MI	118	+1 Lap
11	LMP2	34	(United Kingdom) Nielsen Racing	(United States) Blake McDonald (United States) Patrick Liddy (United Kingdom) Matthew Bell	Oreca 07	MI	118	+1 Lap
12	**LMP3**	**17**	**(Switzerland) Cool Racing**	**(United Kingdom) James Winslow (Saint Kitts and Nevis) Alexander Bukhantsov**	**Ligier JS P320**	MI	**114**	**+5 Laps**
13	LMP3	2	(Spain) CD Sport	(Denmark) Michael Jensen (United Kingdom) Nick Adcock (France) Fabien Lavergne	Ligier JS P320	MI	114	+5 Laps
14	LMP3	20	(Denmark) High Class Racing	(Iceland) Auðunn Guðmundsson (Denmark) Anders Fjordbach (United States) Seth Lucas	Ligier JS P320	MI	114	+5 Laps
15	LMP3	26	(Czech Republic) Bretton Racing	(Australia) John Corbett (Algeria) Julien Gerbi (Romania) Mihnea Ștefan	Ligier JS P320	MI	113	+6 Laps
16	**GT**	**91**	**(Lithuania) Pure Rxcing**	**(Saint Kitts and Nevis) Alex Malykhin (Austria) Klaus Bachler (Germany) Joel Sturm**	**Porsche 911 GT3 R (992)**	MI	**112**	**+7 Laps**
17	GT	7	(Oman) Al Manar Racing by GetSpeed	(Oman) Al Faisal Al Zubair (China) Anthony Liu (Germany) Fabian Schiller	Mercedes-AMG GT3 Evo	MI	112	+7 Laps
18	GT	21	(Italy) AF Corse	(United States) Simon Mann (France) François Heriau (Italy) Davide Rigon	Ferrari 296 GT3	MI	112	+7 Laps
19	GT	43	(France) Saintéloc Racing	(Germany) Dennis Marschall (China) Zhou Bihuang (Indonesia) Sean Gelael	Audi R8 LMS Evo II	MI	112	+7 Laps
20	GT	88	(Australia) Triple Eight	(Malaysia) Prince Jefri Ibrahim (Australia) Jordan Love (Germany) Luca Stolz	Mercedes-AMG GT3 Evo	MI	112	+7 Laps
21	GT	27	(United Kingdom) Optimum Motorsport	(United Kingdom) Mark Radcliffe (United Kingdom) Rob Bell (United Kingdom) Ollie Millroy	McLaren 720S GT3 Evo	MI	112	+7 Laps
22	GT	93	(Germany) Team Project 1	(United Kingdom) Darren Leung (United States) Christian Bogle (United Kingdom) Dan Harper	BMW M4 GT3	MI	112	+7 Laps
23	GT	86	(United Kingdom) GR Racing	(United Kingdom) Michael Wainwright (United Kingdom) Benjamin Barker (Italy) Riccardo Pera	Ferrari 296 GT3	MI	112	+7 Laps
24	GT	33	(Germany) Herberth Motorsport	(Hong Kong) Antares Au (Germany) Tim Heinemann (Germany) Laurin Heinrich	Porsche 911 GT3 R (992)	MI	112	+7 Laps
25	GT	95	(United Kingdom) TF Sport	(United Kingdom) John Hartshorne (United Kingdom) Ben Tuck (United Kingdom) Jonathan Adam	Aston Martin Vantage AMR GT3	MI	111	+8 Laps
26	GT	82	(Italy) AF Corse	(France) Charles-Henri Samani (France) Emmanuel Collard (Japan) Kei Cozzolino	Ferrari 296 GT3	MI	111	+8 Laps
27	GT	8	(New Zealand) EBM	(Indonesia) Setiawan Santoso (Thailand) Tanart Sathienthirakul (Denmark) Bastian Buus	Porsche 911 GT3 R (992)	MI	111	+8 Laps
28	GT	75	(Germany) Team Motopark	(Austria) Lukas Dunner (Germany) Heiko Neumann (Denmark) Morten Strømsted	Mercedes-AMG GT3 Evo	MI	111	+8 Laps
29	GT	98	(United Arab Emirates) Dragon Racing	(Angola) Rui Andrade (Italy) Nicola Marinangeli (Italy) Marco Pulcini	Ferrari 296 GT3	MI	110	+9 Laps
30	GT	84	(New Zealand) EBM	(Malaysia) Adrian D'Silva (China) Kerong Li (New Zealand) Earl Bamber	Porsche 911 GT3 R (992)	MI	108	+11 Laps
31	LMP3	58	(Australia) GG Classic Cars	(Australia) Fraser Ross (Australia) George Nakas	Ligier JS P320	MI	103	+16 Laps
Not classified
	GT	9	(Germany) GetSpeed	(United States) Anthony Bartone (United Kingdom) Aaron Walker (Austria) Martin Konrad	Mercedes-AMG GT3 Evo	MI	86	Damage
	GT	11	(Germany) Attempto Racing	Alexey Nesov; Sergey Titarenko (Canada) Ilya Gorbatsky	Audi R8 LMS Evo II	MI	81	Retired
	LMP2	30	(France) Duqueine Team	(United States) John Falb (Thailand) Carl Bennett (Denmark) Oliver Rasmussen	Oreca 07	MI	78	Wheel
	GT	42	(France) Saintéloc Racing	(Germany) Christopher Haase (Belgium) Gilles Magnus (France) Alban Varutti	Audi R8 LMS Evo II	MI	78	Mechanical
	GT	77	(Japan) D'Station Racing	(Japan) Satoshi Hoshino (Japan) Tomonobu Fujii (United Kingdom) Casper Stevenson	Aston Martin Vantage AMR GT3	MI	73	Collision
	GT	66	(Germany) Attempto Racing	(Luxembourg) Dylan Pereira (Germany) Alex Aka; Andrey Mukovoz	Audi R8 LMS Evo II	MI	73	Collision
	GT	19	(Germany) Leipert Motorsport	(Italy) Gabriel Rindone (New Zealand) Brendon Leitch (Italy) Marco Mapelli	Lamborghini Huracán GT3 Evo 2	MI	49	Damage
	LMP2	47	(Switzerland) Cool Racing	(Switzerland) Alexandre Coigny (France) Vladislav Lomko (Spain) Lorenzo Fluxá	Oreca 07	MI	1	Collision
	LMP3	65	(Malaysia) Viper Niza Racing	(Malaysia) Douglas Khoo (Malaysia) Dominic Ang	Ligier JS P320	MI	0	Collision
	GT	69	(United Kingdom) Optimum Motorsport	(United Kingdom) Sam De Haan (United Kingdom) James Cottingham (United Kingdom) Tom Gamble	McLaren 720S GT3 Evo	MI	0	Collision

=== Statistics ===
==== Fastest lap ====
Class	Driver	Team	Time	Lap
LMP2	(Denmark) Malthe Jakobsen	(Portugal) #4 CrowdStrike Racing by APR	1:47.824	92
LMP3	(Denmark) Anders Fjordbach	(Denmark) #20 High Class Racing	1:56.141	91
GT	(Italy) Riccardo Pera	(United Kingdom) #86 GR Racing	1:58.547	85
