= 99 Racing =

Jordanian-British racing team

(Jordan) (United Kingdom) 99 Racing
- Founded: 2022
- Founder(s): Dan Hodder; Nikita Mazepin
- Base: Silverstone, United Kingdom
- Team principal(s): Dan Hodder (2023–2024); Nikita Mazepin
- Current series: Russian Rally-Raid Championship
- Former series: Asian Le Mans Series
- Noted drivers: (Oman) Ahmad Al Harthy; Nikita Mazepin

99 Racing is a Jordanian-British sports car racing team that currently competes in the Russian Rally-Raid Championship and previously competed in the LMP2 class of the Asian Le Mans Series. For their first year of existence, the team raced under the British flag before switching to the Jordanian flag for the 2023–24 Asian Le Mans Series. The team was founded in 2022 by former Hitech Grand Prix employee Dan Hodder and ex-F1 driver Nikita Mazepin.

== History ==
99 Racing was founded in December 2022 by Russian former Formula One driver Nikita Mazepin and former Hitech Grand Prix employee Dan Hodder in conjunction with Mazepin's new events company, The Ninety Nine Events. Hodder was appointed as the team's sporting director. The team announced that it would make their competitive debut in the 2023 Asian Le Mans Series competing in the LMP2 class. 99 Racing have a base located in Silverstone near Hitech Grand Prix's base.

=== Asian Le Mans Series ===
==== 2023 ====
99 Racing made their debut in the 2023 Asian Le Mans Series in the LMP2 class. The team would field the No. 98 Oreca 07 in collaboration with Algarve Pro Racing and Hitech Grand Prix. 99 Racing intended to use the number 99, however, Herberth Motorsport was already using the number 99 in their entry, so 99 Racing opted to use the No. 98. The team originally signed Ben Barnicoat, Nikita Mazepin, and Félix Porteiro to drive the car for the season. Due to contractual obligations, Barnicoat withdrew from the team prior to the start of the season. He was replaced by Neel Jani. The team's nominated bronze-rated driver, Félix Porteiro, also had to withdraw after he was retroactively reclassified as silver shortly before the event. Warren Hughes was initially called up to replace Porteiro, but a documentation issue for Hughes resulted in Gonçalo Gomes eventually being drafted in.

In the opening round of the season at Dubai, the team finished third in their debut race. Following the first two races of the season, Gomes was replaced by Ahmad Al Harthy for the remainder of the season. 99 Racing rounded off their debut season with two poles and one podium in the final round at the Yas Marina Circuit.

==== 2023–24 ====
The team returned to the series for the 2023–24 Asian Le Mans Series, fielding the No. 99 Oreca 07 for Ahmad Al Harthy, Louis Delétraz, and Nikita Mazepin. 99 Racing partnered up with TF Sport, with Tom Ferrier's outfit preparing the car and Hitech again providing technical support. The team changed its licence from the United Kingdom to Jordan due to Jordanian former racing driver Sanad Shannak and his connections with Nikita Mazepin.

99 Racing would get their maiden victory in the series in the first race held at Sepang International Circuit. They followed this up with a second place in the second race at Sepang, and a second win at the 4 Hours of Dubai. Going into the final round of the series at Abu Dhabi, the No. 99 held the championship lead with 68 points ahead of second place No. 4 Crowdstrike Racing by APR with 48 points.

Prior to the final round, Mazepin had told the team that he was feeling unwell and would be unable to drive the final two races, thus, Filipe Albuquerque was brought in as his replacement. The weekend started off well with pole position in both races, however, the first race did not go to plan as the No. 99 piloted by Al Harthy was spun by the No. 90 TF Sport of Salih Yoluç. This was compounded by Al Harthy getting a drive-through penalty for rejoining the track unsafely. Later on in the race during a safety car period, Al Harthy collided with GT points leader Alex Malykhin in the No. 91 Pure Rxcing Porsche 911 GT3 R. This crash would cause Al Harthy to retire from the race. Championship rivals No. 4 Crowdstrike Racing by APR would go on to win the race and claim the championship lead. Going into the final race of the season, the No. 99 started on pole once again with Ahmad Al Harthy behind the wheel. However, their race would immediately be undone due to receiving a stop and go penalty for causing a collision in race one. The No. 99 spent the rest of the race in the back of the pack, and would go on to finish 11th. With the No. 4 finishing the final race in fifth, this would be enough for Crowdstrike Racing by APR to take the title. The No. 99 would come up short of the title, finishing third in the LMP2 teams championship.

== Racing record ==
=== Complete Asian Le Mans Series results ===
(key) (Races in bold indicate pole position; races in italics indicate fastest lap)

Year	Entrant	Class	No	Chassis	Engine	Drivers	1	2	3	4	5	Pos.	Pts
2023	(United Kingdom) 99 Racing	LMP2	98	Oreca 07	Gibson GK-428 4.2 L V8	(Switzerland) Neel Jani; Nikita Mazepin (Portugal) Gonçalo Gomes (Oman) Ahmad Al Harthy	DUB; 1; 3	DUB; 2; 6	**ABU**; **1**; 7	**ABU**; **2**; 2		4th	49
2023–24	(Jordan) 99 Racing	LMP2	99	Oreca 07	Gibson GK-428 4.2 L V8	(Oman) Ahmad Al Harthy (Switzerland) Louis Delétraz; Nikita Mazepin (Portugal) Filipe Albuquerque	SEP; 1; 1	SEP; 2; 2	DUB; 1	**ABU**; **1** Ret	**ABU**; **2**; 11	3rd	70
