= 2023–24 Asian Le Mans Series =

Sports car racing series

The 2023–24 Asian Le Mans Series was the twelfth season of the Automobile Club de l'Ouest's Asian Le Mans Series. It is the fourth 24 Hours of Le Mans-based series created by the ACO, following the American Le Mans Series (since merged with the Rolex Sports Car Series to form the United SportsCar Championship), the European Le Mans Series and the FIA World Endurance Championship. The five-event season began at the Sepang International Circuit in Sepang on 2 December 2023 and concluded at the Yas Marina Circuit in Abu Dhabi on 11 February 2024.

== Calendar ==
The calendar for the 2023–24 season was announced on the official website 9 June 2023. This Asian Le Mans Series season will return to Southeast Asia for the first time since the 2019–20 season. The first two races will be held at the Sepang International Circuit in December 2023, before moving to United Arab Emirates at the Dubai Autodrome in Dubai and Yas Marina Circuit in Abu Dhabi in February 2024.

The season will comprise five four-hour length races, run on the three circuits.

| Rnd | Race | Circuit | Location | Date |
|---|---|---|---|---|
| 1 | 4 Hours of Sepang | (Malaysia) Sepang International Circuit | Sepang, Selangor, Malaysia | 2 December 2023 |
| 2 | 4 Hours of Sepang | (Malaysia) Sepang International Circuit | Sepang, Selangor, Malaysia | 3 December 2023 |
| 3 | 4 Hours of Dubai | (United Arab Emirates) Dubai Autodrome | Dubailand, Dubai, UAE | 4 February 2024 |
| 4 | 4 Hours of Abu Dhabi | (United Arab Emirates) Yas Marina Circuit | Yas Island, Abu Dhabi, UAE | 10 February 2024 |
| 5 | 4 Hours of Abu Dhabi | (United Arab Emirates) Yas Marina Circuit | Yas Island, Abu Dhabi, UAE | 11 February 2024 |
Map of circuit locations
2023–24 Asian Le Mans Series is located in Asia

== Entry list ==
=== LMP2 ===
All cars in the LMP2 class use the Gibson GK428 V8 engine and Michelin tyres.

| Entrant/Team | Car | No. | Drivers | Rounds |
|---|---|---|---|---|
| (Luxembourg) DKR Engineering | Oreca 07 | 3 | (France) Tom Dillmann | All |
| (Luxembourg) DKR Engineering | Oreca 07 | 3 | (Germany) Laurents Hörr | All |
| (Luxembourg) DKR Engineering | Oreca 07 | 3 | (Germany) Alexander Mattschull | All |
| (Portugal) CrowdStrike Racing by APR | Oreca 07 | 4 | (United States) Colin Braun | All |
| (Portugal) CrowdStrike Racing by APR | Oreca 07 | 4 | (Denmark) Malthe Jakobsen | All |
| (Portugal) CrowdStrike Racing by APR | Oreca 07 | 4 | (United States) George Kurtz | All |
| (Portugal) Algarve Pro Racing | Oreca 07 | 25 | (United States) Chris McMurry | All |
| (Portugal) Algarve Pro Racing | Oreca 07 | 25 | (United Kingdom) Toby Sowery | All |
| (Portugal) Algarve Pro Racing | Oreca 07 | 25 | (United Kingdom) Freddie Tomlinson | All |
| (Germany) Proton Competition | Oreca 07 | 22 | (France) Julien Andlauer | All |
| (Germany) Proton Competition | Oreca 07 | 22 | (Austria) René Binder | All |
| (Germany) Proton Competition | Oreca 07 | 22 | (Italy) Giorgio Roda | All |
| (Germany) Proton Competition | Oreca 07 | 55 | (France) Paul-Loup Chatin | All |
| (Germany) Proton Competition | Oreca 07 | 55 | (United States) P. J. Hyett | All |
| (Germany) Proton Competition | Oreca 07 | 55 | (United Kingdom) Harry Tincknell | All |
| (United Kingdom) Nielsen Racing | Oreca 07 | 24 | (Mexico) Alex García | All |
| (United Kingdom) Nielsen Racing | Oreca 07 | 24 | (United Kingdom) Ian Loggie | All |
| (United Kingdom) Nielsen Racing | Oreca 07 | 24 | (Austria) Ferdinand Habsburg | 1–2, 4–5 |
| (United Kingdom) Nielsen Racing | Oreca 07 | 24 | (United Kingdom) Will Stevens | 3 |
| (United Kingdom) Nielsen Racing | Oreca 07 | 34 | (United Kingdom) Matt Bell | 3–5 |
| (United Kingdom) Nielsen Racing | Oreca 07 | 34 | (United States) Patrick Liddy | 3–5 |
| (United Kingdom) Nielsen Racing | Oreca 07 | 34 | (United States) Blake McDonald | 3–5 |
| (France) Duqueine Team | Oreca 07 | 30 | (Thailand) Carl Bennett | All |
| (France) Duqueine Team | Oreca 07 | 30 | (United States) John Falb | All |
| (France) Duqueine Team | Oreca 07 | 30 | (Denmark) Oliver Rasmussen | 1–3 |
| (France) Duqueine Team | Oreca 07 | 30 | (France) Jean-Baptiste Simmenauer | 4–5 |
| (Slovakia) ARC Bratislava | Oreca 07 | 44 | (Switzerland) Mathias Beche | All |
| (Slovakia) ARC Bratislava | Oreca 07 | 44 | (Slovakia) Miro Konôpka | All |
| (Slovakia) ARC Bratislava | Oreca 07 | 44 | (Germany) Jonas Ried | All |
| (Switzerland) Cool Racing | Oreca 07 | 47 | (Switzerland) Alexandre Coigny | 3–5 |
| (Switzerland) Cool Racing | Oreca 07 | 47 | (Spain) Lorenzo Fluxá | 3–5 |
| (Switzerland) Cool Racing | Oreca 07 | 47 | (France) Vladislav Lomko (Note: Mazepin, Mukovoz, Nesov and Titarenko are Russian, but they compete as neutral competitors as Russian national emblems were banned by the FIA following the Russian invasion of Ukraine. Bukhantsov, Gorbatskiy, Lomko and Minsky, also Russians, compete under a Kittitian, a Canadian, a French and a Cypriot licence respectively for the same reason.) | 3–5 |
| (Italy) AF Corse | Oreca 07 | 83 | (France) François Perrodo | All |
| (Italy) AF Corse | Oreca 07 | 83 | (Italy) Alessio Rovera | All |
| (Italy) AF Corse | Oreca 07 | 83 | (France) Matthieu Vaxivière | All |
| (United Kingdom) TF Sport | Oreca 07 | 90 | (United States) Michael Dinan | All |
| (United Kingdom) TF Sport | Oreca 07 | 90 | (Republic of Ireland) Charlie Eastwood | All |
| (United Kingdom) TF Sport | Oreca 07 | 90 | (Turkey) Salih Yoluç | All |
| (Jordan) 99 Racing | Oreca 07 | 99 | (Oman) Ahmad Al Harthy | All |
| (Jordan) 99 Racing | Oreca 07 | 99 | (Switzerland) Louis Delétraz | All |
| (Jordan) 99 Racing | Oreca 07 | 99 | Nikita Mazepin | 1–3 |
| (Jordan) 99 Racing | Oreca 07 | 99 | (Portugal) Filipe Albuquerque | 4–5 |

=== LMP3 ===
All cars in the LMP3 class use the Nissan VK56DE 5.6 L V8 engine and Michelin tyres.

| Entrant/Team | Car | No. | Drivers | Rounds |
|---|---|---|---|---|
| (Spain) CD Sport | Ligier JS P320 | 2 | (United Kingdom) Nick Adcock | All |
| (Spain) CD Sport | Ligier JS P320 | 2 | (Denmark) Michael Jensen | All |
| (Spain) CD Sport | Ligier JS P320 | 2 | (France) Fabien Lavergne | All |
| (Switzerland) Cool Racing | Ligier JS P320 | 17 | (Saint Kitts and Nevis) Alexander Bukhantsov | All |
| (Switzerland) Cool Racing | Ligier JS P320 | 17 | (United Kingdom) James Winslow | All |
| (Switzerland) Cool Racing | Ligier JS P320 | 17 | (Singapore) Danial Frost | 1–2 |
| (Switzerland) Cool Racing | Ligier JS P320 | 17 | (Portugal) Manuel Espírito Santo | 4–5 |
| (Denmark) High Class Racing | Ligier JS P320 | 20 | (Denmark) Anders Fjordbach | All |
| (Denmark) High Class Racing | Ligier JS P320 | 20 | (Iceland) Auðunn Guðmundsson | All |
| (Denmark) High Class Racing | Ligier JS P320 | 20 | (United States) Seth Lucas | All |
| (Czech Republic) Bretton Racing | Ligier JS P320 | 26 | (Algeria) Julien Gerbi | All |
| (Czech Republic) Bretton Racing | Ligier JS P320 | 26 | (Romania) Mihnea Ștefan | All |
| (Czech Republic) Bretton Racing | Ligier JS P320 | 26 | (Czech Republic) Dan Skočdopole | 1–2, 4–5 |
| (Czech Republic) Bretton Racing | Ligier JS P320 | 26 | (Australia) John Corbett | 3 |
| (Australia) GG Classic Cars | Ligier JS P320 | 58 | (Australia) George Nakas | 3–5 |
| (Australia) GG Classic Cars | Ligier JS P320 | 58 | (Australia) Fraser Ross | 3–5 |
| (Malaysia) Viper Niza Racing | Ligier JS P320 | 65 | (Malaysia) Dominic Ang | All |
| (Malaysia) Viper Niza Racing | Ligier JS P320 | 65 | (Malaysia) Douglas Khoo | All |
| (Malaysia) Viper Niza Racing | Ligier JS P320 | 65 | (Australia) Josh Burdon | 1–2 |

=== GT ===
| Entrant/Team | Car | Engine | No. | Drivers | Rounds |
|---|---|---|---|---|---|
| (Oman) AlManar Racing by GetSpeed | Mercedes-AMG GT3 Evo | Mercedes-AMG M159 6.2 L V8 | 7 | (Oman) Al Faisal Al Zubair | All |
| (Oman) AlManar Racing by GetSpeed | Mercedes-AMG GT3 Evo | Mercedes-AMG M159 6.2 L V8 | 7 | (Germany) Fabian Schiller | All |
| (Oman) AlManar Racing by GetSpeed | Mercedes-AMG GT3 Evo | Mercedes-AMG M159 6.2 L V8 | 7 | (Austria) Martin Konrad | 1–2 |
| (Oman) AlManar Racing by GetSpeed | Mercedes-AMG GT3 Evo | Mercedes-AMG M159 6.2 L V8 | 7 | (China) Anthony Liu Xu | 3–5 |
| (Germany) GetSpeed Performance | Mercedes-AMG GT3 Evo | Mercedes-AMG M159 6.2 L V8 | 9 | (United States) Anthony Bartone | All |
| (Germany) GetSpeed Performance | Mercedes-AMG GT3 Evo | Mercedes-AMG M159 6.2 L V8 | 9 | (United Kingdom) Aaron Walker | All |
| (Germany) GetSpeed Performance | Mercedes-AMG GT3 Evo | Mercedes-AMG M159 6.2 L V8 | 9 | (Luxembourg) Steve Jans | 1–2 |
| (Germany) GetSpeed Performance | Mercedes-AMG GT3 Evo | Mercedes-AMG M159 6.2 L V8 | 9 | (Austria) Martin Konrad | 3–5 |
| (New Zealand) Earl Bamber Motorsport | Porsche 911 GT3 R (992) | Porsche M97/80 4.2 L Flat-6 | 8 | (Denmark) Bastian Buus | All |
| (New Zealand) Earl Bamber Motorsport | Porsche 911 GT3 R (992) | Porsche M97/80 4.2 L Flat-6 | 8 | (Indonesia) Setiawan Santoso | All |
| (New Zealand) Earl Bamber Motorsport | Porsche 911 GT3 R (992) | Porsche M97/80 4.2 L Flat-6 | 8 | (Thailand) Tanart Sathienthirakul | All |
| (New Zealand) Earl Bamber Motorsport | Porsche 911 GT3 R (992) | Porsche M97/80 4.2 L Flat-6 | 84 | (New Zealand) Earl Bamber | All |
| (New Zealand) Earl Bamber Motorsport | Porsche 911 GT3 R (992) | Porsche M97/80 4.2 L Flat-6 | 84 | (Malaysia) Adrian D'Silva | All |
| (New Zealand) Earl Bamber Motorsport | Porsche 911 GT3 R (992) | Porsche M97/80 4.2 L Flat-6 | 84 | (China) Kerong Li | All |
| (Germany) Attempto Racing | Audi R8 LMS Evo II | Audi DAR 5.2 L V10 | 11 | (Canada) Ilya Gorbatskiy | All |
| (Germany) Attempto Racing | Audi R8 LMS Evo II | Audi DAR 5.2 L V10 | 11 | Alexey Nesov | All |
| (Germany) Attempto Racing | Audi R8 LMS Evo II | Audi DAR 5.2 L V10 | 11 | Sergey Titarenko | All |
| (Germany) Attempto Racing | Audi R8 LMS Evo II | Audi DAR 5.2 L V10 | 66 | (Germany) Alex Aka | All |
| (Germany) Attempto Racing | Audi R8 LMS Evo II | Audi DAR 5.2 L V10 | 66 | (Luxembourg) Dylan Pereira | All |
| (Germany) Attempto Racing | Audi R8 LMS Evo II | Audi DAR 5.2 L V10 | 66 | Andrey Mukovoz | All |
| (Germany) Huber Motorsport | Porsche 911 GT3 R (992) | Porsche M97/80 4.2 L Flat-6 | 18 | (France) Dorian Boccolacci | 4–5 |
| (Germany) Huber Motorsport | Porsche 911 GT3 R (992) | Porsche M97/80 4.2 L Flat-6 | 18 | (Germany) Jannes Fittje | 4–5 |
| (Germany) Huber Motorsport | Porsche 911 GT3 R (992) | Porsche M97/80 4.2 L Flat-6 | 18 | (Cyprus) Stanislav Minsky | 4–5 |
| (Germany) Leipert Motorsport | Lamborghini Huracán GT3 Evo 2 | Lamborghini DGF 5.2 L V10 | 19 | (New Zealand) Brendon Leitch | All |
| (Germany) Leipert Motorsport | Lamborghini Huracán GT3 Evo 2 | Lamborghini DGF 5.2 L V10 | 19 | (Italy) Marco Mapelli | All |
| (Germany) Leipert Motorsport | Lamborghini Huracán GT3 Evo 2 | Lamborghini DGF 5.2 L V10 | 19 | (Luxembourg) Gabriel Rindone | All |
| (Italy) AF Corse | Ferrari 296 GT3 | Ferrari F163CE 3.0 L Turbo V6 | 21 | (France) François Hériau | All |
| (Italy) AF Corse | Ferrari 296 GT3 | Ferrari F163CE 3.0 L Turbo V6 | 21 | (United Kingdom) Simon Mann | All |
| (Italy) AF Corse | Ferrari 296 GT3 | Ferrari F163CE 3.0 L Turbo V6 | 21 | (Italy) Davide Rigon | All |
| (Italy) AF Corse | Ferrari 296 GT3 | Ferrari F163CE 3.0 L Turbo V6 | 82 | (France) Emmanuel Collard | All |
| (Italy) AF Corse | Ferrari 296 GT3 | Ferrari F163CE 3.0 L Turbo V6 | 82 | (Japan) Kei Cozzolino | All |
| (Italy) AF Corse | Ferrari 296 GT3 | Ferrari F163CE 3.0 L Turbo V6 | 82 | (France) Charles-Henri Samani | All |
| (United Kingdom) Optimum Motorsport | McLaren 720S GT3 Evo | McLaren M840T 4.0 L Turbo V8 | 27 | (United Kingdom) Rob Bell | All |
| (United Kingdom) Optimum Motorsport | McLaren 720S GT3 Evo | McLaren M840T 4.0 L Turbo V8 | 27 | (United Kingdom) Ollie Millroy | All |
| (United Kingdom) Optimum Motorsport | McLaren 720S GT3 Evo | McLaren M840T 4.0 L Turbo V8 | 27 | (United Kingdom) Mark Radcliffe | All |
| (United Kingdom) Optimum Motorsport | McLaren 720S GT3 Evo | McLaren M840T 4.0 L Turbo V8 | 69 | (United Kingdom) James Cottingham | All |
| (United Kingdom) Optimum Motorsport | McLaren 720S GT3 Evo | McLaren M840T 4.0 L Turbo V8 | 69 | (United Kingdom) Sam De Haan | All |
| (United Kingdom) Optimum Motorsport | McLaren 720S GT3 Evo | McLaren M840T 4.0 L Turbo V8 | 69 | (United Kingdom) Tom Gamble | All |
| (Germany) Herberth Motorsport | Porsche 911 GT3 R (992) | Porsche M97/80 4.2 L Flat-6 | 33 | (Hong Kong) Antares Au | All |
| (Germany) Herberth Motorsport | Porsche 911 GT3 R (992) | Porsche M97/80 4.2 L Flat-6 | 33 | (Germany) Tim Heinemann | 1–3 |
| (Germany) Herberth Motorsport | Porsche 911 GT3 R (992) | Porsche M97/80 4.2 L Flat-6 | 33 | (Italy) Matteo Cairoli | 1–2 |
| (Germany) Herberth Motorsport | Porsche 911 GT3 R (992) | Porsche M97/80 4.2 L Flat-6 | 33 | (Germany) Laurin Heinrich | 3–5 |
| (Germany) Herberth Motorsport | Porsche 911 GT3 R (992) | Porsche M97/80 4.2 L Flat-6 | 33 | (Netherlands) Morris Schuring | 4–5 |
| (Lithuania) Pure Rxcing | Porsche 911 GT3 R (992) | Porsche M97/80 4.2 L Flat-6 | 91 | (Austria) Klaus Bachler | All |
| (Lithuania) Pure Rxcing | Porsche 911 GT3 R (992) | Porsche M97/80 4.2 L Flat-6 | 91 | (Saint Kitts and Nevis) Alex Malykhin (Note: Malykhin is Belarusian, but he competes under a Kittitian licence as Belarusian national emblems were banned by the FIA following the Russian invasion of Ukraine.) | All |
| (Lithuania) Pure Rxcing | Porsche 911 GT3 R (992) | Porsche M97/80 4.2 L Flat-6 | 91 | (Germany) Joel Sturm | All |
| (Hong Kong) Craft-Bamboo Racing | Mercedes-AMG GT3 Evo | Mercedes-AMG M159 6.2 L V8 | 37 | (Andorra) Jules Gounon | 1–2 |
| (Hong Kong) Craft-Bamboo Racing | Mercedes-AMG GT3 Evo | Mercedes-AMG M159 6.2 L V8 | 37 | (China) Anthony Liu Xu | 1–2 |
| (Hong Kong) Craft-Bamboo Racing | Mercedes-AMG GT3 Evo | Mercedes-AMG M159 6.2 L V8 | 37 | (Australia) Jayden Ojeda | 1–2 |
| (France) Saintéloc Racing | Audi R8 LMS Evo II | Audi DAR 5.2 L V10 | 42 | (Germany) Christopher Haase | All |
| (France) Saintéloc Racing | Audi R8 LMS Evo II | Audi DAR 5.2 L V10 | 42 | (Belgium) Gilles Magnus | All |
| (France) Saintéloc Racing | Audi R8 LMS Evo II | Audi DAR 5.2 L V10 | 42 | (France) Alban Varutti | All |
| (France) Saintéloc Racing | Audi R8 LMS Evo II | Audi DAR 5.2 L V10 | 43 | (Germany) Dennis Marschall | All |
| (France) Saintéloc Racing | Audi R8 LMS Evo II | Audi DAR 5.2 L V10 | 43 | (France) Paul Evrard | 1–2, 4–5 |
| (France) Saintéloc Racing | Audi R8 LMS Evo II | Audi DAR 5.2 L V10 | 43 | (Indonesia) Sean Gelael | 3 |
| (France) Saintéloc Racing | Audi R8 LMS Evo II | Audi DAR 5.2 L V10 | 43 | (China) Zhou Bihuang | 1–3 |
| (France) Saintéloc Racing | Audi R8 LMS Evo II | Audi DAR 5.2 L V10 | 43 | (Germany) Florian Scholze | 4–5 |
| (Germany) Team Project 1 | BMW M4 GT3 | BMW S58B30T0 3.0 L Turbo I6 | 56 | (Indonesia) Sean Gelael | 1–2 |
| (Germany) Team Project 1 | BMW M4 GT3 | BMW S58B30T0 3.0 L Turbo I6 | 56 | (China) Han Huilin | 1–2 |
| (Germany) Team Project 1 | BMW M4 GT3 | BMW S58B30T0 3.0 L Turbo I6 | 56 | (Netherlands) Maxime Oosten | 1–2 |
| (Germany) Team Project 1 | BMW M4 GT3 | BMW S58B30T0 3.0 L Turbo I6 | 93 | (United States) Christian Bogle | All |
| (Germany) Team Project 1 | BMW M4 GT3 | BMW S58B30T0 3.0 L Turbo I6 | 93 | (United Kingdom) Dan Harper | All |
| (Germany) Team Project 1 | BMW M4 GT3 | BMW S58B30T0 3.0 L Turbo I6 | 93 | (United Kingdom) Darren Leung | All |
| (Germany) Team Motopark | Mercedes-AMG GT3 Evo | Mercedes-AMG M159 6.2 L V8 | 75 | (Austria) Lukas Dunner | All |
| (Germany) Team Motopark | Mercedes-AMG GT3 Evo | Mercedes-AMG M159 6.2 L V8 | 75 | (Germany) Heiko Neumann | All |
| (Germany) Team Motopark | Mercedes-AMG GT3 Evo | Mercedes-AMG M159 6.2 L V8 | 75 | (Denmark) Morten Strømsted | All |
| (Japan) D'station Racing | Aston Martin Vantage AMR GT3 | Aston Martin M177 4.0 L Turbo V8 | 77 | (Japan) Tomonobu Fujii | All |
| (Japan) D'station Racing | Aston Martin Vantage AMR GT3 | Aston Martin M177 4.0 L Turbo V8 | 77 | (Japan) Satoshi Hoshino | All |
| (Japan) D'station Racing | Aston Martin Vantage AMR GT3 | Aston Martin M177 4.0 L Turbo V8 | 77 | (United Kingdom) Casper Stevenson | All |
| (United Kingdom) GR Racing | Ferrari 296 GT3 | Ferrari F163CE 3.0 L Turbo V6 | 86 | (United Kingdom) Ben Barker | All |
| (United Kingdom) GR Racing | Ferrari 296 GT3 | Ferrari F163CE 3.0 L Turbo V6 | 86 | (Italy) Riccardo Pera | All |
| (United Kingdom) GR Racing | Ferrari 296 GT3 | Ferrari F163CE 3.0 L Turbo V6 | 86 | (United Kingdom) Michael Wainwright | All |
| (Australia) Triple Eight JMR | Mercedes-AMG GT3 Evo | Mercedes-AMG M159 6.2 L V8 | 88 | (Malaysia) Prince Jefri Ibrahim | All |
| (Australia) Triple Eight JMR | Mercedes-AMG GT3 Evo | Mercedes-AMG M159 6.2 L V8 | 88 | (Germany) Luca Stolz | All |
| (Australia) Triple Eight JMR | Mercedes-AMG GT3 Evo | Mercedes-AMG M159 6.2 L V8 | 88 | (Australia) Broc Feeney | 1–2 |
| (Australia) Triple Eight JMR | Mercedes-AMG GT3 Evo | Mercedes-AMG M159 6.2 L V8 | 88 | (Australia) Jordan Love | 3–5 |
| (United Kingdom) TF Sport | Aston Martin Vantage AMR GT3 | Aston Martin M177 4.0 L Turbo V8 | 95 | (United Kingdom) Jonathan Adam | All |
| (United Kingdom) TF Sport | Aston Martin Vantage AMR GT3 | Aston Martin M177 4.0 L Turbo V8 | 95 | (United Kingdom) John Hartshorne | All |
| (United Kingdom) TF Sport | Aston Martin Vantage AMR GT3 | Aston Martin M177 4.0 L Turbo V8 | 95 | (United Kingdom) Ben Tuck | All |
| (United Arab Emirates) Dragon Racing | Ferrari 296 GT3 | Ferrari F163CE 3.0 L Turbo V6 | 98 | (Angola) Rui Andrade | 3–5 |
| (United Arab Emirates) Dragon Racing | Ferrari 296 GT3 | Ferrari F163CE 3.0 L Turbo V6 | 98 | (Italy) Nicola Marinangeli | 3–5 |
| (United Arab Emirates) Dragon Racing | Ferrari 296 GT3 | Ferrari F163CE 3.0 L Turbo V6 | 98 | (Italy) Marco Pulcini | 3–5 |

== Results ==
Bold indicates overall winner.

| Round | Circuit | LMP2 Winning Team | LMP3 Winning Team | GT Winning Team | Ref. |
| Round | Circuit | LMP2 Winning Drivers | LMP3 Winning Drivers | GT Winning Drivers | Ref. |
|---|---|---|---|---|---|
| 1 | (Malaysia) Sepang | **(Jordan) No. 99 99 Racing** | (Switzerland) No. 17 Cool Racing | (France) No. 42 Saintéloc Racing | Report |
| 1 | (Malaysia) Sepang | **(Oman) Ahmad Al Harthy** **(Switzerland) Louis Delétraz**; **Nikita Mazepin** | (Saint Kitts and Nevis) Alexander Bukhantsov (Singapore) Danial Frost (United Kingdom) James Winslow | (Germany) Christopher Haase (Belgium) Gilles Magnus (France) Alban Varutti | Report |
| 2 | (Malaysia) Sepang | **(Portugal) No. 4 CrowdStrike Racing by APR** | (Spain) No. 2 CD Sport | (Lithuania) No. 91 Pure Rxcing | Report |
| 2 | (Malaysia) Sepang | **(United States) Colin Braun** **(Denmark) Malthe Jakobsen** **(United States) George Kurtz** | (United Kingdom) Nick Adcock (Denmark) Michael Jensen (France) Fabien Lavergne | (Austria) Klaus Bachler (Saint Kitts and Nevis) Alex Malykhin (Germany) Joel Sturm | Report |
| 3 | (United Arab Emirates) Dubai | **(Jordan) No. 99 99 Racing** | (Switzerland) No. 17 Cool Racing | (Lithuania) No. 91 Pure Rxcing | Report |
| 3 | (United Arab Emirates) Dubai | **(Oman) Ahmad Al Harthy** **(Switzerland) Louis Delétraz**; **Nikita Mazepin** | (Saint Kitts and Nevis) Alexander Bukhantsov (United Kingdom) James Winslow | (Austria) Klaus Bachler (Saint Kitts and Nevis) Alex Malykhin (Germany) Joel Sturm | Report |
| 4 | (United Arab Emirates) Abu Dhabi | **(Portugal) No. 4 CrowdStrike Racing by APR** | (Spain) No. 2 CD Sport | (Australia) No. 88 Triple Eight JMR | Report |
| 4 | (United Arab Emirates) Abu Dhabi | **(United States) Colin Braun** **(Denmark) Malthe Jakobsen** **(United States) George Kurtz** | (United Kingdom) Nick Adcock (Denmark) Michael Jensen (France) Fabien Lavergne | (Malaysia) Prince Jefri Ibrahim (Australia) Jordan Love (Germany) Luca Stolz | Report |
| 5 | (United Arab Emirates) Abu Dhabi | **(Portugal) No. 25 Algarve Pro Racing** | (Czech Republic) No. 26 Bretton Racing | (Australia) No. 88 Triple Eight JMR | Report |
| 5 | (United Arab Emirates) Abu Dhabi | **(United States) Chris McMurry** **(United Kingdom) Toby Sowery** **(United Kingdom) Freddie Tomlinson** | (Algeria) Julien Gerbi (Czech Republic) Dan Skočdopole (Romania) Mihnea Ștefan | (Malaysia) Prince Jefri Ibrahim (Australia) Jordan Love (Germany) Luca Stolz | Report |

== Teams' Championships ==
Points are awarded according to the following structure:

| Position | **1st** | **2nd** | **3rd** | **4th** | **5th** | **6th** | **7th** | **8th** | **9th** | **10th** | **Pole** |
| Points | 25 | 18 | 15 | 12 | 10 | 8 | 6 | 4 | 2 | 1 | 1 |

=== LMP2 Teams Championship ===
| Pos. | Team | Car | SEP (Malaysia) | | DUB (United Arab Emirates) | ABU (United Arab Emirates) | | Points |
|---|---|---|---|---|---|---|---|---|
| 1 | (Portugal) #4 CrowdStrike Racing by APR | Oreca 07 | 6 | 1 | 3 | 1 | 5 | 83 |
| 2 | (Germany) #22 Proton Competition | Oreca 07 | 5 | 3 | 2 | 5 | 2 | 71 |
| 3 | (Jordan) #99 99 Racing | Oreca 07 | 1 | 2 | 1 | **Ret** | **11** | 70 |
| 4 | (Luxembourg) #3 DKR Engineering | Oreca 07 | 3 | 6 | 4 | 3 | 4 | 62 |
| 5 | (Italy) #83 AF Corse | Oreca 07 | 2 | 4 | 8 | 2 | 12 | 52 |
| 6 | (Portugal) #25 Algarve Pro Racing | Oreca 07 | 8 | 9 | 6 | 7 | 1 | 45 |
| 7 | (United Kingdom) #90 TF Sport | Oreca 07 | **7** | **8** | 5 | 4 | 6 | 42 |
| 8 | (Germany) #55 Proton Competition | Oreca 07 | 4 | 5 | **7** | 10 | Ret | 30 |
| 9 | (France) #30 Duqueine Team | Oreca 07 | 11 | 7 | Ret | 6 | 3 | 26 |
| 10 | (United Kingdom) #24 Nielsen Racing | Oreca 07 | 9 | Ret | 9 | 9 | 7 | 12 |
| 11 | (Slovakia) #44 ARC Bratislava | Oreca 07 | 10 | 10 | 10 | 11 | 8 | 7 |
| 12 | (United Kingdom) #34 Nielsen Racing | Oreca 07 | | | 11 | 8 | 9 | 6 |
| 13 | (Switzerland) #47 Cool Racing | Oreca 07 | | | Ret | 12 | 10 | 1 |

Key
| Colour | Result |
|---|---|
| Gold | Race winner |
| Silver | 2nd place |
| Bronze | 3rd place |
| Green | Points finish |
| Blue | Non-points finish |
| Blue | Non-classified finish (NC) |
| Purple | Did not finish (Ret) |
| Black | Disqualified (DSQ) |
| Black | Excluded (EX) |
| White | Did not start (DNS) |
| White | Race cancelled (C) |
| White | Withdrew (WD) |
| Blank | Did not participate |

**Bold** – Pole
Italic – Fastest Lap

=== LMP3 Teams Championship ===
| Pos. | Team | Car | SEP (Malaysia) | | DUB (United Arab Emirates) | ABU (United Arab Emirates) | | Points |
|---|---|---|---|---|---|---|---|---|
| 1 | (Switzerland) #17 Cool Racing | Ligier JS P320 | 1 | 3 | **1** | **2** | **2** | 104 |
| 2 | (Spain) #2 CD Sport | Ligier JS P320 | 2 | 1 | 2 | 1 | 3 | 101 |
| 3 | (Czech Republic) #26 Bretton Racing | Ligier JS P320 | 3 | 2 | 4 | 4 | 1 | 82 |
| 4 | (Denmark) #20 High Class Racing | Ligier JS P320 | **4** | **Ret** | 3 | 3 | 4 | 56 |
| 5 | (Australia) #58 GG Classic Cars | Ligier JS P320 | | | 5 | 5 | Ret | 20 |
| 6 | (Malaysia) #65 Viper Niza Racing | Ligier JS P320 | Ret | Ret | Ret | Ret | 5 | 10 |

Key
| Colour | Result |
|---|---|
| Gold | Race winner |
| Silver | 2nd place |
| Bronze | 3rd place |
| Green | Points finish |
| Blue | Non-points finish |
| Blue | Non-classified finish (NC) |
| Purple | Did not finish (Ret) |
| Black | Disqualified (DSQ) |
| Black | Excluded (EX) |
| White | Did not start (DNS) |
| White | Race cancelled (C) |
| White | Withdrew (WD) |
| Blank | Did not participate |

**Bold** – Pole
Italic – Fastest Lap

=== GT Teams Championship ===
| Pos. | Team | Car | SEP (Malaysia) | | DUB (United Arab Emirates) | ABU (United Arab Emirates) | | Points |
|---|---|---|---|---|---|---|---|---|
| 1 | (Lithuania) #91 Pure Rxcing | Porsche 911 GT3 R (992) | 6 | 1 | 1 | Ret | 2 | 76 |
| 2 | (Australia) #88 Triple Eight JMR | Mercedes-AMG GT3 Evo | 7 | 6 | 5 | 1 | 1 | 74 |
| 3 | (France) #42 Saintéloc Racing | Audi R8 LMS Evo II | **1** | 2 | Ret | 10 | 4 | 57 |
| 4 | (Oman) #7 AlManar Racing by GetSpeed | Mercedes-AMG GT3 Evo | 4 | 4 | **2** | **9** | 8 | 50 |
| 5 | (United Kingdom) #27 Optimum Motorsport | McLaren 720S GT3 Evo | 17 | 3 | 6 | 3 | 15 | 38 |
| 6 | (Germany) #19 Leipert Motorsport | Lamborghini Huracán GT3 Evo 2 | 5 | Ret | Ret | 2 | 7 | 34 |
| 7 | (Italy) #21 AF Corse | Ferrari 296 GT3 | 10 | Ret | 3 | 7 | 5 | 32 |
| 8 | (France) #43 Saintéloc Racing | Audi R8 LMS Evo II | 3 | 13 | 4 | WD | WD | 27 |
| 9 | (United Kingdom) #95 TF Sport | Aston Martin Vantage AMR GT3 | 15 | 9 | 10 | 6 | 3 | 26 |
| 10 | (United Kingdom) #69 Optimum Motorsport | McLaren 720S GT3 Evo | 13 | 5 | Ret | 4 | 12 | 22 |
| 11 | (Germany) #66 Attempto Racing | Audi R8 LMS Evo II | 2 | Ret | Ret | 11 | 9 | 20 |
| 12 | (Germany) #33 Herberth Motorsport | Porsche 911 GT3 R (992) | Ret | 7 | 9 | 5 | 10 | 19 |
| 13 | (Germany) #93 Team Project 1 | BMW M4 GT3 | 18 | 10 | 7 | 8 | 11 | 11 |
| 14 | (Italy) #82 AF Corse | Ferrari 296 GT3 | 21 | 12 | 11 | 16 | 6 | 8 |
| 15 | (United Kingdom) #86 GR Racing | Ferrari 296 GT3 | 9 | 11 | 8 | 20 | WD | 6 |
| 16 | (Germany) #9 GetSpeed Performance | Mercedes-AMG GT3 Evo | 8 | Ret | Ret | 15 | **Ret** | 5 |
| 17 | (Hong Kong) #37 Craft-Bamboo Racing | Mercedes-AMG GT3 Evo | Ret | **8** | | | | 5 |
| 18 | (New Zealand) #8 Earl Bamber Motorsport | Porsche 911 GT3 R (992) | 11 | Ret | 12 | 13 | Ret | 0 |
| 19 | (United Arab Emirates) #98 Dragon Racing | Ferrari 296 GT3 | | | 14 | 12 | 13 | 0 |
| 20 | (New Zealand) #84 Earl Bamber Motorsport | Porsche 911 GT3 R (992) | 12 | 14 | 15 | 17 | 17 | 0 |
| 21 | (Germany) #75 Team Motopark | Mercedes-AMG GT3 Evo | 19 | 16 | 13 | 14 | Ret | 0 |
| 22 | (Germany) #11 Attempto Racing | Audi R8 LMS Evo II | 14 | 15 | Ret | Ret | 16 | 0 |
| 23 | (Japan) #77 D'station Racing | Aston Martin Vantage AMR GT3 | 16 | 17 | Ret | 19 | 14 | 0 |
| 24 | (Germany) #18 Huber Motorsport | Porsche 911 GT3 R (992) | | | | 18 | 18 | 0 |
| 25 | (Germany) #56 Team Project 1 | BMW M4 GT3 | 20 | 18 | | | | 0 |

Key
| Colour | Result |
|---|---|
| Gold | Race winner |
| Silver | 2nd place |
| Bronze | 3rd place |
| Green | Points finish |
| Blue | Non-points finish |
| Blue | Non-classified finish (NC) |
| Purple | Did not finish (Ret) |
| Black | Disqualified (DSQ) |
| Black | Excluded (EX) |
| White | Did not start (DNS) |
| White | Race cancelled (C) |
| White | Withdrew (WD) |
| Blank | Did not participate |

**Bold** – Pole
Italic – Fastest Lap

== Drivers' championships ==
Points are awarded according to the following structure:

| Position | **1st** | **2nd** | **3rd** | **4th** | **5th** | **6th** | **7th** | **8th** | **9th** | **10th** | **Pole** |
| Points | 25 | 18 | 15 | 12 | 10 | 8 | 6 | 4 | 2 | 1 | 1 |

=== LMP2 Drivers Championship ===
| Pos. | Drivers | Team | SEP (Malaysia) | | DUB (United Arab Emirates) | ABU (United Arab Emirates) | | Points |
|---|---|---|---|---|---|---|---|---|
| 1 | (United States) Colin Braun | (Portugal) CrowdStrike Racing by APR | 6 | 1 | 3 | 1 | 5 | 83 |
| 1 | (Denmark) Malthe Jakobsen | (Portugal) CrowdStrike Racing by APR | 6 | 1 | 3 | 1 | 5 | 83 |
| 1 | (United States) George Kurtz | (Portugal) CrowdStrike Racing by APR | 6 | 1 | 3 | 1 | 5 | 83 |
| 2 | (France) Julien Andlauer | (Germany) Proton Competition | 5 | 3 | 2 | 5 | 2 | 71 |
| 2 | (Austria) René Binder | (Germany) Proton Competition | 5 | 3 | 2 | 5 | 2 | 71 |
| 2 | (Italy) Giorgio Roda | (Germany) Proton Competition | 5 | 3 | 2 | 5 | 2 | 71 |
| 3 | (Oman) Ahmad Al Harthy | (Jordan) 99 Racing | 1 | 2 | 1 | **Ret** | **11** | 70 |
| 3 | (Switzerland) Louis Delétraz | (Jordan) 99 Racing | 1 | 2 | 1 | **Ret** | **11** | 70 |
| 4 | Nikita Mazepin | (Jordan) 99 Racing | 1 | 2 | 1 | | | 68 |
| 5 | (France) Tom Dillmann | (Luxembourg) DKR Engineering | 3 | 6 | 4 | 3 | 4 | 62 |
| 5 | (Germany) Laurents Hörr | (Luxembourg) DKR Engineering | 3 | 6 | 4 | 3 | 4 | 62 |
| 5 | (Germany) Alexander Mattschull | (Luxembourg) DKR Engineering | 3 | 6 | 4 | 3 | 4 | 62 |
| 6 | (France) François Perrodo | (Italy) AF Corse | 2 | 4 | 8 | 2 | 12 | 52 |
| 6 | (Italy) Alessio Rovera | (Italy) AF Corse | 2 | 4 | 8 | 2 | 12 | 52 |
| 6 | (France) Matthieu Vaxivière | (Italy) AF Corse | 2 | 4 | 8 | 2 | 12 | 52 |
| 7 | (United States) Chris McMurry | (Portugal) Algarve Pro Racing | 8 | 9 | 6 | 7 | 1 | 45 |
| 7 | (United Kingdom) Toby Sowery | (Portugal) Algarve Pro Racing | 8 | 9 | 6 | 7 | 1 | 45 |
| 7 | (United Kingdom) Freddie Tomlinson | (Portugal) Algarve Pro Racing | 8 | 9 | 6 | 7 | 1 | 45 |
| 8 | (United States) Michael Dinan | (United Kingdom) TF Sport | **7** | **8** | 5 | 4 | 6 | 42 |
| 8 | (Republic of Ireland) Charlie Eastwood | (United Kingdom) TF Sport | **7** | **8** | 5 | 4 | 6 | 42 |
| 8 | (Turkey) Salih Yoluç | (United Kingdom) TF Sport | **7** | **8** | 5 | 4 | 6 | 42 |
| 9 | (France) Paul-Loup Chatin | (Germany) Proton Competition | 4 | 5 | **7** | 10 | Ret | 30 |
| 9 | (United States) P. J. Hyett | (Germany) Proton Competition | 4 | 5 | **7** | 10 | Ret | 30 |
| 9 | (United Kingdom) Harry Tincknell | (Germany) Proton Competition | 4 | 5 | **7** | 10 | Ret | 30 |
| 10 | (Thailand) Carl Bennett | (France) Duqueine Team | 11 | 7 | Ret | 6 | 3 | 29 |
| 10 | (United States) John Falb | (France) Duqueine Team | 11 | 7 | Ret | 6 | 3 | 29 |
| 11 | (France) Jean-Baptiste Simmenauer | (France) Duqueine Team | | | | 6 | 3 | 23 |
| 12 | (United Kingdom) Ian Loggie | (United Kingdom) Nielsen Racing | 9 | Ret | 9 | 9 | 7 | 12 |
| 12 | (Mexico) Alex García | (United Kingdom) Nielsen Racing | 9 | Ret | 9 | 9 | 7 | 12 |
| 13 | (Austria) Ferdinand Habsburg | (United Kingdom) Nielsen Racing | 9 | Ret | | 9 | 7 | 10 |
| 14 | (Switzerland) Mathias Beche | (Slovakia) ARC Bratislava | 10 | 10 | 10 | 11 | 8 | 7 |
| 14 | (Slovakia) Miro Konôpka | (Slovakia) ARC Bratislava | 10 | 10 | 10 | 11 | 8 | 7 |
| 14 | (Germany) Jonas Ried | (Slovakia) ARC Bratislava | 10 | 10 | 10 | 11 | 8 | 7 |
| 15 | (Denmark) Oliver Rasmussen | (France) Duqueine Team | 11 | 7 | Ret | | | 6 |
| 16 | (United Kingdom) Matt Bell | (United Kingdom) Nielsen Racing | | | 11 | 8 | 9 | 6 |
| 16 | (United States) Patrick Liddy | (United Kingdom) Nielsen Racing | | | 11 | 8 | 9 | 6 |
| 16 | (United States) Blake McDonald | (United Kingdom) Nielsen Racing | | | 11 | 8 | 9 | 6 |
| 17 | (United Kingdom) Will Stevens | (United Kingdom) Nielsen Racing | | | 9 | | | 2 |
| 18 | (Portugal) Filipe Albuquerque | (Jordan) 99 Racing | | | | **Ret** | **11** | 2 |
| 19 | (Switzerland) Alexandre Coigny | (Switzerland) Cool Racing | | | Ret | 12 | 10 | 1 |
| 19 | (Spain) Lorenzo Fluxá | (Switzerland) Cool Racing | | | Ret | 12 | 10 | 1 |
| 19 | (France) Vladislav Lomko | (Switzerland) Cool Racing | | | Ret | 12 | 10 | 1 |

Key
| Colour | Result |
|---|---|
| Gold | Race winner |
| Silver | 2nd place |
| Bronze | 3rd place |
| Green | Points finish |
| Blue | Non-points finish |
| Blue | Non-classified finish (NC) |
| Purple | Did not finish (Ret) |
| Black | Disqualified (DSQ) |
| Black | Excluded (EX) |
| White | Did not start (DNS) |
| White | Race cancelled (C) |
| White | Withdrew (WD) |
| Blank | Did not participate |

**Bold** – Pole
Italic – Fastest Lap

=== LMP3 Drivers Championship ===
| Pos. | Team | Car | SEP (Malaysia) | | DUB (United Arab Emirates) | ABU (United Arab Emirates) | | Points |
|---|---|---|---|---|---|---|---|---|
| 1 | (Saint Kitts and Nevis) Alexander Bukhantsov | (Switzerland) Cool Racing | 1 | 3 | **1** | **2** | **2** | 104 |
| 1 | (United Kingdom) James Winslow | (Switzerland) Cool Racing | 1 | 3 | **1** | **2** | **2** | 104 |
| 2 | (United Kingdom) Nick Adcock | (Spain) CD Sport | 2 | 1 | 2 | 1 | 3 | 101 |
| 2 | (Denmark) Michael Jensen | (Spain) CD Sport | 2 | 1 | 2 | 1 | 3 | 101 |
| 2 | (France) Fabien Lavergne | (Spain) CD Sport | 2 | 1 | 2 | 1 | 3 | 101 |
| 3 | (Algeria) Julien Gerbi | (Czech Republic) Bretton Racing | 3 | 2 | 4 | 4 | 1 | 82 |
| 3 | (Romania) Mihnea Ștefan | (Czech Republic) Bretton Racing | 3 | 2 | 4 | 4 | 1 | 82 |
| 4 | (Czech Republic) Dan Skočdopole | (Czech Republic) Bretton Racing | 3 | 2 | | 4 | 1 | 70 |
| 5 | (Denmark) Anders Fjordbach | (Denmark) High Class Racing | **4** | **Ret** | 3 | 3 | 4 | 56 |
| 5 | (Iceland) Auðunn Guðmundsson | (Denmark) High Class Racing | **4** | **Ret** | 3 | 3 | 4 | 56 |
| 5 | (United States) Seth Lucas | (Denmark) High Class Racing | **4** | **Ret** | 3 | 3 | 4 | 56 |
| 6 | (Singapore) Danial Frost | (Switzerland) Cool Racing | 1 | 3 | | | | 40 |
| 7 | (Portugal) Manuel Espírito Santo | (Switzerland) Cool Racing | | | | **2** | **2** | 38 |
| 8 | (Australia) George Nakas | (Australia) GG Classic Cars | | | 5 | 5 | Ret | 20 |
| 8 | (Australia) Fraser Ross | (Australia) GG Classic Cars | | | 5 | 5 | Ret | 20 |
| 9 | (Australia) John Corbett | (Czech Republic) Bretton Racing | | | 4 | | | 12 |
| 10 | (Malaysia) Dominic Ang | (Malaysia) Viper Niza Racing | Ret | Ret | Ret | Ret | 5 | 10 |
| 10 | (Malaysia) Douglas Khoo | (Malaysia) Viper Niza Racing | Ret | Ret | Ret | Ret | 5 | 10 |
| - | (Australia) Josh Burdon | (Malaysia) Viper Niza Racing | Ret | Ret | | | | 0 |

Key
| Colour | Result |
|---|---|
| Gold | Race winner |
| Silver | 2nd place |
| Bronze | 3rd place |
| Green | Points finish |
| Blue | Non-points finish |
| Blue | Non-classified finish (NC) |
| Purple | Did not finish (Ret) |
| Black | Disqualified (DSQ) |
| Black | Excluded (EX) |
| White | Did not start (DNS) |
| White | Race cancelled (C) |
| White | Withdrew (WD) |
| Blank | Did not participate |

**Bold** – Pole
Italic – Fastest Lap

=== GT Drivers Championship ===
| Pos. | Team | Car | SEP (Malaysia) | | DUB (United Arab Emirates) | ABU (United Arab Emirates) | | Points |
|---|---|---|---|---|---|---|---|---|
| 1 | (Saint Kitts and Nevis) Alex Malykhin | (Lithuania) Pure Rxcing | 6 | 1 | 1 | Ret | 2 | 76 |
| 1 | (Germany) Joel Sturm | (Lithuania) Pure Rxcing | 6 | 1 | 1 | Ret | 2 | 76 |
| 1 | (Austria) Klaus Bachler | (Lithuania) Pure Rxcing | 6 | 1 | 1 | Ret | 2 | 76 |
| 2 | (Malaysia) Prince Jefri Ibrahim | (Australia) Triple Eight JMR | 7 | 6 | 5 | 1 | 1 | 74 |
| 2 | (Germany) Luca Stolz | (Australia) Triple Eight JMR | 7 | 6 | 5 | 1 | 1 | 74 |
| 3 | (Australia) Jordan Love | (Australia) Triple Eight JMR | | | 5 | 1 | 1 | 60 |
| 4 | (France) Alban Varutti | (France) Saintéloc Racing | **1** | 2 | Ret | 10 | 4 | 57 |
| 4 | (Belgium) Gilles Magnus | (France) Saintéloc Racing | **1** | 2 | Ret | 10 | 4 | 57 |
| 4 | (Germany) Christopher Haase | (France) Saintéloc Racing | **1** | 2 | Ret | 10 | 4 | 57 |
| 5 | (Oman) Al Faisal Al Zubair | (Oman) AlManar Racing by GetSpeed | 4 | 4 | **2** | **9** | 8 | 50 |
| 5 | (Germany) Fabian Schiller | (Oman) AlManar Racing by GetSpeed | 4 | 4 | **2** | **9** | 8 | 50 |
| 6 | (United Kingdom) Mark Radcliffe | (United Kingdom) Optimum Motorsport | 17 | 3 | 6 | 3 | 14 | 38 |
| 6 | (United Kingdom) Ollie Millroy | (United Kingdom) Optimum Motorsport | 17 | 3 | 6 | 3 | 14 | 38 |
| 6 | (United Kingdom) Rob Bell | (United Kingdom) Optimum Motorsport | 17 | 3 | 6 | 3 | 14 | 38 |
| 7 | (Italy) Gabriel Rindone | (Germany) Leipert Motorsport | 5 | Ret | Ret | 2 | 7 | 34 |
| 7 | (New Zealand) Brendon Leitch | (Germany) Leipert Motorsport | 5 | Ret | Ret | 2 | 7 | 34 |
| 7 | (Italy) Marco Mapelli | (Germany) Leipert Motorsport | 5 | Ret | Ret | 2 | 7 | 34 |
| 8 | (France) François Hériau | (Italy) AF Corse | 10 | Ret | 3 | 7 | 5 | 32 |
| 8 | (United Kingdom) Simon Mann | (Italy) AF Corse | 10 | Ret | 3 | 7 | 5 | 32 |
| 8 | (Italy) Davide Rigon | (Italy) AF Corse | 10 | Ret | 3 | 7 | 5 | 32 |
| 9 | (China) Anthony Liu Xu | (Hong Kong) Craft-Bamboo Racing | Ret | **8** | | | | 31 |
| 9 | (China) Anthony Liu Xu | (Oman) AlManar Racing by GetSpeed | | | **2** | **9** | 8 | 31 |
| 10 | (China) Bihuang Zhou | (France) Saintéloc Racing | 3 | 13 | 4 | | | 27 |
| 10 | (Germany) Dennis Marschall | (France) Saintéloc Racing | 3 | 13 | 4 | WD | WD | 27 |
| 11 | (United Kingdom) John Hartshorne | (United Kingdom) TF Sport | 15 | 9 | 10 | 6 | 3 | 26 |
| 11 | (United Kingdom) Ben Tuck | (United Kingdom) TF Sport | 15 | 9 | 10 | 6 | 3 | 26 |
| 11 | (United Kingdom) Jonathan Adam | (United Kingdom) TF Sport | 15 | 9 | 10 | 6 | 3 | 26 |
| 12 | (Austria) Martin Konrad | (Oman) AlManar Racing by GetSpeed | 4 | 4 | | | | 25 |
| 12 | (Austria) Martin Konrad | (Germany) GetSpeed Performance | | | Ret | 15 | **Ret** | 25 |
| 13 | (United Kingdom) James Cottingham | (United Kingdom) Optimum Motorsport | 13 | 5 | Ret | 4 | 11 | 22 |
| 13 | (United Kingdom) Sam De Haan | (United Kingdom) Optimum Motorsport | 13 | 5 | Ret | 4 | 11 | 22 |
| 13 | (United Kingdom) Tom Gamble | (United Kingdom) Optimum Motorsport | 13 | 5 | Ret | 4 | 11 | 22 |
| 14 | Andrey Mukovoz | (Germany) Attempto Racing | 2 | Ret | Ret | 11 | 9 | 20 |
| 14 | (Germany) Alex Aka | (Germany) Attempto Racing | 2 | Ret | Ret | 11 | 9 | 20 |
| 14 | (Luxembourg) Dylan Pereira | (Germany) Attempto Racing | 2 | Ret | Ret | 11 | 9 | 20 |
| 15 | (Hong Kong) Antares Au | (Germany) Herberth Motorsport | Ret | 7 | 9 | 5 | 10 | 19 |
| 16 | (France) Paul Evrard | (France) Saintéloc Racing | 3 | 13 | | WD | WD | 15 |
| 17 | (Australia) Broc Feeney | (Australia) Triple Eight JMR | 7 | 6 | | | | 14 |
| 18 | (Germany) Laurin Heinrich | (Germany) Herberth Motorsport | | | 9 | 5 | 10 | 13 |
| 19 | (Indonesia) Sean Gelael | (Germany) Team Project 1 | 20 | 18 | | | | 12 |
| 19 | (Indonesia) Sean Gelael | (France) Saintéloc Racing | | | 4 | | | 12 |
| 20 | (Netherlands) Morris Schuring | (Germany) Herberth Motorsport | | | | 5 | 10 | 11 |
| 21 | (United Kingdom) Darren Leung | (Germany) Team Project 1 | 18 | 10 | 7 | 8 | 15 | 11 |
| 21 | (United States) Christian Bogle | (Germany) Team Project 1 | 18 | 10 | 7 | 8 | 15 | 11 |
| 21 | (United Kingdom) Dan Harper | (Germany) Team Project 1 | 18 | 10 | 7 | 8 | 15 | 11 |
| 22 | (France) Charles-Henri Samani | (Italy) AF Corse | 21 | 12 | 11 | 16 | 6 | 8 |
| 22 | (France) Emmanuel Collard | (Italy) AF Corse | 21 | 12 | 11 | 16 | 6 | 8 |
| 22 | (Japan) Kei Cozzolino | (Italy) AF Corse | 21 | 12 | 11 | 16 | 6 | 8 |
| 23 | (Germany) Tim Heinemann | (Germany) Herberth Motorsport | Ret | 7 | 9 | | | 8 |
| 24 | (Italy) Matteo Cairoli | (Germany) Herberth Motorsport | Ret | 7 | | | | 6 |
| 25 | (United Kingdom) Michael Wainwright | (United Kingdom) GR Racing | 9 | 11 | 8 | Ret | WD | 6 |
| 25 | (Italy) Riccardo Pera | (United Kingdom) GR Racing | 9 | 11 | 8 | Ret | WD | 6 |
| 25 | (United Kingdom) Ben Barker | (United Kingdom) GR Racing | 9 | 11 | 8 | Ret | WD | 6 |
| 26 | (United States) Anthony Bartone | (Germany) GetSpeed Performance | 8 | Ret | Ret | 15 | **Ret** | 5 |
| 26 | (United Kingdom) Aaron Walker | (Germany) GetSpeed Performance | 8 | Ret | Ret | 15 | **Ret** | 5 |
| 27 | (Andorra) Jules Gounon | (Hong Kong) Craft-Bamboo Racing | Ret | **8** | | | | 5 |
| 27 | (Australia) Jayden Ojeda | (Hong Kong) Craft-Bamboo Racing | Ret | **8** | | | | 5 |
| 28 | (Luxembourg) Steve Jans | (Germany) GetSpeed Performance | 8 | Ret | | | | 4 |
| 29 | (Indonesia) Setiawan Santoso | (New Zealand) Earl Bamber Motorsport | 11 | Ret | 12 | 13 | Ret | 0 |
| 29 | (Thailand) Tanart Sathienthirakul | (New Zealand) Earl Bamber Motorsport | 11 | Ret | 12 | 13 | Ret | 0 |
| 29 | (Denmark) Bastian Buus | (New Zealand) Earl Bamber Motorsport | 11 | Ret | 12 | 13 | Ret | 0 |
| 30 | (Italy) Marco Pulcini | (United Arab Emirates) Dragon Racing | | | 14 | 12 | 12 | 0 |
| 30 | (Italy) Nicola Marinangeli | (United Arab Emirates) Dragon Racing | | | 14 | 12 | 12 | 0 |
| 30 | (Angola) Rui Andrade | (United Arab Emirates) Dragon Racing | | | 14 | 12 | 12 | 0 |
| 31 | (Malaysia) Adrian D'Silva | (New Zealand) Earl Bamber Motorsport | 12 | 14 | 15 | 17 | 17 | 0 |
| 31 | (China) Kerong Li | (New Zealand) Earl Bamber Motorsport | 12 | 14 | 15 | 17 | 17 | 0 |
| 31 | (New Zealand) Earl Bamber | (New Zealand) Earl Bamber Motorsport | 12 | 14 | 15 | 17 | 17 | 0 |
| 32 | (Germany) Heiko Neumann | (Germany) Team Motopark | 19 | 16 | 13 | 14 | 19 | 0 |
| 32 | (Denmark) Morten Strømsted | (Germany) Team Motopark | 19 | 16 | 13 | 14 | 19 | 0 |
| 32 | (Austria) Lukas Dunner | (Germany) Team Motopark | 19 | 16 | 13 | 14 | 19 | 0 |
| 33 | (Japan) Satoshi Hoshino | (Japan) D'station Racing | 16 | 17 | Ret | 19 | 13 | 0 |
| 33 | (United Kingdom) Casper Stevenson | (Japan) D'station Racing | 16 | 17 | Ret | 19 | 13 | 0 |
| 33 | (Japan) Tomonobu Fujii | (Japan) D'station Racing | 16 | 17 | Ret | 19 | 13 | 0 |
| 34 | (Canada) Ilya Gorbatskiy | (Germany) Attempto Racing | 14 | 15 | Ret | Ret | 16 | 0 |
| 34 | Alexey Nesov | (Germany) Attempto Racing | 14 | 15 | Ret | Ret | 16 | 0 |
| 34 | Sergey Titarenko | (Germany) Attempto Racing | 14 | 15 | Ret | Ret | 16 | 0 |
| 35 | (Cyprus) Stanislav Minsky | (Germany) Huber Motorsport | | | | 18 | 18 | 0 |
| 35 | (Germany) Jannes Fittje | (Germany) Huber Motorsport | | | | 18 | 18 | 0 |
| 35 | (France) Dorian Boccolacci | (Germany) Huber Motorsport | | | | 18 | 18 | 0 |
| 36 | (China) Huilin Han | (Germany) Team Project 1 | 20 | 18 | | | | 0 |
| 36 | (Netherlands) Maxime Oosten | (Germany) Team Project 1 | 20 | 18 | | | | 0 |
| - | (Germany) Florian Scholze | (France) Saintéloc Racing | | | | WD | WD | - |

Key
| Colour | Result |
|---|---|
| Gold | Race winner |
| Silver | 2nd place |
| Bronze | 3rd place |
| Green | Points finish |
| Blue | Non-points finish |
| Blue | Non-classified finish (NC) |
| Purple | Did not finish (Ret) |
| Black | Disqualified (DSQ) |
| Black | Excluded (EX) |
| White | Did not start (DNS) |
| White | Race cancelled (C) |
| White | Withdrew (WD) |
| Blank | Did not participate |

**Bold** – Pole
Italic – Fastest Lap
