= Nikita Mazepin =

Russian racing driver (born 1999)

- Ники́та Мазе́пин
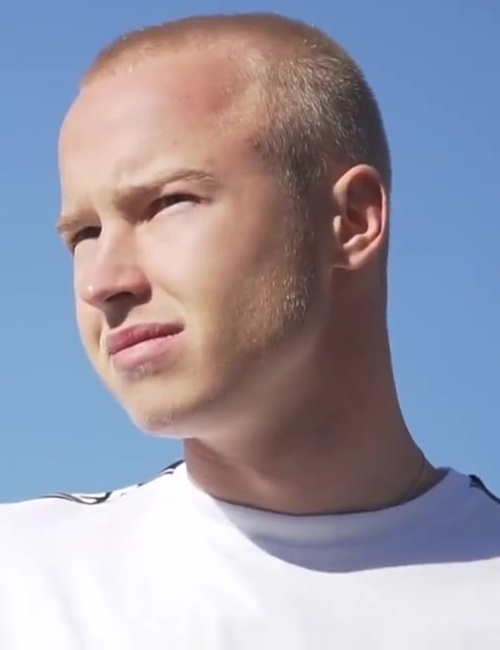
- Mazepin in 2019
- Born: Nikita Dmitriyevich Mazepin; 2 March 1999 (age 27); Moscow, Russia
- Parent: Dmitry Mazepin (father)

Asian Le Mans Series career
- Debut season: 2023
- Current team: 99 Racing
- Categorisation: FIA Platinum
- Car number: 99
- Starts: 7
- Championships: 0
- Wins: 2
- Podiums: 5
- Poles: 2
- Fastest laps: 1
- Best finish: 4th in 2023, 2023–24 (LMP2)

Formula One World Championship career
- Nationality: Russian Automobile Federation (Note: Mazepin is Russian, but in 2021 and 2022 he was entered as a neutral athlete using the designation "RAF" (Russian Automobile Federation), as the Court of Arbitration for Sport upheld a ban on Russia competing at World Championships. The ban was implemented by the World Anti-Doping Agency in response to a state-sponsored doping program of Russian athletes.)
- Active years: 2021
- Team: Haas
- Car number: 9
- Entries: 22 (21 starts)
- Championships: 0
- Wins: 0
- Podiums: 0
- Career points: 0
- Pole positions: 0
- Fastest laps: 0
- First entry: 2021 Bahrain Grand Prix
- Last entry: 2021 Abu Dhabi Grand Prix

Previous series
- 2019–2020; 2018; 2016–2017; 2015–2016; 2015; 2015; 2014–2015: FIA Formula 2; GP3 Series; FIA F3 European; Formula Renault Eurocup; Formula Renault NEC; Toyota Racing Series; MRF Challenge

Nikita Dmitriyevich Mazepin (Russian: Ники́та Дми́триевич Мазе́пин, IPA: [nʲɪˈkʲitə ˈdmʲɪtrʲɪjɪvʲɪtɕ mɐˈzʲepʲɪn]; born 2 March 1999) is a Russian racing driver and motorsport executive who most recently competed under a neutral flag in the 2025 Middle East Trophy for Graff Racing. Mazepin competed in Formula One in 2021.

Born and raised in Moscow, Mazepin is the son of Dmitry Mazepin, a Belarusian-Russian oligarch who owns Uralchem. After finishing runner-up to Lando Norris at the senior Karting World Championship in 2014, Mazepin graduated to junior formulae. Following a season in Formula Renault 2.0, he progressed to the FIA Formula 3 European Championship in 2016, finishing tenth the following season. Mazepin then competed in the GP3 Series in 2018, finishing runner-up to Anthoine Hubert in his rookie season with ART. He also finished third in the 2019–20 F3 Asian Championship. Graduating to FIA Formula 2 in 2019, Mazepin finished fifth in 2020 with Hitech.

A test driver for Force India from 2016 to 2018, Mazepin topped the Barcelona in-season test in 2019 with Mercedes, driving the W10. Mazepin signed for Haas in 2021 to partner Mick Schumacher, making his Formula One debut at the Bahrain Grand Prix under a neutral flag representing the Russian Automobile Federation. After crashing out on the first lap of his debut, Haas scored zero points with the VF-21, with Mazepin finishing a career-best fourteenth in Azerbaijan. He made his final Formula One start in Saudi Arabia, withdrawing from the Abu Dhabi Grand Prix with COVID-19. His multi-year contract with Haas—alongside Russian sponsor Uralkali's—was terminated for the 2022 season following the Russian invasion of Ukraine, resulting in two years of arbitration and legal proceedings.

Upon his departure from Formula One, Mazepin founded the Jordanian-British sportscar racing team 99 Racing. With the team, he competed in the Asian Le Mans Series from 2023 to 2024, winning multiple races. In rally raid, Mazepin took a class victory at the Silk Way Rally in 2022.

== Early life ==
Nikita Dmitriyevich Mazepin was born on 2 March 1999 in Moscow, Russia, and is the son of Dmitry Mazepin, a Belarusian-Russian oligarch businessman who is the former core shareholder and former chairman of Uralchem.

== Education ==
Starting in 2017, he studied international relations at the Faculty of Global Studies at the Moscow State University, graduating with a bachelor's degree in 2021. Immediately after receiving his bachelor's degree, he enrolled in the master's program at the same faculty of the same university and studied the same academic major, graduating with a master's degree in 2023.

Being a student, he also studied at the military training center of the Moscow State University, completing the reserve officer training program within the Department of Special Training and becoming a lieutenant of the reserve of the Russian Armed Forces.

== Junior racing career ==
=== Karting (2010–2014) ===
Having won the Russian Karting championship, Mazepin started his international karting career in 2011 in the Andrea Margutti Trophy. He quickly moved up the ranks, driving in the CIK-FIA Karting European Championship in the KF3 class in just his second year of competition. In 2013, he finished fourth in the KFJ-category of the WSK Super Master Series, and in 2014, his final year of karting, he came 2nd in the Karting World Championship to Lando Norris.

=== Lower formulae (2014–2015) ===
Mazepin made his car racing debut in the MRF Challenge Formula 2000 at the end of 2014, driving in the first round of the series and grabbing his first podium in just his second race of his single-seater career. He then made the switch to compete in the Toyota Racing Series with ETEC Motorsport, where he finished 18th in the drivers' standings. He followed that up by racing for Josef Kaufmann Racing in the Formula Renault Northern European Cup alongside Louis Delétraz, Kevin Jörg and fellow rookie Dries Vanthoor. Mazepin scored one podium with a third-place finish at the Red Bull Ring, and ended up twelfth in the championship.

=== Formula Three (2016–2017) ===
==== 2016 ====
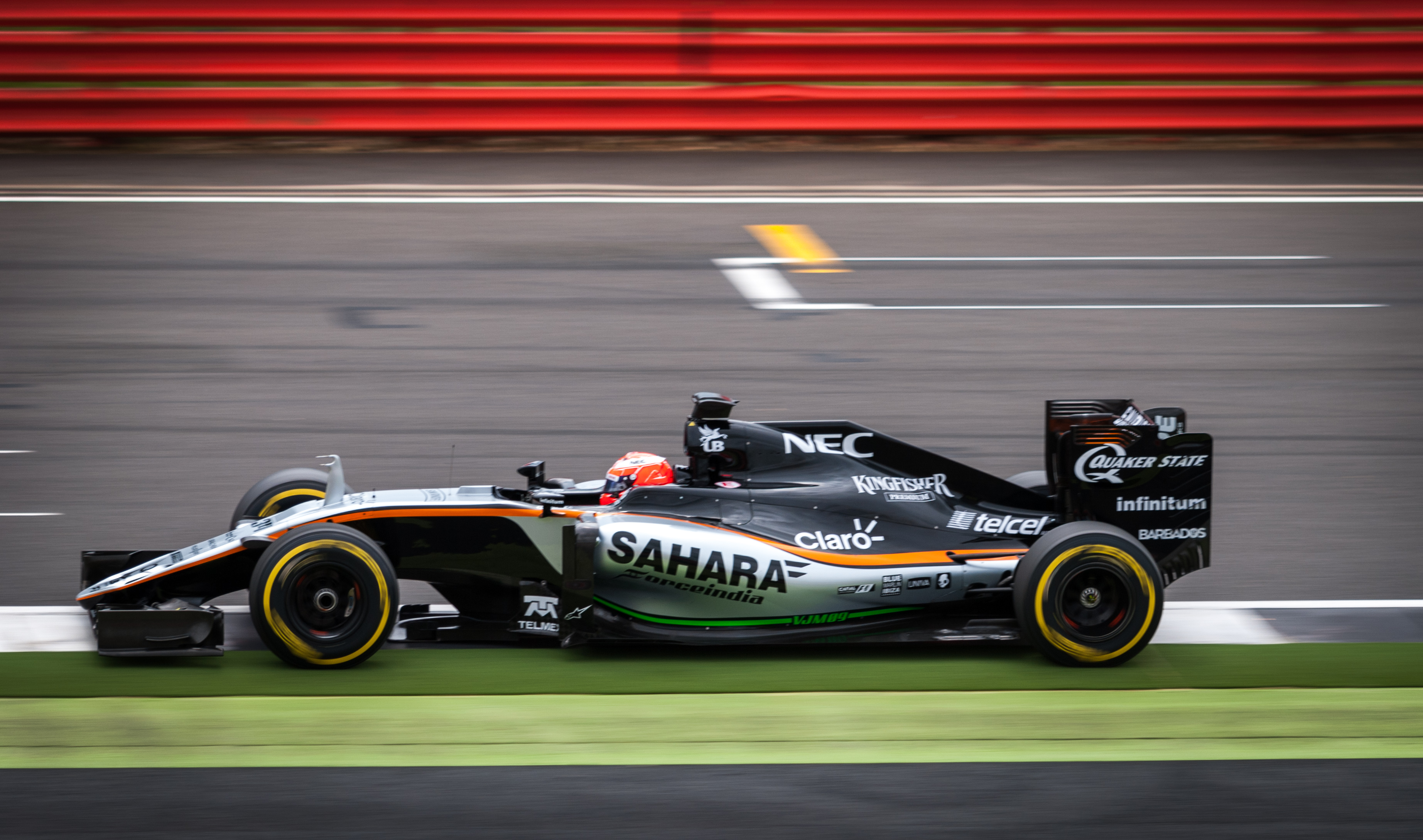
Mazepin during the mid-season Silverstone test with Force India, following the 2016 British Grand Prix

In 2016, Mazepin competed in the 2016 FIA Formula 3 European Championship for Hitech Grand Prix. He scored four points-scoring finishes and finished 20th in the championship, last of all full-time entrants. After being blocked during a session by Callum Ilott, Mazepin got into an altercation with the other driver, during which Mazepin hit Ilott in the face, resulting in a ban from the first race of the Hungaroring meeting. The sanction itself was controversial, with Frits van Amersfoort, boss of Ilott's team, believing the decision to be too lenient, calling it "a ridiculous decision by the stewards". Mazepin additionally completed a mid-season test session with Sahara Force India at Silverstone following the 2016 British Grand Prix.

==== 2017 ====
Despite the controversies of 2016, Mazepin was retained for another season. He improved significantly compared to his first year, scoring 108 points and finishing on the podium on three occasions. He finished in tenth, one place behind teammate Ralf Aron.

=== GP3 Series (2018) ===
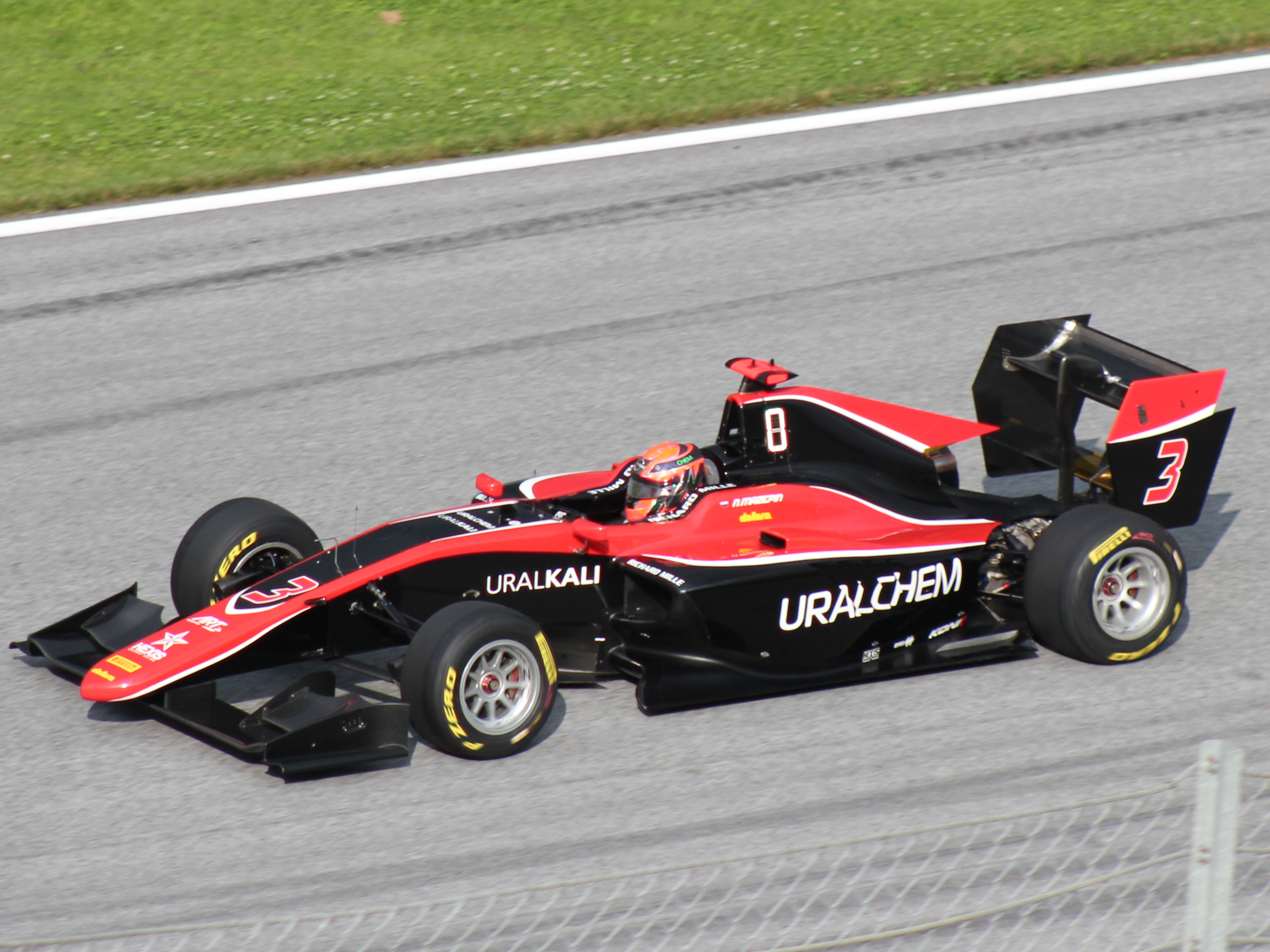
Mazepin at the 2018 Spielberg GP3 Series round

Mazepin moved to GP3 in 2018 to race for ART Grand Prix alongside Callum Ilott, Jake Hughes and eventual champion Anthoine Hubert. He won four races, the most of any driver that year, and finished second in the championship, only sixteen points behind Hubert. Furthermore, he helped his team secure the title in the team championship.

=== FIA Formula 2 (2019–2020) ===
==== 2019 ====
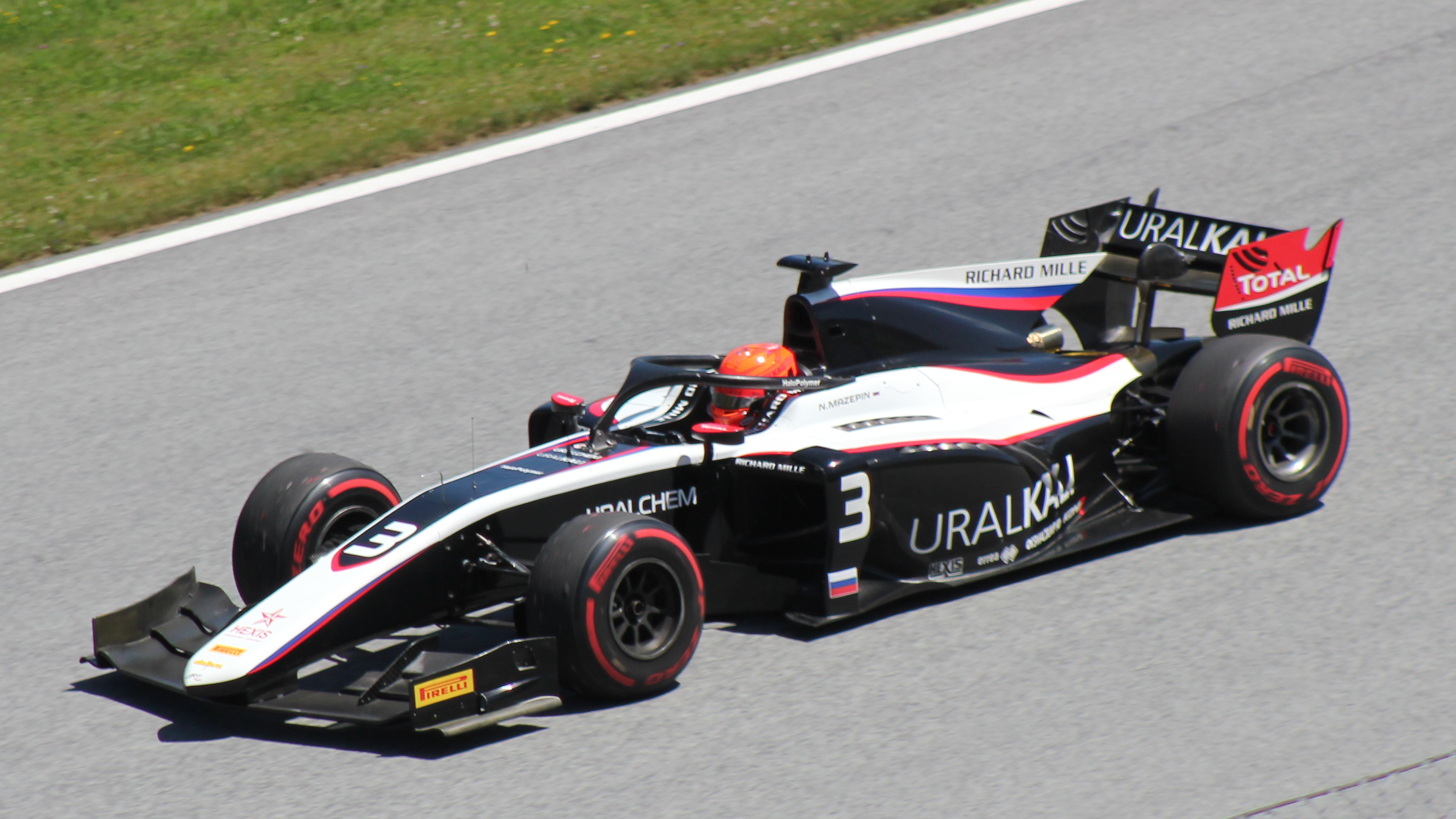
Mazepin at the 2019 Spielberg Formula 2 round with ART Grand Prix

In 2019, Mazepin progressed to Formula 2 to partner Nyck de Vries at ART Grand Prix. His season was marked by causing an accident with Nobuharu Matsushita in the Sochi sprint race. While his teammate ended up winning the championship, Mazepin ended the season in 18th place with eleven points.

==== 2020 ====
In 2020, Mazepin signed for the new Hitech Grand Prix Team to drive alongside Italian Luca Ghiotto. His first podium came at the Hungaroring with second place, before taking his first F2 victory in Britain. Mazepin also won the feature race at Mugello. On the final lap of the Belgian feature race, he pushed Carlin driver Yuki Tsunoda wide, and was given a five-second time penalty, denying himself victory.

== Formula One career ==
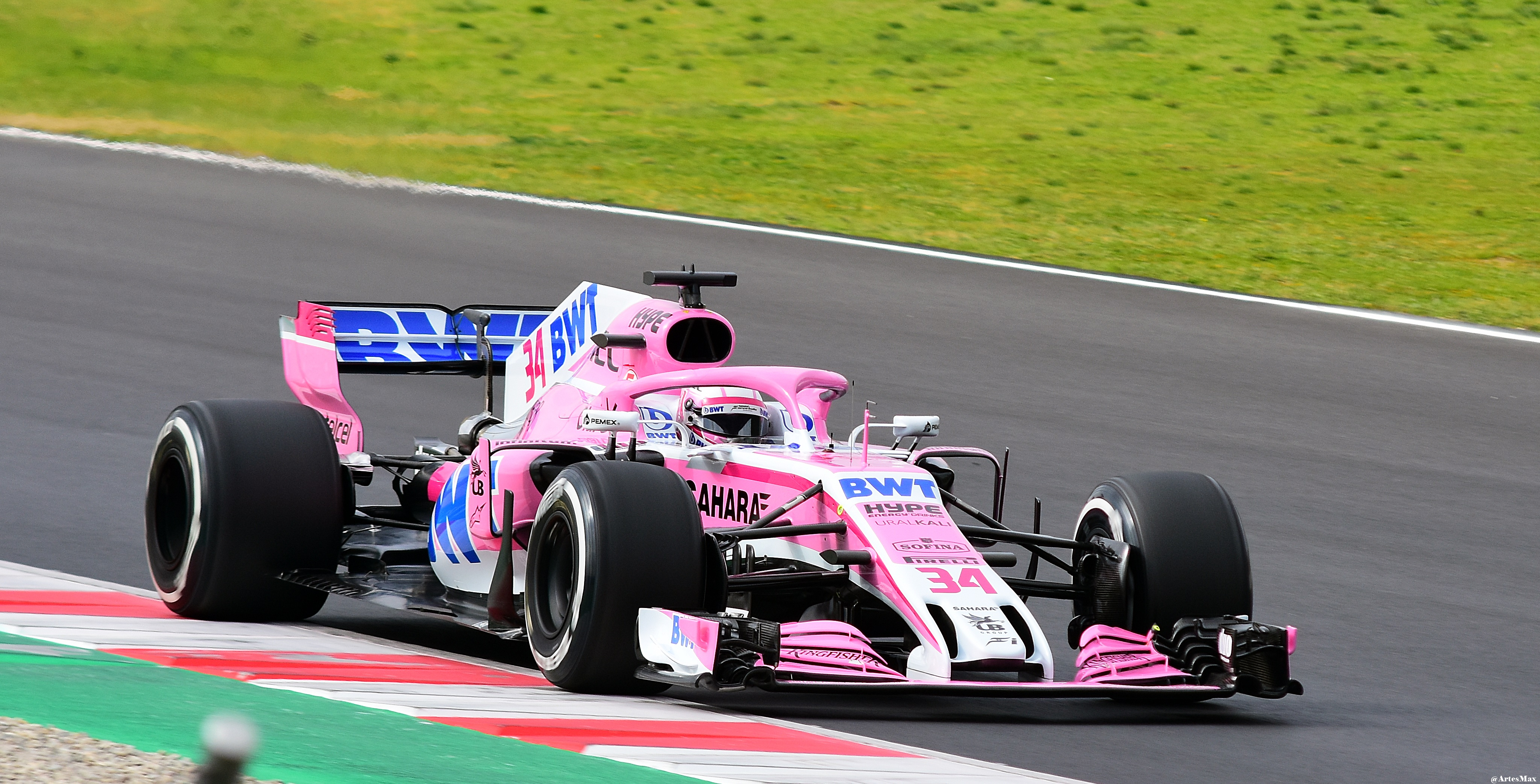
Mazepin testing the Force India VJM11 in Barcelona, 2018

Mazepin was named test driver of Sahara Force India in 2016 and made his Formula One testing debut in the in-season test at Silverstone, where he achieved a personal best lap time of 1:31.561. He stayed in that role for the following two seasons, racking up 100 laps at the Hungaroring in 2017 and 51 in 2018 at the same track. The following year he took part for Mercedes in the 2019 Barcelona test, where he topped the timing sheets with a time of 1:15.775.

=== Haas (2021) ===
==== 2021: Rookie season ====
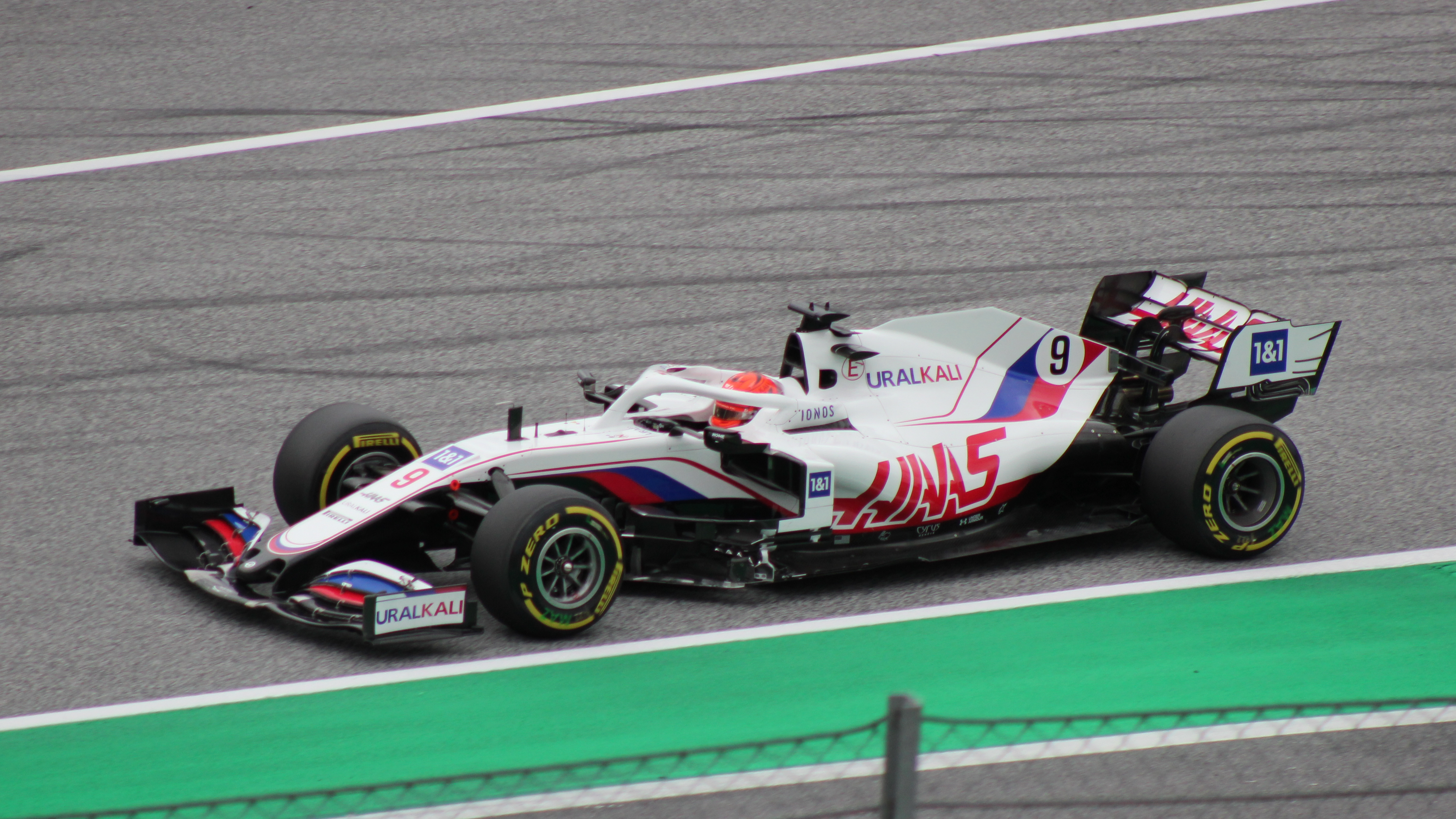
Mazepin at the 2021 Austrian Grand Prix

Mazepin joined Haas F1 Team for 2021 on a multi-year deal, partnering Mick Schumacher. He chose the number 9 as his permanent racing number. Mazepin competed under a neutral flag representing the Russian Automobile Federation in the 2021 Formula One World Championship after the Court of Arbitration for Sport upheld a World Anti-Doping Agency ban on Russia competing at World Championships in December 2020 due to state-sponsored doping of Russian athletes.

In his debut race, Mazepin crashed out on the first lap by losing control on the kerb at turn three. After finishing last in the Emilia Romagna Grand Prix, having spun twice in practice and blocked Antonio Giovinazzi in qualifying, Mazepin was given a five-second penalty for ignoring blue flags and blocking Sergio Pérez during the Portuguese Grand Prix. His first race in which he beat teammate Schumacher came in Monaco, and Mazepin achieved his best result of the season at the following round in Azerbaijan, largely thanks to four retirements affecting the rest of the grid.

Mazepin missed the season finale at Yas Marina due to a positive COVID-test on race day; he was not replaced for the event. He ended his debut season 21st in the standings, with no points scored throughout the year.

==== 2022 contract dispute ====
Mazepin was contracted to compete for Haas in the 2022 Formula One World Championship again under a neutral flag representing the Russian Automobile Federation like the 2021 championship, however on 5 March, Haas terminated both his contract and Uralkali's title sponsorship as part of the larger global response to the 2022 Russian invasion of Ukraine. Mazepin expressed disappointment at the decision, remarking on social media that his "ongoing willingness to accept the conditions proposed in order to continue were completely ignored". In a BBC interview, Mazepin stated that the sports sanctions were "cancel culture" against Russia. Mazepin also stated that he sees "tremendous risks in saying anything at all" regarding the Russian invasion of Ukraine.

In July 2022, Mazepin sued Haas in a Swiss court for unpaid wages. During the month, he told Match TV that despite his exit, he still follows Formula One closely when possible. Two years of legal proceedings and arbitration followed, with Haas having their assets seized at the 2024 Dutch Grand Prix amidst their legal battle with Uralkali.

Although the EU sanctions against him were dropped in 2024 after the decision of the Court of Justice of the European Union, Mazepin did not pursue an F1 return as the "time has come to write the next act of my life as an adult".

== Other racing ==
=== Rally raid ===
A self-professed rally raid fan, Mazepin participated in a test with Dakar Rally-winning truck team Kamaz Master in July 2021. Following his departure from Formula One in 2022, he expressed interest in switching to rally raid should he not return to F1. In his July 2022 interview with Match TV, Mazepin explained he intended to compete in off-road as long as he enjoyed it, and joked he would continue to do so if he could "physically walk and get into the car" as "there is no age limit in this sport."

To gain experience, Mazepin began training with former Dakar quad category winner Sergey Karyakin and his Snag Racing team. Karyakin described Mazepin as knowing "how to read the lines perfectly, he sees the dunes" and that "bearing in mind that it was the first time he tested the sand, the results were quite good."

Mazepin made his rally debut at the Ladoga Trophy in June 2022 before competing in the Silk Way Rally a month later, driving a Can-Am in the T3 category for Snag Racing. He won his class with a stage victory in the seventh leg. Speaking to TASS after the rally, Mazepin said rally raid and Formula One's lone similarities were "the steering wheel and four wheels. It was very hot, very challenging, and it was the real test. I am incredibly happy that I managed to win."

Scheduling conflicts prevented Mazepin from returning to the Silk Way in 2023, though he placed second at the Baja Astrakhan later that year. He recorded another runner-up finish at the 2024 Denis Davydov Baja.

In recognition of his rally success, Mazepin was named a Master of Sports of Russia on 29 May 2025.

=== Asian Le Mans Series ===
In 2023, Mazepin returned to international motorsport, making his endurance racing debut in the Asian Le Mans Series with 99 Racing competing under a neutral flag. At the first race in Dubai, Mazepin, along with teammates Neel Jani and Gonçalo Gomes, finished on the podium, with Jani narrowly losing out on second to Charlie Eastwood during the final stint. He and Jani finished fourth in the LMP2 driver's championship with a sixth in the second Dubai race, followed by seventh and second in the two Abu Dhabi rounds.

=== Middle East Trophy ===
In 2025, Mazepin joined the 2025 Middle East Trophy to drive for Graff Racing.

== Personal life ==
=== 2020 social media controversy ===
On 9 December 2020, Mazepin posted an Instagram story in which he appeared to inappropriately grope a woman's breasts. In a statement, the Haas F1 Team rebuked Mazepin's actions and called the video "abhorrent". Mazepin also released an apology, stating, "I have to hold myself to a higher standard as a Formula 1 driver and I acknowledge I have let myself and many people down," though the apology was deleted nine days later. In March 2021, Mazepin reiterated that he understood his actions were wrong. The woman in the video defended Mazepin and labelled his actions as a joke between the two. The woman has since posted content on her own social media, stating that she would have advised her younger self to "never let them touch you again or be disrespectful to you," and the two have unfollowed each other. The controversy led to the hashtag "#WeSayNoToMazepin" to trend on Twitter, calling for Mazepin's removal from the Haas F1 Team.

=== 2022 sanctions ===
In March 2022, Mazepin and his father, Dmitry, were included on the EU sanctions list following the 2022 Russian invasion of Ukraine. He was also later sanctioned by the United Kingdom and Canada over the same reason. In April 2022, a residential compound owned by Nikita and Dmitry in Portisco, Sardinia worth more than $114 million was seized by Italian authorities. Following his dismissal from Formula One, Mazepin created "We Compete as One", a foundation to support athletes excluded for "non-sporting decisions".

In 2023, Mazepin launched law suits against the EU, UK, and Canadian sanctions against him in a bid to revive his racing career. In June 2023, a UK high court rejected a bid to suspend the sanctions against him on an interim basis so he could travel to the UK to negotiate with F1 teams based there. In September 2023, the EU sanctions against Mazepin were partially lifted by general court order with him being allowed to visit the EU for activities related to motorsport, though he is still sanctioned by the EU generally and is not allowed to enter the EU for non-motorsport reasons.

In March 2024, the EU lifted the sanctions against Mazepin after the relevant decision of the Court of Justice of the European Union, which determined that the 'association' criterion, applied in respect of Mr Nikita Mazepin, implies the existence of a link going beyond a family relationship, established in the light of a set of indicia sufficiently specific, precise and consistent, and the Council did not discharge its burden of proof to establish such a link; the association between Mr Nikita Mazepin and his father is in no way established from an economic or capital perspective or by the existence of common interests linking them at the time when the maintaining acts were adopted.

== Karting record ==
=== Karting career summary ===
Season	Series	Team	Position
2010	WSK Super Master Series — 60 Mini	DR Srl	18th
2010	Russian Karting Championship		**1st**
2011	Andrea Margutti Trophy — 60 Mini		27th
2011	WSK Super Master Series — 60 Mini	Birel Motorsport	NC
2011	Italian CSAI Karting Championship — 60 Mini		69th
2012	Andrea Margutti Trophy — KF3	Chiesa Corse	18th
2012	Trofeo delle Industrie — KF3	Chiesa Corse	11th
2012	WSK Euro Series — KF3	Chiesa Corse	22nd
2012	CIK-FIA European Championship — KF3	Chiesa Corse	34th
2012	WSK Final Cup — KF3	Chiesa Corse	24th
2012	Copa Campeones Trophy — KF3	Chiesa Corse	4th
2012	Grand Prix Open Karting — KF3		21st
2013	South Garda Winter Cup — KF3		24th
2013	Italian Championship — KF3		9th
2013	Kartmasters British Grand Prix — Rotax Junior		5th
2013	WSK Euro Series — KFJ	Tony Kart Racing Team	18th
2013	WSK Super Master Series — KFJ	Tony Kart Racing Team	4th
2013	CIK-FIA European Championship — KFJ	Tony Kart Racing Team	38th
2013	CIK-FIA World Championship — KFJ	Tony Kart Racing Team	18th
2013	WSK Final Cup — KFJ	Tony Kart Racing Team	16th
2014	South Garda Winter Cup — KF2	Tony Kart Racing Team	10th
2014	WSK Champions Cup — KF	Tony Kart Racing Team	6th
2014	WSK Super Master Series — KF	Tony Kart Racing Team	8th
2014	CIK-FIA European Championship — KF	Tony Kart Racing Team	23rd
2014	CIK-FIA World Championship — KF	Tony Kart Racing Team	**2nd**

=== Complete CIK-FIA Karting European Championship results ===
(key) (Races in bold indicate pole position; races in italics indicate fastest lap)

Year	Team	Class	1	2	3	4	5	6	7	8	DC	Points
2012	Chiesa Corse	KF3	PSB; R1; 17	PSB; R2; 17	PFI; R1; 30	PFI; R2; 30					34th	0
2013	Tony Kart Racing Team	KFJ	ALC; 28	ORT; DNQ							38th	0
2014	Tony Kart Racing Team	KF	LAC; QH; 9	LAC; R 18	ZUE; QH; 10	ZUE; R 14	GEN; QH; 17	GEN; R 20	PFI; QH; 29	PFI; R 24	23rd	5

=== Complete Karting World Championship results ===
Year	Team	Class	Main classification
2013	(Italy) Tony Kart Racing Team	KFJ	18th
2014	(Italy) Tony Kart Racing Team	KF	**2nd**

== Racing record ==
=== Racing career summary ===
Season	Series	Team	Races	Wins	Poles	F/Laps	Podiums	Points	Position
2014–15	MRF Challenge Formula 2000	MRF Racing	4	0	0	0	1	36	10th
2015	Formula Renault 2.0 NEC	Josef Kaufmann Racing	16	0	0	0	1	125.5	12th
2015	Eurocup Formula Renault 2.0	Josef Kaufmann Racing	7	0	0	0	0	—N/a	NC†
2015	Toyota Racing Series	ETEC Motorsport	16	0	0	0	0	304	18th
2016	FIA Formula 3 European Championship	Hitech GP	30	0	0	0	0	10	20th
2016	Macau Grand Prix	Hitech GP	1	0	0	0	0	N/A	DNF
2016	Eurocup Formula Renault 2.0	AVF by Adrián Vallés	4	0	0	0	0	11	16th
2016	BRDC British Formula 3 Championship	Carlin	3	1	0	0	1	51	23rd
2017	FIA Formula 3 European Championship	Hitech GP	30	0	0	1	3	108	10th
2018	GP3 Series	ART Grand Prix	18	4	1	5	8	198	**2nd**
2019	FIA Formula 2 Championship	ART Grand Prix	22	0	0	0	0	11	18th
2019–20	F3 Asian Championship	Hitech Grand Prix	15	0	0	0	4	186	**3rd**
2020	FIA Formula 2 Championship	Hitech Grand Prix	24	2	0	2	6	164	5th
2021	Formula One	Uralkali Haas F1 Team	22	0	0	0	0	0	21st
2022	Formula One	Uralkali Haas F1 Team	Pre-season test driver						
2022	Silk Way Rally - T3	SNAG Racing	1	1	—	—	1	30	**1st**
2023	Asian Le Mans Series – LMP2	99 Racing	4	0	2	0	2	49	4th
2023–24	Asian Le Mans Series – LMP2	99 Racing	3	2	0	1	3	68	4th
2025	Middle East Trophy – GTX	Graff Racing	1	0	0	0	0	—N/a	NC†
2026	Spezial Tourenwagen Trophy	Team Motopark							
2026	International GT Open	Team Motopark	3	0	0	0	0	14	24th
2026	GT World Challenge Europe Endurance Cup	Team Motopark	1	0	0	0	0	0	NC†

^{†} As Mazepin was a guest driver, he was ineligible for points.

=== Complete MRF Challenge Formula 2000 results ===
(key) (Races in bold indicate pole position; races in italics indicate fastest lap)

Year	1	2	3	4	5	6	7	8	9	10	11	12	DC	Points
2014–15	LOS; 1; 5	LOS; 2; 2	LOS; 3 Ret	LOS; 4; 6	BHR; 1	BHR; 2	BHR; 3	BHR; 4	MMR; 1	MMR; 2	MMR; 3	MMR; 4	10th	36

=== Complete Toyota Racing Series results ===
(key) (Races in bold indicate pole position; races in italics indicate fastest lap)

Year	Team	1	2	3	4	5	6	7	8	9	10	11	12	13	14	15	16	DC	Points
2015	ETEC Motorsport	RUA; 1 Ret	RUA; 2; 13	RUA; 3 Ret	TER; 1; 13	TER; 2; 16	TER; 3; 15	HMP; 1; 11	HMP; 2 Ret	HMP; 3; 8	TAU; 1; 13	TAU; 2; 10	TAU; 3; 17	TAU; 4; 15	MAN; 1; 20	MAN; 2 Ret	MAN; 3; 11	18th	304

=== Complete Eurocup Formula Renault 2.0 results ===
(key) (Races in bold indicate pole position; races in italics indicate fastest lap)

Year	Entrant	1	2	3	4	5	6	7	8	9	10	11	12	13	14	15	16	17	DC	Points
2015	Josef Kaufmann Racing	ALC; 1	ALC; 2	ALC; 3	SPA; 1; 24	SPA; 2; 14	HUN; 1; 17	HUN; 2; 14	SIL; 1; 20	SIL; 2; 12	SIL; 3; 18	NÜR; 1	NÜR; 2	LMS; 1	LMS; 2	JER; 1	JER; 2	JER; 3	NC†	0
2016	AVF	ALC; 1	ALC; 2	ALC; 3	MON; 1; 5	MNZ; 1; 12	MNZ; 2; 8	MNZ; 3 Ret	RBR; 1	RBR; 2	LEC; 1	LEC; 2	SPA; 1	SPA; 2	EST; 1	EST; 2			16th	11

† As Mazepin was a guest driver, he was ineligible for points

=== Complete Formula Renault 2.0 Northern European Cup results ===
(key) (Races in bold indicate pole position; races in italics indicate fastest lap)

Year	Team	1	2	3	4	5	6	7	8	9	10	11	12	13	14	15	16	DC	Points
2015	Josef Kaufmann Racing	MNZ; 1; 10	MNZ; 2 Ret	SIL; 1; 14	SIL; 2 Ret	RBR; 1; 9	RBR; 2 Ret	RBR; 3; 3	SPA; 1; 8	SPA; 2; 10	ASS; 1; 12	ASS; 2; 12	NÜR; 1; 8	NÜR; 2; 13	HOC; 1; 6	HOC; 2 Ret	HOC; 3; 18	12th	125.5

=== Complete FIA Formula 3 European Championship results ===
(key) (Races in bold indicate pole position; races in italics indicate fastest lap)

Year	Entrant	Engine	1	2	3	4	5	6	7	8	9	10	11	12	13	14	15	16	17	18	19	20	21	22	23	24	25	26	27	28	29	30	DC	Points
2016	Hitech GP	Mercedes	LEC; 1; 19	LEC; 2; 12	LEC; 3; 10	HUN; 1 EX	HUN; 2 Ret	HUN; 3; 13	PAU; 1; 16	PAU; 2; 13	PAU; 3 Ret	RBR; 1; 14	RBR; 2; 17	RBR; 3; 14	NOR; 1; 11	NOR; 2; 11	NOR; 3; 11	ZAN; 1; 17	ZAN; 2; 15	ZAN; 3; 17	SPA; 1; 12	SPA; 2 Ret	SPA; 3; 8	NÜR; 1; 16	NÜR; 2; 14	NÜR; 3; 16	IMO; 1; 13	IMO; 2; 11	IMO; 3; 15	HOC; 1; 8	HOC; 2; 10	HOC; 3 Ret	20th	10
2017	Hitech GP	Mercedes	SIL; 1 Ret	SIL; 2; 15	SIL; 3; 7	MNZ; 1; 11	MNZ; 2; 10	MNZ; 3; 11	PAU; 1; 4	PAU; 2; 7	PAU; 3 Ret	HUN; 1; 12	HUN; 2; 11	HUN; 3; 10	NOR; 1; 10	NOR; 2; 18	NOR; 3; 10	SPA; 1; 2	SPA; 2; 7	SPA; 3; 11	ZAN; 1; 11	ZAN; 2; 11	ZAN; 3; 10	NÜR; 1 Ret	NÜR; 2; 11	NÜR; 3; 16	RBR; 1 Ret	RBR; 2; 3	RBR; 3; 2	HOC; 1; 6	HOC; 2; 6	HOC; 3; 7	10th	108

=== Complete Macau Grand Prix results ===
Year	Team	Car	Qualifying	Quali Race	Main race
2016	(United Kingdom) Hitech GP	Dallara F312	18th	18th	DNF

=== Complete GP3 Series results ===
(key) (Races in bold indicate pole position; races in italics indicate fastest lap)

Year	Entrant	1	2	3	4	5	6	7	8	9	10	11	12	13	14	15	16	17	18	Pos	Points
2018	ART Grand Prix	CAT; FEA; 1	CAT; SPR; 10	LEC; FEA; 2	LEC; SPR; 5	RBR; FEA; 13	RBR; SPR; 7	SIL; FEA; 2	SIL; SPR; 7	HUN; FEA; 1	HUN; SPR; 12	SPA; FEA; 5	SPA; SPR; 1	MNZ; FEA; 5	MNZ; SPR; 3	SOC; FEA; 2	SOC; SPR; Ret	**YMC**; **FEA**; 5	YMC; SPR; 1	2nd	198

=== Complete FIA Formula 2 Championship results ===
(key) (Races in bold indicate pole position; races in italics indicate points for the fastest lap of top ten finishers)

Year	Entrant	1	2	3	4	5	6	7	8	9	10	11	12	13	14	15	16	17	18	19	20	21	22	23	24	DC	Points
2019	ART Grand Prix	BHR; FEA; 19	BHR; SPR; 13	BAK; FEA; 8	BAK; SPR; Ret	CAT; FEA; 17	CAT; SPR; 14	MON; FEA; 10	MON; SPR; 8	LEC; FEA; Ret	LEC; SPR; 16	RBR; FEA; 12	RBR; SPR; 11	SIL; FEA; 16†	SIL; SPR; 12	HUN; FEA; 12	HUN; SPR; 15	SPA; FEA; C	SPA; SPR; C	MNZ; FEA; 11	MNZ; SPR; 9	SOC; FEA; 8	SOC; SPR; Ret	YMC; FEA; 10	YMC; SPR; 17†	18th	11
2020	Hitech Grand Prix	RBR1; FEA; 14	RBR1; SPR; 10	RBR2; FEA; 14	RBR2; SPR; 8	HUN; FEA; 2	HUN; SPR; 5	SIL1; FEA; 1	SIL1; SPR; 5	SIL2; FEA; 4	SIL2; SPR; 8	CAT; FEA; 13	CAT; SPR; 6	SPA; FEA; 2	SPA; SPR; 4	MNZ; FEA; NC	MNZ; SPR; 8	MUG; FEA; 1	MUG; SPR; 18	SOC; FEA; 7	SOC; SPR; 2	BHR1; FEA; 5	BHR1; SPR; 2	BHR2; FEA; 9	BHR2; SPR; 9	5th	164

^{†} Did not finish, but was classified as he had completed more than 90% of the race distance.

=== Complete F3 Asian Championship results ===
(key) (Races in bold indicate pole position; races in italics indicate fastest lap)

Year	Entrant	1	2	3	4	5	6	7	8	9	10	11	12	13	14	15	DC	Points
2019–20	Hitech Grand Prix	SEP; 1; 4	SEP; 2; 2	SEP; 3; 5	DUB; 1; 4	DUB; 2; 4	DUB; 3; 6	ABU; 1; 2	ABU; 2; 6	ABU; 3; 3	SEP; 1; 5	SEP; 2; 2	SEP; 3; 4	CHA; 1; 5	CHA; 2; 8	CHA; 3; 8	3rd	186

=== Complete Formula One results ===
Year	Entrant	Chassis	Engine	1	2	3	4	5	6	7	8	9	10	11	12	13	14	15	16	17	18	19	20	21	22	WDC	Points
2021	Uralkali Haas F1 Team	Haas VF-21	Ferrari 065/6 1.6 V6 t	BHR; Ret	EMI; 17	POR; 19	ESP; 19	MON; 17	AZE; 14	FRA; 20	STY; 18	AUT; 19	GBR; 17	HUN; Ret	BEL; 17	NED; Ret	ITA; Ret	RUS; 18	TUR; 20	USA; 17	MXC; 18	SAP; 17	QAT; 18	SAU; Ret	ABU; WD	21st	0

=== Complete Asian Le Mans Series results ===
(key) (Races in bold indicate pole position; results in italics indicate fastest lap)

Year	Entrant	Class	Chassis	Engine	1	2	3	4	5	Rank	Points
2023	99 Racing	LMP2	Oreca 07	Gibson GK428 4.2 L V8	DUB; 1; 3	DUB; 2; 6	**ABU**; **1**; 7	**ABU**; **2**; 2		4th	49
2023–24	99 Racing	LMP2	Oreca 07	Gibson GK428 4.2 L V8	SEP; 1; 1	SEP; 2; 2	DUB; 1	ABU; 1	ABU; 2	4th	68
