= Ahmad Al Harthy =

Omani racing driver (born 1981)

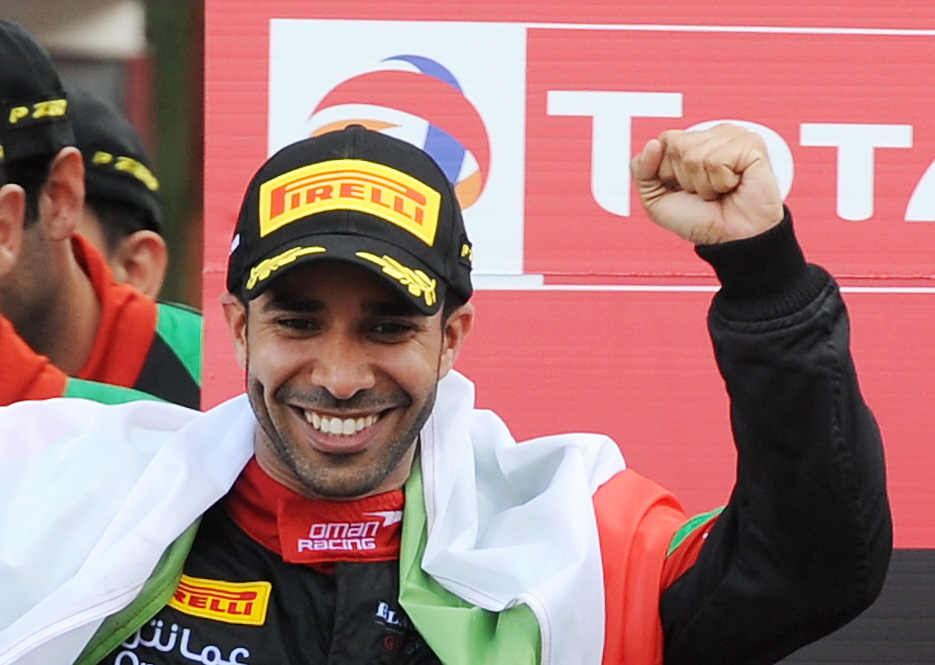
- Al Harthy in 2017
- Nationality: Omani
- Born: 31 August 1981 (age 45) Muscat, Oman

Blancpain GT Series Endurance Cup career
- Debut season: 2013
- Current team: Oman Racing
- Categorisation: FIA Silver (until 2015, 2018–2019); FIA Bronze (2016–2017, 2020–)
- Car number: 97
- Starts: 24
- Wins: 1
- Poles: 2
- Fastest laps: 0
- Best finish: Pro-Am Champion in 2017

Previous series
- 2013–15 2011–12 2011–12 2011 2010–12 2009–10 2007–09 2007 2006: British GT Championship; Porsche Supercup; Porsche GT3 Cup Challenge Middle East; Porsche Carrera Cup France; Porsche Carrera Cup GB; Supercars Middle East Championship; Formula Renault BARC; British Formula Renault Winter Series; Thunder Arabia Middle Eastern Series

Championship titles
- 2012 2017: Porsche Carrera Cup GB – Pro/Am 1 Blancpain GT Series Endurance Cup - Pro/Am

Ahmad Al Harthy (born 31 August 1981 in Muscat, Oman) is an Omani racing driver who currently competes in the FIA World Endurance Championship in the LMGT3 Class in the No. 46 BMW M4 GT3 for BMW M Team WRT alongside nine-time MotoGP Champion Valentino Rossi and ADAC GT Masters champion, two time 24 Hours of Nürburgring winner, and DTM vice champion, Kelvin Van Der Linde. He won the 2012 Porsche Carrera Cup Great Britain Pro-Am 1 Championship and in 2017 became the Blancpain Endurance Cup Pro-Am Champion along with British team-mate Jonny Adam.

== Career ==
=== Early years ===
Although dabbling with karting at the age of seven, following a visit with his older brother to his local kart track in Oman, it wasn't until Al Harthy reached his early 20s that he was able to set-out on the path to a career in motorsport.

Al Harthy's first car racing experience came in 2006 in the Bahrain based Thunder Arabia Championship where he broke new ground as the first Omani born driver to compete in single-seater (or formula) racing. Finishing the season as Vice-Champion with two race wins and ten podiums from 14 races, Al Harthy sought a fresh challenge for the following year and decided to pit himself against the best competition in Britain in the Formula Renault BARC Championship.

=== Formula Renault BARC ===
Joining the Hillspeed team at the start of 2007, Al Harthy went on to enjoy a successful three year stint with the squad. Improving steadily throughout his first season, in which he achieved his debut Formula Renault podiums in the end-of-year Winter Championship, he became a consistent front-runner in 2008. Concluding his second season in the category fifth overall, Al Harthy secured three podium finishes along the way and also qualified on pole position twice.

Al Harthy's final year of Formula Renault BARC action culminated very impressively and he finished the season Vice-Champion with six podiums to his credit and two fastest race laps. As it later transpired, the 2009 championship would be his last in single-seater racing before switching his attention to the world of sportscar competition.

During 2009 though, Al Harthy also made his debut in the Chevrolet Supercars Middle East Championship in the headline SC09 Class where he piloted a Chevrolet Lumina during the Formula One Grand Prix support race at Sakhir in Bahrain. He achieved one podium finish from the two races contested.

=== Porsche Carrera Cup GB Championship ===
For the 2010 motor racing season, Al Harthy chose to move into sportscar racing by signing to race for the Redline Racing team in the Porsche Carrera Cup Great Britain Championship – a support category to the UK's biggest motor racing series, the Dunlop MSA British Touring Car Championship. It was the most high profile year of action of his career at that point, Al Harthy adapted to the new discipline and became a regular podium contender in the Pro-Am 1 Class of the championship.

Making six visits to the rostrum over the course of the season, Al Harthy ended the year fourth overall in the Pro-Am 1 Class driver standings and 11th overall in the main championship. Increasing his profile throughout the year, Al Harthy's success achieved notable exposure for his portfolio of homegrown sponsors.

One of Al Harthy's personal highlights of 2010 was his involvement in the Porsche Carrera Cup France support event to the legendary 24 Hours of Le Mans Race. Becoming the first Omani to ever compete at the world famous Circuit de la Sarthe, his participation was also notable for a further reason – the Porsche race marked the 40th anniversary of the marque's first 24 Hours of Le Mans victory and this coincided with the 40th anniversary of His Majesty Sultan Qaboos bin Said’s reign in Oman.

Al Harthy also made selected appearances in the Chevrolet Supercars ME Championship once again but several mechanical problems blunted his charge.

In 2011, Al Harthy returned to the Porsche Carrera Cup Great Britain Championship but prior to the start of the season he made headlines and history on the streets of his home city of Muscat by conducting passenger rides in a Porsche 911 GT3 race car. The carefully arranged event ran in conjunction with the support of the Royal Oman Police and the Oman Automobile Association.

Enjoying a successful year, Al Harthy once again competed with Redline Racing but with the team entry branded as the Oman Air Racing Team in deference to title sponsor Oman Air. His portfolio of commercial backers also included the Oman Ministry of Tourism, Ministry of Sports Affairs, the National Bank of Oman and Nawras.

Finishing his second season in the championship third overall in the Pro-Am 1 Class, Al Harthy took two wins and a total of 12 podiums. The championship included a visit to the notorious Nürburgring-Nordschleife and the Omani also made an outing in Porsche Carrera Cup France while also debuting in the Porsche Mobil 1 Supercup at Silverstone.

In November 2011, Al Harthy competed in the burgeoning Porsche GT3 Cup Challenge Middle East. From six races contested, he chalked-up a tally of three podiums including lights-to-flag victory during the FIA Formula One World Championship support race at Yas Marina Circuit in Abu Dhabi. He also had the opportunity to compete in the UAE GT Championship where he won on his debut, driving a Porsche 911 GT3, partnering James Sutton.

On 21 February 2012 at a press conference in Muscat, Oman, Al Harthy announced his continued participation in Porsche Carrera Cup Great Britain for a third successive year. Retaining Oman Air as his title sponsor, the Oman Air Racing Team was once again fielded by Redline Racing. From the outset, Al Harthy was one of the favourites to win the Pro-Am 1 title and he did so in style after a remarkably successful season. Winning 12 races and taking a total of 17 Pro-Am 1 podiums from the 20 races contested, he also secured a string of fastest laps and class pole positions. Al Harthy also made his second career appearance in the Porsche Mobil 1 Supercup in 2012 during the FIA Formula One World Championship British Grand Prix weekend at Silverstone. An unfortunate puncture resulted in retirement.

=== British GT Championship and Blancpain Endurance Cup ===
In March 2013, Al Harthy and chief sponsor Oman Air announced a move from 'sprint' racing into 'endurance' competition after confirming a deal to graduate into the Avon Tyres British GT Championship with the Motorbase Performance team. Partnered by reigning British GT Champion Michael Caine, the duo ran under the Oman Air Motorbase banner in a Porsche 997 GT3-R. Al Harthy went on to end his maiden endurance racing campaign an impressive fifth in the championship - he and Caine claimed two race victories along the way, round five at Snetterton Motor Racing Circuit and round eight at Circuit Park Zandvoort in the Netherlands.

Al Harthy also had the opportunity in 2013 to dovetail his British GT season with a campaign in the pan-European Blancpain Endurance Series, also at the wheel of a Porsche 997 GT3-R but with the Slovakian ARC Bratislava squad in the GTR Class. Partnering team owner Miro Konopka, and running with headline sponsorship from the National Bank of Oman, Al Harthy achieved one class victory during the five-round season at Silverstone Circuit in June.

Al Harthy remained with Motorbase Performance for the 2014 season, racing an Aston Martin Vantage GT3 alongside Michael Caine in the British GT Championship and with Caine and Stephen Jelley in the Blancpain Endurance Series. In the British series Al Harthy and Caine became Vice-Champions with two victories, at Oulton Park and Silverstone, and two other podium finishes. The Omani then reunited with Porsche for the 2014/2015 Porsche GT3 Cup Challenge Middle East.

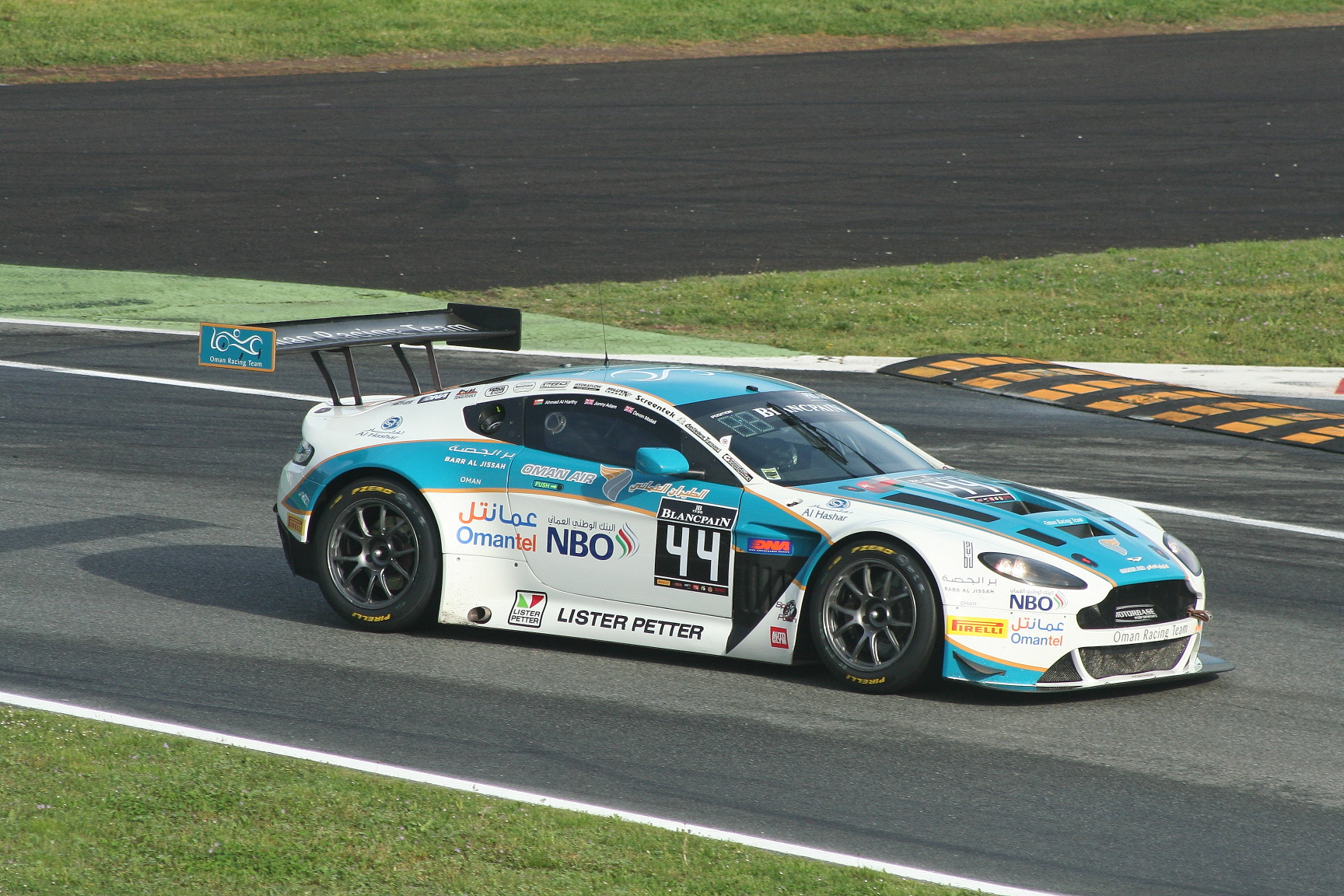
Al Harthy at the 2016 Blancpain Endurance Cup Monza Round

For the main 2015 motorsport season, he again combined British GT and Blancpain Endurance Series campaigns with the Motorbase-engineered Oman Racing Team and once again mounted a front-running challenge with the Aston Martin Vantage GT3 - taking a maiden outright top 10 finish in Blancpain during the season finale at the Nurburgring in Germany. At the end of the year, Al Harthy made his maiden appearance in the Gulf 12 Hours at Yas Marina Circuit in Abu Dhabi with the Oman Racing Team. Partnered by Jonny Adam and Darren Turner, the trio scorched to a fantastic podium finish.

Sticking with the trusty Aston Martin Vantage GT3 for 2016, Al Harthy - along with Adam - focused exclusively on the re-branded Blancpain Endurance Cup. For the longer races, requiring more than two drivers per entry, British driver Devon Modell joined the Oman Racing regulars. Ending the season fourth in the Pro-Am championship, the season highlight was undoubtedly the maiden Pro-Am podium finish achieved during round two at Silverstone Grand Prix Circuit with other major results including seventh in Pro-Am at the world renowned Total 24 Hours of Spa.

Celebrating the 10th anniversary of 'Oman Racing' in 2017, Al Harthy continued his partnership Adam but with the engineering of the Aston Martin transferring to British squad TF Sport, headed by ex-racer Tom Ferrier. Beginning the Blancpain Endurance Cup season perfectly with their first Pro-Am victory at Monza in Italy, Al Harthy and Adam finished second in Pro-Am in round two at Silverstone, second again at Paul Ricard in France - where they were joined by Turkish racer Salih Yoluc - and then claimed a runner-up spot in Pro-Am during July's Total 24 Hours of Spa.

Winning the coveted Pro-Am title with a round to spare, and continuing the squad's 100% podium finishing record for the season, Al Harthy and Adam were again joined by Yoluc for the twice-round-the-clock challenge along with British driver Euan Hankey.

During a break in the Blancpain calendar mid-season, Al Harthy was joined by young British racer Tom Jackson for the prestigious Michelin Le Mans Cup races at the Circuit de la Sarthe in Le Mans, France, which run as part of the support package to the world renowned Le Mans 24 Hours. Winning the GTE class of both contests, which also featured LMP3 'prototype' cars, the Oman Racing duo delivered highly impressive performances in the two 55-minute races.

== Racing record ==
=== Complete British GT Championship results ===
(key) (Races in bold indicate pole position) (Races in italics indicate fastest lap)

Year	Team	Car	Class	1	2	3	4	5	6	7	8	9	10	DC	Points
2013	Oman Air Motorbase	Porsche 997 GT3-R	GT3	OUL; 1; 4	OUL; 2; 9	ROC; 1; 6	SIL; 1; 8	SNE; 1; 1	SNE; 2; 8	BRH; 1; 7	**ZAN**; **1**; 1	ZAN; 2; 9	DON; 1; 12	5th	97
2014	Oman Racing Team	Aston Martin V12 Vantage GT3	GT3	**OUL**; **1**; 1	OUL; 2; 7	ROC; 1; 10	SIL; 1; 1	SNE; 1; 8	SNE; 2; 12	SPA; 1; 2	SPA; 2; 10	BRH; 1; 2	**DON**; **1**; 4	2nd	138
2015	Oman Racing Team	Aston Martin V12 Vantage GT3	GT3	OUL; 1; 10	OUL; 2; 25	ROC; 1; 2	SIL; 1; 4	SPA; 1; 11	BRH; 1 Ret	SNE; 1; 9	SNE; 2; 7	DON; 1; 9		8th	57
2021	Oman Racing Team with TF Sport	Aston Martin Vantage AMR GT3	GT3	BRH; 1	SIL; 1	DON; 1	SPA; 1	**SNE**; **1**; 1	SNE; 2; 4	OUL; 1	OUL; 2	DON; 1		NC†	0†

^{†} As Al Harthy was a guest driver, he was ineligible to score points.

=== Complete GT World Challenge Europe results ===
==== GT World Challenge Europe Endurance Cup ====
(key) (Races in bold indicate pole position) (Races in italics indicate fastest lap)

Year	Team	Car	Class	1	2	3	4	5	6	7	Pos.	Points
2013	ARC Bratislava	Porsche 997 GT3-R	Am	MNZ; 33	SIL; 25	LEC; 51	SPA; 6H; Ret	SPA; 12H; Ret	SPA; 24H; Ret	NÜR; Ret	15th	29
2014	Oman Racing Team	Aston Martin V12 Vantage GT3	Pro	MNZ; DNS	SIL; 10	LEC; 31	SPA; 6H; 31	SPA; 12H; 27	SPA; 24H; Ret	NÜR; 32	25th	3
2015	Oman Racing Team	Aston Martin V12 Vantage GT3	Pro	MNZ; 28	SIL; 19	LEC; 16				NÜR; 10	26th	2
2015	Oman Racing Team	Aston Martin V12 Vantage GT3	Pro-Am				SPA; 6H; 24	SPA; 12H; 17	SPA; 24H; 30		27th	4
2016	Oman Racing Team	Aston Martin V12 Vantage GT3	Pro-Am	MNZ; 13	SIL; 18	LEC; 33	SPA; 6H; 14	SPA; 12H; 44	SPA; 24H; 24	**NÜR**; 26	4th	53
2017	Oman Racing Team with TF Sport	Aston Martin V12 Vantage GT3	Pro-Am	**MNZ**; 7	SIL; 21	LEC; 14	SPA; 6H; 9	SPA; 12H; 14	**SPA**; **24H**; 15	CAT; 25	1st	116
2018	Oman Racing with TF Sport	Aston Martin Vantage AMR GT3	Silver	MNZ; 19	SIL; 39	LEC; 19	SPA; 6H; 61	SPA; 12H; 61	SPA; 24H; Ret	CAT; 22	7th	47
2019	Oman Racing with TF Sport	Aston Martin Vantage AMR GT3	Pro-Am	**MNZ**; 35	**SIL**; 23	**LEC**; 26	SPA; 6H; 26	SPA; 12H; 20	SPA; 24H; 22	CAT; 14	1st	122
2021	Oman Racing Team with TF Sport	Aston Martin Vantage AMR GT3	Pro-Am	MNZ	LEC	SPA; 6H	SPA; 12H	SPA; 24H	NÜR; 26	CAT; 27	19th	25
2022	Barwell Motorsport	Lamborghini Huracán GT3 Evo	Gold	IMO	LEC	**SPA**; **6H**; 39	**SPA**; **12H**; 34	**SPA**; **24H**; Ret	HOC	CAT	24th	9
2024	OQ by Oman Racing	BMW M4 GT3	Bronze	LEC; 27	SPA; 6H; 43	SPA; 12H; 34	SPA; 24H; Ret	NÜR; 35	MNZ; 1	JED; 19	4th	64
2026	Oman Racing by Century Motorsport	BMW M4 GT3 Evo	Bronze	LEC; 29	MNZ; 12	SPA; 6H; 55	SPA; 12H; 48	SPA; 24H; Ret	NÜR; 33	ALG; 26	8th	49

=== Complete Asian Le Mans Series results ===
(key) (Races in bold indicate pole position; results in italics indicate fastest lap)

Year	Entrant	Class	Chassis	Engine	1	2	3	4	5	Rank	Points
2021	Oman Racing Team with TF Sport	GT	Aston Martin Vantage AMR GT3	Aston Martin 4.0 L Turbo V8	DUB; 1; 7	DUB; 2; 7	ABU; 1 Ret	ABU; 2; 4		8th	24
2022	Oman Racing Team with TF Sport	GT	Aston Martin Vantage AMR GT3	Aston Martin 4.0 L Turbo V8	DUB; 1; 6	DUB; 2; 5	ABU; 1; 5	ABU; 2; 4		5th	40
2023	99 Racing	LMP2	Oreca 07	Gibson GK428 4.2 L V8	DUB; 1	DUB; 2	**ABU**; **1**; 7	**ABU**; **2**; 2		9th	26
2023–24	99 Racing	LMP2	Oreca 07	Gibson GK428 4.2 L V8	SEP; 1; 1	SEP; 2; 2	DUB; 1; 1	**ABU**; **1** Ret	**ABU**; **2**; 11	3rd	70

=== Complete European Le Mans Series results ===
(key) (Races in bold indicate pole position; results in italics indicate fastest lap)

Year	Entrant	Class	Chassis	Engine	1	2	3	4	5	6	Rank	Points
2022	Oman Racing with TF Sport	LMGTE	Aston Martin Vantage AMR	Aston Martin 4.0 L Turbo V8	LEC; Ret	**IMO**; 1	MNZ; 10	**CAT**; 10	SPA; 4	ALG; 2	5th	59

=== Complete FIA World Endurance Championship results ===
(key) (Races in bold indicate pole position; races in italics indicate fastest lap)

Year	Entrant	Class	Chassis	Engine	1	2	3	4	5	6	7	8	Rank	Points
2023	ORT by TF Sport	LMGTE Am	Aston Martin Vantage AMR	Aston Martin 4.0 L Turbo V8	SEB; 9	ALG; 8	**SPA**; 3	LMS; 2	MNZ; 7	FUJ; 13	BHR; NC		5th	65
2024	Team WRT	LMGT3	BMW M4 GT3	BMW P58 3.0 L Turbo I6	QAT; 4	IMO; 2	SPA; Ret	LMS; Ret	SÃO; 5	COA; NC	FUJ; 3	BHR; 14	6th	61
2025	Team WRT	LMGT3	BMW M4 GT3 Evo	BMW P58 3.0 L Turbo I6	QAT; 11	**IMO**; 2	SPA; 9	LMS; Ret	SÃO; 10	COA; 2	FUJ; 4	BHR; 15	8th	52

=== Complete 24 Hours of Le Mans results ===
Year	Team	Co-Drivers	Car	Class	Laps	Pos.	Class Pos.
2023	(Oman) ORT by TF	(United States) Michael Dinan (Republic of Ireland) Charlie Eastwood	Aston Martin Vantage AMR	GTE; Am	312	28th	**2nd**
2024	(Belgium) Team WRT	(Belgium) Maxime Martin (Italy) Valentino Rossi	BMW M4 GT3	LMGT3	109	DNF	DNF
2025	(Belgium) Team WRT	(Italy) Valentino Rossi (South Africa) Kelvin van der Linde	BMW M4 GT3 Evo	LMGT3	156	DNF	DNF

Sporting positions
Preceded by Alessandro Bonacini; Michał Broniszewski; Andrea Rizzoli	Blancpain GT Series Endurance Cup; Pro-Am Champion; 2017; With: Jonathan Adam	Succeeded by Lewis Williamson; Nick Leventis; Chris Buncombe
Preceded by Lewis Williamson; Nick Leventis; Chris Buncombe	Blancpain GT Series Endurance Cup; Pro-Am Champion; 2019; With: Charlie Eastwood & Salih Yoluç	Succeeded by Chris Goodwin; Alexander West (GT World Challenge Europe Endurance Cup)
