= 6 Hours of Abu Dhabi =

Sports car endurance race in United Arab Emirates

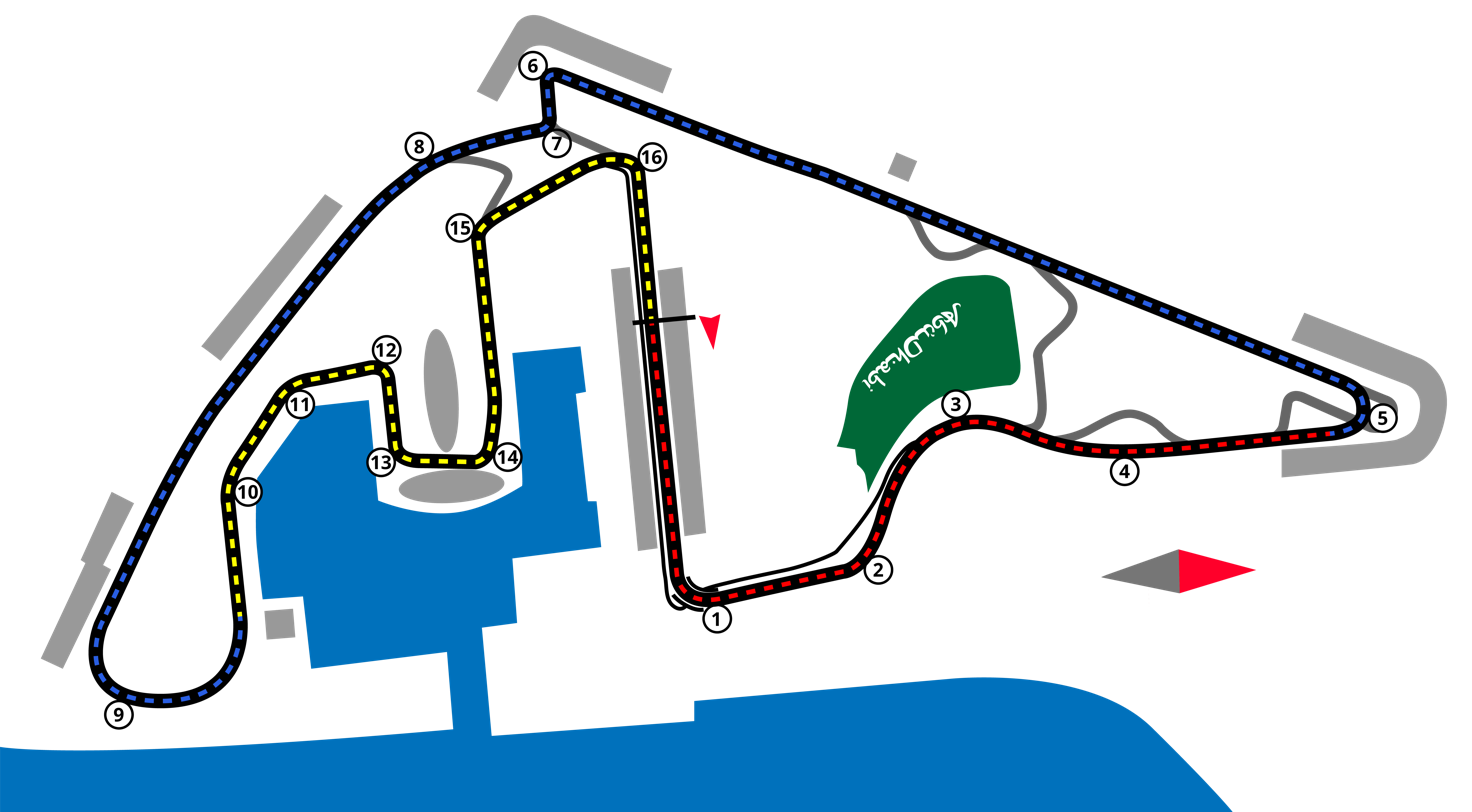

Middle East Trophy
- Venue: Yas Marina Circuit
- First race: 2021
- First MET race: 2023
- Last race: 2026
- Duration: 6 hours
- Most wins (driver): (Hong Kong) Antares Au (Netherlands) Loek Hartog (2)
- Most wins (team): (Germany) Car Collection Motorsport (2)
- Most wins (manufacturer): Porsche (3)

The 6 Hours of Abu Dhabi is an endurance race for sports cars held at Yas Marina Circuit in Yas Island, Abu Dhabi, United Arab Emirates.

== Results ==
Year	Overall winner(s)	Entrant	Car	Duration	Race title	Championship	Report	Ref
2021	(Hong Kong) Antares Au (United Kingdom) Chris Froggatt (United Kingdom) Ian Loggie	(Germany) Car Collection Motorsport	Audi R8 LMS Evo	6:00:22.936	Hankook 6 Hours of Abu Dhabi	Non-championship	report	
2022	(Austria) Philipp Baron (Zimbabwe) Axcil Jefferies (Austria) Ernst Kirchmayr (Denmark) Mikkel Mac (Poland) Roman Ziermian	(Austria) Baron Motorsport	Ferrari 488 GT3 Evo 2020	6:04:16.725	Hankook 6 Hours of Abu Dhabi	Non-championship	report	
2023	(United Kingdom) Harry King (United Kingdom) Alex Malykhin (Germany) Joel Sturm	(Lithuania) Pure Rxcing	Porsche 911 GT3 R	6:00:34.723	Hankook 6 Hours of Abu Dhabi	Middle East Trophy	report	
2024	(United States) Dustin Blattner (Netherlands) Loek Hartog (Germany) Dennis Marschall	(Germany) Car Collection Motorsport	Porsche 911 GT3 R (992)	6:00:29.851	Hankook 6 Hours of Abu Dhabi	Middle East Trophy	report	
2025	Timur Boguslavskiy (Australia) Yasser Shahin (Belgium) Charles Weerts	(Belgium) The Bend Team WRT	BMW M4 GT3 Evo	6:01:39.284	Michelin 6 Hours of Abu Dhabi	Middle East Trophy	report	
2026	(Hong Kong) Antares Au (Netherlands) Loek Hartog (Netherlands) Huub van Eijndhoven	(Germany) Herberth Motorsport	Porsche 911 GT3 R (992)	6:02:13.200	Michelin 6 Hours of Abu Dhabi	24H Series Middle East	report	

=== Records ===
==== Wins by constructor ====
Rank	Constructor	Wins	Years
1	(Germany) Porsche	3	2023–2024, 2026
2	(Germany) Audi	1	2021
2	(Italy) Ferrari	1	2022
2	(Germany) BMW	1	2025
