= 2023 4 Hours of Sepang =

Endurance sportscar racing event

The layout of the Sepang International Circuit

The 2023 4 Hours of Sepang was an endurance sportscar racing event held between 1 and 3 December 2023 at Sepang International Circuit in Sepang, Malaysia. It was the first and second round of 2023–24 Asian Le Mans Series season.

== Schedule ==
Date	Time (local: MST)	Event
Friday, 1 December	13:30	Free Practice 1
Friday, 1 December	16:00	Free Practice 2
Saturday, 2 December	9:50	Qualifying
Saturday, 2 December	14:00	Race 1
Sunday, 3 December	14:00	Race 2

== Entry list ==
The entry list was published on 22 November and consisted of 39 entries in 3 categories – 11 in LMP2, 5 in LMP3 and 23 in GT.

== Free practice ==
- Only the fastest car in each class is shown.

Free Practice 1	Class	No.	Entrant	Time
Free Practice 1	LMP2	4	(Portugal) CrowdStrike Racing by APR	1:54.101
Free Practice 1	LMP3	2	(Spain) CD Sport	2:00.930
Free Practice 1	GT	21	(Italy) AF Corse	2:04.476
Free Practice 2	Class	No.	Entrant	Time
Free Practice 2	LMP2	83	(Italy) AF Corse	1:54.046
Free Practice 2	LMP3	2	(Spain) CD Sport	2:00.235
Free Practice 2	GT	7	(Oman) Al Manar Racing by GetSpeed	2:04.901

== Race 1 ==
=== Qualifying ===
Pole position winners in each class are marked in bold.

Pos	Class	No.	Team	Driver	Time	Gap	Grid
1	**LMP2**	**90**	**(United Kingdom) TF Sport**	**(Turkey) Salih Yoluç**	**1:53.653**	—	1
2	LMP2	30	(France) Duqueine Team	(United States) John Falb	1:54.064	+0.411	2
3	LMP2	22	(Germany) Proton Competition	(Italy) Giorgio Roda	1:54.064	+0.411	3
4	LMP2	99	(Jordan) 99 Racing	(Oman) Ahmad Al Harthy	1:54.071	+0.418	4
5	LMP2	3	(Luxembourg) DKR Engineering	(Germany) Alexander Mattschull	1:54.286	+0.633	5
6	LMP2	55	(Germany) Proton Competition	(United States) P. J. Hyett	1:54.437	+0.784	6
7	LMP2	4	(Portugal) CrowdStrike Racing by APR	(United States) George Kurtz	1:54.512	+0.859	7
8	LMP2	83	(Italy) AF Corse	(France) François Perrodo	1:55.355	+1.702	8
9	LMP2	25	(Portugal) Algarve Pro Racing	(United States) Chris McMurry	1:55.411	+1.758	9
10	LMP2	24	(United Kingdom) Nielsen Racing	(United Kingdom) Ian Loggie	1:56.602	+2.949	10
11	LMP2	44	(Slovakia) ARC Bratislava	(Slovakia) Miro Konôpka	1:57.105	+3.452	11
12	**LMP3**	**20**	**(Denmark) High Class Racing**	**(Iceland) Auðunn Guðmundsson**	**2:00.430**	**+6.777**	12
13	LMP3	17	(Switzerland) Cool Racing	(Saint Kitts and Nevis) Alexander Bukhantsov	2:01.054	+7.401	13
14	LMP3	26	(Czech Republic) Bretton Racing	(Algeria) Julien Gerbi	2:01.546	+7.893	14
15	LMP3	2	(Spain) CD Sport	(United Kingdom) Nick Adcock	2:01.663	+8.010	15
16	**GT**	**42**	**(France) Saintéloc Racing**	**(France) Alban Varutti**	**2:03.998**	**+10.345**	16
17	LMP3	65	(Malaysia) Viper Niza Racing	(Malaysia) Douglas Khoo	2:04.170	+10.517	17
18	GT	37	(Hong Kong) Craft-Bamboo Racing	(China) Anthony Liu	2:04.373	+10.720	18
19	GT	9	(Germany) GetSpeed	(Luxembourg) Steve Jans	2:04.488	+10.835	19
20	GT	7	(Oman) Al Manar Racing by GetSpeed	(Austria) Martin Konrad	2:04.669	+11.016	20
21	GT	43	(France) Saintéloc Racing	(China) Zhou Bihuang	2:05.230	+11.577	21
22	GT	33	(Germany) Herberth Motorsport	(Hong Kong) Antares Au	2:05.257	+11.604	22
23	GT	91	(Lithuania) Pure Rxcing	(Saint Kitts and Nevis) Alex Malykhin	2:05.272	+11.619	23
24	GT	88	(Australia) Triple Eight	(Malaysia) Prince Jefri Ibrahim	2:05.427	+11.774	24
25	GT	66	(Germany) Attempto Racing	Andrey Mukovoz	2:05.492	+11.839	25
26	GT	27	(United Kingdom) Optimum Motorsport	(United Kingdom) Mark Radcliffe	2:05.759	+12.106	26
27	GT	69	(United Kingdom) Optimum Motorsport	(United Kingdom) James Cottingham	2:05.849	+12.196	27
28	GT	93	(Germany) Team Project 1	(United Kingdom) Darren Leung	2:05.947	+12.294	28
29	GT	11	(Germany) Attempto Racing	(Canada) Ilya Gorbatsky	2:06.304	+12.651	29
30	GT	19	(Germany) Leipert Motorsport	(Italy) Gabriel Rindone	2:06.359	+12.706	30
31	GT	77	(Japan) D'Station Racing	(Japan) Satoshi Hoshino	2:06.412	+12.759	31
32	GT	8	(New Zealand) EBM	(Indonesia) Setiawan Santoso	2:06.786	+13.133	32
33	GT	86	(United Kingdom) GR Racing	(United Kingdom) Michael Wainwright	2:06.822	+13.169	33
34	GT	56	(Germany) Team Project 1	(China) Huilin Han	2:07.072	+13.419	34
35	GT	21	(Italy) AF Corse	(France) François Heriau	2:07.127	+13.474	35
36	GT	95	(United Kingdom) TF Sport	(United Kingdom) John Hartshorne	2:08.307	+14.654	36
37	GT	84	(New Zealand) EBM	(Malaysia) Adrian D'Silva	2:09.094	+15.441	37
38	GT	75	(Germany) Team Motopark	—			38
39	GT	82	(Italy) AF Corse	—			39

=== Race ===
==== Race result ====
The minimum number of laps for classification (70% of overall winning car's distance) was 70 laps. Class winners are marked in bold.

Final Classification
Pos	Class	No.	Team	Drivers	Car	Tyres	Laps	Time/Gap
1	**LMP2**	**99**	**(Jordan) 99 Racing**	**(Oman) Ahmad Al Harthy; Nikita Mazepin (Switzerland) Louis Delétraz**	**Oreca 07**	MI	**100**	**3:43:26.017**
2	LMP2	83	(Italy) AF Corse	(France) François Perrodo (France) Matthieu Vaxivière (Italy) Alessio Rovera	Oreca 07	MI	100	+10.537
3	LMP2	3	(Luxembourg) DKR Engineering	(Germany) Alexander Mattschull (France) Tom Dillmann (Germany) Laurents Hörr	Oreca 07	MI	100	+18.532
4	LMP2	55	(Germany) Proton Competition	(United States) P. J. Hyett (United Kingdom) Harry Tincknell (France) Paul-Loup Chatin	Oreca 07	MI	100	+51.654
5	LMP2	22	(Germany) Proton Competition	(Italy) Giorgio Roda (France) Julien Andlauer (Austria) René Binder	Oreca 07	MI	100	+58.693
6	LMP2	4	(Portugal) CrowdStrike Racing by APR	(United States) George Kurtz (United States) Colin Braun (Denmark) Malthe Jakobsen	Oreca 07	MI	100	+2:07.374
7	LMP2	90	(United Kingdom) TF Sport	(Turkey) Salih Yoluç (United States) Michael Dinan (Republic of Ireland) Charlie Eastwood	Oreca 07	MI	100	+5:47.122
8	LMP2	25	(Portugal) Algarve Pro Racing	(United States) Chris McMurry (United Kingdom) Freddie Tomlinson (United Kingdom) Toby Sowery	Oreca 07	MI	100	+6:08.950
9	LMP2	24	(United Kingdom) Nielsen Racing	(United Kingdom) Ian Loggie (Mexico) Alejandro García (Austria) Ferdinand Habsburg	Oreca 07	MI	99	+1 Lap
10	LMP2	44	(Slovakia) ARC Bratislava	(Slovakia) Miro Konôpka (Switzerland) Mathias Beche (Germany) Jonas Ried	Oreca 07	MI	99	+1 Lap
11	LMP2	30	(France) Duqueine Team	(United States) John Falb (Thailand) Carl Bennett (Denmark) Oliver Rasmussen	Oreca 07	MI	98	+2 Laps
12	**LMP3**	**17**	**(Switzerland) Cool Racing**	**(United Kingdom) James Winslow (Saint Kitts and Nevis) Alexander Bukhantsov (Singapore) Danial Frost**	**Ligier JS P320**	MI	**96**	**+4 Laps**
13	LMP3	2	(Spain) CD Sport	(Denmark) Michael Jensen (United Kingdom) Nick Adcock (France) Fabien Lavergne	Ligier JS P320	MI	96	+4 Laps
14	LMP3	26	(Czech Republic) Bretton Racing	(Czech Republic) Dan Skočdopole (Algeria) Julien Gerbi (Romania) Mihnea Stefan	Ligier JS P320	MI	96	+4 Laps
15	LMP3	20	(Denmark) High Class Racing	(Iceland) Auðunn Guðmundsson (Denmark) Anders Fjordbach (United States) Seth Lucas	Ligier JS P320	MI	95	+5 Laps
16	**GT**	**42**	**(France) Saintéloc Racing**	**(Germany) Christopher Haase (Belgium) Gilles Magnus (France) Alban Varutti**	**Audi R8 LMS Evo II**	MI	**94**	**+6 Laps**
17	GT	66	(Germany) Attempto Racing	(Luxembourg) Dylan Pereira (Germany) Alex Aka; Andrey Mukovoz	Audi R8 LMS Evo II	MI	94	+6 Laps
18	GT	43	(France) Saintéloc Racing	(Germany) Dennis Marschall (France) Paul Evrard (China) Zhou Bihuang	Audi R8 LMS Evo II	MI	94	+6 Laps
19	GT	7	(Oman) Al Manar Racing by GetSpeed	(Oman) Al Faisal Al Zubair (Austria) Martin Konrad (Germany) Fabian Schiller	Mercedes-AMG GT3 Evo	MI	94	+6 Laps
20	GT	19	(Germany) Leipert Motorsport	(Italy) Gabriel Rindone (New Zealand) Brendon Leitch (Italy) Marco Mapelli	Lamborghini Huracán GT3 Evo 2	MI	94	+6 Laps
21	GT	91	(Lithuania) Pure Rxcing	(Saint Kitts and Nevis) Alex Malykhin (Austria) Klaus Bachler (Germany) Joel Sturm	Porsche 911 GT3 R (992)	MI	94	+6 Laps
22	GT	88	(Australia) Triple Eight	(Malaysia) Prince Jefri Ibrahim (Australia) Broc Feeney (Germany) Luca Stolz	Mercedes-AMG GT3 Evo	MI	94	+6 Laps
23	GT	9	(Germany) GetSpeed	(United States) Anthony Bartone (United Kingdom) Aaron Walker (Luxembourg) Steve Jans	Mercedes-AMG GT3 Evo	MI	93	+7 Laps
24	GT	86	(United Kingdom) GR Racing	(United Kingdom) Michael Wainwright (United Kingdom) Benjamin Barker (Italy) Riccardo Pera	Ferrari 296 GT3	MI	93	+7 Laps
25	GT	21	(Italy) AF Corse	(United States) Simon Mann (France) François Heriau (Italy) Davide Rigon	Ferrari 296 GT3	MI	93	+7 Laps
26	GT	8	(New Zealand) EBM	(Indonesia) Setiawan Santoso (Thailand) Tanart Sathienthirakul (Denmark) Bastian Buus	Porsche 911 GT3 R (992)	MI	93	+7 Laps
27	GT	84	(New Zealand) EBM	(Malaysia) Adrian D'Silva (China) Kerong Li (New Zealand) Earl Bamber	Porsche 911 GT3 R (992)	MI	93	+7 Laps
28	GT	69	(United Kingdom) Optimum Motorsport	(United Kingdom) Sam De Haan (United Kingdom) James Cottingham (United Kingdom) Tom Gamble	McLaren 720S GT3 Evo	MI	93	+7 Laps
29	GT	11	(Germany) Attempto Racing	Alexey Nesov; Sergey Titarenko (Canada) Ilya Gorbatsky	Audi R8 LMS Evo II	MI	93	+7 Laps
30	GT	95	(United Kingdom) TF Sport	(United Kingdom) John Hartshorne (United Kingdom) Ben Tuck (United Kingdom) Jonathan Adam	Aston Martin Vantage AMR GT3	MI	93	+7 Laps
31	GT	77	(Japan) D'Station Racing	(Japan) Satoshi Hoshino (Japan) Tomonobu Fujii (United Kingdom) Casper Stevenson	Aston Martin Vantage AMR GT3	MI	93	+7 Laps
32	GT	27	(United Kingdom) Optimum Motorsport	(United Kingdom) Mark Radcliffe (United Kingdom) Rob Bell (United Kingdom) Ollie Millroy	McLaren 720S GT3 Evo	MI	93	+7 Laps
33	GT	93	(Germany) Team Project 1	(United Kingdom) Darren Leung (United States) Christian Bogle (United Kingdom) Dan Harper	BMW M4 GT3	MI	89	+11 Laps
34	GT	75	(Germany) Team Motopark	(Austria) Lukas Dunner (Germany) Heiko Neumann (Denmark) Morten Strømsted	Mercedes-AMG GT3 Evo	MI	89	+11 Laps
35	GT	56	(Germany) Team Project 1	(Indonesia) Sean Gelael (Netherlands) Maxime Oosten (China) Huilin Han	BMW M4 GT3	MI	87	+13 Laps
36	GT	82	(Italy) AF Corse	(France) Charles-Henri Samani (France) Emmanuel Collard (Japan) Kei Cozzolino	Ferrari 296 GT3	MI	87	+13 Laps
Not classified
	LMP3	65	(Malaysia) Viper Niza Racing	(Malaysia) Douglas Khoo (Malaysia) Dominic Ang (Australia) Joshua Burdon	Ligier JS P320	MI	80	
	GT	33	(Germany) Herberth Motorsport	(Hong Kong) Antares Au (Germany) Tim Heinemann (Italy) Matteo Cairoli	Porsche 911 GT3 R (992)	MI	72	
	GT	37	(Hong Kong) Craft-Bamboo Racing	(China) Anthony Liu (Andorra) Jules Gounon (Australia) Jayden Ojeda	Mercedes-AMG GT3 Evo	MI	1	

==== Statistics ====
===== Fastest lap =====
Class	Driver	Team	Time	Lap
LMP2	(Switzerland) Louis Delétraz	(Jordan) #99 99 Racing	1:52.991	83
LMP3	(France) Fabien Lavergne	(Spain) #2 CD Sport	2:01.695	29
GT	(Germany) Joel Sturm	(Lithuania) #91 Pure Rxcing	2:05.507	33

== Race 2 ==
=== Qualifying ===
One Qualifying session was held. Each crew's second fastest lap was used to determine the grid for the Race 2. Pole position winners in each class are marked in bold.

Pos	Class	No.	Team	Driver	Time	Gap	Grid
1	**LMP2**	**90**	**(United Kingdom) TF Sport**	**(Turkey) Salih Yoluç**	**1:53.874**	—	1
2	LMP2	30	(France) Duqueine Team	(United States) John Falb	1:54.233	+0.359	2
3	LMP2	3	(Luxembourg) DKR Engineering	(Germany) Alexander Mattschull	1:54.331	+0.457	3
4	LMP2	22	(Germany) Proton Competition	(Italy) Giorgio Roda	1:54.750	+0.876	4
5	LMP2	99	(Jordan) 99 Racing	(Oman) Ahmad Al Harthy	1:54.926	+1.052	5
6	LMP2	4	(Portugal) CrowdStrike Racing by APR	(United States) George Kurtz	1:54.988	+1.114	6
7	LMP2	55	(Germany) Proton Competition	(United States) P. J. Hyett	1:55.159	+1.285	7
8	LMP2	83	(Italy) AF Corse	(France) François Perrodo	1:55.381	+1.507	8
9	LMP2	25	(Portugal) Algarve Pro Racing	[[Chris McMurry| (United States) ]] Chris McMurry	1:55.467	+1.593	9
10	LMP2	24	(United Kingdom) Nielsen Racing	(United Kingdom) Ian Loggie	1:56.719	+2.845	10
11	LMP2	44	(Slovakia) ARC Bratislava	(Slovakia) Miro Konôpka	1:57.410	+3.536	11
12	**LMP3**	**20**	**(Denmark) High Class Racing**	**(Iceland) Auðunn Guðmundsson**	**2:00.756**	**+6.882**	12
13	LMP3	17	(Switzerland) Cool Racing	(Saint Kitts and Nevis) Alexander Bukhantsov	2:01.200	+7.326	13
14	LMP3	26	(Czech Republic) Bretton Racing	(Algeria) Julien Gerbi	2:01.629	+7.755	14
15	LMP3	2	(Spain) CD Sport	(United Kingdom) Nick Adcock	2:01.776	+7.902	15
16	**GT**	**37**	**(Hong Kong) Craft-Bamboo Racing**	**(China) Anthony Liu**	**2:04.538**	**+10.664**	16
17	LMP3	65	(Malaysia) Viper Niza Racing	(Malaysia) Douglas Khoo	2:04.655	+10.781	17
18	GT	7	(Oman) Al Manar Racing by GetSpeed	(Austria) Martin Konrad	2:04.889	+11.015	18
19	GT	42	(France) Saintéloc Racing	(France) Alban Varutti	2:04.970	+11.096	19
20	GT	9	(Germany) GetSpeed	(Luxembourg) Steve Jans	2:05.307	+11.433	20
21	GT	33	(Germany) Herberth Motorsport	(Hong Kong) Antares Au	2:05.321	+11.447	21
22	GT	91	(Lithuania) Pure Rxcing	(Saint Kitts and Nevis) Alex Malykhin	2:05.447	+11.573	22
23	GT	66	(Germany) Attempto Racing	Andrey Mukovoz	2:05.507	+11.633	23
24	GT	93	(Germany) Team Project 1	(United Kingdom) Darren Leung	2:06.600	+12.726	24
25	GT	69	(United Kingdom) Optimum Motorsport	(United Kingdom) James Cottingham	2:06.698	+12.824	25
26	GT	11	(Germany) Attempto Racing	(Canada) Ilya Gorbatsky	2:06.749	+12.875	26
27	GT	88	(Australia) Triple Eight	(Malaysia) Prince Jefri Ibrahim	2:06.796	+12.922	27
28	GT	43	(France) Saintéloc Racing	(China) Zhou Bihuang	2:06.816	+12.942	28
29	GT	27	(United Kingdom) Optimum Motorsport	(United Kingdom) Mark Radcliffe	2:07.165	+13.291	29
30	GT	8	(New Zealand) EBM	(Indonesia) Setiawan Santoso	2:07.174	+13.300	30
31	GT	86	(United Kingdom) GR Racing	(United Kingdom) Michael Wainwright	2:07.181	+13.307	31
32	GT	19	(Germany) Leipert Motorsport	(Italy) Gabriel Rindone	2:07.331	+13.457	32
33	GT	56	(Germany) Team Project 1	(China) Huilin Han	2:07.952	+14.078	33
34	GT	21	(Italy) AF Corse	(France) François Heriau	2:08.081	+14.207	34
35	GT	77	(Japan) D'Station Racing	(Japan) Satoshi Hoshino	2:15.746	+21.872	35
36	GT	95	(United Kingdom) TF Sport	(United Kingdom) John Hartshorne	2:19.125	+25.251	36
37	GT	75	(Germany) Team Motopark	—			37
38	GT	82	(Italy) AF Corse	—			38
39	GT	84	(New Zealand) EBM	—			39

=== Race ===
==== Race result ====
The minimum number of laps for classification (70% of overall winning car's distance) was 75 laps. Class winners are marked in bold.

Final Classification
Pos	Class	No.	Team	Drivers	Car	Tyres	Laps	Time/Gap
1	**LMP2**	**4**	**(Portugal) CrowdStrike Racing by APR**	**(United States) George Kurtz (United States) Colin Braun (Denmark) Malthe Jakobsen**	**Oreca 07**	MI	**108**	**4:00:38.800**
2	LMP2	99	(Jordan) 99 Racing	(Oman) Ahmad Al Harthy; Nikita Mazepin (Switzerland) Louis Delétraz	Oreca 07	MI	108	+8.927
3	LMP2	22	(Germany) Proton Competition	(Italy) Giorgio Roda (France) Julien Andlauer (Austria) René Binder	Oreca 07	MI	108	+9.342
4	LMP2	83	(Italy) AF Corse	(France) François Perrodo (France) Matthieu Vaxivière (Italy) Alessio Rovera	Oreca 07	MI	108	+15.742
5	LMP2	55	(Germany) Proton Competition	(United States) P. J. Hyett (United Kingdom) Harry Tincknell (France) Paul-Loup Chatin	Oreca 07	MI	108	+26.680
6	LMP2	3	(Luxembourg) DKR Engineering	(Germany) Alexander Mattschull (France) Tom Dillmann (Germany) Laurents Hörr	Oreca 07	MI	108	+27.338
7	LMP2	30	(France) Duqueine Team	(United States) John Falb (Thailand) Carl Bennett (Denmark) Oliver Rasmussen	Oreca 07	MI	108	+27.844
8	LMP2	90	(United Kingdom) TF Sport	(Turkey) Salih Yoluç (United States) Michael Dinan (Republic of Ireland) Charlie Eastwood	Oreca 07	MI	107	+1 Lap
9	LMP2	25	(Portugal) Algarve Pro Racing	(United States) Chris McMurry (United Kingdom) Freddie Tomlinson (United Kingdom) Toby Sowery	Oreca 07	MI	107	+1 Lap
10	LMP2	44	(Slovakia) ARC Bratislava	(Slovakia) Miro Konôpka (Switzerland) Mathias Beche (Germany) Jonas Ried	Oreca 07	MI	107	+1 Lap
11	**LMP3**	**2**	**(Spain) CD Sport**	**(Denmark) Michael Jensen (United Kingdom) Nick Adcock (France) Fabien Lavergne**	**Ligier JS P320**	MI	**105**	**+3 Laps**
12	LMP3	26	(Czech Republic) Bretton Racing	(Czech Republic) Dan Skočdopole (Algeria) Julien Gerbi (Romania) Mihnea Stefan	Ligier JS P320	MI	104	+4 Laps
13	LMP3	17	(Switzerland) Cool Racing	(United Kingdom) James Winslow (Saint Kitts and Nevis) Alexander Bukhantsov (Singapore) Danial Frost	Ligier JS P320	MI	104	+4 Laps
14	**GT**	**91**	**(Lithuania) Pure Rxcing**	**(Saint Kitts and Nevis) Alex Malykhin (Austria) Klaus Bachler (Germany) Joel Sturm**	**Porsche 911 GT3 R (992)**	MI	**101**	**+7 Laps**
15	GT	42	(France) Saintéloc Racing	(Germany) Christopher Haase (Belgium) Gilles Magnus (France) Alban Varutti	Audi R8 LMS Evo II	MI	101	+7 Laps
16	GT	27	(United Kingdom) Optimum Motorsport	(United Kingdom) Mark Radcliffe (United Kingdom) Rob Bell (United Kingdom) Ollie Millroy	McLaren 720S GT3 Evo	MI	101	+7 Laps
17	GT	7	(Oman) Al Manar Racing by GetSpeed	(Oman) Al Faisal Al Zubair (Austria) Martin Konrad (Germany) Fabian Schiller	Mercedes-AMG GT3 Evo	MI	101	+7 Laps
18	GT	69	(United Kingdom) Optimum Motorsport	(United Kingdom) Sam De Haan (United Kingdom) James Cottingham (United Kingdom) Tom Gamble	McLaren 720S GT3 Evo	MI	101	+7 Laps
19	GT	88	(Australia) Triple Eight	(Malaysia) Prince Jefri Ibrahim (Australia) Broc Feeney (Germany) Luca Stolz	Mercedes-AMG GT3 Evo	MI	101	+7 Laps
20	GT	33	(Germany) Herberth Motorsport	(Hong Kong) Antares Au (Germany) Tim Heinemann (Italy) Matteo Cairoli	Porsche 911 GT3 R (992)	MI	101	+7 Laps
21	GT	37	(Hong Kong) Craft-Bamboo Racing	(China) Anthony Liu (Andorra) Jules Gounon (Australia) Jayden Ojeda	Mercedes-AMG GT3 Evo	MI	101	+7 Laps
22	GT	95	(United Kingdom) TF Sport	(United Kingdom) John Hartshorne [[Ben Tuck| (United Kingdom) ]] Ben Tuck (United Kingdom) Jonathan Adam	Aston Martin Vantage AMR GT3	MI	101	+7 Laps
23	GT	93	(Germany) Team Project 1	[[Darren Leung| (United Kingdom) ]] Darren Leung (United States) Christian Bogle (United Kingdom) Dan Harper	BMW M4 GT3	MI	101	+7 Laps
24	GT	86	(United Kingdom) GR Racing	(United Kingdom) Michael Wainwright (United Kingdom) Benjamin Barker (Italy) Riccardo Pera	Ferrari 296 GT3	MI	101	+7 Laps
25	GT	82	(Italy) AF Corse	(France) Charles-Henri Samani (France) Emmanuel Collard (Japan) Kei Cozzolino	Ferrari 296 GT3	MI	101	+7 Laps
26	GT	43	(France) Saintéloc Racing	(Germany) Dennis Marschall (France) Paul Evrard (China) Zhou Bihuang	Audi R8 LMS Evo II	MI	100	+8 Laps
27	GT	84	(New Zealand) EBM	(Malaysia) Adrian D'Silva (China) Kerong Li (New Zealand) Earl Bamber	Porsche 911 GT3 R (992)	MI	100	+8 Laps
28	GT	11	(Germany) Attempto Racing	Alexey Nesov; Sergey Titarenko (Canada) Ilya Gorbatsky	Audi R8 LMS Evo II	MI	100	+8 Laps
29	GT	75	(Germany) Team Motopark	(Austria) Lukas Dunner (Germany) Heiko Neumann (Denmark) Morten Strømsted	Mercedes-AMG GT3 Evo	MI	100	+8 Laps
30	GT	77	(Japan) D'Station Racing	(Japan) Satoshi Hoshino (Japan) Tomonobu Fujii (United Kingdom) Casper Stevenson	Aston Martin Vantage AMR GT3	MI	100	+8 Laps
31	GT	56	(Germany) Team Project 1	(Indonesia) Sean Gelael (Netherlands) Maxime Oosten (China) Huilin Han	BMW M4 GT3	MI	100	+8 Laps
Not classified
	LMP2	24	(United Kingdom) Nielsen Racing	(United Kingdom) Ian Loggie (Mexico) Alejandro García (Austria) Ferdinand Habsburg	Oreca 07	MI	105	
	LMP3	65	(Malaysia) Viper Niza Racing	(Malaysia) Douglas Khoo (Malaysia) Dominic Ang (Australia) Joshua Burdon	Ligier JS P320	MI	79	
	GT	19	(Germany) Leipert Motorsport	(Italy) Gabriel Rindone (New Zealand) Brendon Leitch (Italy) Marco Mapelli	Lamborghini Huracán GT3 Evo 2	MI	73	
	LMP3	20	(Denmark) High Class Racing	(Iceland) Auðunn Guðmundsson (Denmark) Anders Fjordbach (United States) Seth Lucas	Ligier JS P320	MI	70	
	GT	9	(Germany) GetSpeed	(United States) Anthony Bartone (United Kingdom) Aaron Walker (Luxembourg) Steve Jans	Mercedes-AMG GT3 Evo	MI	50	
	GT	8	(New Zealand) EBM	(Indonesia) Setiawan Santoso (Thailand) Tanart Sathienthirakul (Denmark) Bastian Buus	Porsche 911 GT3 R (992)	MI	27	
	GT	21	(Italy) AF Corse	(United States) Simon Mann (France) François Heriau (Italy) Davide Rigon	Ferrari 296 GT3	MI	26	
	GT	66	(Germany) Attempto Racing	(Luxembourg) Dylan Pereira (Germany) Alex Aka; Andrey Mukovoz	Audi R8 LMS Evo II	MI	24	

==== Statistics ====
===== Fastest lap =====
Class	Driver	Team	Time	Lap
LMP2	(France) Matthieu Vaxivière	(Italy) #83 AF Corse	1:53.009	87
LMP3	(Australia) Joshua Burdon	(Malaysia) #65 Viper Niza Racing	2:01.837	77
GT	[[Ben Tuck| (United Kingdom) ]] Ben Tuck	(United Kingdom) #95 TF Sport	2:04.999	94
