= 2023 6 Hours of Abu Dhabi =

Endurance automotive competition

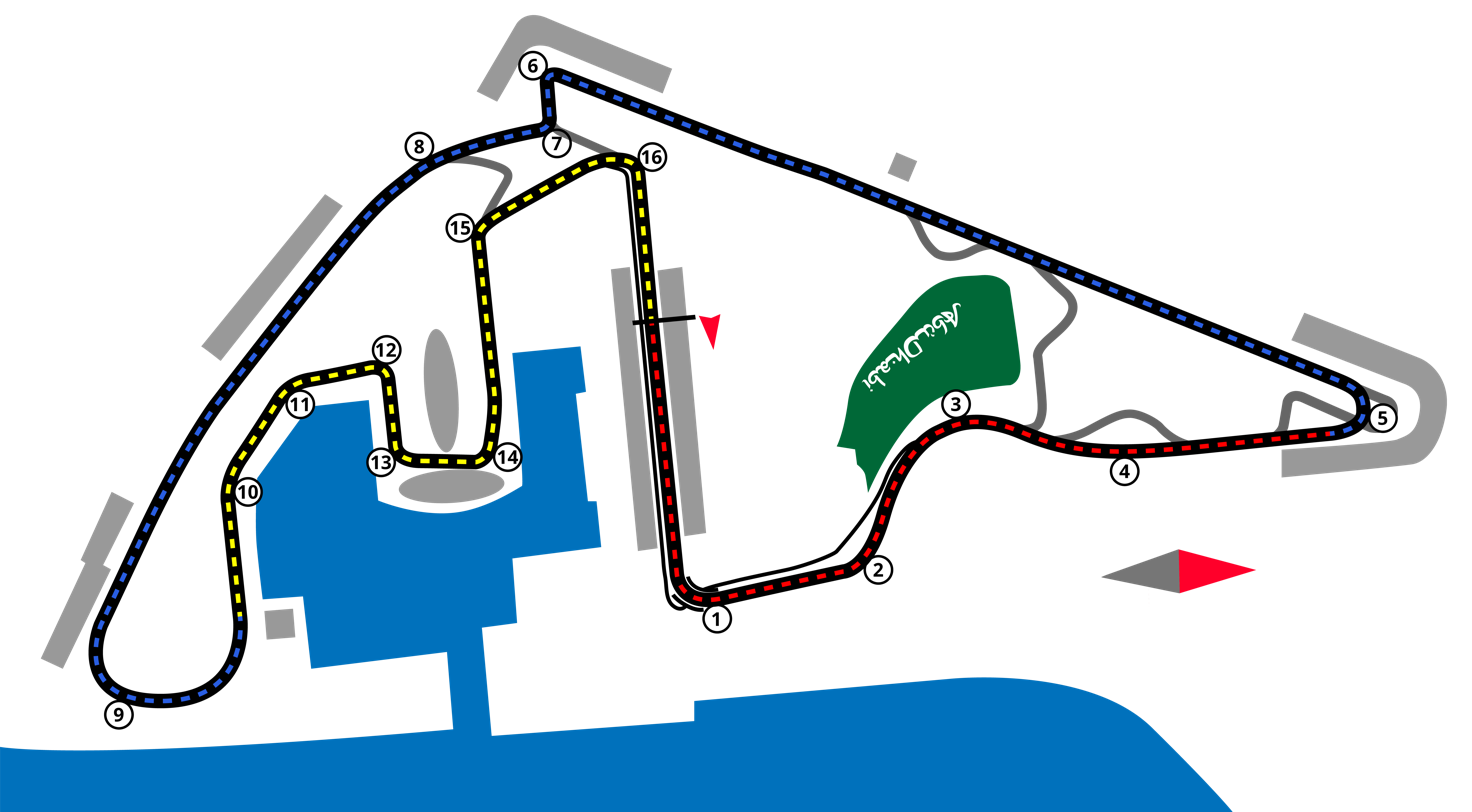
Yas Marina Circuit, Abu Dubai

The 2023 6 Hours of Abu Dhabi (formally known as the Hankook 6 Hours Abu Dhabi), was the third running of the 6 Hours of Abu Dhabi, an endurance race that took place at the Yas Marina Circuit on 21 January 2023. This race was the third and final round of the 2022–23 Middle East Trophy.

== Schedule ==
Date	Time (local: GST)	Event	Duration
21 January	9:00 - 11:30	Free Practice	90 Minutes
21 January	13:00 - 13:55	Qualifying	3x15 Minutes
21 January	16:00 - 22:00	Race	6 Hours

== Entry list ==
Team	Car	Engine	No.	Drivers	Class
GT3 (6 entries)
(Germany) Phoenix Racing	Audi R8 LMS Evo II	Audi DAR 5.2 L V10	1	(Austria) Michael Doppelmayr	PA
(Germany) Phoenix Racing	Audi R8 LMS Evo II	Audi DAR 5.2 L V10	1	(Germany) Pierre Kaffer	PA
(Germany) Phoenix Racing	Audi R8 LMS Evo II	Audi DAR 5.2 L V10	1	(Germany) Elia Erhart	PA
(Germany) Phoenix Racing	Audi R8 LMS Evo II	Audi DAR 5.2 L V10	1	(Germany) Sven Herberger	PA
(Netherlands) JR Motorsport	BMW M6 GT3	BMW S63 4.4 L Turbo V8	12	(Netherlands) Ted van Vliet	P
(Netherlands) JR Motorsport	BMW M6 GT3	BMW S63 4.4 L Turbo V8	12	(Netherlands) Max Weering	P
(Antigua and Barbuda) HAAS RT	Audi R8 LMS Evo II	Audi DAR 5.2 L V10	21	(France) Stéphane Perrin	P
(Antigua and Barbuda) HAAS RT	Audi R8 LMS Evo II	Audi DAR 5.2 L V10	21	(Belgium) Mathieu Detry	P
(Antigua and Barbuda) HAAS RT	Audi R8 LMS Evo II	Audi DAR 5.2 L V10	21	(Belgium) Maxime Soulet	P
(Slovakia) ARC Bratislava	Lamborghini Huracán GT3	Lamborghini DGF 5.2 L V10	44	(Slovakia) Miro Konôpka	Am
(Slovakia) ARC Bratislava	Lamborghini Huracán GT3	Lamborghini DGF 5.2 L V10	44	(Poland) Andrzej Lewandowski	Am
(Germany) Herberth Motorsport	Porsche 911 GT3 R	Porsche 4.0 L Flat-6	91	(Germany) Felix Neuhofer	P
(Germany) Herberth Motorsport	Porsche 911 GT3 R	Porsche 4.0 L Flat-6	91	(Germany) Markus Neuhofer	P
(Germany) Herberth Motorsport	Porsche 911 GT3 R	Porsche 4.0 L Flat-6	91	(Germany) Alfred Renauer	P
(Germany) Herberth Motorsport	Porsche 911 GT3 R	Porsche 4.0 L Flat-6	91	(Germany) Robert Renauer	P
(Lithuania) Pure Rxcing	Porsche 911 GT3 R	Porsche 4.0 L Flat-6	911	(United Kingdom) Harry King	P
(Lithuania) Pure Rxcing	Porsche 911 GT3 R	Porsche 4.0 L Flat-6	911	(United Kingdom) Alex Malykhin (Note: Alex Malykhin is a Belarusian driver competing with a British license due to the FIA ban on the use of the Belarusian flag due to the Russian invasion of Ukraine.)	P
(Lithuania) Pure Rxcing	Porsche 911 GT3 R	Porsche 4.0 L Flat-6	911	(Germany) Joel Sturm	P
GTX (5 entries)
(France) Vortex V8	Vortex 1.0 GTX	Chevrolet LS3 6.2 L V8	701	(France) Lionel Amrouche	
(France) Vortex V8	Vortex 1.0 GTX	Chevrolet LS3 6.2 L V8	701	(France) Julien Boillot	
(France) Vortex V8	Vortex 1.0 GTX	Chevrolet LS3 6.2 L V8	701	(France) Philippe Bonnel	
(Germany) Leipert Motorsport	Lamborghini Huracán Super Trofeo Evo	Lamborghini DGF 5.2 L V10	710	(United States) Gregg Gorski	
(Germany) Leipert Motorsport	Lamborghini Huracán Super Trofeo Evo	Lamborghini DGF 5.2 L V10	710	(United States) Josh Hansen	
(Germany) Leipert Motorsport	Lamborghini Huracán Super Trofeo Evo	Lamborghini DGF 5.2 L V10	710	(Germany) Jürgen Krebs	
(Austria) razoon-more than racing	KTM X-Bow GT2 Concept	Audi TFSI 2.5 L I5	714	(Austria) Daniel Drexel	
(Austria) razoon-more than racing	KTM X-Bow GT2 Concept	Audi TFSI 2.5 L I5	714	(Austria) Dominik Olbert	
(Austria) razoon-more than racing	KTM X-Bow GT2 Concept	Audi TFSI 2.5 L I5	714	(Kuwait) Haytham Qarajouli	
(Austria) razoon-more than racing	KTM X-Bow GT2 Concept	Audi TFSI 2.5 L I5	714	(Austria) Laura Kraihamer	
(Portugal) P21 Motorsport	Porsche 991 GT3 II Cup	Porsche 4.0 L Flat-6	721	(United Kingdom) Chris Hillaby	
(Portugal) P21 Motorsport	Porsche 991 GT3 II Cup	Porsche 4.0 L Flat-6	721	(Portugal) José Monroy	
(Portugal) P21 Motorsport	Porsche 991 GT3 II Cup	Porsche 4.0 L Flat-6	721	(Portugal) Rui Miritta	
(Germany) Tischner Motorsport	Porsche 991 GT3 II Cup	Porsche 4.0 L Flat-6	763	(Germany) Uwe Kleen	
(Germany) Tischner Motorsport	Porsche 991 GT3 II Cup	Porsche 4.0 L Flat-6	763	(Germany) Matthias Tischner	
(Germany) Tischner Motorsport	Porsche 991 GT3 II Cup	Porsche 4.0 L Flat-6	763	(Germany) Michael Tischner	
992 (8 entries)
(Netherlands) Red Camel-Jordans.nl	Porsche 992 GT3 Cup	Porsche 4.0 L Flat-6	909	(Netherlands) Ivo Breukers	P
(Netherlands) Red Camel-Jordans.nl	Porsche 992 GT3 Cup	Porsche 4.0 L Flat-6	909	(Netherlands) Luc Breukers	P
(Netherlands) Red Camel-Jordans.nl	Porsche 992 GT3 Cup	Porsche 4.0 L Flat-6	909	(Netherlands) Rik Breukers	P
(Netherlands) Red Camel-Jordans.nl	Porsche 992 GT3 Cup	Porsche 4.0 L Flat-6	909	(Switzerland) Fabian Danz	P
(Germany) NKPP by HRT Performance	Porsche 992 GT3 Cup	Porsche 4.0 L Flat-6	928	(Finland) Miika Panu	Am
(Germany) NKPP by HRT Performance	Porsche 992 GT3 Cup	Porsche 4.0 L Flat-6	928	(Finland) Jim Rautiainen	Am
QMMF by HRT Thuraya Qatar	Porsche 992 GT3 Cup	Porsche 4.0 L Flat-6	929	(Germany) Julian Hanses	Am
QMMF by HRT Thuraya Qatar	Porsche 992 GT3 Cup	Porsche 4.0 L Flat-6	929	(Qatar) Abdulla Ali Al-Khelaifi	Am
QMMF by HRT Thuraya Qatar	Porsche 992 GT3 Cup	Porsche 4.0 L Flat-6	929	(Qatar) Ibrahim Al-Abdulghani	Am
QMMF by HRT Thuraya Qatar	Porsche 992 GT3 Cup	Porsche 4.0 L Flat-6	929	(Qatar) Ghanim Al Maadheed	Am
(Germany) HRT Performance	Porsche 992 GT3 Cup	Porsche 4.0 L Flat-6	930	(Finland) Antti Buri	P
(Germany) HRT Performance	Porsche 992 GT3 Cup	Porsche 4.0 L Flat-6	930	(Finland) Kari-Pekka Laaksonen	P
(Germany) HRT Performance	Porsche 992 GT3 Cup	Porsche 4.0 L Flat-6	931	(Germany) Fidel Leib	P
(Germany) HRT Performance	Porsche 992 GT3 Cup	Porsche 4.0 L Flat-6	931	(South Africa) Mikaeel Pitamber	P
(Romania) Willi Motorsport by Ebimotors	Porsche 992 GT3 Cup	Porsche 4.0 L Flat-6	955	(Italy) Fabrizio Broggi	P
(Romania) Willi Motorsport by Ebimotors	Porsche 992 GT3 Cup	Porsche 4.0 L Flat-6	955	(Italy) Sabino de Castro	P
(Romania) Willi Motorsport by Ebimotors	Porsche 992 GT3 Cup	Porsche 4.0 L Flat-6	955	(Romania) Sergiu Nicolae	P
(United Arab Emirates) RABDAN Motorsports	Porsche 992 GT3 Cup	Porsche 4.0 L Flat-6	977	(United Arab Emirates) Saif Al Ameri	P
(United Arab Emirates) RABDAN Motorsports	Porsche 992 GT3 Cup	Porsche 4.0 L Flat-6	977	(United Arab Emirates) Salem Al Ketbi	P
(United Arab Emirates) RABDAN Motorsports	Porsche 992 GT3 Cup	Porsche 4.0 L Flat-6	977	(United Arab Emirates) Helal Ali Mazrouei	P
(United Arab Emirates) RABDAN Motorsports	Porsche 992 GT3 Cup	Porsche 4.0 L Flat-6	977	(United Arab Emirates) Saeed Al Mehairi	P
(Belgium) Speed Lover	Porsche 992 GT3 Cup	Porsche 4.0 L Flat-6	979	(Belgium) Olivier Dons	Am
(Belgium) Speed Lover	Porsche 992 GT3 Cup	Porsche 4.0 L Flat-6	979	(Belgium) Jean-Michel Gerome	Am
(Belgium) Speed Lover	Porsche 992 GT3 Cup	Porsche 4.0 L Flat-6	979	(France) Eric Mouez	Am
GT4 (3 entries)
(United Kingdom) RAM Racing	Mercedes-AMG GT4	Mercedes-AMG M178 4.0 L V8	405	(United Kingdom) Phil Keen	
(United Kingdom) RAM Racing	Mercedes-AMG GT4	Mercedes-AMG M178 4.0 L V8	405	(United Kingdom) Phil Quaife	
(United Kingdom) RAM Racing	Mercedes-AMG GT4	Mercedes-AMG M178 4.0 L V8	405	(United Kingdom) James Thorpe	
(United Arab Emirates) Buggyra ZM Racing	Mercedes-AMG GT4	Mercedes-AMG M178 4.0 L V8	416	(United Arab Emirates) Aliyyah Koloc	
(United Arab Emirates) Buggyra ZM Racing	Mercedes-AMG GT4	Mercedes-AMG M178 4.0 L V8	416	(Czech Republic) Adam Lacko	
(United Arab Emirates) Buggyra ZM Racing	Mercedes-AMG GT4	Mercedes-AMG M178 4.0 L V8	416	(Czech Republic) David Vršecký	
(United Kingdom) Simpson Motorsport	BMW M4 GT4 Gen II	BMW N55 3.0 L Twin-Turbo I6	438	(United Kingdom) David Holloway	
(United Kingdom) Simpson Motorsport	BMW M4 GT4 Gen II	BMW N55 3.0 L Twin-Turbo I6	438	(Cyprus) Vasily Vladykin	
(United Kingdom) Simpson Motorsport	BMW M4 GT4 Gen II	BMW N55 3.0 L Twin-Turbo I6	438	(United Kingdom) Carl Cavers	
TCR (4 entries)
(Switzerland) Wolf-Power Racing	Audi RS 3 LMS TCR (2021)	Volkswagen EA888 2.0 L I4	121	(Switzerland) Jasmin Preisig	
(Switzerland) Wolf-Power Racing	Audi RS 3 LMS TCR (2021)	Volkswagen EA888 2.0 L I4	121	(Latvia) Ivars Vallers	
(Switzerland) Wolf-Power Racing	Audi RS 3 LMS TCR (2021)	Volkswagen EA888 2.0 L I4	121	(Belgium) Nicolas Baert	
(Switzerland) Wolf-Power Racing	Audi RS 3 LMS TCR (2021)	Volkswagen EA888 2.0 L I4	121	(United Kingdom) Ricky Coomber	
(Germany) Sharky-Racing	Audi RS 3 LMS TCR (2017)	Volkswagen EA888 2.0 L I4	176	(Armenia) Artur Goroyan	
(Germany) Sharky-Racing	Audi RS 3 LMS TCR (2017)	Volkswagen EA888 2.0 L I4	176	(Fédération Internationale de l'Automobile) Roman Mavlanov (Note: Roman Mavlanov is Russian, but competes as a neutral competitor using the Fédération Internationale de l'Automobile flag as Belarusian and Russian national emblems were banned by the association due to the Russian invasion of Ukraine.)	
(Belgium) AC Motorsport	Audi RS 3 LMS TCR (2021)	Volkswagen EA888 2.0 L I4	188	(Argentina) Marcos Costantini	
(Belgium) AC Motorsport	Audi RS 3 LMS TCR (2021)	Volkswagen EA888 2.0 L I4	188	(Lithuania) Jonas Karklys	
(Belgium) AC Motorsport	Audi RS 3 LMS TCR (2021)	Volkswagen EA888 2.0 L I4	188	(Denmark) Niels Ulrich Nyboe	
(Belgium) AC Motorsport	Audi RS 3 LMS TCR (2017)	Volkswagen EA888 2.0 L I4	199	(Switzerland) Mato Matosevic	
(Belgium) AC Motorsport	Audi RS 3 LMS TCR (2017)	Volkswagen EA888 2.0 L I4	199	(France) Victor Moutinho	
(Belgium) AC Motorsport	Audi RS 3 LMS TCR (2017)	Volkswagen EA888 2.0 L I4	199	(Netherlands) Paul Sieljes	

GT3 entries
Icon	Class
P	GT3-Pro
PA	GT3-Pro Am
Am	GT3-Am
992 entries
Icon	Class
P	992-Pro
Am	992-Am

== Practice ==
Class	No.	Entrant	Driver	Time
GT3	911	(Lithuania) Pure Rxcing	(United Kingdom) Harry King	1:54.3 02
GTX	714	(Austria) razoon-more than racing	(Kuwait) Haytham Qarajouli	1:58.738
992	929	QMMF by HRT Thuraya Qatar	(Germany) Julian Hanses	1:56.808
GT4	405	(United Kingdom) RAM Racing	(United Kingdom) Phil Quaife	2:05.572
TCR	176	(Germany) Sharky-Racing	(Fédération Internationale de l'Automobile) Roman Mavlanov	2:07.939

- Note: Only the fastest car in each class is shown.

== Qualifying ==
=== Qualifying Results ===
Pole positions in each class are indicated in bold.

Pos.	Class	No.	Team	Q1	Q2	Q3	Avg
1	**GT3 Pro**	**911**	**(Lithuania) Pure Rxcing**	1:55.650	1:54.891	1:55.133	**1:55.224**
2	GT3 Pro	21	(Antigua and Barbuda) HAAS RT	1:58.683	1:54.492	1:55.246	1:56.140
3	GT3 Pro	12	(Netherlands) JR Motorsport	2:00.672	1:55.594	1:56.082	1:57.449
4	**GT3 Pro/Am**	**1**	**(Germany) Phoenix Racing**	2:03.028	1:55.007	1:56.328	**1:58.121**
5	**992 Pro**	**930**	**(Germany) HRT Performance**	2:00.664	1:57.889	1:57.797	**1:58.783**
6	992 Pro	909	(Netherlands) Red Camel-Jordans.nl	1:58.891	1:59.247	1:58.274	1:58.804
7	**GTX**	**714**	**(Austria) razoon-more than racing**	1:58.173	1:59.152	1:59.437	**1:58.920**
8	**992 Am**	**928**	**(Germany) NKPP by HRT Performance**	1:58.295	2:00.0 89	1:58.977	**1:59.120**
9	992 Pro	955	(Romania) Willi Motorsport by Ebimotors	2:00.115	1:59.217	1:58.180	1:59.170
10	992 Am	929	QMMF Racing by HRT Thuraya Qatar	1:58.991	1:57.625	2:01.663	1:59.426
11	992 Pro	931	(Germany) HRT Performance	2:00.856	1:58.792	1:59.655	1:59.767
12	GTX	701	(France) Vortex V8	2:00.909	2:04.117	2:03.434	2:02.820
13	GTX	763	(Germany) Tischner Motorsport	2:00.328	2:07.492	2:03.252	2:03.690
14	992 Am	979	(Belgium) Speed Lover	2:02.969	2:03.683	2:04.590	2:03.747
15	GTX	721	(Portugal) P21 Motorsport	2:05.379	2:05.790	2:01.786	2:04.318
16	**GT4**	**405**	**(United Kingdom) RAM Racing**	2:05.594	2:04.618	2:04.948	**2:05.053**
17	GT4	438	(United Kingdom) Simpson Motorsport	2:06.471	2:05.664	2:06.706	2:06.280
18	GT4	416	(United Arab Emirates) Buggyra ZM Racing	2:06.522	2:06.713	2:06.013	2:06.416
19	**TCR**	**176**	**(Germany) Sharky-Racing**	2:12.339	2:08.348	2:08.592	**2:09.759**
20	TCR	199	(Belgium) AC Motorsport	2:22.676	2:09.322	2:59.834	2:30.610
21	GT3 Pro	91	(Germany) Herberth Motorsport	—	1:54.541	1:56.050	1:55.295
22	**GT3 Am**	**44**	**(Slovakia) ARC Bratislava**	1:58.170	1:57.231	—	**1:57.700**
23	TCR	121	(Switzerland) Autorama Motorsport by Wolf-Power Racing	2:10.157	2:09.066	—	2:09.611
24	TCR	188	(Belgium) AC Motorsport	—	2:07.051	—	2:07.051
DNC	GTX	710	(Germany) Leipert Motorsport	No time	No time	No time	No time
DNC	992 Pro	977	(United Arab Emirates) RABDAN Motorsports	No time	No time	No time	No time

== Race ==
=== Race results ===
Class winners are in bold.

Pos	Class	No	Team	Drivers	Car	Laps	Time/Reason
Pos	Class	No	Team	Drivers	Engine	Laps	Time/Reason
1	**GT3 Pro**	**911**	**(Lithuania) Pure Rxcing**	**(United Kingdom) Harry King** **(United Kingdom) Alex Malykhin** **(Germany) Joel Sturm**	**Porsche 911 GT3 R**	**165**	**6:00:34.723**
1	**GT3 Pro**	**911**	**(Lithuania) Pure Rxcing**	**(United Kingdom) Harry King** **(United Kingdom) Alex Malykhin** **(Germany) Joel Sturm**	**Porsche 4.0 L Flat-6**	**165**	**6:00:34.723**
2	GT3 Pro	91	(Germany) Herberth Motorsport	(Germany) Felix Neuhofer (Germany) Markus Neuhofer (Germany) Alfred Renauer (Germany) Robert Renauer	Porsche 911 GT3 R	165	+7.226
2	GT3 Pro	91	(Germany) Herberth Motorsport	(Germany) Felix Neuhofer (Germany) Markus Neuhofer (Germany) Alfred Renauer (Germany) Robert Renauer	Porsche 4.0 L Flat-6	165	+7.226
3	GT3 Pro	21	(Antigua and Barbuda) HAAS RT	(France) Stéphane Perrin (Belgium) Mathieu Detry (Belgium) Maxime Soulet	Audi R8 LMS Evo II	165	+10.032
3	GT3 Pro	21	(Antigua and Barbuda) HAAS RT	(France) Stéphane Perrin (Belgium) Mathieu Detry (Belgium) Maxime Soulet	Audi DAR 5.2 L V10	165	+10.032
4	**GT3 Pro/Am**	**1**	**(Germany) Phoenix Racing**	**(Austria) Michael Doppelmayr** **(Germany) Pierre Kaffer** **(Germany) Elia Erhart** **(Germany) Sven Herberger**	**Audi R8 LMS Evo II**	**165**	**+21.860**
4	**GT3 Pro/Am**	**1**	**(Germany) Phoenix Racing**	**(Austria) Michael Doppelmayr** **(Germany) Pierre Kaffer** **(Germany) Elia Erhart** **(Germany) Sven Herberger**	**Audi DAR 5.2 L V10**	**165**	**+21.860**
5	**992 Pro**	**909**	**(Netherlands) Red Camel-Jordans.nl**	**(Netherlands) Ivo Breukers** **(Netherlands) Luc Breukers** **(Netherlands) Rik Breukers** **(Switzerland) Fabian Danz**	**Porsche 992 GT3 Cup**	**163**	**+2 Laps**
5	**992 Pro**	**909**	**(Netherlands) Red Camel-Jordans.nl**	**(Netherlands) Ivo Breukers** **(Netherlands) Luc Breukers** **(Netherlands) Rik Breukers** **(Switzerland) Fabian Danz**	**Porsche 4.0 L Flat-6**	**163**	**+2 Laps**
6	**992 Am**	**928**	**(Germany) NKPP by HRT Performance**	**(Finland) Miika Panu** **(Finland) Jim Rautiainen**	**Porsche 992 GT3 Cup**	**163**	**+2 Laps**
6	**992 Am**	**928**	**(Germany) NKPP by HRT Performance**	**(Finland) Miika Panu** **(Finland) Jim Rautiainen**	**Porsche 4.0 L Flat-6**	**163**	**+2 Laps**
7	992 Pro	931	(Germany) HRT Performance	(Germany) Fidel Leib (South Africa) Mikaeel Pitamber	Porsche 992 GT3 Cup	162	+3 Laps
7	992 Pro	931	(Germany) HRT Performance	(Germany) Fidel Leib (South Africa) Mikaeel Pitamber	Porsche 4.0 L Flat-6	162	+3 Laps
8	992 Pro	955	(Romania) Willi Motorsport by Ebimotors	(Italy) Fabrizio Broggi (Italy) Sabino de Castro (Romania) Sergiu Nicolae	Porsche 992 GT3 Cup	162	+3 Laps
8	992 Pro	955	(Romania) Willi Motorsport by Ebimotors	(Italy) Fabrizio Broggi (Italy) Sabino de Castro (Romania) Sergiu Nicolae	Porsche 4.0 L Flat-6	162	+3 Laps
9	992 Pro	930	(Germany) HRT Performance	(Finland) Antti Buri (Finland) Kari-Pekka Laaksonen	Porsche 992 GT3 Cup	162	+3 Laps
9	992 Pro	930	(Germany) HRT Performance	(Finland) Antti Buri (Finland) Kari-Pekka Laaksonen	Porsche 4.0 L Flat-6	162	+3 Laps
10	**GT3 Am**	**44**	**(Slovakia) ARC Bratislava**	**(Slovakia) Miro Konôpka** **(Poland) Andrzej Lewandowski**	**Lamborghini Huracán GT3**	**161**	**+4 Laps**
10	**GT3 Am**	**44**	**(Slovakia) ARC Bratislava**	**(Slovakia) Miro Konôpka** **(Poland) Andrzej Lewandowski**	**Lamborghini DGF 5.2 L V10**	**161**	**+4 Laps**
11	**GTX**	**714**	**(Austria) Razoon – More than Racing**	**(Austria) Daniel Drexel** **(Austria) Dominik Olbert** **(Kuwait) Haytham Qarajouli** **(Austria) Laura Kraihamer**	**KTM X-Bow GT2 Concept**	**159**	**+6 Laps**
11	**GTX**	**714**	**(Austria) Razoon – More than Racing**	**(Austria) Daniel Drexel** **(Austria) Dominik Olbert** **(Kuwait) Haytham Qarajouli** **(Austria) Laura Kraihamer**	**Audi TFSI 2.5 L I5**	**159**	**+6 Laps**
12	GTX	763	(Germany) Tischner Motorsport	(Germany) Uwe Kleen (Germany) Matthias Tischner (Germany) Michael Tischner	Porsche 991 GT3 II Cup	159	+6 Laps
12	GTX	763	(Germany) Tischner Motorsport	(Germany) Uwe Kleen (Germany) Matthias Tischner (Germany) Michael Tischner	Porsche 4.0 L Flat-6	159	+6 Laps
13	GTX	721	(Portugal) P21 Motorsport	(United Kingdom) Chris Hillaby (Portugal) José Monroy (Portugal) Rui Miritta	Porsche 991 GT3 II Cup	153	+12 Laps
13	GTX	721	(Portugal) P21 Motorsport	(United Kingdom) Chris Hillaby (Portugal) José Monroy (Portugal) Rui Miritta	Porsche 4.0 L Flat-6	153	+12 Laps
14	**GT4**	**416**	**(United Arab Emirates) Buggyra ZM Racing**	**(United Arab Emirates) Aliyyah Koloc** **(Czech Republic) Adam Lacko** **(Czech Republic) David Vršecký**	**Mercedes-AMG GT4**	**153**	**+12 Laps**
14	**GT4**	**416**	**(United Arab Emirates) Buggyra ZM Racing**	**(United Arab Emirates) Aliyyah Koloc** **(Czech Republic) Adam Lacko** **(Czech Republic) David Vršecký**	**Mercedes-AMG M178 4.0 L V8**	**153**	**+12 Laps**
15	GT4	405	(United Kingdom) RAM Racing	(United Kingdom) Phil Keen (United Kingdom) Phil Quaife (United Kingdom) James Thorpe	Mercedes-AMG GT4	152	+13 Laps
15	GT4	405	(United Kingdom) RAM Racing	(United Kingdom) Phil Keen (United Kingdom) Phil Quaife (United Kingdom) James Thorpe	Mercedes-AMG M178 4.0 L V8	152	+13 Laps
16	GT3 Pro	12	(Netherlands) JR Motorsport	(Netherlands) Ted van Vliet (Netherlands) Max Weering	BMW M6 GT3	160	+5 Laps
16	GT3 Pro	12	(Netherlands) JR Motorsport	(Netherlands) Ted van Vliet (Netherlands) Max Weering	BMW S63 4.4 L Turbo V8	160	+5 Laps
17	**TCR**	**176**	**(Germany) Sharky-Racing**	**(Armenia) Artur Goroyan** **(Fédération Internationale de l'Automobile) Roman Mavlanov**	**Audi RS 3 LMS TCR (2017)**	**150**	**+15 Laps**
17	**TCR**	**176**	**(Germany) Sharky-Racing**	**(Armenia) Artur Goroyan** **(Fédération Internationale de l'Automobile) Roman Mavlanov**	**Volkswagen EA888 2.0 L I4**	**150**	**+15 Laps**
18	TCR	121	(Switzerland) Wolf-Power Racing	(Switzerland) Jasmin Preisig (Latvia) Ivars Vallers (Belgium) Nicolas Baert (United Kingdom) Ricky Coomber	Audi RS 3 LMS TCR (2021)	150	+15 Laps
18	TCR	121	(Switzerland) Wolf-Power Racing	(Switzerland) Jasmin Preisig (Latvia) Ivars Vallers (Belgium) Nicolas Baert (United Kingdom) Ricky Coomber	Volkswagen EA888 2.0 L I4	150	+15 Laps
19	992 Am	929	QMMF by HRT Thuraya Qatar	(Germany) Julian Hanses (Qatar) Abdulla Ali Al-Khelaifi (Qatar) Ibrahim Al-Abdulghani (Qatar) Ghanim Al Maadheed	Porsche 992 GT3 Cup	146	+19 Laps
19	992 Am	929	QMMF by HRT Thuraya Qatar	(Germany) Julian Hanses (Qatar) Abdulla Ali Al-Khelaifi (Qatar) Ibrahim Al-Abdulghani (Qatar) Ghanim Al Maadheed	Porsche 4.0 L Flat-6	146	+19 Laps
20 DNF	GTX	701	(France) Vortex V8	(France) Lionel Amrouche (France) Julien Boillot (France) Philippe Bonnel	Vortex 1.0 GTX	138	Stopped
20 DNF	GTX	701	(France) Vortex V8	(France) Lionel Amrouche (France) Julien Boillot (France) Philippe Bonnel	Chevrolet LS3 6.2 L V8	138	Stopped
21	TCR	188	(Belgium) AC Motorsport	(Argentina) Marcos Costantini (Lithuania) Jonas Karklys (Denmark) Niels Ulrich Nyboe	Audi RS 3 LMS TCR (2021)	116	+49 Laps
21	TCR	188	(Belgium) AC Motorsport	(Argentina) Marcos Costantini (Lithuania) Jonas Karklys (Denmark) Niels Ulrich Nyboe	Volkswagen EA888 2.0 L I4	116	+49 Laps
22 DNF	TCR	199	(Belgium) AC Motorsport	(Switzerland) Mato Matosevic (France) Victor Moutinho (Netherlands) Paul Sieljes	Audi RS 3 LMS TCR (2017)	88	Gearbox
22 DNF	TCR	199	(Belgium) AC Motorsport	(Switzerland) Mato Matosevic (France) Victor Moutinho (Netherlands) Paul Sieljes	Volkswagen EA888 2.0 L I4	88	Gearbox
DNC	GT4	438	(United Kingdom) Simpson Motorsport	(United Kingdom) David Holloway (Cyprus) Vasily Vladykin (United Kingdom) Carl Cavers	BMW M4 GT4 Gen II	47	Alternator belt
DNC	GT4	438	(United Kingdom) Simpson Motorsport	(United Kingdom) David Holloway (Cyprus) Vasily Vladykin (United Kingdom) Carl Cavers	BMW N55 3.0 L Twin-Turbo I6	47	Alternator belt
DNC	992 Am	979	(Belgium) Speed Lover	(Belgium) Olivier Dons (Belgium) Jean-Michel Gerome (France) Eric Mouez	Porsche 992 GT3 Cup	30	Did not finish
DNC	992 Am	979	(Belgium) Speed Lover	(Belgium) Olivier Dons (Belgium) Jean-Michel Gerome (France) Eric Mouez	Porsche 4.0 L Flat-6	30	Did not finish
DNS	GTX	710	(Germany) Leipert Motorsport	(United States) Gregg Gorski (United States) Josh Hansen (Germany) Jürgen Krebs	Lamborghini Huracán Super Trofeo Evo	0	Did not start
DNS	GTX	710	(Germany) Leipert Motorsport	(United States) Gregg Gorski (United States) Josh Hansen (Germany) Jürgen Krebs	Lamborghini DGF 5.2 L V10	0	Did not start
DNS	992 Pro	977	(United Arab Emirates) RABDAN Motorsports	(United Arab Emirates) Saif Al Ameri (United Arab Emirates) Salem Al Ketbi (United Arab Emirates) Helal Ali Mazrouei (United Arab Emirates) Saeed Al Mehairi	Porsche 992 GT3 Cup	0	Did not start
DNS	992 Pro	977	(United Arab Emirates) RABDAN Motorsports	(United Arab Emirates) Saif Al Ameri (United Arab Emirates) Salem Al Ketbi (United Arab Emirates) Helal Ali Mazrouei (United Arab Emirates) Saeed Al Mehairi	Porsche 4.0 L Flat-6	0	Did not start
