= 2026 GT World Challenge Europe Sprint Cup =

Motorsports season

The 2026 GT World Challenge Europe Sprint Cup was the fourteenth season of the GT World Challenge Europe Sprint Cup following on from the demise of the SRO Motorsports Group's FIA GT1 World Championship (an auto racing series for grand tourer cars).

The season began on 2 May at Brands Hatch, and finished on 4 October at Circuit de Barcelona-Catalunya.

== Calendar ==
The calendar was released on 27 June 2025, featuring five rounds.

Round	Circuit	Date	Map
1	(United Kingdom) Brands Hatch, Kent	2–3 May	2026 GT World Challenge Europe Sprint Cup is located in Europe
2	(Italy) Misano World Circuit Marco Simoncelli, Misano Adriatico	18–19 July	2026 GT World Challenge Europe Sprint Cup is located in Europe
3	(France) Circuit de Nevers Magny-Cours, Magny-Cours	1–2 August	2026 GT World Challenge Europe Sprint Cup is located in Europe
4	(Netherlands) Circuit Zandvoort, Zandvoort	18–19 September	2026 GT World Challenge Europe Sprint Cup is located in Europe
5	(Spain) Circuit de Barcelona-Catalunya, Montmeló	3–4 October	2026 GT World Challenge Europe Sprint Cup is located in Europe

== Entry list ==
Team	Car	No.	Drivers	Class	Rounds
(Belgium) Boutsen VDS	Porsche 911 GT3 R (992.2)	2	(France) Dorian Boccolacci	P	All
(Belgium) Boutsen VDS	Porsche 911 GT3 R (992.2)	2	(Netherlands) Morris Schuring	P	1–2, 4
(Belgium) Boutsen VDS	Porsche 911 GT3 R (992.2)	2	(Belgium) Alessio Picariello	P	3
(Belgium) Boutsen VDS	Porsche 911 GT3 R (992.2)	2	(Germany) Sven Müller	P	5
(Belgium) Boutsen VDS	Porsche 911 GT3 R (992.2)	10	(Sweden) Robin Knutsson	G	All
(Belgium) Boutsen VDS	Porsche 911 GT3 R (992.2)	10	(Belgium) Gilles Magnus	G	All
(Netherlands) Mercedes-AMG Team Verstappen Racing	Mercedes-AMG GT3 Evo	3	(Spain) Daniel Juncadella	P	All
(Netherlands) Mercedes-AMG Team Verstappen Racing	Mercedes-AMG GT3 Evo	3	(United Kingdom) Chris Lulham	P	1, 4–5
(Netherlands) Mercedes-AMG Team Verstappen Racing	Mercedes-AMG GT3 Evo	3	(Andorra) Jules Gounon	P	2–3
(Bahrain) 2 Seas Motorsport	Mercedes-AMG GT3 Evo	222	(United Kingdom) Charles Dawson	B	2–5
(Bahrain) 2 Seas Motorsport	Mercedes-AMG GT3 Evo	222	(United Kingdom) Kiern Jewiss	B	2–5
(United Kingdom) Optimum Motorsport	McLaren 720S GT3 Evo	5	(Portugal) Guilherme Oliveira	S	All
(United Kingdom) Optimum Motorsport	McLaren 720S GT3 Evo	5	(United Kingdom) Mikey Porter	S	All
(United States) GetSpeed Team Bartone Bros	Mercedes-AMG GT3 Evo	6	(United States) Anthony Bartone	S	All
(United States) GetSpeed Team Bartone Bros	Mercedes-AMG GT3 Evo	6	(France) Aurélien Panis	S	All
(United Arab Emirates) GetSpeed Team Dubai	Mercedes-AMG GT3 Evo	12	(Luxembourg) Gabriel Rindone	B	2–5
(United Arab Emirates) GetSpeed Team Dubai	Mercedes-AMG GT3 Evo	12	(Germany) Fabian Schiller	B	2–5
(Belgium) Comtoyou Racing	Aston Martin Vantage AMR GT3 Evo	7	(Belgium) Kobe Pauwels	P	All
(Belgium) Comtoyou Racing	Aston Martin Vantage AMR GT3 Evo	7	(Denmark) Nicki Thiim	P	All
(Belgium) Comtoyou Racing	Aston Martin Vantage AMR GT3 Evo	11	(Italy) Felice Jelmini	B	2–5
(Belgium) Comtoyou Racing	Aston Martin Vantage AMR GT3 Evo	11	(Brazil) Marcelo Tomasoni	B	2–5
(Belgium) Comtoyou Racing	Aston Martin Vantage AMR GT3 Evo	21	(France) Arthur Dorison	S	All
(Belgium) Comtoyou Racing	Aston Martin Vantage AMR GT3 Evo	21	(Sweden) Oliver Söderström	S	All
(Lithuania) Pure Rxcing	Porsche 911 GT3 R (992.2)	9	(United Kingdom) Alex Malykhin (Note: Malykhin is Belarusian, but he competed under a British licence as Belarusian national emblems were banned by the FIA following the Russian invasion of Ukraine. Although the ban was lifted on 13 August 2026, Malykhin retained his British licence.)	S	All
(Lithuania) Pure Rxcing	Porsche 911 GT3 R (992.2)	9	(Slovenia) Alexey Nesov (Note: Gvazava and Salikhov are Russian, but they competed as neutral competitors at rounds 1–3 as Russian national emblems were banned by the FIA following the Russian invasion of Ukraine. Nesov, also a Russian, competed under a Slovene licence for the same reason. The ban was lifted on 13 August 2026.)	S	1
(Lithuania) Pure Rxcing	Porsche 911 GT3 R (992.2)	9	(Italy) Riccardo Pera	S	2, 4
(Lithuania) Pure Rxcing	Porsche 911 GT3 R (992.2)	9	(Denmark) Mikkel O. Pedersen	S	3, 5
(Switzerland) Emil Frey Racing	Ferrari 296 GT3 Evo	14	(Italy) Matteo Cairoli	P	All
(Switzerland) Emil Frey Racing	Ferrari 296 GT3 Evo	14	(Finland) Konsta Lappalainen	P	All
(Switzerland) Emil Frey Racing	Ferrari 296 GT3 Evo	69	(United Kingdom) Ben Green	P	All
(Switzerland) Emil Frey Racing	Ferrari 296 GT3 Evo	69	(Netherlands) Thierry Vermeulen	P	All
(France) Saintéloc Racing	Audi R8 LMS Evo II	26	(France) Michael Blanchemain	B	3
(France) Saintéloc Racing	Audi R8 LMS Evo II	26	(France) Jim Pla	B	3
(Switzerland) Kessel Racing	Ferrari 296 GT3 Evo	27	(Italy) David Fumanelli	B	2–5
(Switzerland) Kessel Racing	Ferrari 296 GT3 Evo	27	(Italy) Marco Pulcini	B	2–5
(Switzerland) Kessel Racing	Ferrari 296 GT3 Evo	74	(Germany) Dennis Marschall	B	2–5
(Switzerland) Kessel Racing	Ferrari 296 GT3 Evo	74	(United States) Dustin Blattner	B	2–4
(Switzerland) Kessel Racing	Ferrari 296 GT3 Evo	74	(Germany) Constantin Dressler	B	5
(Belgium) Team WRT	BMW M4 GT3 Evo	30	(Belgium) Matisse Lismont	S	All
(Belgium) Team WRT	BMW M4 GT3 Evo	30	(Argentina) Ignacio Montenegro	S	All
(Belgium) Team WRT	BMW M4 GT3 Evo	31	(Belgium) Amaury Cordeel	P	All
(Belgium) Team WRT	BMW M4 GT3 Evo	31	(South Africa) Jordan Pepper	P	All
(Belgium) Team WRT	BMW M4 GT3 Evo	32	(South Africa) Kelvin van der Linde	P	All
(Belgium) Team WRT	BMW M4 GT3 Evo	32	(Belgium) Charles Weerts	P	All
(Belgium) Team WRT	BMW M4 GT3 Evo	46	(Germany) Max Hesse	P	All
(Belgium) Team WRT	BMW M4 GT3 Evo	46	(Italy) Valentino Rossi	P	All
(Germany) Walkenhorst Motorsport	Aston Martin Vantage AMR GT3 Evo	34	(United Arab Emirates) Jamie Day	S	All
(Germany) Walkenhorst Motorsport	Aston Martin Vantage AMR GT3 Evo	34	(Ecuador) Mateo Villagómez	S	All
(Germany) Walkenhorst Motorsport	Aston Martin Vantage AMR GT3 Evo	35	(France) Maxime Robin	S	All
(Germany) Walkenhorst Motorsport	Aston Martin Vantage AMR GT3 Evo	35	(France) Gaspard Simon	S	All
(United States) Winward Racing	Mercedes-AMG GT3 Evo	48	(Austria) Lucas Auer	P	All
(United States) Winward Racing	Mercedes-AMG GT3 Evo	48	(Germany) Maro Engel	P	All
(United States) Winward Racing	Mercedes-AMG GT3 Evo	87	(Germany) Marvin Dienst	B	2–5
(United States) Winward Racing	Mercedes-AMG GT3 Evo	87	(Russia) Rinat Salikhov	B	2–5
(Italy) AF Corse	Ferrari 296 GT3 Evo	50	(Monaco) Arthur Leclerc	P	All
(Italy) AF Corse	Ferrari 296 GT3 Evo	50	(France) Thomas Neubauer	P	All
(Italy) AF Corse	Ferrari 296 GT3 Evo	51	(Italy) Tommaso Mosca	G	All
(Italy) AF Corse	Ferrari 296 GT3 Evo	51	(Peru) Matías Zagazeta	G	All
(Italy) AF Corse	Ferrari 296 GT3 Evo	52	(Belgium) Jef Machiels	S	All
(Italy) AF Corse	Ferrari 296 GT3 Evo	52	(Belgium) Gilles Stadsbader	S	All
(Italy) AF Corse	Ferrari 296 GT3 Evo	71	(Thailand) Carl Bennett	S	All
(Italy) AF Corse	Ferrari 296 GT3 Evo	71	(Switzerland) Felix Hirsiger	S	All
(Italy) Dinamic GT	Porsche 911 GT3 R (992.2)	54	(Thailand) Tanart Sathienthirakul	S	All
(Italy) Dinamic GT	Porsche 911 GT3 R (992.2)	54	(France) Loris Cabirou	S	1
(Italy) Dinamic GT	Porsche 911 GT3 R (992.2)	54	(Slovenia) Mark Kastelic	S	2–5
(Italy) Dinamic GT	Porsche 911 GT3 R (992.2)	55	(France) Loris Cabirou	B	2–5
(Italy) Dinamic GT	Porsche 911 GT3 R (992.2)	55	(Russia) Dmitry Gvazava	B	2–5
(United Kingdom) Garage 59	McLaren 720S GT3 Evo	58	(United Kingdom) Tom Fleming	G	All
(United Kingdom) Garage 59	McLaren 720S GT3 Evo	58	(Monaco) Louis Prette	G	All
(United Kingdom) Garage 59	McLaren 720S GT3 Evo	59	(United Kingdom) Dean MacDonald	P	All
(United Kingdom) Garage 59	McLaren 720S GT3 Evo	59	(Germany) Marvin Kirchhöfer	P	1–4
(United Kingdom) Garage 59	McLaren 720S GT3 Evo	59	(United Kingdom) Joseph Loake	P	5
(Germany) Tresor Attempto Racing	Audi R8 LMS Evo II	66	(Italy) Andrea Frassineti	S	All
(Germany) Tresor Attempto Racing	Audi R8 LMS Evo II	66	(Israel) Ariel Levi	S	All
(Germany) Tresor Attempto Racing	Audi R8 LMS Evo II	88	(Denmark) Sebastian Øgaard	B	2–5
(Germany) Tresor Attempto Racing	Audi R8 LMS Evo II	88	(Germany) Carrie Schreiner	B	2–5
(Germany) Tresor Attempto Racing	Audi R8 LMS Evo II	99	(Germany) Alex Aka	G	All
(Germany) Tresor Attempto Racing	Audi R8 LMS Evo II	99	(Luxembourg) Dylan Pereira	G	All
(Netherlands) KPX Motorsport	BMW M4 GT3 Evo	77	(United Kingdom) David Pittard	G	All
(Netherlands) KPX Motorsport	BMW M4 GT3 Evo	77	(Netherlands) Jop Rappange	G	All
(Germany) Lionspeed GP	Porsche 911 GT3 R (992.2)	80	(Denmark) Bastian Buus	P	All
(Germany) Lionspeed GP	Porsche 911 GT3 R (992.2)	80	(Switzerland) Ricardo Feller	P	All
(Germany) Lionspeed GP	Porsche 911 GT3 R (992.2)	89	(Belgium) Nicolas Baert	S	4–5
(Germany) Lionspeed GP	Porsche 911 GT3 R (992.2)	89	(Netherlands) Flynt Schuring	S	4
(Germany) Lionspeed GP	Porsche 911 GT3 R (992.2)	89	(Sweden) Gustav Bergström	S	5
(Austria) Eastalent Racing	Audi R8 LMS Evo II	84	(Germany) Christopher Haase	P	All
(Austria) Eastalent Racing	Audi R8 LMS Evo II	84	(Austria) Simon Reicher	P	All
(United Kingdom) Ziggo Sport – Tempesta Racing	Porsche 911 GT3 R (992.2)	93	(Italy) Eddie Cheever III	B	2–5
(United Kingdom) Ziggo Sport – Tempesta Racing	Porsche 911 GT3 R (992.2)	93	(Republic of Ireland) Peter Dempsey	B	2–5
(Germany) Rutronik Racing	Lamborghini Temerario GT3	96	(Germany) Luca Engstler	P	All
(Germany) Rutronik Racing	Lamborghini Temerario GT3	96	(Switzerland) Patric Niederhauser	P	All
(France) CSA Racing	McLaren 720S GT3 Evo	111	(United Kingdom) James Kell	G	All
(France) CSA Racing	McLaren 720S GT3 Evo	111	(France) Arthur Rougier	G	All
(France) CSA Racing	McLaren 720S GT3 Evo	555	(France) Romain Andriolo	G	All
(France) CSA Racing	McLaren 720S GT3 Evo	555	(France) Simon Gachet	G	All
(Italy) VSR	Lamborghini Temerario GT3	163	(Italy) Mattia Michelotto	G	All
(Italy) VSR	Lamborghini Temerario GT3	163	(Italy) Loris Spinelli	G	All
(Austria) Razoon – more than racing	Porsche 911 GT3 R (992.2)	914	(Denmark) Simon Birch	S	1
(Austria) Razoon – more than racing	Porsche 911 GT3 R (992.2)	914	(Norway) Magnus Gustavsen	S	1
(Austria) Razoon – more than racing	Porsche 911 GT3 R (992.2)	914	(Austria) Klaus Bachler	P	4
(Austria) Razoon – more than racing	Porsche 911 GT3 R (992.2)	914	(Denmark) Simon Birch	P	4
(United Kingdom) Paradine Competition	BMW M4 GT3 Evo	991	(Brazil) Augusto Farfus	B	2–5
(United Kingdom) Paradine Competition	BMW M4 GT3 Evo	991	(United Kingdom) Darren Leung	B	2–5

Icon	Class
P	Pro Cup
G	Gold Cup
S	Silver Cup
B	Bronze Cup

- KPX Motorsport provisionally entered a lineup of team co-owner Peter Kox and daughter Stéphane Kox, but later announced David Pittard and Jop Rappange.
- Denny Berndt and Leo Pichler were scheduled to share Razoon – more than racing's lone Porsche, but the team reshuffled its lineup prior to the start of the season.
- Alex Fontana and Bashar Mardini were scheduled to share Lionspeed GP's No. 89 Porsche in Bronze Cup, but did not appear at any rounds. The car was brought back for the final two rounds, in Silver Cup with a different lineup.
- Daniil Move was scheduled to compete for Ziggo Sport – Tempesta Racing, but was replaced prior to the start of the season.

== Race results ==
Round		Circuit	Pole Position	Overall Winners	Gold Winners	Silver Winners	Bronze Winners	Report
1	R1	(United Kingdom) Brands Hatch	(Germany) #80 Lionspeed GP	(Italy) #50 AF Corse	(Italy) #51 AF Corse	(United Kingdom) #5 Optimum Motorsport	Did not participate	Report
1	R1	(United Kingdom) Brands Hatch	(Denmark) Bastian Buus (Switzerland) Ricardo Feller	(Monaco) Arthur Leclerc (France) Thomas Neubauer	(Italy) Tommaso Mosca (Peru) Matías Zagazeta	(Portugal) Guilherme Oliveira (United Kingdom) Mikey Porter	Did not participate	Report
1	R2	(United Kingdom) Brands Hatch	(Germany) #80 Lionspeed GP	(Germany) #80 Lionspeed GP	(France) #555 CSA Racing	(Belgium) #30 Team WRT	Did not participate	Report
1	R2	(United Kingdom) Brands Hatch	(Denmark) Bastian Buus (Switzerland) Ricardo Feller	(Denmark) Bastian Buus (Switzerland) Ricardo Feller	(France) Romain Andriolo (France) Simon Gachet	(Belgium) Matisse Lismont (Argentina) Ignacio Montenegro	Did not participate	Report
2	R1	(Italy) Misano	(Belgium) #46 Team WRT	(Belgium) #32 Team WRT	(Germany) #99 Tresor Attempto Racing	(Belgium) #30 Team WRT	(United Arab Emirates) #12 GetSpeed Team Dubai	Report
2	R1	(Italy) Misano	(Germany) Max Hesse (Italy) Valentino Rossi	(South Africa) Kelvin van der Linde (Belgium) Charles Weerts	(Germany) Alex Aka (Luxembourg) Dylan Pereira	(Belgium) Matisse Lismont (Argentina) Ignacio Montenegro	(Luxembourg) Gabriel Rindone (Germany) Fabian Schiller	Report
2	R2	(Italy) Misano	(Netherlands) #3 Mercedes-AMG Team Verstappen Racing	(Belgium) #32 Team WRT	(Germany) #99 Tresor Attempto Racing	(United States) #6 GetSpeed Team Bartone Bros	(United States) #87 Winward Racing	Report
2	R2	(Italy) Misano	(Andorra) Jules Gounon (Spain) Daniel Juncadella	(South Africa) Kelvin van der Linde (Belgium) Charles Weerts	(Germany) Alex Aka (Luxembourg) Dylan Pereira	(United States) Anthony Bartone (France) Aurélien Panis	(Germany) Marvin Dienst; Rinat Salikhov	Report
3	R1	(France) Magny-Cours	(Netherlands) #3 Mercedes-AMG Team Verstappen Racing	(Netherlands) #3 Mercedes-AMG Team Verstappen Racing	(Belgium) #10 Boutsen VDS	(Belgium) #30 Team WRT	(United States) #87 Winward Racing	Report
3	R1	(France) Magny-Cours	(Andorra) Jules Gounon (Spain) Daniel Juncadella	(Andorra) Jules Gounon (Spain) Daniel Juncadella	(Sweden) Robin Knutsson (Belgium) Gilles Magnus	(Belgium) Matisse Lismont (Argentina) Ignacio Montenegro	(Germany) Marvin Dienst; Rinat Salikhov	Report
3	R2	(France) Magny-Cours	(Belgium) #7 Comtoyou Racing	(Germany) #80 Lionspeed GP	(France) #111 CSA Racing	(Belgium) #30 Team WRT	(United Kingdom) #991 Paradine Competition	Report
3	R2	(France) Magny-Cours	(Belgium) Kobe Pauwels (Denmark) Nicki Thiim	(Denmark) Bastian Buus (Switzerland) Ricardo Feller	(United Kingdom) James Kell (France) Arthur Rougier	(Belgium) Matisse Lismont (Argentina) Ignacio Montenegro	(Brazil) Augusto Farfus (United Kingdom) Darren Leung	Report
4	R1	(Netherlands) Zandvoort	(Belgium) #2 Boutsen VDS	(United Kingdom) #58 Garage 59	(United Kingdom) #58 Garage 59	(Belgium) #30 Team WRT	(United Kingdom) #93 Ziggo Sport Tempesta Racing	Report
4	R1	(Netherlands) Zandvoort	(France) Dorian Boccolacci (Netherlands) Morris Schuring	(United Kingdom) Tom Fleming (Monaco) Louis Prette	(United Kingdom) Tom Fleming (Monaco) Louis Prette	(Belgium) Matisse Lismont (Argentina) Ignacio Montenegro	(Italy) Eddie Cheever III (Republic of Ireland) Peter Dempsey	Report
4	R2	(Netherlands) Zandvoort	(Switzerland) #14 Emil Frey Racing	(Switzerland) #69 Emil Frey Racing	(Italy) #51 AF Corse	(Belgium) #21 Comtoyou Racing	(United Kingdom) #93 Ziggo Sport Tempesta Racing	Report
4	R2	(Netherlands) Zandvoort	(Italy) Matteo Cairoli (Finland) Konsta Lappalainen	(United Kingdom) Ben Green (Netherlands) Thierry Vermeulen	(Italy) Tommaso Mosca (Peru) Matías Zagazeta	(France) Arthur Dorison (Sweden) Oliver Söderström	(Italy) Eddie Cheever III (Republic of Ireland) Peter Dempsey	Report
5	R1	(Spain) Barcelona	(Germany) #80 Lionspeed GP	(Germany) #99 Tresor Attempto Racing	(Germany) #99 Tresor Attempto Racing	(United Kingdom) #5 Optimum Motorsport	(United Kingdom) #93 Ziggo Sport Tempesta Racing	Report
5	R1	(Spain) Barcelona	(Denmark) Bastian Buus (Switzerland) Ricardo Feller	(Germany) Alex Aka (Luxembourg) Dylan Pereira	(Germany) Alex Aka (Luxembourg) Dylan Pereira	(Portugal) Guilherme Oliveira (United Kingdom) Mikey Porter	(Italy) Eddie Cheever III (Republic of Ireland) Peter Dempsey	Report
5	R2	(Spain) Barcelona	(Switzerland) #69 Emil Frey Racing (Note: Qualifying cancelled due to extreme weather alert, the grid was instead determined by the fastest times from FP2 of each driver who did not qualify for race 1.)	(Switzerland) #69 Emil Frey Racing	(Italy) #163 VSR	(Germany) #66 Tresor Attempto Racing	(United Kingdom) #93 Ziggo Sport Tempesta Racing	Report
5	R2	(Spain) Barcelona	(United Kingdom) Ben Green (Netherlands) Thierry Vermeulen	(United Kingdom) Ben Green (Netherlands) Thierry Vermeulen	(Italy) Mattia Michelotto (Italy) Loris Spinelli	(Italy) Andrea Frassineti (Israel) Ariel Levi	(Italy) Eddie Cheever III (Republic of Ireland) Peter Dempsey	Report

== Championship standings ==
Scoring system

Championship points are awarded for the first ten positions in each race. The pole-sitter also receives one point.

Position	1st	2nd	3rd	4th	5th	6th	7th	8th	9th	10th	Pole
Points	16.5	12	9.5	7.5	6	4	3	2	1	0.5	1

=== Drivers' championships ===
==== Overall ====
Pos.	Drivers	Team	BRH (United Kingdom)		MIS (Italy)		MAG (France)		ZAN (Netherlands)		CAT (Spain)		Points
1	(Denmark) Bastian Buus (Switzerland) Ricardo Feller	(Germany) Lionspeed GP	Ret^{P}	1^{P}	2	20	11	1^{F}	23	2	2^{P}	36	72
2	(Monaco) Arthur Leclerc (France) Thomas Neubauer	(Italy) AF Corse	1	15	9	6	2	4	6	5	Ret	2	65.5
3	(Spain) Daniel Juncadella	(Netherlands) Mercedes-AMG Team Verstappen Racing	12	2	Ret	2^{P}	1^{P}	8	5^{F}	9	12	5	59
4	(United Kingdom) Ben Green (Netherlands) Thierry Vermeulen	(Switzerland) Emil Frey Racing	10	11	4	5	15	Ret	3	1	Ret	1^{P}	56.5
5	(South Africa) Kelvin van der Linde (Belgium) Charles Weerts	(Belgium) Team WRT	3	6	1^{F}	1	7	Ret	Ret	15	10	6	55
6	(Austria) Lucas Auer (Germany) Maro Engel	(United States) Winward Racing	6^{F}	3	3	3^{F}	4	19	13	8	7	11	45.5
7	(Germany) Max Hesse (Italy) Valentino Rossi	(Belgium) Team WRT	14	4	6^{P}	4	6	9	12	4	16	38	33.5
8	(Andorra) Jules Gounon	(Netherlands) Mercedes-AMG Team Verstappen Racing			Ret	2^{P}	1^{P}	8					32.5
9	(France) Dorian Boccolacci	(Belgium) Boutsen VDS	2	12^{F}	27	18	9	12	2^{P}	11	6^{F}	Ret	30.5
10	(United Kingdom) Chris Lulham	(Netherlands) Mercedes-AMG Team Verstappen Racing	12	2					5^{F}	9	12	5	26.5
11	(United Kingdom) Dean MacDonald	(United Kingdom) Garage 59	11	5	13	7	5	7	20	13	4	9	26.5
12	(Germany) Alex Aka (Luxembourg) Dylan Pereira	(Germany) Tresor Attempto Racing	Ret	Ret	5	8	14	37	14	14	1	10	25
13	(Netherlands) Morris Schuring	(Belgium) Boutsen VDS	2	12^{F}	27	18			2^{P}	11			25
14	(Germany) Luca Engstler (Switzerland) Patric Niederhauser	(Germany) Rutronik Racing	20	18	11	26	41	3	22	7	3	Ret	22
15	(United Kingdom) Tom Fleming (Monaco) Louis Prette	(United Kingdom) Garage 59	8	Ret	12	9	12	16	1	25	24	35^{F}	19.5
16	(Germany) Marvin Kirchhöfer	(United Kingdom) Garage 59	11	5	13	7	5	7	20	13			18
17	(Italy) Matteo Cairoli (Finland) Konsta Lappalainen	(Switzerland) Emil Frey Racing	5	9	22	Ret	28	17	16	3^{PF}	Ret	13	17.5
18	(Belgium) Matisse Lismont (Argentina) Ignacio Montenegro	(Belgium) Team WRT	15	8	10	17	13	2	8	16	33	Ret	17.5
19	(Belgium) Kobe Pauwels (Denmark) Nicki Thiim	(Belgium) Comtoyou Racing	9	14	16	Ret	3^{F}	18^{P}	9	Ret	18	7	16.5
20	(Belgium) Amaury Cordeel (South Africa) Jordan Pepper	(Belgium) Team WRT	4	7	7	10	20	11	Ret	Ret	11	8	16
21	(Italy) Tommaso Mosca (Peru) Matías Zagazeta	(Italy) AF Corse	7	19	15	14	10	10	7	6	30	17	13
22	(Italy) Andrea Frassineti (Israel) Ariel Levi	(Germany) Tresor Attempto Racing	22	31	Ret	WD	16	21	15	22	Ret	3	9.5
23	(Italy) Mattia Michelotto (Italy) Loris Spinelli	(Italy) VSR	28	23	36	12	22	Ret	10	17	15	4	8.5
24	(Germany) Christopher Haase (Austria) Simon Reicher	(Austria) Eastalent Racing	23	17	8	35	Ret	5	21	Ret	14	14	8
25	(Italy) Eddie Cheever III (Republic of Ireland) Peter Dempsey	(United Kingdom) Ziggo Sport – Tempesta Racing			35	30	18	28	17	21	5	20	6
26	(United Kingdom) James Kell (France) Arthur Rougier	(France) CSA Racing	21	25	18	15	19	6	28	30	22	37	4.5
27	(Sweden) Robin Knutsson (Belgium) Gilles Magnus	(Belgium) Boutsen VDS	Ret	DNS	17	19	8	24	11	10	19	28	3
28	(United Kingdom) David Pittard (Netherlands) Jop Rappange	(Netherlands) KPX Motorsport	29	24	30	25	26	31	30	37	8	Ret	2
29	(Belgium) Alessio Picariello	(Belgium) Boutsen VDS					9	12					1
29	(Germany) Dennis Marschall	(Switzerland) Kessel Racing			24	34	23	Ret	38	27	9	21	1
30	(France) Romain Andriolo (France) Simon Gachet	(France) CSA Racing	27	10	41	11	30	14	Ret	24	13	16	0.5
—	(Denmark) Simon Birch	(Austria) Razoon – more than racing	30	28					4 (Note: Simon Birch entered as a guest entrant with and were ineligible for championship points.)	18			0
—	(France) Arthur Dorison (Sweden) Oliver Söderström	(Belgium) Comtoyou Racing	24	27	28	27	27	15	19	12	29	19	0
—	(Belgium) Jef Machiels (Belgium) Gilles Stadsbader	(Italy) AF Corse	25	16	20	21	Ret	34	32	20	23	12	0
—	(Portugal) Guilherme Oliveira (United Kingdom) Mikey Porter	(United Kingdom) Optimum Motorsport	13	13	29	33	42	13	25	29	21	18	0
—	(United States) Anthony Bartone (France) Aurélien Panis	(United States) GetSpeed Team Bartone Bros	17	29	19	13	25	20	36	26	34	22	0
—	(United Arab Emirates) Jamie Day (Ecuador) Mateo Villagomez	(Germany) Walkenhorst Motorsport	16	20	14	16	24	26	29	19	26	15	0
—	(Germany) Marvin Dienst; Rinat Salikhov	(United States) Winward Racing			23	24	17	36	24	34	17	23	0
—	(Brazil) Augusto Farfus (United Kingdom) Darren Leung	(United Kingdom) Paradine Competition			25	38	31	23	18	35	20	29	0
—	(France) Maxime Robin (France) Gaspard Simon	(Germany) Walkenhorst Motorsport	18	26	31	22	28	29	31	31	Ret	25	0
—	(United Kingdom) Alex Malykhin	(Lithuania) Pure Rxcing	19	21	34	28	35	Ret	37	33	Ret	Ret	0
—	(Slovenia) Alexey Nesov	(Lithuania) Pure Rxcing	19	21									0
—	(United Kingdom) Charles Dawson (United Kingdom) Kiern Jewiss	(Bahrain) 2 Seas Motorsport			26	31	21	25	26	23	35	30	0
—	(Luxembourg) Gabriel Rindone (Germany) Fabian Schiller	(United Arab Emirates) GetSpeed Team Dubai			21	36	28	32	34	40	32	31	0
—	(Thailand) Carl Bennett (Switzerland) Felix Hirsiger	(Italy) AF Corse	26	22	32	23	32	30	Ret	28	28	26	0
—	(Thailand) Tanart Sathienthirakul	(Italy) Dinamic GT	31	30	33	29	37	22	33	32	27	27	0
—	(Slovenia) Mark Kastelic	(Italy) Dinamic GT			33	29	37	22	33	32	27	27	0
—	(United States) Dustin Blattner	(Switzerland) Kessel Racing			24	34	23	Ret	38	27			0
—	(France) Loris Cabirou	(Italy) Dinamic GT	31	30	38	32	34	27	35	39	31	33	0
—	Dmitry Gvazava	(Italy) Dinamic GT			38	32	34	27	35	39	31	33	0
—	(Norway) Magnus Gustavsen	(Austria) Razoon – more than racing	30	28									0
—	(Italy) Riccardo Pera	(Lithuania) Pure Rxcing			34	28			37	33			0
—	(Italy) Felice Jelmini (Brazil) Marcelo Tomasoni	(Belgium) Comtoyou Racing			40	40	40	38	Ret	Ret	36	32	0
—	(Denmark) Sebastian Øgaard (Germany) Carrie Schreiner	(Germany) Tresor Attempto Racing			39	37	39	33	39	36	38	34	0
—	(Italy) David Fumanelli (Italy) Marco Pulcini	(Switzerland) Kessel Racing			37	39	33	35	40	38	37	WD	0
—	(Denmark) Mikkel O. Pedersen	(Lithuania) Pure Rxcing					35	Ret			Ret	Ret	0
—	(France) Michael Blanchemain (France) Jim Pla	(France) Saintéloc Racing					38	Ret					0
Guest drivers ineligible to score points
—	(United Kingdom) Joseph Loake	(United Kingdom) Garage 59									4	9	0
—	(Austria) Klaus Bachler	(Austria) Razoon – more than racing							4	18			0
—	(Germany) Sven Müller	(Belgium) Boutsen VDS									6^{F}	Ret	0
—	(Germany) Constantin Dressler	(Switzerland) Kessel Racing									9	21	0
—	(Belgium) Nicolas Baert	(Germany) Lionspeed GP							27	Ret	25	24	0
—	(Sweden) Gustav Bergström	(Germany) Lionspeed GP									25	24	0
—	(Netherlands) Flynt Schuring	(Germany) Lionspeed GP							27	Ret			0
Pos.	Drivers	Team	BRH (United Kingdom)		MIS (Italy)		MAG (France)		ZAN (Netherlands)		CAT (Spain)		Points

Key
Colour	Result
Gold	Race winner
Silver	2nd place
Bronze	3rd place
Green	Points finish
Blue	Non-points finish
Blue	Non-classified finish (NC)
Purple	Did not finish (Ret)
Black	Disqualified (DSQ)
Black	Excluded (EX)
White	Did not start (DNS)
White	Race cancelled (C)
White	Withdrew (WD)
Blank	Did not participate

P – Pole
F – Fastest Lap

==== Gold Cup ====
Pos.	Drivers	Team	BRH (United Kingdom)		MIS (Italy)		MAG (France)		ZAN (Netherlands)		CAT (Spain)		Points
1	(Italy) Tommaso Mosca (Peru) Matías Zagazeta	(Italy) AF Corse	7	19	15	14	10	10	7	6	30	17	106
2	(Germany) Alex Aka (Luxembourg) Dylan Pereira	(Germany) Tresor Attempto Racing	Ret^{P}	Ret	5^{P F}	8	14^{F}	37^{F}	14^{F}	14^{F}	1^{P F}	10	90.5
3	(United Kingdom) Tom Fleming (Monaco) Louis Prette	(United Kingdom) Garage 59	8	Ret	12	9^{F}	12	16	1^{P}	25^{P}	24	35^{F}	83.5
4	(France) Romain Andriolo (France) Simon Gachet	(France) CSA Racing	27	10^{F}	41	11	30	14	Ret	24	13	16	72
5	(Italy) Mattia Michelotto (Italy) Loris Spinelli	(Italy) VSR	28	23	36	12	22	Ret	10	17	15	4	71.5
6	(Sweden) Robin Knutsson (Belgium) Gilles Magnus	(Belgium) Boutsen VDS	Ret	DNS^{P}	17	19	8^{P}	24	11	10	19	28	66.5
7	(United Kingdom) James Kell (France) Arthur Rougier	(France) CSA Racing	21	25	18	15^{P}	19	6^{P}	28	30	22	37^{P}	65.5
8	(United Kingdom) David Pittard (Netherlands) Jop Rappange	(Netherlands) KPX Motorsport	29^{F}	24	30	25	26	31	30	37	8	Ret	43
Pos.	Drivers	Team	BRH (United Kingdom)		MIS (Italy)		MAG (France)		ZAN (Netherlands)		CAT (Spain)		Points

==== Silver Cup ====
Pos.	Drivers	Team	BRH (United Kingdom)		MIS (Italy)		MAG (France)		ZAN (Netherlands)		CAT (Spain)		Points
1	(Belgium) Matisse Lismont (Argentina) Ignacio Montenegro	(Belgium) Team WRT	15^{P}	8^{P}	10	17^{F}	13	2^{P F}	8^{P}	16	33^{F}	Ret	123
2	(United Arab Emirates) Jamie Day (Ecuador) Mateo Villagomez	(Germany) Walkenhorst Motorsport	16	20	14	16	24	26	39	19	26	15	88
3	(Portugal) Guilherme Oliveira (United Kingdom) Mikey Porter	(United Kingdom) Optimum Motorsport	13	13	29	33	42	13	25	29	21	18	79.5
4	(France) Arthur Dorison (Sweden) Oliver Söderström	(Belgium) Comtoyou Racing	24	27	28	27	27^{P}	15	19	12^{P}	29	19	67
5	(United States) Anthony Bartone (France) Aurélien Panis	(United States) GetSpeed Team Bartone Bros	17	29	19^{F}	13^{P}	25	20	36	26	34	22^{F}	62
6	(Belgium) Jef Machiels (Belgium) Gilles Stadsbader	(Italy) AF Corse	25	16	20	21	Ret	34	32	20	23	12	60.5
7	(Italy) Andrea Frassineti (Israel) Ariel Levi	(Germany) Tresor Attempto Racing	22	31	Ret^{P}	WD	16^{F}	21	15^{F}	22^{F}	Ret	3	56.5
8	(France) Maxime Robin (France) Gaspard Simon	(Germany) Walkenhorst Motorsport	18	26	31	22	28	29	31	31	Ret	25	33
9	(Thailand) Carl Bennett (Switzerland) Felix Hirsiger	(Italy) AF Corse	26	22	32	23	32	30	Ret	28	28^{P}	26	27.5
10	(Thailand) Tanart Sathienthirakul	(Italy) Dinamic GT	31	30	33	29	37	22	33	32	27	27	18.5
10	(Slovenia) Mark Kastelic	(Italy) Dinamic GT			33	29	37	22	33	32	27	27	18.5
11	(United Kingdom) Alex Malykhin	(Lithuania) Pure Rxcing	19	21^{F}	34	28	35	Ret	37	33	Ret	Ret	15.5
12	(Slovenia) Alexey Nesov	(Lithuania) Pure Rxcing	19	21^{F}									10.5
13	(Italy) Riccardo Pera	(Lithuania) Pure Rxcing			34	28			37	33			3
14	(Denmark) Mikkel O. Pedersen	(Lithuania) Pure Rxcing					35	Ret			Ret	Ret	2
15	(Denmark) Simon Birch (Norway) Magnus Gustavsen	(Austria) Razoon – more than racing	30^{F}	28									1
—	(France) Loris Cabirou	(Italy) Dinamic GT	31	30									0
Guest drivers ineligible to score points
—	(Belgium) Nicolas Baert	(Germany) Lionspeed GP							27	Ret	25	24^{P}	0
—	(Sweden) Gustav Bergström	(Germany) Lionspeed GP									25	24^{P}	0
—	(Netherlands) Flynt Schuring	(Germany) Lionspeed GP							27	Ret			0
Pos.	Drivers	Team	BRH (United Kingdom)		MIS (Italy)		MAG (France)		ZAN (Netherlands)		CAT (Spain)		Points

==== Bronze Cup ====
Pos.	Drivers	Team	MIS (Italy)		MAG (France)		ZAN (Netherlands)		CAT (Spain)		Points
1	(Italy) Eddie Cheever III (Republic of Ireland) Peter Dempsey	(United Kingdom) Ziggo Sport – Tempesta Racing	35	30	18	28^{P}	17^{P}	21	5^{F}	20^{P}	104
2	(Germany) Marvin Dienst; Rinat Salikhov	(United States) Winward Racing	23^{F}	24	17	36^{F}	24	34	17	23	83
3	(United Kingdom) Charles Dawson (United Kingdom) Kiern Jewiss	(Bahrain) 2 Seas Motorsport	26	31^{P}	21^{P F}	25	26	23^{P}	35^{P}	30	69.5
4	(Brazil) Augusto Farfus (United Kingdom) Darren Leung	(United Kingdom) Paradine Competition	25	38	31	23	18	35	20	29	65
5	(Germany) Dennis Marschall	(Switzerland) Kessel Racing	24	34	23	Ret	38^{F}	27^{F}	9	21^{F}	59.5
6	(Luxembourg) Gabriel Rindone (Germany) Fabian Schiller	(United Arab Emirates) GetSpeed Team Dubai	21^{P}	36^{F}	36	32	34	40	32	31	46
7	(France) Loris Cabirou; Dmitry Gvazava	(Italy) Dinamic GT	38	32	34	27	35	39	31	33	36.5
8	(United States) Dustin Blattner	(Switzerland) Kessel Racing	24	34	23	Ret	38^{F}	27^{F}			35.5
9	(Denmark) Sebastian Øgaard (Germany) Carrie Schreiner	(Germany) Tresor Attempto Racing	39	37	39	33	39	36	38	34	17
10	(Italy) David Fumanelli (Italy) Marco Pulcini	(Switzerland) Kessel Racing	37	39	33	35	40	38	37	WD	16.5
11	(Italy) Felice Jelmini (Brazil) Marcelo Tomasoni	(Belgium) Comtoyou Racing	40	40	40	38	Ret	Ret	36	32	7
12	(France) Michael Blanchemain (France) Jim Pla	(France) Saintéloc Racing			38	Ret					1
Guest drivers ineligible to score points
—	(Germany) Constantin Dressler	(Switzerland) Kessel Racing							9	21^{F}	0
Pos.	Drivers	Team	MIS (Italy)		MAG (France)		ZAN (Netherlands)		CAT (Spain)		Points

=== Teams' championships ===
==== Overall ====
Pos.	Team	Manufacturer	BRH (United Kingdom)		MIS (Italy)		MAG (France)		ZAN (Netherlands)	CAT (Spain)	Points
1	(Belgium) Team WRT	BMW	3	4	1^{P F}	1	6	2			67
2	(Germany) Lionspeed GP	Porsche	Ret^{P}	1^{P}	2	20	11	1^{F}			49
3	(Bahrain) 2 Seas Motorsport (Netherlands) Mercedes-AMG Team Verstappen Racing	Mercedes-AMG	12	2	26	2^{P}	1^{P}	8			46.5
4	(Italy) AF Corse	Ferrari	1	15	9	6	2	4			45
5	(United States) Winward Racing	Mercedes-AMG	6^{F}	3	3	3^{F}	4	19			42
6	(Switzerland) Emil Frey Racing	Ferrari	5	9	4	5	15	17			27
7	(United Kingdom) Garage 59	McLaren	8	5	12	7	5	7			24
8	(Belgium) Boutsen VDS	Porsche	2	12^{F}	17	18	8	12			18
9	(Belgium) Comtoyou Racing	Aston Martin	9	14	16	27	3^{F}	15^{P}			14
10	(Germany) Rutronik Racing	Lamborghini	20	18	11	26	41	3			11.5
11	(Austria) Eastalent Racing	Audi	23	17	8	35	Ret	5			10
12	(Germany) Tressor Attempto Racing	Audi	22	31	5	8	14	21			10
13	(France) CSA Racing	McLaren	21	10	18	11	19	6			9
14	(United Kingdom) Optimum Motorsport	McLaren	13	13	29	33	42	13			2.5
15	(Italy) VSR	Lamborghini	28	23	36	12	22	Ret			1
16	(Germany) Walkenhorst Motorsport	Aston Martin	16	20	14	16	24	26			1
17	(United States) GetSpeed Team Bartone Bros	Mercedes-AMG	17	29	19	13	25	20			0.5
—	(Lithuania) Pure Rxcing	Porsche	19	21	34	28	35	Ret			0
—	(Netherlands) KPX Motorsport	BMW	29	24	30	25	26	31			0
—	(Switzerland) Kessel Racing	Ferrari			24	34	23	35			0
—	(United Kingdom) Paradine Competition	BMW			25	38	31	23			0
—	(Italy) Dinamic GT	Porsche	31	30	33	29	34	22			0
—	(Austria) Razoon – more than racing	Porsche	31	30							0
—	(United Kingdom) Ziggo Sport – Tempesta Racing	Porsche			35	30	18	28			0
—	(France) Saintéloc Racing	Audi					38	Ret			0
Pos.	Team	Manufacturer	BRH (United Kingdom)		MIS (Italy)		MAG (France)		ZAN (Netherlands)	CAT (Spain)	Points

==== Gold Cup ====
Pos.	Team	Manufacturer	BRH (United Kingdom)		MIS (Italy)		MAG (France)		ZAN (Netherlands)	CAT (Spain)	Points
1	(Italy) AF Corse	Ferrari	7	19	15	14	10	10			68
2	(France) CSA Racing	McLaren	21	10^{F}	18	11^{P}	19	6^{P}			66
3	(United Kingdom) Garage 59	McLaren	8	Ret	12	9^{F}	12	16			55
4	(Germany) Tressor Attempto Racing	Audi	Ret^{P}	Ret	5^{PF}	8	14^{F}	37^{F}			46.5
5	(Belgium) Boutsen VDS	Porsche	Ret	DNS^{P}	17	19	8^{P}	24			37.5
6	(Italy) VSR	Lamborghini	28	23	36	12	22	Ret			31.5
7	(Netherlands) KPX Motorsport	BMW	29^{F}	24	30	25	26	31			29.5
Pos.	Team	Manufacturer	BRH (United Kingdom)		MIS (Italy)		MAG (France)		ZAN (Netherlands)	CAT (Spain)	Points

==== Silver Cup ====
Pos.	Team	Manufacturer	BRH (United Kingdom)		MIS (Italy)		MAG (France)		ZAN (Netherlands)	CAT (Spain)	Points
1	(Belgium) Team WRT	BMW	15^{P}	8^{P}	10	17^{F}	13	2^{P F}			90.5
2	(Germany) Walkenhorst Motorsport	Aston Martin	16	20	14	16	24	26			53.5
3	(United States) GetSpeed Team Bartone Bros	Mercedes-AMG	17	29	19^{F}	13^{P}	25	20			51.5
4	(United Kingdom) Optimum Motorsport	McLaren	13	13	29	33	42	13			47.5
5	(Belgium) Comtoyou Racing	Aston Martin	24	27	28	27	27^{P}	15			35.5
6	(Italy) AF Corse	Ferrari	25	16	20	21	32	30			32.5
7	(Germany) Tressor Attempto Racing	Audi	22	31	Ret^{P}	WD	16^{F}	21			23.5
8	(Lithuania) Pure Rxcing	Porsche	19	21^{F}	34	28	35	Ret			21
9	(Italy) Dinamic GT	Porsche	31	30	33	29	37	22			13.5
10	(Austria) Razoon – more than racing	Porsche	30^{F}	28							4
Pos.	Team	Manufacturer	BRH (United Kingdom)		MIS (Italy)		MAG (France)		ZAN (Netherlands)	CAT (Spain)	Points

==== Bronze Cup ====
Pos.	Team	Manufacturer	MIS (Italy)		MAG (France)		ZAN (Netherlands)	CAT (Spain)	Points
1	(United States) Winward Racing	Mercedes-AMG	23^{F}	24	17	36 ^{F}			47
2	(Bahrain) 2 Seas Motorsport	Mercedes-AMG	25	31^{P}	21^{P F}	25			39
3	(United Kingdom) Ziggo Sport – Tempesta Racing	Porsche	35	20	18	28^{P}			36.5
4	(United Kingdom) Paradine Competition	BMW	25	38	31	23			32
5	(United Arab Emirates) GetSpeed Team Dubai	Mercedes-AMG	21^{P}	36^{F}	36	32			30.5
6	(Switzerland) Kessel Racing	Ferrari	24	34	23	35			26
7	(Italy) Dinamic GT	Porsche	38	32	34	27			24
8	(Germany) Tresor Attempto Racing	Audi	39	37	39	33			10
9	(Belgium) Comtoyou Racing	Aston Martin	40	40	40	38			3.5
10	(France) Saintéloc Racing	Audi			38	Ret			2
Pos.	Team	Manufacturer	MIS (Italy)		MAG (France)		ZAN (Netherlands)	CAT (Spain)	Points

== See also ==
- 2026 British GT Championship
- 2026 GT World Challenge Europe
- 2026 GT World Challenge Europe Endurance Cup
- 2026 GT World Challenge Asia
- 2026 GT World Challenge America
- 2026 GT World Challenge Australia
- 2026 Intercontinental GT Challenge
- 2026 GT3 Revival Series
