= Alex Malykhin =

Belarusian racing driver (born 1987)

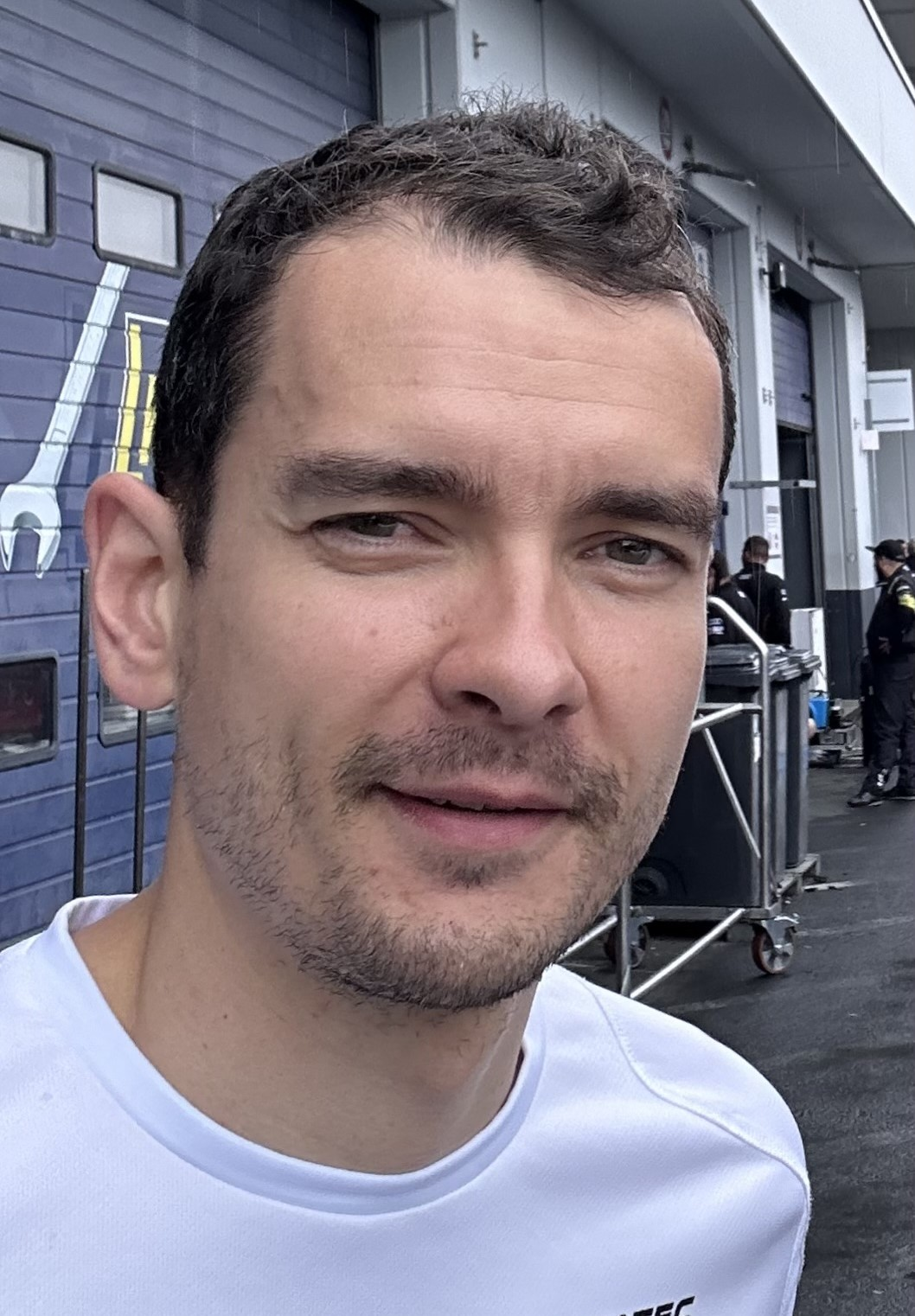
- Malykhin 2024
- Nationality: (Belarus) Belarusian (Saint Kitts and Nevis) Kittitian (United Kingdom) British (Note: Malykhin is Belarusian-Kittitian, but he competes under a British licence as Belarusian national emblems were banned by the FIA following the Russian invasion of Ukraine.)
- Born: Aliaksandr Malykhin; 17 August 1987 (age 39) Belarusian SSR, Soviet Union

European Le Mans Series
- Categorisation: FIA Bronze (2021–2024); FIA Silver (2025–)
- Years active: 2025
- Teams: CLX - Pure Rxcing
- Car number: 37
- Starts: 3 (3 entries)
- Wins: 0
- Podiums: 0
- Poles: 0
- Fastest laps: 0

Previous series
- 2024: FIA World Endurance Championship

Championship titles
- 2022 2023 2023 2023–24 2024: British GT Championship GT3 Silver-Am; GT World Challenge Europe Bronze Cup; GT World Challenge Europe Sprint Cup Bronze Cup; Asian Le Mans Series GT; FIA World Endurance Championship LMGT3

Aliaksandr Malykhin (Belarusian: Аляксандр Малыхін; Russian: Александр Малыхин; born 17 August 1987), also known as Alexander Malykhin or simply Alex Malykhin, is a Belarusian and Kittitian racing driver who currently competes in the GT World Challenge Europe for Pure Rxcing under a British racing licence. He is the 2023 GT World Challenge Europe Bronze Cup champion, 2023–24 Asian Le Mans Series GT champion and 2024 FIA World Endurance Championship LMGT3 champion.

== Career ==
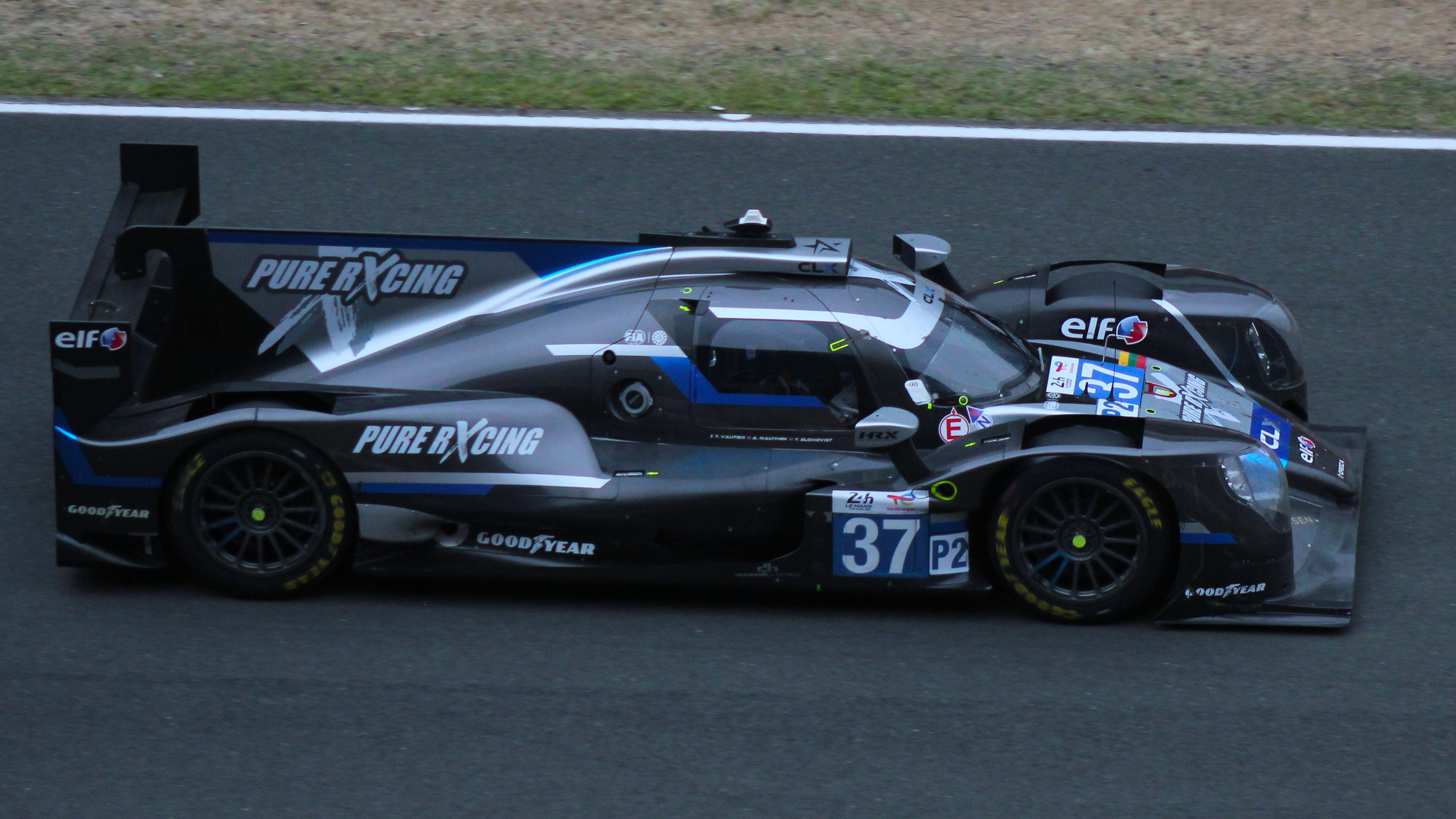
Malykhin's No. 37 car at the 2025 24 Hours of Le Mans

In 2022, Malykhin competed in the British GT Championship for Allied Racing, winning the GT3 Silver-Am Championship alongside James Dorlin. In the same year, he also competed with the same team in the GT World Challenge Europe and GT World Challenge Europe Endurance Cup, as well as the first round of the GT World Challenge Europe Sprint Cup. In 2023, Malykhin competed in the GTWCE, Endurance Cup and the Sprint Cup, all for Pure Rxcing. He would win the championship in the Bronze Cup in the GTWCE and Sprint Cup.

Malykhin competed in the 2023–24 Asian Le Mans Series in the GT category, winning the championship alongside Klaus Bachler and Joel Sturm. Malykhin, Bachler and Sturm would also enter the 2024 FIA World Endurance Championship in the LMGT3 category. The trio began their season by winning the Qatar 1812 km race, with Malykhin's pace compared to other bronze drivers being credited as a winning factor by his teammates.

During the same year, Malykhin would also join his WEC teammates in the GTWC Endurance Cup, competing in the Pro class. They finished eighth at the season opener in Le Castellet.

== Racing record ==
=== Racing career summary ===
Season	Series	Team	Races	Wins	Poles	F/Laps	Podiums	Points	Position
2022	British GT Championship - GT3	Redline Racing	8	0	0	0	0	82	6th
2022	British GT Championship - GT3 Silver-Am	Redline Racing	8	3	0	0	7	193	**1st**
2022	GT World Challenge Europe Endurance Cup	Barwell Motorsport	1	0	0	0	0	0	NC
2022	GT World Challenge Europe Endurance Cup	Allied-Racing	4	0	0	0	0	0	NC
2022	GT World Challenge Europe Endurance Cup - Gold	Barwell Motorsport	1	0	0	0	0	18	20th
2022	GT World Challenge Europe Endurance Cup - Gold	Allied-Racing	4	0	0	1	0	18	20th
2022	GT World Challenge Europe Sprint Cup	Barwell Motorsport	0	0	0	0	0	0	NC
2022	GT World Challenge Europe Sprint Cup - Bronze	Barwell Motorsport	0	0	1	0	0	1	7th
2023	Asian Le Mans Series - GT	Herberth Motorsport	4	0	0	0	1	31	4th
2023	GT World Challenge Europe Endurance Cup	Pure Rxcing	5	0	0	0	0	0	NC
2023	GT World Challenge Europe Endurance Cup - Bronze	Pure Rxcing	5	1	1	0	2	69	5th
2023	GT World Challenge Europe Sprint Cup	Pure Rxcing	6	0	0	0	0	0	NC
2023	GT World Challenge Europe Sprint Cup - Bronze	Pure Rxcing	6	1	0	0	6	71.5	**1st**
2023-24	Asian Le Mans Series - GT	Pure Rxcing	5	2	0	1	3	76	**1st**
2024	FIA World Endurance Championship - LMGT3	Manthey PureRxcing	8	2	0	0	6	139	**1st**
2024	24 Hours of Le Mans - LMGT3	Manthey PureRxcing	1	0	0	0	0	N/A	14th
2024	GT World Challenge Europe Endurance Cup	Pure Rxcing	5	0	0	0	0	12	19th
2024-25	Asian Le Mans Series - LMP2	Pure Rxcing	6	0	0	3	1	37	7th
2025	European Le Mans Series - LMP2	CLX – Pure Rxcing	5	0	0	0	0	15	13th
2025	24 Hours of Le Mans - LMP2	CLX – Pure Rxcing	1	0	0	0	0	N/A	14th
2025	GT World Challenge Europe Endurance Cup	Pure Rxcing	5	0	0	0	0	0	NC
2025-26	24H Series Middle East - GT3	Pure Rxcing							
2026	GT World Challenge Europe Endurance Cup	Pure Rxcing	5	0	0	0	0	0	NC
2026	GT World Challenge Europe Endurance Cup - Silver	Pure Rxcing	5	1	0	0	1	49	5th
2026	GT World Challenge Europe Sprint Cup	Pure Rxcing	10	0	0	0	0	0	NC
2026	GT World Challenge Europe Sprint Cup - Silver	Pure Rxcing	10	0	0	1	0	15.5	11th
2026	ADAC GT Masters	Pure Rxcing	1	0	0	0	0	0	NC†

† As Malykhin was a guest driver, he was ineligible to score points.

=== Complete GT World Challenge Europe results ===
==== GT World Challenge Europe Endurance Cup ====
(key) (Races in bold indicate pole position) (Races in italics indicate fastest lap)

Year	Team	Car	Class	1	2	3	4	5	6	7	Pos.	Points
2022	Barwell Motorsport	Lamborghini Huracán GT3 Evo	Gold	IMO; 25							20th	18
2022	Allied Racing	Porsche 911 GT3 R	Gold		LEC; 30	SPA; 6H; Ret	SPA; 12H; Ret	SPA; 24H; Ret	HOC; 36		20th	18
2022	Allied Racing	Porsche 911 GT3 R	Pro-Am							CAT; 34	12th	18
2023	Pure Rxcing	Porsche 911 GT3 R (992)	Bronze	MNZ; 15	LEC; Ret	SPA; 6H; 25	SPA; 12H; 21	SPA; 24H; 15	NÜR; 26	**CAT**; Ret	5th	69
2024	Pure Rxcing	Porsche 911 GT3 R (992)	Pro	LEC; 8	SPA; 6H; 11	SPA; 12H; 6	SPA; 24H; Ret	NÜR; 20	MNZ; 8	JED; 14	19th	12
2025	Pure Rxcing	Porsche 911 GT3 R (992)	Pro	LEC; 30	MNZ; 11	SPA; 6H; 63	SPA; 12H; 64†	SPA; 24H; Ret	NÜR; 11	CAT; 11	NC	0
2026	Pure Rxcing	Porsche 911 GT3 R (992.2)	Silver	LEC; 17	MNZ; 37†	SPA; 6H; 31	SPA; 12H; 58†	SPA; 24H; Ret	NÜR; 22	ALG; Ret	5th	49

==== GT World Challenge Europe Sprint Cup ====
(key) (Races in bold indicate pole position) (Races in italics indicate fastest lap)

Year	Team	Car	Class	1	2	3	4	5	6	7	8	9	10	Pos.	Points
2022	Barwell Motorsport	Lamborghini Huracán GT3 Evo	Pro-Am	BRH; 1 DNS	**BRH**; **2** DNS	MAG; 1	MAG; 2	ZAN; 1	ZAN; 2	MIS; 1	MIS; 2	VAL; 1	VAL; 2	7th	1
2023	Pure Rxcing	Porsche 911 GT3 R (992)	Bronze	MIS; 1; 21	MIS; 2; 21	HOC; 1; 20	HOC; 2; 22	VAL; 1; 19	VAL; 2; 19					1st	71.5
2026	Pure Rxcing	Porsche 911 GT3 R (992.2)	Silver	BRH; 1; 19	BRH; 2; 21	MIS; 1; 34	MIS; 2; 28	MAG; 1; 35	MAG; 2 Ret	ZAN; 1; 37	ZAN; 2; 33	CAT; 1 Ret	CAT; 2 Ret	11th	15.5

=== Complete Asian Le Mans Series results ===
(key) (Races in bold indicate pole position) (Races in italics indicate fastest lap)

Year	Team	Class	Car	Engine	1	2	3	4	5	6	Pos.	Points
2023	Herberth Motorsport	GT	Porsche 911 GT3 R	Porsche 4.0 L Flat-6	DUB; 1; 4	DUB; 2; 10	ABU; 1; 2	ABU; 2; 15			4th	31
2023-24	Pure Rxcing	GT	Porsche 911 GT3 R (992)	Porsche 4.0 L Flat-6	SEP; 1; 6	SEP; 2; 1	DUB; 1	ABU; 1 Ret	ABU; 2; 2		1st	76
2024–25	Pure Rxcing	LMP2	Oreca 07	Gibson GK428 4.2 L V8	SEP; 1; 3	SEP; 2; 8	DUB; 1; 8	DUB; 2; 8	ABU; 1; 7	ABU; 2; 8	7th	37

=== Complete FIA World Endurance Championship results ===
Year	Entrant	Class	Car	Engine	1	2	3	4	5	6	7	8	Pos.	Points
2024	Manthey Pure Rxcing	LMGT3	Porsche 911 GT3 R (992)	Porsche 4.2 L Flat-6	QAT; 1	**IMO**; 3	SPA; 2	**LMS**; 10	SÃO; 1	COA; 2	FUJ; 2	BHR; 9	1st	139

=== Complete 24 Hours of Le Mans results ===
Year	Team	Co-Drivers	Car	Class	Laps	Pos.	Class Pos.
2024	(Lithuania) Manthey PureRxcing	(Austria) Klaus Bachler (Germany) Joel Sturm	Porsche 911 GT3 R (992)	LMGT3	273	41st	14th
2025	(Lithuania) CLX – Pure Rxcing	(United Kingdom) Tom Blomqvist (France) Tristan Vautier	Oreca 07-Gibson	LMP2	358	32nd	14th

=== Complete European Le Mans Series results ===
(key) (Races in bold indicate pole position; results in italics indicate fastest lap)

Year	Entrant	Class	Chassis	Engine	1	2	3	4	5	6	Rank	Points
2025	CLX – Pure Rxcing	LMP2	Oreca 07	Gibson GK428 4.2 L V8	CAT; 4	LEC; Ret	IMO; 10	SPA; 9	SIL; Ret	ALG	13th	15
