= Pure Rxcing =

Lithuanian sports car racing team

(Lithuania) Pure Rxcing
- Founded: 2022
- Founder(s): Edgar Kochanovskij (owner)
- Base: Vilnius, Lithuania
- Team principal(s): Edgar Kochanovskij
- Current series: Asian Le Mans Series; European Le Mans Series; FIA World Endurance Championship; GT World Challenge Europe
- Former series: Middle East Trophy
- Current drivers: FIA World Endurance Championship: 92. (Austria) Klaus Bachler (Saint Kitts and Nevis) Alex Malykhin (Germany) Joel Sturm; Asian Le Mans Series: 91. (Switzerland) Louis Delétraz (United Kingdom) Harry King (Saint Kitts and Nevis) Alex Malykhin
- Noted drivers: (United Kingdom) Harry King (Germany) Sven Müller (Turkey) Ayhancan Güven (Germany) Marco Seefried
- Teams' Championships: FIA World Endurance Championship: 2024 (LMGT3); Asian Le Mans Series: 2023–24 (LMGT3)
- Drivers' Championships: FIA World Endurance Championship: 2024: Klaus Bachler, Alex Malykhin, Joel Sturm (LMGT3); Asian Le Mans Series: 2023–24: Klaus Bachler, Alex Malykhin, Joel Sturm (LMGT3)

Pure Rxcing (pronounced Pure Racing) is a Lithuanian sports car racing team that competes in LMP2 and GT3. Founded in 2022 by race mechanic and engineer Edgar Kochanovskij, it is the inaugural champion of the FIA World Endurance Championship's LMGT3 category.

== History ==
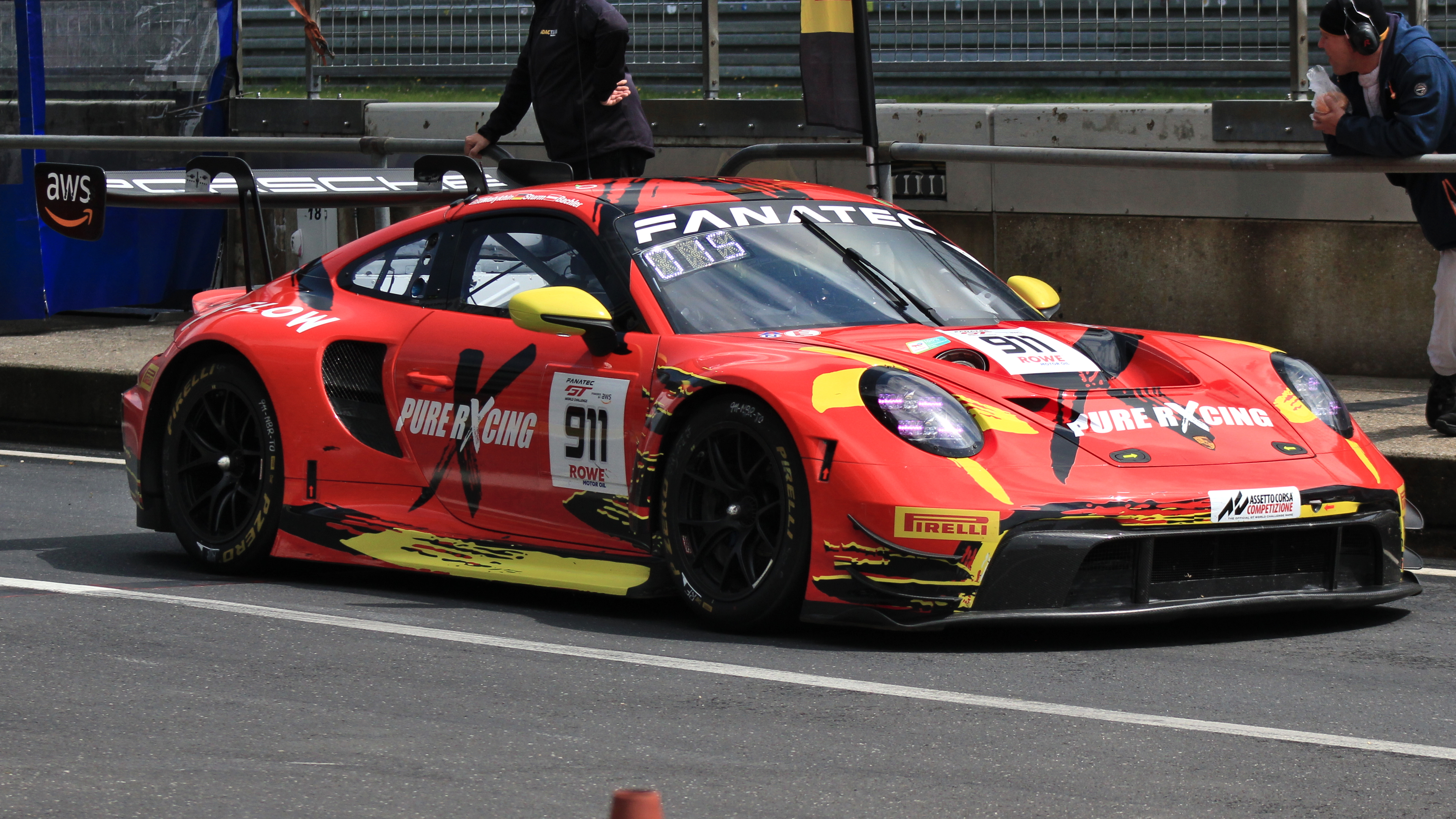
Pure Rxcing's Porsche 911 GT3 R (992) at the Nürburgring

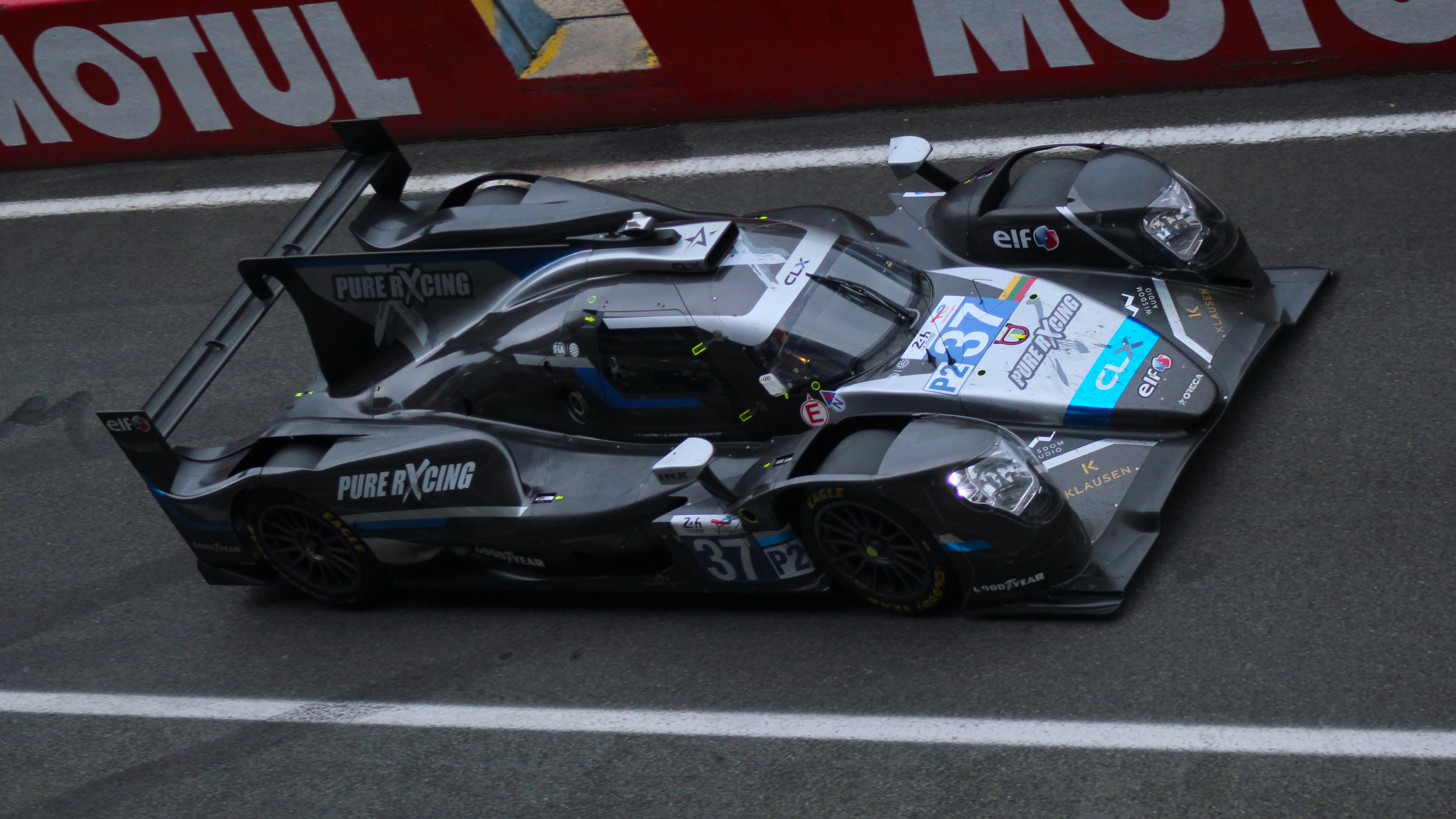
CLX – Pure Rxcing's Oreca 07 at the 2025 24 Hours of Le Mans

Having worked as a mechanic and engineer in motorsport for several years, Edgar Kochanovskij formed his own racing team, Pure Rxcing, in late 2022. The team made its competitive debut in the 2022–23 Middle East Trophy at the 2023 6 Hours of Abu Dhabi.

=== GT World Challenge Europe ===
==== 2023 ====
In 2023, Pure Rxcing entered the GT World Challenge Europe fielding the No. 911 Porsche 911 GT3 R (992) with support from German squad Herberth Motorsport in the Bronze Cup class. Alex Malykhin would serve as the team's bronze-graded driver, being joined by Ayhancan Güven for the Sprint Cup, Klaus Bachler and Joel Sturm in the Endurance Cup and Marco Seefried for the 24 Hours of Spa. The team would win twice, including their debut race at Monza, and Malykhin was crowned Bronze Cup champion.

==== 2024 ====
Pure Rxcing returned to the Endurance Cup in 2024 with an unchanged car and lineup, but would instead take on the Pro class, with Kochanovskij stating they had "nothing more to achieve" in Bronze.

=== Asian Le Mans Series ===
==== 2023–24 ====
For the winter campaign following its maiden season, Pure Rxcing pursued the Asian Le Mans Series, continuing the collaboration with Herberth and Porsche. Bachler, Malykhin and Sturm had a successful season with two wins and three podiums, which ultimately gave them the championship ahead of Triple Eight JMR by two points.

==== 2024–25 ====
In the wake of his FIA WEC successes, Alex Malykhin was upgraded from bronze to silver rating by the FIA, which led Pure Rxcing to switch focus to LMP2. The team partnered up with TF Sport for a go at the Asian Le Mans Series, fielding the No. 91 Oreca 07 for Malykhin, Louis Delétraz and Harry King.

=== FIA World Endurance Championship ===
==== 2024 ====
In January 2024, the team announced that they would compete in the FIA World Endurance Championship's new LMGT3 class. Pure Rxcing would field the No. 92 Porsche 911 GT3 R (992) with technical support from Manthey Racing, signing usual trio Klaus Bachler, Alex Malykhin, and Joel Sturm to drive the car for the full season. Pure Rxcing would have a historic season with two wins and six podiums to win the championship in their debut season.

== Racing record ==
=== GT World Challenge Europe ===
==== GT World Challenge Europe Sprint Cup ====
(key) (Races in bold indicate pole position; races in italics indicate fastest lap)

Year	Entrant	Class	No	Chassis	Engine	Drivers	1	2	3	4	5	6	Pos.	Pts
2023	(Lithuania) Pure Rxcing	Bronze	911	Porsche 911 GT3 R (992)	Porsche M97/80 4.2 L Flat-6	(Saint Kitts and Nevis) Alex Malykhin (Turkey) Ayhancan Güven 1, 3 (Austria) Klaus Bachler 2	MIS; 1; 21	MIS; 2; 21	HOC; 1; 20	HOC; 2; 22	VAL; 1; 19	VAL; 2; 19	1st	71.5

==== GT World Challenge Europe Endurance Cup ====
(key) (Races in bold indicate pole position; races in italics indicate fastest lap)

Year	Entrant	Class	No	Chassis	Engine	Drivers	1	2	3	4	5	6	7	Pos.	Pts
2023	(Lithuania) Pure Rxcing	Bronze	911	Porsche 911 GT3 R (992)	Porsche M97/80 4.2 L Flat-6	(Austria) Klaus Bachler (Saint Kitts and Nevis) Alex Malykhin (Germany) Joel Sturm (Germany) Marco Seefried 3	MNZ; 15	LEC; Ret	SPA; 6H; 25	SPA; 12H; 21	SPA; 24H; 15	NÜR; 26	**CAT**; Ret	5th	69
2024	(Lithuania) Pure Rxcing	Pro	911	Porsche 911 GT3 R (992)	Porsche M97/80 4.2 L Flat-6	(Austria) Klaus Bachler (Saint Kitts and Nevis) Alex Malykhin (Germany) Joel Sturm	LEC; 8	SPA; 6H; 11	SPA; 12H; 6	SPA; 24H; Ret	NÜR; 20	MNZ; 8	JED; 14	19th	12
2025	(Lithuania) Pure Rxcing	Pro	911	Porsche 911 GT3 R (992)	Porsche M97/80 4.2 L Flat-6	(Austria) Richard Lietz (Saint Kitts and Nevis) Alex Malykhin (Austria) Thomas Preining	LEC; 30	MNZ; 11	SPA; 6H; 63	SPA; 12H; 64†	SPA; 24H; Ret	NÜR; 11	CAT; 11	NC	0

=== Asian Le Mans Series ===
(key) (Races in bold indicate pole position; races in italics indicate fastest lap)

Year	Entrant	Class	No	Chassis	Engine	Drivers	1	2	3	4	5	6	Pos.	Pts
2023–24	(Lithuania) Pure Rxcing	LMGT3	91	Porsche 911 GT3 R (992)	Porsche M97/80 4.2 L Flat-6	(Austria) Klaus Bachler (Saint Kitts and Nevis) Alex Malykhin (Germany) Joel Sturm	SEP; 1; 6	SEP; 2; 1	DUB; 1	ABU; 1 Ret	ABU; 2; 2		1st	76
2024–25	(Lithuania) Pure Rxcing	LMP2	91	Oreca 07	Gibson GK428 4.2 L V8	(United Kingdom) Harry King (Saint Kitts and Nevis) Alex Malykhin (Switzerland) Louis Delétraz 1–2 (France) Julien Andlauer 3–6	SEP; 1; 3	SEP; 2; 8	DUB; 1; 8	DUB; 2; 8	ABU; 2; 7	ABU; 2; 8	6th	19

=== FIA World Endurance Championship ===
(key) (Races in bold indicate pole position; races in italics indicate fastest lap)

Year	Entrant	Class	No	Chassis	Engine	Drivers	1	2	3	4	5	6	7	8	Pos.	Pts
2024	(Lithuania) Manthey PureRxcing	LMGT3	92	Porsche 911 GT3 R (992)	Porsche M97/80 4.2 L Flat-6	(Austria) Klaus Bachler (Saint Kitts and Nevis) Alex Malykhin (Germany) Joel Sturm	QAT; 1	**ITA**; 3	SPA; 2	**LMS**; 10	SAP; 1	COA; 2	FUJ; 2	BHR; 9	1st	139

* Season still in progress.

=== 24 Hours of Le Mans ===
Year	Entrant	No.	Car	Drivers	Class	Laps	Pos.	Class Pos.
2024	(Lithuania) Manthey PureRxcing	92	Porsche 911 GT3 R (992)	(Austria) Klaus Bachler (Saint Kitts and Nevis) Alex Malykhin (Germany) Joel Sturm	LMGT3	273	41th	14th
2025	(Lithuania) CLX – Pure Rxcing	37	Oreca 07-Gibson	(United Kingdom) Tom Blomqvist (Saint Kitts and Nevis) Alex Malykhin (France) Tristan Vautier	LMP2	358	32nd	14th

=== European Le Mans Series ===
(key) (Races in bold indicate pole position; races in italics indicate fastest lap)

Year	Entrant	Class	No	Chassis	Engine	Drivers	1	2	3	4	5	6	Pos.	Pts
2025	(Lithuania) CLX – Pure Rxcing	LMP2	37	Oreca 07	Gibson GK428 4.2 L V8	(United Kingdom) Tom Blomqvist (Saint Kitts and Nevis) Alex Malykhin (France) Tristan Vautier	CAT; 4	LEC; Ret	IMO; 10	SPA; 9	SIL; Ret	ALG	13th	15
