= 2024 4 Hours of Abu Dhabi =

Endurance sportscar racing event

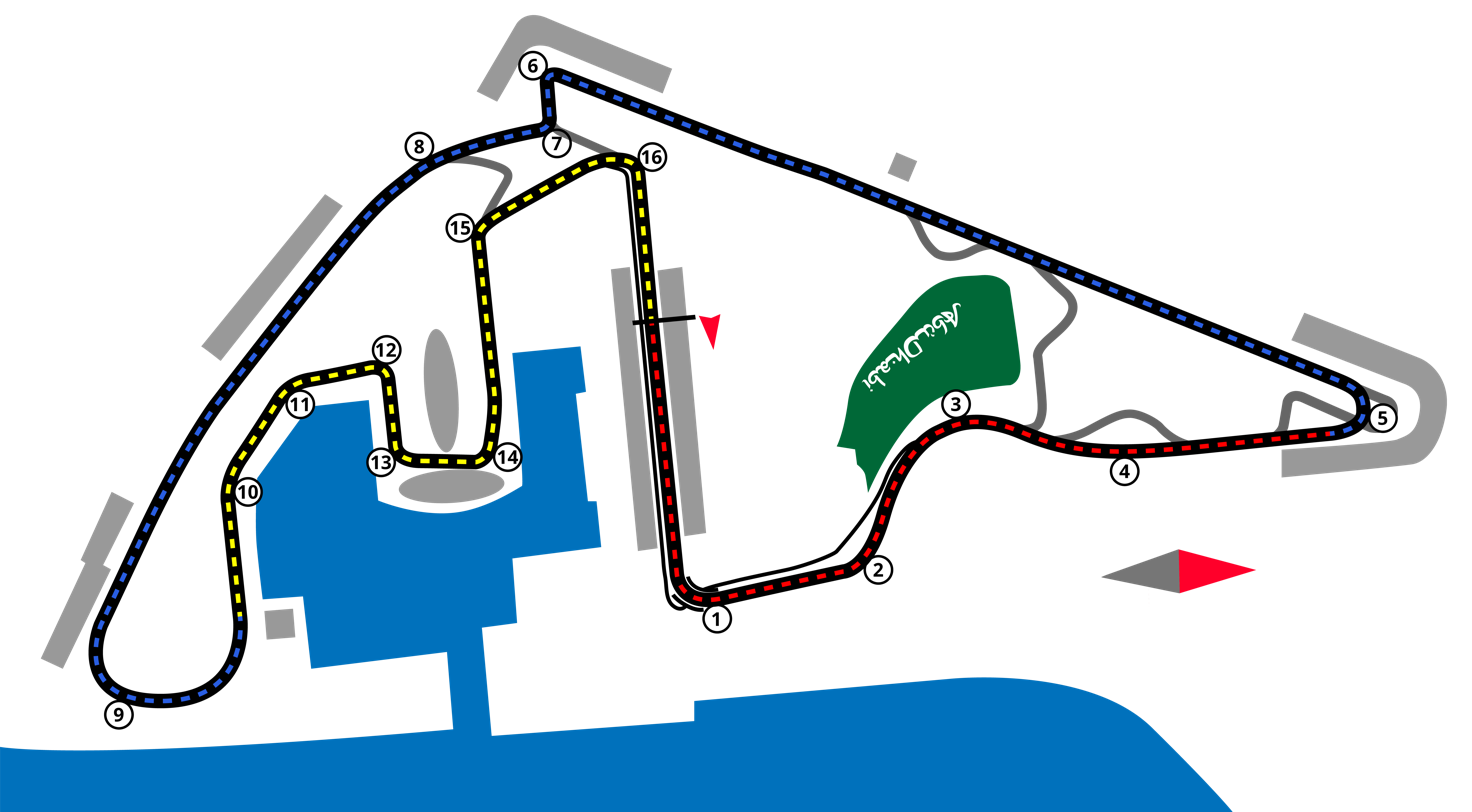
The layout of the Yas Marina Circuit

The 2024 4 Hours of Abu Dhabi was an endurance sportscar racing event held between 9 and 11 February 2024 at Yas Marina Circuit on Yas Island, United Arab Emirates. It was penultimate and the last round of 2023–24 Asian Le Mans Series season.

== Schedule ==
Date	Time (local: UTC+4)	Event
Friday, 9 February	15:00	Free Practice 1
Friday, 9 February	18:35	Free Practice 2
Saturday, 10 February	10:45	Qualifying
Saturday, 10 February	15:00	Race 1
Sunday, 11 February	10:55	Warm-up
Sunday, 11 February	16:00	Race 2

== Entry list ==
The pre-event entry list consisted of 42 entries in 3 categories – 13 in LMP2, 6 in LMP3 and 23 in GT. In comparison to the previous round there is one new entry – the No. 18 Huber Motorsport with Dorian Boccolacci, Jannes Fittje, and Stanislav Minsky as its drivers.

Nikita Mazepin fell ill ahead of pre-event testing and was forced to miss out this round. Filipe Albuquerque replaced him in the LMP2 points-leading No. 99 99 Racing crew. Paul Evrard returned to the No. 43 Saintéloc Racing after missing previous round. Florian Scholze replaced Bihuang Zhou in the No. 43 Saintéloc Racing. Jean-Baptiste Simmenauer replaced Oliver Rasmussen in the No. 30 Duqueine Team.

The No. 43 Saintéloc Racing withdrew from both races after a crash in Qualifying session. The No. 86 GR Racing withdrew from Race 2 after a crash in Race 1.

== Free practice ==
- Only the fastest car in each class is shown.

Free Practice 1	Class	No.	Entrant	Time
Free Practice 1	LMP2	99	(Jordan) 99 Racing	1:41.303
Free Practice 1	LMP3	17	(Switzerland) Cool Racing	1:48.700
Free Practice 1	GT	21	(Italy) AF Corse	1:53.116
Free Practice 2	Class	No.	Entrant	Time
Free Practice 2	LMP2	4	(Portugal) CrowdStrike Racing by APR	1:41.337
Free Practice 2	LMP3	2	(Spain) CD Sport	1:49.318
Free Practice 2	GT	86	(United Kingdom) GR Racing	1:52.771

== Race 1 ==
=== Qualifying ===
Pole position winners in each class are marked in bold.

Pos	Class	No.	Team	Driver	Time	Gap	Grid
1	**LMP2**	**99**	**(Jordan) 99 Racing**	**(Oman) Ahmad Al Harthy**	**1:40.720**	—	1
2	LMP2	22	(Germany) Proton Competition	(Italy) Giorgio Roda	1:41.526	+0.806	2
3	LMP2	90	(United Kingdom) TF Sport	(Turkey) Salih Yoluç	1:41.565	+0.845	3
4	LMP2	30	(France) Duqueine Team	(United States) John Falb	1:42.057	+1.337	4
5	LMP2	4	(Portugal) CrowdStrike Racing by APR	(United States) George Kurtz	1:42.733	+2.013	5
6	LMP2	3	(Luxembourg) DKR Engineering	(Germany) Alexander Mattschull	1:42.792	+2.072	6
7	LMP2	83	(Italy) AF Corse	(France) François Perrodo	1:42.919	+2.199	7
8	LMP2	55	(Germany) Proton Competition	(United States) P. J. Hyett	1:43.186	+2.466	8
9	LMP2	47	(Switzerland) Cool Racing	(Switzerland) Alexandre Coigny	1:43.436	+2.716	9
10	LMP2	25	(Portugal) Algarve Pro Racing	(United States) Chris McMurry	1:43.852	+3.132	10
11	LMP2	24	(United Kingdom) Nielsen Racing	(United Kingdom) Ian Loggie	1:44.052	+3.332	11
12	LMP2	34	(United Kingdom) Nielsen Racing	(United States) Blake McDonald	1:44.119	+3.399	12
13	LMP2	44	(Slovakia) ARC Bratislava	(Slovakia) Miro Konôpka	1:47.211	+6.491	13
14	**LMP3**	**17**	**(Switzerland) Cool Racing**	**(Saint Kitts and Nevis) Alexander Bukhantsov**	**1:48.499**	**+7.779**	14
15	LMP3	26	(Czech Republic) Bretton Racing	(Algeria) Julien Gerbi	1:48.905	+8.185	15
16	LMP3	20	(Denmark) High Class Racing	(Iceland) Auðunn Guðmundsson	1:50.258	+9.538	16
17	LMP3	2	(Spain) CD Sport	(United Kingdom) Nick Adcock	1:50.422	+9.702	17
18	**GT**	**7**	**(Oman) Al Manar Racing by GetSpeed**	**(China) Anthony Liu**	**1:52.673**	**+11.953**	20
19	GT	9	(Germany) GetSpeed	(Austria) Martin Konrad	1:52.939	+12.219	21
20	GT	98	(United Arab Emirates) Dragon Racing	(Italy) Marco Pulcini	1:53.224	+12.504	22
21	GT	91	(Lithuania) Pure Rxcing	(Saint Kitts and Nevis) Alex Malykhin	1:53.270	+12.550	23
22	GT	69	(United Kingdom) Optimum Motorsport	(United Kingdom) James Cottingham	1:53.342	+12.622	24
23	LMP3	58	(Australia) GG Classic Cars	(Australia) George Nakas	1:53.429	+12.709	18
24	GT	88	(Australia) Triple Eight	(Malaysia) Prince Jefri Ibrahim	1:53.595	+12.875	25
25	GT	27	(United Kingdom) Optimum Motorsport	(United Kingdom) Mark Radcliffe	1:53.808	+13.088	26
26	GT	42	(France) Saintéloc Racing	(France) Alban Varutti	1:53.849	+13.129	27
27	GT	33	(Germany) Herberth Motorsport	(Hong Kong) Antares Au	1:53.959	+13.239	28
28	GT	21	(Italy) AF Corse	(France) François Heriau	1:54.068	+13.348	29
29	LMP3	65	(Malaysia) Viper Niza Racing	(Malaysia) Douglas Khoo	1:54.292	+13.572	19
30	GT	77	(Japan) D'Station Racing	(Japan) Satoshi Hoshino	1:54.361	+13.641	35
31	GT	19	(Germany) Leipert Motorsport	(Italy) Gabriel Rindone	1:54.414	+13.694	30
32	GT	66	(Germany) Attempto Racing	Andrey Mukovoz	1:54.554	+13.834	31
33	GT	93	(Germany) Team Project 1	(United Kingdom) Darren Leung	1:54.647	+13.927	32
34	GT	95	(United Kingdom) TF Sport	(United Kingdom) John Hartshorne	1:54.938	+14.218	33
35	GT	8	(New Zealand) EBM	(Indonesia) Setiawan Santoso	1:55.281	+14.561	34
36	GT	11	(Germany) Attempto Racing	(Canada) Ilya Gorbatsky	1:55.471	+14.751	36
37	GT	82	(Italy) AF Corse	(France) Charles-Henri Samani	1:55.586	+14.866	37
38	GT	86	(United Kingdom) GR Racing	(United Kingdom) Michael Wainwright	1:55.617	+14.897	38
39	GT	75	(Germany) Team Motopark	(Denmark) Morten Strømsted	1:56.312	+15.592	39
40	GT	84	(New Zealand) EBM	(Malaysia) Adrian D'Silva	1:56.987	+16.267	40
41	GT	18	(Germany) Huber Motorsport	(Cyprus) Stanislav Minsky	1:59.570	+18.850	41
42	GT	43	(France) Saintéloc Racing	—			—

=== Race ===
==== Race result ====
The minimum number of laps for classification (70% of overall winning car's distance) was 73 laps. Class winners are marked in bold.

Final Classification
Pos	Class	No.	Team	Drivers	Car	Tyres	Laps	Time/Gap
1	**LMP2**	**4**	**(Portugal) CrowdStrike Racing by APR**	**(United States) George Kurtz (United States) Colin Braun (Denmark) Malthe Jakobsen**	**Oreca 07**	MI	**105**	**4:00:48.667**
2	LMP2	83	(Italy) AF Corse	(France) François Perrodo (France) Matthieu Vaxivière (Italy) Alessio Rovera	Oreca 07	MI	105	+5.066
3	LMP2	3	(Luxembourg) DKR Engineering	(Germany) Alexander Mattschull (France) Tom Dillmann (Germany) Laurents Hörr	Oreca 07	MI	105	+34.274
4	LMP2	90	(United Kingdom) TF Sport	(Turkey) Salih Yoluç (United States) Michael Dinan (Republic of Ireland) Charlie Eastwood	Oreca 07	MI	105	+34.854
5	LMP2	22	(Germany) Proton Competition	(Italy) Giorgio Roda (France) Julien Andlauer (Austria) René Binder	Oreca 07	MI	105	+37.088
6	LMP2	30	(France) Duqueine Team	(United States) John Falb (Thailand) Carl Bennett (France) Jean-Baptiste Simmenauer	Oreca 07	MI	105	+58.628
7	LMP2	25	(Portugal) Algarve Pro Racing	(United States) Chris McMurry (United Kingdom) Freddie Tomlinson (United Kingdom) Toby Sowery	Oreca 07	MI	105	+1:31.001
8	LMP2	34	(United Kingdom) Nielsen Racing	(United States) Blake McDonald (United States) Patrick Liddy (United Kingdom) Matthew Bell	Oreca 07	MI	103	+2 Laps
9	LMP2	24	(United Kingdom) Nielsen Racing	(United Kingdom) Ian Loggie (Mexico) Alejandro García (Austria) Ferdinand Habsburg	Oreca 07	MI	103	+2 Laps
10	LMP2	55	(Germany) Proton Competition	(United States) P. J. Hyett (United Kingdom) Harry Tincknell (France) Paul-Loup Chatin	Oreca 07	MI	103	+2 Laps
11	LMP2	44	(Slovakia) ARC Bratislava	(Slovakia) Miro Konôpka (Switzerland) Mathias Beche (Germany) Jonas Ried	Oreca 07	MI	102	+3 Laps
12	LMP2	47	(Switzerland) Cool Racing	(Switzerland) Alexandre Coigny (France) Vladislav Lomko (Spain) Lorenzo Fluxá	Oreca 07	MI	101	+4 Laps
13	**LMP3**	**2**	**(Spain) CD Sport**	**(Denmark) Michael Jensen (United Kingdom) Nick Adcock (France) Fabien Lavergne**	**Ligier JS P320**	MI	**101**	**+4 Laps**
14	LMP3	17	(Switzerland) Cool Racing	(United Kingdom) James Winslow (Saint Kitts and Nevis) Alexander Bukhantsov (Portugal) Manuel Espírito Santo	Ligier JS P320	MI	100	+5 Laps
15	LMP3	20	(Denmark) High Class Racing	(Iceland) Auðunn Guðmundsson (Denmark) Anders Fjordbach (United States) Seth Lucas	Ligier JS P320	MI	100	+5 Laps
16	LMP3	26	(Czech Republic) Bretton Racing	(Czech Republic) Dan Skočdopole (Algeria) Julien Gerbi (Romania) Mihnea Stefan	Ligier JS P320	MI	100	+5 Laps
17	**GT**	**88**	**(Australia) Triple Eight**	**(Malaysia) Prince Jefri Ibrahim (Australia) Jordan Love (Germany) Luca Stolz**	**Mercedes-AMG GT3 Evo**	MI	**99**	**+6 Laps**
18	GT	19	(Germany) Leipert Motorsport	(Italy) Gabriel Rindone (New Zealand) Brendon Leitch (Italy) Marco Mapelli	Lamborghini Huracán GT3 Evo 2	MI	99	+6 Laps
19	GT	27	(United Kingdom) Optimum Motorsport	(United Kingdom) Mark Radcliffe (United Kingdom) Rob Bell (United Kingdom) Ollie Millroy	McLaren 720S GT3 Evo	MI	99	+6 Laps
20	GT	69	(United Kingdom) Optimum Motorsport	(United Kingdom) Sam De Haan (United Kingdom) James Cottingham (United Kingdom) Tom Gamble	McLaren 720S GT3 Evo	MI	99	+6 Laps
21	GT	33	(Germany) Herberth Motorsport	(Hong Kong) Antares Au (Netherlands) Morris Schuring (Germany) Laurin Heinrich	Porsche 911 GT3 R (992)	MI	98	+7 Laps
22	LMP3	58	(Australia) GG Classic Cars	(Australia) Fraser Ross (Australia) George Nakas	Ligier JS P320	MI	98	+7 Laps
23	GT	95	(United Kingdom) TF Sport	(United Kingdom) John Hartshorne (United Kingdom) Ben Tuck (United Kingdom) Jonathan Adam	Aston Martin Vantage AMR GT3	MI	98	+7 Laps
24	GT	21	(Italy) AF Corse	(United States) Simon Mann (France) François Heriau (Italy) Davide Rigon	Ferrari 296 GT3	MI	98	+7 Laps
25	GT	93	(Germany) Team Project 1	(United Kingdom) Darren Leung (United States) Christian Bogle (United Kingdom) Dan Harper	BMW M4 GT3	MI	98	+7 Laps
26	GT	7	(Oman) Al Manar Racing by GetSpeed	(Oman) Al Faisal Al Zubair (Germany) Fabian Schiller (China) Anthony Liu	Mercedes-AMG GT3 Evo	MI	98	+7 Laps
27	GT	42	(France) Saintéloc Racing	(Germany) Christopher Haase (Belgium) Gilles Magnus (France) Alban Varutti	Audi R8 LMS Evo II	MI	98	+7 Laps
28	GT	66	(Germany) Attempto Racing	(Luxembourg) Dylan Pereira (Germany) Alex Aka; Andrey Mukovoz	Audi R8 LMS Evo II	MI	98	+7 Laps
29	GT	98	(United Arab Emirates) Dragon Racing	(Angola) Rui Andrade (Italy) Nicola Marinangeli (Italy) Marco Pulcini	Ferrari 296 GT3	MI	97	+8 Laps
30	GT	8	(New Zealand) EBM	(Indonesia) Setiawan Santoso (Thailand) Tanart Sathienthirakul (Denmark) Bastian Buus	Porsche 911 GT3 R (992)	MI	97	+8 Laps
31	GT	75	(Germany) Team Motopark	(Austria) Lukas Dunner (Germany) Heiko Neumann (Denmark) Morten Strømsted	Mercedes-AMG GT3 Evo	MI	97	+8 Laps
32	GT	9	(Germany) GetSpeed	(United States) Anthony Bartone (United Kingdom) Aaron Walker (Austria) Martin Konrad	Mercedes-AMG GT3 Evo	MI	97	+8 Laps
33	GT	82	(Italy) AF Corse	(France) Charles-Henri Samani (France) Emmanuel Collard (Japan) Kei Cozzolino	Ferrari 296 GT3	MI	96	+9 Laps
34	GT	84	(New Zealand) EBM	(Malaysia) Adrian D'Silva (China) Kerong Li (New Zealand) Earl Bamber	Porsche 911 GT3 R (992)	MI	96	+9 Laps
35	GT	18	(Germany) Huber Motorsport	(Cyprus) Stanislav Minsky (Germany) Jannes Fittje (France) Dorian Boccolacci	Porsche 911 GT3 R (992)	MI	94	+11 Laps
36	GT	77	(Japan) D'Station Racing	(Japan) Satoshi Hoshino (Japan) Tomonobu Fujii (United Kingdom) Casper Stevenson	Aston Martin Vantage AMR GT3	MI	91	+14 Laps
Not Classified
	GT	86	(United Kingdom) GR Racing	(United Kingdom) Michael Wainwright (United Kingdom) Benjamin Barker (Italy) Riccardo Pera	Ferrari 296 GT3	MI	78	
	LMP3	65	(Malaysia) Viper Niza Racing	(Malaysia) Douglas Khoo (Malaysia) Dominic Ang	Ligier JS P320	MI	63	
	LMP2	99	(Jordan) 99 Racing	(Oman) Ahmad Al Harthy (Portugal) Filipe Albuquerque (Switzerland) Louis Delétraz	Oreca 07	MI	47	
	GT	91	(Lithuania) Pure Rxcing	(Saint Kitts and Nevis) Alex Malykhin (Austria) Klaus Bachler (Germany) Joel Sturm	Porsche 911 GT3 R (992)	MI	43	
	GT	11	(Germany) Attempto Racing	Alexey Nesov; Sergey Titarenko (Canada) Ilya Gorbatsky	Audi R8 LMS Evo II	MI	37	

==== Statistics ====
===== Fastest lap =====
Class	Driver	Team	Time	Lap
LMP2	(France) Tom Dillmann	(Luxembourg) #3 DKR Engineering	1:40.725	54
LMP3	(Portugal) Manuel Espírito Santo	(Switzerland) #17 Cool Racing	1:48.652	97
GT	(Belgium) Gilles Magnus	(France) #42 Saintéloc Racing	1:52.798	89

== Race 2 ==
=== Qualifying ===
One Qualifying session was held. Each crew's second fastest lap was used to determine the grid for the Race 2. Pole position winners in each class are marked in bold.

Pos	Class	No.	Team	Driver	Time	Gap	Grid
1	**LMP2**	**99**	**(Jordan) 99 Racing**	**(Oman) Ahmad Al Harthy**	**1:41.313**	—	1
2	LMP2	90	(United Kingdom) TF Sport	(Turkey) Salih Yoluç	1:41.677	+0.364	2
3	LMP2	22	(Germany) Proton Competition	(Italy) Giorgio Roda	1:41.979	+0.666	3
4	LMP2	30	(France) Duqueine Team	(United States) John Falb	1:42.408	+1.095	4
5	LMP2	4	(Portugal) CrowdStrike Racing by APR	(United States) George Kurtz	1:42.834	+1.521	5
6	LMP2	3	(Luxembourg) DKR Engineering	(Germany) Alexander Mattschull	1:42.955	+1.642	6
7	LMP2	83	(Italy) AF Corse	(France) François Perrodo	1:43.471	+2.158	7
8	LMP2	47	(Switzerland) Cool Racing	(Switzerland) Alexandre Coigny	1:43.713	+2.400	8
9	LMP2	55	(Germany) Proton Competition	(United States) P. J. Hyett	1:43.854	+2.541	9
10	LMP2	25	(Portugal) Algarve Pro Racing	(United States) Chris McMurry	1:44.106	+2.793	10
11	LMP2	24	(United Kingdom) Nielsen Racing	(United Kingdom) Ian Loggie	1:44.117	+2.804	11
12	LMP2	34	(United Kingdom) Nielsen Racing	(United States) Blake McDonald	1:44.486	+3.173	12
13	**LMP3**	**17**	**(Switzerland) Cool Racing**	**(Saint Kitts and Nevis) Alexander Bukhantsov**	**1:48.618**	**+7.305**	13
14	LMP3	26	(Czech Republic) Bretton Racing	(Algeria) Julien Gerbi	1:49.058	+7.745	14
15	LMP2	44	(Slovakia) ARC Bratislava	(Slovakia) Miro Konôpka	1:49.569	+8.256	15
16	LMP3	2	(Spain) CD Sport	(United Kingdom) Nick Adcock	1:50.677	+9.364	16
17	LMP3	20	(Denmark) High Class Racing	(Iceland) Auðunn Guðmundsson	1:50.687	+9.374	17
18	**GT**	**9**	**(Germany) GetSpeed**	**(Austria) Martin Konrad**	**1:53.213**	**+11.900**	20
19	GT	7	(Oman) Al Manar Racing by GetSpeed	(China) Anthony Liu	1:53.261	+11.948	21
20	GT	91	Pure Rxcing	(Saint Kitts and Nevis) Alex Malykhin	1:53.415	+12.102	22
21	GT	98	(United Arab Emirates) Dragon Racing	(Italy) Marco Pulcini	1:53.415	+12.102	23
22	GT	88	(Australia) Triple Eight	(Malaysia) Prince Jefri Ibrahim	1:53.770	+12.457	24
23	GT	69	(United Kingdom) Optimum Motorsport	(United Kingdom) James Cottingham	1:54.079	+12.766	25
24	GT	27	(United Kingdom) Optimum Motorsport	(United Kingdom) Mark Radcliffe	1:54.157	+12.844	26
25	GT	77	(Japan) D'Station Racing	(Japan) Satoshi Hoshino	1:54.470	+13.157	27
26	LMP3	58	(Australia) GG Classic Cars	(Australia) George Nakas	1:54.475	+13.162	18
27	GT	19	(Germany) Leipert Motorsport	(Italy) Gabriel Rindone	1:54.688	+13.375	28
28	GT	21	(Italy) AF Corse	(France) François Heriau	1:54.704	+13.391	29
29	GT	33	(Germany) Herberth Motorsport	(Hong Kong) Antares Au	1:54.943	+13.630	30
30	GT	66	(Germany) Attempto Racing	Andrey Mukovoz	1:55.111	+13.798	31
31	LMP3	65	(Malaysia) Viper Niza Racing	(Malaysia) Douglas Khoo	1:55.239	+13.926	19
32	GT	11	(Germany) Attempto Racing	(Canada) Ilya Gorbatsky	1:55.515	+14.202	32
33	GT	82	(Italy) AF Corse	(France) Charles-Henri Samani	1:55.697	+14.384	33
34	GT	8	(New Zealand) EBM	(Indonesia) Setiawan Santoso	1:55.866	+14.553	34
35	GT	95	(United Kingdom) TF Sport	(United Kingdom) John Hartshorne	1:55.941	+14.628	35
36	GT	42	(France) Saintéloc Racing	(France) Alban Varutti	1:56.187	+14.874	36
37	GT	86	(United Kingdom) GR Racing	(United Kingdom) Michael Wainwright	1:56.363	+15.050	—
38	GT	75	(Germany) Team Motopark	(Denmark) Morten Strømsted	1:56.882	+15.569	37
39	GT	84	(New Zealand) EBM	(Malaysia) Adrian D'Silva	1:57.278	+15.965	38
40	GT	93	(Germany) Team Project 1	(United Kingdom) Darren Leung	1:59.566	+18.253	39
41	GT	18	(Germany) Huber Motorsport	(Cyprus) Stanislav Minsky	2:00.335	+19.022	40
42	GT	43	(France) Saintéloc Racing	—			—

=== Race ===
==== Race result ====
The minimum number of laps for classification (70% of overall winning car's distance) was 63 laps. Class winners are marked in bold.

Final Classification
Pos	Class	No.	Team	Drivers	Car	Tyres	Laps	Time/Gap
1	**LMP2**	**25**	**(Portugal) Algarve Pro Racing**	**(United States) Chris McMurry (United Kingdom) Freddie Tomlinson (United Kingdom) Toby Sowery**	**Oreca 07**	MI	**90**	**4:00:40.166**
2	LMP2	22	(Germany) Proton Competition	(Italy) Giorgio Roda (France) Julien Andlauer (Austria) René Binder	Oreca 07	MI	90	+1:09.676
3	LMP2	30	(France) Duqueine Team	(United States) John Falb (Thailand) Carl Bennett (France) Jean-Baptiste Simmenauer	Oreca 07	MI	90	+1:37.693
4	LMP2	3	(Luxembourg) DKR Engineering	(Germany) Alexander Mattschull (France) Tom Dillmann (Germany) Laurents Hörr	Oreca 07	MI	90	+2:19.752
5	LMP2	4	(Portugal) CrowdStrike Racing by APR	(United States) George Kurtz (United States) Colin Braun (Denmark) Malthe Jakobsen	Oreca 07	MI	89	+1 Lap
6	LMP2	90	(United Kingdom) TF Sport	(Turkey) Salih Yoluç (United States) Michael Dinan (Republic of Ireland) Charlie Eastwood	Oreca 07	MI	89	+1 Lap
7	LMP2	24	(United Kingdom) Nielsen Racing	(United Kingdom) Ian Loggie (Mexico) Alejandro García (Austria) Ferdinand Habsburg	Oreca 07	MI	89	+1 Lap
8	LMP2	44	(Slovakia) ARC Bratislava	(Slovakia) Miro Konôpka (Switzerland) Mathias Beche (Germany) Jonas Ried	Oreca 07	MI	89	+1 Lap
9	LMP2	34	(United Kingdom) Nielsen Racing	(United States) Blake McDonald (United States) Patrick Liddy (United Kingdom) Matthew Bell	Oreca 07	MI	89	+1 Lap
10	LMP2	47	(Switzerland) Cool Racing	(Switzerland) Alexandre Coigny (France) Vladislav Lomko (Spain) Lorenzo Fluxá	Oreca 07	MI	88	+2 Laps
11	LMP2	99	(Jordan) 99 Racing	(Oman) Ahmad Al Harthy (Portugal) Filipe Albuquerque (Switzerland) Louis Delétraz	Oreca 07	MI	88	+2 Laps
12	LMP2	83	(Italy) AF Corse	(France) François Perrodo (France) Matthieu Vaxivière (Italy) Alessio Rovera	Oreca 07	MI	86	+4 Laps
13	**LMP3**	**26**	**(Czech Republic) Bretton Racing**	**(Czech Republic) Dan Skočdopole (Algeria) Julien Gerbi (Romania) Mihnea Stefan**	**Ligier JS P320**	MI	**86**	**+4 Laps**
14	LMP3	17	(Switzerland) Cool Racing	(United Kingdom) James Winslow (Saint Kitts and Nevis) Alexander Bukhantsov (Portugal) Manuel Espírito Santo	Ligier JS P320	MI	86	+4 Laps
15	LMP3	2	(Spain) CD Sport	(Denmark) Michael Jensen (United Kingdom) Nick Adcock (France) Fabien Lavergne	Ligier JS P320	MI	85	+5 Laps
16	LMP3	20	(Denmark) High Class Racing	(Iceland) Auðunn Guðmundsson (Denmark) Anders Fjordbach (United States) Seth Lucas	Ligier JS P320	MI	85	+5 Laps
17	**GT**	**88**	**(Australia) Triple Eight**	**(Malaysia) Prince Jefri Ibrahim (Australia) Jordan Love (Germany) Luca Stolz**	**Mercedes-AMG GT3 Evo**	MI	**84**	**+6 Laps**
18	GT	91	(Lithuania) Pure Rxcing	(Saint Kitts and Nevis) Alex Malykhin (Austria) Klaus Bachler (Germany) Joel Sturm	Porsche 911 GT3 R (992)	MI	84	+6 Laps
19	GT	95	(United Kingdom) TF Sport	(United Kingdom) John Hartshorne (United Kingdom) Ben Tuck (United Kingdom) Jonathan Adam	Aston Martin Vantage AMR GT3	MI	84	+6 Laps
20	GT	42	(France) Saintéloc Racing	(Germany) Christopher Haase (Belgium) Gilles Magnus (France) Alban Varutti	Audi R8 LMS Evo II	MI	84	+6 Laps
21	GT	21	(Italy) AF Corse	(United States) Simon Mann (France) François Heriau (Italy) Davide Rigon	Ferrari 296 GT3	MI	84	+6 Laps
22	GT	82	(Italy) AF Corse	(France) Charles-Henri Samani (France) Emmanuel Collard (Japan) Kei Cozzolino	Ferrari 296 GT3	MI	84	+6 Laps
23	GT	19	(Germany) Leipert Motorsport	(Italy) Gabriel Rindone (New Zealand) Brendon Leitch (Italy) Marco Mapelli	Lamborghini Huracán GT3 Evo 2	MI	84	+6 Laps
24	GT	7	(Oman) Al Manar Racing by GetSpeed	(Oman) Al Faisal Al Zubair (Germany) Fabian Schiller (China) Anthony Liu	Mercedes-AMG GT3 Evo	MI	83	+7 Laps
25	GT	66	(Germany) Attempto Racing	(Luxembourg) Dylan Pereira (Germany) Alex Aka; Andrey Mukovoz	Audi R8 LMS Evo II	MI	83	+7 Laps
26	GT	33	(Germany) Herberth Motorsport	(Hong Kong) Antares Au (Netherlands) Morris Schuring (Germany) Laurin Heinrich	Porsche 911 GT3 R (992)	MI	83	+7 Laps
27	GT	69	(United Kingdom) Optimum Motorsport	(United Kingdom) Sam De Haan (United Kingdom) James Cottingham (United Kingdom) Tom Gamble	McLaren 720S GT3 Evo	MI	83	+7 Laps
28	GT	98	(United Arab Emirates) Dragon Racing	(Angola) Rui Andrade (Italy) Nicola Marinangeli (Italy) Marco Pulcini	Ferrari 296 GT3	MI	83	+7 Laps
29	GT	77	(Japan) D'Station Racing	(Japan) Satoshi Hoshino (Japan) Tomonobu Fujii (United Kingdom) Casper Stevenson	Aston Martin Vantage AMR GT3	MI	83	+7 Laps
30	GT	27	(United Kingdom) Optimum Motorsport	(United Kingdom) Mark Radcliffe (United Kingdom) Rob Bell (United Kingdom) Ollie Millroy	McLaren 720S GT3 Evo	MI	83	+7 Laps
31	GT	93	(Germany) Team Project 1	(United Kingdom) Darren Leung (United States) Christian Bogle (United Kingdom) Dan Harper	BMW M4 GT3	MI	83	+7 Laps
32	GT	11	(Germany) Attempto Racing	Alexey Nesov; Sergey Titarenko (Canada) Ilya Gorbatsky	Audi R8 LMS Evo II	MI	82	+8 Laps
33	GT	84	(New Zealand) EBM	(Malaysia) Adrian D'Silva (China) Kerong Li (New Zealand) Earl Bamber	Porsche 911 GT3 R (992)	MI	82	+8 Laps
34	LMP3	65	(Malaysia) Viper Niza Racing	(Malaysia) Douglas Khoo (Malaysia) Dominic Ang	Ligier JS P320	MI	82	+8 Laps
35	GT	18	(Germany) Huber Motorsport	(Cyprus) Stanislav Minsky (Germany) Jannes Fittje (France) Dorian Boccolacci	Porsche 911 GT3 R (992)	MI	82	+8 Laps
Not classified
	GT	75	(Germany) Team Motopark	(Austria) Lukas Dunner (Germany) Heiko Neumann (Denmark) Morten Strømsted	Mercedes-AMG GT3 Evo	MI	57	
	LMP2	55	(Germany) Proton Competition	(United States) P. J. Hyett (United Kingdom) Harry Tincknell (France) Paul-Loup Chatin	Oreca 07	MI	20	
	GT	8	(New Zealand) EBM	(Indonesia) Setiawan Santoso (Thailand) Tanart Sathienthirakul (Denmark) Bastian Buus	Porsche 911 GT3 R (992)	MI	19	
	LMP3	58	(Australia) GG Classic Cars	(Australia) Fraser Ross (Australia) George Nakas	Ligier JS P320	MI	1	
	GT	9	(Germany) GetSpeed	(United States) Anthony Bartone (United Kingdom) Aaron Walker (Austria) Martin Konrad	Mercedes-AMG GT3 Evo	MI	0	

==== Statistics ====
===== Fastest lap =====
Class	Driver	Team	Time	Lap
LMP2	(France) Julien Andlauer	(Germany) #22 Proton Competition	1:41.697	61
LMP3	(Portugal) Manuel Espirito Santo	(Switzerland) #17 Cool Racing	1:49.792	78
GT	(Australia) Jordan Love	(Australia) #88 Triple Eight	1:53.112	64
