= 2023 Road to Le Mans =

Automobile endurance event

Circuit de la Sarthe track

The 8th Road to Le Mans was a sports car race held on 8 and 9 June 2023 at the Circuit de la Sarthe, Le Mans, France. The race featured LMP3 and GT3 category cars competing in their respective classes.

== Entry list ==
Icon	Series
MLMS	Michelin Le Mans Cup
ELMS	European Le Mans Series
GTWC	SRO GT World Challenge
ALMS	Asian Le Mans Series
RLMS	Road to Le Mans only

No.	Entrant	Car	Series	Driver 1	Driver 2
LMP3 (38 entries)
2	(Spain) CD Sport	Ligier JS P320 - Nissan	MLMS	(France) Fabien Michal	Kirill Smal (Note: Smal is Russian, but he competes as a neutral competitor as Russian national emblems were banned by the FIA following the Russian invasion of Ukraine. Bukhantsov, also a Russian, competes under an Emirati licence for the same reason.)
3	(Luxembourg) DKR Engineering	Duqueine M30 - D08 - Nissan	MLMS	(United Arab Emirates) Alexander Bukhanstov	(United Kingdom) James Winslow
4	(United Kingdom) Nielsen Racing	Duqueine M30 - D08 - Nissan	MLMS	(United Kingdom) Matthew Bell	(United States) John Melsom
5	(Luxembourg) DKR Engineering	Duqueine M30 - D08 - Nissan	ELMS	(Mozambique) Pedro Perino	(Poland) Robin Rogalski
6	(France) ANS Motorsport	Ligier JS P320 - Nissan	MLMS	(Switzerland) Jonathan Brossard	(France) Nicholas Schatz
7	(United Kingdom) Nielsen Racing	Ligier JS P320 - Nissan	MLMS	(United Kingdom) Josh Skelton	(United Kingdom) Anthony Wells
8	(France) Graff Racing	Ligier JS P320 - Nissan	MLMS	(Australia) George Nakas	(Australia) Fraser Ross
9	(Switzerland) Racing Spirit of Léman	Ligier JS P320 - Nissan	MLMS	(Germany) Christian Gisy	(Germany) Ralf Kelleners
11	(Spain) CD Sport	Ligier JS P320 - Nissan	MLMS	(France) Franck Chappard	(Lebanon) Shahan Sarkissian
12	(Switzerland) Racing Spirit of Léman	Ligier JS P320 - Nissan	ELMS	(France) Antoine Doquin	(France) Jacques Wolff
13	(Poland) Inter Europol Competition	Ligier JS P320 - Nissan	MLMS	(Spain) Santiago Concepción Serrano	(United Kingdom) Ben Stone
14	(Poland) Inter Europol Competition	Ligier JS P320 - Nissan	MLMS	(Canada) Daniel Ali	(Australia) Andres Latorre Canon
15	(Poland) Inter Europol Competition	Ligier JS P320 - Nissan	MLMS	(United States) Bryson Morris	(United Kingdom) Chris Short
16	(Poland) Team Virage	Ligier JS P320 - Nissan	MLMS	(Algeria) Julien Gerbi	(France) Gillian Henrion
17	(France) IDEC Sport	Ligier JS P320 - Nissan	MLMS	(France) Patrice Lafargue	(France) Dino Lunardi
20	(United Kingdom) United Autosports	Ligier JS P320 - Nissan	ELMS	(United Kingdom) Andy Meyrick	(Brazil) Daniel Schneider
21	(United Kingdom) United Autosports	Ligier JS P320 - Nissan	ELMS	(United States) Jim McGuire	(United Kingdom) Guy Smith
22	(United Kingdom) United Autosports	Ligier JS P320 - Nissan	MLMS	(Australia) Scott Andrews	(United States) Gerald Kraut
23	(United Kingdom) United Autosports	Ligier JS P320 - Nissan	MLMS	(United Kingdom) Wayne Boyd	(United States) John Schauerman
25	(United Kingdom) 360 Racing	Ligier JS P320 - Nissan	MLMS	(Spain) Belén García	(United Kingdom) Mark Richards
26	(United Kingdom) 360 Racing	Ligier JS P320 - Nissan	MLMS	(United Kingdom) Tommy Foster	(United Kingdom) Terrence Woodward
27	(United Kingdom) 24-7 Motorsport	Ligier JS P320 - Nissan	MLMS	(United Kingdom) Andrew Ferguson	(United Kingdom) Louis Hamilton-Smith
28	(France) MV2S Racing	Ligier JS P320 - Nissan	MLMS	(France) Christophe Cresp	(Switzerland) Jérôme de Sadeleer
29	(France) MV2S Racing	Ligier JS P320 - Nissan	MLMS	(France) Mathis Poulet	(Germany) Matthias Lüthen
30	(Germany) Frikadelli Racing Team	Ligier JS P320 - Nissan	MLMS	(Germany) Klaus Abbelen	(Germany) Felipe Fernández Laser
33	(Germany) WTM by Rinaldi Racing	Duqueine M30 - D08 - Nissan	ELMS	(Germany) Torsten Kratz	(Germany) Leonard Weiss
38	(France) Graff Racing	Ligier JS P320 - Nissan	ALMS	(China) Haowen Luo	(Switzerland) Sébastien Page
39	(France) Graff Racing	Ligier JS P320 - Nissan	MLMS	(Republic of Ireland) Lucca Allen	(United Kingdom) James Sweetnam
48	(Republic of Ireland) Murphy Prototypes	Duqueine M30 - D08 - Nissan	MLMS	(Czech Republic) Dan Skočdopole	(United Kingdom) Adrian Watt
58	(Poland) Team Virage	Ligier JS P320 - Nissan	ELMS	(Portugal) Manuel Espírito Santo	(United Kingdom) Martin Rich
59	(Poland) Team Virage	Ligier JS P320 - Nissan	MLMS	(Paraguay) Oscar Bittar	(Italy) Alessandro Bracalente
66	(Germany) Rinaldi Racing	Ligier JS P320 - Nissan	MLMS	(Germany) Daniel Keilwitz	(Germany) Steve Parrow
67	(Switzerland) Haegeli by T2 Racing	Duqueine M30 - D08 - Nissan	MLMS	(Switzerland) Pieder Decurtins	(Belgium) Brent Verheyen
68	(France) M Racing	Ligier JS P320 - Nissan	MLMS	(France) Hugo Delacour	(Portugal) Guilherme Oliveira
69	(France) M Racing	Ligier JS P320 - Nissan	RLMS	(Portugal) Miguel Cristóvão	(France) Sacha Lehmann
77	(Iceland) Team Thor	Ligier JS P320 - Nissan	MLMS	(Iceland) Auðunn Guðmundsson	(United Kingdom) Colin Noble
87	(Switzerland) Cool Racing	Ligier JS P320 - Nissan	MLMS	(France) Adrien Chila	(Switzerland) Cédric Oltramare
97	(Switzerland) Cool Racing	Ligier JS P320 - Nissan	MLMS	(Switzerland) David Droux	(Switzerland) Luis Sanjuan
GT3 (20 entries)
10	(Switzerland) Racing Spirit of Léman	Aston Martin Vantage AMR GT3	MLMS	(France) Valentin Hasse-Clot	(France) Arnold Robin
18	(United Kingdom) Team Parker Racing	Porsche 911 GT3 R (992)	MLMS	(United Kingdom) Nick Jones	(United Kingdom) Scott Malvern
19	(Germany) Leipert Motorsport	Lamborghini Huracán GT3 Evo 2	MLMS	(Finland) Patrick Kujala	(Luxembourg) Gabriel Rindone
31	(Belgium) Team WRT	BMW M4 GT3	GTWC	(Germany) Max Hesse	(United Kingdom) Tim Whale
42	(United Kingdom) Steller Motorsport	Audi R8 LMS Evo II	MLMS	(United Kingdom) Sennan Fielding	(United Kingdom) James Wood
46	(Belgium) Team WRT	BMW M4 GT3	GTWC	(France) Jérôme Policand	(Italy) Valentino Rossi
51	(Italy) AF Corse	Ferrari 296 GT3	MLMS	(Japan) Kei Cozzolino	(Japan) Hiroshi Koizumi
52	(Italy) AF Corse	Ferrari 488 GT3 Evo 2020	RLMS	(Belgium) Laurent de Meeus	(United Kingdom) Jamie Stanley
53	(Italy) AF Corse	Ferrari 488 GT3 Evo 2020	RLMS	(Italy) Gino Forgione	(Italy) Andrea Montermini
55	(Denmark) GMB Motorsport	Honda NSX GT3 Evo22	MLMS	(Denmark) Thomas Andersen	(Denmark) Simon Birch
57	(United States) Winward Racing	Mercedes-AMG GT3 Evo	GTWC	(United States) George Kurtz	(United States) Russell Ward
63	(Italy) Iron Lynx	Lamborghini Huracán GT3 Evo 2	MLMS	(Monaco) Vincent Abril	(Japan) Hiroshi Hamaguchi
64	(United Kingdom) Team Parker Racing	Porsche 911 GT3 R (991)	MLMS	(United Kingdom) Charles Bateman	(United Kingdom) Alex Martin
70	(Germany) Leipert Motorsport	Lamborghini Huracán GT3 Evo 2	MLMS	(New Zealand) Brendon Leitch	(United States) Gerhard Watzinger
74	(Switzerland) Kessel Racing	Ferrari 488 GT3 Evo 2020	RLMS	(Turkey) Murat Çuhadaroğlu	(Italy) David Fumanelli
76	(France) IMSA LS Group Performance	Porsche 911 GT3 R (992)	RLMS	(United States) Charles Luck	(Germany) Marco Seefried
83	(Italy) AF Corse	Ferrari 296 GT3	MLMS	(France) Emmanuel Collard	(France) Charles-Henri Samani
86	(Denmark) HCR with CaffeineSix	Porsche 911 GT3 R (991)	MLMS	(United Kingdom) Tim Creswick	(Denmark) Anders Fjordbach
88	(Denmark) GMB Motorsport	Honda NSX GT3 Evo22	MLMS	(Denmark) Jan Magnussen	(Denmark) Lars Engelbreckt Pedersen
95	(Denmark) GMB Motorsport	BMW M4 GT3	RLMS	(Denmark) Kristian Poulsen	(Denmark) Roland Poulsen

== Free Practice ==
- Only the fastest car in each class is shown.

Free Practice 1	Class	No.	Entrant	Drivers	Time
Free Practice 1	LMP3	#77	(Iceland) Team Thor	(Iceland) Auðunn Guðmundsson (United Kingdom) Colin Noble	3:49.296
Free Practice 1	GT3	#10	(Switzerland) Racing Spirit of Léman	(France) Valentin Hasse-Clot (France) Arnold Robin	3:58.499
Free Practice 2	Class	No.	Entrant	Driver	Time
Free Practice 2	LMP3	#58	(Poland) Team Virage	(Portugal) Manuel Espírito Santo (United Kingdom) Martin Rich	3:50.077
Free Practice 2	GT3	#57	(United States) Winward Racing	(United States) George Kurtz (United States) Russell Ward	3:58.909

== Qualifying ==
Provisional pole positions in each class are denoted in bold.

=== Race 1 ===
Pos.	Class	No.	Team	Qualifying	Grid
1	**LMP3**	**58**	**(Poland) Team Virage**	**3:46.735**	
2	LMP3	23	(United Kingdom) United Autosports	3:47.220	
3	LMP3	66	(Germany) Rinaldi Racing	3:47.271	
4	LMP3	4	(United Kingdom) Nielsen Racing	3:47.279	
5	LMP3	20	(United Kingdom) United Autosports	3:47.388	
6	LMP3	97	(Switzerland) Cool Racing	3:48.307	
7	LMP3	29	(France) MV2S Racing	3:48.337	
8	LMP3	3	(Luxembourg) DKR Engineering	3:48.451	
9	LMP3	77	(Iceland) Team Thor	3:48.640	
10	LMP3	16	(Poland) Team Virage	3:48.673	
11	LMP3	2	(Spain) CD Sport	3:48.779	
12	LMP3	12	(Switzerland) Racing Spirit of Léman	3:48.976	
13	LMP3	30	(Germany) Frikadelli Racing Team	3:48.978	
14	LMP3	22	(United Kingdom) United Autosports	3:48.998	
15	LMP3	26	(United Kingdom) 360 Racing	3:49.131	
16	LMP3	15	(Poland) Inter Europol Competition	3:49.132	
17	LMP3	68	(France) M Racing	3:49.439	
18	LMP3	33	(Germany) WTM by Rinaldi Racing	3:49.528	
19	LMP3	7	(United Kingdom) Nielsen Racing	3:49.635	
20	LMP3	87	(Switzerland) Cool Racing	3:49.808	
21	LMP3	69	(France) M Racing	3:49.960	
22	LMP3	6	(France) ANS Motorsport	3:50.053	
23	LMP3	5	(Luxembourg) DKR Engineering	3:50.957	
24	LMP3	39	(France) Graff Racing	3:51.563	
25	LMP3	8	(France) Graff Racing	3:51.839	
26	LMP3	59	(Poland) Team Virage	3:52.316	
27	LMP3	9	(Switzerland) Racing Spirit of Léman	3:52.542	
28	LMP3	28	(France) MV2S Racing	3:52.628	
29	LMP3	13	(Poland) Inter Europol Competition	3:52.683	
30	LMP3	25	(United Kingdom) 360 Racing	3:53.106	
31	LMP3	14	(Poland) Inter Europol Competition	3:53.151	
32	LMP3	11	(Spain) CD Sport	3:53.174	
33	LMP3	27	(United Kingdom) 24-7 Motorsport	3:53.872	
34	LMP3	17	(France) IDEC Sport	3:54.259	
35	LMP3	48	(Republic of Ireland) Murphy Prototypes	3:55.252	
36	**GT3**	**31**	**(Belgium) Team WRT**	**3:55.888**	
37	GT3	46	(Belgium) Team WRT	3:56.559	
38	GT3	86	(Denmark) HCR with CaffeineSix	3:56.673	
39	GT3	57	(United States) Winward Racing	3:56.853	
40	GT3	63	(Italy) Iron Lynx	3:56.918	
41	GT3	74	(Switzerland) Kessel Racing	3:57.365	
42	GT3	51	(Italy) AF Corse	3:58.194	
43	GT3	42	(United Kingdom) Stellar Motorsport	3:58.485	
44	GT3	70	(Germany) Leipert Motorsport	3:58.808	
45	GT3	18	(United Kingdom) Team Parker Racing	3:58.818	
46	GT3	19	(Germany) Leipert Motorsport	3:59.487	
47	GT3	55	(Denmark) GMB Motorsport	3:59.615	
48	GT3	83	(Italy) AF Corse	3:59.895	
49	GT3	95	(Denmark) GMB Motorsport	4:00.000	
50	GT3	52	(Italy) AF Corse	4:00.306	
51	GT3	88	(Denmark) GMB Motorsport	4:00.659	
52	LMP3	67	(Switzerland) Haegeli by T2 Racing	4:00.764	
53	GT3	64	(United Kingdom) Team Parker Racing	4:01.113	
54	LMP3	38	(France) Graff Racing	4:10.096	
55	GT3	53	(Italy) AF Corse	4:16.893	
56	GT3	10	(Switzerland) Racing Spirit of Léman	No Time	
57	LMP3	21	(United Kingdom) United Autosports	No Time	
58	GT3	76	(France) IMSA LS Group Performance	No Time	

=== Race 2 ===
Pos.	Class	No.	Team	Qualifying	Grid
1	**LMP3**	**2**	**(Spain) CD Sport**	**3:50.349**	
2	LMP3	33	(Germany) WTM by Rinaldi Racing	3:50.536	
3	LMP3	87	(Switzerland) Cool Racing	3:51.779	
4	LMP3	12	(Switzerland) Racing Spirit of Léman	3:53.093	
5	LMP3	25	(United Kingdom) 360 Racing	3:54.274	
6	LMP3	11	(Spain) CD Sport	3:54.276	
7	LMP3	29	(France) MV2S Racing	3:55.245	
8	LMP3	97	(Switzerland) Cool Racing	3:55.376	
9	LMP3	16	(Poland) Team Virage	3:56.020	
10	LMP3	39	(France) Graff Racing	3:56.274	
11	LMP3	13	(Poland) Inter Europol Competition	3:56.665	
12	LMP3	77	(Iceland) Team Thor	3:57.515	
13	LMP3	58	(Poland) Team Virage	3:57.834	
14	LMP3	26	(United Kingdom) 360 Racing	3:58.483	
15	LMP3	69	(France) M Racing	3:58.633	
16	LMP3	59	(Poland) Team Virage	3:58.635	
17	LMP3	6	(France) ANS Motorsport	3:58.724	
18	LMP3	15	(Poland) Inter Europol Competition	3:58.804	
19	LMP3	9	(Switzerland) Racing Spirit of Léman	3:58.992	
20	LMP3	28	(France) MV2S Racing	3:59.108	
21	LMP3	5	(Luxembourg) DKR Engineering	3:59.730	
22	LMP3	7	(United Kingdom) Nielsen Racing	4:00.300	
23	LMP3	23	(United Kingdom) United Autosports	4:00.393	
24	LMP3	17	(France) IDEC Sport	4:00.446	
25	LMP3	20	(United Kingdom) United Autosports	4:00.768	
26	**GT3**	**46**	**(Belgium) Team WRT**	**4:01.170**	
27	LMP3	30	(Germany) Frikadelli Racing Team	4:01.506	
28	LMP3	48	(Republic of Ireland) Murphy Prototypes	4:01.836	
29	GT3	10	(Switzerland) Racing Spirit of Léman	4:02.853	
30	LMP3	22	(United Kingdom) United Autosports	4:03.762	
31	GT3	86	(Denmark) HCR with CaffeineSix	4:04.029	
32	LMP3	66	(Germany) Rinaldi Racing	4:04.459	
33	LMP3	27	(United Kingdom) 24-7 Motorsport	4:05.287	
34	GT3	57	(United States) Winward Racing	4:05.547	
35	GT3	55	(Denmark) GMB Motorsport	4:05.697	
36	GT3	74	(Switzerland) Kessel Racing	4:05.741	
37	LMP3	38	(France) Graff Racing	4:06.104	
38	GT3	18	(United Kingdom) Team Parker Racing	4:06.240	
39	LMP3	68	(France) M Racing	4:06.425	
40	GT3	31	(Belgium) Team WRT	4:06.453	
41	GT3	64	(United Kingdom) Team Parker Racing	4:06.614	
42	GT3	52	(Italy) AF Corse	4:07.016	
43	LMP3	21	(United Kingdom) United Autosports	4:07.108	
44	GT3	51	(Italy) AF Corse	4:07.634	
45	GT3	53	(Italy) AF Corse	4:08.408	
46	GT3	95	(Denmark) GMB Motorsport	4:08.559	
47	GTE	88	(Denmark) GMB Motorsport	4:08.950	
48	LMP3	8	(France) Graff Racing	4:10.870	
49	GT3	70	(Germany) Leipert Motorsport	4:11.033	
50	GT3	76	(France) IMSA LS Group Performance	4:17.614	
51	GT3	42	(United Kingdom) Stellar Motorsport	4:19.292	
52	GT3	63	(Italy) Iron Lynx	4:36.451	
53	LMP3	3	(Luxembourg) DKR Engineering	No Time	
54	LMP3	4	(United Kingdom) Nielsen Racing	No Time	
55	LMP3	14	(Poland) Inter Europol Competition	No Time	
56	GT3	19	(Germany) Leipert Motorsport	No Time	
57	LMP3	67	(Switzerland) Haegeli by T2 Racing	No Time	
58	GT3	83	(Italy) AF Corse	No Time	

== Races ==
=== Race 1 result ===
Pos	Class	No.	Team	Drivers	Chassis	Tyre	Laps	Time/Reason
1	LMP3	58	(Poland) Team Virage	(Portugal) Manuel Espírito Santo (United Kingdom) Martin Rich	Ligier JS P320	MI	11	59:59.979
2	LMP3	4	(United Kingdom) Nielsen Racing	(United Kingdom) Matthew Bell (United States) John Melsom	Duqueine M30 - D08	MI	11	+1.252 s
3	LMP3	77	(Iceland) Team Thor	(Iceland) Auðunn Guðmundsson (United Kingdom) Colin Noble	Ligier JS P320	MI	11	+2.997 s
4	LMP3	97	(Switzerland) Cool Racing	(Switzerland) Luis Sanjuan (Switzerland) David Droux	Ligier JS P320	MI	11	+3.620 s
5	LMP3	12	(Switzerland) Racing Spirit of Léman	(France) Antoine Doquin (France) Jacques Wolff	Ligier JS P320	MI	11	+8.302 s
6	LMP3	6	(France) ANS Motorsport	(Switzerland) Jonathan Brossard (France) Nicholas Schatz	Ligier JS P320	MI	11	+9.065 a
7	LMP3	29	(France) MV2S Racing	(France) Mathis Poulet (Germany) Matthias Lüthen	Ligier JS P320	MI	11	+10.663 s
8	LMP3	16	(Poland) Team Virage	(Algeria) Julien Gerbi (France) Gillian Henrion	Ligier JS P320	MI	11	+10.958 s
9	LMP3	26	(United Kingdom) 360 Racing	(United Kingdom) Tommy Foster (United Kingdom) Terrence Woodward	Ligier JS P320	MI	11	+11.528 s
10	LMP3	87	(Switzerland) Cool Racing	(France) Adrien Chila (Switzerland) Cédric Oltramare	Ligier JS P320	MI	11	+12.376 s
11	LMP3	22	(United Kingdom) United Autosports	(Australia) Scott Andrews (United States) Gerald Kraut	Ligier JS P320	MI	11	+13.155 s
12	LMP3	30	(Germany) Frikadelli Racing Team	(Germany) Klaus Abbelen (Germany) Felipe Fernández Laser	Ligier JS P320	MI	11	+14.079 s
13	LMP3	23	(United Kingdom) United Autosports	(United Kingdom) Wayne Boyd (United States) John Schauerman	Ligier JS P320	MI	11	+18.689 s
14	LMP3	69	(France) M Racing	(Portugal) Miguel Cristóvão (France) Sacha Lehmann	Ligier JS P320	MI	11	+19.276 s
15	LMP3	39	(France) Graff Racing	(Republic of Ireland) Lucca Allen (United Kingdom) James Sweetnam	Ligier JS P320	MI	11	+19.769 s
16	LMP3	68	(France) M Racing	(France) Hugo Delacour (Portugal) Guilherme Oliveira	Ligier JS P320	MI	11	+20.548 s
17	LMP3	25	(United Kingdom) 360 Racing	(Spain) Belén García (United Kingdom) Mark Richards	Ligier JS P320	MI	11	+23.829 s
18	LMP3	7	(United Kingdom) Nielsen Racing	(United Kingdom) Josh Skelton (United Kingdom) Anthony Wells	Duqueine M30 - D08	MI	11	+24.119 s
19	LMP3	66	(Germany) Rinaldi Racing	(Germany) Daniel Keilwitz (Germany) Steve Parrow	Duqueine M30 - D08	MI	11	+27.611 s
20	LMP3	13	(Poland) Inter Europol Competition	(Spain) Santiago Concepción Serrano (United Kingdom) Ben Stone	Ligier JS P320	MI	11	+29.321 s
21	LMP3	17	(France) IDEC Sport	(France) Patrice Lafargue (France) Dino Lunardi	Ligier JS P320	MI	11	+38.052 s
22	GT3	31	(Belgium) Team WRT	(Germany) Max Hesse (United Kingdom) Tim Whale	BMW M4 GT3	MI	11	+39.300 s
23	GT3	86	(Denmark) HCR with CaffeineSix	(United Kingdom) Tim Creswick (Denmark) Anders Fjordbach	Porsche 911 GT3 R (991)	MI	11	+39.880 s
24	LMP3	28	(France) MV2S Racing	(France) Christophe Cresp (Switzerland) Jérôme de Sadeleer	Ligier JS P320	MI	11	+47.596 s
25	GT3	10	(Switzerland) Racing Spirit of Léman	(France) Valentin Hasse-Clot (France) Arnold Robin	Aston Martin Vantage AMR GT3	MI	11	+48.720 s
26	GT3	51	(Italy) AF Corse	(Japan) Kei Cozzolino (Japan) Hiroshi Koizumi	Ferrari 296 GT3	MI	11	+50.683 s
27	GT3	18	(United Kingdom) Team Parker Racing	(United Kingdom) Nick Jones (United Kingdom) Scott Malvern	Porsche 911 GT3 R (992)	MI	11	+51.132 s
28	GT3	88	(Denmark) GMB Motorsport	(Denmark) Jan Magnussen (Denmark) Lars Engelbreckt Pedersen	Honda NSX GT3 Evo22	MI	11	+51.508 s
29	LMP3	67	(Switzerland) Haegeli by T2 Racing	(Belgium) Brent Verheyen (Switzerland) Pieder Decurtins	Duqueine M30 - D08	MI	11	+54.845 s
30	GT3	95	(Denmark) GMB Motorsport	(Denmark) Kristian Poulsen (Denmark) Roland Poulsen	BMW M4 GT3	MI	11	+58.123 s
31	LMP3	21	(United Kingdom) United Autosports	(United States) James McGuire (United Kingdom) Guy Smith	Ligier JS P320	MI	11	+1:01.402
32	LMP3	11	(Spain) CD Sport	(France) Franck Chappard (Lebanon) Shahan Sarkissian	Ligier JS P320	MI	11	+1:02.020
33	GT3	57	(United States) Winward Racing	(United States) George Kurtz (United States) Russell Ward	Mercedes-AMG GT3 Evo	MI	11	+1:02.418
34	GT3	83	(Italy) AF Corse	(France) Emmanuel Collard (France) Charles-Henri Samani	Ferrari 296 GT3	MI	11	+1:03.636
35	GT3	53	(Italy) AF Corse	(Italy) Gino Forgione (Italy) Andrea Montermini	Ferrari 296 GT3	MI	11	+1:03.977
36	LMP3	38	(France) Graff Racing	(China) Haowen Luo (Switzerland) Sébastien Page	Ligier JS P320	MI	11	+1:06.497
37	GT3	19	(Germany) Leipert Motorsport	(Finland) Patrick Kujala (Luxembourg) Gabriel Rindone	Lamborghini Huracán GT3 Evo 2	MI	11	+1:08.173
38	LMP3	27	(United Kingdom) 24-7 Motorsport	(United Kingdom) Andrew Ferguson (United Kingdom) Louis Hamilton-Smith	Ligier JS P320	MI	11	+1:09.463
39	LMP3	8	(France) Graff Racing	(Australia) George Nakas (Australia) Fraser Ross	Ligier JS P320	MI	11	+1:09.502
40	GT3	70	(Germany) Leipert Motorsport	(New Zealand) Brendon Leitch (United States) Gerhard Watzinger	Lamborghini Huracán GT3 Evo 2	MI	11	+1:11.910
41	LMP3	48	(Republic of Ireland) Murphy Prototypes	(Czech Republic) Dan Skočdopole (United Kingdom) Adrian Watt	Duqueine M30 - D08	MI	11	+1.13.073
42	LMP3	15	(Poland) Inter Europol Competition	(United States) Bryson Morris (United Kingdom) Chris Short	Ligier JS P320	MI	11	+1:15.565
43	GT3	46	(Belgium) Team WRT	(France) Jérôme Policand (Italy) Valentino Rossi	BMW M4 GT3	MI	11	+1:17.486
44	GT3	74	(Switzerland) Kessel Racing	(Turkey) Murat Çuhadaroğlu (Italy) David Fumanelli	Ferrari 488 GT3 Evo 2020	MI	11	+1:18.159
45	GT3	42	(United Kingdom) Steller Motorsport	(United Kingdom) Sennan Fielding (United Kingdom) James Wood	Audi R8 LMS Evo II	MI	11	+1:23.516
46	GT3	55	(Denmark) GMB Motorsport	(Denmark) Thomas Andersen (Denmark) Simon Birch	Honda NSX GT3 Evo22	MI	11	1:28.937
47	GT3	76	(France) IMSA LS Group Performance	(United States) Charles Luck (Germany) Marco Seefried	Porsche 911 GT3 R (992)	MI	10	+1 Lap
DNF	LMP3	59	(Poland) Team Virage	(Paraguay) Oscar Bittar (Italy) Alessandro Bracalente	Ligier JS P320	MI	9	+2 Laps
DNF	GT3	64	(United Kingdom) Team Parker Racing	(United Kingdom) Charles Bateman (United Kingdom) Alex Martin	Porsche 911 GT3 R (992)	MI	8	+3 Laps
DNF	GT3	63	(Italy) Iron Lynx	(Monaco) Vincent Abril (Japan) Hiroshi Hamaguchi	Lamborghini Huracán GT3 Evo 2	MI	8	+3 Laps
DNF	LMP3	20	(United Kingdom) United Autosports	(United Kingdom) Andy Meyrick (Brazil) Daniel Schneider	Ligier JS P320	MI	7	+4 Laps
DNF	LMP3	3	(Luxembourg) DKR Engineering	(United Arab Emirates) Alexander Bukhanstov (United Kingdom) James Winslow	Duqueine M30 - D08 - Nissan	MI	5	+6 Laps
DNF	LMP3	33	(Germany) WTM by Rinaldi Racing	(Germany) Torsten Kratz (Germany) Leonard Weiss	Duqueine M30 - D08 - Nissan	MI	1	+10 Laps
DNF	GT3	52	(Italy) AF Corse	(Belgium) Laurent de Meeus (United Kingdom) Jamie Stanley	Ferrari 296 GT3	MI		
DNF	LMP3	5	(Luxembourg) DKR Engineering	(Mozambique) Pedro Perino (Poland) Robin Rogalski	Duqueine M30 - D08 - Nissan	MI		
DNF	LMP3	9	(Switzerland) Racing Spirit of Léman	(Germany) Christian Gisy (Germany) Ralf Kelleners	Ligier JS P320 - Nissan	MI		
DNF	LMP3	2	(Spain) CD Sport	(France) Fabien Michal; Kirill Smal	Ligier JS P320 - Nissan	MI		
DNF	LMP3	14	(Poland) Inter Europol Competition	(Canada) Daniel Ali (Australia) Andres Latorre Canon	Ligier JS P320 - Nissan	MI		

=== Race 2 Result ===
Pos	Class	No.	Team	Drivers	Chassis	Tyre	Laps	Time/Reason
1	LMP3	97	(Switzerland) Cool Racing	(Switzerland) Luis Sanjuan (Switzerland) David Droux	Ligier JS P320	MI	11	58:43.379
2	LMP3	33	(Germany) WTM by Rinaldi Racing	(Germany) Torsten Kratz (Germany) Leonard Weiss	Duqueine M30 - D08 - Nissan	MI	11	+1.769 s
3	LMP3	2	(Spain) CD Sport	(France) Fabien Michal; Kirill Smal	Ligier JS P320 - Nissan	MI	11	+2.574 s
4	LMP3	69	(France) M Racing	(Portugal) Miguel Cristóvão (France) Sacha Lehmann	Ligier JS P320	MI	11	+9.527 s
5	LMP3	22	(United Kingdom) United Autosports	(Australia) Scott Andrews (United States) Gerald Kraut	Ligier JS P320	MI	11	+10.047 s
6	LMP3	26	(United Kingdom) 360 Racing	(United Kingdom) Tommy Foster (United Kingdom) Terrence Woodward	Ligier JS P320	MI	11	+11.591 s
7	LMP3	4	(United Kingdom) Nielsen Racing	(United Kingdom) Matthew Bell (United States) John Melsom	Duqueine M30 - D08	MI	11	+11.834 s
8	LMP3	7	(United Kingdom) Nielsen Racing	(United Kingdom) Josh Skelton (United Kingdom) Anthony Wells	Duqueine M30 - D08	MI	11	+14.666 s
9	LMP3	17	(France) IDEC Sport	(France) Patrice Lafargue (France) Dino Lunardi	Ligier JS P320	MI	11	+15.743 s
10	LMP3	6	(France) ANS Motorsport	(Switzerland) Jonathan Brossard (France) Nicholas Schatz	Ligier JS P320	MI	11	+16.910 s
11	LMP3	28	(France) MV2S Racing	(France) Christophe Cresp (Switzerland) Jérôme de Sadeleer	Ligier JS P320	MI	11	+17.827 s
12	LMP3	15	(Poland) Inter Europol Competition	(United States) Bryson Morris (United Kingdom) Chris Short	Ligier JS P320	MI	11	+21.055 s
13	LMP3	25	(United Kingdom) 360 Racing	(Spain) Belén García (United Kingdom) Mark Richards	Ligier JS P320	MI	11	+23.895 s
14	LMP3	5	(Luxembourg) DKR Engineering	(Mozambique) Pedro Perino (Poland) Robin Rogalski	Duqueine M30 - D08 - Nissan	MI	11	+24.116 s
15	LMP3	77	(Iceland) Team Thor	(Iceland) Auðunn Guðmundsson (United Kingdom) Colin Noble	Ligier JS P320	MI	11	+32.433 s
16	LMP3	9	(Switzerland) Racing Spirit of Léman	(Germany) Christian Gisy (Germany) Ralf Kelleners	Ligier JS P320 - Nissan	MI	11	+33.578 s
17	LMP3	58	(Poland) Team Virage	(Portugal) Manuel Espírito Santo (United Kingdom) Martin Rich	Ligier JS P320	MI	11	+35.043 s
18	LMP3	21	(United Kingdom) United Autosports	(United States) James McGuire (United Kingdom) Guy Smith	Ligier JS P320	MI	11	+36.522 s
19	LMP3	23	(United Kingdom) United Autosports	(United Kingdom) Wayne Boyd (United States) John Schauerman	Ligier JS P320	MI	11	+41.822 s
20	LMP3	68	(France) M Racing	(France) Hugo Delacour (Portugal) Guilherme Oliveira	Ligier JS P320	MI	11	+42.153 s
21	GT3	46	(Belgium) Team WRT	(France) Jérôme Policand (Italy) Valentino Rossi	BMW M4 GT3	MI	11	+42.420 s
22	LMP3	59	(Poland) Team Virage	(Paraguay) Oscar Bittar (Italy) Alessandro Bracalente	Ligier JS P320	MI	11	+43.809 s
23	GT3	31	(Belgium) Team WRT	(Germany) Max Hesse (United Kingdom) Tim Whale	BMW M4 GT3	MI	11	+44.626 s
24	LMP3	27	(United Kingdom) 24-7 Motorsport	(United Kingdom) Andrew Ferguson (United Kingdom) Louis Hamilton-Smith	Ligier JS P320	MI	11	+45.692 s
25	GT3	57	(United States) Winward Racing	(United States) George Kurtz (United States) Russell Ward	Mercedes-AMG GT3 Evo	MI	11	+49.418 s
26	GT3	86	(Denmark) HCR with CaffeineSix	(United Kingdom) Tim Creswick (Denmark) Anders Fjordbach	Porsche 911 GT3 R (991)	MI	11	+51.500 s
27	GT3	70	(Germany) Leipert Motorsport	(New Zealand) Brendon Leitch (United States) Gerhard Watzinger	Lamborghini Huracán GT3 Evo 2	MI	11	+51.954 s
28	GT3	88	(Denmark) GMB Motorsport	(Denmark) Jan Magnussen (Denmark) Lars Engelbreckt Pedersen	Honda NSX GT3 Evo22	MI	11	+52.255 s
29	GT3	19	(Germany) Leipert Motorsport	(Finland) Patrick Kujala (Luxembourg) Gabriel Rindone	Lamborghini Huracán GT3 Evo 2	MI	11	+52.483 s
30	GT3	55	(Denmark) GMB Motorsport	(Denmark) Thomas Andersen (Denmark) Simon Birch	Honda NSX GT3 Evo22	MI	11	+52.684 s
31	LMP3	67	(Switzerland) Haegeli by T2 Racing	(Belgium) Brent Verheyen (Switzerland) Pieder Decurtins	Duqueine M30 - D08	MI	11	+53.023 s
32	LMP3	66	(Germany) Rinaldi Racing	(Germany) Daniel Keilwitz (Germany) Steve Parrow	Duqueine M30 - D08	MI	11	+54.135
33	GT3	53	(Italy) AF Corse	(Italy) Gino Forgione (Italy) Andrea Montermini	Ferrari 296 GT3	MI	11	+54.746 s
34	GT3	42	(United Kingdom) Steller Motorsport	(United Kingdom) Sennan Fielding (United Kingdom) James Wood	Audi R8 LMS Evo II	MI	11	+54.941 s
35	GT3	18	(United Kingdom) Team Parker Racing	(United Kingdom) Nick Jones (United Kingdom) Scott Malvern	Porsche 911 GT3 R (992)	MI	11	+55.389 s
36	GT3	83	(Italy) AF Corse	(France) Emmanuel Collard (France) Charles-Henri Samani	Ferrari 296 GT3	MI	11	+55.620 s
37	LMP3	14	(Poland) Inter Europol Competition	(Canada) Daniel Ali (Australia) Andres Latorre Canon	Ligier JS P320 - Nissan	MI	11	+56.832 s
38	LMP3	30	(Germany) Frikadelli Racing Team	(Germany) Klaus Abbelen (Germany) Felipe Fernández Laser	Ligier JS P320	MI	11	+59.583 s
39	LMP3	38	(France) Graff Racing	(China) Haowen Luo (Switzerland) Sébastien Page	Ligier JS P320	MI	11	+1:02.201
40	GT3	10	(Switzerland) Racing Spirit of Léman	(France) Valentin Hasse-Clot (France) Arnold Robin	Aston Martin Vantage AMR GT3	MI	11	+1:02.405
41	GT3	74	(Switzerland) Kessel Racing	(Turkey) Murat Çuhadaroğlu (Italy) David Fumanelli	Ferrari 488 GT3 Evo 2020	MI	11	+1:02.663
42	LMP3	11	(Spain) CD Sport	(France) Franck Chappard (Lebanon) Shahan Sarkissian	Ligier JS P320	MI	11	+1:03.473
43	LMP3	3	(Luxembourg) DKR Engineering	(United Arab Emirates) Alexander Bukhanstov (United Kingdom) James Winslow	Duqueine M30 - D08 - Nissan	MI	11	+1:04.455
44	GT3	95	(Denmark) GMB Motorsport	(Denmark) Kristian Poulsen (Denmark) Roland Poulsen	BMW M4 GT3	MI	11	+1:05.064
45	GT3	51	(Italy) AF Corse	(Japan) Kei Cozzolino (Japan) Hiroshi Koizumi	Ferrari 296 GT3	MI	11	+1:05.752
46	LMP3	48	(Republic of Ireland) Murphy Prototypes	(Czech Republic) Dan Skočdopole (United Kingdom) Adrian Watt	Duqueine M30 - D08	MI	11	+1:20.009
47	GT3	76	(France) IMSA LS Group Performance	(United States) Charles Luck (Germany) Marco Seefried	Porsche 911 GT3 R (992)	MI	11	+1:38.496
48	LMP3	8	(France) Graff Racing	(Australia) George Nakas (Australia) Fraser Ross	Ligier JS P320	MI	11	+1:45.993
49	GT3	52	(Italy) AF Corse	(Belgium) Laurent de Meeus (United Kingdom) Jamie Stanley	Ferrari 296 GT3	MI	10	+1 Lap
DNF	LMP3	87	(Switzerland) Cool Racing	(France) Adrien Chila (Switzerland) Cédric Oltramare	Ligier JS P320	MI	10	+1 Lap
DNF	GT3	63	(Italy) Iron Lynx	(Monaco) Vincent Abril (Japan) Hiroshi Hamaguchi	Lamborghini Huracán GT3 Evo 2	MI	8	+3 Laps
DNF	LMP3	13	(Poland) Inter Europol Competition	(Spain) Santiago Concepción Serrano (United Kingdom) Ben Stone	Ligier JS P320	MI	6	+5 Laps
DNF	LMP3	29	(France) MV2S Racing	(France) Mathis Poulet (Germany) Matthias Lüthen	Ligier JS P320	MI	6	+5 Laps
DNF	LMP3	12	(Switzerland) Racing Spirit of Léman	(France) Antoine Doquin (France) Jacques Wolff	Ligier JS P320	MI	3	+8 Laps
DNF	LMP3	39	(France) Graff Racing	(Republic of Ireland) Lucca Allen (United Kingdom) James Sweetnam	Ligier JS P320	MI	3	+8 Laps
DNF	LMP3	16	(Poland) Team Virage	(Algeria) Julien Gerbi (France) Gillian Henrion	Ligier JS P320	MI	1	+10 Laps
DNF	LMP3	20	(United Kingdom) United Autosports	(United Kingdom) Andy Meyrick (Brazil) Daniel Schneider	Ligier JS P320	MI		
DNF	GT3	64	(United Kingdom) Team Parker Racing	(United Kingdom) Charles Bateman (United Kingdom) Alex Martin	Porsche 911 GT3 R (992)	MI		
