= 2023 Le Mans Cup =

French automobile endurance race

The 2023 Le Mans Cup, known as the 2023 Michelin Le Mans Cup under sponsorship, was the eighth season of the Le Mans Cup. The six-event season began at the Circuit de Barcelona-Catalunya on 22 April and finished at the Algarve International Circuit on 22 October. The series is open to Le Mans Prototypes in the LMP3 class, and grand tourer sports cars in the GT3 class.

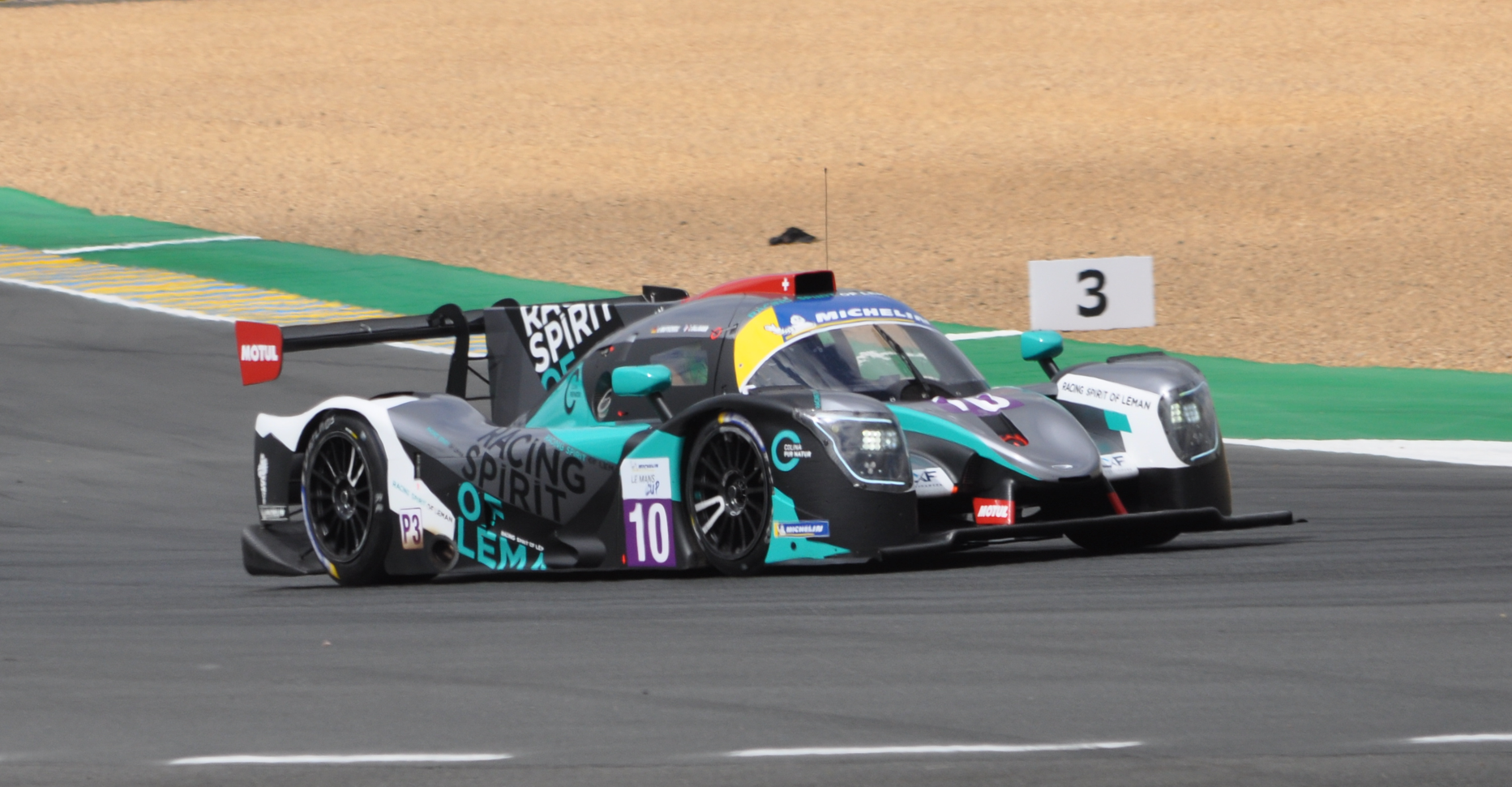
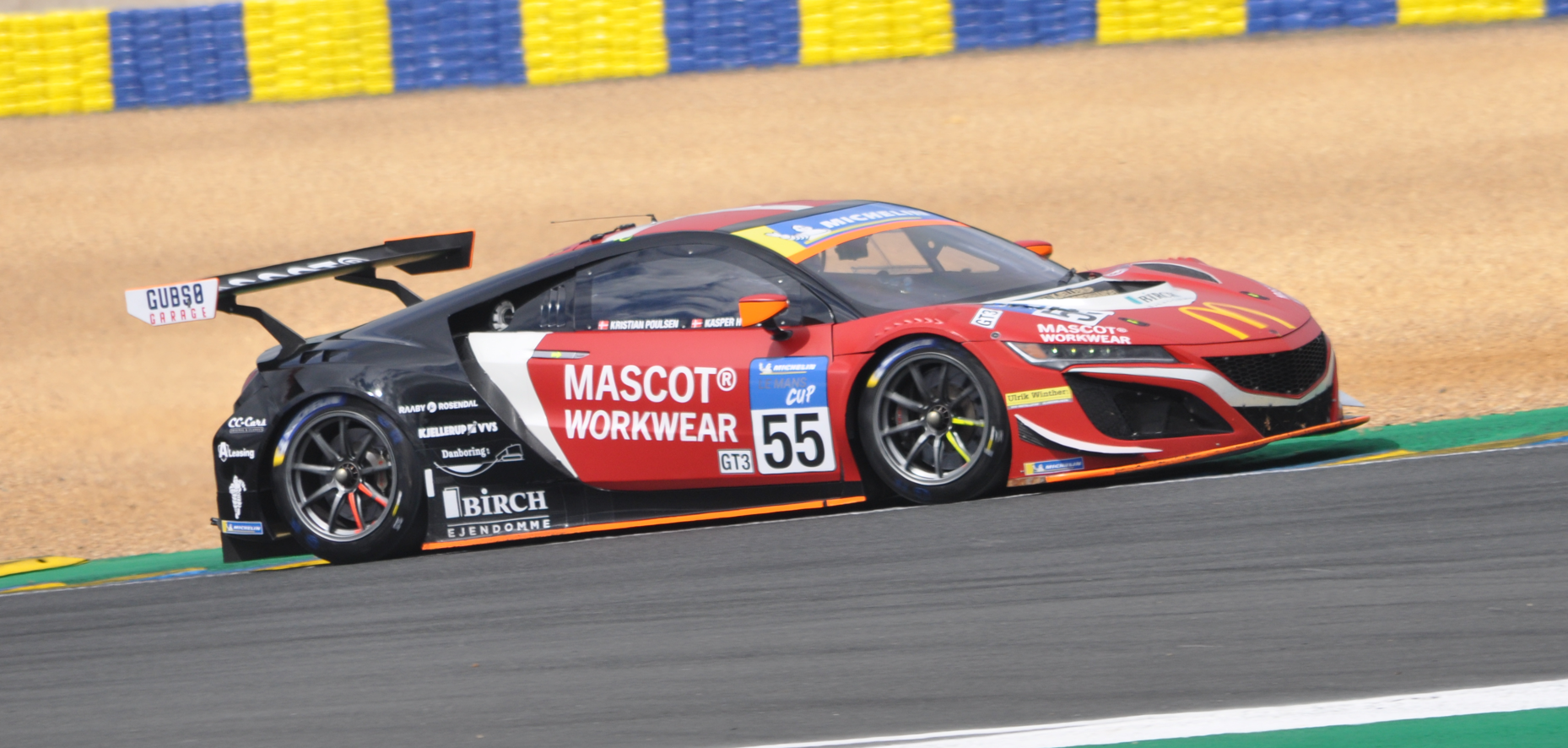
Racing Spirit of Léman are the reigning champions in LMP3 whilst GMB Motorsport are the defending teams' champion in GT3.

== Calendar ==
The provisional calendar for the 2023 season was announced on 22 September 2022. On the 11th of April it was announced the 4 Hours of Imola would be postponed due to ongoing works on the pit lane and paddock areas. On the 14th of April it was announced that Imola round would be cancelled and Aragón round would be added.

Rnd	Circuit	Location	Race Length	Date
1	(Spain) Circuit de Barcelona-Catalunya	Montmeló, Spain	1 hour, 50 mins	22 April
2	(France) Circuit de la Sarthe	Le Mans, France	55 minutes	8 June
2	(France) Circuit de la Sarthe	Le Mans, France	55 minutes	9 June
3	(France) Circuit Paul Ricard	Le Castellet, France	1 hour, 50 mins	15 July
4	(Spain) MotorLand Aragón	Alcañiz, Spain	1 hour, 50 mins	25 August
5	(Belgium) Circuit de Spa-Francorchamps	Stavelot, Belgium	1 hour, 50 mins	23 September
6	(Portugal) Algarve International Circuit	Portimão, Portugal	1 hour, 50 mins	22 October
Cancelled
	Circuit	Location	Race Length	Original date
	(Italy) Imola Circuit	Imola, Italy	1 hour, 50 mins	6 May

== Entries ==
=== LMP3 ===
All cars in the LMP3 class used the 2020 spec Nissan VK56DE 5.6L V8 engine and Michelin tyres. The new-for-2022 race length of 1h 50m removes the need for the additional mandatory stop that was introduced in 2020 to mitigate unexpected higher fuel consumption.

Entrant/Team	Chassis	No.	Drivers	Rounds
(Spain) CD Sport	Ligier JS P320	2	(France) Fabien Michal	All
(Spain) CD Sport	Ligier JS P320	2	Kirill Smal (Note: Smal is Russian, but he competes as a neutral competitor as Russian national emblems were banned by the FIA following the Russian invasion of Ukraine. Bukhantsov, also a Russian, competes under an Emirati licence for the same reason.)	All
(Spain) CD Sport	Ligier JS P320	11	(France) Franck Chappard	All
(Spain) CD Sport	Ligier JS P320	11	(Lebanon) Shahan Sarkissian	All
(Luxembourg) DKR Engineering	Duqueine M30 - D08	3	(United Arab Emirates) Alexander Bukhantsov	All
(Luxembourg) DKR Engineering	Duqueine M30 - D08	3	(United Kingdom) James Winslow	All
(Luxembourg) DKR Engineering	Duqueine M30 - D08	5	(Sweden) Sebastian Arenram	2
(Luxembourg) DKR Engineering	Duqueine M30 - D08	5	(Poland) Robin Rogalski	2
(United Kingdom) Nielsen Racing	Duqueine M30 - D08	4	(United Kingdom) Matt Bell	All
(United Kingdom) Nielsen Racing	Duqueine M30 - D08	4	(United States) John Melsom	All
(United Kingdom) Nielsen Racing	Ligier JS P320	7	(United Kingdom) Josh Skelton	All
(United Kingdom) Nielsen Racing	Ligier JS P320	7	(United Kingdom) Anthony Wells	All
(France) ANS Motorsport	Ligier JS P320	6	(Switzerland) Jonathan Brossard	All
(France) ANS Motorsport	Ligier JS P320	6	(France) Nicolas Schatz	All
(France) Graff Racing	Ligier JS P320	8	(Australia) George Nakas	All
(France) Graff Racing	Ligier JS P320	8	(Australia) Fraser Ross	All
(France) Graff Racing	Ligier JS P320	38	(China) Haowen Luo	2
(France) Graff Racing	Ligier JS P320	38	(Switzerland) Sébastien Page	2
(France) Graff Racing	Ligier JS P320	39	(United Kingdom) James Sweetnam	All
(France) Graff Racing	Ligier JS P320	39	(Republic of Ireland) Lucca Allen	1–2
(France) Graff Racing	Ligier JS P320	39	(France) Paul Trojani	3
(France) Graff Racing	Ligier JS P320	39	(Spain) Xavier Lloveras	4
(France) Graff Racing	Ligier JS P320	39	(Switzerland) Samir Ben	5–6
(Switzerland) Racing Spirit of Léman	Ligier JS P320	9	(Germany) Christian Gisy	1–3, 5–6
(Switzerland) Racing Spirit of Léman	Ligier JS P320	9	(Germany) Ralf Kelleners	1–3, 5–6
(Switzerland) Racing Spirit of Léman	Ligier JS P320	9	(France) Antoine Doquin	4
(Switzerland) Racing Spirit of Léman	Ligier JS P320	9	(France) Jean-Ludovic Foubert	4
(Switzerland) Racing Spirit of Léman	Ligier JS P320	12	(France) Antoine Doquin	2
(Switzerland) Racing Spirit of Léman	Ligier JS P320	12	(France) Jacques Wolff	2
(Poland) Inter Europol Competition	Ligier JS P320	13	(Spain) Santiago Concepción Serrano	All
(Poland) Inter Europol Competition	Ligier JS P320	13	(United Kingdom) Ben Stone	All
(Poland) Inter Europol Competition	Ligier JS P320	14	(Canada) Daniel Ali	All
(Poland) Inter Europol Competition	Ligier JS P320	14	(Australia) Andres Latorre Canon	All
(Poland) Inter Europol Competition	Ligier JS P320	15	(United States) Bryson Morris	All
(Poland) Inter Europol Competition	Ligier JS P320	15	(United Kingdom) Chris Short	All
(Poland) Team Virage	Ligier JS P320	16	(Spain) Julien Gerbi	All
(Poland) Team Virage	Ligier JS P320	16	(France) Gillian Henrion	All
(Poland) Team Virage	Ligier JS P320	58	(Portugal) Manuel Espírito Santo	2
(Poland) Team Virage	Ligier JS P320	58	(United Kingdom) Martin Rich	2
(Poland) Team Virage	Ligier JS P320	59	(Paraguay) Oscar Bittar	All
(Poland) Team Virage	Ligier JS P320	59	(Italy) Alessandro Bracalente	All
(France) IDEC Sport	Ligier JS P320	17	(France) Patrice Lafargue	1–4, 6
(France) IDEC Sport	Ligier JS P320	17	(France) Dino Lunardi	1–4, 6
(United Kingdom) United Autosports	Ligier JS P320	20	(United Kingdom) Andy Meyrick	2
(United Kingdom) United Autosports	Ligier JS P320	20	(Brazil) Daniel Schneider	2
(United Kingdom) United Autosports	Ligier JS P320	21	(United States) Jim McGuire	2
(United Kingdom) United Autosports	Ligier JS P320	21	(United Kingdom) Guy Smith	2
(United Kingdom) United Autosports	Ligier JS P320	22	(Australia) Scott Andrews	1–3, 5–6
(United Kingdom) United Autosports	Ligier JS P320	22	(United States) Gerald Kraut	1–3, 5–6
(United Kingdom) United Autosports	Ligier JS P320	22	(United Kingdom) Josh Caygill	4
(United Kingdom) United Autosports	Ligier JS P320	22	(Australia) Garnet Patterson	4
(United Kingdom) United Autosports	Ligier JS P320	23	(United Kingdom) Wayne Boyd	All
(United Kingdom) United Autosports	Ligier JS P320	23	(United States) John Schauerman	All
(United Kingdom) 360 Racing	Ligier JS P320	25	(Spain) Belén García	All
(United Kingdom) 360 Racing	Ligier JS P320	25	(United Kingdom) Mark Richards	1–2, 4–6
(United Kingdom) 360 Racing	Ligier JS P320	25	(Canada) James Dayson	3
(United Kingdom) 360 Racing	Ligier JS P320	26	(United Kingdom) Tommy Foster	All
(United Kingdom) 360 Racing	Ligier JS P320	26	(United Kingdom) Terrence Woodward	All
(United Kingdom) 24-7 Motorsport	Ligier JS P320	27	(United Kingdom) Andrew Ferguson	All
(United Kingdom) 24-7 Motorsport	Ligier JS P320	27	(United Kingdom) Louis Hamilton-Smith	All
(France) MV2S Racing	Ligier JS P320	28	(France) Christophe Cresp	All
(France) MV2S Racing	Ligier JS P320	28	(Switzerland) Jérôme de Sadeleer	All
(France) MV2S Racing	Ligier JS P320	29	(Germany) Matthias Lüthen	1–4
(France) MV2S Racing	Ligier JS P320	29	(France) Emilien Carde	1, 3–6
(France) MV2S Racing	Ligier JS P320	29	(France) Mathis Poulet	2
(France) MV2S Racing	Ligier JS P320	29	(France) Philippe Cimadomo	5–6
(Germany) Frikadelli Racing Team	Ligier JS P320	30	(Germany) Klaus Abbelen	1–4
(Germany) Frikadelli Racing Team	Ligier JS P320	30	(Germany) Felipe Fernández Laser	1–4
(Germany) / WTM by Rinaldi Racing (Note: Car No. 33 entered as WTM by Rinaldi Racing, car No. 66 entered as Rinaldi Racing.); (Germany) / Rinaldi Racing	Duqueine M30 - D08	33	(Germany) Torsten Kratz	2
(Germany) / WTM by Rinaldi Racing; (Germany) / Rinaldi Racing	Duqueine M30 - D08	33	(Germany) Leonard Weiss	2
(Germany) / WTM by Rinaldi Racing; (Germany) / Rinaldi Racing	Ligier JS P320	66	(Germany) Daniel Keilwitz	All
(Germany) / WTM by Rinaldi Racing; (Germany) / Rinaldi Racing	Ligier JS P320	66	(Germany) Steve Parrow	All
(Republic of Ireland) Murphy Prototypes	Duqueine M30 - D08	48	(United Kingdom) Adrian Watt	1–3
(Republic of Ireland) Murphy Prototypes	Duqueine M30 - D08	48	(Czech Republic) Dan Skočdopole	1–2
(Republic of Ireland) Murphy Prototypes	Duqueine M30 - D08	48	(United Kingdom) Will Powell	3
(Republic of Ireland) Murphy Prototypes	Duqueine M30 - D08	48	(United Kingdom) Will Bratt	4–5
(Republic of Ireland) Murphy Prototypes	Duqueine M30 - D08	48	(Germany) Torsten Kratz	4, 6
(Republic of Ireland) Murphy Prototypes	Duqueine M30 - D08	48	(United Kingdom) Josh Caygill	5
(Republic of Ireland) Murphy Prototypes	Duqueine M30 - D08	48	(Brazil) Enzo Elias	6
(Switzerland) Haegeli by T2 Racing	Duqueine M30 - D08	67	(Switzerland) Pieder Decurtins	1–3, 5–6
(Switzerland) Haegeli by T2 Racing	Duqueine M30 - D08	67	(Belgium) Brent Verheyen	1–3, 5–6
(France) M Racing	Ligier JS P320	68	(France) Hugo Delacour	1–2
(France) M Racing	Ligier JS P320	68	(Portugal) Guilherme Oliveira	1–2
(France) M Racing	Ligier JS P320	68	(France) Sacha Lehmann	3–5
(France) M Racing	Ligier JS P320	68	(Portugal) Miguel Cristóvão	3
(France) M Racing	Ligier JS P320	68	(France) Erwin Creed	4–5
(France) M Racing	Ligier JS P320	69	(Portugal) Miguel Cristóvão	2
(France) M Racing	Ligier JS P320	69	(France) Sacha Lehmann	2
(Iceland) Team Thor	Ligier JS P320	77	(Iceland) Auðunn Guðmundsson	All
(Iceland) Team Thor	Ligier JS P320	77	(United Kingdom) Colin Noble	All
(Switzerland) Cool Racing	Ligier JS P320	87	(France) Adrien Chila	All
(Switzerland) Cool Racing	Ligier JS P320	87	(Switzerland) Cédric Oltramare	All
(Switzerland) Cool Racing	Ligier JS P320	97	(Switzerland) David Droux	All
(Switzerland) Cool Racing	Ligier JS P320	97	(Switzerland) Luis Sanjuan	All

=== GT3 ===
Entrant/Team	Chassis	Engine	No.	Drivers	Rounds
(Switzerland) Racing Spirit of Léman	Aston Martin Vantage AMR GT3	Aston Martin 4.0 L Turbo V8	10	(France) Valentin Hasse-Clot	All
(Switzerland) Racing Spirit of Léman	Aston Martin Vantage AMR GT3	Aston Martin 4.0 L Turbo V8	10	(France) Arnold Robin	All
(United Kingdom) Team Parker Racing	Porsche 911 GT3 R (992)	Porsche 4.2 L Flat-6	18	(United Kingdom) Nick Jones	All
(United Kingdom) Team Parker Racing	Porsche 911 GT3 R (992)	Porsche 4.2 L Flat-6	18	(United Kingdom) Scott Malvern	All
(United Kingdom) Team Parker Racing	Porsche 911 GT3 R (991.2)	Porsche 4.0 L Flat-6	64	(United Kingdom) Charles Bateman	All
(United Kingdom) Team Parker Racing	Porsche 911 GT3 R (991.2)	Porsche 4.0 L Flat-6	64	(United Kingdom) Alex Martin	All
(Germany) Leipert Motorsport	Lamborghini Huracán GT3 Evo 2	Lamborghini 5.2 L V10	19	(Finland) Patrick Kujala	All
(Germany) Leipert Motorsport	Lamborghini Huracán GT3 Evo 2	Lamborghini 5.2 L V10	19	(Luxembourg) Gabriel Rindone	All
(Germany) Leipert Motorsport	Lamborghini Huracán GT3 Evo 2	Lamborghini 5.2 L V10	70	(New Zealand) Brendon Leitch	1–4
(Germany) Leipert Motorsport	Lamborghini Huracán GT3 Evo 2	Lamborghini 5.2 L V10	70	(United States) Gerhard Watzinger	1–4
(Germany) Leipert Motorsport	Lamborghini Huracán GT3 Evo	Lamborghini 5.2 L V10	24	(New Zealand) Brendon Leitch	6
(Germany) Leipert Motorsport	Lamborghini Huracán GT3 Evo	Lamborghini 5.2 L V10	24	(United States) Gregg Gorski	6
(Belgium) Team WRT	BMW M4 GT3	BMW S58B30T0 3.0 L Turbo I6	31	(Germany) Max Hesse	2
(Belgium) Team WRT	BMW M4 GT3	BMW S58B30T0 3.0 L Turbo I6	31	(United Kingdom) Tim Whale	2
(Belgium) Team WRT	BMW M4 GT3	BMW S58B30T0 3.0 L Turbo I6	46	(France) Jérôme Policand	2
(Belgium) Team WRT	BMW M4 GT3	BMW S58B30T0 3.0 L Turbo I6	46	(Italy) Valentino Rossi	2
(United Kingdom) Steller Motorsport	Audi R8 LMS Evo II	Audi 5.2 L V10	42	(United Kingdom) Sennan Fielding	All
(United Kingdom) Steller Motorsport	Audi R8 LMS Evo II	Audi 5.2 L V10	42	(United Kingdom) James Wood	1–3
(United Kingdom) Steller Motorsport	Audi R8 LMS Evo II	Audi 5.2 L V10	42	(United Kingdom) Mark Cole	4–5
(United Kingdom) Steller Motorsport	Audi R8 LMS Evo II	Audi 5.2 L V10	42	(France) Sylvain Guintoli	6
(Italy) AF Corse	Ferrari 296 GT3	Ferrari 3.0 L Turbo V6	51	(Japan) Kei Cozzolino	All
(Italy) AF Corse	Ferrari 296 GT3	Ferrari 3.0 L Turbo V6	51	(Japan) Hiroshi Koizumi	All
(Italy) AF Corse	Ferrari 296 GT3	Ferrari 3.0 L Turbo V6	83	(France) Emmanuel Collard	All
(Italy) AF Corse	Ferrari 296 GT3	Ferrari 3.0 L Turbo V6	83	(France) Charles-Henri Samani	All
(Italy) AF Corse	Ferrari 488 GT3 Evo 2020	Ferrari F154CB 3.9 L Turbo V8	52	(Belgium) Laurent de Meeus	2
(Italy) AF Corse	Ferrari 488 GT3 Evo 2020	Ferrari F154CB 3.9 L Turbo V8	52	(United Kingdom) Jamie Stanley	2
(Italy) AF Corse	Ferrari 488 GT3 Evo 2020	Ferrari F154CB 3.9 L Turbo V8	53	(Italy) Gino Forgione	2
(Italy) AF Corse	Ferrari 488 GT3 Evo 2020	Ferrari F154CB 3.9 L Turbo V8	53	(Italy) Andrea Montermini	2
(Denmark) GMB Motorsport	Honda NSX GT3 Evo22	Honda 3.5 L Turbo V6	55	(Denmark) Thomas Andersen	All
(Denmark) GMB Motorsport	Honda NSX GT3 Evo22	Honda 3.5 L Turbo V6	55	(Denmark) Simon Birch	All
(Denmark) GMB Motorsport	Honda NSX GT3 Evo22	Honda 3.5 L Turbo V6	88	(Denmark) Jan Magnussen	All
(Denmark) GMB Motorsport	Honda NSX GT3 Evo22	Honda 3.5 L Turbo V6	88	(Denmark) Lars Engelbreckt Pedersen	All
(Denmark) GMB Motorsport	BMW M4 GT3	BMW S58B30T0 3.0 L Turbo I6	95	(Denmark) Kristian Poulsen	2
(Denmark) GMB Motorsport	BMW M4 GT3	BMW S58B30T0 3.0 L Turbo I6	95	(Denmark) Roland Poulsen	2
(United States) Winward Racing	Mercedes-AMG GT3 Evo	Mercedes-AMG M159 6.2 L V8	57	(United States) George Kurtz	2
(United States) Winward Racing	Mercedes-AMG GT3 Evo	Mercedes-AMG M159 6.2 L V8	57	(United States) Russell Ward	2
(Italy) Iron Lynx	Lamborghini Huracán GT3 Evo 2	Lamborghini 5.2 L V10	63	(Japan) Hiroshi Hamaguchi	1–3, 5–6
(Italy) Iron Lynx	Lamborghini Huracán GT3 Evo 2	Lamborghini 5.2 L V10	63	(Monaco) Vincent Abril	1–3, 5–6
(Switzerland) Kessel Racing	Ferrari 488 GT3 Evo 2020	Ferrari F154CB 3.9 L Turbo V8	74	(Turkey) Murat Çuhadaroğlu	2
(Switzerland) Kessel Racing	Ferrari 488 GT3 Evo 2020	Ferrari F154CB 3.9 L Turbo V8	74	(Italy) David Fumanelli	2
(France) IMSA LS Group Performance	Porsche 911 GT3 R (992)	Porsche 4.2 L Flat-6	76	(United States) Charlie Luck	2
(France) IMSA LS Group Performance	Porsche 911 GT3 R (992)	Porsche 4.2 L Flat-6	76	(Germany) Marco Seefried	2
(Denmark) HCR with CaffeineSix	Porsche 911 GT3 R (991.2)	Porsche 4.0 L Flat-6	86	(United Kingdom) Tim Creswick	All
(Denmark) HCR with CaffeineSix	Porsche 911 GT3 R (991.2)	Porsche 4.0 L Flat-6	86	(Denmark) Anders Fjordbach	All

- Leonardo Pulcini was scheduled to compete for Iron Lynx but did not appear in any rounds.

== Race results ==
Bold indicates the overall winner.

Round		Circuit	LMP3 Winners	GT3 Winners
1		(Spain) Catalunya	**(Poland) No. 16 Team Virage**	(Switzerland) No. 10 Racing Spirit of Léman
1		(Spain) Catalunya	**(Spain) Julien Gerbi** **(France) Gillian Henrion**	(France) Valentin Hasse-Clot (France) Arnold Robin
2	R1	(France) Le Mans (report)	**(United Kingdom) No. 4 Nielsen Racing**	(Belgium) No. 31 Team WRT
2	R1	(France) Le Mans (report)	**(United Kingdom) Matt Bell** **(United States) John Melsom**	(Germany) Max Hesse (United Kingdom) Tim Whale
2	R2	(France) Le Mans (report)	**(Switzerland) No. 97 Cool Racing**	(Belgium) No. 46 Team WRT
2	R2	(France) Le Mans (report)	**(Switzerland) David Droux** **(Switzerland) Luis Sanjuan**	(France) Jérôme Policand (Italy) Valentino Rossi
3		(France) Le Castellet	**(Poland) No. 16 Team Virage**	(Germany) No. 19 Leipert Motorsport
3		(France) Le Castellet	**(Spain) Julien Gerbi** **(France) Gillian Henrion**	(Finland) Patrick Kujala (Luxembourg) Gabriel Rindone
4		(Spain) Aragón	**(United Kingdom) No. 4 Nielsen Racing**	(Italy) No. 51 AF Corse
4		(Spain) Aragón	**(United Kingdom) Matt Bell** **(United States) John Melsom**	(Japan) Kei Cozzolino (Japan) Hiroshi Koizumi
5		(Belgium) Spa-Francorchamps	**(United Kingdom) No. 23 United Autosports**	(United Kingdom) No. 42 Steller Motorsport
5		(Belgium) Spa-Francorchamps	**(United Kingdom) Wayne Boyd** **(United States) John Schauerman**	(United Kingdom) Mark Cole (United Kingdom) Sennan Fielding
6		(Portugal) Portimão	**(United Kingdom) No. 7 Nielsen Racing**	(Italy) No. 63 Iron Lynx
6		(Portugal) Portimão	**(United Kingdom) Josh Skelton** **(United Kingdom) Anthony Wells**	(Monaco) Vincent Abril (Japan) Hiroshi Hamaguchi

== Championship standings ==
Points are awarded according to the following structure:

Position	1st	2nd	3rd	4th	5th	6th	7th	8th	9th	10th	Pole
Points	25	18	15	12	10	8	6	4	2	1	1
Le Mans	15	9	7	6	5	4	3	2	1		1

=== LMP3 Drivers Championship ===
Pos.	Driver	Team	BAR (Spain)	LMS (France)		LEC (France)	ARA (Spain)	SPA (Belgium)	POR (Portugal)	Points
1	(Algeria) Julien Gerbi	(Poland) Team Virage	1	8	Ret	1	2	18	**21**	73
1	(France) Gillian Henrion	(Poland) Team Virage	1	8	Ret	1	2	18	**21**	73
2	(France) Fabien Michal	(Spain) CD Sport	3	Ret	**3**	19	6	2	2	69
2	Kirill Smal	(Spain) CD Sport	3	Ret	**3**	19	6	2	2	69
3	(Iceland) Auðunn Guðmundsson	(Iceland) Team Thor	4	2	15	3	3	14	6	59
3	(United Kingdom) Colin Noble	(Iceland) Team Thor	4	2	15	3	3	14	6	59
4	(United Kingdom) Matt Bell	(United Kingdom) Nielsen Racing	Ret	1	7	11	1	Ret	Ret	45
4	(United States) John Melsom	(United Kingdom) Nielsen Racing	Ret	1	7	11	1	Ret	Ret	45
5	(France) Adrien Chila	(Switzerland) Cool Racing	6	10	Ret	**2**	4	Ret	10	42
5	(Switzerland) Cédric Oltramare	(Switzerland) Cool Racing	6	10	Ret	**2**	4	Ret	10	42
6	(United Kingdom) Tommy Foster	(United Kingdom) 360 Racing	5	9	6	6	17	15	4	39
6	(United Kingdom) Terrence Woodward	(United Kingdom) 360 Racing	5	9	6	6	17	15	4	39
7	(Switzerland) David Droux	(Switzerland) Cool Racing	20	3	1	8	7	7	20	38
7	(Switzerland) Luis Sanjuan	(Switzerland) Cool Racing	20	3	1	8	7	7	20	38
8	(United Kingdom) Wayne Boyd	(United Kingdom) United Autosports	16	13	19	5	Ret	1	22	35
8	(United States) John Schauerman	(United Kingdom) United Autosports	16	13	19	5	Ret	1	22	35
9	(United Kingdom) Josh Skelton	(United Kingdom) Nielsen Racing	Ret	18	8	23	Ret	**Ret**	1	30
9	(United Kingdom) Anthony Wells	(United Kingdom) Nielsen Racing	Ret	18	8	23	Ret	**Ret**	1	30
10	(Spain) Belén García	(United Kingdom) 360 Racing	15	17	13	13	5	5	5	30
10	(United Kingdom) Mark Richards	(United Kingdom) 360 Racing	15	17	13		5	5	5	30
11	(France) Franck Chappard	(Spain) CD Sport	14	25	28	7	14	Ret	3	21
11	(Lebanon) Shahan Sarkissian	(Spain) CD Sport	14	25	28	7	14	Ret	3	21
12	(France) Hugo Delacour	(France) M Racing	2	16	20					18
12	(Portugal) Guilherme Oliveira	(France) M Racing	2	16	20					18
13	(United Arab Emirates) Alexander Bukhantsov	(Luxembourg) DKR Engineering	9	Ret	29	4	Ret	8	26†	18
13	(United Kingdom) James Winslow	(Luxembourg) DKR Engineering	9	Ret	29	4	Ret	8	26†	18
14	(France) Christophe Cresp	(France) MV2S Racing	23	22	11	17	21	3	Ret	16
14	(Switzerland) Jérôme de Sadeleer	(France) MV2S Racing	23	22	11	17	21	3	Ret	16
15	(Germany) Daniel Keilwitz	(Germany) Rinaldi Racing	Ret	19	24	10	10	4	15	14
15	(Germany) Steve Parrow	(Germany) Rinaldi Racing	Ret	19	24	10	10	4	15	14
16	(Switzerland) Jonathan Brossard	(France) ANS Motorsport	Ret	6	10	9	8	Ret	11	14
16	(France) Nicolas Schatz	(France) ANS Motorsport	Ret	6	10	9	8	Ret	11	14
17	(Germany) Matthias Lüthen	(France) MV2S Racing	7	7	Ret	16	9			13
18	(Switzerland) Pieder Decurtins	(Switzerland) Haegeli by T2 Racing	13	23	23	15		6	14	8
18	(Belgium) Brent Verheyen	(Switzerland) Haegeli by T2 Racing	13	23	23	15		6	14	8
19	(Australia) Scott Andrews	(United Kingdom) United Autosports	24	11	5	20			24	8
19	(United States) Gerald Kraut	(United Kingdom) United Autosports	24	11	5	20			24	8
20	(France) Emilien Carde	(France) MV2S Racing	7			16	9	19	17	8
21	(United States) Bryson Morris	(Poland) Inter Europol Competition	Ret	30	12	24	13	17	7	6
21	(United Kingdom) Chris Short	(Poland) Inter Europol Competition	Ret	30	12	24	13	17	7	6
22	(France) Mathis Poulet	(France) MV2S Racing		7	Ret					5
23	(Germany) Klaus Abbelen	(Germany) Frikadelli Racing Team	8	12	26	Ret	16			4
23	(Germany) Felipe Fernández Laser	(Germany) Frikadelli Racing Team	8	12	26	Ret	16			4
24	(Paraguay) Oscar Bittar	(Poland) Team Virage	12	Ret	21	Ret	18	Ret	8	4
24	(Italy) Alessandro Bracalente	(Poland) Team Virage	12	Ret	21	Ret	18	Ret	8	4
25	(United Kingdom) James Sweetnam	(France) Graff Racing	**10**	15	Ret	18	20	9	13	4
26	(France) Patrice Lafargue	(France) IDEC Sport	17	21	9	Ret	12		25†	3
26	(France) Dino Lunardi	(France) IDEC Sport	17	21	9	Ret	12		25†	3
27	(Switzerland) Samir Ben	(France) Graff Racing						9	13	2
28	(Spain) Santiago Concepción Serrano	(Poland) Inter Europol Competition	Ret	20	Ret	Ret	Ret	Ret	9	2
28	(United Kingdom) Ben Stone	(Poland) Inter Europol Competition	Ret	20	Ret	Ret	Ret	Ret	9	2
29	(Republic of Ireland) Lucca Allen	(France) Graff Racing	**10**	15	Ret					2
30	(United Kingdom) Josh Caygill	(United Kingdom) United Autosports					**11**			2
30	(United Kingdom) Josh Caygill	(Republic of Ireland) Murphy Prototypes						10		2
31	(United Kingdom) Will Bratt	(Republic of Ireland) Murphy Prototypes					Ret	10		1
32	(Australia) Garnet Patterson	(United Kingdom) United Autosports					**11**			1
33	(Germany) Torsten Kratz	(Germany) WTM by Rinaldi Racing		Ret	2					0
33	(Germany) Torsten Kratz	(Republic of Ireland) Murphy Prototypes					NC		12	0
33	(France) Sacha Lehmann	(France) M Racing		14	4	Ret	Ret	Ret		0
33	(Portugal) Miguel Cristóvão	(France) M Racing		14	4	Ret				0
33	(France) Antoine Doquin	(Switzerland) Racing Spirit of Léman		5	Ret		Ret			0
33	(France) Jacques Wolff	(Switzerland) Racing Spirit of Léman		5	Ret					0
33	(Australia) George Nakas	(France) Graff Racing	11	28	30	21	15	11	16	0
33	(Australia) Fraser Ross	(France) Graff Racing	11	28	30	21	15	11	16	0
33	(Germany) Christian Gisy	(Switzerland) Racing Spirit of Léman	19	Ret	16	14		12	19	0
33	(Germany) Ralf Kelleners	(Switzerland) Racing Spirit of Léman	19	Ret	16	14		12	19	0
33	(Canada) Daniel Ali	(Poland) Inter Europol Competition	22	DNS	25	12	Ret	16	18	0
33	(Australia) Andres Latorre Canon	(Poland) Inter Europol Competition	22	DNS	25	12	Ret	16	18	0
33	(Brazil) Enzo Elias	(Republic of Ireland) Murphy Prototypes							12	0
33	(United Kingdom) Andrew Ferguson	(United Kingdom) 24-7 Motorsport	18	27	22	NC	19	13	23	0
33	(United Kingdom) Louis Hamilton-Smith	(United Kingdom) 24-7 Motorsport	18	27	22	NC	19	13	23	0
33	(Canada) James Dayson	(United Kingdom) 360 Racing				13				0
33	(France) Philippe Cimadomo	(France) MV2S Racing						19	17	0
33	(France) Paul Trojani	(France) Graff Racing				18				0
33	(Spain) Xavier Lloveras	(France) Graff Racing					20			0
33	(United Kingdom) Adrian Watt	(Republic of Ireland) Murphy Prototypes	21	29	31					0
33	(Czech Republic) Dan Skočdopole	(Republic of Ireland) Murphy Prototypes	21	29						0
33	(United Kingdom) Will Powell	(Republic of Ireland) Murphy Prototypes				31				0
33	(France) Erwin Creed	(France) M Racing					Ret	Ret		0
33	(France) Jean-Ludovic Foubert	(Switzerland) Racing Spirit of Léman					Ret			0
Pos.	Driver	Team	BAR (Spain)	LMS (France)		LEC (France)	ARA (Spain)	SPA (Belgium)	POR (Portugal)	Points

Key
Colour	Result
Gold	Race winner
Silver	2nd place
Bronze	3rd place
Green	Points finish
Blue	Non-points finish
Blue	Non-classified finish (NC)
Purple	Did not finish (Ret)
Black	Disqualified (DSQ)
Black	Excluded (EX)
White	Did not start (DNS)
White	Race cancelled (C)
White	Withdrew (WD)
Blank	Did not participate

**Bold** – Pole
Italics – Fastest Lap

=== LMP3 Teams Championship ===
Pos.	Team	Chassis	BAR (Spain)	LMS (France)		LEC (France)	ARA (Spain)	SPA (Belgium)	POR (Portugal)	Points
1	(Poland) #16 Team Virage	Ligier JS P320	1	8	Ret	1	2	18	**21**	73
2	(Spain) #2 CD Sport	Ligier JS P320	3	Ret	**3**	19	6	2	2	69
3	(Iceland) #77 Team Thor	Ligier JS P320	4	2	15	3	3	14	6	59
4	(United Kingdom) #4 Nielsen Racing	Duqueine M30 - D08	Ret	1	7	11	1	Ret	Ret	45
5	(Switzerland) #87 Cool Racing	Ligier JS P320	6	10	32	**2**	4	Ret	10	42
6	(United Kingdom) #26 360 Racing	Ligier JS P320	5	9	6	6	17	15	6	39
7	(Switzerland) #97 Cool Racing	Ligier JS P320	20	3	1	8	7	7	20	38
8	(United Kingdom) #23 United Autosports	Ligier JS P320	16	13	19	5	Ret	1	22	35
9	(United Kingdom) #7 Nielsen Racing	Ligier JS P320	Ret	18	8	32	Ret	**Ret**	1	30
10	(United Kingdom) #25 360 Racing	Ligier JS P320	15	17	13	13	5	5	5	30
11	(Spain) #11 CD Sport	Ligier JS P320	14	25	28	7	14	Ret	3	21
12	(France) #68 M Racing	Ligier JS P320	2	16	20	Ret	Ret	Ret		18
13	(Luxembourg) #3 DKR Engineering	Duqueine M30 - D08	9	Ret	29	4	NC	8	26	18
14	(France) #28 MV2S Racing	Ligier JS P320	23	22	11	17	21	3	Ret	16
15	(Germany) #66 Rinaldi Racing	Ligier JS P320	Ret	19	24	10	10	4	15	14
16	(France) #6 ANS Motorsport	Ligier JS P320	Ret	6	10	9	8	Ret	11	14
17	(France) #29 MV2S Racing	Ligier JS P320	7	7	Ret	16	9	19	17	13
18	(United Kingdom) #22 United Autosports	Ligier JS P320	24	11	5	20	**11**	Ret	24	9
19	(Switzerland) #67 Haegeli by T2 Racing	Duqueine M30 - D08	13	23	23	15		6	14	8
20	(Poland) #15 Inter Europol Competition	Ligier JS P320	Ret	30	12	36	13	17	7	6
21	(Germany) #30 Frikadelli Racing Team	Ligier JS P320	8	12	26	Ret	16			4
22	(Poland) #59 Team Virage	Ligier JS P320	12	Ret	21	Ret	18	Ret	8	4
23	(France) #39 Graff Racing	Ligier JS P320	**10**	15	Ret	18	20	9	13	4
24	(France) #17 IDEC Sport	Ligier JS P320	17	21	9	Ret	12		25	3
25	(Poland) #13 Inter Europol Competition	Ligier JS P320	Ret	20	Ret	Ret	Ret	Ret	9	2
26	(Republic of Ireland) #48 Murphy Prototypes	Duqueine M30 - D08	21	29	31	31	NC	10	12	1
27	(France) #8 Graff Racing	Ligier JS P320	11	28	30	21	15	11	16	0
28	(Switzerland) #9 Racing Spirit of Léman	Ligier JS P320	19	Ret	16	14	Ret	12	19	0
29	(Poland) #14 Inter Europol Competition	Ligier JS P320	22	DNS	25	12	Ret	16	18	0
30	(United Kingdom) #27 24-7 Motorsport	Ligier JS P320	18	27	22	NC	19	13	23	0
Teams ineligible to score points
	(Germany) #33 WTM by Rinaldi Racing	Duqueine M30 - D08		Ret	2					
	(France) #69 M Racing	Ligier JS P320		14	4					
	(Poland) #58 Team Virage	Ligier JS P320		**4**	17					
	(Switzerland) #12 Racing Spirit of Léman	Ligier JS P320		5	Ret					
	(Luxembourg) #5 DKR Engineering	Duqueine M30 - D08		Ret	14					
	(United Kingdom) #21 United Autosports	Ligier JS P320		24	18					
	(France) #38 Graff Racing	Ligier JS P320		26	27					
	(United Kingdom) #20 United Autosports	Ligier JS P320		Ret	DNS					
Pos.	Team	Chassis	BAR (Spain)	LMS (France)		LEC (France)	ARA (Spain)	SPA (Belgium)	POR (Portugal)	Points

=== GT3 Drivers Championship ===
Pos.	Driver	Team	BAR (Spain)	LMS (France)		LEC (France)	ARA (Spain)	SPA (Belgium)	POR (Portugal)	Points
1	(France) Valentin Hasse-Clot	(Switzerland) Racing Spirit of Léman	**1**	3	13	2	3	5	2	97
1	(France) Arnold Robin	(Switzerland) Racing Spirit of Léman	**1**	3	13	2	3	5	2	97
2	(Japan) Kei Cozzolino	(Italy) AF Corse	3	4	16	4	1	6	5	77
2	(Japan) Hiroshi Koizumi	(Italy) AF Corse	3	4	16	4	1	6	5	77
3	(United Kingdom) Tim Creswick	(Denmark) HCR with CaffeineSix	4	2	4	9	**2**	9	6	73
3	(Denmark) Anders Fjordbach	(Denmark) HCR with CaffeineSix	4	2	4	9	**2**	9	6	73
4	(Finland) Patrick Kujala	(Germany) Leipert Motorsport	Ret	11	7	1	6	2	4	72
4	(Luxembourg) Gabriel Rindone	(Germany) Leipert Motorsport	Ret	11	7	1	6	2	4	72
5	(United Kingdom) Nick Jones	(United Kingdom) Team Parker Racing	2	5	11	8	9	3	3	63
5	(United Kingdom) Scott Malvern	(United Kingdom) Team Parker Racing	2	5	11	8	9	3	3	63
6	(Japan) Hiroshi Hamaguchi	(Italy) Iron Lynx	7	Ret	Ret	**3**		**Ret**	1	48
6	(Monaco) Vincent Abril	(Italy) Iron Lynx	8	Ret	Ret	**3**		**Ret**	1	48
7	(Denmark) Jan Magnussen	(Denmark) GMB Motorsport	5	6	6	7	Ret	4	9	44
7	(Denmark) Lars Engelbreckt Pedersen	(Denmark) GMB Motorsport	5	6	6	7	Ret	4	9	44
8	(United Kingdom) Sennan Fielding	(United Kingdom) Steller Motorsport	10	15	10	11	8	1	7	41
9	(Denmark) Thomas Andersen	(Denmark) GMB Motorsport	6	16	8	12	4	8	11	30
9	(Denmark) Simon Birch	(Denmark) GMB Motorsport	6	16	8	12	4	8	11	30
10	(United Kingdom) Mark Cole	(United Kingdom) Steller Motorsport					8	1		29
11	(France) Emmanuel Collard	(Italy) AF Corse	9	9	12	6	7	Ret	10	24
11	(France) Charles-Henri Samani	(Italy) AF Corse	9	9	12	6	7	Ret	10	24
12	(United Kingdom) Charles Bateman	(United Kingdom) Team Parker Racing	8	Ret	Ret	10	5	7	**12**	22
12	(United Kingdom) Alex Martin	(United Kingdom) Team Parker Racing	8	Ret	Ret	10	5	7	**12**	22
13	(New Zealand) Brendon Leitch	(Germany) Leipert Motorsport	Ret	12	5	5	Ret		8	21
13	(United States) Gerhard Watzinger	(Germany) Leipert Motorsport	Ret	12	5	5	Ret			21
14	(France) Sylvain Guintoli	(United Kingdom) Steller Motorsport							7	6
15	(United Kingdom) James Wood	(United Kingdom) Steller Motorsport	10	15	10	11				6
Pos.	Driver	Team	BAR (Spain)	LMS (France)		LEC (France)	ARA (Spain)	SPA (Belgium)	POR (Portugal)	Points

=== GT3 Teams Championship ===
Pos.	Team	Car	BAR (Spain)	LMS (France)		LEC (France)	ARA (Spain)	SPA (Belgium)	POR (Portugal)	Points
1	(Switzerland) #10 Racing Spirit of Léman	Aston Martin Vantage AMR GT3	**1**	3	13	2	3	5	2	97
2	(Italy) #51 AF Corse	Ferrari 296 GT3	3	4	16	4	1	6	5	77
3	(Denmark) #86 HCR with CaffeineSix	Porsche 911 GT3 R (991.2)	4	2	4	9	**2**	9	6	73
4	(Germany) #19 Leipert Motorsport	Lamborghini Huracán GT3 Evo 2	Ret	11	7	1	6	2	4	72
5	(United Kingdom) #18 Team Parker Racing	Porsche 911 GT3 R (992)	2	5	11	8	9	3	3	63
6	(Italy) #63 Iron Lynx	Lamborghini Huracán GT3 Evo 2	7	Ret	Ret	**3**		**Ret**	1	48
7	(Denmark) #88 GMB Motorsport	Honda NSX GT3 Evo22	5	6	6	7	Ret	4	9	44
8	(United Kingdom) #42 Steller Motorsport	Audi R8 LMS Evo II	10	15	10	11	8	1	7	41
9	(Denmark) #55 GMB Motorsport	Honda NSX GT3 Evo22	6	16	8	12	4	8	11	30
10	(Italy) #83 AF Corse	Ferrari 296 GT3	9	9	12	6	7	Ret	10	24
11	(United Kingdom) #64 Team Parker Racing	Porsche 911 GT3 R (991.2)	8	Ret	DNS	10	5	7	**12**	22
12	(Germany) #70 Leipert Motorsport	Lamborghini Huracán GT3 Evo 2	Ret	12	5	5	Ret			21
Teams ineligible to score points
	(Belgium) #31 Team WRT	BMW M4 GT3		**1**	2					
	(Belgium) #46 Team WRT	BMW M4 GT3		13	**1**					
	(United States) #57 Winward Racing	Mercedes-AMG GT3 Evo		8	3					
	(Denmark) #95 GMB Motorsport	BMW M4 GT3		7	15					
	(Germany) #24 Leipert Motorsport	Lamborghini Huracán GT3 Evo							8	
	(Italy) #53 AF Corse	Ferrari 488 GT3 Evo 2020		10	9					
	(Italy) #74 Kessel Racing	Ferrari 488 GT3 Evo 2020		14	14					
	(France) #76 IMSA LS Group Performance	Porsche 911 GT3 R (992)		17	17					
	(Italy) #52 AF Corse	Ferrari 488 GT3 Evo 2020		Ret	18					
Pos.	Team	Car	BAR (Spain)	LMS (France)		LEC (France)	ARA (Spain)	SPA (Belgium)	POR (Portugal)	Points
