= Manuel Espírito Santo =

Portuguese sportscar racing driver (born 2003)

- Espírito Santo at Silverstone Circuit in 2026.
- Nationality: (Portugal) Portuguese
- Born: 13 August 2003 (age 23) Portugal

European Le Mans Series career
- Debut season: 2023
- Current team: CLX Motorsport
- Categorisation: FIA Silver
- Car number: 17
- Former teams: Team Virage, Cool Racing
- Starts: 15 (15 entries)
- Wins: 1
- Podiums: 4
- Poles: 5
- Fastest laps: 1
- Best finish: 5th (LMP3) in 2024

Previous series
- 2023 2019, 21–22: Ultimate Cup Series; F4 Spanish Championship
Medal record
Formula 4
Representing Portugal
FIA Motorsport Games
Silver medal – second place	2022 Le Castellet	F4 Cup

Manuel Espírito Santo (born 13 August 2003) is a Portuguese racing driver who currently drives for Rossa Racing by Virage in the LMP2 Pro-Am category of the European Le Mans Series.

== Early career ==
=== Junior formulae ===
After starting his career at the comparatively late age of 14, Espírito Santo made his racing debut in single-seater machinery at the end of 2019, driving for Drivex School at Barcelona in the final round of the F4 Spanish Championship. He finished eighth in his maiden race.

After a year of senior-level karting, Espírito Santo returned to Spanish F4 in 2021. Despite starting out with multiple points-scoring weekends for MP Motorsport, Espírito Santo managed just two further points finishes in the season's second half, ending up 17th in the standings. He switched to Teo Martín Motorsport for the 2022 season, where he would fail to score points in the opening two events before moving to Campos Racing. The results swiftly improved, as Espírito Santo scored a pair of podiums at Valencia — his first weekend for the team. Further points followed at Spa, Aragón, and Barcelona, results which helped Espírito Santo to 12th place in the championship. At the end of the year, he represented Team Portugal in the Formula 4 Cup of the FIA Motorsport Games, where he qualified in fifth, placed second during the qualifying race, and ended up second overall in the main race.

== Sportscar career ==
=== 2023 ===
2023 saw Espírito Santo enter prototype racing, as he would drive in the European Le Mans Series alongside gentleman drivers Michael Jensen and Nick Adcock, driving an LMP3 car for Team Virage. He managed to impress in his debut season, scoring pole positions at Spa and his home track in the Algarve. However, retirements at Aragón and the Algarve blighted the team's season, as Espírito Santo and his teammates ended up tenth in the teams' standings.

Additionally, Espírito Santo joined the team in the Ultimate Cup Series that year in the Proto P3 class. The team dominated, as Espírito Santo helped them towards three victories whilst scoring four fastest laps; he ended up second in the drivers' championship after missing one race. He also raced in the Road to Le Mans, a preliminary event ahead of the 24 Hours of Le Mans. Espírito Santo took pole and crossed the finish line first during the opening race, though he and teammate Martin Rich were demoted to fourth after the Portuguese received a five-second penalty for overtaking under safety car conditions.

=== 2024 ===
At the start of 2024, Cool Racing brought in Espírito Santo for the final two races of the Asian Le Mans Series at Abu Dhabi. There, he helped the team towards the LMP3 class title by scoring two pole positions and two second-place finishes. This would prove to be preparation for Espírito Santo's main campaign, which he would contest with Cool in the ELMS alongside fellow silver-ranked driver Cédric Oltramare and Portuguese bronze Miguel Cristóvão. The opening round at Barcelona brought another pole position to the youngster, who later crossed the line in second.

After finishing fifth and eighth at Le Castellet and Imola, Espírito Santo was back on the podium at Spa-Francorchamps, where he came third place. At the penultimate round of the season at Mugello, he got his first pole position of the season but retired 68 laps in the race.

In the final round of the season and at his home race of Algarve, Espírito Santo got another pole position, which his team converted to their first win alongside a fastest lap. This was also his first ever win in endurance racing, barring his wins in the Ultimate Cup Series. Espírito Santo finished fifth in the championship with one win, three pole positions, one fastest lap, three podiums and 75 points.

Espírito Santo made a cameo in the second round of the 2024 Ultimate Cup Series in the Proto P3 class, at Algarve International Circuit, his hometrack. He competed with Bretton Racing, partnering up with Bernardo Pinheiro, they achieved pole position but came 12th in the race.

=== 2025 ===
Cool Racing would be rebranded to CLX Motorsport from 2025, as Espírito Santo would have a second season with the team in the 2025 European Le Mans Series, and he would also move up to the LMP2 class.

After retiring from the first race at the 4 Hours of Barcelona, Espírito Santo came third in the second round at the 4 Hours of Le Castellet, achieving his first LMP2 podium. Espírito Santo missed the 2025 4 Hours of Spa-Francorchamps after an testing accident which caused injury. At Silverstone, he had a difficult race, coming in twelfth. He came sixth in the final round in his home track at Portimão and ended his campaign in tenth.

Espirito Santo competed in the third round of the 2025 IMSA SportsCar Championship, coming seventh in the main race and ending the championship in 49th.

=== 2026 ===
He partnered Pietro Fittipaldi and Chris Cummings in the LMP2 class of the IMSA SportsCar Championship for Pratt Miller Motorsports, where he contested all rounds but three. His best result came in the final round at Petit Le Mans, where the trio finished in fifth.

Espírito Santo also continued with his ELMS duties that year, switching to Rossa Racing by Virage and partnering John Falb and Rik Koen, then he switched to the LMP2 Pro-Am class. The trios best result of the year was a podium at Silverstone.

== Personal life ==
Espírito Santo is a part of Skywalker Management.

== Karting record ==
=== Karting career summary ===
Season	Series	Team	Position
2020	CIK-FIA European Championship - OK	Cabo Junior Team	?
2020	CIK-FIA World Championship - OK	Cabo Junior Team	?

== Racing record ==
=== Racing career summary ===
Season	Series	Team	Races	Wins	Poles	F/Laps	Podiums	Points	Position
2019	F4 Spanish Championship	Drivex School	3	0	0	0	0	0	NC†
2021	F4 Spanish Championship	MP Motorsport	21	0	0	0	0	30	17th
2022	F4 Spanish Championship	Teo Martín Motorsport	6	0	0	0	0	59	12th
2022	F4 Spanish Championship	Campos Racing	15	0	0	0	2	59	12th
2022	FIA Motorsport Games Formula 4 Cup	Team Portugal	1	0	0	0	1	N/A	**2nd**
2023	European Le Mans Series - LMP3	Team Virage	6	0	2	0	0	30	11th
2023	Le Mans Cup - LMP3	Team Virage	2	0	1	0	0	0	NC†
2023	Ultimate Cup Series - Proto P3	Team Virage	5	3	5	4	5	133	**2nd**
2023-24	Asian Le Mans Series - LMP3	Cool Racing	2	0	2	2	2	38	7th
2024	European Le Mans Series - LMP3	Cool Racing	6	1	3	1	3	75	5th
2024	Ultimate Cup Series - Proto P3	Bretton Racing	1	0	1	1	0	10	36th
2025	European Le Mans Series - LMP2	CLX Motorsport	5	0	0	0	1	3	10th
2025	IMSA SportsCar Championship - LMP2	Pratt Miller Motorsports	1	0	0	0	0	262	49th
2026	IMSA SportsCar Championship - LMP2	Pratt Miller Motorsports	5	0	0	0	0	1225	23rd
2026	European Le Mans Series - LMP2 Pro-Am	Rossa Racing by Virage	6	0	0	0	1	59	6th

^{†} As Espírito Santo was a guest driver, he was ineligible to score championship points.

^{*} Season still in progress.

=== Complete F4 Spanish Championship results ===
(key) (Races in bold indicate pole position) (Races in italics indicate fastest lap)

Year	Team	1	2	3	4	5	6	7	8	9	10	11	12	13	14	15	16	17	18	19	20	21	DC	Points
2019	Drivex School	NAV; 1	NAV; 2	NAV; 3	LEC; 1	LEC; 2	LEC; 3	ARA; 1	ARA; 2	ARA; 3	CRT; 1	CRT; 2	CRT; 3	JER; 1	JER; 2	JER; 3	ALG; 1	ALG; 2	ALG; 3	CAT; 1; 8	CAT; 2; 18	CAT; 3; 15	NC†	0
2021	MP Motorsport	SPA; 1; 13	SPA; 2; 18	SPA; 3; 10	NAV; 1; 7	NAV; 2; 5	NAV; 3; 8	ALG; 1; 8	ALG; 2; 22	ALG; 3; 22†	ARA; 1; 12	ARA; 2; 11	ARA; 3; 23†	CRT; 1 Ret	CRT; 2 Ret	CRT; 3; 10	JER; 1; 12	JER; 2 Ret	JER; 3; 6	CAT; 1; 12	CAT; 2 Ret	CAT; 3; 19	17th	30
2022	Teo Martín Motorsport	ALG; 1; 17	ALG; 2; 14	ALG; 3 Ret	JER; 1; 13	JER; 2; 13	JER; 3 Ret																12th	59
2022	Campos Racing							CRT; 1; 2	CRT; 2; 3	CRT; 3; 5	SPA; 1; 7	SPA; 2; 7	SPA; 3; 9	ARA; 1 Ret	ARA; 2; 7	ARA; 3; 22†	NAV; 1; 13	NAV; 2; 13	NAV; 3; 16	CAT; 1; 7	CAT; 2; 16	CAT; 3; 10	12th	59

^{†} As Espírito Santo was a guest driver, he was ineligible to score points.

=== Complete FIA Motorsport Games results ===
Year	Team	Cup	Qualifying	Quali Race	Main Race
2022	Team Portugal	**Formula 4**	5th	**2nd**	**2nd**

=== Complete European Le Mans Series results ===
(key) (Races in bold indicate pole position; results in italics indicate fastest lap)

Year	Entrant	Class	Chassis	Engine	1	2	3	4	5	6	Rank	Points
2023	Team Virage	LMP3	Ligier JS P320	Nissan VK56DE 5.6 L V8	CAT; 8	LEC; 8	ARA; Ret	**SPA**; 5	**PRT**; Ret	ALG; 5	11th	30
2024	Cool Racing	LMP3	Ligier JS P320	Nissan VK56DE 5.6L V8	**CAT**; 2	LEC; 5	IMO; 8	SPA; 3	**MUG**; Ret	**ALG**; 1	5th	75
2025	CLX Motorsport	LMP2	Oreca 07	Gibson GK428 4.2 L V8	CAT; Ret	LEC; 3	IMO; 5	SPA; WD	SIL; 12	ALG; 6	10th	33
2026	Rossa Racing by Virage	LMP2 Pro-Am	Oreca 07	Gibson GK428 4.2 L V8	CAT; 5	LEC; 7	IMO; 4	SPA; 6	SIL; 3	ALG; 6	6th	59

=== Complete Ultimate Cup Series results ===
(key) (Races in bold indicate pole position; results in italics indicate fastest lap)

Year	Entrant	Class	Chassis	1	2	3	4	5	6	Rank	Points
2023	Team Virage	LMP3	Ligier JS P320	**LEC1**; 1	NAV	**HOC**; 2	**EST**; 1	**MAG**; 1	**LEC2**; 6	2nd	133
2024	Bretton Racing	LMP3	Ligier JS P320	LEC1	**ALG**; 12	HOC	MUG	MAG	LEC2	36th	10

^{*} Season still in progress.

=== Complete Asian Le Mans Series results ===
(key) (Races in bold indicate pole position) (Races in italics indicate fastest lap)

Year	Team	Class	Car	Engine	1	2	3	4	5	Pos.	Points
2023–24	Cool Racing	LMP3	Ligier JS P320	Nissan VK56DE 5.6 L V8	SEP; 1	SEP; 2	DUB	**ABU**; **1**; 2	**ABU**; **2**; 2	7th	38

=== Complete IMSA SportsCar Championship results ===
(key) (Races in bold indicate pole position; races in italics indicate fastest lap)

Year	Team	Class	Make	Engine	1	2	3	4	5	6	7	Rank	Points
2025	Pratt Miller Motorsports	LMP2	Oreca 07	Gibson GK428 4.2 L V8	DAY	SEB	WGL; 7	MOS	ELK	IMS	PET	49th	262
2026	Pratt Miller Motorsports	LMP2	Oreca 07	Gibson GK428 4.2 L V8	DAY; 11	SEB; 9	WGL; 8	MOS	ELK; 11	IMS	PET; 5	23rd	1225
