= Auðunn Guðmundsson =

Icelandic racing driver

- Nationality: Icelandic
- Born: 17 August 1971 (age 55) Garðabær, Iceland

Le Mans Cup - LMP3 career
- Debut season: 2021
- Current team: Team Thor
- Categorisation: FIA Bronze
- Car number: 77
- Starts: 15 (15 entries)
- Wins: 0
- Podiums: 0
- Poles: 0
- Fastest laps: 0
- Best finish: 21st in 2022

Previous series
- 2019–2020: Radical Challenge Championship UK

Auðunn Svafar Guðmundsson (born 17 August 1971 in Garðabær) is an Icelandic amateur racing driver and businessman. He currently competes in the International GT Open.

== Results ==
=== Career summary ===
Season	Series	Team	Races	Wins	Poles	F/Laps	Podiums	Points	Position
2019	Radical Challenge Championship UK	Radical Works Team	9	0	0	0	0	213	17th
2020	Radical Challenge Championship UK	Radical Works Team	1	0	0	0	0	0	NC
2021	Le Mans Cup - LMP3	Team Thor	7	0	0	0	0	3.5	30th
2022	Le Mans Cup - LMP3	Team Thor	7	0	0	0	0	12	21st
2022	Ultimate Cup Series - Proto P3	Team Thor	1	0	0	1	1	18	12th
2023	Le Mans Cup - LMP3	Team Thor	7	0	0	0	3	59	**3rd**
2023-24	Asian Le Mans Series - LMP3	High Class Racing	5	0	2	0	2	56	5th
2024	Le Mans Cup - LMP3	Team Thor	7	1	0	0	1	60	4th
2025	International GT Open	Team Thor	6	0	0	0	0	0	65th
2025	Le Mans Cup - LMP3 Pro-Am	High Class Racing	1	0	0	0	0	0	NC
2026	GT2 European Series - Pro-Am	High Class Racing							

*Season in progress.

=== Complete Le Mans Cup results ===
(key) (Races in bold indicate pole position; results in italics indicate fastest lap)

Year	Entrant	Class	Chassis	1	2	3	4	5	6	7	Rank	Points
2021	Team Thor	LMP3	Ligier JS P320	CAT; 14	LEC; 11	MNZ; 14	LMS; 1; 11	LMS; 2; 10	SPA; 17	ALG; 14	30th	3.5
2022	Team Thor	LMP3	Ligier JS P320	LEC; 12	IMO; 15	LMS; 1; 18	LMS; 2; 14	MNZ; 9	SPA; 11	ALG; 5	21st	12
2023	Team Thor	LMP3	Ligier JS P320	CAT; 4	LMS; 1; 2	LMS; 2; 15	LEC; 3	ARA; 3	SPA; 14	ALG; 6	3rd	59
2024	Team Thor	LMP3	Ligier JS P320	CAT; 6	LEC; 5	LMS; 1; 5	LMS; 2; 7	SPA; Ret	MUG; 5	ALG; 1	4th	60
2025	High Class Racing	LMP3 Pro-Am	Ligier JS P325	CAT	LEC	LMS; 1	LMS; 2	SPA	SIL	ALG; Ret	NC	0

=== Complete Asian Le Mans Series results ===
(key) (Races in bold indicate pole position) (Races in italics indicate fastest lap)

Year	Team	Class	Car	Engine	1	2	3	4	5	Pos.	Points
2023–24	High Class Racing	LMP3	Ligier JS P320	Nissan VK56DE 5.6 L V8	**SEP**; **1**; 4	**SEP**; **2** Ret	DUB; 3	ABU; 1; 3	ABU; 2; 4	5th	56
