= Julien Gerbi =

French-Algerian racing car driver (born 1985)

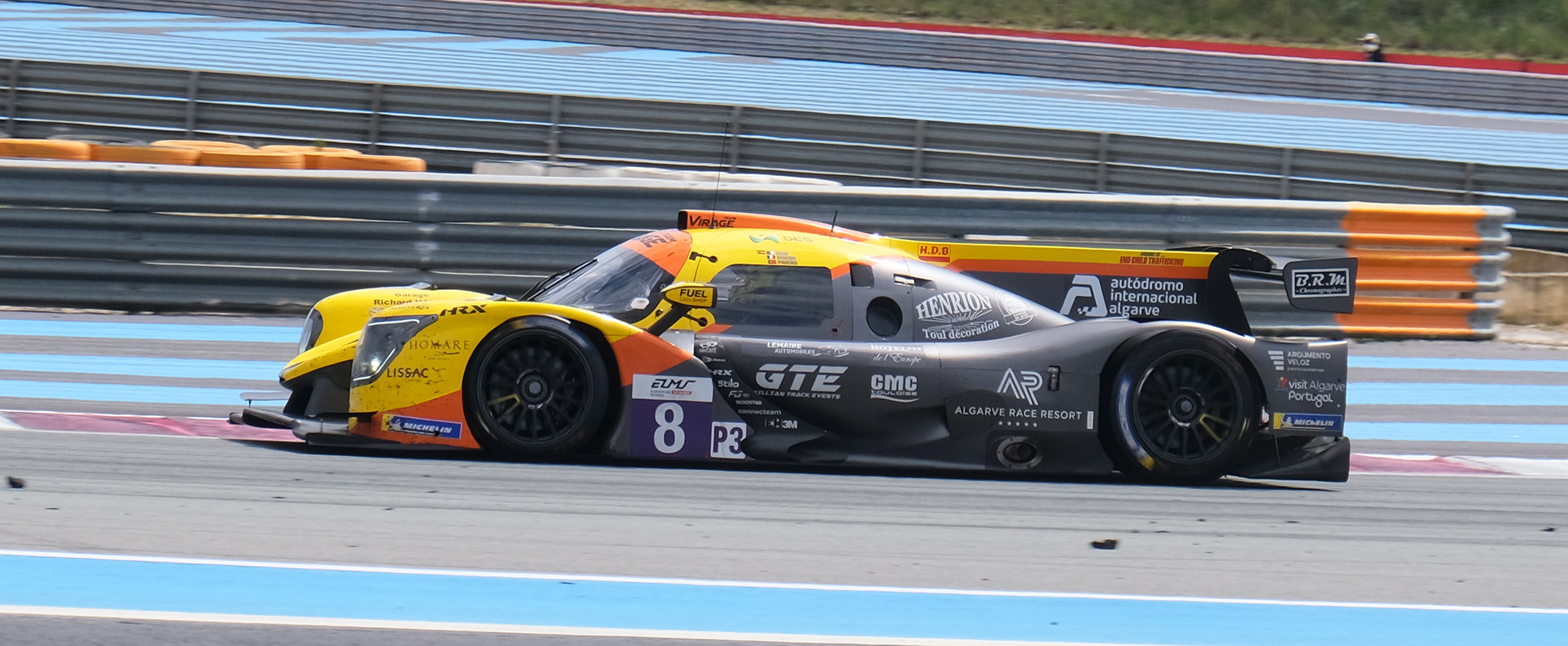
- Gerbi in 2024
- Nationality: (France) French (Algeria) Algerian (Spain) Spanish
- Born: Julien Gerbi Luzet; 3 October 1985 (age 41) Nice, France
- Debut season: 2004
- Categorisation: FIA Silver (until 2018); FIA Bronze (2019–)
- Car number: 8
- Starts: 100-150
- Wins: 4 (in category: 14)
- Poles: 4
- Fastest laps: 4
- Best finish: 1st in 2006

Previous series
- 2004 2005 2006 2007-2008 2009: European Sport Prototypes; Spanish Formula BMW; Turkish Formula 3 US Barber Mazda Series; Formula Palmer Audi

Championship titles
- 2004 2006: European Sport Prototypes Rookie Champion; Turkish Formula 3 Rookie Champion

Julien Gerbi Luzet (born 3 October 1985) is a French-Algerian-Spanish race car driver.

== Career ==
=== Debut ===
Gerbi started driving in karting in 1992, but didn't choose to race, competing only once in Monaco where he won his first competition. He trained many years, before debuting as a test driver in Formula Nissan Junior in 2003 with the GTEC Team.

=== Sport Prototypes ===
In 2004, promoted as the new "Draco Target Driver", the Berber driver participated to the Formula X Endurance Series, finishing fourth in the European category. He finished third for his first race in Monza, and poleman for the first ever race held in the brand new Dubai Autodrome. He was crowned 'Best Rookie' at the end of the year. He also tested in British Formula Three for the Promatecme Team.

=== Formula 3 ===
Gerbi only appeared in one race of the Spanish Formula BMW championship in 2005, before jumping into another Formula 3 seat in 2006. Racing for Team Active in the Turkish Formula Three Championship, Gerbi scored three wins and five podiums in eight races, establishing as well the new Izmir track record in May. Competing only half of the championship, his classification was a final fifth position and another rookie title.

=== US Barber Mazda Series ===
In 2007 and 2008, Gerbi raced in the United States in the Skip Barber Mazda Series. After a 2007 learning season where he finished tenth in the overall championship against 40 other drivers, Gerbi finished fourth in the 2008 edition, with ten podiums out of 14 races and a win in Virginia. He set the new track record in Lime Rock Park, and has also been included into the 2007 World 100 Future Racing Stars, among drivers such as Lewis Hamilton, Nelson Piquet Jr. or Sebastian Vettel.

=== Formula Palmer Audi ===
Gerbi eventually came back to Europe in 2009 following some British Formula 3 testing. He raced in Formula Palmer Audi, during a year marked by many mechanical issues, but eventually took a 1st row at Snetterton's last race. After having shown himself as the most improved driver of the season, he tested in Formula 3000 and Formula 2 during the winter.

== Results ==
=== Career summary ===
Season	Series	Team	Races	Wins	Poles	F/Laps	Podiums	Points	Position
2004	Formula X European Endurance Series	Draco Junior Team	8	0	1	0	1	36	5th
2005	Master Junior Formula	Escuela de Pilotos Emilio de Villota	1	0	0	0	0	10	20th
2006	Turkish Formula 3 Championship	Active Motorsport	8	3	2	2	5	47	5th
2007	Skip Barber National Series	Skip Barber Racing School	14	0	0	0	0	250	10th
2008	Skip Barber Eastern Regional Series	Skip Barber Racing School	14	1	1	2	10	521	4th
2009	Formula Palmer Audi	MotorSport Vision	20	0	0	0	0	152	12th
2019	Ultimate Cup Series - Challenge GT	Team Virage	1	1	0	1	1	25	8th
2020	Ultimate Cup Series - LMP3	Team Virage	1	0	0	0	1	30	11th
2020	European Le Mans Series - LMP3	Realteam Racing	1	0	0	0	1	18	18th
2021	European Le Mans Series - LMP3	Team Virage	1	0	0	0	0	1	37th
2021	Le Mans Cup - LMP3	Team Virage	2	0	0	0	0	0.5	39th
2023	Le Mans Cup - LMP3	Team Virage	7	2	1	0	3	73	**1st**
2023	Ultimate Cup Series - Proto P3	Team Virage	1	0	0	0	0	0.5	38th
2023–24	Asian Le Mans Series - LMP3	Bretton Racing	5	1	0	0	3	82	**3rd**
2024	European Le Mans Series - LMP3	Team Virage	6	2	0	0	3	90	**3rd**
2025	European Le Mans Series - LMP3	Team Virage	3	1	0	0	2	55	6th
2025–26	Asian Le Mans Series - LMP3	Team Virage	6	0	0	0	0	10	18th

*Season in progress

=== Complete Le Mans Cup results ===
(key) (Races in bold indicate pole position; results in italics indicate fastest lap)

Year	Entrant	Class	Chassis	1	2	3	4	5	6	7	Rank	Points
2021	Team Virage	LMP3	Ligier JS P320	CAT; 15	LEC	MNZ	LMS; 1	LMS; 2	SPA; Ret	ALG	39th	0.5
2023	Team Virage	LMP3	Ligier JS P320	CAT; 1	LMS; 1; 8	LMS; 2 Ret	LEC; 1	ARA; 2	SPA; 18	**ALG**; 21	1st	73

=== Complete Asian Le Mans Series results ===
(key) (Races in bold indicate pole position) (Races in italics indicate fastest lap)

Year	Team	Class	Car	Engine	1	2	3	4	5	Pos.	Points
2023–24	Bretton Racing	LMP3	Ligier JS P320	Nissan VK56DE 5.6 L V8	SEP; 1; 3	SEP; 2; 2	DUB; 4	ABU; 1; 4	ABU; 2; 1	3rd	82

=== Complete European Le Mans Series results ===
(key) (Races in bold indicate pole position; results in italics indicate fastest lap)

Year	Entrant	Class	Chassis	Engine	1	2	3	4	5	6	Rank	Points
2024	Team Virage	LMP3	Ligier JS P320	Nissan VK56DE 5.6L V8	CAT; 1	LEC; 7	IMO; 2	SPA; 6	MUG; 1	ALG; 6	3rd	90
2025	Team Virage	LMP3	Ligier JS P325	Toyota V35A 3.5 L V6	CAT	LEC	IMO	SPA; 1	SIL; 4	ALG; 2	6th	55

^{*} Season still in progress.
