= 2025 International GT Open =

The 2025 International GT Open was the twentieth season of the International GT Open, the grand tourer-style sports car racing series founded in 2006 by the Spanish GT Sport Organización. It began on 26 April at the Algarve International Circuit and finished at the Autodromo Nazionale di Monza on 19 October after eight rounds.

== Calendar ==
The calendar was announced on 11 July 2024.

Round		Circuit	Date	Support bill	Map of circuit locations
1	R1	(Portugal) Algarve International Circuit, Portimão	26–27 April	Euroformula Open Championship; TCR Europe Touring Car Series; GT Cup Open Europe	2025 International GT Open is located in Europe
1	R2	(Portugal) Algarve International Circuit, Portimão	26–27 April	Euroformula Open Championship; TCR Europe Touring Car Series; GT Cup Open Europe	2025 International GT Open is located in Europe
2		(Belgium) Circuit de Spa-Francorchamps, Stavelot	17–18 May	Formula Regional European Championship; Euroformula Open Championship; TCR Europe Touring Car Series; GT Cup Open Europe	2025 International GT Open is located in Europe
3	R1	(Germany) Hockenheimring, Hockenheim	7–8 June	Euroformula Open Championship; TCR Europe Touring Car Series; GT Cup Open Europe	2025 International GT Open is located in Europe
3	R2	(Germany) Hockenheimring, Hockenheim	7–8 June	Euroformula Open Championship; TCR Europe Touring Car Series; GT Cup Open Europe	2025 International GT Open is located in Europe
4	R1	(Hungary) Hungaroring, Mogyoród	5–6 July	Formula Regional European Championship; Euroformula Open Championship; GB3 Championship; Porsche Carrera Cup Benelux	2025 International GT Open is located in Europe
4	R2	(Hungary) Hungaroring, Mogyoród	5–6 July	Formula Regional European Championship; Euroformula Open Championship; GB3 Championship; Porsche Carrera Cup Benelux	2025 International GT Open is located in Europe
5	R1	(France) Circuit Paul Ricard, Le Castellet	19–20 July	Formula Regional European Championship; Euroformula Open Championship; GT Cup Open Europe; E4 Championship	2025 International GT Open is located in Europe
5	R2	(France) Circuit Paul Ricard, Le Castellet	19–20 July	Formula Regional European Championship; Euroformula Open Championship; GT Cup Open Europe; E4 Championship	2025 International GT Open is located in Europe
6	R1	(Austria) Red Bull Ring, Spielberg	6–7 September	Formula Regional European Championship; Euroformula Open Championship; TCR Europe Touring Car Series	2025 International GT Open is located in Europe
6	R2	(Austria) Red Bull Ring, Spielberg	6–7 September	Formula Regional European Championship; Euroformula Open Championship; TCR Europe Touring Car Series	2025 International GT Open is located in Europe
7	R1	(Spain) Circuit de Barcelona-Catalunya, Montmeló	20–21 September	Formula Regional European Championship; Euroformula Open Championship; GT Cup Open Europe; Italian F4 Championship	2025 International GT Open is located in Europe
7	R2	(Spain) Circuit de Barcelona-Catalunya, Montmeló	20–21 September	Formula Regional European Championship; Euroformula Open Championship; GT Cup Open Europe; Italian F4 Championship	2025 International GT Open is located in Europe
8		(Italy) Autodromo Nazionale di Monza, Monza	18–19 October	Euroformula Open Championship; Renault Clio Cup Series; GT Cup Open Europe; GB3 Championship	2025 International GT Open is located in Europe

== Entry list ==
Team	Car	Engine	No.	Drivers	Class	Rounds
(Austria) Eastalent Racing Team	Audi R8 LMS Evo II	Audi DAR 5.2 L V10	1	(Germany) Christopher Haase	P	All
(Austria) Eastalent Racing Team	Audi R8 LMS Evo II	Audi DAR 5.2 L V10	1	(Austria) Simon Reicher	P	All
(United Kingdom) Optimum Motorsport	McLaren 720S GT3 Evo	McLaren M840T 4.0 L Turbo V8	4	(United Kingdom) Zac Meakin	P	All
(United Kingdom) Optimum Motorsport	McLaren 720S GT3 Evo	McLaren M840T 4.0 L Turbo V8	4	(United Kingdom) Michael Porter	P	All
(Poland) Olimp Racing	Ferrari 296 GT3	Ferrari F163 3.0 L Turbo V6	5	(Poland) Stanisław Jedliński	Am	All
(Poland) Olimp Racing	Ferrari 296 GT3	Ferrari F163 3.0 L Turbo V6	5	(Poland) Krystian Korzeniowski	Am	All
(Poland) Olimp Racing	Ferrari 296 GT3 1, 6–7; Audi R8 LMS Evo II 2–5, 8	Ferrari F163 3.0 L Turbo V6; Audi DAR 5.2 L V10	777	(Poland) Karol Basz	PA	All
(Poland) Olimp Racing	Ferrari 296 GT3 1, 6–7; Audi R8 LMS Evo II 2–5, 8	Ferrari F163 3.0 L Turbo V6; Audi DAR 5.2 L V10	777	(Poland) Marcin Jedliński	PA	All
(Germany) GetSpeed Performance	Mercedes-AMG GT3 Evo	Mercedes-AMG M159 6.2 L V8	6	(Luxembourg) Steve Jans	PA	All
(Germany) GetSpeed Performance	Mercedes-AMG GT3 Evo	Mercedes-AMG M159 6.2 L V8	6	(United Kingdom) Aaron Walker	PA	All
(Germany) GetSpeed Performance	Mercedes-AMG GT3 Evo	Mercedes-AMG M159 6.2 L V8	9	(United States) Anthony Bartone	P	All
(Germany) GetSpeed Performance	Mercedes-AMG GT3 Evo	Mercedes-AMG M159 6.2 L V8	9	(Germany) Fabian Schiller	P	1–3, 5–7
(Germany) GetSpeed Performance	Mercedes-AMG GT3 Evo	Mercedes-AMG M159 6.2 L V8	9	(Germany) Luca Stolz	P	4
(Germany) GetSpeed Performance	Mercedes-AMG GT3 Evo	Mercedes-AMG M159 6.2 L V8	9	(Netherlands) Renger van der Zande	P	8
(Germany) GetSpeed Performance	Mercedes-AMG GT3 Evo	Mercedes-AMG M159 6.2 L V8	82	(Estonia) Ralf Aron	P	All
(Germany) GetSpeed Performance	Mercedes-AMG GT3 Evo	Mercedes-AMG M159 6.2 L V8	82	(Mexico) Marcelo Ramírez	P	All
(Germany) Vimana by GetSpeed	Mercedes-AMG GT3 Evo	Mercedes-AMG M159 6.2 L V8	108	(Zimbabwe) Ameerh Naran	Am; 1, 5–7; PA; 2, 8	1–2, 5–8 (Note: Tom Jackson withdrew from round 1, and Ameerh Naran competed solo for the event in Am Class)
(Germany) Vimana by GetSpeed	Mercedes-AMG GT3 Evo	Mercedes-AMG M159 6.2 L V8	108	(United Kingdom) Tom Jackson	Am; 1, 5–7; PA; 2, 8	1–2, 8
(United Kingdom) Garage 59	McLaren 720S GT3 Evo	McLaren M840T 4.0 L Turbo V8	8	(United Kingdom) Tom Fleming	P	3
(United Kingdom) Garage 59	McLaren 720S GT3 Evo	McLaren M840T 4.0 L Turbo V8	8	(Germany) Marvin Kirchhöfer	P	3
(United Kingdom) Garage 59	McLaren 720S GT3 Evo	McLaren M840T 4.0 L Turbo V8	8	(Germany) Benjamin Goethe	PA	8
(United Kingdom) Garage 59	McLaren 720S GT3 Evo	McLaren M840T 4.0 L Turbo V8	8	(Sweden) Alexander West	PA	8
(United Kingdom) Garage 59	McLaren 720S GT3 Evo	McLaren M840T 4.0 L Turbo V8	188	(United Kingdom) Mark Sansom	Am	All
(United Kingdom) Garage 59	McLaren 720S GT3 Evo	McLaren M840T 4.0 L Turbo V8	188	(Sweden) Alexander West	Am	3–5
(United Kingdom) Garage 59	McLaren 720S GT3 Evo	McLaren M840T 4.0 L Turbo V8	188	(Portugal) Miguel Ramos	Am	1–2
(United Kingdom) Garage 59	McLaren 720S GT3 Evo	McLaren M840T 4.0 L Turbo V8	188	(Italy) Marco Pulcini	Am	6, 8
(United Kingdom) Garage 59	McLaren 720S GT3 Evo	McLaren M840T 4.0 L Turbo V8	188	(United Kingdom) Charlie Hollings	Am	7
(Australia) Iron Lynx - Grove Racing	Mercedes-AMG GT3 Evo	Mercedes-AMG M159 6.2 L V8	10	(Australia) Brenton Grove	PA	1
(Australia) Iron Lynx - Grove Racing	Mercedes-AMG GT3 Evo	Mercedes-AMG M159 6.2 L V8	10	(Australia) Stephen Grove	PA	1
(Germany) Team Motopark	Mercedes-AMG GT3 Evo	Mercedes-AMG M159 6.2 L V8	11	(Hungary) Levente Révész	P	All
(Germany) Team Motopark	Mercedes-AMG GT3 Evo	Mercedes-AMG M159 6.2 L V8	11	(Germany) Maximilian Götz	P	2–3, 5–8
(Germany) Team Motopark	Mercedes-AMG GT3 Evo	Mercedes-AMG M159 6.2 L V8	11	(Italy) Matteo Cairoli	P	1
(Germany) Team Motopark	Mercedes-AMG GT3 Evo	Mercedes-AMG M159 6.2 L V8	11	(Switzerland) Philip Ellis	P	4
(Germany) Team Motopark	Mercedes-AMG GT3 Evo	Mercedes-AMG M159 6.2 L V8	13	(Germany) Niklas Krütten	P	1–4
(Germany) Team Motopark	Mercedes-AMG GT3 Evo	Mercedes-AMG M159 6.2 L V8	13	(Romania) Robert Vișoiu	P	1–4
(Germany) Team Motopark	Mercedes-AMG GT3 Evo	Mercedes-AMG M159 6.2 L V8	13	(Netherlands) Yelmer Buurman	PA	6
(Germany) Team Motopark	Mercedes-AMG GT3 Evo	Mercedes-AMG M159 6.2 L V8	13	(Netherlands) Remon Vos	PA	6
(Germany) Team Motopark	Mercedes-AMG GT3 Evo	Mercedes-AMG M159 6.2 L V8	65	(Austria) Lukas Dunner	PA	1–6, 8
(Germany) Team Motopark	Mercedes-AMG GT3 Evo	Mercedes-AMG M159 6.2 L V8	65	(Germany) Heiko Neumann	PA	1–4, 6–8
(Germany) Team Motopark	Mercedes-AMG GT3 Evo	Mercedes-AMG M159 6.2 L V8	65	(Germany) Timo Rumpfkeil	PA	5
(Germany) Team Motopark	Mercedes-AMG GT3 Evo	Mercedes-AMG M159 6.2 L V8	65	(Italy) Matteo Cairoli	PA	7
(Germany) Team Motopark	Mercedes-AMG GT3 Evo	Mercedes-AMG M159 6.2 L V8	74	(Netherlands) Yelmer Buurman	PA	7
(Germany) Team Motopark	Mercedes-AMG GT3 Evo	Mercedes-AMG M159 6.2 L V8	74	(Netherlands) Remon Vos	PA	7
(United Kingdom) Elite Motorsport with Entire Race Engineering	Ferrari 296 GT3	Ferrari F163 3.0 L Turbo V6	17	(United Kingdom) Tom Emson	P	All
(United Kingdom) Elite Motorsport with Entire Race Engineering	Ferrari 296 GT3	Ferrari F163 3.0 L Turbo V6	17	(United Kingdom) Tom Lebbon	P	All
(Italy) Dinamic GT	Porsche 911 GT3 R (992)	Porsche M97/80 4.2 L Flat-6	18	Maksim Kizilov (Note: Kizilov and Nesov are Russian, but they compete as neutral competitors as Russian national emblems were banned by the FIA following the Russian invasion of Ukraine. Petrov, also a Russian, competes under an Israeli license for the same reason.)	P	1
(Italy) Dinamic GT	Porsche 911 GT3 R (992)	Porsche M97/80 4.2 L Flat-6	18	Alexey Nesov	P	1
(Italy) Oregon Team	Lamborghini Huracán GT3 Evo 2	Lamborghini DGF 5.2 L V10	19	(Poland) Robin Rogalski	P	All
(Italy) Oregon Team	Lamborghini Huracán GT3 Evo 2	Lamborghini DGF 5.2 L V10	19	(Romania) Filip Ugran	P	1–3
(Italy) Oregon Team	Lamborghini Huracán GT3 Evo 2	Lamborghini DGF 5.2 L V10	19	(Italy) Leonardo Pulcini	P	4–5
(Italy) Oregon Team	Lamborghini Huracán GT3 Evo 2	Lamborghini DGF 5.2 L V10	19	(France) Enzo Géraci	P	6
(Italy) Oregon Team	Lamborghini Huracán GT3 Evo 2	Lamborghini DGF 5.2 L V10	19	(Portugal) Rodrigo Testa	P	7–8
(Italy) Oregon Team	Lamborghini Huracán GT3 Evo 2	Lamborghini DGF 5.2 L V10	63	(Israel) Artem Petrov	P	All
(Italy) Oregon Team	Lamborghini Huracán GT3 Evo 2	Lamborghini DGF 5.2 L V10	63	(France) Antoine Doquin	P	1–5
(Italy) Oregon Team	Lamborghini Huracán GT3 Evo 2	Lamborghini DGF 5.2 L V10	63	(Italy) Mirko Bortolotti	P	6
(Italy) Oregon Team	Lamborghini Huracán GT3 Evo 2	Lamborghini DGF 5.2 L V10	63	(Italy) Francesco Simonazzi	P	7–8
(Germany) SPS Automotive Performance	Mercedes-AMG GT3 Evo	Mercedes-AMG M159 6.2 L V8	20	(Austria) Dominik Baumann	PA	All
(Germany) SPS Automotive Performance	Mercedes-AMG GT3 Evo	Mercedes-AMG M159 6.2 L V8	20	(Germany) Valentin Pierburg	PA	All
(Germany) CBRX by SPS	Mercedes-AMG GT3 Evo	Mercedes-AMG M159 6.2 L V8	54	(Switzerland) Yannick Mettler	PA	1–7
(Germany) CBRX by SPS	Mercedes-AMG GT3 Evo	Mercedes-AMG M159 6.2 L V8	54	(Switzerland) Dexter Müller	PA	1–7
(Italy) AF Corse	Ferrari 296 GT3	Ferrari F163 3.0 L Turbo V6	21	(Switzerland) Gino Forgione	Am	All
(Italy) AF Corse	Ferrari 296 GT3	Ferrari F163 3.0 L Turbo V6	21	(Italy) Michele Rugolo	Am	All
(Italy) AF Corse	Ferrari 296 GT3	Ferrari F163 3.0 L Turbo V6	51	(Thailand) Carl Bennett	P	All
(Italy) AF Corse	Ferrari 296 GT3	Ferrari F163 3.0 L Turbo V6	51	(Italy) Tommaso Mosca	P	All
(Italy) AF Corse	Ferrari 296 GT3	Ferrari F163 3.0 L Turbo V6	55	(Belgium) Laurent De Meeûs	PA	1–4, 7–8
(Italy) AF Corse	Ferrari 296 GT3	Ferrari F163 3.0 L Turbo V6	55	(Monaco) Vincent Abril	PA	1, 4, 8
(Italy) AF Corse	Ferrari 296 GT3	Ferrari F163 3.0 L Turbo V6	55	(United Kingdom) Jamie Stanley	PA	2–3, 7
(Italy) AF Corse	Ferrari 296 GT3	Ferrari F163 3.0 L Turbo V6	62	(Egypt) Ibrahim Badawi	P	8
(Italy) AF Corse	Ferrari 296 GT3	Ferrari F163 3.0 L Turbo V6	62	(Italy) Leonardo Colavita	P	8
(Czech Republic) FullinRace by Interaction	Audi R8 LMS Evo II	Audi DAR 5.2 L V10	22	(Czech Republic) Petr Fulín	Am	3, 8
(Czech Republic) FullinRace by Interaction	Audi R8 LMS Evo II	Audi DAR 5.2 L V10	22	(Czech Republic) Jiři Navrátil	Am	3, 8
(Czech Republic) Team ISR	Audi R8 LMS Evo II	Audi DAR 5.2 L V10	23	(Slovakia) Christian Malcharek	PA	4
(Czech Republic) Team ISR	Audi R8 LMS Evo II	Audi DAR 5.2 L V10	23	(Slovakia) Jirko Malcharek	PA	4
(Czech Republic) Team ISR	Audi R8 LMS Evo II	Audi DAR 5.2 L V10	75	(Czech Republic) Libor Milota	PA	All
(Czech Republic) Team ISR	Audi R8 LMS Evo II	Audi DAR 5.2 L V10	75	(Czech Republic) Filip Salaquarda	PA	All
(France) Saintéloc Racing	Audi R8 LMS Evo II	Audi DAR 5.2 L V10	26	(Norway) Marcus Påverud	PA; 1–2, 4–8; P 3	1–7
(France) Saintéloc Racing	Audi R8 LMS Evo II	Audi DAR 5.2 L V10	26	(France) Michael Blanchemain	PA; 1–2, 4–8; P 3	1–2, 4–8
(France) Saintéloc Racing	Audi R8 LMS Evo II	Audi DAR 5.2 L V10	26	(Belgium) Matisse Lismont	PA; 1–2, 4–8; P 3	3
(France) Saintéloc Racing	Audi R8 LMS Evo II	Audi DAR 5.2 L V10	26	(France) Jim Pla	PA; 1–2, 4–8; P 3	8
(United Kingdom) Greystone GT	McLaren 720S GT3 Evo	McLaren M840T 4.0 L Turbo V8	27	(Australia) Jayden Kelly	P	6–8
(United Kingdom) Greystone GT	McLaren 720S GT3 Evo	McLaren M840T 4.0 L Turbo V8	27	(United Kingdom) Josh Rattican	P	6–8
(United Kingdom) Greystone GT	McLaren 720S GT3 Evo	McLaren M840T 4.0 L Turbo V8	33	(United Kingdom) James Kell	P	All
(United Kingdom) Greystone GT	McLaren 720S GT3 Evo	McLaren M840T 4.0 L Turbo V8	33	(United Kingdom) Dean MacDonald	P	All
(Belgium) BDR Grupo Prom Racing Team	Mercedes-AMG GT3 Evo	Mercedes-AMG M159 6.2 L V8	28	(Mexico) Luis Michael Dörrbecker	P 1–4, 6–7; PA; 5	1–7
(Belgium) BDR Grupo Prom Racing Team	Mercedes-AMG GT3 Evo	Mercedes-AMG M159 6.2 L V8	28	(Belgium) Amaury Bonduel	P 1–4, 6–7; PA; 5	1–5
(Belgium) BDR Grupo Prom Racing Team	Mercedes-AMG GT3 Evo	Mercedes-AMG M159 6.2 L V8	77	(Mexico) Alfredo Hernández Ortega	Am; 1–7; PA; 8	All
(Belgium) BDR Grupo Prom Racing Team	Mercedes-AMG GT3 Evo	Mercedes-AMG M159 6.2 L V8	77	(France) Stéphane Tribaudini	Am; 1–7; PA; 8	2
(Belgium) BDR Grupo Prom Racing Team	Mercedes-AMG GT3 Evo	Mercedes-AMG M159 6.2 L V8	77	(Mexico) Luis Michael Dörrbecker	Am; 1–7; PA; 8	8
(Germany) Car Collection Motorsport	Porsche 911 GT3 R (992)	Porsche M97/80 4.2 L Flat-6	31	(Switzerland) Alex Fontana	PA	1–5
(Germany) Car Collection Motorsport	Porsche 911 GT3 R (992)	Porsche M97/80 4.2 L Flat-6	31	(United States) "Hash"	PA	1–5
(Germany) Car Collection Motorsport	Porsche 911 GT3 R (992)	Porsche M97/80 4.2 L Flat-6	31	Maksim Kizilov	PA	6
(Germany) Car Collection Motorsport	Porsche 911 GT3 R (992)	Porsche M97/80 4.2 L Flat-6	31	Alexey Nesov	PA	6
(United Kingdom) Steller Motorsport	Chevrolet Corvette Z06 GT3.R	Chevrolet LT6.R 5.5 L V8	42	(Canada) Adam Ali	P	7
(United Kingdom) Steller Motorsport	Chevrolet Corvette Z06 GT3.R	Chevrolet LT6.R 5.5 L V8	42	(Canada) Daniel Ali	P	7
(Germany) Rinaldi Racing	Ferrari 296 GT3	Ferrari F163 3.0 L Turbo V6	45	(Germany) Christian Hook	PA	2
(Germany) Rinaldi Racing	Ferrari 296 GT3	Ferrari F163 3.0 L Turbo V6	45	(Germany) Felipe Fernández Laser	PA	2
(United Kingdom) Track Focused	McLaren 720S GT3 Evo	McLaren M840T 4.0 L Turbo V8	68	(United Kingdom) Darren Kell	Am	6, 8
(United Kingdom) Track Focused	McLaren 720S GT3 Evo	McLaren M840T 4.0 L Turbo V8	68	(United Kingdom) Darren Leung	Am	8
(Ukraine) Tsunami RT	Porsche 911 GT3 R (992)	Porsche M97/80 4.2 L Flat-6	79	(Italy) Fabio Babini	PA	All
(Ukraine) Tsunami RT	Porsche 911 GT3 R (992)	Porsche M97/80 4.2 L Flat-6	79	(Italy) Johannes Zelger	PA	All
(Ukraine) Tsunami RT	Porsche 911 GT3 R (992)	Porsche M97/80 4.2 L Flat-6	89	(Switzerland) Alex Fontana	PA	8
(Ukraine) Tsunami RT	Porsche 911 GT3 R (992)	Porsche M97/80 4.2 L Flat-6	89	(Canada) Bashar Mardini	PA	8
(Germany) Mertel Motorsport	Ferrari 488 GT3 Evo 2020	Ferrari F154CB 3.9 L Turbo V8	80	(Germany) Luca Ludwig	PA; 1 P 2–3	1–3
(Germany) Mertel Motorsport	Ferrari 488 GT3 Evo 2020	Ferrari F154CB 3.9 L Turbo V8	80	(Italy) Andrea Montermini	PA; 1 P 2–3	2–3
(Germany) Mertel Motorsport	Ferrari 488 GT3 Evo 2020	Ferrari F154CB 3.9 L Turbo V8	80	(Spain) Iván Velasco	PA; 1 P 2–3	1
(Iceland) Team Thor	Porsche 911 GT3 R (992)	Porsche M97/80 4.2 L Flat-6	86	(Iceland) Þorvaldur Gissurarson	Am	1, 5, 7
(Iceland) Team Thor	Porsche 911 GT3 R (992)	Porsche M97/80 4.2 L Flat-6	86	(Iceland) Auðunn Guðmundsson	Am	1, 5, 7
(United Arab Emirates) Into Africa Racing by Dragon Racing	Ferrari 296 GT3	Ferrari F163 3.0 L Turbo V6	88	(South Africa) Xolile Letlaka	PA	5–7
(United Arab Emirates) Into Africa Racing by Dragon Racing	Ferrari 296 GT3	Ferrari F163 3.0 L Turbo V6	88	(Zimbabwe) Axcil Jefferies	PA	5, 7
(United Arab Emirates) Into Africa Racing by Dragon Racing	Ferrari 296 GT3	Ferrari F163 3.0 L Turbo V6	88	(South Africa) Stuart White	PA	6
(Austria) Baron Motorsport Team	Ferrari 296 GT3	Ferrari F163 3.0 L Turbo V6	91	(Italy) Giacomo Altoè	PA	6
(Austria) Baron Motorsport Team	Ferrari 296 GT3	Ferrari F163 3.0 L Turbo V6	91	(Austria) Ernst Kirchmayr	PA	6
(Austria) Baron Motorsport Team	Ferrari 296 GT3	Ferrari F163 3.0 L Turbo V6	92	(Italy) Edoardo Bacci	PA	2, 4, 6
(Austria) Baron Motorsport Team	Ferrari 296 GT3	Ferrari F163 3.0 L Turbo V6	92	(Austria) Philipp Baron	PA	4, 6
(Austria) Baron Motorsport Team	Ferrari 296 GT3	Ferrari F163 3.0 L Turbo V6	92	(Iran) Masoud Jaberian	PA	2
(Denmark) Poulsen Motorsport	BMW M4 GT3 Evo	BMW S58B30T0 3.0 L Twin Turbo I6	95	(Germany) Jens Klingmann	P	6
(Denmark) Poulsen Motorsport	BMW M4 GT3 Evo	BMW S58B30T0 3.0 L Twin Turbo I6	95	(Denmark) Kristian Poulsen	P	6
(Malaysia) Johor Motorsports Racing JMR	Chevrolet Corvette Z06 GT3.R	Chevrolet LT6.R 5.5 L V8	99	(Malaysia) Prince Abu Bakar Ibrahim	PA	2
(Malaysia) Johor Motorsports Racing JMR	Chevrolet Corvette Z06 GT3.R	Chevrolet LT6.R 5.5 L V8	99	(Malaysia) Prince Jefri Ibrahim	PA	2
(Italy) Auto Sport Racing	Lamborghini Huracán GT3 Evo 2	Lamborghini DGF 5.2 L V10	180	(Germany) Michael Fischbaum	PA	8
(Italy) Auto Sport Racing	Lamborghini Huracán GT3 Evo 2	Lamborghini DGF 5.2 L V10	180	(Serbia) Miloš Pavlović	PA	8
(Bahrain) 2 Seas Motorsport	Mercedes-AMG GT3 Evo	Mercedes-AMG M159 6.2 L V8	222	(United Kingdom) McKenzy Cresswell	PA	7
(Bahrain) 2 Seas Motorsport	Mercedes-AMG GT3 Evo	Mercedes-AMG M159 6.2 L V8	222	(United Kingdom) Charles Dawson	PA	7
(Slovakia) Racing Trevor	BMW M4 GT3 Evo	BMW S58B30T0 3.0 L Twin Turbo I6	500	(Slovakia) Antal Zsigó	PA; 4, 6, 8 Am; 7	4, 6–8
(Slovakia) Racing Trevor	BMW M4 GT3 Evo	BMW S58B30T0 3.0 L Twin Turbo I6	500	(Germany) Max Hesse	PA; 4, 6, 8 Am; 7	4, 6, 8
(Slovakia) Racing Trevor	BMW M4 GT3 Evo	BMW S58B30T0 3.0 L Twin Turbo I6	500	(Czech Republic) Dennis Waszek	PA; 4, 6, 8 Am; 7	7

Icon	Class
P	Pro Cup
PA	Pro-Am Cup
Am	Am Cup

== Race results ==
Bold indicates overall winner. In the Pole Position column, bold indicates the driver who set the qualifying lap.

Round		Circuit	Pole position	Pro Winner	Pro-Am Winner	Am Winner
1	R1	(Portugal) Algarve International Circuit	(Germany) No. 9 GetSpeed	**(United Kingdom) No. 33 Greystone GT**	(Germany) No. 20 SPS Automotive Performance	(Italy) No. 21 AF Corse
1	R1	(Portugal) Algarve International Circuit	(United States) Anthony Bartone **(Germany) Fabian Schiller**	**(United Kingdom) James Kell** **(United Kingdom) Dean MacDonald**	(Austria) Dominik Baumann (Germany) Valentin Pierburg	(Switzerland) Gino Forgione (Italy) Michele Rugolo
1	R2	(Portugal) Algarve International Circuit	(Germany) No. 31 Car Collection Motorsport	**(Germany) No. 11 Team Motopark**	(Germany) No. 31 Car Collection Motorsport	(United Kingdom) No. 188 Garage 59
1	R2	(Portugal) Algarve International Circuit	(Switzerland) **Alex Fontana** (United States) "Hash"	**(Italy) Matteo Cairoli** **(Hungary) Levente Révész**	(Switzerland) Alex Fontana (United States) "Hash"	(Portugal) Miguel Ramos (United Kingdom) Mark Sansom
2		(Belgium) Circuit de Spa-Francorchamps	(United Kingdom) No. 33 Greystone GT	**(Germany) No. 11 Team Motopark**	(Germany) No. 6 Getspeed	(United Kingdom) No. 188 Garage 59
2		(Belgium) Circuit de Spa-Francorchamps	(United Kingdom) James Kell (United Kingdom) Dean MacDonald	**(Germany) Maximilian Götz** **(Hungary) Levente Révész**	(Luxembourg) Steve Jans (United Kingdom) Aaron Walker	(Portugal) Miguel Ramos (United Kingdom) Mark Sansom
3	R1	(Germany) Hockenheimring	(United Kingdom) No. 8 Garage 59	**(United Kingdom) No. 8 Garage 59**	(Germany) No. 6 GetSpeed	(United Kingdom) No. 188 Garage 59
3	R1	(Germany) Hockenheimring	(United Kingdom) Tom Fleming **(Germany) Marvin Kirchhöfer**	**(United Kingdom) Tom Fleming** **(Germany) Marvin Kirchhöfer**	(Luxembourg) Steve Jans (United Kingdom) Aaron Walker	(United Kingdom) Mark Sansom (Sweden) Alexander West
3	R2	(Germany) Hockenheimring	(United Kingdom) No. 8 Garage 59	**(United Kingdom) No. 8 Garage 59**	(Czech Republic) No. 75 Team ISR	(Italy) No. 21 AF Corse
3	R2	(Germany) Hockenheimring	**(United Kingdom) Tom Fleming** (Germany) Marvin Kirchhöfer	**(United Kingdom) Tom Fleming** **(Germany) Marvin Kirchhöfer**	(Czech Republic) Libor Milota (Czech Republic) Filip Salaquarda	(Switzerland) Gino Forgione (Italy) Michele Rugolo
4	R1	(Hungary) Hungaroring	(United Kingdom) No. 17 Elite Motorsport with Entire Race Engineering	**(United Kingdom) No. 17 Elite Motorsport with Entire Race Engineering**	(Austria) No. 92 Baron Motorsport Team	(Italy) No. 21 AF Corse
4	R1	(Hungary) Hungaroring	(United Kingdom) Tom Emson **(United Kingdom) Tom Lebbon**	**(United Kingdom) Tom Emson** **(United Kingdom) Tom Lebbon**	(Italy) Edoardo Bacci (Austria) Philipp Baron	(Switzerland) Gino Forgione (Italy) Michele Rugolo
4	R2	(Hungary) Hungaroring	(Austria) No. 1 Eastalent Racing Team	**(Austria) No. 1 Eastalent Racing Team**	(Germany) No. 6 GetSpeed	(Italy) No. 21 AF Corse
4	R2	(Hungary) Hungaroring	(Austria) Simon Reicher **(Germany) Christopher Haase**	**(Austria) Simon Reicher** **(Germany) Christopher Haase**	(Luxembourg) Steve Jans (United Kingdom) Aaron Walker	(Switzerland) Gino Forgione (Italy) Michele Rugolo
5	R1	(France) Circuit Paul Ricard	(Germany) No. 9 GetSpeed	**(Germany) No. 11 Team Motopark**	(Germany) No. 20 SPS Automotive Performance	(Italy) No. 21 AF Corse
5	R1	(France) Circuit Paul Ricard	(United States) Anthony Bartone **(Germany) Fabian Schiller**	**(Germany) Maximilian Götz** **(Hungary) Levente Révész**	(Austria) Dominik Baumann (Germany) Valentin Pierburg	(Switzerland) Gino Forgione (Italy) Michele Rugolo
5	R2	(France) Circuit Paul Ricard	(Italy) No. 51 AF Corse	**(Italy) No. 51 AF Corse**	(Germany) No. 65 Team Motopark	(Italy) No. 21 AF Corse
5	R2	(France) Circuit Paul Ricard	(Thailand) Carl Bennett **(Italy) Tommaso Mosca**	**(Thailand) Carl Bennett** **(Italy) Tommaso Mosca**	(Austria) Lukas Dunner (Germany) Timo Rumpfkeil	(Switzerland) Gino Forgione (Italy) Michele Rugolo
6	R1	(Austria) Red Bull Ring	(Slovakia) No. 500 Racing Trevor	**(Italy) No. 51 AF Corse**	(Austria) No. 92 Baron Motorsport Team	(United Kingdom) No. 188 Garage 59
6	R1	(Austria) Red Bull Ring	**(Germany) Max Hesse** (Slovakia) Antal Zsigó	**(Thailand) Carl Bennett** **(Italy) Tommaso Mosca**	(Italy) Edoardo Bacci (Austria) Philipp Baron	(Italy) Marco Pulcini (United Kingdom) Mark Sansom
6	R2	(Austria) Red Bull Ring	(Austria) No. 91 Baron Motorsport Team	**(United Kingdom) No. 33 Greystone GT**	(Austria) No. 91 Baron Motorsport Team	(Italy) No. 21 AF Corse
6	R2	(Austria) Red Bull Ring	**(Italy) Giacomo Altoè** (Austria) Ernst Kirchmayr	**(United Kingdom) James Kell** **(United Kingdom) Dean MacDonald**	(Italy) Giacomo Altoè (Austria) Ernst Kirchmayr	(Switzerland) Gino Forgione (Italy) Michele Rugolo
7	R1	(Spain) Circuit de Barcelona-Catalunya	(United Kingdom) No. 27 Greystone GT	**(Germany) No. 11 Team Motopark**	(Germany) No.54 CBRX by SPS	(Slovakia) No. 500 Racing Trevor
7	R1	(Spain) Circuit de Barcelona-Catalunya	(Australia) Jayden Kelly **(United Kingdom) Josh Rattican**	**(Germany) Maximilian Götz** **(Hungary) Levente Révész**	(Switzerland) Yannick Mettler (Switzerland) Dexter Müller	(Czech Republic) Dennis Waszek (Slovakia) Antal Zsigó
7	R2	(Spain) Circuit de Barcelona-Catalunya	(Austria) No. 1 Eastalent Racing Team	**(Italy) No. 51 AF Corse**	(Germany) No. 6 GetSpeed	(Italy) No. 21 AF Corse
7	R2	(Spain) Circuit de Barcelona-Catalunya	(Austria) Simon Reicher **(Germany) Christopher Haase**	**(Thailand) Carl Bennett** **(Italy) Tommaso Mosca**	(Luxembourg) Steve Jans (United Kingdom) Aaron Walker	(Switzerland) Gino Forgione (Italy) Michele Rugolo
8		(Italy) Autodromo Nazionale di Monza	(Germany) No. 11 Team Motopark	**(Italy) No. 51 AF Corse**	(Ukraine) No. 89 Tsunami RT	(United Kingdom) No. 188 Garage 59
8		(Italy) Autodromo Nazionale di Monza	(Germany) Maximilian Götz (Hungary) Levente Révész	**(Thailand) Carl Bennett** **(Italy) Tommaso Mosca**	(Switzerland) Alex Fontana (Canada) Bashar Mardini	(Italy) Marco Pulcini (United Kingdom) Mark Sansom

== Championship standings ==
=== Points systems ===
Points were awarded to the top 10 (Pro), top 8 (Pro-Am) or top 6 (Am, Teams) classified finishers. If less than 6 participants started the race or if less than 75% of the original race distance was completed, half points were awarded. For the Endurance Race (Spa, Monza) points were multiplied by 2. At the end of the season, the 2 lowest race scores were dropped; if the points dropped were those obtained in endurance races, that counted as 2 races; however, the dropped races could not be the result of disqualification or race bans.

==== Overall ====
Position	1st	2nd	3rd	4th	5th	6th	7th	8th	9th	10th
Points	15	12	10	8	6	5	4	3	2	1

==== Pro-Am ====
Position	1st	2nd	3rd	4th	5th	6th	7th	8th
Points	10	8	6	5	4	3	2	1

==== Am and Teams ====
Position	1st	2nd	3rd	4th	5th	6th
Points	10	8	6	4	3	2

=== Drivers' championship ===
==== Overall ====
Pos.	Driver	Team	(Portugal) ALG		(Belgium) SPA	(Germany) HOC		(Hungary) HUN		(France) LEC		(Austria) RBR		(Spain) CAT		(Italy) MNZ	Pts	Net Points
1	(Hungary) Levente Révész	(Germany) Team Motopark	4	1	1	6	3	6	3	1	10	12	5	1	8	3	143	142
2	(Thailand) Carl Bennett (Italy) Tommaso Mosca	(Italy) AF Corse	7	4	5	7	6	9	2	3	1	1	6	6	1	1	142	136
3	(Germany) Christopher Haase (Austria) Simon Reicher	(Austria) Eastalent Racing Team	2	5	2	2	2	5	1	26†	6	3	18	2	7	4	134	134
4	(United Kingdom) Tom Emson (United Kingdom) Tom Lebbon	(United Kingdom) Elite Motorsport with Entire Race Engineering	5	3	7	3	4	1	4	5	4	25	2	Ret	4	2	123	123
5	(Germany) Maximilian Götz	(Germany) Team Motopark			1	6	3			1	10	12	5	1	8	3	105	105
6	(United Kingdom) James Kell (United Kingdom) Dean MacDonald	(United Kingdom) Greystone GT	1	6	Ret	Ret	9	3	5	4	3	17	1	9	2	5	97	97
7	(United States) Anthony Bartone	(Germany) GetSpeed	3	7	3	15	5	13	6	2	5	2	10	3	9	10	90	90
8	(United Kingdom) Zac Meakin (United Kingdom) Michael Porter	(United Kingdom) Optimum Motorsport	6	2	4	4	7	2	9	6	2	19	13	5	5	25	88	88
9	(Germany) Fabian Schiller	(Germany) GetSpeed	3	7	3	15	5			2	5	2	10	3	9		83	83
10	(Australia) Jayden Kelly (United Kingdom) Josh Rattican	(United Kingdom) Greystone GT										4	3	4	3	Ret	36	36
11	(United Kingdom) Tom Fleming (Germany) Marvin Kirchhöfer	(United Kingdom) Garage 59				1	1										30	30
12	(Israel) Artem Petrov	(Italy) Oregon Team	12	16	9	11	10	18	16	9	7	11	4	12	10	8	26	26
13	(Italy) Matteo Cairoli	(Germany) Team Motopark	4	1										18	17		23	23
14	(Luxembourg) Steve Jans (United Kingdom) Aaron Walker	(Germany) GetSpeed	11	17	8	8	22	15	7	17	9	16	8	11	6	Ret	23	23
15	(Mexico) Marcelo Ramírez (Estonia) Ralf Aron	(Germany) GetSpeed	15	9	17	5	Ret	4	18	8	25	20	17	15	16	16	19	19
16	(Austria) Dominik Baumann (Germany) Valentin Pierburg	(Germany) SPS Automotive Performance	8	12	10	10	16	20	10	7	22	9	12	8	11	11	16	16
17	(Switzerland) Philip Ellis	(Germany) Team Motopark						6	3								15	15
18	(Poland) Robin Rogalski	(Italy) Oregon Team	20	23	18	16	17	7	12	14	Ret	21	20	Ret	18	6	14	14
19	(Germany) Niklas Krütten (Romania) Robert Vișoiu	(Germany) Team Motopark	9	13	6	17	Ret	12	15								12	12
20	(Switzerland) Alex Fontana	(Germany) Car Collection Motorsport	10	8	12	22	Ret	25†	Ret	13	21						12	12
20	(Switzerland) Alex Fontana	(Ukraine) Tsunami RT														7	12	12
21	(France) Antoine Doquin	(Italy) Oregon Team	12	16	9	11	10	18	16	9	7						11	11
22	(Portugal) Rodrigo Testa	(Italy) Oregon Team												Ret	18	6	10	10
23	(Italy) Edoardo Bacci	(Austria) Baron Motorsport Team			28			8	17			5	15				9	9
24	(Austria) Philipp Baron	(Austria) Baron Motorsport Team						8	17			5	15				9	9
25	(Czech Republic) Libor Milota (Czech Republic) Filip Salaquarda	(Czech Republic) Team ISR	14	18	13	14	11	16	8	15	24†	6	16	10	20	14	9	9
26	(Italy) Mirko Bortolotti	(Italy) Oregon Team										11	4				8	8
27	(Italy) Francesco Simonazzi	(Italy) Oregon Team												12	10	8	7	7
28	(Norway) Marcus Påverud	(France) Saintéloc Racing	26	19	14	9	8	11	21	10	14	24	21	14	Ret		6	6
29	(Germany) Luca Stolz	(Germany) GetSpeed						13	6								5	5
30	(Switzerland) Yannick Mettler (Switzerland) Dexter Müller	(Germany) CBRX by SPS	16	14	WD	12	12	10	22	12	11	Ret	25	7	13		5	5
31	(Belgium) Matisse Lismont	(France) Saintéloc Racing				9	8										5	5
32	(Italy) Leonardo Pulcini	(Italy) Oregon Team						7	12	14	Ret						4	4
33	(Italy) Giacomo Altoè (Austria) Ernst Kirchmayr	(Austria) Baron Motorsport Team										14	7				4	4
34	(Slovakia) Antal Zsigó	(Slovakia) Racing Trevor						21	20			7	27	21	24	17	4	4
35	(Germany) Max Hesse	(Slovakia) Racing Trevor						21	20			7	27			17	4	4
36	(United States) "Hash"	(Germany) Car Collection Motorsport	10	8	12	22	Ret	25†	Ret	13	21						4	4
37	(Sweden) Alexander West	(United Kingdom) Garage 59				18	21	23	24	23	17					9	4	4
38	(Poland) Karol Basz (Poland) Marcin Jedliński	(Poland) Olimp Racing	19	24	11	21	Ret	26	13	19	12	8	14	17	27	13	3	3
39	(Austria) Lukas Dunner	(Germany) Team Motopark	13	15	16	24	13	14	11	27†	8	18	30†			18	3	3
40	(Germany) Timo Rumpfkeil	(Germany) Team Motopark								27†	8						3	3
41	Maksim Kizilov; Alexey Nesov	(Italy) Dinamic GT	23	11													2	2
41	Maksim Kizilov; Alexey Nesov	(Germany) Car Collection Motorsport										13	9				2	2
42	(France) Michael Blanchemain	(France) Saintéloc Racing	26	19	14			11	21	10	14	24	21	14	Ret	12	1	1
43	(Mexico) Luis Michael Dörrbecker	(Belgium) BDR Grupo Prom Racing Team	17	10	19	26	24	17	14	11	16	26	22	19	23	24	1	1
44	(Belgium) Amaury Bonduel	(Belgium) BDR Grupo Prom Racing Team	17	10	19	26	24	17	14	11	16						1	1
45	(Germany) Jens Klingmann (Denmark) Kristian Poulsen	(Denmark) Poulsen Motorsport										10	11				1	1
46	(Germany) Heiko Neumann	(Germany) Team Motopark	13	15	16	24	13	14	11			18	30†	18	17	18	0	0
47	(United Kingdom) McKenzy Cresswell (United Kingdom) Charles Dawson	(Bahrain) 2 Seas Motorsport												13	12		0	0
48	(Germany) Luca Ludwig	(Germany) Mertel Motorsport	24	26	15	13	23										0	0
49	(Italy) Andrea Montermini	(Germany) Mertel Motorsport			15	13	23										0	0
50	(South Africa) Xolile Letlaka	(United Arab Emirates) Into Africa Racing by Dragon Racing								16	13	23	Ret	25	19		0	0
51	(Zimbabwe) Axcil Jefferies	(United Arab Emirates) Into Africa Racing by Dragon Racing								16	13			25	19		0	0
52	(Netherlands) Yelmer Buurman (Netherlands) Remon Vos	(Germany) Team Motopark										15	Ret	26	14		0	0
53	(Italy) Fabio Babini (Italy) Johannes Zelger	(Ukraine) Tsunami RT	18	22	21	23	14	19	28†	20	23	22	19	22	25	19	0	0
54	(Canada) Adam Ali (Canada) Daniel Ali	(United Kingdom) Steller Motorsport												16	15		0	0
55	(Switzerland) Gino Forgione (Italy) Michele Rugolo	(Italy) AF Corse	22	28	25	20	18	22	23	18	15	32	23	27	22	22	0	0
56	(Belgium) Laurent De Meeus	(Italy) AF Corse	21	21	23	25	15	24	19					20	21	21	0	0
57	(United Kingdom) Jamie Stanley	(Italy) AF Corse			23	25	15							20	21		0	0
58	(Romania) Filip Ugran	(Italy) Oregon Team	20	23	18	16	17										0	0
59	(United Kingdom) Mark Sansom	(United Kingdom) Garage 59	25	25	22	18	21	23	24	23	17	27	24	24	26	20	0	0
60	(Mexico) Alfredo Hernández Ortega	(Belgium) BDR Grupo Prom Racing Team	Ret	31	27	Ret	25	29	27	24	18	30	28	28	29	24	0	0
61	(Poland) Stanisław Jedliński (Poland) Krystian Korzeniowski	(Poland) Olimp Racing	Ret	30	29	Ret	19	28	26	25	19	31	Ret	29	30	23	0	0
62	(Czech Republic) Petr Fulín (Czech Republic) Jiři Navrátil	(Czech Republic) FullinRace by Interaction				19	20									Ret	0	0
63	(Monaco) Vincent Abril	(Italy) AF Corse	21	21				24	19							21	0	0
64	(France) Enzo Géraci	(Italy) Oregon Team										21	20				0	0
65	(Iceland) Þorvaldur Gissurarson (Iceland) Auðunn Guðmundsson	(Iceland) Team Thor	29	27						22	20			30	28		0	0
66	(Italy) Marco Pulcini	(United Kingdom) Garage 59										27	24			20	0	0
67	(Australia) Brenton Grove (Australia) Stephen Grove	(Australia) Iron Lynx - Grove Racing	27	20													0	0
68	(Germany) Christian Hook (Germany) Felipe Fernández Laser	(Germany) Rinaldi Racing			20												0	0
69	(Zimbabwe) Ameerh Naran	(Germany) Vimana by GetSpeed	28	29	24					21	WD	29	26	23	31	Ret	0	0
70	(Czech Republic) Dennis Waszek	(Slovakia) Racing Trevor												21	24		0	0
71	(Portugal) Miguel Ramos	(United Kingdom) Garage 59	25	25	22												0	0
72	(South Africa) Stuart White	(United Arab Emirates) Into Africa Racing by Dragon Racing										23	Ret				0	0
73	(Spain) Iván Velasco	(Germany) Mertel Motorsport	24	26													0	0
74	(United Kingdom) Charlie Hollings	(United Kingdom) Garage 59												24	26		0	0
75	(United Kingdom) Tom Jackson	(Germany) Vimana by GetSpeed	WD	WD	24											Ret	0	0
76	(Slovakia) Jirko Malchárek (Slovakia) Christian Malchárek	(Czech Republic) Team ISR						27	25								0	0
77	(United Kingdom) Darren Kell	(United Kingdom) Track Focused										28	29			26	0	0
78	(Malaysia) Prince Abu Bakar Ibrahim (Malaysia) Prince Jefri Ibrahim	(Malaysia) Johor Motorsports Racing JMR			26												0	0
79	(France) Stéphane Tribaudini	(Belgium) BDR Grupo Prom Racing Team			27												0	0
80	(Iran) Masoud Jaberian	(Austria) Baron Motorsport Team			28												0	0
Ineligible for championship
–	(Canada) Bashar Mardini	(Ukraine) Tsunami RT														7	–	–
–	(Germany) Benjamin Goethe	(United Kingdom) Garage 59														9	–	–
–	(Netherlands) Renger van der Zande	(Germany) GetSpeed														10	–	–
–	(France) Jim Pla	(France) Saintéloc Racing														12	–	–
–	(Egypt) Ibrahim Badawi (Italy) Leonardo Colavita	(Italy) AF Corse														15	–	–
–	(United Kingdom) Darren Leung	(United Kingdom) Track Focused														26	–	–
–	(Germany) Michael Fischbaum (Serbia) Miloš Pavlović	(Italy) Auto Sport Racing														Ret	–	–

==== Pro-Am ====
Pos.	Driver	Team	(Portugal) ALG		(Belgium) SPA	(Germany) HOC		(Hungary) HUN		(France) LEC		(Austria) RBR		(Spain) CAT		(Italy) MNZ	Pts	Net Points
1	(Austria) Dominik Baumann (Germany) Valentin Pierburg	(Germany) SPS Automotive Performance	1	2	2	2	6	8	3	1	9	5	4	2	2	3	100	98
2	(Luxembourg) Steve Jans (United Kingdom) Aaron Walker	(Germany) GetSpeed	3	5	1	1	7	5	1	8	4	9	2	4	1	Ret	89	89
3	(Czech Republic) Libor Milota (Czech Republic) Filip Salaquarda	(Czech Republic) Team ISR	5	6	5	4	1	6	2	6	11	2	7	3	8	6	67	66
4	(Switzerland) Yannick Mettler (Switzerland) Dexter Müller	(Germany) CBRX by SPS	6	3	WD	3	2	2	10	4	3	Ret	10	1	4		57	57
5	(Switzerland) Alex Fontana	(Germany) Car Collection Motorsport	2	1	4	6	Ret	11	Ret	5	8						56	56
5	(Switzerland) Alex Fontana	(Ukraine) Tsunami RT														1	56	56
6	(Poland) Karol Basz (Poland) Marcin Jedliński	(Poland) Olimp Racing	8	11	3	5	Ret	12	5	9	4	4	5	7	11	5	45	45
7	(Austria) Lukas Dunner	(Germany) Team Motopark	4	4	7	8	3	4	4	11	1	10	12			8	43	43
8	(France) Michael Blanchemain	(France) Saintéloc Racing	11	7	6			3	9	2	6	13	9	6	Ret	4	38	38
9	(Germany) Heiko Neumann	(Germany) Team Motopark	4	4	7	8	3	4	4			10	12	8	6	8	37	37
10	(United States) "Hash"	(Germany) Car Collection Motorsport	2	1	4	6	Ret	11	Ret	5	8						36	36
11	(Norway) Marcus Påverud	(France) Saintéloc Racing	11	7	6			3	9	2	6	13	9	6	Ret		28	28
12	(Italy) Edoardo Bacci	(Austria) Baron Motorsport Team			13			1	6			1	6				26	26
13	(Austria) Philipp Baron	(Austria) Baron Motorsport Team						1	6			1	6				26	26
14	(Sweden) Alexander West	(United Kingdom) Garage 59														2	16	16
15	(Italy) Giacomo Altoè (Austria) Ernst Kirchmayr	(Austria) Baron Motorsport Team										7	1				12	12
16	(Italy) Fabio Babini (Italy) Johannes Zelger	(Ukraine) Tsunami RT	7	10	9	7	4	7	12	10	10	11	8	10	10	9	12	12
17	(Slovakia) Antal Zsigó (Germany) Max Hesse	(Slovakia) Racing Trevor						9	8			3	11			7	11	11
18	(Germany) Timo Rumpfkeil	(Germany) Team Motopark								11	1						10	10
19	(United Kingdom) McKenzy Cresswell (United Kingdom) Charles Dawson	(Bahrain) 2 Seas Motorsport												5	3		10	10
20	Maksim Kizilov; Alexey Nesov	(Germany) Car Collection Motorsport										6	3				9	9
21	(Mexico) Luis Michael Dörrbecker	(Belgium) BDR Grupo Prom Racing Team								3	7					11	8	8
22	(Belgium) Amaury Bonduel	(Belgium) BDR Grupo Prom Racing Team								3	7						8	8
23	(South Africa) Xolile Letlaka	(United Arab Emirates) Into Africa Racing by Dragon Racing								7	5	12	Ret	11	7		8	8
24	(Zimbabwe) Axcil Jefferies	(United Arab Emirates) Into Africa Racing by Dragon Racing								7	5			11	7		8	8
25	(Belgium) Laurent De Meeus	(Italy) AF Corse	9	9	10	9	5	10	7					9	9	10	6	6
26	(United Kingdom) Jamie Stanley	(Italy) AF Corse			10	9	5							9	9		4	4
27	(Netherlands) Yelmer Buurman (Netherlands) Remon Vos	(Germany) Team Motopark										8	Ret	12	5		5	5
28	(Italy) Matteo Cairoli	(Germany) Team Motopark												8	6		4	4
29	(Monaco) Vincent Abril	(Italy) AF Corse	9	9				10	7							10	2	2
30	(Germany) Christian Hook (Germany) Felipe Fernández Laser	(Germany) Rinaldi Racing			8												2	2
31	(Australia) Brenton Grove (Australia) Stephen Grove	(Australia) Iron Lynx - Grove Racing	12	8													1	1
32	(Germany) Luca Ludwig (Spain) Iván Velasco	(Germany) Mertel Motorsport	10	12													0	0
33	(Slovakia) Jirko Malchárek (Slovakia) Christian Malchárek	(Czech Republic) Team ISR						13	11								0	0
34	(United Kingdom) Tom Jackson (Zimbabwe) Ameerh Naran	(Germany) Vimana by GetSpeed			11											Ret	0	0
35	(Mexico) Alfredo Hernández Ortega	(Belgium) BDR Grupo Prom Racing Team														11	0	0
36	(South Africa) Stuart White	(United Arab Emirates) Into Africa Racing by Dragon Racing										12	Ret				0	0
37	(Malaysia) Prince Abu Bakar Ibrahim (Malaysia) Prince Jefri Ibrahim	(Malaysia) Johor Motorsports Racing JMR			12												0	0
38	(Iran) Masoud Jaberian	(Austria) Baron Motorsport Team			13												0	0
Ineligible for championship
–	(Canada) Bashar Mardini	(Ukraine) Tsunami RT														1	–	–
–	(Germany) Benjamin Goethe	(United Kingdom) Garage 59														2	–	–
–	(France) Jim Pla	(France) Saintéloc Racing														4	–	–
–	(Germany) Michael Fischbaum (Serbia) Miloš Pavlović	(Italy) Auto Sport Racing														Ret	–	–

==== Am ====
Pos.	Driver	Team	(Portugal) ALG		(Belgium) SPA	(Germany) HOC		(Hungary) HUN		(France) LEC		(Austria) RBR		(Spain) CAT		(Italy) MNZ	Pts	Net Points
1	(Switzerland) Gino Forgione (Italy) Michele Rugolo	(Italy) AF Corse	1	3	2	3	1	1	1	1	1	6	1	4	1	2	130	124
2	(United Kingdom) Mark Sansom	(United Kingdom) Garage 59	2	1	1	1	4	2	2	4	2	1	2	3	3	1	130	122
3	(Poland) Stanisław Jedliński (Poland) Krystian Korzeniowski	(Poland) Olimp Racing	Ret	5	4	Ret	2	3	3	6	4	5	Ret	6	6	3	56	56
4	(Mexico) Alfredo Hernández Ortega	(Belgium) BDR Grupo Prom Racing Team	Ret	6	3	Ret	5	4	4	5	3	4	4	5	5		48	48
5	(Sweden) Alexander West	(United Kingdom) Garage 59				1	4	2	2	4	2						42	42
6	(Italy) Marco Pulcini	(United Kingdom) Garage 59										1	2			1	38	38
6	(Portugal) Miguel Ramos	(United Kingdom) Garage 59	2	1	1												38	38
7	(Zimbabwe) Ameerh Naran	(Germany) Vimana by GetSpeed	3	4						2	WD	3	3	2	7		38	38
8	(Iceland) Þorvaldur Gissurarson (Iceland) Auðunn Guðmundsson	(Iceland) Team Thor	4	2						3	5			7	4		25	25
9	(United Kingdom) Darren Kell	(United Kingdom) Track Focused										2	5			4	19	19
10	(Czech Republic) Dennis Waszek (Slovakia) Antal Zsigó	(Slovakia) Racing Trevor												1	2		18	18
11	(Czech Republic) Petr Fulín (Czech Republic) Jiři Navrátil	(Czech Republic) FullinRace by Interaction				2	3									Ret	14	14
12	(United Kingdom) Charlie Hollings	(United Kingdom) Garage 59												3	3		12	12
13	(France) Stéphane Tribaudini	(Belgium) BDR Grupo Prom Racing Team			3												12	12
Ineligible for championship
–	(United Kingdom) Darren Leung	(United Kingdom) Track Focused														4	–	–
