= Hermann Gassner =

German rally driver

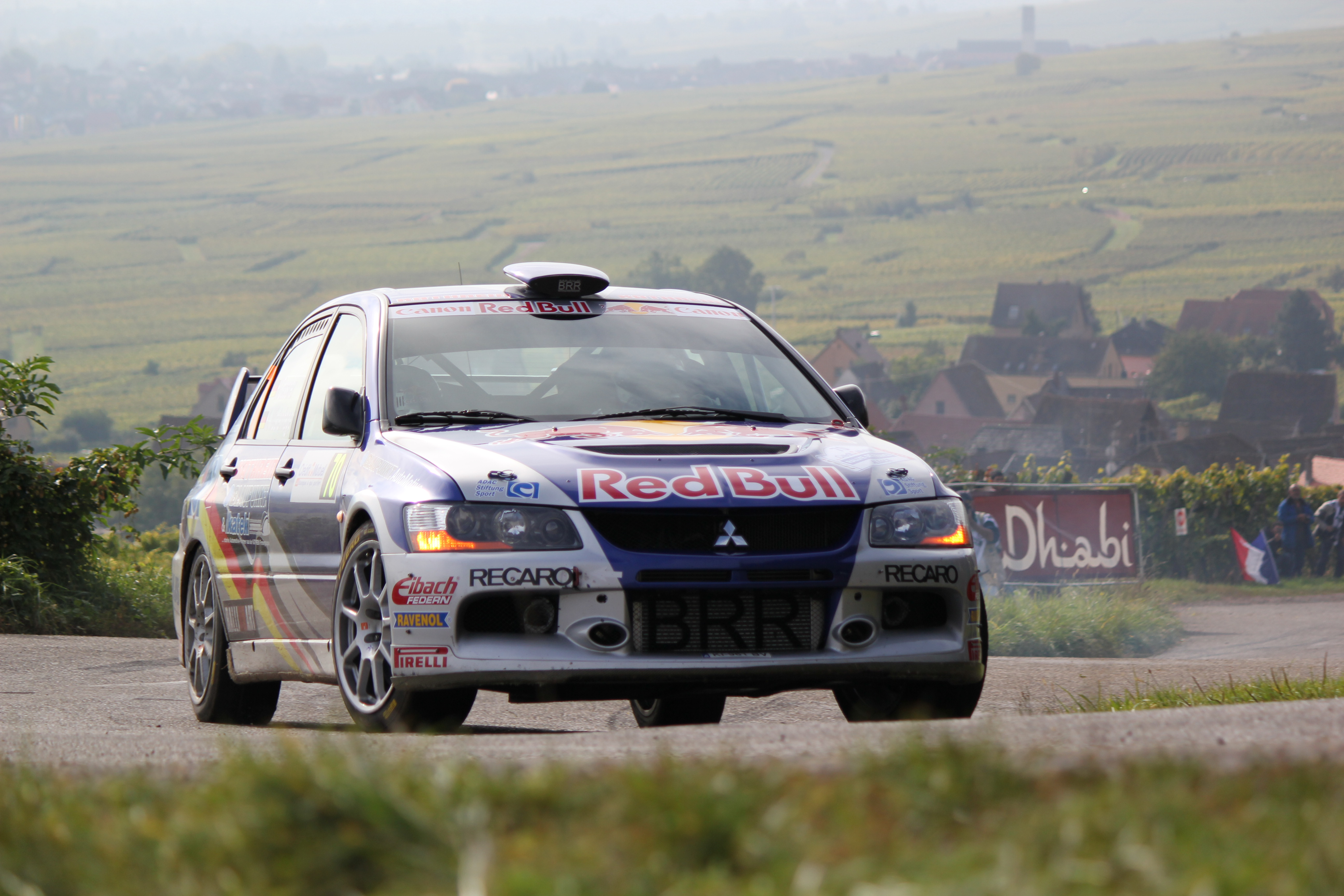
- Gassner on 2010 Rallye de France.

Personal information
- Nationality: (Germany) German
- Born: 29 November 1988 (age 37)

World Rally Championship record
- Years active: 2007 – present
- Co-driver: (Germany) Kathi Wüstenhagen
- Teams: Red Bull Škoda
- Rallies: 28
- Championships: 0
- Rally wins: 0
- Podiums: 0
- Stage wins: 0
- Total points: 0
- First rally: 2007 Rallye Deutschland
- Last updated on: 21 August 2018.

Hermann Gassner Jr (born 29 November 1988 in Bad Reichenhall) is a German rally driver, currently competing in the Super 2000 World Rally Championship (SWRC). His father Hermann Gassner Sr is also a rally driver.

== Career ==
Gassner won the Suzuki Rallye Cup in Germany in 2007, finishing seventh overall in the German Rally Championship and winning Division 4. He made his World Rally Championship debut on Rally Deutschland, which was also a round of the German championship. In 2008, he finished fourth in the German championship in a Mitsubishi Lancer Evo IX. He was also the runner-up in the Mitropa Rally Cup behind his father. He contested the German and British rounds of the WRC, finishing 27th and 20th respectively.

In 2009, Gassner won the German Rally Championship with four wins, as well as the Mitropa Rally Cup. He also entered five rounds of the WRC, with a best result of 12th overall in Portugal. In 2010, Gassner entered six rounds of the WRC in an Evo IX. He finished fourth in the Production World Rally Championship category in Germany, and also finished 13th overall and first in Group N in Spain.

For 2011, Gassner joined the Red Bull Škoda team in the SWRC, finishing third in the category in Jordan, fifth in Sardinia and fourth in Greece.

== World Rally Championship results ==
Year	Entrant	Car	1	2	3	4	5	6	7	8	9	10	11	12	13	14	15	16	WDC	Points
2007	Kathrein Renn- und Rallye Team	Suzuki Ignis Sport	MON	SWE	NOR	MEX	POR	ARG	ITA	GRE	FIN	GER; DNF	NZL	ESP	FRA	JPN	IRE	GBR	NC	0
2008	Hermann Gassner, Jr.	Mitsubishi Lancer Evo IX	MON	SWE	MEX	ARG	JOR	ITA	GRE	TUR	FIN	GER; 27	NZL	ESP	FRA	JPN	GBR; 20		NC	0
2009	Hermann Gassner, Jr.	Mitsubishi Lancer Evo IX	IRE	NOR	CYP	POR; 12	ARG		GRE	POL; Ret	FIN	AUS	ESP; 16						NC	0
2009	Team Sidvin India	Mitsubishi Lancer Evo IX						ITA; Ret						GBR; 25					NC	0
2010	Hermann Gassner, Jr.	Mitsubishi Lancer Evo IX	SWE; 32	MEX	JOR	TUR	NZL	POR; Ret	BUL	FIN	GER; 23	JPN	FRA; 33	ESP; 13	GBR; 31				NC	0
2011	Red Bull Škoda	Škoda Fabia S2000	SWE	MEX	POR	JOR; 12	ITA; 16	ARG	GRE; 14	FIN; 16	GER; 32	AUS	FRA; Ret	ESP; 18	GBR				NC	0
2012	Hermann Gassner, Jr.	Škoda Fabia S2000	MON	SWE	MEX	POR	ARG	GRE	NZL	FIN	GER; 22	GBR	FRA	ITA	ESP				NC	0

=== PWRC results ===
Year	Entrant	Car	1	2	3	4	5	6	7	8	9	PWRC	Points
2009	Team Sidvin India	Mitsubishi Lancer Evo IX	NOR	CYP	POR	ARG	ITA; Ret	GRE	AUS	GBR; 8		24th	1
2010	Hermann Gassner, Jr.	Mitsubishi Lancer Evo IX	SWE	MEX	JOR	NZL	FIN	GER; 4	JPN	FRA	GBR	20th	12

=== SWRC results ===
Year	Entrant	Car	1	2	3	4	5	6	7	8	SWRC	Points
2011	Red Bull Škoda	Škoda Fabia S2000	MEX	JOR; 3	ITA; 5	GRE; 4	FIN; 4	GER; 7	FRA; Ret	ESP; 5	5th	65
