= 2020 Euroformula Open Championship =

Motor racing competition

The 2020 Euroformula Open Championship was a multi-event motor racing championship for single-seater open wheel formula racing cars that was held across Europe. The championship featured drivers competing in the new Dallara 320 car, which features the Halo safety device. It was the seventh Euroformula Open Championship season.

CryptoTower Racing Team driver Yifei Ye won the title after the second race at Barcelona, having won 11 races, 13 pole positions, 12 fastest lap.

== Teams and drivers ==
All teams utilized the new Dallara 320 chassis.

Team	Engine	No.	Driver	Status	Round(s)
(Germany) Team Motopark	Volkswagen	4	(Germany) Niklas Krütten	R	All
(Germany) Team Motopark	Volkswagen	28	(United States) Cameron Das		2, 4–7
(Germany) Team Motopark	Volkswagen	33	(Venezuela) Manuel Maldonado		All
(United Kingdom) Carlin Motorsport	Volkswagen	6	(Israel) Ido Cohen		All
(United Kingdom) Carlin Motorsport	Volkswagen	24	(United Kingdom) Ben Barnicoat		5
(United Kingdom) Carlin Motorsport	Volkswagen	24	(United Kingdom) Jordan King	G	7
(United Kingdom) Carlin Motorsport	Volkswagen	31	(Barbados) Zane Maloney	R	All
(United Kingdom) Double R Racing	Mercedes-Benz	8	(United States) Benjamin Pedersen		6
(United Kingdom) Double R Racing	Mercedes-Benz	8	(Germany) Matthias Lüthen	R	7
(United Kingdom) Double R Racing	Mercedes-Benz	26	(United Kingdom) Ayrton Simmons		1–4
(United Kingdom) Double R Racing	Mercedes-Benz	26	(United Kingdom) Louis Foster		6–7
(Spain) Drivex School	Mercedes-Benz	12	(Netherlands) Glenn van Berlo	R	All
(Spain) Drivex School	Mercedes-Benz	34	(Oman) Shihab Al Habsi	R	1–3
(Spain) Drivex School	Mercedes-Benz	34	(Germany) Matthias Lüthen	R	6
(Spain) Drivex School	Mercedes-Benz	34	(Mexico) Rafael Villagómez	R G	7
(Netherlands) Van Amersfoort Racing	Mercedes-Benz	15	(Germany) Sebastian Estner	R	All
(Netherlands) Van Amersfoort Racing	Mercedes-Benz	16	(Germany) Andreas Estner		All
(Netherlands) Van Amersfoort Racing	Mercedes-Benz	25	(France) Alexandre Bardinon		All
(Japan) CryptoTower Racing	Volkswagen	20	(China) Yifei Ye		All
(Japan) CryptoTower Racing	Volkswagen	69	(Austria) Lukas Dunner		2, 4–7
(Japan) CryptoTower Racing	Volkswagen	99	(Angola) Rui Andrade		All

- Kris Wright was scheduled to compete with Fortec Motorsport but neither him or the team appeared at any rounds.

== Race calendar ==
A nine-round provisional calendar was revealed on 11 October 2019. While Silverstone Circuit was not on this season's calendar, Autodromo di Pergusa was scheduled to debut as a Euroformula Open Championship round. An updated calendar was announced on 22 October 2019.

After the start of the season was delayed due to the 2019-20 coronavirus pandemic, a new 8-round calendar was announced on 21 May 2020. The round at Circuit de Pau-Ville, which was on the original schedule, was not run this season. On 3 June 2020 it was announced that the season opener at Hungaroring was moved back to 23–26 July. On 10 June 2020 the season opener was moved to 8–9 August, while the round at Autodromo di Pergusa was cancelled with plans to run there in 2021. Two of the eight rescheduled events will hold three races to compensate for the loss of one round. On 22 October, the planned season finale at Jarama was cancelled due to rising COVID-19 cases in Europe, and it was announced that Barcelona would hold four races instead.

Round		Circuit	Date	Pole position	Fastest lap	Winning driver	Winning team	Rookie Winner
1	R1	(Hungary) Hungaroring	8 August	(China) Yifei Ye	(China) Yifei Ye	(China) Yifei Ye	(Japan) CryptoTower Racing	(Germany) Sebastian Estner
1	R2	(Hungary) Hungaroring	9 August	(China) Yifei Ye	(China) Yifei Ye	(China) Yifei Ye	(Japan) CryptoTower Racing	(Barbados) Zane Maloney
2	R1	(France) Circuit Paul Ricard, Le Castellet	22 August	(Austria) Lukas Dunner	(Austria) Lukas Dunner	(Austria) Lukas Dunner	(Japan) CryptoTower Racing	(Germany) Niklas Krütten
2	R2	(France) Circuit Paul Ricard, Le Castellet	23 August	(China) Yifei Ye	(China) Yifei Ye	(China) Yifei Ye	(Japan) CryptoTower Racing	(Barbados) Zane Maloney
3	R1	(Austria) Red Bull Ring	12 September	(China) Yifei Ye	(China) Yifei Ye	(China) Yifei Ye	(Japan) CryptoTower Racing	(Germany) Sebastian Estner
3	R2	(Austria) Red Bull Ring	13 September	(China) Yifei Ye	(China) Yifei Ye	(China) Yifei Ye	(Japan) CryptoTower Racing	(Germany) Niklas Krütten
4	R1	(Italy) Autodromo Nazionale Monza	26 September	(China) Yifei Ye	(United States) Cameron Das	(China) Yifei Ye	(Japan) CryptoTower Racing	(Germany) Niklas Krütten
4	R2	(Italy) Autodromo Nazionale Monza	27 September	(Austria) Lukas Dunner (Note: Yifei Ye scored the fastest time in qualifying but was issued a 2-place grid penalty for an incident with Manuel Maldonado. Yifei was still awarded the bonus point for qualifying on pole position despite grid penalty.)	(China) Yifei Ye	(Austria) Lukas Dunner	(Japan) CryptoTower Racing	(Germany) Niklas Krütten
4	R3	(Italy) Autodromo Nazionale Monza	27 September	(China) Yifei Ye	(China) Yifei Ye	(Austria) Lukas Dunner	(Japan) CryptoTower Racing	(Germany) Niklas Krütten
5	R1	(Italy) Mugello Circuit	3 October	(Austria) Lukas Dunner	(Germany) Sebastian Estner	(Austria) Lukas Dunner	(Japan) CryptoTower Racing	(Germany) Niklas Krütten
5	R2	(Italy) Mugello Circuit	4 October	(United Kingdom) Ben Barnicoat	(Austria) Lukas Dunner	(United Kingdom) Ben Barnicoat	(United Kingdom) Carlin Motorsport	(Germany) Niklas Krütten
6	R1	(Belgium) Circuit de Spa-Francorchamps	17 October	(Austria) Lukas Dunner	(Austria) Lukas Dunner	(China) Yifei Ye	(Japan) CryptoTower Racing	(Germany) Sebastian Estner
6	R2	(Belgium) Circuit de Spa-Francorchamps	18 October	(Austria) Lukas Dunner	(China) Yifei Ye	(United Kingdom) Louis Foster	(United Kingdom) Double R Racing	(Netherlands) Glenn van Berlo
6	R3	(Belgium) Circuit de Spa-Francorchamps	18 October	(China) Yifei Ye	(Austria) Lukas Dunner	(Austria) Lukas Dunner	(Japan) CryptoTower Racing	(Germany) Niklas Krütten
7	R1	(Spain) Circuit de Barcelona-Catalunya	31 October	(China) Yifei Ye	(China) Yifei Ye	(China) Yifei Ye	(Japan) CryptoTower Racing	(Germany) Niklas Krütten
7	R2	(Spain) Circuit de Barcelona-Catalunya	31 October	(China) Yifei Ye	(China) Yifei Ye	(China) Yifei Ye	(Japan) CryptoTower Racing	(Netherlands) Glenn van Berlo
7	R3	(Spain) Circuit de Barcelona-Catalunya	1 November	(China) Yifei Ye	(China) Yifei Ye	(China) Yifei Ye	(Japan) CryptoTower Racing	(Barbados) Zane Maloney
7	R4	(Spain) Circuit de Barcelona-Catalunya	1 November	(China) Yifei Ye	(China) Yifei Ye	(China) Yifei Ye	(Japan) CryptoTower Racing	(Germany) Sebastian Estner

== Championship standings ==
=== Drivers' championship ===
- Points were awarded as follows:

1	2	3	4	5	6	7	8	9	10	PP	FL
25	18	15	12	10	8	6	4	2	1	**1**	1

Only the fifteen best race results counted towards the championship.

Pos	Driver	HUN (Hungary)		LEC (France)		RBR (Austria)		MNZ (Italy)			MUG (Italy)		SPA (Belgium)			CAT (Spain)				Pts
Pos	Driver	R1	R2	R1	R2	R1	R2	R1	R2	R3	R1	R2	R1	R2	R3	R1	R2	R3	R4	Pts
1	(China) Yifei Ye	**1**	**1**	2	**1**	**1**	**1**	**1**	2	**2**	(5)	(3)	1	11	**3**	**1**	**1**	**1**	**1**	369
2	(Austria) Lukas Dunner			**1**	3			2	**1**	1	**1**	2	**2**	**13**	1	2	5	4	7	248
3	(Germany) Andreas Estner	2	2	3	4	4	Ret	6	9	4	2	(10)	4	7	8	15	3	5	3	177
4	(Venezuela) Manuel Maldonado	5	6	7	14	2	2	4	Ret	10	11	6	6	12	2	5	4	7	2	153
5	(Germany) Niklas Krütten	8	(10)	5	6	8	3	3	3	3	4	4	12	6	5	3	7	8	(9)	153
6	(United States) Cameron Das			10	8			5	5	6	9	7	5	4	4	7	2	3	6	123
7	(Israel) Ido Cohen	6	4	4	5	5	6	11	Ret	11	6	9	3	2	7	10	11	NC	8	114
8	(Barbados) Zane Maloney	4	3	DNS	2	12	Ret	8	4	7	8	5	14	Ret	12	4	9	6	5	113
9	(Netherlands) Glenn van Berlo	9	9	9	10	7	5	9	8	9	7	8	(10)	3	6	6	6	11	Ret	80
10	(Germany) Sebastian Estner	3	5	13	11	3	4	12	Ret	8	12	11	9	9	9	14	10	14	4	76
11	(United Kingdom) Ayrton Simmons	7	7	6	7	6	7	7	7	5										62
12	(United Kingdom) Louis Foster												7	1	Ret	8	8	2	Ret	57
13	(United Kingdom) Ben Barnicoat										3	**1**								41
14	(Angola) Rui Andrade	11	12	8	9	9	10	10	6	Ret	13	12	11	8	10	9	12	9	10	28
15	(United States) Benjamin Pedersen												8	5	Ret					14
16	(France) Alexandre Bardinon	12	8	12	12	11	9	Ret	Ret	12	10	Ret	13	10	11	11	14	10	Ret	9
17	(Oman) Shihab Al Habsi	10	11	11	13	10	8													6
18	(Germany) Matthias Lüthen												WD	WD	WD	13	15	13	11	0
Guest drivers ineligible to score points
—	(Mexico) Rafael Villagómez															12	13	12	Ret	—
—	(United Kingdom) Jordan King															WD	WD	WD	WD	—
Pos	Driver	R1	R2	R1	R2	R1	R2	R1	R2	R3	R1	R2	R1	R2	R3	R1	R2	R3	R4	Pts
Pos	Driver	HUN (Hungary)		LEC (France)		RBR (Austria)		MNZ (Italy)			MUG (Italy)		SPA (Belgium)			CAT (Spain)				Pts

Colour	Result
Gold	Winner
Silver	Second place
Bronze	Third place
Green	Points classification
Blue	Non-points classification
Blue	Non-classified finish (NC)
Purple	Retired, not classified (Ret)
Red	Did not qualify (DNQ)
Red	Did not pre-qualify (DNPQ)
Black	Disqualified (DSQ)
White	Did not start (DNS)
White	Withdrew (WD)
White	Race cancelled (C)
Blank	Did not practice (DNP)
Blank	Did not arrive (DNA)
Blank	Excluded (EX)

**Bold** – Pole

Italics – Fastest Lap

=== Rookies' championship ===
- Points were awarded as follows:

1	2	3	4	5
10	8	6	4	3

Pos	Driver	HUN (Hungary)		LEC (France)		RBR (Austria)		MNZ (Italy)			MUG (Italy)		SPA (Belgium)			CAT (Spain)				Pts
Pos	Driver	R1	R2	R1	R2	R1	R2	R1	R2	R3	R1	R2	R1	R2	R3	R1	R2	R3	R4	Pts
1	(Germany) Niklas Krütten	8	10	5	6	8	3	3	3	3	4	4	12	6	5	3	7	8	9	140 (150)
2	(Netherlands) Glenn van Berlo	9	9	9	10	7	5	9	8	9	7	8	10	3	6	6	6	11	Ret	112 (116)
3	(Barbados) Zane Maloney	4	3	DNS	2	12	Ret	8	4	7	8	5	14	Ret	12	4	9	6	5	109
4	(Germany) Sebastian Estner	3	5	13	11	3	4	12	Ret	8	12	11	9	9	9	14	10	14	4	101 (104)
5	(Oman) Shihab Al Habsi	10	11	11	13	10	8													23
6	(Germany) Matthias Lüthen												WD	WD	WD	13	15	13	11	15
Guest drivers ineligible to score points
—	(Mexico) Rafael Villagómez															12	13	12	Ret	—
Pos	Driver	R1	R2	R1	R2	R1	R2	R1	R2	R3	R1	R2	R1	R2	R3	R1	R2	R3	R4	Pts
Pos	Driver	HUN (Hungary)		LEC (France)		RBR (Austria)		MNZ (Italy)			MUG (Italy)		SPA (Belgium)			CAT (Spain)				Pts

=== Teams' championship ===
- Points were awarded as follows:

1	2	3	4	5
10	8	6	4	3

Pos	Team	HUN (Hungary)		LEC (France)		RBR (Austria)		MNZ (Italy)			MUG (Italy)		SPA (Belgium)			CAT (Spain)				Pts
Pos	Team	R1	R2	R1	R2	R1	R2	R1	R2	R3	R1	R2	R1	R2	R3	R1	R2	R3	R4	Pts
1	(Japan) CryptoTower Racing	**1**	**1**	**1**	**1**	**1**	**1**	**1**	**1**	1	**1**	2	1	8	1	**1**	**1**	**1**	**1**	244
1	(Japan) CryptoTower Racing	11	12	2	3	9	10	2	2	**2**	5	3	**2**	11	**3**	2	5	4	7	244
2	(Germany) Team Motopark	5	6	5	6	2	2	3	3	3	4	4	5	4	2	3	2	3	2	115
2	(Germany) Team Motopark	8	10	7	8	8	3	4	5	6	9	6	6	6	4	5	4	7	6	115
3	(Netherlands) Van Amersfoort Racing	2	2	3	4	3	4	6	9	4	2	10	4	7	8	11	3	5	3	84
3	(Netherlands) Van Amersfoort Racing	3	5	12	11	4	9	12	Ret	8	10	11	9	9	9	14	10	10	4	84
4	(United Kingdom) Carlin Motorsport	4	3	4	2	5	6	8	4	7	3	**1**	3	2	7	4	9	6	5	76
4	(United Kingdom) Carlin Motorsport	6	4	DNS	5	12	Ret	11	Ret	11	6	5	14	Ret	12	10	11	NC	8	76
5	(United Kingdom) Double R Racing	7	7	6	7	6	7	7	7	5			7	1	Ret	8	8	2	11	24
5	(United Kingdom) Double R Racing												8	5	Ret	13	15	12	Ret	24
6	(Spain) Drivex School	9	9	9	10	7	5	9	8	9	7	8	10	3	6	6	6	11	Ret	9
6	(Spain) Drivex School	10	11	11	13	10	8						WD	WD	WD	12	13	12	Ret	9
Pos	Team	R1	R2	R1	R2	R1	R2	R1	R2	R3	R1	R2	R1	R2	R3	R1	R2	R3	R4	Pts
Pos	Team	HUN (Hungary)		LEC (France)		RBR (Austria)		MNZ (Italy)			MUG (Italy)		SPA (Belgium)			CAT (Spain)				Pts
