= Lukas Dunner =

Austrian racing driver

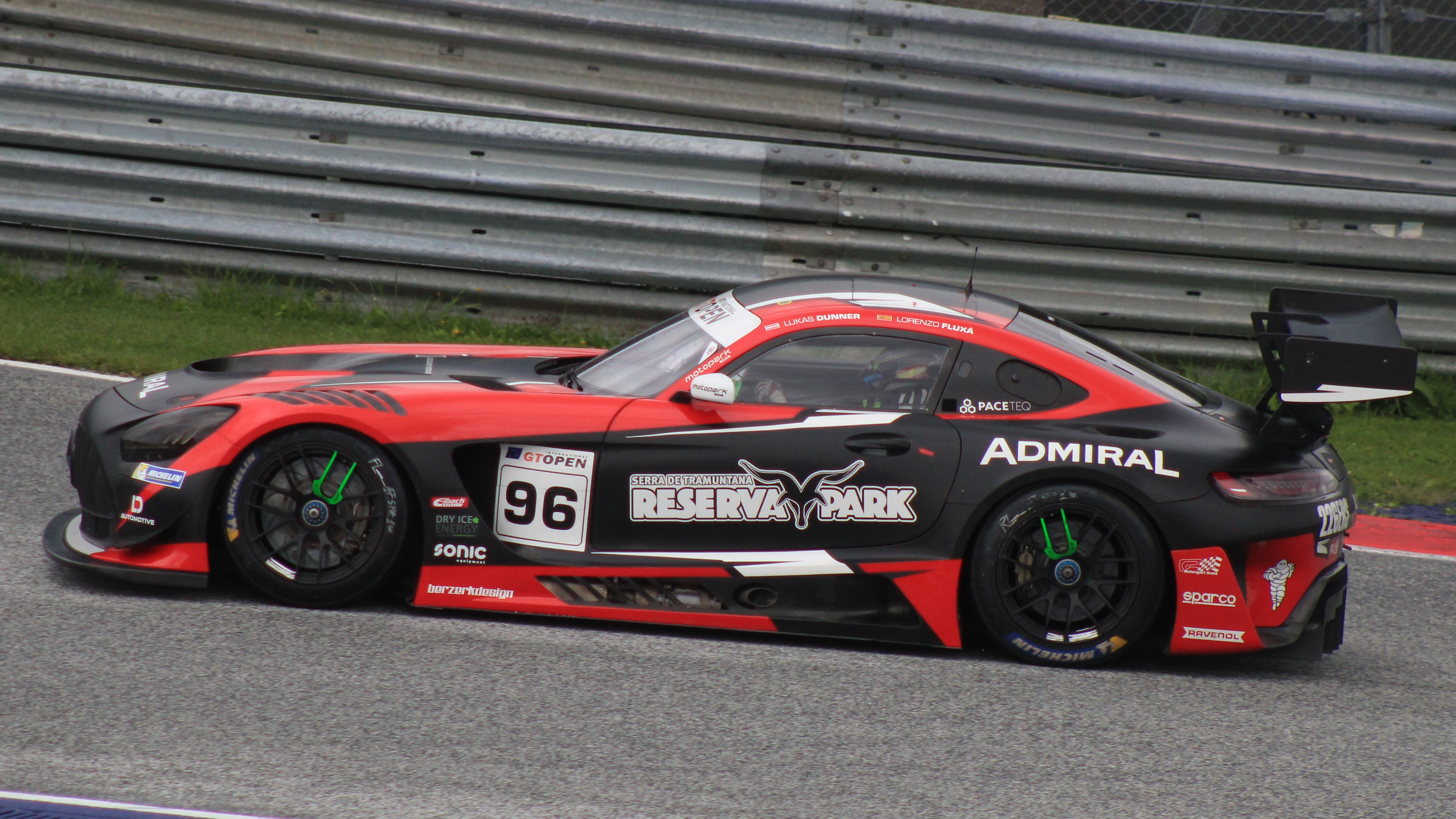
- Nationality: (Austria) Austrian
- Born: 12 February 2002 (age 24) Vienna, Austria

FIA Formula 3 Championship career
- Debut season: 2020
- Current team: MP Motorsport
- Categorisation: FIA Silver
- Car number: 8
- Starts: 18 (18 entries)
- Wins: 0
- Podiums: 0
- Poles: 0
- Fastest laps: 0
- Best finish: 27th in 2020

Previous series
- 2019 2018–2019 2017 2017 2017: European Le Mans Series (LMP2); Euroformula Open Championship; Italian F4 Championship; Spanish F4 Championship; SMP F4 Championship

Championship titles
- 2021: Mitropa Rally Cup

Lukas Dunner (born 12 February 2002) is an Austrian racing driver currently driving for Motopark in the International GT Open. During his early career, he competed in FIA Formula 3 and finished as runner-up in the 2020 Euroformula Open Championship.

== Early career ==
=== Lower series ===
Dunner started karting in 2014 when he was 12 years old. He won the Eastern European Rotax Max Challenge Central championship twice, once in the junior category and one in the mini max category. In 2017, Dunner competed in Spanish F4 for MP Motorsport alongside Bent Viscaal, Christian Lundgaard, Nazim Azman and Marta García. The Austrian finished eighth in the standings with a best result of third at Navarra and Nogaro.

For the 2018 season, Dunner became a member of Drivex, competing for them in the Euroformula Open Championship. As the team's only full-time entrant, Dunner scored two podiums and finished seventh overall. He remained in the series in 2019, this time joining Teo Martín Motorsport. His results improved significantly, as he attained two pole positions and finished on the rostrum six times. With these results, Dunner managed to end up third in the standings, missing out on second to Liam Lawson in the final race of the campaign.

=== Formula 3 and EFO title assault ===
At the end of 2019, Dunner competed in the Macau Grand Prix, driving for MP Motorsport. He qualified a lowly 24th but was able to avoid the carnage of the qualifying race to finish 12th, before dropping to 14th in the main event.

For the 2020 season, Dunner signed on with MP to partner Richard Verschoor and Bent Viscaal the FIA Formula 3 Championship. He was unable to score points throughout the course of the season and finished 27th in the standings, having achieved a best result of 12th place in the feature race at the Hungaroring. Parallel to his F3 commitments, Dunner drove in Euroformula Open once again, this time in a partial campaign for the CryptoTower-badged Motopark team. After winning on his return at Le Castellet, nine further podiums — which included two victories at Monza and a win each at Mugello and Spa — earned him the runner-up spot in the championship.

=== Rallying ===
In 2021, Dunner took part in the Mitropa Rally Cup. Driving a Škoda Fabia R5, the Austrian won the title after taking three rally victories.

== Sportscar career ==
After almost two years out of the driving seat, Dunner returned to racing ahead of the final round of the 2023 International GT Open, piloting a Mercedes-AMG GT3 Evo at his former EFO team Motopark. He and Pro-Am teammate Morten Strømsted took a class podium in their first race together. Thereafter, the Austrian competed in all five races of the 2023–24 Asian Le Mans Series season, partnering bronze-ranked drivers Strømsted and Heiko Neumann. The trio failed to score points throughout the campaign, having claimed a best race finish of 13th in Dubai.

Dunner embarked on a full season in IGTO in 2024, once again driving for Motopark. After being joined by Charles Bateman during the first two rounds, Dunner would be partnered by fellow silver-ranked driver and sportscar newbie Lorenzo Fluxá.

== Karting record ==
=== Karting career summary ===
Season	Series	Team	Position
2014	Rotax Max Challenge Central-Eastern Europe — Mini Max		1st
2014	Euro Finale — Mini Max		2nd
2015	Rotax Max Challenge Central-Eastern Europe — Junior		8th
2015	Rotax Max Euro Challenge — Junior	Speedworld Academy	14th
2015	BNL Karting Series — Rotax Max Junior		21st
2016	Rotax Max Challenge Central-Eastern Europe — Junior		1st
2016	Hungarian International Open Championship — Junior		5th
2016	Rotax International Open — Junior	VPDR	4th

== Racing record ==
=== Career summary ===
Season	Series	Team	Races	Wins	Poles	F/Laps	Podiums	Points	Position
2017	Spanish F4 Championship	MP Motorsport	20	0	0	0	2	129	8th
2017	SMP F4 Championship	MP Motorsport	18	0	0	0	0	24	13th
2017	Italian F4 Championship	Prema Powerteam	3	0	0	0	0	2	NC
2018	Euroformula Open Championship	Drivex School	16	0	0	0	2	83	7th
2018	Spanish Formula 3 Championship	Drivex School	6	0	0	0	0	28	7th
2018	V de V Endurance Series	Wimmer Werk Motorsport	1	0	0	0	1	54	31st
2019	Euroformula Open Championship	Teo Martín Motorsport	18	0	2	2	6	178	**3rd**
2019	Euroformula Open Winter Series	Teo Martín Motorsport	2	0	0	0	0	22	5th
2019	Ultimate Cup Series	Wimmer Werk Motorsport	2	2	0	0	2	75	6th
2019	European Le Mans Series - LMP2	Inter Europol Competition	1	0	0	0	0	0.5	35th
2019	Macau Grand Prix	MP Motorsport	1	0	0	0	0	N/A	14th
2020	FIA Formula 3 Championship	MP Motorsport	18	0	0	0	0	0	27th
2020	Euroformula Open Championship	CryptoTower Racing	14	5	5	4	10	248	**2nd**
2021	Mitropa Rally Cup	Škoda Motorsport	8	3	N/A		5	256	**1st**
2023	International GT Open	Team Motopark	2	0	0	0	0	0	NC†
2023–24	Asian Le Mans Series - GT	Team Motopark	5	0	0	0	0	0	32nd
2024	International GT Open	Team Motopark	14	0	1	1	2	78	9th
2025	Le Mans Cup - GT3	Team Motopark	5	1	1	0	1	38	8th
2025	International GT Open	Team Motopark	12	0	0	0	0	3	39th
2025	International GT Open – Pro-Am	Team Motopark	12	1	0	0	2	43	7th

^{*} Season still in progress.

=== Complete F4 Spanish Championship results ===
(key) (Races in bold indicate pole position) (Races in italics indicate fastest lap)

Year	Team	1	2	3	4	5	6	7	8	9	10	11	12	13	14	15	16	17	18	19	20	Pos	Points
2017	MP Motorsport	ALC; 1; 7	ALC; 2 Ret	ALC; 3; 4	NAV1; 1; 4	NAV1; 2; 5	NAV1; 3 Ret	CAT; 1; 11	CAT; 2; 6	JER; 1; 11	JER; 2; 8	JER; 3; 6	NAV2; 1; 3	NAV2; 2; 4	NAV2; 3; 8	NOG; 1; 6	NOG; 2; 5	NOG; 3; 3	EST; 1; 4	EST; 2; 5	EST; 3 Ret	8th	129

=== Complete SMP F4 Championship results ===
(key) (Races in bold indicate pole position) (Races in italics indicate fastest lap)

Year	Team	1	2	3	4	5	6	7	8	9	10	11	12	13	14	15	16	17	18	19	20	21	Pos	Points
2017	MP Motorsport	SOC; 1; 10	SOC; 2; 13	SOC; 3; 10	SMO; 1	SMO; 2	SMO; 3	AHV; 1 Ret	AHV; 2 Ret	AHV; 3; 13	AUD; 1; 10	AUD; 2; 7	AUD; 3; 13	MSC1; 1; 9	MSC1; 2; 12	MSC1; 3; 10	MSC2; 1; 8	MSC2; 2; 9	MSC2; 3; 8	ASS; 1 Ret	ASS; 2; 5	ASS; 3; 9	13th	24

=== Complete Euroformula Open Championship results ===
(key) (Races in bold indicate pole position; races in italics indicate points for the fastest lap of top ten finishers)

Year	Entrant	1	2	3	4	5	6	7	8	9	10	11	12	13	14	15	16	17	18	DC	Points
2018	Drivex	EST; 1; 6	EST; 2; 12	LEC; 1 Ret	LEC; 2; 14	SPA; 1; 4	SPA; 2; 10	HUN; 1; 9	HUN; 2; 8	SIL; 1; 3	SIL; 2; 5	MNZ; 1; 3	MNZ; 2 Ret	JER; 1; 5	JER; 2 Ret	CAT; 1; 8	CAT; 2 Ret			7th	81
2019	Teo Martín Motorsport	**LEC**; **1**; 3	LEC; 2; 3	PAU; 1; 4	PAU; 2; 4	HOC; 1; 7	HOC; 2; 4	SPA; 1 Ret	SPA; 2; 2	**HUN**; **1**; 2	HUN; 2; 3	RBR; 1; 3	RBR; 2; 4	SIL; 1 Ret	SIL; 2; 9	CAT; 1; 6	CAT; 2 (9)	MNZ; 1; 7	MNZ; 2; 7	3rd	178
2020	CryptoTower Racing	HUN; 1	HUN; 2	**LEC**; **1**; 1	LEC; 2; 3	RBR; 1	RBR; 2	MNZ; 1; 2	**MNZ**; **2**; 1	MNZ; 3; 1	**MUG**; **1**; 1	MUG; 2; 2	**SPA**; **1**; 2	**SPA**; **2**; 13	SPA; 3; 1	CAT; 1; 2	CAT; 2; 5	CAT; 3; 4	CAT; 4; 7	2nd	248

=== Complete FIA Formula 3 Championship results ===
(key) (Races in bold indicate pole position points; races in italics indicate fastest lap points)

Year	Entrant	1	2	3	4	5	6	7	8	9	10	11	12	13	14	15	16	17	18	DC	Points
2020	MP Motorsport	RBR; FEA; 24	RBR; SPR; 14	RBR; FEA; 16	RBR; SPR; 19	HUN; FEA; 12	HUN; SPR; Ret	SIL; FEA; Ret	SIL; SPR; 22	SIL; FEA; 23	SIL; SPR; Ret	CAT; FEA; 21	CAT; SPR; 22	SPA; FEA; 21	SPA; SPR; 13	MNZ; FEA; 14	MNZ; SPR; Ret	MUG; FEA; 21	MUG; SPR; 17	27th	0

=== Complete International GT Open results ===
(key) (Races in bold indicate pole position) (Races in italics indicate fastest lap)

Year	Team	Car	Class	1	2	3	4	5	6	7	8	9	10	11	12	13	14	Pos.	Points
2023	Team Motopark	Mercedes-AMG GT3 Evo	Pro-Am	ALG; 1	ALG; 2	SPA	HUN; 1	HUN; 2	LEC; 1	LEC; 2	RBR; 1	RBR; 2	MNZ; 1	MNZ; 2	CAT; 1; 10	CAT; 2; 13		NC†	0
2024	Team Motopark	Mercedes-AMG GT3 Evo	Pro	ALG; 1; 5	ALG; 2; 10	HOC; 1; 7	HOC; 2; 14	SPA; Ret	HUN; 1; 11	HUN; 2; 6	LEC; 1; 7	LEC; 2; 5	RBR; 1; 5	RBR; 2; 5	CAT; 1; 4	CAT; 2; 2	**MNZ**; 3	9th	78
2025	Team Motopark	Mercedes-AMG GT3 Evo	Pro-Am	ALG; 1; 13	ALG; 2; 15	SPA; 16	HOC; 1; 24	HOC; 2; 13	HUN; 1; 14	HUN; 2; 11	LEC; 1; 27†	LEC; 2; 8	RBR; 1; 18	RBR; 2; 30†	CAT; 1	CAT; 2	MNZ; 18	7th	43

^{*}Season still in progress.

=== Complete Asian Le Mans Series results ===
(key) (Races in bold indicate pole position) (Races in italics indicate fastest lap)

Year	Team	Class	Car	Engine	1	2	3	4	5	Pos.	Points
2023–24	Team Motopark	GT	Mercedes-AMG GT3 Evo	Mercedes-AMG M159 6.2 L V8	SEP; 1; 19	SEP; 2; 16	DUB; 13	ABU; 1; 14	ABU; 2 Ret	32nd	0

=== Complete Le Mans Cup results ===
(key) (Races in bold indicate pole position) (Races in italics indicate the fastest lap)

Year	Entrant	Car	Class	1	2	3	4	5	6	7	DC	Points
2025	Team Motopark	Mercedes-AMG GT3 Evo	GT3	**BAR**; Ret	LEC; 6	LMS; 1; 13	LMS; 2; 1	SPA; 5	SIL	ALG	8th	38

^{*}Season still in progress.
