= Matthias Lüthen =

German racing driver

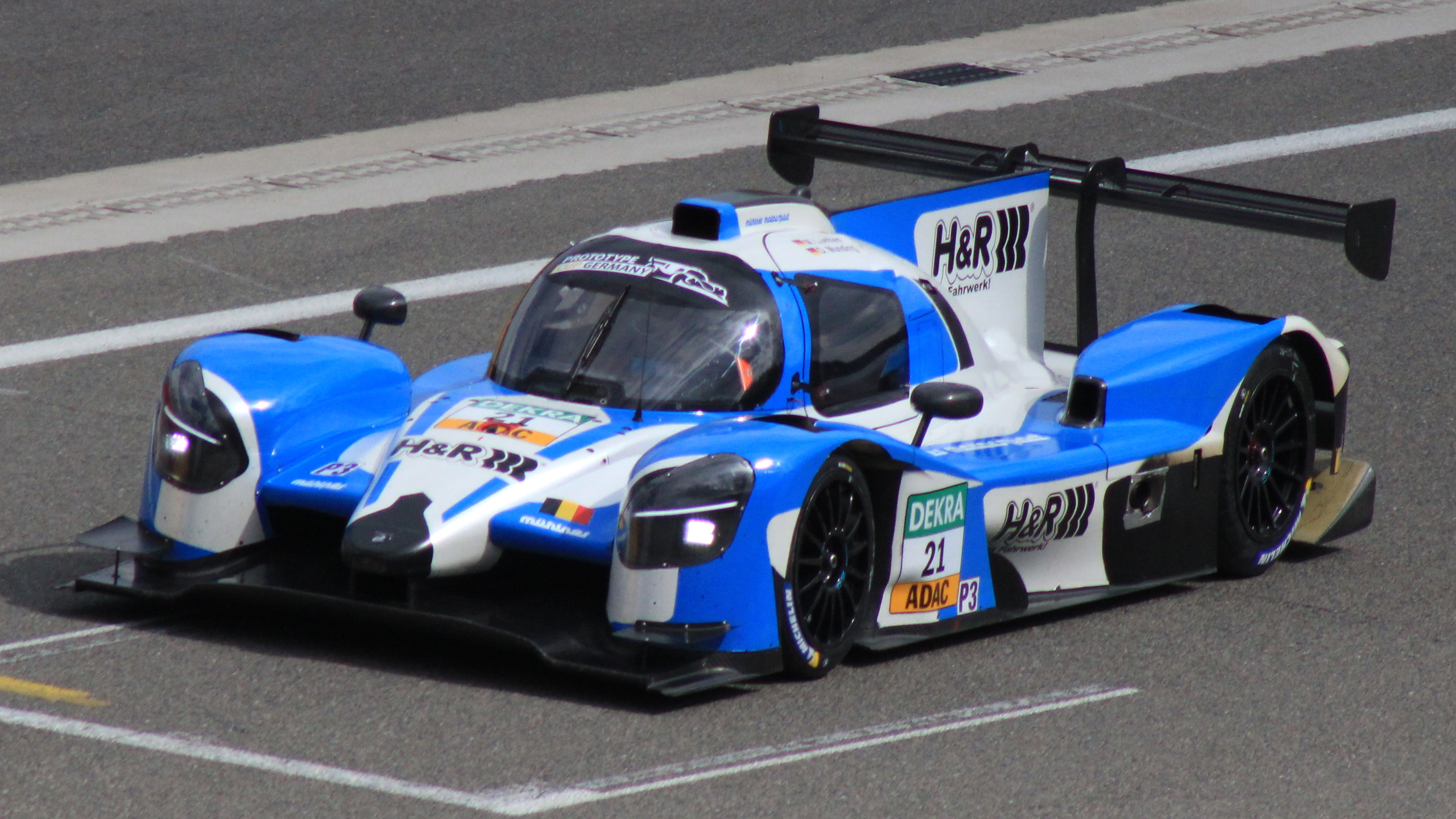
- Nationality: (Germany) German
- Born: 16 December 1980 (age 45) Hamburg, Germany

Euroformula Open Championship career
- Debut season: 2020
- Current team: Team Motopark
- Categorisation: FIA Bronze
- Car number: 40
- Former teams: Drivex School, Double R Racing
- Starts: 7 (7 entries)
- Wins: 0
- Podiums: 0
- Poles: 0
- Fastest laps: 0
- Best finish: 18th in 2020

Previous series
- 2021 2021 2020 2019 2019: Michelin Le Mans Cup; F3 Asian Championship; MAXX Formula; Formula Renault Eurocup; Drexler-Automotive FR2.0 Cup

Matthias Lüthen (born 16 December 1980) is a German businessman and racing driver. He is the founder and managing director of real estate agency Lüthen & Co. Immobilien, and last competed in the Prototype Cup Germany driving a Duqueine M30 - D08 LMP3 for Mühlner Motorsport.

== Racing record ==
=== Racing career summary ===
Season	Series	Team	Races	Wins	Poles	F/Laps	Podiums	Points	Position
2019	Formula Renault Eurocup	GRS	2	0	0	0	0	0	NC†
2019	Drexler-Automotive Formula Renault 2.0 Cup	Luethen Motorsport GmbH	3	0	0	0	2	33	10th
2020	Euroformula Open Championship	Drivex School	0	0	0	0	0	0	18th
2020	Euroformula Open Championship	Double R Racing	4	0	0	0	0	0	18th
2020	MAXX Formula - Advance	Speed-Center	1	0	1	0	0	0	NC
2021	F3 Asian Championship	Pinnacle Motorsport	9	0	0	0	0	0	26th
2021	Le Mans Cup - LMP3	Mühlner Motorsport	1	0	0	0	0	6.5	21st
2021	Le Mans Cup - LMP3	Team Virage	4	0	0	0	0	6.5	21st
2021	Euroformula Open Championship	Team Motopark	3	0	0	0	0	0	23rd
2022	Prototype Cup Germany	Mühlner Motorsport	8	1	1	0	2	93	**3rd**
2023	Asian Le Mans Series - LMP3	Rinaldi Racing	4	0	0	0	0	12	12th
2023	Le Mans Cup - LMP3	MV2S Racing	5	0	0	0	0	13	17th
2023	Prototype Cup Germany	Koiranen Kemppi Motorsport	9	1	1	2	3	111	6th
2023	European Le Mans Series - LMP3	EuroInternational	2	0	0	0	0	1	15th

^{†} As Lüthen was a guest driver, he was ineligible for points.
* Season still in progress.

=== Complete Formula Renault Eurocup results ===
(key) (Races in bold indicate pole position) (Races in italics indicate fastest lap)

Year	Team	1	2	3	4	5	6	7	8	9	10	11	12	13	14	15	16	17	18	19	20	Pos	Points
2019	GRS	MNZ; 1	MNZ; 2	SIL; 1	SIL; 2	MON; 1	MON; 2	LEC; 1	LEC; 2	SPA; 1	SPA; 2	NÜR; 1	NÜR; 2	HUN; 1	HUN; 2	CAT; 1	CAT; 2	HOC; 1	HOC; 2	YMC; 1; 19	YMC; 2; 19	NC†	0

† As Lüthen was a guest driver, he was ineligible for points

=== Complete Euroformula Open Championship results ===
(key) (Races in bold indicate pole position) (Races in italics indicate fastest lap)

Year	Team	1	2	3	4	5	6	7	8	9	10	11	12	13	14	15	16	17	18	19	20	21	22	23	24	Pos	Points
2020	Drivex School	HUN; 1	HUN; 2	LEC; 1	LEC; 2	RBR; 1	RBR; 2	MNZ; 1	MNZ; 2	MNZ; 3	MUG; 1	MUG; 2	SPA; 1 WD	SPA; 2 WD	SPA; 3 WD	CAT; 1; 13	CAT; 2; 15	CAT; 3; 13	CAT; 4; 11							18th	0
2021	Team Motopark	POR; 1	POR; 2	POR; 3	LEC; 1	LEC; 2	LEC; 3	SPA; 1 Ret	SPA; 2; 11	SPA; 3; 11	HUN; 1	HUN; 2	HUN; 3	IMO; 1	IMO; 2	IMO; 3	RBR; 1	RBR; 2	RBR; 3	MNZ; 1	MNZ; 2	MNZ; 3	CAT; 1	CAT; 2	CAT; 3	23rd	0

=== Complete F3 Asian Championship results ===
(key) (Races in bold indicate pole position) (Races in italics indicate fastest lap)

Year	Team	1	2	3	4	5	6	7	8	9	10	11	12	13	14	15	Pos	Points
2021	Pinnacle Motorsport	DUB1; 1; 20	DUB1; 2; 20	DUB1; 3; 17	ABU1; 1; 18	ABU1; 2; 16	ABU1; 3; 18	ABU2; 1; 17	ABU2; 2 Ret	ABU2; 3; 16	DUB2; 1	DUB2; 2	DUB2; 3	ABU3; 1	ABU3; 2	ABU3; 3	26th	0

=== Complete Asian Le Mans Series results ===
(key) (Races in bold indicate pole position) (Races in italics indicate fastest lap)

Year	Team	Class	Car	Engine	1	2	3	4	Pos.	Points
2023	Rinaldi Racing	LMP3	Duqueine M30 - D08	Nissan VK56DE 5.6L V8	DUB; 1; 4	DUB; 2 Ret	ABU; 1 Ret	ABU; 2 Ret	12th	12

=== Complete Prototype Cup Germany results ===
(key) (Races in bold indicate pole position) (Races in italics indicate fastest lap)

Year	Team	Car	Engine	1	2	3	4	5	6	7	8	9	10	11	12	DC	Points
2023	Koiranen Kemppi Motorsport	Duqueine M30 - D08	Nissan VK56DE 5.6 L V8	HOC; 1; 3	HOC; 2 DNS	**OSC**; **1**; 4	OSC; 2; 9	ZAN; 1; 4	ZAN; 2; 6	NOR; 1; 5	NOR; 2; 1	ASS; 1; 3	ASS; 2 Ret	NÜR; 1	NÜR; 2	6th	111

^{*} Season still in progress.
