= Mitropa Rally Cup =

- Category: Super 2000; Group N
- Country: Europe
- Inaugural season: 1965
- Drivers' champion: (Germany) Phillip Geipel
- Official website: mitropa-rally-cup.com

The Mitropa Rally Cup is a rallying competition in Europe often termed the "European Championship for Non-Professional Drivers”. Established in 1965, drivers participate in races in several countries collecting points to determine the cup winner. The series is organised by the Deutscher Motor Sport Bund and takes place in countries all across Europe mainly in Italy, Croatia, Austria, Slovenia and Hungary. The point score system is loaded so that drivers have the potential to score more points in rallies held in nations more distant from their home country making them able to score more points in rallies they are less likely to be familiar with it. The championship is frequently held over six to eight events. In 2023, 9 races are set to be held with a special stop in Switzerland. The historic Rally du Valais will close the 2023 season with its classic, well-known stages.

The series has been dominated by German and Italian drivers. The most successful driver in the series history is German driver Hermann Gassner Sr. who has won the title seven times between 2001 and 2022, all while driving Mitsubishi Lancers. Another German driver, Matthias Moosleitner won the title six times between 1984 and 2000.

The event is not to be confused with the Mitropa Cup, a soccer competition.

== Champions ==
Sourced in part from:

Year	Driver	Car
1965	(Austria) Romberg	Austin Cooper
1966	(Italy) Arnaldo Cavallari	Alfa Romeo GTA
1967	(Austria) Gerhard Tusch	Renault 8 Gordini
1968	(West Germany) Wilfried Gass	Porsche 911 T
1969	(West Germany) Günther Wallrabenstein	BMW 2002 ti
1970	(West Germany) Wilfried Gass	Porsche 911 S
1971	(Italy) Sandro Munari	Lancia Fulvia 1.6 Coupé HF
1972	(Italy) Raffaele Pinto	Fiat 124 Spider
1973	(West Germany) Horst Rack	Porsche 911 S
1974	(West Germany) Horst Rack	Porsche 911 Carrera RS
1975	(Italy) Vanni Tacchini	Fiat 124 Abarth
1976	(Austria) Franz Wittmann Sr.	Opel Kadett GT/E; BMW 2002 ti
1977	(Austria) Franz Wittmann Sr.	Opel Kadett GT/E
1978	(Italy) Vanni Fusaro	Fiat 131 Abarth
1979	(Italy) Luigi Battistolli	Fiat 131 Abarth
1980	(West Germany) Fritz Unterbuchberger	Opel Ascona i2000
1981	(Italy) Mario Aldo Pasetti	Fiat 131 Abarth
1982	(Italy) Franco Corradin	Fiat 131 Abarth
1983	(Italy) Franco Ceccato	Fiat 131 Abarth
1984	(West Germany) Matthias Moosleitner	Opel Manta 400
1985	(West Germany) Matthias Moosleitner	Opel Manta 400
1986	(West Germany) Armin Schwarz	Audi 80 Quattro; MG Metro 6R4
1987	(Czechoslovakia) Jiří Sedlář	Škoda 130 LR
1988	(Germany) Andreas Wetzelsperger	BMW E30 M3
1989	(Germany) Matthias Moosleitner	BMW E30 M3
1990	(Germany) Matthias Moosleitner	BMW E30 M3
1991	(Germany) Matthias Moosleitner	BMW E30 M3
1992	(Germany) Wolfgang Weber	BMW E30 M3
1993	(Germany) Markus Kipple	Nissan Sunny GTI-R
1994	(Italy) Gianmarino Zenere	Ford Escort RS Cosworth
1995	(Germany) Wolfgang Weber	Ford Escort RS Cosworth
1996	(Italy) Claudio De Cecco	Subaru Impreza 555
1997	(Germany) Lothar Ammelounx	Ford Escort RS Cosworth
1998	(Germany) Anton Werner	Mitsubishi Lancer Evo VI
1999	(Italy) Ezio Soppa	Lancia Delta HF Integrale
2000	(Germany) Matthias Moosleitner	Mitsubishi Lancer Evo VI
2001	(Germany) Hermann Gassner Sr.	Proton Pert; Mitsubishi Carisma GT
2002	(Italy) Pier Lorenzo Zanchi	Toyota Corolla WRC; Lancia Delta HF Integrale
2003	(Germany) Ruben Zeltner	Mitsubishi Lancer Evo VI; Mitsubishi Lancer Evo VII
2004	(Italy) Claudio De Cecco	Peugeot 206 WRC; Subaru Impreza STi N10
2005	(Italy) Claudio De Cecco	Subaru Impreza STi N10; Peugeot 206 WRC; Mitsubishi Lancer Evo VIII
2006	(Czech Republic) Jiří Tošovský	Mitsubishi Lancer Evo VII; Mitsubishi Lancer Evo VIII
2007	(Germany) Hermann Gassner Sr.	Mitsubishi Lancer Evo IX
2008	(Germany) Hermann Gassner Sr.	Mitsubishi Lancer Evo IX; Mitsubishi Lancer Evo X
2009	(Germany) Hermann Gassner Jr.	Mitsubishi Lancer Evo X Mitsubishi Lancer Evo IX
2010	(Germany) Hermann Gassner Sr.	Mitsubishi Lancer Evo X Mitsubishi Lancer Evo IX
2011	(Slovenia) Asja Zupanc	Mitsubishi Lancer Evo IX
2012	(Italy) Bernd Zanon	Renault Clio S1600
2013	(Germany) Hermann Gassner Sr.	Mitsubishi Lancer Evo X
2014	(Germany) Manuel Kössler	Subaru Impreza STi
2015	(Germany) Hermann Gassner Sr.	Mitsubishi Lancer Evo X
2016	(Croatia) Krisztián Hideg	Mitsubishi Lancer Evo IX
2017	(Croatia) Krisztián Hideg	Mitsubishi Lancer Evo IX; Ford Fiesta R5; Škoda Fabia R5
2018	(Hungary) Gergely Fogasy	Peugeot 208 T16
2019	(Germany) Hermann Gassner Jr.	Toyota GT86; Hyundai i20 R5
2020	cancelled	
2021	(Austria) Lukas Dunner	Škoda Fabia R5
2022	(Germany) Hermann Gassner Sr.	Mitsubishi Lancer Evo X
2023	(Hungary) András Hadik	Ford Fiesta Rally2
2024	(Germany) Philip Geipel	Škoda Fabia Rally2 evo Toyota GR Yaris Rally2
