= Team Motopark =

German auto racing team

(Germany) Motopark
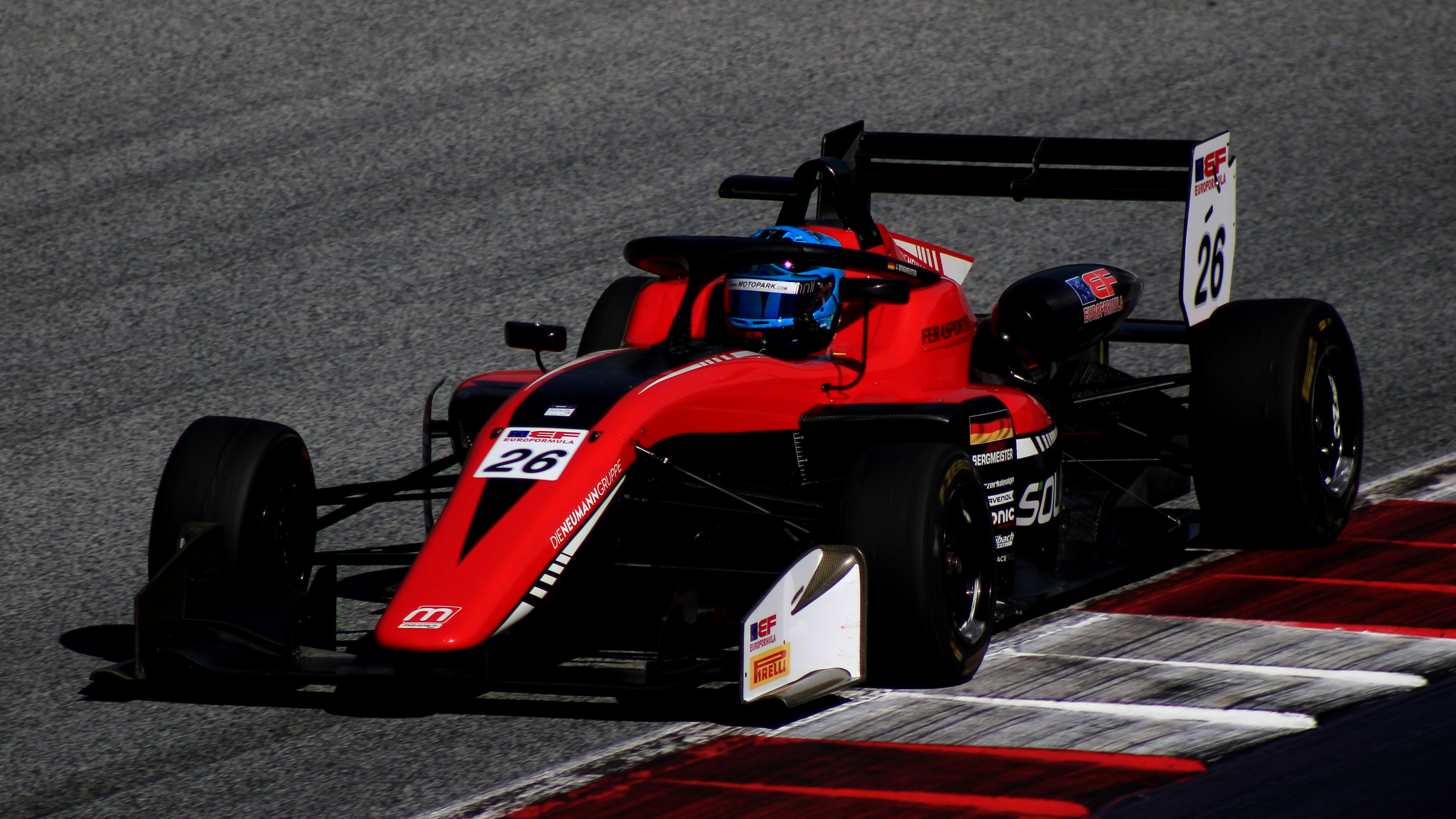
- Founded: 1998
- Founder(s): Timo Rumpfkeil
- Base: Oschersleben, Germany
- Team principal(s): Timo Rumpfkeil
- Current series: Euroformula Open Championship; International GT Open
- Former series: GP2 Series (Note: Operation Team at Russian Time team); Formula 3 Euro Series; European Formula 3 Eurocup Formula Renault 2.0; Formula Renault 2.0 NEC; Porsche Supercup; German Formula Three; ADAC Formel Masters; Japanese Formula 3 British Formula 3 ADAC Formula 4 Formula 4 UAE Championship; Super Formula; Super Formula Lights
- Current drivers: Euroformula Open: (Chinese Taipei) Enzo Yeh (United States) Everett Stack (Mexico) Diego de la Torre (Mexico) Jesse Carrasquedo Jr. International GT Open: (Germany) Maximilian Götz (Australia) Christian Mansell (Austria) Dominik Baumann (Mexico) Marcelo Ramírez
- Teams' Championships: Eurocup Formula Renault 2.0: 2004; Formula Renault 2.0 NEC: 2007, 2008, 2009; ADAC Formel Masters: 2011, 2012; German Formula 3: 2013, 2014; GP2 Series: 2013; Formula 4 UAE Championship: 2016–17, 2017–18; Japanese Formula 3 Championship: 2019; Euroformula Open Championship: 2019, 2020, (Note: Entered as Cryptotower Racing) 2021, 2022, (Note: Entered as Cryptotower Racing) 2023, 2024, 2025, 2026; International GT Open: 2025
- Drivers' Championships: Formula Renault 2.0 Germany: 2004: Scott Speed; Eurocup Formula Renault 2.0: 2004: Scott Speed; 2006: Filipe Albuquerque; 2008: Valtteri Bottas; Formula Renault 2.0 NEC: 2006: Filipe Albuquerque; 2007: Frank Kechele; 2008: Valtteri Bottas; 2009: António Félix da Costa; German Formula 3: 2012: Jimmy Eriksson; 2013: Marvin Kirchhöfer; 2014: Markus Pommer; ADAC Formel Masters: 2012: Marvin Kirchhöfer; Formula 4 UAE Championship: 2016–17: Jonathan Aberdein; 2017–18: Charles Weerts; Japanese Formula 3 Championship: 2019: Sacha Fenestraz; Euroformula Open Championship: 2019: Marino Sato; 2020: Yifei Ye (Note: Entered as Cryptotower Racing); 2021: Cameron Das; 2022: Oliver Goethe; 2023: Noel León; 2024: Brad Benavides; 2026: Enzo Yeh; International GT Open: 2023: Timo Rumpfkeil, Heiko Neumann; 2025: Levente Révész
- Website: http://www.motopark.com/

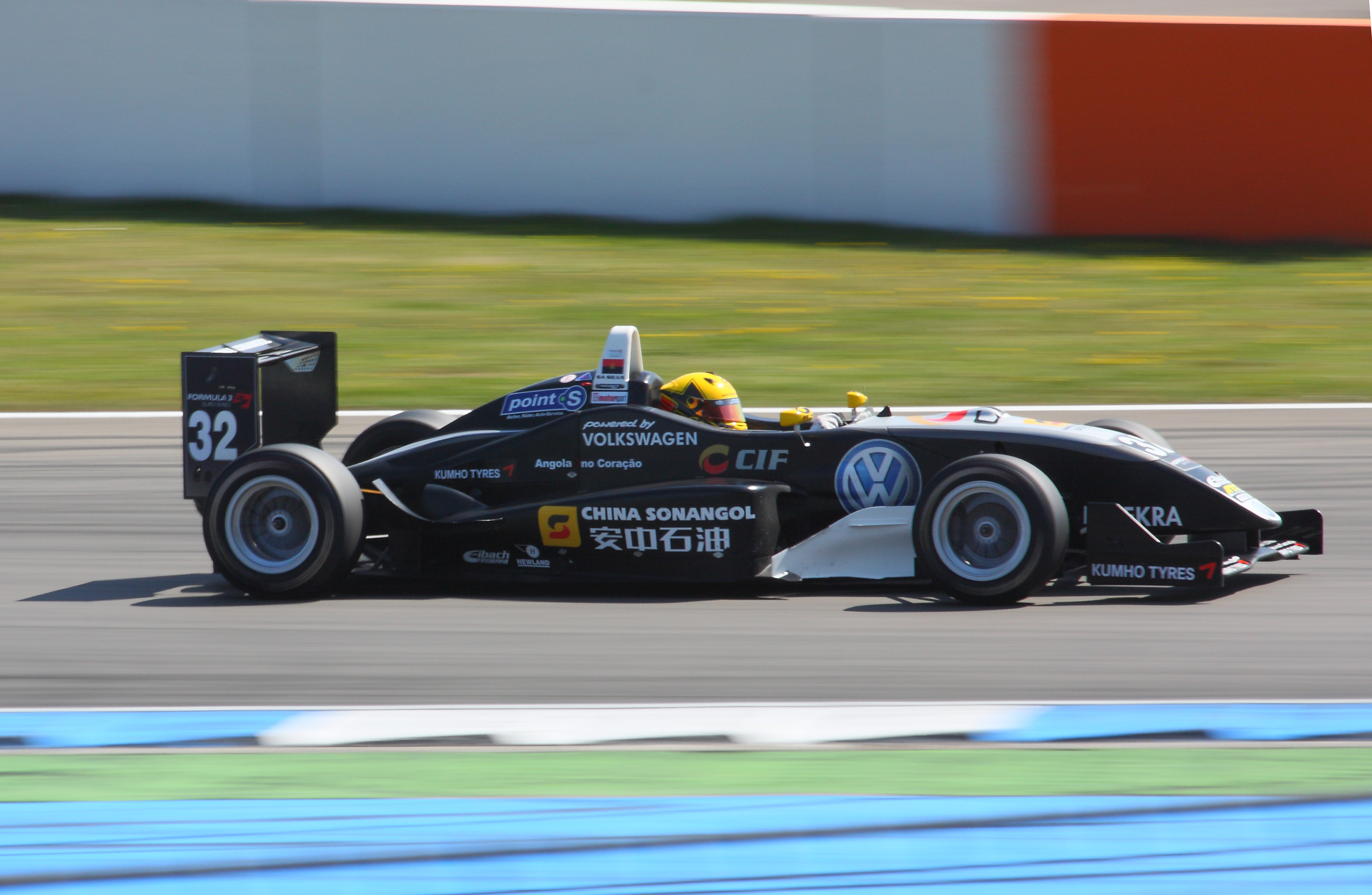
Formula 3 Euroseries, Hockenheimring, #32 Luís Sá Silva

Team Motopark, previously known as Motopark Academy, (raced under Lotus moniker from 2012 to 2014) is an auto racing team based in Oschersleben, Germany, next to the Motorsport Arena Oschersleben race track. In 2013, the team competed in the GP2 Series under the name Russian Time and until 2024 had operated a satellite team called CryptoTower Racing.

== History ==
=== Single-seaters ===
The team have competed in open-wheel racing consistently since the start of the 21st century. They have competed in the Formula 3 Euro Series since 2009.

==== Eurocup Formula Renault 2.0 ====
They were teams' champions in the Eurocup Formula Renault 2.0 in 2004, with their American driver Scott Speed taking the drivers' title with eight wins. Motopark Academy won the drivers' title of the 2006 Eurocup Formula Renault 2.0 season with Filipe Albuquerque, with the Portuguese driver collecting four wins in all.

==== Formula Renault 2.0 Northern European Cup ====
Motopark Academy have won all four Drivers' Championships in Formula Renault 2.0 Northern European Cup, since it formed in 2006. They won with Filipe Albuquerque in 2006, Frank Kechele in 2007, Valtteri Bottas in 2008 and António Félix da Costa in 2009. Motopark Academy also won the Teams' Championship of the Formula Renault 2.0 NEC three times: 2007, 2008 and 2009.

=== GP2 and GP3 Series ===
Russian Time was established by former Russian racing driver and manager Igor Mazepa and Motopark Academy team principal Timo Rumpfkeil in 2013. The team had sought an entry to the GP2 Series for two years before finally being accepted in 2013, replacing iSport International. iSport International withdrew from the series after being unable to secure a budget to compete in the upcoming season, and so its management elected to shut the team down in order to avoid bankruptcy.

The team won its first race in only its fourth appearance, when Sam Bird won the sprint race of the Bahrain round of the championship. The team took a second win on the streets of Monaco, with Bird finishing ahead of Kevin Ceccon after a fourteen-car pile-up on the opening lap forced nine drivers out of the race.

In 2014, the team was set to make their debut in GP3 Series, taking Bamboo Engineering's slot and continue to participate in GP2, German Formula Three and ADAC Formel Masters. The team's preparations for the 2014 season were disrupted by the death of Mazepa from complications relating to thrombosis in February 2014. On 18 February 2014, it was announced that Motopark had ended their partnership with Russian Time, leaving the position of all those drivers signed on for the 2014 GP2 and GP3 seasons, in limbo.

=== Formula 3 and Japanese single-seaters ===
In 2018, Motopark spent last season in the history of FIA Formula 3 European Championship with Jonathan Aberdein, Sebastián Fernández, Fabio Scherer, Marino Sato, Dan Ticktum and Jüri Vips.

Motopark is scheduled to make their debut in Japan in collaboration with the B-Max racing team, competing in Super Formula with Lucas Auer and Harrison Newey and Japanese Formula 3 with Sacha Fenestraz, Enaam Ahmed, 'Dragon' and Tairoku Yamaguchi. The team was also set to partake in the inaugural season of the Formula European Masters Championship reuniting with Sato and signing Red Bull Juniors Yuki Tsunoda and Liam Lawson, but the series ended up being cancelled due to a lack of entrants. In April 2019, it was announced Motopark would switch to the Euroformula Open Championship and retain its intended Formula European Masters line-up with Julian Hanses joining in a fourth car.

== Current series results ==
=== Euroformula Open Championship ===
Year	Car	Drivers	Races	Wins	Poles	F/Laps	Podiums	Points	D.C.	T.C.
2019	Dallara F317-Volkswagen	(Japan) Marino Sato	16	9	6	5	11	307	1st	1st
2019	Dallara F317-Volkswagen	(New Zealand) Liam Lawson	14	4	2	1	7	179	2nd	1st
2019	Dallara F317-Volkswagen	(Japan) Yuki Tsunoda	14	1	0	3	6	151	4th	1st
2019	Dallara F317-Volkswagen	(Germany) Julian Hanses	12	0	1	0	4	98	8th	1st
2019	Dallara F317-Volkswagen	(United States) Cameron Das	10	0	0	1	0	54	12th	1st
2019	Dallara F317-Volkswagen	(Japan) Toshiki Oyu	2	2	2	0	2	52	14th	1st
2019	Dallara F317-Volkswagen	(United Kingdom) Enaam Ahmed	2	0	0	1	2	37	15th	1st
2019	Dallara F317-Volkswagen	(Norway) Dennis Hauger	2	0	0	0	0	18	19th	1st
2019	Dallara F317-Volkswagen	(Germany) Niklas Krütten	6	0	0	0	0	14	20th	1st
2020	Dallara 320-Volkswagen	(Germany) Niklas Krütten	18	0	0	0	5	153	5th	2nd
2020	Dallara 320-Volkswagen	(Venezuela) Manuel Maldonado	18	0	0	0	4	153	4th	2nd
2020	Dallara 320-Volkswagen	(United States) Cameron Das	14	0	0	1	2	123	6th	2nd
2020	Dallara 320-Volkswagen	(China) Yifei Ye	18	11	12	12	16	369	1st	1st (Note: Entered as Cryptotower Racing)
2020	Dallara 320-Volkswagen	(Austria) Lukas Dunner	14	5	5	5	10	248	2nd	1st
2020	Dallara 320-Volkswagen	(Angola) Rui Andrade	18	0	0	0	0	28	14th	1st
2021	Dallara 320-Volkswagen	(United States) Cameron Das	24	7	1	6	16	382	1st	1st
2021	Dallara 320-Volkswagen	(United States) Jak Crawford	16	8	4	12	10	304	3rd	1st
2021	Dallara 320-Volkswagen	(Australia) Christian Mansell †	9	0	0	0	1	79	11th	1st
2021	Dallara 320-Volkswagen	(Czech Republic) Roman Staněk	3	1	0	0	2	55	12th	1st
2021	Dallara 320-Volkswagen	(France) Reshad de Gerus	6	0	0	0	0	30	16th	1st
2021	Dallara 320-Volkswagen	(Hungary) Vivien Keszthelyi	12	0	0	0	0	12	20th	1st
2021	Dallara 320-Volkswagen	(Germany) Matthias Lüthen	3	0	0	0	0	0	23rd	1st
2021	Dallara 320-Volkswagen	(United Kingdom) Louis Foster	24	3	2	4	13	315	2nd	2nd (Note: Entered as Cryptotower Racing)
2021	Dallara 320-Volkswagen	(Malaysia) Nazim Azman	24	1	0	0	7	270	4th	2nd
2021	Dallara 320-Volkswagen	(Poland) Filip Kaminiarz	24	0	0	0	1	80	10th	2nd
2022	Dallara 320-Volkswagen	(Denmark) Oliver Goethe	26	11	7	12	18	499	1st	2nd
2022	Dallara 320-Volkswagen	(United Kingdom) Frederick Lubin	26	1	0	2	9	301	4th	2nd
2022	Dallara 320-Volkswagen	(Mexico) Alex García	26	0	0	0	1	116	7th	2nd
2022	Dallara 320-Volkswagen	(France) Vladislav Lomko	26	6	2	5	19	434	2nd	1st (Note: Entered as Cryptotower Racing)
2022	Dallara 320-Volkswagen	(Australia) Christian Mansell	26	3	1	3	15	381	3rd	1st
2022	Dallara 320-Volkswagen	(United Kingdom) Josh Mason	26	3	0	1	7	278	5th	1st
2023	Dallara 320-Volkswagen	(Mexico) Noel León	23	7	5	11	16	394	1st	1st
2023	Dallara 320-Volkswagen	(United Kingdom) Cian Shields	23	3	0	3	10	307	2nd	1st
2023	Dallara 320-Volkswagen	(United States) Bryce Aron	20	3	0	1	5	238	4th	1st
2023	Dallara 320-Volkswagen	(Hungary) Levente Révész	8	1	0	0	3	103	9th	1st
2023	Dallara 320-Volkswagen	(Germany) Jakob Bergmeister	14	0	0	0	2	148	5th	1st
2023	Dallara 320-Volkswagen	(Germany) Jakob Bergmeister	3	0	0	0	1	148	5th	2nd (Note: Entered as Cryptotower Racing)
2023	Dallara 320-Volkswagen	(Austria) Charlie Wurz	11	1	1	3	5	139	6th	2nd
2023	Dallara 320-Volkswagen	(Switzerland) Joshua Dufek	8	1	0	0	7	138	7th	2nd
2023	Dallara 320-Volkswagen	(Italy) Enzo Trulli	6	2	2	0	3	98	10th	2nd
2023	Dallara 320-Volkswagen	(United Kingdom) Josh Mason	6	1	0	0	3	96	11th	2nd
2023	Dallara 320-Volkswagen	(Germany) Tim Tramnitz	3	0	0	2	3	55	12th	2nd
2023	Dallara 320-Volkswagen	Vladislav Ryabov	3	0	0	0	0	24	15th	2nd
2023	Dallara 320-Volkswagen	(Hungary) Benjámin Berta	3	0	0	0	0	20	16th	2nd
2023	Dallara 320-Volkswagen	(Hungary) Attila Pénzes	3	0	0	0	0	16	17th	2nd
2023	Dallara 320-Volkswagen	(Hong Kong) Gerrard Xie	3	0	0	0	0	8	18th	2nd
2024	Dallara 320-Volkswagen	(United States) Brad Benavides	24	9	4	10	19	431	1st	1st
2024	Dallara 320-Volkswagen	(Brazil) Fernando Barrichello	24	1	0	1	5	264	3rd	1st
2024	Dallara 320-Volkswagen	(Germany) Jakob Bergmeister	18	1	0	0	7	243	4th	1st
2024	Dallara 320-Volkswagen	(Hungary) Levente Révész	18	1	0	2	8	236	5th	1st
2024	Dallara 320-Volkswagen	(South Korea) Michael Shin	12	2	1	1	6	187	6th	1st
2024	Dallara 320-Volkswagen	(Mexico) José Garfias	9	0	1	1	4	99	7th	1st
2024	Dallara 320-Volkswagen	(United Kingdom) Edward Pearson	6	0	0	1	3	80	8th	1st
2024	Dallara 320-Volkswagen	(Spain) Lorenzo Fluxá	3	1	0	1	3	59	9th	1st
2024	Dallara 320-Volkswagen	Vladislav Ryabov	6	1	0	0	1	58	10th	1st
2024	Dallara 320-Volkswagen	(Hong Kong) Gerrard Xie	3	1	0	1	1	36	11th	1st
2024	Dallara 320-Volkswagen	(Mexico) Ricardo Escotto	3	0	0	0	0	18	13th	1st
2024	Dallara 320-Volkswagen	(Luxembourg) Enzo Richer	3	0	0	0	0	16	14th	1st
2024	Dallara 320-Volkswagen	(China) Cenyu Han	0	0	0	0	0	0	NC	1st
2024	Dallara 320-Volkswagen	(Sri Lanka) Yevan David	3	2	0	0	3	0	NC	1st
2025	Dallara 324-TOM'S	(Sri Lanka) Yevan David	24	6	3	2	14	345	2nd	1st
2025	Dallara 324-TOM'S	(South Korea) Michael Shin	24	4	0	7	12	317	3rd	1st
2025	Dallara 324-TOM'S	(Mexico) José Garfias	24	3	0	3	10	276	4th	1st
2025	Dallara 324-TOM'S	(United States) Everett Stack	24	2	0	0	6	226	6th	1st
2025	Dallara 324-TOM'S	(Brazil) Fernando Barrichello	21	1	0	1	6	212	7th	1st
2025	Dallara 324-TOM'S	(Mexico) Diego de la Torre	23	0	0	0	1	153	8th	1st
2025	Dallara 324-TOM'S	(Romania) Luca Viișoreanu‡	6	0	0	0	0	18	18th	1st
2026	Dallara 324-TOM'S	(Chinese Taipei) Enzo Yeh	24	10	2	5	18	421	1st	1st
2026	Dallara 324-TOM'S	(Mexico) Diego de la Torre	24	5	0	6	15	344	2nd	1st
2026	Dallara 324-TOM'S	(Mexico) Jesse Carrasquedo Jr.	24	3	4	5	9	291	3rd	1st
2026	Dallara 324-TOM'S	(United States) Everett Stack	15	2	0	1	8	211	5th	1st
2026	Dallara 324-TOM'S	(Poland) Wiktor Dobrzański	24	0	0	1	5	185	7th	1st
2026	Dallara 324-TOM'S	(Czech Republic) Jan Koller	24	0	0	1	2	97	8th	1st
2026	Dallara 324-TOM'S	(Mexico) Lorenzo Castillo	24	0	0	0	0	89	9th	1st
2026	Dallara 324-TOM'S	(Netherlands) Niels Koolen	6	0	0	0	0	44	13th	1st
2026	Dallara 324-TOM'S	(China) Yuhao Fu	3	0	0	0	0	0	NC	1st

† Mansell drove for Carlin in round 3.

‡ Viișoreanu drove for Nielsen Racing in round 8.

== Former series results ==
=== GP2 Series ===
Year	Car	Drivers	Races	Wins	Poles	F.L.	Points	D.C.	T.C.
2013	Dallara GP2/11-Mecachrome	(United Kingdom) Sam Bird	22	5	2	3	181	2nd	1st
2013	Dallara GP2/11-Mecachrome	(France) Tom Dillmann	22	0	1	2	92	10th	1st

=== Formula 3 Euro Series ===
Year	Car	Drivers	Races	Wins	Poles	F.Laps	Points	D.C.	T.C.
2009	Dallara F308-Mercedes	(Switzerland) Christopher Zanella	20	0	0	0	11	13th	7th
2009	Dallara F308-Mercedes	(Netherlands) Renger van der Zande	8	1	0	0	7	15th	7th
2009	Dallara F308-Mercedes	(Finland) Atte Mustonen	12	0	0	0	4	19th	7th
2010	Dallara F308-Volkswagen	(Portugal) António Félix da Costa	18	3	0	1	40	7th	4th
2010	Dallara F308-Volkswagen	(Denmark) Kevin Magnussen	2	1	0	1	8	12th	4th
2010	Dallara F308-Volkswagen	(United Kingdom) Adrian Quaife-Hobbs	4	0	0	0	7	13th	4th
2010	Dallara F308-Volkswagen	(Finland) Matias Laine	18	0	0	0	3	14th	4th
2010	Dallara F308-Volkswagen	(Switzerland) Christopher Zanella	6	0	0	0	2	15th	4th
2010	Dallara F308-Volkswagen	(Germany) Tobias Hegewald	2	0	0	0	1	16th	4th
2010	Dallara F308-Volkswagen	(Finland) Mika Mäki	6	0	0	0	0	17th	4th
2010	Dallara F308-Volkswagen	(Netherlands) Renger van der Zande [G]	2	0	0	0	0	N/A	4th
2010	Dallara F305-Volkswagen	(Sweden) Jimmy Eriksson [G]	2	0	0	0	0	N/A	4th
2010	Dallara F305-Volkswagen	(Angola) Luís Sá Silva [G]	2	0	0	0	0	N/A	4th
2011	Dallara F308-Volkswagen	(Sweden) Jimmy Eriksson	27	0	0	0	93	9th	4th
2011	Dallara F308-Volkswagen	(Japan) Kimiya Sato	27	1	0	0	86	10th	4th
2011	Dallara F308-Volkswagen	(Canada) Gianmarco Raimondo	27	0	0	0	66	11th†	4th
2011	Dallara F308-Volkswagen	(Poland) Kuba Giermaziak	18	0	0	0	29	12th	4th
2011	Dallara F308-Volkswagen	(France) Tom Dillmann [G]	6	0	0	0	0	N/A†	4th
2011	Dallara F308-Volkswagen	(Russia) Artem Markelov [G]	3	0	0	0	0	N/A	4th

† Shared results with other teams

=== FIA Formula 3 International Trophy ===
Year	Car	Drivers	Races	Wins	Poles	F.Laps	Points	D.C.
2011	Dallara F308-Volkswagen	(Japan) Kimiya Sato	6	0	0	0	7	9th
2011	Dallara F308-Volkswagen	(France) Tom Dillmann [G]	3	0	0	0	0	N/A
2011	Dallara F308-Volkswagen	(Sweden) Jimmy Eriksson [G]	4	0	0	0	0	N/A
2011	Dallara F308-Volkswagen	(Canada) Gianmarco Raimondo [G]	2	0	0	0	0	N/A
2011	Dallara F308-Volkswagen	(Poland) Kuba Giermaziak [G]	2	0	0	0	0	N/A

=== FIA European Formula 3 ===
FIA Formula 3 European Championship
Year	Car	Drivers	Races	Wins	Poles	F.Laps	Podiums	Points	D.C.	T.C.
2015	Dallara F315-Volkswagen	(Germany) Markus Pommer	33	1	0	1	2	116.5	10th	7th
2015	Dallara F315-Volkswagen	(United Kingdom) Sam MacLeod	30	0	0	0	0	2	24th	7th
2015	Dallara F314-Volkswagen	(Malaysia) Nabil Jeffri	33	0	0	0	0	2	26th	7th
2015	Dallara F314-Volkswagen	(India) Mahaveer Raghunathan	27	0	0	0	0	0	39th	7th
2015	Dallara F314-Volkswagen	(Thailand) Tanart Sathienthirakul	3	0	0	0	0	0	40th	7th
2016	Dallara F315-Volkswagen	(Sweden) Joel Eriksson	30	1	0	2	10	252	5th	3rd
2016	Dallara F315-Volkswagen	(Finland) Niko Kari	30	1	0	0	5	129	10th	3rd
2016	Dallara F316-Volkswagen	(Brazil) Sérgio Sette Câmara	30	0	0	1	2	107	11th	3rd
2016	Dallara F314-Volkswagen	(China) Guanyu Zhou	30	0	0	0	2	101	13th	3rd
2017	Dallara F315-Volkswagen	(Sweden) Joel Eriksson	30	3	2	2	14	139	2nd	3rd
2017	Dallara F315-Volkswagen	(Romania) Petru Florescu	6	0	0	0	0	0	23rd	3rd
2017	Dallara F315-Volkswagen	(Estonia) Jüri Vips	3	0	0	0	0	N/A	NC	3rd
2017	Dallara F316-Volkswagen	(Germany) David Beckmann	21	0	0	0	0	45	16th†	3rd
2017	Dallara F314-Volkswagen	(Japan) Marino Sato	30	0	0	0	0	1	17th	3rd
2017	Dallara F317-Volkswagen	(Germany) Keyvan Andres	30	0	0	0	0	0	21st	3rd
2018	Dallara F318-Volkswagen	(United Kingdom) Dan Ticktum	30	4	4	1	8	308	2nd	2nd
2018	Dallara F315-Volkswagen	(Estonia) Jüri Vips	30	4	3	6	7	284	4th	2nd
2018	Dallara F315-Volkswagen	(South Africa) Jonathan Aberdein	30	0	0	1	3	108	12th	2nd
2018	Dallara F316-Volkswagen	(Switzerland) Fabio Scherer	30	0	1	2	1	64	14th	2nd
2018	Dallara F314-Volkswagen	(San Marino) Marino Sato	30	0	0	0	0	31.5	16th	2nd
2018	Dallara F318-Volkswagen	(Spain) Sebastián Fernández	30	0	0	0	0	5	21st	2nd

† Includes points scored for Van Amersfoort Racing

=== Japanese Formula 3 Championship ===
Japanese Formula 3 Championship
Year	Car	Drivers	Races	Wins	Poles	F.Laps	Podiums	Points	D.C.	T.C.
2019	Dallara F314-Volkswagen	(France) Sacha Fenestraz	20	8	5	9	18	162	1st	1st
2019	Dallara F314-Volkswagen	(Japan) 'Dragon'	20	0	0	0	0	0	14th	1st
2019	Dallara F315-Volkswagen	(India) Ameya Vaidyanathan	20	0	0	0	0	0	13th	1st
2019	Dallara F312-Volkswagen	(United Kingdom) Enaam Ahmed	20	2	1	1	8	63	3rd	1st
2019	Dallara F312-Volkswagen	(United Kingdom) Harrison Newey	3	0	0	0	0	5	11th	1st
2019	Dallara F316-Volkswagen	(Japan) Ukyo Sasahara	3	0	0	0	0	3	12th	1st
2019	Dallara F316-Volkswagen	(Japan) Takashi Hata	2	0	0	0	0	0	20th	1st

=== ADAC Formula 4 ===
Year	Car	Drivers	Races	Wins	Poles	Fast laps	Points	D.C.	T.C.
2015	Tatuus F4-T014-Abarth	(Sweden) Joel Eriksson	24	7	3	1	299	2nd	N/A
2015	Tatuus F4-T014-Abarth	(Germany) Jannes Fittje	24	0	0	0	22	18th	N/A
2015	Tatuus F4-T014-Abarth	(Venezuela) Jonathan Cecotto	24	0	0	0	18	20th	N/A
2015	Tatuus F4-T014-Abarth	(Germany) Michael Waldherr	24	0	0	0	83	11th	N/A
2016	Tatuus F4-T014-Abarth	(Germany) Michael Waldherr	18	0	0	0	28	16th	7th
2016	Tatuus F4-T014-Abarth	(Netherlands) Richard Verschoor	6	0	0	0	34	15th	7th
2016	Tatuus F4-T014-Abarth	(South Africa) Jonathan Aberdein	24	0	0	0	49	14th	7th
2016	Tatuus F4-T014-Abarth	(Finland) Simo Laaksonen	24	1	0	0	88	11th	7th
2016	Tatuus F4-T014-Abarth	(Germany) Sophia Flörsch	24	0	0	1	25	19th	7th
2017	Tatuus F4-T014-Abarth	(South Africa) Jonathan Aberdein	21	0	0	1	94	9th	6th
2017	Tatuus F4-T014-Abarth	(Netherlands) Leonard Hoogenboom	21	0	0	0	10	21st	6th
2017	Tatuus F4-T014-Abarth	(United States) David Malukas	18	0	0	0	20	19th	6th
2017	Tatuus F4-T014-Abarth	(Belgium) Charles Weerts	21	0	0	0	3	22nd	6th

=== Formula 4 UAE Championship ===
Year	Car	Drivers	Races	Wins	Poles	Fast laps	Points	D.C.	T.C.
2016–17	Tatuus F4-T014-Abarth	(South Africa) Jonathan Aberdein	18	14	12	11	368	1st	1st (Note: The entries were split into Team Motopark and Team Motopark 2.)
2016–17	Tatuus F4-T014-Abarth	(United States) Logan Sargeant	18	0	0	7	261	2nd	1st
2016–17	Tatuus F4-T014-Abarth	(Belgium) Charles Weerts	11	0	0	0	84	7th	5th (Note: The entries were split into Team Motopark and Team Motopark 2.)
2016–17	Tatuus F4-T014-Abarth	(Venezuela) Sebastián Fernández	7	1	0	0	65	10th	5th
2016–17	Tatuus F4-T014-Abarth	(Netherlands) Leonard Hoogenboom	4	0	0	0	25	13th	5th
2017–18	Tatuus F4-T014-Abarth	(Belgium) Charles Weerts	23	8	3	8	377	1st	1st (Note: Entered as Dragon Motopark F4)
2017–18	Tatuus F4-T014-Abarth	(Germany) Lucas Alecco Roy	23	0	0	0	131	5th	1st
2017–18	Tatuus F4-T014-Abarth	(Belgium) Amaury Cordeel	17	1	0	1	120	8th	1st

=== Super Formula ===
Year	Car	Drivers	Races	Wins	Poles	F.L.	Points	D.C.	T.C.
2019	Dallara SF19-Honda	(Austria) Lucas Auer	7	0	0	1	14	9th	8th
2019	Dallara SF19-Honda	(United Kingdom) Harrison Newey	7	0	0	0	6	15th	8th
2020	Dallara SF19-Honda	(Japan) Nobuharu Matsushita	4	0	0	0	16	15th	9th
2020	Dallara SF19-Honda	(Brazil) Sérgio Sette Câmara	1	0	1	0	3	20th	9th
2020	Dallara SF19-Honda	(France) Charles Milesi	3	0	0	0	0	21st	9th
2020	Dallara SF19-Honda	(Japan) Mitsunori Takaboshi	1	0	0	0	0	26th	9th

=== Super Formula Lights ===
Year	Car	Drivers	Races	Wins	Poles	F.L.	Points	D.C.
2020	Dallara 320-Volkswagen	(Japan) Sena Sakaguchi	17	4	5	2	116	2nd
2020	Dallara 320-Volkswagen	(Japan) Yoshiaki Katayama	5	0	0	0	10	6th
2020	Dallara 320-Volkswagen	(Japan) Mitsunori Takaboshi	3	0	0	0	8	7th
2020	Dallara 320-Volkswagen	(Japan) Mizuki Ishizaka	2	0	0	0	3	11th
2020	Dallara 320-Volkswagen	(Japan) "Dragon"	17	0	0	0	2	12th
2020	Dallara 320-Volkswagen	(Japan) Kiyoto Fujinami	3	0	0	0	2	13th
2020	Dallara 320-Volkswagen	(Japan) Masami Kageyama	2	0	0	0	1	14th
2020	Dallara 320-Volkswagen	(Japan) Sakon Yamamoto	3	0	0	0	0	16th
2020	Dallara 320-Volkswagen	(Japan) Satoshi Motoyama	3	0	0	0	0	17th
2020	Dallara 320-Volkswagen	(Japan) Nobuhiro Imada	9	0	0	0	0	18th
2020	Dallara 320-Volkswagen	(Japan) Motoyoshi Yoshida	8	0	0	0	0	19th
2020	Dallara 320-Volkswagen	(Japan) Takashi Hata	6	0	0	0	0	20th

== Timeline ==
Current series
Euroformula Open Championship	2019–present
International GT Open	2022–present
Le Mans Cup	2024–present
Middle East Trophy	2025–present
GT3 Revival Series	2026–present
Former series
Formula König	1999–2000
Formula Renault 2.0 Germany	2001–2005
Eurocup Formula Renault 2.0	2001–2009
Formula Renault 2.0 Northern European Cup	2006–2009
Formula 3 Euro Series	2009–2011
German Formula Three Championship	2010–2014
Porsche Supercup	2011
British Formula Three Championship	2011, 2014
ADAC Formel Masters	2011–2014
GP2 Series	2013
Porsche Carrera Cup Germany	2013
ADAC Formula 4	2015–2017
FIA Formula 3 European Championship	2015–2018
Formula 4 UAE Championship	2016–2018
Japanese Formula 3 Championship	2019
Super Formula	2019–2020
Super Formula Lights	2020
Asian Le Mans Series	2023–2024
