= Andrea Rosso =

Andrea Rosso may refer to:

- Andrea Rosso (footballer)
- Andrea Rosso (racing driver)
