= Jasin Ferati =

Swiss racing driver

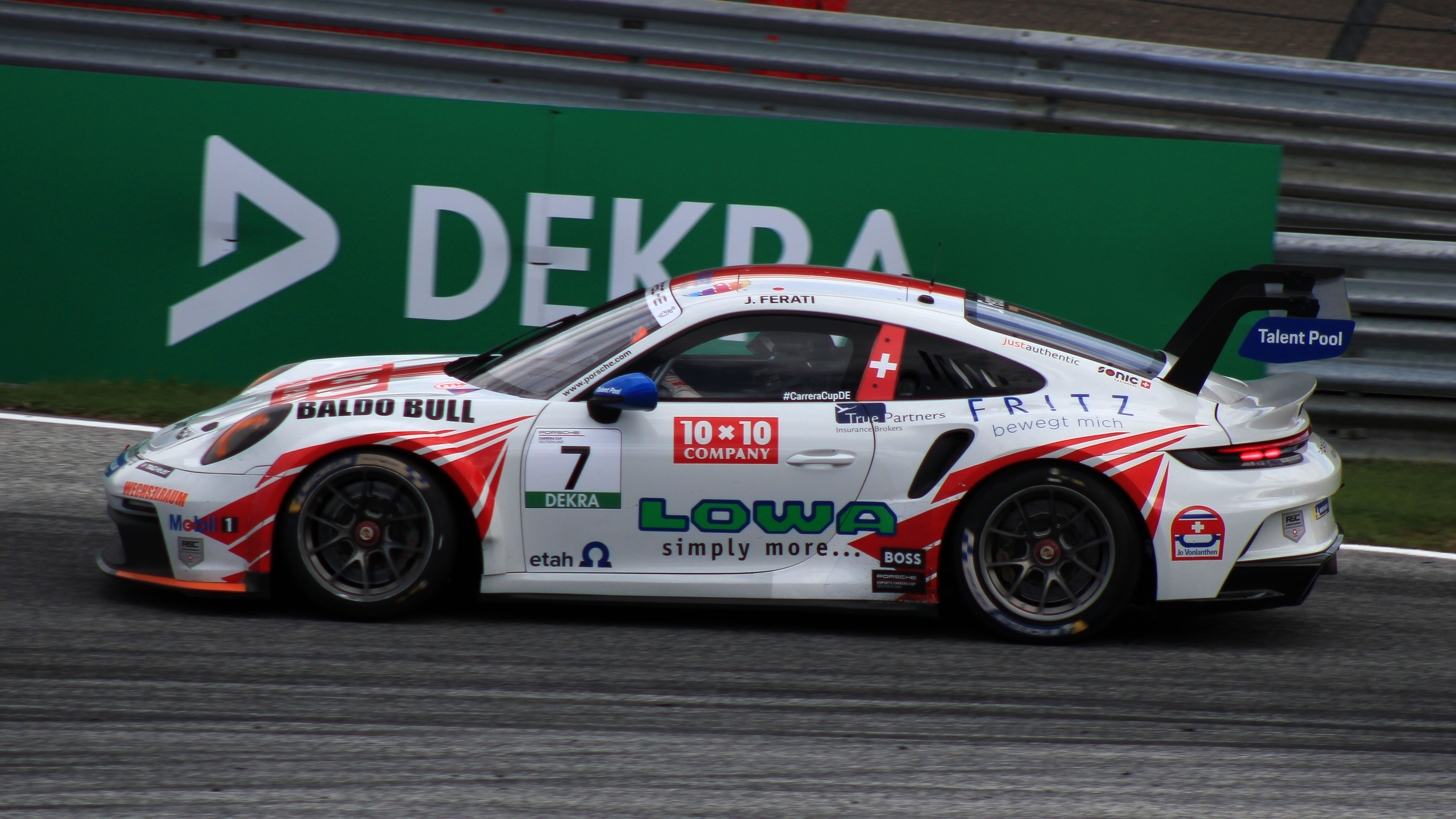
- Ferati at the Red Bull Ring in 2023
- Nationality: (Switzerland) Swiss
- Born: 2 August 2003 (age 23) Winterthur, Switzerland

Italian GT Sprint Championship career
- Debut season: 2024
- Categorisation: FIA Silver
- Former teams: AF Corse
- Starts: 12 (12 entries)
- Wins: 0
- Podiums: 3
- Poles: 0
- Fastest laps: 0
- Best finish: 12th in 2024

Previous series
- 2023 2022 2021 2020: Porsche Carrera Cup Germany; Porsche Sports Cup Suisse; FR European Championship; Italian F4 Championship

Championship titles
- 2022: Porsche Sports Cup Suisse

Jasin Ferati (born 2 August 2003) is a Swiss racing driver with Macedonian Albanian parents from Gostivar. He is the 2022 Porsche Sports Cup Suisse champion, having previously competed in the Formula Regional European Championship.

== Career ==
=== Karting ===
Ferati made his karting debut in the Swiss Karting Championship in 2016, where he finished 13th. He then finished second in the X30 Junior class the following year, losing out to Mike Müller by 131 points. Ferati made his first appearance at the CIK-FIA Karting European Championship, where he finished 43rd with the Schumacher Racing Team. He stayed in karts until 2019, where he also competed in the Karting World Championship.

=== Lower formulae ===
Ferati made his car racing debut in the 2020 Italian F4 Championship with Jenzer Motorsport, driving alongside Filip Ugran. He scored a best finish of eleven twice, in Misano and Imola respectively, and finished the season 29th in the standings, with no points to his name. He was more successful in the Rookies' championship, where he amassed a total of twelve points and finished 19th in the end results.

=== Formula Regional European Championship ===
In February 2021, it was announced that Ferati and Pietro Delli Guanti would be competing for Monolite Racing in the Formula Regional European Championship. In the first round at Imola Ferati finished 22nd in race 1, but spun out into the gravel in the second race. After eight races which included five retirements and a DNQ, he and Monolite decided to part ways during the Zandvoort round. Ferati later signed with KIC Motorsport prior to the following meeting at Spa-Francorchamps.

=== Sportscar racing ===
Ferati made a full-time switch to sportscar racing in 2022, racing in the Porsche Sports Cup Suisse for the Fach Auto Tech team. With six race wins from 12 races, he took the GT3 Cup premier class title, following a season-long battle with series veteran Jürg Aeberhard. The following year, Ferati moved to the Porsche Carrera Cup Germany with Fach Auto Tech. He scored a best finish of ninth at the Lausitzring and placed 17th in the overall standings.

In 2024, Ferati raced in the Italian GT Sprint Championship, partnering Luka Nurmi at AF Corse. He scored two podiums but finished 12th in the drivers' standings after missing the round at Imola. He switched to the Ferrari Challenge Europe in 2025, where he narrowly lost the championship fight to Felix Hirsiger in the final round.

== Karting record ==
=== Karting career summary ===
Season	Series	Team	Position
2016	Rotax Max Wintercup — Rotax Max Junior		11th
2016	Rotax International Open — Junior		13th
2016	BNL International Karting Series — Juniors		13th
2016	Schweizer Kart Meisterschaft — X30 Junior	Spirit Racing	13th
2016	Rotax Max Euro Challenge — Junior		22nd
2017	Rotax Max Wintercup — Rotax Max Junior		10th
2017	IAME International Open — X30 Junior		32nd
2017	Rotax Max Euro Challenge — Junior		8th
2017	Schweizer Kart Meisterschaft — X30 Junior	Spirit Karting	2nd
2017	BNL Golden Trophy — Junior Max		6th
2017	CIK-FIA Karting Academy Trophy	Ferati, Dzevat	20th
2017	IAME International Final — X30 Junior		17th
2018	WSK Champions Cup — OK	KSM Schumacher Racing Team	NC
2018	South Garda Winter Cup — OK	KSM Schumacher Racing Team	19th
2018	WSK Super Master Series — OK	KSM Schumacher Racing Team	50th
2018	German Karting Championship — OK	KSM Schumacher Racing Team	29th
2018	CIK-FIA European Championship — OK	KSM Schumacher Racing Team	43rd
2018	CIK-FIA World Championship — OK	KSM Schumacher Racing Team	75th
2018	WSK Final Cup — OK	KSM Schumacher Racing Team	NC
2019	WSK Champions Cup — OK	Millennium Racing Team	20th
2019	South Garda Winter Cup — OK	Millennium Racing Team	43rd
2019	Swiss Championship — OK	Millennium Racing Team	10th
2019	Deutsche Elektro-Kart-Meisterschaft (DEKM)	Millennium Racing Team	NC
2019	WSK Super Master Series — OK	Millennium Racing Team	28th
2019	Championnat de France — OK	Millennium Racing Team	9th
2019	CIK-FIA European Championship — OK	Millennium Racing Team	40th
2019	CIK-FIA World Championship — OK	Millennium Racing Team	54th
2019	Rotax Max Challenge Grand Finals — Thunder	Millennium Racing Team	1st

== Racing record ==
=== Racing career summary ===
Season	Series	Team	Races	Wins	Poles	F/Laps	Podiums	Points	Position
2020	Italian F4 Championship	Jenzer Motorsport	17	0	0	0	0	0	29th
2020	F4 Spanish Championship	Jenzer Motorsport	3	0	0	0	0	14	19th
2021	Formula Regional European Championship	Monolite Racing	7	0	0	0	0	0	35th
2021	Formula Regional European Championship	KIC Motorsport	6	0	0	0	0	0	35th
2022	Porsche Sports Cup Suisse - GT3 Cup	Fach Auto Tech	12	6	4	8	10	305	**1st**
2023	Porsche Carrera Cup Germany	Fach Auto Tech	16	0	0	0	0	36	17th
2024	Italian GT Sprint Championship - GT3	AF Corse	6	0	0	0	2	26	12th
2026	Italian GT Championship Endurance Cup - GT3	Nova Race Events	4	0	0	0	0	7	19th
2026	Italian GT Championship Sprint Cup - GT3	Nova Race Events	8	0	0	0	1	42	5th

* Season still in progress.

=== Complete Italian F4 Championship results ===
(key) (Races in bold indicate pole position) (Races in italics indicate fastest lap)

Year	Team	1	2	3	4	5	6	7	8	9	10	11	12	13	14	15	16	17	18	19	20	21	Pos	Points
2020	Jenzer Motorsport	MIS; 1; 14	MIS; 2; 11	MIS; 3; 16	IMO1; 1; 11	IMO1; 2; 18	IMO1; 3 Ret	RBR; 1; 16	RBR; 2; 22	RBR; 3; 15	MUG; 1; 15	MUG; 2; 22	MUG; 3; 20	MNZ; 1 WD	MNZ; 2 WD	MNZ; 3 WD	IMO2; 1; 18	IMO2; 2; 12	IMO2; 3; 21	VLL; 1; 18	VLL; 2 C	VLL; 3; 25	29th	0

=== Complete F4 Spanish Championship results ===
(key) (Races in bold indicate pole position) (Races in italics indicate fastest lap)

Year	Team	1	2	3	4	5	6	7	8	9	10	11	12	13	14	15	16	17	18	19	20	21	Pos	Points
2020	Jenzer Motorsport	NAV; 1	NAV; 2	NAV; 3	LEC; 1; 6	LEC; 2; 5	LEC; 3; 13	JER; 1	JER; 2	JER; 3	CRT; 1	CRT; 2	CRT; 3	ARA; 1	ARA; 2	ARA; 3	JAR; 1	JAR; 2	JAR; 3	CAT; 1	CAT; 2	CAT; 3	19th	14

=== Complete Formula Regional European Championship results ===
(key) (Races in bold indicate pole position) (Races in italics indicate fastest lap)

Year	Team	1	2	3	4	5	6	7	8	9	10	11	12	13	14	15	16	17	18	19	20	DC	Points
2021	Monolite Racing	IMO; 1; 22	IMO; 2 Ret	CAT; 1; 19	CAT; 2 Ret	MCO; 1 Ret	MCO; 2 DNQ	LEC; 1; 22	LEC; 2 Ret	ZAN; 1 WD	ZAN; 2 WD											35th	0
2021	KIC Motorsport											SPA; 1 Ret	SPA; 2 Ret	RBR; 1	RBR; 2	VAL; 1; 32	VAL; 2; 31	MUG; 1 Ret	MUG; 2; 30	MNZ; 1	MNZ; 2	35th	0

=== Complete Porsche Sports Cup Suisse results ===
(key) (Races in bold indicate pole position) (Races in italics indicate fastest lap)

Year	Team	1	2	3	4	5	6	7	8	9	10	11	12	DC	Points
2022	Fach Auto Tech	**RBR**; **SP1**; 2	RBR; SP2; 1	LEC; SP; 5	LEC; END; 3	**FRA**; **SP1**; 1	FRA; SP2; 1	DIJ; SP1; 2	DIJ; SP2; 2	**MUG**; **SP1**; 4	MUG; END; 1	**MIS**; **SP1**; 1	MIS; SP2; 1	1st	305

=== Complete Porsche Carrera Cup Germany results ===
(key) (Races in bold indicate pole position) (Races in italics indicate fastest lap)

Year	Team	1	2	3	4	5	6	7	8	9	10	11	12	13	14	15	16	DC	Points
2023	Fach Auto Tech	SPA; 1 DSQ	SPA; 2; 18	HOC; 1; 14	HOC; 2; 17	ZAN; 1; 17	ZAN; 2; 14	NÜR; 1; 13	NÜR; 2; 10	LAU; 1; 9	LAU; 2; 14	SAC; 1 Ret	SAC; 2; 15	RBR; 1; 14	RBR; 2; 12	HOC; 1; 15	HOC; 2; 10	17th	36
