= Lorenzo Patrese =

Italian racing driver and horse rider

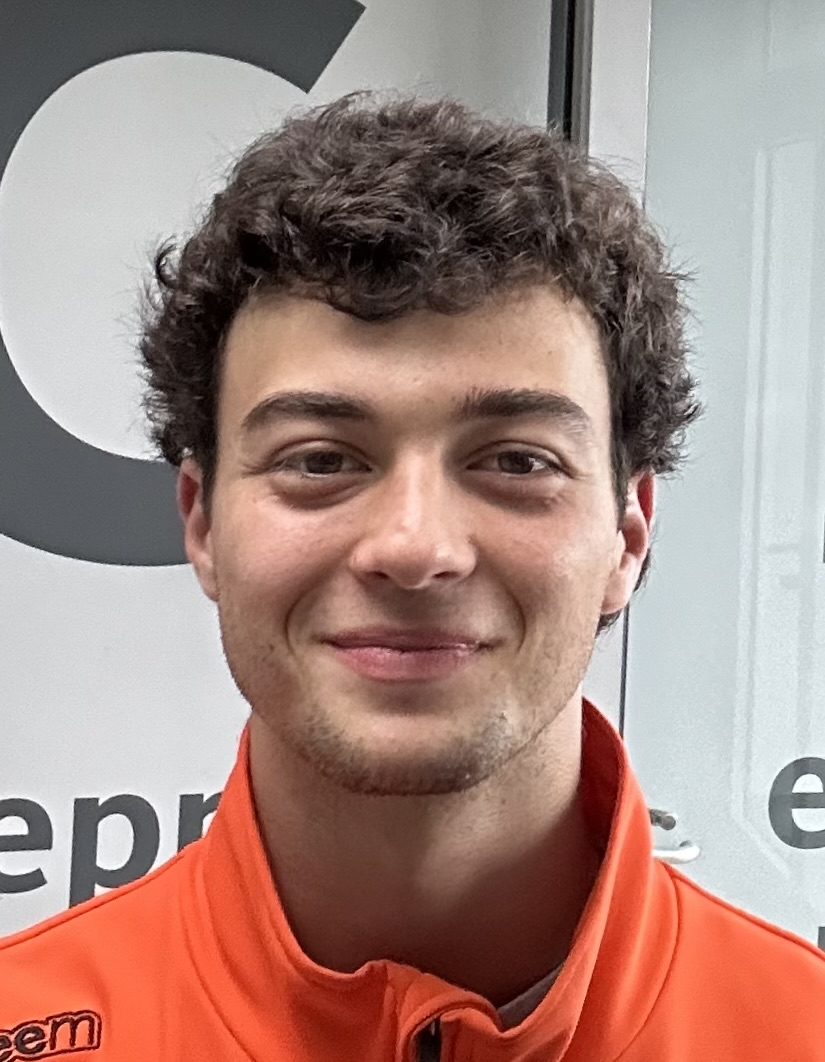
- Patrese in 2024
- Nationality: Italian
- Born: 12 August 2005 (age 21) Padua, Italy
- Relatives: Riccardo Patrese (father)

GT World Challenge Europe Endurance Cup career
- Debut season: 2022
- Current team: Tresor Attempto Racing
- Categorisation: FIA Silver
- Car number: 88

Previous series
- 2020-2021: Italian F4 Championship

Lorenzo Patrese (born 12 August 2005) is an Italian racing driver and horse rider, currently competing in the GT World Challenge Europe with Tresor Attempto Racing. He participated in the 2021 and 2020 Italian F4 Championship.

== Racing career ==
=== Karting ===
Patrese debuted in karts in 2016, when he was eleven, and started making experience in lower karting categories. In 2017, he placed second in the EasyKart Trophy Italy and third in the international final. In 2018, he entered in the X30 Italian Championship obtaining pole positions, podiums and the eighth place in the final championship standing. In 2019, he participated in the Skusa Winter Cup in Florida obtaining a tenth place in the final. He also participated in the CIK-FIA Karting European Championship and the Karting World Championship always qualifying for the final. In 2020, he participated in the European and World championship again, obtaining finals and one group pole position, which put him second overall.

=== Formula 4 ===
In 2020, Patrese debuted in single seaters with AKM Motorsport, taking part in the races of Mugello and Monza of the 2020 Italian F4 Championship.

In 2021, Patrese entered the championship with AKM Motorsport once again. He finished the season as third in the Rookies' championship and 12th in the overall Drivers' championship. In the final round of the season he secured all three overall pole positions.

=== Italian GT Championship ===
Patrese was signed to participate in the first round of the 2022 Italian GT Championship in Pergusa, but the car was retired at the start of qualifying.

=== GT World Challenge Europe ===
==== Endurance Cup ====
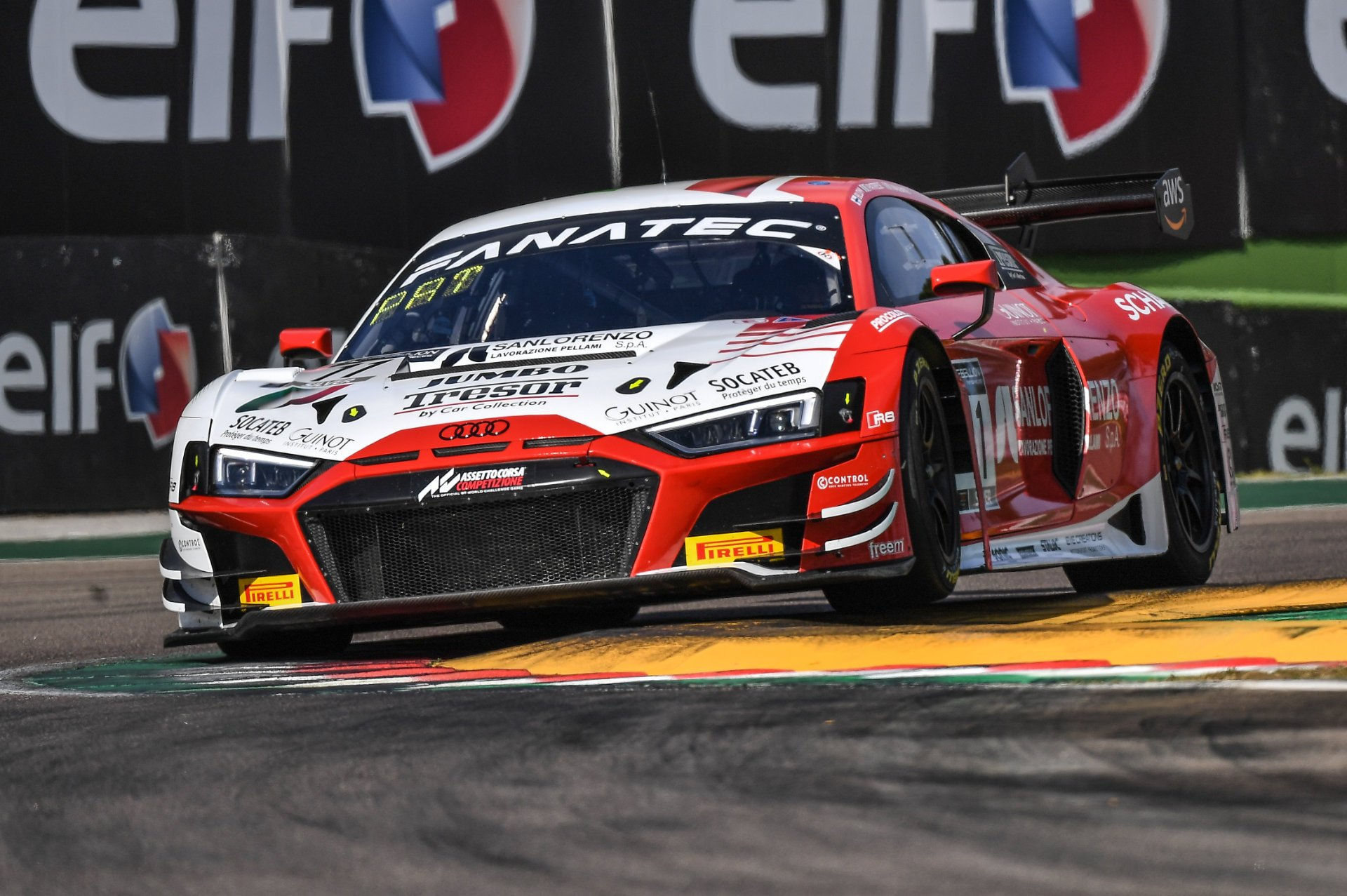
Patrese racing in the 2022 GT World Challenge Europe Endurance Cup at the Imola Circuit.

After a GT winter test in Valencia, Tresor Team Principal entered Patrese in the 2022 GT World Challenge Europe Endurance Cup to participate in the five rounds of the Championship with an Audi R8 LMS. He started the season with a silver Pole Position in Qualifying 1 in Imola, and in the event of Paul Ricard, he completed his first double stint. He became the youngest ever participant at the 24 hours of Spa at the age of sixteen years and eleven months.

In 2023, Patrese joined Tresor Attempto Racing to compete in his second season of the GT World Challenge Europe Endurance Cup with Alex Aka and Pietro Delli Guanti being his teammates.

==== Sprint Cup ====
Patrese was called to substitute Luca Ghiotto in the Misano round of the 2022 GT World Challenge Europe Sprint Cup. He qualified fourth overall in Qualifying 1 and in the race, he was sitting in fifth overall before a technical failure.

In 2023, Patrese competed in his first full season of the GT World Challenge Europe Sprint Cup with Tresor Attempto Racing and Alex Aka as his teammate. The pair would become vice-champions in the Silver Cup.

== Show jumping career ==
In addition to his motorsport career, Patrese has always ridden horses for passion and show jumping was his main profession before starting his motorsport career.

In 2017 and 2018, Patrese went around Europe competing for the Italian junior horse riding National Team, competing in many Nations Cup and winning in Austria.

In 2018, Patrese took part in the European FEI Championship in Fontainebleau, France. He has lead of the FISE computer list for the Children category for one year in 2018.

In 2022, the main events Patrese participated in were test events for the junior category in Gorla and Cattolica, CSIO in Gorla Minore, where he obtained one victory, CSIO in Lamprechtshausen, Austria, the Italian championships in Arezzo, where he placed himself in the top-20 and Regional Cup in Fieracavalli Verona, where he won the individual 130cm category.

== Personal life ==
Patrese currently studies International Business studies at H-Farm College in Venice. He is the son of Formula 1 driver Riccardo Patrese, who raced in Formula One from 1977 to 1993, and Francesca Accordi. Lorenzo speaks fluent Italian, English and Spanish.

== Racing record ==
=== Racing career summary ===
Season	Series	Team	Races	Wins	Poles	F/Laps	Podiums	Points	Position
2020	Italian F4 Championship	AKM Motorsport	5	0	0	0	0	0	39th
2021	Italian F4 Championship	AKM Motorsport	21	0	3	0	0	37	12th
2022	GT World Challenge Europe Endurance Cup - Silver	Tresor by Car Collection	5	0	0	0	0	8	25th
2022	GT World Challenge Europe Sprint Cup	Tresor by Car Collection	2	0	0	0	0	0	NC
2023	GT World Challenge Europe Endurance Cup - Silver	Tresor Attempto Racing	7	2	1	0	4	87	**3rd**
2023	GT World Challenge Europe Sprint Cup - Silver	Tresor Attempto Racing	10	5	2	4	7	118	**2nd**
2024	GT World Challenge Europe Endurance Cup	Tresor Attempto Racing	5	0	0	0	0	0	NC
2024	GT World Challenge Europe Sprint Cup	Tresor Attempto Racing	6	0	0	0	0	16	12th
2024	GT World Challenge Europe Sprint Cup - Gold Cup	Tresor Attempto Racing	6	4	0	1	5	75.5	4th
2024	GT2 European Series - Pro-Am	Attempto Racing							
2025	IMSA SportsCar Championship - GTD	Cetilar Racing	5	0	1	0	0	993	28th
2025	Middle East Trophy - GT3	Tresor Attempto Racing	1	0	0	0	0	0	NC†
2025	GT World Challenge Asia	Winhere Harmony Racing	4	0	0	0	0	0	NC
2025	GT World Challenge Europe Endurance Cup	Ziggo Sport - Tempesta Racing	2	0	0	0	0	0	NC
2026	IMSA SportsCar Championship - GTD	Conquest Racing	9	0	1	2	0	2039	13th
2026	GT World Challenge Europe Endurance Cup	Kessel Racing	4	0	0	1	0	4	30th
2026	24 Hours of Le Mans - LMGT3	Kessel Racing	1	0	0	0	0	N/A	9th
2026	China GT Championship - GT3	FIST Team AAI							

=== Complete Italian F4 Championship results ===
(key) (Races in bold indicate pole position) (Races in italics indicate fastest lap)

Year	Team	1	2	3	4	5	6	7	8	9	10	11	12	13	14	15	16	17	18	19	20	21	Pos	Points
2020	AKM Motorsport	MIS; 1	MIS; 2	MIS; 3	IMO1; 1	IMO1; 2	IMO1; 3	RBR; 1	RBR; 2	RBR; 3	MUG; 1; 16	MUG; 2; 17	MUG; 3 Ret	MNZ; 1 Ret	MNZ; 2; 19	MNZ; 3 DNS	IMO2; 1	IMO2; 2	IMO2; 3	VLL; 1	VLL; 2	VLL; 3	39th	0
2021	AKM Motorsport	LEC; 1 Ret	LEC; 2; 10	LEC; 3; 27	MIS; 1; 11	MIS; 2; 14	MIS; 3; 10	VLL; 1; 11	VLL; 2 Ret	VLL; 3; 22	IMO; 1; 11	IMO; 2; 16	IMO; 3; 7	RBR; 1; 11	RBR; 2; 10	RBR; 3; 6	MUG; 1; 13	MUG; 2; 9	MUG; 3; 26†	**MNZ**; **1**; 27†	**MNZ**; **2**; 7	**MNZ**; **3**; 4	12th	37

=== Complete GT World Challenge Europe results ===
==== GT World Challenge Europe Endurance Cup ====
Year	Team	Car	Class	1	2	3	4	5	6	7	Pos.	Points
2022	Tresor by Car Collection	Audi R8 LMS Evo II	Silver	IMO; 30	LEC; 38	SPA; 6H; 21	SPA; 12H; Ret	SPA; 24H; Ret	HOC; Ret	CAT; 21	25th	8
2023	Tresor Attempto Racing	Audi R8 LMS Evo II	Silver	**MNZ**; Ret	LEC; 15	SPA; 6H; 21	SPA; 12H; 23	SPA; 24H; 47†	NÜR; 18	CAT; 28	3rd	87
2024	Tresor Attempto Racing	Audi R8 LMS Evo II	Gold	LEC; 40	SPA; 6H; 48	SPA; 12H; 46	**SPA**; **24H**; 30	NÜR; 23	MNZ; Ret	JED; Ret	7th	43
2025	Ziggo Sport - Tempesta	Ferrari 296 GT3	Bronze	LEC	MNZ	SPA; 6H; 37	SPA; 12H; 25	SPA; 24H; 50†	NÜR; Ret	CAT	30th	11
2026	Kessel Racing	Ferrari 296 GT3 Evo	Bronze	LEC; 28	MNZ; 8	SPA; 6H	SPA; 12H	SPA; 24H	NÜR; 26	ALG; 33	5th	62

==== GT World Challenge Europe Sprint Cup ====
Year	Team	Car	Class	1	2	3	4	5	6	7	8	9	10	Pos.	Points
2022	Tresor by Car Collection	Audi R8 LMS Evo II	Pro	BRH; 1	BRH; 2	MAG; 1	MAG; 2	ZAN; 1	ZAN; 2	MIS; 1; 11	MIS; 2; 21	VAL; 1	VAL; 2	NC	0
2023	Tresor Attempto Racing	Audi R8 LMS Evo II	Silver	**BRH**; **1**; 10	BRH; 2; 21	MIS; 1; 18	MIS; 2; 12	HOC; 1; 33†	HOC; 2; 13	VAL; 1; 10	VAL; 2; 4	**ZAN**; **1**; 13	ZAN; 2; 25†	2nd	118
2024	Tresor Attempto Racing	Audi R8 LMS Evo II	Gold	BRH; 1	BRH; 2	MIS; 1	MIS; 2	HOC; 1; 11	HOC; 2; 7	MAG; 1; 6	MAG; 2; 4	CAT; 1; 19	CAT; 2; 9	4th	75.5

=== Complete IMSA SportsCar Championship results ===
(key) (Races in bold indicate pole position; races in italics indicate fastest lap)

Year	Entrant	Class	Chassis	Engine	1	2	3	4	5	6	7	8	9	10	Rank	Points
2025	Cetilar Racing	GTD	Ferrari 296 GT3	Ferrari F163CE 3.0 L Turbo V6	DAY; 20	SEB; 19	LBH	LGA	WGL; 7	MOS	ELK	VIR	IMS; 12	**PET**; 10	28th	993
2026	Conquest Racing	GTD	Ferrari 296 GT3 Evo	Ferrari F163CE 3.0 L Turbo V6	DAY; 14	SEB; 7	LBH	**LGA**; 13	WGL; 6	MOS; 4	ELK; 18	VIR; 7	IMS; 11	PET; 13	13th	2039

=== Complete 24 Hours of Le Mans results ===
Year	Team	Co-Drivers	Car	Class	Laps	Pos.	Class Pos.
2026	(Switzerland) Kessel Racing	(United States) Dustin Blattner (Germany) Dennis Marschall	Ferrari 296 GT3 Evo	LMGT3	334	41st	9th
