= 2021 Formula Regional European Championship =

Motor racing competition

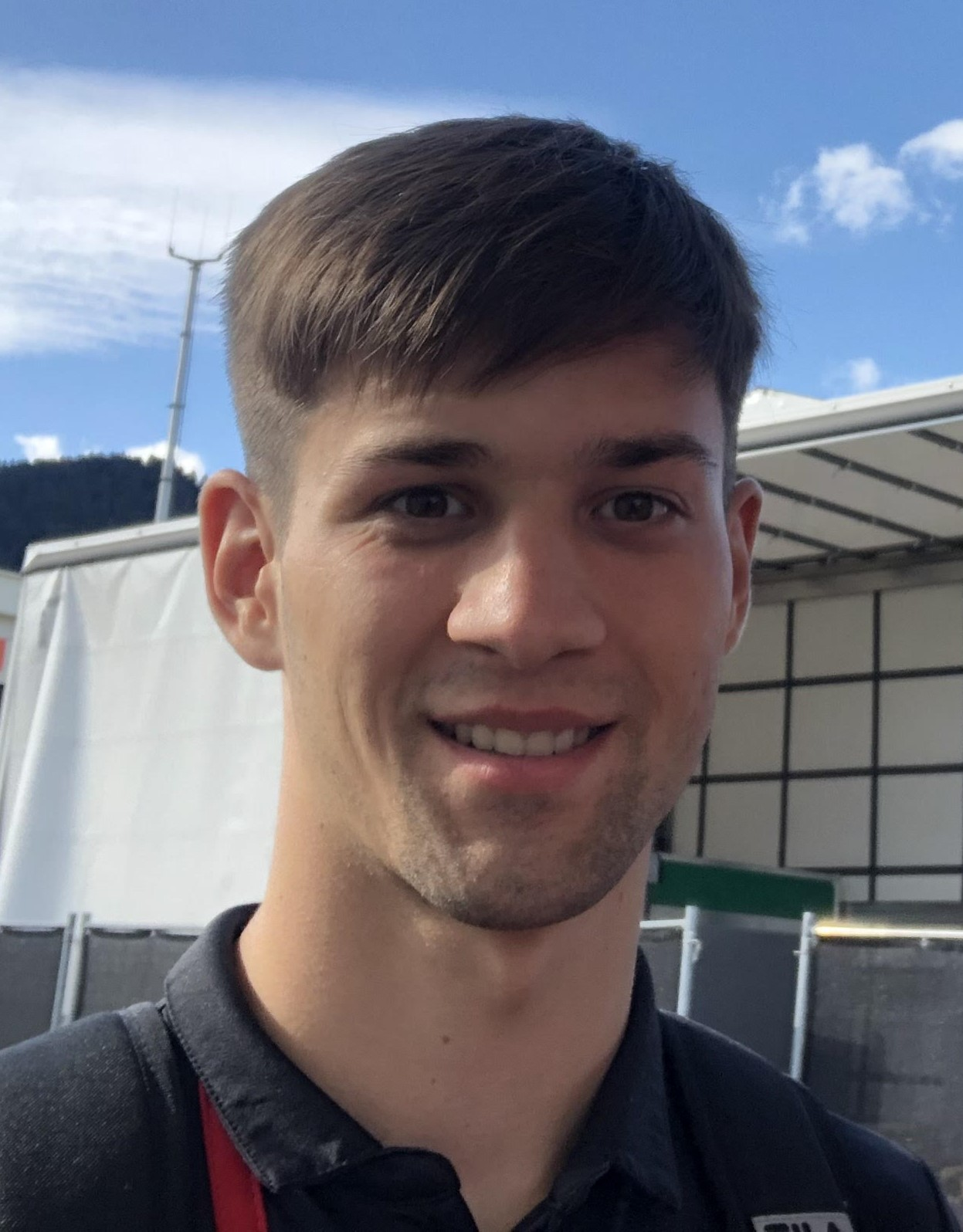
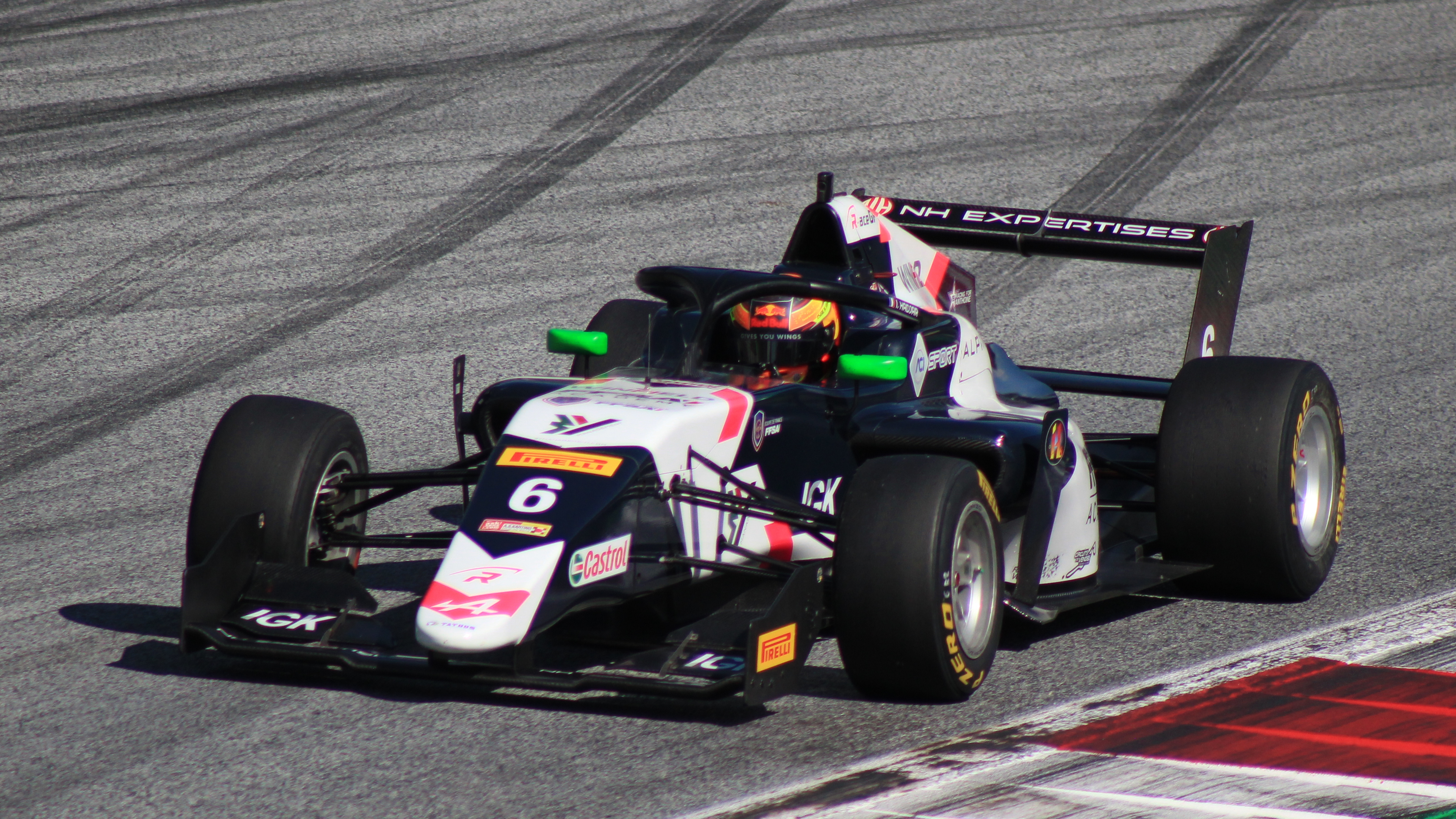
Grégoire Saucy, driving for ART Grand Prix won the Drivers' Championship while Isack Hadjar, driving for R-ace GP, won the Rookie Championship.

The 2021 Formula Regional European Championship by Alpine was a multi-event, Formula 3 open-wheel single seater motor racing championship held across Europe. The championship featured a mix of professional and amateur drivers, competing in Formula 3 cars that conform to the FIA Formula 3 regulations for the championship. This was the third season of the championship and the first after a merger with Formula Renault Eurocup which resulted to the change of the engine supplier to Alpine.

The season commenced on 17 April at Imola Circuit and concluded on 31 October at Autodromo Nazionale di Monza, after ten rounds.

Swiss driver Grégoire Saucy, driving for ART Grand Prix, took the drivers' title in Round 9 at Mugello.

== Teams and drivers ==
Thirteen teams had been pre-selected to the 2021 championship. Teams had a maximum of three cars, but were allowed to run a fourth car if they enter with a female driver. G4 Racing took over Bhaitech's entry and M2 Competition withdrew as only twelve teams are allowed to compete in the series.

Teams	No.	Driver	Status	Rounds
(Italy) Prema Powerteam	1	(Estonia) Paul Aron		All
(Italy) Prema Powerteam	12	(Spain) David Vidales		All
(Italy) Prema Powerteam	17	(Sweden) Dino Beganovic	R	All
(Finland) KIC Motorsport	2	(Germany) Nico Göhler	R	All
(Finland) KIC Motorsport	5	(Finland) Patrik Pasma		1–5
(Finland) KIC Motorsport	11	(Brazil) Gianluca Petecof		7–10
(Finland) KIC Motorsport	13	(Switzerland) Jasin Ferati	R	6, 8–9
(Finland) KIC Motorsport	40	(Finland) Konsta Lappalainen	G	10
(Finland) KIC Motorsport	58	(Finland) Elias Seppänen	R	1–7
(France) ART Grand Prix	5	(Finland) Patrik Pasma		6–10
(France) ART Grand Prix	23	(Netherlands) Thomas ten Brinke	R	1–5
(France) ART Grand Prix	26	(Switzerland) Grégoire Saucy		All
(France) ART Grand Prix	46	(Italy) Gabriele Minì	R	All
(France) R-ace GP	6	(France) Isack Hadjar	R	All
(France) R-ace GP	10	(France) Hadrien David		All
(France) R-ace GP	15	(Switzerland) Léna Bühler	R F	2–10
(France) R-ace GP	22	(Barbados) Zane Maloney		All
(France) R-ace GP	97	(France) Sami Meguetounif	R G	9–10
(Switzerland) G4 Racing	7	(Switzerland) Axel Gnos	R	All
(Switzerland) G4 Racing	9	(New Zealand) Callum Hedge	R G	10
(Switzerland) G4 Racing	30	(Russia) Michael Belov		5–10
(Switzerland) G4 Racing	55	(Italy) Alessandro Famularo (Note: Famularo is a Venezuelan driver who competed under an Italian licence.)	R	2–4
(Switzerland) G4 Racing	72	(Spain) Belén García	R F	1–2, 4, 8
(United Kingdom) Arden Motorsport	8	(Finland) William Alatalo		All
(United Kingdom) Arden Motorsport	14	(Italy) Nicola Marinangeli		All
(United Kingdom) Arden Motorsport	21	(United Kingdom) Alex Quinn		All
(Spain) FA Racing by MP	9	(France) Alexandre Bardinon		1–8
(Spain) FA Racing by MP	25	(France) Alexandre Bardinon		9–10
(Spain) FA Racing by MP	19	(Italy) Andrea Rosso	R	All
(Spain) FA Racing by MP	85	(Brazil) Gabriel Bortoleto	R	All
(Spain) FA Racing by MP	89	(United States) Arias Deukmedjian	R G	9
(Italy) Monolite Racing	13	(Switzerland) Jasin Ferati	R	1–5
(Italy) Monolite Racing	35	(Italy) Pietro Delli Guanti	R	All
(Italy) Monolite Racing	55	(United Kingdom) Dexter Patterson	R	6, 10
(Italy) Monolite Racing	99	(Mexico) José Garfias	R	7–9
(Italy) JD Motorsport	16	(Australia) Tommy Smith		All
(Italy) JD Motorsport	33	(Russia) Michael Belov	G	4
(Italy) JD Motorsport	33	(Israel) Ido Cohen		6–7, 9–10
(Italy) JD Motorsport	91	(Brazil) Eduardo Barrichello	R	All
(Netherlands) MP Motorsport	27	(Netherlands) Kas Haverkort	R	All
(Netherlands) MP Motorsport	43	(Argentina) Franco Colapinto		All
(Netherlands) MP Motorsport	77	(Netherlands) Dilano van 't Hoff	R G	8–10
(Netherlands) MP Motorsport	96	(Monaco) Oliver Goethe (Note: Goethe is a Danish-German driver who competed under a Monégasque licence.)	R	All
(Portugal) DR Formula	41	(Italy) Emidio Pesce		All
(Portugal) DR Formula	71	(Spain) Brad Benavides (Note: Benavides is an American-Spanish-Guatemalan driver who competed under a Spanish licence.)		1–5
(Netherlands) Van Amersfoort Racing	51	(Italy) Francesco Pizzi	R	All
(Netherlands) Van Amersfoort Racing	62	(Spain) Lorenzo Fluxá		All
(Netherlands) Van Amersfoort Racing	64	(Spain) Mari Boya	R	All

Icon	Status
R	Rookie
F	Female
G	Guest drivers ineligible for points

- Casper Stevenson was scheduled to compete for Van Amersfoort Racing, but withdrew prior to the start of the season. His seat was taken by Mari Boya, who was originally set to race for FA Racing by MP. Gabriel Bortoleto, who had initially signed for DR Formula, replaced Boya at FA Racing by MP.

== Race calendar ==
The initial calendar was revealed on 7 December 2020. The series adopted the Formula Renault Eurocup weekend format with qualifying session 1 and race 1 on Saturday and qualifying session 2 and race 2 on Sunday. After rescheduling the season opener at Spa to support the Emilia Romagna Grand Prix, the second Imola round was subsequently dropped and plans to reinclude Spa were announced. A planned round at the Nürburgring was cancelled because of the flood disaster in the region, with a replacement at Circuit Ricardo Tormo added later.

Round		Circuit	Date	Supporting
1	R1	(Italy) Imola Circuit, Imola	17 April	Emilia Romagna Grand Prix
1	R2	(Italy) Imola Circuit, Imola	18 April	Emilia Romagna Grand Prix
2	R1	(Spain) Circuit de Barcelona-Catalunya, Montmeló	8 May	Spanish Grand Prix
2	R2	(Spain) Circuit de Barcelona-Catalunya, Montmeló	9 May	Spanish Grand Prix
3	R1	Circuit de Monaco, Monte Carlo	22 May	Monaco Grand Prix
3	R2	Circuit de Monaco, Monte Carlo	23 May	Monaco Grand Prix
4	R1	(France) Circuit Paul Ricard, Le Castellet	29 May	GT World Challenge Europe Endurance Cup
4	R2	(France) Circuit Paul Ricard, Le Castellet	30 May	GT World Challenge Europe Endurance Cup
5	R1	(Netherlands) Circuit Zandvoort, Zandvoort	19 June	GT World Challenge Europe Sprint Cup
5	R2	(Netherlands) Circuit Zandvoort, Zandvoort	20 June	GT World Challenge Europe Sprint Cup
6	R1	(Belgium) Circuit de Spa-Francorchamps, Stavelot	24 July	SRO Spa Speed Week
6	R2	(Belgium) Circuit de Spa-Francorchamps, Stavelot	25 July	SRO Spa Speed Week
7	R1	(Austria) Red Bull Ring, Spielberg	11 September	International GT Open
7	R2	(Austria) Red Bull Ring, Spielberg	12 September	International GT Open
8	R1	(Spain) Circuit Ricardo Tormo, Valencia	25 September	GT World Challenge Europe Sprint Cup
8	R2	(Spain) Circuit Ricardo Tormo, Valencia	26 September	GT World Challenge Europe Sprint Cup
9	R1	(Italy) Mugello Circuit, Scarperia e San Piero	9 October	Main event
9	R2	(Italy) Mugello Circuit, Scarperia e San Piero	10 October	Main event
10	R1	(Italy) Autodromo Nazionale di Monza, Monza	30 October	Main event
10	R2	(Italy) Autodromo Nazionale di Monza, Monza	31 October	Main event

== Results ==
Round		Circuit	Pole position	Fastest lap	Winning driver	Winning team	Rookie winner
1	R1	(Italy) Imola	(Spain) David Vidales	(France) Hadrien David	(Spain) David Vidales	(Italy) Prema Powerteam	(France) Isack Hadjar
1	R2	(Italy) Imola	(Switzerland) Grégoire Saucy	(Spain) David Vidales	(Switzerland) Grégoire Saucy	(France) ART Grand Prix	(Italy) Gabriele Minì
2	R1	(Spain) Barcelona	(Switzerland) Grégoire Saucy	(Switzerland) Grégoire Saucy	(Switzerland) Grégoire Saucy	(France) ART Grand Prix	(Italy) Gabriele Minì
2	R2	(Spain) Barcelona	(Switzerland) Grégoire Saucy	(France) Isack Hadjar	(Switzerland) Grégoire Saucy	(France) ART Grand Prix	(France) Isack Hadjar
3	R1	Monaco	(France) Isack Hadjar	(France) Isack Hadjar	(France) Isack Hadjar	(France) R-ace GP	(France) Isack Hadjar
3	R2	Monaco	(Barbados) Zane Maloney	(Barbados) Zane Maloney	(Barbados) Zane Maloney	(France) R-ace GP	(France) Isack Hadjar
4	R1	(France) Paul Ricard	(Switzerland) Grégoire Saucy	(France) Hadrien David	(France) Hadrien David	(France) R-ace GP	(Italy) Gabriele Minì
4	R2	(France) Paul Ricard	(Switzerland) Grégoire Saucy	(Russia) Michael Belov	(Switzerland) Grégoire Saucy	(France) ART Grand Prix	(France) Isack Hadjar
5	R1	(Netherlands) Zandvoort	(Switzerland) Grégoire Saucy	(Switzerland) Grégoire Saucy	(Switzerland) Grégoire Saucy	(France) ART Grand Prix	(Italy) Gabriele Minì
5	R2	(Netherlands) Zandvoort	(Switzerland) Grégoire Saucy	(Argentina) Franco Colapinto	(Switzerland) Grégoire Saucy	(France) ART Grand Prix	(Italy) Gabriele Minì
6	R1	(Belgium) Spa-Francorchamps	(Russia) Michael Belov	(Russia) Michael Belov	(Russia) Michael Belov	(Switzerland) G4 Racing	(Sweden) Dino Beganovic
6	R2	(Belgium) Spa-Francorchamps	(Switzerland) Grégoire Saucy	(Russia) Michael Belov	(Switzerland) Grégoire Saucy	(France) ART Grand Prix	(Italy) Gabriele Minì
7	R1	(Austria) Red Bull Ring	(Argentina) Franco Colapinto	(Argentina) Franco Colapinto	(Argentina) Franco Colapinto	(Netherlands) MP Motorsport	(Brazil) Gabriel Bortoleto
7	R2	(Austria) Red Bull Ring	(Argentina) Franco Colapinto	(Argentina) Franco Colapinto	(Switzerland) Grégoire Saucy	(France) ART Grand Prix	(Brazil) Gabriel Bortoleto
8	R1	(Spain) Valencia	(Argentina) Franco Colapinto	(Argentina) Franco Colapinto	(Argentina) Franco Colapinto	(Netherlands) MP Motorsport	(Spain) Mari Boya
8	R2	(Spain) Valencia	(Russia) Michael Belov	(Sweden) Dino Beganovic	(Russia) Michael Belov	(Switzerland) G4 Racing	(France) Isack Hadjar
9	R1	(Italy) Mugello	(Estonia) Paul Aron	(Russia) Michael Belov	(Estonia) Paul Aron	(Italy) Prema Powerteam	(Brazil) Gabriel Bortoleto
9	R2	(Italy) Mugello	(Estonia) Paul Aron	(Estonia) Paul Aron	(Estonia) Paul Aron	(Italy) Prema Powerteam	(Sweden) Dino Beganovic
10	R1	(Italy) Monza	(France) Hadrien David	(France) Isack Hadjar	(France) Hadrien David	(France) R-ace GP	(France) Isack Hadjar
10	R2	(Italy) Monza	(Sweden) Dino Beganovic	(Sweden) Dino Beganovic	(France) Isack Hadjar	(France) R-ace GP	(France) Isack Hadjar

== Championship standings ==
Points system

Points were awarded to the top 10 classified finishers.

Position	**1st**	**2nd**	**3rd**	**4th**	**5th**	**6th**	**7th**	**8th**	**9th**	**10th**
Points	25	18	15	12	10	8	6	4	2	1

=== Drivers' standings ===
Pos.	Driver	IMO (Italy)		CAT (Spain)		MCO (Monaco)		LEC (France)		ZAN (Netherlands)		SPA (Belgium)		RBR (Austria)		VAL (Spain)		MUG (Italy)		MNZ (Italy)		Points
Pos.	Driver	R1	R2	R1	R2	R1	R2	R1	R2	R1	R2	R1	R2	R1	R2	R1	R2	R1	R2	R1	R2	Points
1	(Switzerland) Grégoire Saucy	5	**1**	**1**	**1**	22	Ret	**DSQ**	**1**	**1**	**1**	8	**1**	5	1	12	3	5	3	4	10	277
2	(France) Hadrien David	3	4	12	Ret	4	3	1	10	3	12	2	3	2	Ret	7	6	23	6	**1**	3	209
3	(Estonia) Paul Aron	4	2	3	4	3	Ret	14	26	4	7	18	8	3	13	4	12	**1**	**1**	6	2	197
4	(Barbados) Zane Maloney	Ret	3	9	9	2	**1**	4	6	15	8	3	2	9	3	8	8	11	14	3	7	170
5	(France) Isack Hadjar	7	12	7	3	**1**	2	21	4	6	11	7	9	12	6	9	4	12	13	2	1	166
6	(Argentina) Franco Colapinto	WD	WD	28†	Ret	WD	WD	12	12	5	2	Ret	6	**1**	**4**	**1**	2	Ret	5	7	6	140
7	(Italy) Gabriele Minì	11	6	2	5	10	10	3	Ret	2	3	6	4	11	12	14	10	9	Ret	Ret	5	122
8	(Russia) Michael Belov (Note: Belov was ineligible to score points at Le Castellet as he competed as a guest driver.)							2	2	9	DNS	**1**	5	6	Ret	5	**1**	2	4	9	8	116
9	(United Kingdom) Alex Quinn	2	Ret	4	2	6	4	6	21	10	Ret	10	Ret	4	8	6	15	14	11	13	11	104
10	(Spain) David Vidales	**1**	7	Ret	Ret	7	6	11	8	11	14	Ret	25	13	7	2	5	3	15	10	Ret	102
11	(Finland) William Alatalo	6	5	6	7	8	14	9	3	12	4	9	10	8	15	13	13	4	16	14	9	91
12	(Finland) Patrik Pasma	13	16	10	8	5	5	5	7	Ret	22	5	11	17	10	33	22	16	18	16	Ret	56
13	(Sweden) Dino Beganovic	8	19	15	10	17	Ret	10	11	8	17	4	14	14	11	10	Ret	Ret	2	5	**Ret**	53
14	(Spain) Mari Boya	10	8	5	19	9	8	Ret	31	7	9	11	13	10	14	3	7	Ret	12	Ret	12	51
15	(Brazil) Gabriel Bortoleto	9	11	23	22	23	21	18	28	17	18	28	12	7	2	11	9	6	8	8	28	44
16	(Netherlands) Kas Haverkort	Ret	25	Ret	17	14	11	7	15	18	6	14	18	29	Ret	15	14	10	7	11	4	35
17	(Netherlands) Thomas ten Brinke	WD	WD	8	6	16	7	8	9	19	21											28
18	(Italy) Pietro Delli Guanti	16	Ret	11	13	11	13	17	13	Ret	24	15	Ret	15	5	16	19	7	9	18	22	18
19	(Italy) Andrea Rosso	12	20	13	11	13	9	13	5	DNS	16	17	21	18	29	26	17	17	Ret	Ret	26	14
20	(Italy) Francesco Pizzi	18	17	21	15	15	12	20	32†	13	5	13	16	22	9	18	16	18	17	12	16	12
21	(United Kingdom) Dexter Patterson											19	7							WD	WD	6
22	(Brazil) Gianluca Petecof													Ret	28	22	11	8	10	21	14	5
23	(Monaco) Oliver Goethe	14	9	17	16	18	17	16	16	14	10	24	17	16	18	23	29	15	29	26	27	3
24	(Finland) Elias Seppänen	15	10	18	Ret	12	15	15	14	16	13	16	19	23	17							1
25	(Spain) Lorenzo Fluxá	19	13	14	20	DNS	Ret	Ret	19	20	15	12	20	19	16	19	23	19	24	23	19	0
26	(Spain) Brad Benavides	Ret	14	16	12	24	Ret	28	20	21	20											0
27	(Israel) Ido Cohen											21	15	25	19			13	Ret	25	Ret	0
28	(Switzerland) Axel Gnos	17	15	20	14	19	DNQ	Ret	25	28	25	20	23	27	24	27	20	26	19	29	21	0
29	(Brazil) Eduardo Barrichello	20	23	DNS	23	NC	16	19	29	23	19	25	22	24	25	17	26	21	22	31	17	0
30	(Italy) Nicola Marinangeli	Ret	18	Ret	21	Ret	Ret	25	Ret	27	28	26	Ret	20	21	31	18	30	28	17	Ret	0
31	(Australia) Tommy Smith	Ret	21	22	25	DNQ	Ret	23	17	Ret	29	22	Ret	Ret	27	21	21	24	27	28	18	0
32	(Italy) Alessandro Famularo			Ret	18	21	DNQ	Ret	18													0
33	(France) Alexandre Bardinon	24	Ret	26	26	DNQ	18	26	23	26	27	Ret	Ret	30†	Ret	Ret	28	28	31	20	29	0
34	(Germany) Nico Göhler	21	Ret	24	28	DNQ	19	27	27	22	26	23	24	26	22	28	24	Ret	26	19	24	0
35	(Switzerland) Jasin Ferati	22	Ret	19	Ret	Ret	DNQ	22	Ret	WD	WD	Ret	Ret			32	31	Ret	30			0
36	(Mexico) José Garfias													28	20	24	Ret	20	23			0
37	(Italy) Emidio Pesce	NC	24	Ret	24	DNQ	20	24	22	25	23	Ret	26	21	23	25	30	Ret	25	27	25	0
38	(Switzerland) Léna Bühler			25	27	20	DNQ	29	30	24	30	27	27	Ret	26	30	25	29	32	30	23	0
39	(Spain) Belén García	23	22	27	29			30	24							29	27					0
Guest drivers ineligible to score points
—	(France) Sami Meguetounif																	22	20	15	13	—
—	(Netherlands) Dilano van 't Hoff															20	Ret	25	21	24	15	—
—	(New Zealand) Callum Hedge																			22	20	—
—	(United States) Arias Deukmedjian																	27	33			—
—	(Finland) Konsta Lappalainen																			Ret	30	—
Pos.	Driver	R1	R2	R1	R2	R1	R2	R1	R2	R1	R2	R1	R2	R1	R2	R1	R2	R1	R2	R1	R2	Points
Pos.	Driver	IMO (Italy)		CAT (Spain)		MCO (Monaco)		LEC (France)		ZAN (Netherlands)		SPA (Belgium)		RBR (Austria)		VAL (Spain)		MUG (Italy)		MNZ (Italy)		Points

Colour	Result
Gold	Winner
Silver	Second place
Bronze	Third place
Green	Points classification
Blue	Non-points classification
Blue	Non-classified finish (NC)
Purple	Retired, not classified (Ret)
Red	Did not qualify (DNQ)
Red	Did not pre-qualify (DNPQ)
Black	Disqualified (DSQ)
White	Did not start (DNS)
White	Withdrew (WD)
White	Race cancelled (C)
Blank	Did not practice (DNP)
Blank	Did not arrive (DNA)
Blank	Excluded (EX)

**Bold** – Pole
Italics – Fastest Lap
† — Did not finish, but classified

Rookie

=== Teams' standings ===
For teams entering more than two cars only the two best-finishing cars were eligible to score points in the teams' championship.

Pos.	Team	IMO (Italy)		CAT (Spain)		MCO (Monaco)		LEC (France)		ZAN (Netherlands)		SPA (Belgium)		RBR (Austria)		VAL (Spain)		MUG (Italy)		MNZ (Italy)		Points
Pos.	Team	R1	R2	R1	R2	R1	R2	R1	R2	R1	R2	R1	R2	R1	R2	R1	R2	R1	R2	R1	R2	Points
1	(France) R-ace GP	3	3	7	3	1	1	1	4	3	8	2	2	2	3	7	4	11	6	1	1	481
1	(France) R-ace GP	7	4	9	9	2	2	4	6	6	11	3	3	9	6	8	6	12	13	2	3	481
2	(France) ART Grand Prix	5	1	1	1	10	7	3	1	1	1	5	1	5	1	12	3	5	3	4	5	422
2	(France) ART Grand Prix	11	6	2	5	16	10	8	9	2	3	6	4	11	10	14	10	9	18	16	10	422
3	(Italy) Prema Powerteam	1	2	3	4	3	6	10	8	4	7	4	8	3	7	2	5	1	1	5	2	346
3	(Italy) Prema Powerteam	4	7	15	10	7	Ret	11	11	8	14	18	14	13	11	4	12	3	2	6	Ret	346
4	(United Kingdom) Arden Motorsport	2	5	4	2	6	4	6	3	6	4	9	10	4	8	6	13	4	11	13	9	195
4	(United Kingdom) Arden Motorsport	6	18	6	7	8	14	9	21	12	28	10	Ret	8	15	13	15	14	16	14	11	195
5	(Netherlands) MP Motorsport	14	9	17	16	14	11	7	12	5	2	14	6	1	4	1	2	10	5	7	4	177
5	(Netherlands) MP Motorsport	Ret	25	28†	17	18	17	12	15	14	6	24	17	16	18	15	14	15	7	11	6	177
6	(Switzerland) G4 Racing	17	15	20	14	19	DNQ	30	18	9	25	1	5	6	24	5	1	2	4	9	8	116
6	(Switzerland) G4 Racing	23	22	27	18	21	DNQ	Ret	24	28	DNS	20	23	27	Ret	27	20	26	19	22	20	116
7	(Netherlands) Van Amersfoort Racing	10	8	5	15	9	8	20	19	7	5	11	13	10	9	3	7	18	12	12	12	63
7	(Netherlands) Van Amersfoort Racing	18	13	14	19	15	12	Ret	31	13	9	12	16	19	14	18	16	19	17	23	16	63
8	(Spain) FA Racing by MP	9	11	13	11	13	9	13	5	17	16	17	12	7	2	11	9	6	8	8	26	58
8	(Spain) FA Racing by MP	12	20	23	22	23	18	18	23	26	18	28	21	18	29	26	17	17	31	20	28	58
9	(Finland) KIC Motorsport	13	10	10	8	5	5	5	7	16	13	16	19	23	17	22	11	8	10	19	14	51
9	(Finland) KIC Motorsport	15	16	18	28	12	15	15	14	22	22	23	24	26	22	28	24	Ret	26	21	24	51
10	(Italy) Monolite Racing	16	Ret	11	13	11	13	17	13	Ret	24	15	7	15	5	16	19	7	9	18	22	24
10	(Italy) Monolite Racing	22	Ret	19	Ret	Ret	DNQ	22	Ret	WD	WD	19	Ret	28	20	24	Ret	20	23	WD	WD	24
11	(Italy) JD Motorsport	20	21	22	23	NC	16	19	17	23	19	21	15	24	19	17	21	13	22	25	17	0
11	(Italy) JD Motorsport	Ret	23	DNS	25	DNQ	Ret	23	29	Ret	29	22	22	25	25	21	26	21	27	28	18	0
12	(Portugal) DR Formula	NC	14	16	12	24	20	24	20	21	20	26	26	21	23	25	30	Ret	25	27	25	0
12	(Portugal) DR Formula	Ret	24	Ret	24	DNQ	Ret	28	22	25	23											0
Pos.	Team	R1	R2	R1	R2	R1	R2	R1	R2	R1	R2	R1	R2	R1	R2	R1	R2	R1	R2	R1	R2	Points
Pos.	Team	IMO (Italy)		CAT (Spain)		MCO (Monaco)		LEC (France)		ZAN (Netherlands)		SPA (Belgium)		RBR (Austria)		VAL (Spain)		MUG (Italy)		MNZ (Italy)		Points
