= 2020 Italian F4 Championship =

Annual racing competition

The 2020 Italian F4 Championship Powered by Abarth was the seventh season of the Italian F4 Championship. Gabriele Minì won the drivers' championship in his rookie season while his team Prema Powerteam won the teams' championship for the fifth time.

== Teams and drivers ==
Team	No.	Driver	Class	Rounds
(France) R-ace GP	3	(Russia) Kirill Smal	R	3
(France) R-ace GP	4	(France) Victor Bernier		3
(Italy) Prema Powerteam	3	(Russia) Kirill Smal	R	4, 6–7
(Italy) Prema Powerteam	6	(Colombia) Sebastian Montoya	R	All
(Italy) Prema Powerteam	7	(Sweden) Dino Beganovic	R	All
(Italy) Prema Powerteam	46	(Italy) Gabriele Minì	R	All
(Italy) Prema Powerteam	85	(Brazil) Gabriel Bortoleto	R	All
(San Marino) AKM Motorsport	8	(China) Cenyu Han	R	1
(San Marino) AKM Motorsport	9	(Italy) Lorenzo Patrese	R	4–5
(San Marino) AKM Motorsport	31	(United Kingdom) Taylor Barnard	R	4–5, 7
(San Marino) AKM Motorsport	32	(Spain) Lorenzo Fluxá	R	5
(Netherlands) Van Amersfoort Racing	8	(China) Cenyu Han	R	2–7
(Netherlands) Van Amersfoort Racing	17	(United Kingdom) Jonny Edgar		2–4, 6–7
(Netherlands) Van Amersfoort Racing	51	(Italy) Francesco Pizzi	R	All
(Netherlands) Van Amersfoort Racing	52	(United States) Jak Crawford		2–4, 6–7
(Netherlands) Van Amersfoort Racing	86	(Hungary) Bence Válint	R	2–7
(Italy) Bhaitech	11	(United Kingdom) Dexter Patterson	R	All
(Italy) Bhaitech	19	(Denmark) Sebastian Øgaard	R	All
(Italy) Bhaitech	20	(Russia) Tikhon Kharitonov	R	6–7
(Italy) Bhaitech	48	(Finland) Jesse Salmenautio		All
(Italy) Bhaitech	66	(Czech Republic) Zdeněk Chovanec	R	1–5
(Switzerland) Jenzer Motorsport	13	(Switzerland) Jasin Ferati	R	All (Note: Jasin Ferati appeared on the entry list for Round 5 but did not participate in the races after injuring himself during qualifying.)
(Switzerland) Jenzer Motorsport	14	(Romania) Filip Ugran		All (Note: Filip Ugran appeared on the entry list for Round 3 but could not make it to the track to compete due to travel restrictions.)
(Switzerland) Jenzer Motorsport	15	(Poland) Piotr Wiśnicki	R	1–5
(Switzerland) Jenzer Motorsport	28	(Italy) Francesco Braschi	R	4–7
(Switzerland) Jenzer Motorsport	68	(Mexico) Santiago Ramos	R	4–7
(Switzerland) Jenzer Motorsport	84	(Italy) Francesco Simonazzi	R	2–3
(Switzerland) G4 Racing	21	(Switzerland) Axel Gnos		All
(Slovenia) AS Motorsport	27	(Germany) Sebastian Freymuth		1–6
(Germany) BWT Mücke Motorsport	29	(Germany) Joshua Dürksen (Note: Dürksen is a Paraguayan driver who entered under German racing license.)		3, 6–7
(Germany) BWT Mücke Motorsport	71	(Czech Republic) Josef Knopp	R	3
(Germany) BWT Mücke Motorsport	86	(Hungary) Bence Válint	R	1
(Germany) BWT Mücke Motorsport	97	(Colombia) Diego Contecha		6–7
(Italy) BVM Racing	35	(Italy) Pietro Delli Guanti	R	1–6
(Italy) BVM Racing	36	(Italy) Pietro Armanni	R	6–7
(Italy) BVM Racing	84	(Italy) Francesco Simonazzi	R	4–7
(Portugal) DR Formula RP Motorsport	57	(Portugal) Pedro Perino		7
(Germany) US Racing	70	(Germany) Tim Tramnitz	R	7
(Germany) US Racing	87	(United Kingdom) Oliver Bearman	R	3, 6–7
(Germany) US Racing	95	(Russia) Vladislav Lomko	R	3, 6
(Italy) Iron Lynx	72	(Italy) Leonardo Fornaroli	R	All
(Italy) Iron Lynx	73	(Russia) Yaroslav Shevyrtalov	R	6–7
(Italy) Cram Motorsport	75	(Colombia) Nicolás Baptiste	R	6–7
(Italy) Cram Motorsport	76	(Italy) Vittorio Catino	R	4, 6–7
(Italy) Cram Motorsport	77	(Italy) Andrea Rosso	R	All
(Italy) Cram Motorsport	78	(Poland) Mateusz Kaprzyk	R	1–4, 6 (Note: Mateusz Kaprzyk appeared on the entry list for Round 4 but did not participate in qualifying or the races after testing positive for COVID-19.)
(Italy) Cram Motorsport	79	(Greece) Georgis Markogiannis	R	3, 5
(Italy) DRZ Benelli	84	(Italy) Francesco Simonazzi	R	1
(United Arab Emirates) Abu Dhabi Racing	88	(United Arab Emirates) Hamda Al Qubaisi	R W	All

Icon	Legend
R	Rookie
W	Woman Trophy

== Race calendar and results ==
The calendar was revealed on 16 September 2019. Following a delayed start to the season due to the 2019-20 coronavirus pandemic, a new calendar was announced on 19 May 2020. On 3 June 2020 it was announced that the season opener at Hungaroring was pushed back 2 weeks. The final calendar was released on 11 June 2020, with Hungaroring no longer on the schedule.

Round		Circuit	Date	Pole position	Fastest lap	Winning driver	Winning team	Secondary Class winner
1	R1	(Italy) Misano World Circuit	1 August	(Italy) Gabriele Minì	(Italy) Francesco Pizzi	(Italy) Gabriele Minì	(Italy) Prema Powerteam	R: (Italy) Gabriele Minì; W: no finishers
1	R2	(Italy) Misano World Circuit	2 August	(Italy) Gabriele Minì	(Romania) Filip Ugran	(Italy) Andrea Rosso	(Italy) Cram Motorsport	R: (Italy) Andrea Rosso; W: (United Arab Emirates) Hamda Al Qubaisi
1	R3	(Italy) Misano World Circuit	2 August	(Italy) Gabriele Minì	(Romania) Filip Ugran	(Italy) Francesco Pizzi	(Netherlands) Van Amersfoort Racing	R: (Italy) Francesco Pizzi; W: (United Arab Emirates) Hamda Al Qubaisi
2	R1	(Italy) Autodromo Enzo e Dino Ferrari	29 August	(Sweden) Dino Beganovic	(United Kingdom) Jonny Edgar	(Romania) Filip Ugran	(Switzerland) Jenzer Motorsport	R: (Sweden) Dino Beganovic; W: (United Arab Emirates) Hamda Al Qubaisi
2	R2	(Italy) Autodromo Enzo e Dino Ferrari	30 August	(United Kingdom) Jonny Edgar	(United Kingdom) Jonny Edgar	(United Kingdom) Jonny Edgar	(Netherlands) Van Amersfoort Racing	R: (Italy) Andrea Rosso; W: (United Arab Emirates) Hamda Al Qubaisi
2	R3	(Italy) Autodromo Enzo e Dino Ferrari	30 August	(United States) Jak Crawford	(Italy) Francesco Pizzi	(Italy) Andrea Rosso	(Italy) Cram Motorsport	R: (Italy) Andrea Rosso; W: (United Arab Emirates) Hamda Al Qubaisi
3	R1	(Austria) Red Bull Ring, Spielberg	12 September	(Germany) Joshua Dürksen	(Germany) Joshua Dürksen	(Germany) Joshua Dürksen	(Germany) BWT Mücke Motorsport	R: (Italy) Gabriele Minì; W: (United Arab Emirates) Hamda Al Qubaisi
3	R2	(Austria) Red Bull Ring, Spielberg	13 September	(Italy) Gabriele Minì	(Sweden) Dino Beganovic	(United States) Jak Crawford	(Netherlands) Van Amersfoort Racing	R: (United Kingdom) Oliver Bearman; W: (United Arab Emirates) Hamda Al Qubaisi
3	R3	(Austria) Red Bull Ring, Spielberg	13 September	(Italy) Gabriele Minì	(Germany) Joshua Dürksen	(Italy) Gabriele Minì	(Italy) Prema Powerteam	R: (Italy) Gabriele Minì; W: no finishers
4	R1	(Italy) Mugello Circuit	3 October	(Italy) Andrea Rosso	(Brazil) Gabriel Bortoleto	(Italy) Andrea Rosso	(Italy) Cram Motorsport	R: (Italy) Andrea Rosso; W: (United Arab Emirates) Hamda Al Qubaisi
4	R2	(Italy) Mugello Circuit	4 October	(Brazil) Gabriel Bortoleto	(Italy) Andrea Rosso	(Brazil) Gabriel Bortoleto	(Italy) Prema Powerteam	R: (Brazil) Gabriel Bortoleto; W: (United Arab Emirates) Hamda Al Qubaisi
4	R3	(Italy) Mugello Circuit	4 October	(Brazil) Gabriel Bortoleto	(Italy) Gabriele Minì	(Italy) Gabriele Minì	(Italy) Prema Powerteam	R: (Italy) Gabriele Minì; W: (United Arab Emirates) Hamda Al Qubaisi
5	R1	(Italy) Autodromo Nazionale di Monza	17 October	(Italy) Francesco Pizzi	(Colombia) Sebastián Montoya	(Italy) Francesco Pizzi (Note: Gabriele Minì crossed the line first but was given a 5 second penalty for leaving the track and gaining a lasting advantage. Pizzi inherited the win.)	(Netherlands) Van Amersfoort Racing	R: (Italy) Francesco Pizzi; W: no finishers
5	R2	(Italy) Autodromo Nazionale di Monza	18 October	(Italy) Andrea Rosso (Note: Rosso did not start the race, leaving pole position to Gabriele Minì.)	(Italy) Leonardo Fornaroli	(Italy) Francesco Pizzi	(Netherlands) Van Amersfoort Racing	R: (Italy) Francesco Pizzi; W: no finishers
5	R3	(Italy) Autodromo Nazionale di Monza	18 October	(Italy) Gabriele Minì	(Sweden) Dino Beganovic	(Italy) Pietro Delli Guanti	(Italy) BVM Racing	R: (Italy) Pietro Delli Guanti; W: (United Arab Emirates) Hamda Al Qubaisi
6	R1	(Italy) Autodromo Enzo e Dino Ferrari	21 November	(Italy) Gabriele Minì	(Sweden) Dino Beganovic	(Italy) Gabriele Minì	(Italy) Prema Powerteam	R: (Italy) Gabriele Minì; W: (United Arab Emirates) Hamda Al Qubaisi
6	R2	(Italy) Autodromo Enzo e Dino Ferrari	22 November	(Sweden) Dino Beganovic	(Sweden) Dino Beganovic	(Sweden) Dino Beganovic	(Italy) Prema Powerteam	R: (Sweden) Dino Beganovic; W: no finishers
6	R3	(Italy) Autodromo Enzo e Dino Ferrari	22 November	(Italy) Gabriele Minì	(Italy) Gabriele Minì	(United States) Jak Crawford	(Netherlands) Van Amersfoort Racing	R: (Italy) Gabriele Minì; W: (United Arab Emirates) Hamda Al Qubaisi
7	R1	(Italy) Vallelunga Circuit	5 December	(Italy) Gabriele Minì	(United Kingdom) Oliver Bearman	(United Kingdom) Oliver Bearman	(Germany) US Racing	R: (United Kingdom) Oliver Bearman; W: (United Arab Emirates) Hamda Al Qubaisi
7	R2	(Italy) Vallelunga Circuit	6 December	(Brazil) Gabriel Bortoleto	Cancelled due to heavy rain			
7	R3	(Italy) Vallelunga Circuit	6 December	(Brazil) Gabriel Bortoleto	(United Kingdom) Jonny Edgar	(United Kingdom) Jonny Edgar	(Netherlands) Van Amersfoort Racing	R: (Russia) Kirill Smal; W: (United Arab Emirates) Hamda Al Qubaisi

== Championship standings ==
Points were awarded to the top 10 classified finishers in each race. No points were awarded for pole position or fastest lap. The final classifications for the drivers' and rookies' standings were obtained by summing up the scores on the 16 best results obtained during the races held.

Position	**1st**	**2nd**	**3rd**	**4th**	**5th**	**6th**	**7th**	**8th**	**9th**	**10th**
Points	25	18	15	12	10	8	6	4	2	1

=== Drivers' championship ===
Pos	Driver	MIS (Italy)			IMO1 (Italy)			RBR (Austria)			MUG (Italy)			MNZ (Italy)			IMO2 (Italy)			VLL (Italy)			Pts
Pos	Driver	R1	R2	R3	R1	R2	R3	R1	R2	R3	R1	R2	R3	R1	R2	R3	R1	R2	R3	R1	R2	R3	Pts
1	(Italy) Gabriele Minì	**1**	**4**	**2**	7	5	4	2	**3**	**1**	4	2	1	10	2	**Ret**	**1**	2	**2**	**7**	C	3	284
2	(Italy) Francesco Pizzi	2	3	1	6	10	2	6	8	6	9	Ret	5	**1**	1	4	9	25†	5	2	C	Ret	208
3	(Sweden) Dino Beganovic	5	19	3	**4**	4	12	11	5	8	6	3	2	17	15	7	2	**1**	3	5	C	10	179
4	(United Kingdom) Jonny Edgar				2	**1**	3	3	4	4	Ret	5	26				5	11	4	3	C	1	169
5	(Brazil) Gabriel Bortoleto	7	7	11	8	7	Ret	7	7	13	2	**1**	**3**	18†	3	2	Ret	8	8	4	**C**	**4**	157
6	(United States) Jak Crawford				3	2	**Ret**	4	1	3	24	11	18				3	3	1	Ret	C	5	150
7	(Italy) Andrea Rosso	12	1	8	10	3	1	Ret	9	18	**1**	4	4	2	**DNS**	Ret	11	19	14	10	C	20	140
8	(Romania) Filip Ugran	3	2	4	1	6	Ret	DNA	DNA	DNA	3	6	11	3	Ret	8	12	7	10	14	C	7	133
9	(Italy) Leonardo Fornaroli	4	15	9	17	17	5	13	26	10	5	12	14	4	4	3	4	5	6	8	C	16	108
10	(United Kingdom) Oliver Bearman							5	2	5							7	6	12	1	C	6	85
11	(Colombia) Sebastián Montoya	8	5	5	Ret	14	7	9	28	7	Ret	10	7	5	8	6	6	26†	7	25	C	13	81
12	(Italy) Pietro Delli Guanti	6	6	7	12	9	8	12	6	25†	Ret	9	12	22†	Ret	1	30†	20	16				63
13	(Germany) Joshua Dürksen							**1**	15	2							10	4	11	9	C	9	60
14	(Finland) Jesse Salmenautio	9	9	6	Ret	8	6	8	11	26†	17	20	8	20†	7	10	28	10	19	13	C	14	40
15	(Russia) Kirill Smal							18	25	DNS	7	13	17				8	Ret	9	11	C	2	30
16	(Mexico) Santiago Ramos										10	14	10	9	5	5	13	9	13	22	C	11	26
17	(Czech Republic) Zdeněk Chovanec	Ret	14	13	5	19	Ret	Ret	27	24†	18	27	6	14	Ret	13							18
18	(Italy) Francesco Simonazzi	11	12	Ret	13	16	Ret	17	21	9	12	7	9	11	14	21	16	23	15	6	C	15	18
19	(Poland) Piotr Wiśnicki	Ret	16	19	19	15	17	Ret	12	23†	20	16	19	8	6	22†							12
20	(Denmark) Sebastian Øgaard	Ret	10	21†	15	12	15	14	13	14	8	19	15	7	10	15	Ret	Ret	Ret	20	C	23	12
21	(Hungary) Bence Válint	17	20	18	18	23	Ret	20	24	22	22	26	25	6	12	18	21	Ret	20	29	C	18	8
22	(United Kingdom) Dexter Patterson	10	8	10	9	Ret	13	Ret	16	16	19	21	22	12	18	11	14	Ret	23	Ret	C	21	8
23	(Switzerland) Axel Gnos	13	13	12	Ret	13	9	Ret	17	11	25	8	13	Ret	DNS	Ret	Ret	Ret	24	21	C	12	6
24	(Germany) Tim Tramnitz																			12	C	8	4
25	(United Arab Emirates) Hamda Al Qubaisi	Ret	18	14	14	22	11	10	19	DNS	23	25	23	Ret	Ret	9	29†	Ret	22	24	C	27	3
26	(United Kingdom) Taylor Barnard										11	15	24	21†	9	17				17	C	29	2
27	(Poland) Mateusz Kaprzyk	15	17	15	Ret	11	10	Ret	20	20	WD	WD	WD				17	24	30†				1
28	(France) Victor Bernier							Ret	10	21													1
29	(Switzerland) Jasin Ferati	14	11	16	11	18	Ret	16	22	15	15	22	20	WD	WD	WD	18	12	21	18	C	25	0
30	(Germany) Sebastian Freymuth	18	Ret	20	Ret	20	16	Ret	18	Ret	13	18	21	15	11	20	24	16	25				0
31	(Spain) Lorenzo Fluxá													19†	13	12							0
32	(Czech Republic) Josef Knopp							15	14	12													0
33	(China) Cenyu Han	16	Ret	17	16	21	14	21	23	17	Ret	24	Ret	13	Ret	16	19	Ret	18	15	C	19	0
34	(Russia) Vladislav Lomko							Ret	DNS	DNS							15	13	17				0
35	(Italy) Francesco Braschi										14	Ret	16	DNS	16	14	31†	Ret	NC	16	C	32	0
36	(Russia) Yaroslav Shevyrtalov																22	14	Ret	19	C	17	0
37	(Colombia) Nicolás Baptiste																27	15	31	Ret	C	26	0
38	(Greece) Georgis Markogiannis							19	Ret	19				16	17	19							0
39	(Italy) Lorenzo Patrese										16	17	Ret	Ret	19	DNS							0
40	(Italy) Pietro Armanni																25	17	29	27	C	30	0
41	(Colombia) Diego Contecha																26	18	28	26	C	22	0
42	(Italy) Vittorio Catino										21	23	Ret				20	22	26	Ret	C	28	0
43	(Russia) Tikhon Kharitonov																23	21	27	23	C	24	0
44	(Portugal) Pedro Perino																			28	C	31	0
Pos	Driver	R1	R2	R3	R1	R2	R3	R1	R2	R3	R1	R2	R3	R1	R2	R3	R1	R2	R3	R1	R2	R3	Pts
Pos	Driver	MIS (Italy)			IMO1 (Italy)			RBR (Austria)			MUG (Italy)			MNZ (Italy)			IMO2 (Italy)			VLL (Italy)			Pts

Colour	Result
Gold	Winner
Silver	Second place
Bronze	Third place
Green	Points classification
Blue	Non-points classification
Blue	Non-classified finish (NC)
Purple	Retired, not classified (Ret)
Red	Did not qualify (DNQ)
Red	Did not pre-qualify (DNPQ)
Black	Disqualified (DSQ)
White	Did not start (DNS)
White	Withdrew (WD)
White	Race cancelled (C)
Blank	Did not practice (DNP)
Blank	Did not arrive (DNA)
Blank	Excluded (EX)

**Bold** – Pole
Italics – Fastest Lap
† — Did not finish, but classified

=== Secondary Classes' standings ===
Pos	Driver	MIS (Italy)			IMO1 (Italy)			RBR (Austria)			MUG (Italy)			MNZ (Italy)			IMO2 (Italy)			VLL (Italy)			Pts
Pos	Driver	R1	R2	R3	R1	R2	R3	R1	R2	R3	R1	R2	R3	R1	R2	R3	R1	R2	R3	R1	R2	R3	Pts
Rookies' championship
1	(Italy) Gabriele Minì	1	3	2	4	3	3	1	2	1	3	2	1	9	2	Ret	1	2	1	6	C	2	318
2	(Italy) Francesco Pizzi	2	2	1	3	6	2	3	6	3	8	Ret	5	1	1	4	7	18†	3	2	C	Ret	251
3	(Sweden) Dino Beganovic	4	16	3	1	2	9	7	3	5	5	3	2	15	13	7	2	1	2	4	C	6	231
4	(Brazil) Gabriel Bortoleto	6	6	9	5	4	Ret	4	5	9	2	1	3	16†	3	2	Ret	5	6	3	C	3	199
5	(Italy) Andrea Rosso	10	1	6	7	1	1	Ret	7	14	1	4	4	2	DNS	Ret	8	12	10	8	C	14	172
6	(Italy) Leonardo Fornaroli	3	12	7	14	12	4	9	19	7	4	8	11	3	4	3	3	3	4	7	C	10	148
7	(Colombia) Sebastián Montoya	7	4	4	Ret	9	5	5	21	4	Ret	7	7	4	7	6	4	19†	5	20	C	8	128
8	(United Kingdom) Oliver Bearman							2	1	2							5	4	8	1	C	4	124
9	(Italy) Pietro Delli Guanti	5	5	5	9	5	6	8	4	20†	Ret	6	10	19†	Ret	1	23†	13	12				100
10	(Russia) Kirill Smal							14	18	DNS	6	9	14				6	Ret	7	9	C	1	51
11	(Mexico) Santiago Ramos										9	10	9	8	5	5	9	6	9	18	C	7	47
12	(Italy) Francesco Simonazzi	9	10	Ret	10	11	Ret	13	14	6	11	5	8	10	12	18	12	16	11	5	C	9	39
13	(Denmark) Sebastian Øgaard	Ret	8	17†	12	8	12	10	9	10	7	14	12	6	9	13	Ret	Ret	Ret	16	C	16	28
14	(Czech Republic) Zdeněk Chovanec	Ret	11	10	2	14	Ret	Ret	20	19†	15	21	6	13	Ret	11							27
15	(United Kingdom) Dexter Patterson	8	7	8	6	Ret	10	Ret	11	12	16	15	17	11	16	9	10	Ret	18	Ret	C	15	26
16	(Poland) Piotr Wiśnicki	Ret	13	16	16	10	13	Ret	8	18†	17	12	15	7	6	19							19
17	(United Arab Emirates) Hamda Al Qubaisi	Ret	15	11	11	16	8	6	12	DNS	20	19	18	Ret	Ret	8	22†	Ret	17	19	C	20	16
18	(Poland) Mateusz Kaprzyk	12	14	12	Ret	7	7	Ret	13	16	WD	WD	WD				13	17	22†				12
19	(Switzerland) Jasin Ferati	11	9	13	8	13	Ret	12	15	11	13	16	16	WD	WD	WD	14	7	16	14	C	18	12
20	(Hungary) Bence Válint	14	17	15	15	17	Ret	16	17	17†	19	20	20	5	10	16	17	Ret	15	22	C	12	11
21	(Germany) Tim Tramnitz																			10	C	5	11
22	(United Kingdom) Taylor Barnard										10	11	19	18†	8	15				13	C	22	5
23	(Czech Republic) Josef Knopp							11	10	8													5
24	(Russia) Vladislav Lomko							Ret	DNS	DNS							11	8	13				4
25	(Russia) Yaroslav Shevyrtalov																18	9	Ret	15	C	11	2
26	(Spain) Lorenzo Fluxá													17†	11	10							1
27	(Colombia) Nicolás Baptiste																21	10	23	Ret	C	19	1
28	(China) Cenyu Han	13	Ret	14	13	15	11	17	16	13	Ret	18	Ret	12	Ret	14	15	Ret	14	11	C	13	0
29	(Italy) Pietro Armanni																20	11	21	21	C	23	0
30	(Italy) Francesco Braschi										12	Ret	13	DNS	14	12	24†	Ret	NC	12	C	24	0
31	(Italy) Lorenzo Patrese										14	13	Ret	Ret	17	DNS							0
32	(Greece) Georgis Markogiannis							15	Ret	15				14	15	17							0
33	(Russia) Tikhon Kharitonov																19	14	20	18	C	17	0
34	(Italy) Vittorio Catino										18	17	Ret				16	15	19	Ret	C	21	0
Women's championship
1	(United Arab Emirates) Hamda Al Qubaisi	Ret	1	1	1	1	1	1	1	DNS	1	1	1	Ret	Ret	1	1†	Ret	1	1	C	1	375
Pos	Driver	R1	R2	R3	R1	R2	R3	R1	R2	R3	R1	R2	R3	R1	R2	R3	R1	R2	R3	R1	R2	R3	Pts
Pos	Driver	MIS (Italy)			IMO1 (Italy)			RBR (Austria)			MUG (Italy)			MNZ (Italy)			IMO2 (Italy)			VLL (Italy)			Pts

Colour	Result
Gold	Winner
Silver	Second place
Bronze	Third place
Green	Points classification
Blue	Non-points classification
Blue	Non-classified finish (NC)
Purple	Retired, not classified (Ret)
Red	Did not qualify (DNQ)
Red	Did not pre-qualify (DNPQ)
Black	Disqualified (DSQ)
White	Did not start (DNS)
White	Withdrew (WD)
White	Race cancelled (C)
Blank	Did not practice (DNP)
Blank	Did not arrive (DNA)
Blank	Excluded (EX)

† — Did not finish, but classified

=== Teams' championship ===
Each team acquired the points earned by their two best drivers in each race.

Pos	Team	Points
1	(Italy) Prema Powerteam	596
2	(Netherlands) Van Amersfoort Racing	495
3	(Switzerland) Jenzer Motorsport	168
4	(Italy) Cram Motorsport	141
5	(Italy) Iron Lynx	108
6	(Germany) US Racing	89
7	(Italy) BVM Racing	80
8	(Italy) Bhaitech	77
9	(Germany) BWT Mücke Motorsport	59
10	(Switzerland) G4 Racing	6
11	(United Arab Emirates) Abu Dhabi Racing	3
12	(San Marino) AKM Motorsport	2
13	(France) R-ace GP	1
14	(Italy) DRZ Benelli	0
15	(Slovenia) AS Motorsport	0
16	(Portugal) DR Formula RP Motorsport	0
