= Lorenzo Fluxá =

Spanish racing driver (born 2004)

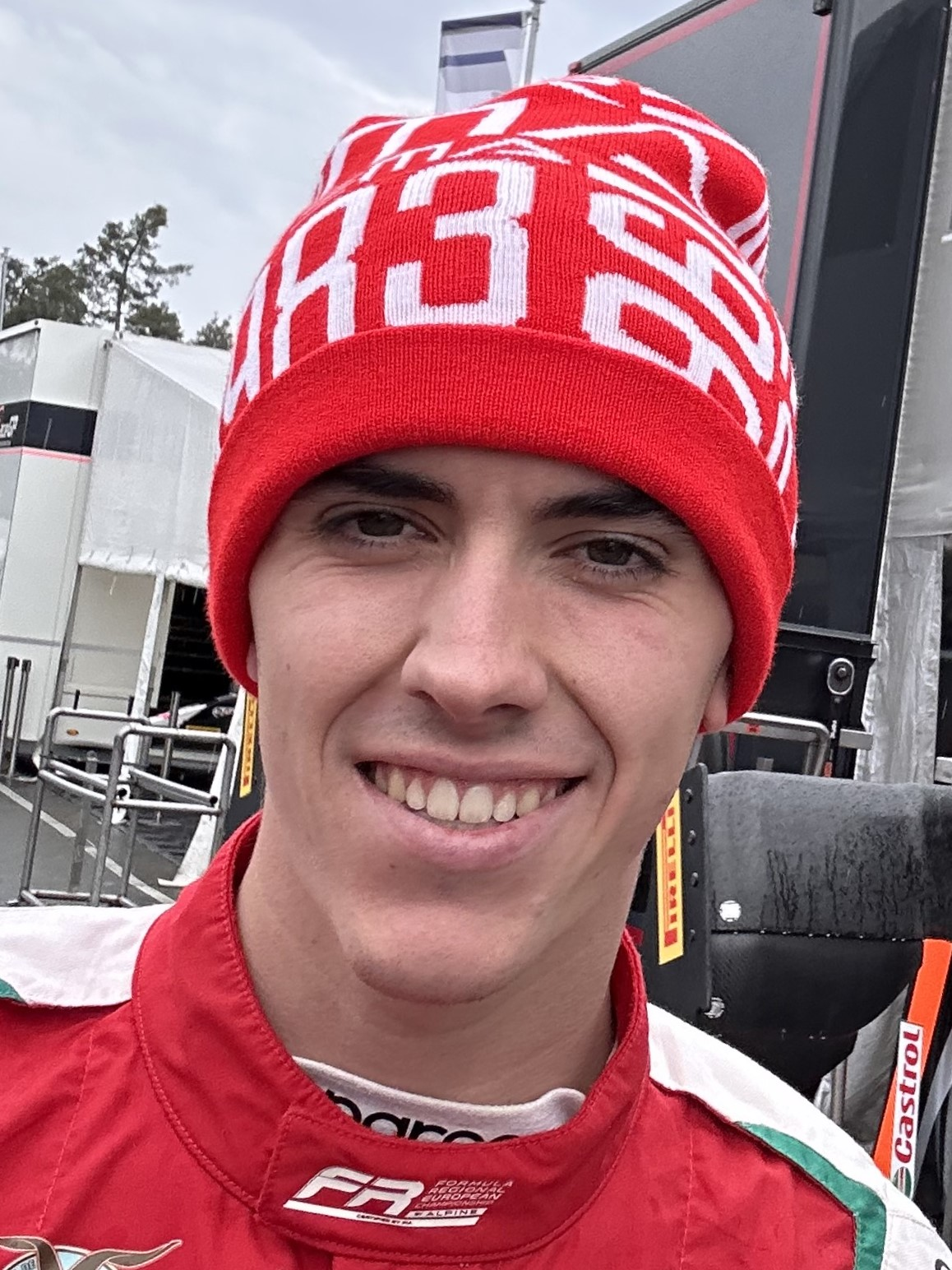
- Fluxá in 2023
- Nationality: (Spain) Spanish
- Born: Lorenzo James Fluxá Cross; 23 November 2004 (age 21) Palma de Mallorca, Balearic Islands, Spain
- Relatives: Lucas Fluxá (brother); Luna Fluxá (sister); Miquel Fluxà Rosselló (great uncle)

European Le Mans Series career
- Debut season: 2024
- Current team: Algarve Pro Racing
- Categorisation: FIA Silver (until 2024); FIA Gold (2025–)
- Car number: 25
- Former teams: Cool Racing
- Starts: 9
- Wins: 2
- Podiums: 3
- Poles: 1
- Fastest laps: 0
- Best finish: 3rd in 2024 (LMP2)

Previous series
- 2023; 2021–2023; 2022; 2021; 2020; 2020; 2020: FR Middle East; FR European; FR Asian; F3 Asian; Italian F4; F4 Spanish; F4 UAE

Lorenzo James Fluxá Cross (Spanish pronunciation: [loˈɾenso ˈxames fluˈksa ˈkros]; born 23 November 2004), otherwise known as Lorenzo Fluxá Jr., is a Spanish and British racing driver who competes in the European Le Mans Series for Algarve Pro Racing.

Fluxá previously drove for Cool Racing in the 2024 European Le Mans Series.

== Early career ==
=== Karting ===
Having won the Balearic Karting Championship in 2016, Fluxá moved into the national championship as well as international competitions during the same year. Following a full season spent driving in the Mini and Cadet categories, where he managed to finish fourth overall in his homeland, Fluxá would move into OK Junior in 2018, competing in the European Championship for Lennox and qualifying for the final in the World Championship. He ended his karting career in 2019, having competed in the OK Senior class - missing several events due to an injury.

=== Lower formulae ===
Fluxá made his car racing debut in the Formula 4 UAE Championship in 2020 with Xcel Motorsport. He won two races and finished on the podium eleven times throughout the campaign, being beaten only by teammate Francesco Pizzi, who won the title with 300 points to Fluxá's 274.

That year, Fluxá also competed in the F4 Spanish Championship with GRS. He achieved sixth place in the drivers' standings, helping his team to finish fourth in the teams' championship with 99 points compared to the total of 26 scored by his three teammates.

=== F3 Asian Championship ===
Fluxá raced in the 2021 F3 Asian Championship for BlackArts Racing. He scored 25 points and finished 14th in the standings, three positions ahead of teammate Rafael Villagómez, but also five places behind his other full-time teammate Cem Bölükbaşı.

=== Formula Regional European Championship ===
==== 2021 ====
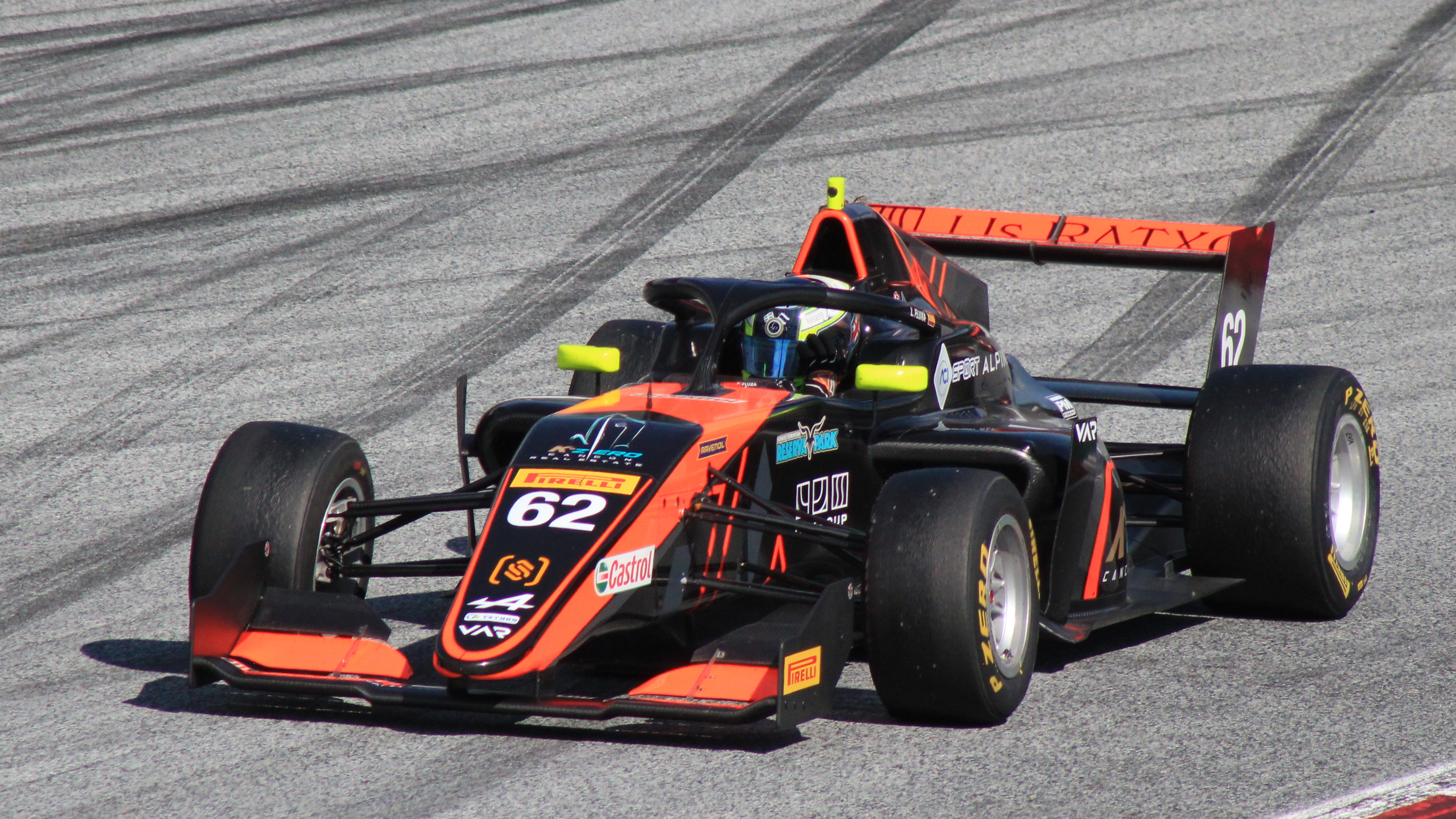
Fluxá racing in the 2021 Formula Regional European Championship at the Red Bull Ring.

In February 2021, it was announced that Fluxá would be making his debut in the Formula Regional European Championship with Van Amersfoort Racing, partnering F4 UAE title rival Francesco Pizzi and Mari Boya. His best race finish would end up being a twelfth place at a rain-affected race in Belgium, as the Spaniard finished 25th in the championship, being the only Van Amersfoort driver to not score any points.

==== 2022 ====
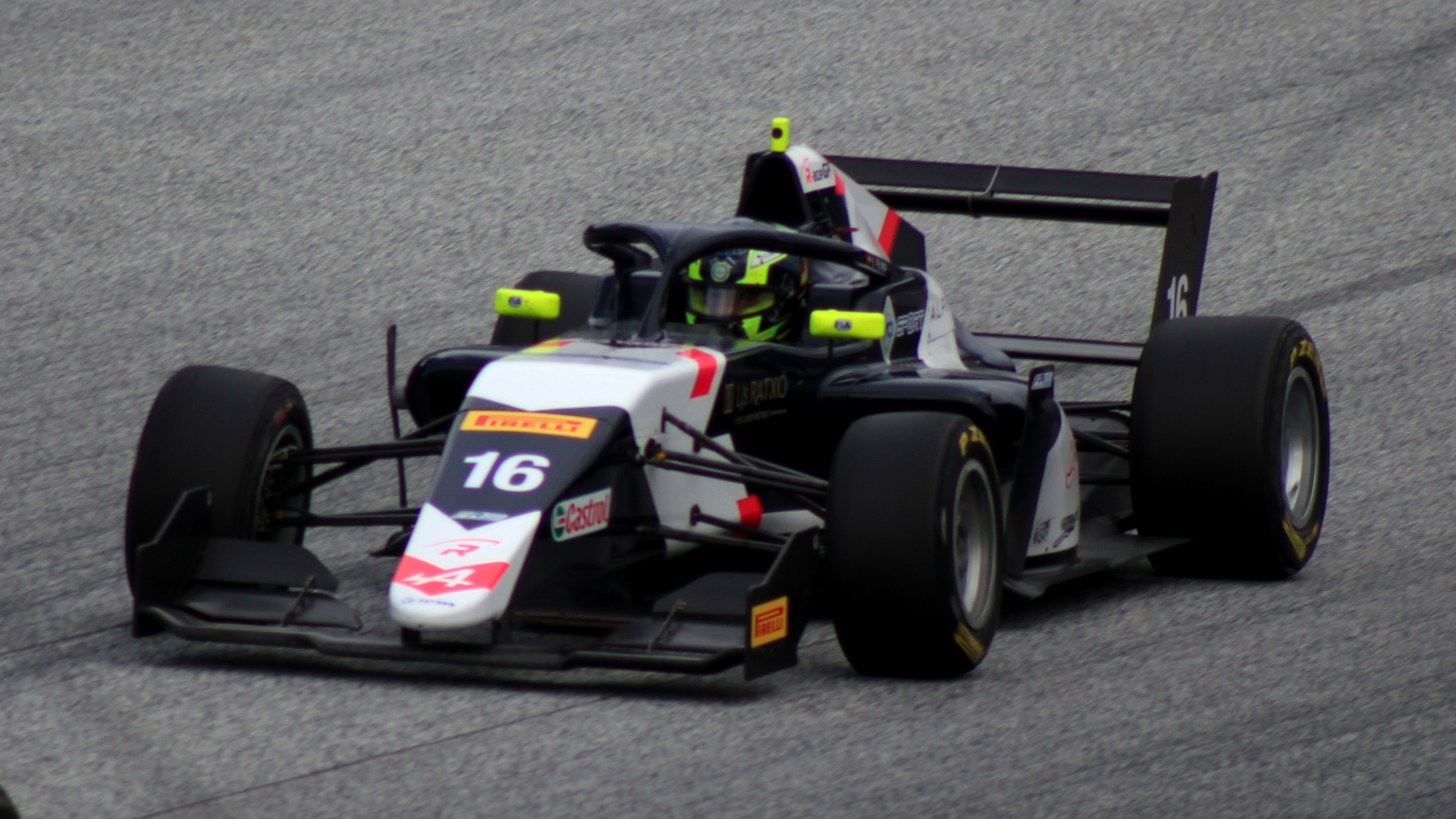
Fluxá racing in the 2022 Formula Regional European Championship at the Red Bull Ring.

At the beginning of 2022, Fluxá took part in the newly rebranded Formula Regional Asian Championship, driving for 3Y by R-ace GP. Having scored a podium during the first round, Fluxá finished tenth in the championship.

For his main campaign, Fluxá would move to R-ace GP, remaining in the Formula Regional European series. His season started in strong fashion, as he took his first podium in the series at the season opening race at Monza. However, following a late coming-together with teammate Gabriel Bortoleto in Race 2, Fluxá would have to wait for two rounds until scoring his next points, a pair of eighth-place finishes at Le Castellet. More points followed at Spa-Francorchamps, where Fluxá managed to finish fifth, before getting two points at the events in Austria and Spain respectively. He finished his season with another fifth place, this time at Mugello, which meant that Fluxá ended up twelfth in the standings, behind his teammates Hadrien David and Bortoleto.

==== 2023 ====
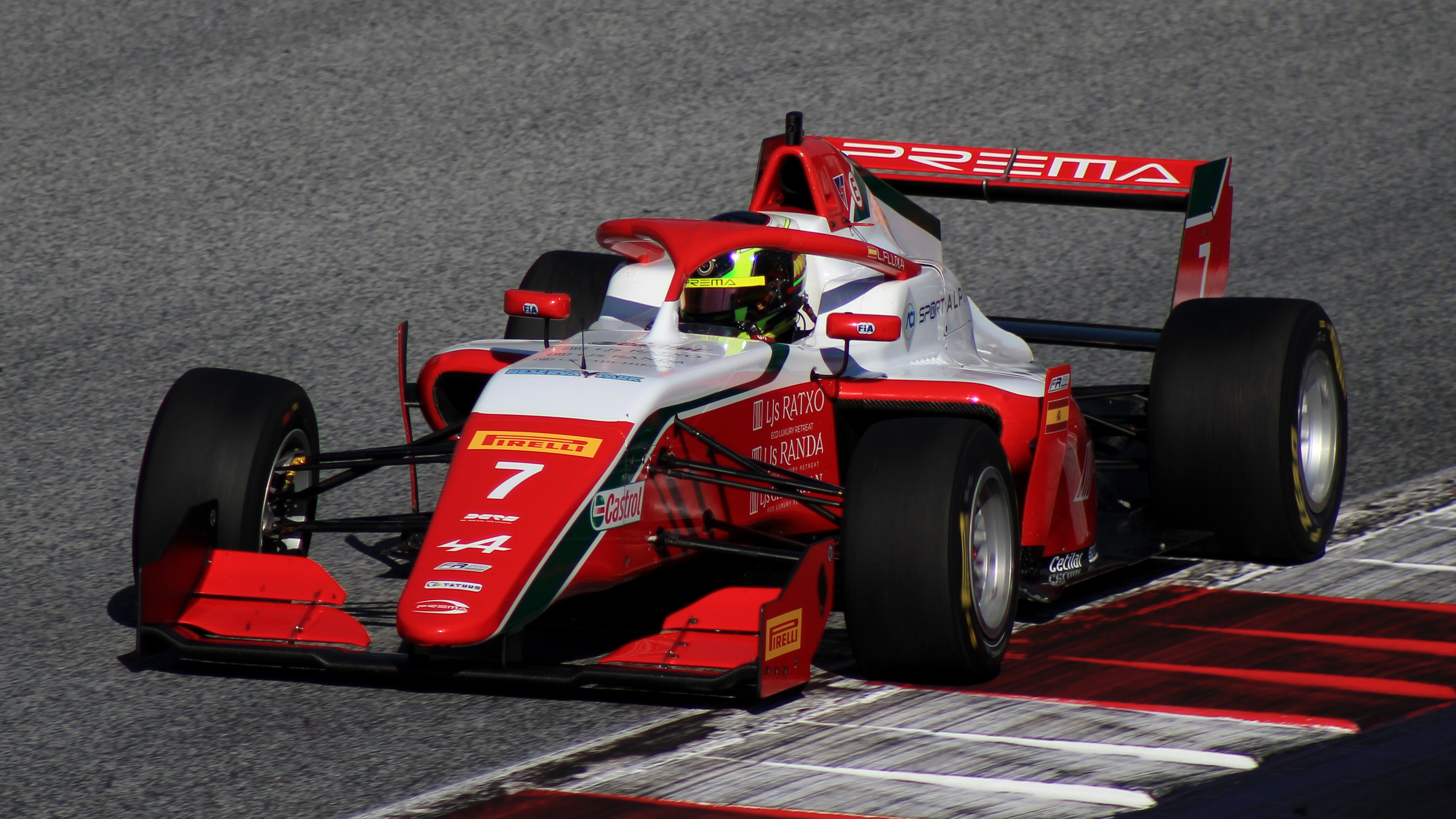
Fluxá racing in the 2023 Formula Regional European Championship at the Red Bull Ring.

At the beginning of 2023, Fluxá took part in the Formula Regional Middle East Championship with Mumbai Falcons, garnering three podiums and finishing fourth in the drivers' standings.

Fluxá opted to remain in FRECA for a third successive season in 2023, switching to Prema Racing to partner Andrea Kimi Antonelli and Rafael Câmara. Having taken fourth-place results in the opening pair of rounds, Fluxá would score his best result in his three years in the category at the Hungaroring, ending up second in race 2. More points at Spa and Mugello followed, before Fluxá experienced a scoreless round in Le Castellet.

=== FIA Formula 3 Championship ===
In late September 2022, Fluxá partook in the FIA Formula 3 post-season test with Van Amersfoort Racing during the second and third days.

=== Euroformula Open ===
Alongside his ELMS commitments, Fluxá competed part-time in the 2024 Euroformula Open with Team Motopark in 2024.

== Endurance racing career ==
=== 2024 ===
For 2024, Fluxá pivoted to endurance racing, racing in the European Le Mans Series with Cool Racing. Partnering Malthe Jakobsen and Ritomo Miyata in the LMP2 class, Fluxá would help his team win the season opener at Barcelona, where he took the lead during the opening hour.

== Personal life ==
Fluxá comes from a wealthy family which founded and owns notable Spanish companies Iberostar, Lottusse and Camper. His younger brother Lucas competes in the GB3 Championship, and his younger sister Luna currently competes in Formula 4 as part of the Mercedes Junior Team.

== Karting record ==
=== Karting career summary ===
Season	Series	Team	Position
2016	Spanish Championship — Cadet		8th
2016	WSK Final Cup — 60 Mini	Ward Racing	NC
2017	WSK Champions Cup — 60 Mini	Formula K Junior Team	NC
2017	WSK Super Master Series — 60 Mini	Formula K Junior Team	28th
2017	Spanish Championship — Cadet		4th
2017	WSK Final Cup — OKJ	Chiesa Corse	54th
2018	IAME Winter Cup — X30 Junior	Praga España Motorsport	13th
2018	South Garda Winter Cup — OKJ		65th
2018	WSK Super Master Series — OKJ	Lennox Racing Team	80th
2018	CIK-FIA European Championship — OKJ	Lennox Racing Team	26th
2018	CIK-FIA World Championship — OKJ	Lennox Racing Team	26th
2018	WSK Final Cup — OK	KR Motorsport	41st
2019	South Garda Winter Cup — OK	KR Motorsport	30th
2019	Andrea Margutti Trophy — OK	Team Driver Racing Kart	4th
2019	IAME Winter Cup — X30 Senior	Team Driver Racing Kart	NC
2019	CIK-FIA European Championship — OK	KR Motorsport	36th
2019	CIK-FIA World Championship — OK	KR Motorsport	20th

=== Complete CIK-FIA Karting European Championship results ===
(key) (Races in bold indicate pole position) (Races in italics indicate fastest lap)

Year	Team	Class	1	2	3	4	5	6	7	8	DC	Points
2018	Lennox Racing Team	OKJ	SAR; QH; 63	SAR; R DNQ	PFI; QH; 49	PFI; R DNQ	AMP; QH; 18	AMP; R 11	LEM; QH; 28	LEM; R 19	31st	4
2019	KR Motorsport Srl	OK	ANG; QH; 28	ANG; R 23	GEN; QH; 38	GEN; R DNQ	KRI; QH; WD	KRI; R WD	LEM; QH; 24	LEM; R 17	33rd	0

== Racing record ==
=== Racing career summary ===
Season	Series	Team	Races	Wins	Poles	F/Laps	Podiums	Points	Position
2020	Formula 4 UAE Championship	Xcel Motorsport	19	2	0	3	11	274	**2nd**
2020	F4 Spanish Championship	Global Racing Service	21	0	0	0	1	101	6th
2020	Italian F4 Championship	AKM Motorsport	3	0	0	0	0	0	31st
2021	Formula Regional European Championship	Van Amersfoort Racing	19	0	0	0	0	0	25th
2021	F3 Asian Championship	BlackArts Racing	15	0	0	0	0	25	14th
2021	24H TCE Series - TCR	Baporo Motorsport	1	0	0	0	0	0	NC
2022	Formula Regional Asian Championship	3Y by R-ace GP	15	0	0	0	1	64	10th
2022	Formula Regional European Championship	R-ace GP	19	0	0	0	1	51	12th
2023	Formula Regional Middle East Championship	Mumbai Falcons Racing Limited	15	0	0	0	3	122	4th
2023	Formula Regional European Championship	Prema Racing	20	0	0	0	1	88	7th
2023–24	Asian Le Mans Series - LMP2	Cool Racing	3	0	0	0	0	1	19th
2024	European Le Mans Series - LMP2	Cool Racing	6	2	0	0	2	62	**3rd**
2024	24 Hours of Le Mans - LMP2	Cool Racing	1	0	0	0	0	N/A	12th
2024	Euroformula Open Championship	Team Motopark	3	1	0	1	3	59	9th
2024	International GT Open	Team Motopark	7	0	0	0	0	27	16th
2025	European Le Mans Series - LMP2	Algarve Pro Racing	6	0	1	0	1	40	7th
2025	24 Hours of Le Mans - LMP2	Algarve Pro Racing	1	0	0	0	0	N/A	8th
2025–26	Asian Le Mans Series - LMP2	Proton Competition	6	0	0	0	0	19	15th
2026	GT World Challenge Europe Endurance Cup	Steller Motorsport	1	0	0	0	0	0	NC
2026	GT World Challenge Europe Endurance Cup - Gold	Steller Motorsport	1	0	0	0	0	9	21st
2026	European Le Mans Series - LMP2 Pro-Am	Vector Sport	6	1	0	0	1	65	5th
2026	24 Hours of Le Mans - LMP2 Pro-Am	Proton Competition	1	0	0	0	0	N/A	6th

* Season still in progress.

=== Complete Formula 4 UAE Championship results ===
(key) (Races in bold indicate pole position; races in italics indicate fastest lap)

Year	Team	1	2	3	4	5	6	7	8	9	10	11	12	13	14	15	16	17	18	19	20	DC	Points
2020	Xcel Motorsport	DUB1; 1; 2	DUB1; 2; 5	DUB1; 3; 3	DUB1; 4 C	YMC1; 1; 4	YMC1; 2 DSQ	YMC1; 3; 7	YMC1; 4; 3	YMC2; 1; 3	YMC2; 2; 4	YMC2; 3; 3	YMC2; 4; 4	DUB2; 1; 1	DUB2; 2; 4	DUB2; 3; 2	DUB2; 4; 5	DUB3; 1; 2	DUB3; 2; 2	DUB3; 3; 1	DUB3; 4; 2	2nd	274

=== Complete F4 Spanish Championship results ===
(key) (Races in bold indicate pole position) (Races in italics indicate fastest lap)

Year	Team	1	2	3	4	5	6	7	8	9	10	11	12	13	14	15	16	17	18	19	20	21	DC	Points
2020	Global Racing Service	NAV; 1; 4	NAV; 2; 3	NAV; 3; 6	LEC; 1; 7	LEC; 2; 15	LEC; 3; 6	JER; 1; 5	JER; 2; 5	JER; 3; 12	CRT; 1; 6	CRT; 2; 6	CRT; 3; 7	ARA; 1; 6	ARA; 2; 14	ARA; 3 Ret	JAR; 1; 11	JAR; 2; 8	JAR; 3 Ret	CAT; 1; 6	CAT; 2; 11	CAT; 3; 6	6th	101

=== Complete Formula Regional Asian Championship results ===
(key) (Races in bold indicate pole position) (Races in italics indicate fastest lap)

Year	Entrant	1	2	3	4	5	6	7	8	9	10	11	12	13	14	15	DC	Points
2021	BlackArts Racing Team	DUB; 1; 14	DUB; 2; 14	DUB; 3; 10	ABU; 1; 11	ABU; 2; 21	ABU; 3; 13	ABU; 1 Ret	ABU; 2; 4	ABU; 3; 9	DUB; 1; 13	DUB; 2; 7	DUB; 3; 14	ABU; 1 Ret	ABU; 2; 8	ABU; 3; 13	14th	25
2022	3Y by R-ace GP	ABU; 1; 6	ABU; 2; 2	ABU; 3; 8	DUB; 1; 13	DUB; 2; 5	DUB; 3; 9	DUB; 1; 11	DUB; 2; 5	DUB; 3; 8	DUB; 1; 11	DUB; 2; 9	DUB; 3; 16	ABU; 1; 16	ABU; 2; 9	ABU; 3; 8	10th	64

=== Complete Formula Regional European Championship results ===
(key) (Races in bold indicate pole position) (Races in italics indicate fastest lap)

Year	Team	1	2	3	4	5	6	7	8	9	10	11	12	13	14	15	16	17	18	19	20	DC	Points
2021	Van Amersfoort Racing	IMO; 1; 19	IMO; 2; 13	CAT; 1; 14	CAT; 2; 20	MCO; 1 DNS	MCO; 2 Ret	LEC; 1 Ret	LEC; 2; 19	ZAN; 1; 20	ZAN; 2; 15	SPA; 1; 12	SPA; 2; 20	RBR; 1; 19	RBR; 2; 16	VAL; 1; 19	VAL; 2; 23	MUG; 1; 19	MUG; 2; 24	MNZ; 1; 23	MNZ; 2; 19	25th	0
2022	R-ace GP	MNZ; 1; 3	MNZ; 2; 23	IMO; 1; 11	IMO; 2; 11	MCO; 1 DNQ	MCO; 2; 18	LEC; 1; 8	LEC; 2; 8	ZAN; 1; 15	ZAN; 2; 14	HUN; 1; 14	HUN; 2; 13	SPA; 1; 5	SPA; 2 Ret	RBR; 1; 9	RBR; 2 Ret	CAT; 1; 16	CAT; 2; 9	MUG; 1; 13	MUG; 2; 5	12th	51
2023	Prema Racing	IMO; 1; 4	IMO; 2 Ret	CAT; 1; 4	CAT; 2; 11	HUN; 1; 9	HUN; 2; 2	SPA; 1; 5	SPA; 2; 20	MUG; 1; 7	MUG; 2 Ret	LEC; 1; 11	LEC; 2 Ret	RBR; 1; 11	RBR; 2; 8	MNZ; 1; 18	MNZ; 2; 4	ZAN; 1; 8	ZAN; 2; 8	HOC; 1; 12	HOC; 2; 9	7th	88

=== Complete Formula Regional Middle East Championship results ===
(key) (Races in bold indicate pole position) (Races in italics indicate fastest lap)

Year	Entrant	1	2	3	4	5	6	7	8	9	10	11	12	13	14	15	DC	Points
2023	Mumbai Falcons Racing Limited	DUB1; 1; 8	DUB1; 2; 4	DUB1; 3; 11	KUW1; 1 Ret	KUW1; 2; 12	KUW1; 3; 4	KUW2; 1; 5	KUW2; 2; 3	KUW2; 3; 3	DUB2; 1; 8	DUB2; 2; 2	DUB2; 3; 5	ABU; 1; 4	ABU; 2; 5	ABU; 3; 11	4th	122

=== Complete Euroformula Open Championship results ===
(key) (Races in bold indicate pole position) (Races in italics indicate fastest lap)

Year	Team	1	2	3	4	5	6	7	8	9	10	11	12	13	14	15	16	17	18	19	20	21	22	23	24	Pos	Points
2024	Team Motopark	PRT; 1; 3	PRT; 2; 2	PRT; 3; 1	HOC; 1	HOC; 2	HOC; 3	SPA; 1	SPA; 2	SPA; 3	HUN; 1	HUN; 2	HUN; 3	LEC; 1	LEC; 2	LEC; 3	RBR; 1	RBR; 2	RBR; 3	CAT; 1	CAT; 2	CAT; 3	MNZ; 1	MNZ; 2	MNZ; 3	9th	59

=== Complete Asian Le Mans Series results ===
(key) (Races in bold indicate pole position) (Races in italics indicate fastest lap)

Year	Team	Class	Car	Engine	1	2	3	4	5	6	Pos.	Points
2023–24	Cool Racing	LMP2	Oreca 07	Gibson GK428 4.2 L V8	SEP; 1	SEP; 2	DUB; Ret	ABU; 1; 12	ABU; 2; 10		19th	1
2025–26	Proton Competition	LMP2	Oreca 07	Gibson GK428 4.2 L V8	SEP; 1; 9	SEP; 2; 5	DUB; 1; 10	DUB; 2; 13	ABU; 1; 7	ABU; 2; 13	15th	19

=== Complete European Le Mans Series results ===
(key) (Races in bold indicate pole position; results in italics indicate fastest lap)

Year	Entrant	Class	Chassis	Engine	1	2	3	4	5	6	Rank	Points
2024	Cool Racing	LMP2	Oreca 07	Gibson GK428 4.2 L V8	CAT; 1	LEC; Ret	IMO; Ret	SPA; 5	MUG; 9	ALG; 1	3rd	62
2025	Algarve Pro Racing	LMP2	Oreca 07	Gibson GK428 4.2 L V8	CAT; 5	LEC; 8	**IMO**; 3	SPA; 12	SIL; 5	ALG; Ret	7th	40
2026	Vector Sport	LMP2 Pro-Am	Oreca 07	Gibson GK428 4.2 L V8	CAT; 6	LEC; 5	IMO; 1	SPA; 7	SIL; 8	ALG; 4	5th	65

^{*} Season still in progress.

=== Complete 24 Hours of Le Mans results ===
Year	Team	Co-Drivers	Car	Class	Laps	Pos.	Class Pos.
2024	(Switzerland) Cool Racing	(Denmark) Malthe Jakobsen (Japan) Ritomo Miyata	Oreca 07-Gibson	LMP2	289	26th	12th
2025	(Portugal) Algarve Pro Racing	(Liechtenstein) Matthias Kaiser (France) Théo Pourchaire	Oreca 07-Gibson	LMP2	364	25th	8th
2026	(Germany) Proton Competition	(Austria) Horst Felbermayr Jr. (Austria) Horst Felix Felbermayr	Oreca 07-Gibson	LMP2	354	28th	14th
2026	(Germany) Proton Competition	(Austria) Horst Felbermayr Jr. (Austria) Horst Felix Felbermayr	Oreca 07-Gibson	LMP2 Pro-Am	354	28th	6th

=== Complete GT World Challenge Europe results ===
==== GT World Challenge Europe Endurance Cup ====
(key) (Races in bold indicate pole position) (Races in italics indicate fastest lap)

Year	Team	Car	Class	1	2	3	4	5	6	7	Pos.	Points
2026	Steller Motorsport	Chevrolet Corvette Z06 GT3.R	Gold	LEC; 38	MNZ	SPA; 6H	SPA; 12H	SPA; 24H	NÜR	ALG	21st	9
