= Andrea Rosso (footballer) =

Italian footballer (born 1984)

Personal information
- Date of birth: 27 July 1984 (age 42)
- Place of birth: Turin, Italy
- Height: 1.79 m (5 ft 10 in)
- Position: Midfielder

Team information
- Current team: USD Pralormo

Youth career
- –2000: Torino

Senior career*
Years	Team	Apps	(Gls)
2000–2001	Sangiustese		
2001–2004	Canavese	62	(0)
2004–2009	Ivrea	120	(5)
2009	Rodengo Saiano	13	(0)
2010	Carpenedolo	14	(3)
2010–2014	Pro Vercelli	101	(1)
2014–2015	Pavia	35	(0)
2015–2016	Cremonese	18	(0)
2016–2018	Cuneo	61	(1)
2018–2019	Borgaro Nobis	28	(0)
2019– 2021	GSD La Pianese		
- * Club domestic league appearances and goals as of 15:12, 7 January 2020 (UTC)

Andrea Rosso (born 27 July 1984) is an Italian football player who plays for USD Pralormo.

== Club career ==
He made his Serie C debut for Pro Vercelli on 14 September 2011 in a game against Como.

On 9 August 2019, Rosso joined GSD La Pianese.
