= Andrea Rosso (racing driver) =

Italian racing driver

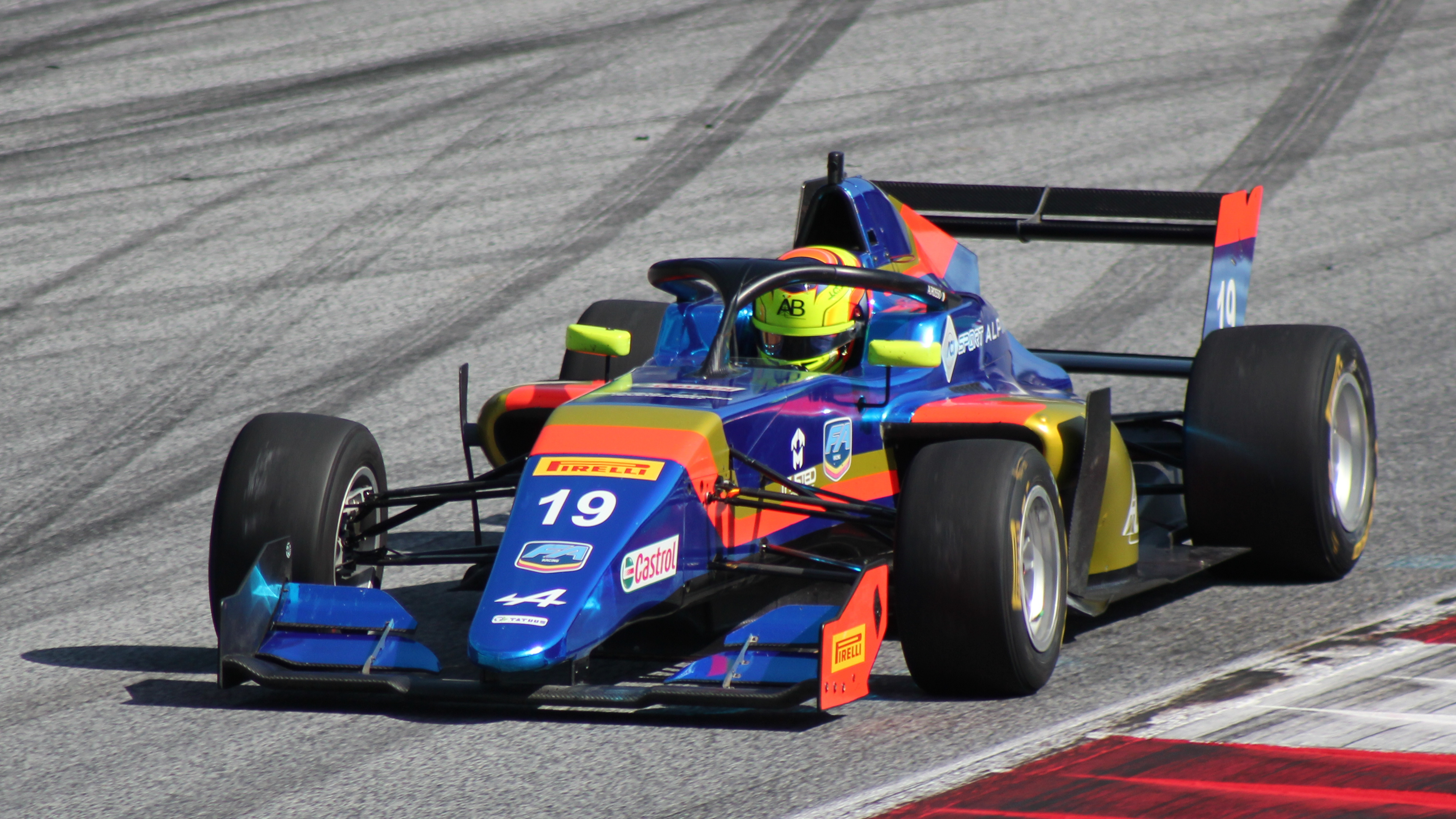
- Rosso racing in the 2021 Formula Regional European Championship at the Red Bull Ring
- Nationality: (Italy) Italian
- Born: 19 October 2003 (age 23) Turin, Italy

Formula Regional European Championship career
- Debut season: 2021
- Current team: RPM
- Car number: 19
- Former teams: FA Racing by MP
- Starts: 19 (20 entries)
- Wins: 0
- Podiums: 0
- Poles: 0
- Fastest laps: 0
- Best finish: 19th in 2021

Previous series
- 2019–2020 2019: Italian F4 Championship; FIA Motorsport Games F4 Cup

Championship titles
- 2019: FIA Motorsport Games F4 Cup
Medal record
Formula 4
Representing Italy
FIA Motorsport Games
Gold medal – first place	2019 Rome	Formula 4 Cup

Andrea Rosso (born 19 October 2003) is an Italian retired racing driver, who most recently competed for Race Performance Motorsport in the Formula Regional European Championship. He is the inaugural FIA Motorsport Games Formula 4 Cup champion, as well as an Italian F4 Championship race winner.

== Career ==
=== Karting ===
Rosso first drove a kart in 2007 at the age of four, but did not start competing until a few years later. Coming up through the ranks in his native Italy before making the move to Europe, he won the prestigious Andrea Margutti Trophy twice in consecutive years, first in OK-Junior in 2017 and then in OK in 2018. He also became the 2017 WSK Super Master Series champion in the OK-Junior class, beating the likes of Jack Doohan, Jonny Edgar and Roman Staněk. At the end of 2018, his last full season of competitive karting, Rosso was invited to participate in the 15th edition of the annual Supercorso Federale event at Vallelunga, as one of four young karting talents selected by ACI Sport.

=== Lower formulae ===
Rosso made his single-seater debut in the 2019 Italian F4 Championship, where he competed in four of the seven rounds for Antonelli Motorsport. He scored two points and ended the season 25th in the standings, while also taking a podium in the rookies' championship. That year, Rosso also took part in the Formula 4 Cup of the inaugural FIA Motorsport Games at Vallelunga. He won the main race after qualifying third and gaining a position in each of the races, and earned himself and his country a gold medal on home soil.

In 2020, Rosso switched to Cram Motorsport for a full season of Italian F4. He enjoyed a strong start to the campaign, and was well within the title fight alongside Gabriele Minì and Francesco Pizzi at the halfway point, having won three of the first ten races. However, a poor second half of the season followed, with a run of retirements, non-points finishes and even a DNS from pole at Monza eventually dropping him to seventh in the drivers' championship. At the end of the year, Rosso was again invited to ACI Sport's Supercorso Federale, together with Minì, Pizzi, Leonardo Fornaroli and four karting drivers. He received the Trofeo Cristiano del Balzo, awarded to the driver who showed more "commitment and passion".

=== Formula Regional European Championship ===
In March 2021, it was announced that Rosso would be making his debut in the Formula Regional European Championship, driving for Fernando Alonso's FA Racing team. He managed a best result of fifth at the Circuit Paul Ricard and finished 19th in the standings.

=== Retirement ===
Having initially tested a Honda NSX GT3 Evo during the winter in evaluation of a move to sportscar racing, Rosso announced his immediate retirement from racing on 2 April 2022, after 14 years of competing in karting and single-seaters. He stated that "the passion for this sport literally overwhelmed [him]".

=== Return ===
Only three months after announcing his retirement, Rosso returned to FRECA, having been called up by RPM for the sixth round at the Hungaroring as a replacement for driver-team manager Keith Donegan, who stepped back from his double duties.

== Karting record ==
=== Karting career summary ===
Season	Series	Team	Position
2010	Easykart International Grand Finals — Easy 50	RPKT	DNF
2012	Trofeo Nazionale Easykart — 60cc		11th
2012	Easykart International Grand Finals — 60 Mini	Red Passion Karting Team	17th
2013	Trofeo delle Industrie — 60 Mini		24th
2013	Trofeo Nazionale Easykart — 60cc	Mazzotti Corse	2nd
2014	Italian Championship — 60 Mini		11th
2014	Easykart International Grand Finals — Easy 60	Mig Racing	3rd
2014	Trofeo Nazionale Easykart — 60cc		1st
2015	Easykart International Grand Finals — Easy 100		2nd
2016	WSK Champions Cup — OKJ	MLG Racing	34th
2016	South Garda Winter Cup — OKJ		33rd
2016	Andrea Margutti Trophy — OKJ		12th
2016	Italian Championship — OKJ		3rd
2016	Trofeo delle Industrie — OKJ		9th
2016	CIK-FIA European Championship — OKJ	Morsicani Racing	61st
2016	CIK-FIA World Championship — OKJ	Birel ART Srl	16th
2016	WSK Night Edition — OKJ	Rosso, Alessandro	19th
2016	WSK Final Cup — OKJ	Rosso, Alessandro	14th
2017	South Garda Winter Cup — OKJ		30th
2017	Andrea Margutti Trophy — OKJ	Baby Race Srl	1st
2017	WSK Super Master Series — OKJ	Baby Race Srl	1st
2017	CIK-FIA European Championship — OKJ	Baby Race Srl	16th
2017	CIK-FIA World Championship — OKJ	Tony Kart Racing Team	10th
2017	Trofeo delle Industrie — OK	CRG SpA	5th
2017	WSK Final Cup — OK	CRG SpA	8th
2018	WSK Champions Cup — OK	CRG SpA	4th
2018	Andrea Margutti Trophy — OK	CRG SpA	1st
2018	German Karting Championship — OK	CRG SpA	11th
2018	WSK Super Master Series — OK	CRG SpA	30th
2018	CIK-FIA European Championship — OK	CRG SpA	19th
2018	CIK-FIA World Championship — OK	CRG SpA	31st
2018	WSK Final Cup — OK	CRG SpA	6th
2019	WSK Euro Series — OK	Birel ART Racing	41st
2019	CIK-FIA European Championship — OK	Birel ART Racing	NC
2019	CIK-FIA World Championship — OK	Birel ART Racing	NC
2019	WSK Open Cup — KZ2	Birel ART Racing	DNF

== Racing record ==
=== Racing career summary ===
Season	Series	Team	Races	Wins	Poles	F/Laps	Podiums	Points	Position
2019	Italian F4 Championship	Antonelli Motorsport	12	0	0	0	0	2	25th
2019	FIA Motorsport Games Formula 4 Cup	Team Italy	1	1	0	0	1	N/A	**1st**
2020	Italian F4 Championship	Cram Motorsport	19	3	2	1	5	140	7th
2021	Formula Regional European Championship	FA Racing by MP	19	0	0	0	0	14	19th
2022	Formula Regional European Championship	RPM	2	0	0	0	0	0	34th

* Season still in progress.

=== Complete Italian F4 Championship results ===
(key) (Races in bold indicate pole position) (Races in italics indicate fastest lap)

Year	Team	1	2	3	4	5	6	7	8	9	10	11	12	13	14	15	16	17	18	19	20	21	22	Pos	Points
2019	Antonelli Motorsport	VLL; 1; 18	VLL; 2 Ret	VLL; 3; 9	MIS; 1; 25	MIS; 2; 23	MIS; 3 C	HUN; 1; 22	HUN; 2; 31	HUN; 3 Ret	RBR; 1	RBR; 2	RBR; 3	IMO; 1; 19	IMO; 2; 24	IMO; 3 Ret	IMO; 4; 16	MUG; 1	MUG; 2	MUG; 3	MNZ; 1	MNZ; 2	MNZ; 3	25th	2
2020	Cram Motorsport	MIS; 1; 12	MIS; 2; 1	MIS; 3; 8	IMO1; 1; 10	IMO1; 2; 3	IMO1; 3; 1	RBR; 1 Ret	RBR; 2; 9	RBR; 3; 18	**MUG**; **1**; 1	MUG; 2; 4	MUG; 3; 4	MNZ; 1; 2	**MNZ**; **2** DNS	MNZ; 3 Ret	IMO2; 1; 11	IMO2; 2; 19	IMO2; 3; 14	VLL; 1; 10	VLL; 2 C	VLL; 3; 20		7th	140

=== Complete FIA Motorsport Games results ===
Year	Entrant	Cup	Qualifying	Quali Race	Main race
2019	Team Italy	**Formula 4**	**3rd**	**2nd**	**1st**

=== Complete Formula Regional European Championship results ===
(key) (Races in bold indicate pole position) (Races in italics indicate fastest lap)

Year	Team	1	2	3	4	5	6	7	8	9	10	11	12	13	14	15	16	17	18	19	20	DC	Points
2021	FA Racing by MP	IMO; 1; 12	IMO; 2; 20	CAT; 1; 13	CAT; 2; 11	MCO; 1; 13	MCO; 2; 9	LEC; 1; 13	LEC; 2; 5	ZAN; 1 DNS	ZAN; 2; 16	SPA; 1; 17	SPA; 2; 21	RBR; 1; 18	RBR; 2; 29	VAL; 1; 26	VAL; 2; 17	MUG; 1; 17	MUG; 2 Ret	MNZ; 1 Ret	MNZ; 2; 26	19th	14
2022	RPM	MNZ; 1	MNZ; 2	IMO; 1	IMO; 2	MCO; 1	MCO; 2	LEC; 1	LEC; 2	ZAN; 1	ZAN; 2	HUN; 1; 27	HUN; 2; 20	SPA; 1	SPA; 2	RBR; 1	RBR; 2	CAT; 1	CAT; 2	MUG; 1	MUG; 2	34th	0

* Season still in progress.
