= Pietro Delli Guanti =

Italian racing driver

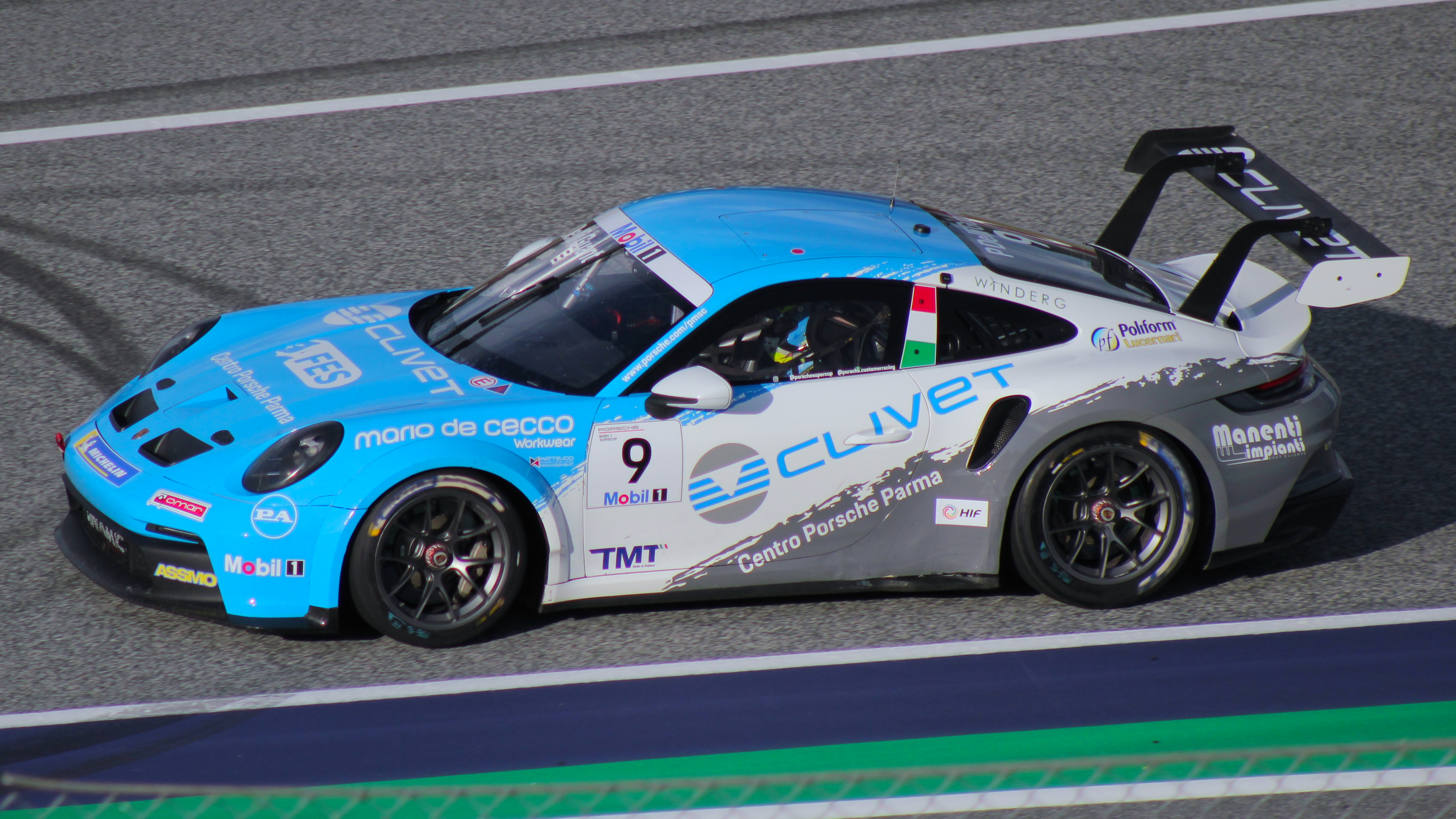
- Delli Guanti racing in the 2025 Porsche Supercup at the Red Bull Ring.
- Nationality: (Italy) Italian
- Born: 12 January 2004 (age 22) Vico del Gargano, Italy

Formula Regional European Championship career
- Debut season: 2021
- Current team: RPM
- Categorisation: FIA Silver
- Car number: 55
- Former teams: Monolite Racing
- Starts: 34 (34 entries)
- Wins: 0
- Podiums: 0
- Poles: 0
- Fastest laps: 0
- Best finish: 18th in 2021

Previous series
- 2019-2020: Italian F4 Championship

Pietro Delli Guanti (born 12 January 2004) is an Italian racing driver currently competing for Dinamic Motorsport in the Porsche Supercup.

== Career ==
=== Karting ===
Delli Guanti made his karting debut in 2015. He finished second in the ROK Cup International Final, ahead of now Red Bull Junior Jak Crawford. The Italian won the Italian Championship in 2018 in the ROK Senior class, and competed in the Karting World Championship in the same year.

=== Lower formulae ===
In 2020, Delli Guanti made his car racing debut in the Italian F4 Championship with BVM TECHNORACE . He scored his first win at the final Monza race, however he was unable to finish the season, with Pietro Armanni replacing him for the final round at Vallelunga. Delli Guanti finished twelfth in the drivers' standings, and achieved ninth place in the rookie championship.

=== Formula Regional European Championship ===
Delli Guanti progressed into the Formula Regional European Championship in 2021 with Monolite Racing.

== Karting record ==
=== Karting career summary ===
Season	Series	Team	Position
2015	WSK Night Edition — 60 Mini	Giugliano Kart	12th
2016	Italian Championship — 60 Mini		10th
2016	South Garda Winter Cup — KZ2		16th
2016	Trofeo delle Industrie — 60 Mini		8th
2016	WSK Night Edition — 60 Mini	Birel ART Racing	24th
2016	ROK Cup International Final — Mini ROK	Birel ART Racing	2nd
2016	WSK Super Master Series — 60 Mini		14th
2016	WSK Champions Cup — 60 Mini	Baby Race	DNF
2017	South Garda Winter Cup — OKJ		28th
2017	Andrea Margutti Trophy — OKJ	Energy Corse Srl	33rd
2017	German Karting Championship — OKJ		18th
2017	WSK Super Master Series — OKJ		37th
2018	Italian Championship — ROK Senior		1st
2018	CIK-FIA European Championship — OK	KSM Schumacher Racing Team	52nd
2018	CIK-FIA World Championship — OK	KSM Schumacher Racing Team	24th
2018	WSK Final Cup — OK		32nd
2018	WSK Super Master Series — OK		38th
2018	WSK Champions Cup — OK		12th
2019	FIA Karting International Super Cup — KZ2	CPB Sport	DNF
2021	WSK Champions Cup — KZ2	Birel ART	31st

== Racing record ==
=== Racing career summary ===
Season	Series	Team	Races	Wins	Poles	F/Laps	Podiums	Points	Position
2019	Italian F4 Championship	BVM Racing	8	0	0	0	0	0	35th
2020	Italian F4 Championship	BVM Racing	18	1	0	0	1	63	12th
2021	Formula Regional European Championship	Monolite Racing	20	0	0	0	0	18	18th
2022	Formula Regional European Championship	Race Performance Motorsport	14	0	0	0	0	1	25th
2022	Porsche Carrera Cup Italy	Dinamic Motorsport	4	0	0	0	0	24	17th
2022	Intercontinental GT Challenge	Tresor Attempto Racing	1	0	0	0	0	6	19th
2023	GT World Challenge Europe Endurance Cup	Tresor Attempto Racing	5	0	0	0	0	0	NC
2023	GT World Challenge Europe Endurance Cup - Silver Cup	Tresor Attempto Racing	5	1	1	0	2	87	**3rd**
2023	GT World Challenge Europe Sprint Cup	Tresor Attempto Racing	2	0	0	0	0	0	NC
2023	GT World Challenge Europe Sprint Cup - Silver Cup	Tresor Attempto Racing	2	0	0	0	0	6	19th
2024	GT World Challenge Europe Sprint Cup	Eurodent GSM Team	2	0	0	0	0	0	NC
2024	Italian GT Sprint Championship - GT3	Tresor Audi Sport Italia	8	1	0	0	3	81	**2nd**
2024	Italian GT Endurance Championship - GT3	Tresor Audi Sport Italia	4	0	0	1	1	43	4th
2024	GT World Challenge Europe Endurance Cup	Tresor Attempto Racing	1	0	0	0	0	0	NC
2025	Porsche Supercup	Dinamic Motorsport	6	0	0	0	0	11	20th
2025	Porsche Carrera Cup Italy	Archesse Racing	12	0	0	0	0	48	14th
2026	Porsche Carrera Cup Italy	Team Q8 Hi Perform	12	1	1	1	8	205	**2nd**
2026	GT Cup Open Europe	FAEMS Team by Ebimotors							

* Season still in progress.

=== Complete Italian F4 Championship results ===
(key) (Races in bold indicate pole position) (Races in italics indicate fastest lap)

Year	Team	1	2	3	4	5	6	7	8	9	10	11	12	13	14	15	16	17	18	19	20	21	22	Pos	Points
2019	BVM Racing	VLL; 1	VLL; 2	VLL; 3	MIS; 1; 28	MIS; 2; 21	MIS; 3 C	HUN; 1; 15	HUN; 2; 20	HUN; 3; 24	RBR; 1; 17	RBR; 2; 19	RBR; 3; 17	IMO; 1	IMO; 2	IMO; 3	IMO; 4	MUG; 1	MUG; 2	MUG; 3	MNZ; 1	MNZ; 2	MNZ; 3	35th	0
2020	BVM Racing	MIS; 1; 6	MIS; 2; 6	MIS; 3; 7	IMO1; 1; 12	IMO1; 2; 9	IMO1; 3; 8	RBR; 1; 12	RBR; 2; 6	RBR; 3; 25†	MUG; 1 Ret	MUG; 2; 9	MUG; 3; 12	MNZ; 1; 22†	MNZ; 2 Ret	MNZ; 3; 1	IMO2; 1; 30†	IMO2; 2; 20	IMO2; 3; 16	VLL; 1	VLL; 2	VLL; 3		12th	63

=== Complete Formula Regional European Championship results ===
(key) (Races in bold indicate pole position) (Races in italics indicate fastest lap)

Year	Team	1	2	3	4	5	6	7	8	9	10	11	12	13	14	15	16	17	18	19	20	DC	Points
2021	Monolite Racing	IMO; 1; 16	IMO; 2 Ret	CAT; 1; 11	CAT; 2; 13	MCO; 1; 11	MCO; 2; 13	LEC; 1; 17	LEC; 2; 13	ZAN; 1 Ret	ZAN; 2; 24	SPA; 1; 15	SPA; 2 Ret	RBR; 1; 15	RBR; 2; 5	VAL; 1; 16	VAL; 2; 19	MUG; 1; 7	MUG; 2; 9	MNZ; 1; 18	MNZ; 2; 22	18th	18
2022	Race Performance Motorsport	MNZ; 1 Ret	MNZ; 2; 24	IMO; 1; 16	IMO; 2 Ret	MCO; 1; 19	MCO; 2; 16	LEC; 1; 12	LEC; 2; 14	ZAN; 1; 10	ZAN; 2 Ret	HUN; 1; 21	HUN; 2; 29†	SPA; 1; 25	SPA; 2; 18	RBR; 1	RBR; 2	CAT; 1	CAT; 2	MUG; 1	MUG; 2	25th	1

=== Complete GT World Challenge Europe results ===
==== GT World Challenge Europe Endurance Cup ====
(key) (Races in bold indicate pole position) (Races in italics indicate fastest lap)

Year	Team	Car	Class	1	2	3	4	5	6	7	Pos.	Points
2023	Tresor Attempto Racing	Audi R8 LMS Evo II	Silver	**MNZ**; Ret	LEC; 15	SPA; 6H; 21	SPA; 12H; 23	SPA; 24H; 47	NÜR; 18	CAT; 28	3rd	87
2024	Tresor Attempto Racing	Audi R8 LMS Evo II	Silver	LEC	SPA; 6H	SPA; 12H	SPA; 24H	NÜR	MNZ	JED; 24	NC	0

==== GT World Challenge Europe Sprint Cup ====
(key) (Races in bold indicate pole position) (Races in italics indicate fastest lap)

Year	Team	Car	Class	1	2	3	4	5	6	7	8	9	10	Pos.	Points
2023	Tresor Attempto Racing	Audi R8 LMS Evo II	Silver	BRH; 1	BRH; 2	MIS; 1; 31	MIS; 2; 28	HOC; 1	HOC; 2	VAL; 1	VAL; 2	ZAN; 1	ZAN; 2	19th	6
2024	Eurodent GSM Team	Lamborghini Huracán GT3 Evo 2	Silver	BRH; 1	BRH; 2	MIS; 1; 25	MIS; 2; 29	HOC; 1	HOC; 2	MAG; 1	MAG; 2	CAT; 1	CAT; 2	15th	12

=== Complete Porsche Supercup results ===
(key) (Races in bold indicate pole position; races in italics indicate fastest lap)

Year	Team	1	2	3	4	5	6	7	8	Pos.	Points
2025	Dinamic Motorsport	IMO; 10	MON; 12‡	CAT; Ret	RBR; 19	SPA; 18	HUN; 13	ZAN	MNZ	20th	11

^{‡} Half points awarded as less than 75% of race distance was completed.
^{*} Season still in progress.
