= Théo Pourchaire =

French racing driver (born 2003)

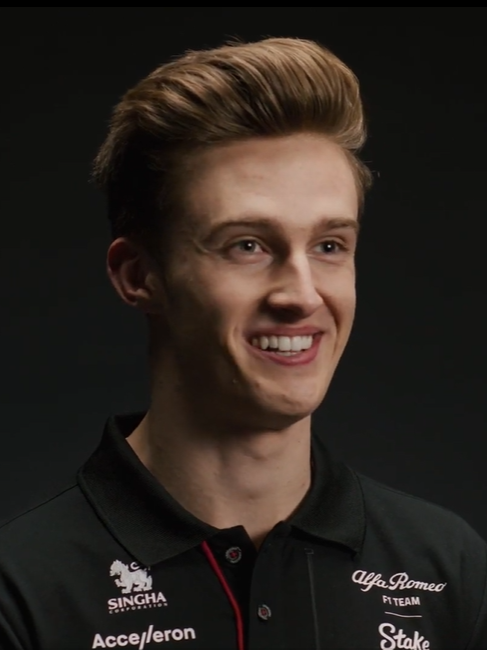
- Pourchaire in 2023
- Nationality: (France) French
- Born: Théo Jérôme Julien Pourchaire; 20 August 2003 (age 23) Grasse, Alpes-Maritimes, France

FIA World Endurance Championship career
- Debut season: 2025
- Current team: Peugeot TotalEnergies
- Categorisation: FIA Platinum
- Car number: 93
- Starts: 9
- Wins: 0
- Podiums: 0
- Poles: 1
- Fastest laps: 0
- Best finish: 18th in 2026

IndyCar Series career
- 6 races run over 1 year
- Best finish: 28th (2024)
- First race: 2024 Grand Prix of Long Beach (Long Beach)
- Last race: 2024 Honda Indy Toronto (Exhibition Place)
Wins	Podiums	Poles
0	0	0

Previous series
- 2025 2024 2024 2020–2023 2020 2019 2018: European Le Mans Series; IndyCar Series; Super Formula; FIA Formula 2 FIA Formula 3 ADAC Formula 4 French F4 Junior

Championship titles
- 2023 2019 2018: FIA Formula 2 ADAC Formula 4 French F4 Junior

Théo Jérôme Julien Pourchaire (French pronunciation: [te.o puʁ.ʃɛʁ]; born 20 August 2003) is a French racing driver who is set to compete in Formula E for the Opel GSE Formula E Team and currently serves as development driver in Formula One for Mercedes. He is the 2023 Formula 2 champion, and the 2020 Formula 3 runner-up.

A former member of the Sauber Academy, Pourchaire started racing in single-seaters in 2018, and came third in the French F4 Championship. The following year, he won the 2019 ADAC Formula 4 Championship for US Racing–CHRS, scrapping with Dennis Hauger to the title. Pourchaire signed with ART Grand Prix for the 2020 FIA Formula 3 Championship and ended the season as runner-up behind Oscar Piastri by three points.

ART then promoted Pourchaire to the FIA Formula 2 Championship in 2021, ranking fifth in his rookie year. He was runner-up to Felipe Drugovich in 2022, and claimed the title in 2023. In 2024, he temporarily raced in IndyCar with Arrow McLaren, initially to substitute for the injured David Malukas before being signed permanently, and then dropped in favour of Nolan Siegel. He returned to full-time racing in 2025, joining the European Le Mans Series with Algarve Pro Racing.

== Junior racing career ==
=== Karting (2010–2017) ===
Born in Grasse, Pourchaire began karting at the age of two and a half and made his competitive debut at age seven. From there, he claimed multiple championships in his native France, as well as finishing third in the CIK-FIA OKJ and DKM Junior championships.

=== Formula 4 (2018–2019) ===
==== 2018: French F4 ====
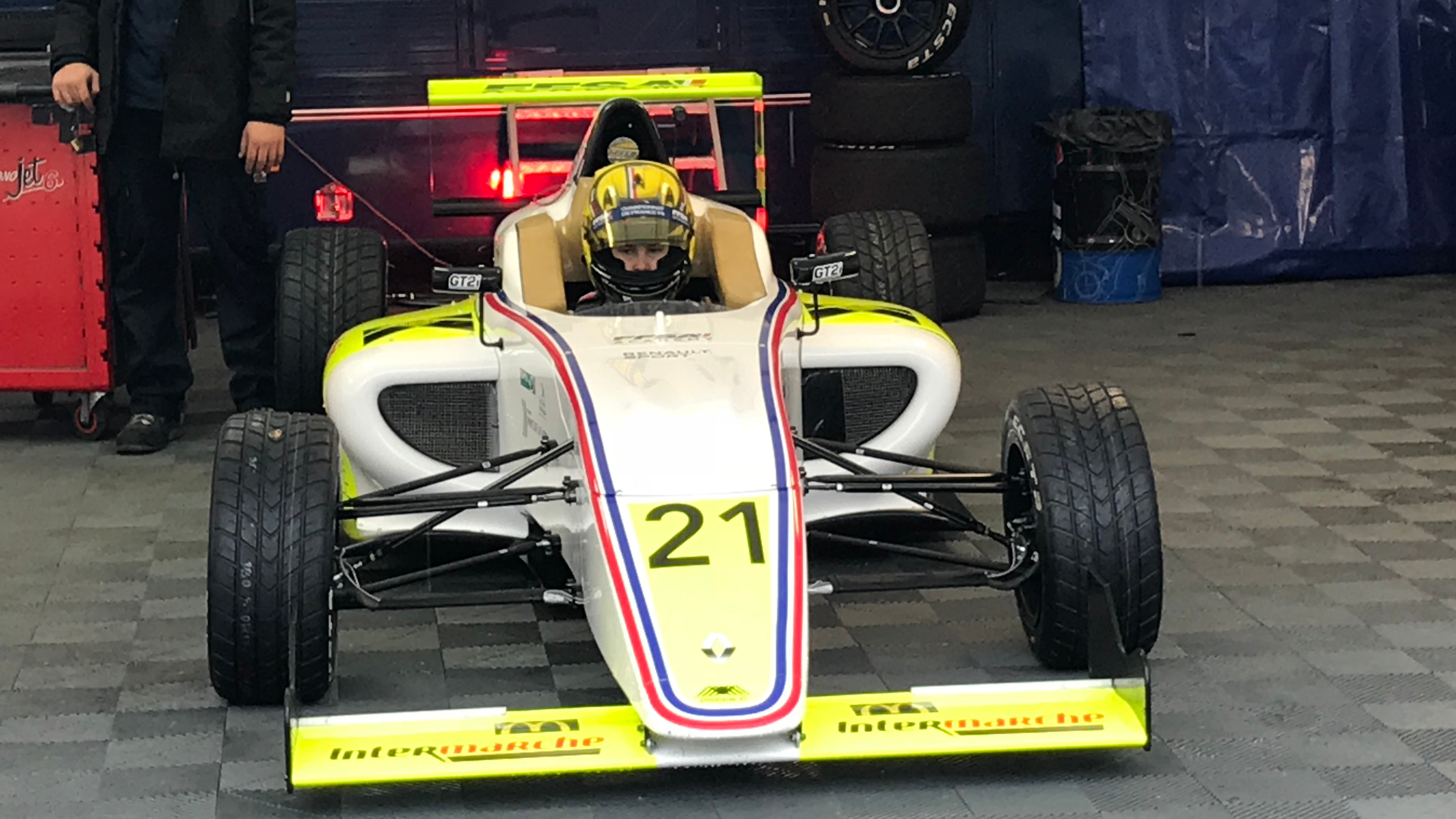
Pourchaire at the 2018 French F4 Championship

In 2018, aged fourteen, Pourchaire stepped up to single-seaters, contesting the French F4 championship. Despite being ineligible for the main championship on account of his age, he made an immediate impression at the opening round in Circuit de Nogaro, taking second and third in the first two races to secure his maiden podium finishes in car racing. Pourchaire’s breakthrough moment came in Spa-Francorchamps, where he claimed his first single-seater victory in Race 2 after a composed drive from the front of the field.. It would be his only win of the season. Pourchaire returned to the podium in Magny Cours finishing second in Race 1 before being forced to retire from the second with a mechanical issue. He recovered strongly in Race 3 to take another second-place finish. but overall claimed seven podiums during the season. More podium results followed as the season progressed, including a fourth place in Jerez; promoted due to a guest driver finishing ahead; and a double podium at the season finale in Paul Ricard. Across the season, Pourchaire recorded seven overall podiums and finished third in the championship standings behind Ugo de Wilde and champion Caio Collet. In the junior category, he claimed sixteen junior victories to be crowned Junior Champion.

Three years later in 2021, Pourchaire completed a French F4 test at Circuit Paul Ricard.

==== 2019: ADAC Formula 4 ====
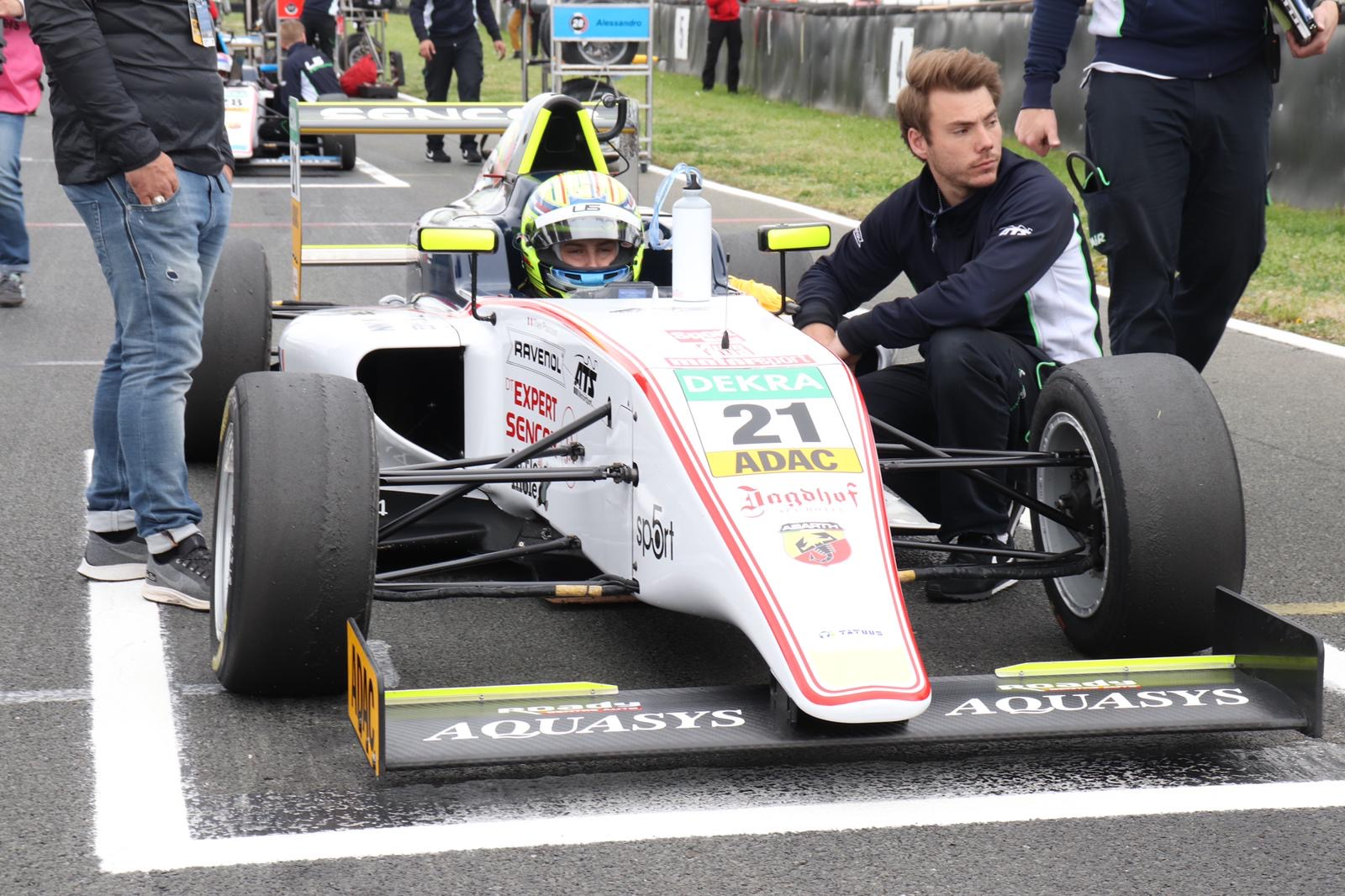
Pourchaire at the 2019 ADAC Formula 4 Championship

Pourchaire remained in Formula 4 for 2019, switching to the ADAC Formula 4 championship with US Racing-CHRS outfit. He recorded his first podium in the series with second place in the second race in Oschersleben. Another runner-up finish followed at the Red Bull Ring, where a post-race penalty for Dennis Hauger promoted Pourchaire to his maiden ADAC F4 victory. He followed it up with third place the next day. At the German Grand Prix support round in Hockenheim, Pourchaire secured a pair of podium finishes, before collecting two further third places in Zandvoort. His strongest weekend came at the Nürburgring, where he took two victories to extend his championship lead. The second visit to Hockenheim proved more difficult; he collided with fellow Sauber junior Arthur Leclerc in the first race and stalled at the start of the second. With Hauger winning all three races, Pourchaire's advantage shrunk from 68 to just one point. At the Sachsenring title decider, a win and two runner-up places secured Pourchaire the championship over Hauger by seven points.

=== FIA Formula 3 (2020) ===
Pourchaire took part in the 2019 post-season test at Circuit Ricardo Tormo with Carlin Buzz Racing and ART Grand Prix. In December, he joined ART to contest the 2020 season. Pourchaire encountered a difficult start at the Red Bull Ring, qualifying 20th and finishing outside the points in both races. One week later, he rebounded strongly, qualifying fifth and taking ninth in Race 1. Starting second for Race 2, he took the lead from Jake Hughes into the first corner. Despite losing positions to Hughes and Liam Lawson, their later collision handed Pourchaire Formula 3 victory, making him making him the youngest winner in FIA F3 history at sixteen. At the Hungaroring, Pourchaire qualified third and moved into the lead after Logan Sargeant and Alexander Smolyar made contact. He dominated the red-flagged race to take his second win by nearly twelve seconds. He completed a solid weekend with sixth place in Race 2. Pourchaire had a tougher outing in Silverstone, finishing twelfth in the first race and eighth during the second. During the second Silverstone event, Pourchaire qualified sixth held the position in Race 1 after battles with Bent Viscaal and Oscar Piastri, and climbed to third in Race 2 to secure his third podium of the year. Consistent points followed in Barcelona, where he finished seventh and sixth.

Pourchaire qualified on the front row in Spa-Francorchamps, finishing second behind Lirim Zendeli in Race 1. The next day, he placed fifth after dropping from an early podium position. A decisive run of form began in Monza, where he claimed his first pole position, though a five-place grid penalty for driving unnecessarily slowly set him back for Race 1. He surged to the front by passing Lawson on lap 4, before finishing second after a late overtake from Frederik Vesti. A difficult start in Race 2 dropped him to 17th, but he recovered to third, later promoted to second after Lawson’s penalty. Leaving Monza, Pourchaire moved to third in the standings, 24 points adrift of leader Piastri. In the Mugello finale. Pourchaire qualified seventh, ahead of Piastri but behind Sargeant. He passed Sargeant in Race 1 and overtook Zendeli on the final lap to finish third, reducing his deficit to nine points entering the final race. In the decider, Sargeant retired on the opening lap while Pourchaire climbed to third; however, Piastri's advance to seventh ensured the Australian the title by three points over Pourchaire. Pourchaire finished the season runner-up with two wins, eight podiums and 161 points, and was one of only a few full-time drivers to finish every race.

=== FIA Formula 2 (2020–2023) ===
==== 2020: Formula 2 debut ====
Pourchaire made his Formula 2 debut during the 2020 Sakhir Formula 2 round with HWA Racelab.

In October 2020, it was announced that Pourchaire would make his FIA Formula 2 Championship debut at the final two rounds of the 2020 season at the Bahrain International Circuit. He drove for HWA Racelab, replacing former FIA Formula 3 competitor Jake Hughes and partnering Artem Markelov. Pourchaire qualified sixteenth for the first feature race and finished eighteenth. In the first sprint race, he was forced to retire when his fire extinguisher deployed inside his cockpit. He finished the final two races in 18th and 21st place, respectively.

==== 2021: Learning year and maiden Formula 2 victories ====
In January 2021 it was announced that he would join ART Grand Prix for the 2021 Formula 2 Championship alongside then Alpine junior Christian Lundgaard. Looking towards his first full campaign of F2, Pourchaire stated that "[this] year will be tough, but it is going to be really important." At the Bahrain season opener, Pourchaire qualified eleventh, but was elevated to tenth following Jüri Vips's disqualification, earning reverse pole for the first sprint. After being overtaken by Liam Lawson at the start, he retired from second place with a mechanical issue mid-race. He recovered to score his first points in the second sprint with sixth place having started nineteenth, and finished eighth in the feature race. A breakthrough came in Monaco where he secured pole position, breaking the record for the youngest polesitter in Formula 2 history. After finishing seventh and fourth in the sprint races, Pourchaire converted pole into victory in the feature race, becoming the youngest race winner in F2/GP2 history, usurping the record previously held by Lando Norris. Upon winning, Pourchaire admitted that "he cried on the radio" and it was "a dream come true".

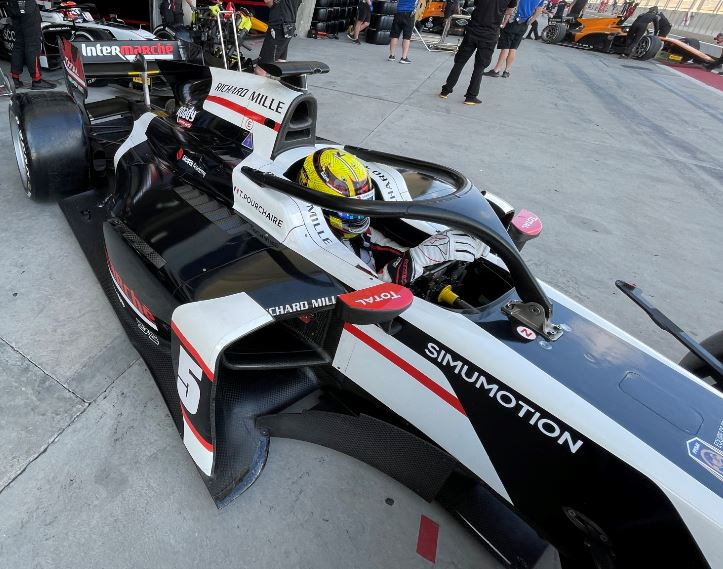
Pourchaire during the 2020 post-season testing at the Bahrain International Circuit

In Baku, Pourchaire qualified fourth and finished fifth in Sprint Race 1. His weekend unravelled in the second sprint when opening lap contact with Ralph Boschung damaged his front wing, leaving him ninth at the flag. A first-lap collision with Marcus Armstrong and Dan Ticktum during the feature race left Pourchaire with a fractured left wrist. He criticised Ticktum after the incident, while Ticktum received an in-race penalty. Despite initially being unsure of competing in Silverstone, Pourchaire recovered in time for the event. before the round began. He finished fifth in Sprint Race 1 and eighth in the feature race, later noting he still felt "a little pain" from the Baku injury.

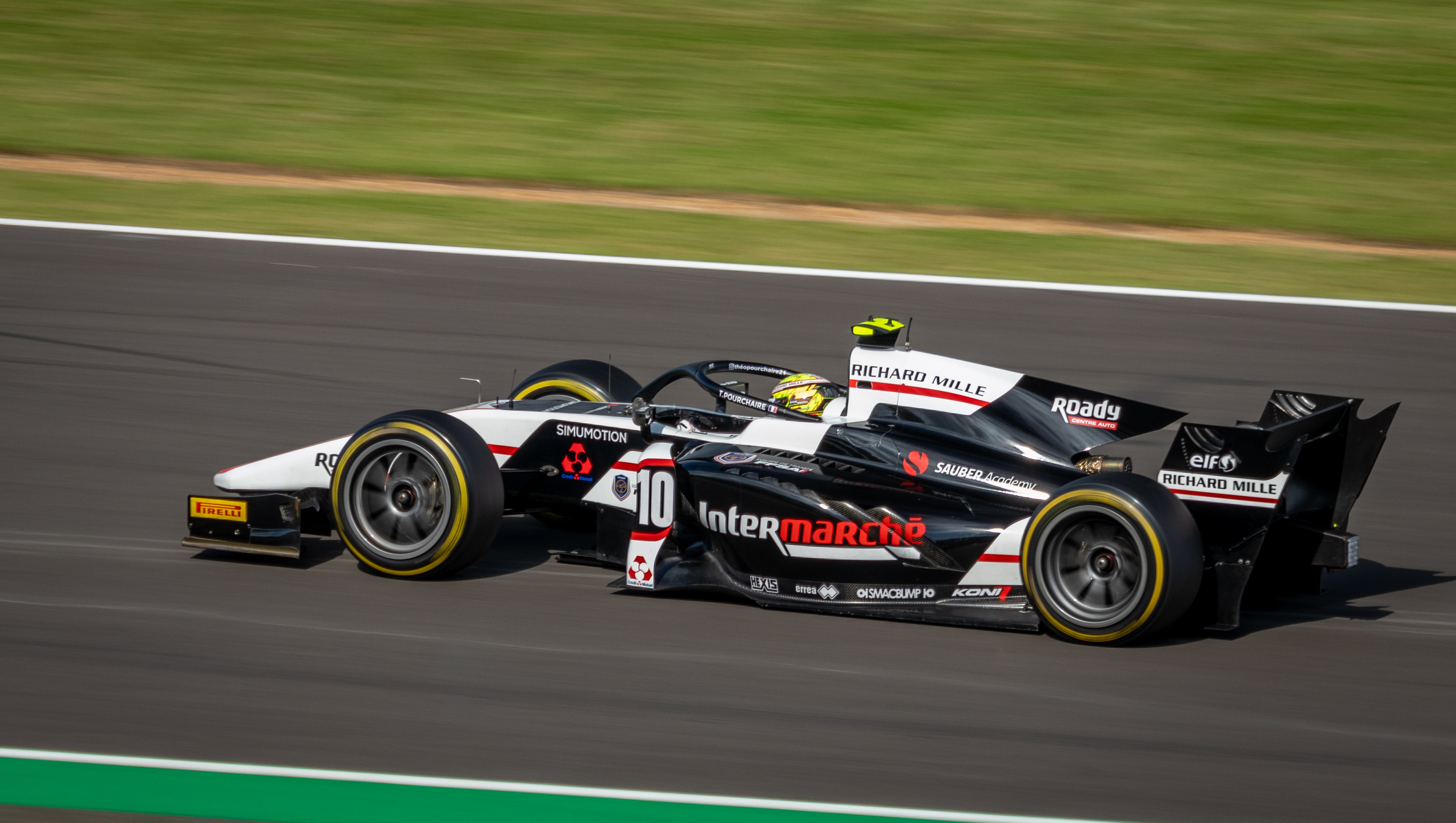
Pourchaire driving the Dallara F2 2018 during the 2021 Silverstone Formula 2 round

Pourchaire returned to winning form in Monza with his second victory of the season, overtaking Ticktum early in Sprint Race 1 before hunting and passing Vips for the lead. He narrowly missed out on a second podium that weekend during the feature race after being caught by Ticktum’s fresher tyres late in the feature race. Pourchaire qualified third in Sochi. He finished fifth in Sprint Race 1 after avoiding Jehan Daruvala's late spin, and delivered a strong performance in the feature race was more successful, jumping Oscar Piastri in the pit cycle before losing the position on colder tyres. He eventually finished second, two seconds behind Piastri.

In Jeddah, Pourchaire once again qualified third but crashed out of Sprint Race 1 while running seventh. He rebounded in the second sprint, climbing from 19th to sixth despite reporting difficult drivability of the car from the accident. The feature race was marred by a heavy start-line collision with Enzo Fittipaldi, who struck Pourchaire's stalled car. Pourchaire escaped uninjured, though Fittipaldi sustained injuries. In the Abu Dhabi finale, Pourchaire finished seventh and ninth in the sprint races, which was followed by a fourth place in the feature race after a close battle with Felipe Drugovich. Pourchaire ended his rookie Formula 2 campaign fifth in the standings with 140 points, comfortably ahead of teammate Lundgaard. His season included one pole position, two victories, four fastest laps and three further podium finishes.

==== 2022: Vice-Champion ====
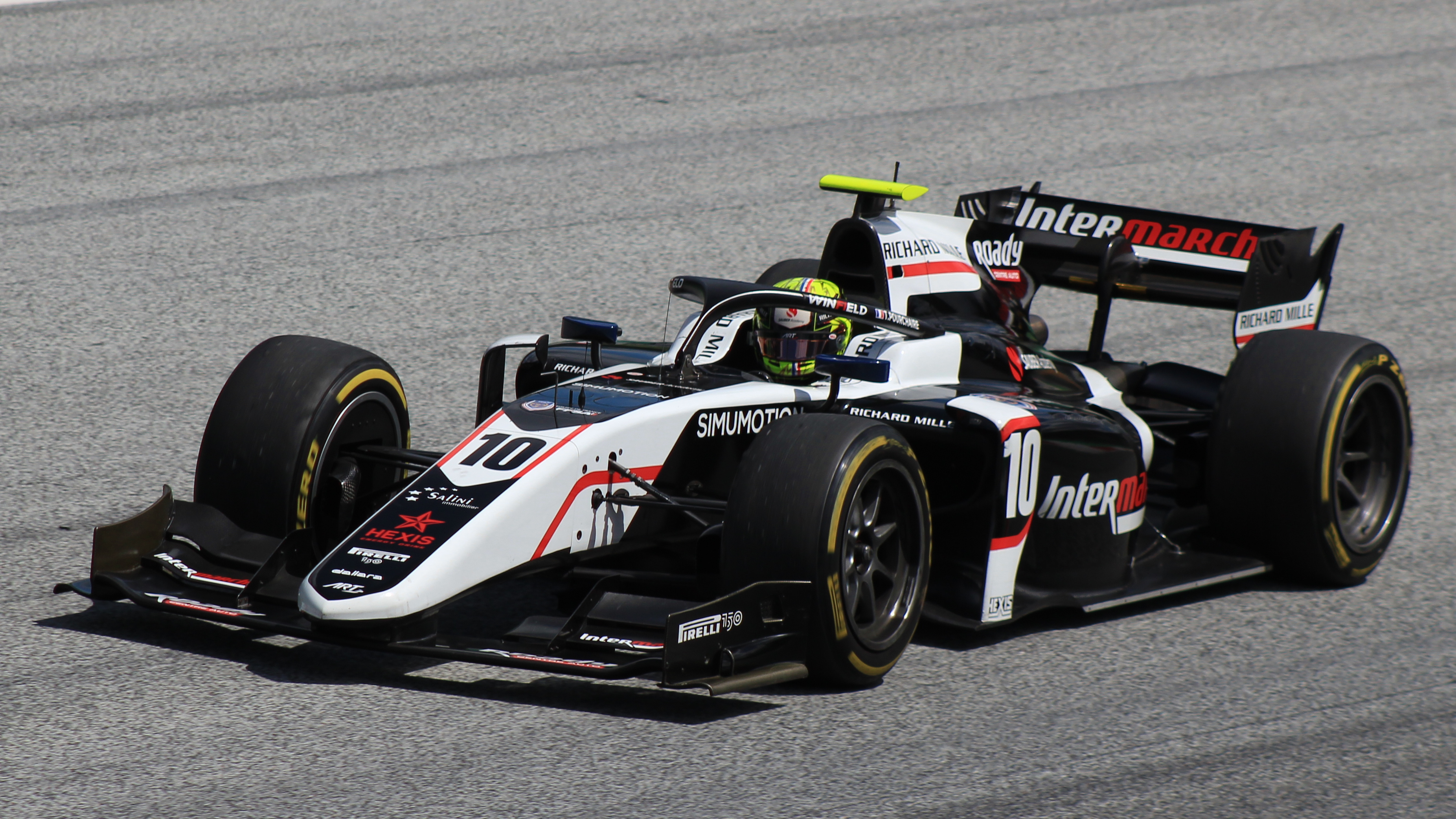
Pourchaire driving for ART Grand Prix during the 2022 Spielberg Formula 2 round

Pourchaire stayed with ART Grand Prix for the 2022 season, alongside F3 graduate and Mercedes junior Frederik Vesti. Entering his sophomore season, Pourchaire was regarded as one of the title favourites.

He began the campaign strongly in Bahrain, qualifying second, but endured a mechanical retirement during the sprint race having made his way to fifth. In the feature race however, Pourchaire capitalised on strategic opportunities and an incident for polesitter Jack Doohan to secure his first victory of the year, despite a broken visor that caused a lack of concentration. However, he endured a difficult weekend in Jeddah marked by car issues; this ultimately led to a retirement in the feature race and it costed him the championship lead. Pourchaire returned to form in Imola as he secured the feature race victory after benefitting from crashes ahead of him; this allowed him to briefly reclaim the championship lead. Consistent points finishes followed in Barcelona, but lost the championship lead once more after title rival Felipe Drugovich secured both victories that weekend.

He followed this with a second place finish in the Monaco feature race having qualified second, having pressured Drugovich throughout the whole of the race. In Baku, he qualified outside the top ten and only salvaged a seventh place finish in the sprint race, as his feature race was compromised after sustaining damage during a safety car restart. In Silverstone, Pourchaire finished fourth in the sprint after numerous overtakes from ninth, and secured another second place in the feature race after pressuring Logan Sargeant throughout the race. He took back-to-back podiums in the Austrian sprint race, retaining his podium position following an investigation on track limits. A strategic misstep backfired for Pourchaire in the feature race after starting on wet tyres on a drying track; he finished thirteenth. At his home round in France, Pourchaire initially finished third in the sprint race, but was stripped of the rostrum after forcing Marcus Armstrong off-track. He redeemed himself with an early pit stop during the feature race, allowing him to finish in second place. He reignited the title fight in Hungary after qualifying fourth, where he won the feature race in a controlled drive.

Pourchaire's title bid faltered starting in Spa-Francorchamps, where he only took three points which all came from the sprint race, as an early gearbox issue forced him to retire in the feature race. A crash in qualifying left him sixteenth in Zandvoort, and only finished ninth in the feature race after an early safety car failed to pay in his favour. As Drugovich extended his lead to 70 points, Pourchaire acknowledged that his title hopes were effectively over. Monza brought further misfortune. A red flag interrupted his qualifying run and left Pourchaire fourteenth, and finishing outside the top six in the sprint race mathematically eliminated him from title contention. His feature race ended on the opening lap after contact with Ralph Boschung and Luca Ghiotto. At the season finale in Abu Dhabi, Pourchaire qualified third, but retired from the feature race after hitting a bird while running inside the top-four.

Despite his late season setback, Pourchaire finished runner-up in the championship with three wins, seven podiums and 164 points. He took part in the post-season test with ART amidst uncertainty of where he would race in 2023.

==== 2023: Champion ====
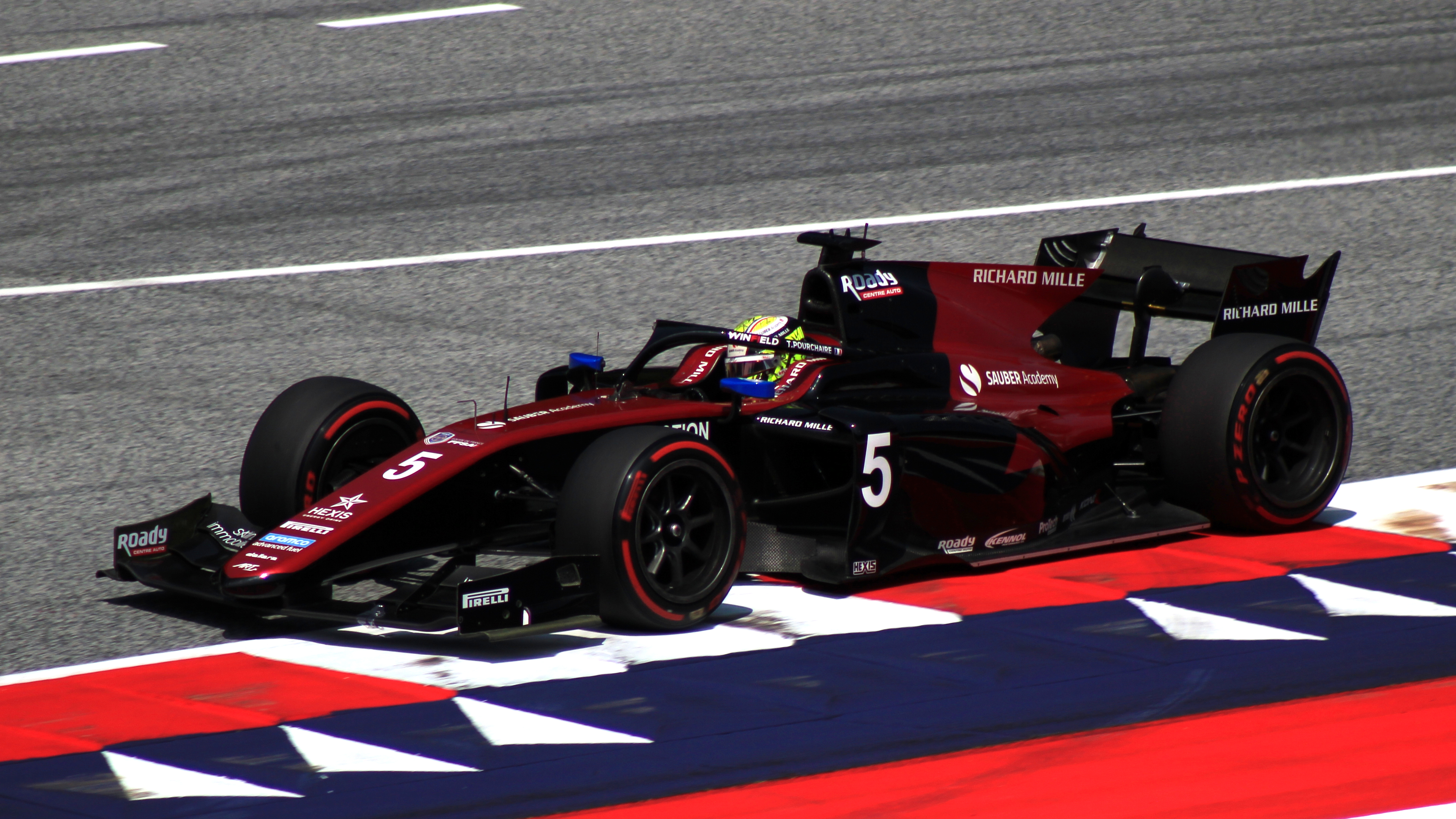
Pourchaire during the 2023 Spielberg Formula 2 round

Pourchaire remained with ART Grand Prix in 2023 alongside reigning F3 champion Victor Martins. Despite previously stating that he did not intend to pursue a third Formula 2 campaign, Sauber later committed to financing his 2023 season, prompting his return to the series. At the opening round in Bahrain, Pourchaire delivered a dominant qualifying performance, securing pole position by over seven tenths. After finishing fifth in the sprint race following a strong opening lap, he proceeded to convert pole into a commanding feature race victory, winning by nineteen seconds to take an early championship lead. His Jeddah weekend proved more challenging. Although he qualified third, a collision with Oliver Bearman in the sprint race resulted in a grid penalty for the feature race, where he finished outside the points. In Melbourne, Pourchaire continued his strong qualifying form by securing second, and maintained his position in the feature race to return to the rostrum behind Ayumu Iwasa. In Baku, he again qualified third, but ended his sprint race in the wall due to cold tyres. Nevertheless, he redeemed himself with third place in the feature race, having briefly led at the start.

In Monaco, Pourchaire qualified third and went on to finish second place in the feature race. In Barcelona, he recovered from a three-place grid drop in the sprint race to finish second in wet conditions, before finishing seventh in the feature race, conceding further points to title rival Frederik Vesti. Pourchaire qualified third at Austria. In the sprint, In the sprint race, he climbed to second on wet tyres amid mixed strategies, but was forced into an additional pit stop as the track dried, dropping to fourteenth. He was disadvantaged by a late safety car in the feature race, where he dropped to eighth after being passed by rivals on fresher tyres. Despite qualifying eighth in Silverstone, he secured his first double podium of the season; finishing second in the sprint race after numerous overtakes, and third in the feature race, significantly reducing title leader Vesti's championship advantage.

In Budapest, he finished fourth in the sprint after a battle with Oliver Bearman, and sixth in the feature race despite suffering from tyre degradation. He returned to the rostrum in the Spa-Francorchamps sprint race by finishing third; he was later elevated a further position following Richard Verschoor's disqualification. In the feature race, Pourchaire appeared on course for his second win of the season after gaining the lead during the pit stop phase. A late safety car, however, allowed Jack Doohan, who was on an alternate strategy, to pit and eventually pass him for the lead. Nevertheless, his second place enabled him to reclaim the championship lead after Vesti failed to start the race. Pourchaire endured a non-scoring round in Zandvoort, as he crashed out of the feature race shortly after pitting. He responded strongly in Monza, securing pole position. After multiple overtakes saw him fourth in the sprint race, he went on to claim third in the feature race after losing the lead early. With Vesti's retirement, Pourchaire extended his championship advantage to 25 points heading into the final round.

Entering the Abu Dhabi season finale with little margin for error, Pourchaire qualified fourteenth, but limited the damage in the sprint race with a seventh place finish. In the feature race, he executed an effective undercut strategy to finish fifth, securing the Formula 2 Drivers’ Championship. Upon his crowning moment, he was quick to praise ART and said that "it's a great, great end to a beautiful story together". Pourchaire concluded the season with one victory, two pole positions, ten podium finishes and 203 points, while also helping ART Grand Prix secure the Teams’ Championship for the first time.

=== Super Formula (2024) ===
Pourchaire was set for a Super Formula test at the Suzuka Circuit from 7–8 December 2022 with Kondo Racing but was called off. His first test came about on 6–8 December the following year, as the Frenchman drove for Team Impul at Suzuka.

==== 2024: Curtailed campaign ====
Team Impul soon confirmed that Pourchaire would race for them in the 2024 Super Formula Championship. In the first race of the season in Suzuka, he finished eighteenth after an off-track excursion that made him lose many positions. Pourchaire then withdrew from the championship altogether to participate in the IndyCar with Arrow McLaren; he was replaced by Ben Barnicoat for the next round of the season at Autopolis.

== Formula One ==
=== Alfa Romeo / Sauber (2019–2024) ===
As part of his signing with US Racing-CHRS for the 2019 ADAC Formula 4 Championship, Pourchaire was made a member of the Sauber Junior Team. In June 2020, Pourchaire renewed his relationship with the scheme.

Pourchaire completed his first Formula One test in August 2021, driving the Alfa Romeo Racing C38 at the Hungaroring. Pourchaire was listed as one of the contenders to fill the second seat at Alfa Romeo alongside Valtteri Bottas, but instead went to Zhou Guanyu. Alfa Romeo team boss Frédéric Vasseur stating that it was "too risky" to promote Pourchaire.

Pourchaire moved into a testing role with Alfa Romeo F1 Team for the 2022 season and took part in one Friday free practice session (FP1). He made his FP1 debut with Alfa Romeo at the 2022 United States Grand Prix, while also confirming that he would become the team's reserve driver for 2023. Pourchaire also participated in the post-season tests in Abu Dhabi.

Ahead of the 2023 Singapore Grand Prix, Alfa Romeo announced that Pourchaire would remain the reserve driver for 2024, as Valtteri Bottas and Zhou Guanyu had been retained. Following that, Pourchaire revealed that he was "very close" to signing with Alfa Romeo for 2024. Pourchaire partook in his first free practice session of 2023 at the Mexico City Grand Prix. However, he failed to set a competitive lap time after a brake-by-wire system that forced him out for most of the session. Pourchaire's second free practice session of the year came at the Abu Dhabi Grand Prix, where he ran the C43 in place of Zhou Guanyu. Pourchaire also took part in the young drivers' test with Alfa Romeo, ending 11th.

Despite being the reserve driver for 2024, Pourchaire did not take part in any practice sessions throughout the season. He was mentioned as an option to join the team in 2025, but the seats were eventually given to Nico Hülkenberg and 2024 Formula 2 champion Gabriel Bortoleto. At the end of the season, it was announced that Pourchaire would leave Sauber after graduating from the programme.

=== Mercedes (2026–present) ===
On 23 February 2026, it was announced that Pourchaire had joined Mercedes-AMG Petronas Formula One Team in a Development Driver role.

== Endurance racing career ==
=== 2024 ===
In November 2024, Pourchaire drove an endurance racing car for the first time, driving the Peugeot hypercar during the rookie test at the Bahrain International Circuit.

=== 2025: ELMS and Le Mans debut ===
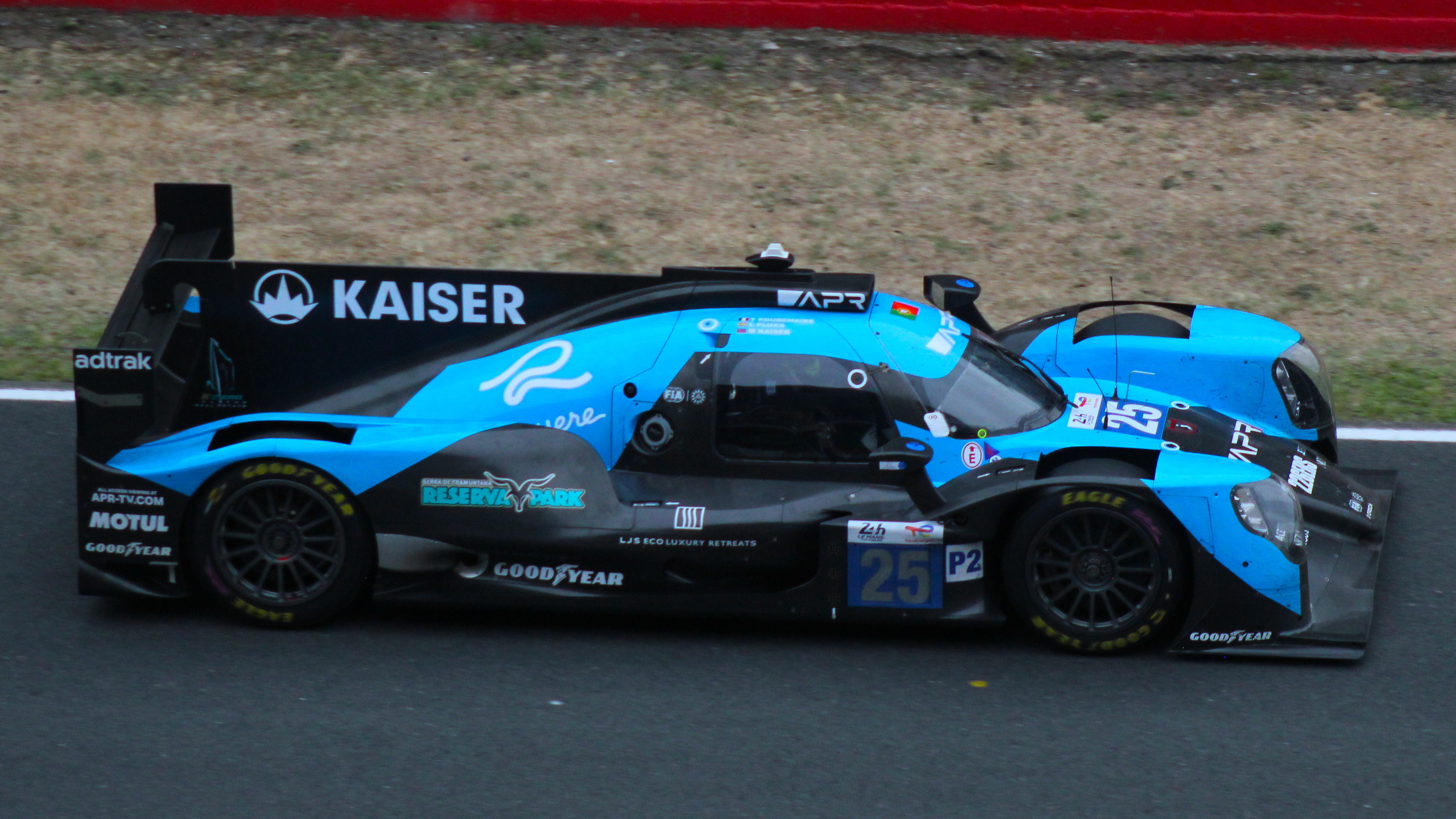
Pourchaire making his Le Mans debut in 2025.

Following the test, Pourchaire was named as a test and development driver for Peugeot for the 2025 FIA World Endurance Championship. In April, Pourchaire was announced to be driving for Algarve Pro Racing in the 2025 European Le Mans Series alongside Lorenzo Fluxá and Matthias Kaiser. After points finishes in the opening two rounds, Pourchaire secured his first pole position during the 4 Hours of Imola. They were unable to hold onto the lead and eventually finished third, nevertheless it marked Pourchaire's first endurance racing podium. This was their main highlight of the year, as the No. 25 car finished seventh in the standings.

Pourchaire also partook in the 24 Hours of Le Mans with Algarve Pro Racing. The team finished eighth in the LMP2 class. During the final race at the 8 Hours of Bahrain, Pourchaire replaced Stoffel Vandoorne at Peugeot, driving the No. 94 Peugeot 9X8. There, he led the race for two laps before handing over to Malthe Jakobsen, and the team eventually finished in tenth place.

=== 2026: WEC rookie season ===
Pourchaire's No. 94 9X8 during the 2026 6 Hours of Spa-Francorchamps.

In September 2025, Pourchaire was announced to be promoted as a full-time driver for Peugeot in the 2026 FIA World Endurance Championship.

During this season, Théo Pourchaire competed in the Hypercar category driving the No. 94 Peugeot 9X8 for Team Peugeot TotalEnergies alongside co-drivers Loïc Duval and Malthe Jakobsen. Across the eight rounds of the season, they gathered 24 points in the World Endurance Drivers' Championship standings, placing them 18th overall. There season was highlighted with a best result of 4th during the 6 Hours of Monza and a 11th place at the 24 Hours of Le Mans, 4 laps down the winner.

== IndyCar ==
=== Arrow McLaren stand-in (2024) ===
On 18 April 2024, Pourchaire substituted for the injured David Malukas at Grand Prix of Long Beach in the 2024 IndyCar Series for Arrow McLaren. Driving the No. 6 Chevrolet for the team, Pourchaire had a stellar debut, making up eleven positions from his starting position; the most of any driver on route to finish in eleventh place. Following the race, he stated that he "enjoyed it a lot" and "the racing in IndyCar is amazing". Pourchaire continued to deputise for Malukas at the Barber Motorsports Park, in which Arrow McLaren would release Malukas after Barber, due to an unclear recovery time. Pourchaire was signed days later for the remainder the season, bar the Indianapolis 500, forgoing his Super Formula commitments. He would finish that race in 22nd. At Detroit, Pourchaire qualified seventh, and finished in tenth place despite a penalty for contact with Agustín Canapino. Following the race, Pourchaire was subjected to abusive messages including death threats due to the contact with Canapino, which were condemned by IndyCar, Arrow McLaren and Canapino's team Juncos Hollinger Racing. Pourchaire was later released from Arrow McLaren and was replaced by Nolan Siegel. On July 19, McLaren gave Pourchaire another replacement appearance by letting him replace an injured Alexander Rossi in the Grand Prix of Toronto. He finished the race in 14th place.

== Formula E ==
In May 2022, Pourchaire revealed that he tested the new Formula E Gen3 car in early 2022. He completed three days of testing and commented that the car was "very good" and "very fast". Pourchaire was in contention for a Nissan Formula E seat for the 2022–23 season, before the team announced Norman Nato and Sacha Fenestraz for that season.

In February 2025, Maserati MSG Racing chose Pourchaire to partake in the rookie practice session at the Jeddah ePrix. He drove for Maserati once again during the Berlin rookie test at the Tempelhof Airport Street Circuit. In January 2026, Pourchaire was picked by Citroën Racing to drive during the rookie practice session at the Miami ePrix, and the rookie test for the Madrid ePrix.

=== Opel (2027–) ===
==== 2026–27 season ====
In August 2026, Opel GSE Formula E Team signed Pourchaire for the 2026–27 season.

== Personal life ==
Away from the track, Pourchaire relaxes himself by playing Call of Duty and Grand Theft Auto and is a big fan of the Star Wars saga. His favorite artist is Drake, having an interest in American music. He has stated that if he was not a racing driver, he would seek other work in the sports industry. He is also a big fan of Formula One champions Fernando Alonso and Michael Schumacher.

== Karting record ==
=== Karting career summary ===
Season	Series	Team	Position
2010	Championnat de France Regional PACAC — Mini Kart		5th
2010	Trophée Claude Secq — Mini Kart		**3rd**
2011	Championnat de France Regional PACAC — Mini Kart		**1st**
2011	Coupe de de France — Mini Kart		20th
2012	Championnat de France Regional PACAC — Minime		**1st**
2012	Championnat de France — Minime		**2nd**
2012	Coupe de de France — Minime		**2nd**
2012	Regional Series — Minime		9th
2012	Sens Trophy — Minime		**2nd**
2012	Julie Tonelli Trophy — Minime		**1st**
2012	Trophée Kart Mag — Minime		8th
2013	Championnat de France Regional Ile de France — Minime		**1st**
2013	Championnat de France — Minime		**1st**
2013	Coupe de de France — Minime		**1st**
2013	Trophée Interclub — Minime		**1st**
2014	Championnat de France Regional Ile de France — Cadet		**1st**
2014	Championnat de France — Cadet	Jana Racing	**1st**
2014	Coupe de de France — Cadet		32nd
2015	Championnat de France Regional PACAC — Cadet		**1st**
2015	Coupe de de France — Cadet		27th
2015	National Series Karting — Cadet		**1st**
2016	Championnat de France — OKJ		**1st**
2016	21° South Garda Winter Cup — OKJ		NC
2016	WSK Super Master Series — OKJ	Kosmic Racing Team	24th
2016	CIK-FIA European Championship — OKJ	Kosmic Racing Dept	17th
2016	WSK Final Cup — OKJ	Kosmic Racing Team	10th
2016	WSK Champions Cup — OKJ	Kosmic Racing Team	25th
2016	CIK-FIA World Championship — OKJ	Kosmic Racing Department	**3rd**
2016	German Junior Kart Championship	Kosmic Racing Department	4th
2017	Championnat de France — OK		**3rd**
2017	Coupe de France — OK		**3rd**
2017	22° South Garda Winter Cup — OK		**3rd**
2017	WSK Champions Cup — OK	Kosmic Racing Departement	19th
2017	WSK Super Master Series — OK	Kosmic Racing Departement	12th
2017	CIK-FIA European Championship	Kosmic Racing Departement	8th
2017	CIK-FIA World Championship — OK	Kosmic Racing Departement	NC
2017	Swedish Karting Championship — OK	Jana Racing	4th

=== Complete CIK-FIA Karting European Championship results ===
(key) (Races in bold indicate pole position) (Races in italics indicate fastest lap)

Year	Team	Class	1	2	3	4	5	6	7	8	9	10	11	12	DC	Points
2016	Kosmic Racing Department	OKJ	ZUE; QH; 29	ZUE; PF; 15	ZUE; R 22	ADR; QH; 29	ADR; PF; 12	ADR; R 10	PRT; QH; 18	PRT; PF; 22	PRT; R DNQ	GEN; QH; 5	GEN; PF; 5	GEN; R 12	17th	40
2017	Kosmic Racing Department	OK	SAR; QH; 1	**SAR**; **R** 1	CAY; QH; 45	CAY; R DNQ	LEM; QH; 2	LEM; R 27	ALA; QH; 10	ALA; R 10	KRI; QH; 9	KRI; R 14			8th	55

== Racing record ==
=== Racing career summary ===
Season	Series	Team	Races	Wins	Poles	F/Laps	Podiums	Points	Position
2018	French F4 Championship	FFSA Academy	21	1	0	1	7	203	**3rd**
2019	ADAC Formula 4 Championship	US Racing–CHRS	20	4	6	1	12	258	**1st**
2020	FIA Formula 3 Championship	ART Grand Prix	18	2	0	0	8	161	**2nd**
2020	FIA Formula 2 Championship	BWT HWA Racelab	4	0	0	0	0	0	26th
2021	FIA Formula 2 Championship	ART Grand Prix	23	2	1	3	3	140	5th
2022	FIA Formula 2 Championship	ART Grand Prix	28	3	0	0	7	164	**2nd**
2022	Formula One	Alfa Romeo F1 Team ORLEN	Test driver						
2023	FIA Formula 2 Championship	ART Grand Prix	26	1	2	2	10	203	**1st**
2023	Formula One	Alfa Romeo F1 Team Stake	Reserve driver						
2024	IndyCar Series	Arrow McLaren	6	0	0	0	0	91	28th
2024	Super Formula	Itochu Enex Team Impul	1	0	0	0	0	0	25th
2024	Formula One	Stake F1 Team Kick Sauber	Reserve driver						
2025	European Le Mans Series - LMP2	Algarve Pro Racing	6	0	1	0	1	40	7th
2025	24 Hours of Le Mans - LMP2	Algarve Pro Racing	1	0	0	0	0	N/A	8th
2025	FIA World Endurance Championship - Hypercar	Peugeot TotalEnergies	1	0	0	0	0	2	26th
2026	FIA World Endurance Championship - Hypercar	Peugeot TotalEnergies	8	0	1	0	0	24	18th
2026	Formula One	Mercedes-AMG Petronas F1 Team	Development driver						
2026–27	Formula E	Opel GSE Formula E Team	0	0	0	0	0	0	TBD

^{*} Season still in progress.

=== Complete French F4 Championship results ===
(key) (Races in bold indicate pole position; races in italics indicate fastest lap)

Year	Entrant	1	2	3	4	5	6	7	8	9	10	11	12	13	14	15	16	17	18	19	20	Pos	Points
2018	NOG; 1; 4	NOG; 2; 2	NOG; 3; 3	PAU; 1; 7	PAU; 2; 4	PAU; 3; 6	SPA; 1; 5	SPA; 2; 1	SPA; 3; 4	DIJ; 1; 4	DIJ; 2; 6	DIJ; 3; 8	MAG; 1; 2	MAG; 2 Ret	MAG; 3; 2	JER; 1; 4	JER; 2; 8	JER; 3; 10	LEC; 1; 2	LEC; 2; 10	LEC; 3; 3	3rd	203

=== Complete ADAC Formula 4 Championship results ===
(key) (Races in bold indicate pole position; races in italics indicate fastest lap)

Year	Entrant	1	2	3	4	5	6	7	8	9	10	11	12	13	14	15	16	17	18	19	20	Pos	Points
2019	US Racing-CHRS	OSC; 1; 5	OSC; 2; 2	OSC; 3; 10	RBR; 1; 12	RBR; 2; 1	RBR; 3; 3	**HOC**; **1**; 2	HOC; 2; 3	**ZAN**; **1**; 3	ZAN; 2; 3	ZAN; 3; 7	NÜR; 1; 1	**NÜR**; **2**; 1	NÜR; 3; 11	**HOC**; **1**; 14	HOC; 2; 12	HOC; 3; 6	**SAC**; **1**; 2	**SAC**; **2**; 1	SAC; 3; 2	1st	258

=== Complete FIA Formula 3 Championship results ===
(key) (Races in bold indicate pole position points) (Races in italics indicate fastest lap points for the fastest lap from top-10 finishers)

Year	Entrant	1	2	3	4	5	6	7	8	9	10	11	12	13	14	15	16	17	18	Pos	Points
2020	ART Grand Prix	RBR; FEA; 13	RBR; SPR; 26	RBR; FEA; 9‡	RBR; SPR; 1	HUN; FEA; 1	HUN; SPR; 6	SIL; FEA; 12	SIL; SPR; 8	SIL; FEA; 6	SIL; SPR; 3	CAT; FEA; 7	CAT; SPR; 6	SPA; FEA; 2	SPA; SPR; 5	MNZ; FEA; 2	MNZ; SPR; 2	MUG; FEA; 3	MUG; SPR; 3	**2nd**	161

^{‡} Half points awarded as less than 75% of race distance was completed.

=== Complete FIA Formula 2 Championship results ===
(key) (Races in bold indicate pole position) (Races in italics indicate points for the fastest lap of top ten finishers)

Year	Entrant	1	2	3	4	5	6	7	8	9	10	11	12	13	14	15	16	17	18	19	20	21	22	23	24	25	26	27	28	Pos	Points
2020	BWT HWA Racelab	RBR; FEA	RBR; SPR	RBR; FEA	RBR; SPR	HUN; FEA	HUN; SPR	SIL; FEA	SIL; SPR	SIL; FEA	SIL; SPR	CAT; FEA	CAT; SPR	SPA; FEA	SPA; SPR	MNZ; FEA	MNZ; SPR	MUG; FEA	MUG; SPR	SOC; FEA	SOC; SPR	BHR; FEA; 18	BHR; SPR; Ret	BHR; FEA; 18	BHR; SPR; 21					26th	0
2021	ART Grand Prix	BHR; SP1; Ret	BHR; SP2; 6	BHR; FEA; 8	MCO; SP1; 7	MCO; SP2; 4	**MCO**; **FEA**; 1	BAK; SP1; 5	BAK; SP2; 9	BAK; FEA; Ret	SIL; SP1; 5	SIL; SP2; 10	SIL; FEA; 8	MNZ; SP1; 1	MNZ; SP2; 10	MNZ; FEA; 4	SOC; SP1; 5	SOC; SP2; C	SOC; FEA; 2	JED; SP1; Ret	JED; SP2; 6	JED; FEA; Ret	YMC; SP1; 7	YMC; SP2; 9	YMC; FEA; 4					5th	140
2022	ART Grand Prix	BHR; SPR; Ret	BHR; FEA; 1	JED; SPR; 13	JED; FEA; Ret	IMO; SPR; 7	IMO; FEA; 1	CAT; SPR; 5	CAT; FEA; 8	MCO; SPR; 6	MCO; FEA; 2	BAK; SPR; 7	BAK; FEA; 11	SIL; SPR; 4	SIL; FEA; 2	RBR; SPR; 2	RBR; FEA; 13	LEC; SPR; 7	LEC; FEA; 2	HUN; SPR; 9	HUN; FEA; 1	SPA; SPR; 6	SPA; FEA; Ret	ZAN; SPR; 20	ZAN; FEA; 9	MNZ; SPR; 17	MNZ; FEA; Ret	YMC; SPR; 9	YMC; FEA; 19†	2nd	164
2023	ART Grand Prix	BHR; SPR; 5	**BHR**; **FEA**; 1	JED; SPR; Ret	JED; FEA; 13	MEL; SPR; 18†	MEL; FEA; 2	BAK; SPR; 15†	BAK; FEA; 3	MCO; SPR; 8	MCO; FEA; 2	CAT; SPR; 2	CAT; FEA; 7	RBR; SPR; 14	RBR; FEA; 7	SIL; SPR; 2	SIL; FEA; 3	HUN; SPR; 4	HUN; FEA; 6	SPA; SPR; 2	SPA; FEA; 2	ZAN; SPR; 19	ZAN; FEA; Ret	MNZ; SPR; 4	**MNZ**; **FEA**; 3	YMC; SPR; 7	YMC; FEA; 5			1st	203

=== Complete Formula One participations ===
(key) (Races in bold indicate pole position) (Races in italics indicate fastest lap)

Year	Entrant	Chassis	Engine	1	2	3	4	5	6	7	8	9	10	11	12	13	14	15	16	17	18	19	20	21	22	WDC	Points
2022	Alfa Romeo F1 Team ORLEN	Alfa Romeo C42	Ferrari 066/7 1.6 V6 t	BHR	SAU	AUS	EMI	MIA	ESP	MON	AZE	CAN	GBR	AUT	FRA	HUN	BEL	NED	ITA	SIN	JPN	USA; TD	MXC	SAP	ABU	–	–
2023	Alfa Romeo F1 Team Stake	Alfa Romeo C43	Ferrari 066/10 1.6 V6 t	BHR	SAU	AUS	AZE	MIA	MON	ESP	CAN	AUT	GBR	HUN	BEL	NED	ITA	SIN	JPN	QAT	USA	MXC; TD	SAP	LVG	ABU; TD	–	–

=== Complete Super Formula results ===
Year	Team	Engine	1	2	3	4	5	6	7	8	9	DC	Points
2024	Itochu Enex Team Impul	Toyota	SUZ; 18	AUT	SUG	FUJ	MOT	FUJ	FUJ	SUZ	SUZ	25th	0

=== American open-wheel racing results ===
==== IndyCar Series ====
Year	Team	No.	Chassis	Engine	1	2	3	4	5	6	7	8	9	10	11	12	13	14	15	16	17	18	Rank	Points	Ref
2024	Arrow McLaren	6	Dallara DW12	Chevrolet	STP	THE	LBH; 11	ALA; 22	IMS; 17	INDY	DET; 10	ROA; 13	LAG	MDO	IOW	IOW							28th	91	
2024	Arrow McLaren	7	Dallara DW12	Chevrolet													TOR; 14	GTW	POR	MIL	MIL	NSH	28th	91	

=== Complete European Le Mans Series results ===
(key) (Races in bold indicate pole position; results in italics indicate fastest lap)

Year	Entrant	Class	Chassis	Engine	1	2	3	4	5	6	Rank	Points
2025	Algarve Pro Racing	LMP2	Oreca 07	Gibson GK428 4.2 L V8	CAT; 5	LEC; 8	**IMO**; 3	SPA; 12	SIL; 5	ALG; Ret	7th	40

=== Complete 24 Hours of Le Mans results ===
Year	Team	Co-Drivers	Car	Class	Laps	Pos.	Class Pos.
2025	(Portugal) Algarve Pro Racing	(Spain) Lorenzo Fluxá (Liechtenstein) Matthias Kaiser	Oreca 07-Gibson	LMP2	364	25th	8th
2026	(France) Peugeot TotalEnergies	(France) Loïc Duval (Denmark) Malthe Jakobsen	Peugeot 9X8	Hypercar	377	11th	11th

=== Complete FIA World Endurance Championship results ===
(key) (Races in bold indicate pole position; races in italics indicate fastest lap)

Year	Entrant	Class	Car	Engine	1	2	3	4	5	6	7	8	Rank	Points
2025	Peugeot TotalEnergies	Hypercar	Peugeot 9X8	Peugeot X6H 2.6 L Turbo V6	QAT	IMO	SPA	LMS	SÃO	COA	FUJ	BHR; 10	26th	2
2026	Peugeot TotalEnergies	Hypercar	Peugeot 9X8	Peugeot X6H 2.6 L Turbo V6	IMO; 12	**SPA**; Ret	LMS; 10	SÃO; 14	COA; 10	FUJ; 6	CAT; 13	MNZ; 4	18th	24

Sporting positions
Preceded by Lirim Zendeli	ADAC Formula 4 Champion; 2019	Succeeded by Jonny Edgar
Preceded by Felipe Drugovich	FIA Formula 2 Championship; Champion; 2023	Succeeded by Gabriel Bortoleto
