= Dennis Hauger =

Norwegian racing driver (born 2003)

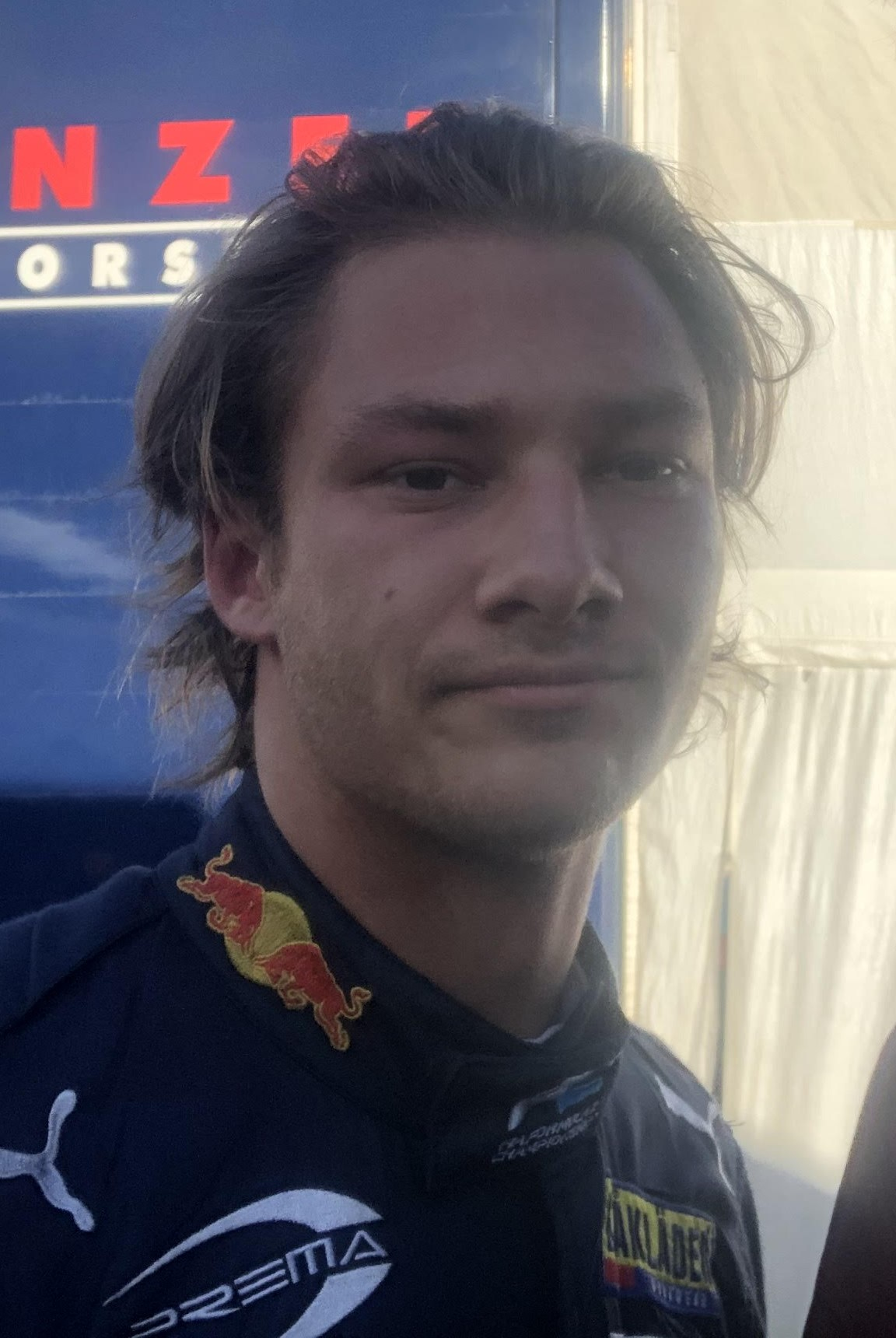
- Hauger at the 2022 Spielberg Formula 2 round.
- Nationality: (Norway) Norwegian
- Born: 17 March 2003 (age 23) Oslo, Norway
- Categorisation: FIA Gold

IndyCar Series career
- 18 races run over 1 year
- Team: No. 14 (A.J. Foyt Enterprises)
- Best finish: 22nd (2026)
- First race: 2026 Firestone Grand Prix of St. Petersburg
- Last race: 2026 Mission Grand Prix of Monterey (Laguna Seca)
Wins	Podiums	Poles
0	0	0

Previous series
- 2025; 2025; 2022–2024; 2020–2021; 2020; 2019; 2019; 2019; 2018: Indy NXT; Porsche Carrera Cup Scandinavia; FIA Formula 2; FIA Formula 3; FR European; Euroformula Open; ADAC F4; Italian F4; F4 British

Championship titles
- 2025; 2021; 2019: Indy NXT; FIA Formula 3; Italian F4

Awards
- 2026 2025: IndyCar Rookie of the Year; Indy NXT Rookie of the Year

Dennis Hauger (Norwegian pronunciation: [ˈdɛnɪs ˈhœʉ̯ː(ɡ)əɾ]; born 17 March 2003) is a Norwegian racing driver who is competing in the IndyCar Series. He will begin competing with A. J. Foyt Racing in 2027, having previously competed with Dale Coyne Racing. He competed in the 2025 Indy NXT with Andretti Global, winning the championship. He then won the 2026 IndyCar Series Rookie of the Year award.

Hauger raced in Formula 2 from 2022 to 2024. He was a member of the Red Bull Junior Team and was the 2021 FIA Formula 3 champion. Hauger also won the 2019 Italian F4 Championship with Van Amersfoort Racing.

== Early career ==
=== Karting ===
Hauger was born in Oslo and raised in Aurskog. His parents bought him a quad bike when he was two, and he started driving cross bikes at the age of four. He began his karting career at the age of five, winning his first race at the age of eight. After finishing 62 out of seventy national races on the podium the Norwegian moved into international competition in 2014. That year, Hauger claimed the ROK International title in the Mini category and followed it up the following year by claiming Mini category titles in the Vega Winter Trophy, the Italian CSAI Karting Championship and the WSK Champions Cup and Super Masters championships. In 2017, Hauger became the youngest ever champion to claim the DKM junior title and repeated this feat the following year to become the youngest DKM champion, until Harry Thompson claimed the title in 2018.

=== Lower formulae ===
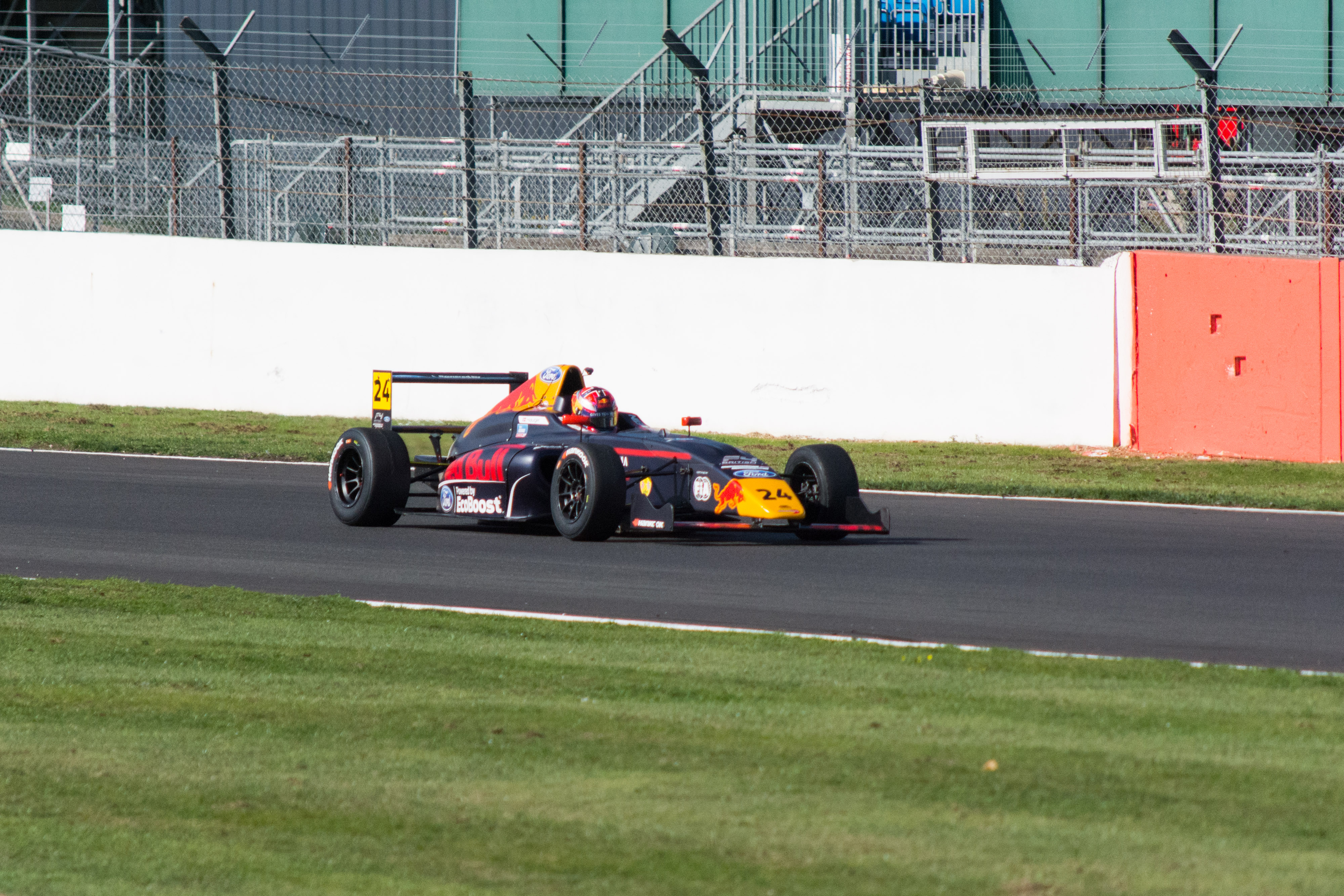
Hauger at Silverstone in 2018

In October 2017, Hauger and fellow Red Bull junior Jack Doohan were signed by the TRS Arden Junior Team to contest the 2018 F4 British Championship. Claiming four victories, Hauger ended the season fourth in the overall standings, but missed out on the Junior Championship to Doohan.

The following year, Hauger remained at Formula 4 level, but switched to Van Amersfoort Racing to contest the ADAC and Italian F4 championships. In the ADAC championship, Hauger claimed six victories, including one at the Formula One support race at the Hockenheimring, and finished as championship runner-up to Théo Pourchaire by only seven points.

Over in the Italian championship, Hauger scored twelve victories, including a weekend grand slam in the season finale at Monza, and sealed the title with a round to spare, being over 130 points ahead of fellow F1 junior drivers Gianluca Petecof of Ferrari and Paul Aron of Mercedes. His performances also helped Van Amersfoort Racing to win the team championship.

=== Euroformula Open Championship ===
In August 2019, Motopark announced Hauger would make his debut in the championship at Silverstone replacing Liam Lawson, having had to wait a round due to clashes with ADAC Formula 4 at the Red Bull Ring. The race weekend saw Hauger take a sixth place finish in the first race and a fifth place finish in the second race.

=== FIA Formula 3 Championship ===
==== 2020 ====
In October 2019, Hauger partook in the second and third days of post-season testing in Valencia with Hitech Grand Prix. In January 2020, Red Bull confirmed Hauger would race with the British outfit in the upcoming season together with fellow Red Bull junior Liam Lawson and Renault junior Max Fewtrell. Hauger's first FIA Formula 3 points came at the Hungaroring, where he finished eighth in the first race. This put him on reverse-grid pole position for the second race. He led much of the race but dropped back when the track began to dry, finishing third to claim his maiden FIA Formula 3 podium finish. Despite this result, Hauger would fail to score points at any of the remaining races, eventually finishing seventeenth in the championship with fourteen points.

In the post-season test at Catalunya, Hauger joined reigning team champions Prema Racing and consistently ran in the top ten across both testing days with a best placed finish of third in both afternoon sessions. Later that month, the Italian outfit once again fielded Hauger in the second post-season test at Jerez.

==== 2021 ====
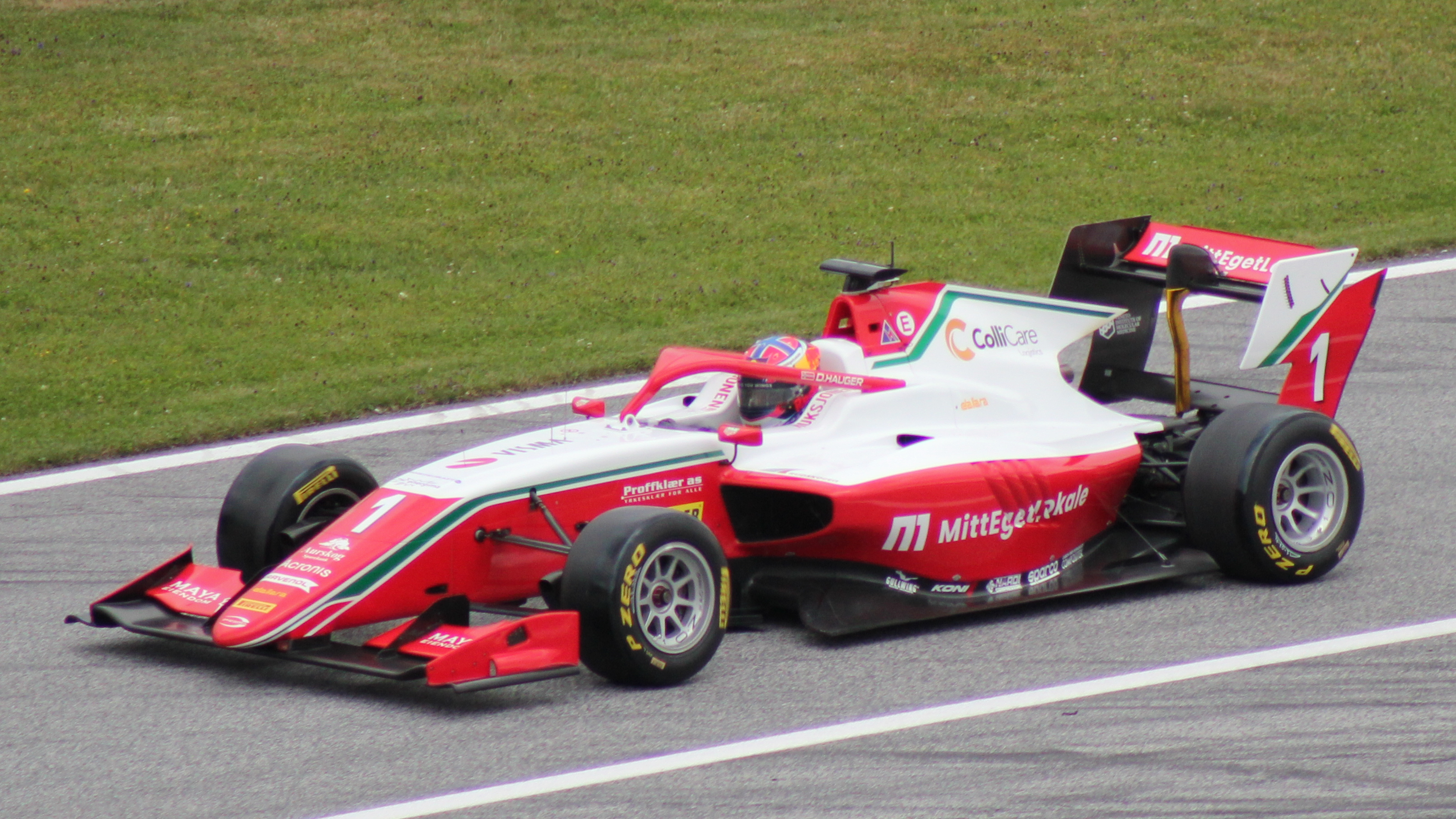
Hauger driving the Dallara F3 2019 during the 2021 Spielberg Formula 3 round

In December, Prema confirmed Hauger would race with them in the 2021 season, partnering Olli Caldwell and Ferrari Driver Academy member Arthur Leclerc. He scored his first pole position in the category at the first weekend in Barcelona, beating former British F4 rival Jack Doohan. Hauger fought for the lead of Race 2 with Matteo Nannini, however the two collided, breaking Hauger's front wing and dropping him to the back. He led the entirety of Race 3 to claim his first FIA Formula 3 race victory, and ended the first round leading the championship by two points over teammate Caldwell. Hauger took consecutive second-place finishes at the Circuit Paul Ricard before taking pole position at the Red Bull Ring and finishing all three races on the podium, including a victory in Race 1 after starting 12th. After the third round, his championship lead had extended to a margin of 41 points, and Hauger extended that gap to 63 points after winning a wet-weather race at the Hungaroring. Following a round at Spa-Francorchamps in which he only scored six points however, his title rival Jack Doohan was able to bridge the gap between the two going into the penultimate round of the season. Hauger lost a chance at a podium finish three laps from the end of race two at Zandvoort due to a collision with Ido Cohen, but he was able to bounce back in the final race, extending his gap once again with his fourth win of the year. In the first race of the final round at the Sochi Autodrom, Hauger came up from fourth on the grid to take second, thus becoming the 2021 Formula 3 Champion with two races to spare. After the race, he stated that he had "started questioning [himself]" the previous season, but that his doubts were eradicated following his move to Prema.

Following the season finale, Hauger drove an F3 development car in a tyre test in Barcelona, completing 123 laps on a dry track, with the goals of the session being to make racing in F3 more demanding, as well as developing the tyres to help the teams for the following season.

=== FIA Formula 2 Championship ===
==== 2022 ====
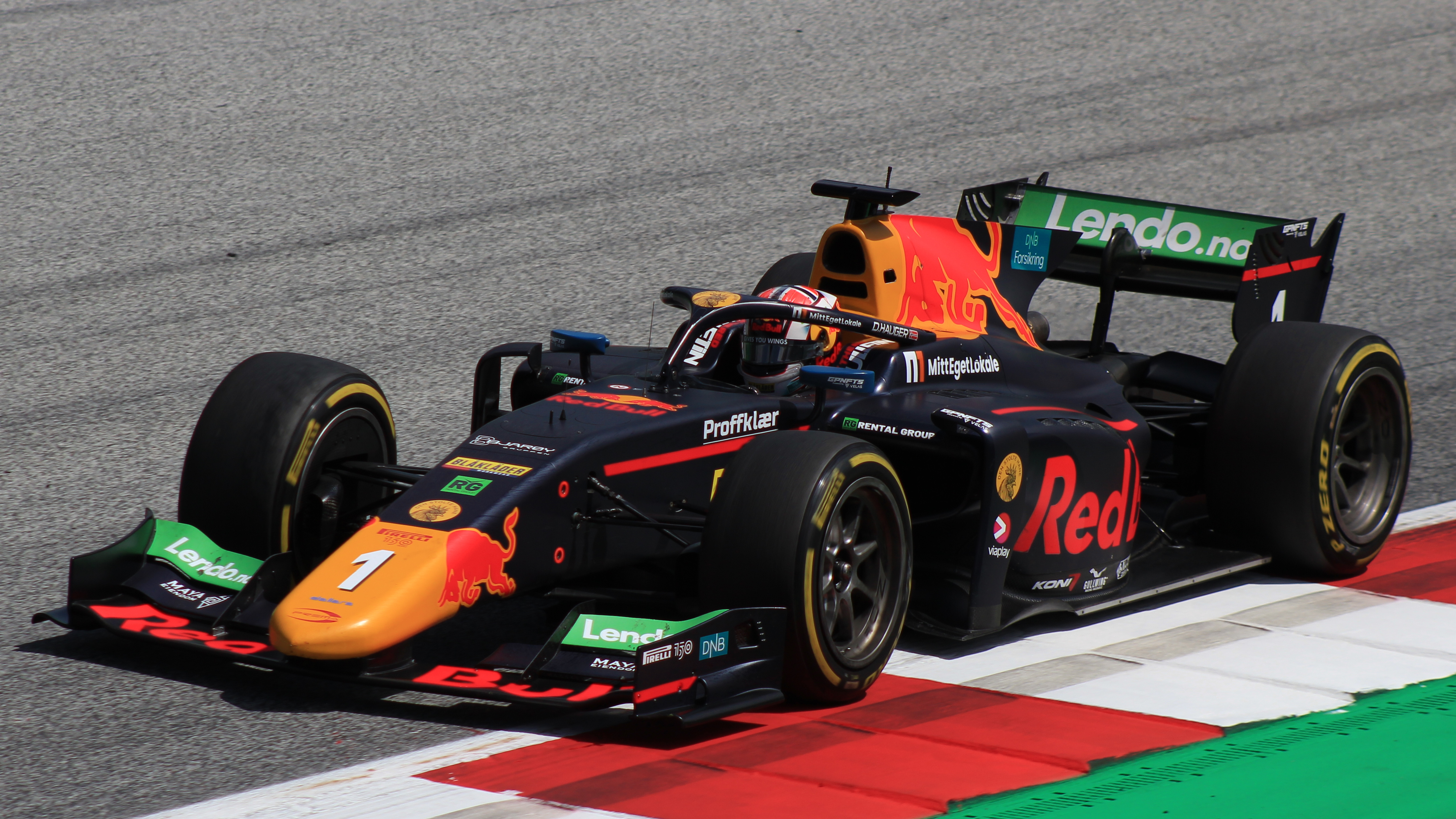
Hauger driving the Dallara F2 2018 during the 2022 Spielberg Formula 2 round

Having tested with the team at the end of 2021, Hauger announced on 14 January that he would be partnering Jehan Daruvala at Prema Racing in Formula 2. Qualifying 15th for the Bahrain opener and narrowly missing points in the sprint, he ran in the points but retired after a faulty pit stop resulted in a tyre detaching from his car. Hauger started on reverse grid pole for the Jeddah sprint race and lead the early laps, but a safety car miscommunication invoked a ten-second stop-and-go penalty, causing him to finish down in 16th place. Hauger scored his first points of the season in the feature race with sixth place. Hauger's Imola weekend was bittersweet; he scored his maiden Formula 2 podium after finishing third in the Sprint Race, but was involved in an early collision with Jack Doohan that saw his Feature Race over after three turns. His weekend in Barcelona was uneventful; he qualified fourteenth and finished twelfth in the Sprint Race and thirteenth in the Feature Race. In Monaco, Hauger led from start to finish in the sprint race to score his maiden F2 victory. In the feature race, he made up four places at the start to fifth, but a safety car compromised his pit strategy and he dropped to seventh.

Hauger had an improved qualifying in Baku with third. His race ended after a failed overtake resulted in a crash into the wall, but he redeemed himself by winning his first feature race the next day, inheriting the lead after Jüri Vips crashed out. He failed to score in Silverstone as he was involved in a collision on the opening lap of the feature race with Roy Nissany. In Austria, he qualified in fifteenth position, and finished ninth in the sprint. During the feature Race starting on slick tyres, he passed multiple drivers who were on wets as the track dried; he eventually finished fourth after post-race penalties. Hauger qualified eighteenth in France due to a fuel pump failure, and failed to score points in the races. Hauger's poor form continued in Hungary despite a top-ten qualifying finish, as he was eliminated on the opening lap of the sprint and struggled with tyre degradation on route to nineteenth in the feature race. Hauger's pointless run continued in Spa-Francorchamps after a penalty in the feature race deprived him of points.

Hauger qualified seventh in Zandvoort; he passed Vips on the opening lap of the sprint and held third position for the remainder of the race, scoring his first podium since Baku. He finished fourth in the feature race. He had a poor qualifying in Monza, but had the pace to make up ten places to finish ninth in the sprint race. In the feature race, he made up fifteen places to finish fourth in an incident-packed race, despite having to serve a drive-through penalty at the start. He also had to serve a drive-through penalty in the early part of the race for his team's failure to fit his wheels at the three minute signal before the start. In the final race weekend of the season in Abu Dhabi, he put on a strong showing by qualifying seventh on the grid. Qualifying seventh for season finale in Abu Dhabi, Hauger finished fourth in the sprint race with a last lap pass on Amaury Cordeel, and replicated this result in the feature race.

Hauger placed tenth in the overall standings with 115 points, scoring one win and four podiums.

==== 2023 ====
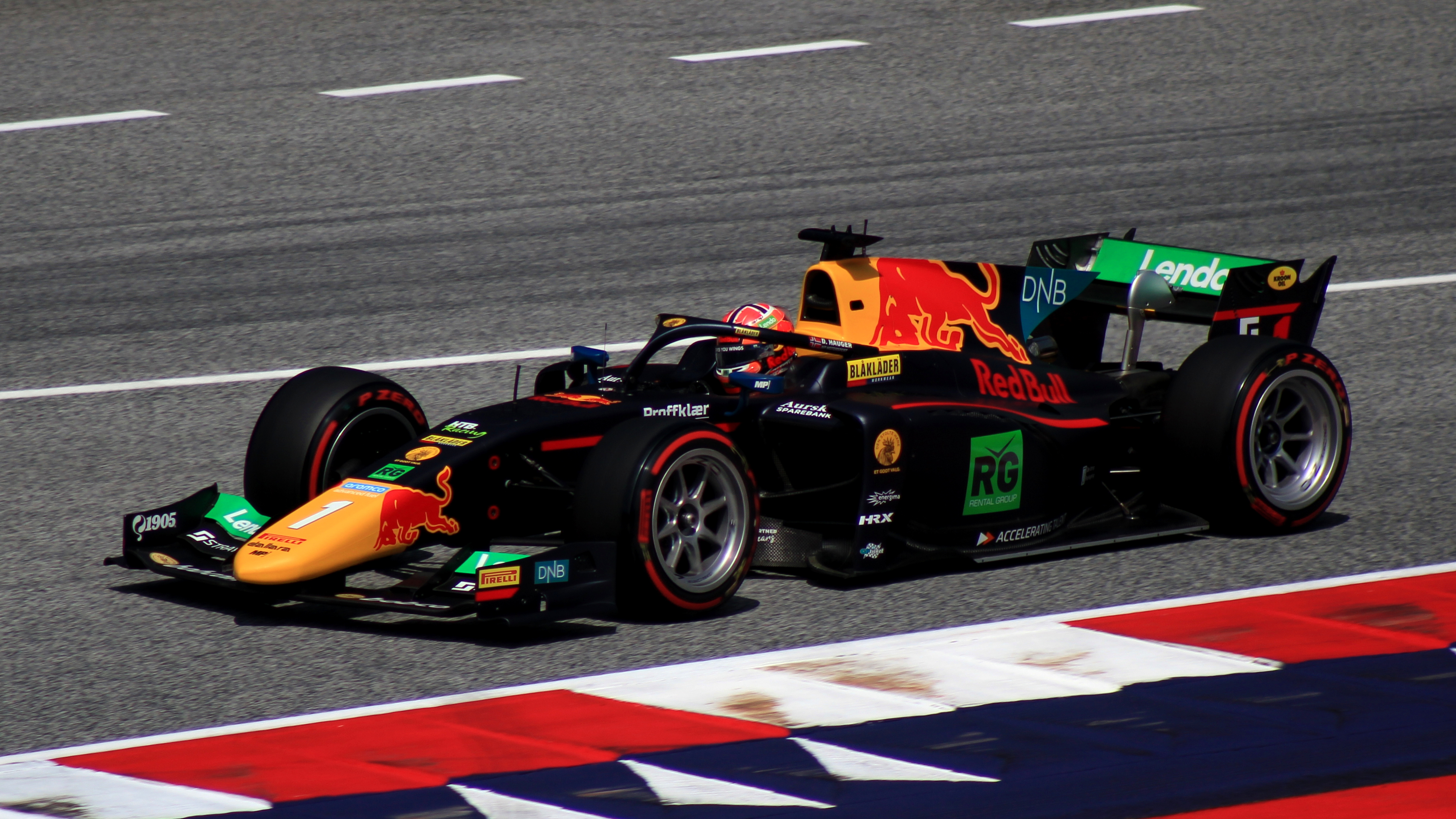
Hauger driving for MP Motorsport during the 2023 Spielberg Formula 2 round

Hauger moved to MP Motorsport for the 2023 Formula 2 Championship, still having Daruvala as his teammate. Qualifying fourth for the opening Bahrain round, he made an electric charge in the sprint race, mastering tyre wear and taking second place. An engine issue in the feature race saw Hauger lapped by the field, before ultimately retiring on lap sixteen. In Jeddah, Hauger qualified fourteenth, but moved his way up to eighth and a single point in the sprint race. He had a better feature race, securing fifth. In Melbourne, Hauger qualified tenth due to a red flag. However, he claimed victory during the sprint race from reverse pole under overcast conditions. The Norwegian was set for another podium finish on Sunday, but was punted from behind by Victor Martins during a late safety car restart. Hauger qualified fifth in Baku. He stormed into the lead of the sprint race until a late safety car restart, where on cold tyres, he crashed out at turn one with a handful of laps remaining. In the feature race, Hauger finished in sixth place.

A red flag in qualifying left Hauger in seventeenth for Monaco, and he finished fifteenth in the sprint race. During the feature race still yet to pit, whilst running seventh, a timed red flag from a crash allowed him to switch tyres, he would cross the line in fifth place, continuing his record of scoring in every round. Hauger qualified in sixth for Spain. He managed to secure fourth place in a wet sprint race, losing the final podium spot to Théo Pourchaire late in the race. In the feature race, Hauger lost out to some rivals on the alternate strategy, but secured an eighth place. In Austria, Hauger finished in sixth place, scoring his only points of the weekend. Silverstone was the first round where he failed to score any points, being involved in safety car restart incident during the feature race.

Looking to rebound from a difficult double header, Hauger qualified ninth in Hungary. He passed reverse polesitter Kush Maini and controlled for his second win of the year. In the feature race, Hauger made up more positions and finished in seventh. In Spa-Francorchamps, he qualified in sixth, and from there he would move up to fourth in the sprint race. However, second-placed Richard Verschoor was disqualified, promoting Hauger to the podium places. In the feature race, Hauger had a slow start, before his race was ruined after he was collected by Ayumu Iwasa spinning. He retired, but was later disqualified due to illegally bump starting his car as he ran for several more laps.

Hauger qualified on the front row in Zandvoort. In the feature race, he was unlucky to pit before the safety car, in which he lost positions and finished in fifth place. In Monza, a mistake in the sprint race from eighth costed him points as he dropped to twelfth. Despite that, Hauger was able to finish fifth in the feature race in a dramatic race. In Yas Marina, he ended his sophomore campaign positively, passing Isack Hadjar for fourth on the last lap in the sprint, and seventh place in the feature. Hauger ended the year eighth in the drivers' standings with 113 points, two wins and two podiums.

2023 Macau Grand Prix

In November, Hauger replaced an injured Franco Colapinto at MP Motorsport for the Macau Grand Prix. Despite his late call-up, Hauger impressed brilliantly, finishing in second during the main race.

==== 2024 ====
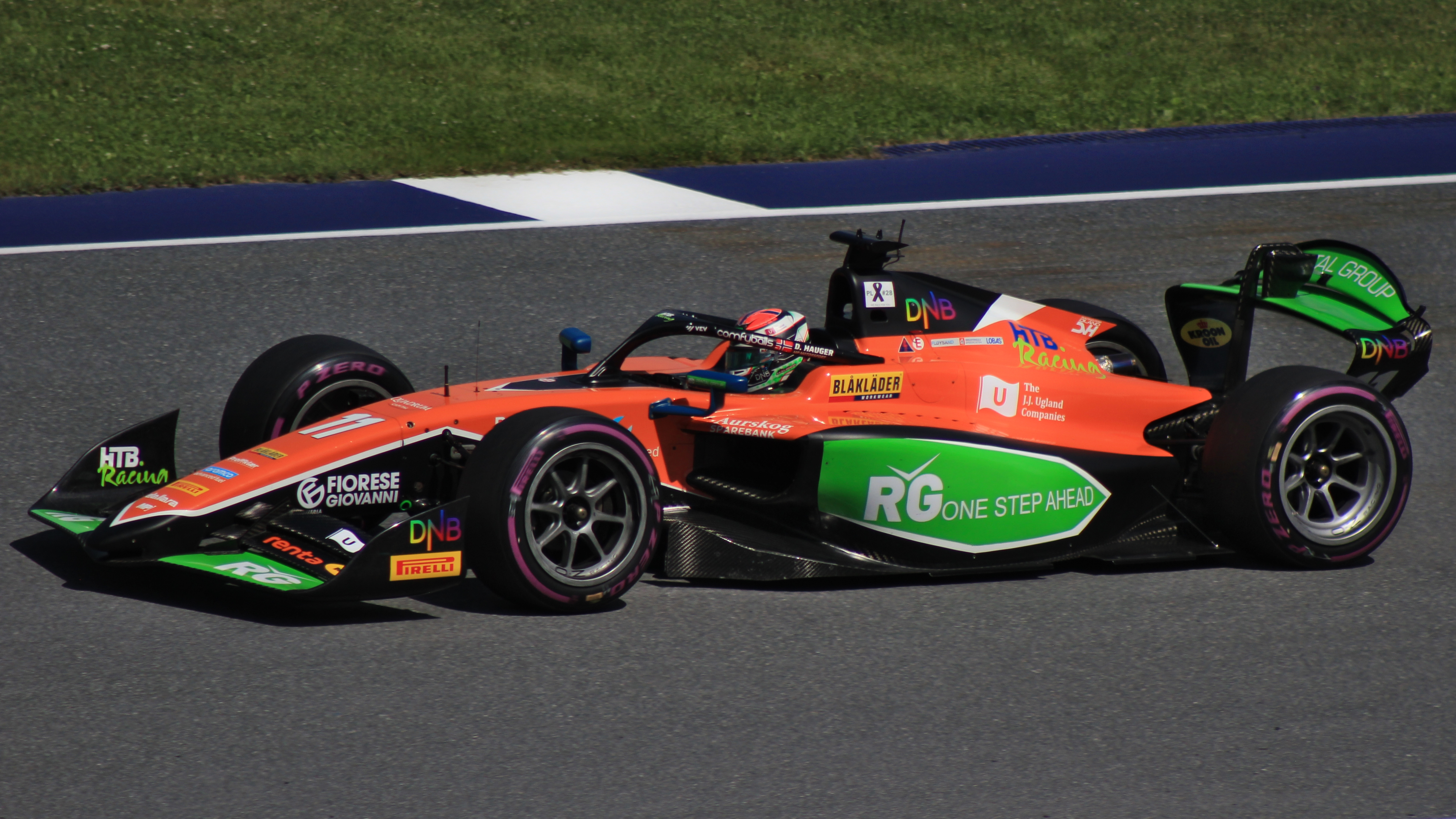
Hauger driving the Dallara F2 2024 during the 2024 Spielberg Formula 2 round

Hauger remained in Formula 2 for a third successive season in 2024, continuing his relationship with MP Motorsport alongside Williams Driver Academy member Franco Colapinto. Hauger began the season with two eighth-places in Bahrain, and earned his first rostrum of the season during the Jeddah sprint race; this was later upgraded to the race win after original winner Richard Verschoor was disqualified. His feature race was just as impressive, as he made a double overtake on Amaury Cordeel and Jak Crawford on the last lap to snatch third place. He continued his momentum with a maiden pole position in Melbourne. His podium streak continued in the sprint race as he took advantage of multiple incidents to finish in second. He looked set for another victory leading in the feature race, but crashed out on his own mid-race. After a disastrous weekend in Imola, Hauger returned to the podium again during the Monaco sprint race, holding third place from start to finish. He took a sixth place in the feature race.

Hauger had a non-scoring round in Barcelona after being eliminated in a collision with Victor Martins during the feature race. Despite this setback, he managed to claim his second pole next time out in Austria. He placed in fifth during the sprint despite a last lap contact with teammate Colapinto. Hauger's horrid luck continued in the feature race as he stalled on the formation lap, and was forced to start from the pits; he only recovered to twelfth. Hauger qualified in the top three in Silverstone, taking a seventh and ninth place finish in the races. In a red-flagged Spa-Francorchamps sprint race, Hauger scored his fifth podium of the season in second place under wet conditions, but could not hold onto points during the feature race. Hauger qualified fourth in Monza, and tied Gabriel Bortoleto for eighth place on the line in the sprint race. However, Hauger's bad luck continued in the feature, being taken out in a collision with Ritomo Miyata. Ahead of the Qatar round, Hauger opted to leave Formula 2 to focus on his Indy NXT preparation for 2025, and was replaced by Richard Verschoor. He eventually finished eleventh in the standings, with one win, two poles, five podiums and 85.5 points.

=== Formula One ===
In September 2017, Hauger was named as one of four new signings to the Red Bull Junior Team. He was announced as one of four reserve drivers for the Red Bull Racing Formula One team in 2023. In October 2023, Hauger announced that he would split with Red Bull following the end of 2023 after six years with the team. Speaking about his departure, Hauger revealed that he would not be retained as early as July and accepted "the brutal nature of such decisions".

=== Formula E ===
Hauger drove for the TAG Heuer Porsche Formula E Team during the 2024 Formula E Berlin rookie test, thus making his debut in Formula E machinery. He also drove for Andretti during the rookie free practice session of the 2026 Miami ePrix.

=== Indy NXT ===
In 2025, Hauger switched to racing in America in the Indy NXT with Andretti Global, after spending three years in Formula 2. Speaking about his move to the States, Hauger revealed that he had offers to stay in F2 but it "didn't really make sense to do another year".

Upon moving from Europe to America compete in Indy NXT in 2025, Hauger had to learn all the series’ tracks from scratch, which he has described as a significant part of his adaptation to American open-wheel racing.

Hauger had a dominant start to his campaign in St. Petersburg where he took pole in his maiden race, before controlling the race as he secured a first lights-to-flag victory. He would continue his form in race two at Barber, qualifying on pole for a second race in a row. Hauger would once again lead the race from start to finish, grabbing his second win in the series. Exiting Barber, Hauger built a championship lead of thirty points ahead of his teammate Lochie Hughes in second.

Going into the next two races at Indianapolis, Hauger looked to continue his form, topping the times of the only practice session of the weekend. In qualifying, he was beaten by teammate Hughes to pole by just 0.0695 of a second, ending Hauger's run of pole positions. At the start of race one, Hauger entered turn one three wide and made contact with Callum Hedge into the corner. Hauger ultimately had to take the escape road and fell down to last in the field. For the rest of the race, he would make his way back up the pack, to tenth, before a caution was displayed for a crash in front of him. James Roe made contact with the wall in the final corner and collected ninth place runner Nikita Johnson. Both drivers later retired, and Hauger inherited those two positions which moved him up to eighth place. Following the restart, Hauger attempted to gain more positions, but to no avail, and would finish the race in eighth. Teammate Hughes had won the race from pole, and his result narrowed the points gap between the two to just three points advantage Hauger. However, Hauger returned to form in the second race. He passed Hughes for the lead after an early caution and went on to take his third win, extending the points gap to fifteen.

== IndyCar ==
=== Dale Coyne Racing (2026) ===
==== 2026 season ====
In September 2025, after winning the Indy NXT title, Hauger made his IndyCar debut in 2026 with Dale Coyne Racing. Hauger will become the first Norwegian IndyCar driver in 109 years after the only other Norwegian IndyCar driver Gil Andersen who competed in the Indianapolis 500 from 1911 until 1916.

At the opening St. Petersburg round, Hauger qualified in third after making the Fast 6 on his debut.

=== A. J. Foyt Racing (2027–) ===
On September 16, 2026, A. J. Foyt Racing announced that they had signed Hauger on a multi-year deal to drive car No. 14, beginning with the 2027 season.

== Personal life ==
Hauger has carried a lucky amulet, which he received from his grandmother, around his neck since he started competing in international karting competitions.

== Karting record ==
=== Karting career summary ===
Season	Series	Team	Position
2014	WSK Champions Cup — 60 Mini	Gamoto Racing	10th
2014	Italian Championship — 60 Mini	Gamoto Racing	**2nd**
2014	WSK Master Series — 60 Mini	Gamoto Racing	6th
2014	Mini ROK International Final — Bridgestone Final	Gamoto Racing	**1st**
2014	WSK Final Cup — 60 Mini	NMK Trögstad	5th
2015	Vega International Winter Trophy — 60 Mini	Gamoto SNC	**1st**
2015	WSK Champions Cup — 60 Mini	Gamoto SNC	**1st**
2015	WSK Gold Cup — 60 Mini	Gamoto SNC	**1st**
2015	WSK Super Master Series — 60 Mini	Gamoto SNC	**1st**
2015	WSK Night Edition — 60 Mini	Gamoto SNC	**3rd**
2015	Italian Championship — 60 Mini		**1st**
2015	SKUSA SuperNationals — TaG Junior	Team CRG	33rd
2016	WSK Champions Cup — OKJ	CRG SpA	NC
2016	South Garda Winter Cup — OKJ	CRG SpA	5th
2016	WSK Super Master Series — OKJ	CRG SpA	7th
2016	CIK-FIA European Championship — OKJ	CRG SpA	4th
2016	German Karting Championship — Junior	CRG SpA	**1st**
2016	WSK Final Cup — OKJ	CRG SpA	7th
2016	IAME International Final — X30 Junior	CRG SpA	15th
2016	CIK-FIA World Championship — OKJ	CRG SpA	17th
2017	WSK Champions Cup — OK	CRG SpA	NC
2017	South Garda Winter Cup — OK	CRG SpA	**2nd**
2017	Andrea Margutti Trophy — OK	CRG SpA	12th
2017	WSK Super Master Series — OK	CRG SpA	18th
2017	German Karting Championship — Senior	CRG SpA	**1st**
2017	CIK-FIA European Championship — OK	CRG SpA	7th
2017	CIK-FIA World Championship — OK	CRG SpA	43rd

=== Complete CIK-FIA Karting European Championship results ===
(key) (Races in bold indicate pole position) (Races in italics indicate fastest lap)

Year	Team	Class	1	2	3	4	5	6	7	8	9	10	11	12	DC	Points
2016	CRG SpA	OKJ	ZUE; QH; 19	ZUE; PF; 7	ZUE; R 10	ADR; QH; 1	ADR; PF; 1	**ADR**; **R** 6	PRT; QH; 12	PRT; PF; 4	PRT; R 4	GEN; QH; 3	GEN; PF; 2	GEN; R 6	4th	98
2017	CRG SpA	OK	SAR; QH; 18	SAR; R 11	CAY; QH; 10	CAY; R 27	LEM; QH; 1	**LEM**; **R** 4	ALA; QH; 4	ALA; R 31	KRI; QH; 3	KRI; R 4			7th	57

=== Complete Karting World Championship results ===
Year	Team	Class	Prefinals	Main classification
2016	(Italy) CRG SpA	OKJ	10th	17th

== Racing record ==
=== Racing career summary ===
Season	Series	Team	Races	Wins	Poles	F/Laps	Podiums	Points	Position
2018	F4 British Championship	TRS Arden Junior Racing Team	30	4	4	4	10	329	4th
2019	ADAC Formula 4 Championship	Van Amersfoort Racing	20	6	5	8	10	251	**2nd**
2019	Italian F4 Championship	Van Amersfoort Racing	21	12	7	9	16	369	**1st**
2019	Euroformula Open Championship	Motopark	2	0	0	0	0	18	19th
2020	FIA Formula 3 Championship	Hitech Grand Prix	18	0	0	0	1	14	17th
2020	Formula Regional European Championship	Van Amersfoort Racing	8	1	2	1	6	134	7th
2020	Porsche Carrera Cup Scandinavia	Mtech Competition	5	0	1	0	4	0	NC†
2021	FIA Formula 3 Championship	Prema Racing	20	4	3	4	9	205	**1st**
2022	FIA Formula 2 Championship	Prema Racing	28	2	0	3	4	115	10th
2022	Porsche Carrera Cup Scandinavia	Porsche Experience Racing	5	0	0	1	1	61	12th
2023	FIA Formula 2 Championship	MP Motorsport	26	2	0	1	4	113	8th
2023	Macau Grand Prix	MP Motorsport	1	0	0	0	1	N/A	**2nd**
2023	Porsche Carrera Cup Scandinavia	Porsche Experience Racing	4	0	0	1	3	58	12th
2023	Formula One	Oracle Red Bull Racing	Reserve driver						
2024	FIA Formula 2 Championship	MP Motorsport	24	1	2	2	5	85.5	11th
2024	Porsche Carrera Cup Scandinavia	Porsche Experience Racing	2	2	1	1	2	0	NC†
2025	Indy NXT	Andretti Global	14	6	8	5	11	599	**1st**
2025	Porsche Carrera Cup Scandinavia	Porsche Experience Racing	2	2	0	0	2	0	NC†
2026	IndyCar Series	Dale Coyne Racing	18	0	0	0	0	228	22nd

^{†} As Hauger was a guest driver, he was ineligible to score points.
^{*} Season still in progress.

=== Complete F4 British Championship results ===
(key) (Races in bold indicate pole position) (Races in italics indicate fastest lap)

Year	Team	1	2	3	4	5	6	7	8	9	10	11	12	13	14	15	16	17	18	19	20	21	22	23	24	25	26	27	28	29	30	Pos	Points
2018	TRS Arden Junior Racing Team	BRI; 1; 3	BRI; 2; 7	BRI; 3; 9	DON; 1; 4	DON; 2; 3	DON; 3; 10	**THR**; **1** Ret	THR; 2; 6	**THR**; **3**; 3	OUL; 1; 1	OUL; 2; 6	OUL; 3; 5	**CRO**; **1**; 1	CRO; 2; 3	**CRO**; **3**; 1	SNE; 1; 1	SNE; 2; 6	SNE; 3; 2	ROC; 1; 3	ROC; 2; 5	ROC; 3 Ret	KNO; 1; 7	KNO; 2; 5	KNO; 3; 4	SIL; 1; 4	SIL; 2; 5	SIL; 3; 4	BHGP; 1; 7	BHGP; 2; 7	BHGP; 3; 11	4th	329

=== Complete Italian F4 Championship results ===
(key) (Races in bold indicate pole position) (Races in italics indicate fastest lap)

Year	Team	1	2	3	4	5	6	7	8	9	10	11	12	13	14	15	16	17	18	19	20	21	22	Pos	Points
2019	Van Amersfoort Racing	VLL; 1; 21	VLL; 2; 10	VLL; 3; 11	MIS; 1; 2	MIS; 2; 1	MIS; 3 C	**HUN**; **1**; 1	**HUN**; **2**; 1	**HUN**; **3**; 2	RBR; 1; 5	RBR; 2; 1	RBR; 3; 2	IMO; 1; 1	IMO; 2; 3	IMO; 3; 1	IMO; 4; 1	**MUG**; **1**; 11	**MUG**; **2**; 1	**MUG**; **3**; 1	**MNZ**; **1**; 1	MNZ; 2; 1	MNZ; 3; 1	1st	369

=== Complete ADAC Formula 4 Championship results ===
(key) (Races in bold indicate pole position) (Races in italics indicate fastest lap)

Year	Team	1	2	3	4	5	6	7	8	9	10	11	12	13	14	15	16	17	18	19	20	Pos	Points
2019	Van Amersfoort Racing	OSC; 1; 3	**OSC**; **2**; 14	OSC; 3; 15	**RBR**; **1**; 1	**RBR**; **2**; 14	RBR; 3; 21	HOC; 1; 1	HOC; 2; 2	ZAN; 1; 9	ZAN; 2; 17	ZAN; 3; 6	**NÜR**; **1** Ret	NÜR; 2; 5	NÜR; 3; 2	HOC; 1; 1	**HOC**; **2**; 1	HOC; 3; 1	SAC; 1; 4	SAC; 2; 2	SAC; 3; 1	2nd	251

=== Complete Euroformula Open Championship results ===
(key) (Races in bold indicate pole position) (Races in italics indicate fastest lap)

Year	Team	1	2	3	4	5	6	7	8	9	10	11	12	13	14	15	16	17	18	Pos	Points
2019	Motopark	LEC; 1	LEC; 2	PAU; 1	PAU; 2	HOC; 1	HOC; 2	SPA; 1	SPA; 2	HUN; 1	HUN; 2	RBR; 1	RBR; 2	SIL; 1; 6	SIL; 2; 5	CAT; 1	CAT; 2	MNZ; 1	MNZ; 2	19th	18

=== Complete Formula Regional European Championship results ===
(key) (Races in bold indicate pole position) (Races in italics indicate fastest lap)

Year	Team	1	2	3	4	5	6	7	8	9	10	11	12	13	14	15	16	17	18	19	20	21	22	23	24	Pos	Points
2020	Van Amersfoort Racing	MIS; 1	MIS; 2	MIS; 3	LEC; 1	LEC; 2	LEC; 3	RBR; 1	RBR; 2	RBR; 3	MUG; 1	MUG; 2	MUG; 3	MNZ; 1	MNZ; 2	MNZ; 3	CAT; 1; 3	**CAT**; **2**; 2	**CAT**; **3**; 2	IMO; 1; 2	IMO; 2; 4	IMO; 3; 5	VLL; 1; 1	VLL; 2 C	VLL; 3; 2	7th	134

=== Complete Macau Grand Prix results ===
Year	Team	Car	Qualifying	Quali Race	Main race
2023	(Netherlands) MP Motorsport	Dallara F3 2019	8th	5th	**2nd**

=== Complete FIA Formula 3 Championship results ===
(key) (Races in bold indicate pole position; races in italics indicate points for the fastest lap of top ten finishers)

Year	Entrant	1	2	3	4	5	6	7	8	9	10	11	12	13	14	15	16	17	18	19	20	21	DC	Points
2020	Hitech Grand Prix	RBR; FEA; 15	RBR; SPR; 22	RBR; FEA; 18	RBR; SPR; 12	HUN; FEA; 8	HUN; SPR; 3	SIL; FEA; 16	SIL; SPR; 17	SIL; FEA; Ret	SIL; SPR; 20	CAT; FEA; 18	CAT; SPR; 26	SPA; FEA; 15	SPA; SPR; 19	MNZ; FEA; 12	MNZ; SPR; 15	MUG; FEA; 14	MUG; SPR; 12				17th	14
2021	Prema Racing	CAT; 1; 8	CAT; 2; 25	**CAT**; **3**; 1	LEC; 1; 9	LEC; 2; 2	LEC; 3; 2	RBR; 1; 1	RBR; 2; 3	**RBR**; **3**; 2	HUN; 1; 5	HUN; 2; 5	HUN; 3; 1	SPA; 1; 14	SPA; 2; 9	SPA; 3; 8	ZAN; 1; 7	ZAN; 2; 27†	**ZAN**; **3**; 1	SOC; 1; 2	SOC; 2 C	SOC; 3; 24	1st	205

^{†} Driver did not finish the race, but was classified as they completed more than 90% of the race distance.

=== Complete Porsche Carrera Cup Scandinavia results ===
(key) (Races in bold indicate pole position) (Races in italics indicate fastest lap)

Year	Team	1	2	3	4	5	6	7	8	9	10	11	12	13	14	DC	Points
2020	Mtech Competition	FAL; 1	FAL; 2	SKE; 1	SKE; 2	KAR; 1	KAR; 2	AND; 1; 3	AND; 2; 3	AND; 3; 3	MAN; 1	MAN; 2	MAN; 3	KNU; 1	KNU; 2	NC†	0
2022	Porsche Experience Racing	AND1; 1	AND1; 2	SKE; 1; 2	SKE; 2; 14	SKE; 3 DNS	AND2; 1	AND2; 2	KAR; 1	KAR; 2	RUD; 1; 5	RUD; 2; 5	RUD; 3; 4	MAN; 1	MAN; 2	12th	61
2023	Porsche Experience Racing	AND1; 1	AND1; 2	LMS; 1 Ret	SKE1; 1	SKE1; 2	SKE2; 1	SKE2; 2	KAR; 1	KAR; 2	RUD; 1; 2	RUD; 2; 2	RUD; 3; 3	MAN; 1	MAN; 2	12th	58

^{†} As Hauger was a guest driver, he was ineligible to score points.

=== Complete FIA Formula 2 Championship results ===
(key) (Races in bold indicate pole position) (Races in italics indicate points for the fastest lap of top ten finishers)

Year	Entrant	1	2	3	4	5	6	7	8	9	10	11	12	13	14	15	16	17	18	19	20	21	22	23	24	25	26	27	28	DC	Points
2022	Prema Racing	BHR; SPR; 9	BHR; FEA; 19†	JED; SPR; 16	JED; FEA; 6	IMO; SPR; 3	IMO; FEA; Ret	CAT; SPR; 12	CAT; FEA; 13	MCO; SPR; 1	MCO; FEA; 7	BAK; SPR; Ret	BAK; FEA; 1	SIL; SPR; 15	SIL; FEA; Ret	RBR; SPR; 9	RBR; FEA; 4	LEC; SPR; 12	LEC; FEA; 16	HUN; SPR; Ret	HUN; FEA; 19	SPA; SPR; 10	SPA; FEA; 12	ZAN; SPR; 3	ZAN; FEA; 4	MNZ; SPR; 9	MNZ; FEA; 4	YMC; SPR; 4	YMC; FEA; 4	10th	115
2023	MP Motorsport	BHR; SPR; 2	BHR; FEA; Ret	JED; SPR; 8	JED; FEA; 5	MEL; SPR; 1	MEL; FEA; 19†	BAK; SPR; 12†	BAK; FEA; 6	MCO; SPR; 15	MCO; FEA; 5	CAT; SPR; 4	CAT; FEA; 8	RBR; SPR; 6	RBR; FEA; 11	SIL; SPR; 12	SIL; FEA; 14	HUN; SPR; 1	HUN; FEA; 7	SPA; SPR; 3	SPA; FEA; DSQ	ZAN; SPR; 9	ZAN; FEA; 5	MNZ; SPR; 12	MNZ; FEA; 5	YMC; SPR; 4	YMC; FEA; 7			8th	113
2024	MP Motorsport	BHR; SPR; 8	BHR; FEA; 8	JED; SPR; 1	JED; FEA; 3	MEL; SPR; 2	**MEL**; **FEA**; Ret	IMO; SPR; Ret	IMO; FEA; 12	MON; SPR; 3	MON; FEA; 6	CAT; SPR; 12	CAT; FEA; Ret	RBR; SPR; 5	**RBR**; **FEA**; 12	SIL; SPR; 7	SIL; FEA; 9	HUN; SPR; 4	HUN; FEA; 6	SPA; SPR; 2	SPA; FEA; 12	MNZ; SPR; 8	MNZ; FEA; Ret	BAK; SPR; 14	BAK; FEA; 9	LSL; SPR	LSL; FEA	YMC; SPR	YMC; FEA	11th	85.5

^{†} Driver did not finish the race, but was classified as they completed more than 90% of the race distance.

=== American open–wheel racing results ===
==== Indy NXT ====
(key) (Races in bold indicate pole position) (Races in italics indicate fastest lap) (Races with ^{L} indicate a race lap led) (Races with * indicate most race laps led)

Year	Team	1	2	3	4	5	6	7	8	9	10	11	12	13	14	Rank	Points
2025	Andretti Global	**STP**; 1^{L*}	**BAR**; 1^{L*}	IMS; 8	IMS; 1^{L*}	**DET**; 1^{L*}	**GMP**; 5^{L}	**RDA**; 2^{L*}	**MOH**; 1^{L*}	**IOW**; 2^{L*}	LAG; 2	LAG; 16	POR; 1^{L*}	**MIL**; 2	NSH; 3	1st	599

==== IndyCar Series ====
(key)

Year	Team	No.	Chassis	Engine	1	2	3	4	5	6	7	8	9	10	11	12	13	14	15	16	17	18	Rank	Points	Ref
2026	Dale Coyne Racing	19	Dallara DW12	Honda	STP; 10	PHX; 15	ARL; 16	ALA; 23	LBH; 11	IMS; 8	INDY; 19	DET; 13	GTW; 25	ROA; 20	MOH; 25	NSH; 21	POR; 13	MRK; 15	WSH; 15	MIL; 21	MIL; 21	LAG; 25	22nd	228	

* Season still in progress.

==== Indianapolis 500 ====
Year	Chassis	Engine	Start	Finish	Team
2026	Dallara	Honda	29	19	Dale Coyne Racing

Sporting positions
Preceded by Enzo Fittipaldi	Italian F4 Championship; Champion; 2019	Succeeded by Gabriele Minì
Preceded by Oscar Piastri	FIA Formula 3 Championship; Champion; 2021	Succeeded by Victor Martins
