= 2020 2nd Silverstone Formula 3 round =

(United Kingdom) 2020 2nd Silverstone Formula 3 round
Round details
- Round 5 of 9 in the 2020 FIA Formula 3 Championship.
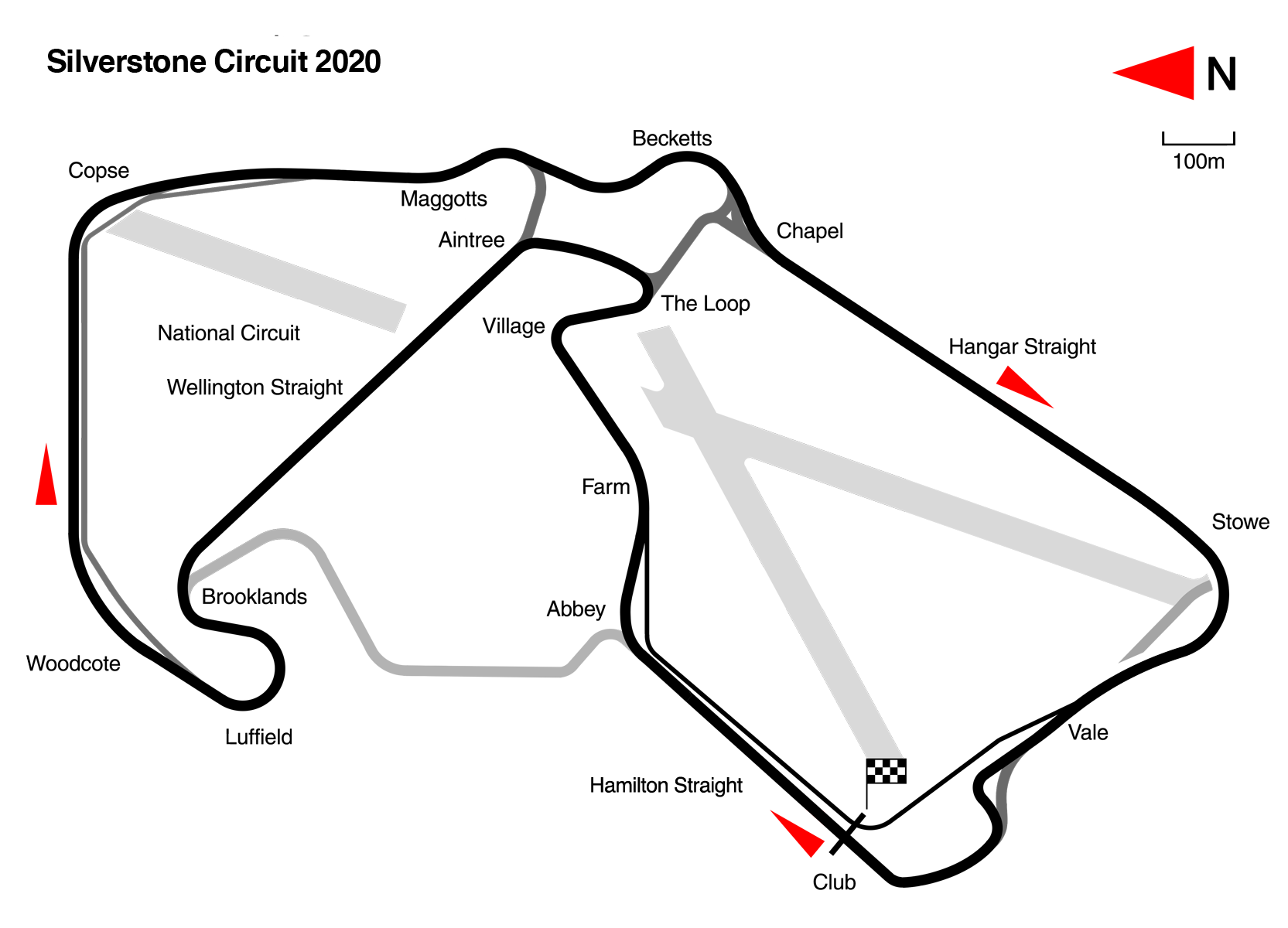
- Layout of the Silverstone Circuit
- Location: Silverstone Circuit; Towchester, United Kingdom
- Course: Permanent racing facility 5.891 km (3.66 mi)

Feature Race
- Date: 8 August 2020
- Laps: 20
Pole position
Driver	(United States) Logan Sargeant	Prema Racing
Time	1:45.063	
Podium
First	(United States) Logan Sargeant	Prema Racing
Second	(United Kingdom) Jake Hughes	HWA Racelab
Third	(New Zealand) Liam Lawson	Hitech Grand Prix
Fastest lap
Driver	(New Zealand) Liam Lawson	Hitech Grand Prix
- Time: 1:47.665 (on lap 15)

Sprint Race
- Date: 9 August 2020
- Laps: 20
Podium
First	(Netherlands) Bent Viscaal	MP Motorsport
Second	(Germany) Lirim Zendeli	Trident
Third	(France) Théo Pourchaire	ART Grand Prix
Fastest lap
Driver	(Netherlands) Bent Viscaal	MP Motorsport
- Time: 1:46.632 (on lap 18)

The 2020 2nd Silverstone FIA Formula 3 round was a motor racing event held on 8 and 9 August 2020 at the Silverstone Circuit, Towcester, United Kingdom. It was the fifth round of the 2020 FIA Formula 3 Championship, and ran in support of the 70th Anniversary Grand Prix.

== Classification ==
=== Qualifying ===
The Qualifying session took place on 7 August 2020, with Logan Sargeant scoring his second successive pole position.

Pos.	No.	Driver	Team	Time/Gap	Grid
1	3	(United States) Logan Sargeant	Prema Racing	1:45.063	1
2	5	(New Zealand) Liam Lawson	Hitech Grand Prix	+0.234	2
3	15	(United Kingdom) Jake Hughes	HWA Racelab	+0.344	3
4	2	(Denmark) Frederik Vesti	Prema Racing	+0.521	4
5	18	(Netherlands) Bent Viscaal	MP Motorsport	+0.534	5
6	7	(France) Théo Pourchaire	ART Grand Prix	+0.567	6
7	16	(Australia) Jack Doohan	HWA Racelab	+0.573	7
8	11	(Germany) David Beckmann	Trident	+0.615	8
9	25	(United Kingdom) Ben Barnicoat	Carlin Buzz Racing	+0.702	9
10	10	(Germany) Lirim Zendeli	Trident	+0.796	10
11	1	(Australia) Oscar Piastri	Prema Racing	+0.814	11
12	26	(France) Clément Novalak	Carlin Buzz Racing	+0.830	12
13	14	(Brazil) Enzo Fittipaldi	HWA Racelab	+0.890	13
14	22	(Italy) Matteo Nannini	Jenzer Motorsport	+0.909	14
15	28	(United States) Cameron Das	Carlin Buzz Racing	+0.966	15
16	4	(United Kingdom) Max Fewtrell	Hitech Grand Prix	+0.966	16
17	8	(Russia) Aleksandr Smolyar	ART Grand Prix	+0.972	17
18	29	(Australia) Alex Peroni	Campos Racing	+1.021	18
19	9	(Venezuela) Sebastián Fernández	ART Grand Prix	+1.134	19
20	20	(Australia) Calan Williams	Jenzer Motorsport	+1.158	20
21	21	(Italy) Federico Malvestiti	Jenzer Motorsport	+1.216	21
22	25	(Germany) David Schumacher	Charouz Racing System	+1.328	22
23	12	(United Kingdom) Olli Caldwell	Trident	+1.366	23
24	6	(Norway) Dennis Hauger	Hitech Grand Prix	+1.496	24
25	23	(Czech Republic) Roman Staněk	Charouz Racing System	+1.557	25
26	24	(Brazil) Igor Fraga	Charouz Racing System	+1.624	26
27	17	(Netherlands) Richard Verschoor	MP Motorsport	+1.648	27
28	19	(Austria) Lukas Dunner	MP Motorsport	+2.075	28
29	31	(Germany) Sophia Flörsch	Campos Racing	+2.179	29
30	30	(Italy) Alessio Deledda	Campos Racing	+2.797	30

=== Feature Race ===
Pos.	No.	Driver	Team	Laps	Time/Retired	Grid	Pts.
1	3	(United States) Logan Sargeant	Prema Racing	20	36:14.262	1	25 (4)
2	15	(United Kingdom) Jake Hughes	HWA Racelab	20	+1.552	3	18
3	5	(New Zealand) Liam Lawson	Hitech Grand Prix	20	+2.025	2	15 (2)
4	2	(Denmark) Frederik Vesti	Prema Racing	20	+2.339	4	12
5	11	(Germany) David Beckmann	Trident	20	+4.870	8	10
6	7	(France) Théo Pourchaire	ART Grand Prix	20	+9.370	6	8
7	1	(Australia) Oscar Piastri	Prema Racing	20	+10.087	11	6
8	18	(Netherlands) Bent Viscaal	MP Motorsport	20	+10.705	5	4
9	10	(Germany) Lirim Zendeli	Trident	20	+11.535	10	2
10	25	(United Kingdom) Ben Barnicoat	Carlin Buzz Racing	20	+12.072	9	1
11	28	(United States) Cameron Das	Carlin Buzz Racing	20	+14.284	15	
12	26	(France) Clément Novalak	Carlin Buzz Racing	20	+14.661^{1}	12	
13	8	(Russia) Aleksandr Smolyar	ART Grand Prix	20	+17.215	17	
14	29	(Australia) Alex Peroni	Campos Racing	20	+17.715	18	
15	25	(Germany) David Schumacher	Charouz Racing System	20	+20.475	22	
16	4	(United Kingdom) Max Fewtrell	Hitech Grand Prix	20	+21.368	16	
17	14	(Brazil) Enzo Fittipaldi	HWA Racelab	20	+22.278	13	
18	24	(Brazil) Igor Fraga	Charouz Racing System	20	+22.971	26	
19	17	(Netherlands) Richard Verschoor	MP Motorsport	20	+23.441	27	
20	31	(Germany) Sophia Flörsch	Campos Racing	20	+24.078	29	
21	12	(United Kingdom) Olli Caldwell	Trident	20	+24.369	23	
22	23	(Czech Republic) Roman Staněk	Charouz Racing System	20	+25.014	25	
23	19	(Austria) Lukas Dunner	MP Motorsport	20	+31.254	28	
24	9	(Venezuela) Sebastián Fernández	ART Grand Prix	20	+33.229	19	
25	30	(Italy) Alessio Deledda	Campos Racing	20	+39.766	30	
26	16	(Australia) Jack Doohan	HWA Racelab	20	+1:32.538	7	
DNF	22	(Italy) Matteo Nannini	Jenzer Motorsport	19	Collision^{2}	14	
DNF	20	(Australia) Calan Williams	Jenzer Motorsport	4	Collision damage	20	
DNF	21	(Italy) Federico Malvestiti	Jenzer Motorsport	4	Collision damage	21	
DNF	6	(Norway) Dennis Hauger	Hitech Grand Prix	2	Suspension	24	
Fastest lap set by (New Zealand) Liam Lawson: 1:47.665 (lap 15)

Notes：

- ^1 - Clément Novalak received a five-second time penalty for going off track at Turn 15 and gaining an advantage.
- ^2 - Matteo Nannini was handed a three-place grid drop for Race 2, for making contact with Sebastián Fernández at Turn 15.

=== Sprint Race ===
Pos.	No.	Driver	Team	Laps	Time/Retired	Grid	Pts.
1	18	(Netherlands) Bent Viscaal	MP Motorsport	20	40:32.362	3	15 (2)
2	10	(Germany) Lirim Zendeli	Trident	20	+0.189	2	12
3	7	(France) Théo Pourchaire	ART Grand Prix	20	+8.395	5	10
4	11	(Germany) David Beckmann	Trident	20	+8.829	6	8
5	5	(New Zealand) Liam Lawson	Hitech Grand Prix	20	+8.848	8	6
6	1	(Australia) Oscar Piastri	Prema Racing	20	+9.226	4	5
7	15	(United Kingdom) Jake Hughes	HWA Racelab	20	+10.742	9	4
8	2	(Denmark) Frederik Vesti	Prema Racing	20	+10.966	7	3
9	26	(France) Clément Novalak	Carlin Buzz Racing	20	+11.501	12	2
10	24	(Brazil) Igor Fraga	Charouz Racing System	20	+22.833	18	1
11	28	(United States) Cameron Das	Carlin Buzz Racing	20	+23.898	11	
12	4	(United Kingdom) Max Fewtrell	Hitech Grand Prix	20	+23.937	16	
13	9	(Venezuela) Sebastián Fernández	ART Grand Prix	20	+24.043	24	
14	8	(Russia) Aleksandr Smolyar	ART Grand Prix	20	+24.918	13	
15	23	(Czech Republic) Roman Staněk	Charouz Racing System	20	+25.441	22	
16	22	(Italy) Matteo Nannini	Jenzer Motorsport	20	+26.007	30	
17	14	(Brazil) Enzo Fittipaldi	HWA Racelab	20	+26.340^{1}	17	
18	17	(Netherlands) Richard Verschoor	MP Motorsport	20	+26.362	19	
19	31	(Germany) Sophia Flörsch	Campos Racing	20	+26.718	20	
20	6	(Norway) Dennis Hauger	Hitech Grand Prix	20	+27.176	29	
21	16	(Australia) Jack Doohan	HWA Racelab	20	+27.791	26	
22	12	(United Kingdom) Olli Caldwell	Trident	20	+28.002	21	
23	21	(Italy) Federico Malvestiti	Jenzer Motorsport	20	+28.132	28	
24	29	(Australia) Alex Peroni	Campos Racing	20	+1:00.615	14	
DNF	25	(United Kingdom) Ben Barnicoat	Carlin Buzz Racing	11	Mechanical	1	
DNF	3	(United States) Logan Sargeant	Prema Racing	10	Collision damage	10	
DNF	30	(Italy) Alessio Deledda	Campos Racing	2	Collision damage	25	
DNF	25	(Germany) David Schumacher	Charouz Racing System	1	Collision damage	15	
DNF	19	(Austria) Lukas Dunner	MP Motorsport	0	Collision	23	
DNF	20	(Australia) Calan Williams	Jenzer Motorsport	0	Collision	27	
Fastest lap set by (Netherlands) Bent Viscaal: 1:46.632 (lap 18)

Note：

- ^1 - Enzo Fittipaldi was handed a five second time penalty for gaining an unfair advantage on Cameron Das.

== Standings after the event ==
Drivers' Championship standings

	Pos.	Driver	Points
1	1	(United States) Logan Sargeant	106
1	2	(Australia) Oscar Piastri	105
	3	(Germany) David Beckmann	82.5
1	4	(New Zealand) Liam Lawson	77
1	5	(Denmark) Frederik Vesti	70.5

Teams' Championship standings

Pos.	Team	Points
1	(Italy) Prema Racing	281.5
2	(Italy) Trident	132.5
3	(France) ART Grand Prix	114
4	(United Kingdom) Hitech Grand Prix	96
5	(Netherlands) MP Motorsport	83

- Note: Only the top five positions are included for both sets of standings.

== See also ==
- 70th Anniversary Grand Prix
- 2020 2nd Silverstone Formula 2 round

Previous round: 2020 Silverstone Formula 3 round	FIA Formula 3 Championship; 2020 season	Next round: 2020 Barcelona Formula 3 round
Previous round: 2020 Silverstone Formula 3 round	Silverstone Formula 3 round	Next round: 2022 Silverstone Formula 3 round
