= 2020 Silverstone Formula 3 round =

2020 UK motor racing event

(United Kingdom) 2020 Silverstone Formula 3 round
Round details
- Round 4 of 9 in the 2020 FIA Formula 3 Championship.
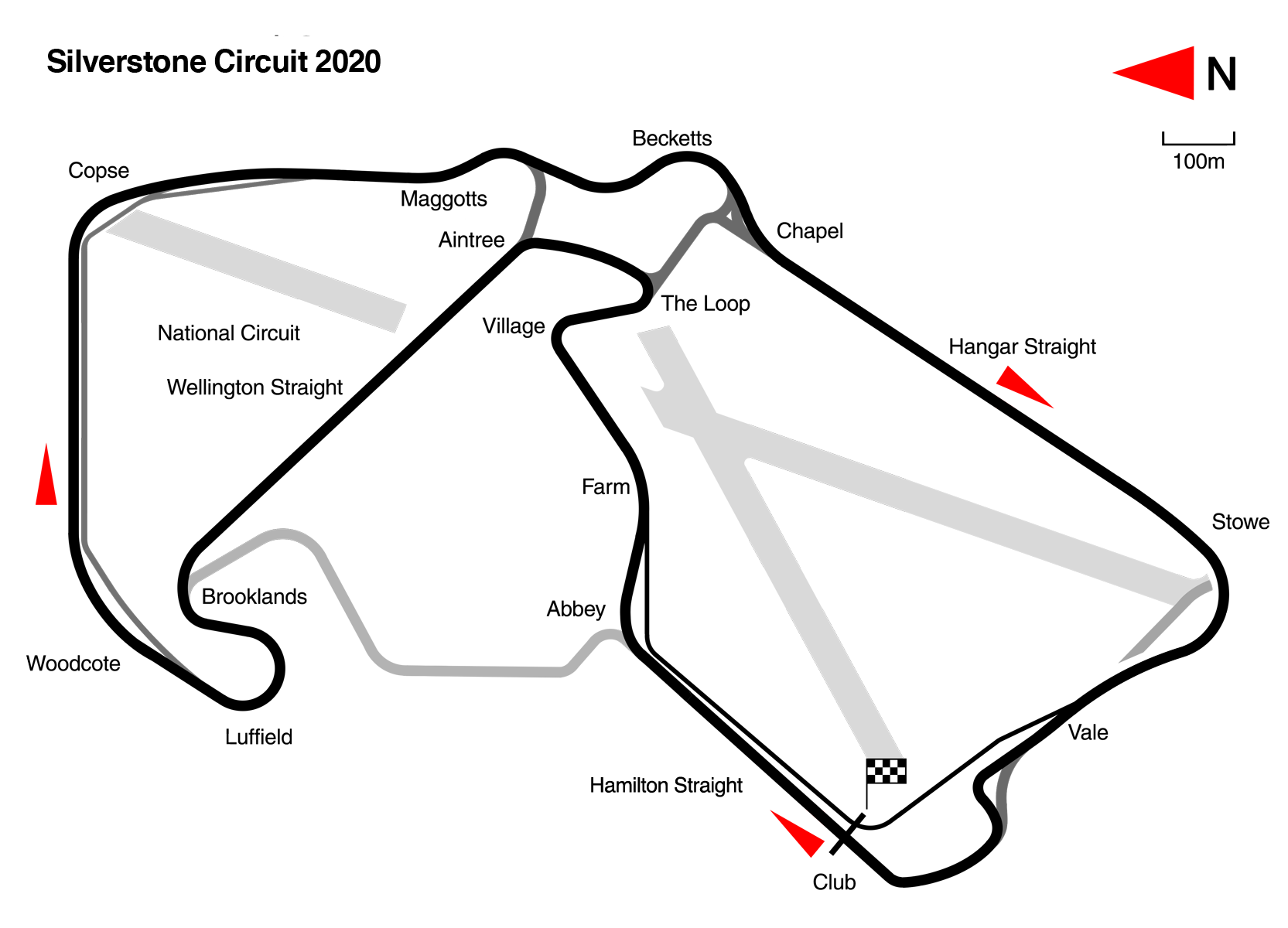
- Layout of the Silverstone Circuit
- Location: Silverstone Circuit; Towchester, United Kingdom
- Course: Permanent racing facility 5.891 km (3.66 mi)

Feature Race
- Date: 1 August 2020
- Laps: 20
Pole position
Driver	(United States) Logan Sargeant	Prema Racing
Time	1:46.257	
Podium
First	(New Zealand) Liam Lawson	Hitech Grand Prix
Second	(Australia) Oscar Piastri	Prema Racing
Third	(United States) Logan Sargeant	Prema Racing
Fastest lap
Driver	(France) Clément Novalak	Carlin Buzz Racing
- Time: 1:47.095 (on lap 5)

Sprint Race
- Date: 2 August 2020
- Laps: 20
Podium
First	(Germany) David Beckmann	Trident
Second	(France) Clément Novalak	Carlin Buzz Racing
Third	(Australia) Alex Peroni	Campos Racing
Fastest lap
Driver	(United States) Logan Sargeant	Prema Racing
- Time: 1:45.968 (on lap 20)

The 2020 Silverstone FIA Formula 3 round is a motor racing event held on 1 and 2 August 2020 at the Silverstone Circuit, Towcester, United Kingdom. It was the fourth round of the 2020 FIA Formula 3 Championship, and ran in support of the 2020 British Grand Prix.

== Entries ==
Ben Barnicoat replaced Enaam Ahmed at Carlin due to sponsorship reasons, marking the first open-wheeler start for Barnicoat since 2016.

== Classification ==
=== Qualifying ===
The Qualifying session took place on 31 July 2020, with Logan Sargeant scoring his first pole position in Formula 3.

Pos.	No.	Driver	Team	Time/Gap	Grid
1	3	(United States) Logan Sargeant	Prema Racing	1:46.257	1
2	5	(New Zealand) Liam Lawson	Hitech Grand Prix	+0.058	2
3	1	(Australia) Oscar Piastri	Prema Racing	+0.126	3
4	4	(United Kingdom) Max Fewtrell	Hitech Grand Prix	+0.473	4
5	2	(Denmark) Frederik Vesti	Prema Racing	+0.528	5
6	29	(Australia) Alex Peroni	Campos Racing	+0.540	6
7	9	(Venezuela) Sebastián Fernández	ART Grand Prix	+0.639	7
8	15	(United Kingdom) Jake Hughes	HWA Racelab	+0.653	8
9	10	(Germany) Lirim Zendeli	Trident	+0.684	9
10	8	(Russia) Aleksandr Smolyar	ART Grand Prix	+0.684	10
11	26	(France) Clément Novalak	Carlin Buzz Racing	+0.729	11
12	11	(Germany) David Beckmann	Trident	+0.745	12
13	7	(France) Théo Pourchaire	ART Grand Prix	+0.787	13
14	18	(Netherlands) Bent Viscaal	MP Motorsport	+0.891	14
15	17	(Netherlands) Richard Verschoor	MP Motorsport	+0.905	15
16	20	(Australia) Calan Williams	Jenzer Motorsport	+0.920	16
17	31	(Germany) Sophia Flörsch	Campos Racing	+1.087	17
18	12	(United Kingdom) Olli Caldwell	Trident	+1.125	18
19	6	(Norway) Dennis Hauger	Hitech Grand Prix	+1.172	19
20	25	(United Kingdom) Ben Barnicoat	Carlin Buzz Racing	+1.205	20
21	16	(Australia) Jack Doohan	HWA Racelab	+1.217	21
22	19	(Austria) Lukas Dunner	MP Motorsport	+1.247	22
23	23	(Czech Republic) Roman Staněk	Charouz Racing System	+1.367	23
24	24	(Brazil) Igor Fraga	Charouz Racing System	+1.399	24
25	14	(Brazil) Enzo Fittipaldi	HWA Racelab	+1.410	25
26	22	(Italy) Matteo Nannini	Jenzer Motorsport	+1.460	26
27	25	(Germany) David Schumacher	Charouz Racing System	+1.474	27
28	28	(United States) Cameron Das	Carlin Buzz Racing	+1.980	28
29	21	(Italy) Federico Malvestiti	Jenzer Motorsport	+2.032	29
30	30	(Italy) Alessio Deledda	Campos Racing	+2.127	30

=== Feature Race ===
Pos.	No.	Driver	Team	Laps	Time/Retired	Grid	Pts.
1	5	(New Zealand) Liam Lawson	Hitech Grand Prix	20	43:28.199	2	25
2	1	(Australia) Oscar Piastri	Prema Racing	20	+1.060	3	18
3	3	(United States) Logan Sargeant	Prema Racing	20	+2.698	1	15 (4)
4	15	(United Kingdom) Jake Hughes	HWA Racelab	20	+5.127	8	12
5	2	(Denmark) Frederik Vesti	Prema Racing	20	+9.087	5	10
6	29	(Australia) Alex Peroni	Campos Racing	20	+11.298	6	8
7	9	(Venezuela) Sebastián Fernández	ART Grand Prix	20	+13.542	7	6
8	26	(France) Clément Novalak	Carlin Buzz Racing	20	+15.461	11	4 (2)
9	11	(Germany) David Beckmann	Trident	20	+17.847	12	2
10	8	(Russia) Aleksandr Smolyar	ART Grand Prix	20	+21.295	10	1
11	17	(Netherlands) Richard Verschoor	MP Motorsport	20	+24.424	15	
12	7	(France) Théo Pourchaire	ART Grand Prix	20	+30.609	13	
13	10	(Germany) Lirim Zendeli	Trident	20	+34.001	9	
14	20	(Australia) Calan Williams	Jenzer Motorsport	20	+35.534	16	
15	24	(Brazil) Igor Fraga	Charouz Racing System	20	+36.587	24	
16	6	(Norway) Dennis Hauger	Hitech Grand Prix	20	+43.637	19	
17	23	(Czech Republic) Roman Staněk	Charouz Racing System	20	+45.157	23	
18	14	(Brazil) Enzo Fittipaldi	HWA Racelab	20	+46.350	25	
19	21	(Italy) Federico Malvestiti	Jenzer Motorsport	20	+47.149	29	
20	25	(United Kingdom) Ben Barnicoat	Carlin Buzz Racing	20	+49.118	20	
21	28	(United States) Cameron Das	Carlin Buzz Racing	20	+50.073	28	
22	31	(Germany) Sophia Flörsch	Campos Racing	20	+51.724	17	
23	30	(Italy) Alessio Deledda	Campos Racing	20	+55.015	30	
24	22	(Italy) Matteo Nannini	Jenzer Motorsport	20	+1:03.739^{2}	26	
25	25	(Germany) David Schumacher	Charouz Racing System	20	+1 lap	27	
DNF	19	(Austria) Lukas Dunner	MP Motorsport	16	Collision	22	
DNF	4	(United Kingdom) Max Fewtrell	Hitech Grand Prix	16	Collision^{1}	4	
DNF	12	(United Kingdom) Olli Caldwell	Trident	16	Collision	18	
DNF	18	(Netherlands) Bent Viscaal	MP Motorsport	12	Collision	14	
DNF	16	(Australia) Jack Doohan	HWA Racelab	12	Collision	21	
Fastest lap set by (United Kingdom) Clément Novalak: 1:47.095 (lap 5)

Notes：

- ^1 - Max Fewtrell was given a three-place grid drop for Race 2 for causing a collision with Olli Caldwell.
- ^2 - Matteo Nannini was given a five-second penalty for exceeding the minimum delta time in three marshalling sectors while under safety car conditions.

=== Sprint Race ===
Pos.	No.	Driver	Team	Laps	Time/Retired	Grid	Pts.
1	11	(Germany) David Beckmann	Trident	20	39:10.052	2	15
2	26	(France) Clément Novalak	Carlin Buzz Racing	20	+0.426	3	12
3	29	(Australia) Alex Peroni	Campos Racing	20	+0.985	5	10
4	2	(Denmark) Frederik Vesti	Prema Racing	20	+1.500	6	8
5	3	(United States) Logan Sargeant	Prema Racing	20	+1.892	8	6 (2)
6	8	(Russia) Aleksandr Smolyar	ART Grand Prix	20	+4.260^{1}	1	5
7	5	(New Zealand) Liam Lawson	Hitech Grand Prix	20	+5.708	10	4
8	7	(France) Théo Pourchaire	ART Grand Prix	20	+6.251	12	3
9	17	(Netherlands) Richard Verschoor	MP Motorsport	20	+6.861	11	2
10	15	(United Kingdom) Jake Hughes	HWA Racelab	20	+7.149	7	1
11	10	(Germany) Lirim Zendeli	Trident	20	+7.618	13	
12	25	(United Kingdom) Ben Barnicoat	Carlin Buzz Racing	20	+10.998	20	
13	21	(Italy) Federico Malvestiti	Jenzer Motorsport	20	+13.023	19	
14	20	(Australia) Calan Williams	Jenzer Motorsport	20	+13.617	14	
15	25	(Germany) David Schumacher	Charouz Racing System	20	+13.906	25	
16	18	(Netherlands) Bent Viscaal	MP Motorsport	20	+16.594	28	
17	6	(Norway) Dennis Hauger	Hitech Grand Prix	20	+17.852	16	
18	23	(Czech Republic) Roman Staněk	Charouz Racing System	20	+18.356	17	
19	14	(Brazil) Enzo Fittipaldi	HWA Racelab	20	+18.598	18	
20	4	(United Kingdom) Max Fewtrell	Hitech Grand Prix	20	+20.521	30	
21	9	(Venezuela) Sebastián Fernández	ART Grand Prix	20	+21.548	4	
22	19	(Austria) Lukas Dunner	MP Motorsport	20	+22.123	26	
23	22	(Italy) Matteo Nannini	Jenzer Motorsport	20	+22.624	24	
24	28	(United States) Cameron Das	Carlin Buzz Racing	20	+25.256	21	
25	31	(Germany) Sophia Flörsch	Campos Racing	20	+26.254^{2}	22	
26	12	(United Kingdom) Olli Caldwell	Trident	20	+27.738	27	
27	16	(Australia) Jack Doohan	HWA Racelab	20	+28.934	29	
28	30	(Italy) Alessio Deledda	Campos Racing	20	+33.132	23	
DNF	1	(Australia) Oscar Piastri	Prema Racing	12	Mechanical	9	
DNF	24	(Brazil) Igor Fraga	Charouz Racing System	5	Mechanical	15	
Fastest lap set by (United States) Logan Sargeant: 1:45.968 (lap 20)

Notes：

- ^1 - Aleksandr Smolyar originally won the race but was penalised for changing direction down the straight between corners 14 and 15, in order to break the tow between himself and Beckmann in P2.
- ^2 - Sophia Flörsch was handed a five-second time penalty for forcing Cameron Das off the track.

== Standings after the event ==
Drivers' Championship standings

	Pos.	Driver	Points
	1	(Australia) Oscar Piastri	94
	2	(United States) Logan Sargeant	77
1	3	(Germany) David Beckmann	64.5
2	4	(Denmark) Frederik Vesti	55.5
3	5	(New Zealand) Liam Lawson	54

Teams' Championship standings

	Pos.	Team	Points
	1	(Italy) Prema Racing	226.5
	2	(Italy) Trident	100.5
	3	(France) ART Grand Prix	96
1	4	(United Kingdom) Hitech Grand Prix	73
1	5	(Netherlands) MP Motorsport	62

- Note: Only the top five positions are included for both sets of standings.

== See also ==
- 2020 British Grand Prix
- 2020 Silverstone Formula 2 round

Previous round: 2020 Budapest Formula 3 round	FIA Formula 3 Championship; 2020 season	Next round: 2020 2nd Silverstone Formula 3 round
Previous round: 2019 Silverstone Formula 3 round	Silverstone Formula 3 round	Next round: 2020 2nd Silverstone Formula 3 round
