= Ferrari Driver Academy =

Formula One racing driver development program by Ferrari

(Italy) Ferrari Driver Academy
- Founded: 2009; 17 years ago
- Base: Maranello, Modena, Italy
- Team principal(s): Jérôme d'Ambrosio
- Current drivers: FIA Formula 2; (Sweden) Dino Beganovic; (Brazil) Rafael Câmara; Formula 3; (Finland) Tuukka Taponen; Formula 4; (Denmark) Alba Hurup Larsen; (Italy) Niccolò Maccagnani; Karting; (United Kingdom) Noah Baglin; (Italy) Filippo Sala
- Website: Official website

The Scuderia Ferrari Driver Academy is a driver development program by Scuderia Ferrari to nurture young talent within its own organisation for potential Formula One entries. Over the years, several Academy drivers have progressed onto F1, such as Charles Leclerc, Sergio Pérez, Lance Stroll, Mick Schumacher, Zhou Guanyu, Oliver Bearman and Rafael Câmara.

The Academy is currently supervised by Jérôme d'Ambrosio, who competed in Formula One between 2011 and 2012.

== History ==
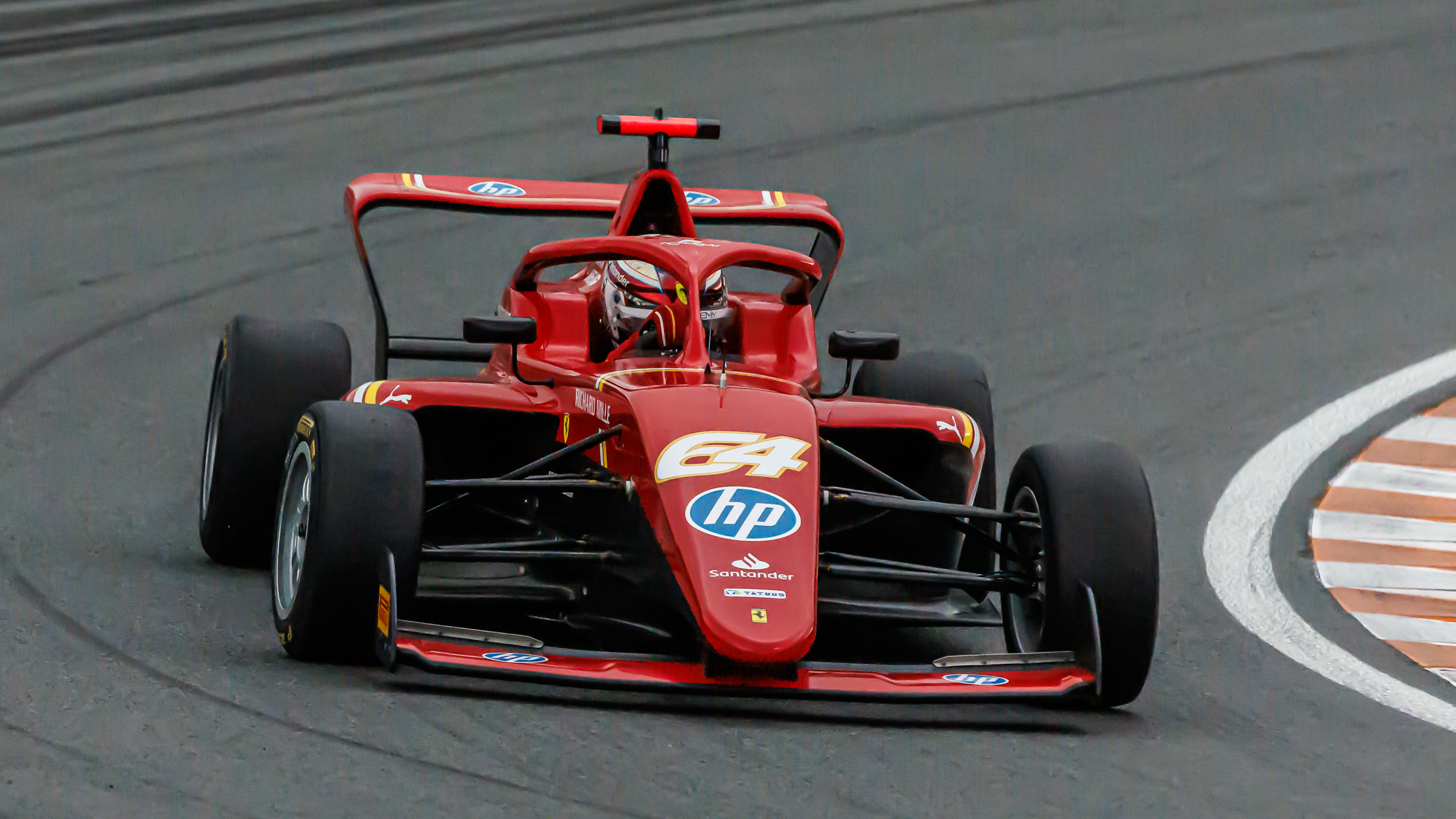
Academy driver Maya Weug driving a Ferrari-liveried Tatuus F4-T421 at Zandvoort during the 2024 F1 Academy season

The idea for a Ferrari Driver Academy came from Felipe Massa's coaching within the Ferrari organisation, with the Brazilian being loaned out to Sauber for three seasons whilst being under contract with Ferrari. Jules Bianchi became the first recruit to the scheme in December 2009, being followed by Mirko Bortolotti, Daniel Zampieri, and Raffaele Marciello in March 2010. In late 2010, Ferrari confirmed Sergio Pérez had been signed up to the scheme, the Mexican being set to be its first graduate to Formula One competition, having already signed for Ferrari-powered Sauber days before the announcement. Pérez left the academy after signing to McLaren in 2013. Bianchi also ceased being a member in July 2015, after dying from injuries sustained at the 2014 Japanese Grand Prix whilst racing for the Ferrari-powered Marussia team. Lance Stroll also left the academy, moving to Williams for the 2017 Formula One season. Marciello, on the other hand, ceased to be a member for personal reasons, though later stated that he was removed from the team and believed that Ferrari's team principal at the time, Maurizio Arrivabene, "just didn't like" him.

After rumours of the academy being disbanded, it was announced that the programme would be expanded with Massimo Rivola as its new head. On 23 June 2015, Antonio Fuoco had his first Formula One test with Ferrari during the 2-day post-Austrian Grand Prix test at the Red Bull Ring. In March 2016, it was announced that Charles Leclerc would be inducted into the Ferrari Driver Academy. In November of that year, Enzo Fittipaldi was amongst five drivers invited to join the Ferrari Driver Academy and was confirmed as a Ferrari Driver Academy member alongside Marcus Armstrong the following month. In late 2017, Ferrari added Callum Ilott, Robert Shwartzman and Gianluca Petecof to their line-up. Mick Schumacher, the son of multiple Formula One World champion Michael Schumacher was added to the lineup in 2019.

In September 2018, it was announced Leclerc would become the first academy member to graduate to Ferrari in 2019.

Mick Schumacher graduated to F1 with Haas F1 after winning the 2020 Formula 2 Championship, whilst Championship runner-up Callum Ilott was given a test and reserve driver role at Scuderia Ferrari. After 2020, three drivers left the academy: Giuliano Alesi, Enzo Fittipaldi and reigning Formula Regional European Champion Gianluca Petecof; meanwhile Australian karter James Wharton joined it after winning the Ferrari Scouting competition.

In January 2021, Maya Weug, 16, became the first female driver to join the academy. In Autumn of 2021 Ferrari added European Karting vice-champion Rafael Câmara and Italian F4 and ADAC F4 champion Oliver Bearman to their lineup, after the pair won the Ferrari's Scouting World Final.

Following the second running of the Girls On Track – Rising Stars competition, Laura Camps Torras was signed to the setup.

In July 2024, Haas F1 announced that they have signed Bearman on a multi-year contract beginning in the 2025 season.

== Current drivers ==
Driver	Years	Current Series	Titles as FDA member
(Sweden) Dino Beganovic	2020–2026	FIA Formula 2 Championship	Formula Regional European Championship (2022)
(Finland) Tuukka Taponen	2023–	FIA Formula 3 Championship	Formula Regional Middle East Championship (2024)
(United Kingdom) Noah Baglin	2025–	Karting (OK)	none
(Italy) Filippo Sala	2025–	Karting (OK)	none
(Denmark) Alba Hurup Larsen	2026–	UAE4 Series; F1 Academy; F4 British Championship	none
(Italy) Niccolò Maccagnani	2026–	UAE4 Series; Italian F4 Championship; FIA Formula 3 Championship	none
(Turkey) Alp Aksoy	2027–	Italian F4 Championship	none
(Colombia) Salim Hanna	2027–	Formula Regional European Championship	none
(Spain) Daniel Mirón	2027–	Karting (OK-Junior)	none

== Graduates to Formula One ==
This list contains the drivers that have graduated to Formula One with support from Ferrari. Therefore, drivers who have had support in the past and entered Formula One through other means, such as Lance Stroll and Zhou Guanyu, are not included. Drivers who drove for other teams while still part of Ferrari's youth setup are highlighted in italics.

Driver	Academy experience		F1 experience with Ferrari	F1 experience with other teams
Driver	Years	Former series	F1 experience with Ferrari	F1 experience with other teams
(France) Jules Bianchi	2009–2014	Formula 3 Euro Series (2009); GP2 Series (2010–2011); Formula Renault 3.5 Series (2012); Formula One (2013–2014)	—N/a	Marussia (2013–2014)
(Mexico) Sergio Pérez	2010–2012	GP2 Series (2010); Formula One (2011–2012)	—N/a	Sauber (2011–2012); McLaren (2013); Force India (2014–2018); Racing Point (2019–2020); Red Bull Racing (2021–2024); Cadillac (2026–)
(Monaco) Charles Leclerc	2016–2018	GP3 Series (2016); FIA Formula 2 Championship (2017)	2019–	Sauber (2018)
(Germany) Mick Schumacher	2019–2022	Formula 2 Championship (2019–2020)	—N/a	Haas (2021–2022)
(Brazil) Rafael Câmara	2021–2026	Formula 4 UAE Championship (2022); Italian F4 Championship (2022); ADAC Formula 4 (2022); Formula Regional Middle East Championship (2023–2024); Formula Regional European Championship (2023–2024); FIA Formula 3 Championship (2025); FIA Formula 2 Championship (2026)	—N/a	Haas (2026–)
(United Kingdom) Oliver Bearman	2022–2024	FIA Formula 3 Championship (2022); Formula Regional Asian Championship (2022); FIA Formula 2 Championship (2023–2024)	2024	Haas (2024–)

== Former drivers ==
Driver	Years	Series competed as Ferrari Driver Academy member	F1 team(s)
(Italy) Mirko Bortolotti	2010	GP3 Series (2010)	None
(Italy) Daniel Zampieri	2010	Formula Renault 3.5 Series (2010)	None
(France) Brandon Maïsano	2010–2012	**Formula Abarth** (**2010**); Italian Formula Three Championship (2011–2012)	None
(Canada) Lance Stroll	2010–2015	Karting (2010–2013); **Italian F4 Championship** (**2014**); **Toyota Racing Series** (**2015**); FIA Formula 3 European Championship (2015)	Williams (2017–2018); Racing Point (2019–2020); Aston Martin (2021–)
(Italy) Raffaele Marciello	2010–2015	Formula Abarth (2010); Italian Formula Three Championship (2011); Toyota Racing Series (2012); Formula 3 Euro Series (2012); **FIA Formula 3 European Championship** (2012–**2013**); GP2 Series (2014–2015)	None
(Italy) Antonio Fuoco	2012–2018	**Formula Renault 2.0 Alps** (**2013**); FIA Formula 3 European Championship (2014); GP3 Series (2015–2016); FIA Formula 2 Championship (2017–2018)	None
(China) Zhou Guanyu	2014–2018	Italian F4 Championship (2015); ADAC Formula 4 (2015); Toyota Racing Series (2016); FIA Formula 3 European Championship (2016–2018)	Alfa Romeo (2022–2023); Kick Sauber (2024)
(France) Giuliano Alesi	2016–2020	GP3 Series (2016–2018); FIA Formula 2 Championship (2019–2020)	None
(Brazil) Gianluca Petecof	2017–2020	Italian F4 Championship (2018–2019); ADAC Formula 4 (2018–2019); **Formula Regional European Championship** (**2020**)	None
(Brazil) Enzo Fittipaldi	2017–2020	ADAC Formula 4 (2017–2018); **Italian F4 Championship** (2017–**2018**); Formula Regional European Championship (2019); FIA Formula 3 Championship (2020)	None
(New Zealand) Marcus Armstrong	2017–2021	Toyota Racing Series (2017–2019); **Italian F4 Championship** (**2017**); ADAC Formula 4 (2017); FIA Formula 3 European Championship (2018); FIA Formula 3 Championship (2019); FIA Formula 2 Championship (2020–2021)	None
(United Kingdom) Callum Ilott	2017–2021 (Note: Ilott was still contracted to Ferrari in 2022, but was said to be on an extended "gap year" from the academy whilst racing in the IndyCar Series.)	GP3 Series (2018); FIA Formula 2 Championship (2019–2020); GT World Challenge Europe Endurance Cup (2021)	None
(Russia) / (Israel) Robert Shwartzman	2017–2022	Formula Renault Eurocup (2017); **Toyota Racing Series** (**2018**); FIA Formula 3 European Championship (2018); **FIA Formula 3 Championship** (**2019**); FIA Formula 2 Championship (2020–2021)	None
(Monaco) Arthur Leclerc	2020–2023	Formula Regional European Championship (2020); FIA Formula 3 Championship (2021–2022); **Formula Regional Asian Championship** (**2022**); FIA Formula 2 Championship (2023)	None
(Australia) James Wharton	2021–2023	**Formula 4 UAE Championship** (2022–**2023**); Italian F4 Championship (2022–2023); ADAC Formula 4 (2022); Euro 4 Championship (2023)	None
(Netherlands) Maya Weug	2021–2025	Italian F4 Championship (2021–2022); ADAC Formula 4 Championship (2021–2022); Formula Regional European Championship (2023–2025); F1 Academy (2024–2025)	none
(Spain) Laura Camps Torras	2022	Karting (2022)	None
(Portugal) Maria Germano Neto	2022	Karting (2022)	None
(Brazil) Aurelia Nobels	2023–2025	Italian F4 Championship (2023); Euro 4 Championship (2023–2024); Formula 4 UAE Championship (2024); F1 Academy (2024–2025); F4 Saudi Arabian Championship (2024); F4 British Championship (2024); Eurocup-4 Spanish Winter Championship (2025)	None

- Championship titles highlighted in **bold**.

== Esports ==
In 2019, Ferrari established the FDA Esports Team to compete in the Formula One Esports Series. That same year, Italian David Tonizza won the drivers' championship, securing their first championship victory.

In 2020, Enzo Bonito and Filip Prešnajder joined the team. A much harder season was to come, with Ferrari only taking 2 wins in the season, both achieved by Tonizza.

For 2021, two-time Esports champion Brendon Leigh joined the team from Mercedes to partner Tonizza and newcomer Domenico Lovece. They finished 4th in the teams' championship on 125 points with 1 win and 2 podiums, both from Tonizza.

Runner-up from 2017 Fabrizio Donoso joined Leigh and Tonizza at Ferrari for 2022. They endured their worst season to date, with only one podium from Leigh and ending up 7th in the team standings.

=== Scuderia Ferrari Esports Team ===
Driver	Years	Current Series	Titles as FDA member
(Iran) Bardia Broumand	2023–	F1 Sim Racing	none
(United Kingdom) Dylan Warren	2023–	F1 Sim Racing	none
(Poland) Kamil Stachura	2023–	F1 Sim Racing	none
(Netherlands) Isaac Gillissen	2024–	SRO Intercontinental GT Challenge Esports; Virtual Endurance Championship; DTM Esports Pro Championship; British F4 Esports Championship	Virtual Endurance Championship; Ferrari Esports Series (2023)
(Hungary) Gergő Báldi	2024–	SRO Intercontinental GT Challenge Esports; DTM Esports Pro Championship; Precision Racing League GT3 Sprint Series; British F4 Esports Championship	Precision Racing League GT3 Sprint Series; Ferrari Esports Series (2023)
(United Kingdom) Graham Carroll	2024–	British F4 Esports Championship; FIA F4 Esports Global Championship	British F4 Esports Championship
(Hungary) Patrik Sipos	2024–	F1 Sim Racing	none
(Norway) Daniel Kjeldsen	2024–	F1 Sim Racing	none
(United Kingdom) John Evans	2024–	F1 Sim Racing	none
(Norway) Ole Steinbråten	2025–	IMSA Esports Global Championship	none
(Italy) Lorenzo Manfredotti	2025–	IMSA Esports Global Championship	none
(Spain) Daniel Lafuente	2025–	IMSA Esports Global Championship	none
(Italy) Michele Constantini	2025–	iRacing Special Events	none
(Germany) Niklas Beu	2025–	iRacing Special Events	none
(Spain) Ismael Fahssi	2025–	F1 Sim Racing	none
(Italy) Angelo D'Ortensio	2025–	F1 Sim Racing	none
(Australia) Gregory Przybyl	2026–	F1 Sim Racing	none

=== Former FDA Esports drivers ===
Driver	Years	Series competed in	Titles as FDA Esports member
(Italy) Amos Laurito	2019	F1 Esports; SRO GT World Challenge Europe Endurance Cup	GT World Challenge Esports Europe Endurance Cup (2021)
(Italy) Gianfranco Giglioli	2019	F1 Esports	None
(Italy) Enzo Bonito	2020	F1 Esports; SRO E-Sport GT Series Championship	None
(Slovakia) Filip Prešnajder	2020	F1 Esports	None
(Italy) Domenico Lovece	2021	F1 Esports	None
(Italy) David Tonizza	2019–2022	F1 Esports; SRO GT World Challenge Esports Europe; SRO Intercontinental GT Challenge Esports	F1 Esports (2019); SRO GT World Challenge Esports Europe Endurance Cup (2021)
(Italy) Giovanni De Salvo	2021–2022	SRO GT World Challenge Esports Europe; SRO Intercontinental GT Challenge Esports	Ferrari Esports Series (2020); SRO GT World Challenge Esports Europe Endurance Cup (2021)
(United Kingdom) Brendon Leigh	2021–2022	F1 Esports	None
(Hungary) Bence Szabó-Kónyi	2021–2022	F1 Esports	None
(Denmark) Kasper Stoltze	2021–2023	Le Mans Virtual Series	None
(Netherlands) Jordy Zwiers	2021–2023	Le Mans Virtual Series	None
(Denmark) Martin Dyrlund	2021–2023	Le Mans Virtual Series	None
(Chile) Fabrizio Donoso	2022	F1 Esports	None
(Poland) Kamil Pawłowski	2022	SRO GT World Challenge Esports Europe; SRO Intercontinental GT Challenge Esports	Ferrari Esports Series (2021)
(Italy) Danilo Santoro	2022	SRO Intercontinental GT Challenge Esports	None
(Italy) Daniel Savini	2022	SRO Intercontinental GT Challenge Esports	None
(Germany) Christian Michel	2022–2023	Le Mans Virtual Series	None
(France) Hugo Merlhes	2022	SRO Intercontinental GT Challenge Esports	None
(Germany) Sven Zurner	2022	F1 Esports	None
(United States) Chandler Seita	2022	F1 Esports	None
(Italy) Andrea Capoccia	2023	SRO Intercontinental GT Challenge Esports	None
(South Africa) Jordan Sherratt	2023	SRO Intercontinental GT Challenge Esports; SRO Esports Sim Pro Series	None
(Germany) Alex Siebel	2023–2024	rFactor 2 GT Challenge; Formula SimRacing World Championship; Virtual Endurance Championship	Virtual Endurance Championship
(Poland) Tomek Poradzisz	2023–2024	F1 Sim Racing	None
(Germany) Dennis Jordan	2023–2024	rFactor 2 GT Challenge; Formula SimRacing World Championship; Virtual Endurance Championship	rFactor 2 GT Challenge; Virtual Endurance Championship
(United Kingdom) Jonathan Riley	2023–2025	SRO Intercontinental GT Challenge Esports	Ferrari Esports Series (2022)
(Netherlands) Chris Harteveld	2023–2025	SRO Intercontinental GT Challenge Esports; SRO Esports Sim Pro Series	SRO Esports Sim Pro Series
(France) Nicolas Longuet	2023–2025	F1 Sim Racing	None
(Lithuania) Grantas Kareckas	2024	SRO Intercontinental GT Challenge Esports	None
(Hungary) István Puki	2024	F1 Sim Racing	None
(North Macedonia) Timotej Andonovski	2023–2024	rFactor 2 GT Challenge; Virtual Endurance Championship	Virtual Endurance Championship
(Russia) Mikhail Statsenko	2024	SRO Intercontinental GT Challenge Esports	None
(Netherlands) Maarten van Loozenoord	2025	iRacing Special Events	None
(United Kingdom) Luke Whitehead	2025	LFM Pro Series	Ferrari Esports Series (2024)

=== Complete F1 Esports Series results ===
Year	Chassis	Drivers	1	2	3	4	5	6	7	8	9	10	11	12	Points	WCC
2019	Ferrari SF90		BHR	CHN	AZE	CAN	RBR	GBR	GER	BEL	ITA	JPN	USA	BRA	184	2nd
2019	Ferrari SF90	(Italy) David Tonizza	1	1	3	8	1	5	3	4	3	4	6	2	184	2nd
2019	Ferrari SF90	(Italy) Amos Laurito	16	16	13	19	16		19	17		20	17		184	2nd
2019	Ferrari SF90	(Italy) Gianfranco Giglioli						17			16			15	184	2nd
2020	Ferrari SF1000		BHR	VIE	CHN	NED	CAN	RBR	GBR	BEL	ITA	JPN	MEX	BRA	100	5th
2020	Ferrari SF1000	(Italy) David Tonizza	20	1	19	11	Ret	10	5	8	1	7	Ret	6	100	5th
2020	Ferrari SF1000	(Italy) Enzo Bonito	14	7	20	10	11	11	8		5	14	11	19	100	5th
2020	Ferrari SF1000	(Slovakia) Filip Prešnajder								11					100	5th
2021	Ferrari SF21		BHR	CHN	RBR	GBR	ITA	BEL	POR	NED	USA	EMI	MEX	BRA	125	4th
2021	Ferrari SF21	(Italy) David Tonizza	9	14	5	10	15	3	6	5	5	1	9		125	4th
2021	Ferrari SF21	(United Kingdom) Brendon Leigh	12	6	8	6	19	18	17	9	11	5	5	18	125	4th
2021	Ferrari SF21	(Italy) Domenico Lovece												11	125	4th
2022	Ferrari F1-75		BHR	EMI	GBR	RBR	BEL	NED	ITA	MEX	USA	JPN	BRA	ABU	79	7th
2022	Ferrari F1-75	(United Kingdom) Brendon Leigh	7	19^{F}	7	11		6	15	9	3	6	17^{F}	8	79	7th
2022	Ferrari F1-75	(Italy) David Tonizza		8		16	9		12	Ret				5	79	7th
2022	Ferrari F1-75	(Chile) Fabrizio Donoso	14		9		11	14			19	9	5		79	7th
2023–24	Ferrari SF-23		BHR	SAU	RBR	GBR	BEL	NED	USA	MEX	BRA	LVG	QAT	ABU	253	1st
2023–24	Ferrari SF-23	(Iran) Bari Broumand	5^{F}	17	10	11	1^{P}	2	2	2^{P}	Ret	1	1^{P}	7	253	1st
2023–24	Ferrari SF-23	(France) Nicolas Longuet	3	8	6	2	13	20^{P}	18	5	13	2^{P}	2	5	253	1st
2025	Ferrari SF-24		AUS	CHN	BHR	SAU	GBR	BEL	NED	USA	MEX	BRA	QAT	ABU	207	2nd
2025	Ferrari SF-24	(Iran) Bari Broumand	17	Ret	1	13	7	15	1^{P}	2	2	12	1^{P}	3	207	2nd
2025	Ferrari SF-24	(France) Nicolas Longuet	19	7	13	7	4	12	5^{F}	9	6	9	2	6	207	2nd

== See also ==
- Scuderia Ferrari
- Formula Abarth
- Formula Future Fiat
