= Ian Rodríguez =

Guatemalan racing driver (born 2003)

- Nationality: Guatemala
- Born: 28 July 2000 (age 26) Guatemala City, Guatemala

Formula Regional European Championship career
- Debut season: 2020
- Current team: DR Formula RP Motorsport
- Categorisation: FIA Silver
- Car number: 45
- Starts: 3
- Wins: 1
- Podiums: 2
- Poles: 0
- Fastest laps: 0
- Best finish: 13th in 2020

Previous series
- 2019 2016–19: Indy Pro 2000 Championship; Italian F4 Championship

Ian Geoffrey Rodríguez Wright (born 28 July 2000) is a Guatemalan racing driver who is currently driving in the Formula Regional Americas Championship for Newman Wachs Racing.

== Career ==
=== Karting ===
Born in Guatemala City, Rodríguez started his karting career in 2010. He competed in karts for four years and won the 2012 Easykart International Grand Finals.

=== Lower formulae ===
In 2016, Rodríguez made his single-seater racing debut in the Italian F4 Championship with DRZ Benelli. In 2017, he won a race at Vallelunga, and after another podium in the final race of the season at Monza, Rodríguez finished seventh in the drivers' standings. He stayed on with the team for another year of Italian F4. Rodríguez fell back in the championship, with ninth in the standings, however he did finish on the podium thrice that season.

In 2019, Rodríguez made a one-off appearance in the Italian series, finishing in the points in two of the three races he competed in.

=== Indy Pro 2000 Championship ===
Rodríguez made his Indy Pro 2000 Championship debut at Indianapolis with RP Motorsport Racing. He raced in four weekends and scored two podiums. The Guatemalan finished 13th in the standings.

=== Formula Regional European Championship ===
In 2020, Rodríguez made his debut in the Formula Regional European Championship for DP Formula RP Motorsport in a cameo appearance at Imola. He managed to surprise everyone, winning the first race of the weekend and getting second place in race two. At the end of the year, Rodríguez had scored 45 points and finished 13th in the championship.

== Karting record ==
=== Karting career summary ===
Season	Series	Team	Position
2010	Rotax Max Challenge Pan American - Micro Max		
2010	Easykart International Grand Final - Easykart 60	La Llave	
2012	Trofeo Italiano Easykart - 60cc		10th
2012	Easykart Int. Grand Final - Easykart 60	Mazzotti Corse	1st
2013	Easykart Int. Grand Finals - Easykart 100	Mazzotti Corse	7th

== Racing record ==
=== Racing career summary ===
Season	Series	Team	Races	Wins	Poles	F/Laps	Podiums	Points	Position
2015	Italian F4 Championship	DRZ Benelli	3	0	0	0	0	0	28th
2016	Italian F4 Championship	DRZ Benelli	18	0	0	0	1	43	17th
2017	Italian F4 Championship	DRZ Benelli	21	1	0	0	2	115	7th
2018	Italian F4 Championship	DRZ Benelli	14	0	0	0	3	78	9th
2019	Italian F4 Championship	DRZ Benelli	3	0	0	0	0	13	21st
2019	Indy Pro 2000 Championship	RP Motorsport Racing	8	0	0	1	2	132	13th
2020	Formula Regional European Championship	DR Formula RP Motorsport	3	1	0	0	2	45	13th
2021	Formula Regional Americas Championship	Newman Wachs Racing	10	1	0	0	3	92	8th
2022	Le Mans Cup - LMP3	Team Virage	5	0	0	0	0	0	NC
2022	European Le Mans Series - LMP2	Team Virage	3	0	0	0	0	0	29th
2023	European Le Mans Series - LMP2 Pro/Am	Team Virage	6	0	1	1	0	24	16th
2024	GT Cup Open Europe - Pro-Am	SP Racing	2	0	0	0	0	0	27th*
2024	Italian GT Sprint Championship - GT Cup Pro-Am Division 2	SP Racing	4	0	1	0	2	32	NC‡
2025	GT Cup Open Europe	Faems Team							
2026	Italian GT Championship Sprint Cup - GT3	FAEMS Team	8	0	0	0	1	39	6th
2026	GT Cup Open Europe	Ebimotors							
2026	International GT Open	FAEMS Team - Nova Race by Ebimotors	1	0	0	0	0	8	35th

* Season still in progress.
‡ Not eligible due to championship rules.

=== Complete Italian F4 Championship results ===
(key) (Races in bold indicate pole position) (Races in italics indicate fastest lap)

Year	Team	1	2	3	4	5	6	7	8	9	10	11	12	13	14	15	16	17	18	19	20	21	22	23	Pos	Points
2015	DRZ Benelli	VLL; 1	VLL; 2	VLL; 3	MNZ; 1	MNZ; 2	MNZ; 3	IMO1; 1	IMO1; 2	IMO1; 3	MUG; 1	MUG; 2	MUG; 3	ADR; 1	ADR; 2	ADR; 3	IMO2; 1; 16	IMO2; 2; 10	IMO2; 3; 22	MIS; 1	MIS; 2	MIS; 3			28th	0
2016	DRZ Benelli	MIS; 1; 22	MIS; 2	MIS; 3; 8	MIS; 4; 25	ADR; 1	ADR; 2; 6	ADR; 3; 5	ADR; 4; 14	IMO1; 1; 14	IMO1; 2 Ret	IMO1; 3; 22	MUG; 1 Ret	MUG; 2 Ret	MUG; 3; 21	VLL; 1	VLL; 2	VLL; 3	IMO2; 1; 24	IMO2; 2 Ret	IMO2; 3; 12	MNZ; 1; 8	MNZ; 2; 6	MNZ; 3; 3	17th	43
2017	DRZ Benelli	MIS; 1; 7	MIS; 2; 18	MIS; 3; 7	ADR; 1; 8	ADR; 2; 10	ADR; 3; 8	VLL; 1; 1	VLL; 2; 8	VLL; 3; 6	MUG1; 1; 16	MUG1; 2; 10	MUG1; 3; 9	IMO; 1; 6	IMO; 2; 8	IMO; 3; 19	MUG2; 1; 12	MUG2; 2; 5	MUG2; 3 Ret	MNZ; 1; 4	MNZ; 2; 13	MNZ; 3; 2			7th	115
2018	DRZ Benelli	ADR; 1; 6	ADR; 2; 6	ADR; 3 Ret	LEC; 1; 6	LEC; 2; 7	LEC; 3 DNS	MNZ; 1; 15	MNZ; 2; 3	MNZ; 3 Ret	MIS; 1; 3	MIS; 2; 3	MIS; 3 Ret	IMO; 1; 10	IMO; 2; 9	IMO; 3; 12	VLL; 1 WD	VLL; 2 WD	VLL; 3 WD	MUG; 1	MUG; 2	MUG; 3			9th	78
2019	DRZ Benelli	VLL; 1	VLL; 2	VLL; 3	MIS; 1	MIS; 2	MIS; 3	HUN; 1	HUN; 2	HUN; 3	RBR; 1	RBR; 2	RBR; 3	IMO; 1	IMO; 2	IMO; 3	IMO; 4	MUG; 1	MUG; 2	MUG; 3	MNZ; 1; 16	MNZ; 2; 10	MNZ; 3; 4		21st	13

=== Complete Indy Pro 2000 Championship results ===
(key) (Races in bold indicate pole position) (Races in italics indicate fastest lap)

Year	Team	1	2	3	4	5	6	7	8	9	10	11	12	13	14	15	16	DC	Points
2019	RP Motorsport Racing	STP	STP	IMS; 14	IMS; 12	LOR	ROA; 2	ROA; 4	TOR; 5	TOR; 6	MOH; 3	MOH; 5	GMP	POR	POR	LAG	LAG	13th	132

=== Complete Formula Regional European Championship results ===
(key) (Races in bold indicate pole position) (Races in italics indicate fastest lap)

Year	Team	1	2	3	4	5	6	7	8	9	10	11	12	13	14	15	16	17	18	19	20	21	22	23	24	DC	Points
2020	DR Formula RP Motorsport	MIS; 1	MIS; 2	MIS; 3	LEC; 1	LEC; 2	LEC; 3	RBR; 1	RBR; 2	RBR; 3	MUG; 1	MUG; 2	MUG; 3	MNZ; 1	MNZ; 2	MNZ; 3	CAT; 1	CAT; 2	CAT; 3	IMO; 1; 1	IMO; 2; 2	IMO; 3; 9	VLL; 1	VLL; 2	VLL; 3	13th	45

=== Complete Formula Regional Americas Championship results ===
(key) (Races in bold indicate pole position) (Races in italics indicate fastest lap)

Year	Team	1	2	3	4	5	6	7	8	9	10	11	12	13	14	15	16	17	18	DC	Points
2021	Newman Wachs Racing	ATL; 1 Ret	ATL; 2 DNS	ATL; 3 DNS	ROA; 1; 2	ROA; 2; 10	ROA; 3; 2	MOH; 1; 11	MOH; 2; 6	MOH; 3; 5	BRA; 1; 1	BRA; 2; 4	BRA; 3 Ret	VIR; 1	VIR; 2	VIR; 3	COA; 1	COA; 2	COA; 3	8th	92

=== Complete European Le Mans Series results ===
Year	Entrant	Class	Chassis	Engine	1	2	3	4	5	6	Rank	Points
2022	Team Virage	LMP2	Oreca 07	Gibson GK428 4.2 L V8	LEC	IMO	MNZ	CAT; 14	SPA; 14	ALG; NC	29th	0
2023	Team Virage	LMP2 Pro-Am	Oreca 07	Gibson GK428 4.2 L V8	CAT; 9	LEC; NC	ARA; 6	SPA; 5	**ALG**; 9	ALG; 10	16th	24
