= Emidio Pesce =

Italian racing driver

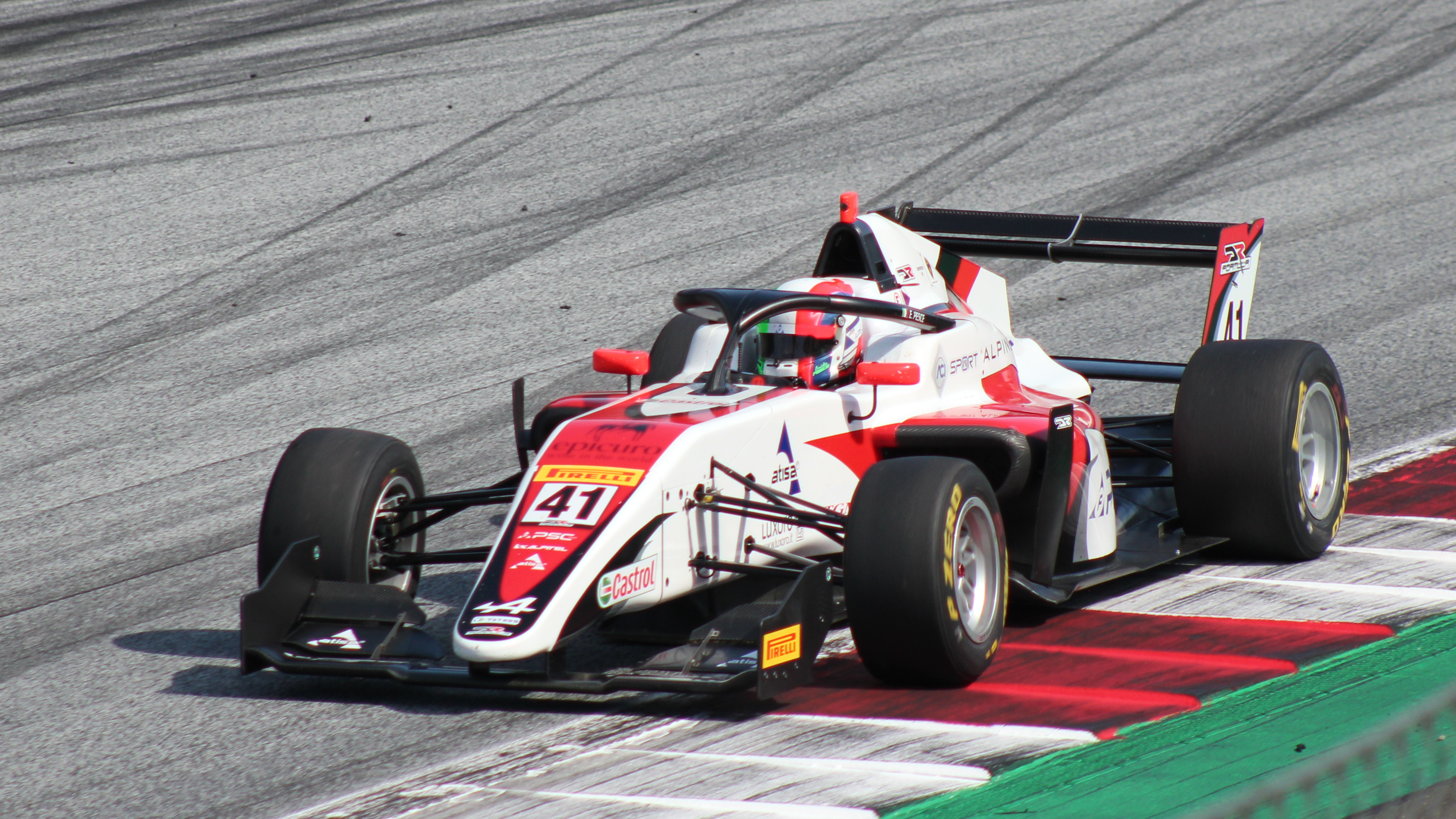
- Pesce at the Red Bull Ring
- Nationality: (Italy) Italian
- Born: 16 March 2002 (age 24) Marino, Italy

FR European Championship career
- Debut season: 2020
- Current team: DR Formula
- Starts: 29 (32 entries)
- Wins: 0
- Podiums: 0
- Poles: 0
- Fastest laps: 0
- Best finish: 12th in 2020

Previous series
- 2019 2019: F4 Spanish Championship; Italian F4 Championship

Emidio Pesce (born 16 March 2002) is an Italian racing driver currently racing in the Italian GT Championship with Antonelli Motorsport. He previously competed in the Formula Regional European Championship.

== Career ==
=== Formula 4 ===
Pesce's first season in single-seaters was in 2019, when he competed in the Italian and Spanish F4 seasons with Jenzer. His first round of the season was at Circuit Paul Ricard in the Spanish F4 season, where he finished ninth and 11th respectively and retired in the third race. He only raced one more time in the Spanish series at Barcelona, where he scored his only point. Pesce finished the season 19th.

Pesce raced the whole Italian F4 season, where he failed to score points, with his highest finish of 14th coming at Monza.

=== Formula Regional European Championship ===
Pesce moved up to the Formula Regional European Championship for the 2020 season, with DR Formula RP Motorsport, completing the full season. He scored 50 points in 22 starts and finished 12th in the championship.

==== 2021 ====
Pesce stayed in the championship with the same team for the 2021 season. He didn't manage to score any points, finishing 37th and last of all full-time drivers.

== Racing record ==
=== Career summary ===
Season	Series	Team	Races	Wins	Poles	F/Laps	Podiums	Points	Position
2019	Italian F4 Championship	Jenzer Motorsport	21	0	0	0	0	0	32nd
2019	Spanish F4 Championship	Jenzer Motorsport	6	0	0	0	0	1	19th
2020	Formula Regional European Championship	DR Formula RP Motorsport	22	0	0	0	0	50	12th
2021	Formula Regional European Championship	DR Formula	19	0	0	0	0	0	37th
2022	Italian GT Championship - GT3	Antonelli Motorsport	8	0	0	0	0	13	13th

* Season still in progress.

=== Complete Italian F4 Championship results ===
(key) (Races in bold indicate pole position) (Races in italics indicate fastest lap)

Year	Team	1	2	3	4	5	6	7	8	9	10	11	12	13	14	15	16	17	18	19	20	21	22	Pos	Points
2019	Jenzer Motorsport	VLL; 1; 15	VLL; 2; 26	VLL; 3; 19	MIS; 1; 27	MIS; 2; 25	MIS; 3 C	HUN; 1; 28	HUN; 2; 22	HUN; 3; 16	RBR; 1; 26	RBR; 2 Ret	RBR; 3; 25	IMO; 1; 20	IMO; 2; 20	IMO; 3; 22	IMO; 4; 18	MUG; 1; 17	MUG; 2; 19	MUG; 3; 21	MNZ; 1; 21	MNZ; 2; 25	MNZ; 3; 14	32nd	0

=== Complete F4 Spanish Championship results ===
(key) (Races in bold indicate pole position) (Races in italics indicate fastest lap)

Year	Team	1	2	3	4	5	6	7	8	9	10	11	12	13	14	15	16	17	18	19	20	21	Pos	Points
2019	Jenzer Motorsport	NAV; 1	NAV; 2	NAV; 3	LEC; 1; 9	LEC; 2; 11	LEC; 3 Ret	ARA; 1	ARA; 2	ARA; 3	CRT; 1	CRT; 2	CRT; 3	JER; 1	JER; 2	JER; 3	ALG; 1	ALG; 2	ALG; 3	CAT; 1; 12	CAT; 2; 17	CAT; 3; 16	19th	1

=== Complete Formula Regional European Championship results ===
(key) (Races in bold indicate pole position) (Races in italics indicate fastest lap)

Year	Team	1	2	3	4	5	6	7	8	9	10	11	12	13	14	15	16	17	18	19	20	21	22	23	24	DC	Points
2020	DR Formula RP Motorsport	MIS; 1; 7	MIS; 2; 11	MIS; 3 Ret	LEC; 1; 11	LEC; 2; 11†	LEC; 3 DNS	RBR; 1; 8	RBR; 2; 8	RBR; 3; 9	MUG; 1 Ret	MUG; 2; 8	MUG; 3; 9	MNZ; 1; 8	MNZ; 2; 7	MNZ; 3; 7	CAT; 1; 11	CAT; 2; 11	CAT; 3; 11	IMO; 1; 10	IMO; 2; 11	IMO; 3; 7	VLL; 1; 9	VLL; 2 C	VLL; 3; 10	12th	50
2021	DR Formula	IMO; 1 NC	IMO; 2; 24	CAT; 1 Ret	CAT; 2; 24	MCO; 1 DNQ	MCO; 2; 20	LEC; 1; 24	LEC; 2; 22	ZAN; 1; 25	ZAN; 2; 23	SPA; 1 Ret	SPA; 2; 26	RBR; 1; 21	RBR; 2; 23	VAL; 1; 25	VAL; 2; 30	MUG; 1 Ret	MUG; 2; 25	MNZ; 1; 27	MNZ; 2; 25					37th	0

^{†} Driver did not finish the race, but was classified, as they completed more than 90% of the race distance.
