= Oliver Rasmussen =

Danish racing driver (born 2000)

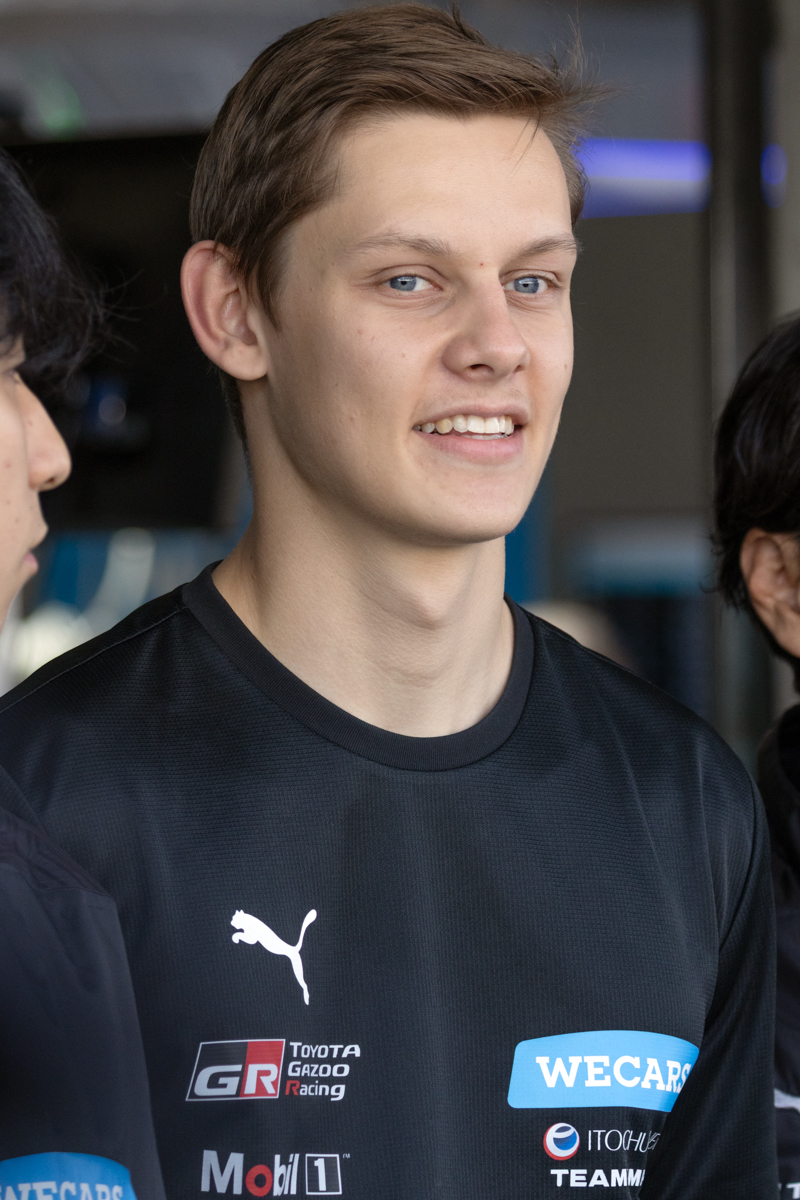
- Rasmussen at Suzuka Circuit in November 2025
- Nationality: (Denmark) Danish
- Born: 6 November 2000 (age 26) Grasse, France

Super GT - GT300 career
- Debut season: 2025
- Current team: apr
- Categorisation: FIA Silver (2022); FIA Gold (2023–)
- Car number: 31
- Starts: 8
- Wins: 0
- Podiums: 0
- Poles: 0
- Best finish: 28th in 2025

Previous series
- 2024 2022-2023 2021-2022 2020 2020 2018–19 2019: FIA World Endurance Championship - Hypercar; FIA World Endurance Championship - LMP2; FIA Formula 3 Championship; FR European; Toyota Racing Series; Italian F4 Championship; ADAC Formula 4

Oliver Rasmussen (born 6 November 2000) is a Danish racing driver who most recently competed in the Super Formula for Team Impul and the GT300 class of Super GT for Apr.

== Early career ==
=== Italian F4 ===
==== 2018 ====
Rasmussen started his single-seater career off with Jenzer Motorsport at the opening round of the 2018 Italian F4 Championship. Rasmussen completed the first ten races with four retirements and a best finish of 11th, a string of three retirements in a row starting at Monza's second race left Rasmussen the only one of the six Jenzer drivers without a point. In race 2 at the Misano round, a season best finish of eighth ended Rasmussen's points drought. Things were looking good for him until the third race he sustained a heavy crash with Prema driver Amna Al Qubaisi. The closest Rasmussen got to the points was a 13th-place finish, he ended the season 24th and last of his teammates.

==== 2019 ====
Rasmussen returned for the following season but this time for Prema Powerteam and with his first race of the season he beat his entire tally from the previous year. In the second race, Rasmussen was handed a ten-second penalty for overtaking under the safety car resulting in a 14th-place finish. Despite a lot of good results, including three fourth places and a pole position at Imola it took until the final round of the season for Rasmussen to take a podium where he placed third in the first and third race at Monza. Before his double podium, Rasmussen was tenth in the championship but ended up finishing seventh, six points behind his nearest competitor.

=== ADAC F4 ===
Rasmussen raced with Prema Powerteam in the ADAC Formula 4 in 2019. The first round of the season got off to a bad start, as he retired after he sustained damage crashing into Prema teammate Paul Aron. A handful of good results and points followed before he scored a career best second and first podium of the season at Zandvoort due to Dennis Hauger and Gianluca Petecof crashing in the later stages of the race. Rasmussen went on to finish on the podium once more and end the season in 12th behind Paraguayan Joshua Dürksen.

=== Toyota Racing Series ===
mtec Motorsport and Rasmussen joined forced as he entered the Toyota Racing Series for the first time in 2020. He finished 11th with two podiums, one fastest lap and 158 points. His best result was second, a race in which he shared the podium with FIA Formula 1 driver Yuki Tsunoda and FIA Formula 3 driver Lirim Zendeli.

=== FIA Formula 3 Championship ===
==== 2021 ====
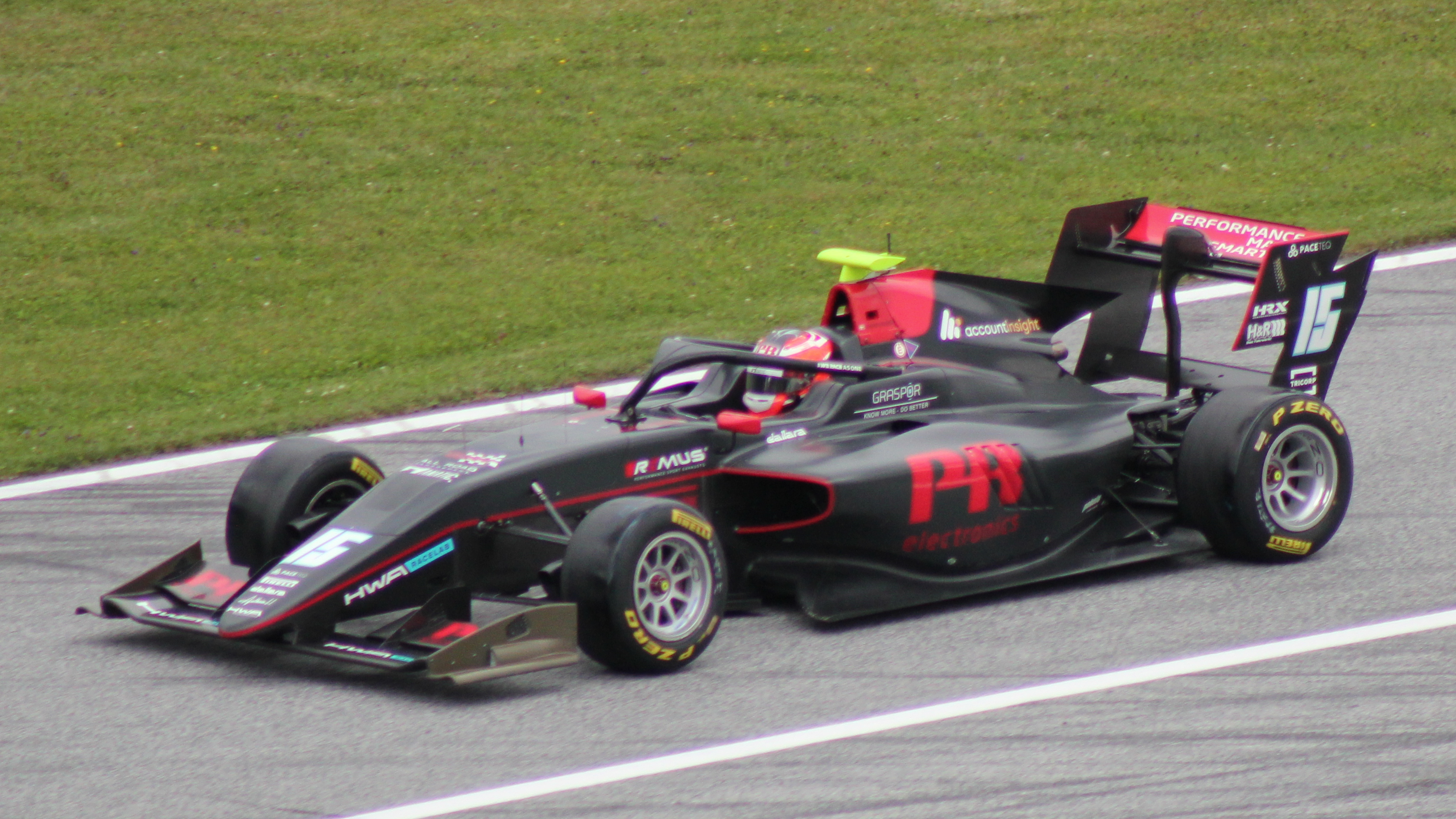
Rasmussen at the 2021 Spielberg Formula 3 round

On 5 February 2021, Rasmussen confirmed that he would be moving up to the FIA Formula 3 Championship with HWA Racelab to partner Matteo Nannini and Rafael Villagómez. He did not score any points and achieved a best finish of 12th, during sprint race 2 at Zandvoort.

==== 2022 ====
Rasmussen then drove for Charouz Racing System and ART Grand Prix in the post-season test, but did not sign for either team in 2022, instead switching to the FIA World Endurance Championship. On 4 April 2022, however, it was announced that Rasmussen would be joining teams' champions Trident from round 2 after an ill-fated Jonny Edgar pulled out of the championship. In just his first time back, he achieved his first points finish by finishing seventh. He would not score any more points for the feature race and the Barcelona round.

Rasmussen was replaced at Silverstone by Edgar after the Brit recovered from his health issues. Rasmussen ranked 22nd in the standings with four points.

== Sportscar career ==
=== WEC - LMP2 ===
==== 2022 ====
On 12 January 2022, Jota Sport announced that Rasmussen would join the team and drive the 28 car alongside Ed Jones and Johnathan Aberdein in the FIA World Endurance Championship. The team started out with a fifth place at Sebring, before a retirement at Spa-Francorchamps posed a setback for Rasmussen and his teammates. They would bounce back in strong fashion at the 24 Hours of Le Mans however, as the Jota 28 crew took a class podium, ending up third at the checkered flag. Rasmussen, Aberdein and Jones scored another third place at the penultimate race in Fuji and finished sixth in the teams' standings.

==== 2023 ====
For the 2023 season, Rasmussen remained with Jota, being partnered by Pietro Fittipaldi and David Heinemeier Hansson. Following three finishes inside the top-ten during the first half of the season, the No. 28 crew qualified second ahead of the 24 Hours of Le Mans. However, having run near the front during the evening, Rasmussen span and hit the barriers, damaging the front of his car and diminishing Jota's chances of victory. Contact from another car saw Fittipaldi stranded in the gravel at the first Mulsanne Chicane four hours later, costing the team more time and leading them on to finish 13th in class.

A highlight of the campaign proved to be the race at Monza: the team took an early lead with Heinemeier Hansson at the wheel and ran at the front for a majority of the contest, with Rasmussen executing a pass on Fabio Scherer to momentarily take third. With fellow front runners WRT having to retire thirty minutes from the end, Jota were able to win unopposed, as Fittipaldi crossed the line to give Rasmussen his first victory in sportscar racing. Another podium came at the final round in Bahrain, as the No. 28 crew benefited from a collision the No. 9 Prema suffered with a GT car. This helped the team towards a sixth place in the championship standings by the end of the year.

=== WEC - Hypercar ===
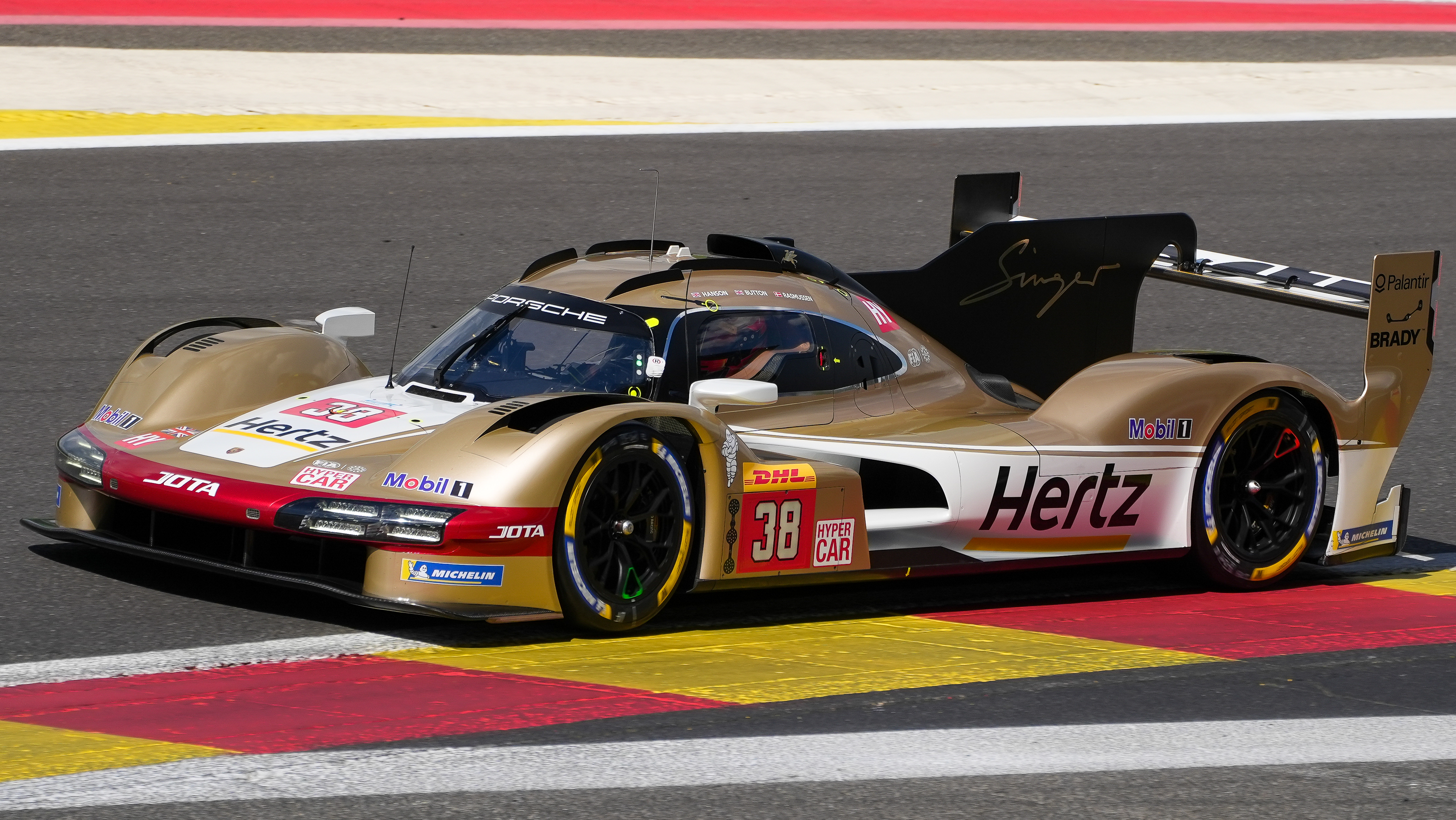
Rasmussen driving at the 2024 6 Hours of Spa-Francorchamps

Rasmussen continued with Jota for the 2024 season, stepping up to compete in the Hypercar entry of the team, alongside Jenson Button and Phil Hanson.

=== Super GT ===
==== GT300 ====
Rasmussen was not renewed by Jota for the following season, and he moved to Japan to make his debut in Super GT, in the GT300 class with apr. He would drive the Lexus LC500h GT with Miki Koyama and third driver Yuki Nemoto.

== Other racing ==
=== 2025: Super Formula ===
Rasmussen switched to Super Formula for 2025, driving for Team Impul alongside Mitsunori Takaboshi. However, during the first practice session for the season opener at the Suzuka Circuit, Rasmussen crashed heavily at Degner and suffered a fracture of his lumbar vertebrae. As a result of his injury, he was replaced by Impul with Seita Nonaka and later Rikuto Kobayashi.

== Karting record ==
=== Karting career summary ===
Season	Series	Team	Position
2016	Rotax International Open — Senior		9th
2016	Rotax Max Wintercup — Senior	Jana Racing	22nd
2017	WSK Final Cup — KZ2	Kosmic Racing Departement	7th
2017	CIK-FIA European Championship — KZ2	Kosmic Racing Departement	25th
2017	Swedish Karting Championship — KZ2		6th
2018	CIK-FIA European Championship — KZ2	Kosmic Racing Departement	11th
2018	WSK Master Series — KZ2		45th

== Racing record ==
=== Racing career summary ===
Season	Series	Team	Races	Wins	Poles	F/Laps	Podiums	Points	Position
2018	Italian F4 Championship	Jenzer Motorsport	20	0	0	0	0	4	24th
2019	Italian F4 Championship	Prema Powerteam	21	0	2	1	2	126	7th
2019	ADAC Formula 4 Championship	Prema Powerteam	20	0	0	0	2	76	12th
2020	Formula Regional European Championship	Prema Powerteam	23	6	5	3	13	343	**3rd**
2020	Toyota Racing Series	mtec Motorsport	15	0	0	1	2	158	11th
2021	FIA Formula 3 Championship	HWA Racelab	20	0	0	0	0	0	25th
2022	FIA World Endurance Championship - LMP2	Jota Sport	6	0	0	0	2	70	8th
2022	24 Hours of Le Mans - LMP2	Jota Sport	1	0	0	0	0	N/A	**3rd**
2022	IMSA SportsCar Championship - LMP2	G-Drive Racing by APR	1	0	0	0	0	0	NC†
2022	FIA Formula 3 Championship	Trident	4	0	0	0	0	4	22nd
2023	FIA World Endurance Championship - LMP2	Jota Sport	7	1	1	0	2	84	6th
2023	24 Hours of Le Mans - LMP2	Jota Sport	1	0	0	0	0	N/A	13th
2023-24	Asian Le Mans Series - LMP2	Duqueine Team	3	0	0	0	0	6	15th
2024	FIA World Endurance Championship - Hypercar	Hertz Team Jota	8	0	0	0	0	28	19th
2024	24 Hours of Le Mans - Hypercar	Hertz Team Jota	1	0	0	0	0	N/A	9th
2025	Super Formula	Itochu Enex Wecars Team Impul	8	0	0	0	0	0	21st
2025	Super GT - GT300	apr	8	0	0	0	0	4	28th

† As Rasmussen was a guest driver, he was ineligible for points.
^{*} Season still in progress.

=== Complete Italian F4 Championship results ===
(key) (Races in bold indicate pole position) (Races in italics indicate fastest lap)

Year	Team	1	2	3	4	5	6	7	8	9	10	11	12	13	14	15	16	17	18	19	20	21	22	Pos	Points
2018	Jenzer Motorsport	ADR; 1; 18	ADR; 2 Ret	ADR; 3; 18	LEC; 1; 14	LEC; 2; 19	LEC; 3; 17	MNZ; 1; 11	MNZ; 2 Ret	MNZ; 3 Ret	MIS; 1 Ret	MIS; 2; 8	MIS; 3 Ret	IMO; 1; 18	IMO; 2 Ret	IMO; 3; 20	VLL; 1; 14	VLL; 2; 19	VLL; 3; 14	MUG; 1; 13	MUG; 2 Ret	MUG; 3; 25		24th	4
2019	Prema Powerteam	VLL; 1; 6	VLL; 2; 14	VLL; 3; 7	MIS; 1; 5	MIS; 2; 4	**MIS**; **3** C	HUN; 1; 30	HUN; 2; 6	HUN; 3; 6	RBR; 1; 10	RBR; 2 Ret	RBR; 3; 11	IMO; 1 Ret	IMO; 2; 8	IMO; 3; 11	**IMO**; **4**; 4	MUG; 1; 4	MUG; 2; 10	MUG; 3; 6	MNZ; 1; 3	MNZ; 2; 7	MNZ; 3; 3	7th	126

=== Complete ADAC Formula 4 Championship results ===
(key) (Races in bold indicate pole position) (Races in italics indicate fastest lap)

Year	Team	1	2	3	4	5	6	7	8	9	10	11	12	13	14	15	16	17	18	19	20	Pos	Points
2019	Prema Powerteam	OSC; 1 Ret	OSC; 2; 12	OSC; 3; 5	RBR; 1; 9	RBR; 2; 10	RBR; 3; 8	HOC; 1; 7	HOC; 2; 11	ZAN; 1; 14	ZAN; 2; 2	ZAN; 3; 9	NÜR; 1; 12	NÜR; 2; 6	NÜR; 3; 3	HOC; 1; 9	HOC; 2; 8	HOC; 3 Ret	SAC; 1; 14	SAC; 2; 12	SAC; 3; 12	12th	76

=== Complete Toyota Racing Series results ===
(key) (Races in bold indicate pole position) (Races in italics indicate fastest lap)

Year	Team	1	2	3	4	5	6	7	8	9	10	11	12	13	14	15	DC	Points
2020	mtec Motorsport	HIG; 1; 6	HIG; 2; 2	HIG; 3; 17	TER; 1; 13	TER; 2; 11	TER; 3 Ret	HMP; 1; 6	HMP; 2; 3	HMP; 3; 9	PUK; 1; 8	PUK; 2; 11	PUK; 3; 11	MAN; 1; 12	MAN; 2; 12	MAN; 3; 12	11th	158

=== Complete Formula Regional European Championship results ===
(key) (Races in bold indicate pole position) (Races in italics indicate fastest lap)

Year	Team	1	2	3	4	5	6	7	8	9	10	11	12	13	14	15	16	17	18	19	20	21	22	23	24	Pos	Points
2020	Prema Powerteam	MIS; 1; 1	MIS; 2; 3	MIS; 3; 3	LEC; 1; 6	LEC; 2; 5	LEC; 3; 4	RBR; 1; 3	RBR; 2; 1	RBR; 3; 3	**MUG**; **1**; 3	MUG; 2; 6	MUG; 3; 3	MNZ; 1; 4	MNZ; 2; 1	MNZ; 3; 4	CAT; 1; 1	CAT; 2; 1	CAT; 3; 5	**IMO**; **1** DNS	IMO; 2; 6	IMO; 3; 6	**VLL**; **1**; 3	**VLL**; **2** C	**VLL**; **3**; 1	3rd	343

=== Complete FIA Formula 3 Championship results ===
(key) (Races in bold indicate pole position; races in italics indicate points for the fastest lap of top ten finishers)

Year	Entrant	1	2	3	4	5	6	7	8	9	10	11	12	13	14	15	16	17	18	19	20	21	DC	Points
2021	HWA Racelab	CAT; 1 Ret	CAT; 2; 19	CAT; 3; 17	LEC; 1; 17	LEC; 2; 21	LEC; 3; 22	RBR; 1; 26	RBR; 2; 16	RBR; 3; 22	HUN; 1; 18	HUN; 2; 28	HUN; 3; 21	SPA; 1; 20	SPA; 2; 21	SPA; 3; 17	ZAN; 1; 18	ZAN; 2; 12	ZAN; 3; 26	SOC; 1 Ret	SOC; 2 C	SOC; 3; 25†	25th	0
2022	Trident	BHR; SPR	BHR; FEA	IMO; SPR; 7	IMO; FEA; Ret	CAT; SPR; 16	CAT; FEA; 14	SIL; SPR	SIL; FEA	RBR; SPR	RBR; FEA	HUN; SPR	HUN; FEA	SPA; SPR	SPA; FEA	ZAN; SPR	ZAN; FEA	MNZ; SPR	MNZ; FEA				22nd	4

=== Complete IMSA SportsCar Championship results ===
(key) (Races in bold indicate pole position; races in italics indicate fastest lap)

Year	Entrant	Class	Make	Engine	1	2	3	4	5	6	7	Rank	Points
2022	G-Drive Racing by APR	LMP2	Aurus 01	Gibson GK428 V8	DAY; 5	SEB	LGA	MDO	WGL	ELK	PET	NC†	0

^{†} Points only counted towards the Michelin Endurance Cup, and not the overall LMP2 Championship.

=== Complete FIA World Endurance Championship results ===
(key) (Races in bold indicate pole position) (Races in italics indicate fastest lap)

Year	Entrant	Class	Chassis	Engine	1	2	3	4	5	6	7	8	Rank	Points
2022	Jota Sport	LMP2	Oreca 07	Gibson GK428 4.2 L V8	SEB; 5	SPA; Ret	LMS; 3	MNZ; 10	FUJ; 3	BHR; 7			8th	70
2023	Jota	LMP2	Oreca 07	Gibson GK428 4.2 L V8	SEB; 5	ALG; 7	SPA; 9	**LMS**; 9	MNZ; 1	FUJ; 6	BHR; 3		6th	84
2024	Hertz Team Jota	Hypercar	Porsche 963	Porsche 9RD 4.6 L Turbo V8	QAT; NC	IMO; 11	SPA; Ret	LMS; 9	SÃO; 7	COA; 10	FUJ; 6	BHR; 7	19th	28

=== Complete 24 Hours of Le Mans results ===
Year	Team	Co-Drivers	Car	Class	Laps	Pos.	Class Pos.
2022	(United Kingdom) Jota Sport	(South Africa) Jonathan Aberdein (United Arab Emirates) Ed Jones	Oreca 07-Gibson	LMP2	368	7th	**3rd**
2023	(United Kingdom) Jota Sport	(Brazil) Pietro Fittipaldi (Denmark) David Heinemeier Hansson	Oreca 07-Gibson	LMP2	316	24th	13th
2024	(United Kingdom) Hertz Team Jota	(United Kingdom) Jenson Button (United Kingdom) Phil Hanson	Porsche 963	Hypercar	311	9th	9th

=== Complete Asian Le Mans Series results ===
(key) (Races in bold indicate pole position) (Races in italics indicate fastest lap)

Year	Team	Class	Car	Engine	1	2	3	4	5	Pos.	Points
2023–24	Duqueine Team	LMP2	Oreca 07	Gibson GK428 4.2 L V8	SEP; 1; 11	SEP; 2; 7	DUB; 1 Ret	ABU; 1	ABU; 2	15th	6

=== Complete Super Formula results ===
Year	Team	Engine	1	2	3	4	5	6	7	8	9	10	11	12	DC	Points
2025	Itochu Enex Wecars Team Impul	Toyota	SUZ; WD	SUZ; WD	MOT	MOT	AUT; 14	FUJ; 16	FUJ; 13	SUG; 17	FUJ; 17	SUZ; 19	SUZ; 21	SUZ; 19	21st	0

^{*} Season still in progress.

=== Complete Super GT results ===
(key) (Races in bold indicate pole position) (Races in italics indicate fastest lap)

Year	Team	Car	Class	1	2	3	4	5	6	7	8	9	DC	Points
2025	apr	Lexus LC 500h GT	GT300	OKA	FUJ; 19	SEP; 12	FS1; 17	FS2 (Ret)	SUZ; 17	SUG; 23†	AUT; DSQ	MOT; 18	28th	4

^{(Number)} Driver did not take part in this sprint race, points are still awarded for the teammate's result.
^{†} Driver did not finish, but was classified as he completed over 90% of the race distance.
