= Gianluca Petecof =

Brazil racing driver (born 2002)

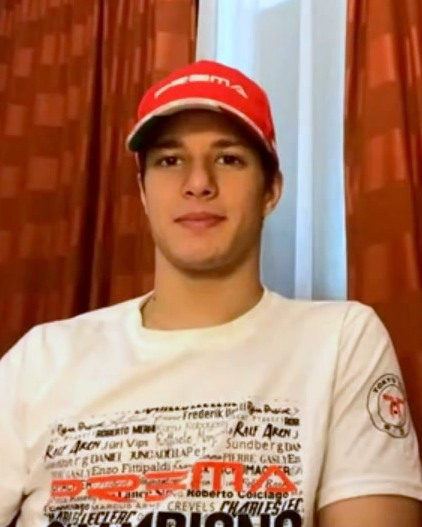
- Petecof in 2020
- Nationality: Brazilian
- Born: Gianluca de Castro Petecof; 14 November 2002 (age 23) São Paulo, Brazil

FIA Formula 2 Championship career
- Debut season: 2021
- Categorisation: FIA Gold
- Car number: 20
- Former teams: Campos Racing
- Starts: 6 (6 entries)
- Wins: 0
- Podiums: 0
- Poles: 0
- Fastest laps: 0
- Best finish: 27th in 2021

Previous series
- 2020 2018-19 2018-19: FR European Championship; Italian F4 Championship; ADAC Formula 4

Championship titles
- 2020: Formula Regional European Championship

Gianluca de Castro Petecof (born 14 November 2002) is a Brazilian racing driver. He last competed full-time in the Brazilian Stock Car Pro Series, driving the No. 101 Mitsubishi Eclipse Cross for KTF Sports. He was champion of the Formula Regional European Championship in 2020, and has competed in the FIA Formula 2 Championship with Campos Racing.

Petecof is a former member of the Ferrari Driver Academy.

== Career ==
=== Lower formulas ===
In 2018, Petecof made his single-seater racing debut in the Italian and ADAC Formula 4 Championships. The former would be more successful for Petecof, with one win and four further podiums helping him to fifth in the standings, meanwhile the Brazilian only scored one podium in ADAC F4 on his way to tenth.

The next year, Petecof continued racing in both Italy and Germany. He won four races and became vice-champion in the Italian series, 136 points behind Dennis Hauger. In ADAC F4 Petecof achieved one victory and finished fifth.

=== Formula Regional European Championship ===
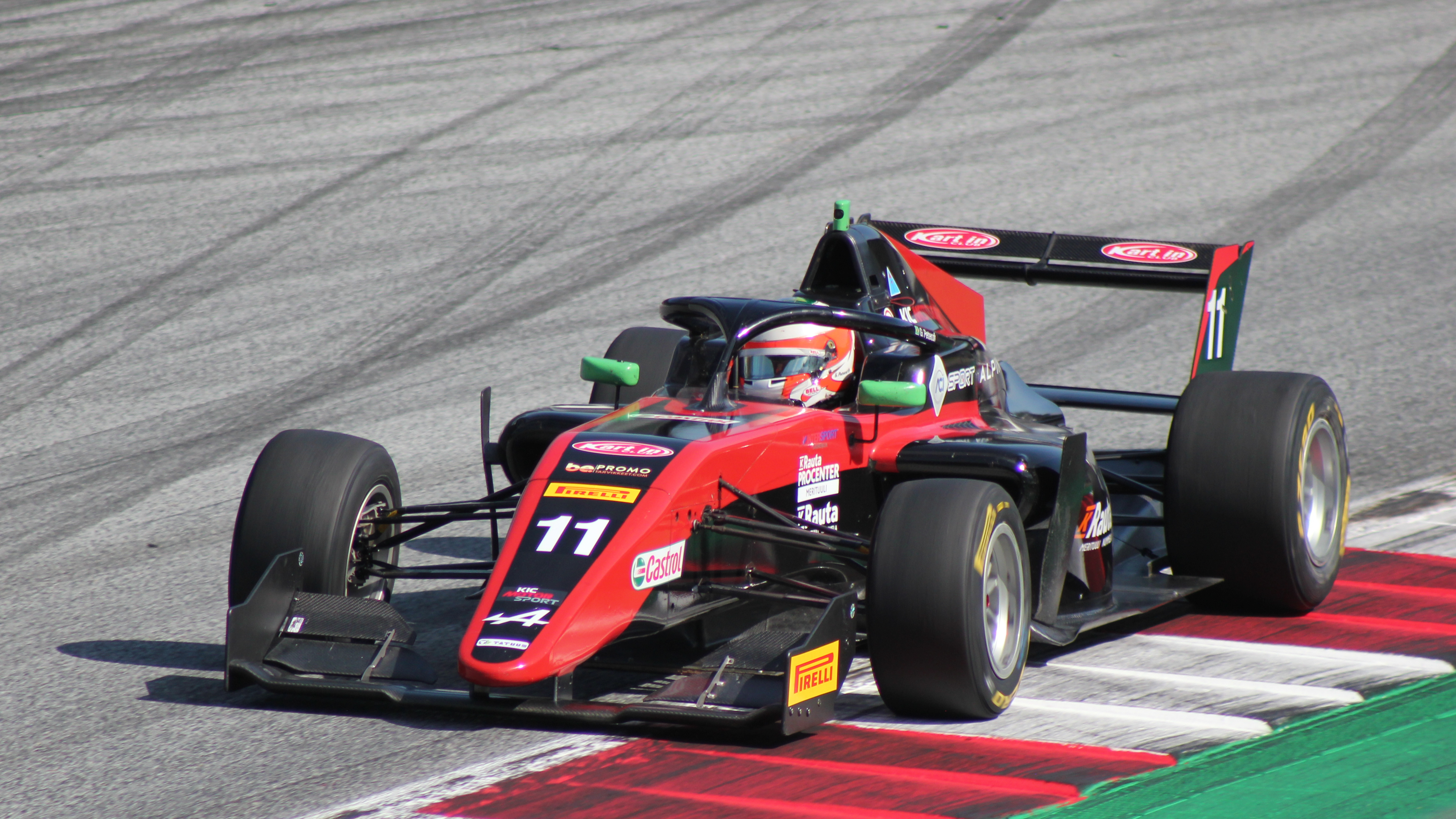
Petecof at the 2021 Formula Regional European Championship

In 2020, Prema Powerteam announced that Petecof would drive for them in the Formula Regional European Championship alongside Jamie Chadwick, Oliver Rasmussen and fellow Ferrari Academy member Arthur Leclerc. Petecof started the season strongly, amassing four victories in the first three rounds. Despite his strong start to the season, Leclerc was able to keep the championship battle going until the last race of the season at Vallelunga, where Petecof was crowned both rookies' and series champion.

=== FIA Formula 2 Championship ===
It was announced in early February that Petecof would join Campos for the 2021 FIA F2 Championship. He lined up alongside Ralph Boschung. In June, he left the team, citing financial reasons.

=== Formula One ===
In December 2017, Ferrari added Petecof to their Driver Academy. In January 2021, Petecof announced he had left the academy.

=== Stock Car Brasil ===
In 2022, Petecof raced in the Stock Car Brasil with Full Time Sports. He would partner ex-Formula 1 race winner Rubens Barrichello.

== Karting record ==
=== Karting career summary ===
Season	Series	Team	Position
2012	Florida Winter Tour - Micro Max		11th
2013	15th Copa Brasil de Kart - Júnior Menor		1st
2013	SKUSA SuperNationals XVII - TaG Cadet	AM Racing Engines	7th
2014	Florida Winter Tour - Mini Max		1st
2014	Florida Winter Tour - Vortex TaG Cadet	AM Racing Engines	7th
2014	SKUSA SuperNationals XVIII - TaG Junior		37th
2014	Mini ROK International Final - Bridgestone Final		2nd
2015	Florida Winter Tour - Junior ROK		8th
2015	SKUSA SuperNationals XIX - TaG Junior		35th
2016	Andrea Margutti Trophy - OK Junior		8th
2016	CIK-FIA Karting European Championship - OK Junior		44th
2016	CIK-FIA Karting World Championship - OK Junior	CRG SpA	5th
2017	22° South Garda Winter Cup - OK	Tony Kart Racing Team	5th
2017	WSK Champions Cup - OK	Tony Kart Racing Team	24th
2017	WSK Super Master Series - OK	Tony Kart Racing Team	33rd
2017	CIK-FIA Karting European Championship - OK	Tony Kart Racing Team	21st
2017	CIK-FIA Karting World Championship - OK	Tony Kart Racing Team	6th

== Racing record ==
=== Racing career summary ===
Season	Series	Team	Races	Wins	Poles	F/Laps	Podiums	Points	Position
2018	Italian F4 Championship	Prema Theodore Racing	18	1	0	1	5	186	4th
2018	ADAC Formula 4 Championship	Prema Theodore Racing	21	0	0	0	1	92	10th
2019	Italian F4 Championship	Prema Powerteam	21	4	2	2	8	233	**2nd**
2019	ADAC Formula 4 Championship	Prema Powerteam	20	1	2	3	5	164	5th
2020	Formula Regional European Championship	Prema Powerteam	23	4	5	7	14	359	**1st**
2021	FIA Formula 2 Championship	Campos Racing	6	0	0	0	0	0	27th
2021	Formula Regional European Championship	KIC Motorsport	8	0	0	0	0	5	22nd
2022	Stock Car Pro Series	Full Time Sports	12	0	0	0	0	42	30th
2023	Stock Car Pro Series	Full Time Sports	23	0	0	0	3	205	13th
2024	Stock Car Pro Series	Full Time Sports	24	1	0	2	2	415	24th
2025	Stock Car Pro Series	CAR Racing KTF	22	2	0	1	2	483	19th
2025	NASCAR Brasil Series	R.Mattheis Motorsport	2	0	0	0	0	0	45th
2026	Stock Car Pro Series	TMG AMattheis	1	0	0	0	0	17	50th*

^{*} Season still in progress.

=== Complete Italian F4 Championship results ===
(key) (Races in bold indicate pole position) (Races in italics indicate fastest lap)

Year	Team	1	2	3	4	5	6	7	8	9	10	11	12	13	14	15	16	17	18	19	20	21	22	Pos	Points
2018	Prema Powerteam	ADR; 1; 5	ADR; 2; 2	ADR; 3; 7	LEC; 1; 13	LEC; 2; 4	LEC; 3; 6	MNZ; 1	MNZ; 2	MNZ; 3	MIS; 1; 4	MIS; 2; 24	MIS; 3 DSQ	IMO; 1; 6	IMO; 2; 6	IMO; 3; 6	VLL; 1; 2	VLL; 2; 5	VLL; 3; 5	MUG; 1; 1	MUG; 2; 3	MUG; 3; 2		4th	186
2019	Prema Powerteam	**VLL**; **1**; 1	VLL; 2; 5	VLL; 3; 1	**MIS**; **1**; 1	MIS; 2; 3	MIS; 3 C	HUN; 1; 2	HUN; 2; 4	HUN; 3; 1	RBR; 1; 11	RBR; 2; 9	RBR; 3; 4	IMO; 1 Ret	IMO; 2; 2	IMO; 3; 14	IMO; 4; 3	MUG; 1; 23	MUG; 2; 6	MUG; 3; 4	MNZ; 1; 10	MNZ; 2; 5	MNZ; 3 Ret	2nd	233

=== Complete ADAC Formula 4 Championship results ===
(key) (Races in bold indicate pole position) (Races in italics indicate fastest lap)

Year	Team	1	2	3	4	5	6	7	8	9	10	11	12	13	14	15	16	17	18	19	20	Pos	Points
2018	Prema Theodore Racing	OSC; 1; 8	OSC; 2; 6	OSC; 3; 15	HOC1; 1 Ret	HOC1; 2; 18	HOC1; 3; 9	LAU; 1 Ret	LAU; 2 Ret	LAU; 3; 9	RBR; 1; 7	RBR; 2 Ret	RBR; 3; 17	HOC2; 1; 6	HOC2; 2; 7	NÜR; 1; 5	NÜR; 2; 6	NÜR; 3; 2	HOC3; 1 Ret	HOC3; 2; 7	HOC3; 3; 4	10th	92
2019	Prema Powerteam	**OSC**; **1**; 1	OSC; 2; 16	OSC; 3 Ret	RBR; 1; 5	RBR; 2; 4	RBR; 3 Ret	HOC; 1; 3	HOC; 2; 4	ZAN; 1; 5	**ZAN**; **2**; 11	ZAN; 3 Ret	NÜR; 1; 3	NÜR; 2; 9	NÜR; 3 Ret	HOC; 1; 6	HOC; 2; 2	HOC; 3; 7	SAC; 1; 7	SAC; 2; 3	SAC; 3; 5	5th	164

=== Complete Formula Regional European Championship results ===
(key) (Races in bold indicate pole position) (Races in italics indicate fastest lap)

Year	Team	1	2	3	4	5	6	7	8	9	10	11	12	13	14	15	16	17	18	19	20	21	22	23	24	Pos	Points
2020	Prema Powerteam	MIS; 1; 4	MIS; 2; 2	MIS; 3; 1	LEC; 1; 2	**LEC**; **2**; 1	**LEC**; **3**; 2	**RBR**; **1**; 1	**RBR**; **2**; 2	**RBR**; **3**; 1	MUG; 1; 4	MUG; 2; 3	MUG; 3; 2	MNZ; 1; 2	MNZ; 2; 6	MNZ; 3; 2	CAT; 1; 5	CAT; 2; 6	CAT; 3; 3	IMO; 1; 8	IMO; 2; 3	IMO; 3; 4	VLL; 1; 4	VLL; 2 C	VLL; 3; 5	1st	359
2021	KIC Motorsport	IMO; 1	IMO; 2	CAT; 1	CAT; 2	MCO; 1	MCO; 2	LEC; 1	LEC; 2	ZAN; 1	ZAN; 2	SPA; 1	SPA; 2	RBR; 1 Ret	RBR; 2; 28	VAL; 1; 22	VAL; 2; 11	MUG; 1; 8	MUG; 2; 10	MNZ; 1; 21	MNZ; 2; 14					22nd	5

=== Complete FIA Formula 2 Championship results ===
(key) (Races in bold indicate pole position) (Races in italics indicate points for the fastest lap of top ten finishers)

Year	Entrant	1	2	3	4	5	6	7	8	9	10	11	12	13	14	15	16	17	18	19	20	21	22	23	24	DC	Points
2021	Campos Racing	BHR; SP1; 17	BHR; SP2; 13	BHR; FEA; Ret	MCO; SP1; Ret	MCO; SP2; Ret	MCO; FEA; 16	BAK; SP1	BAK; SP2	BAK; FEA	SIL; SP1	SIL; SP2	SIL; FEA	MNZ; SP1	MNZ; SP2	MNZ; FEA	SOC; SP1	SOC; SP2	SOC; FEA	JED; SP1	JED; SP2	JED; FEA	YMC; SP1	YMC; SP2	YMC; FEA	27th	0

=== Complete Stock Car Pro Series results ===
(key) (Races in bold indicate pole position) (Races in italics indicate fastest lap)

Year	Team	Car	1	2	3	4	5	6	7	8	9	10	11	12	13	14	15	16	17	18	19	20	21	22	23	24	25	Rank	Points
2022	Full Time Sports	Toyota Corolla	INT; 1; 22	GOI; 1; 30	GOI; 2 Ret	RIO; 1; 15	RIO; 2; 4	VCA; 1; 19	VCA; 2; 26	VEL; 1 Ret	VEL; 2; 13	VEL; 1; 16	VEL; 2; 17	INT; 1	INT; 2	VCA; 1	VCA; 2	SCZ; 1	SCZ; 2	GOI; 1	GOI; 2	GOI; 1	GOI; 2	INT; 1 Ret	INT; 2 DNS			30th	42
2023	Full Time Sports	Toyota Corolla	GOI; 1; 24	GOI; 2; 18	INT; 1 Ret	INT; 2 DNS	TAR; 1; 13	TAR; 2; 10	CAS; 1; 19	CAS; 2; 13	INT; 1; 9	INT; 2; 8	VCA; 1; 2	VCA; 2; 4	GOI; 1; 13	GOI; 2; 4	VEL; 1; 3	VEL; 2; 4	BUE; 1; 3	BUE; 2; 5	VCA; 1; 18	VCA; 2 Ret	CAS; 1; 20	CAS; 2 Ret	INT; 1; 22	INT; 2 Ret		13th	205
2024	Full Time Sports	Toyota Corolla	GOI; 1; 22	GOI; 2; 18	VCA; 1 Ret	VCA; 2 C	INT; 1; 19	INT; 2; 22	CAS; 1; 18	CAS; 2 DSQ	VCA; 1; 10	VCA; 2; 14	VCA; 3; 18	GOI; 1; 11	GOI; 2; 19	BLH; 1; 23†	BLH; 2 Ret	VEL; 1; 1	VEL; 2; 3	BUE; 1; 21†	BUE; 2 Ret	URU; 1; 25	URU; 2; 15	GOI; 1; 25	GOI; 2; 21	INT; 1; 14	INT; 2; 17	24th	415
2025	Sterling Racing	Mitsubishi Eclipse Cross	INT; 1; 24	CAS; 1; 1	CAS; 2; 6	VEL; 1; 9	VEL; 2; 13	VCA; 1; 14	VCA; 2 Ret	CRS; 1; 27	CRS; 2; 24	CAS; 1; 14	CAS; 2; 9	VCA; 1; 1	VCA; 2 Ret	VCA; 1; 22	VCA; 2; 18	MOU; 1; 15	MOU; 2; 10	CUI; 1; 28	CUI; 2 DNS	BRA; 1; 13	BRA; 2; 17	INT; 1; 15	INT; 2; 25			19th	483
2026	TMG AMattheis	Toyota Corolla Cross	CRS; 1	CRS; 2	CAS; 1	CAS; 2	INT; 1	INT; 2	GOI; 1	GOI; 2	CUI; 1	CUI; 2	VCA; 1	VCA; 2	SCZ; 1	SCZ; 2	CRS; 1	CRS; 2	BRA; 1; 18	CAS; 1	CAS; 2	VEL; 1	VEL; 2	INT; 1	INT; 2			50th*	17*

^{†} Driver did not finish, but was classified as he completed over 90% of the race distance. ^{*} Season still in progress.

Sporting positions
Preceded by Frederik Vesti	Formula Regional European Championship; Champion; 2020	Succeeded by Grégoire Saucy
