= 2018 Italian F4 Championship =

Formula racing championship

The 2018 Italian F4 Championship Powered by Abarth was the fifth season of the Italian F4 Championship. It began on 29 April in Adria and finished on 28 October in Mugello after seven triple header rounds.

The title was clinched by Enzo Fittipaldi, who won the season finale.

== Teams and drivers ==
Team	No.	Driver	Class	Rounds
(Netherlands) Van Amersfoort Racing	2	(Denmark) Frederik Vesti		2
(Netherlands) Van Amersfoort Racing	21	(Belgium) Charles Weerts		2
(Netherlands) Van Amersfoort Racing	23	(Germany) Lucas Alecco Roy		2, 7
(Netherlands) Van Amersfoort Racing	32	(Germany) Andreas Estner		7
(Netherlands) Van Amersfoort Racing	33	(Germany) Sebastian Estner		7
(Portugal) DR Formula	3	(Italy) Edoardo Morricone	R	1, 3–6
(Portugal) DR Formula	52	(Hungary) László Tóth	R	1–3
(Germany) BWT Mücke Motorsport	4	(Germany) Niklas Krütten	R	All
(Germany) BWT Mücke Motorsport	6	(Israel) Ido Cohen	R	All
(Germany) BWT Mücke Motorsport	25	(Finland) William Alatalo		All
(Germany) BWT Mücke Motorsport	34	(Belgium) Amaury Cordeel		3–4
(Italy) Prema Theodore Racing	5	(Brazil) Gianluca Petecof	R	1–2, 4–7
(Italy) Prema Theodore Racing	33	(Australia) Jack Doohan	R	2–3
(Italy) Prema Theodore Racing	64	(United Kingdom) Olli Caldwell		All
(Italy) Prema Theodore Racing	74	(Brazil) Enzo Fittipaldi		All
(Italy) Prema Theodore Racing	88	(United Arab Emirates) Amna Al Qubaisi	R	1, 3–7
(Slovenia) AS Motorsport	7	(Switzerland) Axel Gnos	R	2, 5
(Slovenia) AS Motorsport	69	(Finland) Jesse Salmenautio		7
(France) R-ace GP	8	(Switzerland) Grégoire Saucy		7
(France) R-ace GP	21	(Italy) Lorenzo Colombo		7
(Italy) Bhaitech	9	(Czech Republic) Petr Ptáček	R	All
(Italy) Bhaitech	10	(Venezuela) Alessandro Famularo	R	All
(Italy) Bhaitech	11	(Italy) Leonardo Lorandi		All
(Italy) Bhaitech	12	(Venezuela) Anthony Famularo	R	1–4
(Italy) Bhaitech	14	(Russia) Ilya Morozov	R	7
(Switzerland) KDC Racing	13	(United Kingdom) Aaron di Comberti		1–2
(Switzerland) KDC Racing	14	(Russia) Ilya Morozov	R	1–2
(Switzerland) KDC Racing	20	(United Kingdom) Toby Sowery		1–2
(Italy) Cram Motorsport	14	(Russia) Ilya Morozov	R	4–6
(Italy) Cram Motorsport	22	(Italy) Umberto Laganella	R	All
(Italy) Cram Motorsport	24	(Italy) Andrea Dell'Accio		All
(Italy) Cram Motorsport	29	(Venezuela) Emilio Cipriani	R	All
(Italy) Cram Motorsport	37	(Italy) Francesco Garisto	R	1, 3
(Italy) Cram Motorsport	94	(Sweden) Daniel Vebster	R	6–7
(Switzerland) Jenzer Motorsport	15	(Argentina) Giorgio Carrara		All
(Switzerland) Jenzer Motorsport	16	(Switzerland) Grégoire Saucy		1–6
(Switzerland) Jenzer Motorsport	17	(Malaysia) Nazim Azman		All
(Switzerland) Jenzer Motorsport	18	(Mexico) Javier González		1–5
(Switzerland) Jenzer Motorsport	19	(Denmark) Oliver Rasmussen	R	All
(Switzerland) Jenzer Motorsport	27	(Italy) Federico Malvestiti		All
(Italy) BVM Racing	31	(Italy) Marzio Moretti	R	1–5, 7
(Italy) BVM Racing	36	(Italy) Gastone Sampieri	R	1–2, 4–5
(Italy) DRZ Benelli	45	(Guatemala) Ian Rodríguez		1–6
(Italy) Technorace	49	(Italy) Alessio Deledda	R	All
(Italy) Alma Racing	77	(Italy) Diego Bertonelli		5
(Italy) Alma Racing	78	(Finland) Amaury Cordeel (Note: Cordeel is a Belgian driver who entered Monza round under Finnish racing license.)		7
(Portugal) DR Formula/Curv Motorsport	77	(Italy) Nicola Marinangeli	R	7
(Italy) Corbetta Competizioni	81	(Italy) Fabio Venditti	R	All

== Race calendar and results ==
The calendar was published on 22 October 2017. For the first time in the history of the championship, it included a circuit outside of Italy with a round being held at Circuit Paul Ricard in Southern France.

Round		Circuit	Date	Pole position	Fastest lap	Winning driver	Winning team	Rookie winner
1	R1	(Italy) Adria International Raceway	22 April	(Brazil) Enzo Fittipaldi	(Brazil) Enzo Fittipaldi	(Brazil) Enzo Fittipaldi	(Italy) Prema Theodore Racing	(Brazil) Gianluca Petecof
1	R2	(Italy) Adria International Raceway	22 April	(Italy) Leonardo Lorandi	(Italy) Leonardo Lorandi	(Italy) Leonardo Lorandi	(Italy) Bhaitech	(Brazil) Gianluca Petecof
1	R3	(Italy) Adria International Raceway	22 April	(Brazil) Enzo Fittipaldi	(Italy) Leonardo Lorandi	(Brazil) Enzo Fittipaldi	(Italy) Prema Theodore Racing	(Brazil) Gianluca Petecof
2	R1	(France) Circuit Paul Ricard, Le Castellet	12 May	(Denmark) Frederik Vesti	(Denmark) Frederik Vesti	(United Kingdom) Olli Caldwell	(Italy) Prema Theodore Racing	(Czech Republic) Petr Ptáček
2	R2	(France) Circuit Paul Ricard, Le Castellet	13 May	(United Kingdom) Olli Caldwell	(Brazil) Enzo Fittipaldi	(Denmark) Frederik Vesti	(Netherlands) Van Amersfoort Racing	(Brazil) Gianluca Petecof
2	R3	(France) Circuit Paul Ricard, Le Castellet	13 May	(Brazil) Enzo Fittipaldi	(Italy) Leonardo Lorandi	(Denmark) Frederik Vesti	(Netherlands) Van Amersfoort Racing	(Brazil) Gianluca Petecof
3	R1	(Italy) Autodromo Nazionale di Monza	2 June	(Switzerland) Grégoire Saucy	(Italy) Federico Malvestiti	(Italy) Leonardo Lorandi	(Italy) Bhaitech	(Australia) Jack Doohan
3	R2	(Italy) Autodromo Nazionale di Monza	3 June	(Italy) Leonardo Lorandi	(United Kingdom) Olli Caldwell	(Finland) William Alatalo	(Germany) BWT Mücke Motorsport	(Czech Republic) Petr Ptáček
3	R3	(Italy) Autodromo Nazionale di Monza	3 June	(Switzerland) Grégoire Saucy	(Czech Republic) Petr Ptáček	(Italy) Leonardo Lorandi	(Italy) Bhaitech	(Czech Republic) Petr Ptáček
4	R1	(Italy) Misano World Circuit Marco Simoncelli	16 June	(Brazil) Enzo Fittipaldi	(Brazil) Enzo Fittipaldi	(Brazil) Enzo Fittipaldi	(Italy) Prema Theodore Racing	(Czech Republic) Petr Ptáček
4	R2	(Italy) Misano World Circuit Marco Simoncelli	17 June	(Brazil) Enzo Fittipaldi	(Czech Republic) Petr Ptáček	(Brazil) Enzo Fittipaldi	(Italy) Prema Theodore Racing	(Czech Republic) Petr Ptáček
4	R3	(Italy) Misano World Circuit Marco Simoncelli	17 June	(Brazil) Enzo Fittipaldi	(Brazil) Gianluca Petecof	(Brazil) Enzo Fittipaldi	(Italy) Prema Theodore Racing	(Czech Republic) Petr Ptáček
5	R1	(Italy) Autodromo Enzo e Dino Ferrari	28 July	(Italy) Federico Malvestiti	(Czech Republic) Petr Ptáček	(Italy) Leonardo Lorandi	(Italy) Bhaitech	(Czech Republic) Petr Ptáček
5	R2	(Italy) Autodromo Enzo e Dino Ferrari	29 July	(Italy) Leonardo Lorandi	(Italy) Leonardo Lorandi	(Italy) Leonardo Lorandi	(Italy) Bhaitech	(Czech Republic) Petr Ptáček
5	R3	(Italy) Autodromo Enzo e Dino Ferrari	29 July	(Italy) Federico Malvestiti	(Switzerland) Grégoire Saucy	(Italy) Federico Malvestiti	(Switzerland) Jenzer Motorsport	(Czech Republic) Petr Ptáček
6	R1	(Italy) ACI Vallelunga Circuit	15 September	(United Kingdom) Olli Caldwell	(United Kingdom) Olli Caldwell	(United Kingdom) Olli Caldwell	(Italy) Prema Theodore Racing	(Brazil) Gianluca Petecof
6	R2	(Italy) ACI Vallelunga Circuit	16 September	(United Kingdom) Olli Caldwell	(Brazil) Enzo Fittipaldi	(United Kingdom) Olli Caldwell	(Italy) Prema Theodore Racing	(Czech Republic) Petr Ptáček
6	R3	(Italy) ACI Vallelunga Circuit	16 September	(United Kingdom) Olli Caldwell	(Czech Republic) Petr Ptáček	(United Kingdom) Olli Caldwell	(Italy) Prema Theodore Racing	(Czech Republic) Petr Ptáček
7	R1	(Italy) Mugello Circuit	27 October	(Brazil) Enzo Fittipaldi	(Italy) Federico Malvestiti	(Brazil) Gianluca Petecof	(Italy) Prema Theodore Racing	(Brazil) Gianluca Petecof
7	R2	(Italy) Mugello Circuit	28 October	(Brazil) Enzo Fittipaldi	(Italy) Leonardo Lorandi	(Brazil) Enzo Fittipaldi	(Italy) Prema Theodore Racing	(Brazil) Gianluca Petecof
7	R3	(Italy) Mugello Circuit	28 October	(Brazil) Enzo Fittipaldi	(Brazil) Enzo Fittipaldi	(Brazil) Enzo Fittipaldi	(Italy) Prema Theodore Racing	(Brazil) Gianluca Petecof

== Championship standings ==
Points were awarded to the top 10 classified finishers in each race. No points were awarded for pole position or fastest lap. Only the best sixteen results were counted towards the championship.

Position	**1st**	**2nd**	**3rd**	**4th**	**5th**	**6th**	**7th**	**8th**	**9th**	**10th**
Points	25	18	15	12	10	8	6	4	2	1

=== Drivers' standings ===
Pos	Driver	ADR (Italy)			LEC (France)			MNZ (Italy)			MIS (Italy)			IMO (Italy)			VLL (Italy)			MUG (Italy)			Pts
1	(Brazil) Enzo Fittipaldi	**1**	3	**1**	Ret	2	**5**	Ret	18	5	**1**	**1**	**1**	4	3	2	8	2	4	**Ret**	**1**	**1**	303
2	(Italy) Leonardo Lorandi	2	**1**	2	Ret	6	4	1	**4**	1	8	4	2	1	**1**	4	Ret	4	3	24	2	5	282
3	(United Kingdom) Olli Caldwell	7	4	8	1	**8**	2	2	2	3	6	10	9	9	2	9	**1**	**1**	**1**	2	4	3	262
4	(Brazil) Gianluca Petecof	5	2	7	13	4	6				4	24	DSQ	6	6	6	2	5	5	1	3	2	186
5	(Czech Republic) Petr Ptáček	10	8	17	4	13	7	Ret	6	4	2	2	3	5	5	3	Ret	3	2	6	Ret	4	182
6	(Italy) Federico Malvestiti	3	7	9	5	16	14	5	5	6	5	5	12	**2**	4	**1**	3	9	7	27	7	6	173
7	(Argentina) Giorgio Carrara	11	9	6	9	3	9	3	22	10	7	Ret	4	3	10	10	7	10	13	5	5	7	112
8	(Finland) William Alatalo	9	Ret	Ret	26	32	13	4	1	2	12	13	6	8	19	Ret	5	7	6	4	10	12	106
9	(Guatemala) Ian Rodríguez	6	6	Ret	6	7	DNS	15	3	Ret	3	3	Ret	10	9	12	WD	WD	WD				78
10	(Denmark) Frederik Vesti				**2**	1	1																68
11	(Switzerland) Grégoire Saucy	12	5	5	Ret	9	10	**9**	19	**Ret**	9	7	23	11	27	5	13	6	8	Ret	6	22	63
12	(United Kingdom) Toby Sowery	4	21	4	3	12	3																54
13	(Germany) Niklas Krütten	22	Ret	11	8	29	16	10	Ret	7	Ret	9	21	7	8	7	6	15	12	7	Ret	11	43
14	(Mexico) Javier González	8	10	3	7	11	26	Ret	21	8	11	11	22	14	7	8							40
15	(Italy) Umberto Laganella	13	Ret	10	24	22	11	7	8	11	21	25	5	17	12	22	4	11	21	11	Ret	DNS	33
16	(Germany) Andreas Estner																			3	8	9	21
17	(Malaysia) Nazim Azman	17	Ret	12	15	17	15	8	10	9	24	12	7	15	15	14	9	12	9	18	Ret	19	17
18	(Belgium) Charles Weerts				10	5	8																15
19	(Russia) Ilya Morozov	21	20	Ret	11	21	22				10	6	8	16	13	Ret	10	13	10	16	17	27	15
20	(Australia) Jack Doohan				Ret	10	12	6	11	19													9
21	(Venezuela) Alessandro Famularo	Ret	17	13	20	25	25	22	14	13	17	19	14	13	26	Ret	11	8	18	8	13	15	8
22	(Italy) Marzio Moretti	14	15	14	12	18	20	20	9	12	16	16	13	23	17	11				9	11	8	8
23	(Italy) Edoardo Morricone	20	13	23				12	7	Ret	14	15	Ret	Ret	14	15	Ret	14	11				6
24	(Denmark) Oliver Rasmussen	18	Ret	18	14	19	17	11	Ret	Ret	Ret	8	Ret	18	Ret	20	14	19	14	13	Ret	25	4
25	(Italy) Lorenzo Colombo																			14	9	10	3
26	(Italy) Gastone Sampieri	Ret	Ret	19	19	20	23				25	14	10	Ret	18	13							1
27	(Germany) Sebastian Estner																			10	15	26	1
28	(Italy) Diego Bertonelli													12	11	17							0
29	(Venezuela) Anthony Famularo	Ret	14	15	17	23	32	18	Ret	13	13	22	11										0
30	(Israel) Ido Cohen	16	11	Ret	16	15	18	13	Ret	Ret	Ret	18	15	26	16	Ret	15	17	Ret	15	14	16	0
31	(Belgium) Amaury Cordeel							14	13	14	15	Ret	16							23	12	13	0
32	(Sweden) Daniel Vebster																12	20	20	20	16	14	0
33	(Germany) Lucas Alecco Roy				18	14	19													12	Ret	24	0
34	(United Arab Emirates) Amna Al Qubaisi	Ret	12	16				24	16	17	20	23	Ret	20	20	23	Ret	16	15	19	21	21	0
35	(Italy) Andrea Dell'Accio	19	16	Ret	21	28	27	16	12	16	18	17	18	25	22	18	16	18	17	26	18	23	0
36	(Venezuela) Emilio Cipriani	25	22	21	23	Ret	24	17	15	15	19	20	17	19	21	Ret	17	22	16	25	Ret	17	0
37	(United Kingdom) Aaron di Comberti	15	19	Ret	Ret	24	21																0
38	(Switzerland) Axel Gnos				25	27	30							22	24	16							0
39	(Italy) Alessio Deledda	26	Ret	22	27	30	29	19	17	18	22	Ret	19	21	23	19	18	21	19	21	Ret	28	0
40	(Finland) Jesse Salmenautio																			17	19	18	0
41	(Hungary) László Tóth	23	18	20	22	26	28	Ret	20	Ret													0
42	(Italy) Fabio Venditti	27	23	24	28	31	31	21	Ret	20	23	21	20	24	25	21	19	Ret	Ret	28	20	20	0
43	(Italy) Nicola Marinangeli																			22	Ret	29	0
44	(Italy) Francesco Garisto	24	Ret	Ret				23	23	Ret													0
Pos	Driver	ADR (Italy)			LEC (France)			MNZ (Italy)			MIS (Italy)			IMO (Italy)			VLL (Italy)			MUG (Italy)			Pts

Colour	Result
Gold	Winner
Silver	Second place
Bronze	Third place
Green	Points classification
Blue	Non-points classification
Blue	Non-classified finish (NC)
Purple	Retired, not classified (Ret)
Red	Did not qualify (DNQ)
Red	Did not pre-qualify (DNPQ)
Black	Disqualified (DSQ)
White	Did not start (DNS)
White	Withdrew (WD)
White	Race cancelled (C)
Blank	Did not practice (DNP)
Blank	Did not arrive (DNA)
Blank	Excluded (EX)

**Bold** – Pole
Italics – Fastest Lap

=== Rookies' standings ===
Pos	Driver	ADR (Italy)			LEC (France)			MNZ (Italy)			MIS (Italy)			IMO (Italy)			VLL (Italy)			MUG (Italy)			Pts
1	(Czech Republic) Petr Ptáček	2	2	7	1	3	2	Ret	1	1	1	1	1	1	1	1	Ret	1	1	2	Ret	2	365
2	(Brazil) Gianluca Petecof	1	1	1	5	1	1				2	13	DSQ	2	2	2	1	2	2	1	1	1	343
3	(Germany) Niklas Krütten	9	Ret	3	2	14	5	3	Ret	2	Ret	4	12	3	3	3	3	7	5	3	Ret	4	193
4	(Italy) Umberto Laganella	3	Ret	2	13	9	3	2	3	3	9	11	2	6	4	11	2	4	11	7	Ret	DNS	174
5	(Italy) Marzio Moretti	4	6	5	4	5	8	10	4	4	6	7	6	11	8	4				5	2	3	161
6	(Russia) Ilya Morozov	8	9	Ret	3	8	9				3	2	3	5	5	Ret	4	5	3	10	7	12	139
7	(Venezuela) Alessandro Famularo	Ret	7	4	9	11	12	12	6	5	7	9	7	4	14	Ret	5	3	8	4	3	6	128
8	(Italy) Edoardo Morricone	7	4	13				5	2	Ret	5	6	Ret	Ret	6	6	Ret	6	4				100
9	(Israel) Ido Cohen	5	3	Ret	7	4	7	6	Ret	Ret	Ret	8	8	13	7	Ret	8	8	Ret	9	4	7	99
10	(Denmark) Oliver Rasmussen	6	Ret	8	6	6	6	4	Ret	Ret	Ret	3	Ret	7	Ret	9	7	9	6	8	Ret	10	92
11	(Australia) Jack Doohan				Ret	2	4	1	5	8													69
12	(Italy) Gastone Sampieri	Ret	Ret	9	8	7	10				12	5	4	Ret	9	5							47
13	(Venezuela) Anthony Famularo	Ret	5	6	11	10	17	8	Ret	10	4	12	5										46
14	(Venezuela) Emilio Cipriani	12	10	11	12	Ret	11	7	7	6	8	10	9	8	10	Ret	9	12	7	14	Ret	8	41
15	(Sweden) Daniel Vebster																6	10	10	11	6	5	28
16	(Italy) Alessio Deledda	14	Ret	12	15	15	14	9	8	7	10	Ret	10	9	11	8	10	11	9	12	Ret	13	23
17	(Germany) Sebastian Estner																			6	5	11	18
18	(Italy) Fabio Venditti	15	11	14	16	16	16	11	Ret	9	11	11	11	12	13	10	11	Ret	Ret	15	8	9	9
19	(Hungary) László Tóth	10	8	10	10	12	13	Ret	9	Ret													9
20	(Switzerland) Axel Gnos				14	13	15							10	12	7							7
21	(Italy) Francesco Garisto	11	Ret	Ret				13	10	Ret													1
22	(Italy) Nicola Marinangeli																			13	Ret	14	0
Pos	Driver	ADR (Italy)			LEC (France)			MNZ (Italy)			MIS (Italy)			IMO (Italy)			VLL (Italy)			MUG (Italy)			Pts

Colour	Result
Gold	Winner
Silver	Second place
Bronze	Third place
Green	Points classification
Blue	Non-points classification
Blue	Non-classified finish (NC)
Purple	Retired, not classified (Ret)
Red	Did not qualify (DNQ)
Red	Did not pre-qualify (DNPQ)
Black	Disqualified (DSQ)
White	Did not start (DNS)
White	Withdrew (WD)
White	Race cancelled (C)
Blank	Did not practice (DNP)
Blank	Did not arrive (DNA)
Blank	Excluded (EX)

=== Teams' championship ===
Pos	Team	Points
1	(Italy) Prema Theodore Racing	667
2	(Italy) Bhaitech	480
3	(Switzerland) Jenzer Motorsport	363
4	(Germany) BWT Mücke Motorsport	148
5	(Netherlands) Van Amersfoort Racing	103
6	(Italy) DRZ Benelli	78
7	(Switzerland) KDC Racing	54
8	(Italy) Cram Motorsport	48
9	(France) R-ace GP	11
10	(Italy) BVM	9
11	(Portugal) DR Formula	6
–	(Italy) Technorace	0
–	(Italy) Corbetta Competizioni	0
–	(Slovenia) AS Motorsport	0
–	(Italy) Alma Racing	0
–	(Portugal) DR Formula/Curv Motorsport	0
