= 2020 Formula Regional European Championship =

Motor racing championship in Europe

The 2020 Formula Regional European Championship was a multi-event, Formula 3 open-wheel single seater motor racing championship held across Europe. The championship featured a mix of professional and amateur drivers, competing in Formula 3 cars that conformed to the FIA Formula 3 regulations for the championship. This was the second season of the championship.

The season started on 31 July at Misano Circuit and concluded on 6 December at Autodromo Vallelunga, after eight meetings. Gianluca Petecof won the drivers' championship at the last race, while Prema Powerteam defended the teams' title. Although Petecof came out victorious in the championship, he did not amass the highest number of race wins, with four compared to his teammates' Arthur Leclerc and Oliver Rasmussen six victories. Patrik Pasma also won four races, and Pierre-Louis Chovet, Dennis Hauger and Ian Rodríguez all won one race each.

== Teams and drivers ==
All teams and drivers competed with the Tatuus-Alfa Romeo F.3 T-318.

Team	No.	Drivers	Status	Rounds
(Finland) KIC Motorsport	2	(Germany) Nico Göhler		3, 5
(Finland) KIC Motorsport	4	(Estonia) Jüri Vips		1–2, 4
(Finland) KIC Motorsport	5	(Finland) Patrik Pasma		All
(Finland) KIC Motorsport	7	(Italy) Nicola Marinangeli		7–8
(Finland) KIC Motorsport	40	(Finland) Konsta Lappalainen		All
(Netherlands) Van Amersfoort Racing	3	(France) Pierre-Louis Chovet	R	All
(Netherlands) Van Amersfoort Racing	11	(Venezuela) Alessandro Famularo	R	3–5
(Netherlands) Van Amersfoort Racing	23	(Argentina) Facu Regalia	G	2
(Netherlands) Van Amersfoort Racing	62	(Norway) Dennis Hauger		6–8
(Italy) Prema Powerteam	6	(Denmark) Oliver Rasmussen	R	All
(Italy) Prema Powerteam	10	(Brazil) Gianluca Petecof	R	All
(Italy) Prema Powerteam	14	(Monaco) Arthur Leclerc	R	All
(Italy) Prema Powerteam	55	(United Kingdom) Jamie Chadwick		All
(Italy) Monolite Racing	15	(Italy) Matteo Nannini		6
(Italy) Monolite Racing	99	(Italy) Andrea Cola	R	1–5, 8
(France) Gillian Track Events GTE	33	(France) Gillian Henrion	R	All
(Portugal) DR Formula RP Motorsport	41	(Italy) Emidio Pesce	R	All
(Portugal) DR Formula RP Motorsport	45	(Guatemala) Ian Rodríguez		7

Icon	Status
R	Rookie
G	Guest

- Roman Staněk was scheduled to compete for Prema Powerteam, but withdrew prior to the start of the season. His seat was taken by Jamie Chadwick.
- Brad Benavides was scheduled to compete for DR Formula RP Motorsport, but did not appear in any rounds.
- David Vidales was scheduled to compete for US Racing, but neither the team nor the driver appeared in any rounds.

== Race calendar ==
The initial calendar was announced on 16 September 2019. After multiple postponements due to the COVID-19 pandemic, a revised calendar was announced on 19 May 2020. On 3 June 2020 it was announced that the season opener at Hungaroring was pushed back 2 weeks. The current version of the amended calendar was published on 11 June 2020 and saw the round at the Hungaroring replaced by a visit to Misano Circuit.

Round		Circuit	Date	Pole position	Fastest lap	Winning driver	Winning team	Rookie winner
1	R1	(Italy) Misano World Circuit Marco Simoncelli	1 August	(Monaco) Arthur Leclerc	(Estonia) Jüri Vips	(Denmark) Oliver Rasmussen	(Italy) Prema Powerteam	(Denmark) Oliver Rasmussen
1	R2	(Italy) Misano World Circuit Marco Simoncelli	1 August	(Monaco) Arthur Leclerc	(Brazil) Gianluca Petecof	(Monaco) Arthur Leclerc	(Italy) Prema Powerteam	(Monaco) Arthur Leclerc
1	R3	(Italy) Misano World Circuit Marco Simoncelli	2 August	(Monaco) Arthur Leclerc	(Monaco) Arthur Leclerc	(Brazil) Gianluca Petecof	(Italy) Prema Powerteam	(Brazil) Gianluca Petecof
2	R1	(France) Circuit Paul Ricard	22 August	(Monaco) Arthur Leclerc	(Monaco) Arthur Leclerc	(Monaco) Arthur Leclerc	(Italy) Prema Powerteam	(Monaco) Arthur Leclerc
2	R2	(France) Circuit Paul Ricard	22 August	(Brazil) Gianluca Petecof	(Estonia) Jüri Vips	(Brazil) Gianluca Petecof	(Italy) Prema Powerteam	(Brazil) Gianluca Petecof
2	R3	(France) Circuit Paul Ricard	23 August	(Brazil) Gianluca Petecof	(Brazil) Gianluca Petecof	(Monaco) Arthur Leclerc	(Italy) Prema Powerteam	(Monaco) Arthur Leclerc
3	R1	(Austria) Red Bull Ring	12 September	(Brazil) Gianluca Petecof	(Brazil) Gianluca Petecof	(Brazil) Gianluca Petecof	(Italy) Prema Powerteam	(Brazil) Gianluca Petecof
3	R2	(Austria) Red Bull Ring	13 September	(Brazil) Gianluca Petecof	(Brazil) Gianluca Petecof	(Denmark) Oliver Rasmussen	(Italy) Prema Powerteam	(Denmark) Oliver Rasmussen
3	R3	(Austria) Red Bull Ring	13 September	(Brazil) Gianluca Petecof	(Brazil) Gianluca Petecof	(Brazil) Gianluca Petecof	(Italy) Prema Powerteam	(Brazil) Gianluca Petecof
4	R1	(Italy) Mugello Circuit	3 October	(Denmark) Oliver Rasmussen	(Estonia) Jüri Vips	(Monaco) Arthur Leclerc	(Italy) Prema Powerteam	(Monaco) Arthur Leclerc
4	R2	(Italy) Mugello Circuit	4 October	(Monaco) Arthur Leclerc	(France) Pierre-Louis Chovet	(Monaco) Arthur Leclerc	(Italy) Prema Powerteam	(Monaco) Arthur Leclerc
4	R3	(Italy) Mugello Circuit	4 October	(Monaco) Arthur Leclerc	(Brazil) Gianluca Petecof	(Monaco) Arthur Leclerc	(Italy) Prema Powerteam	(Monaco) Arthur Leclerc
5	R1	(Italy) Autodromo Nazionale Monza	17 October	(Finland) Patrik Pasma	(Denmark) Oliver Rasmussen	(Finland) Patrik Pasma	(Finland) KIC Motorsport	(Brazil) Gianluca Petecof
5	R2	(Italy) Autodromo Nazionale Monza	18 October	(Finland) Patrik Pasma	(Denmark) Oliver Rasmussen	(Denmark) Oliver Rasmussen	(Italy) Prema Powerteam	(Denmark) Oliver Rasmussen
5	R3	(Italy) Autodromo Nazionale Monza	18 October	(Monaco) Arthur Leclerc	(Brazil) Gianluca Petecof	(Finland) Patrik Pasma	(Finland) KIC Motorsport	(Brazil) Gianluca Petecof
6	R1	(Spain) Circuit de Barcelona-Catalunya	31 October	(France) Pierre-Louis Chovet	(France) Pierre-Louis Chovet	(Denmark) Oliver Rasmussen	(Italy) Prema Powerteam	(Denmark) Oliver Rasmussen
6	R2	(Spain) Circuit de Barcelona-Catalunya	31 October	(Norway) Dennis Hauger	(Denmark) Oliver Rasmussen	(Denmark) Oliver Rasmussen	(Italy) Prema Powerteam	(Denmark) Oliver Rasmussen
6	R3	(Spain) Circuit de Barcelona-Catalunya	1 November	(Norway) Dennis Hauger	(France) Pierre-Louis Chovet	(France) Pierre-Louis Chovet	(Netherlands) Van Amersfoort Racing	(France) Pierre-Louis Chovet
7	R1	(Italy) Autodromo Enzo e Dino Ferrari	21 November	(Denmark) Oliver Rasmussen	(Norway) Dennis Hauger	(Guatemala) Ian Rodríguez	(Portugal) DR Formula RP Motorsport	(Monaco) Arthur Leclerc
7	R2	(Italy) Autodromo Enzo e Dino Ferrari	22 November	(Monaco) Arthur Leclerc	(Finland) Patrik Pasma	(Finland) Patrik Pasma	(Finland) KIC Motorsport	(Brazil) Gianluca Petecof
7	R3	(Italy) Autodromo Enzo e Dino Ferrari	22 November	(Finland) Patrik Pasma	(Finland) Patrik Pasma	(Finland) Patrik Pasma	(Finland) KIC Motorsport	(Monaco) Arthur Leclerc
8	R1	(Italy) Autodromo Vallelunga	5 December	(Denmark) Oliver Rasmussen	(Finland) Patrik Pasma	(Norway) Dennis Hauger	(Netherlands) Van Amersfoort Racing	(Denmark) Oliver Rasmussen
8	R2	(Italy) Autodromo Vallelunga	6 December	(Denmark) Oliver Rasmussen	Race cancelled due to weather conditions			
8	R3	(Italy) Autodromo Vallelunga	6 December	(Denmark) Oliver Rasmussen	(Finland) Konsta Lappalainen	(Denmark) Oliver Rasmussen	(Italy) Prema Powerteam	(Denmark) Oliver Rasmussen

== Championship standings ==
Points were awarded to the top 10 classified finishers in each race. No points were awarded for pole position or fastest lap.

Position	**1st**	**2nd**	**3rd**	**4th**	**5th**	**6th**	**7th**	**8th**	**9th**	**10th**
Points	25	18	15	12	10	8	6	4	2	1

=== Drivers' standings ===
Pos	Driver	MIS (Italy)			LEC (France)			RBR (Austria)			MUG (Italy)			MNZ (Italy)			CAT (Spain)			IMO (Italy)			VLL (Italy)			Pts
Pos	Driver	R1	R2	R3	R1	R2	R3	R1	R2	R3	R1	R2	R3	R1	R2	R3	R1	R2	R3	R1	R2	R3	R1	R2	R3	Pts
1	(Brazil) Gianluca Petecof	4	2	1	2	**1**	**2**	**1**	**2**	**1**	4	3	2	2	6	2	5	6	3	8	3	4	4	C	5	359
2	(Monaco) Arthur Leclerc	**Ret**	**1**	**2**	**1**	2	1	2	3	2	1	**1**	**1**	3	9†	**6**	2	5	4	3	**Ret**	2	6	C	Ret	343
3	(Denmark) Oliver Rasmussen	1	3	3	6	5	4	3	1	3	**3**	6	3	4	1	4	1	1	5	**DNS**	6	6	**3**	**C**	**1**	343
4	(Finland) Patrik Pasma	2	4	5	5	6	5	4	5	6	8	9	4	**1**	**4**	1	4	4	8	6	1	**1**	2	C	6	290
5	(France) Pierre-Louis Chovet	5	5	7	3	4	7	5	4	7	5	2	7	11	3	5	**7**	3	1	4	5	3	Ret	C	3	244
6	(Finland) Konsta Lappalainen	9†	7	Ret	8	Ret	6	Ret	7	11	7	DNS	5	7	2	3	6	10	7	5	7	8	5	C	4	140
7	(Norway) Dennis Hauger																3	**2**	**2**	2	4	5	1	C	2	134
8	(Estonia) Jüri Vips	Ret	6	4	4	3	3				2	10	Ret													81
9	(United Kingdom) Jamie Chadwick	3	8	6	10	10†	9	Ret	10	5	9	7	8	10	Ret	8	10	9	10	Ret	9	10	8	C	7	80
10	(France) Gillian Henrion	8†	10	8	9	8	10	Ret	Ret	8	DNS	4	10	6	Ret	Ret	8	7	9	7	8	Ret	7	C	8	78
11	(Venezuela) Alessandro Famularo							7	6	4	6	5	6	5	5	10										73
12	(Italy) Emidio Pesce	7	11	Ret	11	11†	DNS	8	8	9	Ret	8	9	8	7	7	11	11	11	10	11	7	9	C	10	50
13	(Guatemala) Ian Rodríguez																			1	2	9				45
14	(Italy) Andrea Cola	6	9	9	12	9	11	9	11	10	Ret	Ret	11†	12	8	9							WD	C	WD	26
15	(Italy) Matteo Nannini																9	8	6							14
16	(Germany) Nico Göhler							6	9	Ret				9	Ret	DNS										12
17	(Italy) Nicola Marinangeli																			9	10	11	10	C	9	6
Guest drivers ineligible to score points
–	(Argentina) Facu Regalia				7	7	8																			–
Pos	Driver	R1	R2	R3	R1	R2	R3	R1	R2	R3	R1	R2	R3	R1	R2	R3	R1	R2	R3	R1	R2	R3	R1	R2	R3	Pts
Pos	Driver	MIS (Italy)			LEC (France)			RBR (Austria)			MUG (Italy)			MNZ (Italy)			CAT (Spain)			IMO (Italy)			VLL (Italy)			Pts

Colour	Result
Gold	Winner
Silver	Second place
Bronze	Third place
Green	Points classification
Blue	Non-points classification
Blue	Non-classified finish (NC)
Purple	Retired, not classified (Ret)
Red	Did not qualify (DNQ)
Red	Did not pre-qualify (DNPQ)
Black	Disqualified (DSQ)
White	Did not start (DNS)
White	Withdrew (WD)
White	Race cancelled (C)
Blank	Did not practice (DNP)
Blank	Did not arrive (DNA)
Blank	Excluded (EX)

**Bold** – Pole
Italics – Fastest Lap
† — Did not finish, but classified

=== Rookies' standings ===
Pos	Driver	MIS (Italy)			LEC (France)			RBR (Austria)			MUG (Italy)			MNZ (Italy)			CAT (Spain)			IMO (Italy)			VLL (Italy)			Pts
Pos	Driver	R1	R2	R3	R1	R2	R3	R1	R2	R3	R1	R2	R3	R1	R2	R3	R1	R2	R3	R1	R2	R3	R1	R2	R3	Pts
1	(Brazil) Gianluca Petecof	4	2	1	2	1	2	1	2	1	4	3	2	2	6	2	5	6	3	8	3	4	4	C	5	430
2	(Denmark) Oliver Rasmussen	1	3	3	6	5	4	3	1	3	3	6	3	4	1	4	1	1	5	DNS	6	6	3	C	1	387
3	(Monaco) Arthur Leclerc	Ret	1	2	1	2	1	2	3	2	1	1	1	3	9†	6	2	5	4	3	Ret	2	6	C	Ret	386
4	(France) Pierre-Louis Chovet	5	5	7	3	4	7	5	4	7	5	2	7	11	3	5	7	3	1	4	5	3	Ret	C	3	321
5	(France) Gillian Henrion	8†	10	8	9	8	10	Ret	Ret	8	DNS	4	10	6	Ret	Ret	8	7	9	7	8	Ret	7	C	8	173
6	(Italy) Emidio Pesce	7	11	Ret	11	11†	DNS	8	8	9	Ret	8	9	8	7	7	11	11	11	10	11	7	9	C	10	168
7	(Venezuela) Alessandro Famularo							7	6	4	6	5	6	5	5	10										97
8	(Italy) Andrea Cola	6	9	9	12	9	11	9	11	10	Ret	Ret	11†	12	8	9							WD	C	WD	92
Pos	Driver	R1	R2	R3	R1	R2	R3	R1	R2	R3	R1	R2	R3	R1	R2	R3	R1	R2	R3	R1	R2	R3	R1	R2	R3	Pts
Pos	Driver	MIS (Italy)			LEC (France)			RBR (Austria)			MUG (Italy)			MNZ (Italy)			CAT (Spain)			IMO (Italy)			VLL (Italy)			Pts

=== Teams' standings ===
Only the two highest finishing cars of one team were eligible for points.

Pos	Team	MIS (Italy)			LEC (France)			RBR (Austria)			MUG (Italy)			MNZ (Italy)			CAT (Spain)			IMO (Italy)			VLL (Italy)			Pts
Pos	Team	R1	R2	R3	R1	R2	R3	R1	R2	R3	R1	R2	R3	R1	R2	R3	R1	R2	R3	R1	R2	R3	R1	R2	R3	Pts
1	(Italy) Prema Powerteam	1	1	1	1	1	1	1	1	1	1	1	1	2	1	2	1	1	3	3	3	2	3	C	1	842
1	(Italy) Prema Powerteam	3	2	2	2	2	2	2	2	2	3	3	2	3	6	4	2	5	4	8	6	4	4	C	5	842
2	(Finland) KIC Motorsport	2	4	4	4	3	3	4	5	6	2	9	4	1	2	1	4	4	7	5	1	1	2	C	4	495
2	(Finland) KIC Motorsport	9†	6	5	5	6	5	6	7	11	7	10	5	7	4	3	6	10	8	6	7	8	5	C	6	495
3	(Netherlands) Van Amersfoort Racing	5	5	7	3	4	7	5	4	4	5	2	6	5	3	5	3	2	1	2	4	3	1	C	2	451
3	(Netherlands) Van Amersfoort Racing							7	6	7	6	5	7	11	5	10	7	3	2	4	5	5	Ret	C	3	451
4	(Portugal) DR Formula RP Motorsport	7	11	Ret	11	11†	DNS	8	8	9	Ret	8	9	8	7	7	11	11	11	1	2	7	9	C	10	95
4	(Portugal) DR Formula RP Motorsport																			10	11	9				95
5	(France) Gillian Track Events GTE	8†	10	8	9	8	10	Ret	Ret	8	DNS	4	10	6	Ret	Ret	8	7	9	7	8	Ret	7	C	8	78
6	(Italy) Monolite Racing	6	9	9	12	9	11	9	11	10	Ret	Ret	11†	12	8	9	9	8	6				WD	C	WD	40
Pos	Driver	R1	R2	R3	R1	R2	R3	R1	R2	R3	R1	R2	R3	R1	R2	R3	R1	R2	R3	R1	R2	R3	R1	R2	R3	Pts
Pos	Driver	MIS (Italy)			LEC (France)			RBR (Austria)			MUG (Italy)			MNZ (Italy)			CAT (Spain)			IMO (Italy)			VLL (Italy)			Pts
