= Formula Regional European Championship =

Single-seater racing championship

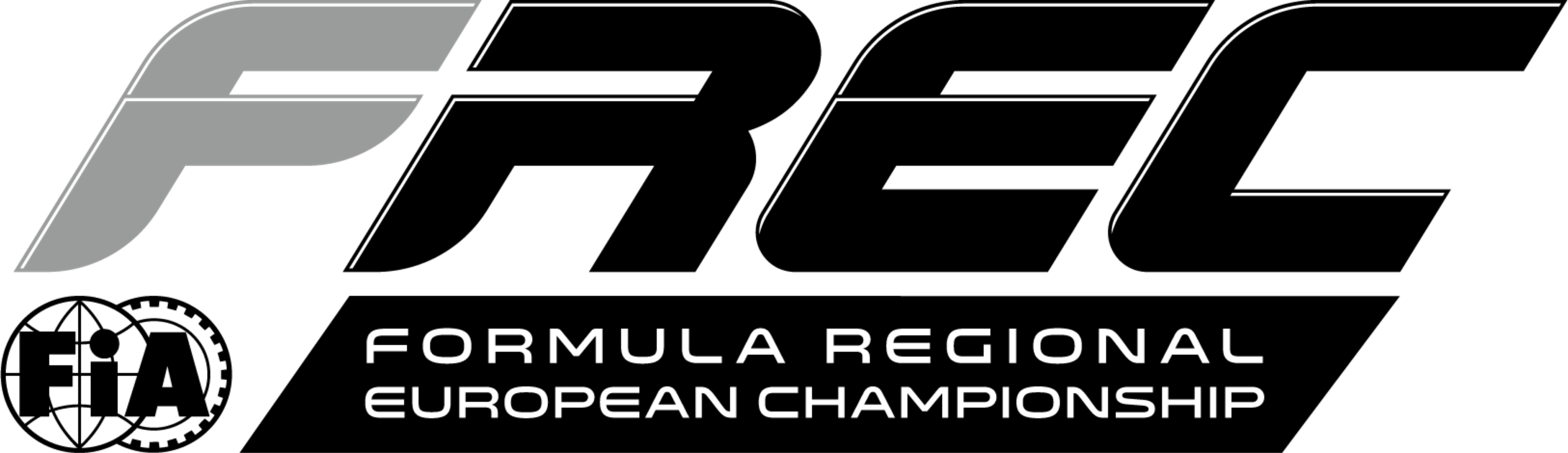
- Category: Formula Regional
- Region: Europe
- Inaugural season: 2019
- Constructors: Tatuus
- Engine suppliers: Toyota
- Tyre suppliers: Pirelli
- Drivers' champion: (Italy) Emanuele Olivieri
- Teams' champion: (France) R-ace GP
- Official website: fiafrec.com

The FIA Formula Regional European Championship (formerly known as the Formula Regional European Championship by Alpine (FRECA), or simply FR Europe) is a regional European Formula 3 racing series regulated by the Fédération Internationale de l'Automobile (FIA). The championship began in 2019 and is organized by the Italian autosport regulator Automobile Club d'Italia (ACI) and karting promoter WSK. Their bid was chosen over Renault Sport's bid with the same chassis, who attracted fewer votes from Single-Seater Commission members. Following the 2020 season, the Formula Renault Eurocup merged with the Formula Regional European Championship to become the Formula Regional European Championship by Alpine. The series received full FIA status in 2026 and was again rebranded to FREC as Alpine left as engine supplier and sponsor to focus on their Formula One team.

The championship's first season featured eight rounds on the circuits across Europe with half of them in Italy. Like other Formula Regional championships, it serves as a development series as part of the FIA Global Pathway, and is primarily contested by young drivers seeking a professional racing career. The driver champions receive FIA Super License points. The series is intended to be a stepping stone between Formula 4 and the international FIA Formula 3 Championship. Franco Colapinto was the first driver from the series to make it to Formula One, driving for Williams Racing for the latter part of the 2024 season. 2025 featured the next three graduates in the name of Andrea Kimi Antonelli, Gabriel Bortoleto and Isack Hadjar, driving for the Mercedes-AMG Petronas F1 Team, Stake F1 Team Kick Sauber, and Visa Cash App Racing Bulls Formula One Team respectively starting from the 2025 season. Many FREC drivers have subsequently competed in the feeder series directly below F1, the FIA Formula 2 Championship.

== Car ==
The championship features Tatuus-designed and built cars. The cars are constructed out of carbon fibre and feature a monocoque chassis which feature a number of enhanced safety features including the new Halo device and improved side impact protection, and have a six-speed paddle-shift sequential gearbox. In the 2019 and 2020 seasons, the car was powered by an Alfa Romeo 270PS (200 kW) turbo engine tuned by Autotecnica. After the merge with Formula Renault Eurocup for the 2021 season the championship uses Renault engines. From 2022, the cars feature a push-to-pass system. When pressed, the engine temporarily produces extra power for a period of 15 seconds. Push-to-pass can be used five times during a race. Unlike DRS in Formula One, the push-to-pass system can be used at any time during a race.

== Costs ==
One 2024 estimate puts the cost of competing in a front-running car at around €1,000,000 per season. The minimum for "back-marker" cars was around €350,000. These costs are typically met by either the competitors' families or personal sponsors.

== Media ==
Races are livestreamed and are available on YouTube at no cost.

== Champions ==
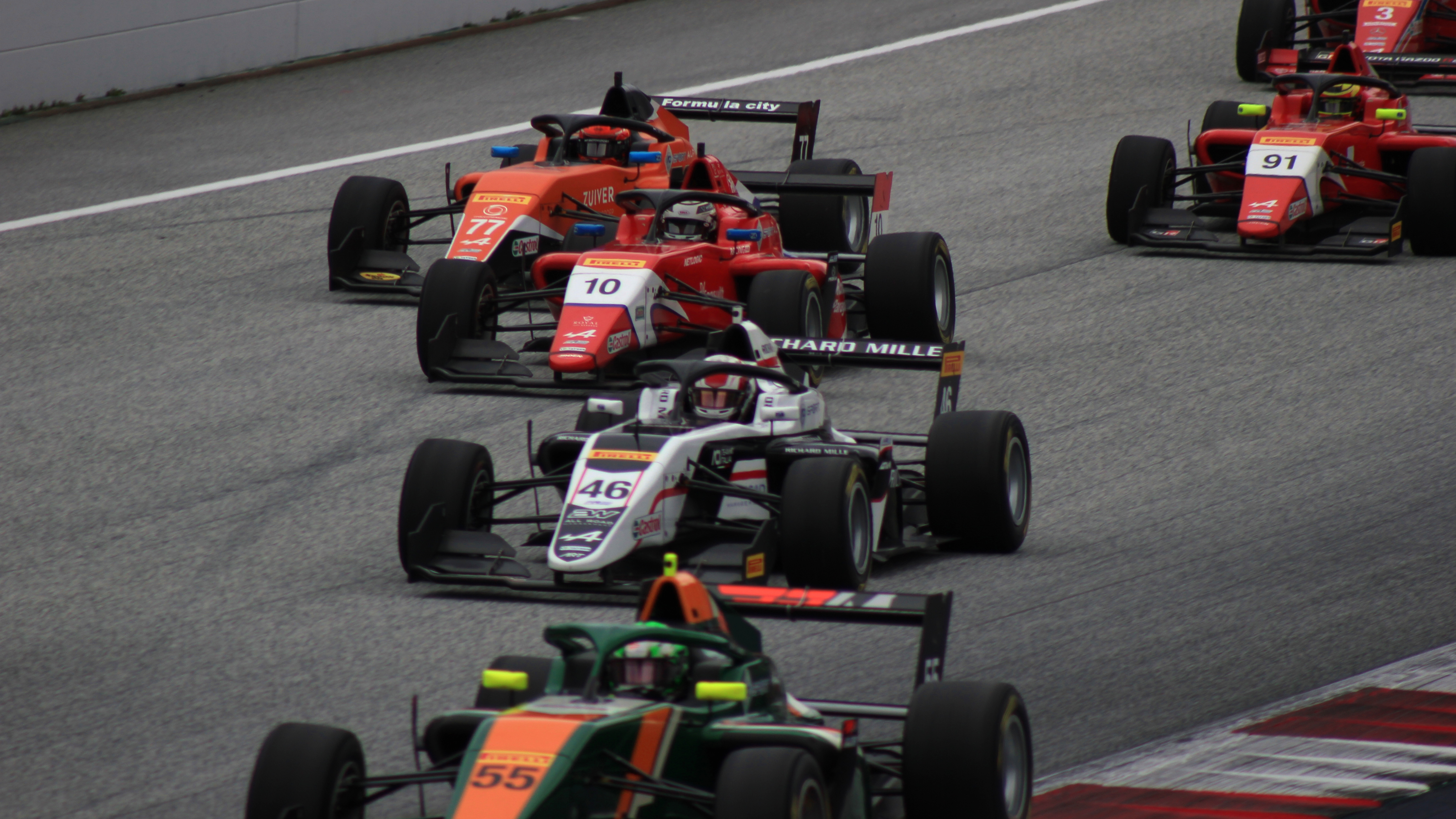
Racing scene from the 2022 season

=== Drivers' ===
Season	Driver	Team	Poles	Wins	Podiums	Fastest laps	Points	% points achievable	Clinched	Margin
2019	(Denmark) Frederik Vesti	(Italy) Prema Powerteam	10	13	20	9	467	77.833	Race 21 of 24	131
2020	(Brazil) Gianluca Petecof	(Italy) Prema Powerteam	5	4	14	7	359	62.435	Race 24 of 24	16
2021	(Switzerland) Grégoire Saucy	(France) ART Grand Prix	7	8	10	2	277	55.400	Race 17 of 20	68
2022	(Sweden) Dino Beganovic	(Italy) Prema Racing	4	4	14	2	300	60.000	Race 19 of 20	26
2023	(Italy) Andrea Kimi Antonelli	(Italy) Prema Racing	3	5	11	5	300	60.000	Race 18 of 20	39
2024	(Brazil) Rafael Câmara	(Italy) Prema Racing	7	7	12	7	309	61.800	Race 18 of 20	73
2025	(United Kingdom) Freddie Slater	(Italy) Prema Racing	6	8	12	7	313	62.600	Race 19 of 20	35
2026	(Italy) Emanuele Olivieri	(France) R-ace GP	2	2	9	3	218	45.228	Race 20 of 20	9

=== Teams' ===
Season	Team	Poles	Wins	Podiums	Fastest laps	Points	Clinched	Margin
2019	(Italy) Prema Powerteam	13	16	40	14	870	Race 23 of 24	390
2020	(Italy) Prema Powerteam	18	16	43	12	842	Race 22 of 24	347
2021	(France) R-ace GP	3	5	21	6	481	Race 20 of 20	59
2022	(Italy) Prema Racing	11	10	21	6	531	Race 18 of 20	110
2023	(Italy) Prema Racing	7	7	18	6	512	Race 20 of 20	2
2024	(Italy) Prema Racing	13	12	25	9	575	Race 17 of 20	264
2025	(France) R-ace GP	5	5	16	6	455	Race 20 of 20	25
2026	(France) R-ace GP	4	6	19	6	465	Race 19 of 20	83

=== Rookie ===
Season	Driver	Team	Poles	Wins (rookie)	Podiums	Fastest laps	Points (rookie)	Clinched	Margin
2019	(Denmark) Frederik Vesti	(Italy) Prema Powerteam	10	13 (14)	20	9	467 (506)	Race 21 of 24	125
2020	(Brazil) Gianluca Petecof	(Italy) Prema Powerteam	5	4 (7)	14	7	359 (430)	Race 24 of 24	43
2021	(France) Isack Hadjar	(France) R-ace GP	1	2 (8)	5	3	166	Race 20 of 20	44
2022	(Italy) Leonardo Fornaroli	(Italy) Trident	0	0	0	0	83	Race 20 of 20	4
2023	(Norway) Martinius Stenshorne	(France) R-ace GP	3	5 (13)	11	3	261	Race 18 of 20	150
2024	(Denmark) Noah Strømsted	(Italy) RPM	1	0 (7)	4	3	121	Race 20 of 20	24
2025	(United Kingdom) Dion Gowda	(Netherlands) Van Amersfoort Racing	0	0 (14)	0	0	38	Race 19 of 20	36
2026	(Italy) Emanuele Olivieri	(France) R-ace GP	2	2	9	3	218	Race 16 of 20	162

== Drivers graduated to FIA Formula 2 Championship ==
Driver	Formula Regional European				FIA Formula 2					Other major titles before FREC
Driver	Seasons	Races	Wins	Podiums	Seasons	First team	Races	Wins	Podiums	Other major titles before FREC
(Italy) **Kimi Antonelli**	2023	20	5	11	2024	Prema Racing	26	2	3	Italian F4 Championship; ADAC F4 Championship
(Estonia) Paul Aron	2021–2022	40	8	15	2023–2024	Trident	30	1	8	
(Sweden) Dino Beganovic	2021–2022	40	4	13	2024–2026	DAMS	57*	3*	12*	
(United States) Brad Benavides	2021	10	0	0	2023	PHM Racing by Charouz	18	0	0	
(United Kingdom) John Bennett	2024	2	0	0	2024–2026	Van Amersfoort Racing	57*	1*	2*	
(Poland) Roman Bilinski	2022–2024	52	0	2	2026	DAMS Lucas Oil	25*	0*	1*	
(Brazil) **Gabriel Bortoleto**	2021–2022	40	2	6	2024	Invicta Racing	28	2	8	
(Spain) Mari Boya	2021–2022	40	0	2	2026	Prema Racing	25*	0*	0*	
(United Kingdom) Olli Caldwell	2019	24	1	7	2021–2022	Campos Racing	26	0	0	
(Brazil) **Rafael Câmara**	2023–2024	40	8	16	2026	Invicta Racing	25*	3*	7*	
(Argentina) **Franco Colapinto**	2021	16	2	4	2023–2024	MP Motorsport	22	1	3	F4 Spanish Championship
(Paraguay) Joshua Dürksen	2022–2023	40	0	1	2024–2026	PHM AIX Racing	81*	8*	16*	
(Brazil) Emerson Fittipaldi Jr.	2023	20	0	0	2026	AIX Racing	25*	0*	1*	
(Brazil) Enzo Fittipaldi	2019	24	2	13	2021–2024	Charouz Racing System	67	2	13	Italian F4 Championship
(Italy) Leonardo Fornaroli	2022	20	0	0	2024–2025	Rodin Motorsport	26*	4*	8*	
(Germany) Oliver Goethe	2022–2024	20	0	0	2026	MP Motorsport	61*	0*	2*	
(France) **Isack Hadjar**	2021	20	2	4	2023–2024	Hitech Grand Prix	54	4	9	
(Norway) Dennis Hauger	2020	8	1	6	2022–2024	Prema Racing	78	5	13	Italian F4 Championship
(United Kingdom) Jake Hughes	2019	3	0	3	2020–2022	BWT HWA Racelab	26	0	0	BRDC F4 Championship
(Finland) Niko Kari	2019	3	0	0	2018	MP Motorsport	4	0	0	SMP F4 Championship
(Netherlands) Niels Koolen	2023	18	0	0	2024	AIX Racing	4	0	0	
(Monaco) Arthur Leclerc	2020	23	6	15	2023	DAMS	26	0	1	
(Mexico) Noel León	2022	24	2	13	2026	Campos Racing	25*	3*	5*	NACAM Formula 4 Championship
(France) Sami Meguetounif	2021–2023	41	0	4	2025	Trident	22	0	0	
(Italy) Gabriele Minì	2021–2022	40	3	13	2024–2026	Prema Racing	55*	2*	13*	Italian F4 Championship
(Colombia) Sebastián Montoya	2022	20	0	0	2025–2026	Prema Racing	52*	0*	4*	
(Italy) Matteo Nannini	2019–2020	18	0	0	2021	HWA Racelab	8	0	0	F4 UAE Championship
(Brazil) Gianluca Petecof	2020	23	4	14	2021	Campos Racing	6	0	0	
(Norway) Martinius Stenshorne	2023	20	5	11	2025–2026	Trident	31*	1*	4*	
(United Kingdom) Dan Ticktum	2019	6	0	2	2018, 2020–2021	BWT Arden	50	3	11	
(Netherlands) Laurens van Hoepen	2022–2023	40	0	2	2026	Campos Racing	31*	0*	5*	
(Denmark) Frederik Vesti	2019	24	13	20	2022–2023	ART Grand Prix	53	7	15	
(Estonia) Jüri Vips	2020	9	0	3	2020–2022	DAMS	59	3	12	ADAC F4 Championship
(Australia) James Wharton	2024	20	4	10	2025	Trident	2	0	0	F4 UAE Championship
(Japan) Hiyu Yamakoshi	2025	20	0	2	2026	Van Amersfoort Racing	3*	0*	0*	
(Germany) Lirim Zendeli	2019	3	0	2	2021–2022	MP Motorsport	19	0	0	ADAC F4 Championship

* Season still in progress.

Notes:

- Gold background denotes Formula Regional European champion.
- **Bold** denotes a driver graduated to Formula One.

== Circuits ==
- **Bold** denotes a circuit is used in the 2026 season.
- **Italic** denotes a circuit will be used in the 2027 season.

Number	Circuits	Rounds	Years
1	(France) **Circuit Paul Ricard**	8	2019–present
1	(Austria) **Red Bull Ring**	8	2019–present
1	(Italy) **Imola Circuit**	8	2019–present
1	(Italy) **Monza Circuit**	8	2019–present
5	(Spain) **Circuit de Barcelona-Catalunya**	7	2019–2025, 2027
6	(Hungary) **Hungaroring**	6	2019, 2022–present
6	(Italy) Mugello Circuit	6	2019–2024
6	(Netherlands) **Circuit Zandvoort**	6	2021–present
6	(Belgium) **Circuit de Spa-Francorchamps**	6	2021–present
10	(Germany) **Hockenheimring**	4	2023–2026
11	(Italy) Vallelunga Circuit	2	2019–2020
11	(Italy) Misano World Circuit	2	2020, 2025
11	Circuit de Monaco	2	2021–2022
14	(Spain) Circuit Ricardo Tormo	1	2021
15	(Portugal) **Algarve International Circuit**	0	2027
15	(United Kingdom) **Silverstone Circuit**	0	2027
