= Nicola Marinangeli =

Italian racing driver (born 2003)

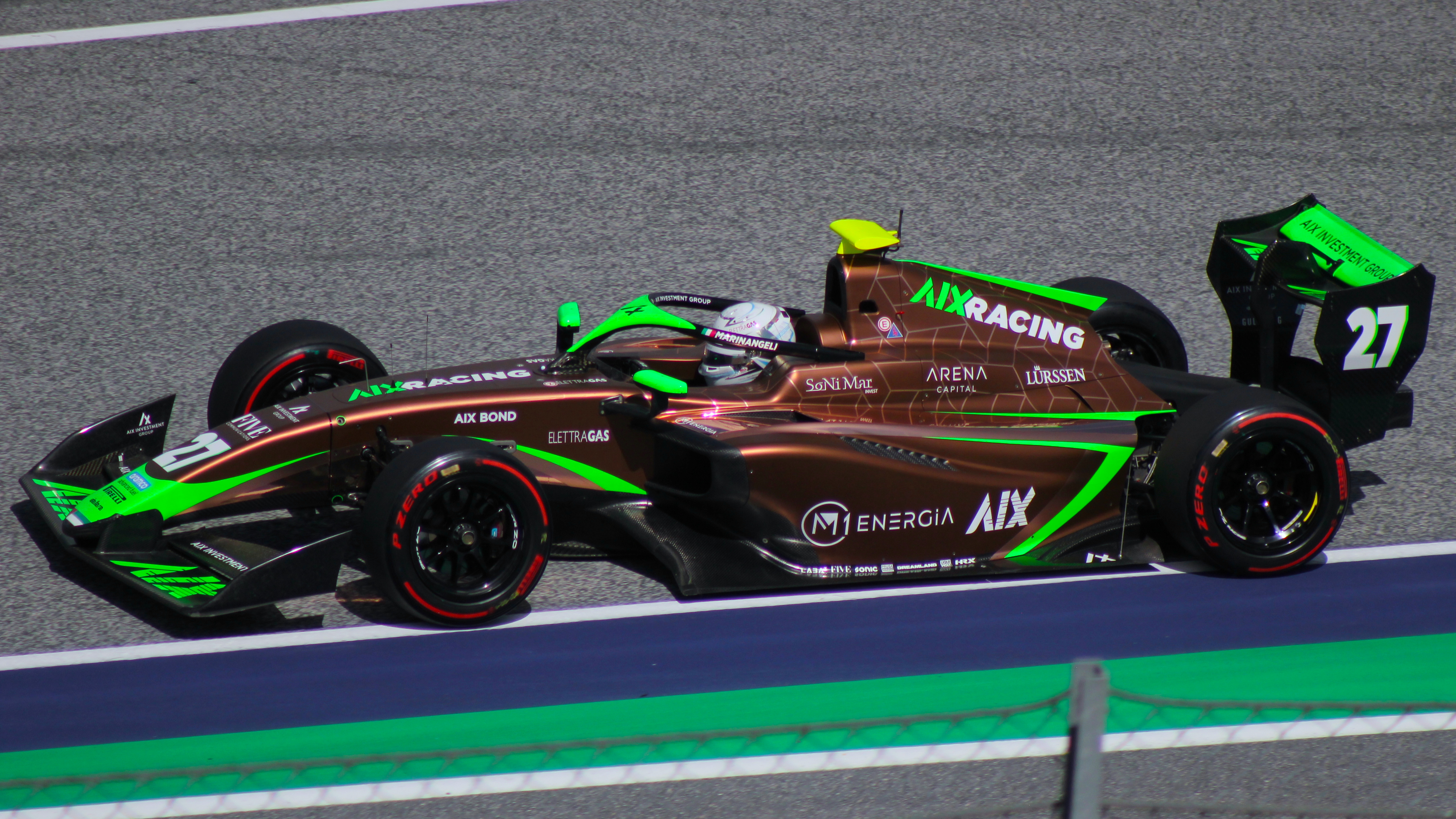
- Marinangeli driving the Dallara F3 2025 during the 2025 Spielberg Formula 3 round
- Nationality: (Italy) Italian
- Born: 14 May 2003 (age 23) Foligno, Umbria, Italy

FIA Formula 3 Championship career
- Debut season: 2025
- Current team: AIX Racing
- Categorisation: FIA Silver
- Car number: 27
- Starts: 3
- Wins: 0
- Podiums: 0
- Poles: 0
- Fastest laps: 0
- Best finish: 36th in 2025

Previous series
- 2023-24–2024-25 2023–2024 2023 2022 2022 2021 2020–2022 2020 2019–2020 2019 2019: Asian Le Mans Series International GT Open; GT World Challenge Europe Sprint Cup; Ferrari Challenge Europe; Euroformula Open Championship; F3 Asian Championship; FR European Championship; Formula Renault Eurocup; Formula 4 UAE Championship; Italian F4 Championship; ADAC Formula 4

Nicola Marinangeli (born 14 May 2003) is an Italian racing driver who last competed in the FIA Formula 3 Championship for AIX Racing.

== Single-seater career ==
=== Lower formula ===
==== 2018 ====
Born in Foligno, Marinangeli started his career in 2018 in the Italian F4 Championship for DR Formula. He drove in the final event at Mugello and scored a best finish of 22nd.

==== 2019 ====
Following that, Marinangeli signed for Xcel Motorsport to drive in the 2019 F4 UAE Championship. However, he finished last in the standings, with 37 points and being one of only three drivers not to score a podium throughout the season. He then competed full-time in Italian F4 with Bhai Tech Racing. He scored no points and finished 29th in the drivers' standings.

==== 2020 ====
In January 2020, Marinangeli once again competed in the F4 UAE Championship. He won one race and finished fifth in the drivers' standings.

=== Formula Renault Eurocup ===
Marinangeli was signed by Bhaitech Racing to drive in the final season of the Formula Renault Eurocup. Both of his teammates would beat him in the championship, where Marinangeli only scored one point.

=== Formula Regional European Championship ===
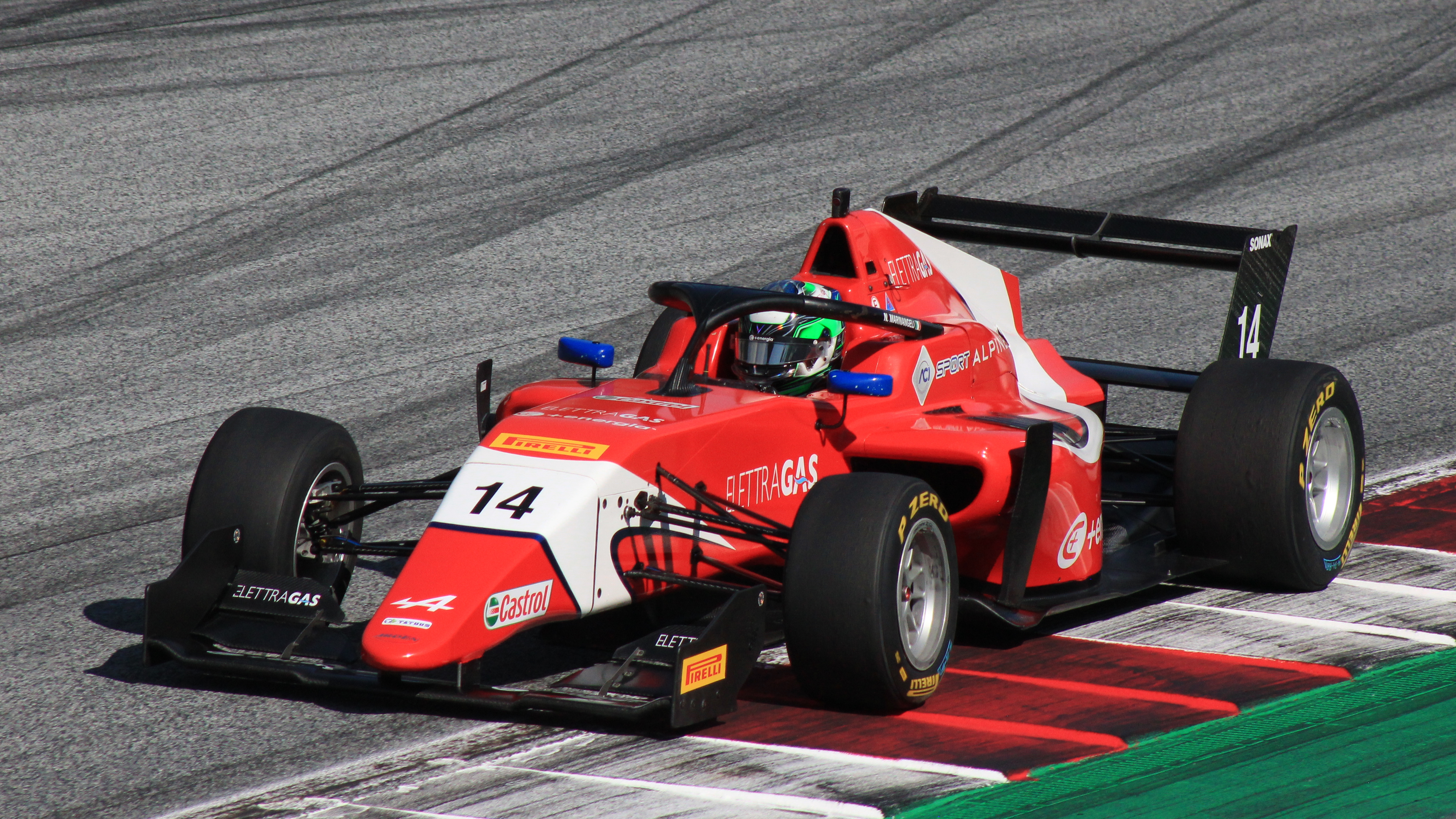
Marinangeli racing in the 2021 Formula Regional European Championship at the Red Bull Ring.

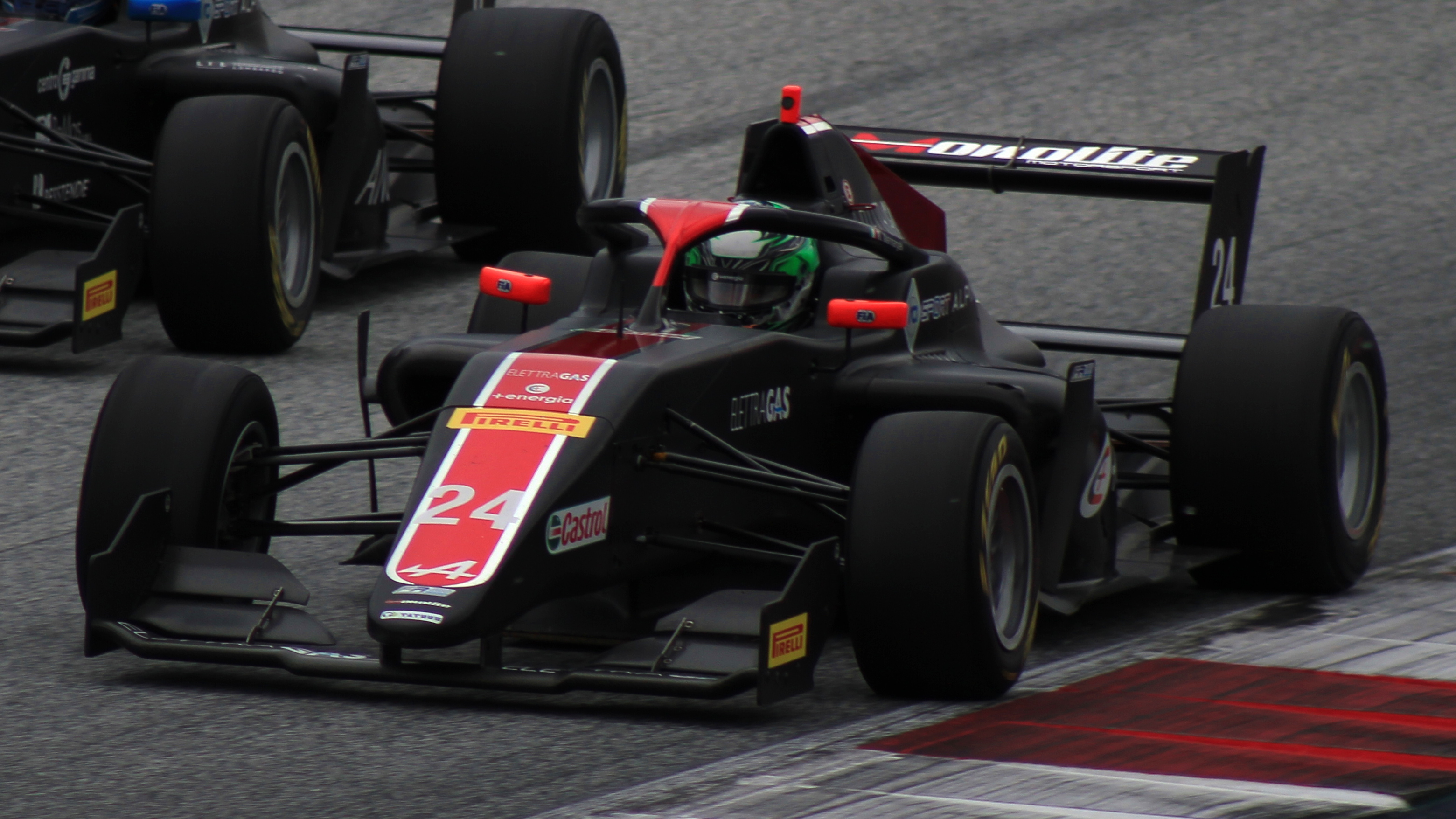
Marinangeli racing in the 2022 Formula Regional European Championship at the Red Bull Ring.

In 2020, Marinangeli made his debut in the Formula Regional European Championship for KIC Motorsport at Imola. In the five races he competed in, he scored six points, leading to him finishing 17th and last in the drivers' championship.

Marinangeli joined Arden Motorsport for the 2021 season, partnering Alex Quinn and William Alatalo. Despite regular finishes in the top-twenty, Marinangeli was unable to reach the points once during the season, leading to 30th place in the standings at the end of the campaign.

=== FIA Formula 3 Championship ===
==== 2021 ====
Marinangeli tested for Charouz Racing System on the final two days of the FIA Formula 3 post-season test in November 2021.

==== 2025 ====
On 17 February 2025, it was confirmed that Marinangeli would make his FIA Formula 3 debut in the 2025 season after a spell out of single-seater racing, driving for AIX Racing. He experienced a challenging season, often languishing at the back of the grid; he took a best finish of 19th thrice and finished 36th in the standings, albeit second-last. Marinangeli was the lowest-finishing full-time driver of the season.

=== Euroformula Open Championship ===
In February 2022, Marinangeli was announced by Dutch team Van Amersfoort Racing as one of their drivers for that year's Euroformula Open season.

== Sportscar career ==
Marinangeli made his first foray into sportscar racing during the back end of 2022, contesting two rounds of the Ferrari Challenge Europe at Mugello and Imola.

The following year, it was announced that Marinangeli would be joining AF Corse in the International GT Open series, driving alongside Riccardo Agostini. He would also partner Sean Hudspeth in the Silver Cup class of the GT World Challenge Europe Sprint Cup.

== Racing record ==
=== Racing career summary ===
Season	Series	Team	Races	Wins	Poles	F/Laps	Podiums	Points	Position
2018	Italian F4 Championship	DR Formula	3	0	0	0	0	0	43rd
2019	Formula 4 UAE Championship	Xcel Motorsport	15	0	0	0	0	37	11th
2019	Formula 4 UAE Championship - Trophy Round	Xcel Motorsport	2	0	0	1	1	N/A	NC
2019	Italian F4 Championship	Bhai Tech Racing	20	0	0	0	0	0	29th
2020	Formula 4 UAE Championship	Xcel Motorsport	19	1	1	1	9	202	5th
2020	Formula Renault Eurocup	Bhaitech Racing	16	0	0	0	0	1	21st
2020	Formula Regional European Championship	KIC Motorsport	5	0	0	0	0	6	17th
2021	Formula Regional European Championship	Arden Motorsport	20	0	0	0	0	0	30th
2021	F3 Asian Championship	Motorscape	15	0	0	0	0	0	21st
2022	Formula Regional Asian Championship	Evans GP	15	0	0	0	0	1	24th
2022	Euroformula Open Championship	Van Amersfoort Racing	8	0	0	0	0	36	12th
2022	Formula Regional European Championship	Monolite Racing	8	0	0	0	0	0	37th
2022	Ferrari Challenge Europe - Trofeo Pirelli (Pro)	Chiuini De Poi – Perugia	4	0	0	0	0	16	9th
2023	GT World Challenge Europe Sprint Cup	AF Corse	10	0	0	0	0	0	NC
2023	GT World Challenge Europe Sprint Cup - Silver	AF Corse	10	0	2	0	1	55	6th
2023	International GT Open	AF Corse	13	1	0	0	3	90	6th
2023-24	Asian Le Mans Series - GT	Dragon Racing	3	0	0	0	0	0	30th
2024	International GT Open	AF Corse	14	2	0	0	5	104	**3rd**
2024-25	Asian Le Mans Series - GT	Dragon Racing	6	0	0	0	0	0	NC
2025	FIA Formula 3 Championship	AIX Racing	19	0	0	0	0	0	36th

=== Complete Italian F4 Championship results ===
(key) (Races in bold indicate pole position) (Races in italics indicate fastest lap)

Year	Team	1	2	3	4	5	6	7	8	9	10	11	12	13	14	15	16	17	18	19	20	21	22	Pos	Points
2018	DR Formula	ADR; 1	ADR; 2	ADR; 3	LEC; 1	LEC; 2	LEC; 3	MNZ; 1	MNZ; 2	MNZ; 3	MIS; 1	MIS; 2	MIS; 3	IMO; 1	IMO; 2	IMO; 3	VLL; 1	VLL; 2	VLL; 3	MUG; 1; 22	MUG; 2 Ret	MUG; 3; 29		43rd	0
2019	Bhai Tech Racing	VLL; 1; 16	VLL; 2; 13	VLL; 3; 27	MIS; 1; 22	MIS; 2; 29	MIS; 3 C	HUN; 1; 14	HUN; 2 Ret	HUN; 3; 19	RBR; 1; 24	RBR; 2; 24	RBR; 3 Ret	IMO; 1; 15	IMO; 2; 27	IMO; 3; 21	IMO; 4; 17	MUG; 1 Ret	MUG; 2; 25	MUG; 3; 13	MNZ; 1; 14	MNZ; 2; 27	MNZ; 3; 20	29th	0

=== Complete Formula 4 UAE Championship results ===
(key) (Races in bold indicate pole position; races in italics indicate fastest lap)

Year	Team	1	2	3	4	5	6	7	8	9	10	11	12	13	14	15	16	17	18	19	20	DC	Points
2019	Xcel Motorsport	DUB1; 1; 9	DUB1; 2; 8	DUB1; 3; 9	DUB1; 4; 8	YMC1; 1; 9	YMC1; 2 Ret	YMC1; 3; 10	YMC1; 4; 10	DUB2; 1 Ret	DUB2; 2; 8	DUB2; 3; 10	DUB2; 4 Ret	YMC2; 1; 8	YMC2; 2 DNS	YMC2; 3; 7	YMC2; 4; 7	DUB3; 1	DUB3; 2	DUB3; 3	DUB3; 4	11th	37
2020	Xcel Motorsport	DUB1; 1; 3	DUB1; 2; 3	DUB1; 3; 2	DUB1; 4 C	YMC1; 1; 2	YMC1; 2; 5	YMC1; 3; 3	YMC1; 4 Ret	YMC2; 1; 4	YMC2; 2; 1	YMC2; 3 Ret	YMC2; 4; 2	DUB2; 1; 5	DUB2; 2; 2	DUB2; 3; 9	DUB2; 4; 3	DUB3; 1; 10	DUB3; 2 Ret	DUB3; 3; 5	DUB3; 4 Ret	5th	202

=== Complete Formula Renault Eurocup results ===
(key) (Races in bold indicate pole position) (Races in italics indicate fastest lap)

Year	Team	1	2	3	4	5	6	7	8	9	10	11	12	13	14	15	16	17	18	19	20	Pos	Points
2020	Bhaitech Racing	MNZ; 1; 12	MNZ; 2; 11	IMO; 1; 17	IMO; 2; 14	NÜR; 1	NÜR; 2	MAG; 1	MAG; 2	ZAN; 1; 17	ZAN; 2; 15	CAT; 1; 18	CAT; 2 Ret	SPA; 1; 16	SPA; 2; 11	IMO; 1; 13	IMO; 2 Ret	HOC; 1; 13	HOC; 2; 15	LEC; 1; 18	LEC; 2; 13	21st	1

=== Complete Formula Regional European Championship results ===
(key) (Races in bold indicate pole position) (Races in italics indicate fastest lap)

Year	Team	1	2	3	4	5	6	7	8	9	10	11	12	13	14	15	16	17	18	19	20	21	22	23	24	DC	Points
2020	KIC Motorsport	MIS; 1	MIS; 2	MIS; 3	LEC; 1	LEC; 2	LEC; 3	RBR; 1	RBR; 2	RBR; 3	MUG; 1	MUG; 2	MUG; 3	MNZ; 1	MNZ; 2	MNZ; 3	CAT; 1	CAT; 2	CAT; 3	IMO; 1; 9	IMO; 2; 10	IMO; 3; 11	VLL; 1; 10	VLL; 2 C	VLL; 3; 9	17th	6
2021	Arden Motorsport	IMO; 1 Ret	IMO; 2; 18	CAT; 1 Ret	CAT; 2; 21	MCO; 1 Ret	MCO; 2 Ret	LEC; 1; 25	LEC; 2 Ret	ZAN; 1; 27	ZAN; 2; 28	SPA; 1; 26	SPA; 2 Ret	RBR; 1; 20	RBR; 2; 21	VAL; 1; 31	VAL; 2; 18	MUG; 1; 30	MUG; 2; 28	MNZ; 1; 17	MNZ; 2 Ret					30th	0
2022	Monolite Racing	MNZ; 1	MNZ; 2	IMO; 1	IMO; 2	MCO; 1	MCO; 2	LEC; 1	LEC; 2	ZAN; 1	ZAN; 2	HUN; 1	HUN; 2	SPA; 1 Ret	SPA; 2; 26	RBR; 1; 23	RBR; 2; 25	CAT; 1; 30	CAT; 2; 27	MUG; 1; 29	MUG; 2; 31					37th	0

=== Complete Formula Regional Asian Championship results ===
(key) (Races in bold indicate pole position) (Races in italics indicate the fastest lap of top ten finishers)

Year	Entrant	1	2	3	4	5	6	7	8	9	10	11	12	13	14	15	DC	Points
2021	Motorscape	DUB; 1; 15	DUB; 2; 13	DUB; 3; 14	ABU; 1; 14	ABU; 2; 14	ABU; 3 Ret	ABU; 1; 13	ABU; 2 Ret	ABU; 3; 14	DUB; 1; 14	DUB; 2; 16	DUB; 3; 15	ABU; 1; 12	ABU; 2; 15	ABU; 3; 18	21st	0
2022	Evans GP	ABU; 1 Ret	ABU; 2 Ret	ABU; 3; 13	DUB; 1; 14	DUB; 2; 11	DUB; 3; 15	DUB; 1; 14	DUB; 2; 10	DUB; 3; 11	DUB; 1; 14	DUB; 2; 17	DUB; 3; 13	ABU; 1 Ret	ABU; 2; 13	ABU; 3; 16	24th	1

=== Complete Euroformula Open Championship results ===
(key) (Races in bold indicate pole position; races in italics indicate points for the fastest lap of top ten finishers)

Year	Entrant	1	2	3	4	5	6	7	8	9	10	11	12	13	14	15	16	17	18	19	20	21	22	23	24	25	26	DC	Points
2022	Van Amersfoort Racing	POR; 1; 8	POR; 2 Ret	POR; 3; 6*	PAU; 1 Ret	PAU; 2; 7*	LEC; 1; 6*	LEC; 2; 9	LEC; 3; 8	SPA; 1	SPA; 2	SPA; 3	HUN; 1	HUN; 2	HUN; 3	IMO; 1	IMO; 2	IMO; 3	RBR; 1	RBR; 2	RBR; 3	MNZ; 1	MNZ; 2	MNZ; 3	CAT; 1	CAT; 2	CAT; 3	12th	36

=== Complete International GT Open results ===
Year	Team	Car	Class	1	2	3	4	5	6	7	8	9	10	11	12	13	14	Pos.	Points
2023	AF Corse	Ferrari 296 GT3	Pro	PRT; 1; 5	PRT; 2; 9	SPA; 5	HUN; 1; 6	HUN; 2; 5	LEC; 1; 5	LEC; 2; 9	RBR; 1; 4	RBR; 2; 1	MNZ; 1; 5	MNZ; 2; 2	CAT; 1; 2	CAT; 2; 12		6th	90
2024	AF Corse	Ferrari 296 GT3	Pro	PRT; 1; 6	PRT; 2 Ret	HOC; 1; 3	HOC; 2 Ret	SPA; 14	HUN; 1; 2	HUN; 2; 5	LEC; 1; 4	LEC; 2; 1	RBR; 1; 11	RBR; 2; 2	CAT; 1; 6	**CAT**; **2**; 1	MNZ; 4	3rd	104

^{*}Season still in progress.

=== Complete GT World Challenge results ===
==== GT World Challenge Europe Sprint Cup ====
Year	Team	Car	Class	1	2	3	4	5	6	7	8	9	10	Pos.	Points
2023	AF Corse	Ferrari 296 GT3	Silver	BRH; 1; 23	**BRH**; **2** Ret	MIS; 1; 28	**MIS**; **2**; 26	HOC; 1; 17	HOC; 2; 24	VAL; 1; 31	VAL; 2; 26	ZAN; 1; 21	ZAN; 2; 19	6th	55

^{*}Season still in progress.

=== Complete Asian Le Mans Series results ===
(key) (Races in bold indicate pole position) (Races in italics indicate fastest lap)

Year	Team	Class	Car	Engine	1	2	3	4	5	6	Pos.	Points
2023–24	Dragon Racing	GT	Ferrari 296 GT3	Ferrari F163 3.0 L Turbo V6	SEP; 1	SEP; 2	DUB; 14	ABU; 1; 12	ABU; 2; 12		30th	0
2024–25	Dragon Racing	GT	Ferrari 296 GT3	Ferrari F163 3.0 L Turbo V6	SEP; 1	SEP; 2	DUB; 2; 19	DUB; 2; 17	ABU; 1; 10	ABU; 2; 11	NC†	0

† As Marinangeli was a guest driver, he was ineligible for points.

=== Complete FIA Formula 3 Championship results ===
(key) (Races in bold indicate pole position) (Races in italics indicate fastest lap)

Year	Entrant	1	2	3	4	5	6	7	8	9	10	11	12	13	14	15	16	17	18	19	20	DC	Points
2025	AIX Racing	MEL; SPR; 20	MEL; FEA; 27	BHR; SPR; Ret	BHR; FEA; 25	IMO; SPR; Ret	IMO; FEA; Ret	MON; SPR; 19	MON; FEA; 21	CAT; SPR; 21	CAT; FEA; 23	RBR; SPR; 19	RBR; FEA; 25	SIL; SPR; 28	SIL; FEA; 26	SPA; SPR; 27	SPA; FEA; C	HUN; SPR; 21	HUN; FEA; 23	MNZ; SPR; 20	MNZ; FEA; 19	36th	0

* Season still in progress.
