= Hamda Al Qubaisi =

Emirati racing driver

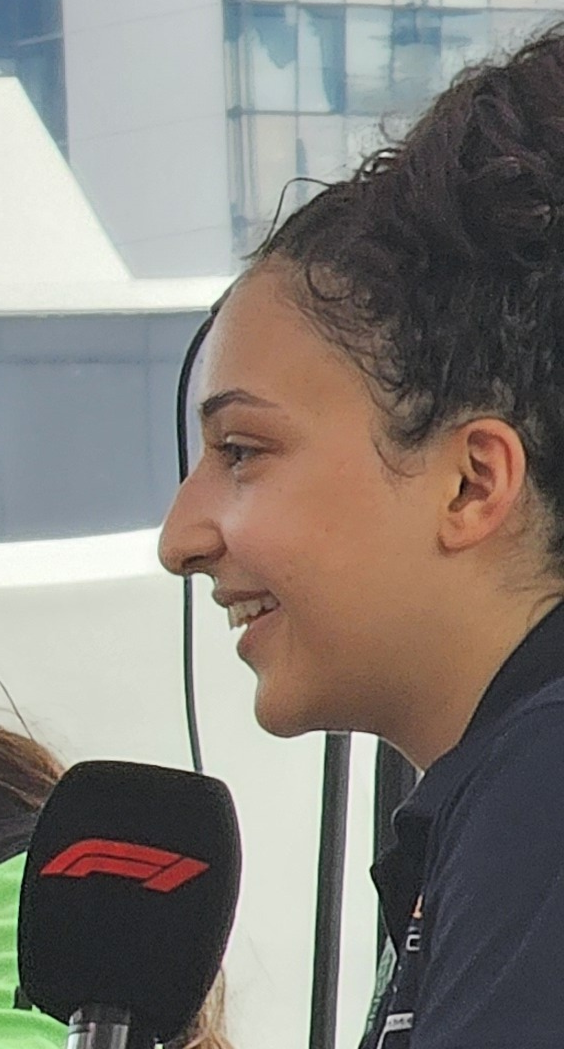
- Al Qubaisi in 2024
- Nationality: (United Arab Emirates) Emirati
- Born: 8 August 2002 (age 24) Abu Dhabi, United Arab Emirates
- Relatives: Khaled Al Qubaisi (father); Amna Al Qubaisi (sister)

Ligier European Series career
- Debut season: 2025
- Current team: Team Virage
- Car number: 88
- Starts: 11 (11 entries)
- Wins: 0
- Podiums: 3
- Poles: 1
- Fastest laps: 1
- Best finish: 4th in 2025

Previous series
- 2023–2024; 2024; 2020–2021, 2023; 2022; 2022; 2019–2021: F1 Academy; F4 Saudi Arabian; F4 UAE; FR European; FR Asian; Italian F4

Championship titles
- 2020: Italian F4 Woman Trophy

Hamda Al Qubaisi (Arabic: حمدة القبيسي; born 8 August 2002) is an Emirati racing driver who currently competes in the Ligier European Series with Team Virage in the #88 entry alongside her sister Amna. In June 2021, she became the first woman in the history of Italian F4 to score a podium, achieving third place in the first race of the season at Misano.

== Career ==
=== Karting ===
Al Qubaisi started karting in 2015 and was the first Emirati to be invited to the FIA-sponsored CIK-FIA Karting Academy Trophy in 2016. She finished third in the IAME X30 Championship in 2017.

=== Lower formulae ===
==== 2019 ====
Al Qubaisi made her debut in Italian F4 in the middle of the 2019 season when she joined her older sister Amna at the Abu Dhabi Racing by Prema team, run in cooperation with the Iron Lynx structure.

==== 2020 ====
After winning three races on home soil in the United Arab Emirates' F4 series in 2020, Al Qubaisi returned for a full campaign in Italy with Iron Lynx and claimed two points finishes.

==== 2021 ====
In the 2021 Formula 4 UAE Championship, Al Qubaisi secured a further three wins, one pole position, and six podiums, to clinch fourth place in the standings once more. In her main campaign, she took part in the Italian F4 Championship. During the round held at Misano in June 2021, Al Qubaisi became the first ever woman to step on the podium in the championship, taking third place behind Leonardo Fornaroli and Oliver Bearman. In the process, she also managed to secure her first podium in Europe. She added three more points finishes and ended the championship in 17th place, with 24 points.

=== Formula Regional ===
During pre-season, Al Qubaisi took part in the 2022 Formula Regional Asian Championship with Evans GP. Unfortunately, she was unable to take points and finished the championship 28th.

For 2022, Al Qubaisi contested a full season of the Formula Regional European Championship with Prema Powerteam.

=== FIA Formula 3 Championship ===
Al Qubaisi was selected to take part in testing the FIA Formula 3 car on 16–17 September 2022, alongside three other women at Magny-Cours.

=== F1 Academy ===
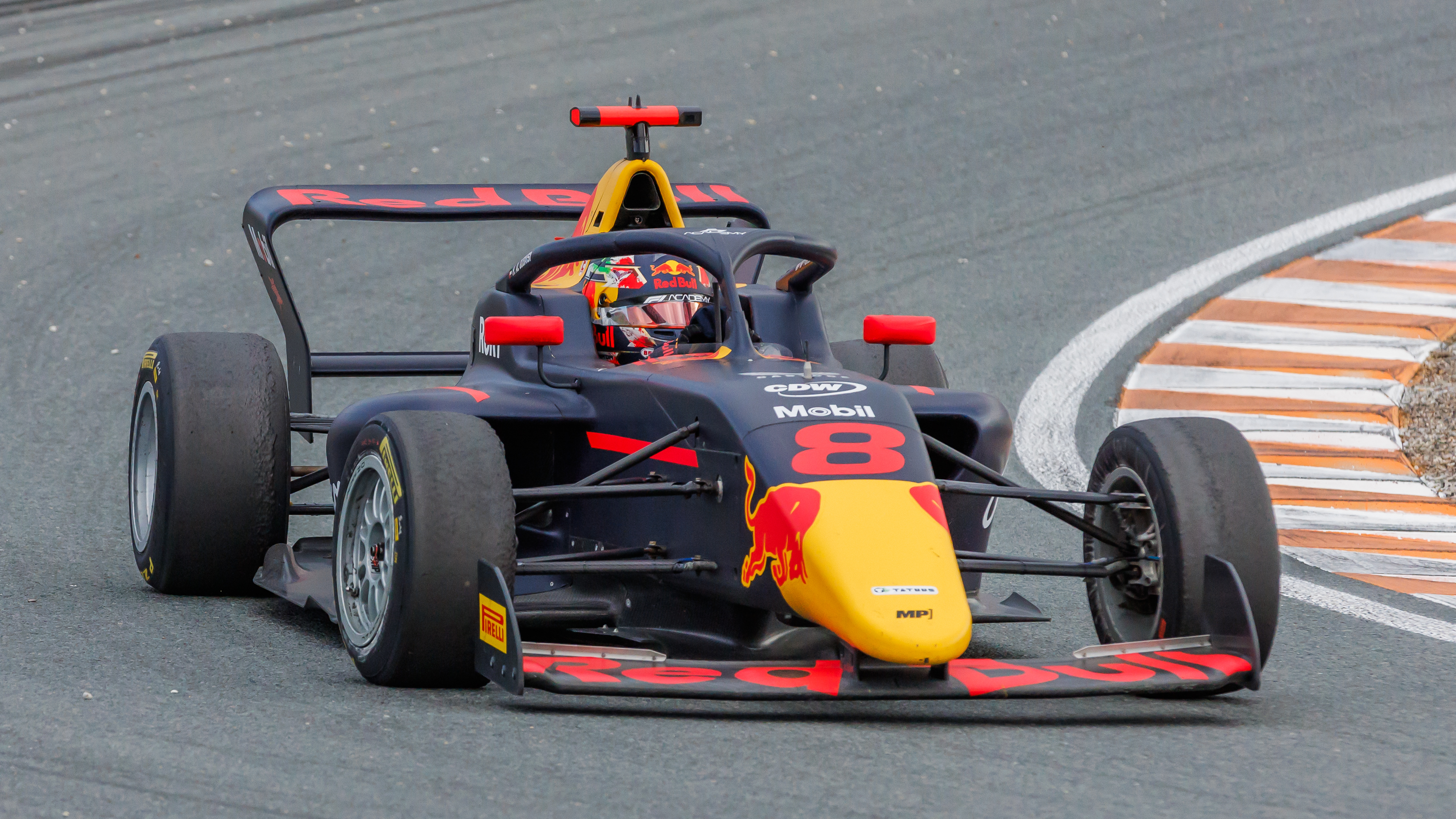
Al Qubaisi competing in an F1 Academy race at Zandvoort in 2024.

Al Qubaisi and her sister Amna signed with MP Motorsport for the 2023 F1 Academy season. She placed third in the championship with four wins. She re-signed with the team for the 2024 season and joined the Red Bull Academy Programme to represent Red Bull Racing. She finished the season in fifth place.

== Personal life ==
Al Qubaisi is the younger sister of Amna Al Qubaisi and the daughter of Khaled Al Qubaisi, former CEO of Real Estate and Infrastructure Investment platform at Mubadala Investment Company, and who is also an accomplished figure in UAE motorsport. She had been attending New York University Abu Dhabi, but continued with her schooling in Italy until October 2021.

Al Qubaisi is married to Saudi racing driver Omar Al Dereyaane.

== Karting record ==
=== Karting career summary ===
Season	Series	Team	Position
2018	IAME Series UAE - X30 Senior	Daman Speed Academy	5th
2018	Rotax Max Challenge Grand Finals - Senior Max	Al Ain Raceway	49th
2019	IAME Series UAE - X30 Shifter		6th
2020	IAME Series UAE - X30 Shifter		4th

== Racing record ==
=== Racing career summary ===
Season	Series	Team	Races	Wins	Poles	F/Laps	Podiums	Points	Position
2019	Italian F4 Championship	Abu Dhabi Racing by Prema	6	0	0	0	0	0	42nd
2019	Formula 4 UAE Championship - Trophy Round	Abu Dhabi Racing	2	0	0	0	0	N/A	NC
2020	Formula 4 UAE Championship	Abu Dhabi Racing	19	3	7	6	12	258	4th
2020	Italian F4 Championship	Abu Dhabi Racing	19	0	0	0	0	3	25th
2020	ADAC Formula 4 Championship	Iron Lynx	3	0	0	0	0	0	NC†
2021	Formula 4 UAE Championship	Abu Dhabi Racing by Prema	19	3	0	2	7	221	4th
2021	Italian F4 Championship	Prema Powerteam	21	0	0	0	1	24	17th
2021	ADAC Formula 4 Championship	Prema Powerteam	6	0	0	0	0	0	21st
2021	Formula 4 UAE Championship - Trophy Round	Abu Dhabi Racing by Prema	1	0	0	0	0	N/A	6th
2022	Formula Regional Asian Championship	Abu Dhabi Racing by Prema	15	0	0	0	0	0	28th
2022	Formula Regional European Championship	Prema Racing	15	0	0	0	0	0	38th
2023	Formula 4 UAE Championship	Yas Heat Racing Academy	15	0	0	0	0	12	20th
2023	F1 Academy	MP Motorsport	21	4	2	5	7	207	**3rd**
2023	Formula 4 UAE Championship - Trophy Round	MP Motorsport	2	0	0	0	0	N/A	NC
2023	F4 Saudi Arabian Championship - Trophy Event	Altawkilat Meritus.GP	8	0	0	0	1	N/A	NC
2024	F4 Saudi Arabian Championship	Altawkilat Meritus.GP	17	1	0	1	5	116.5	4th
2024	F1 Academy	MP Motorsport	14	0	0	0	3	133	5th
2025	F4 Middle East Championship	AKCEL GP / PHM Racing	3	0	0	0	0	0	31st
2025	Ligier European Series - JS P4	Team Virage	11	0	1	1	3	104	4th

^{†} As Al Qubaisi was a guest driver, she was ineligible to score points.

=== Complete Italian F4 Championship results ===
(key) (Races in bold indicate pole position) (Races in italics indicate fastest lap)

Year	Team	1	2	3	4	5	6	7	8	9	10	11	12	13	14	15	16	17	18	19	20	21	22	Pos	Points
2019	Abu Dhabi Racing by Prema	VLL; 1	VLL; 2	VLL; 3	MIS; 1	MIS; 2	MIS; 3	HUN; 1	HUN; 2	HUN; 3	RBR; 1; 28	RBR; 2; 22	RBR; 3; 26	IMO; 1	IMO; 2	IMO; 3	IMO; 4	MUG; 1	MUG; 2	MUG; 3	MNZ; 1; 25	MNZ; 2; 26	MNZ; 3; 21	42nd	0
2020	Abu Dhabi Racing by Prema	MIS; 1 Ret	MIS; 2; 18	MIS; 3; 14	IMO1; 1; 14	IMO1; 2; 22	IMO1; 3; 11	RBR; 1; 10	RBR; 2; 19	RBR; 3 DNS	MUG; 1; 23	MUG; 2; 25	MUG; 3; 23	MNZ; 1 Ret	MNZ; 2 Ret	MNZ; 3; 9	IMO2; 1; 29†	IMO2; 2 Ret	IMO2; 3; 22	VLL; 1; 24	VLL; 2 C	VLL; 3; 27		25th	3
2021	Prema Powerteam	LEC; 1; 30	LEC; 2; 27	LEC; 3; 29†	MIS; 1; 3	MIS; 2; 20	MIS; 3; 9	VLL; 1; 12	VLL; 2; 16	VLL; 3; 7	IMO; 1; 18	IMO; 2; 21	IMO; 3; 12	RBR; 1; 19	RBR; 2 Ret	RBR; 3; 18	MUG; 1 Ret	MUG; 2; 15	MUG; 3; 17	MNZ; 1; 10	MNZ; 2 Ret	MNZ; 3; 29†		17th	24

=== Complete Formula 4 UAE Championship results ===
(key) (Races in bold indicate pole position; races in italics indicate fastest lap)

Year	Team	1	2	3	4	5	6	7	8	9	10	11	12	13	14	15	16	17	18	19	20	DC	Points
2020	Abu Dhabi Racing	**DUB1**; **1**; 6	DUB1; 2; 2	**DUB1**; **3** Ret	DUB1; 4 C	**YMC1**; **1**; 7	YMC1; 2; 10	**YMC1**; **3**; 2	YMC1; 4; 2	**YMC2**; **1**; 2	YMC2; 2; 2	**YMC2**; **3**; 1	YMC2; 4; 10†	DUB2; 1; 3	DUB2; 2; 3	DUB2; 3; 3	DUB2; 4; 2	**DUB3**; **1**; 1	DUB3; 2; 7	DUB3; 3; 6	DUB3; 4; 1	4th	258
2021	Abu Dhabi Racing by Prema	DUB1; 1; 3	DUB1; 2; 5	DUB1; 3; 2	DUB1; 4; 6	YMC1; 1; 5	YMC1; 2; 3	YMC1; 3; 5	YMC1; 4; 1	DUB2; 1 Ret	DUB2; 2; 4	DUB2; 3; 4	DUB2; 4 DNS	YMC2; 1 Ret	YMC2; 2; 4	YMC2; 3; 1	YMC2; 4; 8	DUB3; 1; 1	DUB3; 2; 9	DUB3; 3; 3	DUB3; 4; 10	4th	221
2023	Yas Heat Racing by Xcel	DUB1; 1; 15	DUB1; 2; 20	DUB1; 3; 12	KMT1; 1; 30	KMT1; 2; 11	KMT1; 3; 20	KMT2; 1; 32	KMT2; 2; 7	KMT2; 3; 20	DUB2; 1; 14	DUB2; 2; 34	DUB2; 3; 22	YMC; 1; 24	YMC; 2; 28	YMC; 3; 7						20th	12

=== Complete ADAC Formula 4 Championship results ===
(key) (Races in bold indicate pole position) (Races in italics indicate the fastest lap of top ten finishers)

Year	Team	1	2	3	4	5	6	7	8	9	10	11	12	13	14	15	16	17	18	19	20	21	DC	Points
2020	Iron Lynx	LAU1; 1	LAU1; 2	LAU1; 3	NÜR1; 1	NÜR1; 2	NÜR1; 3	HOC; 1; 10	HOC; 2; 16	HOC; 3; 14	NÜR2; 1	NÜR2; 2	NÜR2; 3	RBR; 1	RBR; 2	RBR; 3	LAU2; 1	LAU2; 2	LAU2; 3	OSC; 1	OSC; 2	OSC; 3	NC†	0
2021	Prema Powerteam	RBR; 1; 22†	RBR; 2 Ret	RBR; 3 Ret	ZAN; 1; 12	ZAN; 2; 12	ZAN; 3 Ret	HOC1; 1	HOC1; 2	HOC1; 3	SAC; 1	SAC; 2	SAC; 3	HOC2; 1	HOC2; 2	HOC2; 3	NÜR; 1	NÜR; 2	NÜR; 3				21st	0

^{†} As Al Qubaisi was a guest driver, she was ineligible for points.

=== Complete Formula Regional Asian Championship results ===
(key) (Races in bold indicate pole position) (Races in italics indicate the fastest lap of top ten finishers)

Year	Entrant	1	2	3	4	5	6	7	8	9	10	11	12	13	14	15	DC	Points
2022	Abu Dhabi Racing by Prema	ABU; 1; 12	ABU; 2 Ret	ABU; 3; 14	DUB; 1; 20	DUB; 2; 17	DUB; 3; 16	DUB; 1; 18	DUB; 2; 16	DUB; 3; 16	DUB; 1; 17	DUB; 2 Ret	DUB; 3; 18	ABU; 1; 18	ABU; 2; 17	ABU; 3; 21	28th	0

=== Complete Formula Regional European Championship results ===
(key) (Races in bold indicate pole position) (Races in italics indicate fastest lap)

Year	Team	1	2	3	4	5	6	7	8	9	10	11	12	13	14	15	16	17	18	19	20	DC	Points
2022	Prema Racing	MNZ; 1; 30	MNZ; 2 Ret	IMO; 1 Ret	IMO; 2; 31	MCO; 1; 27	MCO; 2 DNQ	LEC; 1; 29	LEC; 2; 26	ZAN; 1; 30	ZAN; 2; 27	HUN; 1; 31	HUN; 2; 26	SPA; 1; 26	SPA; 2 Ret	RBR; 1; 29	RBR; 2; 24	CAT; 1	CAT; 2	MUG; 1	MUG; 2	38th	0

=== Complete F1 Academy results ===
(key) (Races in bold indicate pole position; races in italics indicate fastest lap)

Year	Team	1	2	3	4	5	6	7	8	9	10	11	12	13	14	15	16	17	18	19	20	21	DC	Points
2023	MP Motorsport	RBR; 1; 7	RBR; 2; 5	RBR; 3; 2	CRT; 1; 1	CRT; 2; 3	CRT; 3; 5	CAT; 1 Ret	CAT; 2; 5	CAT; 3; 2	**ZAN**; **1**; 1	ZAN; 2; 9	**ZAN**; **3**; 1	MNZ; 1; 8	MNZ; 2; 10	MNZ; 3 Ret	LEC; 1; 5	LEC; 2; 4	LEC; 3; 5	COA; 1; 6	COA; 2; 1	COA; 3; 5	3rd	207
2024	MP Motorsport	JED; 1; 9	JED; 2; 5	MIA; 1; 5	MIA; 2; 6	CAT; 1; 5	CAT; 2; 3	ZAN; 1; 8	ZAN; 2; 4	SIN; 1; 6	SIN; 2; 6	LSL; 1; 4	LSL; 2 C	YMC; 1; 2	YMC; 2; 3	YMC; 3; 10							5th	133

=== Complete F4 Saudi Arabian Championship results ===
(key) (Races in bold indicate pole position; races in italics indicate fastest lap)

Year	Team	1	2	3	4	5	6	7	8	9	10	11	12	13	14	15	16	17	DC	Points
2024	Altawkilat Meritus.GP	KMT1; 1; 3	KMT1; 2; 2	KMT1; 3; 1	KMT1; 4; 10	LSL; 1; 5	LSL; 2; 7	LSL; 3; 11	LSL; 4; 2	JED1; 1; 5	JED1; 2; 8	JED1; 3; 3	JED2; 1 Ret	JED2; 2; 6	JED2; 3; 10†	JED3; 1 Ret	JED3; 2; 6	JED3; 3; 4	4th	116.5

=== Complete F4 Middle East Championship results ===
(key) (Races in bold indicate pole position; races in italics indicate fastest lap)

Year	Team	1	2	3	4	5	6	7	8	9	10	11	12	13	14	15	DC	Points
2025	AKCEL GP / PHM Racing	YMC1; 1; 20	YMC1; 2 Ret	YMC1; 3 DNS	YMC2; 1	YMC2; 2	YMC2; 3	DUB; 1	DUB; 2	DUB; 3	YMC3; 1	YMC3; 2	YMC3; 3	LUS; 1	LUS; 2	LUS; 3	31st	0

=== Complete Ligier European Series results ===
(key) (Races in bold indicate pole position) (Races in italics indicate the fastest lap)

Year	Entrant	Car	Class	1	2	3	4	5	6	7	8	9	10	11	DC	Points
2025	Team Virage	Ligier JS P4	JS P4	BAR; 1; 7	BAR; 2; 3	LEC; 1; 4	LEC; 2; 4	LMS; 6	SPA; 1; 3	SPA; 2; 4	SIL; 1; 11	**SIL**; **2**; 2	ALG; 1 Ret	ALG; 2; 7	4th	104
