= 2019 Italian F4 Championship =

Racing championship season

The 2019 Italian F4 Championship Powered by Abarth was the sixth season of the Italian F4 Championship. Norwegian driver Dennis Hauger dominated the championship, winning twelve out of the 21 races, helping his team Van Amersfoort Racing to become teams' champions. The rookie championship was won by Mercedes junior Paul Aron, who won two races in the overall championship. Hauger's closest challenger Gianluca Petecof won four races, and Roman Staněk, Joshua Dürksen and Giorgio Carrara won one race each.

== Teams and Drivers ==
Team	No.	Driver	Class	Rounds
(Germany) BWT Mücke Motorsport	2	(Germany) Nico Göhler	R	3–4
(Germany) BWT Mücke Motorsport	25	(Finland) William Alatalo		All
(Germany) BWT Mücke Motorsport	26	(Paraguay) Joshua Dürksen	R	All
(Germany) BWT Mücke Motorsport	99	(Italy) Erwin Zanotti	R	All
(Netherlands) Van Amersfoort Racing	4	(Germany) Niklas Krütten		1–4
(Netherlands) Van Amersfoort Racing	6	(Israel) Ido Cohen		All
(Netherlands) Van Amersfoort Racing	8	(Germany) Lucas Alecco Roy		All
(Netherlands) Van Amersfoort Racing	61	(Germany) Sebastian Estner		5
(Netherlands) Van Amersfoort Racing	62	(Norway) Dennis Hauger		All
(Italy) Prema Powerteam	5	(Brazil) Gianluca Petecof		All
(Italy) Prema Powerteam	7	(Estonia) Paul Aron	R	All
(Italy) Prema Powerteam	10	(Denmark) Oliver Rasmussen		All
(Italy) Prema Powerteam	11	(Venezuela) Alessandro Famularo		All
(Italy) BVM Racing	12	(Romania) Filip Ugran	R	All
(Italy) BVM Racing	31	(Italy) Pietro Delli Guanti	R	2–4
(Italy) BVM Racing	31	(Italy) Marzio Moretti		6
(Italy) Bhai Tech Racing	14	(Italy) Nicola Marinangeli	R	All
(Italy) Bhai Tech Racing	22	(Italy) Umberto Laganella		1–6
(Italy) Bhai Tech Racing	33	(Finland) Jesse Salmenautio		7
(Italy) Bhai Tech Racing	57	(Russia) Michael Belov		All
(Switzerland) Jenzer Motorsport	16	(Argentina) Giorgio Carrara		1–4
(Switzerland) Jenzer Motorsport	16	(Austria) Stefan Fürtbauer	R	7
(Switzerland) Jenzer Motorsport	17	(United Kingdom) Jonny Edgar	R	All
(Switzerland) Jenzer Motorsport	18	(Italy) Emidio Pesce	R	All
(Switzerland) Jenzer Motorsport	21	(Switzerland) Axel Gnos	R	All
(Italy) DRZ Benelli	20	(Russia) Ivan Berets		All
(Italy) DRZ Benelli	33	(Finland) Jesse Salmenautio		1–6
(Italy) DRZ Benelli	45	(Guatemala) Ian Rodríguez		7
(France) R-ace GP	23	(Switzerland) Grégoire Saucy		1, 3–4
(France) R-ace GP	24	(Hungary) László Tóth		1, 3–4
(Slovenia) AS Motorsport	28	(Germany) Sebastian Freymuth	R	All
(Italy) Cram Motorsport	29	(Venezuela) Emilio Cipriani		All
(Italy) Cram Motorsport	38	(Brazil) Zezinho Muggiati	R	7
(Italy) Cram Motorsport	55	(Israel) Roee Meyuhas	R	All
(Italy) Cram Motorsport	84	(Italy) Francesco Simonazzi	R	1–5
(Italy) Cram Motorsport	94	(Sweden) Daniel Vebster	R	All
(Italy) Antonelli Motorsport	36	(Italy) Lorenzo Ferrari	R	1–3, 5–7
(Italy) Antonelli Motorsport	77	(Italy) Andrea Rosso	R	1–3, 5
(Portugal) DR Formula by RP Motorsport	68	(Mexico) Santiago Ramos	R	5–7
(United Arab Emirates) Abu Dhabi Racing by Prema	78	(United Arab Emirates) Hamda Al Qubaisi	W	4, 7
(United Arab Emirates) Abu Dhabi Racing by Prema	88	(United Arab Emirates) Amna Al Qubaisi	W	All
(Italy) DF Corse by Corbetta	81	(Italy) Fabio Venditti		1–3
(Germany) US Racing	97	(Czech Republic) Roman Staněk	R	1, 3–7

Icon	Class
R	Rookie Trophy
W	Woman Trophy

== Race calendar and results ==
The calendar was revealed on 1 December 2018. Adria International Raceway and Circuit Paul Ricard were replaced in the series schedule by circuits in Hungary and Austria, Hungaroring and Red Bull Ring respectively. The cancelled race from Misano World Circuit was rescheduled to run at Autodromo Enzo e Dino Ferrari in Round 5 as a fourth race. Hungaroring round supporting Euroformula Open and Red Bull Ring round supporting International GT Open. Misano World Circuit other all rounds supporting Formula Regional European Championship

Round		Circuit	Date	Pole position	Fastest lap	Winning driver	Winning team	Secondary Class winner
1	R1	(Italy) ACI Vallelunga Circuit	4 May	(Brazil) Gianluca Petecof	(Venezuela) Emilio Cipriani	(Brazil) Gianluca Petecof	(Italy) Prema Powerteam	R: (Czech Republic) Roman Staněk; W: (United Arab Emirates) Amna Al Qubaisi
1	R2	(Italy) ACI Vallelunga Circuit	5 May	(Czech Republic) Roman Staněk	(Israel) Ido Cohen	(Paraguay) Joshua Dürksen (Note: Roman Staněk won the race but was penalised for overtaking under the safety car.)	(Germany) BWT Mücke Motorsport	R: (Paraguay) Joshua Dürksen; W: (United Arab Emirates) Amna Al Qubaisi
1	R3	(Italy) ACI Vallelunga Circuit	5 May	(Germany) Lucas Alecco Roy (Note: Niklas Krütten set the fastest time but was excluded for qualifying infringement.)	(Brazil) Gianluca Petecof	(Brazil) Gianluca Petecof	(Italy) Prema Powerteam	R: (Paraguay) Joshua Dürksen; W: (United Arab Emirates) Amna Al Qubaisi
2	R1	(Italy) Misano World Circuit	18 May	(Brazil) Gianluca Petecof	(Finland) William Alatalo	(Brazil) Gianluca Petecof	(Italy) Prema Powerteam	R: (Estonia) Paul Aron; W: (United Arab Emirates) Amna Al Qubaisi
2	R2	(Italy) Misano World Circuit	19 May	(Estonia) Paul Aron	(Norway) Dennis Hauger	(Norway) Dennis Hauger	(Netherlands) Van Amersfoort Racing	R: (Israel) Roee Meyuhas; W: (United Arab Emirates) Amna Al Qubaisi
2	R3	(Italy) Misano World Circuit	19 May	(Denmark) Oliver Rasmussen	The race was cancelled due to heavy rain			
3	R1	(Hungary) Hungaroring, Mogyoród	6 July	(Norway) Dennis Hauger	(Norway) Dennis Hauger	(Norway) Dennis Hauger	(Netherlands) Van Amersfoort Racing	R: (Estonia) Paul Aron; W: no finishers
3	R2	(Hungary) Hungaroring, Mogyoród	7 July	(Norway) Dennis Hauger	(Norway) Dennis Hauger	(Norway) Dennis Hauger	(Netherlands) Van Amersfoort Racing	R: (Estonia) Paul Aron; W: (United Arab Emirates) Amna Al Qubaisi
3	R3	(Hungary) Hungaroring, Mogyoród	7 July	(Norway) Dennis Hauger	(Norway) Dennis Hauger	(Brazil) Gianluca Petecof	(Italy) Prema Powerteam	R: (Paraguay) Joshua Dürksen; W: (United Arab Emirates) Amna Al Qubaisi
4	R1	(Austria) Red Bull Ring, Spielberg	13 July	(Czech Republic) Roman Staněk	(Argentina) Giorgio Carrara	(Estonia) Paul Aron	(Italy) Prema Powerteam	R: (Estonia) Paul Aron; W: (United Arab Emirates) Amna Al Qubaisi
4	R2	(Austria) Red Bull Ring, Spielberg	14 July	(Germany) Niklas Krütten	(Norway) Dennis Hauger	(Norway) Dennis Hauger	(Netherlands) Van Amersfoort Racing	R: (United Kingdom) Jonny Edgar; W: (United Arab Emirates) Amna Al Qubaisi
4	R3	(Austria) Red Bull Ring, Spielberg	14 July	(Czech Republic) Roman Staněk	(Brazil) Gianluca Petecof	(Argentina) Giorgio Carrara	(Switzerland) Jenzer Motorsport	R: (Estonia) Paul Aron; W: (United Arab Emirates) Amna Al Qubaisi
5	R1	(Italy) Autodromo Enzo e Dino Ferrari	31 August	(Czech Republic) Roman Staněk	(United Kingdom) Jonny Edgar	(Norway) Dennis Hauger	(Netherlands) Van Amersfoort Racing	R: (United Kingdom) Jonny Edgar; W: (United Arab Emirates) Amna Al Qubaisi
5	R2	(Italy) Autodromo Enzo e Dino Ferrari	31 August	(Czech Republic) Roman Staněk	(Czech Republic) Roman Staněk	(Czech Republic) Roman Staněk	(Germany) US Racing	R: (Czech Republic) Roman Staněk; W: (United Arab Emirates) Amna Al Qubaisi
5	R3	(Italy) Autodromo Enzo e Dino Ferrari	1 September	(Czech Republic) Roman Staněk	(Russia) Michael Belov	(Norway) Dennis Hauger	(Netherlands) Van Amersfoort Racing	R: (Czech Republic) Roman Staněk; W: (United Arab Emirates) Amna Al Qubaisi
5	R4	(Italy) Autodromo Enzo e Dino Ferrari	1 September	(Denmark) Oliver Rasmussen	(Norway) Dennis Hauger	(Norway) Dennis Hauger	(Netherlands) Van Amersfoort Racing	R: (Estonia) Paul Aron; W: (United Arab Emirates) Amna Al Qubaisi
6	R1	(Italy) Mugello Circuit	5 October	(Norway) Dennis Hauger	(United Kingdom) Jonny Edgar	(Estonia) Paul Aron	(Italy) Prema Powerteam	R: (Estonia) Paul Aron; W: (United Arab Emirates) Amna Al Qubaisi
6	R2	(Italy) Mugello Circuit	5 October	(Norway) Dennis Hauger	(Norway) Dennis Hauger	(Norway) Dennis Hauger	(Netherlands) Van Amersfoort Racing	R: (Czech Republic) Roman Staněk; W: (United Arab Emirates) Amna Al Qubaisi
6	R3	(Italy) Mugello Circuit	6 October	(Norway) Dennis Hauger	(Norway) Dennis Hauger	(Norway) Dennis Hauger	(Netherlands) Van Amersfoort Racing	R: (Estonia) Paul Aron; W: (United Arab Emirates) Amna Al Qubaisi
7	R1	(Italy) Autodromo Nazionale di Monza	19 October	(Norway) Dennis Hauger	(Norway) Dennis Hauger	(Norway) Dennis Hauger	(Netherlands) Van Amersfoort Racing	R: (Paraguay) Joshua Dürksen; W: (United Arab Emirates) Hamda Al Qubaisi
7	R2	(Italy) Autodromo Nazionale di Monza	20 October	(United Kingdom) Jonny Edgar	(Finland) William Alatalo	(Norway) Dennis Hauger	(Netherlands) Van Amersfoort Racing	R: (Estonia) Paul Aron; W: (United Arab Emirates) Hamda Al Qubaisi
7	R3	(Italy) Autodromo Nazionale di Monza	20 October	(United Kingdom) Jonny Edgar	(Denmark) Oliver Rasmussen	(Norway) Dennis Hauger	(Netherlands) Van Amersfoort Racing	R: (Czech Republic) Roman Staněk; W: (United Arab Emirates) Hamda Al Qubaisi

== Championship standings ==
Points were awarded to the top 10 classified finishers in each race. No points were awarded for pole position or fastest lap. Only the best sixteen results were counted towards the championship.

Position	**1st**	**2nd**	**3rd**	**4th**	**5th**	**6th**	**7th**	**8th**	**9th**	**10th**
Points	25	18	15	12	10	8	6	4	2	1

=== Drivers' standings ===
Pos	Driver	VLL (Italy)			MIS (Italy)			HUN (Hungary)			RBR (Austria)			IMO (Italy)				MUG (Italy)			MNZ (Italy)			Pts
Pos	Driver	R1	R2	R3	R1	R2	R3	R1	R2	R3	R1	R2	R3	R1	R2	R3	R4	R1	R2	R3	R1	R2	R3	Pts
1	(Norway) Dennis Hauger	21	10	11	2	1	C	**1**	**1**	**2**	5	1	2	1	3	1	1	**11**	**1**	**1**	**1**	1	1	369
2	(Brazil) Gianluca Petecof	**1**	5	1	**1**	3	C	2	4	1	11	9	4	Ret	2	14	3	23	6	4	10	5	Ret	233
3	(Estonia) Paul Aron	5	12	Ret	4	**Ret**	C	3	3	26	1	23	3	4	6	4	2	1	4	2	8	3	5	226
4	(Russia) Michael Belov	2	3	28	9	7	C	7	2	18	Ret	11	10	3	4	2	5	5	9	5	2	2	Ret	179
5	(Czech Republic) Roman Staněk	4	**4**	6				19	7	Ret	**Ret**	12	**5**	**25**	**1**	**3**	(Note: An extra race was run at Imola to compensate for Race 3 at Misano being cancelled. The grid for Race 4 at Imola was based on the grid for the aforementioned cancelled Misano race, and drivers who did not participate at Misano were not entered into this extra race.)	7	2	7	26	6	2	144
6	(Israel) Ido Cohen	Ret	2	12	8	5	C	6	11	3	7	6	30	5	7	6	Ret	6	3	11	7	9	6	132
7	(Denmark) Oliver Rasmussen	6	14	7	5	4	**C**	30	6	6	10	Ret	11	Ret	8	11	**4**	4	10	6	3	7	3	126
8	(Paraguay) Joshua Dürksen	Ret	1	3	11	8	C	5	9	4	3	Ret	8	12	17	16	19	24	5	3	5	22	Ret	122
9	(Finland) William Alatalo	8	6	Ret	6	9	C	4	13	5	4	5	6	6	Ret	Ret	14	9	7	8	4	4	22	118
10	(United Kingdom) Jonny Edgar	7	19	Ret	19	10	C	21	5	7	9	7	14	2	5	5	9	3	8	10	Ret	**8**	**9**	97
11	(Germany) Niklas Krütten	27	8	30	3	2	C	Ret	8	10	2	**2**	27											78
12	(Venezuela) Alessandro Famularo	3	Ret	21	7	24	C	20	Ret	9	6	10	7	Ret	9	8	8	8	16	12	9	13	24	54
13	(Argentina) Giorgio Carrara	11	15	8	15	19	C	8	15	11	19	8	1											37
14	(Germany) Lucas Alecco Roy	Ret	16	**2**	14	20	C	9	Ret	12	12	13	28	10	23	23	Ret	Ret	Ret	17	6	12	7	35
15	(Switzerland) Grégoire Saucy	20	Ret	5				31	14	14	8	4	9											28
16	(Russia) Ivan Berets	Ret	Ret	4	18	Ret	C	10	23	13	Ret	15	21	7	11	10	6	22	15	15	15	17	12	28
17	(Italy) Lorenzo Ferrari	14	9	10	29	15	C	Ret	DNS	DNS				17	14	9	23	2	13	9	13	11	Ret	25
18	(Finland) Jesse Salmenautio	10	20	29	20	26	C	11	12	25	15	3	16	14	16	15	12	12	18	18	11	20	8	20
19	(Italy) Umberto Laganella	23	7	14	12	11	C	Ret	10	8	14	Ret	15	Ret	10	7	Ret	Ret	DNS	DNS				18
20	(Israel) Roee Meyuhas	22	21	23	10	6	C	29	16	15	16	Ret	22	16	19	18	7	16	14	24	18	16	11	15
21	(Guatemala) Ian Rodríguez																				16	10	4	13
22	(Italy) Francesco Simonazzi	13	Ret	15	13	14	C	17	30	22	WD	WD	WD	8	12	27	13							4
23	(Switzerland) Axel Gnos	9	22	16	24	22	C	23	25	DNS	18	16	13	22	13	20	10	10	11	27	19	Ret	13	4
24	(Germany) Sebastian Estner													9	Ret	13								2
25	(Italy) Andrea Rosso	18	Ret	9	25	23	C	22	31	Ret				19	24	Ret	16							2
26	(Romania) Filip Ugran	26	18	18	16	27	C	24	18	17	27	18	18	13	26	17	11	Ret	21	22	12	18	10	1
27	(Sweden) Daniel Vebster	12	11	13	17	12	C	12	17	20	13	21	12	11	15	12	24	14	17	23	17	14	DNS	0
28	(Italy) Marzio Moretti																	15	12	14				0
29	(Italy) Nicola Marinangeli	16	13	27	22	29	C	14	Ret	19	24	24	Ret	15	27	21	17	Ret	25	13	14	27	20	0
30	(Venezuela) Emilio Cipriani	25	23	20	21	13	C	13	27	Ret	25	Ret	31	24	18	25	21	18	20	25	22	19	23	0
31	(United Arab Emirates) Amna Al Qubaisi	19	27	22	26	17	C	Ret	21	29	22	17	23	18	25	26	15	13	26	16	28	28	Ret	0
32	(Italy) Emidio Pesce	15	26	19	27	25	C	28	22	16	26	Ret	25	20	20	22	18	17	19	21	21	25	14	0
33	(Germany) Nico Göhler							16	19	23	21	14	24											0
34	(Italy) Erwin Zanotti	24	Ret	24	30	28	C	25	24	27	20	Ret	29	21	21	19	20	21	22	19	20	15	15	0
35	(Italy) Pietro Delli Guanti				28	21	C	15	20	24	17	19	17											0
36	(Germany) Sebastian Freymuth	17	17	17	23	16	C	26	28	21	23	20	20	23	Ret	24	22	19	24	20	Ret	21	16	0
37	(Austria) Stefan Fürtbauer																				23	24	17	0
38	(Hungary) László Tóth	Ret	24	25				18	26	28	Ret	Ret	19											0
39	(Brazil) Zezinho Muggiati																				27	23	18	0
40	(Italy) Fabio Venditti	Ret	25	26	Ret	18	C	27	29	30														0
41	(Mexico) Santiago Ramos													Ret	22	28		20	23	26	24	29	19	0
42	(United Arab Emirates) Hamda Al Qubaisi										28	22	26								25	26	21	0
Pos	Driver	R1	R2	R3	R1	R2	R3	R1	R2	R3	R1	R2	R3	R1	R2	R3	R4	R1	R2	R3	R1	R2	R3	Pts
Pos	Driver	VLL (Italy)			MIS (Italy)			HUN (Hungary)			RBR (Austria)			IMO (Italy)				MUG (Italy)			MNZ (Italy)			Pts

Colour	Result
Gold	Winner
Silver	Second place
Bronze	Third place
Green	Points classification
Blue	Non-points classification
Blue	Non-classified finish (NC)
Purple	Retired, not classified (Ret)
Red	Did not qualify (DNQ)
Red	Did not pre-qualify (DNPQ)
Black	Disqualified (DSQ)
White	Did not start (DNS)
White	Withdrew (WD)
White	Race cancelled (C)
Blank	Did not practice (DNP)
Blank	Did not arrive (DNA)
Blank	Excluded (EX)

**Bold** – Pole
Italics – Fastest Lap

=== Secondary Classes' standings ===
Pos	Driver	VLL (Italy)			MIS (Italy)			HUN (Hungary)			RBR (Austria)			IMO (Italy)				MUG (Italy)			MNZ (Italy)			Pts
Pos	Driver	R1	R2	R3	R1	R2	R3	R1	R2	R3	R1	R2	R3	R1	R2	R3	R4	R1	R2	R3	R1	R2	R3	Pts
Rookies' championship
1	(Estonia) Paul Aron	2	5	Ret	1	Ret	C	1	1	12	1	9	1	2	3	2	1	1	2	1	2	1	2	348
2	(Czech Republic) Roman Staněk	1	2	2				8	3	Ret	Ret	2	2	15	1	1		4	1	3	13	2	1	261
3	(United Kingdom) Jonny Edgar	3	9	Ret	7	3	C	9	2	2	3	1	6	1	2	3	3	3	4	5	Ret	3	3	254
4	(Paraguay) Joshua Dürksen	Ret	1	1	3	2	C	2	4	1	2	Ret	3	5	8	6	10	12	3	2	1	10	Ret	252
5	(Sweden) Daniel Vebster	5	4	5	6	4	C	3	6	8	4	7	4	4	7	5	14	6	8	11	6	5	DNS	159
6	(Israel) Roee Meyuhas	12	10	11	2	1	C	16	5	3	5	Ret	10	8	9	8	2	7	7	12	7	7	5	142
7	(Italy) Lorenzo Ferrari	7	3	4	14	6	C	Ret	DNS	DNS				9	6	4	13	2	6	4	4	4	Ret	125
8	(Switzerland) Axel Gnos	4	11	7	10	9	C	11	12	DNS	7	4	5	13	5	10	4	5	5	14	8	Ret	6	104
9	(Romania) Filip Ugran	14	8	9	5	12	C	12	7	5	13	5	8	6	14	7	5	Ret	10	10	3	8	4	103
10	(Italy) Francesco Simonazzi	6	Ret	6	4	5	C	7	14	9	WD	WD	WD	3	4	14	6							81
11	(Italy) Nicola Marinangeli	9	6	13	8	14	C	4	Ret	6	11	10	Ret	7	15	11	8	Ret	14	6	5	14	13	63
12	(Germany) Sebastian Freymuth	10	7	8	9	7	C	14	13	8	10	7	9	14	Ret	13	12	9	13	8	Ret	9	9	42
13	(Italy) Pietro Delli Guanti				13	8	C	5	9	11	6	6	7											38
14	(Italy) Emidio Pesce	8	12	10	12	11	C	15	10	4	12	Ret	12	11	10	12	9	8	9	9	10	13	7	36
15	(Germany) Nico Göhler							6	8	10	9	3	11											30
16	(Italy) Erwin Zanotti	13	Ret	12	15	13	C	13	11	13	8	Ret	13	12	11	9	11	11	11	7	9	6	8	26
17	(Italy) Andrea Rosso	11	Ret	3	11	10	C	10	15	Ret				10	13	Ret	7							24
18	(Austria) Stefan Fürtbauer																				11	12	10	1
19	(Mexico) Santiago Ramos													Ret	12	15		10	12	13	12	15	12	1
20	(Brazil) Zezinho Muggiati																				14	11	11	0
Women's championship
1	(United Arab Emirates) Amna Al Qubaisi	1	1	1	1	1	C	Ret	1	1	1	1	1	1	1	1	1	1	1	1	2	2	Ret	400
2	(United Arab Emirates) Hamda Al Qubaisi										2	2	2								1	1	1	129
Pos	Driver	R1	R2	R3	R1	R2	R3	R1	R2	R3	R1	R2	R3	R1	R2	R3	R4	R1	R2	R3	R1	R2	R3	Pts
Pos	Driver	VLL (Italy)			MIS (Italy)			HUN (Hungary)			RBR (Austria)			IMO (Italy)				MUG (Italy)			MNZ (Italy)			Pts

=== Teams' championship ===
Pos	Team	Points
1	(Netherlands) Van Amersfoort Racing	576
2	(Italy) Prema Powerteam	548
3	(Germany) BWT Mücke Motorsport	234
4	(Italy) Bhai Tech Racing	199
5	(Germany) US Racing	144
6	(Switzerland) Jenzer Motorsport	136
7	(Italy) DRZ Benelli	56
8	(France) R-ace GP	28
9	(Italy) Antonelli Motorsport	26
10	(Italy) Cram Motorsport	19
11	(Italy) BVM Racing	1
