= Amna Al Qubaisi =

Emirati female racing driver

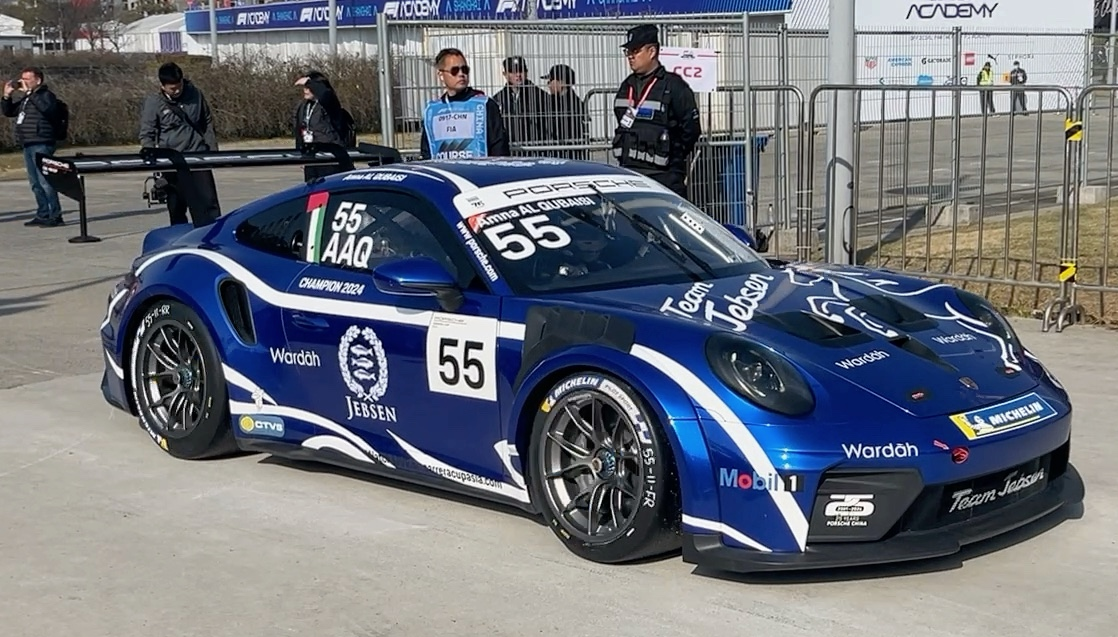
- Al Qubaisi driving at Shanghai during the 2026 Porsche Carrera Cup Asia season
- Nationality: (United Arab Emirates) Emirati
- Born: 28 March 2000 (age 26) Washington, Virginia, United States
- Relatives: Khaled Al Qubaisi (father); Hamda Al Qubaisi (sister)

Ligier European Series career
- Debut season: 2025
- Current team: Team Virage
- Categorisation: FIA Silver
- Car number: 88
- Starts: 11 (11 entries)
- Wins: 0
- Podiums: 3
- Poles: 1
- Fastest laps: 1
- Best finish: 4th in 2025

Previous series
- 2023–2024; 2024; 2022; 2021; 2018–2019: F1 Academy; F4 Saudi Arabian; FR Asian; F3 Asian; Italian F4

Championship titles
- 2019: Italian F4 Woman Trophy

Amna Al Qubaisi (Arabic: آمنة القبيسي; born 28 March 2000) is an Emirati racing driver who currently competes in the Porsche Carrera Cup Asia, the first female to do so. Al Qubaisi previously competed in the all-female F1 Academy championship, joining the Red Bull Academy Programme to represent RB Formula One Team. Amna also recently competed in the 2025 Ligier European Series with Team Virage in the No. 88 entry alongside her sister Hamda. On 16 December 2018, she became the first Middle Eastern woman to take part in a motorsport test program for Formula E after the Diriyah ePrix in Saudi Arabia.

In 2026, Al Qubaisi was named in the inaugural TIME100 Sport list, honouring the most influential people in global sport.

== Early and personal life ==
Al Qubaisi was born in Abu Dhabi to Khaled Al Qubaisi, former CEO of Real Estate and Infrastructure Investment at Mubadala Investment Company and the first Emirati to compete at the 24 Hours of Le Mans race, claiming two class podiums. She competed in karting for Daman Speed Academy.

Al Qubaisi attended Sorbonne University Abu Dhabi, completing a degree in Records Management and Archival Science and her interests include karting, gymnastics and jet skiing. She is married to sports executive Matt Parker.

== Career ==
=== Karting ===
Al Qubaisi began her karting career in 2014 at the age of fourteen. She was the first Arab woman to participate at the Rotax Max Challenge (RMC) World Finals. Two years later she began competing internationally, claiming multiple top-ten finishes. In 2017, she was the first Arab girl to win the UAE RMC Championship. She was also the first female to be sponsored by Kaspersky Lab, and to be selected by the ATCUAE to represent the UAE at the GCC Young Drivers Academy Programme, which she won.

==== X30 Euro Series Wackersdorf ====
Al Qubaisi and her sister Hamda participated at the X30 Euro Series in Wackersdorf with Team Driver. It was Al Qubaisi's first time driving in Wackersdorf, but she showed great pace, finishing amongst the top-five in one of her heats. She finished 16th overall out of 54 drivers, and was the only female to reach the Final.

=== Formula 4 ===
Al Qubaisi competed in the 2018 Italian F4 Championship with the championship winning Prema Powerteam. She competed in six of the seven rounds, with her highest place finish in a race being 12th. She also took part the following season, finishing 31st with no points.

=== Formula E test ===
Al Qubaisi was one of nine female drivers to take part in a test session on 16 December 2018, after the first round of the 2018-19 Formula E Season at the Ad Diriyah ePrix on a street circuit in Diriyah, Saudi Arabia. She drove for Envision Virgin Racing in an Audi-powered Formula E car in an initiative by the FIA Women in Motorsport Commission. It came less than six months after women were legally allowed to drive in Saudi Arabia for the first time.

=== Formula Regional ===
Al Qubaisi took the place of her sister Hamda for the Barcelona round with Prema Racing, in the 2022 Formula Regional European Championship.

=== F1 Academy ===
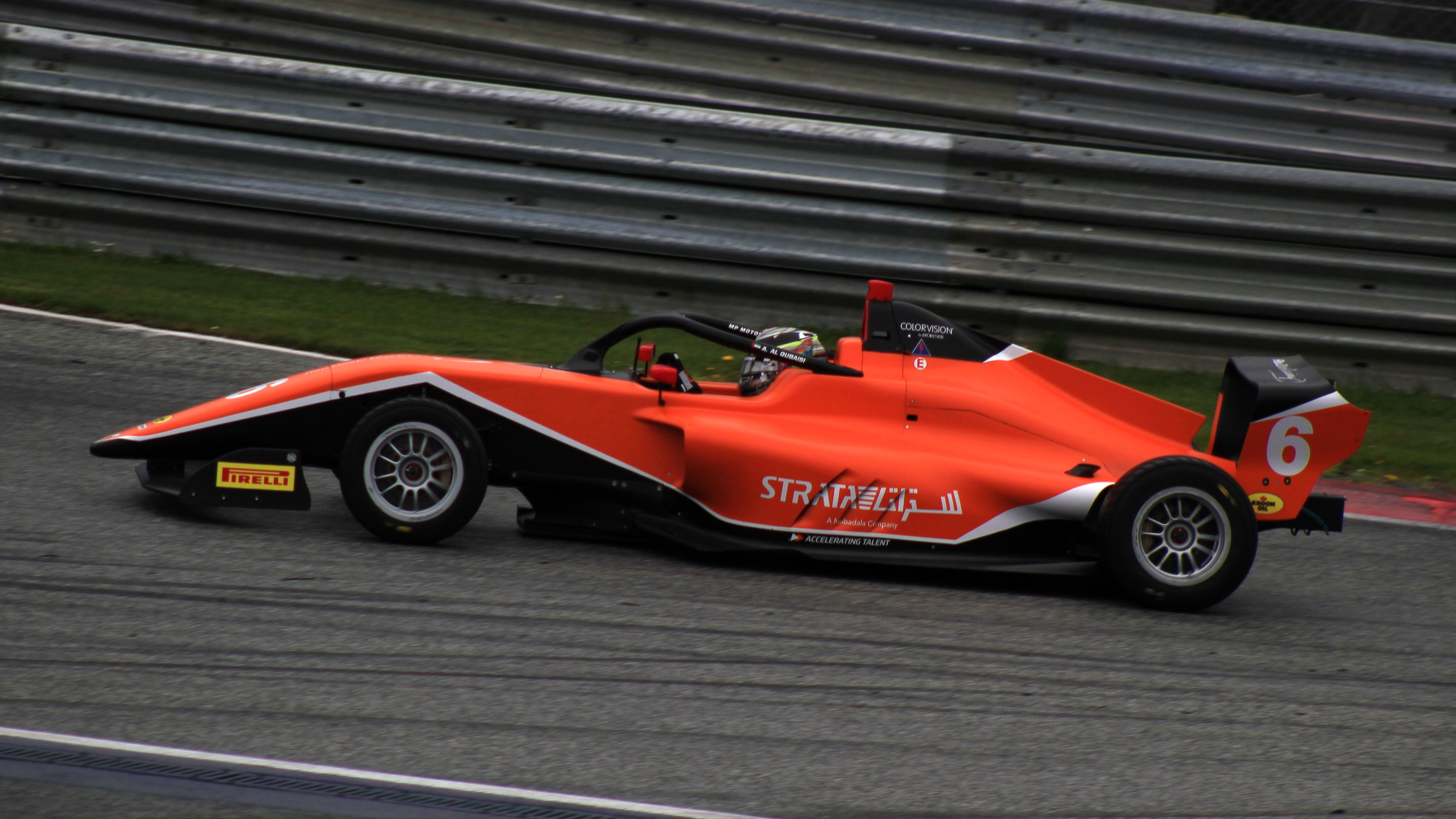
Al Qubaisi driving for MP Motorsport at the Red Bull Ring during the 2023 F1 Academy season.

In 2023, Al Qubaisi signed with MP Motorsport in the newly launched all-female F1 Academy championship. She ended the season with two wins and placed sixth. For 2024, she re-signed with MP and joined the Red Bull Academy Programme to represent RB Formula One Team. She finished the season placing 15th.

=== Porsche Carrera Cup ===
In 2026, Al Qubaisi signed with Team Jebsen to participate in the Porsche Carrera Cup Asia, the first female to do so.

== Karting record ==
=== Karting career summary ===
Season	Series	Team	Position
2015	Rotax Max Challenge Grand Finals — Junior	Al Ain Raceway	68th
2016	CIK-FIA Karting Academy Trophy		46th
2017	Rotax Max Challenge Grand Finals — Senior	Al Ain Raceway	63rd

== Racing record ==
=== Racing career summary ===
Season	Series	Team	Races	Wins	Poles	F/Laps	Podiums	Points	Position
2016–17	Formula 4 UAE Championship	Abu Dhabi Racing	0	0	0	0	0	0	NC
2018	Italian F4 Championship	Prema Theodore Racing	18	0	0	0	0	0	34th
2018–19	Formula E	Envision Virgin Racing	Test driver						
2019	Italian F4 Championship	Abu Dhabi Racing by Prema	21	0	0	0	0	0	31st
2019	Formula 4 UAE Championship - Trophy Round	Abu Dhabi Racing	2	1	1	0	1	N/A	NC
2021	F3 Asian Championship	Abu Dhabi Racing by Prema	15	0	0	0	0	0	24th
2022	Formula Regional Asian Championship	Abu Dhabi Racing by Prema	14	0	0	0	0	1	26th
2022	Formula Regional European Championship	Prema Racing	4	0	0	0	0	0	NC†
2023	Formula Winter Series	GRS Team	2	0	0	0	0	0	NC
2023	F1 Academy	MP Motorsport	21	2	0	2	4	117	6th
2023	Formula 4 UAE Championship - Trophy Round	MP Motorsport	2	0	0	0	0	N/A	NC
2023	F4 Saudi Arabian Championship - Trophy Event	Altawkilat Meritus.GP	4	0	0	0	1	N/A	NC
2024	F4 Saudi Arabian Championship	Altawkilat Meritus.GP	17	0	0	1	1	56.5	10th
2024	F1 Academy	MP Motorsport	14	0	0	0	0	16	15th
2025	Ligier European Series - JS P4	Team Virage	11	0	1	1	3	104	4th
2025–26	24H Series Middle East - GTX	Rossa Racing	1	0	0	0	0	0	NC
2026	Porsche Carrera Cup Asia - Pro	Team Jebsen	13	0	0	0	0	60	12th

† As she was a guest driver, Al Qubaisi was ineligible to score points.

=== Complete Italian F4 Championship results ===
(key) (Races in bold indicate pole position) (Races in italics indicate fastest lap)

Year	Team	1	2	3	4	5	6	7	8	9	10	11	12	13	14	15	16	17	18	19	20	21	22	Pos	Points
2018	Prema Theodore Racing	ADR; 1 Ret	ADR; 2; 12	ADR; 3; 16	LEC; 1	LEC; 2	LEC; 3	MNZ; 1; 24	MNZ; 2; 16	MNZ; 3; 17	MIS; 1; 20	MIS; 2; 23	MIS; 3 Ret	IMO; 1; 20	IMO; 2; 20	IMO; 3; 23	VLL; 1 Ret	VLL; 2; 16	VLL; 3; 15	MUG; 1; 19	MUG; 2; 21	MUG; 3; 21		34th	0
2019	Abu Dhabi Racing by Prema	VLL; 1; 19	VLL; 2; 27	VLL; 3; 22	MIS; 1; 26	MIS; 2; 17	MIS; 3 C	HUN; 1 Ret	HUN; 2; 21	HUN; 3; 29	RBR; 1; 22	RBR; 2; 17	RBR; 3; 23	IMO; 1; 18	IMO; 2; 25	IMO; 3; 26	IMO; 4; 15	MUG; 1; 13	MUG; 2; 26	MUG; 3; 16	MNZ; 1; 28	MNZ; 2; 28	MNZ; 3 Ret	31st	0

=== Complete Formula Regional Asian Championship results ===
(key) (Races in bold indicate pole position) (Races in italics indicate the fastest lap of top ten finishers)

Year	Entrant	1	2	3	4	5	6	7	8	9	10	11	12	13	14	15	DC	Points
2021	Abu Dhabi Racing by Prema	DUB; 1; 16	DUB; 2 Ret	DUB; 3; 18	ABU; 1; 17	ABU; 2; 17	ABU; 3; 16	ABU; 1; 15	ABU; 2; 14	ABU; 3 Ret	DUB; 1; 18	DUB; 2 Ret	DUB; 3 Ret	ABU; 1; 16	ABU; 2; 18	ABU; 3; 15	24th	0
2022	Abu Dhabi Racing by Prema	ABU; 1; 14	ABU; 2; 10	ABU; 3 Ret	DUB; 1 Ret	DUB; 2; 19	DUB; 3; 17	DUB; 1; 21	DUB; 2; 21	DUB; 3 DNS	DUB; 1; 20	DUB; 2; 20	DUB; 3; 20	ABU; 1 Ret	ABU; 2; 18	ABU; 3 Ret	26th	1

=== Complete Formula Regional European Championship results ===
(key) (Races in bold indicate pole position) (Races in italics indicate fastest lap)

Year	Team	1	2	3	4	5	6	7	8	9	10	11	12	13	14	15	16	17	18	19	20	DC	Points
2022	Prema Racing	MNZ; 1	MNZ; 2	IMO; 1	IMO; 2	MCO; 1	MCO; 2	LEC; 1	LEC; 2	ZAN; 1	ZAN; 2	HUN; 1	HUN; 2	SPA; 1	SPA; 2	RBR; 1	RBR; 2	CAT; 1 Ret	CAT; 2; 31	MUG; 1 Ret	MUG; 2 Ret	NC†	0

† As Amna was a guest driver, she was ineligible to score points.

=== Complete Formula Winter Series results ===
(key) (Races in bold indicate pole position; races in italics indicate fastest lap)

Year	Team	1	2	3	4	5	6	7	8	DC	Points
2023	GRS Team	JER; 1	JER; 2	CRT; 1	CRT; 2	NAV; 1	NAV; 2	CAT; 2 Ret	CAT; 2 DSQ	NC	0

=== Complete F4 Saudi Arabian Championship results ===
(key) (Races in bold indicate pole position; races in italics indicate fastest lap)

Year	Team	1	2	3	4	5	6	7	8	9	10	11	12	13	14	15	16	17	DC	Points
2024	Altawkilat Meritus.GP	KMT1; 1; 9	KMT1; 2; 8	KMT1; 3; 8	KMT1; 4 Ret	LSL; 1; 10	LSL; 2; 2	LSL; 3; 5	LSL; 4; 10	JED1; 1 Ret	JED1; 2; 4	JED1; 3; 9	JED2; 1; 7	JED2; 2 Ret	JED2; 3; 4	JED3; 1 Ret	JED3; 2; 10†	JED3; 3; 6	10th	56.5

=== Complete F1 Academy results ===
(key) (Races in bold indicate pole position; races in italics indicate fastest lap)

Year	Team	1	2	3	4	5	6	7	8	9	10	11	12	13	14	15	16	17	18	19	20	21	DC	Points
2023	MP Motorsport	RBR; 1; 8	RBR; 2; 1	RBR; 1; 3	CRT; 1; 7	CRT; 2; 4	CRT; 3; 6	CAT; 1; 5	CAT; 2; 1	CAT; 3; 9	ZAN; 1; 8	ZAN; 2 Ret	ZAN; 3; 9	MNZ; 1; 9	MNZ; 2; 7	MNZ; 3; 4	LEC; 1; 7	LEC; 2; 3	LEC; 3; 7	COA; 1; 8	COA; 2; 14	COA; 3; 10	6th	117
2024	MP Motorsport	JED; 1; 13	JED; 2; 8	MIA; 1; 8	MIA; 2; 8	CAT; 1 Ret	CAT; 2; 12	ZAN; 1; 16	ZAN; 2; 14	SIN; 1; 12	SIN; 2; 11	LSL; 1; 13	LSL; 2 C	YMC; 1; 8	YMC; 2; 13	YMC; 3; 13							15th	16

=== Complete Ligier European Series results ===
(key) (Races in bold indicate pole position) (Races in italics indicate the fastest lap)

Year	Entrant	Car	Class	1	2	3	4	5	6	7	8	9	10	11	DC	Points
2025	Team Virage	Ligier JS P4	JS P4	BAR; 1; 7	BAR; 2; 3	LEC; 1; 4	LEC; 2; 4	LMS; 6	SPA; 1; 3	SPA; 2; 4	SIL; 1; 11	**SIL**; **2**; 2	ALG; 1 Ret	ALG; 2; 7	4th	104

=== Complete Porsche Carrera Cup Asia results ===
(key) (Races in bold indicate pole position; races in italics indicate points for the fastest lap of top ten finishers)

Year	Entrant	Class	1	2	3	4	5	6	7	8	9	10	11	12	13	DC	Points
2026	Team Jebsen	Pro	SHA; 1; 22	SHA; 2; 14	ZHU; 1; 14	ZHU; 2; 9	FUJ; 1; 9	FUJ; 2; 10	BAN; 1; 10	BAN; 2; 9	SEP; 1; 23	SEP; 2; 12	SEP; 3; 16	MRN; 1; 16	MRN; 2; 22	12th	60
