= 2020 Formula 4 UAE Championship =

Motor racing competition

Seasons
- ← 2019 2021 →

The 2020 Formula 4 UAE Championship was the fourth season of the Formula 4 UAE Championship, a motor racing series for the United Arab Emirates regulated according to FIA Formula 4 regulations, and organised and promoted by the Automobile & Touring Club of the UAE (ATCUAE) and AUH Motorsports.

It began with a non-championship round on 28 November 2019 at the Yas Marina Circuit, and finished on 7 March 2020.

== Teams and drivers ==
Team	No.	Drivers	Class	Rounds
(Germany) BWT Mücke Motorsport	2	(Germany) Nico Göhler		TR, All
(Germany) BWT Mücke Motorsport	3	(Italy) Erwin Zanotti		2
(Germany) BWT Mücke Motorsport	4	(Czech Republic) Josef Knopp	R	3–5
(Germany) BWT Mücke Motorsport	21	(Russia) Artem Lobanenko		5
(Germany) BWT Mücke Motorsport	23	(Mexico) Erick Zúñiga	R	All
(United Arab Emirates) Xcel Motorsport	4	(Portugal) Rodrigo Almeida (Note: Almeida is a driver from Mozambique racing under a Portuguese licence.)	R	TR
(United Arab Emirates) Xcel Motorsport	6	(Portugal) Zdeněk Chovanec (Note: Chovanec is a Czech-Venezuelan-Portuguese driver racing under a Portuguese licence.)	R	All
(United Arab Emirates) Xcel Motorsport	7	(Spain) Lorenzo Fluxá	R	All
(United Arab Emirates) Xcel Motorsport	8	(Iran) Mehrbod Shameli	R	TR, 1–4
(United Arab Emirates) Xcel Motorsport	11	(United Kingdom) Dexter Patterson	R	1
(United Arab Emirates) Xcel Motorsport	13	(Netherlands) Tijmen van der Helm		TR
(United Arab Emirates) Xcel Motorsport	14	(Italy) Nicola Marinangeli		TR, All
(United Arab Emirates) Xcel Motorsport	23	(Ukraine) Ivan Peklin	R	TR
(United Arab Emirates) Xcel Motorsport	27	(United Kingdom) Alex Connor		TR
(United Arab Emirates) Xcel Motorsport	51	(Italy) Francesco Pizzi	R	All
(United Arab Emirates) Dream Racing	9	(United Kingdom) Logan Hannah		TR
(United Arab Emirates) Dream Racing	10	(United Arab Emirates) Abdulrahman Al Bloushi	R	All
(United Arab Emirates) Dragon Racing	18	(Saudi Arabia) Reema Juffali		TR, All
(United Arab Emirates) Dragon Racing	99	(Jordan) Manaf Hijjawi	R	TR
(United Arab Emirates) 3Y Technology/ Brand Racing	44	(France) Isack Hadjar		3, 5
(United Arab Emirates) 3Y Technology/ Brand Racing	52	(Austria) Constantin Reisch	R	TR, 1–2, 4
(United Arab Emirates) Abu Dhabi Racing	77	(United Arab Emirates) Hamda Al Qubaisi		TR
(United Arab Emirates) Abu Dhabi Racing	88	(United Arab Emirates) Hamda Al Qubaisi		All
(United Arab Emirates) Abu Dhabi Racing	88	(United Arab Emirates) Amna Al Qubaisi		TR

== Race calendar ==
The schedule consisted of 20 races over 5 rounds. Prior to start of the season a non-championship Trophy Round was held in support of the 2019 Abu Dhabi Grand Prix. All rounds were held in the United Arab Emirates.

The series was run as a winter series per FIA regulations, allowing drivers to participate in the UAE Championship and a European F4 series, both earning points towards an FIA Super Licence, as the end of this season was before the primary European F4 series were to begin their 2020 seasons. However, the championship would not award Super Licence points as not enough drivers were entered in the final round of the championship to meet the required threshold.

Round		Circuit	Date	Pole position	Fastest lap	Winning driver	Winning team	Supporting
2019
TR	R1	Yas Marina Circuit, Abu Dhabi (Grand Prix Circuit)	30 November	(United Arab Emirates) Amna Al Qubaisi	(Italy) Nicola Marinangeli	(United Arab Emirates) Amna Al Qubaisi	(United Arab Emirates) Abu Dhabi Racing	Formula One
TR	R2	Yas Marina Circuit, Abu Dhabi (Grand Prix Circuit)	1 December		(Netherlands) Tijmen van der Helm	(United Kingdom) Alex Connor	(United Arab Emirates) Xcel Motorsport	Formula One
2020
1	R1	Dubai Autodrome, Dubai (Grand Prix Circuit)	9 January	(United Arab Emirates) Hamda Al Qubaisi	(Italy) Francesco Pizzi	(Italy) Francesco Pizzi	(United Arab Emirates) Xcel Motorsport	Dubai 24 Hour; F3 Asian Championship
1	R2	Dubai Autodrome, Dubai (Grand Prix Circuit)	9 January		(Spain) Lorenzo Fluxá	(Italy) Francesco Pizzi	(United Arab Emirates) Xcel Motorsport	Dubai 24 Hour; F3 Asian Championship
1	R3	Dubai Autodrome, Dubai (Grand Prix Circuit)	10 January	(United Arab Emirates) Hamda Al Qubaisi	(Italy) Francesco Pizzi	(Italy) Francesco Pizzi	(United Arab Emirates) Xcel Motorsport	Dubai 24 Hour; F3 Asian Championship
1	R4	Dubai Autodrome, Dubai (Grand Prix Circuit)	10 January	Race cancelled due to heavy rain				Dubai 24 Hour; F3 Asian Championship
2	R1	Yas Marina Circuit, Abu Dhabi (Grand Prix Circuit)	17 January	(United Arab Emirates) Hamda Al Qubaisi	(United Arab Emirates) Hamda Al Qubaisi	(Italy) Francesco Pizzi	(United Arab Emirates) Xcel Motorsport	F3 Asian Championship
2	R2	Yas Marina Circuit, Abu Dhabi (Grand Prix Circuit)	18 January		(United Arab Emirates) Hamda Al Qubaisi	(Mexico) Erick Zúñiga (Note: Francesco Pizzi originally won the race, but received a 10-second time penalty for exceeding track limits.)	(Germany) BWT Mücke Motorsport	F3 Asian Championship
2	R3	Yas Marina Circuit, Abu Dhabi (Grand Prix Circuit)	18 January	(United Arab Emirates) Hamda Al Qubaisi	(Italy) Francesco Pizzi	(Italy) Francesco Pizzi	(United Arab Emirates) Xcel Motorsport	F3 Asian Championship
2	R4	Yas Marina Circuit, Abu Dhabi (Grand Prix Circuit)	18 January		(United Arab Emirates) Hamda Al Qubaisi	(Germany) Nico Göhler	(Germany) BWT Mücke Motorsport	F3 Asian Championship
3	R1	Yas Marina Circuit, Abu Dhabi (North Circuit)	14 February	(United Arab Emirates) Hamda Al Qubaisi	(United Arab Emirates) Hamda Al Qubaisi	(Germany) Nico Göhler	(Germany) BWT Mücke Motorsport	Yas Racing Series
3	R2	Yas Marina Circuit, Abu Dhabi (North Circuit)	15 February		(Italy) Nicola Marinangeli	(Italy) Nicola Marinangeli	(United Arab Emirates) Xcel Motorsport	Yas Racing Series
3	R3	Yas Marina Circuit, Abu Dhabi (North Circuit)	15 February	(United Arab Emirates) Hamda Al Qubaisi	(United Arab Emirates) Hamda Al Qubaisi	(United Arab Emirates) Hamda Al Qubaisi	(United Arab Emirates) Abu Dhabi Racing	Yas Racing Series
3	R4	Yas Marina Circuit, Abu Dhabi (North Circuit)	15 February		(Germany) Nico Göhler	(Italy) Francesco Pizzi	(United Arab Emirates) Xcel Motorsport	Yas Racing Series
4	R1	Dubai Autodrome, Dubai (International Circuit)	21 February	(Italy) Francesco Pizzi	(Spain) Lorenzo Fluxá	(Spain) Lorenzo Fluxá	(United Arab Emirates) Xcel Motorsport	UAE National Race Days
4	R2	Dubai Autodrome, Dubai (International Circuit)	21 February		(Italy) Francesco Pizzi	(Italy) Francesco Pizzi	(United Arab Emirates) Xcel Motorsport	UAE National Race Days
4	R3	Dubai Autodrome, Dubai (International Circuit)	22 February	(Italy) Francesco Pizzi	(Italy) Francesco Pizzi	(Italy) Francesco Pizzi	(United Arab Emirates) Xcel Motorsport	UAE National Race Days
4	R4	Dubai Autodrome, Dubai (International Circuit)	22 February		(Czech Republic) Josef Knopp	(Germany) Nico Göhler	(Germany) BWT Mücke Motorsport	UAE National Race Days
5	R1	Dubai Autodrome, Dubai (Grand Prix Circuit)	6 March	(United Arab Emirates) Hamda Al Qubaisi	(United Arab Emirates) Hamda Al Qubaisi	(United Arab Emirates) Hamda Al Qubaisi	(United Arab Emirates) Abu Dhabi Racing	UAE National Race Days
5	R2	Dubai Autodrome, Dubai (Grand Prix Circuit)	7 March		(Russia) Artem Lobanenko	(Germany) Nico Göhler	(Germany) BWT Mücke Motorsport	UAE National Race Days
5	R3	Dubai Autodrome, Dubai (Grand Prix Circuit)	7 March	(Italy) Francesco Pizzi	(Spain) Lorenzo Fluxá	(Spain) Lorenzo Fluxá	(United Arab Emirates) Xcel Motorsport	UAE National Race Days
5	R4	Dubai Autodrome, Dubai (Grand Prix Circuit)	7 March		(Russia) Artem Lobanenko	(United Arab Emirates) Hamda Al Qubaisi	(United Arab Emirates) Abu Dhabi Racing	UAE National Race Days

== Championship standings ==
Points were awarded to the top 10 classified finishers in each race.

Position	**1st**	**2nd**	**3rd**	**4th**	**5th**	**6th**	**7th**	**8th**	**9th**	**10th**
Points	25	18	15	12	10	8	6	4	2	1

=== Drivers' Championship ===
Pos	Driver	YMC TR		DUB1				YMC1				YMC2				DUB2				DUB3				Pts
Pos	Driver	YMC TR		R1	R2	R3	R4	R1	R2	R3	R4	R1	R2	R3	R4	R1	R2	R3	R4	R1	R2	R3	R4	Pts
1	(Italy) Francesco Pizzi **R**			1	1	1	C	1	4	1	11†	Ret	5	2	1	**4**	1	**1**	6	4	5	**2**	Ret	300
2	(Spain) Lorenzo Fluxá **R**			2	5	3	C	4	DSQ	7	3	3	4	3	4	1	4	2	5	2	2	1	2	274
3	(Germany) Nico Göhler	6	4	5	8	4	C	3	2	4	1	1	6	4	3	2	Ret	4	1	3	1	3	8	270
4	(United Arab Emirates) Hamda Al Qubaisi	5	11	**6**	2	**Ret**	C	**7**	10	**2**	2	**2**	2	**1**	10†	3	3	3	2	**1**	7	6	1	258
5	(Italy) Nicola Marinangeli	2	Ret	3	3	2	C	2	5	3	Ret	4	1	Ret	2	5	2	9	3	10	Ret	5	Ret	202
6	(Mexico) Erick Zúñiga **R**			8	7	8	C	6	1	10	5	6	3	6	9†	9	6	8	4	8	8	7	4	143
7	(Portugal) Zdeněk Chovanec **R**			7	6	Ret	C	5	3	5	4	5	7	7	Ret	10	8	6	Ret	11	10	10	3	113
8	(Saudi Arabia) Reema Juffali	12	6	9	Ret	5	C	8	6	9	6	8	8	8	Ret	8	5	7	Ret	9	9	8	7	80
9	(Czech Republic) Josef Knopp **R**											10	Ret	9	6	6	Ret	5	8	6	4	9	5	65
10	(Iran) Mehrbod Shameli **R**	9	8	10	9	7	C	9	7	8	7	9	9	10	7	7	7	10	7					57
11	(France) Isack Hadjar											7	Ret	5	5					5	6	4	Ret	56
12	(United Kingdom) Dexter Patterson **R**			4	4	6	C																	32
13	(Russia) Artem Lobanenko																			7	3	11	6	29
14	(Italy) Erwin Zanotti							Ret	8	6	10													13
15	(Austria) Constantin Reisch **R**	10	10	DNS	10	9	C	Ret	9	11	8					11	9	11	Ret					11
16	(United Arab Emirates) Abdulrahman Al Bloushi **R**			11	11	DNS	C	10	Ret	12	9	11	10	11	8	12	10	12	9	DNS	DNS	DNS	DNS	11
Trophy Round-only drivers
	(United Kingdom) Alex Connor	3	1																					
	(United Arab Emirates) Amna Al Qubaisi	**1**	Ret																					
	(Jordan) Manaf Hijjawi **R**	4	2																					
	(Netherlands) Tijmen van der Helm	11†	3																					
	(Portugal) Rodrigo Almeida **R**	7	5																					
	(Ukraine) Ivan Peklin **R**	DNS	7																					
	(United Kingdom) Logan Hannah	8	9																					
Pos	Driver	YMC TR		R1	R2	R3	R4	R1	R2	R3	R4	R1	R2	R3	R4	R1	R2	R3	R4	R1	R2	R3	R4	Pts
Pos	Driver	YMC TR		DUB1				YMC1				YMC2				DUB2				DUB3				Pts

Colour	Result
Gold	Winner
Silver	Second place
Bronze	Third place
Green	Points classification
Blue	Non-points classification
Blue	Non-classified finish (NC)
Purple	Retired, not classified (Ret)
Red	Did not qualify (DNQ)
Red	Did not pre-qualify (DNPQ)
Black	Disqualified (DSQ)
White	Did not start (DNS)
White	Withdrew (WD)
White	Race cancelled (C)
Blank	Did not practice (DNP)
Blank	Did not arrive (DNA)
Blank	Excluded (EX)

**Bold** – Pole
Italics – Fastest Lap
† — Did not finish, but classified

=== Teams' championship ===
Ahead of each event, the teams nominate two drivers that accumulate teams' points.

Pos	Team	Points
1	(United Arab Emirates) Xcel Motorsport	595
2	(Germany) BWT Mücke Motorsport	413
3	(United Arab Emirates) Abu Dhabi Racing	258
4	(United Arab Emirates) Dragon Racing	80
5	(United Arab Emirates) 3Y Technology/Brand Racing	67
6	(United Arab Emirates) Dream Racing	11
