= Nico Göhler =

German racing driver (born 2003)

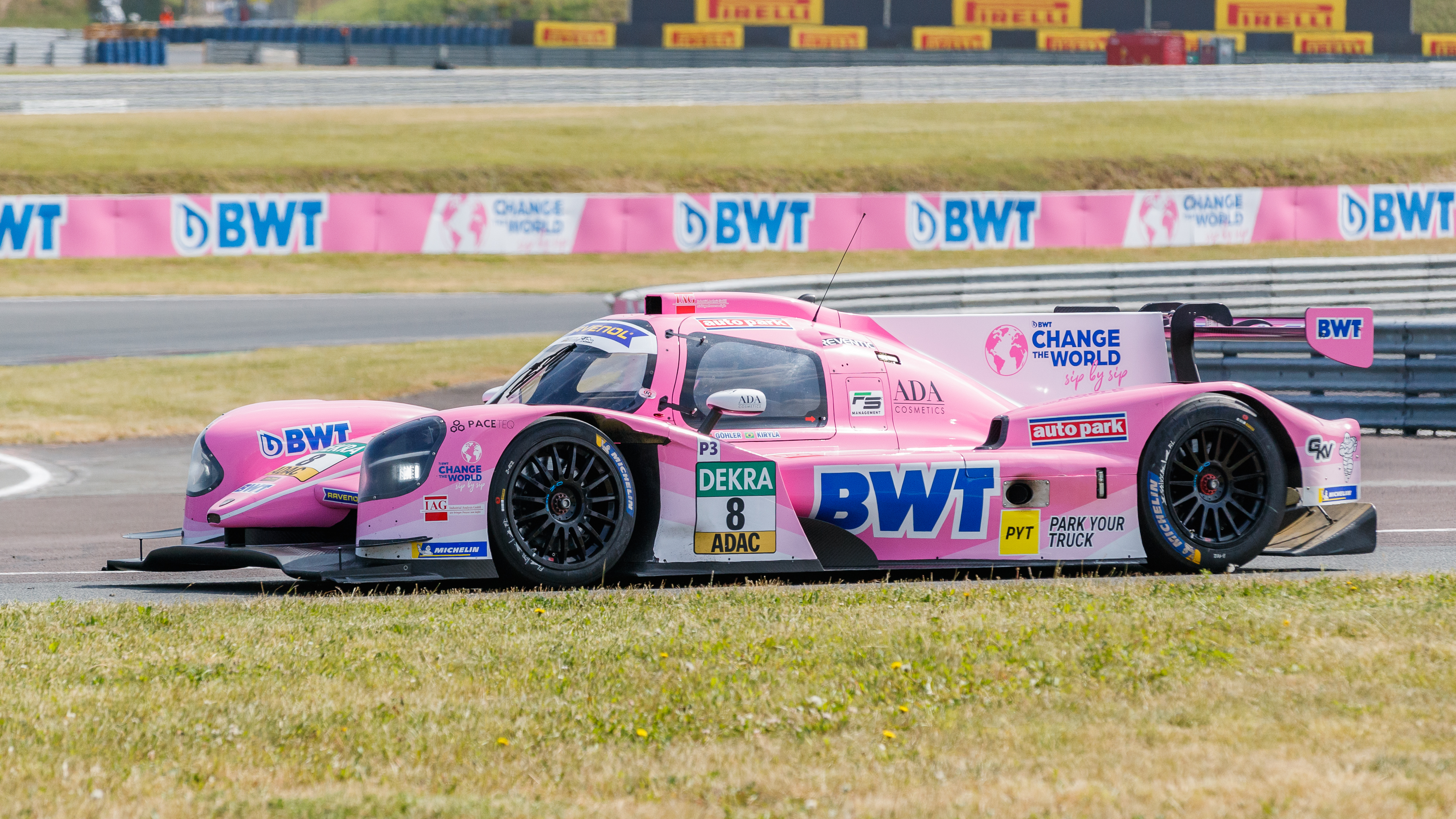
- Göhler in 2023
- Nationality: (Germany) German
- Born: 22 May 2003 (age 23) Grasleben, Germany

Formula Regional European Championship career
- Debut season: 2020
- Current team: KIC Motorsport
- Categorisation: FIA Silver
- Car number: 2
- Starts: 24 (26 entries)
- Wins: 0
- Podiums: 0
- Poles: 0
- Fastest laps: 0
- Best finish: 16th in 2020

Previous series
- 2019-20 2019 2019: Formula 4 UAE Championship; Italian F4 Championship; ADAC Formula 4

Nico Göhler (born 22 May 2003) is a German racing driver who last competed in the LMP3-spec Prototype Cup Germany for BWT Mücke Motorsport, finishing third in 2023. He previously won in Formula 4 and raced in FRECA.

== Career ==
=== Lower formulae ===
Born in Helmstedt, Göhler started his career in 2019 in the Formula 4 UAE Championship for Mücke Motorsport under an Emirati licence alongside Joshua Dürksen. His first podium came in the final race of the first event at the Dubai Autodrome with a third-place finish. He scored two more podiums, both in Dubai, and finished sixth in the standings, four positions behind teammate Dürksen.

Following that, Göhler signed for ADAC Berlin-Brandenburg to drive in the ADAC Formula 4 Championship, reuniting him with Dürksen. Göhler scored nine points throughout the season and came in 18th in the championship. He also raced for Mücke Motorsport in two rounds of the Italian F4 Championship.

In January 2020, Göhler once again competed in the F4 UAE Championship. He won four races, two each at the Dubai Autodrome and the Yas Marina Circuit and finished third in the drivers' standings, behind Lorenzo Fluxá and Champion Francesco Pizzi.

=== Formula Regional European Championship ===
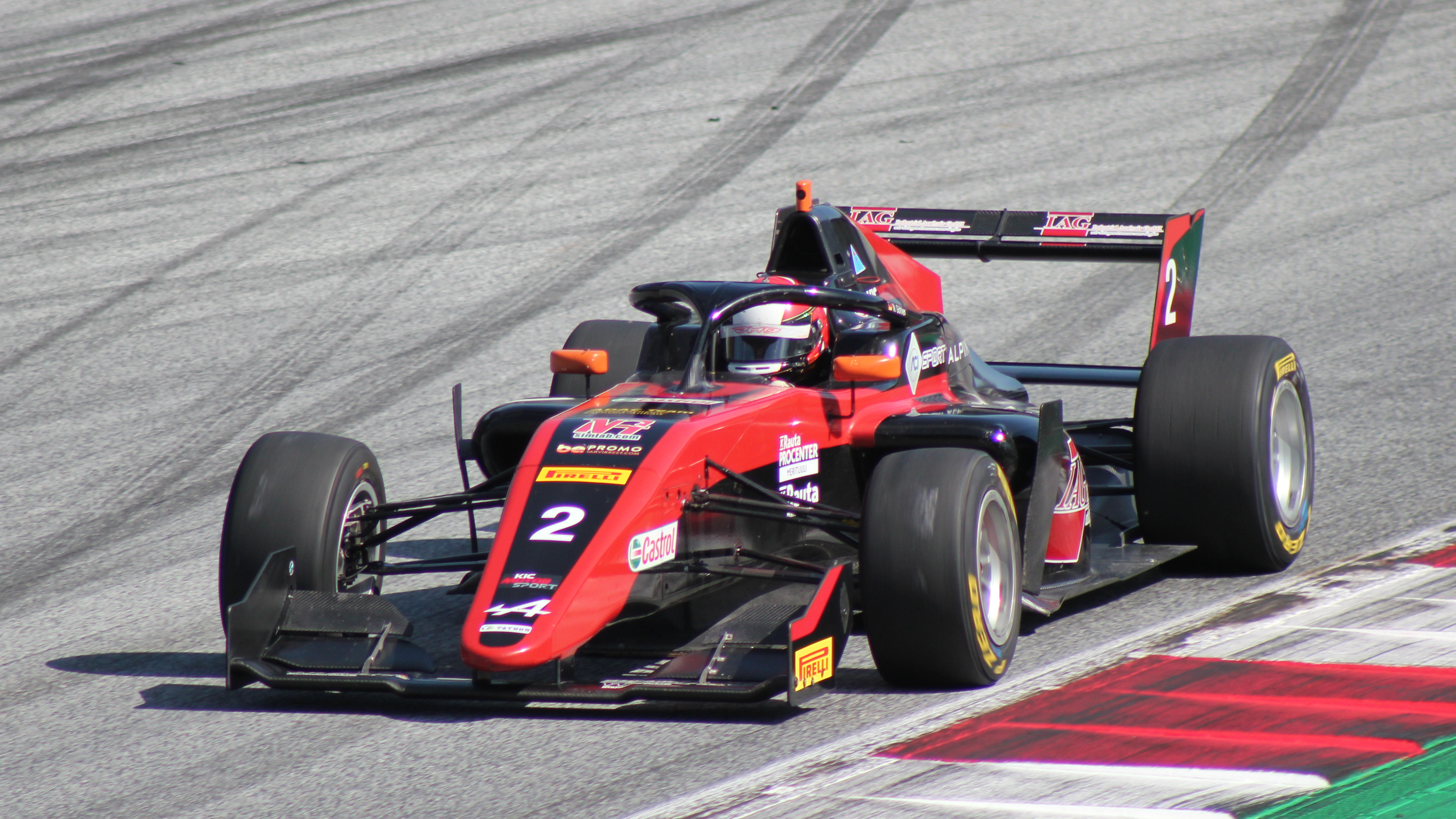
Göhler racing for KIC Motorsport in 2021.

In 2020, Göhler made his debut in the Formula Regional European Championship for KIC Motorsport in Austria. He scored points in the first two races of the weekend, although he was forced to retire from the final race. Göhler made another appearance at Monza. At the end of the year, Göhler had scored twelve points and finished 16th in the championship.

== Racing record ==
=== Racing career summary ===
Season	Series	Team	Races	Wins	Poles	F/Laps	Podiums	Points	Position
2019	Formula 4 UAE Championship	Mücke Motorsport	20	0	0	0	3	115	6th
2019	ADAC Formula 4 Championship	ADAC Berlin-Brandenburg	20	0	0	0	0	9	18th
2019	Italian F4 Championship	BWT Mücke Motorsport	6	0	0	0	0	0	33rd
2019	Formula 4 UAE Championship - Trophy Round	BWT Mücke Motorsport	2	0	0	0	0	N/A	NC
2020	Formula 4 UAE Championship	BWT Mücke Motorsport	19	4	0	1	10	174	**3rd**
2020	Formula Regional European Championship	KIC Motorsport	5	0	0	0	0	12	16th
2021	Formula Regional European Championship	KIC Motorsport	19	0	0	0	0	0	34th
2023	Prototype Cup Germany	BWT Mücke Motorsport	12	0	1	1	3	133	**3rd**
2023	GT4 European Series - Silver	BWT Mücke Motorsport	2	0	0	0	0	0	NC

* Season still in progress.

=== Complete Formula 4 UAE Championship results ===
(key) (Races in bold indicate pole position; races in italics indicate fastest lap)

Year	Team	1	2	3	4	5	6	7	8	9	10	11	12	13	14	15	16	17	18	19	20	DC	Points
2019	Mücke Motorsport	DUB1; 1; 8	DUB1; 2; 5	DUB1; 3; 6	DUB1; 4; 3	YMC1; 1 Ret	YMC1; 2; 10	YMC1; 3 Ret	YMC1; 4; 8	DUB2; 1 Ret	DUB2; 2; 2	DUB2; 3; 4	DUB2; 4; 10	YMC2; 1; 9	YMC2; 2; 8	YMC2; 3; 5	YMC2; 4; 6	DUB3; 1 Ret	DUB3; 2; 5	DUB3; 3; 2	DUB3; 4; 8	6th	133
2020	BWT Mücke Motorsport	DUB1; 1; 5	DUB1; 2; 8	DUB1; 3; 4	DUB1; 4 C	YMC1; 1; 3	YMC1; 2; 2	YMC1; 3; 4	YMC1; 4; 1	YMC2; 1; 1	YMC2; 2; 6	YMC2; 3; 4	YMC2; 4; 3	DUB2; 1; 2	DUB2; 2 Ret	DUB2; 3; 4	DUB2; 4; 1	DUB3; 1; 3	DUB3; 2; 1	DUB3; 3; 3	DUB3; 4; 8	3rd	270

=== Complete ADAC Formula 4 Championship results ===
(key) (Races in bold indicate pole position) (Races in italics indicate fastest lap)

Year	Team	1	2	3	4	5	6	7	8	9	10	11	12	13	14	15	16	17	18	19	20	Pos	Points
2019	ADAC Berlin-Brandenburg e.V.	OSC; 1; 16	OSC; 2; 13	OSC; 3; 14	RBR; 1; 15	RBR; 2 Ret	RBR; 3; 17	HOC; 1; 11	HOC; 2 Ret	ZAN; 1; 10	ZAN; 2; 7	ZAN; 3; 12	NÜR; 1; 14	NÜR; 2; 16	NÜR; 3; 13	HOC; 1 Ret	HOC; 2; 13	HOC; 3; 14	SAC; 1; 11	SAC; 2; 14	SAC; 3; 13	18th	9

=== Complete Italian F4 Championship results ===
(key) (Races in bold indicate pole position) (Races in italics indicate fastest lap)

Year	Team	1	2	3	4	5	6	7	8	9	10	11	12	13	14	15	16	17	18	19	20	21	22	Pos	Points
2019	BWT Mücke Motorsport	VLL; 1	VLL; 2	VLL; 3	MIS; 1	MIS; 2	MIS; 3	HUN; 1; 16	HUN; 2; 19	HUN; 3; 23	RBR; 1; 21	RBR; 2; 14	RBR; 3; 24	IMO; 1	IMO; 2	IMO; 3	IMO; 4	MUG; 1	MUG; 2	MUG; 3	MNZ; 1	MNZ; 2	MNZ; 3	33rd	0

=== Complete Formula Regional European Championship results ===
(key) (Races in bold indicate pole position) (Races in italics indicate fastest lap)

Year	Team	1	2	3	4	5	6	7	8	9	10	11	12	13	14	15	16	17	18	19	20	21	22	23	24	DC	Points
2020	KIC Motorsport	MIS; 1	MIS; 2	MIS; 3	LEC; 1	LEC; 2	LEC; 3	RBR; 1; 6	RBR; 2; 9	RBR; 3 Ret	MUG; 1	MUG; 2	MUG; 3	MNZ; 1; 9	MNZ; 2 Ret	MNZ; 3 DNS	CAT; 1	CAT; 2	CAT; 3	IMO; 1	IMO; 2	IMO; 3	VLL; 1	VLL; 2	VLL; 3	16th	12
2021	KIC Motorsport	IMO; 1; 21	IMO; 2 Ret	CAT; 1; 24	CAT; 2; 28	MCO; 1 DNQ	MCO; 2; 19	LEC; 1; 27	LEC; 2; 27	ZAN; 1; 22	ZAN; 2; 26	SPA; 1; 23	SPA; 2; 24	RBR; 1; 26	RBR; 2; 22	VAL; 1; 28	VAL; 2; 24	MUG; 1 Ret	MUG; 2; 26	MNZ; 1; 19	MNZ; 2; 24					34th	0

=== Complete Prototype Cup Germany results ===
(key) (Races in bold indicate pole position) (Races in italics indicate fastest lap)

Year	Team	Car	Engine	1	2	3	4	5	6	7	8	9	10	11	12	DC	Points
2023	BWT Mücke Motorsport	Duqueine M30 - D08	Nissan VK56DE 5.6 L V8	HOC; 1; 4	HOC; 2; 5	OSC; 1; 15	OSC; 2; 5	ZAN; 1; 2	ZAN; 2; 11	NOR; 1; 4	NOR; 2; 2	ASS; 1; 7	ASS; 2 Ret	NÜR; 1; 5	**NÜR**; **2**; 3	3rd	134
