= 2019 ADAC Formula 4 Championship =

5th season of FIA racing series

The 2019 ADAC Formula 4 Championship was the fifth season of the ADAC Formula 4, an open-wheel motor racing series. It was a multi-event motor racing championship that featured drivers competing in 1.4 litre Tatuus-Abarth single seat race cars that conformed to the technical regulations for the championship. It began on 27 April at Oschersleben and finished on 29 September at Sachsenring after seven triple header rounds.

== Teams and drivers ==
Team	No.	Driver	Status	Rounds
(Germany) ADAC Berlin-Brandenburg	2	(Germany) Nico Göhler	R	All
(Germany) ADAC Berlin-Brandenburg	12	(Kosovo) Kristian Thaqi	R	6–7
(Germany) ADAC Berlin-Brandenburg	25	(Finland) William Alatalo		2
(Germany) ADAC Berlin-Brandenburg	26	(Paraguay) Joshua Dürksen	R	All
(Germany) ADAC Berlin-Brandenburg	47	(Austria) Nico Gruber		1
(Italy) Prema Powerteam	3	(Estonia) Paul Aron	R	All
(Italy) Prema Powerteam	5	(Brazil) Gianluca Petecof		All
(Italy) Prema Powerteam	10	(Denmark) Oliver Rasmussen		All
(Italy) Prema Powerteam	11	(Venezuela) Alessandro Famularo		1–4
(Netherlands) Van Amersfoort Racing	4	(Germany) Niklas Krütten		1–4
(Netherlands) Van Amersfoort Racing	6	(Israel) Ido Cohen		All
(Netherlands) Van Amersfoort Racing	8	(Germany) Lucas Alecco Roy (Note: Lucas Alecco Roy is a German driver competing under a German racing licence but in some race protocols mistakenly listed as Monegasque, because Monaco is his hometown.)		All
(Netherlands) Van Amersfoort Racing	16	(Germany) Sebastian Estner		All
(Netherlands) Van Amersfoort Racing	62	(Norway) Dennis Hauger		All
(Germany) US Racing-CHRS	7	(Czech Republic) Roman Staněk	R	All
(Germany) US Racing-CHRS	17	(Monaco) Arthur Leclerc		All
(Germany) US Racing-CHRS	21	(France) Théo Pourchaire		All
(Germany) US Racing-CHRS	28	(France) Alessandro Ghiretti		All
(France) R-ace GP	14	(Switzerland) Grégoire Saucy		All
(France) R-ace GP	15	(Hungary) László Tóth		All
(France) R-ace GP	19	(France) Hadrien David	R G	4–5
(France) R-ace GP	44	(Russia) Michael Belov		2–7
(Switzerland) Jenzer Motorsport	22	(Argentina) Giorgio Carrara	G	2–3
(Switzerland) Jenzer Motorsport	23	(United Kingdom) Jonny Edgar	R G	2–3
(Switzerland) Jenzer Motorsport	24	(Switzerland) Axel Gnos	R G	2–3
(Italy) DRZ Benelli	32	(Russia) Ivan Berets	G	2
(Italy) DRZ Benelli	33	(Finland) Jesse Salmenautio	G	2
(Italy) Cram Motorsport	55	(Israel) Roee Meyuhas	R G	2
(Italy) BVM Racing	77	(Romania) Filip Ugran	R G	3

Icon	Legend
R	Rookie
G	Guest drivers ineligible to score points

== Race calendar and results ==
Venues for the 2019 season were announced with the first Hockenheim round as support event of the 2019 German Grand Prix, while other event are scheduled to support 2019 ADAC GT Masters.

Round		Circuit	Date	Pole position	Fastest lap	Winning driver	Winning team	Rookie winner
1	R1	(Germany) Motorsport Arena Oschersleben, Oschersleben	27 April	(Brazil) Gianluca Petecof	(Brazil) Gianluca Petecof	(Brazil) Gianluca Petecof	(Italy) Prema Powerteam	(Czech Republic) Roman Staněk
1	R2	(Germany) Motorsport Arena Oschersleben, Oschersleben	28 April	(Norway) Dennis Hauger	(Norway) Dennis Hauger	(Germany) Niklas Krütten	(Netherlands) Van Amersfoort Racing	(Estonia) Paul Aron
1	R3	(Germany) Motorsport Arena Oschersleben, Oschersleben	28 April		(Brazil) Gianluca Petecof	(Czech Republic) Roman Staněk	(Germany) US Racing-CHRS	(Czech Republic) Roman Staněk
2	R1	(Austria) Red Bull Ring, Spielberg	8 June	(Norway) Dennis Hauger	(Norway) Dennis Hauger	(Norway) Dennis Hauger	(Netherlands) Van Amersfoort Racing	(Czech Republic) Roman Staněk
2	R2	(Austria) Red Bull Ring, Spielberg	9 June	(Norway) Dennis Hauger	(Norway) Dennis Hauger	(France) Théo Pourchaire (Note: Dennis Hauger won the race, but was subsequently issued with a 30 second time penalty.)	(Germany) US Racing-CHRS	(Estonia) Paul Aron
2	R3	(Austria) Red Bull Ring, Spielberg	9 June		(Germany) Lucas Alecco Roy	(Estonia) Paul Aron	(Italy) Prema Powerteam	(Estonia) Paul Aron
3	R1	(Germany) Hockenheimring, Hockenheim	27 July	(France) Théo Pourchaire	(Norway) Dennis Hauger	(Norway) Dennis Hauger	(Netherlands) Van Amersfoort Racing	(United Kingdom) Jonny Edgar
3	R2	(Germany) Hockenheimring, Hockenheim	28 July	(Monaco) Arthur Leclerc	(Monaco) Arthur Leclerc	(Monaco) Arthur Leclerc	(Germany) US Racing-CHRS	(Czech Republic) Roman Staněk
4	R1	(Netherlands) Circuit Zandvoort, Zandvoort	10 August	(France) Théo Pourchaire	(Czech Republic) Roman Staněk	(Venezuela) Alessandro Famularo	(Italy) Prema Powerteam	(Czech Republic) Roman Staněk
4	R2	(Netherlands) Circuit Zandvoort, Zandvoort	11 August	(Brazil) Gianluca Petecof	(Norway) Dennis Hauger	(Estonia) Paul Aron	(Italy) Prema Powerteam	(Estonia) Paul Aron
4	R3	(Netherlands) Circuit Zandvoort, Zandvoort	11 August		(Russia) Michael Belov	(Germany) Sebastian Estner	(Netherlands) Van Amersfoort Racing	(France) Hadrien David
5	R1	(Germany) Nürburgring, Nürburg	17 August	(Norway) Dennis Hauger	(Czech Republic) Roman Staněk	(France) Théo Pourchaire	(Germany) US Racing-CHRS	(Czech Republic) Roman Staněk
5	R2	(Germany) Nürburgring, Nürburg	18 August	(France) Théo Pourchaire	(Norway) Dennis Hauger	(France) Théo Pourchaire	(Germany) US Racing-CHRS	(Paraguay) Joshua Dürksen
5	R3	(Germany) Nürburgring, Nürburg	18 August		(France) Théo Pourchaire	(Czech Republic) Roman Staněk	(Germany) US Racing-CHRS	(Czech Republic) Roman Staněk
6	R1	(Germany) Hockenheimring, Hockenheim	14 September	(France) Théo Pourchaire	(Paraguay) Joshua Dürksen	(Norway) Dennis Hauger	(Netherlands) Van Amersfoort Racing	(Paraguay) Joshua Dürksen
6	R2	(Germany) Hockenheimring, Hockenheim	15 September	(Norway) Dennis Hauger	(France) Théo Pourchaire	(Norway) Dennis Hauger	(Netherlands) Van Amersfoort Racing	(Paraguay) Joshua Dürksen
6	R3	(Germany) Hockenheimring, Hockenheim	15 September		(Norway) Dennis Hauger	(Norway) Dennis Hauger	(Netherlands) Van Amersfoort Racing	(Czech Republic) Roman Staněk
7	R1	(Germany) Sachsenring, Chemnitz	28 September	(France) Théo Pourchaire	(Norway) Dennis Hauger	(Russia) Michael Belov	(France) R-ace GP	(Estonia) Paul Aron
7	R2	(Germany) Sachsenring, Chemnitz	28 September	(France) Théo Pourchaire	(Brazil) Gianluca Petecof	(France) Théo Pourchaire	(Germany) US Racing-CHRS	(Paraguay) Joshua Dürksen
7	R3	(Germany) Sachsenring, Chemnitz	29 September		(Monaco) Arthur Leclerc	(Norway) Dennis Hauger (Note: Joshua Dürksen won the race, but was subsequently issued with a 30 second time penalty.)	(Netherlands) Van Amersfoort Racing	(Czech Republic) Roman Staněk

== Championship standings ==
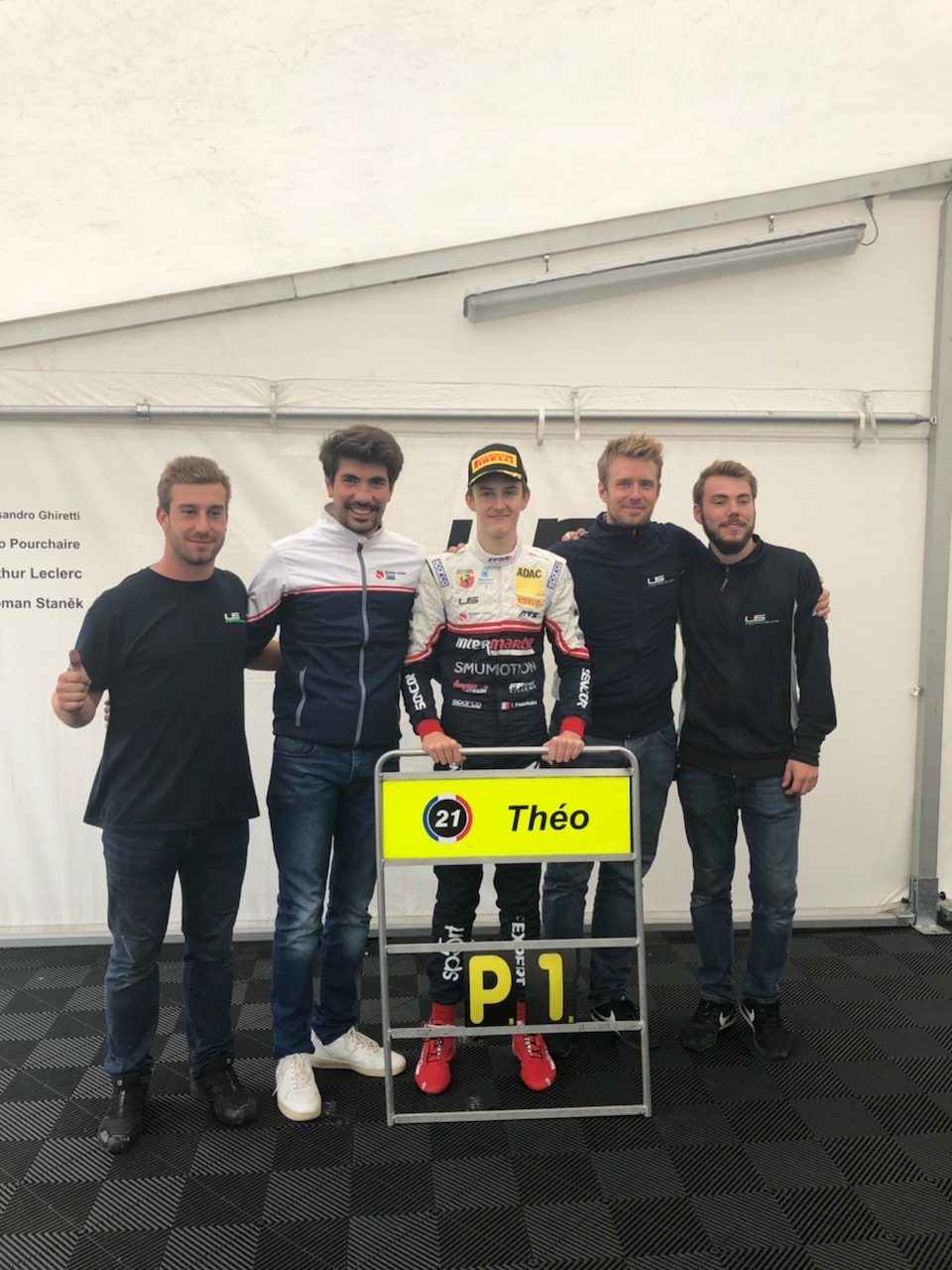
Théo Pourchaire wins the title on the last race at the Sachsenring by seven points.

Points are awarded to the top 10 classified finishers in each race. No points are awarded for pole position or fastest lap.

Position	**1st**	**2nd**	**3rd**	**4th**	**5th**	**6th**	**7th**	**8th**	**9th**	**10th**
Points	25	18	15	12	10	8	6	4	2	1

=== Drivers' Championship ===
Pos	Driver	OSC (Germany)			RBR (Austria)			HOC1 (Germany)		ZAN (Netherlands)			NÜR (Germany)			HOC2 (Germany)			SAC (Germany)			Pts
Pos	Driver	R1	R2	R3	R1	R2	R3	R1	R2	R1	R2	R3	R1	R2	R3	R1	R2	R3	R1	R2	R3	Pts
1	(France) Théo Pourchaire	5	2	10	12	1	3	**2**	3	**3**	3	7	1	**1**	11	**14**	12	6	**2**	**1**	2	258
2	(Norway) Dennis Hauger	3	**14**	15	**1**	**14**	21	1	2	9	17	6	**Ret**	5	2	1	**1**	1	4	2	1	251
3	(Monaco) Arthur Leclerc	12	3	4	6	3	4	10	**1**	2	Ret	Ret	10	3	5	2	3	Ret	6	5	3	202
4	(Czech Republic) Roman Staněk	2	8	1	7	21	7	13	5	4	14	11	2	8	1	8	10	2	10	8	6	165
5	(Brazil) Gianluca Petecof	**1**	16	Ret	5	4	Ret	3	4	5	**11**	Ret	3	9	Ret	6	2	7	7	3	5	164
6	(France) Alessandro Ghiretti	10	7	3	2	Ret	6	18	6	13	4	2	4	4	4	Ret	14	8	8	7	DSQ	136
7	(Estonia) Paul Aron	6	4	7	23	6	1	16	Ret	15	1	Ret	7	10	6	4	9	Ret	5	11	7	129
8	(Russia) Michael Belov				13	20	12	4	Ret	6	5	5	6	2	8	Ret	5	4	1	9	14	122
9	(Switzerland) Grégoire Saucy	13	6	6	16	16	10	19	10	7	6	3	9	12	9	5	11	10	3	4	Ret	95
10	(Germany) Niklas Krütten	4	1	8	8	8	2	Ret	7	8	9	4										93
11	(Paraguay) Joshua Dürksen	9	5	2	Ret	9	20	20	12	Ret	10	Ret	11	7	Ret	3	4	9	Ret	6	10	80
12	(Denmark) Oliver Rasmussen	Ret	12	5	9	10	8	7	11	14	2	9	12	6	3	9	8	Ret	14	12	12	76
13	(Israel) Ido Cohen	8	Ret	11	10	5	13	6	17	12	13	14	5	13	10	7	7	3	12	13	4	76
14	(Germany) Sebastian Estner	15	9	9	11	13	16	12	Ret	Ret	8	1	13	15	12	10	6	5	9	Ret	Ret	55
15	(Venezuela) Alessandro Famularo	7	10	Ret	4	11	Ret	Ret	Ret	1	12	8										49
16	(Finland) William Alatalo				3	2	5															43
17	(Germany) Lucas Alecco Roy	11	Ret	Ret	21	12	19	8	9	Ret	15	13	Ret	14	Ret	12	15	13	15	10	11	11
18	(Germany) Nico Göhler	16	13	14	15	Ret	17	11	Ret	10	7	12	14	16	13	Ret	13	14	11	14	13	9
19	(Kosovo) Kristian Thaqi															13	17	11	16	Ret	8	4
20	(Hungary) László Tóth	17	11	12	20	19	Ret	17	15	11	18	Ret	15	17	14	11	16	12	13	Ret	9	2
21	(Austria) Nico Gruber	14	15	13																		0
Guest drivers ineligible to score points
	(Argentina) Giorgio Carrara				22	7	Ret	5	8													
	(France) Hadrien David									Ret	16	10	8	11	7							
	(United Kingdom) Jonny Edgar				14	Ret	11	9	13													
	(Finland) Jesse Salmenautio				17	15	9															
	(Romania) Filip Ugran							14	14													
	(Russia) Ivan Berets				Ret	Ret	14															
	(Switzerland) Axel Gnos				18	18	18	15	16													
	(Israel) Roee Meyuhas				19	17	15															
Pos	Driver	R1	R2	R3	R1	R2	R3	R1	R2	R1	R2	R3	R1	R2	R3	R1	R2	R3	R1	R2	R3	Pts
Pos	Driver	OSC (Germany)			RBR (Austria)			HOC1 (Germany)		ZAN (Netherlands)			NÜR (Germany)			HOC2 (Germany)			SAC (Germany)			Pts

Colour	Result
Gold	Winner
Silver	Second place
Bronze	Third place
Green	Points classification
Blue	Non-points classification
Blue	Non-classified finish (NC)
Purple	Retired, not classified (Ret)
Red	Did not qualify (DNQ)
Red	Did not pre-qualify (DNPQ)
Black	Disqualified (DSQ)
White	Did not start (DNS)
White	Withdrew (WD)
White	Race cancelled (C)
Blank	Did not practice (DNP)
Blank	Did not arrive (DNA)
Blank	Excluded (EX)

**Bold** – Pole
Italics – Fastest Lap

=== Rookie Championship ===
Pos	Driver	OSC (Germany)			RBR (Austria)			HOC1 (Germany)		ZAN (Netherlands)			NÜR (Germany)			HOC2 (Germany)			SAC (Germany)			Pts
Pos	Driver	R1	R2	R3	R1	R2	R3	R1	R2	R1	R2	R3	R1	R2	R3	R1	R2	R3	R1	R2	R3	Pts
1	(Czech Republic) Roman Staněk	2	8	1	7	21	7	13	5	4	14	11	2	8	1	8	10	2	10	8	6	412
2	(Estonia) Paul Aron	6	4	7	23	8	1	16	Ret	15	1	Ret	7	10	6	5	9	Ret	5	11	7	323
3	(Paraguay) Joshua Dürksen	9	5	2	Ret	10	20	20	12	Ret	10	Ret	11	7	Ret	3	4	9	Ret	6	10	271
4	(Germany) Nico Göhler	16	13	14	15	Ret	17	11	Ret	10	7	12	14	16	13	Ret	13	14	11	14	13	248
5	(Kosovo) Kristian Thaqi															13	17	11	16	Ret	8	64
Guest drivers ineligible to score points
	(France) Hadrien David									Ret	16	10	8	11	7							
	(United Kingdom) Jonny Edgar				14	Ret	11	9	13													
	(Romania) Filip Ugran							14	14													
	(Switzerland) Axel Gnos				18	18	18	15	16													
	(Israel) Roee Meyuhas				19	17	15															
Pos	Driver	R1	R2	R3	R1	R2	R3	R1	R2	R1	R2	R3	R1	R2	R3	R1	R2	R3	R1	R2	R3	Pts
Pos	Driver	OSC (Germany)			RBR (Austria)			HOC1 (Germany)		ZAN (Netherlands)			NÜR (Germany)			HOC2 (Germany)			SAC (Germany)			Pts

=== Teams' Championship ===
Before each round, teams nominate two drivers to be eligible for Teams' Championship points.

Pos	Driver	OSC (Germany)			RBR (Austria)			HOC1 (Germany)		ZAN (Netherlands)			NÜR (Germany)			HOC2 (Germany)			SAC (Germany)			Pts
Pos	Driver	R1	R2	R3	R1	R2	R3	R1	R2	R1	R2	R3	R1	R2	R3	R1	R2	R3	R1	R2	R3	Pts
1	(Germany) US Racing-CHRS	5	2	4	6	1	3	2	1	2	3	7	1	1	5	2	3	6	2	1	2	528
1	(Germany) US Racing-CHRS	12	3	10	12	3	4	10	3	3	Ret	Ret	7	3	10	14	12	Ret	6	5	3	528
2	(Netherlands) Van Amersfoort Racing	3	1	8	1	8	2	1	2	8	9	4	5	5	2	1	1	1	4	2	1	487
2	(Netherlands) Van Amersfoort Racing	4	14	15	8	14	21	Ret	7	9	17	6	Ret	13	10	7	7	3	12	13	4	487
3	(Italy) Prema Powerteam	1	4	7	5	4	1	3	4	5	1	Ret	3	9	6	4	2	7	5	3	5	367
3	(Italy) Prema Powerteam	6	16	Ret	23	6	Ret	16	Ret	15	11	Ret	7	10	Ret	6	9	Ret	7	11	7	367
4	(France) R-ace GP	13	6	6	13	16	10	4	10	6	5	3	6	2	8	5	5	4	1	4	14	341
4	(France) R-ace GP	17	11	12	16	20	12	19	Ret	7	6	5	9	12	9	Ret	11	10	3	9	Ret	341
5	(Germany) ADAC Berlin-Brandenburg	9	5	2	3	2	5	11	12	10	7	12	11	7	13	3	4	9	11	6	10	233
5	(Germany) ADAC Berlin-Brandenburg	14	15	13	Ret	9	20	20	Ret	Ret	10	Ret	14	16	Ret	Ret	13	14	Ret	14	13	233
Guest teams ineligible to score points
	(Switzerland) Jenzer Motorsport				14	7	11	5	8													
	(Switzerland) Jenzer Motorsport				18	18	18	9	13													
	(Italy) DRZ Benelli				17	15	9															
	(Italy) DRZ Benelli				Ret	Ret	14															
	(Italy) BVM Racing							14	14													
	(Italy) Cram Motorsport				19	17	15															
Pos	Driver	R1	R2	R3	R1	R2	R3	R1	R2	R1	R2	R3	R1	R2	R3	R1	R2	R3	R1	R2	R3	Pts
Pos	Driver	OSC (Germany)			RBR (Austria)			HOC1 (Germany)		ZAN (Netherlands)			NÜR (Germany)			HOC2 (Germany)			SAC (Germany)			Pts
