= Federico Malvestiti =

Italian racing driver

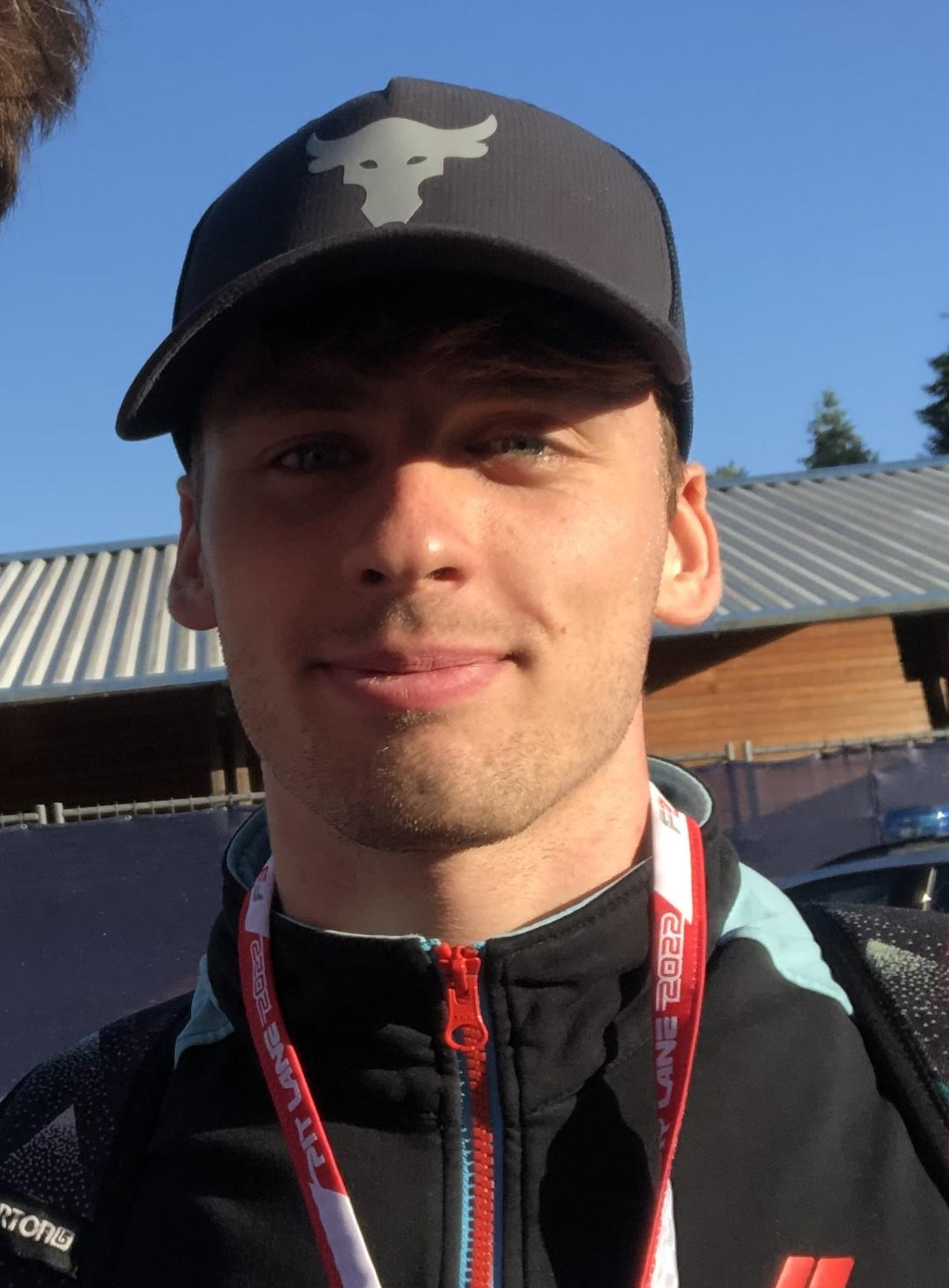
- Malvestiti in 2022
- Nationality: (Italy) Italian
- Born: 12 June 2000 (age 26) Monza, Italy

GTWC Europe Endurance Cup career
- Debut season: 2025
- Current team: BMW Italia Ceccato Racing
- Categorisation: FIA Silver
- Car number: 15
- Starts: 5 (5 entries)
- Wins: 0
- Podiums: 0
- Poles: 0
- Fastest laps: 0
- Best finish: 29th in 2025 (Bronze Cup)

Previous series
- 2024 2019–20, 2022 2019 2018 2015–18: Italian GT Sprint - Pro-Am; FIA Formula 3 Championship; Formula Renault Eurocup; ADAC Formula 4 Italian F4 Championship

Championship titles
- 2024: Italian GT Sprint - Pro-Am

Federico Malvestiti (born 12 June 2000) is an Italian racing driver. He most recently competed in the 2024 Italian GT Sprint Championship for BMW Italia Ceccato Racing and won the GT3 PRO-AM Division together with Brazilian racing driver Pedro Carvalho Ebrahim. He is a race winner in the Italian F4 Championship.

== Junior formula career ==
=== Karting ===
Malvestiti was born in Monza, and began karting in 2010 in events such as Easykart International Grand Final and Trofeo Nazionale Easykart.

=== Italian F4 ===
Malvestiti's first outing in single seaters was in Italian F4 in 2015 with Antonelli Motorsport, where he competed in two rounds, finishing no higher than 12th. In 2016, Malvestiti competed full time with Antonelli Motorsport where he scored points twice and finished 25th in the standings. Malvestiti's second season in 2017 saw him drive for Jenzer Motorsport. Malvestiti scored points six times and finished tenth in the standings. His third and last season in Italian F4 was his best as he would finish fifth in the standings with four podiums, two pole positions, and a win at Imola.

=== ADAC Formula 4 ===
Malvestiti took part as a guest driver in the 2018 ADAC Formula 4 Championship for Jenzer Motorsport at the second round at the Hockenheimring. Malvestiti finished seventh and tenth but as he was a guest driver, he did not score points.

=== Formula Renault Eurocup ===
In 2019, Malvestiti competed for Bhaitech in the Formula Renault Eurocup. His only podium came at Circuit de Spa-Francorchamps where he secured third place, four more points finishes took him to 14th in the table with 36 points.

=== FIA Formula 3 Championship ===
==== 2019 ====
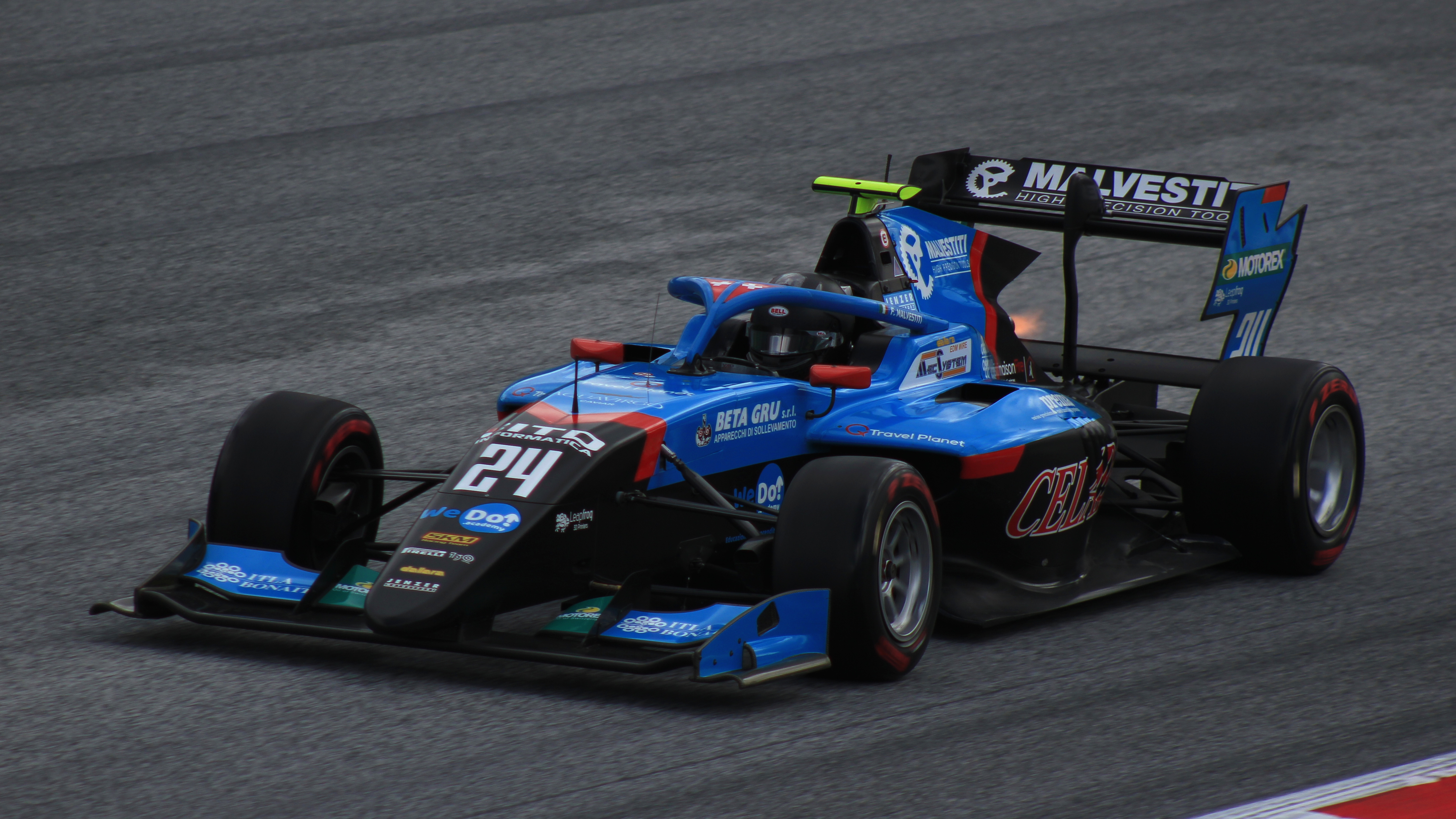
Malvestiti driving the Dallara F3 2019 during the 2022 Spielberg Formula 3 round.

Artem Petrov's lack of funding at the end of the first race in 2019 meant that Jenzer Motorsport replaced him with Giorgio Carrara. However, due to visa complications, Malvestiti replaced Carrara for the fourth round at Silverstone. He retired in the Feature race due to a battery failure and finished 23rd in the sprint race.

==== 2020 ====
On 10 February 2020, Malvestiti announced he would be competing the full season with Jenzer, partnering Calan Williams and Matteo Nannini. He would experience a disappointing season, finishing 30th in the standings, having failed to score any points.

==== 2022 ====
In 2022, Malvestiti returned to Jenzer partnering Ido Cohen and William Alatalo. Malvestiti completed the season 29th in the standings, having scored no points and having a best finish of 13th.

== Sportscar career ==
Following a year out of racing, Malvestiti entered the 2024 Italian GT Sprint Championship in the Pro-Am class. Driving for BMW Italia Ceccato Racing, Malvestiti and teammate Pedro Carvalho Ebrahim scored an overall podium at the season finale in Monza and won the Pro-Am title in commanding fashion; they scored five class victories and only once finished off the podium.

Malvestiti remained with the team in 2025, moving into the Bronze Cup category of the GT World Challenge Europe Endurance Cup. Alongside teammates Felice Jelmini and Marcelo Tomasoni, Malvestiti finished 29th in the class standings.

== Karting record ==
=== Karting career summary ===
| Season | Series | Team | Position |
|---|---|---|---|
| 2010 | Trofeo Nazionale Easykart — 60cc | | 53rd |
| 2010 | Easykart International Grand Final — Easy 60 | VRK | NC |
| 2012 | Easykart International Grand Finals — Easy 100 | | 27th |
| 2014 | Andrea Margutti Trophy — KFJ | | 48th |

== Racing record ==
=== Career summary ===
| Season | Series | Team | Races | Wins | Poles | F/Laps | Podiums | Points | Position |
|---|---|---|---|---|---|---|---|---|---|
| 2015 | Italian F4 Championship | Antonelli Motorsport | 6 | 0 | 0 | 0 | 0 | 0 | 31st |
| 2016 | Italian F4 Championship | Antonelli Motorsport | 19 | 0 | 0 | 0 | 0 | 10 | 25th |
| 2017 | Italian F4 Championship | Jenzer Motorsport | 21 | 0 | 0 | 0 | 0 | 19 | 10th |
| 2018 | Italian F4 Championship | Jenzer Motorsport | 21 | 1 | 2 | 2 | 4 | 173 | 6th |
| 2018 | ADAC Formula 4 Championship | Jenzer Motorsport | 2 | 0 | 0 | 0 | 0 | 0 | NC |
| 2018 | F4 Chinese Championship | Freely Racing Team | 2 | 0 | 0 | 0 | 0 | 8 | 22nd |
| 2019 | Formula Renault Eurocup | Bhaitech | 20 | 0 | 0 | 0 | 1 | 36 | 14th |
| 2019 | FIA Formula 3 Championship | Jenzer Motorsport | 2 | 0 | 0 | 0 | 0 | 0 | 34th |
| 2020 | FIA Formula 3 Championship | Jenzer Motorsport | 18 | 0 | 0 | 0 | 0 | 0 | 30th |
| 2021 | Porsche Carrera Cup Italia | Ghinzani Arco Motorsport | 11 | 0 | 0 | 0 | 0 | 35 | 16th |
| 2022 | FIA Formula 3 Championship | Jenzer Motorsport | 16 | 0 | 0 | 0 | 0 | 0 | 29th |
| 2024 | Italian GT Sprint Championship - GT3 Pro-Am | BMW Italia Ceccato Racing | 8 | 5 | 3 | 2 | 7 | 129 | **1st** |
| 2025 | GT World Challenge Europe Endurance Cup | BMW Italia Ceccato Racing | 5 | 0 | 0 | 0 | 0 | 0 | NC |
| 2025 | GT World Challenge Europe Endurance Cup - Bronze Cup | BMW Italia Ceccato Racing | 5 | 0 | 0 | 0 | 0 | 11 | 29th |
| 2026 | Italian GT Championship Sprint Cup - GT3 | AKM Motorsport | 8 | 0 | 0 | 0 | 0 | 0 | NC |

=== Complete Italian F4 Championship results ===
(key) (Races in bold indicate pole position) (Races in italics indicate fastest lap)

| Year | Team | 1 | 2 | 3 | 4 | 5 | 6 | 7 | 8 | 9 | 10 | 11 | 12 | 13 | 14 | 15 | 16 | 17 | 18 | 19 | 20 | 21 | 22 | 23 | Pos | Points |
|---|---|---|---|---|---|---|---|---|---|---|---|---|---|---|---|---|---|---|---|---|---|---|---|---|---|---|
| 2015 | Antonelli Motorsport | VLL; 1 | VLL; 2 | VLL; 3 | MNZ; 1 | MNZ; 2 | MNZ; 3 | IMO1; 1 | IMO1; 2 | IMO1; 3 | MUG; 1 | MUG; 2 | MUG; 3 | ADR; 1; 16 | ADR; 2; 12 | ADR; 3; 20 | IMO2; 1 | IMO2; 2 | IMO2; 3 | MIS; 1; 20 | MIS; 2; 17 | MIS; 3; 19 | | | 31st | 0 |
| 2016 | Antonelli Motorsport | MIS; 1; 17 | MIS; 2 | MIS; 3; 15 | MIS; 4; 18 | ADR; 1; 8 | ADR; 2 | ADR; 3; 7 | ADR; 4; 11 | IMO1; 1 Ret | IMO1; 2 DNS | IMO1; 3 DNS | MUG; 1; 22 | MUG; 2; 24 | MUG; 3; 25 | VLL; 1; 24 | VLL; 2; 17 | VLL; 3; 18 | IMO2; 1; 20 | IMO2; 2; 14 | IMO2; 3; 23 | MNZ; 1; 14 | MNZ; 2 Ret | MNZ; 3; 10 | 25th | 10 |
| 2017 | Jenzer Motorsport | MIS; 1; 14 | MIS; 2 Ret | MIS; 3; 11 | ADR; 1; 11 | ADR; 2; 11 | ADR; 3; 10 | VLL; 1; 16 | VLL; 2; 16 | VLL; 3; 18 | MUG1; 1; 10 | MUG1; 2 Ret | MUG1; 3; 10 | IMO; 1 Ret | IMO; 2; 13 | IMO; 3; 8 | MUG2; 1; 14 | MUG2; 2 Ret | MUG2; 3; 11 | MNZ; 1 Ret | MNZ; 2; 8 | MNZ; 3; 7 | | | 10th | 19 |
| 2018 | Jenzer Motorsport | ADR; 1; 3 | ADR; 2; 7 | ADR; 3; 9 | LEC; 1; 5 | LEC; 2; 16 | LEC; 3; 14 | MNZ; 1; 5 | MNZ; 2; 5 | MNZ; 3; 6 | MIS; 1; 5 | MIS; 2; 5 | MIS; 3; 12 | IMO; 1; 2 | IMO; 2; 4 | **IMO**; **3**; 1 | VLL; 1; 3 | VLL; 2; 9 | VLL; 3; 7 | MUG; 1; 27 | MUG; 2; 7 | MUG; 3; 6 | | | 6th | 173 |

=== Complete Formula Renault Eurocup results ===
(key) (Races in bold indicate pole position) (Races in italics indicate fastest lap)

| Year | Team | 1 | 2 | 3 | 4 | 5 | 6 | 7 | 8 | 9 | 10 | 11 | 12 | 13 | 14 | 15 | 16 | 17 | 18 | 19 | 20 | Pos | Points |
|---|---|---|---|---|---|---|---|---|---|---|---|---|---|---|---|---|---|---|---|---|---|---|---|
| 2019 | Bhaitech | MNZ; 1; 5 | MNZ; 2; 13 | SIL; 1; 12 | SIL; 2; 19 | MON; 1; 14 | MON; 2; 18 | LEC; 1; 13 | LEC; 2; 17 | SPA; 1; 15 | SPA; 2; 3 | NÜR; 1; 15 | NÜR; 2 Ret | HUN; 1; 13 | HUN; 2; 14 | CAT; 1; 17 | CAT; 2; 8 | HOC; 1; 11 | HOC; 2; 7 | YMC; 1; 14 | YMC; 2; 14 | 14th | 36 |

=== Complete FIA Formula 3 Championship results ===
(key) (Races in bold indicate pole position; races in italics indicate points for the fastest lap of top ten finishers)

| Year | Entrant | 1 | 2 | 3 | 4 | 5 | 6 | 7 | 8 | 9 | 10 | 11 | 12 | 13 | 14 | 15 | 16 | 17 | 18 | DC | Points |
|---|---|---|---|---|---|---|---|---|---|---|---|---|---|---|---|---|---|---|---|---|---|
| 2019 | Jenzer Motorsport | CAT; FEA | CAT; SPR | LEC; FEA | LEC; SPR | RBR; FEA | RBR; SPR | SIL; FEA; Ret | SIL; SPR; 23 | HUN; FEA | HUN; SPR | SPA; FEA | SPA; SPR | MNZ; FEA | MNZ; SPR | SOC; FEA | SOC; FEA | | | 34th | 0 |
| 2020 | Jenzer Motorsport | RBR; FEA; 19 | RBR; SPR; 21 | RBR; FEA; 28 | RBR; SPR; 23 | HUN; FEA; 13 | HUN; SPR; Ret | SIL; FEA; 19 | SIL; SPR; 13 | SIL; FEA; Ret | SIL; SPR; 23 | CAT; FEA; 26 | CAT; SPR; Ret | SPA; FEA; 18 | SPA; SPR; 24 | MNZ; FEA; 22 | MNZ; SPR; 14 | MUG; FEA; 18 | MUG; SPR; 22 | 30th | 0 |
| 2022 | Jenzer Motorsport | BHR; SPR | BHR; FEA | IMO; SPR; Ret | IMO; FEA; 21 | CAT; SPR; 19 | CAT; FEA; 21 | SIL; SPR; 25 | SIL; FEA; 13 | RBR; SPR; 21 | RBR; FEA; 26 | HUN; SPR; 25 | HUN; FEA; 25 | SPA; SPR; 18 | SPA; FEA; 26 | ZAN; SPR; 24 | ZAN; FEA; 20 | MNZ; SPR; 16 | MNZ; SPR; 18 | 29th | 0 |
