= Lorenzo Colombo (racing driver) =

Italian racing driver (born 2000)

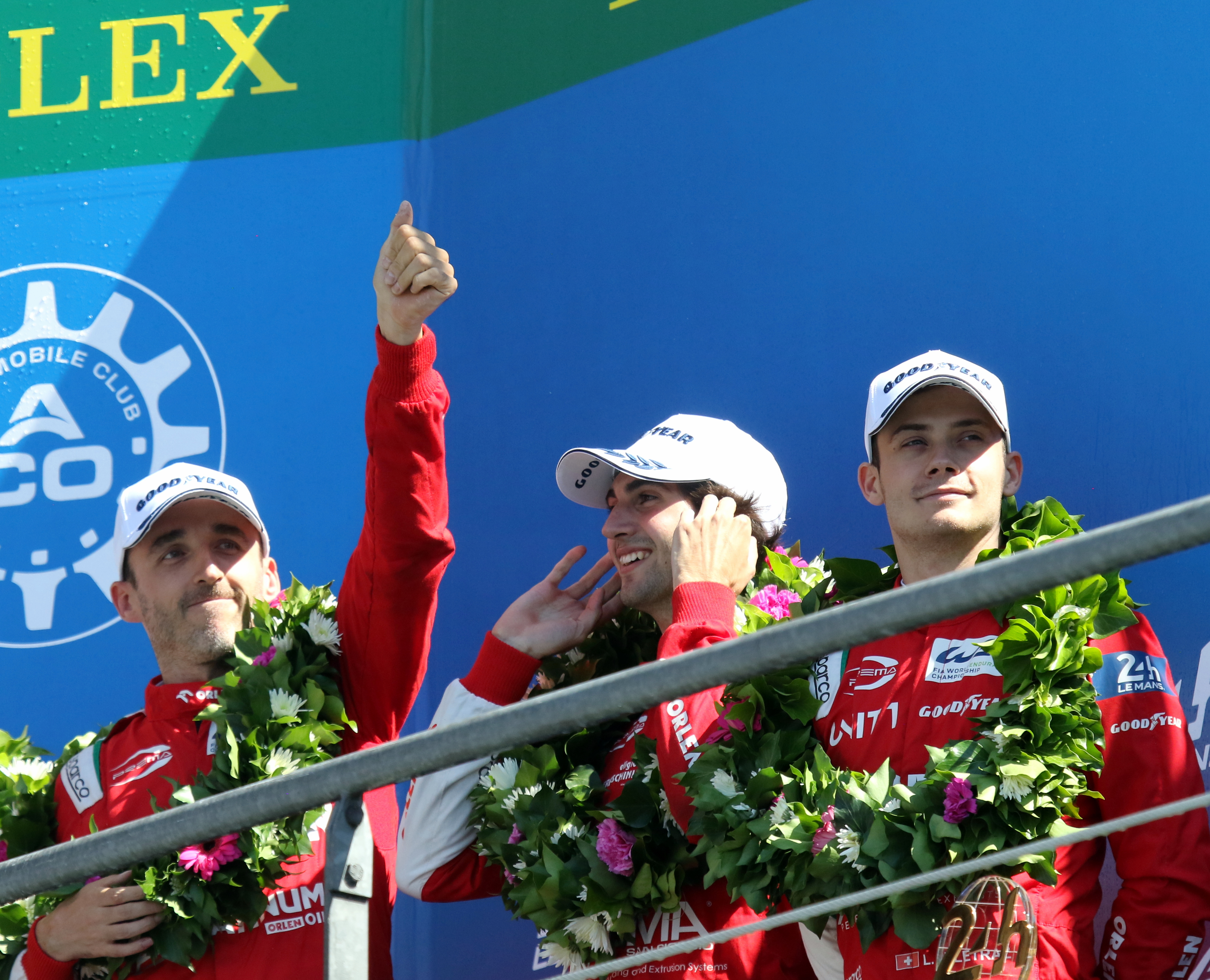
- Colombo (middle) on the 2022 24 Hours of Le Mans podium
- Nationality: (Italy) Italian
- Born: 13 September 2000 (age 26) Legnano, Italy

WEC career
- Debut season: 2022
- Current team: Prema Orlen Team
- Categorisation: FIA Silver (2022); FIA Gold (2023–)
- Car number: 9
- Co-driver: Louis Delétraz, Robert Kubica
- Starts: 6 (6 entries)
- Wins: 0
- Podiums: 1
- Poles: 0
- Fastest laps: 0
- Best finish: 5th in 2022

Previous series
- 2021 2018-2020 2016-2018 2017 2017: FIA Formula 3 Championship; Formula Renault Eurocup; Italian F4 Championship; ADAC Formula 4 Euroformula Open Championship

Lorenzo Colombo (born 13 September 2000) is an Italian racing driver who last competed for Prema Orlen Team in the 2022 FIA World Endurance Championship. He previously raced in the 2021 FIA Formula 3 Championship with Campos Racing.

== Early career ==
=== Karting ===
Born in Legnano, Colombo started his karting career in 2009. He predominantly competed in Italy, highlight of his karting career finishing second in the Andrea Margutti Trophy in 2018.

=== Lower formulae ===
In 2016, Colombo made his car racing debut in the Italian F4 Championship, driving for BVM Racing, where he finished 12th in the standings, having scored one podium at Imola.

Colombo continued to race in the Italian F4 Championship in 2017, partnering Leonardo Lorandi and Sebastián Fernández at Bhaitech. He would end up finishing third in the standings with two victories and 223 points.

Colombo also made a one-off appearance in the ADAC Formula 4 Championship that same year, scoring no points as he was a guest driver.

At the end of 2018, Colombo made a one-off appearance for R-ace GP in Italian F4, which yielded three points in three races.

=== Formula Renault Eurocup ===
==== 2018 ====
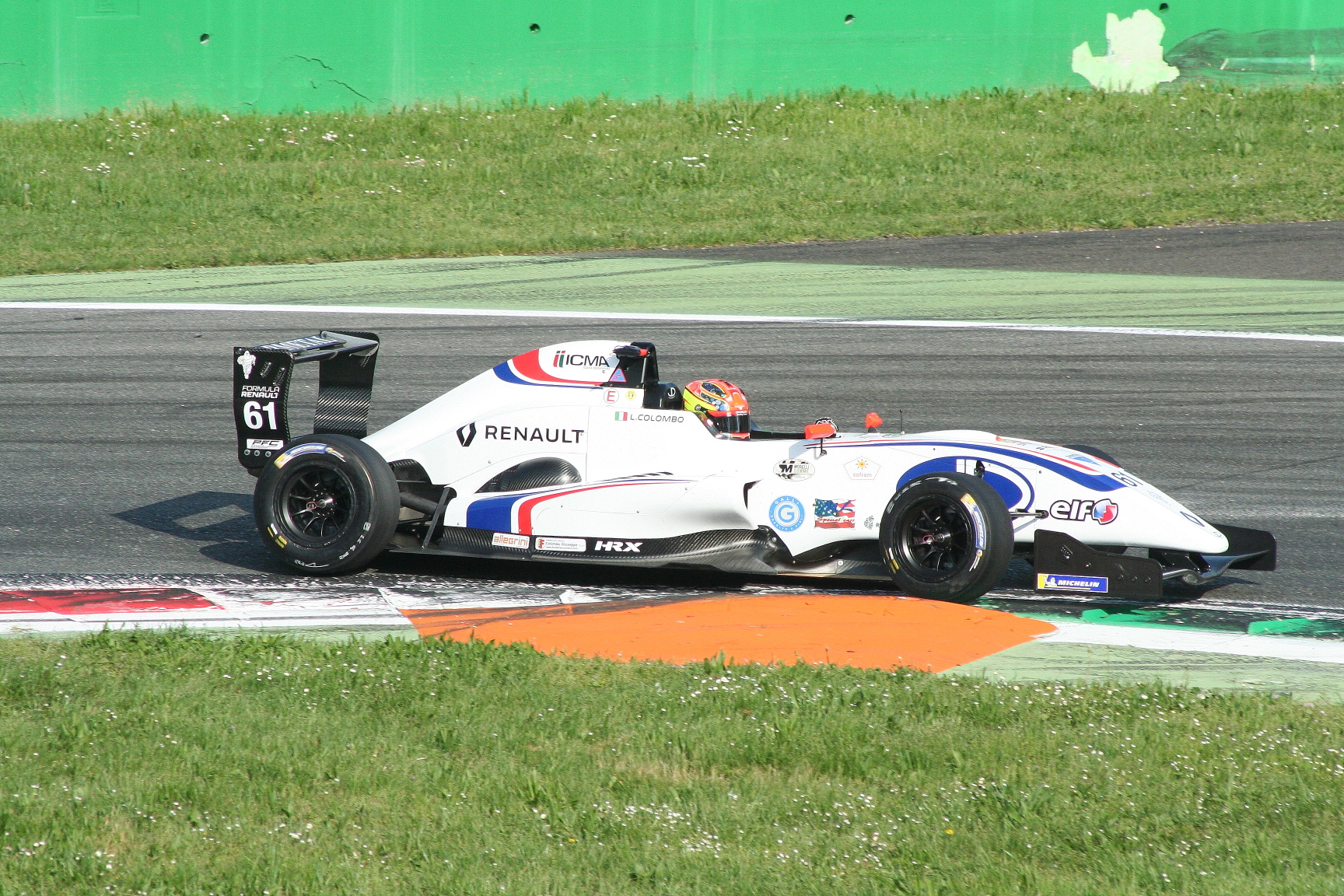
Colombo racing in the 2018 Formula Renault Eurocup

In 2018, Colombo made his debut in the Formula Renault Eurocup for JD Motorsport. He scored two pole positions and finished sixth in the standings.

==== 2019 ====
The year after, Colombo moved to MP Motorsport in his pursuit of winning the series. However, he didn't manage to do so, and with three race wins and 214.5 points he ended up fourth in the championship.

==== 2020 ====
In 2020, Colombo would switch to his former Formula 4 outfit, Bhaitech Racing. Despite missing the round in Spa due to a heavy nosebleed after a routine COVID-19 test, Colombo finished fifth in the drivers' standings, courtesy of a hattrick of victories in the final three races of the series' history.

=== FIA Formula 3 Championship ===
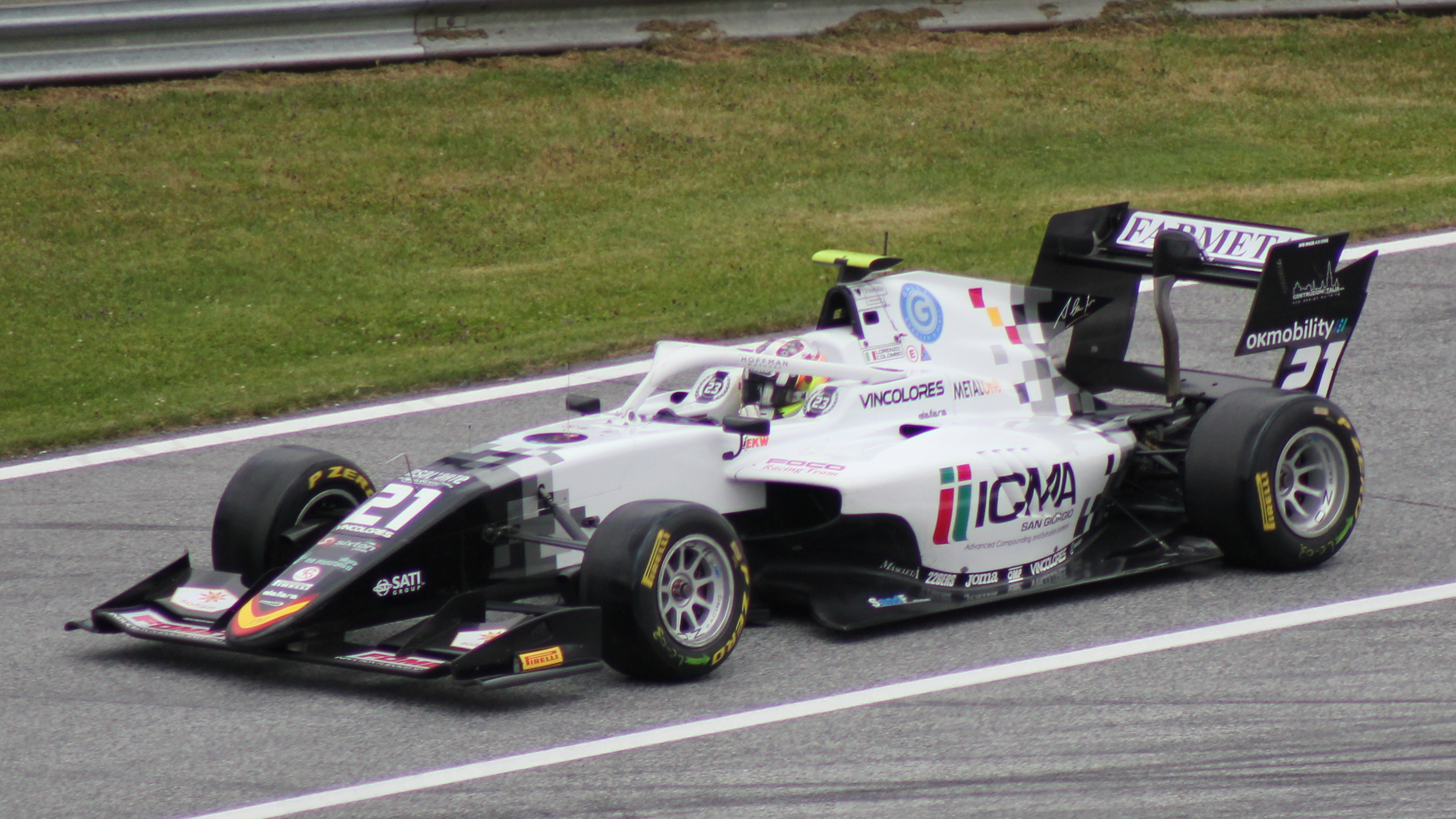
Colombo at the 2021 Spielberg Formula 3 round

Colombo progressed to the FIA Formula 3 Championship with Campos Racing, partnering László Tóth and Amaury Cordeel. His season started out relatively poorly, with no points finishes in the opening three rounds. At the fourth round in Budapest however Colombo managed to qualify the car in eleventh, putting him second on the grid for the first race thanks to the reversing of the top twelve in Qualifying. After maintaining position through the first seven laps, Colombo made a move on leader Jonny Edgar into the first corner, and as they were accelerating away, Edgar lost power and Colombo took the race lead. He would hold on to cross the finish line in first place, but he was stripped of victory by a five-second penalty he was given due to having driven more than ten car lengths behind the Safety Car prior to the car turning its lights out for the restart. He made amends by winning race 1 of the next round at Spa-Francorchamps. Colombo would score his final top-ten finish in the first race in Sochi, ending up sixth. He finished the championship in 15th, scoring all of Campos' 32 points.

== Sportscar racing ==
=== 2022 - First success in WEC and ELMS ===
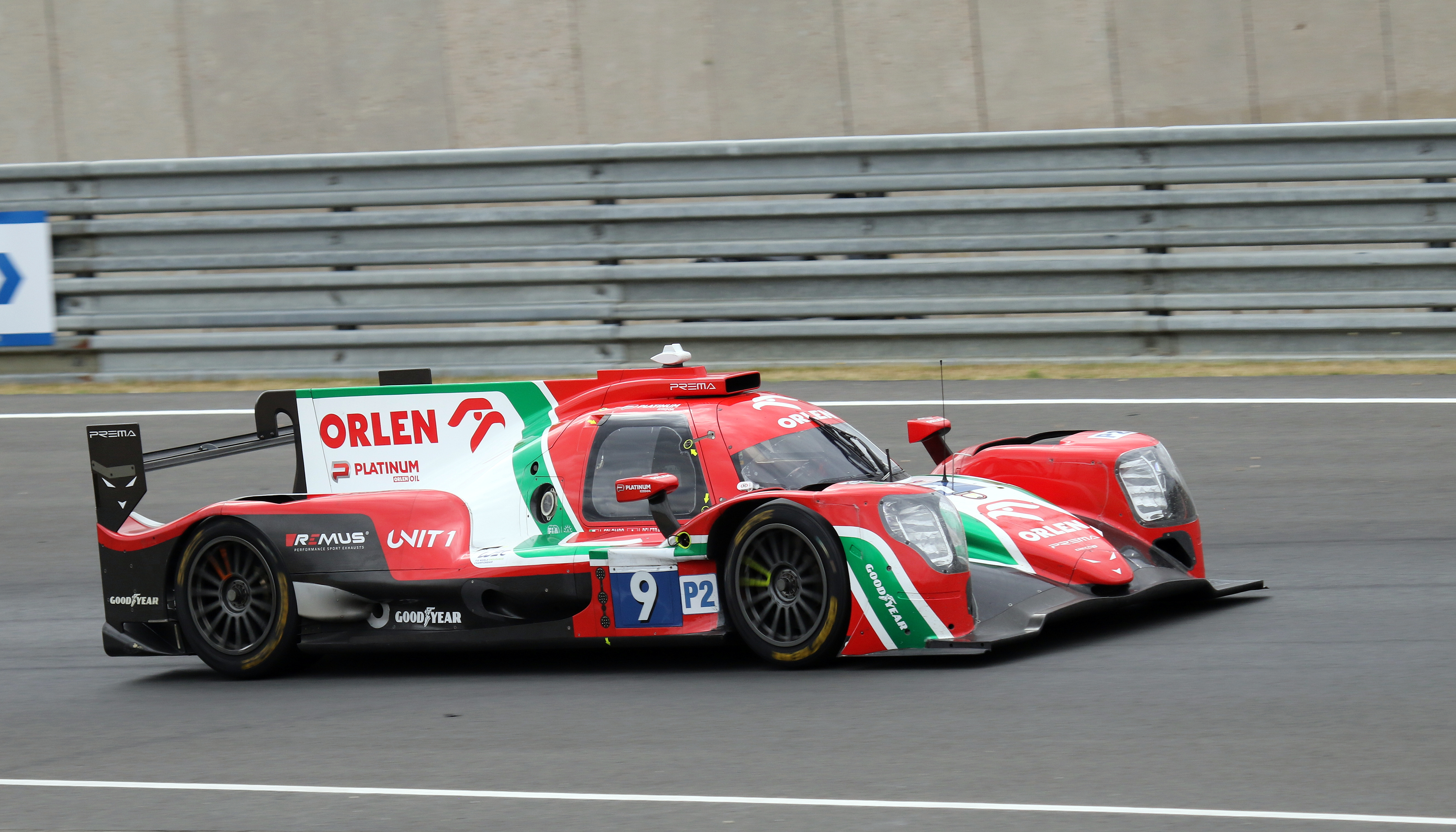
Colombo at the 2022 24 Hours of Le Mans

On 12 January 2022, it was announced that Colombo would be racing for Prema Orlen Team in the LMP2 class in the FIA World Endurance Championship, partnering Louis Delétraz and former Formula One race winner Robert Kubica. The highlight of the team's debut season in the category came at the 24 Hours of Le Mans, where they finished second in class, which helped Colombo and his teammates to fifth in the championship.

That season, Colombo would also replace the injured and otherwise occupied Juan Manuel Correa in the European Le Mans Series. His tenure there was a success, as a pair of victories in the opening two rounds was followed up by another win in Barcelona. Prema ended up winning the teams' championship, with Colombo finishing third in the drivers' standings despite missing the final two races.

As a prize for his performance in the 2022 season, Colombo was invited to take part in Rookie Test to be held in Bahrain on the day after the last race of the season, where he was given the opportunity to drive the title-winning Ferrari 488 GTE Evo in the GTE Pro class.

Colombo did not race in 2023.

== Karting record ==
=== Karting career summary ===
Season	Series	Team	Position
2009	Campeonato Area Centro — 60cc		10th
2010	Trofeo Nazionale Easykart — 60cc		8th
2010	Easykart International Grand Final — Easy 60	Foco Racing Team	NC
2011	Trofeo Nazionale Easykart — 60cc		4th
2011	Easykart International Grand Final — Easy 60		4th
2012	Trofeo Nazionale Easykart — 60cc		1st
2012	WSK Master Series — 60 Mini	Birel Motorsport	19th
2012	Italian Championship — 60 Mini		3rd
2012	WSK Final Cup — 60 Mini	Comer Top Kart	11th
2012	Easykart International Grand Final — Easy 60	Foco Racing Team	8th
2013	Andrea Margutti Trophy — 60 Mini		2nd
2013	WSK Euro Series — 60 Mini	Emilia Kart Srl	6th
2013	WSK Super Master Series — 60 Mini	Emilia Kart Srl	27th
2013	Italian Championship — 60 Mini		7th
2013	WSK Final Cup — KFJ	Baby Race Srl	NC
2014	South Garda Winter Cup — KFJ		18th
2014	WSK Champions Cup — KFJ	Baby Race Srl	NC
2014	WSK Super Master Series — KFJ	Baby Race Srl	55th
2014	Italian Championship — KF3	Baby Race Srl	15th
2014	CIK-FIA European Championship — KFJ	Baby Race Srl	42nd
2014	CIK-FIA World Championship — KFJ	Baby Race Srl	54th
2015	WSK Champions Cup — KFJ	Colombo, Giuseppe	14th
2015	South Garda Winter Cup — KFJ	Foco Racing Team	8th
2015	WSK Gold Cup — KFJ	Foco Racing Team	11th
2015	Andrea Margutti Trophy — KFJ	Foco Racing Team	2nd
2015	WSK Super Master Series — KFJ	Foco Racing Team	9th
2015	WSK Night Edition — KFJ	Foco Racing Team	9th
2015	Italian Championship — KFJ		2nd
2015	Trofeo Industrie — KFJ		5th
2015	CIK-FIA World Championship — KFJ	Baby Race Srl	23rd

== Racing record ==
=== Racing career summary ===
Season	Series	Team	Races	Wins	Poles	F/Laps	Podiums	Points	Position
2016	Italian F4 Championship	BVM Racing	12	0	0	0	0	73.5	12th
2016	Italian F4 Championship	Bhaitech Engineering	9	0	0	0	1	73.5	12th
2017	Italian F4 Championship	Bhaitech	21	2	6	3	8	223	**3rd**
2017	ADAC Formula 4 Championship	Bhaitech	3	0	0	0	0	0	NC†
2017	Euroformula Open Championship	Campos Racing	2	0	0	0	0	0	NC†
2018	Formula Renault Eurocup	JD Motorsport	20	0	2	0	5	152.5	6th
2018	Formula Renault NEC	JD Motorsport	2	0	0	0	1	35	12th‡
2018	Italian F4 Championship	R-ace GP	3	0	0	0	0	3	25th
2019	Formula Renault Eurocup	MP Motorsport	20	3	3	2	7	214.5	4th
2020	Formula Renault Eurocup	Bhaitech Racing	18	3	4	2	5	170	5th
2021	FIA Formula 3 Championship	Campos Racing	20	1	0	2	1	32	15th
2022	FIA World Endurance Championship - LMP2	Prema Orlen Team	6	0	0	1	1	94	5th
2022	24 Hours of Le Mans - LMP2	Prema Orlen Team	1	0	0	0	1	N/A	**2nd**
2022	European Le Mans Series - LMP2	Prema Racing	4	3	0	1	3	85	**3rd**

^{†} As Colombo was a guest driver, he was ineligible for points.
^{‡} Colombo was ineligible for points from the third round onwards.
^{*} Season still in progress.

=== Complete Italian F4 Championship results ===
(key) (Races in bold indicate pole position) (Races in italics indicate fastest lap)

Year	Team	1	2	3	4	5	6	7	8	9	10	11	12	13	14	15	16	17	18	19	20	21	22	23	Pos	Points
2016	BVM Racing	MIS; 1	MIS; 2; 17	MIS; 3; 14	MIS; 4 Ret	ADR; 1; 9	ADR; 2; 12	ADR; 3	ADR; 4; 15	IMO1; 1; 5	IMO1; 2; 5	IMO1; 3; 8	MUG; 1; 20	MUG; 2; 22	MUG; 3; 19										12th	73.5
2016	Bhaitech Engineering															VLL; 1; 13	VLL; 2; 19	VLL; 3; 13	IMO2; 1; 4	IMO2; 2; 2	IMO2; 3; 6	MNZ; 1; 4	MNZ; 2; 22	MNZ; 3; 7	12th	73.5
2017	Bhaitech	MIS; 1; 4	MIS; 2; 2	**MIS**; **3**; 2	**ADR**; **1**; 2	**ADR**; **2** Ret	**ADR**; **3**; 1	VLL; 1 Ret	VLL; 2; 6	VLL; 3; 5	MUG1; 1; 3	MUG1; 2; 7	MUG1; 3; 3	IMO; 1; 5	IMO; 2; 5	IMO; 3; 10	MUG2; 1; 3	MUG2; 2 Ret	MUG2; 3; 7	MNZ; 1; 5	**MNZ**; **2**; 6	**MNZ**; **3**; 1			3rd	223
2018	R-ace GP	ADR; 1	ADR; 2	ADR; 3	LEC; 1	LEC; 2	LEC; 3	MNZ; 1	MNZ; 2	MNZ; 3	MIS; 1	MIS; 2	MIS; 3	IMO; 1	IMO; 2	IMO; 3	VLL; 1	VLL; 2	VLL; 3	MUG; 1; 14	MUG; 2; 9	MUG; 3; 10			25th	3

=== Complete Formula Renault Eurocup results ===
(key) (Races in bold indicate pole position) (Races in italics indicate fastest lap)

Year	Team	1	2	3	4	5	6	7	8	9	10	11	12	13	14	15	16	17	18	19	20	Pos	Points
2018	JD Motorsport	LEC; 1; 4	LEC; 2; 21	MNZ; 1; 3	**MNZ**; **2**; 2	SIL; 1; 4	SIL; 2; 8	MON; 1; 12	MON; 2 Ret	RBR; 1; 3	RBR; 2; 6	**SPA**; **1**; 6	SPA; 2; 5	HUN; 1; 6	HUN; 2; 3	NÜR; 1; 11	NÜR; 2; 22	HOC; 1 Ret	HOC; 2; 4	CAT; 1; 3	CAT; 2; 6	6th	152.5
2019	MP Motorsport	**MNZ**; **1** Ret	MNZ; 2; 3	SIL; 1; 6	SIL; 2; 5	MON; 1; 6	MON; 2; 7	**LEC**; **1**; 1	**LEC**; **2**; 1	SPA; 1; 4	SPA; 2; 1	NÜR; 1 Ret	NÜR; 2; 7	HUN; 1; 3	HUN; 2; 6	CAT; 1; 7	CAT; 2; 4	HOC; 1; 13	HOC; 2; 6	YMC; 1; 3	YMC; 2; 2	4th	214.5
2020	Bhaitech Racing	MNZ; 1; 13	MNZ; 2 Ret	IMO; 1; 7	IMO; 2; 11	NÜR; 1; 2	NÜR; 2; 5	MAG; 1; 6	MAG; 2; 4	ZAN; 1; 9	ZAN; 2; 5	CAT; 1; 14	CAT; 2; 9	SPA; 1 WD	SPA; 2 WD	**IMO**; **1**; 3	IMO; 2; 11	HOC; 1; 5	**HOC**; **2**; 1	**LEC**; **1**; 1	**LEC**; **2**; 1	5th	170

=== Complete Formula Renault NEC results ===
(key) (Races in bold indicate pole position) (Races in italics indicate fastest lap)

Year	Entrant	1	2	3	4	5	6	7	8	9	10	11	12	DC	Points
2018	JD Motorsport	PAU; 1	PAU; 2	MNZ; 1; 6	MNZ; 2; 3	SPA; 1; 6	SPA; 2; 5	HUN; 1; 6	HUN; 2; 3	NÜR; 1; 11	NÜR; 2; 22	HOC; 1 Ret	HOC; 2; 4	12th	35

=== Complete FIA Formula 3 Championship results ===
(key) (Races in bold indicate pole position; races in italics indicate points for the fastest lap of top ten finishers)

Year	Entrant	1	2	3	4	5	6	7	8	9	10	11	12	13	14	15	16	17	18	19	20	21	DC	Points
2021	Campos Racing	CAT; 1; 23	CAT; 2; 22	CAT; 3; 29	LEC; 1; 14	LEC; 2; 20	LEC; 3; 19	RBR; 1; 25	RBR; 2; 19	RBR; 3; 13	HUN; 1; 7	HUN; 2; 7	HUN; 3; 11	SPA; 1; 1	SPA; 2; 14	SPA; 3; 14	ZAN; 1; 13	ZAN; 2 Ret	ZAN; 3; 17	SOC; 1; 6	SOC; 2 C	SOC; 3 Ret	15th	32

=== Complete FIA World Endurance Championship results ===
(key) (Races in bold indicate pole position) (Races in italics indicate fastest lap)

Year	Entrant	Class	Chassis	Engine	1	2	3	4	5	6	Rank	Points
2022	Prema Orlen Team	LMP2	Oreca 07	Gibson GK428 4.2 L V8	SEB; 4	SPA; 7	LMS; 2	MNZ; 6	FUJ; 6	BHR; 4	5th	94

^{*} Season still in progress.

=== Complete European Le Mans Series results ===
(key) (Races in bold indicate pole position; results in italics indicate fastest lap)

Year	Entrant	Class	Chassis	Engine	1	2	3	4	5	6	Rank	Points
2022	Prema Racing	LMP2	Oreca 07	Gibson GK428 4.2 L V8	LEC; 1	IMO; 1	MNZ; 5	CAT; 1	SPA	ALG	3rd	85

=== Complete 24 Hours of Le Mans results ===
Year	Team	Co-Drivers	Car	Class	Laps	Pos.	Class Pos.
2022	(Italy) Prema Orlen Team	(Switzerland) Louis Delétraz (Poland) Robert Kubica	Oreca 07-Gibson	LMP2	369	6th	**2nd**
