= 2017 Italian F4 Championship =

Motor racing competition in Italy

The 2017 Italian F4 Championship Powered by Abarth was the fourth season of the Italian F4 Championship. It began on 2 April at Misano and finished on 22 October at Autodromo Nazionale di Monza after seven triple header rounds.

The championship title was clinched by and Prema Powerteam driver and Ferrari Driver Academy protegé Marcus Armstrong. Job van Uitert, Lorenzo Colombo, Sebastián Fernández and Artem Petrov were the other drivers who won more than one race, all of them completed the top-five in the driver standings. Leonardo Lorandi won the rookies' championship. Sophia Flörsch was the only woman to compete in the series, but because she did not compete in at least five events, the Woman trophy wasn't given.

== Teams and drivers ==
On 11 March 2017 was announced that 14 teams and more than 30 drivers were scheduled to compete in the 2017 season.

Team	No.	Driver	Class	Rounds
(Netherlands) Van Amersfoort Racing	3	(United Kingdom) Louis Gachot		1, 3
(Netherlands) Van Amersfoort Racing	80	(Brazil) Felipe Drugovich	G	1
(Netherlands) Van Amersfoort Racing	80	(Brazil) Felipe Drugovich		3
(Netherlands) Van Amersfoort Racing	83	(Canada) Kami Moreira-Laliberté	G	1
(Germany) BWT Mücke Motorsport	4	(Germany) Sophia Flörsch	W	1–3
(Germany) BWT Mücke Motorsport	5	(Germany) Lirim Zendeli		1–6
(Germany) BWT Mücke Motorsport	8	(Sweden) Oliver Söderström		1
(Germany) BWT Mücke Motorsport	64	(United Kingdom) Olli Caldwell		3–7
(Italy) Bhaitech	6	(Italy) Lorenzo Colombo		All
(Italy) Bhaitech	7	(Venezuela) Sebastián Fernández		All
(Italy) Bhaitech	11	(Italy) Leonardo Lorandi	R	All
(Italy) Prema Powerteam	9	(New Zealand) Marcus Armstrong		All
(Italy) Prema Powerteam	44	(Estonia) Jüri Vips		1, 4–5
(Italy) Prema Powerteam	68	(United States) Juan Manuel Correa		1, 4
(Italy) Prema Powerteam	74	(Brazil) Enzo Fittipaldi	R	All
(Italy) Prema Powerteam	77	(Austria) Lukas Dunner		6
(Switzerland) Jenzer Motorsport	15	(India) Kush Maini		All
(Switzerland) Jenzer Motorsport	16	(Netherlands) Job van Uitert		All
(Switzerland) Jenzer Motorsport	17	(Switzerland) Grégoire Saucy		5–6
(Switzerland) Jenzer Motorsport	18	(Argentina) Giorgio Carrara	R	All
(Switzerland) Jenzer Motorsport	19	(Switzerland) Giacomo Bianchi		All
(Switzerland) Jenzer Motorsport	27	(Italy) Federico Malvestiti		All
(Italy) ADM Motorsport	22	(Germany) Andreas Estner		3
(Italy) ADM Motorsport	23	(Italy) Diego Bertonelli		3
(Italy) ADM Motorsport	46	(Brazil) Mauro Auricchio		1
(Italy) Henry Morrogh Racing D.S.	24	(Italy) Andrea Dall'Accio	R	1–5
(Italy) Cram Motorsport	24	(Italy) Andrea Dall'Accio	R	6–7
(Italy) Cram Motorsport	36	(Italy) Mariano Lavigna	R	1
(Italy) Cram Motorsport	87	(Italy) Christian Cobellini		3
(Italy) Cram Motorsport	88	(Netherlands) Leonard Hoogenboom		1, 3
(Italy) Cram Motorsport	89	(Czech Republic) Tom Beckhäuser		3–7
(Italy) Corbetta Competizioni	26	(Switzerland) Mickael Grosso	R	2–4
(Italy) Corbetta Competizioni	82	(Italy) Davide Venditti	R	7
(Italy) BDL Motorsport	28	(France) Alessandro Ghiretti	R	1–2
(Italy) Diegi Motorsport	33	(Uruguay) Facundo Garese		7
(Italy) Diegi Motorsport	82	(Italy) Davide Venditti	R	1–6
(Portugal) DR Formula	42	(Russia) Artem Petrov		All
(Portugal) DR Formula	51	(Italy) Aldo Festante		1–4, 6
(Portugal) DR Formula	55	(Brazil) Felipe Branquinho	R	All
(Italy) DRZ Benelli	45	(Guatemala) Ian Rodríguez		All
(Italy) Vigo GP-BU	78	(Italy) Federico Casoli		7

Icon	Class
R	Rookie Trophy
W	Woman Trophy
G	Guest drivers ineligible to score points

== Race calendar ==
The calendar was published on 29 October 2016. All rounds were held in Italy.

Round		Circuit	Date	Pole position	Fastest lap	Winning driver	Winning team	Secondary Class winner
1	R1	Misano World Circuit Marco Simoncelli, Misano Adriatico	2 April	(Venezuela) Sebastián Fernández	(Venezuela) Sebastián Fernández	(Venezuela) Sebastián Fernández	(Italy) Bhaitech	R: (Italy) Leonardo Lorandi; W: (Germany) Sophia Flörsch
1	R2	Misano World Circuit Marco Simoncelli, Misano Adriatico	3 April	(Venezuela) Sebastián Fernández	(Italy) Lorenzo Colombo	(Venezuela) Sebastián Fernández	(Italy) Bhaitech	R: (Brazil) Enzo Fittipaldi; W: (Germany) Sophia Flörsch
1	R3	Misano World Circuit Marco Simoncelli, Misano Adriatico	3 April	(Italy) Lorenzo Colombo	(Italy) Lorenzo Colombo	(Venezuela) Sebastián Fernández	(Italy) Bhaitech	R: (Brazil) Enzo Fittipaldi; W: no finishers
2	R1	Adria International Raceway, Adria	6 May	(Italy) Lorenzo Colombo	(Netherlands) Job van Uitert	(Netherlands) Job van Uitert	(Switzerland) Jenzer Motorsport	R: (Italy) Leonardo Lorandi; W: (Germany) Sophia Flörsch
2	R2	Adria International Raceway, Adria	7 May	(Italy) Lorenzo Colombo	(Brazil) Enzo Fittipaldi	(Italy) Leonardo Lorandi	(Italy) Bhaitech	R: (Italy) Leonardo Lorandi; W: (Germany) Sophia Flörsch
2	R3	Adria International Raceway, Adria	7 May	(Italy) Lorenzo Colombo	(Italy) Leonardo Lorandi	(Italy) Lorenzo Colombo	(Italy) Bhaitech	R: (Italy) Leonardo Lorandi; W: (Germany) Sophia Flörsch
3	R1	Vallelunga Circuit, Campagnano di Roma	24 June	(Russia) Artem Petrov	(Italy) Leonardo Lorandi	(Guatemala) Ian Rodríguez	(Italy) DRZ Benelli	R: (Italy) Leonardo Lorandi; W: no finishers
3	R2	Vallelunga Circuit, Campagnano di Roma	25 June	(New Zealand) Marcus Armstrong	(Russia) Artem Petrov	(New Zealand) Marcus Armstrong	(Italy) Prema Powerteam	R: (Italy) Leonardo Lorandi; W: (Germany) Sophia Flörsch
3	R3	Vallelunga Circuit, Campagnano di Roma	25 June	(Italy) Aldo Festante	(Brazil) Felipe Drugovich	(Brazil) Felipe Drugovich	(Netherlands) Van Amersfoort Racing	R: (Italy) Leonardo Lorandi; W: (Germany) Sophia Flörsch
4	R1	Mugello Circuit, Scarperia e San Piero	15 July	(New Zealand) Marcus Armstrong	(Italy) Lorenzo Colombo	(New Zealand) Marcus Armstrong	(Italy) Prema Powerteam	R: (Italy) Leonardo Lorandi; W: no entrants
4	R2	Mugello Circuit, Scarperia e San Piero	16 July	(Estonia) Jüri Vips	(Russia) Artem Petrov	(Estonia) Jüri Vips	(Italy) Prema Powerteam	R: (Italy) Leonardo Lorandi; W: no entrants
4	R3	Mugello Circuit, Scarperia e San Piero	16 July	(Estonia) Jüri Vips	(Netherlands) Job van Uitert	(Netherlands) Job van Uitert	(Switzerland) Jenzer Motorsport	R: (Italy) Leonardo Lorandi; W: no entrants
5	R1	Autodromo Enzo e Dino Ferrari, Imola	9 September	(New Zealand) Marcus Armstrong	(Netherlands) Job van Uitert	(New Zealand) Marcus Armstrong	(Italy) Prema Powerteam	R: (Italy) Leonardo Lorandi; W: no entrants
5	R2	Autodromo Enzo e Dino Ferrari, Imola	10 September	(Netherlands) Job van Uitert	(Estonia) Jüri Vips	(Netherlands) Job van Uitert	(Switzerland) Jenzer Motorsport	R: (Italy) Leonardo Lorandi; W: no entrants
5	R3	Autodromo Enzo e Dino Ferrari, Imola	10 September	(Netherlands) Job van Uitert	(Estonia) Jüri Vips	(Netherlands) Job van Uitert	(Switzerland) Jenzer Motorsport	R: (Italy) Leonardo Lorandi; W: no entrants
6	R1	Mugello Circuit, Scarperia e San Piero	7 October	(Venezuela) Sebastián Fernández	(Venezuela) Sebastián Fernández	(Venezuela) Sebastián Fernández	(Italy) Bhaitech	R: (Italy) Leonardo Lorandi; W: no entrants
6	R2	Mugello Circuit, Scarperia e San Piero	8 October	(New Zealand) Marcus Armstrong	(Germany) Lirim Zendeli	(New Zealand) Marcus Armstrong	(Italy) Prema Powerteam	R: (Italy) Leonardo Lorandi; W: no entrants
6	R3	Mugello Circuit, Scarperia e San Piero	8 October	(New Zealand) Marcus Armstrong	(Russia) Artem Petrov	(Venezuela) Sebastián Fernández	(Italy) Bhaitech	R: (Italy) Leonardo Lorandi; W: no entrants
7	R1	Autodromo Nazionale di Monza, Monza	21 October	(New Zealand) Marcus Armstrong	(Russia) Artem Petrov	(Russia) Artem Petrov	(Portugal) DR Formula	R: (Italy) Leonardo Lorandi; W: no entrants
7	R2	Autodromo Nazionale di Monza, Monza	22 October	(Italy) Lorenzo Colombo	(Russia) Artem Petrov	(Russia) Artem Petrov	(Portugal) DR Formula	R: (Italy) Leonardo Lorandi; W: no entrants
7	R3	Autodromo Nazionale di Monza, Monza	22 October	(Italy) Lorenzo Colombo	(Netherlands) Job van Uitert	(Italy) Lorenzo Colombo	(Italy) Bhaitech	R: (Italy) Leonardo Lorandi; W: no entrants

== Championship standings ==
Points were awarded to the top 10 classified finishers in each race. No points were awarded for pole position or fastest lap. Only the best sixteen results were counted towards the championship. To be able to compete in the main classification, drivers were obliged to compete in at least five rounds, one of these rounds should be the finale in Monza.

Position	**1st**	**2nd**	**3rd**	**4th**	**5th**	**6th**	**7th**	**8th**	**9th**	**10th**
Points	25	18	15	12	10	8	6	4	2	1

=== Drivers' standings ===
Pos	Driver	MIS			ADR			VLL			MUG1			IMO			MUG2			MNZ			Pts
1	(New Zealand) Marcus Armstrong	5	3	23	3	Ret	3	2	**1**	4	**1**	2	8	**1**	4	3	2	**1**	**3**	**2**	4	10	283
2	(Netherlands) Job van Uitert	6	7	6	1	2	2	5	Ret	Ret	Ret	Ret	1	2	**1**	**1**	8	2	15	3	2	Ret	247
3	(Italy) Lorenzo Colombo	4	2	**2**	**2**	**Ret**	**1**	Ret	6	5	3	7	3	5	5	10	3	Ret	7	5	**6**	**1**	223
4	(Venezuela) Sebastián Fernández	**1**	**1**	1	14	5	Ret	Ret	5	11	Ret	6	4	7	16	5	**1**	16	1	7	5	11	197
5	(Russia) Artem Petrov	2	Ret	3	Ret	6	19	**3**	2	2	12	3	7	10	9	20	6	Ret	2	1	1	Ret	192
6	(Italy) Leonardo Lorandi	9	14	19	5	1	6	6	10	7	4	4	5	8	7	2	4	3	4	8	3	4	185
7	(Guatemala) Ian Rodríguez	7	18	7	8	10	8	1	8	6	16	10	9	6	8	19	12	5	Ret	4	13	2	115
8	(India) Kush Maini	Ret	11	24	4	8	7	7	9	15	5	18	Ret	4	3	9	9	4	18	6	7	3	114
9	(Brazil) Enzo Fittipaldi	11	8	5	6	7	11	Ret	12	14	6	Ret	6	Ret	12	7	5	DSQ	5	9	Ret	5	89
10	(Italy) Federico Malvestiti	14	Ret	11	11	11	10	16	16	18	10	Ret	10	Ret	13	8	14	Ret	11	Ret	8	7	19
11	(United Kingdom) Olli Caldwell							18	14	13	11	13	11	Ret	19	14	21	10	10	11	15	6	10
12	(Switzerland) Giacomo Bianchi	13	12	12	10	16	14	11	18	16	13	14	16	9	10	17	13	15	13	10	10	Ret	8
13	(Brazil) Felipe Branquinho	20	16	Ret	13	13	9	13	17	23	14	11	Ret	13	14	12	16	8	14	Ret	11	Ret	6
14	(Argentina) Giorgio Carrara	16	20	21	9	12	13	15	15	17	15	12	Ret	11	11	11	15	12	9	Ret	9	Ret	6
15	(Italy) Davide Venditti	Ret	23	14	17	17	16	21	23	Ret	20	15	13	Ret	20	18	20	Ret	DNS	13	18	8	4
16	(Czech Republic) Tom Beckhäuser							19	24	21	19	17	14	14	17	15	18	11	16	14	12	Ret	0
17	(Italy) Andrea Dell'Accio	19	24	13	18	14	18	17	22	20	18	Ret	15	15	18	16	19	14	19	Ret	17	12	0
Drivers ineligible to take position in the championship
NC	(Estonia) Jüri Vips	3	4	Ret							2	**1**	**2**	Ret	2	6							114
NC	(Germany) Lirim Zendeli	21	9	8	12	3	5	8	Ret	9	7	5	12	3	6	4	7	6	8				114
NC	(Italy) Aldo Festante	12	15	10	19	4	12	Ret	4	**3**	8	9	17				11	13	6				57
NC	(Brazil) Felipe Drugovich	23	6	4				4	3	1													52
NC	(Germany) Sophia Flörsch	18	21	Ret	7	9	4	Ret	7	8													28
NC	(United States) Juan Manuel Correa	Ret	10	20							9	8	18										10
NC	(Switzerland) Grégoire Saucy													12	15	13	10	7	12				7
NC	(Netherlands) Leonard Hoogenboom	8	25	18				10	11	Ret													5
NC	(Italy) Diego Bertonelli							9	13	12													2
NC	(Italy) Federico Casoli																			12	16	9	2
NC	(Austria) Lukas Dunner																17	9	17				2
NC	(United Kingdom) Louis Gachot	22	17	15				Ret	Ret	10													1
NC	(Canada) Kami Moreira-Laliberté	10	5	9																			0
NC	(Germany) Andreas Estner							12	20	Ret													0
NC	(Uruguay) Facundo Garese																			15	14	13	0
NC	(Sweden) Oliver Söderström	15	13	16																			0
NC	(Switzerland) Mickael Grosso				16	15	15	14	19	22	17	16	Ret										0
NC	(France) Alessandro Ghiretti	17	22	22	15	18	17																0
NC	(Italy) Mariano Lavigna	Ret	19	17																			0
NC	(Italy) Christian Cobellini							20	21	19													0
NC	(Brazil) Mauro Auricchio	WD	WD	WD																			0
Pos	Driver	MIS			ADR			VLL			MUG1			IMO			MUG2			MNZ			Pts

Colour	Result
Gold	Winner
Silver	Second place
Bronze	Third place
Green	Points classification
Blue	Non-points classification
Blue	Non-classified finish (NC)
Purple	Retired, not classified (Ret)
Red	Did not qualify (DNQ)
Red	Did not pre-qualify (DNPQ)
Black	Disqualified (DSQ)
White	Did not start (DNS)
White	Withdrew (WD)
White	Race cancelled (C)
Blank	Did not practice (DNP)
Blank	Did not arrive (DNA)
Blank	Excluded (EX)

**Bold** – Pole
Italics – Fastest Lap

=== Secondary championship's standings ===
Pos	Driver	MIS			ADR			VLL			MUG1			IMO			MUG2			MNZ			Pts
Rookies' championship
1	(Italy) Leonardo Lorandi	9	14	19	5	1	6	6	10	7	4	4	5	8	7	2	4	3	4	8	3	4	400
2	(Brazil) Enzo Fittipaldi	11	8	5	6	7	11	Ret	12	14	6	Ret	6	Ret	12	7	5	DSQ	5	9	Ret	5	293
3	(Argentina) Giorgio Carrara	16	20	21	9	12	13	15	15	17	15	12	Ret	11	11	11	15	13	9	Ret	9	Ret	227
4	(Brazil) Felipe Branquinho	20	16	Ret	13	13	9	13	17	23	14	11	Ret	13	14	12	16	8	14	Ret	11	Ret	217
5	(United Kingdom) Olli Caldwell							18	14	13	11	13	11	Ret	19	14	21	11	10	11	15	6	172
6	(Italy) Andrea Dell'Accio	19	24	13	18	14	18	17	22	20	18	Ret	15	15	18	16	19	15	19	Ret	17	12	142
7	(Italy) Davide Venditti	Ret	23	14	17	17	16	21	23	Ret	20	15	13	Ret	20	18	20	Ret	DNS	13	18	8	115
8	(Czech Republic) Tom Beckhäuser							19	24	21	19	17	14	14	17	15	18	12	16	14	12	Ret	113
Drivers ineligible to take position in the championship
NC	(Switzerland) Mickael Grosso				16	15	15	14	19	22	17	16	Ret										69
NC	(France) Alessandro Ghiretti	17	22	22	15	18	17																46
NC	(Italy) Mariano Lavigna	Ret	19	17																			24
NC	(Italy) Christian Cobellini							20	21	19													22
Woman trophy
NC	(Germany) Sophia Flörsch	18	21	Ret	7	9	4	Ret	7	8													200
Pos	Driver	MIS			ADR			VLL			MUG1			IMO			MUG2			MNZ			Pts

=== Teams' championship ===
Pos	Team	Points
1	(Italy) Bhaitech	565
2	(Italy) Prema Powerteam	476
3	(Switzerland) Jenzer Motorsport	368
4	(Portugal) DR Formula	255
5	(Germany) BWT Mücke Motorsport	152
6	(Italy) DRZ Benelli	115
7	(Italy) Cram Motorsport	5
Teams ineligible for place in the classification
NC	(Netherlands) Van Amersfoort Racing	53
NC	(Italy) Corbetta Competizioni	4
NC	(Italy) Kite Viola Motorsport GP	2
NC	(Italy) ADM Motorsport	2
-	(Italy) BDL Motorsport	0
-	(Italy) Henry Morrogh Racing D.S.	0
-	(Italy) Diegi Motorsport	0
