= Bhaitech =

Italian automotive R&D team

(Italy) Bhaitech Racing
- Founded: 2011
- Folded: 2021
- Base: Mestrino, Veneto, Italy
- Former series: Italian F4 Championship; Italian GT Championship; International GT Open; Blancpain Sprint Series; Formula Renault Eurocup
- Teams' Championships: International GT Open GTS class: 2013; Italian F4 Championship: 2017
- Drivers' Championships: International GT Open GTS class: 2013: Giorgio Pantano
- Website: https://www.bhaitech.com/en/home/

Bhaitech Racing (sometimes stylised as BhaiTech Racing) was an Italian automotive research and development service provider and motorsport team.

== History ==
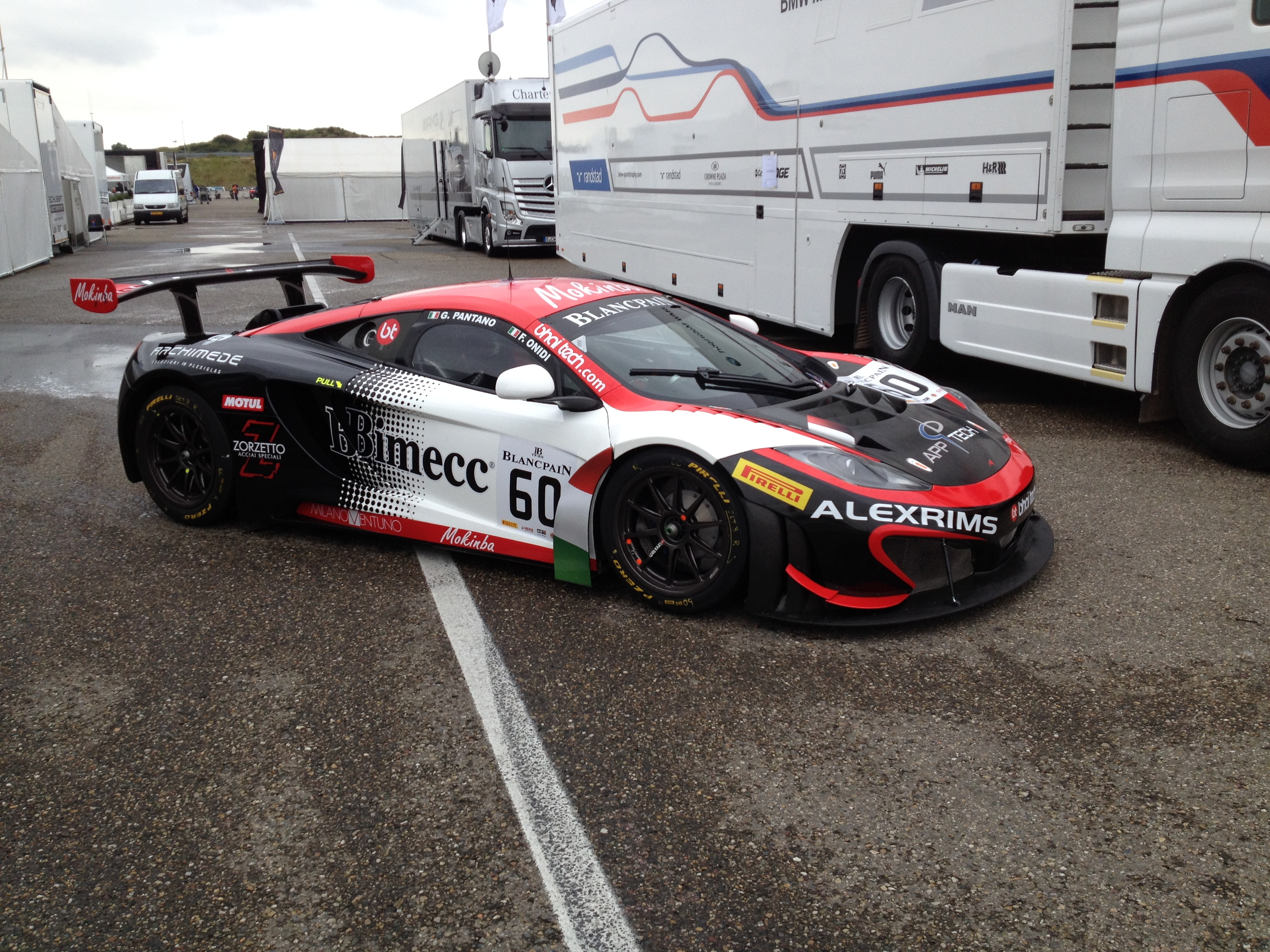
Bhaitech McLaren in 2014.

=== Racing ===
Bhaitech made its racing debut in 2012, contesting the Italian GT Championship using a McLaren 12C GT3. A year later, the team contested the International GT Open and clinched the GTS Teams' and Drivers' titles with Giorgio Pantano. In 2014, BhaiTech competed in the Blancpain Sprint Series which saw them finish seventh in the Cup category of the Teams' Championship.

After a year's sabbatical from motorsports, Bhaitech returned to racing in 2016, competing in the Italian F4 Championship, which saw them claim podium finishes with Richard Verschoor and Lorenzo Colombo. A year later, the team clinched the teams' title and the rookie championship with Leonardo Lorandi while Colombo and Sebastian Fernandez claimed third and fourth in the 2017 championship respectively. In 2018, the team claimed a second rookie championship title with Petr Ptáček, while Lorandi narrowly missed out on the title to Enzo Fittipaldi.

In November 2018, it was announced Bhaitech would expand into the Formula Renault Eurocup championship for 2019, reuniting with Ptáček and signing Italian F4 race winner Federico Malvestiti. In January 2019, Bhaitech made their first driver signings with Umberto Laganella, Michael Belov, Nicola Marinangeli and Matteo Nannini joining the outfit for the Italian F4 Championship.

=== Technology ===
Bhaitech also specialized in research and development in the automotive and motorsport fields. In 2018, Bhaitech entered into a strategic partnership with Altran Italia.

== Former series results ==
=== International GT open ===
Year	Car	No.	Drivers	Races	Wins	Poles	Fast laps	D.C.	T.C.	Points
2013	McLaren MP4-12C GT3	65	(Italy) Giorgio Pantano	16	3	?	?	1st	1st	93
2013	McLaren MP4-12C GT3	65	(Brazil) Rafael Suzuki	14	3	?	?	3rd†	1st	93
2013	McLaren MP4-12C GT3	65	(Portugal) Álvaro Parente	2	0	?	?	NC*	1st	93
2013	McLaren MP4-12C GT3	66	(New Zealand) Chris van der Drift	16	1	?	?	8th	1st	93
2013	McLaren MP4-12C GT3	66	(Brazil) Luiz Razia	16	1	?	?	8th	1st	93

* Guest driver ineligible for points

† Shared results with another team

=== Blancpain Sprint Series ===
Year	Car	No.	Drivers	Races	Wins	Poles	Fast laps	D.C.	T.C.	Points
2014	McLaren MP4-12C GT3	60	(Italy) Fabio Onidi	14	0	0	0	14th	7th	50
2014	McLaren MP4-12C GT3	60	(Italy) Giorgio Pantano	14	0	0	0	14th	7th	50
2014	McLaren MP4-12C GT3	61	(Estonia) Sten Pentus	12	0	0	0	25th	7th	50
2014	McLaren MP4-12C GT3	61	(United Kingdom) Daniel Lloyd	6	0	0	0	NC	7th	50
2014	McLaren MP4-12C GT3	61	(New Zealand) Chris van der Drift	6	0	0	0	20th†	7th	50
2014	McLaren MP4-12C GT3	61	(Czech Republic) Filip Salaquarda	2	0	0	0	19th†	7th	50
2014	McLaren MP4-12C GT3	61	(Portugal) Álvaro Parente	2	0	0	0	NC	7th	50

† Shared results with another team

=== ADAC Formula 4 ===
Year	Car	Drivers	Races	Wins	Poles	Fast laps	D.C.
2017	Tatuus F4-T014	(Italy) Lorenzo Colombo	3	0	0	0	NC*
2017	Tatuus F4-T014	(Venezuela) Sebastián Fernández	3	0	0	0	NC*

* Guest driver ineligible for points

=== Formula Renault Eurocup ===
Year	Car	Drivers	Races	Wins	Poles	Fast laps	D.C.	T.C.	Points
2019	Tatuus F3 T-318	(Czech Republic) Petr Ptáček	20	0	0	0	8th	6th	106
2019	Tatuus F3 T-318	(Italy) Federico Malvestiti	20	0	0	0	14th	6th	106
2020	Tatuus F3 T-318	(Italy) Lorenzo Colombo	16	3	4	2	5th	6th	186
2020	Tatuus F3 T-318	(Hungary) László Tóth	20	0	0	0	16th	6th	186
2020	Tatuus F3 T-318	(Italy) Vicky Piria	4	0	0	0	20th	6th	186
2020	Tatuus F3 T-318	(Italy) Nicola Marinangeli	16	0	0	0	21st	6th	186

=== Italian F4 Championship ===
Italian F4 Championship
Year	Car	Drivers	Races	Wins	Poles	Fast laps	D.C.	T.C.	Points
2016	Tatuus F4-T014	(Italy) Diego Bertonelli	15	0	0	2	11th†	5th	165
2016	Tatuus F4-T014	(Italy) Lorenzo Colombo	9	0	0	0	12th†	5th	165
2016	Tatuus F4-T014	(Netherlands) Richard Verschoor	3	0	0	0	21st	5th	165
2016	Tatuus F4-T014	(Italy) Giacomo Altoè	23	0	0	0	22nd	5th	165
2016	Tatuus F4-T014	(United Kingdom) Aaron di Comberti	3	0	0	0	46th	5th	165
2016	Tatuus F4-T014	(Spain) Antolín González	3	0	0	0	47th	5th	165
2017	Tatuus F4-T014	(Italy) Lorenzo Colombo	21	2	6	3	3rd	1st	565
2017	Tatuus F4-T014	(Venezuela) Sebastián Fernández	21	5	3	2	4th	1st	565
2017	Tatuus F4-T014	(Italy) Leonardo Lorandi	21	1	0	2	6th	1st	565
2018	Tatuus F4-T014	(Italy) Leonardo Lorandi	21	5	3	5	2nd	2nd	480
2018	Tatuus F4-T014	(Czech Republic) Petr Ptáček	21	0	0	4	5th	2nd	480
2018	Tatuus F4-T014	(Russia) Ilya Morozov	3	0	0	0	19th†	2nd	480
2018	Tatuus F4-T014	(Venezuela) Alessandro Famularo	21	0	0	0	22nd	2nd	480
2018	Tatuus F4-T014	(Venezuela) Anthony Famularo	12	0	0	0	29th	2nd	480
2019	Tatuus F4-T014	(Russia) Michael Belov	21	0	0	0	4th	4th	199
2019	Tatuus F4-T014	(Finland) Jesse Salmenautio	21	0	0	0	18th†	4th	199
2019	Tatuus F4-T014	(Italy) Umberto Laganella	18	0	0	0	19th	4th	199
2019	Tatuus F4-T014	(Italy) Nicola Marinangeli	21	0	0	0	29th	4th	199
2020	Tatuus F4-T014	(Finland) Jesse Salmenautio	21	0	0	0	14th	8th	77
2020	Tatuus F4-T014	(Czech Republic) Zdeněk Chovanec	15	0	0	0	17th	8th	77
2020	Tatuus F4-T014	(Denmark) Sebastian Øgaard	21	0	0	0	20th	8th	77
2020	Tatuus F4-T014	(United Kingdom) Dexter Patterson	21	0	0	0	22nd	8th	77
2020	Tatuus F4-T014	(Russia) Tikhon Kharitonov	6	0	0	0	43rd	8th	77

† Shared results with another team

== Timeline ==
Former series
Italian GT Championship	2012
International GT Open	2013
Blancpain Sprint Series	2014
ADAC Formula 4	2017
Italian Formula 4 Championship	2016–2020
Formula Renault Eurocup	2019–2020

Achievements
Preceded by Prema Powerteam	Italian F4 Teams' Champion; 2017	Succeeded by Prema Powerteam
