= Sebastián Fernández (racing driver) =

Venezuelan-Spanish racing driver

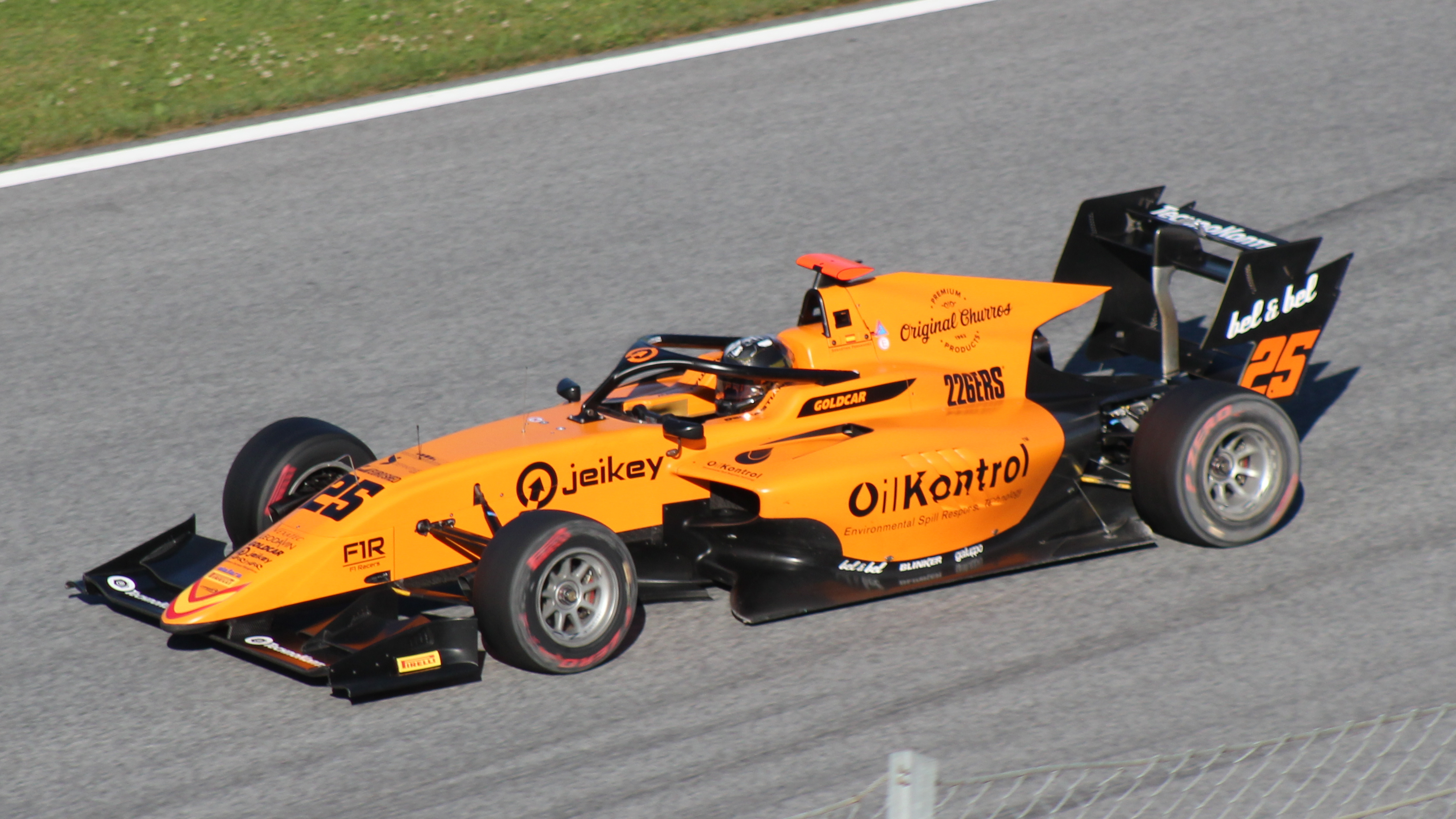
- Fernández driving the Dallara F3 2019 during the 2019 Spielberg Formula 3 round
- Nationality: (Venezuela) Venezuelan (Spain) Spanish via dual nationality
- Born: Sebastián Fernández Wahbeh; 12 July 2000 (age 26) Caracas, Venezuela

FIA Formula 3 Championship career
- Debut season: 2019
- Former teams: Campos Racing, ART Grand Prix
- Starts: 34 (34 entries)
- Wins: 0
- Podiums: 0
- Poles: 1
- Fastest laps: 0
- Best finish: 14th in 2020

Previous series
- 2019–20 2019 2018 2016–17 2016–17 2016–17 2016: F3 Asian Championship; Formula Renault Eurocup; FIA F3 European Championship; Italian F4 Championship; ADAC Formula 4 F4 UAE Championship; F4 Spanish Championship

Sebastián Fernández Wahbeh (born 12 July 2000 in Caracas) is a Venezuelan-Spanish racing driver who most recently competed in the Lamborghini Super Trofeo Europe for VS Racing. He previously competed in the 2019 FIA Formula 3 Championship for Campos Racing, and the 2020 FIA Formula 3 Championship with ART Grand Prix.

== Racing career ==
=== Lower formulae ===
Fernández spent his first two seasons in single-seaters in the Italian, German, Spanish and Emirati Formula 4 championships. He scored his first victory in the penultimate race of the 2016 Italian F4 Championship at Monza, while in 2017, he would win five races and finish fourth in the standings.

=== FIA Formula 3 European ===
2018 would see Fernández competing in the final season of the FIA Formula 3 European Championship for the Motopark team. Even though he had prior experience with the team, having driven for them in the 2016-17 Formula 4 UAE Championship, he would only manage to achieve two points finishes and would eventually come 21st in the driver's championship.

=== FIA Formula 3 Championship ===
Despite this, Fernández was signed by Campos Racing for the inaugural Formula 3 campaign. He would do even worse than in the season before and score no points, with a 12th place in Barcelona being his best result. He would finish 27th is the championship, the third lowest out of all drivers who competed in every event.

The ART Grand Prix team signed Fernández to partner Frenchman Théo Pourchaire and Russian Aleksandr Smolyar for the 2020 season. Fernández took pole position, his first in FIA Formula 3, at the opening round at the Red Bull Ring. However, he was eliminated from the race after a collision at the first turn.

== Karting record ==
=== Karting career summary ===
Season	Series	Team	Position
2009	Easykart Venezuela - Infantil 60 cc		6th
2010	Trofeo Italiano Easykart - Easykart 60		67th
2010	Easykart International Grand Final - Easykart 60	Easykart Venezuela	
2011	Florida Winter Tour - Rotax Micro Max		10th
2011	WSK Final Cup - 60 Mini		12th
2011	Easykart Venezuela - Infantil 60 cc		4th
2011	Easykart International Grand Final - Easykart 60		24th
2012	Andrea Margutti Trophy - 60 Junior Trophy	Birel Motorsport	11th
2012	WSK Master Series - 60 Mini		7th
2012	WSK Euro Series - 60 Mini	Baby Race	17th
2012	Easykart Venezuela - Junior 100 cc		
2012	WSK Final Cup - 60 Mini		5th
2013	Florida Winter Tour - MDD Formula TaG Junior		17th
2013	WSK Final Cup - KFJ	Gianni Giorgi	24th
2014	WSK Champions Cup - KFJ		14th
2014	CIK-FIA European Championship - KFJ	RB Kart Technology	23rd
2014	Andrea Margutti Trophy - KFJ		14th
2014	Italian Championship - KF3		8th
2015	WSK Champions Cup - KFJ		10th
2015	WSK Super Master Series - KFJ		39th
2015	WSK Night Edition - KFJ	RB Racing	7th
2015	CIK-FIA European Championship - KFJ		15th
2015	CIK-FIA World Championship - KFJ	Ricky Flynn Motorsport	5th

== Racing record ==
=== Racing career summary ===
Season	Series	Team	Races	Wins	Poles	F/Laps	Podiums	Points	Position
2016	Italian F4 Championship	RB Racing	18	0	0	0	0	55	15th
2016	Italian F4 Championship	Kfzteile24 Mücke Motorsport	3	1	2	1	1	55	15th
2016	ADAC Formula 4 Championship	RB Racing	3	0	0	0	0	4	25th
2016	ADAC Formula 4 Championship	KUG-Motorsport	3	0	0	0	0	4	25th
2016	F4 Spanish Championship	MP Motorsport	8	0	0	0	0	0	NC†
2016–17	Formula 4 UAE Championship	Team Motopark 2	7	1	0	0	2	65	10th
2017	Italian F4 Championship	Bhaitech Racing	21	5	3	2	5	197	4th
2017	ADAC Formula 4 Championship	Bhaitech Racing	3	0	0	0	0	0	NC†
2018	FIA Formula 3 European Championship	Motopark	30	0	0	0	0	5	21st
2019	FIA Formula 3 Championship	Campos Racing	16	0	0	0	0	0	27th
2019	Formula Renault Eurocup	Arden Motorsport	12	0	0	1	1	68	9th
2019	Macau Grand Prix	ART Grand Prix	1	0	0	0	0	N/A	15th
2019–20	F3 Asian Championship	Pinnacle Motorsport	6	1	1	1	3	96	8th
2020	FIA Formula 3 Championship	ART Grand Prix	18	0	1	0	0	31	14th
2020	Lamborghini Super Trofeo Europe	VS Racing	3	0	0	0	2	113	12th

^{†} As Fernández was a guest driver, he was ineligible for points.

=== Complete Italian F4 Championship results ===
(key) (Races in bold indicate pole position) (Races in italics indicate fastest lap)

Year	Team	1	2	3	4	5	6	7	8	9	10	11	12	13	14	15	16	17	18	19	20	21	22	23	Pos	Points
2016	RB Racing	MIS; 1 Ret	MIS; 2	MIS; 3; 9	MIS; 4; 16	ADR; 1; 19	ADR; 2	ADR; 3; 11	ADR; 4; 19	IMO1; 1; 22	IMO1; 2; 22	IMO1; 3; 29	MUG; 1; 12	MUG; 2; 6	MUG; 3; 6	VLL; 1 Ret	VLL; 2; 9	VLL; 3; 4	IMO2; 1; 14	IMO2; 2; 13	IMO2; 3; 26				15th	55
2016	Kfzteile24 Mücke Motorsport																					**MNZ**; **1**; 20	**MNZ**; **2**; 1	MNZ; 3; 5	15th	55
2017	Bhaitech	**MIS**; **1**; 1	**MIS**; **2**; 1	MIS; 3; 1	ADR; 1; 14	ADR; 2; 5	ADR; 3 Ret	VLL; 1 Ret	VLL; 2; 5	VLL; 3; 11	MUG1; 1 Ret	MUG1; 2; 6	MUG1; 3; 4	IMO; 1; 7	IMO; 2; 16	IMO; 3; 5	**MUG2**; **1**; 1	MUG2; 2; 16	MUG2; 3; 1	MNZ; 1; 7	MNZ; 2; 5	MNZ; 3; 11			4th	197

=== Complete Formula 4 UAE Championship results ===
(key) (Races in bold indicate pole position) (Races in italics indicate fastest lap)

Year	Team	1	2	3	4	5	6	7	8	9	10	11	12	13	14	15	16	17	18	Pos	Points
2016-17	Team Motopark	DUB1; 1	DUB1; 2	DUB1; 3	YMC1; 1	YMC1; 2	YMC1; 3	YMC1; 4	DUB2; 1; 2	DUB2; 2; 1	DUB2; 3; 7	YMC2; 1; 10	YMC2; 2; 10	YMC2; 3; 5	YMC2; 4; 4	YMC3; 1	YMC3; 2	YMC3; 3	YMC3; 4	10th	65

=== Complete FIA Formula 3 European Championship results ===
(key) (Races in bold indicate pole position) (Races in italics indicate fastest lap)

Year	Team	Engine	1	2	3	4	5	6	7	8	9	10	11	12	13	14	15	16	17	18	19	20	21	22	23	24	25	26	27	28	29	30	DC	Points	Ref
2018	Motopark	Volkswagen	PAU; 1 Ret	PAU; 2; 15	PAU; 3; 17	HUN; 1; 14	HUN; 2; 19	HUN; 3; 12	NOR; 1; 15	NOR; 2; 20	NOR; 3; 10	ZAN; 1; 18	ZAN; 2; 14	ZAN; 3; 12	SPA; 1; 14	SPA; 2; 13	SPA; 3; 8	SIL; 1; 15	SIL; 2; 14	SIL; 3 Ret	MIS; 1; 17	MIS; 2; 15	MIS; 3 Ret	NÜR; 1; 11	NÜR; 2 Ret	NÜR; 3; 16	RBR; 1; 15	RBR; 2 Ret	RBR; 3; 16	HOC; 1; 18	HOC; 2; 15	HOC; 3; 12	21st	5	

=== Complete Formula Renault Eurocup results ===
(key) (Races in bold indicate pole position; races in italics indicate points for the fastest lap of top ten finishers)

Year	Entrant	1	2	3	4	5	6	7	8	9	10	11	12	13	14	15	16	17	18	19	20	DC	Points
2019	Arden	MNZ; 1; 6	MNZ; 2; 10	SIL; 1	SIL; 2	MON; 1 Ret	MON; 2 Ret	LEC; 1; 9	LEC; 2; 5	SPA; 1; 3	SPA; 2; 8	NÜR; 1	NÜR; 2	HUN; 1	HUN; 2	CAT; 1	CAT; 2	HOC; 1; 6	HOC; 2; 15	YMC; 1; 5	YMC; 2; 7	9th	68

=== Complete FIA Formula 3 Championship results ===
(key) (Races in bold indicate pole position; races in italics indicate points for the fastest lap of top ten finishers)

Year	Entrant	1	2	3	4	5	6	7	8	9	10	11	12	13	14	15	16	17	18	DC	Points
2019	Campos Racing	CAT; FEA; 16	CAT; SPR; 12	LEC; FEA; Ret	LEC; SPR; Ret	RBR; FEA; 24	RBR; SPR; Ret	SIL; FEA; 20	SIL; SPR; 14	HUN; FEA; 13	HUN; SPR; 23	SPA; FEA; 25	SPA; SPR; 13	MNZ; FEA; 18	MNZ; SPR; 26	SOC; FEA; 16	SOC; SPR; 24†			27th	0
2020	ART Grand Prix	**RBR**; **FEA**; Ret	RBR; SPR; 13	RBR; FEA; 13	RBR; SPR; 9	HUN; FEA; 5	HUN; SPR; 8	SIL; FEA; 7	SIL; SPR; 21	SIL; FEA; 24	SIL; SPR; 13	CAT; FEA; 15	CAT; SPR; 13	SPA; FEA; 11	SPA; SPR; 10	MNZ; FEA; Ret	MNZ; SPR; 11	MUG; FEA; 9	MUG; SPR; 8	14th	31

^{†} Driver did not finish the race, but was classified as he completed over 90% of the race distance.

=== Complete Macau Grand Prix results ===
Year	Team	Car	Qualifying	Quali Race	Main race
2019	(France) ART Grand Prix	Dallara F3 2019	18th	15th	15th

=== Complete F3 Asian Championship results ===
(key) (Races in bold indicate pole position; races in italics indicate points for the fastest lap of top ten finishers)

Year	Entrant	1	2	3	4	5	6	7	8	9	10	11	12	13	14	15	DC	Points
2019-20	Pinnacle Motorsport	SEP1; 1	SEP1; 2	SEP1; 3	DUB; 1; 3	DUB; 2; 2	DUB; 3; 4	ABU; 1; 7	ABU; 2; 4	**ABU**; **3**; 1	SEP2; 1	SEP2; 2	SEP2; 3	CHA; 1	CHA; 2	CHA; 3	8th	96
