= 2019 Formula Renault Eurocup =

Motor racing competition

The 2019 Formula Renault Eurocup was a multi-event motor racing championship for open wheel, formula racing cars held across Europe. The championship featured drivers competing in 1.8 litre Formula Renault single seat race cars that conformed to the technical regulations for the championship. The 2019 season was the 29th Eurocup Formula Renault 2.0 season organized by the Renault Sport. The series visited nine circuits around the Europe, with one overseas round at Abu Dhabi.

The series used Formula Regional chassis for the first time and new 1.8-litre turbocharged engine. Hankook tyres were used for the first time replacing Michelin.

== Teams and drivers ==
On 14 November 2018, a provisional entry list of ten teams was released. Fortec Motorsports left the series, while BhaiTech Racing, FA Racing by Drivex and M2 Competition have joined the series for the first time. In December 2018, Josef Kaufmann Racing announced it would be withdrawing from the championship.

Team	No.	Driver name	Status	Rounds
(France) R-ace GP	1	(United Kingdom) Oscar Piastri (Note: Oscar Piastri is an Australian racing driver, despite being listed as Australian in entry list he raced under British racing license, with British flag raised above the podium and British anthem played after his wins.)		All
(France) R-ace GP	2	(Brazil) Caio Collet	R	All
(France) R-ace GP	3	(Russia) Aleksandr Smolyar		All
(France) R-ace GP	4	(Switzerland) Grégoire Saucy	G	9–10
(Netherlands) MP Motorsport	11	(France) Victor Martins		All
(Netherlands) MP Motorsport	12	(Italy) Lorenzo Colombo		All
(Netherlands) MP Motorsport	15	(Italy) Matteo Nannini	G	10
(Netherlands) MP Motorsport	18	(Belgium) Amaury Cordeel	R	All
(Italy) JD Motorsport	25	(Italy) Leonardo Lorandi	R	All
(Italy) JD Motorsport	27	(Belgium) Ugo de Wilde	R	All
(Italy) JD Motorsport	28	(Brazil) João Vieira	R	1–8
(United Kingdom) Arden	31	(Finland) Patrik Pasma	R	All
(United Kingdom) Arden	32	(United Kingdom) Frank Bird		All
(United Kingdom) Arden	33	(Spain) Sebastián Fernández (Note: Sebastián Fernández is a Venezuelan driver competing under a Spanish licence.)		1, 3–5, 9–10
(United Kingdom) Arden	33	(United Kingdom) Alex Quinn	R	6–8
(Belgium) M2 Competition	41	(India) Kush Maini	R	All
(Belgium) M2 Competition	42	(United States) Yves Baltas		1–3
(Belgium) M2 Competition	42	(South Africa) Callan O'Keeffe		5
(Belgium) M2 Competition	43	(Belgium) Esteban Muth	R	1
(Belgium) M2 Competition	43	(Germany) Lucas Alecco Roy	R	2–4, 7, 10
(Belgium) M2 Competition	46	(Switzerland) Patrick Schott	R	6–7
(Belgium) M2 Competition	46	(Spain) Kilian Meyer	G	8
(Belgium) M2 Competition	46	(Turkey) Cem Bölükbaşı	G	9
(Italy) Bhaitech	51	(Italy) Federico Malvestiti	R	All
(Italy) Bhaitech	53	(Czech Republic) Petr Ptáček	R	All
(Spain) FA Racing by Drivex	61	(United States) Brad Benavides	R	1–8
(Spain) FA Racing by Drivex	64	(South Africa) Callan O'Keeffe		1–4
(Spain) FA Racing by Drivex	64	(Angola) Rui Andrade		5
(Spain) FA Racing by Drivex	66	(Switzerland) Patrick Schott	R	1–4
(Spain) FA Racing by Drivex	66	(Argentina) Franco Colapinto	R G	5, 8
(Spain) FA Racing by Drivex	66	(Poland) Alex Karkosik		6–7
(Spain) GRS	71	(Italy) Alessio Deledda	R	1, 3–5, 9–10
(Spain) GRS	72	(Spain) Xavier Lloveras		All
(Spain) GRS	73	(Germany) Matthias Lüthen	G	10

Icon	Status
R	Rookie
G	Guest drivers ineligible for points

== Calendar ==
The provisional calendar for the 2019 season was announced on 18 October 2018. The calendar was finalised on 11 December 2018 with introduction of the Yas Marina Circuit as first non-European venue in the Eurocup history. Red Bull Ring round was dropped from the calendar.

Round		Circuit	Date	Supporting
1	R1	(Italy) Autodromo Nazionale Monza	13 April	Blancpain GT Series Endurance Cup
1	R2	(Italy) Autodromo Nazionale Monza	14 April	Blancpain GT Series Endurance Cup
2	R1	(United Kingdom) Silverstone Circuit	11 May	Blancpain GT Series Endurance Cup
2	R2	(United Kingdom) Silverstone Circuit	12 May	Blancpain GT Series Endurance Cup
3	R1	Circuit de Monaco	25 May	Monaco Grand Prix
3	R2	Circuit de Monaco	26 May	Monaco Grand Prix
4	R1	(France) Circuit Paul Ricard, Le Castellet	1 June	Blancpain GT Series Endurance Cup
4	R2	(France) Circuit Paul Ricard, Le Castellet	2 June	Blancpain GT Series Endurance Cup
5	R1	(Belgium) Circuit de Spa-Francorchamps, Spa	26 July	Blancpain GT Series Endurance Cup
5	R2	(Belgium) Circuit de Spa-Francorchamps, Spa	27 July	Blancpain GT Series Endurance Cup
6	R1	(Germany) Nürburgring	30 August	Blancpain GT World Challenge Europe
6	R2	(Germany) Nürburgring	1 September	Blancpain GT World Challenge Europe
7	R1	(Hungary) Hungaroring	7 September	Blancpain GT World Challenge Europe
7	R2	(Hungary) Hungaroring	8 September	Blancpain GT World Challenge Europe
8	R1	(Spain) Circuit de Barcelona-Catalunya	28 September	Blancpain GT Series Endurance Cup
8	R2	(Spain) Circuit de Barcelona-Catalunya	29 September	Blancpain GT Series Endurance Cup
9	R1	(Germany) Hockenheimring	5 October	Deutsche Tourenwagen Masters
9	R2	(Germany) Hockenheimring	6 October	Deutsche Tourenwagen Masters
10	R1	(United Arab Emirates) Yas Marina Circuit	25 October	TRD 86 Cup
10	R2	(United Arab Emirates) Yas Marina Circuit	26 October	TRD 86 Cup

== Results ==
Round		Circuit	Pole position	Fastest lap	Winning driver	Winning team	Rookie winner
1	R1	(Italy) Monza	(Italy) Lorenzo Colombo	(Italy) Leonardo Lorandi	(Belgium) Ugo de Wilde	(Italy) JD Motorsport	(Belgium) Ugo de Wilde
1	R2	(Italy) Monza	(Russia) Aleksandr Smolyar	(Russia) Aleksandr Smolyar	(Russia) Aleksandr Smolyar	(France) R-ace GP	(India) Kush Maini
2	R1	(United Kingdom) Silverstone	(United Kingdom) Oscar Piastri	(Russia) Aleksandr Smolyar	(United Kingdom) Oscar Piastri	(France) R-ace GP	(Brazil) João Vieira
2	R2	(United Kingdom) Silverstone	(United Kingdom) Oscar Piastri	(United Kingdom) Oscar Piastri	(United Kingdom) Oscar Piastri	(France) R-ace GP	(Brazil) Caio Collet
3	R1	Monaco	(France) Victor Martins	(United Kingdom) Oscar Piastri	(France) Victor Martins	(Netherlands) MP Motorsport	(Brazil) Caio Collet
3	R2	Monaco	(Russia) Aleksandr Smolyar	(France) Victor Martins	(Russia) Aleksandr Smolyar	(France) R-ace GP	(Brazil) João Vieira
4	R1	(France) Paul Ricard	(Italy) Lorenzo Colombo	(Italy) Lorenzo Colombo	(Italy) Lorenzo Colombo	(Netherlands) MP Motorsport	(Brazil) Caio Collet
4	R2	(France) Paul Ricard	(Italy) Lorenzo Colombo	(Italy) Lorenzo Colombo	(Italy) Lorenzo Colombo	(Netherlands) MP Motorsport	(Brazil) Caio Collet
5	R1	(Belgium) Spa-Francorchamps	(France) Victor Martins	(United Kingdom) Oscar Piastri	(United Kingdom) Oscar Piastri	(France) R-ace GP	(India) Kush Maini
5	R2	(Belgium) Spa-Francorchamps	(Italy) Leonardo Lorandi	(Spain) Sebastián Fernández	(Italy) Lorenzo Colombo	(Netherlands) MP Motorsport	(Brazil) Caio Collet
6	R1	(Germany) Nürburgring	(United Kingdom) Oscar Piastri	(Russia) Aleksandr Smolyar	(United Kingdom) Oscar Piastri	(France) R-ace GP	(Finland) Patrik Pasma
6	R2	(Germany) Nürburgring	(United Kingdom) Oscar Piastri	(United Kingdom) Oscar Piastri	(United Kingdom) Oscar Piastri	(France) R-ace GP	(United Kingdom) Alex Quinn
7	R1	(Hungary) Hungaroring	(France) Victor Martins	(Spain) Xavier Lloveras	(France) Victor Martins	(Netherlands) MP Motorsport	(Brazil) Caio Collet
7	R2	(Hungary) Hungaroring	(United Kingdom) Oscar Piastri	(United Kingdom) Oscar Piastri	(United Kingdom) Oscar Piastri	(France) R-ace GP	(Brazil) Caio Collet
8	R1	(Spain) Catalunya	(France) Victor Martins	(France) Victor Martins	(France) Victor Martins	(Netherlands) MP Motorsport	(United Kingdom) Alex Quinn
8	R2	(Spain) Catalunya	(France) Victor Martins	(France) Victor Martins	(France) Victor Martins	(Netherlands) MP Motorsport	(Czech Republic) Petr Ptáček
9	R1	(Germany) Hockenheim	(France) Victor Martins	(United Kingdom) Oscar Piastri	(France) Victor Martins	(Netherlands) MP Motorsport	(Brazil) Caio Collet
9	R2	(Germany) Hockenheim	(France) Victor Martins	(Russia) Aleksandr Smolyar	(Russia) Aleksandr Smolyar	(France) R-ace GP	(Brazil) Caio Collet
10	R1	(United Arab Emirates) Yas Marina	(France) Victor Martins	(France) Victor Martins	(United Kingdom) Oscar Piastri	(France) R-ace GP	(India) Kush Maini
10	R2	(United Arab Emirates) Yas Marina	(France) Victor Martins	(France) Victor Martins	(France) Victor Martins	(Netherlands) MP Motorsport	(Brazil) Caio Collet

== Championship standings ==
Points system

Points were awarded to the top 10 classified finishers.

Position	1st	2nd	3rd	4th	5th	6th	7th	8th	9th	10th
Points	25	18	15	12	10	8	6	4	2	1

=== Drivers' championship ===
Pos.	Driver	MNZ (Italy)		SIL (United Kingdom)		MON (Monaco)		LEC (France)		SPA (Belgium)		NÜR (Germany)		HUN (Note: Race 1 was stopped after 3 laps due to weather. Half points were awarded to top 10 finishers.) (Hungary)		CAT (Spain)		HOC (Germany)		YMC (United Arab Emirates)		Points
Pos.	Driver	R1	R2	R1	R2	R1	R2	R1	R2	R1	R2	R1	R2	R1	R2	R1	R2	R1	R2	R1	R2	Points
1	(United Kingdom) Oscar Piastri	18	4	1	1	4	5	2	6	1	4	1	1	DNS	1	5	3	2	2	1	4	320
2	(France) Victor Martins	4	2	10	3	1	2	3	3	2	5	5	DNS	1	3	1	1	1	5	2	1	312.5
3	(Russia) Aleksandr Smolyar	20	1	Ret	2	2	1	4	2	9	6	3	4	2	2	2	5	Ret	1	4	6	255
4	(Italy) Lorenzo Colombo	Ret	3	6	5	6	7	1	1	4	1	Ret	7	3	6	7	4	13	6	3	2	214.5
5	(Brazil) Caio Collet	12	7	5	4	3	4	5	4	8	2	6	3	4	4	4	7	3	3	8	3	207
6	(India) Kush Maini	3	5	18	6	10	11	6	21	5	9	7	8	15	5	Ret	12	7	4	6	Ret	102
7	(Belgium) Ugo de Wilde	1	Ret	4	7	9	12	7	8	13	12	10	9	DNS	11	9	6	4	11	13	11	81
8	(Czech Republic) Petr Ptáček	9	12	3	15	11	Ret	Ret	20	7	14	11	5	16	7	6	2	10	9	11	13	70
9	(Spain) Sebastián Fernández	6	10			Ret	Ret	9	5	3	8							6	15	5	7	68
10	(Finland) Patrik Pasma	13	8	9	16	7	10	18	14	6	15	2	12	7	13	8	15	8	10	7	8	65
11	(Brazil) João Vieira	7	11	2	10	5	3	8	10	11	18	12	13	11	8	WD	WD					59
12	(United Kingdom) Alex Quinn											4	2	8	Ret	3	11					48
13	(Italy) Leonardo Lorandi	2	6	7	11	Ret	8	16	11	Ret	7	16	Ret	10	12	10	9	14	13	15	16	45.5
14	(Italy) Federico Malvestiti	5	13	12	19	14	18	13	17	15	3	15	Ret	13	14	17	8	11	7	14	14	36
15	(Belgium) Amaury Cordeel	17	9	13	13	Ret	13	Ret	7	14	21	8	11	5	Ret	12	13	15	8	9	9	27
16	(Spain) Xavier Lloveras	21	Ret	17	12	Ret	6	12	9	10	17	9	6	9	Ret	13	17	12	14	Ret	10	24
17	(South Africa) Callan O'Keeffe	11	Ret	8	8	8	9	11	13	Ret	10											15
18	(United Kingdom) Frank Bird	8	14	15	20	13	15	10	12	17	11	13	10	6	Ret	15	16	9	16	17	15	14
19	(United States) Yves Baltas	10	Ret	11	9	16	17															3
20	(Germany) Lucas Alecco Roy			16	14	Ret	Ret	17	16					12	9					16	17	2
21	(Poland) Alex Karkosik											14	14	14	10							1
22	(Switzerland) Patrick Schott	15	Ret	14	17	12	19	15	15			Ret	Ret	17	15							0
23	(United States) Brad Benavides	14	Ret	19	18	17	14	14	18	19	13	WD	WD	DNS	16	14	14					0
24	(Italy) Alessio Deledda	16	Ret			15	16	19	19	18	19							DNS	Ret	18	18	0
25	(Belgium) Esteban Muth	19	15																			0
26	(Angola) Rui Andrade									16	16											0
guest drivers ineligible to score points
—	(Italy) Matteo Nannini																			10	5	—
—	(Switzerland) Grégoire Saucy																	5	12	12	12	—
—	(Argentina) Franco Colapinto									12	20					11	10					—
—	(Spain) Kilian Meyer															16	18					—
—	(Turkey) Cem Bölükbaşı																	16	Ret			—
—	(Germany) Matthias Lüthen																			19	19	—
Pos.	Driver	R1	R2	R1	R2	R1	R2	R1	R2	R1	R2	R1	R2	R1	R2	R1	R2	R1	R2	R1	R2	Points
Pos.	Driver	MNZ (Italy)		SIL (United Kingdom)		MON (Monaco)		LEC (France)		SPA (Belgium)		NÜR (Germany)		HUN (Hungary)		CAT (Spain)		HOC (Germany)		YMC (United Arab Emirates)		Points

=== Teams' championship ===
Only two-best cars are eligible to score points in the teams' championship.

Pos.	Team	MNZ (Italy)		SIL (United Kingdom)		MON (Monaco)		LEC (France)		SPA (Belgium)		NÜR (Germany)		HUN (Hungary)		CAT (Spain)		HOC (Germany)		YMC (United Arab Emirates)		Points
Pos.	Team	R1	R2	R1	R2	R1	R2	R1	R2	R1	R2	R1	R2	R1	R2	R1	R2	R1	R2	R1	R2	Points
1	(France) R-ace GP	12	1	1	1	2	1	2	2	1	2	1	1	2	1	2	3	2	1	1	3	637
1	(France) R-ace GP	18	4	5	2	3	4	4	4	8	4	3	3	4	2	4	5	3	2	4	4	637
2	(Netherlands) MP Motorsport	4	2	6	3	1	2	1	1	2	1	5	7	1	3	1	1	1	5	2	1	531
2	(Netherlands) MP Motorsport	17	3	10	5	6	7	3	3	4	5	8	11	3	6	7	4	13	6	3	2	531
3	(United Kingdom) Arden	6	8	9	16	7	10	9	5	3	8	2	2	6	7	3	11	6	10	5	7	189
3	(United Kingdom) Arden	8	10	15	20	13	15	10	12	6	11	4	12	13	Ret	8	15	8	15	7	8	189
4	(Italy) JD Motorsport	1	6	2	7	5	3	7	8	11	7	10	9	10	8	9	6	4	11	13	11	173.5
4	(Italy) JD Motorsport	2	11	4	10	9	8	8	10	13	12	12	13	11	11	10	9	14	13	15	16	173.5
5	(Belgium) M2 Competition	3	5	11	6	10	11	6	16	5	9	7	8	12	5	Ret	12	7	4	6	17	108
5	(Belgium) M2 Competition	10	15	16	9	16	17	17	21	Ret	10	Ret	Ret	15	9	16	18	16	Ret	16	Ret	108
6	(Italy) Bhaitech	5	12	3	15	11	18	13	17	7	3	11	5	13	7	6	2	10	7	11	13	106
6	(Italy) Bhaitech	9	13	12	19	14	Ret	Ret	20	15	14	15	Ret	16	14	17	8	11	9	14	14	106
7	(Spain) GRS	16	Ret	17	12	15	6	12	9	10	17	9	6	9	Ret	13	17	12	14	18	10	24
7	(Spain) GRS	21	Ret			Ret	16	19	19	18	19							DNS	Ret	Ret	18	24
8	(Spain) FA Racing by Drivex	11	Ret	8	8	8	9	11	13	16	13	14	14	14	10	14	14					15
8	(Spain) FA Racing by Drivex	14	Ret	14	17	12	14	14	15	19	16	WD	WD	DNS	16	11	10					15
Pos.	Team	R1	R2	R1	R2	R1	R2	R1	R2	R1	R2	R1	R2	R1	R2	R1	R2	R1	R2	R1	R2	Points
Pos.	Team	MNZ (Italy)		SIL (United Kingdom)		MON (Monaco)		LEC (France)		SPA (Belgium)		NÜR (Germany)		HUN (Hungary)		CAT (Spain)		HOC (Germany)		YMC (United Arab Emirates)		Points
