= Leonardo Lorandi =

Italian racing driver (Born 2000)

- Nationality: (Italy) Italian
- Born: 20 July 2000 (age 26) Salò, Italy
- Relatives: Alessio Lorandi (brother)

Previous series
- 2019 2018 2018 2017-2018: Formula Renault Eurocup; Euroformula Open Championship; ADAC Formula 4 Italian F4 Championship

Leonardo Lorandi (born 20 July 2000) is an Italian former racing driver who was the 2018 Italian F4 vice-champion and last competed for JD Motorsport in the 2019 edition of the Formula Renault Eurocup. In 2019, he was part of the Renault Sport Academy.

Lorandi is the younger brother of Alessio Lorandi, a racing driver who has reached the FIA Formula 2 Championship.

== Karting record ==
=== Karting career summary ===
Season	Series	Position
2012	Italian Karting Championship – Intercontinetal 60 Mini	1st
2012	WSK Euro Series – 60 Mini	1st
2012	WSK Super Masters Series – Under-12 class	1st
2012	WSK Final Cup – 60 Mini	1st
2014	WSK Super Masters Series – Primary junior class	3rd
2014	Trofeo Andrea Margutti – Primary junior class	3rd
2015	Trofeo Andrea Margutti – Primary senior class	2nd
2015	WSK Final Cup – KZ2	3rd
2016	WSK Super Masters Series – Secondary gearbox class	1st

== Racing record ==
=== Racing career summary ===
Season	Series	Team	Races	Wins	Poles	F/Laps	Podiums	Points	Position
2017	Italian F4 Championship	Bhaitech	21	1	0	1	4	185	6th
2018	Italian F4 Championship	Bhaitech	21	5	3	5	10	282	**2nd**
2018	ADAC Formula 4 Championship	KDC Racing	8	0	0	0	0	14	17th
2018	Euroformula Open Championship	RP Motorsport	2	0	0	0	0	20	15th
2019	Formula Renault Eurocup	JD Motorsport	20	0	1	1	1	45.5	13th

=== Complete Italian F4 Championship results ===
(key) (Races in bold indicate pole position) (Races in italics indicate fastest lap)

Year	Team	1	2	3	4	5	6	7	8	9	10	11	12	13	14	15	16	17	18	19	20	21	Pos	Points
2017	Bhaitech	MIS; 1; 9	MIS; 2; 14	MIS; 3; 19	ADR; 1; 5	ADR; 2; 1	ADR; 3; 6	VLL; 1; 6	VLL; 2; 10	VLL; 3; 7	MUG1; 1; 4	MUG1; 2; 4	MUG1; 3; 5	IMO; 1; 8	IMO; 2; 7	IMO; 3; 2	MUG2; 1; 4	MUG2; 2; 3	MUG2; 3; 4	MNZ; 1; 8	MNZ; 2; 3	MNZ; 3; 4	6th	185
2018	Bhaitech	ADR; 1; 2	**ADR**; **2**; 1	ADR; 3; 2	LEC; 1 Ret	LEC; 2; 6	LEC; 3; 4	MNZ; 1; 1	**MNZ**; **2**; 4	MNZ; 3; 1	MIS; 1; 8	MIS; 2; 4	MIS; 3; 2	IMO; 1; 1	**IMO**; **2**; 1	IMO; 3; 4	VLL; 1 Ret	VLL; 2; 4	VLL; 3; 3	MUG; 1; 24	MUG; 2; 2	MUG; 3; 5	2nd	282

=== Complete ADAC Formula 4 Championship results ===
(key) (Races in bold indicate pole position) (Races in italics indicate fastest lap)

Year	Team	1	2	3	4	5	6	7	8	9	10	11	12	13	14	15	16	17	18	19	20	Pos	Points
2018	KDC Racing	OSC; 1 Ret	OSC; 2; 7	OSC; 3; 14	HOC1; 1; 11	HOC1; 2 Ret	HOC1; 3; 18	LAU; 1; 6	LAU; 2; 11	LAU; 3 Ret	RBR; 1	RBR; 2	RBR; 3	HOC2; 1	HOC2; 2	NÜR; 1	NÜR; 2	NÜR; 3	HOC3; 1	HOC3; 2	HOC3; 3	17th	14

=== Complete Euroformula Open results ===
(key) (Races in bold indicate pole position) (Races in italics indicate fastest lap)

Year	Team	1	2	3	4	5	6	7	8	9	10	11	12	13	14	15	16	Pos	Points
2018	RP Motorsport	EST; 1	EST; 2	LEC; 1	LEC; 2	SPA; 1	SPA; 2	HUN; 1	HUN; 2	SIL; 1	SIL; 2	MNZ; 1; 4	MNZ; 2; 6	JER; 1	JER; 2	CAT; 1	CAT; 2	15th	20

=== Complete Formula Renault Eurocup results ===
(key) (Races in bold indicate pole position) (Races in italics indicate fastest lap)

Year	Team	1	2	3	4	5	6	7	8	9	10	11	12	13	14	15	16	17	18	19	20	Pos	Points
2019	JD Motorsport	MNZ; 1; 2	MNZ; 2; 6	SIL; 1; 7	SIL; 2; 11	MON; 1 Ret	MON; 2; 8	LEC; 1; 16	LEC; 2; 11	SPA; 1 Ret	SPA; 2; 7	NÜR; 1; 16	NÜR; 2 Ret	HUN; 1; 10	HUN; 2; 12	CAT; 1; 10	CAT; 2; 9	HOC; 1; 14	HOC; 2; 13	YMC; 1; 15	YMC; 2; 16	13th	45.5
