= Artem Petrov =

Russian racing driver

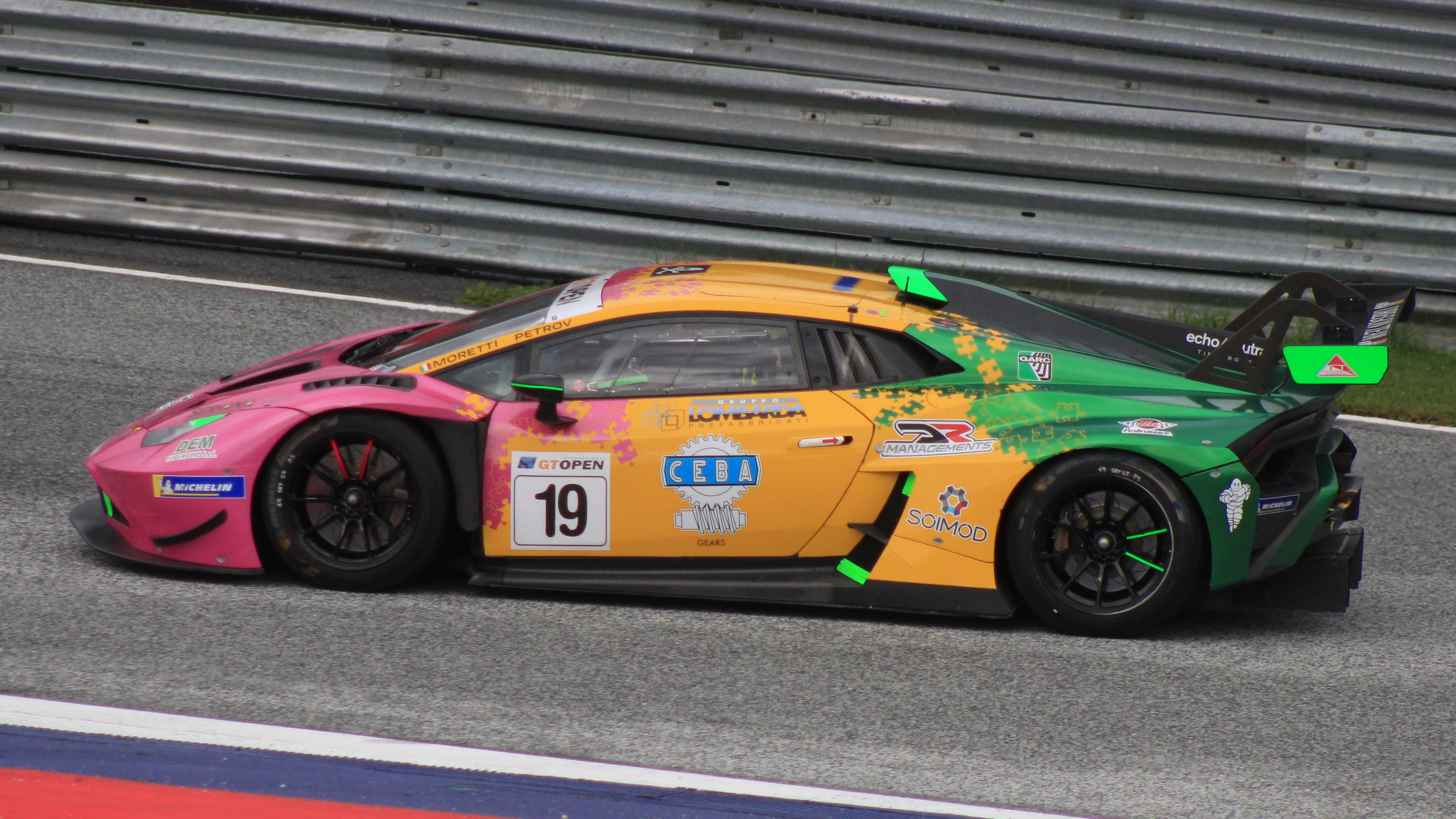
- Nationality: Russian (Note: Petrov is Russian, but has competed under Russian and Israeli racing licences.)
- Born: Artem Sergeyevich Petrov; 14 January 2000 (age 26) Saint Petersburg, Russia

Indy Pro 2000 Championship career
- Debut season: 2019
- Current team: Exclusive Autosport
- Categorisation: FIA Silver
- Car number: 42
- Former teams: RP Motorsport; Juncos Racing
- Starts: 40
- Wins: 3
- Poles: 1
- Fastest laps: 0
- Best finish: 4th in 2020, 2021

Previous series
- 2017 2016–17 2016: ADAC Formula 4 Italian F4 Championship; SMP F4 Championship

Artem Sergeyevich Petrov (Russian: Артём Сергеевич Петро́в, IPA: [ɐrˈtɵm pʲɪˈtrof], born 14 January 2000) is a Russian racing driver who is currently competing in the International GT Open. He previously competed in the 2021 Indy Pro 2000 Championship for Exclusive Autosport.

Petrov is not related to Formula One driver Vitaly Petrov.

== Career ==
=== Karting ===
Born in Saint Petersburg, Petrov began his karting career since the early ages before entering Russian and Finnish championships in 2008. He became Russian champion in KF-Junior category in 2014 as well as won the Russian Cup. Petrov took part in CIK-FIA World Karting Championship in KF-Junior category where he became sixth in 2015. He also won the Vega International Winter Trophy, finished on podium in several international WSK races.

=== Formula 4 ===
In 2016, Petrov graduated to single-seaters. He competed in the 2016 Italian F4 Championship with DR Formula and had two podium finishes in overall rankings along with seven rookie podiums.

Petrov remained in the Italian Championship with DR Formula for 2017. He won two races at Monza and had another seven podium finishes, a pole position and six fastest laps, completing the top-five in the season standings. He also competed in 2017 ADAC Formula 4 Championship with Lechner Racing, DR Formula and Van Amersfoort Racing. He won the championship finale at Hockenheim and ended the season 15th despite the fact that he took part only in three events of the season.

=== FIA Formula 3 European Championship ===
In February 2018, it was announced that Petrov would continue his collaboration with Van Amersfoort Racing into the FIA Formula 3 European Championship campaign. He finished 20th in the standings with seven points.

== Racing record ==
=== Career summary ===
| Season | Series | Team | Races | Wins | Poles | F/Laps | Podiums | Points | Position |
|---|---|---|---|---|---|---|---|---|---|
| 2016 | Italian F4 Championship | DR Formula | 21 | 0 | 0 | 1 | 2 | N/A | NC† |
| 2016 | SMP F4 Championship | SMP Racing | 13 | 0 | 0 | 0 | 0 | 14 | 15th |
| 2017 | Italian F4 Championship | DR Formula | 21 | 2 | 1 | 6 | 9 | 192 | 5th |
| 2017 | ADAC Formula 4 Championship | Lechner Racing | 1 | 0 | 0 | 0 | 0 | 56 | 15th |
| 2017 | ADAC Formula 4 Championship | DR Formula | 3 | 0 | 0 | 0 | 0 | 56 | 15th |
| 2017 | ADAC Formula 4 Championship | Van Amersfoort Racing | 6 | 1 | 0 | 0 | 2 | 56 | 15th |
| 2018 | FIA Formula 3 European Championship | Van Amersfoort Racing | 30 | 0 | 0 | 0 | 0 | 7 | 20th |
| 2019 | Indy Pro 2000 Championship | RP Motorsport | 5 | 0 | 0 | 0 | 0 | 72 | 15th |
| 2019 | Euroformula Open Championship | RP Motorsport | 2 | 0 | 0 | 0 | 0 | 0 | 28th |
| 2019 | FIA Formula 3 Championship | Jenzer Motorsport | 2 | 0 | 0 | 0 | 0 | 0 | 31st |
| 2019 | Toyota Racing Series | M2 Competition | 13 | 1 | 0 | 1 | 3 | 181 | 9th |
| 2020 | Indy Pro 2000 Championship | Juncos Racing | 17 | 2 | 1 | 0 | 7 | 326 | 4th |
| 2021 | Indy Pro 2000 Championship | Exclusive Autosport | 18 | 2 | 0 | 0 | 9 | 374 | 4th |
| 2023 | Italian GT Championship - GT3 | Vincenzo Sospiri Racing | | | | | | | |
| 2023 | GT World Challenge Europe Endurance Cup | VSR | 1 | 0 | 0 | 0 | 0 | 0 | NC |
| 2023 | Lamborghini Super Trofeo Europe | VSR | | | | | | | |
| 2024 | International GT Open | Oregon Team | 14 | 0 | 0 | 0 | 0 | 15 | 22nd |
| 2024 | GT World Challenge Europe Endurance Cup | GRT Grasser Racing Team | 1 | 0 | 0 | 0 | 0 | 0 | NC |
| 2025 | International GT Open | Oregon Team | 14 | 0 | 0 | 0 | 0 | 26 | 12th |
| 2025 | GT World Challenge Europe Endurance Cup | VSR | 1 | 0 | 0 | 0 | 0 | 0 | NC |
| 2026 | Italian GT Championship Endurance Cup - GT3 | Oregon Team | 2 | 0 | 0 | 0 | 0 | 9 | 17th |
| 2026 | Italian GT Championship Endurance Cup - GT3 | Raptor Engineering | 2 | 0 | 0 | 0 | 0 | 9 | 17th |
| 2026 | Italian GT Championship Sprint Cup - GT3 | Oregon Team | 4 | 0 | 0 | 0 | 0 | 0 | NC† |

^{†} As Petrov was a guest driver, he was ineligible to score points.

^{*} Season still in progress.

=== Complete SMP F4 Championship results ===
(key) (Races in bold indicate pole position) (Races in italics indicate fastest lap)

| Year | Team | 1 | 2 | 3 | 4 | 5 | 6 | 7 | 8 | 9 | 10 | 11 | 12 | 13 | 14 | 15 | 16 | 17 | 18 | 19 | 20 | DC | Points |
|---|---|---|---|---|---|---|---|---|---|---|---|---|---|---|---|---|---|---|---|---|---|---|---|
| 2016 | SMP Racing | SOC; 1; 10 | SOC; 2 EX | ZAN1; 1; 14 | ZAN1; 2; 9 | ZAN1; 3; 7 | ZAN2; 1 Ret | ZAN2; 2; 13 | ZAN2; 3 Ret | MSC1; 1 Ret | MSC1; 2 DNS | MSC1; 3 Ret | MSC2; 1; 8 | MSC2; 2; 11 | MSC2; 3; 10 | AND; 1 | AND; 2 | AND; 3 | AHV; 1 | AHV; 2 | AHV; 3 | 15th | 14 |

=== Complete Italian F4 Championship results ===
(key) (Races in bold indicate pole position) (Races in italics indicate fastest lap)

| Year | Team | 1 | 2 | 3 | 4 | 5 | 6 | 7 | 8 | 9 | 10 | 11 | 12 | 13 | 14 | 15 | 16 | 17 | 18 | 19 | 20 | 21 | 22 | 23 | DC | Points |
|---|---|---|---|---|---|---|---|---|---|---|---|---|---|---|---|---|---|---|---|---|---|---|---|---|---|---|
| 2016 | DR Formula | MIS; 1; 21 | MIS; 2; 14 | MIS; 3 | MIS; 4 Ret | ADR; 1; 12 | ADR; 2; 15 | ADR; 3 | ADR; 4; 27 | IMO1; 1; 13 | IMO1; 2; 15 | IMO1; 3; 12 | MUG; 1; 19 | MUG; 2; 14 | MUG; 3; 22 | VAL; 1; 2 | VAL; 2; 7 | VAL; 3; 5 | IMO2; 1 Ret | IMO2; 2; 6 | IMO2; 3; 2 | MNZ; 1 Ret | MNZ; 2 Ret | MNZ; 3; 4 | NC | 0 |
| 2017 | DR Formula | MIS; 1; 2 | MIS; 2 Ret | MIS; 3; 3 | ADR; 1 Ret | ADR; 2; 6 | ADR; 3; 19 | **VAL**; **1**; 3 | VAL; 2; 2 | VAL; 3; 2 | MUG1; 1; 12 | MUG1; 2; 3 | MUG1; 3; 7 | IMO; 1; 10 | IMO; 2; 9 | IMO; 3; 20 | MUG2; 1; 6 | MUG2; 2 Ret | MUG2; 3; 2 | MNZ; 1; 1 | MNZ; 2; 1 | MNZ; 3 Ret | | | 5th | 192 |

=== Complete ADAC Formula 4 Championship results ===
(key) (Races in bold indicate pole position) (Races in italics indicate fastest lap)

| Year | Team | 1 | 2 | 3 | 4 | 5 | 6 | 7 | 8 | 9 | 10 | 11 | 12 | 13 | 14 | 15 | 16 | 17 | 18 | 19 | 20 | 21 | DC | Points |
|---|---|---|---|---|---|---|---|---|---|---|---|---|---|---|---|---|---|---|---|---|---|---|---|---|
| 2017 | Lechner Racing | OSC1; 1 | OSC1; 2 | OSC1; 3 | LAU; 1 | LAU; 2 | LAU; 3 | RBR; 1 Ret | RBR; 2 DNS | RBR; 3 DNS | OSC2; 1 | OSC2; 2 | OSC2; 3 | | | | | | | | | | 15th | 56 |
| 2017 | DR Formula | | | | | | | | | | | | | NÜR; 1; 12 | NÜR; 2; 22 | NÜR; 3; 10 | | | | | | | 15th | 56 |
| 2017 | Van Amersfoort Racing | | | | | | | | | | | | | | | | SAC; 1; 10 | SAC; 2; 16 | SAC; 3; 2 | HOC; 1; 6 | HOC; 2; 8 | HOC; 3; 1 | 15th | 56 |

=== Complete FIA Formula 3 European Championship results ===
(key) (Races in bold indicate pole position) (Races in italics indicate fastest lap)

| Year | Entrant | Engine | 1 | 2 | 3 | 4 | 5 | 6 | 7 | 8 | 9 | 10 | 11 | 12 | 13 | 14 | 15 | 16 | 17 | 18 | 19 | 20 | 21 | 22 | 23 | 24 | 25 | 26 | 27 | 28 | 29 | 30 | DC | Points |
|---|---|---|---|---|---|---|---|---|---|---|---|---|---|---|---|---|---|---|---|---|---|---|---|---|---|---|---|---|---|---|---|---|---|---|
| 2018 | Van Amersfoort Racing | Mercedes | PAU; 1; 17 | PAU; 2 Ret | PAU; 3; 15 | HUN; 1; 20 | HUN; 2; 23 | HUN; 3; 17 | NOR; 1; 13 | NOR; 2; 18 | NOR; 3; 11 | ZAN; 1; 15 | ZAN; 2; 15 | ZAN; 3; 9 | SPA; 1; 8 | SPA; 2 Ret | SPA; 3; 18 | SIL; 1 Ret | SIL; 2; 16 | SIL; 3; 13 | MIS; 1; 13 | MIS; 2; 17 | MIS; 3; 15 | NÜR; 1; 15 | NÜR; 2; 13 | NÜR; 3; 17 | RBR; 1; 21 | RBR; 2 Ret | RBR; 3; 14 | HOC; 1; 13 | HOC; 2; 16 | HOC; 3; 10 | 20th | 7 |

=== Complete Toyota Racing Series results ===
(key) (Races in bold indicate pole position) (Races in italics indicate fastest lap)

| Year | Team | 1 | 2 | 3 | 4 | 5 | 6 | 7 | 8 | 9 | 10 | 11 | 12 | 13 | 14 | 15 | 16 | 17 | DC | Points |
|---|---|---|---|---|---|---|---|---|---|---|---|---|---|---|---|---|---|---|---|---|
| 2019 | M2 Competition | HIG; 1; 10 | HIG; 2 Ret | HIG; 3; 6 | TER; 1; 3 | TER; 2 C | TER; 3 C | HMP; 1; 1 | HMP; 2 Ret | HMP; 3; 7 | HMP; 4; 2 | TAU; 1; 4 | TAU; 2; 4 | TAU; 3; 4 | TAU; 4 Ret | MAN; 1 DNS | MAN; 2 DNS | MAN; 3 Ret | 9th | 181 |

=== Complete FIA Formula 3 Championship results ===
(key) (Races in bold indicate pole position; races in italics indicate points for the fastest lap of top ten finishers)

| Year | Entrant | 1 | 2 | 3 | 4 | 5 | 6 | 7 | 8 | 9 | 10 | 11 | 12 | 13 | 14 | 15 | 16 | DC | Points |
|---|---|---|---|---|---|---|---|---|---|---|---|---|---|---|---|---|---|---|---|
| 2019 | Jenzer Motorsport | CAT; FEA; 18 | CAT; SPR; Ret | LEC; FEA | LEC; SPR | RBR; FEA | RBR; SPR | SIL; FEA | SIL; SPR | HUN; FEA | HUN; SPR | SPA; FEA | SPA; SPR | MNZ; FEA | MNZ; SPR | SOC; FEA | SOC; SPR | 31st | 0 |

=== Complete Euroformula Open Championship results ===
(key) (Races in bold indicate pole position; races in italics indicate points for the fastest lap of top ten finishers)

| Year | Entrant | 1 | 2 | 3 | 4 | 5 | 6 | 7 | 8 | 9 | 10 | 11 | 12 | 13 | 14 | 15 | 16 | 17 | 18 | DC | Points |
|---|---|---|---|---|---|---|---|---|---|---|---|---|---|---|---|---|---|---|---|---|---|
| 2019 | RP Motorsport | LEC; 1 Ret | LEC; 2; 14 | PAU; 1 | PAU; 2 | HOC; 1 | HOC; 2 | SPA; 1 | SPA; 2 | HUN; 1 | HUN; 2 | RBR; 1 | RBR; 2 | SIL; 1 | SIL; 2 | CAT; 1 | CAT; 2 | MNZ; 1 | MNZ; 2 | 0 | |

=== American open-wheel racing results ===
(key)

==== Indy Pro 2000 Championship ====
(key) (Races in bold indicate pole position) (Races in italics indicate fastest lap) (Races with * indicate most race laps led)

| Year | Team | 1 | 2 | 3 | 4 | 5 | 6 | 7 | 8 | 9 | 10 | 11 | 12 | 13 | 14 | 15 | 16 | 17 | 18 | Rank | Points |
|---|---|---|---|---|---|---|---|---|---|---|---|---|---|---|---|---|---|---|---|---|---|
| 2019 | RP Motorsport Racing | STP | STP | IMS | IMS | LOR | ROA | ROA | TOR | TOR | MOH | MOH | GTW; 7 | PIR; 10 | PIR; 5 | LAG; 5 | LAG; 15 | | | 15th | 72 |
| 2020 | Juncos Racing | ROA; 13 | ROA; 1 | MOH; 5 | MOH; 1 | MOH; 8 | LOR; 9 | GMP; 3 | IMS; 10 | IMS; 3 | IMS; 3 | MOH; 4 | MOH; 5 | NJM; 5 | NJM; 3 | NJM; 11 | STP; 3 | STP; 9 | | 4th | 326 |
| 2021 | Exclusive Autosport | ALA; 2 | ALA; 3 | STP; 4 | STP; 8 | IMS; 5 | IMS; 1 | IMS; 5 | LOR; 7 | ROA; 2 | ROA; 11 | MOH; 2 | MOH; 2 | GMP; 12 | NJM; 9 | NJM; 1 | NJM; 3 | MOH; 2 | MOH; 4 | 4th | 374 |

* Season still in progress

=== Complete International GT Open results ===
(key) (Races in bold indicate pole position; races in italics indicate points for the fastest lap of top ten finishers)

| Year | Team | Car | Class | 1 | 2 | 3 | 4 | 5 | 6 | 7 | 8 | 9 | 10 | 11 | 12 | 13 | 14 | DC | Points |
|---|---|---|---|---|---|---|---|---|---|---|---|---|---|---|---|---|---|---|---|
| 2024 | Oregon Team | Lamborghini Huracán GT3 Evo 2 | Pro | ALG; 1 Ret | ALG; 2; 8 | HOC; 1; 12 | HOC; 2; 13 | SPA; 9 | HUN; 1 Ret | HUN; 2; 17 | LEC; 1; 11 | LEC; 2; 15 | RBR; 1; 8 | RBR; 2; 6 | CAT; 1; 12 | CAT; 2; 27 | MNZ; 11 | 22nd | 15 |
| 2025 | Oregon Team | Lamborghini Huracán GT3 Evo 2 | Pro | ALG; 1; 12 | ALG; 2; 16 | SPA; 9 | HOC; 1; 11 | HOC; 2; 10 | HUN; 1; 18 | HUN; 2; 16 | LEC; 1; 9 | LEC; 2; 7 | RBR; 1; 11 | RBR; 2; 4 | CAT; 1; 12 | CAT; 2; 10 | MNZ; 8 | 12th | 26 |
