= Italian F4 Championship =

Single-Seater Racing Championship

Italian Formula 4 Championship
- Category: FIA Formula 4
- Country: Italy
- Region: Europe
- Inaugural season: 2014
- Constructors: Tatuus
- Engine suppliers: Abarth
- Tyre suppliers: Pirelli
- Drivers' champion: (Japan) Kean Nakamura-Berta
- Teams' champion: (Italy) Prema Racing
- Official website: Official website

The Italian Formula 4 Championship is the first formula racing series regulated according to FIA Formula 4 regulations, and promoted by the Automobile Club d'Italia (ACI) and WSK Promotion. The inaugural season was the 2014 Italian F4 Championship, effectively replacing the Formula Abarth.

The Italian F4 championship is regarded as amongst the most competitive of the national/regional F4 championships. Lance Stroll, Lando Norris, Mick Schumacher, Jack Doohan, Zhou Guanyu, Ollie Bearman, Andrea Kimi Antonelli And Arvid Lindblad have since driven in Formula One, and numerous Italian F4 drivers have had professional careers in other series.

== History ==
Gerhard Berger and the FIA Singleseater Commission launched the FIA Formula 4 in March 2013. The goal of the Formula 4 is to make the ladder to Formula 1 more transparent.

The Italian Formula 4 was the first FIA Formula 4 championship to be launched. The Italian championship was launched by the ACI-CSAI on December 12, 2013.

WSK Promotion, well known for its kart races in the WSK Euro Series e.a., was contracted to promote the championship, along with the original promoter ACI Sport.

== Cars ==
Italian race car constructor Tatuus was contracted to design and build all the cars. Tatuus had also built all the cars for the Formula Abarth. The chassis is a monocoque made of carbon fibre.

The engine is a 1400cc Fiat-FPT. This is the same engine used in the Formula Abarth between 2010 and 2013. It is detuned to fit the FIA Formula 4 regulations to 160 hp (120 kW), down from the original 180 hp (130 kW).

Starting from 2022, Tatuus F4-T421 have been used instead of Tatuus F4-T014.

== Costs ==
The original goal of Formula 4 was to keep total costs for competitors under 100,000€ (in 2014) per season, but as of 2024 typical costs in the Italian championship far exceed this figure. One 2022 estimate put the season cost of competition at "upwards of 250,000€", one of the most expensive F4 series globally.

The costs of competition in feeder series are typically met by either competitors families or wealthy benefactors, without an immediate commercial return for any funds provided.

== Champions ==
=== Drivers ===
Season	Driver	Team	Poles	Wins	Podiums	Fastest laps	Points	Clinched	Margin
2014	(Canada) Lance Stroll	(Italy) Prema Powerteam	5	7	13	11	331	Race 15 of 21	94
2015	(Estonia) Ralf Aron	(Italy) Prema Powerteam	7	9	13	6	331	Race 18 of 21	108
2016	(Argentina) Marcos Siebert	(Switzerland) Jenzer Motorsport	4	4	9	1	231	Race 20 of 21	15
2017	(New Zealand) Marcus Armstrong	(Italy) Prema Powerteam	5	4	13	1	283	Race 19 of 21	36
2018	(Brazil) Enzo Fittipaldi	(Italy) Prema Theodore Racing	9	7	10	5	303	Race 21 of 21	21
2019	(Norway) Dennis Hauger	(Netherlands) Van Amersfoort Racing	7	12	16	9	369	Race 18 of 21	136
2020	(Italy) Gabriele Minì	(Italy) Prema Powerteam	8	4	12	2	284	Race 18 of 21	76
2021	(United Kingdom) Oliver Bearman	(Netherlands) Van Amersfoort Racing	8	11	15	2	343	Race 18 of 21	111
2022	(Italy) Andrea Kimi Antonelli	(Italy) Prema Racing	14	13	15	14	362	Race 18 of 20	104
2023	(Poland) Kacper Sztuka	(Germany) US Racing	9	9	12	8	315	Race 20 of 21	35
2024	(United Kingdom) Freddie Slater	(Italy) Prema Racing	11	15	16	10	383	Race 17 of 21	161
2025	(Japan) Kean Nakamura-Berta	(Italy) Prema Racing	8	9	17	3	342	Race 22 of 25	75

=== Teams ===
Season	Team	Poles	Wins	Podiums	Fastest laps	Points	Clinched	Margin
2014	(Italy) Prema Powerteam	13	13	11	31	303	Race 15 of 21	58
2015	(Italy) Prema Powerteam	9	12	22	7	339	Race 19 of 21	35
2016	(Italy) Prema Powerteam	7	9	21	9	439.5	Race 19 of 21	43.5
2017	(Italy) Bhaitech	9	8	17	6	565	Race 18 of 21	89
2018	(Italy) Prema Theodore Racing	13	12	28	8	667	Race 19 of 21	187
2019	(Netherlands) Van Amersfoort Racing	9	12	24	10	576	Race 21 of 21	28
2020	(Italy) Prema Powerteam	15	6	24	8	596	Race 21 of 21	101
2021	(Netherlands) Van Amersfoort Racing	11	13	23	4	585	Race 18 of 21	102
2022	(Italy) Prema Racing	19	16	38	19	800	Race 18 of 21	289
2023	(Italy) Prema Racing	10	12	40	9	791	Race 17 of 21	245
2024	(Italy) Prema Racing	12	16	30	12	763	Race 17 of 21	221
2025	(Italy) Prema Racing	14	17	38	10	825	Race 19 of 25	378

=== Winter Trophy ===
Season	Driver	Team	Poles	Wins (Trophy)	Podiums	Fastest laps	Points	Clinched	Margin
2014	(Estonia) Ralf Aron	(Italy) Prema Powerteam	2	1 (2)	2	1	38	Race 1 of 2	0

=== Trophy ===
In the concurrent Italian F4 Trophy for drivers over the age of 18.

Season	Driver	Team	Poles	Wins (Trophy)	Podiums	Fastest laps	Points	Clinched	Margin
2014	(France) Brandon Maïsano	(Italy) Prema Powerteam	8	6 (17)	17	6	406	Race 12 of 21	176
2015	(Colombia) Kevin Kanayet	Malta Formula Racing	0	9 (21)	17	1	337	Race 17 of 21	28

=== Woman Trophy ===
Season	Driver	Team	Poles	Wins (Trophy)	Podiums	Fastest laps	Points	Clinched	Margin	Participants
2015	(Poland) Julia Pankiewicz	(Switzerland) RB Racing	0	11	17	0	343	Race 17 of 21	112	2
2016	(Liechtenstein) Fabienne Wohlwend	(Germany) Aragon Racing (Portugal) DR Formula	0	18	18	0	400	Race 11 of 21	N/A	1
2019	(United Arab Emirates) Amna Al Qubaisi	(United Arab Emirates) Abu Dhabi Racing by Prema	0	17	19	0	400	Race 13 of 21	271	2
2020	(United Arab Emirates) Hamda Al Qubaisi	(United Arab Emirates) Abu Dhabi Racing by Prema	0	15	15	0	375	Race 12 of 21	N/A	1
2021	(Spain) Maya Weug	(Italy) Iron Lynx	0	11	20	0	437	Race 21 of 21	43	2
2022	(Spain) Maya Weug	(Italy) Iron Lynx	0	18	20	0	400	Race 20 of 20	91	2
2023	(Switzerland) Tina Hausmann	(San Marino) AKM Motorsport	0	7	15	0	310	Race 20 of 20	9	4
2025	(United Kingdom) Emily Cotty	(France) R-ace GP	0	12	17	0	369	Race 25 of 25	51	4

=== Rookie Class ===
The result of the championship was decided by different standings. Wins and points of the rookie standings are present in brackets.

Season	Driver	Team	Poles	Wins (rookie)	Podiums	Fastest laps	Points (rookie)	Clinched	Margin
2016	(Estonia) Jüri Vips	(Italy) Prema Powerteam	2	1 (8)	7	3	140 (247.5)	Race 20 of 21	40
2017	(Italy) Leonardo Lorandi	(Italy) Bhaitech	0	1 (19)	2	4	185 (400)	Race 16 of 21	107
2018	(Czech Republic) Petr Ptáček	(Italy) Bhaitech	0	0 (11)	6	3	182 (365)	Race 18 of 21	22
2019	(Estonia) Paul Aron	(Italy) Prema Powerteam	1	2 (9)	8	0	226 (348)	Race 18 of 21	87
2020	(Italy) Gabriele Minì	(Italy) Prema Powerteam	8	4 (6)	12	2	284 (318)	Race 19 of 21	67
2021	(Russia) Nikita Bedrin	(Netherlands) Van Amersfoort Racing	0	1 (6)	4	0	103 (240)	Race 21 of 21	1
2022	(Italy) Andrea Kimi Antonelli	(Italy) Prema Racing	14	13 (14)	15	14	362 (378)	Race 18 of 20	97
2023	(United Kingdom) Arvid Lindblad	(Italy) Prema Racing	4	6 (8)	10	3	263.5 (322.5)	Race 18 of 20	15.5
2024	(United States) Alex Powell	(Italy) Prema Racing	1	0 (10)	6	0	176 (343)	Race 21 of 21	15
2025	(Colombia) Salim Hanna	(Italy) Prema Racing	1	0 (11)	6	0	180 (356)	Race 23 of 25	42

== Drivers graduated to Formula One ==
- **Bold** denotes an active Formula One driver.
- Gold background denotes Italian F4 champion.

Driver	Italian F4			
Driver	Seasons	Races	Wins	Podiums
**(Canada) Lance Stroll**	2014	18	7	13
**(United Kingdom) Lando Norris**	2015	9	0	1
(China) Zhou Guanyu	2015	21	3	9
(Germany) Mick Schumacher	2016	18	5	10
(Australia) Jack Doohan	2018	6	0	0
**(Brazil) Gabriel Bortoleto**	2020	20	1	5
**(United Kingdom) Oliver Bearman**	2020–2021	29	7	14
**(Italy) Kimi Antonelli**	2021–2022	29	13	18
**(United Kingdom) Arvid Lindblad**	2022–2023	29	6	10

== Circuits ==
- **Bold** denotes a circuit is used in the 2026 season.
- **Italic** denotes a future circuit will be used in the 2027 season.

Number	Circuits	Rounds	Years
1	(Italy) **Imola Circuit**	17 (Note: Imola Circuit hosted 2 rounds in 2014–2016 and 2020.)	2014–present
2	(Italy) **Mugello Circuit**	15 (Note: Mugello Circuit hosted 2 rounds in 2017, and it hosts 2 rounds in 2026.)	2014–present
3	(Italy) **Misano World Circuit**	14 (Note: Misano World Circuit hosted 2 rounds in 2025, it hosts 2 rounds in 2026, and it will host 2 rounds in 2027.)	2015–present
4	(Italy) **Vallelunga Circuit**	13	2014–present
4	(Italy) **Monza Circuit**	13	2014–present
6	(Italy) Adria International Raceway	5	2014–2018
7	(Austria) Red Bull Ring	4	2019–2022
7	(France) Circuit Paul Ricard	4	2018, 2021, 2023–2024
9	(Belgium) Circuit de Spa-Francorchamps	2	2022–2023
9	(Spain) **Circuit de Barcelona-Catalunya**	2	2024–2025, 2027
11	(Italy) Autodromo dell'Umbria	1	2014
11	(Hungary) Hungaroring	1	2019
