= Fabio Scherer =

Swiss racing driver

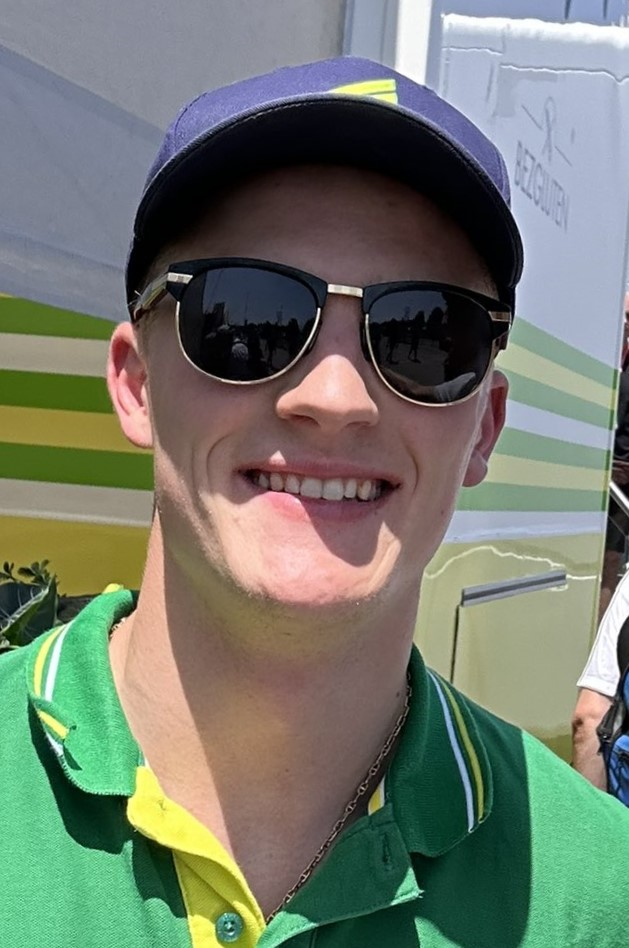
- Scherer in 2023
- Nationality: (Switzerland) Swiss
- Born: 13 June 1999 (age 27) Aesch, Lucerne

FIA World Endurance Championship career
- Debut season: 2021
- Current team: Inter Europol Competition
- Categorisation: FIA Silver (until 2021); FIA Gold (2022–)
- Car number: 34
- Former teams: United Autosports USA
- Starts: 14
- Wins: 3
- Poles: 2
- Fastest laps: 0
- Best finish: 2nd in 2023

Previous series
- 2022 2022 2021 2020 2019 2018 2016–17 2016–17 2016: European Le Mans Series; IMSA SportsCar Championship; FIA World Endurance Championship; Deutsche Tourenwagen Masters; FIA Formula 3 Championship; FIA Formula 3 European Championship; ADAC Formula 4 Formula 4 UAE Championship; Italian F4 Championship

Fabio Luca Scherer (born 13 June 1999) is a Swiss racing driver currently competing in the GT World Challenge Europe Endurance Cup and Nürburgring Langstrecken-Serie for HRT Ford Racing.

Scherer started his single-seater career in 2016, staying in Formula 4 series for two seasons. In 2018, he moved to 2018 FIA Formula 3 European Championship, racing for Motopark Academy. Scherer then competed for Charouz Racing System in the new FIA Formula 3 Championship for 2019.

Since 2021, Scherer competes in the endurance racing, taking on the FIA World Endurance Championship including 24 Hours of Le Mans, European Le Mans Series and IMSA SportsCar Championship.

== Sportscar career ==
=== 2020: DTM debut ===
For the 2020 season, Scherer would migrate to sportscar racing, driving an Audi RS5 Turbo DTM for the Audi Sport Team WRT in the Deutsche Tourenwagen Masters. He experienced a challenging campaign, only breaking through to score points at the Zolder Circuit, where he finished fifth on two occasions. Scherer ended up 16th in the standings, last of all full-time competitors.

=== 2021: Switch to LMP2 ===
Scherer moved to prototypes in 2021, driving in the LMP2 class of the FIA World Endurance Championship. Driving alongside Filipe Albuquerque and Phil Hanson at United Autosports, Scherer began the year with a win during his debut at Spa-Francorchamps before having to miss the next round due to COVID-19. The trio took another win at Monza, though they would only finish the 24 Hours of Le Mans in 18th thanks to a mid-race alternator failure. Scherer ended the year fifth in the standings.

Scherer also drove for Fach Auto Tech in the Porsche Supercup the same year, taking a best finish of eleventh at the Red Bull Ring.

=== 2022: ELMS campaign ===
Having joined Inter Europol Competition ahead of the 2022 season, Scherer made a one-off appearance in the WEC to replace a COVID-stricken Alex Brundle before embarking on a campaign in the ELMS, where he would be partnered by Pietro Fittipaldi and David Heinemeier Hansson. Together, the squad scored a podium at Spa on their way to eighth in the teams' championship. They also took part in the 24 Hours of Le Mans, finishing 14th.

In addition, Scherer drove for High Class Racing in five races of the IMSA SportsCar Championship, where he too made a lone rostrum appearance at Road America.

=== 2023: Le Mans glory ===
Scherer remained at Inter Europol the following year, returning to the WEC on a full-time basis alongside Albert Costa and Jakub Śmiechowski. The trio scored points in all seven races, even taking a podium at Spa, though the highlight of the season, as well as a personal success story for Scherer, turned out to come at Le Mans: during Scherer's first pit stop the Corvette Racing car drove over his left foot after he had exited the car, resulting in an incomplete fracture and ligament damage. In spite of the pain, Scherer continued driving throughout the 24-hour event, even passing the WRT of Robert Kubica during the morning and holding on against a late charge from Louis Delétraz to cross the line first despite radio issues inside the final hour. This result moved IEC into second in the standings, a position they would defend until the end of the campaign.

=== 2024: United return ===
Scherer returned to the ELMS in 2024, partnering Paul di Resta and Bijoy Garg at United Autosports. The trio scored a best finish of sixth place in three races and finished 11th in the standings. Scherer also drove for Nielsen Racing at Le Mans, where an overnight collision caused by teammate Heinemeier Hansson caused the team to drop down the field; they went on to finish 11th in class.

=== 2025: Ford DTM drive ===
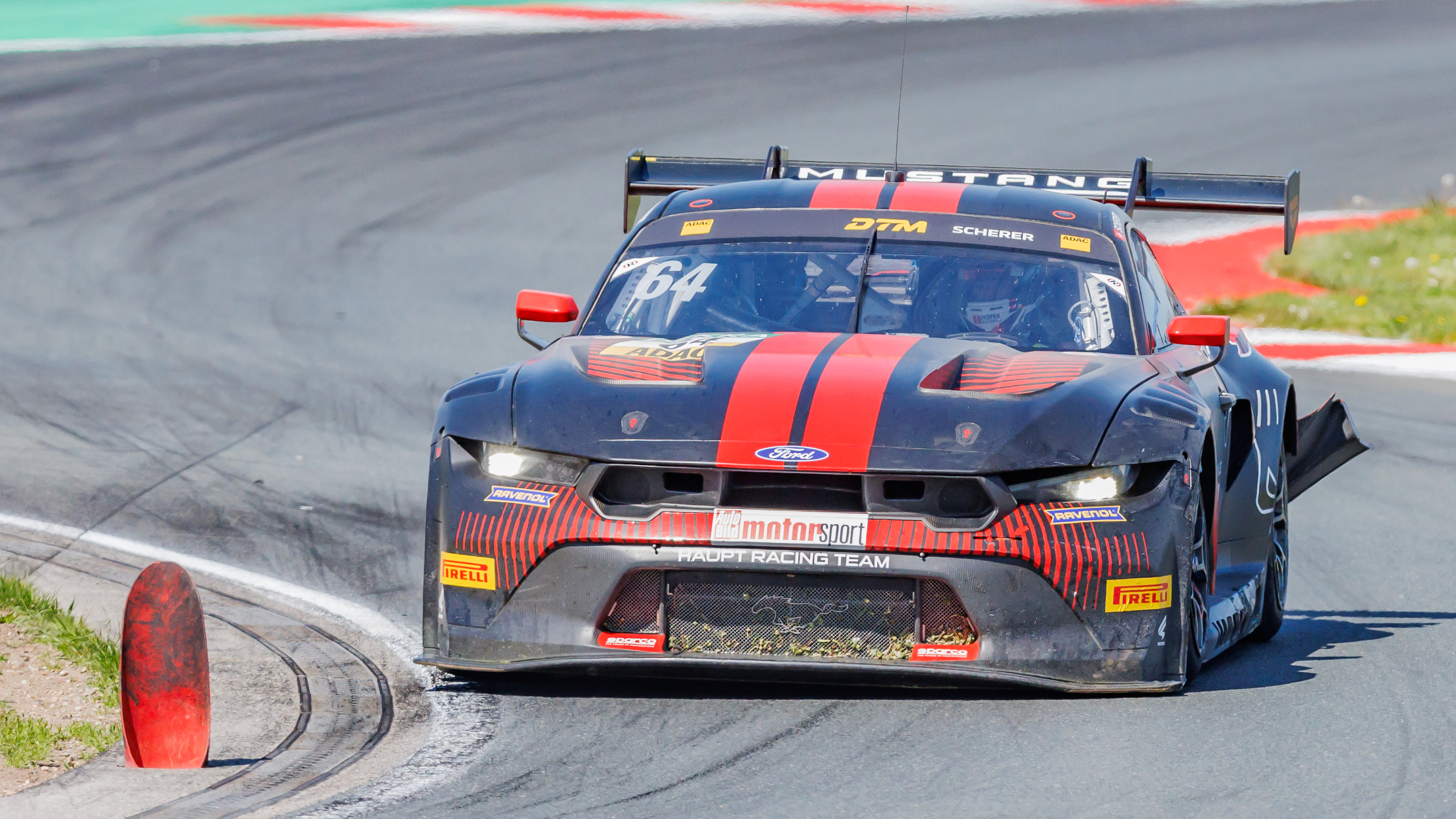
Scherer racing at Oschersleben in the 2025 DTM season.

Going into 2025, Scherer was announced as a GT3 junior driver at Ford, as part of which he re-entered the DTM with the Haupt Racing Team. His comeback, at the wheel of the Ford Mustang GT3, ended with finishes of 19th and 18th at Oschersleben. Scherer retired from the first race at the Lausitzring with an ABS failure, having previously drawn the ire of Jordan Pepper with an aggressive manoeuvre at the start. Having benefitted from chaos at the start of race 2 to progress from 22nd to ninth, Scherer was forced to retire again later on after a clash with Nicolas Baert. Scherer scored his first points at a rainy Zandvoort with 11th in race 1, but could not start race 2 due to a drive shaft failure. He then damaged his suspension with a crash in qualifying ahead of the Saturday race at the Norisring; it could not be repaired in time and Scherer missed out on the start. Sunday's race ended prematurely after Scherer's Ford lost a wheel on lap 19. Chaos continued at the Nürburgring, where Scherer spun in avoidance of Mirko Bortolotti on lap 1. He finished both races in the lower positions.

Scherer achieved his best result of the season at the Sachsenring: having gained time and places during the pit stop phase, Scherer finished race 1 in eighth. More points followed in race 2 with an 11th place. A third points finish in succession followed in Spielberg, as Scherer started and finished 14th in race 1. A drive shaft issue prematurely ended his Sunday race. Two finishes in the lower midfield at Hockenheim consigned Scherer to a 23rd-place finish in the drivers' standings.

During 2025, Scherer also made his GT3 Nürburgring Nordschleife debut, coming second in NLS9 alongside Jann Mardenborough and Dennis Fetzer. He took part in NLS10 two weeks later, where he set a new NLS qualifying lap record with a time of 7:48.717. Scherer and Patrick Assenheimer finished the race fourth overall and first in the SP9 Pro-Am class.

== Racing record ==
=== Career summary ===
Season	Series	Team	Races	Wins	Poles	F/Laps	Podiums	Points	Position
2016	ADAC Formula 4 Championship	Jenzer Motorsport	24	1	0	0	1	26	17th
2016	Italian F4 Championship	Jenzer Motorsport	9	0	0	0	0	3	29th
2016–17	Formula 4 UAE Championship	Rasgaira Motorsports	8	1	0	0	2	77	8th
2017	ADAC Formula 4 Championship	US Racing	21	1	0	3	6	154.5	5th
2018	FIA Formula 3 European Championship	Motopark	30	0	1	2	1	64	14th
2019	FIA Formula 3 Championship	Sauber Junior Team by Charouz	16	0	0	0	0	7	17th
2020	Deutsche Tourenwagen Masters	Audi Sport Team WRT	18	0	0	1	0	20	16th
2021	FIA World Endurance Championship - LMP2	United Autosports USA	5	2	0	0	2	84	5th
2021	24 Hours of Le Mans - LMP2	United Autosports USA	1	0	0	0	0	N/A	18th
2021	Porsche Supercup	Fach Auto Racing	7	0	0	0	0	0	NC†
2022	FIA World Endurance Championship - LMP2	Inter Europol Competition	1	0	0	0	0	0	29th
2022	European Le Mans Series - LMP2	Inter Europol Competition	6	0	0	0	1	32	10th
2022	24 Hours of Le Mans - LMP2	Inter Europol Competition	1	0	0	0	0	N/A	14th
2022	IMSA SportsCar Championship - LMP2	High Class Racing	5	0	0	0	1	1225	10th
2023	FIA World Endurance Championship - LMP2	Inter Europol Competition	7	1	0	0	3	114	**2nd**
2023	24 Hours of Le Mans - LMP2	Inter Europol Competition	1	1	0	0	1	N/A	**1st**
2024	European Le Mans Series - LMP2	United Autosports	6	0	0	0	0	27	11th
2024	24 Hours of Le Mans - LMP2	Nielsen Racing	1	0	0	0	0	N/A	11th
2025	Deutsche Tourenwagen Masters	HRT Ford Performance	14	0	0	0	0	20	23rd
2025	Nürburgring Langstrecken-Serie - SP9	HRT Ford Performance	2	0	1	0	1	0	NC†
2025	Nürburgring Langstrecken-Serie - VT2	Walkenhorst Motorsport	1	0	0	0	0	N/A	NC
2026	Nürburgring Langstrecken-Serie - SP9	HRT Ford Racing							
2026	24 Hours of Nürburgring - SP9	HRT Ford Racing	1	0	0	0	0	N/A	DNF
2026	GT World Challenge Europe Endurance Cup	HRT Ford Racing	5	0	1	0	0	16	16th
2026-27	Asian Le Mans Series - GT3	Haupt Racing Team							

^{†} As Scherer was a guest driver, he was ineligible for points.

=== Complete ADAC Formula 4 Championship results ===
(key) (Races in bold indicate pole position) (Races in italics indicate fastest lap)

Year	Team	1	2	3	4	5	6	7	8	9	10	11	12	13	14	15	16	17	18	19	20	21	22	23	24	Pos	Points
2016	Jenzer Motorsport	OSC1; 1; 14	OSC1; 2; 17	OSC1; 3; 18	SAC; 1; 21	SAC; 2; 15	SAC; 3; 22	LAU; 1; 14	LAU; 2; 10	LAU; 3; 1	OSC2; 1 Ret	OSC2; 2; 16	OSC2; 3; 14	RBR; 1 Ret	RBR; 2; 20	RBR; 3; 15	NÜR; 1; 21	NÜR; 2; 16	NÜR; 3; 16	ZAN; 1; 17	ZAN; 2; 16	ZAN; 3; 16	HOC; 1; 24	HOC; 2 Ret	HOC; 3; 33	17th	26
2017	US Racing	OSC1; 1; 4	OSC1; 2; 3	OSC1; 3; 8	LAU; 1 DSQ	LAU; 2 DSQ	LAU; 3 DSQ	RBR; 1 Ret	RBR; 2; 9	RBR; 3; 10	OSC2; 1; 4	OSC2; 2; 3	OSC2; 3; 5	NÜR; 1; 3	NÜR; 2; 11	NÜR; 3; 15	SAC; 1; 2	SAC; 2; 1	SAC; 3; 5	HOC; 1; 3	HOC; 2 Ret	HOC; 3; 11				5th	154.5

=== Complete Italian F4 Championship results ===
(key) (Races in bold indicate pole position) (Races in italics indicate fastest lap)

Year	Team	1	2	3	4	5	6	7	8	9	10	11	12	13	14	15	16	17	18	19	20	21	22	23	Pos	Points
2016	Jenzer Motorsport	MIS; 1; 25	MIS; 2; 13	MIS; 3	MIS; 4; 26	ADR; 1	ADR; 2; 18	ADR; 3; 9	ADR; 4; 13	IMO1; 1; 10	IMO1; 2 Ret	IMO1; 3; 25	MUG; 1	MUG; 2	MUG; 3	VAL; 1	VAL; 2	VAL; 3	IMO2; 1	IMO2; 2	IMO2; 3	MNZ; 1	MNZ; 2	MNZ; 3	29th	3

=== Complete Formula 4 UAE Championship results ===
(key) (Races in bold indicate pole position) (Races in italics indicate fastest lap)

Year	Team	1	2	3	4	5	6	7	8	9	10	11	12	13	14	15	16	17	18	Pos	Points
2016-17	Rasgaira Motorsports	DUB1; 1	DUB1; 2	DUB1; 3	YMC1; 1	YMC1; 2	YMC1; 3	YMC1; 4	DUB2; 1	DUB2; 2	DUB2; 3	YMC2; 1; 5	YMC2; 2; 2	YMC2; 3; 7	YMC2; 4; 1	YMC3; 1; 4	YMC3; 2; 10	YMC3; 3; 4	YMC3; 4 Ret	8th	77

=== Complete FIA Formula 3 European Championship results ===
(key) (Races in bold indicate pole position) (Races in italics indicate fastest lap)

Year	Entrant	Engine	1	2	3	4	5	6	7	8	9	10	11	12	13	14	15	16	17	18	19	20	21	22	23	24	25	26	27	28	29	30	DC	Points
2018	Motopark	Volkswagen	PAU; 1; 11	PAU; 2 Ret	PAU; 3; 4‡	HUN; 1; 10	HUN; 2; 11	HUN; 3; 10	NOR; 1; 19	NOR; 2; 10	NOR; 3; 16	ZAN; 1; 13	ZAN; 2; 9	ZAN; 3; 5	SPA; 1; 9	SPA; 2; 2	SPA; 3; 10	SIL; 1; 10	**SIL**; **2** Ret	SIL; 3; 11	MIS; 1; 14	MIS; 2; 10	MIS; 3; 8	NÜR; 1 Ret	NÜR; 2; 11	NÜR; 3; 14	RBR; 1; 9	RBR; 2; 7	RBR; 3; 12	HOC; 1 Ret	HOC; 2; 6	HOC; 3; 11	14th	64

^{‡} Half points awarded as less than 75% of race distance was completed.

=== Complete FIA Formula 3 Championship results ===
(key) (Races in bold indicate pole position; races in italics indicate points for the fastest lap of top ten finishers)

Year	Entrant	1	2	3	4	5	6	7	8	9	10	11	12	13	14	15	16	DC	Points
2019	Sauber Junior Team by Charouz	CAT; FEA; 27	CAT; SPR; Ret	LEC; FEA; 15	LEC; SPR; Ret	RBR; FEA; Ret	RBR; SPR; 23	SIL; FEA; 16	SIL; SPR; 8	HUN; FEA; 15	HUN; SPR; 13	SPA; FEA; 27	SPA; SPR; 18	MNZ; FEA; 8	MNZ; SPR; 7	SOC; FEA; Ret	SOC; SPR; Ret	17th	7

=== Complete Deutsche Tourenwagen Masters results ===
(key) (Races in bold indicate pole position; races in italics indicate fastest lap)

Year	Entrant	Chassis	1	2	3	4	5	6	7	8	9	10	11	12	13	14	15	16	17	18	Rank	Points
2020	Audi Sport Team WRT	Audi RS5 Turbo DTM	SPA; 1; 12	SPA; 2; 12	LAU; 1; 14	LAU; 2; 11	LAU; 1; 13	LAU; 2; 15	ASS; 1; 15	ASS; 2 Ret	NÜR; 1; 15	NÜR; 2; 16†	NÜR; 1 Ret	NÜR; 2; 14	ZOL; 1; 13	ZOL; 2; 5	ZOL; 1; 5	ZOL; 2 Ret	HOC; 1; 13†	HOC; 2; 12	16th	20
2025	HRT Ford Performance	Ford Mustang GT3	OSC; 1; 19	OSC; 2; 18	LAU; 1 Ret	LAU; 2 Ret	ZAN; 1; 11	ZAN; 2 DNS	NOR; 1 DNS	NOR; 2 Ret	NÜR; 1; 18	NÜR; 2; 19	SAC; 1; 8	SAC; 2; 11	RBR; 1; 14	RBR; 2 Ret	HOC; 1; 17	HOC; 2; 18			23rd	20

^{†} Did not finish, but was classified as he had completed more than 90% of the race distance.

=== Complete Porsche Supercup results ===
(key) (Races in bold indicate pole position) (Races in italics indicate fastest lap)

Year	Team	1	2	3	4	5	6	7	8	Pos.	Points
2021	Fach Auto Racing	MON	RBR; 19	RBR; 11	HUN; 16	SPA; 22	ZND; 16	MNZ; 19	MNZ; 17	NC†	0

^{†} As Scherer was a guest driver, he was ineligible to score points.

=== Complete 24 Hours of Le Mans results ===
Year	Team	Co-Drivers	Car	Class	Laps	Pos.	Class Pos.
2021	(United Kingdom) United Autosports USA	(United Kingdom) Phil Hanson (Portugal) Filipe Albuquerque	Oreca 07-Gibson	LMP2	328	40th	18th
2022	(Poland) Inter Europol Competition	(Brazil) Pietro Fittipaldi (Denmark) David Heinemeier Hansson	Oreca 07-Gibson	LMP2	364	18th	14th
2023	(Poland) Inter Europol Competition	(Spain) Albert Costa (Poland) Jakub Śmiechowski	Oreca 07-Gibson	LMP2	328	9th	**1st**
2024	(United Kingdom) Nielsen Racing	(Denmark) David Heinemeier Hansson (Cayman Islands) Kyffin Simpson	Oreca 07-Gibson	LMP2	291	25th	11th

=== Complete FIA World Endurance Championship results ===
(key) (Races in bold indicate pole position) (Races in italics indicate fastest lap)

Year	Entrant	Class	Car	Engine	1	2	3	4	5	6	7	Rank	Points
2021	United Autosports USA	LMP2	Oreca 07	Gibson GK428 4.2 L V8	**SPA**; 1	ALG; WD	MNZ; 1	LMS; 10	BHR; 4	**BHR**; 4		5th	84
2022	Inter Europol Competition	LMP2	Oreca 07	Gibson GK428 4.2 L V8	SEB; 14	SPA	LMS; 14†	MNZ	FUJ	BHR		29th	0
2023	Inter Europol Competition	LMP2	Oreca 07	Gibson GK428 4.2 L V8	SEB; 3	ALG; 9	SPA; 3	LMS; 1	MNZ; 5	FUJ; 9	BHR; 6	2nd	114

^{†} Non World Endurance Championship entries are ineligible to score points.

=== Complete European Le Mans Series results ===
(Races in bold indicate pole position; results in italics indicate fastest lap)

Year	Entrant	Class	Chassis	Engine	1	2	3	4	5	6	Rank	Points
2022	Inter Europol Competition	LMP2	Oreca 07	Gibson GK428 4.2 L V8	LEC; 11	IMO; 9	MNZ; 11	CAT; 16	SPA; 2	ALG; 4	10th	32
2024	United Autosports	LMP2	Oreca 07	Gibson GK428 4.2 L V8	CAT; 9	LEC; 12	IMO; 6	SPA; 10	MUG; 6	ALG; 6	11th	27

=== Complete IMSA SportsCar Championship results ===
(key) (Races in bold indicate pole position; results in italics indicate fastest lap)

Year	Team	Class	Make	Engine	1	2	3	4	5	6	7	Pos.	Points
2022	High Class Racing	LMP2	Oreca 07	Gibson GK428 V8	DAY; 9†	SEB; 6	LGA	MDO	WGL; 4	ELK; 3	ATL; 4	10th	1225

^{†} Points only counted towards the Michelin Endurance Cup, and not the overall LMP2 Championship. ^{*} Season still in progress.

=== Complete GT World Challenge Europe results ===
==== GT World Challenge Europe Endurance Cup ====
(key) (Races in bold indicate pole position) (Races in italics indicate fastest lap)

Year	Team	Car	Class	1	2	3	4	5	6	7	Pos.	Points
2026	HRT Ford Racing	Ford Mustang GT3 Evo	Pro	LEC; 25	**MNZ**; Ret	SPA; 6H; 6	SPA; 12H; 7	SPA; 24H; Ret	NÜR; 6	ALG; 16	16th	16

* Season still in progress
