= 2022 24 Hours of Le Mans =

90th 24 Hours of Le Mans endurance race

Previous: 2021	Next: 2023
Index: Races | Winners

(France) 2022 24 Hours of Le Mans
Event information
- Round 3 of 6 in the 2022 FIA World Endurance Championship
- Date: 11–12 June 2022
- Location: Le Mans, France
- Venue: Circuit de la Sarthe
- Duration: 24 Hours

Results
- Laps completed: 380
- Distance (km): 5177.17
- Distance (miles): 3217
- Hypercar

Pole position
- Time: 3:24.408
- Team: (Japan) Toyota Gazoo Racing
- Drivers: (New Zealand) Brendon Hartley

Winners
- Team: (Japan) Toyota Gazoo Racing
- Drivers: (Switzerland) Sébastien Buemi (New Zealand) Brendon Hartley (Japan) Ryō Hirakawa
- LMP2

Winners
- Team: (United Kingdom) Jota
- Drivers: (Mexico) Roberto González (Portugal) António Félix da Costa (United Kingdom) Will Stevens
- LMP2 Pro-Am

Winners
- Team: (Portugal) Algarve Pro Racing
- Drivers: (United States) Steven Thomas (Australia) James Allen (Austria) René Binder
- GTE Pro

Winners
- Team: (Germany) Porsche GT Team
- Drivers: (Italy) Gianmaria Bruni (Austria) Richard Lietz (France) Frédéric Makowiecki
- GTE Am

Winners
- Team: (United Kingdom) TF Sport
- Drivers: (United States) Ben Keating (Portugal) Henrique Chaves (Denmark) Marco Sørensen

The race-winning No. 8 Toyota GR010 Hybrid

The 90th 24 Hours of Le Mans (French: 90^{e} 24 Heures du Mans) was a 24-hour automobile endurance event that was held in front of 244,200 spectators on 11 and 12 June 2022 at the Circuit de la Sarthe, near Le Mans, France for Le Mans Hypercar (Hypercar), Le Mans Prototypes (LMP) and Le Mans Grand Touring Endurance (LMGTE) cars that were entered by teams of three drivers each. It was the 90th edition of the event organised by the Automobile Club de l'Ouest, and the third round of the 2022 FIA World Endurance Championship. A test day was held the week before the race on 5 June.

A Toyota GR010 Hybrid shared by Sébastien Buemi, Brendon Hartley and Ryō Hirakawa started from pole position after Hartley recorded the fastest overall lap time in the Hyperpole session. The three drivers led for 274 of the race's 380 laps and finished first, two minutes and 1.222 seconds ahead of teammates Mike Conway, Kamui Kobayashi and José María López (who shared another Toyota GR010 Hybrid). It was Buemi's fourth Le Mans victory, Hartley's third, Hirakawa's first and Toyota's fifth in succession. A Glickenhaus SCG 007 LMH shared by Ryan Briscoe, Franck Mailleux and Richard Westbrook completed the podium, five laps behind in third place.

Jota's team of Roberto González, António Félix da Costa and Will Stevens, sharing an Oreca 07-Gibson car, won the Le Mans Prototype 2 (LMP2) category after leading for all but 15 laps. The debuting Prema squad of Lorenzo Colombo, Louis Delétraz and Robert Kubica followed, two minutes and 21 seconds later, and the class podium was completed by the sister Jota trio of Jonathan Aberdein, Ed Jones and Oliver Rasmussen in third place. In the final Le Mans Grand Touring Endurance Pro (LMGTE Pro) race at Le Mans, the No. 91 Porsche 911 RSR-19 of Gianmaria Bruni, Richard Lietz and Frédéric Makowiecki won the category; AF Corse's No. 51 Ferrari 488 GTE Evo, shared by James Calado, Alessandro Pier Guidi and Daniel Serra, was second. Aston Martin won the Le Mans Grand Touring Endurance Am (LMGTE AM) class with an TF Sport-run Aston Martin Vantage GTE, shared by Henrique Chaves, Ben Keating and Marco Sørensen, 44.446 seconds ahead of WeatherTech Racing's Porsche 911 RSR-19 driven by Julien Andlauer, Cooper MacNeil and Thomas Merrill.

The Alpine trio of André Negrão, Nicolas Lapierre and Matthieu Vaxivière remained atop the Hypercar Drivers' Championship; their advantage was reduced to three points over Buemi, Hartley and Hirakawa, who passed Glickenhaus' Romain Dumas and Olivier Pla for second. Bruni and Lietz took the GTE Drivers' Championship lead by three points over their Porsche teammates Michael Christensen and Kévin Estre. Toyota and Porsche left Le Mans as the respective Hypercar World Endurance and GTE Manufacturers' Championship leaders with three rounds remaining in the season.

== Background ==
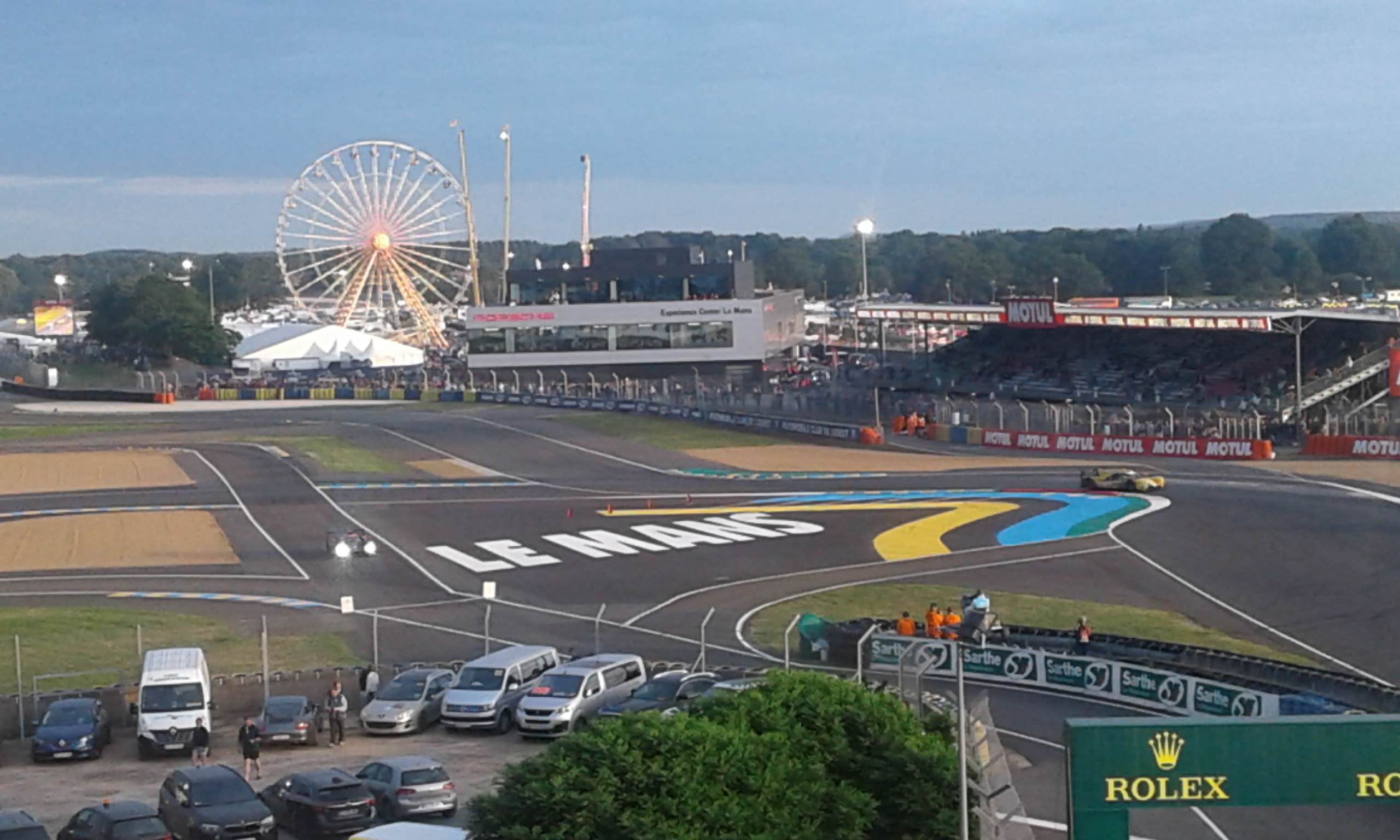
The Circuit de la Sarthe, where the race was held

The 24 Hours of Le Mans was first held in 1923 after automotive journalist Charles Faroux, Automobile Club de l'Ouest (ACO) general secretary Georges Durand and industrialist Emile Coquile agreed to conduct a test of vehicle reliability and durability. Considered one of the world's most prestigious motor races, it is part of the Triple Crown of Motorsport. The 2022 race, held at the Circuit de la Sarthe (near Le Mans, France) from 11 to 12 June 2022, was the event's 90th edition and the third round of the 2022 FIA World Endurance Championship. This was the first Le Mans race to host a full crowd and be run in June since restrictions were imposed in response to the COVID-19 pandemic in France.

Before the race, Alpine drivers André Negrão, Nicolas Lapierre and Matthieu Vaxivière led the Hypercar Drivers' Championship with 57 points. Glickenhaus' Romain Dumas and Olivier Pla were second with 39 points, and Toyota's Sébastien Buemi, Brendon Hartley and Ryō Hirakawa were third with 27. Porsche's Michael Christensen and Kévin Estre led the GTE Drivers' Championship with 57 points, ahead of AF Corse's James Calado and Alessandro Pier Guidi (43 points) and third-place Tommy Milner and Nick Tandy of Corvette (39 points). Alpine led Toyota in the Hypercar World Endurance Championship, and Porsche led Ferrari in the GTE Manufacturers' Championship.

== Regulation and circuit changes ==
Following the 2021 race, where clerk of the course Patrick Morrisseau was almost struck by an approaching car at the finish line, the ACO allowed Morrisseau to wave the checkered flag from a footbridge in the event of a close finish for safety reasons. For the first time, all entries used Fédération Internationale de l'Automobile-compliant renewable fuel produced by TotalEnergies from wine residue to reduce carbon-dioxide emissions.

A section of the Mulsanne Straight from the Antares roundabout to the first chicane was resurfaced to make it more suitable for public and motor racing use after an inspection discovered that there were signs that the tarmac surface was becoming fatigued as well as damage to the asphalt covering the shoulders.

== Entries ==
Entry to the race was initially open from 6 December 2021 to 28 February 2022. In response to the Russian G-Drive Racing team's suspension of its racing programme and measures imposed on Russian drivers and entries by international sporting bodies after the country's invasion of Ukraine, the ACO selection committee invited new applicants to apply for entry to the race from 7 to 9 March 2022. The committee issued 62 invitations, and entries were placed into the Le Mans Hypercar (LMH), Le Mans Prototype 2 (LMP2), Le Mans Grand Touring Endurance Professional (LMGTE Pro) and Le Mans Grand Touring Endurance Amateur (LMGTE Am) classes. Peugeot Sport withdrew their planned entries so they could continue testing their 9X8 Hypercars before homologation.

=== Automatic entries ===
Teams which won their class in the 2021 24 Hours of Le Mans or won championships in the European Le Mans Series (ELMS), Asian Le Mans Series (ALMS) and the Michelin Le Mans Cup (MLMC), received automatic entry invitations. The second-place finishers in the 2021 ELMS in LMP2 and LMGTE championships also received an automatic invitation. Two participants from the IMSA SportsCar Championship (WTSC) were chosen by the ACO as automatic entries, regardless of performance or category. Teams earning automatic entries in LMP2 were allowed to change their cars from the previous year. ELMS LMGTE and ALMS GT teams earning automatic entries were allowed to use them in LMGTE Pro or LMGTE Am. The 2021 European and 2022 Asian LMP3 (Le Mans Prototype 3) champions were eligible to field an entry in LMP2, and the 2021 MLMC Group GT3 (GT3) champion was limited to the LMGTE Am category. The ACO announced the final list of automatic entries on 28 February 2022.

Automatic entries for the 2022 24 Hours of Le Mans
Reason invited	LMP2	LMGTE Pro	LMGTE Am
1st in the 24 Hours of Le Mans	(Belgium) Team WRT		(Italy) AF Corse
1st in the European Le Mans Series (LMP2 and LMGTE)	(Belgium) Team WRT	(Italy) Iron Lynx	
2nd in the European Le Mans Series (LMP2 and LMGTE)	(United Kingdom) United Autosports	(Switzerland) Spirit of Race	
1st in the European Le Mans Series (LMP3)	(Luxembourg) DKR Engineering		
IMSA SportsCar Championship at-large entries	(United States) Ben Keating		(United States) Rob Ferriol
1st in the Asian Le Mans Series (LMP2 and GT)	(United Kingdom) Nielsen Racing	(United Kingdom) Inception Racing	
1st in the Asian Le Mans Series (LMP3)	(Spain) CD Sport		
1st in the Michelin Le Mans Cup (GT3)			(Italy) Iron Lynx

=== Entry list ===
The ACO was scheduled to announce the 62-car list on 28 February but due to "administrative reasons", the announcement was delayed; it was published on 10 March. In addition to the 38 guaranteed WEC entries, 14 came from the ELMS, four each from IMSA and the ALMS, and three were one-off Le Mans entries. In addition to the 62 entries invited to the race, six (three each from LMP2 and LMGTE Am) were placed on a reserve list to replace withdrawn or unaccepted invitations. Reserve entries were ordered, with the first replacing the first withdrawal from the race regardless of class. Entries were selected for their sporting and technical quality, fan, media and public interest and commitment, and loyalty to other ACO-administered series.

After publication of the entry list, Racing Team Nederland withdrew its TDS Racing-run Oreca 07 entry from third in the reserve list to enable to team to focus on the IMSA endurance races. On 31 May, Hardpoint Motorsport (which received an automatic invitation through the IMSA for driver Rob Ferriol, who received the 2021 Akin Award as the highest-placed bronze-ranked IMSA entrant) withdrew their LMGTE Am-category Porsche 911 RSR-19 and relinquished the entry to Proton Competition. Proton gave it to the Absolute Racing customer squad, which raced under the Hardpoint Motorsport name in accordance with ACO regulations. Josh Pierson (driving the United Autosports Oreca 07-Gibson) was 16 years and 117 days old when he competed at Le Mans, beating the record set by Matt McMurry in 2014.

== Pre-race balance of performance changes ==
In the balance of performance adjustments, the Alpine A480-Gibson received a performance increase with an extra 13 hp (9.7 kW) of power and weight; the Toyota GR010 Hybrid and the Glickenhaus SCG 007 LMH cars remained unchanged from the preceding 6 Hours of Spa-Francorchamps. The LMGTE Pro-class Chevrolet Corvette C8.R had its performance slowed by an 0.8-millimetre (0.031 in) engine-air-restrictor diameter reduction. The Ferrari 488 GTE Evo was equipped with a revised power curve it had since the WEC season began, and the Porsche 911 RSR-19 received a 3-litre (0.66 imp gal; 0.79 US gal) fuel-capacity increase in both LMGTE categories. Aston Martin's LMGTE Am-category Vantage AMR had its fuel capacity decreased by 1 L (0.22 imp gal; 0.26 US gal).

== Testing ==
All entrants participated in eight hours of mandatory testing on 5 June, divided into two sessions. The testing took place in mainly-dry weather, with a brief period of light rain. Driver Paul di Resta helped Pierson in one of the United Autosports Oreca cars, while the team waited for Alex Lynn and Oliver Jarvis to arrive at Le Mans from Detroit.

José María López set the pace of both sessions of testing in the No. 7 Toyota GR010 Hybrid.

The morning session was led by Toyota with a 3:31.626 lap from José María López's No. 7 entry with 17 minutes left, demoting Dumas' No. 708 Glickenhaus entry to second. Hartley made the No. 8 Toyota third-quickest, with Franck Mailleux's sister Glickenhaus No. 709 car fourth and the No. 36 Alpine of Vaxivière fifth. In LMP2, Jota's No. 38 car driven by Will Stevens lapped fastest at 3:33.964 during the third hour; United Autosport USA's No. 22 entry of Phil Hanson was second. The quickest Pro/Am sub-class entry was Mathias Beche's No. 13 TDS Racing car in third, and Alex Brundle's No. 34 Inter Europol Competition car was fourth in class. Corvette were first and second in LMGTE Pro, with Milner's No. 64 car faster than Nicky Catsburg's No. 63 sister entry by almost two-tenths of a second. The highest-placed Porsche was Gianmaria Bruni's No. 91 car in third, with the best Ferrari the privateer Riley Motorsports entry of Felipe Fraga placing fourth. Michelle Gatting's No. 85 Iron Dames Ferrari led in LMGTE Am ahead of the No. 52 AF Corse, LMGTE Pro's slowest entry. Some cars went off the track during the session, sustaining damage; it was stopped after ten minutes when the No. 65 Panis car of Julien Canal lost a wheel at the Daytona chicane on the Mulsanne Straight and was returned to the pit lane.

Dumas set the early pace in the second test session before López improved to a 3:29.986 lap with almost 90 minutes left to go. Hirakawa's No. 8 Toyota was third, and Mailleux was fourth in Glickenhaus' No. 709 car. Late in the session, López briefly went off the circuit during a car-safety procedure at Mulsanne Corner and forced the testing to end early. Filipe Albuquerque improved the fastest LMP2 lap to a 3:32.099 in the No. 22 United Autosports USA entry, and was fifth overall. The No. 38 Jota car of António Félix da Costa fell to second, and Lynn placed third in United Autosports' No. 23 sister vehicle. Alexander Sims improved the No. 64 Corvette's quickest lap to top LMGTE Pro, ahead of Davide Rigon's No. 51 AF Corse Ferrari and Frédéric Makowiecki's No. 91 Porsche. Ferrari were first and second in LMGTE Am, with Kessel Racing's No. 57 car of Mikkel Jensen leading JMW Motorsport's Renger van der Zande by four-tenths of a second. Safety cars were required for Charlie Fagg's stopped No. 777 D'station Racing Aston Martin at the pit lane exit into turn one due to a sensor fault, and the No. 88 Dempsey Proton Porsche driven by Jan Heylen was beached in the gravel entering the Porsche Curves with punctured front tyres.

=== After testing ===
After testing, the ACO and FIA again altered the LMGTE balance of performance. The LMGTE Ferrari 488 GTE Evo received a 0.07-bar (7.0 kPa) decrease in turbocharger boost pressure curve across all revolutions, a 3-litre (0.66 imp gal; 0.79 US gal) fuel-capacity reduction from 87 litres (19 imp gal; 23 US gal) to 84 litres (18 imp gal; 22 US gal), and minimum rear-wing angle changes to decrease performance. The Porsche 911 RSR-19 received a minimum rear-wing angle change to increase performance. The Pro-class Chevrolet Corvette C8.R and the Am-category Aston Martin Vantage AMR had no performance changes.

== Practice ==
The first three-hour practice session was held on the afternoon of 8 June. Quick laps were initially disregarded as teams tried to conduct race simulations. Light rain had fallen on the circuit, and the session was declared wet before cars on slick tyres removed water. Hartley's No. 8 Toyota lapped fastest at 3:29.441 in the last 20 minutes. Mailleux's No. 709 Glickenhaus was second. Glickenhaus' No. 708 sister entry of Pipo Derani was third, ahead of Kamui Kobayashi's No. 7 Toyota. Lynn's No. 23 United Autosports car was quickest in LMP2 and fourth overall at 3:30.238 in the session's final minutes. Félix da Costa put the No. 38 Jota car second just before practice ended, with Prema Orlen Team's No. 9 entry of Robert Kubica third. In LMGTE Pro, Corvette maintained its test-day pace with the No. 63 entry fastest after a lap by Antonio García demoted teammate Milner (in the No. 64 vehicle) to second. Porsche led in LMGTE Am, with the fastest class lap coming from the No. 79 WeatherTech Racing car driven by Julien Andlauer; brand mate Ben Barker's No. 86 GR Racing car was second. Several cars went off the track during the session. The full-course yellow procedure was deployed for Ryan Cullen's No. 10 Vector Sport car, which stopped in the Tertre Rouge S-curves. The session ended early when Steven Thomas damaged the No. 45 Algarve Pro Racing car's front left corner on the left tyre wall entering the Ford chicane.

Romain Dumas lapped fastest overall on the first day of practice in the No. 709 Glickenhaus SCG 007 LMH.

Algarve Pro installed a new chassis on the No. 45 car, which missed qualifying. Dumas's No. 708 Glickenhaus car set the day's fastest time of 3:28.900 24 minutes into the second, two-hour evening session, 0.348 seconds faster than Kobayashi's second-place No. 7 Toyota. Toyota's No. 8 sister car was third after a lap by Hartley, and Ryan Briscoe's No. 709 Glickenhaus was fourth-quickest. René Rast recorded the quickest LMP2 lap at 3:33.119 in the No. 31 WRT vehicle, with Albuquerque's No. 22 United Autosports USA entry second. Dries Vanthoor was third with a late lap in Team WRT's No. 32 car. Fabio Scherer stopped the No. 43 Inter Europol car on the start-finish straight with right front suspension damage from mounting the sausage kerbs at the Ford chicane; a flatbed truck returned the car to the pit lane. Catsburg kept Corvette first in LMGTE Pro, as Makowiecki moved the No. 91 Porsche to second. LMGTE Am was led by Mikkel O. Pedersen's No. 46 Project 1 Racing Porsche with a lap set with five minutes remaining, leading Heylen's No. 88 Dempsey-Proton car.

Before the third practice session, a balance of performance adjustment gave the Alpine A480-Gibson 7 kW (9.4 hp) more power and 11 MJ (3.1 kWh) more energy per stint for a total power output of 427 kW (573 hp). The Toyota GR010 Hybrid and Glickenhaus SCG 007 LMH had no performance changes.

The third practice session, for three hours on the afternoon of 9 June, saw Kobayashi lap fastest early in the No. 7 Toyota; Hartley's No. 8 car was second. Both Glickenhaus cars were third and fourth, with Pla's No. 708 entry ahead of Briscoe's No. 709 sister car. Hirakawa stopped between the Indianapolis and Arnage corners with a hybrid problem, but slowly returned to the pit lane for a half-hour of repairs. LMP2 was led by Albuquerque's No. 22 United Autosports USA car, which was less than one-tenth of a second faster than teammate Lynn's No. 23 vehicle. They were followed by WRT's No. 31 car, driven by Robin Frijns. Tandy's No. 64 Corvette led LMGTE Pro, and Richard Lietz's No. 91 Porsche remained second in class. Pedersen kept the No. 46 Project 1 Porsche atop LMGTE Am, with the No. 33 TF Sport Aston Martin driven by Henrique Chaves slower by two-tenths of a second. Accidents by Philippe Cimadomo's No. 13 TDS Racing entry (against the right concrete barrier at the Porsche Curves from contact with Sean Gelael's No. 31 WRT car), the No. 39 Graff Racing car driven by Sebastien Page (spinning into the barrier exiting the Indianapolis turn) and Alexander West's No. 59 Inception Racing Ferrari (which struck the Ford Chicane tyre wall) disrupted the session.

The final two-hour practice session took place on the night of 9 June. Toyota led from the start with López's No. 7 entry going fastest overall at 3:28.322, 0.362 seconds quicker than Buemi's No. 8 sister car. The Glickenhaus team followed in third and fourth, with Derani's No. 708 entry faster than teammate Richard Westbrook's No. 708 car. Lynn's No. 23 United Autosport car led in LMP2 at 3:32.226, ahead of Panis Racing's Job van Uitert and Jonathan Aberdein's No. 28 Jota entry. Graff driver David Droux, in their No. 39 car, went across the gravel and crashed lightly against the tyre barrier at Mulsanne corner. Félix da Costa's No. 38 Jota car and Alexandre Cougnaud's No. 3 DKR Engineering entry collided at the Ford chicane, sending Cougnaud sideways into the tyre wall. Cougnaud drove across the circuit to the pit lane for repairs. Corvette continued their fast pace, with Catsburg lapping quickest in the No. 63 car in LMGTE Pro; the No. 64 sister C8R driven by Milner was second by 0.021 seconds. Dempsey-Proton led LMGTE Am with Harry Tincknell's No. 77 Porsche ahead of teammate Heylen in the second-place No. 88 entry.

== Qualifying ==
Divided into two sessions, the first one-hour qualifying session set the race's starting order except for the fastest six vehicles in each class; they qualified for a half-hour shootout, "Le Mans Hyperpole", which determined pole position in all four classes. Cars were placed in starting order by category, with every Hypercar at the front of the field regardless of lap time, followed by LMP2, LMGTE Pro and LMGTE Am. The vehicles were placed with the six qualifying Hyperpole cars ordered by fastest Hyperpole-session lap time first, followed by the remaining non-qualifying class vehicles by fastest lap time set during the first qualifying session.

The No. 93 Proton Competition Porsche 911 RSR-19 was crashed by actor Michael Fassbender in qualifying.

Each of the five entries in the Hypercar category progressed to Hyperpole, with the fastest lap a 3:27.247 recorded by Kobayashi's No. 7 Toyota early before light rain fell during the second half of the session. In LMP2, the qualifiers were Frijns' No. 31 WRT car with entries from Jota's Félix da Costa, Norman Nato for RealTeam by WRT, the United Autosports pair of Lynn and Albuquerque and Prema's Louis Delétraz. LMGTE Pro saw the six factory entrants advance to Hyperpole. The No. 92 Porsche driven by Laurens Vanthoor was fastest, ahead of García's No. 63 Corvette, Porsche's No. 91 car driven by Makowiecki, the No. 64 sister Corvette of Tandy and the AF Corse Ferrari entries driven by Calado (No. 51) and Antonio Fuoco (No. 52). LMGTE Am saw Nicki Thiim's No. 98 NorthWest AMR, Jensen's Kessel Racing Ferrari, the No. 54 AF Corse Ferrari driven by Nick Cassidy, Rahel Frey's No. 85 Iron Dames Ferrari, Dempsey-Proton Racing's Tincknell in its No. 77 Porsche and the No. 61 AF Corse Ferrari driven by Vincent Abril. Actor Michael Fassbender lost control of the rear of Proton Competition's No. 93 Porsche braking for the first Mulsanne chicane due to a front puncture, and struck the Armco barrier with the front. Fassbender was unhurt, and the session was stopped for about 12 minutes to recover the damaged car. The crash resulted in the Proton Competition mechanics replacing the chassis on the No. 93 Porsche.

In Hyperpole, Hartley set the fastest lap (3:24.408) in the No. 8 Toyota for Toyota's sixth consecutive pole position at Le Mans late in the session on worn tyres after being slowed by traffic in the Porsche Curves earlier on. Kobayashi qualified the No. 7 sister Toyota second after his fastest lap was deleted, reinstated and then invalidated again for a track-limits infringement at the Tertre Rouge corner. The No. 36 Alpine qualified third after a lap by Lapierre, and the Glickenhaus entries of Briscoe (No. 709) and Pla (No. 708) were fourth and fifth. The LMP2 pole position was taken by Frjins' No. 31 WRT entry, with a time of 3:28.394. Nato's No. 41 Realteam entry was second, holding the category pole until Frijns' lap. Following in third to sixth were the lead United Autosports car of Albuquerque, the Jota entry of Félix da Costa, Delétraz's Prema car and Lynn's sister United Autosports car (after one of Lynn's laps was invalidated). Corvette Racing took the first two positions in LMGTE Pro with Tandy's No. 63 entry on category pole, with the only sub-3:50 class lap from his teammate García's No. 64 car. The two Porsches were third and fourth, with Makowiecki's No. 91 car faster than Laurens Vanthoor's No. 92 vehicle. Abril took pole position in LMGTE Am in AF Corse's No. 61 Ferrari early in the session from Jensen's No. 57 Kessel entry and Tincknell's Dempsey-Proton Porsche after a lap by Frey in Iron Dames' No. 85 vehicle was invalidated for violating track limits.

The No. 13 TDS Racing x Vaillante Oreca 07 was moved from the LMP2 Pro/Am subclass to the main LMP2 category after Nyck de Vries replaced the banned Philippe Cimadomo.

After qualifying, stewards barred Cimadomo from racing at race director Eduardo Freitas's recommendation for his and other entrants' safety due to his "not driving to the standard required to safely participate in the remainder of the event" after his involvement in three incidents during free practice. (Note: Cimadomo was involved in an incident with the No. 63 Chevrolet Corvette C8.R at the Dunlop Chicane during the first practice session, and almost caused an accident at the pit-lane exit during the session.) Cimadomo was replaced by Formula E champion Nyck de Vries, and TDS' No. 13 car was moved from the LMP2 Pro/Am subclass to the main LMP2 category because De Vries held a platinum racing licence. The FIA and ACO revised the balance of performance, increasing the LMGTE Ferrari 488 GTE Evo's turbocharger boost pressure and decreasing the A480's engine power by 13 hp (9.7 kW) and a loss of 32 MJ (8.9 kWh) of energy allowance per stint.

=== Qualifying results ===
Pole positions in each class are denoted in bold.

Final qualifying classification
Pos.	Class	No.	Team	Qualifying	Hyperpole	Grid
**1**	**Hypercar**	**8**	**Toyota Gazoo Racing**	3:40.842	**3:24.408**	1
2	Hypercar	7	Toyota Gazoo Racing	3:27.247	3:24.828	2
3	Hypercar	36	Alpine Elf Team	3:29.656	3:24.850	3
4	Hypercar	709	Glickenhaus Racing	3:27.978	3:25.841	4
5	Hypercar	708	Glickenhaus Racing	3:27.355	3:26.359	5
**6**	**LMP2**	**31**	**WRT**	3:29.898	**3:28.394**	6
7	LMP2	22	United Autosports USA	3:30.639	3:30.070	7
8	LMP2	38	Jota	3:30.124	3:30.373	8
9	LMP2	41	RealTeam by WRT	3:30.440	3:30.522	9
10	LMP2	9	Prema Orlen Team	3:30.651	3:31.115	10
11	LMP2	23	United Autosports USA	3:30.568	3:31.596	11
12	LMP2	1	Richard Mille Racing Team	3:31.368		12
13	LMP2	65	Panis Racing	3:31.382		13
14	LMP2	5	Team Penske	3:31.462		13
15	LMP2	32	Team WRT	3:31.808		15
16	LMP2	30	Duqueine Team	3:32.000		16
17	LMP2	37	Cool Racing	3:32.008		17
18	LMP2	28	Jota	3:32.138		18
19	LMP2	48	IDEC Sport	3:32.285		19
20	LMP2	34	Inter Europol Competition	3:32.549		20
21	**LMP2 Pro-Am**	**24**	**Nielsen Racing**	**3:32.956**		21
22	LMP2 Pro-Am	35	Ultimate	3:33.463		22
23	LMP2 Pro-Am	44	ARC Bratislava	3:33.480		23
24	LMP2 Pro-Am	39	Graff Racing	3:33.483		24
25	LMP2 Pro-Am	3	DKR Engineering	3:34.524		25
26	LMP2 Pro-Am	47	Algarve Pro Racing	3:36.371		26
27	LMP2 Pro-Am	83	AF Corse	3:36.548		27
28	LMP2 Pro-Am	27	CD Sport	3:38.136		28
29	LMP2	43	Inter Europol Competition	3:38.491		29
30	LMP2	10	Vector Sport	No Time		62
31	LMP2	13	TDS Racing x Vaillante	No Time		30
32	LMP2 Pro-Am	45	Algarve Pro Racing	No Time		61
33	**LMGTE Pro**	**64**	**Corvette Racing**	3:51.491	**3:49.985**	31
34	LMGTE Pro	63	Corvette Racing	3:51.132	3:50.177	32
35	LMGTE Pro	91	Porsche GT Team	3:51.382	3:50.377	33
36	LMGTE Pro	92	Porsche GT Team	3:50.999	3:50.522	34
37	LMGTE Pro	52	AF Corse	3:51.614	3:51.779	35
38	LMGTE Pro	51	AF Corse	3:51.502	3:51.816	36
39	LMGTE Pro	74	Riley Motorsports	4:03.311		37
40	**LMGTE Am**	**61**	**AF Corse**	3:54.316	**3:52.594**	38
41	LMGTE Am	57	Kessel Racing	3:53.489	3:52.751	39
42	LMGTE Am	77	Dempsey-Proton Racing	3:54.224	3:53.006	40
43	LMGTE Am	98	NorthWest AMR	3:52.559	3:53.578	41
44	LMGTE Am	54	AF Corse	3:53.690	3:53.757	42
45	LMGTE Am	85	Iron Dames	3:54.081	3:53.869	43
46	LMGTE Am	86	GR Racing	3:54.323		44
47	LMGTE Am	56	Team Project 1	3:54.510		45
48	LMGTE Am	46	Team Project 1	3:54.533		46
49	LMGTE Am	79	WeatherTech Racing	3:54.912		47
50	LMGTE Am	99	Hardpoint Motorsport	3:55.076		48
51	LMGTE Am	59	Inception Racing	3:55.162		49
52	LMGTE Am	21	AF Corse	3:55.308		50
53	LMGTE Am	55	Spirit of Race	3:55.617		51
54	LMGTE Am	75	Iron Lynx	3:55.672		52
55	LMGTE Am	66	JMW Motorsport	3:56.008		53
56	LMGTE Am	777	D'station Racing	3:56.437		54
57	LMGTE Am	88	Dempsey-Proton Racing	3:56.516		55
58	LMGTE Am	33	TF Sport	3:57.044		56
59	LMGTE Am	60	Iron Lynx	4:05.633		57
60	LMGTE Am	93	Proton Competition	4:07.907		58
61	LMGTE Am	80	Iron Lynx	4:23.223		59
62	LMGTE Am	71	Spirit of Race	No Time		60

== Warm-up ==
A 15-minute warm-up session was held on the morning of 11 June, and a number of drivers did not have a fast lap due to incidents during the session. The No. 7 Toyota of Mike Conway lapped fastest at 3:31.236 seconds, ahead of the fastest LMP2 entry (driven by Rast) in WRT's No. 31 car; Buemi's No. 8 sister Toyota was 2.313 seconds slower in third, and second in Hypercar. The fastest LMGTE Pro lap was 3:54.788, set by Garcia in the No. 63 Corvette, and Toni Vilander's No. 21 AF Corse Ferrari paced LMGTE Am. Mailleux appeared to lose control of the No. 709 Glickenhaus leaving the Mulsanne turn due to a malfunctioning traction-control sensor before stopping on the right hand side of the circuit. A driveline fault slowed Tandy's No. 64 Corvette between the Mulsanne and Indianapolis corners, necessitating a pit stop. Nico Müller beaching the No. 10 Vector Sport car in the gravel at the Indianapolis corner and Laurents Hörr losing control of the No. 3 DKR entry at the Dunlop Chicane prompted a full-course-yellow period.

== Race ==
=== Start and early hours ===
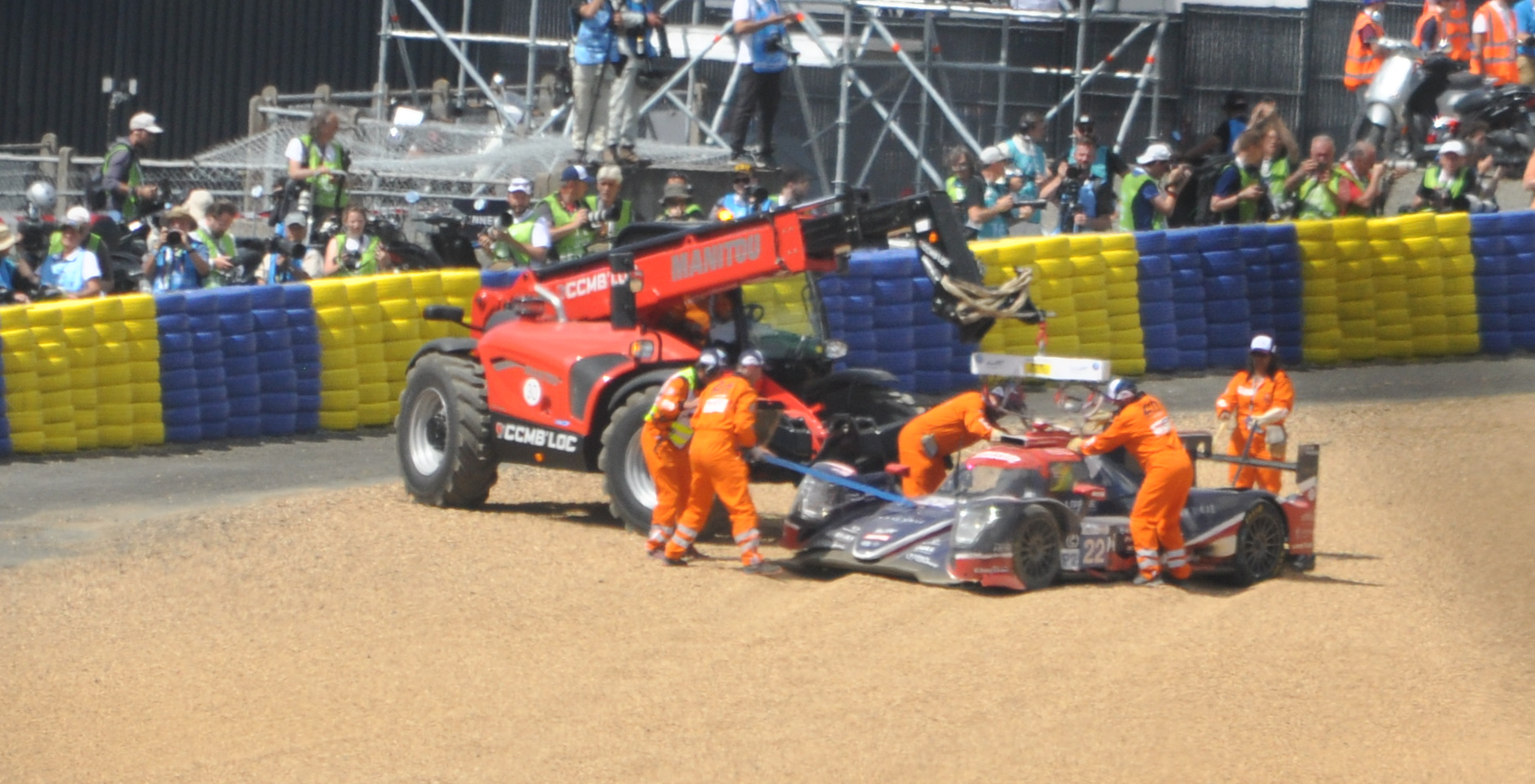
United Autosports USA's No. 22 Oreca was involved in a first-lap accident with both WRT entries.

The weather was dry at the start, with an air temperature of 13 to 26 °C (55 to 79 °F) and a track temperature of 17.5 to 57.5 °C (63.5 to 135.5 °F). There were 244,200 spectators in attendance. The French tricolour was waved at 16:00 CEST by TotalEnergies CEO Patrick Pouyanné to begin the race, which was led by the pole-sitting Buemi. Will Owen's No. 22 United Autosports USA Oreca, pinched between the WRT cars of Ferdinand Habsburg and LMP2-class pole-sitter Rast at the first corner, was sent into the gravel trap. Owen required recovery by crane to return to the pit lane for repairs (which cost him two laps), and Habsburg's No. 41 car sustained front-end damage and a right rear puncture. The stewards deemed Rast responsible for the accident, and imposed a one-minute stop-and-go penalty. This moved Kubica's No. 9 Prema entry on the inside from fifth to the LMP2 lead. In LMGTE Am, Abril was unable to retain the No. 61 AF Corse Ferrari's class lead; Tincknell used the end of a slow zone at turn one to overtake Jensen and Abril in Dempsey's No. 77 Porsche.

The race's first hour ended with Alessio Picariello's No. 99 Hardpoint Porsche taking the LMGTE Am lead from Project 1's No. 46 car, driven by Matteo Cairoli. Félix da Costa's No. 38 Jota entry became the new LMP2 leader after passing Prema's No. 9 Prema during the first pit-stop cycle. Buemi could not build up a large-enough lead over his teammate Conway due to an oversteer, and relinquished his overall lead to the No. 7 sister car after their pit stops; Conway's stop was faster. Tandy had trouble downshifting for the Mulsanne corner and drove across the roundabout to rejoin the circuit, but forfeited the No. 64 Corvette's hold on the LMGTE Pro lead to García's No. 63 sister Corvette. The LMGTE Am class became a battle between the No. 99 Hardpoint Porsche and the No. 79 WeatherTech Racing Porsche, and Andlauer took the category lead by passing Picariello on the inside at the Indianapolis corner. Glickenhaus' No. 709 car, driven by Mailleux, was forced to the garage for three minutes for mechanics to replace a faulty engine sensor which was detected by telemetry just before the start of the third hour and fell to 10th place.

Dane Cameron and Felipe Nasr brought the No. 5 Team Penske Oreca car from ninth to second in LMP2 by the end of the third hour, ahead of Lorenzo Colombo's third-place No. 9 Prema car which drew to within a second of Nasr. Lapierre was observed speeding in a slow zone, and the No. 36 Alpine received a drive-through penalty which dropped the car from the lead lap. Team Project's No. 46 Porsche, driven by Nicolas Leutwiler, was beached in the Mulsanne Corner gravel and required extraction to get to the pit lane before the car was retired with irreparable ride height damage. The No. 7 Toyota lost the overall race lead to its No. 8 sister car when López went across the gravel at the second Mulsanne chicane on an out-lap. Vaxivière later brought the Alpine into the garage to repair an electronic clutch fault; the 13 1/2 minutes of clutch bleeding dropped the car out of contention. Porsche began closing on the Corvette LMGTE Pro leaders – who were lapping faster in the cooler conditions – and overtook the No. 64 Corvette, which had downshifting problems after Tandy locked its brakes at the Mulsanne turn.

Sims brought the No. 64 Corvette back to second in LMGTE Pro, passing Laurens Vanthoor's No. 92 Porsche on the inside at the second Mulsanne chicane. In the sixth hour, Nasr's No. 5 Penske car lost its hold on second in LMP2 to Ricky Taylor's No. 37 Cool Racing vehicle when debris caused left-front-tyre delamination which damaged the car's left front corner. An unscheduled two-minute, 15-second pit stop dropped the car to third in LMP2 after brake-duct and front-end replacements. The No. 8 Toyota lost the overall lead to Kobayashi's No. 7 sister Toyota when Hirakawa was impeded by a GT car after exiting the pit lane. Corvette lost their hold on the top two places in LMGTE Pro when Tandy brought the No. 64 car into the garage for unscheduled brake repairs and García's No. 63 entry was forced slowly into the garage for a left rear suspension replacement. This promoted Christensen's No. 92 Porsche to the LMGTE Pro lead and Bruni's No. 91 sister car to second.

=== Night to morning ===
As night fell, Pla lost control of the third-place No. 708 Glickenhaus and damaged its left rear suspension on the right guardrail leaving the Tertre Rouge corner after he struck the kerb. Pla drove the vehicle slowly to the pit lane for repairs, relinquishing the car's hold on third to Mailleux's sister Glickenhaus. The No. 7 Toyota had a slow pit stop for a tyre change and driver switch (from Kobayashi to Conway), and Buemi's No. 8 Toyota retook the lead. Conway then reclaimed the lead, passing Buemi into the Daytona Chicane on the Mulsanne Straight. Buemi returned the No. 8 Toyota to the overall lead ahead of Conway's No. 7 entry to begin the ninth hour, extending the car's lead to half a minute when a slow zone was imposed to dry a coolant spill between the Tertre Rouge turn and the first Mulsanne Straight chicane. The No. 709 LMGTE Am-class D'station Racing Aston Martin of Charlie Fagg retired with chassis and wishbone damage. The category became a two-car battle for the lead between the No. 79 WeatherTech Porsche and the No. 33 TF Sport Aston Martin, driven by Marco Sørensen, after Sørensen lapped faster than Paul Dalla Lana's No. 98 NorthWest AMR entry.

The No. 31 WRT Oreca recovered from its early stop-and-go penalty to move to second in LMP2 after a quick stint by Frijns before Delétraz's No. 9 Prema passed Frijns' co-driver Gelael on the main straight by forcing Gelael towards the pit-lane barrier. Hirakawa's No. 8 Toyota led López's No. 7 car by almost 19 seconds at half distance, and both cars were two laps ahead of Briscoe's third-place No. 709 Glickenhaus. Jota's No. 38 Oreca, driven by Félix da Costa, still led LMP2 with a one-lap advantage over Prema's No. 9 entry of Delétraz due to the No. 38 team's fast pace and slow zones. Porsche's No. 92 team led the No. 64 Corvette by 100 seconds in LMGTE Pro. TF Sport's No. 33 Aston Martin, driven by Chaves, took the LMGTE Am lead from WeatherTech's No. 79 Porsche when driver Cooper MacNeil lost a minute in one lap for a pit stop just before half distance. The No. 8 Toyota lost the lead it had held for 86 laps when a slow zone was deployed to recover West's retired LMGTE Am-category No. 59 Inception Ferrari from the Mulsanne Straight, catching Buemi off-guard and allowing Conway's No. 7 car to pass during a pit-stop cycle. Porsche brought the No. 92 car into the garage for routine brake disc and pad switches, and lost the LMGTE Pro lead it had held for 104 laps to Pier Guidi's No. 51 AF Corse Ferrari.

LMGTE Pro became a close battle between Milner's No. 64 Corvette and Pier Guidi's No. 51 AF Corse Ferrari, with both drivers close for multiple laps with Porsche's No. 92 RSR (driven by Christensen). Milner drafted past Pier Guidi on the Mulsanne Straight and the outside of the Daytona chicane to return to the category lead. The No. 92 Porsche left the battle for the class lead when Christensen understeered into the gravel at the Mulsanne corner. Christensen had a right-front puncture when he built up speed on the approach to the Indianapolis corner, and heavy damage to the car's front required him to drive slowly to the pit lane for repairs. This moved Sims' No. 64 Corvette back into the category lead, with Daniel Serra's No. 51 AF Corse Ferrari second. Before the 16th hour ended, López stopped the No. 7 Toyota at the exit of the right-hand Arnage corner with a front-axle motor–generator issue that made him perform a power cycle to restart the car and return to the pit lane for further troubleshooting; he lost a lap and the lead to Hartley's No. 8 sister Toyota. Brendan Iribe was caught off-guard under braking for the Daytona chicane and struck the left-side Armco barrier with the front of the No. 56 Team Project 1 Porsche hard enough to retire the car, which was third in LMGTE Am. Iribe was unhurt and extricated himself from the car.

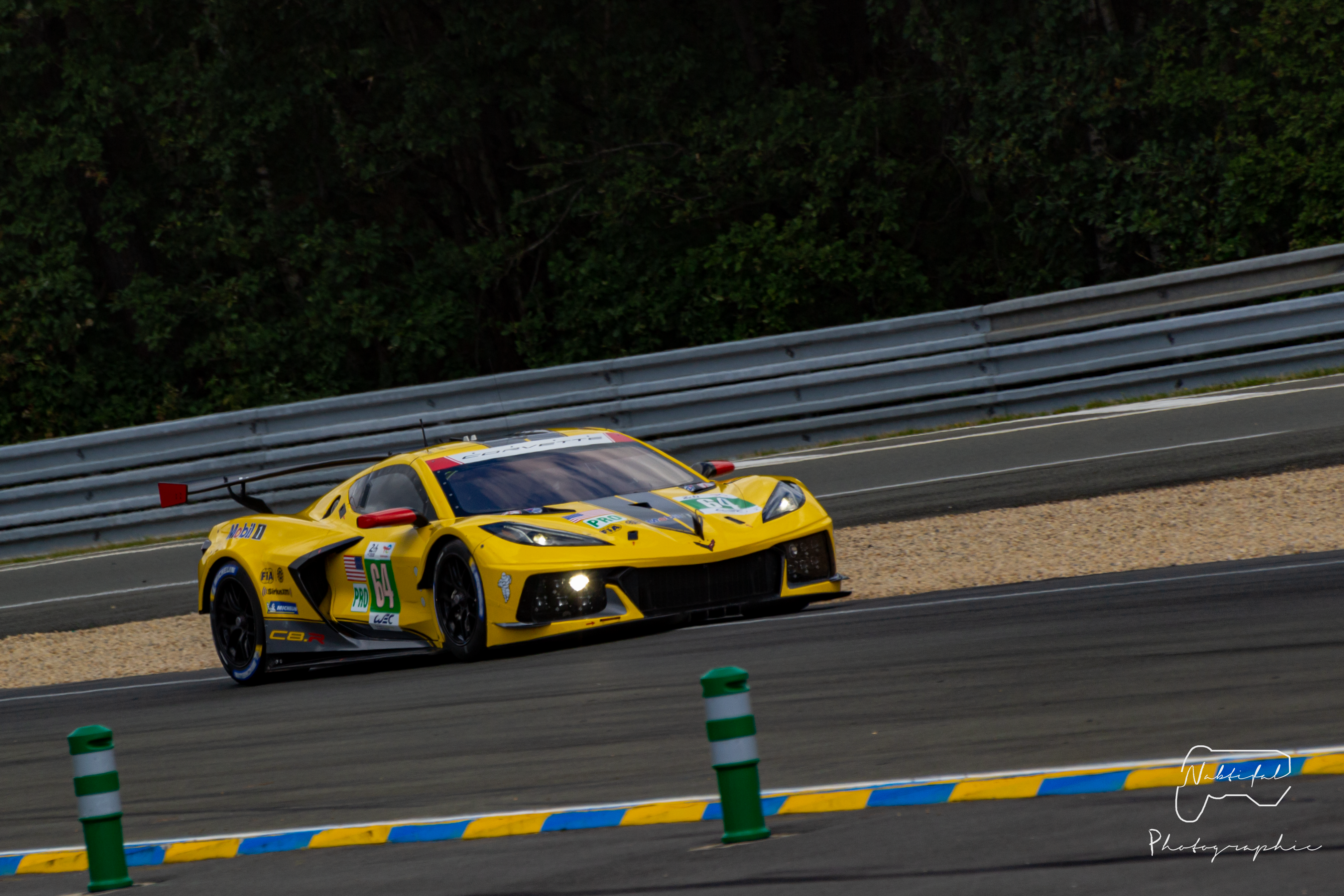
The No. 64 Chevrolet Corvette C8.R retired from the LMGTE Pro lead after being sent into the barrier by the No. 83 AF Corse LMP2 car.

In the 18th hour, just after the No. 63 Corvette was retired with rear-end mechanical damage, François Perrodo's No. 83 AF Corse Oreca was sandwiched between Sims' No. 64 Corvette and John Falb's No. 47 Algarve Pro Oreca on the Mulsanne Straight after the first chicane when he veered left. Perrodo made slight left-side contact with Sims, who was sent into the left-side barrier at high speed; the damaged No. 64 Corvette was retired. Perrodo, who received a three-minute stop-and-go penalty for causing the crash, slowly entered the pit lane for rear-suspension repairs; Calado's No. 51 AF Corse Ferrari took the LMGTE Pro lead, with Makowiecki's No. 91 Porsche second. Frijns lost control of the No. 31 WRT Oreca, going onto the gravel at the exit of Indianapolis turn and crashing into the left-side Armco barrier. Since the blue impact light came on, Frijns was transported to the medical centre; he was unhurt. The accident forced the No. 31 car's retirement and the safety car's only deployment, to enable repairs to the Armco wall. The safety cars were recalled after fifteen minutes, and the first two cars in LMGTE Pro were together; Pier Guidi lost the No. 51 AF Corse Ferrari's advantage to Makowiecki's No. 91 Porsche. Pier Guidi had a right-rear puncture entering the Porsche Curves which forced an unscheduled pit stop, promoting the No. 91 Porsche to the LMGTE Pro lead. The safety-car period reduced the LMP2-leading No. 38 Jota Oreca's gap from one lap to a half-lap, because it had to remain in the pit lane and wait for the nearest safety car.

=== Afternoon to finish ===
Claudio Schiavoni, in the No. 85 Iron Lynx Ferrari, collided with an LMP2 entry and struck the left tyre barrier leaving the Porsche Curves with four minutes left in the 21st hour. Schiavoni was unhurt, but the Ferrari was retired. The second-place No. 9 Prema car of Colombo and (later) Kubica in LMP2 closed the gap to Roberto González's class-leading No. 38 Jota car, while the No. 28 sister Jota entry of Aberdein in third made an unscheduled pit stop to repair a slow puncture. Sebastian Priaulx brought the No. 77 Dempsey-Proton Porsche into the pit lane from third in LMGTE Am to repair a failed lower front wishbone, losing his position to David Pittard's No. 98 Aston Martin. Thomas Merrill miscalculated entering the Porsche Curves in WeatherTech's No. 79 Porsche and entered the gravel trap; he avoided striking the barriers, and continued without relinquishing his car's hold on second in LMGTE Am.

Brendon Hartley driving the race-winning No. 8 Toyota GR010 Hybrid to the pit lane for the podium ceremony

Hartley maintained the overall lead his No. 8 Toyota had held for the previous 125 laps, and finished first after 380 laps; it was Buemi's fourth Le Mans victory, Hartley's third, Hirakawa's first and Toyota's fifth in succession. They finished two minutes and 1.222 seconds ahead of No. 7 sister Toyota; Glickenhaus made the overall Le Mans podium for the first time in third, with its No. 709 car five laps down. Jota's No. 38 Oreca won LMP2, leading for all but 15 laps, to finish two minutes and 21 seconds ahead of the debuting second-place No. 9 Prema car. It was Jota's third category victory (their first since 2017) and the maiden LMP2 Le Mans win for Félix da Costa, González and Stevens. The No. 28 sister Jota car completed the LMP2 podium in third. The No. 45 Algarve Pro team of James Allen, René Binder and Thomas won the LMP2 Pro/Am subclass by one lap over the No. 24 Nielsen Racing car driven by Matt Bell, Ben Hanley and Rodrigo Sales. In the final LMGTE Pro race at Le Mans, Porsche had their first class victory since 2018 with the No. 91 RSR leading the No. 51 AF Corse Ferrari by 42.684 seconds. Aston Martin won LMGTE Am, with the No. 33 TF Sport car leading for the final 105 laps in the first category victory for Chaves, Ben Keating and Sørensen. WeatherTech Racing placed second in the class, 44.446 seconds behind. A record 53 of the 62 starting cars finished the race.

== Post-race ==
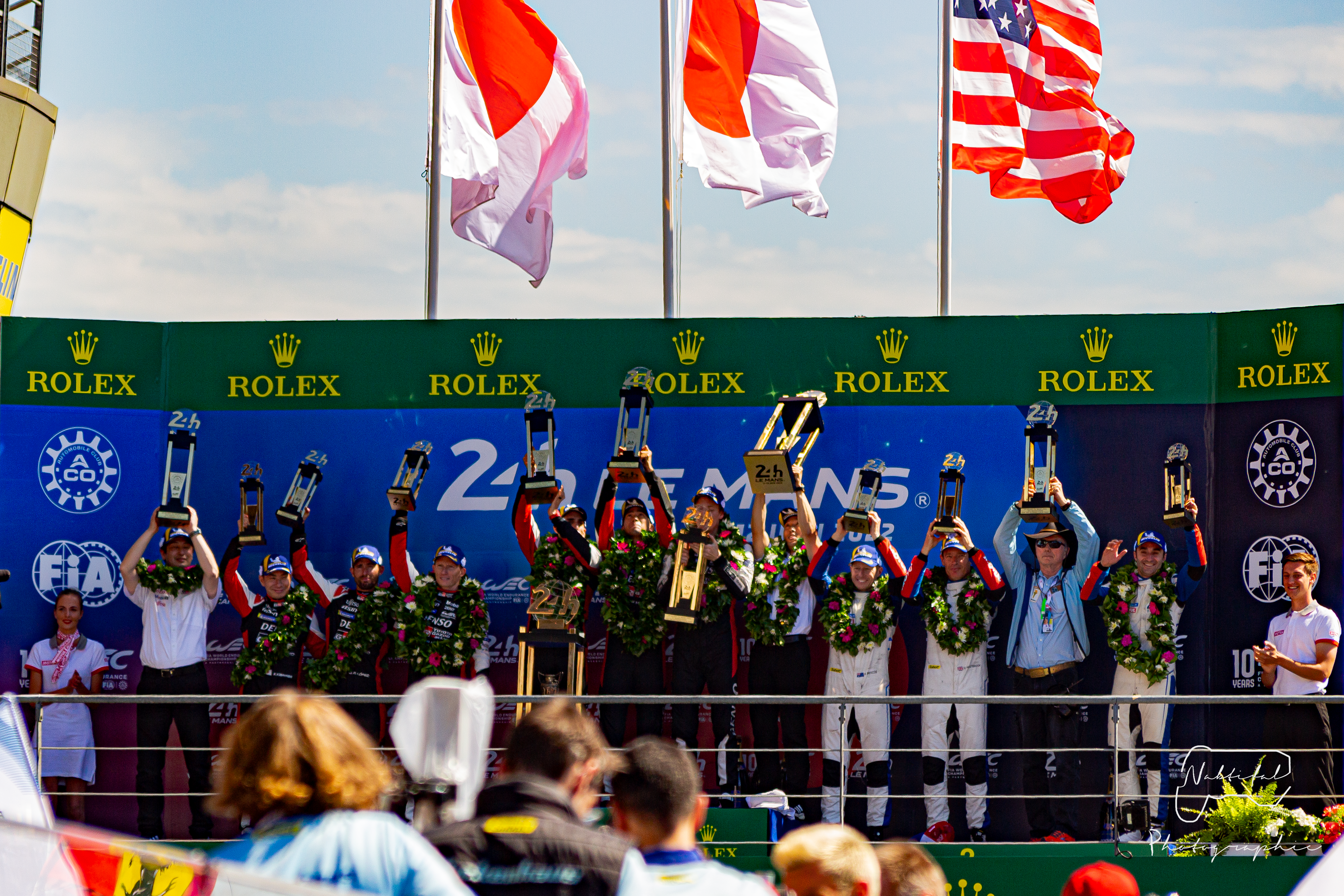
The post-race podium ceremony, with the overall top three teams

The top three teams in each of the four classes appeared on the podium to collect their trophies and spoke to the media at individual press conferences. Hirakawa said that he did not expect to win the race in his first year with Toyota, and his next objective was to win as many as possible. Hartley admitted being emotional about winning and said it was an "amazing race because we were pushing each other so hard. We were giving it everything: there was nothing left on the table because it was so evenly matched." López said that making a car run perfectly was difficult. Toyota's technical director, Pascal Vasselon, called the speed of the Glickenhaus cars "remarkable" given the team's inexperience. Briscoe called Glickenhaus' podium finish "a massive accomplishment", but was disappointed at not matching Toyota's pace. Westbrook said that finishing third felt like a victory, and Mailleux described a podium result as "so unreal".

Félix da Costa said about the LMP2 win, "The win is special, but the way to get there takes a lot. It's a collective victory." González said it was Jota's dream to win, something they had prepared for during the previous three years. Bruni said that luck was a factor in winning LMGTE Pro when the Corvette and the No. 92 Porsche encountered issues: "This is part of racing. Sometimes it works well, other times it works bad. For sure they were not lucky, Corvette was unlucky. In the end Le Mans chooses [whether] you win or not. This is the special thing of Le Mans. Sometimes she recognises you, other times not." Lietz said a lot of misfortune and difficulty in the preceding two years prevented Porsche from achieving a decent result and that it felt good for them to be lucky again. Keating said that his LMGTE Am win gave him a "little bit of vindication" after a 2019 post-race fuel disqualification from first place: "Somebody asked me what it feels like to win Le Mans, I told them this is my second! Everyone knows we won it in 2019, the difference is this one will be in the record books. There's something special about that".

Perrodo and AF Corse team principal Amato Ferrari visited Corvette Racing's garage to apologise for the accident which caused the No. 64 car's retirement. Perrodo said that he had no excuse: "I made a terrible mistake. It's like a small movement with huge consequences. So I had to apologise to Corvette. It's the least I can do. I know that nothing will make them feel better at this stage. It's horrible. It's horrible for me, for them, but of course particularly for them." Sims said, "It's never nice when things happen outside of your control, but we're on track with 60 other cars and people make mistakes. I'm sure Perrodo didn't plan it, we were just in the wrong place, wrong time." Owen believed that Rast was overly aggressive on the first lap: "That's how you cause accidents, honestly. I couldn't even react fast enough before I hit the blue car on my left and was just in the gravel. Of course, it took five or six minutes to get the car unstuck. That was quite a setback." Rast thought that the cars behind him jumped the start, and he followed the race director's instructions: "Everybody who knows me knows that I'm a fair and hard driver, but I'm not taking somebody out on purpose. So yeah, it was the drivers behind me just jumping the start and I got the penalty for it."

The result kept Lapierre, Negrão and Vaxivière atop the Hypercar Drivers' Championship with 81 points; race winners Buemi, Hartley and Hirakawa moved from third to second, three points behind. With 69 points, Dumas and Pla fell from second to third. Bruni's and Lietz's LMGTE Pro win placed them atop the GTE Drivers' Championship with 84 points, ahead of teammates Christensen and Estre by three points. Toyota and Porsche left Le Mans as the Hypercar and GTE Manufacturers' Championship leaders, respectively, with three rounds of the season left.

== Official results ==
The minimum number of laps for classification at the finish (70 per cent of the overall race winner's distance) was 266 laps. Class winners are denoted in bold and with ‡.

Final race classification
Pos	Class	No.	Team	Drivers	Chassis	Tyre	Laps	Time/Reason
Pos	Class	No.	Team	Drivers	Engine	Tyre	Laps	Time/Reason
1	**Hypercar**	**8**	**(Japan) Toyota Gazoo Racing**	**(Switzerland) Sébastien Buemi (New Zealand) Brendon Hartley (Japan) Ryō Hirakawa**	**Toyota GR010 Hybrid**	M	**380**	**24:02:07.996‡**
1	**Hypercar**	**8**	**(Japan) Toyota Gazoo Racing**	**(Switzerland) Sébastien Buemi (New Zealand) Brendon Hartley (Japan) Ryō Hirakawa**	**Toyota H8909 3.5 L Turbo V6**	M	**380**	**24:02:07.996‡**
2	Hypercar	7	(Japan) Toyota Gazoo Racing	(United Kingdom) Mike Conway (Japan) Kamui Kobayashi (Argentina) José María López	Toyota GR010 Hybrid	M	380	+2:01.222
2	Hypercar	7	(Japan) Toyota Gazoo Racing	(United Kingdom) Mike Conway (Japan) Kamui Kobayashi (Argentina) José María López	Toyota H8909 3.5 L Turbo V6	M	380	+2:01.222
3	Hypercar	709	(United States) Glickenhaus Racing	(Australia) Ryan Briscoe (United Kingdom) Richard Westbrook (France) Franck Mailleux	Glickenhaus SCG 007 LMH	M	375	+5 Laps
3	Hypercar	709	(United States) Glickenhaus Racing	(Australia) Ryan Briscoe (United Kingdom) Richard Westbrook (France) Franck Mailleux	Glickenhaus P21 3.5 L Turbo V8	M	375	+5 Laps
4	Hypercar	708	(United States) Glickenhaus Racing	(France) Olivier Pla (France) Romain Dumas (Brazil) Pipo Derani	Glickenhaus SCG 007 LMH	M	370	+10 Laps
4	Hypercar	708	(United States) Glickenhaus Racing	(France) Olivier Pla (France) Romain Dumas (Brazil) Pipo Derani	Glickenhaus P21 3.5 L Turbo V8	M	370	+10 Laps
5	**LMP2**	**38**	**(United Kingdom) Jota**	**(Mexico) Roberto González (Portugal) António Félix da Costa (United Kingdom) Will Stevens**	**Oreca 07**	G	**369**	**+11 Laps‡**
5	**LMP2**	**38**	**(United Kingdom) Jota**	**(Mexico) Roberto González (Portugal) António Félix da Costa (United Kingdom) Will Stevens**	**Gibson GK428 4.2 L V8**	G	**369**	**+11 Laps‡**
6	LMP2	9	(Italy) Prema Orlen Team	(Poland) Robert Kubica (Switzerland) Louis Delétraz (Italy) Lorenzo Colombo	Oreca 07	G	369	+11 Laps
6	LMP2	9	(Italy) Prema Orlen Team	(Poland) Robert Kubica (Switzerland) Louis Delétraz (Italy) Lorenzo Colombo	Gibson GK428 4.2 L V8	G	369	+11 Laps
7	LMP2	28	(United Kingdom) Jota	(Denmark) Oliver Rasmussen (United Kingdom) Ed Jones (South Africa) Jonathan Aberdein	Oreca 07	G	368	+12 Laps
7	LMP2	28	(United Kingdom) Jota	(Denmark) Oliver Rasmussen (United Kingdom) Ed Jones (South Africa) Jonathan Aberdein	Gibson GK428 4.2 L V8	G	368	+12 Laps
8	LMP2	13	(France) TDS Racing x Vaillante	(Netherlands) Nyck de Vries (Note: De Vries was drafted in as a late replacement for Philippe Cimadomo, who was prohibited from competing after causing multiple incidents in free practice. The change meant the entry was no longer part of the LMP2 Pro-Am subclass.) (Switzerland) Mathias Beche (Netherlands) Tijmen van der Helm	Oreca 07	G	368	+12 Laps
8	LMP2	13	(France) TDS Racing x Vaillante	(Netherlands) Nyck de Vries (Switzerland) Mathias Beche (Netherlands) Tijmen van der Helm	Gibson GK428 4.2 L V8	G	368	+12 Laps
9	LMP2	5	(United States) Team Penske	(United States) Dane Cameron (France) Emmanuel Collard (Brazil) Felipe Nasr	Oreca 07	G	368	+12 Laps
9	LMP2	5	(United States) Team Penske	(United States) Dane Cameron (France) Emmanuel Collard (Brazil) Felipe Nasr	Gibson GK428 4.2 L V8	G	368	+12 Laps
10	LMP2	23	(United States) United Autosports USA	(United Kingdom) Alex Lynn (United Kingdom) Oliver Jarvis (United States) Josh Pierson	Oreca 07	G	368	+12 Laps
10	LMP2	23	(United States) United Autosports USA	(United Kingdom) Alex Lynn (United Kingdom) Oliver Jarvis (United States) Josh Pierson	Gibson GK428 4.2 L V8	G	368	+12 Laps
11	LMP2	37	(Switzerland) Cool Racing	(China) Yifei Ye (United States) Ricky Taylor (Germany) Niklas Krütten	Oreca 07	G	367	+13 Laps
11	LMP2	37	(Switzerland) Cool Racing	(China) Yifei Ye (United States) Ricky Taylor (Germany) Niklas Krütten	Gibson GK428 4.2 L V8	G	367	+13 Laps
12	LMP2	48	(France) IDEC Sport	(France) Paul Lafargue (France) Paul-Loup Chatin (France) Patrick Pilet	Oreca 07	G	366	+14 Laps
12	LMP2	48	(France) IDEC Sport	(France) Paul Lafargue (France) Paul-Loup Chatin (France) Patrick Pilet	Gibson GK428 4.2 L V8	G	366	+14 Laps
13	LMP2	1	(France) Richard Mille Racing Team	(France) Lilou Wadoux (France) Sébastien Ogier (France) Charles Milesi	Oreca 07	G	366	+14 Laps
13	LMP2	1	(France) Richard Mille Racing Team	(France) Lilou Wadoux (France) Sébastien Ogier (France) Charles Milesi	Gibson GK428 4.2 L V8	G	366	+14 Laps
14	LMP2	22	(United States) United Autosports USA	(United Kingdom) Phil Hanson (Portugal) Filipe Albuquerque (United States) Will Owen	Oreca 07	G	366	+14 Laps
14	LMP2	22	(United States) United Autosports USA	(United Kingdom) Phil Hanson (Portugal) Filipe Albuquerque (United States) Will Owen	Gibson GK428 4.2 L V8	G	366	+14 Laps
15	LMP2	32	(Belgium) Team WRT	(Switzerland) Rolf Ineichen (Italy) Mirko Bortolotti (Belgium) Dries Vanthoor	Oreca 07	G	366	+14 Laps
15	LMP2	32	(Belgium) Team WRT	(Switzerland) Rolf Ineichen (Italy) Mirko Bortolotti (Belgium) Dries Vanthoor	Gibson GK428 4.2 L V8	G	366	+14 Laps
16	LMP2	65	(France) Panis Racing	(France) Julien Canal (France) Nico Jamin (Netherlands) Job van Uitert	Oreca 07	G	366	+14 Laps
16	LMP2	65	(France) Panis Racing	(France) Julien Canal (France) Nico Jamin (Netherlands) Job van Uitert	Gibson GK428 4.2 L V8	G	366	+14 Laps
17	LMP2	34	(Poland) Inter Europol Competition	(Poland) Jakub Śmiechowski (United Kingdom) Alex Brundle (Mexico) Esteban Gutiérrez	Oreca 07	G	365	+15 Laps
17	LMP2	34	(Poland) Inter Europol Competition	(Poland) Jakub Śmiechowski (United Kingdom) Alex Brundle (Mexico) Esteban Gutiérrez	Gibson GK428 4.2 L V8	G	365	+15 Laps
18	LMP2	43	(Poland) Inter Europol Competition	(Denmark) David Heinemeier Hansson (Switzerland) Fabio Scherer (Brazil) Pietro Fittipaldi	Oreca 07	G	364	+16 Laps
18	LMP2	43	(Poland) Inter Europol Competition	(Denmark) David Heinemeier Hansson (Switzerland) Fabio Scherer (Brazil) Pietro Fittipaldi	Gibson GK428 4.2 L V8	G	364	+16 Laps
19	LMP2 **(Pro-Am)**	45	(Portugal) Algarve Pro Racing	(United States) Steven Thomas (Australia) James Allen (Austria) René Binder	Oreca 07	G	363	+17 Laps‡
19	LMP2 **(Pro-Am)**	45	(Portugal) Algarve Pro Racing	(United States) Steven Thomas (Australia) James Allen (Austria) René Binder	Gibson GK428 4.2 L V8	G	363	+17 Laps‡
20	LMP2 (Pro-Am)	24	(United Kingdom) Nielsen Racing	(United States) Rodrigo Sales (United Kingdom) Matt Bell (United Kingdom) Ben Hanley	Oreca 07	G	362	+18 Laps
20	LMP2 (Pro-Am)	24	(United Kingdom) Nielsen Racing	(United States) Rodrigo Sales (United Kingdom) Matt Bell (United Kingdom) Ben Hanley	Gibson GK428 4.2 L V8	G	362	+18 Laps
21	LMP2	41	(Switzerland) RealTeam by WRT	(Portugal) Rui Andrade (Austria) Ferdinand Habsburg (France) Norman Nato	Oreca 07	G	362	+18 Laps
21	LMP2	41	(Switzerland) RealTeam by WRT	(Portugal) Rui Andrade (Austria) Ferdinand Habsburg (France) Norman Nato	Gibson GK428 4.2 L V8	G	362	+18 Laps
22	LMP2 (Pro-Am)	3	(Luxembourg) DKR Engineering	(Germany) Laurents Hörr (Belgium) Jean Glorieux (France) Alexandre Cougnaud	Oreca 07	G	362	+18 Laps
22	LMP2 (Pro-Am)	3	(Luxembourg) DKR Engineering	(Germany) Laurents Hörr (Belgium) Jean Glorieux (France) Alexandre Cougnaud	Gibson GK428 4.2 L V8	G	362	+18 Laps
23	Hypercar	36	(France) Alpine Elf Team	(Brazil) André Negrão (France) Nicolas Lapierre (France) Matthieu Vaxivière	Alpine A480	M	362	+18 Laps
23	Hypercar	36	(France) Alpine Elf Team	(Brazil) André Negrão (France) Nicolas Lapierre (France) Matthieu Vaxivière	Gibson GL458 4.5 L V8	M	362	+18 Laps
24	LMP2 (Pro-Am)	83	(Italy) AF Corse	(France) François Perrodo (Denmark) Nicklas Nielsen (Italy) Alessio Rovera	Oreca 07	G	361	+19 Laps
24	LMP2 (Pro-Am)	83	(Italy) AF Corse	(France) François Perrodo (Denmark) Nicklas Nielsen (Italy) Alessio Rovera	Gibson GK428 4.2 L V8	G	361	+19 Laps
25	LMP2 (Pro-Am)	47	(Portugal) Algarve Pro Racing	(Germany) Sophia Flörsch (United States) John Falb (United Kingdom) Jack Aitken	Oreca 07	G	361	+19 Laps
25	LMP2 (Pro-Am)	47	(Portugal) Algarve Pro Racing	(Germany) Sophia Flörsch (United States) John Falb (United Kingdom) Jack Aitken	Gibson GK428 4.2 L V8	G	361	+19 Laps
26	LMP2 (Pro-Am)	44	(Slovakia) ARC Bratislava	(Slovakia) Miroslav Konôpka (Netherlands) Bent Viscaal (France) Tristan Vautier	Oreca 07	G	360	+20 Laps
26	LMP2 (Pro-Am)	44	(Slovakia) ARC Bratislava	(Slovakia) Miroslav Konôpka (Netherlands) Bent Viscaal (France) Tristan Vautier	Gibson GK428 4.2 L V8	G	360	+20 Laps
27	LMP2	10	(United Kingdom) Vector Sport	(Switzerland) Nico Müller (Republic of Ireland) Ryan Cullen (France) Sébastien Bourdais	Oreca 07	G	357	+23 Laps
27	LMP2	10	(United Kingdom) Vector Sport	(Switzerland) Nico Müller (Republic of Ireland) Ryan Cullen (France) Sébastien Bourdais	Gibson GK428 4.2 L V8	G	357	+23 Laps
28	**GTE Pro**	**91**	**(Germany) Porsche GT Team**	**(Italy) Gianmaria Bruni (Austria) Richard Lietz (France) Frédéric Makowiecki**	**Porsche 911 RSR-19**	M	**350**	**+30 Laps‡**
28	**GTE Pro**	**91**	**(Germany) Porsche GT Team**	**(Italy) Gianmaria Bruni (Austria) Richard Lietz (France) Frédéric Makowiecki**	**Porsche 4.2 L Flat-6**	M	**350**	**+30 Laps‡**
29	GTE Pro	51	(Italy) AF Corse	(Italy) Alessandro Pier Guidi (United Kingdom) James Calado (Brazil) Daniel Serra	Ferrari 488 GTE Evo	M	350	+30 Laps
29	GTE Pro	51	(Italy) AF Corse	(Italy) Alessandro Pier Guidi (United Kingdom) James Calado (Brazil) Daniel Serra	Ferrari F154CB 3.9 L Turbo V8	M	350	+30 Laps
30	GTE Pro	52	(Italy) AF Corse	(Spain) Miguel Molina (Italy) Antonio Fuoco (Italy) Davide Rigon	Ferrari 488 GTE Evo	M	349	+31 Laps
30	GTE Pro	52	(Italy) AF Corse	(Spain) Miguel Molina (Italy) Antonio Fuoco (Italy) Davide Rigon	Ferrari F154CB 3.9 L Turbo V8	M	349	+31 Laps
31	GTE Pro	92	(Germany) Porsche GT Team	(Denmark) Michael Christensen (France) Kévin Estre (Belgium) Laurens Vanthoor	Porsche 911 RSR-19	M	348	+32 Laps
31	GTE Pro	92	(Germany) Porsche GT Team	(Denmark) Michael Christensen (France) Kévin Estre (Belgium) Laurens Vanthoor	Porsche 4.2 L Flat-6	M	348	+32 Laps
32	GTE Pro	74	(United States) Riley Motorsports	(Brazil) Felipe Fraga (United Kingdom) Sam Bird (New Zealand) Shane van Gisbergen	Ferrari 488 GTE Evo	M	347	+33 Laps
32	GTE Pro	74	(United States) Riley Motorsports	(Brazil) Felipe Fraga (United Kingdom) Sam Bird (New Zealand) Shane van Gisbergen	Ferrari F154CB 3.9 L Turbo V8	M	347	+33 Laps
33	LMP2 (Pro-Am)	39	(France) Graff Racing	(France) Eric Trouillet (Switzerland) Sébastien Page (Switzerland) David Droux	Oreca 07	G	344	+36 Laps
33	LMP2 (Pro-Am)	39	(France) Graff Racing	(France) Eric Trouillet (Switzerland) Sébastien Page (Switzerland) David Droux	Gibson GK428 4.2 L V8	G	344	+36 Laps
34	**GTE Am**	**33**	**(United Kingdom) TF Sport**	**(United States) Ben Keating (Portugal) Henrique Chaves (Denmark) Marco Sørensen**	**Aston Martin Vantage AMR**	M	**343**	**+37 Laps‡**
34	**GTE Am**	**33**	**(United Kingdom) TF Sport**	**(United States) Ben Keating (Portugal) Henrique Chaves (Denmark) Marco Sørensen**	**Aston Martin 4.0 L Turbo V8**	M	**343**	**+37 Laps‡**
35	GTE Am	79	(United States) WeatherTech Racing	(United States) Cooper MacNeil (France) Julien Andlauer (United States) Thomas Merrill	Porsche 911 RSR-19	M	343	+37 Laps
35	GTE Am	79	(United States) WeatherTech Racing	(United States) Cooper MacNeil (France) Julien Andlauer (United States) Thomas Merrill	Porsche 4.2 L Flat-6	M	343	+37 Laps
36	GTE Am	98	(Canada) NorthWest AMR	(Canada) Paul Dalla Lana (United Kingdom) David Pittard (Denmark) Nicki Thiim	Aston Martin Vantage AMR	M	342	+38 Laps
36	GTE Am	98	(Canada) NorthWest AMR	(Canada) Paul Dalla Lana (United Kingdom) David Pittard (Denmark) Nicki Thiim	Aston Martin 4.0 L Turbo V8	M	342	+38 Laps
37	GTE Am	86	(United Kingdom) GR Racing	(United Kingdom) Michael Wainwright (Italy) Riccardo Pera (United Kingdom) Ben Barker	Porsche 911 RSR-19	M	340	+40 Laps
37	GTE Am	86	(United Kingdom) GR Racing	(United Kingdom) Michael Wainwright (Italy) Riccardo Pera (United Kingdom) Ben Barker	Porsche 4.2 L Flat-6	M	340	+40 Laps
38	GTE Am	88	(Germany) Dempsey-Proton Racing	(United States) Fred Poordad (United States) Maxwell Root (Belgium) Jan Heylen	Porsche 911 RSR-19	M	340	+40 Laps
38	GTE Am	88	(Germany) Dempsey-Proton Racing	(United States) Fred Poordad (United States) Maxwell Root (Belgium) Jan Heylen	Porsche 4.2 L Flat-6	M	340	+40 Laps
39	GTE Am	54	(Italy) AF Corse	(Switzerland) Thomas Flohr (Italy) Francesco Castellacci (New Zealand) Nick Cassidy	Ferrari 488 GTE Evo	M	340	+40 Laps
39	GTE Am	54	(Italy) AF Corse	(Switzerland) Thomas Flohr (Italy) Francesco Castellacci (New Zealand) Nick Cassidy	Ferrari F154CB 3.9 L Turbo V8	M	340	+40 Laps
40	GTE Am	85	(Italy) Iron Dames	(Switzerland) Rahel Frey (Denmark) Michelle Gatting (Belgium) Sarah Bovy	Ferrari 488 GTE Evo	M	339	+41 Laps
40	GTE Am	85	(Italy) Iron Dames	(Switzerland) Rahel Frey (Denmark) Michelle Gatting (Belgium) Sarah Bovy	Ferrari F154CB 3.9 L Turbo V8	M	339	+41 Laps
41	GTE Am	21	(Italy) AF Corse	(United States) Simon Mann (Switzerland) Christoph Ulrich (Finland) Toni Vilander	Ferrari 488 GTE Evo	M	339	+41 Laps
41	GTE Am	21	(Italy) AF Corse	(United States) Simon Mann (Switzerland) Christoph Ulrich (Finland) Toni Vilander	Ferrari F154CB 3.9 L Turbo V8	M	339	+41 Laps
42	GTE Am	61	(Italy) AF Corse	(Monaco) Louis Prette (United States) Conrad Grunewald (France) Vincent Abril	Ferrari 488 GTE Evo	M	339	+41 Laps
42	GTE Am	61	(Italy) AF Corse	(Monaco) Louis Prette (United States) Conrad Grunewald (France) Vincent Abril	Ferrari F154CB 3.9 L Turbo V8	M	339	+41 Laps
43	GTE Am	55	(Switzerland) Spirit of Race	(United Kingdom) Duncan Cameron (Republic of Ireland) Matt Griffin (South Africa) David Perel	Ferrari 488 GTE Evo	M	339	+41 Laps
43	GTE Am	55	(Switzerland) Spirit of Race	(United Kingdom) Duncan Cameron (Republic of Ireland) Matt Griffin (South Africa) David Perel	Ferrari F154CB 3.9 L Turbo V8	M	339	+41 Laps
44	GTE Am	99	(United States) Hardpoint Motorsport	(Indonesia) Andrew Haryanto (Belgium) Alessio Picariello (Estonia) Martin Rump	Porsche 911 RSR-19	M	338	+42 Laps
44	GTE Am	99	(United States) Hardpoint Motorsport	(Indonesia) Andrew Haryanto (Belgium) Alessio Picariello (Estonia) Martin Rump	Porsche 4.2 L Flat-6	M	338	+42 Laps
45	GTE Am	57	(Switzerland) Kessel Racing	(Japan) Takeshi Kimura (Denmark) Frederik Schandorff (Denmark) Mikkel Jensen	Ferrari 488 GTE Evo	M	336	+44 Laps
45	GTE Am	57	(Switzerland) Kessel Racing	(Japan) Takeshi Kimura (Denmark) Frederik Schandorff (Denmark) Mikkel Jensen	Ferrari F154CB 3.9 L Turbo V8	M	336	+44 Laps
46	GTE Am	80	(Italy) Iron Lynx	(Italy) Matteo Cressoni (Italy) Giancarlo Fisichella (United States) Richard Heistand	Ferrari 488 GTE Evo	M	336	+44 Laps
46	GTE Am	80	(Italy) Iron Lynx	(Italy) Matteo Cressoni (Italy) Giancarlo Fisichella (United States) Richard Heistand	Ferrari F154CB 3.9 L Turbo V8	M	336	+44 Laps
47	GTE Am	77	(Germany) Dempsey-Proton Racing	(Germany) Christian Ried (United Kingdom) Sebastian Priaulx (United Kingdom) Harry Tincknell	Porsche 911 RSR-19	M	336	+44 Laps
47	GTE Am	77	(Germany) Dempsey-Proton Racing	(Germany) Christian Ried (United Kingdom) Sebastian Priaulx (United Kingdom) Harry Tincknell	Porsche 4.2 L Flat-6	M	336	+44 Laps
48	LMP2 (Pro-Am)	35	(France) Ultimate	(France) Jean-Baptiste Lahaye (France) Matthieu Lahaye (France) François Hériau	Oreca 07	G	335	+45 Laps
48	LMP2 (Pro-Am)	35	(France) Ultimate	(France) Jean-Baptiste Lahaye (France) Matthieu Lahaye (France) François Hériau	Gibson GK428 4.2 L V8	G	335	+45 Laps
49	LMP2 (Pro-Am)	27	(Spain) CD Sport	(France) Christophe Cresp (Denmark) Michael Jensen (France) Steven Palette	Ligier JS P217	G	333	+47 Laps
49	LMP2 (Pro-Am)	27	(Spain) CD Sport	(France) Christophe Cresp (Denmark) Michael Jensen (France) Steven Palette	Gibson GK428 4.2L V8	G	333	+47 Laps
50	GTE Am	66	(United Kingdom) JMW Motorsport	(Netherlands) Renger van der Zande (United States) Mark Kvamme (United States) Jason Hart	Ferrari 488 GTE Evo	M	331	+49 Laps
50	GTE Am	66	(United Kingdom) JMW Motorsport	(Netherlands) Renger van der Zande (United States) Mark Kvamme (United States) Jason Hart	Ferrari F154CB 3.9 L Turbo V8	M	331	+49 Laps
51	GTE Am	93	(Germany) Proton Competition	(Republic of Ireland) Michael Fassbender (Australia) Matt Campbell (Canada) Zacharie Robichon	Porsche 911 RSR-19	M	329	+51 Laps
51	GTE Am	93	(Germany) Proton Competition	(Republic of Ireland) Michael Fassbender (Australia) Matt Campbell (Canada) Zacharie Robichon	Porsche 4.2 L Flat-6	M	329	+51 Laps
52	LMP2	30	(France) Duqueine Team	(United Kingdom) Richard Bradley (Mexico) Memo Rojas (France) Reshad de Gerus	Oreca 07	G	326	+54 Laps
52	LMP2	30	(France) Duqueine Team	(United Kingdom) Richard Bradley (Mexico) Memo Rojas (France) Reshad de Gerus	Gibson GK428 4.2 L V8	G	326	+54 Laps
53	GTE Am	75	(Italy) Iron Lynx	(Germany) Pierre Ehret (Germany) Christian Hook (Argentina) Nicolás Varrone	Ferrari 488 GTE Evo	M	324	+56 Laps
53	GTE Am	75	(Italy) Iron Lynx	(Germany) Pierre Ehret (Germany) Christian Hook (Argentina) Nicolás Varrone	Ferrari F154CB 3.9 L Turbo V8	M	324	+56 Laps
NC	GTE Am	60	(Italy) Iron Lynx	(Italy) Claudio Schiavoni (Italy) Alessandro Balzan (Italy) Raffaele Giammaria	Ferrari 488 GTE Evo	M	289	Incomplete final lap (Accident)
NC	GTE Am	60	(Italy) Iron Lynx	(Italy) Claudio Schiavoni (Italy) Alessandro Balzan (Italy) Raffaele Giammaria	Ferrari F154CB 3.9 L Turbo V8	M	289	Incomplete final lap (Accident)
DNF	LMP2	31	(Belgium) WRT	(Indonesia) Sean Gelael (Netherlands) Robin Frijns (Germany) René Rast	Oreca 07	G	285	Accident
DNF	LMP2	31	(Belgium) WRT	(Indonesia) Sean Gelael (Netherlands) Robin Frijns (Germany) René Rast	Gibson GK428 4.2 L V8	G	285	Accident
DNF	GTE Pro	64	(United States) Corvette Racing	(United States) Tommy Milner (United Kingdom) Nick Tandy (United Kingdom) Alexander Sims	Chevrolet Corvette C8.R	M	260	Accident
DNF	GTE Pro	64	(United States) Corvette Racing	(United States) Tommy Milner (United Kingdom) Nick Tandy (United Kingdom) Alexander Sims	Chevrolet LT2 5.5 L V8	M	260	Accident
DNF	GTE Am	56	(Germany) Team Project 1	(United States) Brendan Iribe (United Kingdom) Ollie Millroy (United Kingdom) Ben Barnicoat	Porsche 911 RSR-19	M	241	Accident
DNF	GTE Am	56	(Germany) Team Project 1	(United States) Brendan Iribe (United Kingdom) Ollie Millroy (United Kingdom) Ben Barnicoat	Porsche 4.2 L Flat-6	M	241	Accident
DNF	GTE Pro	63	(United States) Corvette Racing	(Spain) Antonio García (United States) Jordan Taylor (Netherlands) Nicky Catsburg	Chevrolet Corvette C8.R	M	214	Suspension
DNF	GTE Pro	63	(United States) Corvette Racing	(Spain) Antonio García (United States) Jordan Taylor (Netherlands) Nicky Catsburg	Chevrolet LT2 5.5 L V8	M	214	Suspension
DNF	GTE Am	59	(United Kingdom) Inception Racing	(Sweden) Alexander West (France) Côme Ledogar (France) Marvin Klein	Ferrari 488 GTE Evo	M	190	Engine
DNF	GTE Am	59	(United Kingdom) Inception Racing	(Sweden) Alexander West (France) Côme Ledogar (France) Marvin Klein	Ferrari F154CB 3.9 L Turbo V8	M	190	Engine
DNF	GTE Am	71	(Switzerland) Spirit of Race	(France) Franck Dezoteux (France) Pierre Ragues (France) Gabriel Aubry	Ferrari 488 GTE Evo	M	127	Engine
DNF	GTE Am	71	(Switzerland) Spirit of Race	(France) Franck Dezoteux (France) Pierre Ragues (France) Gabriel Aubry	Ferrari F154CB 3.9 L Turbo V8	M	127	Engine
DNF	GTE Am	777	(Japan) D'station Racing	(Japan) Satoshi Hoshino (Japan) Tomonobu Fujii (United Kingdom) Charlie Fagg	Aston Martin Vantage AMR	M	112	Chassis damage
DNF	GTE Am	777	(Japan) D'station Racing	(Japan) Satoshi Hoshino (Japan) Tomonobu Fujii (United Kingdom) Charlie Fagg	Aston Martin 4.0 L Turbo V8	M	112	Chassis damage
DNF	GTE Am	46	(Germany) Team Project 1	(Italy) Matteo Cairoli (Denmark) Mikkel O. Pedersen (Switzerland) Nicolas Leutwiler	Porsche 911 RSR-19	M	77	Puncture damage
DNF	GTE Am	46	(Germany) Team Project 1	(Italy) Matteo Cairoli (Denmark) Mikkel O. Pedersen (Switzerland) Nicolas Leutwiler	Porsche 4.2 L Flat-6	M	77	Puncture damage

Tyre manufacturers
Key
Symbol	Tyre manufacturer
**G**	Goodyear
**M**	Michelin

== Championship standings after the race ==
2022 Hypercar World Endurance Drivers' Championship
Pos.	+/–	Driver	Points
1		(France) Nicolas Lapierre (Brazil) André Negrão (France) Matthieu Vaxivière	81
2	1	(Switzerland) Sébastien Buemi (New Zealand) Brendon Hartley (Japan) Ryō Hirakawa	78
3	1	(France) Romain Dumas (France) Olivier Pla	69
4		(United Kingdom) Mike Conway (Japan) Kamui Kobayashi (Argentina) José María López	61
5	1	(Brazil) Pipo Derani	46

2022 Hypercar World Endurance Championship
Pos.	+/–	Driver	Points
1	1	(Japan) Toyota	103
2	1	(France) Alpine	81
3		(United States) Glickenhaus	69

2022 World Endurance GTE Drivers' Championship
Pos.	+/–	Driver	Points
1	3	(Italy) Gianmaria Bruni (Austria) Richard Lietz	84
2	1	(Denmark) Michael Christensen (France) Kévin Estre	81
3	1	(United Kingdom) James Calado (Italy) Alessandro Pier Guidi	79
4	1	(Italy) Antonio Fuoco (Spain) Miguel Molina	57
5	19	(France) Frédéric Makowiecki	50

2022 World Endurance GTE Manufacturers' Championship
Pos.	+/–	Driver	Points
1		(Germany) Porsche	165
2		(Italy) Ferrari	139
3		(United States) Chevrolet	40
