= Jonathan Aberdein =

South African racing driver

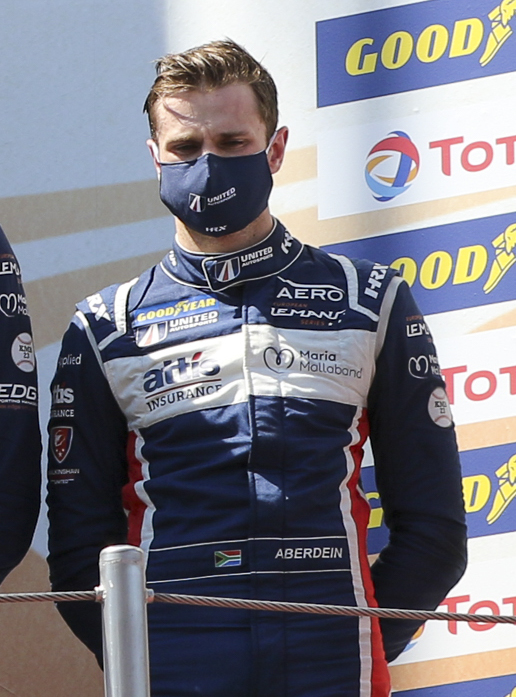
- Aberdein in 2021
- Nationality: South African
- Born: Jonathan David Aberdein; 14 February 1998 (age 28) Cape Town, South Africa
- Relatives: Chris Aberdein (father)

European Le Mans Series
- Categorisation: FIA Gold
- Years active: 2021, 2023
- Teams: United Autosports, Inter Europol Competition
- Starts: 12
- Championships: 0
- Wins: 1
- Podiums: 5
- Poles: 0
- Fastest laps: 0
- Best finish: 2nd in 2021

Previous series
- 2022 2022 2019-20 2018 2016-17 2016-17: ADAC GT Masters; World Endurance Championship; Deutsche Tourenwagen Masters; FIA European F3; Formula 4 UAE Championship; ADAC Formula 4

Championship titles
- 2016-17: Formula 4 UAE Championship

Jonathan David Aberdein (born 14 February 1998) is a South African racing driver who last competed in the 2023 European Le Mans Series for Inter Europol Competition.

Beginning his single-seater career in 2016, Aberdein was the inaugural champion of the Formula 4 UAE Championship in early 2017. He also competed in the ADAC Formula 4 Championship in 2016 and 2017, and the FIA Formula 3 European Championship in 2018.

Aberdein then moved to sportscar racing, competing in Deutsche Tourenwagen Masters in 2019 and 2020 before switching to endurance prototypes. He finished second overall in the 2021 European Le Mans Series LMP2 class with United Autosports before moving to the FIA World Endurance Championship for 2022, finishing third in the LMP2 class at the 24 Hours of Le Mans. A second European Le Mans Series season in 2023 was his most recent racing endeavor.

== Career ==
=== 2016–2018: Junior single-seaters ===
Aberdein's first single-seater championship was the 2016 ADAC Formula 4 Championship, driving for Motopark. The following year, he won the 2016–17 Formula 4 UAE Championship title with 14 wins out of 18 races. However, he only finished ninth overall in the 2017 ADAC Formula 4 Championship, although he took four podiums during the season.

Aberdein graduated to European Formula 3 for 2018, remaining with Motopark for a third year following an extensive testing programme with the team. He took three podiums across the season, two at Silverstone and one at the Red Bull Ring, and finished 12th in the standings.

=== 2019–2020: Deutsche Tourenwagen Masters ===
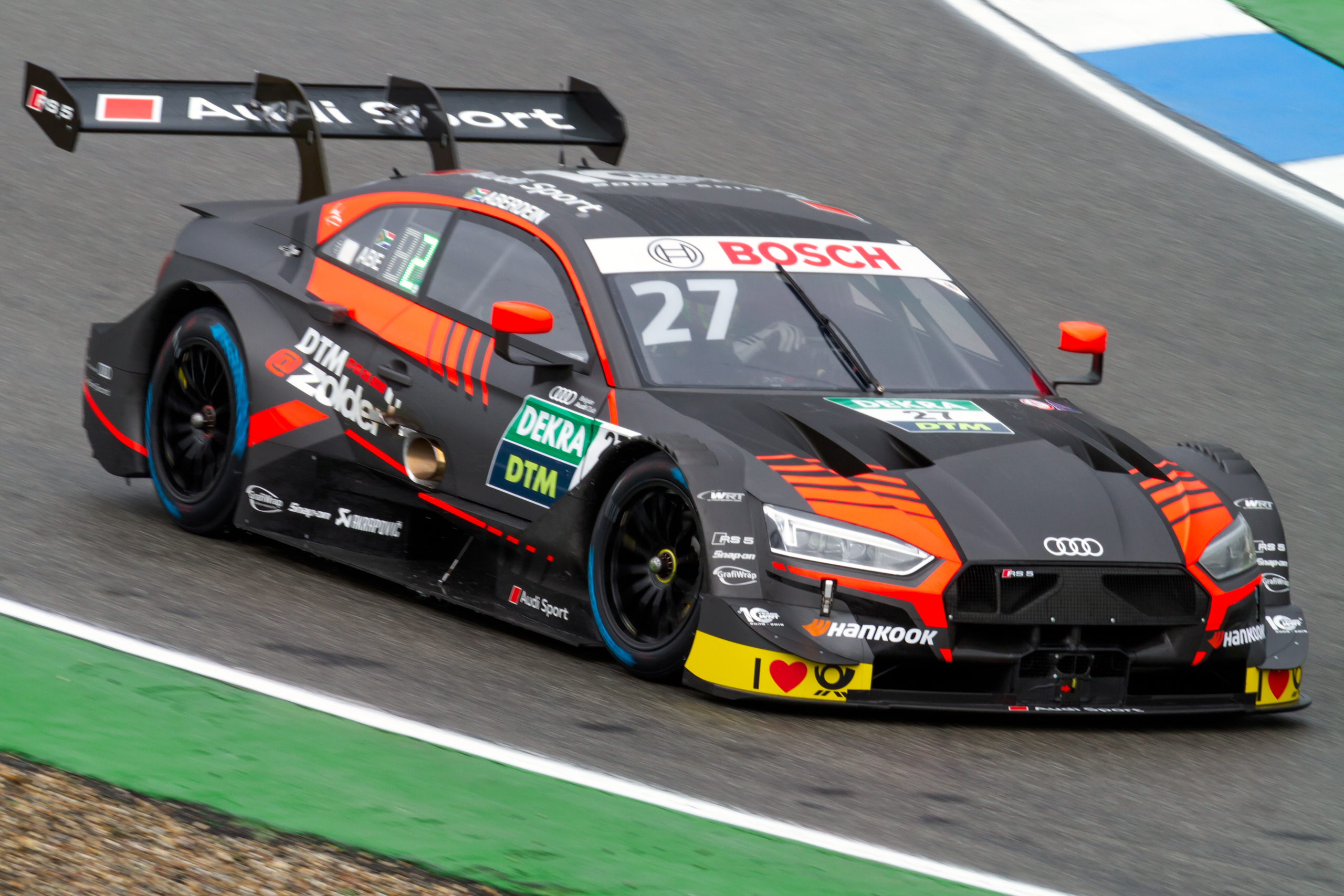
Aberdein switched to touring cars for the 2019 Deutsche Tourenwagen Masters.

Aberdein's first experience in DTM was in 2017, when he took part in a rookie test for Audi at the Lausitzring. He took part in another test in December 2018, this time for Audi's customer teams at Jerez.

Aberdein was announced to be competing in the 2019 season with Audi Sport Team WRT the following March. He finished the season in tenth overall, with 67 points and a best race result of fourth at Assen and the Nürburgring.

For the 2020 season, Aberdein was originally set to serve as Audi's reserve driver in DTM and Formula E, a deal which likely would have included just one race appearance in place of Robin Frijns at the Norisring. Instead, he moved to BMW Team RMR for a sophomore DTM campaign. He was unable to improve on his results from the previous year, again taking a best race result of fourth at Zolder, and finished 11th in the standings.

=== 2021–2023: LMP2 endurance racing ===
In 2021, Aberdein moved to the LMP2 class of the European Le Mans Series, competing alongside Tom Gamble and Philip Hanson at United Autosports. With four podiums, including a win at the season-ending race in Portugal, the trio ended up finishing second in the standings. In addition, he joined the team for the 24 Hours of Le Mans together with Nico Jamin and Manuel Maldonado, though the race would conclude in a retirement due to a crash with the sister United car caused by Maldonado.

2022 saw Aberdein team up with Ed Jones and Oliver Rasmussen to drive for Jota Sport in the World Endurance Championship. Following a fifth place at Sebring, the team would be forced to retire at Spa-Francorchamps. The team bounced back strongly at the 24 Hours of Le Mans, finishing third in class and joining the sister car, which took victory, on the podium. Aberdein, Jones, and Rasmussen took another third place at the penultimate race in Fuji, eventually ending up sixth in the teams' standings.

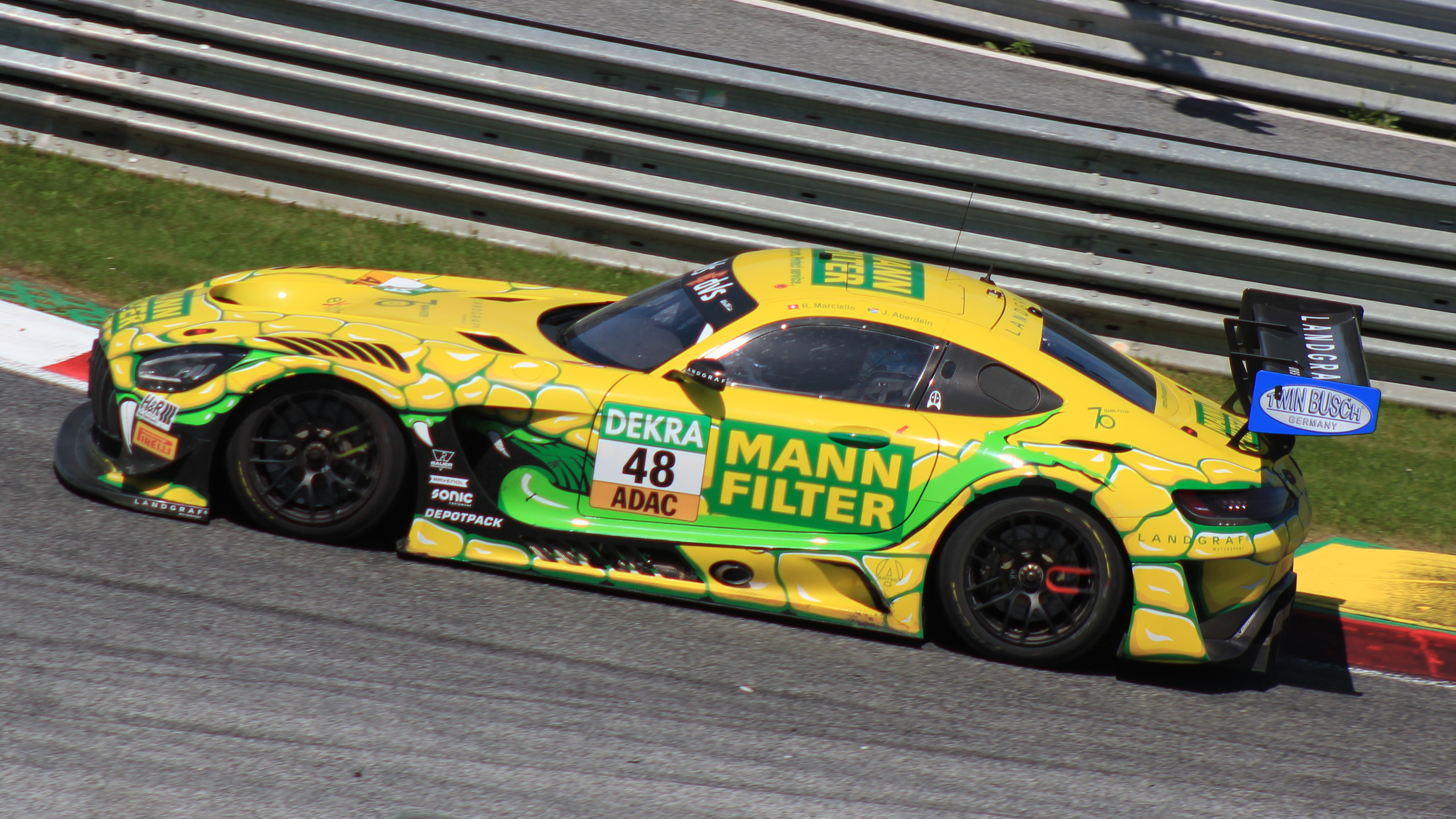
Aberdein racing in the 2022 ADAC GT Masters.

Aberdein made a brief return to GT racing in 2022 alongside his endurance campaign, competing in the first two rounds of the ADAC GT Masters for Mercedes-AMG–affiliated Mann-Filter Team Landgraf. With three podiums in the first three races, he finished 20th in the overall standings. He also competed in the opening round of the 2022 Nürburgring Langstrecken-Serie with Team Sorg Rennsport, finishing eighth in the VT2 FWD class.

For 2023, Aberdein returned to the European Le Mans Series. Competing in the LMP2 class for Inter Europol Competition, Aberdein drove alongside Olli Caldwell and Rui Andrade in the team's No. 43 entry. With one podium at Paul Ricard but three retirements out of the six races, the team finished seventh in the standings.

== Personal life ==
Aberdein is the son of Chris Aberdein, who was an Audi works driver in South Africa in the 1990s.

== Racing record ==
=== Karting career summary ===
Season	Series	Team	Position
2013	ROK Cup International Final — Super ROK		14th
2014	ROK Cup International Final — Super ROK		13th
2015	Rotax Max Challenge Euro Trophy — Senior		13th
2015	ROK Cup International Final — Senior	RKT	6th
2015	Rotax Max Challenge Grand Finals — Senior		59th
2016	WSK Champions Cup — OK	RKT	20th

=== Racing career summary ===
Season	Series	Team	Races	Wins	Poles	F/Laps	Podiums	Points	Position
2016	ADAC Formula 4 Championship	Motopark	24	0	0	0	1	49	14th
2016	Formula 4 UAE Championship - Trophy Event	Team Motopark	3	3	2	1	3	N/A	NC
2016–17	Formula 4 UAE Championship	Team Motopark	18	14	12	11	16	368	**1st**
2017	ADAC Formula 4 Championship	Motopark	21	0	0	1	4	94	9th
2018	FIA Formula 3 European Championship	Motopark	30	0	0	1	3	108	12th
2019	Deutsche Tourenwagen Masters	Audi Sport Team WRT	18	0	0	0	0	67	10th
2020	Deutsche Tourenwagen Masters	BMW Team RMR	18	0	0	0	0	62	11th
2021	European Le Mans Series - LMP2	United Autosports	6	1	0	0	4	86	**2nd**
2021	24 Hours of Le Mans - LMP2	United Autosports	1	0	0	0	0	N/A	DNF
2022	FIA World Endurance Championship - LMP2	Jota Sport	6	0	0	1	2	70	8th
2022	24 Hours of Le Mans - LMP2	Jota Sport	1	0	0	0	0	N/A	**3rd**
2022	Nürburgring Langstrecken-Serie - VT2 FWD	Team Sorg Rennsport	1	0	0	0	0	0	NC
2022	ADAC GT Masters	MANN-FILTER Team Landgraf	4	0	1	0	3	56	20th
2023	European Le Mans Series - LMP2	Inter Europol Competition	6	0	0	0	1	33	7th

=== Complete ADAC Formula 4 Championship results ===
(key) (Races in bold indicate pole position) (Races in italics indicate fastest lap)

Year	Team	1	2	3	4	5	6	7	8	9	10	11	12	13	14	15	16	17	18	19	20	21	22	23	24	Pos	Points
2016	Motopark	OSC1; 1; 15	OSC1; 2; 24	OSC1; 3; 11	SAC; 1; 10	SAC; 2 Ret	SAC; 3; 8	LAU; 1 Ret	LAU; 2; 13	LAU; 3; 13	OSC2; 1; 8	OSC2; 2; 13	OSC2; 3; 4	RBR; 1; 26	RBR; 2; 9	RBR; 3; 21	NÜR; 1; 14	NÜR; 2; 9	NÜR; 3; 15	ZAN; 1; 7	ZAN; 2; 10	ZAN; 3; 2	HOC; 1; 23	HOC; 2; 6	HOC; 3; 27	14th	49
2017	Motopark	OSC1; 1; 3	OSC1; 2; 8	OSC1; 3; 3	LAU; 1 Ret	LAU; 2; 13	LAU; 3 Ret	RBR; 1; 14	RBR; 2; 4	RBR; 3; 12	OSC2; 1; 2	OSC2; 2; 7	OSC2; 3; 9	NÜR; 1 Ret	NÜR; 2; 9	NÜR; 3; 16	SAC; 1; 13	SAC; 2; 9	SAC; 3; 16	HOC; 1 Ret	HOC; 2; 2	HOC; 3; 17				9th	94

=== Complete Formula 4 UAE Championship results ===
(key) (Races in bold indicate pole position; races in italics indicate fastest lap)

Year	Team	1	2	3	4	5	6	7	8	9	10	11	12	13	14	15	16	17	18	DC	Points
2016–17	Team Motopark	**DUB1**; **1**; 1	DUB1; 2; 1	**DUB1**; **3**; 1	**YMC1**; **1**; 1	YMC1; 2; 1	**YMC1**; **3**; 1	YMC1; 4; 1	**DUB2**; **1**; 1	DUB2; 2; 3	**DUB2**; **3**; 1	**YMC2**; **1**; 1	YMC2; 2; 7	**YMC2**; **3**; 1	YMC2; 4; 2	**YMC3**; **1**; 1	YMC3; 2; 1	**YMC3**; **3**; 1	YMC3; 4; 5	1st	368

=== Complete FIA Formula 3 European Championship results ===
(key) (Races in bold indicate pole position) (Races in italics indicate fastest lap)

Year	Entrant	Engine	1	2	3	4	5	6	7	8	9	10	11	12	13	14	15	16	17	18	19	20	21	22	23	24	25	26	27	28	29	30	DC	Points
2018	Motopark	Volkswagen	PAU; 1; 12	PAU; 2; 19	PAU; 3; 8‡	HUN; 1; 17	HUN; 2; 14	HUN; 3; 8	NOR; 1; 16	NOR; 2; 14	NOR; 3 Ret	ZAN; 1; 7	ZAN; 2; 11	ZAN; 3; 8	SPA; 1 Ret	SPA; 2; 9	SPA; 3; 7	SIL; 1; 5	SIL; 2; 3	SIL; 3; 3	MIS; 1; 10	MIS; 2; 14	MIS; 3; 11	NÜR; 1; 9	NÜR; 2; 7	NÜR; 3; 12	RBR; 1; 7	RBR; 2; 6	RBR; 3; 3	HOC; 1; 16	HOC; 2; 11	HOC; 3; 7	12th	109

^{‡} Half points awarded as less than 75% of race distance was completed.

=== Complete Deutsche Tourenwagen Masters results ===
Year	Entrant	Chassis	1	2	3	4	5	6	7	8	9	10	11	12	13	14	15	16	17	18	Rank	Points
2019	Audi Sport Team WRT	Audi RS5 Turbo DTM	HOC; 1; 15	HOC; 2; 12	ZOL; 1 Ret	ZOL; 2; 12	MIS; 1; 8	MIS; 2; 7	NOR; 1; 13	NOR; 2; 14	ASS; 1; 6	ASS; 2; 4	BRH; 1; 9	BRH; 2; 13	LAU; 1; 14	LAU; 2; 7	NÜR; 1; 4	NÜR; 2; 5	HOC; 1; 14	HOC; 2 Ret	10th	67
2020	BMW Team RMR	BMW M4 Turbo DTM	SPA; 1; 10	SPA; 2; 9	LAU; 1; 15	LAU; 2; 9	LAU; 1; 14	LAU; 2; 7	ASS; 1; 6	ASS; 2; 13	NÜR; 1; 10	NÜR; 2; 8	NÜR; 1; 6	NÜR; 2; 10	ZOL; 1; 11	ZOL; 2; 11	ZOL; 1; 4	ZOL; 2 Ret	HOC; 1; 5	HOC; 2; 7	11th	62

=== Complete European Le Mans Series results ===
(key) (Races in bold indicate pole position; results in italics indicate fastest lap)

Year	Entrant	Class	Chassis	Engine	1	2	3	4	5	6	Rank	Points
2021	United Autosports	LMP2	Oreca 07	Gibson GK428 4.2 L V8	CAT; 3	RBR; 7	LEC; 2	MNZ; 2	SPA; 8	ALG; 1	2nd	86
2023	Inter Europol Competition	LMP2	Oreca 07	Gibson GK428 4.2 L V8	CAT; Ret	LEC; 3	ARA; Ret	SPA; Ret	ALG; 6	POR; 4	7th	33

=== Complete 24 Hours of Le Mans results ===
Year	Team	Co-Drivers	Car	Class	Laps	Pos.	Class Pos.
2021	(United Kingdom) United Autosports	(France) Nico Jamin (Venezuela) Manuel Maldonado	Oreca 07-Gibson	LMP2	75	DNF	DNF
2022	(United Kingdom) Jota Sport	(United Arab Emirates) Ed Jones (Denmark) Oliver Rasmussen	Oreca 07-Gibson	LMP2	368	7th	**3rd**

=== Complete FIA World Endurance Championship results ===
(key) (Races in bold indicate pole position; races in italics indicate fastest lap)

Year	Entrant	Class	Car	Engine	1	2	3	4	5	6	Rank	Points
2021	United Autosports	LMP2	Oreca 07	Gibson GK428 4.2 L V8	SPA	ALG	MNZ	LMS; Ret	BHR	BHR	NC	0
2022	Jota Sport	LMP2	Oreca 07	Gibson GK428 4.2 L V8	SEB; 5	SPA; Ret	LMS; 3	MNZ; 10	FUJ; 3	BHR; 7	8th	70

=== Complete ADAC GT Masters results ===
(key) (Races in bold indicate pole position) (Races in italics indicate fastest lap)

Year	Team	Car	1	2	3	4	5	6	7	8	9	10	11	12	13	14	DC	Points
2022	Mann-Filter Team Landgraf	Mercedes-AMG GT3 Evo	OSC; 1; 3	OSC; 2; 3^{3}	**RBR**; **1**; 3^{1}	RBR; 2; 14	ZAN; 1	ZAN; 2	NÜR; 1	NÜR; 2	LAU; 1	LAU; 2	SAC; 1	SAC; 2	HOC; 1	HOC; 2	20th	56

Sporting positions
Preceded by Inaugural	Formula 4 UAE Championship; Champion; 2016–17	Succeeded by Charles Weerts
