= Chris Aberdein =

South African racing driver (born 1963)

- Nationality: South African
- Born: Christopher David Aberdein; 23 January 1963 (age 63)
- Relatives: Jonathan Aberdein (son)

Christopher David Aberdein (born 23 January 1963) is a South African racing driver who competed in the South African Touring Car Championship for Audi in the late 1990s, finishing runner-up in 1996 to teammate Terry Moss, and picking up 7 wins and 12 podiums on the way. Over the course of his career in the sport, Aberdein won almost 10% of races that he entered.

Aberdein's son Jonathan is also a racing driver, who currently competes in the DTM.
