= 2016–17 Formula 4 UAE Championship =

Motor racing season

Seasons
- ← none 2017–18 →

The 2016–17 Formula 4 UAE Championship was the inaugural season of the Formula 4 UAE Championship, a motor racing series for the United Arab Emirates regulated according to FIA Formula 4 regulations, and organised and promoted by the Automobile & Touring Club of the UAE (ATCUAE) and AUH Motorsports.

It began on 28 October 2016 at the Yas Marina Circuit and finished on 11 March 2017 at the same venue, after a 3-race non-championship opening round and 18 championship races held across five rounds, all of them held at the Yas Marina Circuit in Abu Dhabi and the Dubai Autodrome.

== Teams and drivers ==
Team	No.	Driver	Rounds
(United Arab Emirates) ATCUAE	3	(United Arab Emirates) Saif ben Sulayem	TR, 1–2, 5
(United Arab Emirates) Energy Dubai F4 Racing Team	4	(United Kingdom) Sean Babington	All
(United Arab Emirates) Energy Dubai F4 Racing Team	8	(Sweden) Lucas Petersson	5
(United Arab Emirates) Energy Dubai F4 Racing Team	9	(India) Ricky Donison	TR
(Germany) Team Motopark 2	7	(Venezuela) Sebastián Fernández	3–4
(Germany) Team Motopark 2	25	(Belgium) Charles Weerts	3–5
(Germany) Team Motopark 2	27	(Netherlands) Leonard Hoogenboom	5
(United Arab Emirates) Abu Dhabi Racing	8	(United Arab Emirates) Amna Al Qubaisi	1
(United Arab Emirates) Rasgaira Motorsports	11	(Republic of Ireland) James Roe	1–2
(United Arab Emirates) Rasgaira Motorsports	13	(Switzerland) Fabio Scherer	4–5
(United Arab Emirates) Rasgaira Motorsports	79	(United States) David Malukas	2–4
Qatar Motor and Motorcycle Federation	20	(Qatar) Abdulrahman Tolefat	TR, All
Qatar Motor and Motorcycle Federation	22	(Qatar) Ahmad Al Muhannadi	TR, All
(Germany) Team Motopark	21	(South Africa) Jonathan Aberdein	TR, All
(Germany) Team Motopark	23	(United States) Logan Sargeant	TR, All
(United Arab Emirates) Dragon F4	88	(Australia) Oscar Piastri	2–4
(United Arab Emirates) Dragon F4	88	(China) Sun Yueyang	5

== Race calendar and results ==
The season featured 18 championship races over five rounds. Additionally, a three-race non-championship round, called "Trophy Event", took place at Yas Marina Circuit at the start of the season. All rounds were held in the United Arab Emirates.

Round		Circuit	Date	Pole position	Fastest lap	Winning driver	Winning team	Supporting
2016
TE	R1	Yas Marina Circuit, Abu Dhabi (Grand Prix layout)	28 October	(South Africa) Jonathan Aberdein	(United States) Logan Sargeant	(South Africa) Jonathan Aberdein	(Germany) Team Motopark	Toyota 86 Cup; Radical Middle East Cup; Formula Gulf Academy
TE	R2	Yas Marina Circuit, Abu Dhabi (Grand Prix layout)	29 October		(South Africa) Jonathan Aberdein	(South Africa) Jonathan Aberdein	(Germany) Team Motopark	Toyota 86 Cup; Radical Middle East Cup; Formula Gulf Academy
TE	R3	Yas Marina Circuit, Abu Dhabi (Grand Prix layout)	29 October	(South Africa) Jonathan Aberdein	(United States) Logan Sargeant	(South Africa) Jonathan Aberdein	(Germany) Team Motopark	Toyota 86 Cup; Radical Middle East Cup; Formula Gulf Academy
1	R1	Dubai Autodrome, Dubai (National layout)	18 November	(South Africa) Jonathan Aberdein	(United States) Logan Sargeant	(South Africa) Jonathan Aberdein	(Germany) Team Motopark	Radical Middle East Cup; Formula Gulf Academy
1	R2	Dubai Autodrome, Dubai (National layout)	19 November		(South Africa) Jonathan Aberdein	(South Africa) Jonathan Aberdein	(Germany) Team Motopark	Radical Middle East Cup; Formula Gulf Academy
1	R3	Dubai Autodrome, Dubai (National layout)	19 November	(South Africa) Jonathan Aberdein	(South Africa) Jonathan Aberdein	(South Africa) Jonathan Aberdein	(Germany) Team Motopark	Radical Middle East Cup; Formula Gulf Academy
2	R1	Yas Marina Circuit, Abu Dhabi (Grand Prix layout)	16 December	(South Africa) Jonathan Aberdein	(South Africa) Jonathan Aberdein	(South Africa) Jonathan Aberdein	(Germany) Team Motopark	Gulf 12 Hours
2	R2	Yas Marina Circuit, Abu Dhabi (Grand Prix layout)	16 December		(United States) Logan Sargeant	(South Africa) Jonathan Aberdein	(Germany) Team Motopark	Gulf 12 Hours
2	R3	Yas Marina Circuit, Abu Dhabi (Grand Prix layout)	17 December	(South Africa) Jonathan Aberdein	(South Africa) Jonathan Aberdein	(South Africa) Jonathan Aberdein	(Germany) Team Motopark	Gulf 12 Hours
2	R4	Yas Marina Circuit, Abu Dhabi (Grand Prix layout)	17 December		(South Africa) Jonathan Aberdein	(South Africa) Jonathan Aberdein	(Germany) Team Motopark	Gulf 12 Hours
2017
3	R1	Dubai Autodrome, Dubai (International layout)	27 January	(South Africa) Jonathan Aberdein	(South Africa) Jonathan Aberdein	(South Africa) Jonathan Aberdein	(Germany) Team Motopark	Porsche GT3 Cup Middle East; Formula Gulf Academy
3	R2	Dubai Autodrome, Dubai (International layout)	28 January		(South Africa) Jonathan Aberdein	(Venezuela) Sebastián Fernández	(Germany) Team Motopark 2	Porsche GT3 Cup Middle East; Formula Gulf Academy
3	R3	Dubai Autodrome, Dubai (International layout)	28 January	(South Africa) Jonathan Aberdein	(United States) Logan Sargeant	(South Africa) Jonathan Aberdein	(Germany) Team Motopark	Porsche GT3 Cup Middle East; Formula Gulf Academy
4	R1	Yas Marina Circuit, Abu Dhabi (Grand Prix layout)	10 February	(South Africa) Jonathan Aberdein	(United States) Logan Sargeant	(South Africa) Jonathan Aberdein	(Germany) Team Motopark	TCR Middle East Series
4	R2	Yas Marina Circuit, Abu Dhabi (Grand Prix layout)	11 February		(South Africa) Jonathan Aberdein	(United Kingdom) Sean Babington	(United Arab Emirates) Energy Dubai F4 Racing Team	TCR Middle East Series
4	R3	Yas Marina Circuit, Abu Dhabi (Grand Prix layout)	11 February	(South Africa) Jonathan Aberdein	(South Africa) Jonathan Aberdein	(South Africa) Jonathan Aberdein	(Germany) Team Motopark	TCR Middle East Series
4	R4	Yas Marina Circuit, Abu Dhabi (Grand Prix layout)	11 February		(South Africa) Jonathan Aberdein	(Switzerland) Fabio Scherer	(United Arab Emirates) Rasgaira Motorsports	TCR Middle East Series
5	R1	Yas Marina Circuit, Abu Dhabi (South layout)	10 March	(South Africa) Jonathan Aberdein	(South Africa) Jonathan Aberdein	(South Africa) Jonathan Aberdein	(Germany) Team Motopark	Toyota 86 Cup; Radical Middle East Cup; Formula Gulf Academy
5	R2	Yas Marina Circuit, Abu Dhabi (South layout)	10 March		(South Africa) Jonathan Aberdein	(South Africa) Jonathan Aberdein	(Germany) Team Motopark	Toyota 86 Cup; Radical Middle East Cup; Formula Gulf Academy
5	R3	Yas Marina Circuit, Abu Dhabi (South layout)	11 March	(South Africa) Jonathan Aberdein	(United States) Logan Sargeant	(South Africa) Jonathan Aberdein	(Germany) Team Motopark	Toyota 86 Cup; Radical Middle East Cup; Formula Gulf Academy
5	R4	Yas Marina Circuit, Abu Dhabi (South layout)	11 March		(South Africa) Jonathan Aberdein	(Netherlands) Leonard Hoogenboom	(Germany) Team Motopark 2	Toyota 86 Cup; Radical Middle East Cup; Formula Gulf Academy

== Championship standings ==
Points were awarded to the top 10 classified finishers in each race.

Position	**1st**	**2nd**	**3rd**	**4th**	**5th**	**6th**	**7th**	**8th**	**9th**	**10th**
Points	25	18	15	12	10	8	6	4	2	1

=== Drivers' Championship ===
Each driver dropped their worst three race results.

Pos	Driver	YMC TE			DUB1			YMC1				DUB2			YMC2				YMC3				Pts
Pos	Driver	YMC TE			R1	R2	R3	R1	R2	R3	R4	R1	R2	R3	R1	R2	R3	R4	R1	R2	R3	R4	Pts
1	(South Africa) Jonathan Aberdein	**1**	1	**1**	**1**	1	**1**	**1**	1	**1**	1	**1**	3	**1**	**1**	7	**1**	2	**1**	1	**1**	5	368
2	(United States) Logan Sargeant	2	2	2	2	2	2	2	2	2	2	3	Ret	2	2	3	2	3	2	Ret	2	Ret	261
3	(United Kingdom) Sean Babington				3	3	4	4	3	3	3	5	5	3	6	1	4	5	3	3	3	2	224
4	(Qatar) Ahmad Al Muhannadi	4	4	4	5	5	5	7	6	5	6	8	6	8	8	8	8	9	7	8	8	4	108
5	(United States) David Malukas							3	4	Ret	4	7	2	5	4	4	10	7					97
6	(Australia) Oscar Piastri							6	5	4	5	4	4	6	3	6	3	6					94
7	(Belgium) Charles Weerts											6	Ret	4	7	5	6	8	5	2	5	6	84
8	(Switzerland) Fabio Scherer														5	2	7	1	4	10	4	Ret	77
9	(Qatar) Abdulrahman Tolefat	5	5	Ret	6	6	6	8	7	6	7	9	7	9	9	9	9	10	8	9	10	7	74
10	(Venezuela) Sebastián Fernández											2	1	7	10	10	5	4					65
11	(Republic of Ireland) James Roe				4	4	3	5	DNS														49
12	(United Arab Emirates) Saif ben Sulayem	6	6	Ret	DNS			9	8	7	8								10	7	11	8	27
13	(Netherlands) Leonard Hoogenboom																		11	4	6	1	25
14	(Sweden) Lucas Petersson																		9	6	9	3	15
15	(China) Sun Yueyang																		6	5	7	9	10
	(India) Ricky Donison	3	3	3																			0
	(United Arab Emirates) Amna Al Qubaisi				DNS																		0
Pos	Driver	YMC TE			R1	R2	R3	R1	R2	R3	R4	R1	R2	R3	R1	R2	R3	R4	R1	R2	R3	R4	Pts
Pos	Driver	YMC TE			DUB1			YMC1				DUB2			YMC2				YMC3				Pts

Colour	Result
Gold	Winner
Silver	Second place
Bronze	Third place
Green	Points classification
Blue	Non-points classification
Blue	Non-classified finish (NC)
Purple	Retired, not classified (Ret)
Red	Did not qualify (DNQ)
Red	Did not pre-qualify (DNPQ)
Black	Disqualified (DSQ)
White	Did not start (DNS)
White	Withdrew (WD)
White	Race cancelled (C)
Blank	Did not practice (DNP)
Blank	Did not arrive (DNA)
Blank	Excluded (EX)

**Bold** – Pole
Italics – Fastest Lap

=== Teams' championship ===
Pos	Team	Points
1	(Germany) Team Motopark	629
2	(United Arab Emirates) Energy Dubai F4 Racing Team	239
3	(United Arab Emirates) Rasgaira Motorsports	234
4	Qatar Motor and Motorcycle Federation	182
5	(Germany) Team Motopark 2	174
6	(United Arab Emirates) Dragon F4	104
