= Drivex =

Spanish auto racing team

(Spain) Drivex
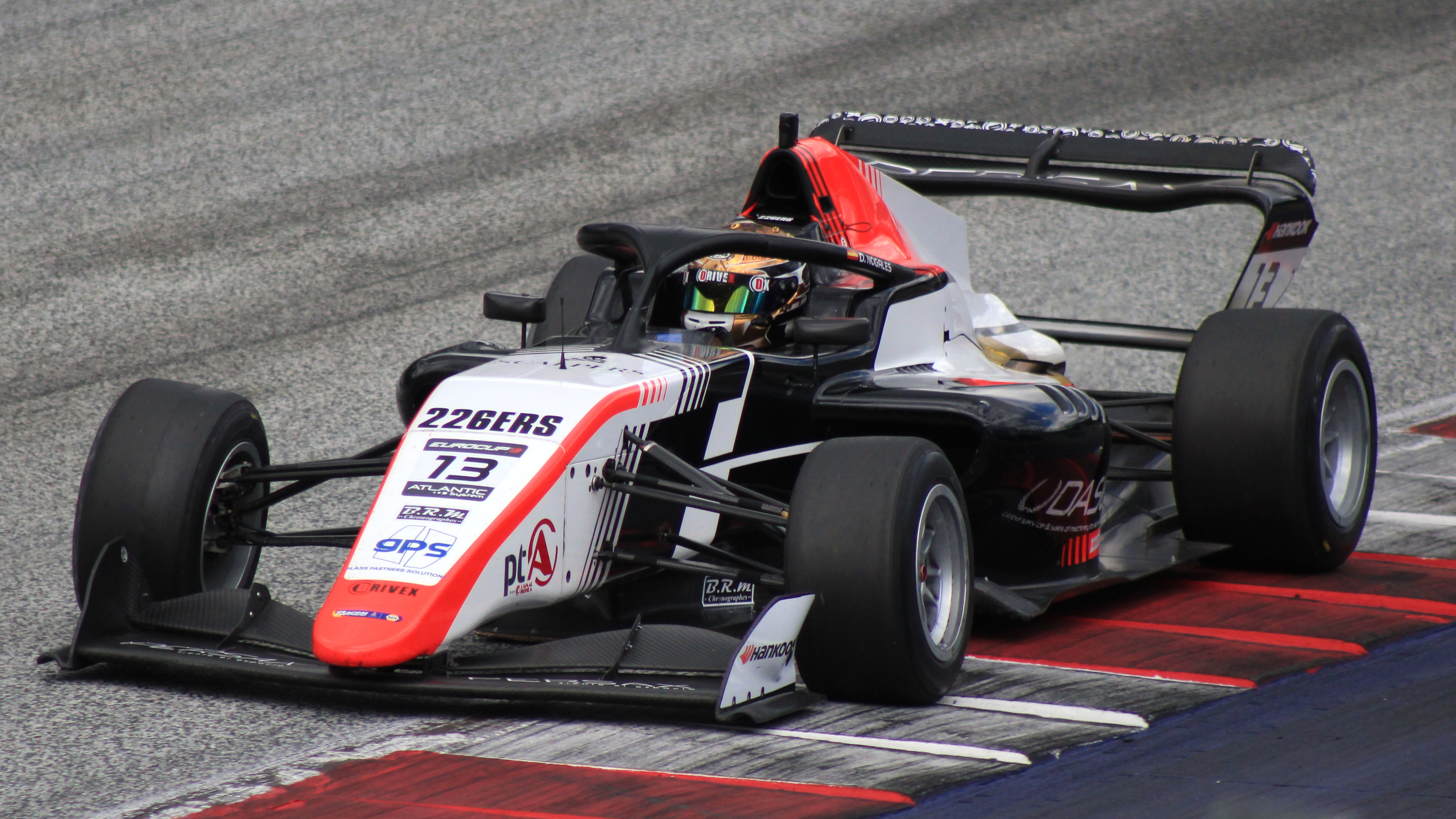
- Founded: 2005
- Team principal(s): Miguel Ángel de Castro
- Founder(s): Miguel Ángel de Castro; Pedro de la Rosa
- Current series: F4 Spanish Championship; Formula Winter Series; Eurocup-3
- Former series: Spanish GT Championship; Euroformula Open Championship; International GT Open; Formula Renault Eurocup
- Current drivers: Eurocup-3; 3. (France) Édouard Borgna; 6. (Greece) Stylianos Kolovos; 7. (Lebanon) Christopher El Feghali; 37. (Brazil) Filippo Fiorentino; Formula 4; 28. (Portugal) Max Radeck; 32. (Argentina) Simón Bulbarella; 44. (Sweden) Elliot Kaczynski; 46. (United Kingdom) Nathan Tye; 71. (Monaco) Sam Urus; 80. (Mexico) Sebastián Frigolet
- Teams' Championships: F4 Spanish Championship; 2019
- Drivers' Championships: F4 Spanish Championship; 2019: (Argentina) Franco Colapinto

Drivex is an auto racing team and school based in Spain. The team was founded by Pedro de la Rosa and Miguel Ángel de Castro in 2005 as a racing school. The racing team is run by Miguel Ángel de Castro. They compete in the F4 Spanish Championship and Eurocup-3.

== History ==
=== Single-seaters ===
Since 2009, Drivex have been contesting the Euroformula Open Championship, with the likes of Celso Míguez, Ferdinand Habsburg and Nikita Troitskiy achieving top three finishes in the drivers' championships.

In November 2018, Drivex expanded into the Formula Renault Eurocup championship for 2019, in collaboration with Fernando Alonso's FA Racing outfit.

== Current series results ==
=== F4 Spanish Championship ===
Year	Car	Drivers	Races	Wins	Poles	F.L.	Points	D.C.	T.C.
2016	Tatuus F4-T014	(Russia) Nikita Volegov	20	0	1	0	188	5th	2nd
2016	Tatuus F4-T014	(Spain) Antolín González	8	0	0	0	0	NC	2nd
2016	Tatuus F4-T014	(Russia) Aleksandr Vartanyan	18	0	2	1	244	2nd	2nd
2016	Tatuus F4-T014	(Spain) Marta García	11	0	0	0	0	NC	2nd
2017	Tatuus F4-T014	(Spain) Javier Cobián	3	0	0	0	7	17th	3rd
2017	Tatuus F4-T014	(Mexico) Javier González	17	0	0	0	146	5th	3rd
2017	Tatuus F4-T014	(Russia) Ivan Berets	14	0	0	0	41	10th	3rd
2017	Tatuus F4-T014	(Canada) Jakes Caouette	20	0	0	0	9	16th	3rd
2018	Tatuus F4-T014	(Mexico) Javier González	14	6	4	0	196	3rd	2nd
2018	Tatuus F4-T014	(Malaysia) Nazim Azman†	3	0	0	0	179	4th	2nd
2018	Tatuus F4-T014	(Angola) Rui Andrade	14	0	0	0	43	12th	2nd
2018	Tatuus F4-T014	(Spain) Rafael Villanueva Jr.†	10	0	0	0	90	6th	2nd
2018	Tatuus F4-T014	(Poland) Filip Kaminiarz	14	0	0	0	14	15th	2nd
2018	Tatuus F4-T014	(Argentina) Franco Colapinto	4	1	0	0	33	9th	2nd
2018	Tatuus F4-T014	(Denmark) Benjamin Goethe	17	0	0	0	39	13th	2nd
2019	Tatuus F4-T014	(Russia) Irina Sidorkova	18	0	0	0	15	18th	1st
2019	Tatuus F4-T014	(Portugal) Manuel Espírito Santo	3	0	0	0	0	NC	1st
2019	Tatuus F4-T014	(Russia) Artem Lobanenko	21	0	0	2	77	9th	1st
2019	Tatuus F4-T014	(Lebanon) Rashed Ghanem	15	1	0	0	61	10th	1st
2019	Tatuus F4-T014	(Denmark) Oliver Goethe	3	0	0	0	0	NC	1st
2019	Tatuus F4-T014	(Russia) Ivan Nosov	20	0	0	0	47	13th	1st
2019	Tatuus F4-T014	(Argentina) Franco Colapinto	21	11	10	10	325	1st	1st
2019	Tatuus F4-T014	(Portugal) Frederico Alfonso Peters	3	0	0	0	0	20th	1st
2020	Tatuus F4-T014	(Portugal) Manuel Silva	3	0	0	0	1	24th	2nd
2020	Tatuus F4-T014	(Russia) Ivan Nosov	18	0	0	0	85	7th	2nd
2020	Tatuus F4-T014	(Switzerland) Léna Bühler	20	0	0	0	23	15th	2nd
2020	Tatuus F4-T014	(Russia) Maksim Arkhangelskiy	3	0	0	0	0	27th	2nd
2020	Tatuus F4-T014	(France) Paul-Adrien Pallot	21	0	0	0	51	12th	2nd
2020	Tatuus F4-T014	(France) Augustin Callinot	9	0	0	0	20	16th	2nd
2020	Tatuus F4-T014	(Portugal) Guilherme Oliveira	3	0	0	0	16	19th	2nd
2020	Tatuus F4-T014	(Colombia) Nicolás Baptiste	3	0	0	0	0	26th	2nd
2020	Tatuus F4-T014	(Denmark) Valdemar Eriksen	15	1	0	0	51	11th	2nd
2021	Tatuus F4-T014	(Russia) Maksim Arkhangelskiy	21	0	0	0	81	9th	4th
2021	Tatuus F4-T014	(Portugal) Guilherme Oliveira	18	0	0	1	46	13th	4th
2021	Tatuus F4-T014	(France) Noam Abramczyk	21	0	0	1	38	14th	4th
2021	Tatuus F4-T014	(United Kingdom) Branden Lee Oxley	21	0	0	0	12	19th	4th
2021	Tatuus F4-T014	(France) Lola Lovinfosse	21	0	0	0	0	27th	4th
2021	Tatuus F4-T014	(Slovakia) Lukáš Málek	6	0	0	0	0	30th	4th
2021	Tatuus F4-T014	(United Kingdom) Georgi Dimitrov	3	0	0	0	0	32nd	4th
2022	Tatuus F4-T421	(France) Gaël Julien	21	0	0	0	60	11th	4th
2022	Tatuus F4-T421	(Spain) Daniel Nogales†	21	0	0	0	26	14th	4th
2022	Tatuus F4-T421	(Spain) Bruno del Pino	21	0	0	0	24	16th	4th
2022	Tatuus F4-T421	(Spain) Maksim Arkhangelskiy	21	0	0	0	0	24th	4th
2022	Tatuus F4-T421	(Australia) Noah Lisle	9	0	0	0	0	29th	4th
2022	Tatuus F4-T421	(Italy) Victoria Blokhina	3	0	0	0	0	NC	4th
2023	Tatuus F4-T421	(Spain) Juan Cota	21	0	0	0	14	15th	8th
2023	Tatuus F4-T421	(Spain) Daniel Nogales	9	0	0	0	5	18th	8th
2023	Tatuus F4-T421	(Kazakhstan) Alexander Abkhazava	21	0	0	0	2	24th	8th
2023	Tatuus F4-T421	(Colombia) Joao Paulo Diaz Balesteiro	3	0	0	0	0	NC	8th
2023	Tatuus F4-T421	(Spain) Alexander Bolduev	3	0	0	0	0	29th	12th
2023	Tatuus F4-T421	(Kyrgyzstan) Georgy Zhuravskiy	15	0	0	0	0	34th	12th
2023	Tatuus F4-T421	(Colombia) Maximiliano Restrepo	20	0	0	0	0	37th	12th
2024	Tatuus F4-T421	(Spain) Juan Cota	21	4	1	4	186	4th	6th
2024	Tatuus F4-T421	(Denmark) Mikkel Gaarde Pedersen	12	0	0	0	3	23rd	6th
2024	Tatuus F4-T421	(Slovakia) Matúš Ryba	21	0	0	0	0	28th	6th
2024	Tatuus F4-T421	(Austria) Oscar Wurz†	5	0	0	0	0	29th	6th
2024	Tatuus F4-T421	(Lebanon) Christopher El Feghali	6	0	0	0	0	NC	6th
2024	Tatuus F4-T421	(Portugal) Francisco Macedo	20	0	0	0	9	21st	10th
2024	Tatuus F4-T421	(Spain) Daniel Nogales	3	0	0	0	0	26th	10th
2024	Tatuus F4-T421	(Argentina) Gino Trappa	3	0	0	0	0	42nd	10th
2024	Tatuus F4-T421	(Spain) Eloi González†	4	0	0	0	0	44th	10th
2024	Tatuus F4-T421	(France) Pacôme Weisenburger	0	0	0	0	0	NC	10th
2024	Tatuus F4-T421	(Australia) Joanne Ciconte	6	0	0	0	0	NC	10th
2025	Tatuus F4-T421	(Lebanon) Christopher El Feghali	21	0	0	1	53	13th	6th
2025	Tatuus F4-T421	(Argentina) Gino Trappa	18	0	0	0	11	16th	6th
2025	Tatuus F4-T421	(Brazil) Filippo Fiorentino	21	0	0	0	3	20th	6th
2025	Tatuus F4-T421	(Kyrgyzstan) Kirill Kutskov	3	0	0	0	0	NC	6th
2025	Tatuus F4-T421	(United Arab Emirates) Kaiden Higgins	18	0	0	0	1	21st	10th
2025	Tatuus F4-T421	(Sweden) Stepan Suslov	21	0	0	0	0	28th	10th
2025	Tatuus F4-T421	(Spain) Edu Robinson	3	0	0	0	0	32nd	10th
2025	Tatuus F4-T421	(Brazil) Ricardo Baptista	6	0	0	0	0	37th	10th
2025	Tatuus F4-T421	(Kyrgyzstan) Artem Severiukhin	3	0	0	0	0	38th	10th
2025	Tatuus F4-T421	(Brazil) Rafaela Ferreira	3	0	0	0	0	39th	10th
2026	Tatuus F4-T421	(United Kingdom) Nathan Tye	21	2	3	1	157	7th	4th
2026	Tatuus F4-T421	(Sweden) Elliot Kaczynski	21	2	3	3	131	8th	4th
2026	Tatuus F4-T421	(Argentina) Simón Bulbarella	21	0	0	0	0	26th	4th
2026	Tatuus F4-T421	(Portugal) Max Radeck	21	0	0	0	10	17th	10th
2026	Tatuus F4-T421	(Mexico) Sebastián Frigolet	21	0	0	0	0	31st	10th
2026	Tatuus F4-T421	(Monaco) Sam Urus†	9	0	0	0	0	41st	10th
2026	Tatuus F4-T421	(United States) Dean Pedersen	6	0	0	0	0	42nd	10th
2026	Tatuus F4-T421	(Argentina) Jorge Bruno	6	0	0	0	0	44th	10th
2026	Tatuus F4-T421	(Brazil) Eli Steinbruch	3	0	0	0	0	53rd	10th

^{†} Shared results with other teams

=== Eurocup-3 ===
Year	Car	Drivers	Races	Wins	Poles	F.L.	Points	D.C.	T.C.
2023	Tatuus F3 T-318	(Canada) Nick Gilkes	16	0	0	0	37	11th	4th
2023	Tatuus F3 T-318	(Spain) Daniel Nogales	12	0	0	0	36	12th	4th
2023	Tatuus F3 T-318	(France) Pierre-Louis Chovet	2	0	0	0	14	16th	4th
2023	Tatuus F3 T-318	(Sweden) William Karlsson	6	0	0	0	6	17th	4th
2023	Tatuus F3 T-318	(United States) David Morales	2	0	0	0	0	21st	4th
2023	Tatuus F3 T-318	(Kyrgyzstan) Georgy Zhuravskiy	4	0	0	0	0	24th	4th
2024	Tatuus F3 T-318	(France) Hadrien David	2	0	0	0	8	18th	6th
2024	Tatuus F3 T-318	(Sweden) Linus Hellberg	6	0	0	0	0	NC	6th
2024	Tatuus F3 T-318	(Sweden) Emil Hellberg	6	0	0	0	0	NC	6th
2024	Tatuus F3 T-318	(Colombia) Joao Paulo Diaz Balesteiro	9	0	0	0	0	26th	6th
2024	Tatuus F3 T-318	(Colombia) Joao Paulo Diaz Balesteiro	2	0	0	0	0	26th	7th
2024	Tatuus F3 T-318	(Spain) Daniel Nogales†	16	0	0	1	23	15th	7th
2024	Tatuus F3 T-318	(Kyrgyzstan) Georgy Zhuravskiy†	16	0	0	0	2	22nd	7th
2024	Tatuus F3 T-318	(Canada) Nick Gilkes	12	0	0	0	1	23rd	7th
2024	Tatuus F3 T-318	(Kyrgyzstan) Victoria Blokhina	15	0	0	0	0	27th	7th
2024	Tatuus F3 T-318	(Switzerland) Gaspard Le Gallais	16	0	0	0	0	28th	7th
2024	Tatuus F3 T-318	(Italy) Nikita Bedrin	2	0	0	0	0	NC	7th
2024	Tatuus F3 T-318	(Kyrgyzstan) Michael Belov	2	0	0	0	0	NC	7th
2024	Tatuus F3 T-318	(United States) Preston Lambert	2	0	0	0	0	NC	7th
2025	Tatuus F3 T-318	(Kyrgyzstan) Michael Belov†	4	0	0	0	28	15th	8th
2025	Tatuus F3 T-318	(Austria) Oscar Wurz	16	0	0	0	6	18th	8th
2025	Tatuus F3 T-318	(Lebanon) Christopher El Feghali	2	0	0	0	0	24th	8th
2025	Tatuus F3 T-318	(Spain) Edu Robinson	3	0	0	0	0	25th	8th
2025	Tatuus F3 T-318	(United States) Preston Lambert	12	0	0	0	0	26th	8th
2025	Tatuus F3 T-318	(Mexico) Jorge Garciarce	6	0	0	0	0	27th	8th
2025	Tatuus F3 T-318	(Mexico) Cristian Cantú	7	0	0	0	0	28th	8th
2025	Tatuus F3 T-318	(Venezuela) Alessandro Famularo	12	0	0	0	0	30th	8th
2025	Tatuus F3 T-318	(Spain) Lucas Fluxá	2	0	0	0	0	33rd	8th
2025	Tatuus F3 T-318	(Poland) Wiktor Dobrzański	6	0	0	0	0	37th	8th
2025	Tatuus F3 T-318	(Brazil) Filippo Fiorentino	4	0	0	0	0	38th	8th
2025	Tatuus F3 T-318	(Hungary) Ádám Hideg	2	0	0	0	0	NC	8th
2025	Tatuus F3 T-318	(Mexico) Alan Orzynski	2	0	0	0	0	NC	8th
2025	Tatuus F3 T-318	(Vietnam) Owen Tangavelou†	5	0	0	0	0	22nd	10th
2025	Tatuus F3 T-318	(Brazil) Ricardo Baptista	2	0	0	0	0	NC	10th
2026	Dallara 326-TOM'S	(Lebanon) Christopher El Feghali	19	1	2	1	64	10th	6th
2026	Dallara 326-TOM'S	(Brazil) Filippo Fiorentino	19	0	0	0	2	20th	6th
2026	Dallara 326-TOM'S	(Greece) Stylianos Kolovos	19	0	0	0	0	32nd	6th
2026	Dallara 326-TOM'S	(United Kingdom) Nathan Tye	2	0	0	0	0	36th	6th
2026	Dallara 326-TOM'S	(France) Édouard Borgna	8	0	0	0	0	39th	6th
2026	Dallara 326-TOM'S	(Monaco) Sam Urus	5	0	0	0	0	43rd	6th
2026	Dallara 326-TOM'S	(Austria) Oscar Wurz	2	0	0	0	0	NC	6th
2026	Dallara 326-TOM'S	(Brazil) Bernardo Gentil	2	0	0	0	0	NC	6th

† Shared results with other teams.

=== Formula 4 CEZ Championship ===
Year	Car	Drivers	Races	Wins	Poles	F.L.	Points	D.C.	T.C.
2026	Tatuus F4-T421	(Brazil) Filippo Fiorentino							
2026	Tatuus F4-T421	(Poland) Piotr Orcholski							
2026	Tatuus F4-T421	(Argentina) Jorge Bruno							
2026	Tatuus F4-T421	(Sweden) Leo Nilsson							
2026	Tatuus F4-T421	(Mexico) Sebastian Frigolet							
2026	Tatuus F4-T421	(Argentina) Simon Bulbarella							
2026	Tatuus F4-T421	(Spain) Bosco Arias							

=== Euroformula Open Championship ===
Year	Car	Drivers	Races	Wins	Poles	F.L.	Points	D.C.	T.C.
2009	Dallara F308 Fiat	(Spain) Celso Míguez	16	5	3	2	145	2nd	2nd
2009	Dallara F306 Fiat	(Spain) Luis Villalba	2	0	0	0	0	27th	2nd
2009	Dallara F306 Fiat	(Spain) José Luis Abadín	10	0	0	0	16	15th	2nd
2009	Dallara F306 Fiat	(Japan) Ryuichi Nara	2	0	0	0	0	30th	2nd
2010	Dallara F308 Toyota	(Spain) José Luis Abadín	10	0	0	0	43	7th	4th
2010	Dallara F308 Toyota	(Spain) Pedro Quesada	4	0	0	0	18	15th	4th
2010	Dallara F306 Toyota	(Spain) Aaron Filgueira	16	1	0	1	46	6th	4th
2011	Dallara F308 Toyota	(Spain) Fernando Monje	16	0	0	1	27	15th	8th
2011	Dallara F306 Toyota	(Spain) Pedro Quesada	4	0	0	0	0	25th†	8th
2011	Dallara F306 Toyota	(Spain) Luis Villalba	2	0	0	0	0	NC	8th
2011	Dallara F306 Toyota	(Spain) Cristian Serrada	6	0	0	0	0	NC	8th
2012	Dallara F308 Toyota	(Spain) José Luis Abadín	2	0	0	0	0	NC	9th
2012	Dallara F308 Toyota	(Spain) Cristian Serrada	10	0	0	0	0	25th	9th
2013	Dallara F308 Toyota	(Slovakia) Richard Gonda	16	0	0	0	10	18th	NC
2014: "Drivex" did not compete.
2015	Dallara F312 Toyota	(Austria) Ferdinand Habsburg	2	0	0	0	0	NC	NC
2016	Dallara F312 Toyota	(Austria) Ferdinand Habsburg	16	2	4	1	247	2nd	2nd
2016	Dallara F312 Toyota	(Russia) Nikita Troitskiy	4	0	1	0	36	13th	2nd
2016	Dallara F312 Toyota	(Russia) Vasily Romanov	4	0	0	0	0	NC	2nd
2017	Dallara F312 Toyota	(Brazil) Christian Hahn	16	0	0	0	11	16th	3rd
2017	Dallara F312 Toyota	(India) Tarun Reddy	16	0	0	0	26	14th†	3rd
2017	Dallara F312 Toyota	(Russia) Nikita Troitskiy	16	0	2	4	222	2nd	3rd
2018	Dallara F312 Toyota	(Germany) Jannes Fittje	6	0	0	0	22	12th	5th
2018	Dallara F312 Toyota	(Austria) Lukas Dunner	16	0	0	0	81	7th	5th
2018	Dallara F312 Toyota	(Brazil) Christian Hahn	12	0	0	0	29	10th	5th
2018	Dallara F312 Toyota	(Switzerland) Patrick Schott	2	0	0	0	0	NC	5th
2018	Dallara F312 Toyota	(Mexico) Javier González	4	0	0	0	0	NC	5th
2019	Dallara F317 Toyota	(Romania) Petru Florescu	2	0	0	0	0	26th	7th
2019	Dallara F317 Toyota	(Argentina) Franco Colapinto	2	0	0	0	0	27th	7th
2019	Dallara F317 Toyota	(Angola) Rui Andrade	3	0	0	0	6	22nd	7th
2019	Dallara F317 Mercedes-Benz	(Angola) Rui Andrade	15	0	0	0	6	22nd	7th
2019	Dallara F317 Mercedes-Benz	(Poland) Filip Kaminiarz	2	0	0	0	0	NC	7th
2020	Dallara 320 Mercedes-Benz	(Netherlands) Glenn van Berlo	18	0	0	0	80	9th	6th
2020	Dallara 320 Mercedes-Benz	(Oman) Shihab Al Habsi	6	0	0	0	6	17th	6th
2020	Dallara 320 Mercedes-Benz	(Mexico) Rafael Villagómez	4	0	0	0	0	NC	6th
2021	Dallara 320 Mercedes-Benz	(Italy) Enzo Trulli†	21	0	0	1	144	7th	5th
2021	Dallara 320 Mercedes-Benz	(United States) Enzo Scionti	24	0	0	0	33	14th	5th
2021	Dallara 320 Mercedes-Benz	(Paraguay) Joshua Dürksen	3	0	0	0	29	17th	5th
2021	Dallara 320 Mercedes-Benz	(United Kingdom) Branden Lee Oxley	3	0	0	0	13	19th	5th
2021	Dallara 320 Mercedes-Benz	(Chile) Nico Pino	3	0	0	0	4	22nd	5th
2021	Dallara 320 Mercedes-Benz	(United Kingdom) Dexter Patterson	3	0	0	0	0	NC	5th
2022	Dallara 320 Mercedes-Benz	(United Kingdom) Ayrton Simmons	9	0	0	1	85	10th	5th
2022	Dallara 320 Mercedes-Benz	(Australia) Alex Peroni	3	0	0	0	23	13th	5th
2022	Dallara 320 Mercedes-Benz	(Chile) Nico Pino	8	0	0	0	20	14th	5th
2022	Dallara 320 Mercedes-Benz	(Hungary) Benjámin Berta	3	0	0	0	14	15th	5th
2022	Dallara 320 Mercedes-Benz	(Spain) Daniel Nogales	3	0	0	0	4	16th	5th
2026	Dallara 324-TOM'S	(Argentina) Gino Trappa	6	0	0	1	56	11th	3rd
2026	Dallara 324-TOM'S	(Brazil) Filippo Fiorentino	6	1	0	0	46	12th	3rd
2026	Dallara 324-TOM'S	(Brazil) Celo Hahn†	6	0	0	0	9	19th	3rd

^{†} Shared results with other teams

== Former series results ==
=== Formula Renault Eurocup ===
Year	Car	Drivers	Races	Wins	Poles	F.L.	Points	D.C.	T.C.
2019	Tatuus F3 T-318-Renault	(United States) Brad Benavides	13	0	0	0	0	23rd	8th
2019	Tatuus F3 T-318-Renault	(South Africa) Callan O'Keeffe	10	0	0	0	15	17th	8th
2019	Tatuus F3 T-318-Renault	(Angola) Rui Andrade	2	0	0	0	0	26th	8th
2019	Tatuus F3 T-318-Renault	(Switzerland) Patrick Schott	12	0	0	0	0	22nd	8th
2019	Tatuus F3 T-318-Renault	(Argentina) Franco Colapinto	4	0	0	0	0	NC	8th
2019	Tatuus F3 T-318-Renault	(Poland) Alex Karkosik	4	0	0	0	1	21st	8th
2020	Tatuus F3 T-318-Renault	(Belgium) Amaury Cordeel	19	0	0	0	33	15th	7th
2020	Tatuus F3 T-318-Renault	(United Kingdom) Abbi Pulling	2	0	0	0	0	NC	7th
2020	Tatuus F3 T-318-Renault	(Netherlands) Tijmen van der Helm	18	0	0	0	45	12th	7th

=== Formula Winter Series ===
Year	Car	Drivers	Races	Wins	Poles	F.L.	Points	D.C.	T.C.
2023	Tatuus F4-T421	(Spain) Juan Cota	4	0	0	0	36	8th	N/A
2023	Tatuus F4-T421	(Colombia) Maximiliano Restrepo	4	0	0	0	6	17th	N/A
2024	Tatuus F4-T421	(Spain) Juan Cota	9	1	0	1	64	6th	4th
2024	Tatuus F4-T421	(Denmark) Mikkel Gaarde Pedersen	11	0	1	0	55	8th	4th
2024	Tatuus F4-T421	(Portugal) Francisco Macedo	11	0	0	0	0	35th	4th

== Timeline ==
Current Series
Euroformula Open Championship	2009–2013, 2015–2022, 2026–present
F4 Spanish Championship	2016–present
Eurocup-3	2023–present
Formula 4 CEZ Championship	2026–present
Former Series
Spanish GT Championship	2008–2009, 2011
International GT Open	2010, 2012–2018
24H Series	2015–2016
Formula Renault Eurocup	2019
Formula Winter Series	2023–2024
