= Rui Andrade (racing driver) =

Angolan racing driver

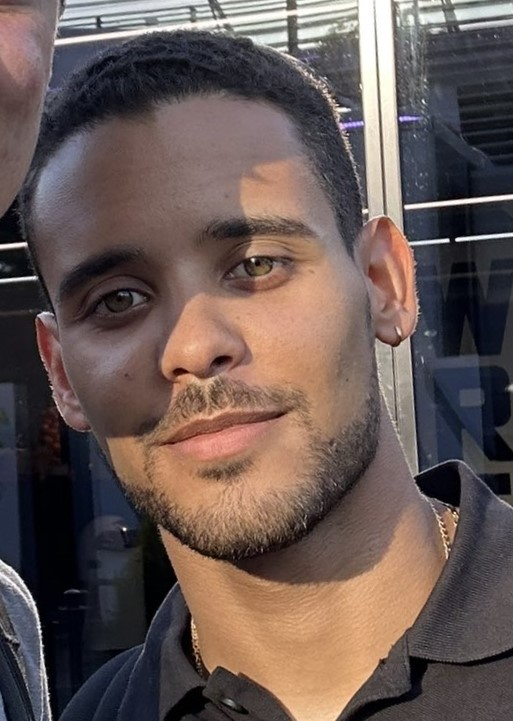
- Andrade in 2023
- Nationality: (Angola) Angolan (Portugal) Portuguese via dual nationality
- Born: Rui Pinto de Andrade; 23 September 1999 (age 27) Luanda, Angola

WEC career
- Debut season: 2021
- Current team: Iron Lynx
- Categorisation: FIA Silver
- Car number: 61
- Former teams: G-Drive Racing, Team WRT, TF Sport
- Starts: 39
- Wins: 5
- Podiums: 13
- Poles: 2
- Fastest laps: 0
- Best finish: 1st in 2023 (LMP2)

Previous series
- 2021 2019–2020 2020 2019 2019 2018: Asian Le Mans Series; Euroformula Open Championship; Toyota Racing Series; Formula 4 UAE Championship; Formula Renault Eurocup; F4 Spanish Championship

Rui Pinto de Andrade (born 23 September 1999) is an Angolan-Portuguese racing driver who is currently racing in the LMGT3 class of the FIA World Endurance Championship for TF Sport.

Andrade won the LMP2 Pro-Am subclass title in the 2021 European Le Mans Series and became the last LMP2 class champion of the FIA World Endurance Championship in 2023. He also won the 2025 European Le Mans Series title in the LMGT3 class. Andrade is the first Angolan to win an international motorsport title.

== Early career ==
=== Karting ===
According to his own website, Andrade began racing karts at the age of twelve. He raced in the Angolan championship and also took part in a round of the Portuguese championship in 2017.

=== Spanish F4 Championship ===
Andrade's first experience in single-seaters came in 2018, where he competed for Drivex in the F4 Spanish Championship. He competed from the second round in Valencia until the end of the season, finishing 12th in the standings, having achieved his best results at Barcelona and Navarra where he finished fifth respectively.

=== Formula 4 UAE Championship ===
Andrade drove for Emirate team Dragon Racing in the 2019 Formula 4 UAE Championship. With 201 points, Andrade attained fifth in the standings while standing on the podium six times, none of which were wins however two of them were second places. The two second places came at the first race at Dubai Autodrome and second race at Yas Marina Circuit.

=== Toyota Racing Series ===
At the 2020 Toyota Racing Series, Andrade raced for M2 Competition alongside the top two driver in the championship, Igor Fraga and Liam Lawson. Andrade won 70 points over the course of the season meaning he finished 16th, two points behind French teammate Émilien Denner. Two ninth places were the Andrade's best results at the first two races at Pukekohe Park.

=== Euroformula Open Championship ===
Andrade's first season at the Euroformula Open Championship was in 2019 with Spanish outfit Drivex Racing. Andrade only finished in the points once and it was at the last round in Monza, ultimately this contributed to a 22nd-place finish with six points.

In 2020, Andrade switched to CryptoTower Racing, driving alongside Yifei Ye. Whilst Andrade improved compared to the previous year, scoring points in the majority of races, he ended up 14th in the standings.

== Endurance racing ==
=== 2021: ALMS, ELMS and Le Mans debut ===
For 2021, Andrade made the transition to sportscars, signing up to compete in the Asian and European Le Mans Series with G-Drive Racing. The former championship would yield major success, as Andrade and his teammates, John Falb and Franco Colapinto scored three podiums, leading the team to finish third in the standings. Meanwhile, their European efforts were just as successful, with six class podiums out of six race starts, including an overall podium at the Red Bull Ring. At the final round, Andrade secured the Pro-Am title alongside Falb. That year, he also took part at the 24 Hours of Le Mans, where he retired following a nighttime accident on the runup to Dunlop bridge.

=== 2022: WEC and first victory ===
Andrade racing at the 2022 24 Hours of Le Mans.

The following season, Andrade competed in the World Endurance Championship on a full-time basis, partnering Ferdinand Habsburg and Norman Nato at RealTeam by WRT. Having taken two podiums in the opening two races, the outfit experienced a disappointing Le Mans, finishing 17th in class. That result was quickly forgotten, with Andrade and his teammates taking victory at the 6 Hours of Monza, thus making Andrade the first Angolan to win an FIA-sanctioned World Championship race. A pair of top-five finishes ended their season, with the team ending up fourth in the championship.

In addition, Andrade raced in the Michelin Endurance Cup races of the IMSA SportsCar Championship, where he took three class podiums including a victory at Petit Le Mans for Tower Motorsport alongside Louis Delétraz and John Farano.

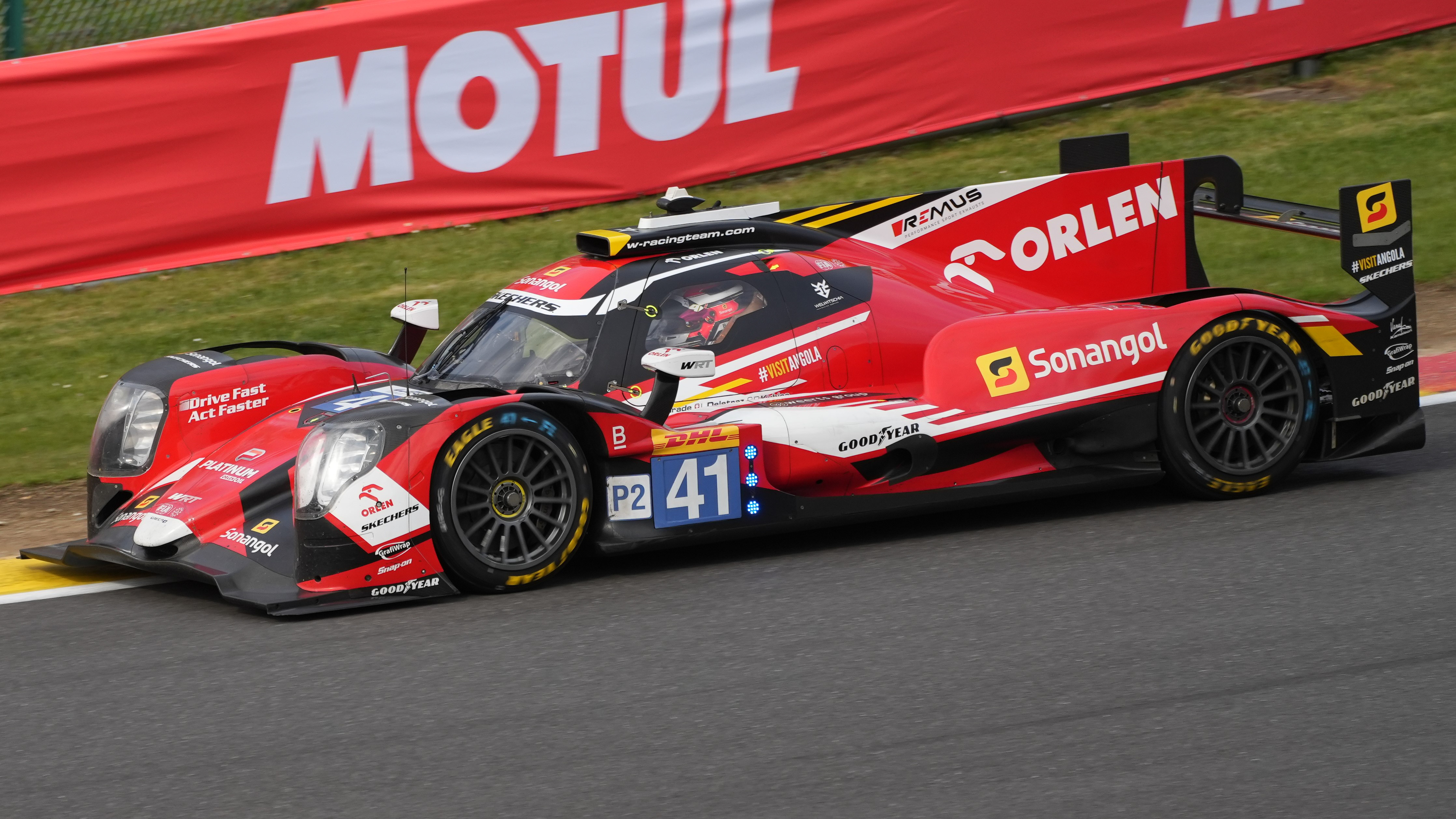
Andrade would win the LMP2 class here at the 2023 6 Hours of Spa-Francorchamps.

=== 2023: Return to WRT and WEC Title ===
Andrade returned to Team WRT for the 2023 WEC season, where he would be driving alongside 2022 Prema teammates Louis Delétraz and Robert Kubica. Andrade also took on a full-season effort in the European Le Mans Series with Inter Europol Competition, where he joined Olli Caldwell and Jonathan Aberdein.

After starting the WEC campaign with a fifth-placed finish at Sebring, Andrade and his teammates began their title charge at Portimão, scoring a podium as a result of a late-race overtake by Delétraz for third place. The 6 Hours of Spa-Francorchamps provided even more momentum, with the No. 41 taking their first victory of the season. At the 24 Hours of Le Mans, Andrade, Kubica and Delétraz managed to finish second, missing out only to the No. 34 of Inter Europol Competition, before expanding their championship lead at Monza, where another third place would be added to their tally. Despite a collision with Josh Pierson during his opening stint, Andrade managed to help his squad to victory at the 6 Hours of Fuji, which put them in a near-championship-clinching position going into the season finale in Bahrain. There, both WRTs ran at the front, and with an issue at the final pit stop throwing the sister No. 31 car to second, the No. 41 crew were able to cross the finish line first, thereby winning the final championship of the LMP2 class in the WEC.

=== 2024: GT switch ===
Having made his GT racing debut at the start of 2024, driving for Dragon Racing in the AsLMS, Andrade embarked on a WEC campaign in the LMGT3 class. He partnered Corvette factory driver Charlie Eastwood and bronze Tom van Rompuy at TF Sport, whilst also signing up to IMSA's GTD class with Lone Star Racing, driving in the endurance rounds. In a season described as a "character-building" one for the Corvette brand, Andrade and his teammates scored a closely-fought second at Bahrain and finished tenth in the drivers' standings. In the States, Andrade scored a best finish of eighth at Daytona.

=== 2025: ELMS LMGT3 title ===
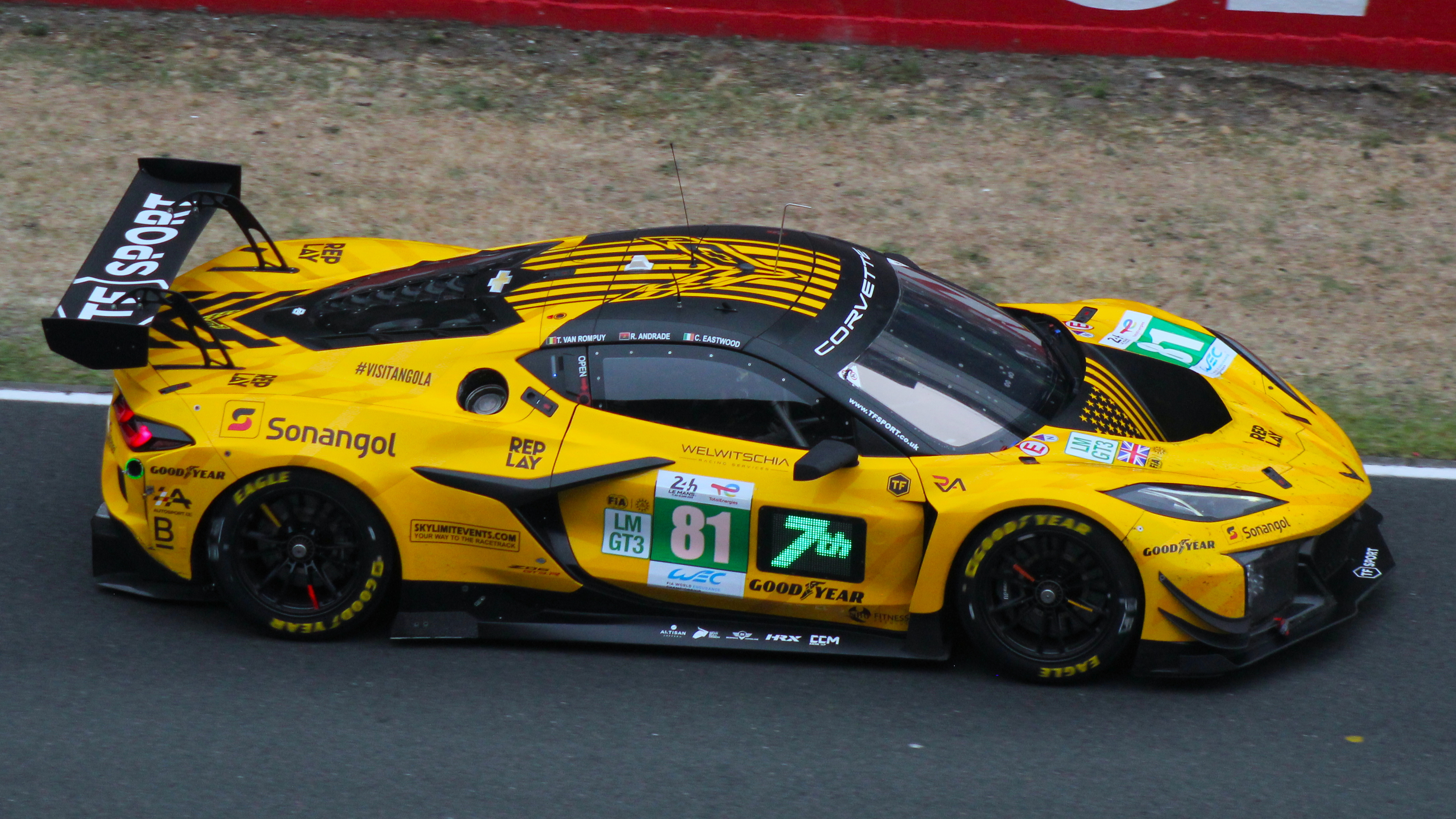
Andrade's No. 81 car at the 2025 24 Hours of Le Mans

Andrade remained with Corvette and TF Sport in 2025, once again joining Eastwood and van Rompuy in the WEC, and partnering Eastwood and Hiroshi Koizumi in the ELMS. The WEC season started with a retirement in Qatar owing to a broken alternator shaft pulley. Sixth at Imola followed, before the Corvette No. 81 finished 12th in Belgium. Despite complaints from Corvette's drivers about the car's top speed in the prelude of the 24 Hours of Le Mans, a well-executed race from Andrade and his teammates earned them a third place. They combined for back-to-back podiums at São Paulo, finishing second, before scoring a lowly 13th at Cota. At the penultimate round in Fuji, Andrade and his teammates claimed victory thanks to a late time penalty for the leading AF Corse Ferrari.

Andrade's ELMS season started modestly with sixth at Barcelona and a late retirement in Le Castellet. Round three at Imola however put the Corvette crew back into the title fight: though Andrade lost the lead to Matteo Cressoni mid-race, Eastwood returned to the lead and defended it until the end. This win constituted Andrade's first in GT racing, as well as being Corvette's maiden victory in ELMS's LMGT3 class. After finishing eighth in Spa, Andrade returned to the podium with a third place at Silverstone. The final round at Portimão began well, as Koizumi took pole position on Friday. Despite an issue with the rearview camera during his stint, Andrade was able to return the car to Eastwood in the lead. Eastwood then held on to finish first despite the advances of Wayne Boyd, thus earning TF Sport the LMGT3 title.

== Personal life ==
Andrade grew up in the United States, before moving back to his native Angola and later to Portugal. He is managed by Bullet Sport Management.

As part of Angola's 50th anniversary of national independence in 2025, Andrade was awarded the Peace and Development Medal by João Lourenço, the country's president, for his sporting achievements.

== Racing record ==
=== Career summary ===
Season	Series	Team	Races	Wins	Poles	F/Laps	Podiums	Points	Position
2018	F4 Spanish Championship	Drivex School	14	0	0	0	0	43	12th
2019	Formula 4 UAE Championship	Dragon Racing	20	0	0	2	6	201	5th
2019	Euroformula Open Championship	Drivex School	18	0	0	0	0	6	22nd
2019	Formula Ford Portugal	N/A	2	0	0	0	1	20	5th
2019	Formula Renault Eurocup	FA Racing by Drivex	2	0	0	0	0	0	25th
2020	Toyota Racing Series	M2 Competition	15	0	0	0	0	70	16th
2020	Euroformula Open Championship	CryptoTower Racing	18	0	0	0	0	28	14th
2021	Asian Le Mans Series - LMP2	G-Drive Racing	4	0	0	0	3	66	**3rd**
2021	European Le Mans Series - LMP2	G-Drive Racing	6	0	0	0	1	42	8th
2021	FIA World Endurance Championship - LMP2	G-Drive Racing	2	0	0	0	0	0	NC†
2021	24 Hours of Le Mans - LMP2	G-Drive Racing	1	0	0	0	0	—N/a	DNF
2022	FIA World Endurance Championship - LMP2	RealTeam by WRT	6	1	0	0	3	96	4th
2022	24 Hours of Le Mans - LMP2	RealTeam by WRT	1	0	0	0	0	—N/a	17th
2022	IMSA SportsCar Championship - LMP2	Tower Motorsport	4	1	0	0	3	990	12th
2022	European Le Mans Series - LMP2	Duqueine Team	1	0	0	0	0	2	24th
2023	FIA World Endurance Championship - LMP2	Team WRT	7	3	0	0	6	173	**1st**
2023	24 Hours of Le Mans - LMP2	Team WRT	1	0	0	0	1	—N/a	**2nd**
2023	European Le Mans Series - LMP2	Inter Europol Competition	6	0	0	0	1	33	7th
2023–24	Asian Le Mans Series - GT	Dragon Racing	3	0	0	0	0	0	30th
2024	FIA World Endurance Championship - LMGT3	TF Sport	8	0	0	0	1	50	10th
2024	24 Hours of Le Mans - LMGT3	TF Sport	1	0	0	0	0	—N/a	15th
2024	IMSA SportsCar Championship - GTD	Lone Star Racing	5	0	0	0	0	945	38th
2025	FIA World Endurance Championship - LMGT3	TF Sport	8	1	0	0	3	81	5th
2025	24 Hours of Le Mans - LMGT3	TF Sport	1	0	0	0	1	—N/a	**3rd**
2025	European Le Mans Series - LMGT3	TF Sport	6	2	0	0	3	78	**1st**
2026	European Le Mans Series - LMGT3	Iron Lynx	6	0	0	0	0	18	20th
2026	FIA World Endurance Championship - LMGT3	Iron Lynx	8	0	0	0	0	31	17th
2026	GT World Challenge Europe Endurance Cup	Team Motopark	1	0	0	0	0	0	NC

^{†} As Andrade was a guest driver, he was ineligible for championship points.

=== Complete F4 Spanish Championship results ===
(key) (Races in bold indicate pole position) (Races in italics indicate fastest lap)

Year	Team	1	2	3	4	5	6	7	8	9	10	11	12	13	14	15	16	17	18	DC	Points
2018	Drivex School	ARA; 1	ARA; 2	ARA; 3	CRT; 1; 9	CRT; 2; 8	CRT; 3; 9	ALG; 1; 10	ALG; 2; 8	ALG; 3; 6	CAT; 1 C	CAT; 2; 5	JER; 1; 8	JER; 2; 8	JER; 3; 9	NAV; 1; 13	NAV; 2; 8	NAV; 3; 5	NAV; 4; 10	12th	43

=== Complete Formula Renault Eurocup results ===
(key) (Races in bold indicate pole position) (Races in italics indicate fastest lap)

Year	Team	1	2	3	4	5	6	7	8	9	10	11	12	13	14	15	16	17	18	19	20	Pos	Points
2019	Drivex School	MNZ; 1	MNZ; 2	SIL; 1	SIL; 2	MON; 1	MON; 2	LEC; 1	LEC; 2	SPA; 1; 16	SPA; 2; 16	NÜR; 1	NÜR; 2	HUN; 1	HUN; 2	CAT; 1	CAT; 2	HOC; 1	HOC; 2	YMC; 1	YMC; 2	26th	0

=== Complete Formula 4 UAE Championship results ===
(key) (Races in bold indicate pole position; races in italics indicate fastest lap)

Year	Team	1	2	3	4	5	6	7	8	9	10	11	12	13	14	15	16	17	18	19	20	DC	Points
2019	Dragon Racing	DUB1; 1; 6	DUB1; 2; 3	DUB1; 3; 4	DUB1; 4; 2	YMC1; 1; 3	YMC1; 2; 6	YMC1; 3; 4	YMC1; 4; 5	DUB2; 1 Ret	DUB2; 2; 6	DUB2; 3; 8	DUB2; 4; 8	YMC2; 1; 3	YMC2; 2; 2	YMC2; 3; 9	YMC2; 4; 3	DUB3; 1; 4	DUB3; 2; 4	DUB3; 3; 8	DUB3; 4; 7	5th	201

=== Complete Euroformula Open Championship results ===
(key) (Races in bold indicate pole position) (Races in italics indicate fastest lap)

Year	Team	1	2	3	4	5	6	7	8	9	10	11	12	13	14	15	16	17	18	Pos	Points
2019	Drivex School	LEC; 1; 15	LEC; 2; 19	PAU; 1; 11	PAU; 2 Ret	HOC; 1; 13	HOC; 2; 12	SPA; 1; 17	SPA; 2; 15	HUN; 1; 14	HUN; 2; 15	RBR; 1 Ret	RBR; 2; 12	SIL; 1; 11	SIL; 2; 12	CAT; 1; 13	CAT; 2; 15	MNZ; 1 Ret	MNZ; 2; 9	22nd	6
2020	CryptoTower Racing	HUN; 1; 11	HUN; 2; 12	LEC; 1; 8	LEC; 2; 9	RBR; 1; 9	RBR; 2; 10	MNZ; 1; 10	MNZ; 2; 6	MNZ; 3 Ret	MUG; 1; 13	MUG; 2; 12	SPA; 1; 11	SPA; 2; 8	SPA; 3; 10	CAT; 1; 9	CAT; 2; 12	CAT; 3; 9	CAT; 4; 10	14th	28

=== Complete Toyota Racing Series results ===
(key) (Races in bold indicate pole position) (Races in italics indicate fastest lap)

Year	Team	1	2	3	4	5	6	7	8	9	10	11	12	13	14	15	DC	Points
2020	M2 Competition	HIG; 1; 14	HIG; 2; 14	HIG; 3; 16	TER; 1; 15	TER; 2; 16	TER; 3; 14	HMP; 1; 13	HMP; 2; 13	HMP; 3 Ret	PUK; 1; 9	PUK; 2; 9	PUK; 3; 15	MAN; 1; 16	MAN; 2; 18	MAN; 3 Ret	16th	70

=== Complete Asian Le Mans Series results ===
(key) (Races in bold indicate pole position) (Races in italics indicate fastest lap)

Year	Team	Class	Car	Engine	1	2	3	4	5	Pos.	Points
2021	G-Drive Racing	LMP2	Aurus 01	Gibson GK428 4.2 L V8	DUB; 1; 4	DUB; 2; 2	ABU; 1; 3	ABU; 2; 2		3rd	66
2023–24	Dragon Racing	GT	Ferrari 296 GT3	Ferrari F163 3.0 L Turbo V6	SEP; 1	SEP; 2	DUB; 14	ABU; 1; 12	ABU; 2; 12	30th	0

=== Complete European Le Mans Series results ===
(key) (Races in bold indicate pole position; results in italics indicate fastest lap)

Year	Entrant	Class	Chassis	Engine	1	2	3	4	5	6	Rank	Points
2021	G-Drive Racing	LMP2	Aurus 01	Gibson GK428 4.2 L V8	CAT; 7	RBR; 3	LEC; 10	MNZ; 6	SPA; 7	ALG; 8	8th	42
2021	G-Drive Racing	Pro-Am Cup	Aurus 01	Gibson GK428 4.2 L V8	2	1	2	1	2	2	1st	122
2022	Duqueine Team	LMP2	Oreca 07	Gibson GK428 4.2 L V8	LEC	IMO	MNZ	CAT	SPA	ALG; 9	24th	2
2023	Inter Europol Competition	LMP2	Oreca 07	Gibson GK428 4.2 L V8	CAT; Ret	LEC; 3	ARA; Ret	SPA; Ret	POR; 6	ALG; 4	7th	33
2025	TF Sport	LMGT3	Chevrolet Corvette Z06 GT3.R	Chevrolet LT6.R 5.5 L V8	CAT; 6	LEC; Ret	IMO; 1	SPA; 8	SIL; 3	**ALG**; 1	1st	78
2026	Iron Lynx	LMGT3	Mercedes-AMG GT3 Evo	Mercedes-AMG M159 6.2 L V8	CAT; 7	LEC; 6	IMO; Ret	SPA; 8	SIL; Ret	ALG; Ret	20th	18

=== Complete FIA World Endurance Championship results ===
(key) (Races in bold indicate pole position; races in italics indicate fastest lap)

Year	Entrant	Class	Car	Engine	1	2	3	4	5	6	7	8	Rank	Points
2021	G-Drive Racing	LMP2	Aurus 01	Gibson GK428 4.2 L V8	SPA; 10	ALG	MNZ	LMS	BHR	BHR			NC†	0†
2022	RealTeam by WRT	LMP2	Oreca 07	Gibson GK428 4.2 L V8	SEB; 3	SPA; 2	LMS; 10	MNZ; 1	FUJ; 4	BHR; 5			4th	96
2023	Team WRT	LMP2	Oreca 07	Gibson GK428 4.2 L V8	SEB; 4	ALG; 3	SPA; 1	LMS; 2	**MNZ**; 3	FUJ; 1	BHR; 1		1st	173
2024	TF Sport	LMGT3	Chevrolet Corvette Z06 GT3.R	Chevrolet LT6.R 5.5 L V8	**QAT**; Ret	IMO; 7	SPA; Ret	LMS; 12	SÃO; 8	COA; Ret	FUJ; 4	BHR; 2	10th	50
2025	TF Sport	LMGT3	Chevrolet Corvette Z06 GT3.R	Chevrolet LT6.R 5.5 L V8	QAT; Ret	IMO; 6	SPA; 14	LMS; 3	SÃO; 2	COA; 13	FUJ; 1	BHR; 11	5th	81
2026	Iron Lynx	LMGT3	Mercedes-AMG GT3 Evo	Mercedes-AMG M159 6.2 L V8	IMO; Ret	SPA; 10	LMS; Ret	SÃO; 6	COA; 6	FUJ; Ret	CAT; 6	MNZ; 7	17th	31

^{†} As Andrade was a guest driver, he was ineligible for championship points.

=== Complete 24 Hours of Le Mans results ===
Year	Team	Co-Drivers	Car	Class	Laps	Pos.	Class Pos.
2021	G-Drive Racing	(Spain) Roberto Merhi (United States) John Falb	Aurus 01-Gibson	LMP2; Pro-Am	108	DNF	DNF
2022	(Switzerland) RealTeam by WRT	(Austria) Ferdinand Habsburg (France) Norman Nato	Oreca 07-Gibson	LMP2	362	21st	17th
2023	(Belgium) Team WRT	(Switzerland) Louis Delétraz (Poland) Robert Kubica	Oreca 07-Gibson	LMP2	328	10th	**2nd**
2024	(United Kingdom) TF Sport	(Republic of Ireland) Charlie Eastwood (Belgium) Tom van Rompuy	Chevrolet Corvette Z06 GT3.R	LMGT3	267	43rd	15th
2025	(United Kingdom) TF Sport	(Republic of Ireland) Charlie Eastwood (Belgium) Tom van Rompuy	Chevrolet Corvette Z06 GT3.R	LMGT3	341	35th	**3rd**
2026	(Italy) Iron Lynx	(Australia) Martin Berry (Belgium) Maxime Martin	Mercedes-AMG GT3 Evo	LMGT3	65	DNF	DNF

=== Complete IMSA SportsCar Championship results ===
(key) (Races in bold indicate pole position; results in italics indicate fastest lap)

Year	Team	Class	Make	Engine	1	2	3	4	5	6	7	8	9	10	Pos.	Points	Ref
2022	Tower Motorsport	LMP2	Oreca 07	Gibson GK428 4.2 L V8	DAY; 3†	SEB; 7	LGA	MDO	WGL; 2	ELK	PET; 1				12th	990	
2024	Lone Star Racing	GTD	Mercedes-AMG GT3 Evo	Mercedes-AMG M159 6.2 L V8	DAY; 8	SEB; 18	LBH	LGA	WGL; 20	MOS	ELK	VIR	IMS; 15	**PET**; 10	38th	945	

^{†} Points only counted towards the Michelin Endurance Cup, and not the overall LMP2 Championship.

Sporting positions
Preceded by António Félix da Costa; Will Stevens; Roberto González	FIA Endurance Trophy for LMP2 Drivers; 2023; With: Robert Kubica & Louis Delétraz	Succeeded by None (Class discontinued)
Preceded by Andrea Caldarelli; Axcil Jefferies; Hiroshi Hamaguchi	European Le Mans Series; LMGT3 Champion; 2025; With: Charlie Eastwood & Hiroshi Koizumi	Succeeded by Incumbent
