= Benjamin Goethe =

Danish-German racing driver (born 2003)

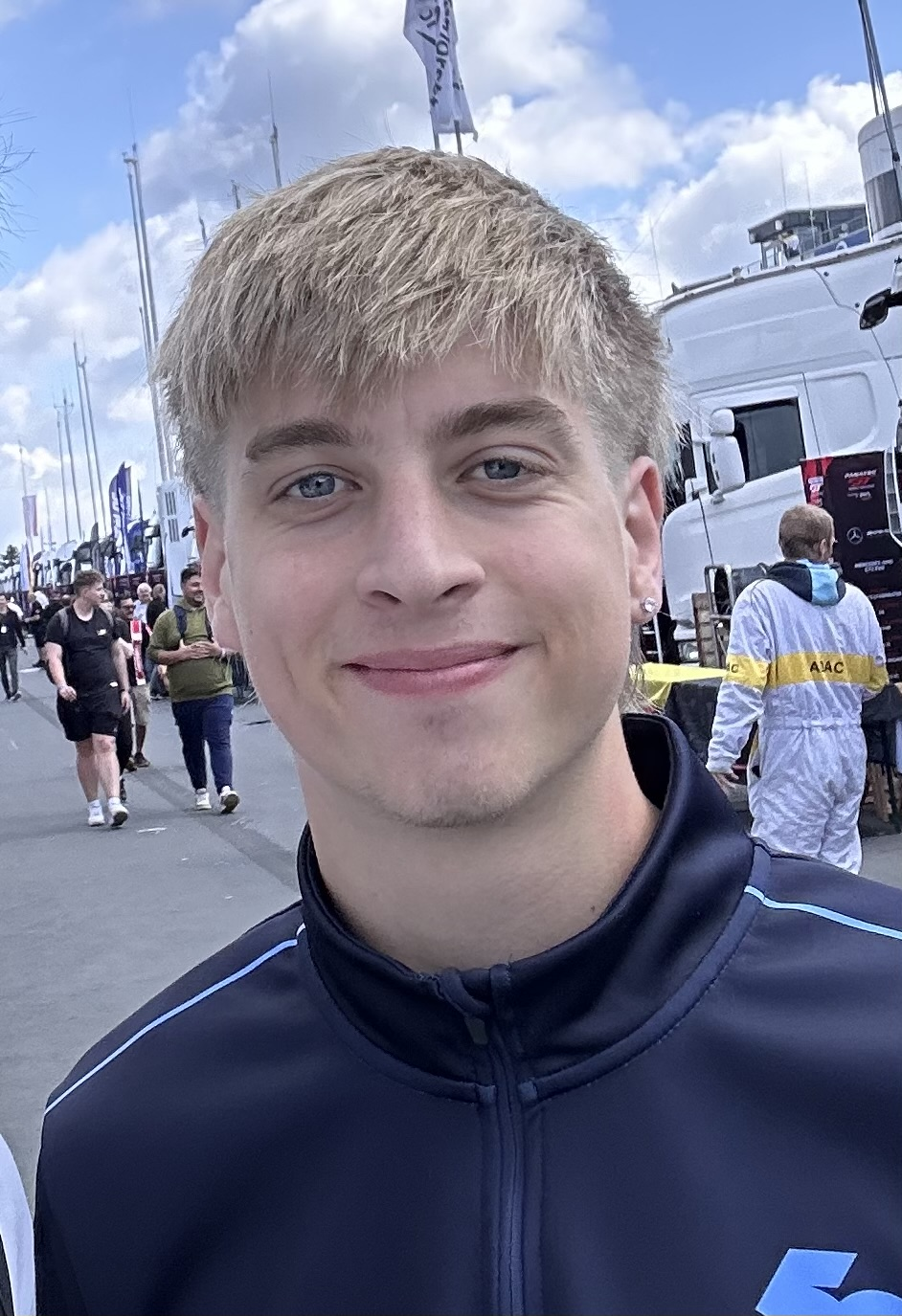
- Goethe in 2024
- Nationality: (Denmark) Danish (Germany) German (United Kingdom) British via triple nationality
- Born: 2 April 2003 (age 23) London, United Kingdom
- Relatives: Roald Goethe (father); Oliver Goethe (brother)

GT World Challenge Europe Endurance Cup career
- Debut season: 2019
- Current team: ROFGO Racing with Team WRT
- Categorisation: FIA Silver (until 2022); FIA Gold (2023–)
- Car number: 30
- Former teams: GPX Racing
- Starts: 17 (17 entries)
- Wins: 3
- Podiums: 5
- Poles: 2
- Fastest laps: 0
- Best finish: 1st (Silver Cup) in 2022

Previous series
- 2021 2020 2018: Le Mans Cup; ADAC GT Masters; F4 Spanish Championship

Championship titles
- 2022: GT World Challenge Europe Endurance Cup – Silver

Benjamin "Benji" Goethe (Note: Sometimes spelt Gøthe or Göthe.) (born 2 April 2003) is a British-born Danish-German racing driver. He won the Silver Cup category in the 2022 GT World Challenge Europe Endurance Cup.

== Early career ==
=== Karting ===
Having been introduced to motorsport at a young age, Goethe started his karting career in 2015. He first raced in various regional and national competitions in France, before competing in a select few international events in 2017, his final year of kart racing.

=== Formula 4 ===
Goethe made his single-seater debut in 2018, where he competed in the F4 Spanish Championship for Drivex School. The Dane experienced a challenging campaign, as he finished 13th in the standings with a highest race result of fifth at Jerez.

== Sportscar career ==
=== 2019 – GT debut ===
In 2019, Goethe switched to sportscar racing, driving with GPX Racing in four rounds of the Blancpain GT Series Endurance Cup alongside Jordan Grogor and his driver coach in karting and F4, Stuart Hall. The team ended up 20th in the Silver Cup, scoring 16 points, with Goethe becoming that year's recipient of the SRO Merit Award.

Goethe also took part in the 24 Hours of Barcelona as part of the 24H GT Series, where he took his first podium in car racing, finishing third.

=== 2020 – Move to WRT ===
Goethe returned to the newly rebranded GT World Challenge Europe Endurance Cup the following year, this time driving for ROFGO Racing with Team WRT, having become a member of the Bullet Sports Management roster. The campaign started out in disappointing fashion, as an eighth place in class at Imola was followed up by a retirement at the Hockenheimring. At the third round, the 24 Hours of Spa, which he contested as the youngest of 179 entrants, Goethe made an error in the closing stages, as he spun off in wet conditions, which forced his car to retire. The conclusion to his season proved to be more positive, as Goethe, along with teammates Stuart Hall and Rik Breukers, finished the race in fourth place in the Silver Cup, which elevated the squad to twelfth in the standings.

=== 2021 – Double campaign ===
For the 2021 season, Goethe remained with the team, but this time competed in both the Endurance Cup and the GT World Challenge Europe Sprint Cup.

Goethe would be paired up alongside James Pull and Stuart Hall for the former championship. Their season started out strongly at the opening round in Monza, where Goethe and his teammates finished sixth in the overall results, whilst taking a podium for the Silver Cup. Despite this ending up as the only podium of their campaign, the team took fifth in the Silver Cup, with an impressive charge up the field at the Barcelona season finale being a particular highlight of Goethe's season.

In the latter series, Goethe experienced a mixed campaign, scoring only two points finishes but taking one podium in Race 2 at Misano, which put him 21st overall. He summed up his season as having been "challenging", but also described it as a positive learning experience.

=== 2022 – Silver Cup title ===
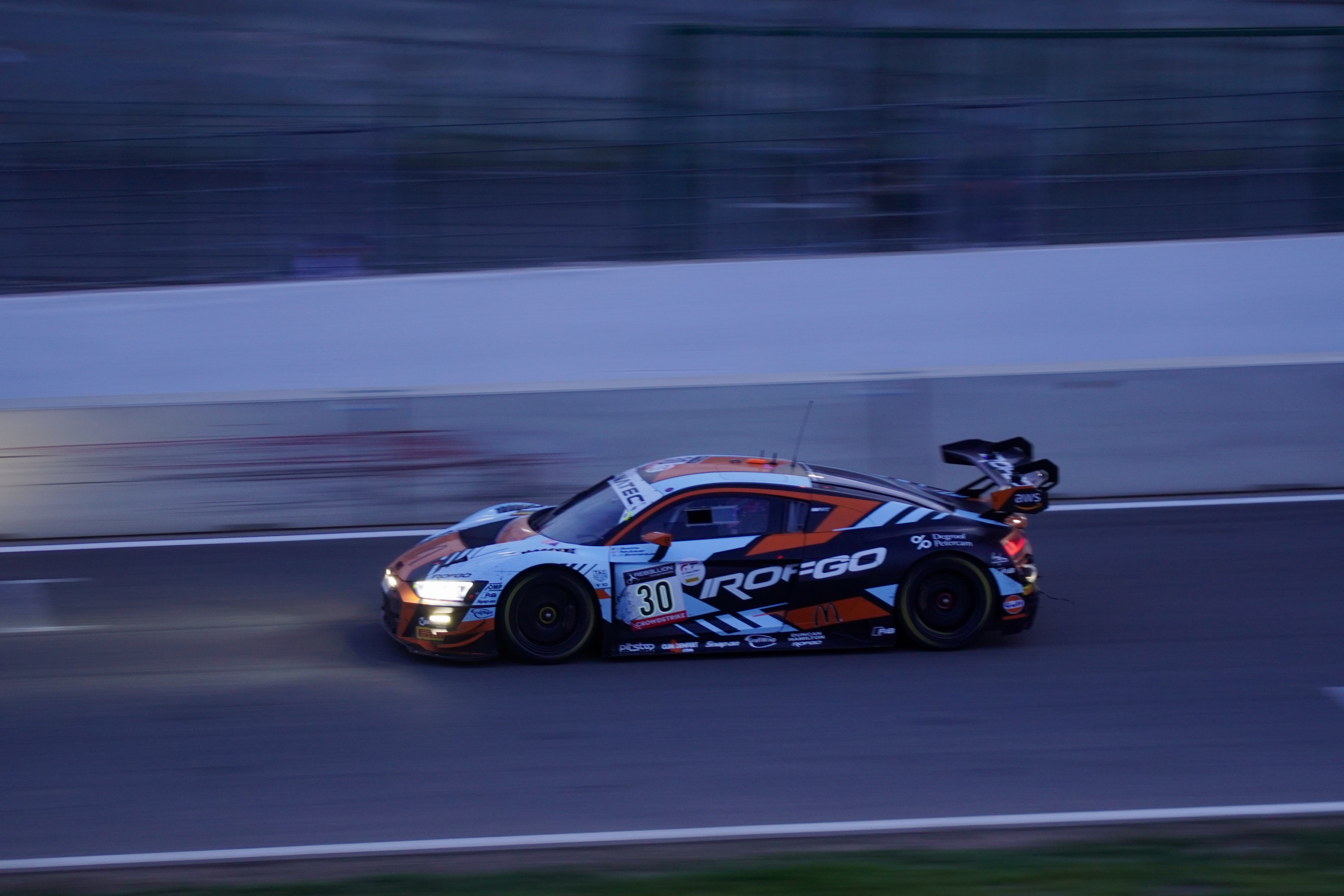
The #30 Audi R8 LMS from Team WRT at the 2022 24 Hours of Spa

Goethe started his 2022 season by finishing second in the Dubai 24 Hour race, before announcing that he would stay on in both the Endurance and Sprint Cup with ROFGO Racing with Team WRT, driving with Thomas Neubauer in the Sprint series, with the pair being partnered by Jean-Baptiste Simmenauer in the former championship.

The Sprint Cup series campaign began in torrid fashion, as a first-corner retirement caused by a rival car in the first race at Brands Hatch was followed by a meager 16th place in Race 2. A pair of points finishes in class at Magny-Cours came next, before Goethe and Neubauer scored a pair of podiums for the Silver Cup, as well as their first points for the main standings, during the next event in Circuit Zandvoort. The penultimate round, held at Misano, brought significant successes to the pairing, which finished third overall in Race 1, with Goethe holding off Audi factory driver Christopher Haase in the dying embers of the contest, after which they took another class podium on Sunday. Their campaign ended with a fourth place and class podium at Valencia, which meant that Goethe and Neubauer finished third in the Silver Cup and eleventh in the overall drivers' standings.

Goethe's season in the Endurance Cup would prove to bring even more success, starting out with a class win at Imola, where Goethe took his first ever victory in car racing, which he called "the perfect way to start". This was followed by a pole position in the Silver category at Le Castellet, but a spin from Goethe put the win out of reach for his team, which eventually finished fourth in class. What came next were the 24 Hours of Spa, where, having avoided any mistakes, Goethe, Simmenauer and Neubauer won in the Silver Cup, putting the outfit into the lead of the championship. At the Hockenheimring, Goethe and his teammates finished third in their class, enough to clinch the Silver Cup title with one remaining round. The team finished the season in style by winning in their category at Barcelona, leaving them with 125 points, 49 ahead of second place.

With those results, Goethe, along with Neubauer, was crowned as the overall GT World Challenge Europe Silver Cup champion.

=== 2023 – McLaren move ===
At the beginning of 2023, Goethe returned to take part in the Dubai 24 Hours, this time partnering brother Oliver, father Roald, Stuart Hall and Jordan Grogor in the GT4 category, with the team ending up as the winners within said class. During the same winter, he teamed up with Marvin Kirchhöfer and Alexander West at Garage 59 for the GT class of the Asian Le Mans Series. Goethe continued his relationship with Garage 59 for the remainder of the season, embarking on a full-season GT World Challenge Europe campaign in the Pro class. In the Sprint Cup, Goethe formed a pairing with Nicolai Kjærgaard, while Kirchhöfer completed the Endurance Cup trio. Both campaigns were discrete, as Goethe finished 13th in the Sprint Cup and 24th in the Endurance Cup standings.

=== 2024 ===
After retiring from the 2024 Dubai 24 Hours due to an electrical failure, Goethe returned to Garage 59 for full seasons in the Sprint and Endurance cups. In tandem with Tom Gamble in the Sprint Cup, Goethe finished in the top-ten in each of the ten races, finishing sixth in the standings after capping off the campaign with third place in Barcelona.

== Personal life ==
Goethe is part of a racing family. His father, Roald Goethe, is a gentleman driver who competed in the FIA World Endurance Championship and owns a collection of Gulf Oil race cars called ROFGO. His younger brother, Oliver, is currently racing in Formula 2.

Goethe was educated at the Millfield School, which is located in Somerset.

== Racing record ==
=== Racing career summary ===
Season	Series	Team	Races	Wins	Poles	F/Laps	Podiums	Points	Position
2018	F4 Spanish Championship	Drivex School	17	0	0	0	0	39	13th
2019	Blancpain GT Series Endurance Cup	GPX Racing	3	0	0	0	0	2	33rd
2019	Blancpain GT Series Endurance Cup - Silver	GPX Racing	3	0	0	0	0	16	20th
2019	Campeonato de España de Resistencia - GT	GPX Racing	5	4	2	5	5	208	**3rd**
2019	24H GT Series – European Championship - A6	GPX Racing	1	0	0	0	1	0	NC
2019	25 Hours VW Fun Cup	MAK Racing	1	0	0	0	0	N/A	41st
2020	GT World Challenge Europe Endurance Cup	ROFGO Racing with Team WRT	4	0	0	0	0	0	NC
2020	GT World Challenge Europe Endurance Cup - Silver	ROFGO Racing with Team WRT	4	0	0	0	0	31	12th
2020	Intercontinental GT Challenge	ROFGO Racing with Team WRT	1	0	0	0	0	0	NC
2020	ADAC GT Masters	Team WRT	4	0	1	0	0	0	NC†
2020	Campeonato de España de Resistencia - GT	GPX Racing	2	0	0	0	1	36	15th
2021	GT World Challenge Europe Endurance Cup - Silver	ROFGO Racing with Team WRT	5	0	0	0	1	61	5th
2021	GT World Challenge Sprint Cup	ROFGO Racing with Team WRT	10	0	0	0	1	10.5	21st
2021	Le Mans Cup - GT3	ROFGO Racing with Team WRT	2	0	0	0	0	0	NC†
2021	Intercontinental GT Challenge	Team WRT	1	0	0	0	0	0	NC
2021	24H GT Series - GT3 Pro	Team WRT	1	0	0	0	1	26	**2nd**
2022	GT World Challenge Europe Endurance Cup	ROFGO Racing with Team WRT	5	0	0	0	0	1	35th
2022	GT World Challenge Europe Endurance Cup - Silver	ROFGO Racing with Team WRT	5	3	2	0	4	125	**1st**
2022	GT World Challenge Sprint Cup	ROFGO Racing with Team WRT	10	0	0	0	1	18.5	11th
2022	GT World Challenge Sprint Cup - Silver	ROFGO Racing with Team WRT	10	1	0	3	5	82	**3rd**
2022	Intercontinental GT Challenge	Team WRT	1	0	0	0	0	2	18th
2022	24H GT Series Continents’ - GT3	Belgian Audi Club Team WRT	1	0	0	0	1	29	5th
2022–23	Middle East Trophy - GT4	ROFGO with Dragon Racing	1	1	0	0	1	0	NC†
2023	Asian Le Mans Series - GT	Garage 59	4	0	0	0	0	16	8th
2023	GT World Challenge Europe Endurance Cup	Garage 59	5	0	0	1	0	0	NC
2023	GT World Challenge Europe Sprint Cup	Garage 59	10	0	0	0	0	10	13th
2023–24	Middle East Trophy - GT3	ROFGO with Dragon Racing	1	0	0	0	0	0	NC†
2024	GT World Challenge Europe Endurance Cup	Garage 59	5	0	0	0	0	2	30th
2024	GT World Challenge Europe Sprint Cup	Garage 59	10	0	0	0	1	36.5	6th
2024	British GT Championship - GT3	Orange Racing powered by JMH	1	0	0	0	0	0	NC†
2024–25	Asian Le Mans Series - GT	Optimum Motorsport	6	0	0	0	0	12	17th
2025	Middle East Trophy - GT3	Optimum Motorsport	1	0	0	0	0	0	NC†
2025	FIA GT World Cup	Optimum Motorsport	1	0	0	0	0	N/A	10th
2025	GT World Challenge Europe Endurance Cup	Garage 59	5	0	1	0	1	39	7th
2025	GT World Challenge Europe Sprint Cup	Garage 59	10	2	2	0	4	80	**3rd**
2025	International GT Open	Garage 59	1	0	0	0	0	0	NC†
2025–26	24H Series Middle East - GT3	Optimum Motorsport	1	0	0	0	0	0	NC†
2026	FIA World Endurance Championship - LMGT3	Garage 59	8	0	0	0	0	22	19th
2026	GT World Challenge Europe Endurance Cup	Garage 59	5	0	0	0	1	32	7th
2026	IMSA SportsCar Championship - GTD Pro	RLL Team McLaren	1	0	0	0	0	192	44th
2026	FIA GT World Cup	Optimum Motorsport							

^{†} As Goethe was a guest driver, he was ineligible to score points.
* Season still in progress.

=== Complete F4 Spanish Championship results ===
(key) (Races in bold indicate pole position) (Races in italics indicate fastest lap)

Year	Team	1	2	3	4	5	6	7	8	9	10	11	12	13	14	15	16	17	18	DC	Points
2018	Drivex School	ARA; 1 Ret	ARA; 2; 8	ARA; 3 Ret	CRT; 1; 7	CRT; 2; 10	CRT; 3; 8	ALG; 1; 11	ALG; 2 Ret	ALG; 3 Ret	CAT; 1 C	CAT; 2; 6	JER; 1; 7	JER; 2; 5	JER; 3; 11	NAV; 1; 9	NAV; 2 Ret	NAV; 3; 7	NAV; 4; 9	13th	39

=== Complete GT World Challenge results ===
==== GT World Challenge Europe Endurance Cup ====
(Races in bold indicate pole position) (Races in italics indicate fastest lap)

Year	Team	Car	Class	1	2	3	4	5	6	7	Pos.	Points
2019	GPX Racing	Porsche 911 GT3 R	Silver	MNZ; DNS	SIL; 28	LEC; 21	SPA; 6H	SPA; 12H	SPA; 24H	CAT; 9	20th	16
2020	ROFGO Racing with Team WRT	Audi R8 LMS Evo	Silver	IMO; 32	NÜR; Ret	SPA; 6H; 34	SPA; 12H; 35	SPA; 24H; 34†	LEC; 19		12th	31
2021	ROFGO Racing with Team WRT	Audi R8 LMS Evo	Silver	MNZ; 6	LEC; 19	SPA; 6H; 47	SPA; 12H; 25	SPA; 24H; 22	NÜR; 13	CAT; 18	5th	61
2022	ROFGO Racing with Team WRT	Audi R8 LMS Evo II	Silver	IMO; 14	**LEC**; 15	SPA; 6H; 15	SPA; 12H; 19	SPA; 24H; 13	**HOC**; 10	CAT; 11	1st	125
2023	Garage 59	McLaren 720S GT3 Evo	Pro	MNZ; 19	LEC; 12	SPA; 6H; 10	SPA; 12H; 59†	SPA; 24H; Ret	NÜR; 13	CAT; 8	24th	4
2024	Garage 59	McLaren 720S GT3 Evo	Pro	LEC; Ret	SPA; 6H; 35	SPA; 12H; 29	SPA; 24H; 11	NÜR; 14	MNZ; 14	JED; 9	30th	2
2025	Garage 59	McLaren 720S GT3 Evo	Pro	LEC; Ret	MNZ; 2	SPA; 6H; 22	SPA; 12H; 4	**SPA**; **24H**; 6	NÜR; 8	CAT; Ret	7th	39
2026	Garage 59	McLaren 720S GT3 Evo	Gold	**LEC**; 3	MNZ; 18	SPA; 6H; 4	SPA; 12H; 3	**SPA**; **24H**; 36	**NÜR**; Ret	ALG; DSQ	3rd	86

^{*}Season still in progress.

==== GT World Challenge Europe Sprint Cup ====
(key) (Races in bold indicate pole position) (Races in italics indicate fastest lap)

Year	Team	Car	Class	1	2	3	4	5	6	7	8	9	10	Pos.	Points
2021	ROFGO Racing with Team WRT	Audi R8 LMS Evo	Pro	MAG; 1; 11	MAG; 2 Ret	ZAN; 1; 16	ZAN; 2; 18	MIS; 1; 23	MIS; 2; 3	BRH; 1; 18	BRH; 2; 9	VAL; 1; 18	VAL; 2; 13	21st	10.5
2022	ROFGO Racing with Team WRT	Audi R8 LMS Evo II	Silver	BRH; 1 Ret	BRH; 2; 16	MAG; 1; 11	MAG; 2; 13	ZAN; 1; 10	ZAN; 2; 10	**MIS**; **1**; 3	MIS; 2; 10	VAL; 1; 4	VAL; 2; 15	3rd	82
2023	Garage 59	McLaren 720S GT3 Evo	Pro	BRH; 1; 16	BRH; 2; 4	MIS; 1 Ret	MIS; 2; 10	HOC; 1 Ret	HOC; 2; 34†	VAL; 1; 9	VAL; 2; 15	ZAN; 1; 18	ZAN; 2; 9	13th	10
2024	Garage 59	McLaren 720S GT3 Evo	Pro	BRH; 1; 5	BRH; 2; 6	MIS; 1; 8	MIS; 2; 6	HOC; 1; 9	HOC; 2; 9	MAG; 1; 9	MAG; 2; 5	CAT; 1; 8	CAT; 2; 3	6th	36.5
2025	Garage 59	McLaren 720S GT3 Evo	Pro	BRH; 1; 2	BRH; 2; 6	ZAN; 1; 6	ZAN; 2; 4	MIS; 1; 5	**MIS**; **2**; 1	MAG; 1; 9	**MAG**; **2**; 1	VAL; 1 Ret	VAL; 2; 3	3rd	80

^{*} Season still in progress.

=== Complete 24 Hours of Spa results ===
Year	Team	Co-Drivers	Car	Class	Laps	Pos.	Class Pos.
2020	(United Kingdom) ROFGO Racing with Team WRT	(Netherlands) Rik Breukers (United Kingdom) Stuart Hall	Audi R8 LMS GT3	Silver Cup	453	34th†	7th†
2021	(United Kingdom) ROFGO Racing with Team WRT	(Argentina) Franco Colapinto (United Kingdom) James Pull	Audi R8 LMS Evo	Silver Cup	546	22nd	6th
2022	(United Kingdom) ROFGO Racing with Team WRT	(France) Thomas Neubauer (France) Jean-Baptiste Simmenauer	Audi R8 LMS Evo II	Silver Cup	533	13th	**1st**
2023	(United Kingdom) Garage 59	(Germany) Marvin Kirchhöfer (Denmark) Nicolai Kjærgaard	McLaren 720S GT3 Evo	Pro	208	DNF	DNF
2024	(United Kingdom) Garage 59	(United Kingdom) Tom Gamble (United Kingdom) Dean MacDonald	McLaren 720S GT3 Evo	Pro	477	11th	9th
2025	(United Kingdom) Garage 59	(Germany) Marvin Kirchhöfer (United Kingdom) Joseph Loake	McLaren 720S GT3 Evo	Pro	549	6th	6th

=== Complete Intercontinental GT Challenge results ===
Year	Manufacturer	Car	1	2	3	4	Pos.	Points
2020	Audi Sport	R8 LMS GT3	BAT	IND	SPA; 34†	KYA	NC	0
2021	Audi Sport	R8 LMS Evo	SPA; 22	IND	KYA		NC	0
2022	Audi Sport	R8 LMS Evo II	BAT	SPA; 13	IND	GUL	21st	2

=== Complete Dubai 24 Hour results ===
Year	Team	Co-Drivers	Car	Class	Laps	Pos.	Class Pos.
2021	(Belgium) Team WRT	(United Kingdom) Frank Bird (Belgium) Louis Machiels (South Africa) Kelvin van der Linde (Belgium) Dries Vanthoor	Audi R8 LMS Evo	GT3-Pro	599	**2nd**	**2nd**
2022	(Belgium) Belgian Audi Club Team WRT	(France) Arnold Robin (France) Maxime Robin (France) Jean-Baptiste Simmenauer (Belgium) Frédéric Vervisch	Audi R8 LMS Evo	GT3-Pro	595	**2nd**	**2nd**
2023	(United Arab Emirates) ROFGO with Dragon Racing	(Germany) Oliver Goethe (Germany) Roald Goethe (United Arab Emirates) Jordan Grogor (United Kingdom) Stuart Hall	Mercedes-AMG GT4	GT4	566	23rd	**1st**
2024	(United Kingdom) ROFGO with Dragon Racing	(Denmark) Oliver Goethe (Germany) Roald Goethe (South Africa) Jordan Grogor (United Kingdom) Stuart Hall	Ferrari 296 GT3	GT3-Pro	160	DNF	DNF
2025	(United Kingdom) ROFGO with Dragon Racing	(United Kingdom) Tom Ikin (United Kingdom) Mikey Porter (United Kingdom) Morgan Tillbrook	McLaren 720S GT3 Evo	GT3-Pro	292	11th	6th

=== Complete Asian Le Mans Series results ===
(key) (Races in bold indicate pole position) (Races in italics indicate fastest lap)

Year	Team	Class	Car	Engine	1	2	3	4	5	6	Pos.	Points
2023	Garage 59	GT	McLaren 720S GT3	McLaren M840T 4.0 L Turbo V8	DUB; 1; 15	DUB; 2; 4	ABU; 1 Ret	ABU; 2; 8			8th	16
2024–25	Garage 59	GT	McLaren 720S GT3	McLaren M840T 4.0 L Turbo V8	SEP; 1; 14	SEP; 2; 23	DUB; 1; 13	DUB; 2 Ret	ABU; 1 Ret	ABU; 2; 4	17th	12

=== Complete FIA World Endurance Championship results ===
(key) (Races in bold indicate pole position; races in italics indicate fastest lap)

Year	Entrant	Class	Chassis	Engine	1	2	3	4	5	6	7	8	Rank	Points
2026	Garage 59	LMGT3	McLaren 720S GT3 Evo	McLaren M840T 4.0 L Turbo V8	IMO; 7	SPA; 5	LMS; 10	SÃO; 11	COA; 8	FUJ; Ret	CAT; 11	MNZ; Ret	19th	22

=== Complete 24 Hours of Le Mans results ===
Year	Team	Co-Drivers	Car	Class	Laps	Pos.	Class Pos.
2026	(United Kingdom) Garage 59	(Germany) Finn Gehrsitz (Sweden) Alexander West	McLaren 720S GT3 Evo	LMGT3	329	47th	15th

=== Complete IMSA SportsCar Championship results ===
(key) (Races in bold indicate pole position; races in italics indicate fastest lap)

Year	Entrant	Class	Chassis	Engine	1	2	3	4	5	6	7	8	9	10	Rank	Points
2026	RLL Team McLaren	GTD Pro	McLaren 720S GT3 Evo	McLaren M840T 4.0 L Turbo V8	DAY	SEB	LGA	DET	WGL	MOS	ELK	VIR	IMS	PET; 14	44th	192
