= 2018 Campeonato de España de Resistencia =

The 2018 Trofeo de España TCR is the third season of the TCR Spanish Series. The championship will run as the one of classes of the Campeonato de España de Resistencia.

== Teams and drivers ==
Team	Car	No.	Drivers	Rounds
(Spain) SMC Junior Motorsport	Peugeot 308 Racing Cup	2	(Spain) Gonzalo de Andrés	1, 4–5
(Spain) SMC Junior Motorsport	Peugeot 308 Racing Cup	2	(Spain) Enrique Hernando	All
(Spain) PCR Sport	CUPRA León TCR DSG	3	(Spain) Harriet Arruaberrena	All
(Spain) PCR Sport	CUPRA León TCR DSG	3	(Spain) Antonio Aristi	All
(Spain) PCR Sport	CUPRA León TCR DSG	6	(Spain) Vicente Dasi	All
(Spain) PCR Sport	CUPRA León TCR DSG	6	(Spain) Josep Parera	All
(Spain) PCR Sport	CUPRA León TCR DSG	8	(Spain) Fernando Monje	All
(Spain) PCR Sport	CUPRA León TCR DSG	8	(Spain) Ferrán Monje	All
(Spain) PCR Sport	CUPRA León TCR DSG	20	(Spain) Unai Arruabarrena	All
(Spain) PCR Sport	CUPRA León TCR DSG	20	(Spain) Óscar Fernández	1–2, 4
(Spain) PCR Sport	CUPRA León TCR DSG	20	(Spain) Miquel Socias	3
(Spain) PCR Sport	CUPRA León TCR DSG	20	(Spain) Jordi Masdeu	5
(Spain) PCR Sport	CUPRA León TCR DSG	34	(Spain) Guillermo Aso	All
(Spain) Baporo Motorsport	Audi RS 3 LMS TCR DSG	5	(Italy) Alberto Vescovi	1–3, 5
(Spain) Baporo Motorsport	Audi RS 3 LMS TCR DSG	5	(Italy) Roberto Ferri	1–3, 5
(Spain) Baporo Motorsport	CUPRA León TCR SEQ	38	(Argentina) José Manuel Sapag	2
(Spain) Baporo Motorsport	CUPRA León TCR DSG	63	(Russia) Zakhar Makushin	1
(Spain) Baporo Motorsport	CUPRA León TCR DSG	63	(Russia) Evgeniy Makushin	1
(Spain) Baporo Motorsport	CUPRA León TCR DSG	93	(Andorra) Joan Vinyes	All
(Spain) Baporo Motorsport	CUPRA León TCR DSG	93	(Spain) Jaime Font	All
(Spain) Monlau Competicion	CUPRA León TCR DSG	7	(Italy) Gianluigi Vicinanza	All
(Spain) Monlau Competicion	CUPRA León TCR DSG	7	(Spain) Álex Cosin	All
(Spain) Monlau Competicion	CUPRA León TCR SEQ	15	(Spain) Alba Cano	1–4
(Spain) Monlau Competicion	CUPRA León TCR SEQ	15	(Spain) Álvaro Huertas	1–3
(Spain) NM Racing Team	CUPRA León TCR DSG	9	(Spain) Lluc Ibáñez	All
(Spain) NM Racing Team	CUPRA León TCR DSG	9	(Spain) Maxime Guillemat	All
(Portugal) Veloso Motorsport	SEAT León TCR	13	(Portugal) Edgar Florindo	1–2
(Spain) RC2 Junior Team	CUPRA León TCR DSG	17	(Spain) Raúl Martínez	All
(Spain) RC2 Junior Team	CUPRA León TCR DSG	17	(Spain) Rubén Martínez	All
(Spain) RC2 Junior Team	SEAT León TCR	32	(Spain) Max Llobet	All
(Spain) RC2 Junior Team	SEAT León TCR	32	(Spain) David Cebrián	All
(Spain) Motor Club Sabadell	SEAT León TCR	26	(Spain) Mauro Rial	1
(Spain) Real Automóvil Club Circuito Guadalope	CUPRA León TCR DSG	37	(Spain) Jaime Carbó	All
(Spain) Real Automóvil Club Circuito Guadalope	CUPRA León TCR DSG	37	(Spain) José Manuel de los Milagros	All
(Spain) Real Automóvil Club Circuito Guadalope	CUPRA León TCR DSG	37	(Spain) Jacobo Carbó	5

== Calendar and results ==
Rnd.	Circuit	Date	Pole position	Fastest lap	Winning driver	Winning team	Supporting
1	(Valencian Community) Circuit Ricardo Tormo, Cheste	15 April	(Spain) David Cebrián (Spain) Max Llobet	(Portugal) Edgar Florindo	(Spain) David Cebrián (Spain) Max Llobet	(Spain) RC2 Junior Team	
2	(Aragon) Ciudad del Motor de Aragón, Alcañiz	20 May	(Spain) Jaime Carbo (Spain) José Manuel de los Milagros	(Spain) Fernando Monje (Spain) Ferran Monje	(Spain) Jaime Carbo (Spain) José Manuel de los Milagros	(Spain) Real Automóvil Club Circuito Guadalope	F4 Spanish Championship
2	(Aragon) Ciudad del Motor de Aragón, Alcañiz	20 May	(Argentina) José Manuel Sapag	(Spain) Fernando Monje (Spain) Ferran Monje	(Argentina) José Manuel Sapag	(Spain) Baporo Motorsport	F4 Spanish Championship
3	(Navarre) Circuito de Navarra, Los Arcos	10 June	(Spain) Fernando Monje (Spain) Ferran Monje	(Spain) Fernando Monje (Spain) Ferran Monje	(Spain) David Cebrián (Spain) Max Llobet	(Spain) RC2 Junior Team	
3	(Navarre) Circuito de Navarra, Los Arcos	10 June	(Italy) Gianluigi Vicinanza (Spain) Alex Cosin	(Italy) Gianluigi Vicinanza (Spain) Alex Cosin	(Spain) Lluc Ibanez (Spain) Maxime Guillemat	(Spain) NM Racing Team	
4	(Community of Madrid) Circuito del Jarama, Madrid	7 October	(Andorra) Joan Vinyes (Spain) Jaime Font	(Spain) Fernando Monje (Spain) Ferran Monje	(Spain) Gonzalo de Andres (Spain) Enrique Hernando	(Spain) SMC Junior Motorsport	
5	(Catalonia) Circuit de Barcelona-Catalunya, Montmeló	11 November	(Italy) Gianluigi Vicinanza (Spain) Alex Cosin	(Spain) Fernando Monje (Spain) Ferran Monje	(Spain) Lluc Ibanez (Spain) Maxime Guillemat	(Spain) NM Racing Team	

== Championship standings ==
=== Scoring system ===
Position	1st	2nd	3rd	4th	5th	6th	7th	8th	9th	10th	11th	12th	13th	14th	15th	16th	17th	18th	19th	20th
Endurance races	52	48	44	36	32	28	24	20	18	16	14	12	10	8	6	5	4	3	2	1
Sprint races	40	36	32	24	20	16	14	10	8	6	5	4	3	2	1					

=== Drivers' championship ===
Pos.	Driver	VAL	ALC		NAV		JAR		BAR	Pts.
1	(Spain) David Cebrián (Spain) Max Llobet	**1**	7	12	1	4	8	2	4	209
2	(Italy) Gianluigi Vicinanza (Spain) Álex Cosin	2	8	Ret	4	**2**	6	5	**2**	197
3	(Andorra) Joan Vinyes (Spain) Jaime Font	3	5	2	7	Ret	**2**	3	9	190
4	(Spain) Lluc Ibáñez (Spain) Maxime Guillemat	5	4	Ret	5	1	10	Ret	1	162
5	(Spain) Enrique Hernando	12	12	8	6	9	1	**1**	6	156
6	(Spain) Fernando Monje (Spain) Ferrán Monje	Ret	2	10	**2**	5	3	7	7	150
7	(Spain) Raúl Martínez (Spain) Rubén Martínez	7	10	4	10	6	5	4	8	137
8	(Spain) Gonzalo de Andrés	12					1	**1**	6	120
9	(Spain) Guillermo Aso	4	Ret	9	3	Ret	DNS	Ret	3	120
10	(Spain) Harriet Arruabarrena (Spain) Antonio Aristi	8	6	7	9	3	9	8	10	116
11	(Italy) Alberto Vescovi (Italy) Roberto Ferri	10	13	5	12	7			5	87,5
12	(Spain) Jaime Carbó (Spain) José Manuel de los Milagros	11	**1**	6	Ret	11	DNS	6	11	85
13	(Spain) Alba Cano	14	9	3	8	Ret	4	Ret		78
14	(Argentina) José Manuel Sapag		3	**1**						56
15	(Spain) Álvaro Huertas	14	9	3	8	Ret				54
16	(Spain) Vicente Dasi (Spain) Josep Parera	Ret	11	11	11	8	7	Ret	12	48,5
17	(Spain) Unai Arruabarrena	9	14	13	Ret	10	DNS	9	13	46
18	(Spain) Óscar Fernández	9	14	13			DNS	9		30
19	(Portugal) Edgar Florindo	6	Ret	Ret						28
20	(Spain) Jacobo Carbó								11	14
21	(Spain) Mauro Rial	13								10
22	(Spain) Jordi Masdeu								13	10
23	(Spain) Miquel Socias				Ret	10				6
24	(Russia) Zakhar Makushin (Russia) Evgeniy Makushin	15								6
Pos.	Driver	VAL	ALC		NAV		JAR		BAR	Pts.

Colour	Result
Gold	Winner
Silver	Second place
Bronze	Third place
Green	Points classification
Blue	Non-points classification
Blue	Non-classified finish (NC)
Purple	Retired, not classified (Ret)
Red	Did not qualify (DNQ)
Red	Did not pre-qualify (DNPQ)
Black	Disqualified (DSQ)
White	Did not start (DNS)
White	Withdrew (WD)
White	Race cancelled (C)
Blank	Did not practice (DNP)
Blank	Did not arrive (DNA)
Blank	Excluded (EX)

**Bold** – Pole
Italics – Fastest Lap

† – Drivers did not finish the race, but were classified as they completed over 75% of the race distance.
