= 2018 F4 Spanish Championship =

3rd season of the Spanish F4 Championship

The 2018 F4 Spanish Championship was the third season of the Spanish F4 Championship. It was a multi-event motor racing championship for open wheel, formula racing cars regulated according to FIA Formula 4 regulations, taking place in Spain. The championship featured drivers competing in 1.4 litre Tatuus-Abarth single seat race cars that conformed to the technical regulations for the championship. The series was organised by RFEDA.

== Entry list ==
Team	No.	Driver	Class	Rounds
(Spain) Drivex School	8	(Mexico) Javier González		2–6
(Spain) Drivex School	17	(Malaysia) Nazim Azman		1
(Spain) Drivex School	21	(Portugal) Rui Andrade (Note: Andrade is an Angolan driver competing under a Portuguese licence.)	R	2–6
(Spain) Drivex School	26	(Spain) Rafael Villanueva Jr.	R	1–4
(Spain) Drivex School	30	(Poland) Filip Kaminiarz	R	2–6
(Spain) Drivex School	43	(Argentina) Franco Colapinto		6
(Spain) Drivex School	96	(Denmark) Benjamin Goethe	R	All
(Spain) Fórmula de Campeones - Praga F4	9	(Czech Republic) Petr Ptáček	R	1–3
(Spain) Fórmula de Campeones - Praga F4	10	(Spain) Kilian Meyer	R	4–6
(Spain) Fórmula de Campeones - Praga F4	26	(Spain) Rafael Villanueva Jr.	R	5–6
(Netherlands) MP Motorsport	12	(Switzerland) Patrick Schott	R	All
(Netherlands) MP Motorsport	17	(Malaysia) Nazim Azman		2–6
(Netherlands) MP Motorsport	52	(Hungary) László Tóth	R	2–6
(Netherlands) MP Motorsport	64	(Sweden) Isac Blomqvist	R	1
(Netherlands) MP Motorsport	888	(Belgium) Amaury Cordeel	R	All
(Spain) FA Racing	18	(Spain) Guillem Pujeu		All
(Spain) NMRT Global Racing Service	72	(Spain) Xavier Lloveras		6

Icon	Legend
R	Rookie

== Race calendar ==
The provisional calendar was announced on 23 November 2017. An updated version of the calendar was released on 23 January 2018, with changes applied to Jerez round date.

On 1 June, it was announced the organizers cancelled round 2 at the Circuito del Jarama in Madrid due to lack of entries.

Round		Circuit	Date	Pole position	Fastest lap	Winning driver	Winning team	Supporting
1	R1	(Spain) Ciudad del Motor de Aragón, Alcañiz	19 May	(Sweden) Isac Blomqvist	(Sweden) Isac Blomqvist	(Spain) Guillem Pujeu	(Spain) FA Racing	GT-CER
1	R2	(Spain) Ciudad del Motor de Aragón, Alcañiz	20 May	(Sweden) Isac Blomqvist	(Spain) Guillem Pujeu	(Spain) Guillem Pujeu	(Spain) FA Racing	GT-CER
1	R3	(Spain) Ciudad del Motor de Aragón, Alcañiz	20 May	(Belgium) Amaury Cordeel	(Spain) Guillem Pujeu	(Spain) Guillem Pujeu	(Spain) FA Racing	GT-CER
2	R1	(Spain) Circuit Ricardo Tormo, Cheste	23 June	(Belgium) Amaury Cordeel	(Belgium) Amaury Cordeel	(Mexico) Javier González	(Spain) Drivex School	Clio Cup Spain
2	R2	(Spain) Circuit Ricardo Tormo, Cheste	24 June	(Czech Republic) Petr Ptáček	(Belgium) Amaury Cordeel	(Mexico) Javier González	(Spain) Drivex School	Clio Cup Spain
2	R3	(Spain) Circuit Ricardo Tormo, Cheste	24 June	(Czech Republic) Petr Ptáček	(Czech Republic) Petr Ptáček	(Czech Republic) Petr Ptáček	(Spain) Fórmula de Campeones - Praga F4	Clio Cup Spain
3	R1	(Portugal) Autódromo Internacional do Algarve, Portimão	6 July	(Mexico) Javier González	(Belgium) Amaury Cordeel	(Belgium) Amaury Cordeel	(Netherlands) MP Motorsport	24H Series
3	R2	(Portugal) Autódromo Internacional do Algarve, Portimão	8 July	(Mexico) Javier González	(Belgium) Amaury Cordeel	(Mexico) Javier González	(Spain) Drivex School	24H Series
3	R3	(Portugal) Autódromo Internacional do Algarve, Portimão	8 July	(Mexico) Javier González	(Belgium) Amaury Cordeel	(Mexico) Javier González	(Spain) Drivex School	24H Series
4	R1	(Spain) Circuit de Barcelona-Catalunya	7 September	Race cancelled due to weather conditions				24H Series
4	R2	(Spain) Circuit de Barcelona-Catalunya	8 September	(Belgium) Amaury Cordeel	(Belgium) Amaury Cordeel	(Mexico) Javier González	(Spain) Drivex School	24H Series
5	R1	(Spain) Circuito de Jerez, Jerez de la Frontera	22 September	(Spain) Guillem Pujeu	(Spain) Guillem Pujeu	(Spain) Guillem Pujeu	(Spain) FA Racing	La leyenda
5	R2	(Spain) Circuito de Jerez, Jerez de la Frontera	23 September	(Belgium) Amaury Cordeel	(Spain) Guillem Pujeu	(Spain) Guillem Pujeu	(Spain) FA Racing	La leyenda
5	R3	(Spain) Circuito de Jerez, Jerez de la Frontera	23 September	(Belgium) Amaury Cordeel	(Belgium) Amaury Cordeel	(Belgium) Amaury Cordeel	(Netherlands) MP Motorsport	La leyenda
6	R1	(Spain) Circuito de Navarra, Los Arcos	3 November	(Spain) Xavier Lloveras	(Belgium) Amaury Cordeel	(Spain) Guillem Pujeu	(Spain) FA Racing	
6	R2	(Spain) Circuito de Navarra, Los Arcos	3 November	(Belgium) Amaury Cordeel	(Spain) Guillem Pujeu	(Belgium) Amaury Cordeel	(Netherlands) MP Motorsport	
6	R3	(Spain) Circuito de Navarra, Los Arcos	4 November	(Mexico) Javier González	(Belgium) Amaury Cordeel	(Mexico) Javier González	(Spain) Drivex School	
6	R4	(Spain) Circuito de Navarra, Los Arcos	4 November	(Mexico) Javier González	(Spain) Xavier Lloveras	(Argentina) Franco Colapinto	(Spain) Drivex School	

== Championship standings ==
Points were awarded to the top ten classified finishers in races 1 and 3 and for the top eight classified finishers in race 2. No points were awarded for pole position or fastest lap.

Races	Position, points per race									
Races	**1st**	**2nd**	**3rd**	**4th**	**5th**	**6th**	**7th**	**8th**	**9th**	**10th**
Races 1 & 3	25	18	15	12	10	8	6	4	2	1
Race 2	15	12	10	8	6	4	2	1		

=== Drivers' championship ===
Pos	Driver	ARA (Spain)			CRT (Spain)			ALG (Portugal)			CAT (Spain)		JER (Spain)			NAV (Spain)				Pts
1	(Belgium) Amaury Cordeel **R**	DSQ	3	**6**	**3**	11†	3	1	2	3	C	**2**	2	**2**	**1**	2	**1**	11	7	208
2	(Spain) Guillem Pujeu	1	1	1	6	4	Ret	4	Ret	4	C	Ret	**1**	1	2	1	4	Ret	6	200
3	(Mexico) Javier González				1	1	2	**5**	**1**	**1**	C	1	4	Ret	7	4	3	**1**	5	196
4	(Malaysia) Nazim Azman	3	4	3	2	3	4	3	4	2	C	3	6	10	5	8	6	3	4	179
5	(Switzerland) Patrick Schott **R**	4	7	4	4	9	5	6	5	Ret	C	7	5	3	6	3	11	9	3	119
6	(Spain) Rafael Villanueva Jr. **R**	5	6	5	8	5	6	7	7	5	C	9	9	6	4	11	7	6	8	90
7	(Czech Republic) Petr Ptáček **R**	6	5	7	Ret	**2**	**1**	2	3	Ret										79
8	(Spain) Kilian Meyer **R**										C	4	3	4	3	7	10	4	11	62
9	(Argentina) Franco Colapinto															5	5	2	1	49
10	(Sweden) Isac Blomqvist **R**	**2**	**2**	2																48
11	(Hungary) László Tóth **R**				5	6	7	8	6	7	C	8	10	9	8	12	9	8	12	47
12	(Portugal) Rui Andrade **R**				9	8	9	10	8	6	C	5	8	8	9	13	8	5	10	43
13	(Denmark) Benjamin Goethe **R**	Ret	8	Ret	7	10	8	11	Ret	Ret	C	6	7	5	11	9	Ret	7	9	39
14	(Spain) Xavier Lloveras															**6**	2	Ret	2	20
15	(Poland) Filip Kaminiarz				10	7	Ret	9	Ret	8	C	Ret	Ret	7	10	10	Ret	10	13	14
Pos	Driver	ARA (Spain)			CRT (Spain)			ALG (Portugal)			CAT (Spain)		JER (Spain)			NAV (Spain)				Pts

Colour	Result
Gold	Winner
Silver	Second place
Bronze	Third place
Green	Points classification
Blue	Non-points classification
Blue	Non-classified finish (NC)
Purple	Retired, not classified (Ret)
Red	Did not qualify (DNQ)
Red	Did not pre-qualify (DNPQ)
Black	Disqualified (DSQ)
White	Did not start (DNS)
White	Withdrew (WD)
White	Race cancelled (C)
Blank	Did not practice (DNP)
Blank	Did not arrive (DNA)
Blank	Excluded (EX)

**Bold** – Pole
Italics – Fastest Lap

Notes:

- † — Drivers did not finish the race, but were classified as they completed over 75% of the race distance.

=== Teams' championship ===
Pos	Team	ARA (Spain)			CRT (Spain)			ALG (Portugal)			CAT (Spain)		JER (Spain)			NAV (Spain)				Pts
1	(Netherlands) MP Motorsport	2	2	2	2	3	3	1	2	2	C	2	2	2	1	2	1	3	3	277
2	(Spain) Drivex School	3	4	3	1	1	2	5	1	1	C	1	4	5	7	4	3	1	1	257
3	(Spain) FA Racing	1	1	1	6	4	Ret	4	Ret	4	C	Ret	1	1	2	1	4	Ret	6	200
4	(Spain) Fórmula de Campeones - Praga F4	6	5	7	Ret	2	1	2	3	Ret	C	4	5	4	3	7	7	4	8	151

=== Galfer Trophy ===
Trophy for the fastest laps during the race.

Pos	Driver	Pts.
1	(Belgium) Amaury Cordeel	9
2	(Spain) Guillem Pujeu	5
3	(Sweden) Isaac Blomqvist	1
3	(Czech Republic) Petr Ptáček	1
3	(Spain) Xavier Lloveras	1
