= 2020 Toyota Racing Series =

Motor racing competition

The 2020 Castrol Toyota Racing Series was the sixteenth running of the Toyota Racing Series, the premier open-wheel motorsport category held in New Zealand. The series consisted of fifteen races at five meetings. It began on 17 January at Highlands Motorsport Park, in Cromwell, and concluded on 16 February with the 65th running of the New Zealand Grand Prix, at Circuit Chris Amon in Feilding.

The championship was won by Igor Fraga, who became the first Brazilian driver to win the title. Despite securing one extra victory with five wins compared to Fraga's four, defending champion and series returnee Liam Lawson would end the season as the runner-up. Yuki Tsunoda, Franco Colapinto, Tijmen van der Helm, Caio Collet, Jackson Walls, and Émilien Denner all secured one victory each.

== Changes ==
=== Technical ===
In May 2019, the new Tatuus F.3 T-318, nicknamed "FT-60", chassis was revealed to be the chassis used from the 2020 season onwards. The change in chassis will also be accompanied by a new engine. The modified 1.8L Toyota four cylinder 2ZZ-GE production engines that were used since the series' inception will be replaced with a 2.0L turbocharged unit, increasing power output from 200bhp (150kW) to 270bhp (200kW). The top speed of the cars has increased to 250 km/h. The improved aerodynamics mean that the FT-60 is expected to generate around 25% more downforce that its predecessor. The six-speed Sadev paddle-shift sequential will remain.

=== Tyres ===
In July 2019, it was announced that Hankook would become the series' tyre supplier starting from the 2020 season. The new contract stipulates that 1,600 tyres will be brought in for each season, with each driver receiving 17 sets of tyres, with the ability to add a further two sets of wet weather tyres if required. The tyre is of the same specification used in Formula Renault Eurocup and the W Series. Tyre dimensions will also be changed in conjunction with the changing of supplier; 230/560 for the fronts and 280/580 for the rear.

== Teams and drivers ==
All teams are based and registered in New Zealand.

Team	No.	Driver	Rounds
M2 Competition	1	(New Zealand) Liam Lawson	All
M2 Competition	6	(Israel) Ido Cohen	All
M2 Competition	17	(Brazil) Igor Fraga	All
M2 Competition	21	(France) Émilien Denner	All
M2 Competition	33	(Japan) Yuki Tsunoda	All
M2 Competition	99	(Angola) Rui Andrade	All
Giles Motorsport	4	(Sweden) Henning Enqvist	All
Giles Motorsport	26	(Switzerland) Grégoire Saucy	All
Giles Motorsport	44	(Germany) Lirim Zendeli	All
Giles Motorsport	49	(New Zealand) Ken Smith	5
Giles Motorsport	62	(New Zealand) Chelsea Herbert	1–2
Kiwi Motorsport	5	(United States) Spike Kohlbecker	All
Kiwi Motorsport	7	(Switzerland) Axel Gnos	All
Kiwi Motorsport	13	(Netherlands) Tijmen van der Helm	3–5
Kiwi Motorsport	16	(Belgium) Amaury Cordeel	1
Kiwi Motorsport	32	(Puerto Rico) José Blanco-Chock	1–2
Kiwi Motorsport	43	(Argentina) Franco Colapinto	All
mtec Motorsport engineered by R-ace GP	9	(Czech Republic) Petr Ptáček	All
mtec Motorsport engineered by R-ace GP	10	(Denmark) Oliver Rasmussen	All
mtec Motorsport engineered by R-ace GP	11	(Australia) Jackson Walls	All
mtec Motorsport engineered by R-ace GP	23	(Brazil) Caio Collet	All
mtec Motorsport engineered by R-ace GP	88	(Sweden) Lucas Petersson	All

=== Team changes ===
A joint three-year effort between MTEC Motorsport and France-based R-ace GP will see the latter organization take charge of the race engineering side of the operation starting from the 2020 season.

MP Motorsport and Kiwi Motorsport announced they would be joining forces by supplying engineers and mechanics.

== Race calendar ==
The 2020 calendar was announced on 30 April 2019 with each round to have three races, with qualifying taking place for both races one and three.

Round		Circuit	Date	Pole position	Fastest lap	Winning driver	Winning team
1	R1	Highlands Motorsport Park (Cromwell, Otago)	18 January	(Brazil) Caio Collet	(Brazil) Caio Collet	(New Zealand) Liam Lawson (Note: Caio Collet originally won the race, but received a 5-second time penalty for performing a practice start on the formation lap.)	M2 Competition
1	R2	Highlands Motorsport Park (Cromwell, Otago)	19 January		(Denmark) Oliver Rasmussen	(Japan) Yuki Tsunoda	M2 Competition
1	R3	Highlands Motorsport Park (Cromwell, Otago)	19 January	(New Zealand) Liam Lawson	(New Zealand) Liam Lawson	(New Zealand) Liam Lawson	M2 Competition
2	R1	Teretonga Park (Invercargill, Southland)	25 January	(Brazil) Igor Fraga	(Brazil) Caio Collet	(Brazil) Caio Collet	mtec Motorsport engineered by R-ace GP
2	R2	Teretonga Park (Invercargill, Southland)	26 January		(Brazil) Igor Fraga	(France) Émilien Denner	M2 Competition
2	R3	Teretonga Park (Invercargill, Southland)	26 January	(Australia) Jackson Walls	(New Zealand) Liam Lawson	(New Zealand) Liam Lawson	M2 Competition
3	R1	Hampton Downs Motorsport Park (Hampton Downs, North Waikato)	1 February	(Czech Republic) Petr Ptáček	(New Zealand) Liam Lawson	(Brazil) Igor Fraga	M2 Competition
3	R2	Hampton Downs Motorsport Park (Hampton Downs, North Waikato)	2 February		(New Zealand) Liam Lawson	(Argentina) Franco Colapinto	Kiwi Motorsport
3	R3	Hampton Downs Motorsport Park (Hampton Downs, North Waikato)	2 February	(Brazil) Igor Fraga	(Brazil) Igor Fraga	(Brazil) Igor Fraga	M2 Competition
4	R1	Pukekohe Park Raceway (Pukekohe, Auckland Region)	8 February	(New Zealand) Liam Lawson	(New Zealand) Liam Lawson	(New Zealand) Liam Lawson	M2 Competition
4	R2	Pukekohe Park Raceway (Pukekohe, Auckland Region)	9 February		(New Zealand) Liam Lawson	(Australia) Jackson Walls	mtec Motorsport engineered by R-ace GP
4	R3	Pukekohe Park Raceway (Pukekohe, Auckland Region)	9 February	(New Zealand) Liam Lawson	(New Zealand) Liam Lawson	(New Zealand) Liam Lawson	M2 Competition
5	R1	Manfeild: Circuit Chris Amon (Feilding, Manawatū District)	15 February	(Argentina) Franco Colapinto	(Brazil) Igor Fraga	(Brazil) Igor Fraga	M2 Competition
5	R2	Manfeild: Circuit Chris Amon (Feilding, Manawatū District)	16 February		(Argentina) Franco Colapinto	(Netherlands) Tijmen van der Helm	Kiwi Motorsport
5	R3	Manfeild: Circuit Chris Amon (Feilding, Manawatū District)	16 February	(Brazil) Igor Fraga	(Argentina) Franco Colapinto	(Brazil) Igor Fraga	M2 Competition

== Championship standings ==
The series had introduced a new drivers' championship points system for the season. Drivers were awarded the same number of points for Races 1 & 3. Race 2 featured a reversed grid of the top 6 to 8 finishers from Race 1, and awarded reduced points to the top 15 finishers. Drivers must have completed 75% of the race distance and be running at the finish to score points.

=== Scoring system ===
Race (starting grid from qualifying)

Position	1st	2nd	3rd	4th	5th	6th	7th	8th	9th	10th	11th	12th	13th	14th	15th	16th	17th	18th	19th	20th
Points	35	31	27	24	22	20	18	16	14	12	10	9	8	7	6	5	4	3	2	1

Reversed grid Race

Position	1st	2nd	3rd	4th	5th	6th	7th	8th	9th	10th	11th	12th	13th	14th	15th
Points	20	18	16	14	12	10	9	8	7	6	5	4	3	2	1

=== Drivers' championship ===
Pos.	Driver	HIG			TER			HMP			PUK			MAN			Points
1	(Brazil) Igor Fraga	2	7	3	**3**	6	2	1	4	**1**	2	5	8	1	4	**1**	362
2	(New Zealand) Liam Lawson	1	5	**1**	6	3	1	2	2	Ret	**1**	4	**1**	2	5	3	356
3	(Argentina) Franco Colapinto	9	6	2	4	5	8	5	1	8	3	3	2	**3**	2	2	315
4	(Japan) Yuki Tsunoda	5	1	4	11	7	3	7	16	3	4	7	4	9	7	6	257
5	(Czech Republic) Petr Ptáček	8	8	6	9	14	10	**3**	5	10	5	2	5	7	3	5	241
6	(Switzerland) Grégoire Saucy	4	4	5	2	9	6	9	8	2	10	6	17	15	13	9	220
7	(Brazil) Caio Collet	**7**	Ret	DNS	1	8	5	4	6	4	Ret	14	7	4	6	4	219
8	(Germany) Lirim Zendeli	3	3	8	7	2	12	10	7	5	12	Ret	3	13	15	13	200
9	(Israel) Ido Cohen	10	11	7	5	4	11	11	14	Ret	7	8	6	11	11	11	164
10	(Australia) Jackson Walls	12	9	Ret	Ret	15	**4**	8	9	12	6	1	10	10	9	8	160
11	(Denmark) Oliver Rasmussen	6	2	17	13	11	Ret	6	3	9	8	11	11	12	12	12	158
12	(Sweden) Lucas Petersson	16	13	10	12	12	7	16	11	7	Ret	12	13	8	8	10	127
13	(United States) Spike Kohlbecker	13	12	12	17	13	13	14	15	Ret	14	13	12	5	10	7	109
14	(Netherlands) Tijmen van der Helm							17	17	11	11	10	9	6	1	Ret	84
15	(France) Émilien Denner	11	10	9	8	1	Ret	Ret	12	Ret	Ret	DNS	DNS	Ret	14	Ret	72
16	(Angola) Rui Andrade	14	14	16	15	16	14	13	13	Ret	9	9	15	16	18	Ret	70
17	(Sweden) Henning Enqvist	Ret	18	14	16	Ret	16	12	10	6	13	15	14	Ret	16	Ret	68
18	(Switzerland) Axel Gnos	15	16	11	14	17	15	15	Ret	Ret	15	16	16	14	17	14	60
19	(Puerto Rico) José Blanco-Chock	Ret	15	13	10	10	9										41
20	(New Zealand) Chelsea Herbert	17	17	15	DNS	WD	WD										10
21	(New Zealand) Ken Smith													17	19	15	10
—	(Belgium) Amaury Cordeel	WD	WD	WD													—
Pos.	Driver	HIG			TER			HMP			PUK			MAN			Points

Colour	Result
Gold	Winner
Silver	Second place
Bronze	Third place
Green	Points classification
Blue	Non-points classification
Blue	Non-classified finish (NC)
Purple	Retired, not classified (Ret)
Red	Did not qualify (DNQ)
Red	Did not pre-qualify (DNPQ)
Black	Disqualified (DSQ)
White	Did not start (DNS)
White	Withdrew (WD)
White	Race cancelled (C)
Blank	Did not practice (DNP)
Blank	Did not arrive (DNA)
Blank	Excluded (EX)

**Bold** – Pole
Italics – Fastest Lap
