= Petr Ptáček =

Czech racing driver (born 2002)

- Nationality: (Czech Republic) Czech
- Born: Petr Ptáček Jr. 16 October 2002 (age 24) Prague, Czech Republic

Previous series
- 2019–2020 2019–2020 2019 2018–19 2018 2018 2018 2017–18: Formula Renault Eurocup; Toyota Racing Series; F3 Asian Championship; MRF Challenge; Italian F4 Championship; ADAC Formula 4 F4 Spanish Championship; Formula 4 UAE Championship

Petr Ptáček Jr. (born 16 October 2002) is a Czech former racing driver who last competed for R-ace GP in the 2020 Formula Renault Eurocup. He was a member of the Sauber Junior Team in 2020.

== Racing record ==
=== Racing career summary ===
| Season | Series | Team | Races | Wins | Poles | F/Laps | Podiums | Points | Position |
|---|---|---|---|---|---|---|---|---|---|
| 2017–18 | Formula 4 UAE Championship | Rasgaira Motorsports | 10 | 0 | 0 | 0 | 2 | 72 | 10th |
| 2018 | Italian F4 Championship | Bhaitech | 20 | 0 | 0 | 4 | 6 | 182 | 5th |
| 2018 | F4 Spanish Championship | Fórmula de Campeones - Praga F4 | 8 | 1 | 1 | 1 | 4 | 85 | 7th |
| 2018 | ADAC Formula 4 Championship | US Racing–CHRS | 3 | 0 | 0 | 0 | 0 | 0 | NC† |
| 2018–19 | MRF Challenge Formula 2000 | MRF Racing | 10 | 0 | 0 | 0 | 2 | 91 | 8th |
| 2019 | Toyota Racing Series | Giles Motorsport | 15 | 0 | 0 | 0 | 1 | 123 | 11th |
| 2019 | Formula Renault Eurocup | Bhaitech | 20 | 0 | 0 | 0 | 2 | 70 | 8th |
| 2019 | F3 Asian Championship | Seven GP | 3 | 0 | 1 | 0 | 1 | 27 | 11th |
| 2020 | Toyota Racing Series | mtec Motorsport | 15 | 0 | 1 | 0 | 3 | 241 | 5th |
| 2020 | Formula Renault Eurocup | R-ace GP | 14 | 0 | 0 | 0 | 0 | 39 | 14th |
| 2020 | Formula Renault Eurocup | MP Motorsport | 6 | 0 | 0 | 0 | 0 | 39 | 14th |

^{†} As Ptáček was a guest driver, he was ineligible for points.

=== Complete Formula 4 UAE Championship results ===
(key) (Races in bold indicate pole position) (Races in italics indicate fastest lap)

| Year | Team | 1 | 2 | 3 | 4 | 5 | 6 | 7 | 8 | 9 | 10 | 11 | 12 | 13 | 14 | 15 | 16 | 17 | 18 | 19 | 20 | 21 | 22 | 23 | 24 | Pos | Points |
|---|---|---|---|---|---|---|---|---|---|---|---|---|---|---|---|---|---|---|---|---|---|---|---|---|---|---|---|
| 2017-18 | Rasgaira Motorsports | YMC1; 1; 6 | YMC1; 2; 3 | YMC1; 3; 4 | YMC1; 4; 3 | YMC2; 1; 7 | YMC2; 2; 9 | YMC2; 3 DNS | YMC2; 4 DNS | DUB1; 1 | DUB1; 2 | DUB1; 3 | DUB1; 4 | YMC3; 1; 9 | YMC3; 2 Ret | YMC3; 3 Ret | YMC3; 4; 6 | YMC4; 1 | YMC4; 2 | YMC4; 3 | YMC4; 4 | DUB2; 1 | DUB2; 2 | DUB2; 3 | DUB2; 4 | 10th | 80 |

=== Complete Italian F4 Championship results ===
(key) (Races in bold indicate pole position) (Races in italics indicate fastest lap)

| Year | Team | 1 | 2 | 3 | 4 | 5 | 6 | 7 | 8 | 9 | 10 | 11 | 12 | 13 | 14 | 15 | 16 | 17 | 18 | 19 | 20 | 21 | Pos | Points |
|---|---|---|---|---|---|---|---|---|---|---|---|---|---|---|---|---|---|---|---|---|---|---|---|---|
| 2018 | Bhaitech | ADR; 1; 10 | ADR; 2; 8 | ADR; 3; 17 | LEC; 1; 4 | LEC; 2; 13 | LEC; 3; 7 | MNZ; 1 Ret | MNZ; 2; 6 | MNZ; 3; 4 | MIS; 1; 2 | MIS; 2; 2 | MIS; 3; 3 | IMO; 1; 5 | IMO; 2; 5 | IMO; 3; 3 | VLL; 1 Ret | VLL; 2; 3 | VLL; 3; 2 | MUG; 1; 6 | MUG; 2 Ret | MUG; 3; 4 | 5th | 182 |

=== Complete F4 Spanish Championship results ===
(key) (Races in bold indicate pole position) (Races in italics indicate fastest lap)

| Year | Team | 1 | 2 | 3 | 4 | 5 | 6 | 7 | 8 | 9 | 10 | 11 | 12 | 13 | 14 | 15 | 16 | 17 | 18 | DC | Points |
|---|---|---|---|---|---|---|---|---|---|---|---|---|---|---|---|---|---|---|---|---|---|
| 2018 | Fórmula de Campeones - Praga F4 | ARA; 1; 6 | ARA; 2; 5 | ARA; 3; 7 | CRT; 1 Ret | **CRT**; **2**; 2 | **CRT**; **3**; 1 | ALG; 1; 2 | ALG; 2; 3 | ALG; 3 Ret | CAT; 1 | CAT; 2 | JER; 1 | JER; 2 | JER; 3 | NAV; 1 | NAV; 2 | NAV; 3 | NAV; 4 | 7th | 85 |

=== Complete ADAC Formula 4 Championship results ===
(key) (Races in bold indicate pole position) (Races in italics indicate fastest lap)

| Year | Team | 1 | 2 | 3 | 4 | 5 | 6 | 7 | 8 | 9 | 10 | 11 | 12 | 13 | 14 | 15 | 16 | 17 | 18 | 19 | 20 | Pos | Points |
|---|---|---|---|---|---|---|---|---|---|---|---|---|---|---|---|---|---|---|---|---|---|---|---|
| 2018 | US Racing - CHRS | OSC; 1 | OSC; 2 | OSC; 3 | HOC1; 1 | HOC1; 2 | HOC1; 3 | LAU; 1 | LAU; 2 | LAU; 3 | RBR; 1 | RBR; 2 | RBR; 3 | HOC2; 1 | HOC2; 2 | NÜR; 1 | NÜR; 2 | NÜR; 3 | HOC3; 1; 8 | HOC3; 2; 9 | HOC3; 3; 10 | NC† | 0 |

^{†} As Ptáček was a guest driver, he was ineligible for points.

=== Complete MRF Challenge Formula 2000 Championship results ===
(key) (Races in bold indicate pole position) (Races in italics indicate fastest lap)

| Year | 1 | 2 | 3 | 4 | 5 | 6 | 7 | 8 | 9 | 10 | 11 | 12 | 13 | 14 | 15 | DC | Points |
|---|---|---|---|---|---|---|---|---|---|---|---|---|---|---|---|---|---|
| 2018-19 | DUB; 1; 6 | DUB; 2; 2 | DUB; 3; 4 | DUB; 4; 10 | DUB; 5; 6 | BHR; 1; 6 | BHR; 2; 9 | BHR; 3; 6 | BHR; 4; 2 | BHR; 5; 7 | CHE; 1 | CHE; 2 | CHE; 3 | CHE; 4 | CHE; 5 | 8th | 91 |

=== Complete Toyota Racing Series results ===
(key) (Races in bold indicate pole position) (Races in italics indicate fastest lap)

| Year | Team | 1 | 2 | 3 | 4 | 5 | 6 | 7 | 8 | 9 | 10 | 11 | 12 | 13 | 14 | 15 | 16 | 17 | DC | Points |
|---|---|---|---|---|---|---|---|---|---|---|---|---|---|---|---|---|---|---|---|---|
| 2019 | Giles Motorsport | HIG; 1; 7 | HIG; 2; 8 | HIG; 3; 5 | TER; 1; 12 | TER; 2 C | TER; 3 C | HMP; 1; 2 | HMP; 2 Ret | HMP; 3; 11 | HMP; 4; 12 | TAU; 1; 14 | TAU; 2; 7 | TAU; 3; 11 | TAU; 4 Ret | MAN; 1 Ret | MAN; 2; 12 | MAN; 3 Ret | 11th | 123 |
| 2020 | mtec Motorsport | HIG; 1; 8 | HIG; 2; 8 | HIG; 3; 6 | TER; 1; 9 | TER; 2; 14 | TER; 3; 10 | **HMP**; **1**; 3 | HMP; 2; 5 | HMP; 3; 10 | PUK; 1; 5 | PUK; 2; 2 | PUK; 3; 5 | MAN; 1; 7 | MAN; 2; 3 | MAN; 3; 5 | | | 5th | 241 |

=== Complete Formula Renault Eurocup results ===
(key) (Races in bold indicate pole position) (Races in italics indicate fastest lap)

| Year | Team | 1 | 2 | 3 | 4 | 5 | 6 | 7 | 8 | 9 | 10 | 11 | 12 | 13 | 14 | 15 | 16 | 17 | 18 | 19 | 20 | Pos | Points |
|---|---|---|---|---|---|---|---|---|---|---|---|---|---|---|---|---|---|---|---|---|---|---|---|
| 2019 | Bhaitech | MNZ; 1; 9 | MNZ; 2; 12 | SIL; 1; 3 | SIL; 2; 15 | MON; 1; 11 | MON; 2 Ret | LEC; 1 Ret | LEC; 2; 20 | SPA; 1; 7 | SPA; 2; 14 | NÜR; 1; 11 | NÜR; 2; 5 | HUN; 1; 16 | HUN; 2; 7 | CAT; 1; 6 | CAT; 2; 2 | HOC; 1; 10 | HOC; 2; 9 | YMC; 1; 11 | YMC; 2; 13 | 8th | 70 |
| 2020 | R-ace GP | MNZ; 1; 9 | MNZ; 2; 14 | IMO; 1 Ret | IMO; 2 Ret | NÜR; 1; 8 | NÜR; 2; 11 | MAG; 1; 8 | MAG; 2 Ret | ZAN; 1; 4 | ZAN; 2; 6 | CAT; 1; 15 | CAT; 2 Ret | SPA; 1; 13 | SPA; 2; 13 | | | | | | | 14th | 39 |
| 2020 | MP Motorsport | | | | | | | | | | | | | | | IMO; 1; 10 | IMO; 2; 6 | HOC; 1 Ret | HOC; 2; 12 | LEC; 1; 17 | LEC; 2; 12 | 14th | 39 |

=== Complete F3 Asian Championship results ===
(key) (Races in bold indicate pole position; races in italics indicate fastest lap)

| Year | Entrant | 1 | 2 | 3 | 4 | 5 | 6 | 7 | 8 | 9 | 10 | 11 | 12 | 13 | 14 | 15 | DC | Points |
|---|---|---|---|---|---|---|---|---|---|---|---|---|---|---|---|---|---|---|
| 2019 | Seven GP | SEP; 1 | SEP; 2 | SEP; 3 | CHA; 1 | CHA; 2 | CHA; 3 | SUZ; 1; 3 | SUZ; 2; 4 | **SUZ**; **3** Ret | SIC1; 1 | SIC1; 2 | SIC1; 3 | SIC2; 1 | SIC2; 2 | SIC2; 3 | 11th | 27 |
