= 2020 Formula Renault Eurocup =

Motor racing competition

The 2020 Formula Renault Eurocup was a multi-event motor racing championship for open-wheel, formula racing cars held across Europe. The championship featured drivers competing in 1.8 litre Formula Renault single-seat race cars that conform to the technical regulations of Formula Regional. The 2020 season was the 30th and final season Eurocup Formula Renault organised by Renault Sport, as it merged with the Formula Regional European Championship for the 2021 season. The series visited nine circuits around Europe. The championship was won by Victor Martins, with ART Grand Prix taking the teams' title.

== Teams and drivers ==
In September 2019, ART Grand Prix announced its intention to compete in the championship for the first time since 2003. Their bid was successful, with the team joining eight other teams from 2019. On 3 July 2020 it was announced that Global Racing Service had withdrawn from the season due to the effects of the COVID-19 pandemic.

Teams	No.	Driver name	Status	Rounds
(France) R-ace GP	1	(Brazil) Caio Collet		All
(France) R-ace GP	2	(United Kingdom) Johnathan Hoggard	R	2
(France) R-ace GP	2	(Finland) Elias Seppänen	R G	10
(France) R-ace GP	3	(Czech Republic) Petr Ptáček		1–7
(France) R-ace GP	3	(Russia) Michael Belov	R	8–10
(Netherlands) MP Motorsport	11	(Argentina) Franco Colapinto		All
(Netherlands) MP Motorsport	12	(Netherlands) Joey Alders		1–2
(Netherlands) MP Motorsport	12	(Czech Republic) Roman Staněk		5
(Netherlands) MP Motorsport	12	(Netherlands) Kas Haverkort	R G	6–7
(Netherlands) MP Motorsport	12	(Czech Republic) Petr Ptáček		8–10
(Netherlands) MP Motorsport	17	(France) Hadrien David	R	All
(United Kingdom) Arden Motorsport	20	(United Kingdom) Alex Quinn	R	All
(United Kingdom) Arden Motorsport	21	(France) Reshad de Gerus	R	All
(United Kingdom) Arden Motorsport	27	(Belgium) Ugo de Wilde		All
(Italy) JD Motorsport	32	(Spain) David Vidales	R	2–10
(Italy) JD Motorsport	38	(Finland) William Alatalo	R	All
(Belgium) M2 Competition	44	(Russia) Michael Belov	R	1–2
(Italy) Bhaitech Racing	51	(Hungary) László Tóth	R	All
(Italy) Bhaitech Racing	52	(Italy) Nicola Marinangeli	R	1–2, 5–10
(Italy) Bhaitech Racing	52	(Italy) Vicky Piria		3–4
(Italy) Bhaitech Racing	53	(Italy) Lorenzo Colombo		All
(Spain) FA Racing	71	(Belgium) Amaury Cordeel		All
(Spain) FA Racing	72	(United Kingdom) Abbi Pulling	R G	8
(Spain) FA Racing	73	(Netherlands) Tijmen van der Helm	R	All
(France) ART Grand Prix	91	(Estonia) Paul Aron	R	All
(France) ART Grand Prix	92	(France) Victor Martins		All
(France) ART Grand Prix	93	(Switzerland) Grégoire Saucy		All

Icon	Status
R	Rookie
G	Guest drivers ineligible for points

- Kush Maini was scheduled to compete for R-ace GP, but withdrew prior to the start of the season.
- Jackson Walls was scheduled to compete for Arden Motorsport, but did not appear at any rounds. He was replaced by Alex Quinn.
- Reece Ushijima was scheduled to compete for M2 Competition, but withdrew prior to the start of the season.
- Xavier Lloveras and Belén García were set to drive for Global Racing Service, but were left without a drive following the team's withdrawal.

== Calendar ==
The provisional calendar for the 2020 season was announced on 11 September 2019.

On 15 May 2020, Renault Sport unveiled a new 10-round calendar, after multiple postponements and cancellations due to the COVID-19 pandemic. The revised calendar included races at Magny-Cours for the first time since 2010, as well as a return to Imola and Zandvoort, where the series had last raced in 2004 and 2000 respectively. The rounds at Monaco, the Hungaroring and Silverstone were not rescheduled and were absent from the revised calendar. On 25 September 2020, it was announced that the series would support the 2020 Emilia Romagna Grand Prix at Imola to make up for the loss of the Monaco round.

Round		Circuit	Date	Supporting
1	R1	(Italy) Autodromo Nazionale di Monza	10 July	24H GT Series; 24H TCE Series
1	R2	(Italy) Autodromo Nazionale di Monza	11 July	24H GT Series; 24H TCE Series
2	R1	(Italy) Autodromo Enzo e Dino Ferrari	25 July	GT World Challenge Europe Endurance Cup
2	R2	(Italy) Autodromo Enzo e Dino Ferrari	26 July	GT World Challenge Europe Endurance Cup
3	R1	(Germany) Nürburgring	5 September	GT World Challenge Europe Endurance Cup
3	R2	(Germany) Nürburgring	6 September	GT World Challenge Europe Endurance Cup
4	R1	(France) Circuit de Nevers Magny-Cours	12 September	GT World Challenge Europe Sprint Cup; French F4 Championship
4	R2	(France) Circuit de Nevers Magny-Cours	13 September	GT World Challenge Europe Sprint Cup; French F4 Championship
5	R1	(Netherlands) Circuit Zandvoort	26 September	GT World Challenge Europe Sprint Cup
5	R2	(Netherlands) Circuit Zandvoort	27 September	GT World Challenge Europe Sprint Cup
6	R1	(Spain) Circuit de Barcelona-Catalunya	10 October	GT World Challenge Europe Sprint Cup
6	R2	(Spain) Circuit de Barcelona-Catalunya	11 October	GT World Challenge Europe Sprint Cup
7	R1	(Belgium) Circuit de Spa-Francorchamps	23 October	GT World Challenge Europe Endurance Cup
7	R2	(Belgium) Circuit de Spa-Francorchamps	24 October	GT World Challenge Europe Endurance Cup
8	R1	(Italy) Autodromo Enzo e Dino Ferrari	31 October	Emilia Romagna Grand Prix
8	R2	(Italy) Autodromo Enzo e Dino Ferrari	1 November	Emilia Romagna Grand Prix
9	R1	(Germany) Hockenheimring	7 November	Deutsche Tourenwagen Masters
9	R2	(Germany) Hockenheimring	8 November	Deutsche Tourenwagen Masters
10	R1	(France) Circuit Paul Ricard	14 November	GT World Challenge Europe Endurance Cup; French F4 Championship
10	R2	(France) Circuit Paul Ricard	15 November	GT World Challenge Europe Endurance Cup; French F4 Championship
Cancelled due to the 2019-20 coronavirus pandemic
		Circuit	Original Date	Originally Supporting
		(United Kingdom) Silverstone Circuit	9 and 10 May	
		Circuit de Monaco	23 and 24 May	Monaco Grand Prix
		(Hungary) Hungaroring	26 and 27 September	GT World Challenge Europe
		(United Arab Emirates) Yas Marina Circuit	13 and 14 November	

== Results ==
Round		Circuit	Pole position	Fastest lap	Winning driver	Winning team	Rookie winner
1	R1	(Italy) Monza	(United Kingdom) Alex Quinn	(United Kingdom) Alex Quinn	(Argentina) Franco Colapinto	(Netherlands) MP Motorsport	(United Kingdom) Alex Quinn
1	R2	(Italy) Monza	(France) Victor Martins	(Netherlands) Joey Alders	(Brazil) Caio Collet	(France) R-ace GP	(Russia) Michael Belov
2	R1	(Italy) Imola	(Spain) David Vidales	(Spain) David Vidales	(Spain) David Vidales	(Italy) JD Motorsport	(Spain) David Vidales
2	R2	(Italy) Imola	(Finland) William Alatalo	(Spain) David Vidales	(Spain) David Vidales	(Italy) JD Motorsport	(Spain) David Vidales
3	R1	(Germany) Nürburgring	(France) Victor Martins	(France) Victor Martins	(France) Victor Martins	(France) ART Grand Prix	(Spain) David Vidales
3	R2	(Germany) Nürburgring	(France) Victor Martins	(France) Victor Martins	(France) Victor Martins	(France) ART Grand Prix	(Estonia) Paul Aron
4	R1	(France) Magny-Cours	(Brazil) Caio Collet	(Argentina) Franco Colapinto	(Brazil) Caio Collet	(France) R-ace GP	(Spain) David Vidales
4	R2	(France) Magny-Cours	(France) Victor Martins	(France) Victor Martins	(France) Victor Martins	(France) ART Grand Prix	(Spain) David Vidales
5	R1	(Netherlands) Zandvoort	(France) Victor Martins	(France) Victor Martins	(France) Victor Martins	(France) ART Grand Prix	(Spain) David Vidales
5	R2	(Netherlands) Zandvoort	(Brazil) Caio Collet	(France) Victor Martins	(Brazil) Caio Collet	(France) R-ace GP	(Spain) David Vidales
6	R1	(Spain) Catalunya	(France) Victor Martins	(France) Victor Martins	(France) Victor Martins	(France) ART Grand Prix	(France) Hadrien David
6	R2	(Spain) Catalunya	(France) Victor Martins	(France) Victor Martins	(France) Victor Martins	(France) ART Grand Prix	(Spain) David Vidales
7	R1	(Belgium) Spa-Francorchamps	(France) Victor Martins	(France) Victor Martins	(Argentina) Franco Colapinto	(Netherlands) MP Motorsport	(United Kingdom) Alex Quinn
7	R2	(Belgium) Spa-Francorchamps	(France) Victor Martins	(Brazil) Caio Collet	(United Kingdom) Alex Quinn	(United Kingdom) Arden Motorsport	(United Kingdom) Alex Quinn
8	R1	(Italy) Imola	(Italy) Lorenzo Colombo	(Brazil) Caio Collet	(Brazil) Caio Collet	(France) R-ace GP	(United Kingdom) Alex Quinn
8	R2	(Italy) Imola	(France) Victor Martins	(Argentina) Franco Colapinto	(France) Victor Martins	(France) ART Grand Prix	(France) Hadrien David
9	R1	(Germany) Hockenheim	(Brazil) Caio Collet	(Brazil) Caio Collet	(Brazil) Caio Collet	(France) R-ace GP	(United Kingdom) Alex Quinn
9	R2	(Germany) Hockenheim	(Italy) Lorenzo Colombo	(Italy) Lorenzo Colombo	(Italy) Lorenzo Colombo	(Italy) Bhaitech Racing	(United Kingdom) Alex Quinn
10	R1	(France) Paul Ricard	(Italy) Lorenzo Colombo	(Brazil) Caio Collet	(Italy) Lorenzo Colombo	(Italy) Bhaitech Racing	(United Kingdom) Alex Quinn
10	R2	(France) Paul Ricard	(Italy) Lorenzo Colombo	(Italy) Lorenzo Colombo	(Italy) Lorenzo Colombo	(Italy) Bhaitech Racing	(United Kingdom) Alex Quinn

== Championship standings ==
Points system

Points were awarded to the top 10 classified finishers.

Position	**1st**	**2nd**	**3rd**	**4th**	**5th**	**6th**	**7th**	**8th**	**9th**	**10th**
Points	25	18	15	12	10	8	6	4	2	1

=== Drivers' championship ===
Pos.	Driver	MNZ (Italy)		IMO (Italy)		NÜR (Germany)		MAG (France)		ZAN (Netherlands)		CAT (Spain)		SPA^{‡} (Belgium)		IMO (Italy)		HOC (Germany)		LEC (France)		Points
Pos.	Driver	R1	R2	R1	R2	R1	R2	R1	R2	R1	R2	R1	R2	R1	R2	R1	R2	R1	R2	R1	R2	Points
1	(France) Victor Martins	10	**2**	4	4	**1**	**1**	3	**1**	**1**	2	**1**	**1**	**2**	**4**	5	**1**	2	2	4	2	348
2	(Brazil) Caio Collet	3	1	2	5	6	4	**1**	2	2	**1**	2	2	7	6	1	Ret	**1**	Ret	2	4	304
3	(Argentina) Franco Colapinto	1	3	6	7	7	6	13	Ret	6	3	6	3	1	12	4	2	4	3	3	3	213.5
4	(United Kingdom) Alex Quinn	**2**	Ret	5	3	13	9	5	5	8	12	7	Ret	4	1	2	4	3	4	5	5	183
5	(Italy) Lorenzo Colombo	13	Ret	7	11	2	5	6	4	9	5	14	9	WD	WD	**3**	11	5	**1**	**1**	**1**	170
6	(Spain) David Vidales			**1**	1	3	8	2	3	3	4	11	4	10	16	Ret	Ret	6	7	6	9	169
7	(Switzerland) Grégoire Saucy	11	8	14	13	4	3	4	6	10	8	4	Ret	11	3	Ret	7	Ret	Ret	7	15	95.5
8	(Finland) William Alatalo	Ret	5	3	**2**	5	Ret	9	8	11	10	12	8	9	9	8	9	7	9	11	7	92
9	(Belgium) Ugo de Wilde	8	Ret	8	8	12	12	7	7	12	13	3	Ret	3	2	9	5	Ret	8	8	11	85.5
10	(France) Hadrien David	7	6	9	12	14	7	Ret	13	16	11	5	6	8	14	6	3	10	Ret	9	Ret	71
11	(Estonia) Paul Aron	Ret	12	Ret	6	11	2	10	12	7	17	8	12	Ret	DNS	Ret	8	9	5	10	17	54
12	(Netherlands) Tijmen van der Helm	4	9	12	9	10	13	DNS	DNS	13	7	10	7	12	7	12	14	8	13	16	14	45
13	(Russia) Michael Belov	5	4	10	Ret											11	10	14	6	15	6	40
14	(Czech Republic) Petr Ptáček	9	14	Ret	Ret	8	11	8	Ret	4	6	15	Ret	13	13	10	6	Ret	12	17	12	39
15	(Belgium) Amaury Cordeel	6	Ret	11	10	9	10	Ret	9	5	DNS	13	13	6	10	14	13	12	11	13	10	33
16	(Hungary) László Tóth	15	7	16	16	16	14	11	11	18	16	16	10	15	8	Ret	15	11	14	19	16	14
17	(France) Reshad de Gerus	14	13	15	15	15	Ret	12	Ret	15	14	17	11	14	15	7	12	15	10	12	Ret	8
18	(Czech Republic) Roman Staněk									14	9											2
19	(Netherlands) Joey Alders	Ret	10	13	17																	1
20	(Italy) Vicky Piria					17	15	Ret	10													1
21	(Italy) Nicola Marinangeli	12	11	17	14					17	15	18	Ret	16	11	13	Ret	13	15	18	13	1
22	(United Kingdom) Johnathan Hoggard			Ret	18†																	0
guest drivers ineligible to score points
—	(Netherlands) Kas Haverkort											9	5	5	5							—
—	(Finland) Elias Seppänen																			14	8	—
—	(United Kingdom) Abbi Pulling															15	16					—
Pos.	Driver	R1	R2	R1	R2	R1	R2	R1	R2	R1	R2	R1	R2	R1	R2	R1	R2	R1	R2	R1	R2	Points
Pos.	Driver	MNZ (Italy)		IMO (Italy)		NÜR (Germany)		MAG (France)		ZAN (Netherlands)		CAT (Spain)		SPA (Belgium)		IMO (Italy)		HOC (Germany)		LEC (France)		Points

Colour	Result
Gold	Winner
Silver	Second place
Bronze	Third place
Green	Points classification
Blue	Non-points classification
Blue	Non-classified finish (NC)
Purple	Retired, not classified (Ret)
Red	Did not qualify (DNQ)
Red	Did not pre-qualify (DNPQ)
Black	Disqualified (DSQ)
White	Did not start (DNS)
White	Withdrew (WD)
White	Race cancelled (C)
Blank	Did not practice (DNP)
Blank	Did not arrive (DNA)
Blank	Excluded (EX)

**Bold** – Pole
Italics – Fastest Lap
† — Did not finish, but classified

Notes:

- ‡ – Half points were awarded for race 1, as less than 75% of the scheduled distance was completed.

=== Teams' championship ===
For teams entering more than two cars only the two best-finishing cars are eligible to score points in the teams' championship.

Pos.	Team	MNZ (Italy)		IMO (Italy)		NÜR (Germany)		MAG (France)		ZAN (Netherlands)		CAT (Spain)		SPA^{‡} (Belgium)		IMO (Italy)		HOC (Germany)		LEC (France)		Points
Pos.	Team	R1	R2	R1	R2	R1	R2	R1	R2	R1	R2	R1	R2	R1	R2	R1	R2	R1	R2	R1	R2	Points
1	(France) ART Grand Prix	10	**2**	4	4	**1**	**1**	3	**1**	**1**	2	**1**	**1**	**2**	3	5	**1**	2	2	4	2	471.5
1	(France) ART Grand Prix	11	8	14	6	4	2	4	6	7	8	4	12	11	**4**	Ret	7	9	5	7	15	471.5
2	(France) R-ace GP	3	1	2	5	6	4	**1**	2	2	**1**	2	2	7	6	1	10	**1**	6	2	4	351
2	(France) R-ace GP	9	14	Ret	18†	8	11	8	Ret	4	6	15	Ret	13	13	11	Ret	14	Ret	15	6	351
3	(Netherlands) MP Motorsport	1	3	6	7	7	6	13	13	6	3	5	3	1	12	4	2	4	3	3	3	286.5
3	(Netherlands) MP Motorsport	7	6	9	12	14	7	Ret	Ret	14	9	6	6	8	14	6	3	10	12	9	12	286.5
4	(United Kingdom) Arden Motorsport	**2**	13	5	3	12	9	5	5	8	12	3	11	3	1	2	4	3	4	5	5	273.5
4	(United Kingdom) Arden Motorsport	8	Ret	8	8	13	12	7	7	12	13	7	Ret	4	2	7	5	15	8	8	11	273.5
5	(Italy) JD Motorsport	Ret	5	**1**	1	3	8	2	3	3	4	11	4	9	9	8	9	6	7	6	7	261
5	(Italy) JD Motorsport			3	**2**	5	Ret	9	8	11	10	12	8	10	16	Ret	Ret	7	9	11	9	261
6	(Italy) Bhaitech Racing	12	7	7	11	2	5	6	4	9	5	14	9	15	8	**3**	11	5	**1**	**1**	**1**	186
6	(Italy) Bhaitech Racing	13	11	16	14	16	14	11	10	17	15	16	10	16	11	13	15	11	14	18	13	186
7	(Spain) FA Racing	4	9	11	9	9	10	Ret	9	5	7	10	7	6	7	12	13	8	11	13	10	78
7	(Spain) FA Racing	6	Ret	12	10	10	13	DNS	DNS	13	DNS	13	13	12	10	14	14	12	13	16	14	78
8	(Belgium) M2 Competition	5	4	10	Ret																	23
Pos.	Team	R1	R2	R1	R2	R1	R2	R1	R2	R1	R2	R1	R2	R1	R2	R1	R2	R1	R2	R1	R2	Points
Pos.	Team	MNZ (Italy)		IMO (Italy)		NÜR (Germany)		MAG (France)		ZAN (Netherlands)		CAT (Spain)		SPA (Belgium)		IMO (Italy)		HOC (Germany)		LEC (France)		Points

Notes:

- ‡ – Half points were awarded for race 1, as less than 75% of the scheduled distance was completed.
