= Leonard Hoogenboom =

Dutch racing driver (born 2000)

- Nationality: (Netherlands) Dutch
- Born: 14 February 2000 (age 26) Numansdorp, Netherlands
- Categorisation: FIA Silver

Championship titles
- 2019–20 2018: Asian Le Mans Series – LMP2; Le Mans Cup – LMP3

Leonard Hoogenboom (born 14 February 2000) is a Dutch racing driver. He was the 2018 Le Mans Cup champion for DKR Engineering and the 2019–20 Asian Le Mans Series champion for G-Drive Racing with Algarve.

== Career ==
Hoogenboom made his single-seater debut in 2016, racing for Cram Motorsport in the Italian F4 Championship and RS Competition in the ADAC Formula 4 Championship. In the former, he took a best result of third in race three of the second Imola round as he ended the year 23rd in points with three other points finishes. In the latter, Hoogenboom switched to Van Amersfoort Racing from round two onwards, taking his only podium of the season in the second Oschersleben round, helping him round out the season 18th in points.

After taking his only win in single-seater competition in the final Yas Marina round of the 2016–17 Formula 4 UAE Championship for Team Motopark, Hoogenboom remained with the German team for his sophomore season in the ADAC Formula 4 Championship. Hoogenboom scored a best result of seventh in race three at Lausitzring and one other points finish to end the year 21st in the overall standings. During 2017, Hoogenboom also raced for Cram in the Misano and Vallelunga rounds of the Italian F4 Championship. At the end of the year, Hoogenboom participated in the GP3 Series post-season tests at Yas Marina with MP Motorsport.

Despite taking part in the 2018 GP3 pre-season tests at Le Castellet for MP Motorsport, Hoogenboom elected to switch to sportscars for the rest of the year, joining DKR Engineering to compete in the LMP3 class of the Le Mans Cup alongside Jens Petersen. In his rookie season in endurance racing, Hoogenboom started off with wins at Le Castellet and Monza, before winning again at the Red Bull Ring and scoring two other podiums to clinch the title with a race to spare. During 2018, Hoogenboom also raced in the Spa and Hungaroring rounds of the Euroformula Open Championship for RP Motorsport, taking a best result of seventh in race two of the former.

In 2019, Hoogenboom stepped up to LMP2 competition by joining Panis Barthez Compétition to race in the European Le Mans Series. After scoring a best result of seventh at Monza, Hoogenboom left the team ahead of Silverstone. Following that, Hoogenboom spent the rest of the year making select appearances in the Audi Sport Seyffarth R8 LMS Cup and the Supercar Challenge. At the end of the year, Hoogenboom joined G-Drive Racing with Algarve to race in the LMP2 class of the 2019–20 Asian Le Mans Series alongside James French and Roman Rusinov. The trio began the season by winning at Shanghai and Tailem Bend, before finishing third at Sepang and second at Buriram as they clinched the LMP2 title.

For the rest of 2020, Hoogenboom was set to compete with EuroInternational in the LMP3 class of the European Le Mans Series, but ultimately didn't contest any of the five races. Hoogenboom then made a one-off appearance in the Assen round of the 2021 BMW M2 Cup Germany, in which he qualified on pole. Following that, Hoogenboom briefly returned to racing at the Zandvoort round of the 2023 Prototype Cup Germany season for DKR Engineering, in which he took a best result of seventh in race two.

== Karting record ==
=== Karting career summary ===
| Season | Series | Team | Position |
|---|---|---|---|
| 2009 | Dutch Championship — Mini | | 9th |
| 2009–10 | Chrono Rotax Winter Cup — Mini Max | | 17th |
| 2010 | BNL Karting Series — Mini Max | | 16th |
| 2011 | Chrono Dutch RMC — Mini Max | | 12th |
| 2011 | BNL Karting Series — Mini Max | | 13th |
| 2011–12 | Chrono Rotax Winter Cup — Mini Max | | 2nd |
| 2012 | Rotax Winter Series — Mini Max | | 1st |
| 2012 | Chrono Dutch RMC — Mini Max | | 6th |
| 2013 | BNL Karting Series — Rotax Junior | | 7th |
| 2013 | Rotax Max Euro Trophy — Junior Max | Team TKP | 37th |
| 2013 | Rotax International Open — Junior | | 18th |
| 2014 | Rotax Max Winter Cup — Junior Max | Dan Holland Racing | 34th |
| 2014 | Rotax Max Euro Trophy — Junior Max | Dan Holland Racing | 11th |
| 2014 | BNL Karting Series — Rotax Junior | | 14th |
| 2014 | Super One Series — Rotax Junior | | 37th |
| 2015 | Rotax Max Winter Cup — Junior Max | Brand Racing | 4th |
| 2015 | BNL Karting Series — Rotax Senior | | 2nd |
| 2015 | Super One Series — Rotax Max | | 18th |
| 2015 | Rotax Max Euro Trophy — Senior Max | Strawberry Racing; Van Der Pol Racing (Note: Hoogenboom raced for Strawberry Racing in rounds 1–2 and for Van Der Pol Racing in round 4.) | 15th |
| 2015 | RMC Grand Finals — Senior Max | Daems Racing | 14th |
| 2016 | Rotax Wintercup — Senior Max | Team TKP | 12th |

== Racing record ==
=== Racing career summary ===
| Season | Series | Team | Races | Wins | Poles | F/Laps | Podiums | Points | Position |
|---|---|---|---|---|---|---|---|---|---|
| 2016 | Italian F4 Championship | Cram Motorsport | 21 | 0 | 0 | 0 | 1 | 20 | 23rd |
| 2016 | ADAC Formula 4 Championship | RS Competition | 3 | 0 | 0 | 0 | 0 | 25 | 18th |
| 2016 | ADAC Formula 4 Championship | Van Amersfoort Racing | 21 | 0 | 0 | 0 | 1 | 25 | 18th |
| 2016–17 | Formula 4 UAE Championship | Team Motopark 2 | 4 | 1 | 0 | 0 | 1 | 25 | 13th |
| 2017 | Italian F4 Championship | Cram Motorsport | 6 | 0 | 0 | 0 | 0 | 5 | NC |
| 2017 | ADAC Formula 4 Championship | Motopark | 21 | 0 | 0 | 0 | 0 | 10 | 21st |
| 2018 | Le Mans Cup – LMP3 | DKR Engineering | 7 | 3 | 0 | 1 | 5 | 103 | **1st** |
| 2018 | Euroformula Open Championship | RP Motorsport | 4 | 0 | 0 | 0 | 0 | 9 | 18th |
| 2019 | European Le Mans Series – LMP2 | Panis Barthez Compétition | 3 | 0 | 0 | 0 | 0 | 6 | 20th |
| 2019 | Audi Sport Seyffarth R8 LMS Cup | | 4 | 3 | 3 | 3 | 4 | 81 | 13th |
| 2019 | Supercar Challenge – Supersport 2 | DayVTec | 2 | 1 | 0 | 2 | 2 | 43 | 7th |
| 2019–20 | Asian Le Mans Series – LMP2 | G-Drive Racing with Algarve | 4 | 2 | 0 | 0 | 4 | 83 | **1st** |
| 2019–20 | F3 Asian Championship | Absolute Racing | 1 | 0 | 0 | 0 | 0 | 0 | NC |
| 2021 | BMW M2 Cup Germany | Team Project 1 | 2 | 0 | 1 | 0 | 0 | 16 | 21st |
| 2023 | Prototype Cup Germany | DKR Engineering | 2 | 0 | 0 | 0 | 0 | 0 | NC† |

^{†} As Hoogenboom was a guest driver, he was ineligible for championship points.

=== Complete Italian F4 Championship results ===
(key) (Races in bold indicate pole position) (Races in italics indicate fastest lap)

| Year | Team | 1 | 2 | 3 | 4 | 5 | 6 | 7 | 8 | 9 | 10 | 11 | 12 | 13 | 14 | 15 | 16 | 17 | 18 | 19 | 20 | 21 | 22 | 23 | Pos | Points |
|---|---|---|---|---|---|---|---|---|---|---|---|---|---|---|---|---|---|---|---|---|---|---|---|---|---|---|
| 2016 | Cram Motorsport | MIS; 1 | MIS; 2; 19 | MIS; 3 Ret | MIS; 4; 23 | ADR; 1 Ret | ADR; 2; 10 | ADR; 3 | ADR; 4; 16 | IMO1; 1; 24 | IMO1; 2; 13 | IMO1; 3; 30 | MUG; 1; 16 | MUG; 2; 15 | MUG; 3; 14 | VLL; 1; 14 | VLL; 2 Ret | VLL; 3; 17 | IMO2; 1; 11 | IMO2; 2; 9 | IMO2; 3; 3 | MNZ; 1; 17 | MNZ; 2; 8 | MNZ; 3 Ret | 23rd | 20 |
| 2017 | Cram Motorsport | MIS; 1; 8 | MIS; 2; 25 | MIS; 3; 18 | ADR; 1 | ADR; 2 | ADR; 3 | VLL; 1; 10 | VLL; 2; 11 | VLL; 3 Ret | MUG1; 1 | MUG1; 2 | MUG1; 3 | IMO; 1 | IMO; 2 | IMO; 3 | MUG2; 1 | MUG2; 2 | MUG2; 3 | MNZ; 1 | MNZ; 2 | MNZ; 3 | | | NC | 5 |

=== Complete ADAC Formula 4 Championship results ===
(key) (Races in bold indicate pole position) (Races in italics indicate fastest lap)

| Year | Team | 1 | 2 | 3 | 4 | 5 | 6 | 7 | 8 | 9 | 10 | 11 | 12 | 13 | 14 | 15 | 16 | 17 | 18 | 19 | 20 | 21 | 22 | 23 | 24 | Pos | Points |
|---|---|---|---|---|---|---|---|---|---|---|---|---|---|---|---|---|---|---|---|---|---|---|---|---|---|---|---|
| 2016 | RS Competition | OSC1; 1; 13 | OSC1; 2; 23 | OSC1; 3; 13 | | | | | | | | | | | | | | | | | | | | | | 18th | 25 |
| 2016 | Van Amersfoort Racing | | | | SAC; 1; 25 | SAC; 2; 21 | SAC; 3; 25 | LAU; 1; 10 | LAU; 2; 14 | LAU; 3; 12 | OSC2; 1; 9 | OSC2; 2; 12 | OSC2; 3; 2 | RBR; 1; 11 | RBR; 2; 24 | RBR; 3; 8 | NÜR; 1; 16 | NÜR; 2; 17 | NÜR; 3; 11 | ZAN; 1; 25 | ZAN; 2; 28 | ZAN; 3; 23 | HOC; 1; 27 | HOC; 2; 17 | HOC; 3; 15 | 18th | 25 |
| 2017 | Motopark | OSC1; 1; 16 | OSC1; 2; 11 | OSC1; 3; 11 | LAU; 1; 15 | LAU; 2; 8 | LAU; 3; 7 | RBR; 1 Ret | RBR; 2 Ret | RBR; 3 Ret | OSC2; 1; 21 | OSC2; 2; 17 | OSC2; 3; 21 | NÜR; 1; 14 | NÜR; 2; 20 | NÜR; 3; 19 | SAC; 1; 12 | SAC; 2; 12 | SAC; 3 Ret | HOC; 1; 13 | HOC; 2; 15 | HOC; 3; 19 | | | | 21st | 10 |

=== Complete Formula 4 UAE Championship results ===
(key) (Races in bold indicate pole position) (Races in italics indicate fastest lap)

| Year | Team | 1 | 2 | 3 | 4 | 5 | 6 | 7 | 8 | 9 | 10 | 11 | 12 | 13 | 14 | 15 | 16 | 17 | 18 | Pos | Points |
|---|---|---|---|---|---|---|---|---|---|---|---|---|---|---|---|---|---|---|---|---|---|
| 2016-17 | Team Motopark 2 | DUB1; 1 | DUB1; 2 | DUB1; 3 | YMC1; 1 | YMC1; 2 | YMC1; 3 | YMC1; 4 | DUB2; 1 | DUB2; 2 | DUB2; 3 | YMC2; 1 | YMC2; 2 | YMC2; 3 | YMC2; 4 | YMC3; 1; 11 | YMC3; 2; 4 | YMC3; 3; 6 | YMC3; 4; 1 | 13th | 25 |

=== Complete Le Mans Cup results ===
(key) (Races in bold indicate pole position; results in italics indicate fastest lap)

| Year | Entrant | Class | Chassis | 1 | 2 | 3 | 4 | 5 | 6 | 7 | Rank | Points |
|---|---|---|---|---|---|---|---|---|---|---|---|---|
| 2018 | DKR Engineering | LMP3 | Norma M30 | LEC; 1 | MNZ; 1 | LMS; 1; 3 | LMS; 2; 4 | RBR; 1 | SPA; 3 | ALG; Ret | 1st | 103 |

=== Complete Euroformula Open Championship results ===
(key) (Races in bold indicate pole position) (Races in italics indicate fastest lap)

| Year | Entrant | 1 | 2 | 3 | 4 | 5 | 6 | 7 | 8 | 9 | 10 | 11 | 12 | 13 | 14 | 15 | 16 | Pos | Points |
|---|---|---|---|---|---|---|---|---|---|---|---|---|---|---|---|---|---|---|---|
| 2018 | RP Motorsport | EST; 1 | EST; 2 | LEC; 1 | LEC; 2 | SPA; 1; 10 | SPA; 2; 7 | HUN; 1 Ret | HUN; 2; 9 | SIL; 1 | SIL; 2 | MNZ; 1 | MNZ; 2 | JER; 1 | JER; 2 | CAT; 1 | CAT; 2 | 18th | 9 |

=== Complete European Le Mans Series results ===
(key) (Races in bold indicate pole position; results in italics indicate fastest lap)

| Year | Entrant | Class | Chassis | Engine | 1 | 2 | 3 | 4 | 5 | 6 | Rank | Points |
|---|---|---|---|---|---|---|---|---|---|---|---|---|
| 2019 | Panis Barthez Compétition | LMP2 | Ligier JS P217 | Gibson GK428 4.2 L V8 | LEC; Ret | MNZ; 7 | CAT; Ret | SIL | SPA | ALG | 20th | 6 |

=== Complete Asian Le Mans Series results ===
(key) (Races in bold indicate pole position; results in italics indicate fastest lap)

| Year | Entrant | Class | Chassis | Engine | 1 | 2 | 3 | 4 | Rank | Points |
|---|---|---|---|---|---|---|---|---|---|---|
| 2019–20 | G-Drive Racing with Algarve | LMP2 | Aurus 01 | Gibson GK428 4.2 L V8 | SHA; 1 | BEN; 1 | SEP; 3 | CHA; 2 | 1st | 83 |

=== Complete Prototype Cup Germany results ===
(key) (Races in bold indicate pole position) (Races in italics indicate fastest lap)

| Year | Team | Car | Engine | 1 | 2 | 3 | 4 | 5 | 6 | 7 | 8 | 9 | 10 | 11 | 12 | DC | Points |
|---|---|---|---|---|---|---|---|---|---|---|---|---|---|---|---|---|---|
| 2023 | DKR Engineering | Duqueine M30 - D08 | Nissan VK56DE 5.6 L V8 | HOC; 1 | HOC; 2 | OSC; 1 | OSC; 2 | ZAN; 1; 11 | ZAN; 2; 7 | NOR; 1 | NOR; 2 | ASS; 1 | ASS; 2 | NÜR; 1 | NÜR; 2 | NC† | 0† |

^{†} As Hoogenboom was a guest driver, he was ineligible for championship points.
