= Maxime Oosten =

Dutch racing driver (born 2003)

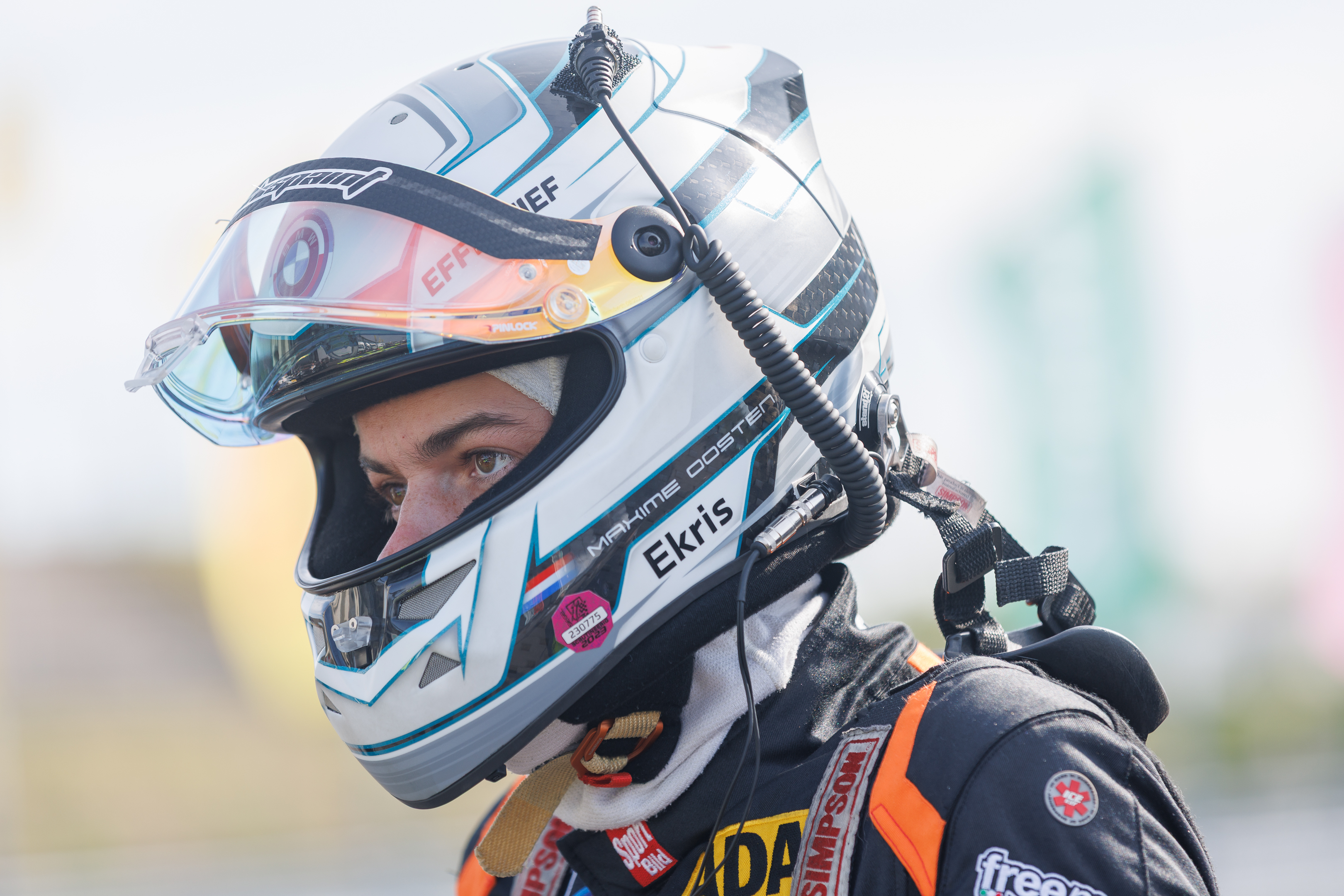
- Oosten in 2024
- Nationality: (Netherlands) Dutch
- Born: 13 November 2003 (age 22) Beetsterzwaag, Netherlands
- Categorisation: FIA Silver

Championship titles
- 2025–2026 2022 2022 2019 2019: GT World Challenge Asia – Silver-Am; BMW M2 Cup Germany; BMW M2 Cup Benelux; Dutch Supercar Challenge - Supersport 2 Mazda MX-5 Cup Netherlands - Junior Cup

Maxime Oosten (born 13 November 2003 in Beetsterzwaag) is a Dutch racing driver who last competed in GT World Challenge Asia for GTO Racing Team KRC and HRT Ford Racing in the GT World Challenge Europe Endurance Cup. He is the 2022 BMW M2 Cup Germany champion.

== Early career ==
Following two years in karting, Oosten stepped up to the Mazda MX-5 Cup Netherlands and the Dutch Supercar Challenge in 2019. As the youngest driver in both championships, Oosten became Junior class champion in the former and Supersport 2 champion in the latter.

Oosten returned to Mazda MX-5 Cup Netherlands for his sophomore season in 2020, finishing third in the overall standings. In August of that year, Oosten made his Porsche Supercup debut with Bas Koeten Racing. Following a test at Vallelunga organized by Lamborghini's Giorgio Sanna, Oosten was included in Lamborghini's Young Driver Programme for 2021. One month after the announcement, Oosten made his Lamborghini Super Trofeo Europe debut in the final round at Paul Ricard.

For the 2021 season, Oosten returned to Johan Kraan Motorsports to compete on a full-time basis in Lamborghini Super Trofeo Europe. After finishing second in the season opening race at Monza, Oosten moved to Bonaldi Motorsport for the following round at Paul Ricard. In the following round at Zandvoort, Oosten scored his second podium of the season by finishing second in race one. After scoring further podiums at Spa-Francorchamps and Nürburgring, Oosten finished fourth in the standings.

Having made a part-time campaign in the BMW M2 Cup Germany the year prior, Oosten returned to the championship in 2022, racing on a full-time basis. He won eight races on his way to the title. He also won the BMW M2 CS Racing Cup Benelux, becoming the first driver to win in two BMW M2 championships in the same year. During the year, Oosten made his GT3 debut, racing in the 2022 24 Hours of Spa with Samantha Tan Racing. Despite a diffuser problem during the race, Oosten finished ninth in the Silver class. As a reward for winning the BMW M2 Cup Germany, Oosten participated in the FIA World Endurance Championship rookie test in Bahrain for Team Project 1, where he set the fastest time in LMGTE Am during the morning session.

== GT career ==
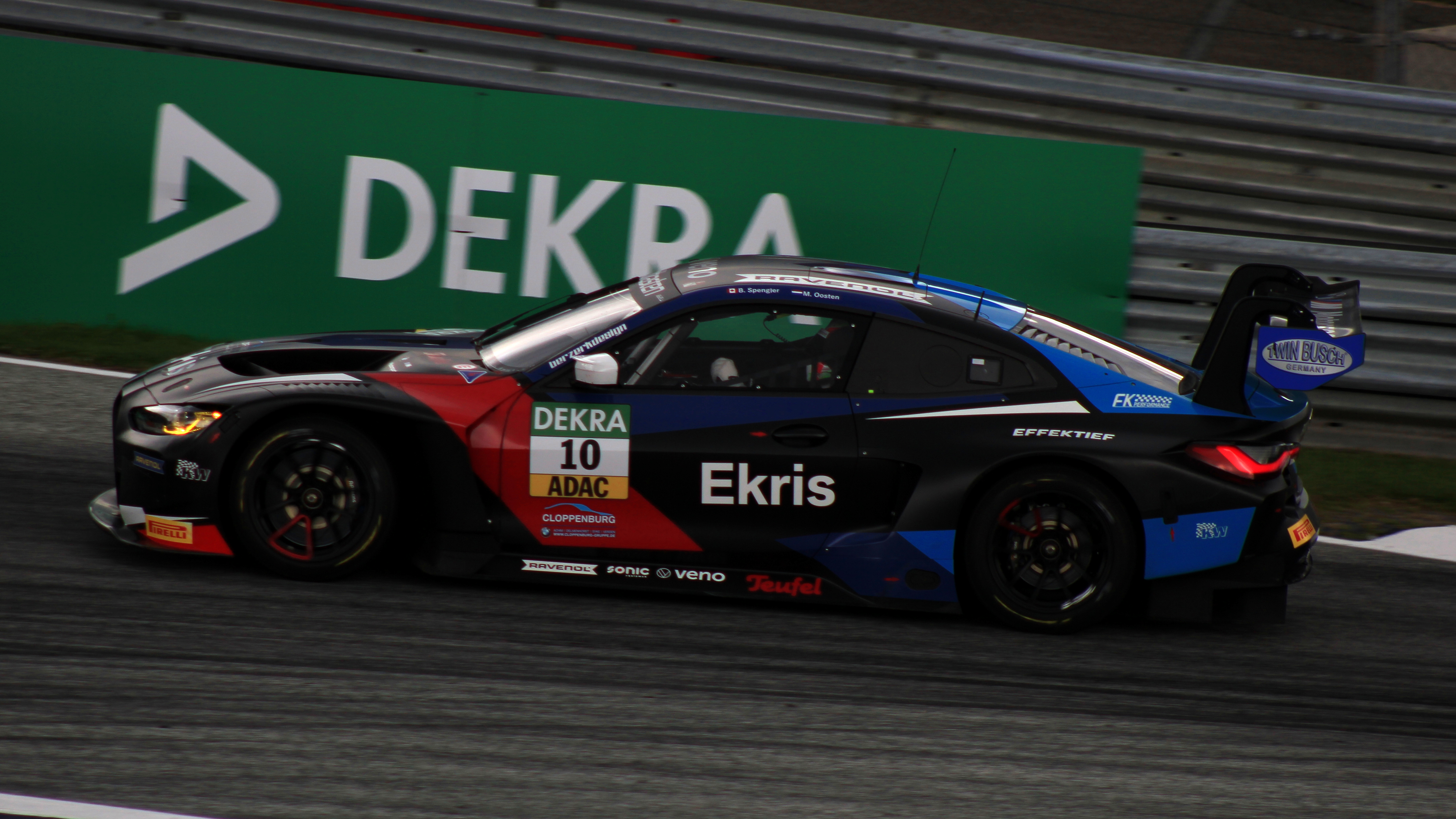
Oosten at the Red Bull Ring round of the 2023 ADAC GT Masters season

Oosten continued with Team Project 1, stepping up to ADAC GT4 Germany for 2023. He scored two podiums, both being second-place finishes, and ended the season 15th in the standings. In September, it was announced that Oosten would make his ADAC GT Masters debut in the Red Bull Ring round. Racing alongside Bruno Spengler, the pair finished third on debut, but were later promoted to first after the top-two was disqualified. At the end of the year, Oosten made his Asian Le Mans Series debut with Project 1 in the GT class.

In early 2024, it was announced that Oosten would join FK Performance Motorsport alongside Leon Köhler for that year's ADAC GT Masters. The Dutchman started off the season with a pole and a win at Oschersleben. After finishing no lower than fifth in the next two races, Oosten won race two at Zandvoort. Following two podiums at the Nürburgring and a fourth-place finish in race one at Spa, Oosten took his third win of the season in race two to stay in the title fight. Taking two more podiums at the Red Bull Ring and Hockenheimring, Oosten finished his maiden ADAC GT Masters season as runner-up in the standings. Ahead of the Fuji round of the GT World Challenge Asia championship, Oosten joined Team KRC for the final four rounds of that season. He scored four class podiums, with a best finish of fifth overall in the second race at Suzuka. Before the 3 Hours of Monza, it was announced that Oosten would join Robin Frijns and Marco Wittmann on his GT World Challenge Europe Endurance Cup debut. However, in qualifying, the Dutchman crashed in the second round of qualifying and the car was withdrawn from the race.

The following year, Oosten joined Paradine Competition to compete in the GT World Challenge Europe Sprint Cup, as well as remaining with Team KRC to race in GT World Challenge Asia. In the former, Oosten scored four Silver Cup podiums to end the season fourth in points, whereas in the latter, Oosten scored three overall podiums and five class wins to secure the Silver-Am title at the end of the year. During 2025, Oosten also raced for Paradine in the 24 Hours of Spa.

In 2026, Oosten remained with Team KRC to remain in GT World Challenge Asia, as well as joining HRT Ford Racing to return to the GT World Challenge Europe Endurance Cup. In GTWC Asia, Oosten scored a lone overall podium at Okayama, as well as six class wins en route to his second consecutive Silver-Am title. During 2026, Oosten also took an SP9 Pro podium at NLS7 on his class debut for FK Performance Motorsport.

== Personal life ==
Oosten is the son of Veno Wood Flooring founder and amateur race car driver Hielke Oosten. He is one of the tallest drivers in racing, at 1.98 m (6 ft 6 in).

== Racing record ==
=== Racing career summary ===
Season	Series	Team	Races	Wins	Poles	F/Laps	Podiums	Points	Position
2019	BMW Continent Cup - Zilhouettes and DTC								
2019	Mazda MX-5 Cup Netherlands - Junior Cup	Johan Kraan Motorsport	12	3	1	2	8	194	**1st**
2019	Supercar Challenge - Supersport 2	Veno Racing	14	7	??	??	13	281	**1st**
2020	Mazda MX-5 Cup Netherlands		9	1	0	1	5	131	**3rd**
2020	Porsche Supercup	Bas Koeten Racing Team	1	0	0	0	0	0	NC†
2020	Lamborghini Super Trofeo Europe – Pro	Johan Kraan Motorsport	2	0	0	0	0	0	NC
2021	VRM BMW M2 Cup Powered by Hankook	Bas Koeten Racing Team	10	1	1	??	4	117	**3rd**
2021	BMW M2 Cup Germany	Project 1	??	??	??	??	??	53	11th
2021	Lamborghini Super Trofeo Europe – Pro	Johan Kraan Motorsport	2	0	0	0	1	75	5th
2021	Lamborghini Super Trofeo Europe – Pro	Bonaldi Motorsport	8	0	0	0	3	75	5th
2022	Dutch Winter Endurance Series								
2022	BMW M2 Cup Benelux	Bas Koeten Racing	12	11	??	??	11	257	**1st**
2022	BMW M2 Cup Germany	Project 1	??	??	??	??	??	214	**1st**
2022	GT World Challenge Europe Endurance Cup	ST Racing	1	0	0	0	0	0	NC
2022	GT World Challenge Europe Endurance Cup - Silver	ST Racing	1	0	0	0	0	2	29th
2022	Nürburgring Langstrecken-Serie - SP 10	Four Motors Bioconcept-Car	2	0	0	0	0	0	NC
2023	ADAC GT4 Germany	Project 1	12	0	0	0	2	53	15th
2023	ADAC GT Masters	FK Performance Motorsport	2	1	0	1	1	31	20th
2023	24 Hours of Nürburgring - SP 10	FK Performance Motorsport	1	1	0	0	1	N/A	**1st**
2023	Nürburgring Langstrecken-Serie - SP 10	FK Performance Motorsport	1	0	0	0	0	0	NC
2023	Nürburgring Langstrecken-Serie - AT(-G)	Four Motors Bioconcept-Car	1	0	0	0	1	0	NC
2023–24	Asian Le Mans Series - GT3	Team Project 1	2	0	0	0	0	0	36th
2024	ADAC GT Masters	FK Performance Motorsport	12	3	1	3	6	205	**2nd**
2024	ADAC GT4 Germany	FK Performance Motorsport	2	0	0	0	0	7	24th
2024	24 Hours of Nürburgring - SP 10	FK Performance Motorsport	1	1	0	0	1	N/A	**1st**
2024	GT World Challenge Asia	Team KRC	8	0	0	0	0	19	30th
2024	GT World Challenge Asia - Silver-Am	Team KRC	8	0	0	0	4	94	10th
2024	GT World Challenge Europe Endurance Cup	ROWE Racing	0	0	0	0	0	0	NC
2024	Supercar Challenge – Supersport	AKG Motorsport	7	0	3	?	2	72	9th
2025	GT World Challenge Asia	Team KRC	12	0	0	0	3	92	5th
2025	GT World Challenge Asia - Silver-Am	Team KRC	12	5	2	0	10	230	**1st**
2025	GT World Challenge Europe Sprint Cup	Paradine Competition	10	0	0	0	0	6	21st
2025	GT World Challenge Europe Sprint Cup	Paradine Competition	10	0	0	1	4	76	4th
2025	GT World Challenge Europe Endurance Cup	Paradine Competition	1	0	0	0	0	0	NC
2025	GT World Challenge Europe Endurance Cup - Silver	Paradine Competition	1	0	0	0	0	8	34th
2025	Intercontinental GT Challenge	Paradine Competition; Team KRC	2	0	0	0	0	4	30th
2025	Supercar Challenge - Supersport+	Bas Koeten Racing	7	3	0	?	6	131	**3rd**
2026	Intercontinental GT Challenge	GTO with KRC	1	0	0	0	0	12	24th
2026	Intercontinental GT Challenge	HRT Ford Racing	1	0	0	0	0	12	24th
2026	Intercontinental GT Challenge	Team KRC	1	0	0	0	0	12	24th
2026	GT World Challenge Asia	GTO with KRC	12	0	0	0	1	41	16th
2026	GT World Challenge Asia – Silver-Am	GTO with KRC	12	6	2	0	10	223	**1st**
2026	GT World Challenge Europe Endurance Cup	HRT Ford Racing	4	0	0	0	0	0	NC
2026	GT World Challenge Europe Endurance Cup – Silver	HRT Ford Racing	4	0	0	0	0	41	8th
2026	Nürburgring Langstrecken-Serie – BMW M2 Racing	Ravenol Motorsport							
2026	Nürburgring Langstrecken-Serie – SP9 Pro	FK Performance Motorsport	1	0	0	0	1	5	NC

=== Complete Porsche Supercup results ===
(key) (Races in bold indicate pole position) (Races in italics indicate fastest lap)

Year	Team	1	2	3	4	5	6	7	8	Pos.	Points
2020	Bas Koeten Racing Team	RBR	RBR	HUN	SIL	SIL	CAT	SPA; 18	MNZ	NC†	0

^{†} As Oosten was a guest driver, he was ineligible to score points.

=== Complete GT World Challenge Europe results ===
==== GT World Challenge Europe Endurance Cup ====
(Races in bold indicate pole position) (Races in italics indicate fastest lap)

Year	Team	Car	Class	1	2	3	4	5	6	7	Pos.	Points
2022	ST Racing	BMW M4 GT3	Silver	IMO	LEC	SPA; 6H; 57	SPA; 12H; 48	SPA; 24H; 36	HOC	CAT	29th	2
2024	ROWE Racing	BMW M4 GT3	Pro	LEC	SPA; 6H	SPA; 12H	SPA; 24H	NÜR	MNZ; WD	JED	NC	0
2025	Paradine Competition	BMW M4 GT3 Evo	Silver	LEC	MNZ	SPA; 6H; 34	SPA; 12H; 27	SPA; 24H; Ret	NÜR	CAT	34th	8
2026	HRT Ford Racing	Ford Mustang GT3 Evo	Silver	LEC; 26	**MNZ**; Ret	SPA; 6H; 37	SPA; 12H; 19	SPA; 24H; 18	NÜR	ALG; 20	8th	41

==== Complete GT World Challenge Europe Sprint Cup results ====
Year	Team	Car	Class	1	2	3	4	5	6	7	8	9	10	Pos.	Points
2025	Paradine Competition	BMW M4 GT3 Evo	Silver	BRH; 1; 12	BRH; 2; 17	ZAN; 1; 22	ZAN; 2; 7	MIS; 1; 24	MIS; 2; 18	MAG; 1; 17	MAG; 2; 19	VAL; 1; 13	VAL; 2; 7	4th	76

=== Complete ADAC GT4 Germany results ===
(key) (Races in bold indicate pole position) (Races in italics indicate fastest lap)

Year	Team	Car	1	2	3	4	5	6	7	8	9	10	11	12	DC	Points
2023	Project 1	BMW M4 GT4	OSC; 1; 10	OSC; 2; 2	ZAN; 1 Ret	ZAN; 2; 22	NÜR; 1; 26	NÜR; 2; 24	LAU; 1; 2	LAU; 2; 9	SAC; 1 Ret	SAC; 2; 24	HOC; 1 DSQ	HOC; 2 Ret	15th	53
2024	FK Performance Motorsport	BMW M4 GT4	OSC; 1	OSC; 2	LAU; 1	LAU; 2	NOR; 1	NOR; 2	NÜR; 1; 19	NÜR; 2; 9	RBR; 1	RBR; 2	HOC; 1	HOC; 2	24th	7

=== Complete ADAC GT Masters results ===
(key) (Races in bold indicate pole position) (Races in italics indicate fastest lap)

Year	Team	Car	1	2	3	4	5	6	7	8	9	10	11	12	DC	Points
2023	FK Performance Motorsport	BMW M4 GT3	HOC; 1	HOC; 2	NOR; 1	NOR; 2	NÜR; 1	NÜR; 2	SAC; 1	SAC; 2	RBR; 1; 1	RBR; 2; 10	HOC; 1	HOC; 2	20th	31
2024	FK Performance Motorsport	BMW M4 GT3	**OSC**; **1**; 1^{1}	OSC; 2; 4	ZAN; 1; 5	ZAN; 2; 1	NÜR; 1; 4	NÜR; 2; 3	SPA; 1; 4	SPA; 2; 1	RBR; 1; 5	RBR; 2; 3^{3}	HOC; 1; 9	HOC; 2; 2	2nd	205

=== Complete Asian Le Mans Series results ===
Year	Entrant	Class	Chassis	Engine	1	2	3	4	5	Rank	Points
2023–24	Team Project 1	GT	BMW M4 GT3	BMW P58 3.0 L Turbo I6	SEP; 1; 20	SEP; 2; 18	DUB; 1	ABU; 1	ABU; 2	36th	0

=== Complete GT World Challenge Asia results ===
(key) (Races in bold indicate pole position) (Races in italics indicate fastest lap)

Year	Team	Car	Class	1	2	3	4	5	6	7	8	9	10	11	12	DC	Points
2024	Team KRC	BMW M4 GT3	Silver-Am	SEP; 1	SEP; 2	BUR; 1	BUR; 2	FUJ; 1; 3	FUJ; 2 Ret	SUZ; 1; 4	SUZ; 2; 2	OKA; 1; 4	OKA; 2; 8	SHA; 1; 3	SHA; 2; 2	10th	94
2025	Team KRC	BMW M4 GT3 Evo	Silver-Am	SEP; 1; 1	**SEP**; **2**; 1	MAN; 1; 1	MAN; 2; 1	BUR; 1; 2	**BUR**; **2**; 1	FUJ; 1; 3	FUJ; 2; 7	OKA; 1; 4	OKA; 2; 2	BEI; 1; 2	BEI; 2; 2	1st	230
2026	GTO with KRC	BMW M4 GT3 Evo	Silver-Am	SEP; 1; 5	**SEP**; **2**; 1	MAN; 1 Ret	MAN; 2; 3	FUJ; 1; 1	FUJ; 2; 1	OKA; 1; 1	**OKA**; **2**; 1	BEI; 1; 3	BEI; 2; 1	SHA; 1; 3	SHA; 2; 2	1st	223
