= 2019 Supercar Challenge =

Car racing competition

The 2019 Supercar Challenge powered by Hankook was the nineteenth Supercar Challenge season since it replaced the Supercar Cup in 2001. It began at Magny-Cours on April 19 and ended at TT Circuit Assen on October 20.

== Calendar ==
| Round | Circuit | Date | Classes | Event | Notes |
|---|---|---|---|---|---|
| 1 | Magny-Cours, France | 19–21 April | CN, SR3, GT, SS1, SS2 and Sports division. | | All of the present classes race combined. |
| 2 | Circuit Zolder, Belgium | 31 May-2 June | All | Attic Superprix | SS1, SS2 and Sport divisions raced separate from GT and GT & Prototypes. |
| 3 | Circuit de Spa-Francorchamps, Belgium | 21–23 June | All | Spa Euro Races | All of the present classes race combined. |
| 4 | Circuit Zandvoort, Netherlands | 12–14 July | GT, SS1, SS2 and Sport division. | Blancpain GT World Challenge Europe | All of the present classes race combined. |
| 5 | TT Circuit Assen, Netherlands | 16–18 August | GT, SS1, SS2 and Sports division. | Gamma Racing Day | All of the present classes race combined. |
| 6 | Circuit de Spa-Francorchamps, Belgium | 4–6 October | LMP3, SR3, GT, SS1, SS2 and Sports division. | TCR Spa 500 | All of the present classes race combined. |
| 7 | TT Circuit Assen, Netherlands | 18–20 October | All | Racing Festival Spa | SS1, SS2 and Sport divisions raced separate from GT and GT & Prototypes. |

== Entry list ==
| Team | Car | No. | Drivers | Class | Rounds |
|---|---|---|---|---|---|
| (Netherlands) Cor Euser Racing | Marcos Mantis GT3 | 100 | (Netherlands) Cor Euser | GT | 7 |
| (Netherlands) Cor Euser Racing | MARC II V8 | 117 | (Netherlands) Cor Euser | GT | 5 |
| (Netherlands) Boda Racing | Porsche 991 GT3 Cup II | 102 | (Netherlands) Bob Herber | GT | 1–3 |
| (Belgium) Speedlover | Porsche 991 GT3 Cup II | 103 | (Belgium) John de Wilde | GT | All |
| (Belgium) Speedlover | Porsche 991 GT3 Cup II | 133 | (Belgium) Jean-Pierre Verhoeven | GT | 6 |
| (Belgium) Speedlover | Porsche 991 GT3 Cup II | 133 | (Netherlands) Jaxon Verhoeven | GT | 6 |
| (Belgium) Speedlover | Porsche 991 GT3 Cup II | 150 | (Belgium) Pierre-Yves Paque | GT | 3 |
| (Belgium) Speedlover | Porsche 991 GT3 Cup II | 150 | (Belgium) Gregory Paisse | GT | 3 |
| (Belgium) JR Motorsport | BMW M4 Silhouette | 105 | (Belgium) Ward Sluys | GT | 2–3, 6–7 |
| (Belgium) JR Motorsport | BMW M4 Silhouette | 105 | (Lithuania) Justas Jonušis | GT | 6 |
| (Belgium) JR Motorsport | BMW M4 Silhouette | 105 | (Netherlands) Sandra van der Sloot | GT | 7 |
| (Netherlands) Johan Kraan Motorsport | Lamborghini Huracán Super Trofeo Evo | 107 | (Netherlands) Max Weering | GT | All |
| (Netherlands) Johan Kraan Motorsport | Saker GT | 305 | (United Kingdom) Robin Greenhalgh | SS2 | 1, 3–5 |
| (Netherlands) Johan Kraan Motorsport | Saker GT | 305 | (Germany) Jerome Greenhalgh | SS2 | 1, 3–5 |
| (Netherlands) MDM Motorsport | Porsche 991 GT3 Cup II | 109 | (Netherlands) Hendrik Hoeffner | GT | 3 |
| (Belgium) EMG Motorsport | Porsche 991 GT3 Cup II | 111 | (Belgium) Filip Teunkens | GT | 7 |
| (Belgium) EMG Motorsport | Porsche 991 GT3 Cup II | 111 | (Belgium) Nicolas van Dierendonck | GT | 7 |
| (Netherlands) Certainty Racing Team | Porsche 991 GT3 Cup II | 115 | (Netherlands) Floris Dullaart | GT | 3–5 |
| (Netherlands) Certainty Racing Team | BMW M3 E36 | 377 | (Netherlands) Dennis van der Linden | SS2 | 6 |
| (Netherlands) Certainty Racing Team | BMW 1 Series GTR | 384 | (Netherlands) Rudy Sluiter | SS2 | 6 |
| (Netherlands) Certainty Racing Team | Renault Clio IV | 409 | (Netherlands) Dillon Koster | Sport | 7 |
| (Netherlands) Certainty Racing Team | Renault Clio IV | 409 | (Netherlands) Martin de Kleijn | Sport | 7 |
| (Netherlands) Certainty Racing Team | Renault Clio IV | 410 | (Netherlands) Dillon Koster | Sport | 2–7 |
| (Netherlands) Certainty Racing Team | Renault Clio IV | 410 | (Netherlands) Tim Schulte | Sport | 2–7 |
| (Denmark) Bergmann Motorsport | Porsche 991 GT3 Cup II | 119 | (Denmark) Chris Bergmann | GT | 3, 5 |
| (Denmark) Bergmann Motorsport | Porsche 991 GT3 Cup II | 119 | (Denmark) Michael Bergmann | GT | 3, 5 |
| (Netherlands) Dick Freebird | Porsche 991 GT3 Cup II | 121 | (Netherlands) Dick Freebird | GT | 5 |
| (Belgium) JJ Racing | Porsche 991 GT3 Cup II | 126 | (Belgium) Jos Jansen | GT | All |
| (Switzerland) Itris Racing Team | Porsche 991 GT3 Cup II | 127 | (Switzerland) Alfred Winkler | GT | 3 |
| (Switzerland) Itris Racing Team | Porsche 991 GT3 Cup II | 128 | (Switzerland) Thomas Winkler | GT | 3 |
| (Switzerland) Itris Racing Team | Porsche 991 GT3 Cup II | 129 | (Switzerland) Thomas Pfister | GT | 3 |
| (Netherlands) JW Race Service | Porsche 991 GT3 Cup I | 140 | (Netherlands) Huub van Eijndhoven | GT | 6–7 |
| (Netherlands) JW Race Service | BMW 1M E82 | 340 | (Netherlands) Lucas van Eijndhoven | SS2 | 6 |
| (Netherlands) RaceArt | Porsche 991 GT3 Cup II | 188 | (Netherlands) Roger Grouwels | GT | 5 |
| (Netherlands) Moritz Racing | Marcos Mantis GT3 | 199 | (Netherlands) Bert Moritz | GT | 6 |
| (Netherlands) Moritz Racing | Marcos Mantis GT3 | 199 | (Netherlands) Patrick Moritz | GT | 6 |
| (Netherlands) FEBO Racing Team | CUPRA León TCR | 201 | (Netherlands) Dennis de Borst | SS1 | All |
| (Netherlands) FEBO Racing Team | CUPRA León TCR | 201 | (Netherlands) Stan van Oord | SS1 | All |
| (Netherlands) Ferry Monster Autosport (Note: Cars no. 202, 210 and 266 were entered as Ferry Monster Autosport and car no. 264 was entered as DK-Racing powered by FMA.) (Netherlands) DK-Racing powered by FMA | SEAT León TCR | 202 | (Netherlands) René Steenmetz | SS1 | 2–7 |
| (Netherlands) Ferry Monster Autosport (Netherlands) DK-Racing powered by FMA | SEAT León TCR | 202 | (Netherlands) Stephen Polderman | SS1 | 2–4, 6–7 |
| (Netherlands) Ferry Monster Autosport (Netherlands) DK-Racing powered by FMA | SEAT León TCR | 210 | (Netherlands) Lorenzo van Riet | SS1 | All |
| (Netherlands) Ferry Monster Autosport (Netherlands) DK-Racing powered by FMA | SEAT León TCR | 210 | (Netherlands) Thijmen Nabuurs | SS1 | All |
| (Netherlands) Ferry Monster Autosport (Netherlands) DK-Racing powered by FMA | Volkswagen Golf GTI TCR | 264 | (Netherlands) Martin Huisman | SS1 | All |
| (Netherlands) Ferry Monster Autosport (Netherlands) DK-Racing powered by FMA | Volkswagen Golf GTI TCR | 264 | (Belgium) Jonas de Kimpe | SS1 | All |
| (Netherlands) Ferry Monster Autosport (Netherlands) DK-Racing powered by FMA | CUPRA León TCR | 266 | (Netherlands) Max Veels | SS1 | All |
| (Netherlands) Ferry Monster Autosport (Netherlands) DK-Racing powered by FMA | CUPRA León TCR | 266 | (Netherlands) Jack van der Ende | SS1 | All |
| (Netherlands) Vijfschaft Racing Team | CUPRA León TCR | 206 | (Netherlands) Tony Vijfschaft | SS1 | 5 |
| (Netherlands) JR Motorsport | BMW M3 E92 V8 | 208 | (Netherlands) Ted van Vliet | SS1 | 2–7 |
| (Netherlands) JR Motorsport | BMW M3 E92 V8 | 208 | (Netherlands) Bert van der Zweerde | SS1 | 7 |
| (Netherlands) Blueberry Raving | BMW M3 E46 | 222 | (Netherlands) Luuk van Loon | SS1 | 1–3, 5–7 |
| (Netherlands) Blueberry Raving | BMW M3 E46 | 222 | (Netherlands) Ronald van Loon | SS1 | 1–3, 5–7 |
| (Netherlands) Blueberry Raving | Mazda MX-5 | 427 | (Netherlands) Dick van Elk | Sport | 1, 3 |
| (Netherlands) Kool Racing | Honda Civic Type R TCR (FK2) | 232 | (Netherlands) Martijn Kool | SS1 | 6 |
| (Netherlands) Kool Racing | Honda Civic Type R TCR (FK2) | 232 | (Netherlands) Piet de Gier | SS1 | 6 |
| (Spain) E2P Escuela Española de Pilotos | Ginetta G50 GT4 | 244 | (Greece) Kosta Kanaroglou | SS1 | 6 |
| (Netherlands) Harders Plaza Racing | BMW 132 GTR | 245 | (Netherlands) Benjamin van den Berg | SS1 | 1–3 |
| (Netherlands) Harders Plaza Racing | BMW 132 GTR | 245 | (Netherlands) Robert van den Berg | SS1 | 1–3 |
| (Netherlands) Euro Autosport Foundation | BMW M3 E92 V8 | 246 | (Netherlands) Ruud Olij | SS1 | 2–6 |
| (Austria) Trencar Racing | KTM X-Bow | 247 | (Austria) Bob Bau | SS1 | 2, 5–6 |
| (Netherlands) Bas Koeten Racing | Audi RS3 LMS TCR | 250 | (Netherlands) Oscar Graper | SS1 | 3–5, 7 |
| (Netherlands) Bas Koeten Racing | Audi RS3 LMS TCR | 250 | (Netherlands) Bas Schouten | SS1 | 7 |
| (Netherlands) BS Racing Team | BMW M3 E46 GTR | 259 | (Netherlands) Marcel van de Maat | SS1 | 1–5, 7 |
| (Netherlands) BS Racing Team | BMW M3 E46 GTR | 259 | (Netherlands) Peter Schreurs | SS1 | 7 |
| (Netherlands) Van der Kooi Racing | Lotus Exige V6 | 262 | (Netherlands) Roelant de Waard | SS1 | 3 |
| (Netherlands) Veno Racing | Porsche 997 GT3 Cup | 299 | (Netherlands) Pascal Teekens | SS1 | 3, 5 |
| (Netherlands) Veno Racing | Porsche 997 GT3 Cup | 299 | (Netherlands) Hielke Oosten | SS1 | 3, 5 |
| (Netherlands) Veno Racing | BMW Z4 Silhouette | 303 | (Netherlands) Milan Teekens | SS2 | All |
| (Netherlands) Veno Racing | BMW Z4 Silhouette | 303 | (Netherlands) Maxime Oosten | SS2 | All |
| (Netherlands) MWR Racing | BMW M3 E36 | 306 | (Netherlands) Remco de Beus | SS2 | All |
| (Netherlands) R Racing | SEAT León Supercopa | 307 | (Netherlands) Jim Ringelberg | SS2 | 1 |
| (Netherlands) Koopman Racing | BMW Compact GTR | 351 | (Netherlands) Peter Koelewijn | SS2 | 5 |
| (Netherlands) Koopman Racing | BMW M3 E36 | 351 | (Netherlands) Peter Koelewijn | SS2 | 6 |
| (Netherlands) Koopman Racing | BMW 1 Series GTR | 352 | (Netherlands) Bart Arendsen | SS2 | 5–6 |
| (Netherlands) Koopman Racing | BMW 1 Series GTR | 352 | (Netherlands) Joop Arendsen | SS2 | 6 |
| (Netherlands) Koopman Racing | SEAT León Supercopa | 353 | (Netherlands) Berry Arendsen | SS2 | 5–6 |
| (Netherlands) Koopman Racing | BMW M3 E46 GTR | 372 | (Netherlands) Frank Broersen | SS2 | 6 |
| (Netherlands) Koopman Racing | BMW M3 E46 GTR | 373 | (Belgium) Sjef Jansen | SS2 | 6 |
| (Ukraine) Emoji Racing Team | BMW M3 E46 Compact | 360 | (Ukraine) Borys Karhin | SS2 | 5 |
| (Ukraine) Emoji Racing Team | BMW M3 E46 Compact | 360 | (Ukraine) Maksim Pashko | SS2 | 5 |
| (Ukraine) Emoji Racing Team | BMW M3 E46 Compact | 560 | (Ukraine) Borys Karhin | S2 | 6 |
| (Ukraine) Emoji Racing Team | BMW M3 E46 Compact | 560 | (Ukraine) Maksim Pashko | S2 | 6 |
| (Netherlands) Zilhouette Cup | BMW Z4 Zilhouette | 361 | (Netherlands) Sam de Lange | SS2 | 5 |
| (Netherlands) Zilhouette Cup | BMW Z4 Zilhouette | 362 | (Netherlands) Mark Wieringa | SS2 | 5 |
| (Netherlands) Zilhouette Cup | BMW Z4 Zilhouette | 363 | (Netherlands) Jan Berry Drenth | SS2 | 5 |
| (Netherlands) Zilhouette Cup | BMW Z4 Zilhouette | 364 | (Netherlands) Bernard Blaak | SS2 | 5, 7 |
| (Netherlands) Zilhouette Cup | BMW Z4 Zilhouette | 367 | (Netherlands) Marcel van der Lyke | SS2 | 5 |
| (Netherlands) Zilhouette Cup | BMW Z4 Zilhouette | 369 | (Netherlands) Paul Bloembergen | SS2 | 5 |
| (Netherlands) Zilhouette Cup | BMW Z4 Zilhouette | 370 | (Netherlands) Wolter Zijlstra | SS2 | 5 |
| (Netherlands) DayVTec | BMW M2 | 378 | (Netherlands) Alexander Berger | SS2 | 6 |
| (Netherlands) DayVTec | BMW M2 | 379 | (Netherlands) Cas Renders | SS2 | 6 |
| (Netherlands) DayVTec | BMW M2 | 380 | (Netherlands) Tom van der Zwet | SS2 | 6 |
| (Netherlands) DayVTec | BMW M2 | 381 | (Netherlands) Jan Willem van Stee | SS2 | 6 |
| (Netherlands) DayVTec | BMW M2 | 382 | (Netherlands) André Seinen | SS2 | 6 |
| (Netherlands) DayVTec | BMW M2 | 383 | (Netherlands) Leonard Hoogenboom | SS2 | 6 |
| (Belgium) Why Not Racing | Peugeot 308 Racing Cup | 381 | (Belgium) Nicolas Delencre | SS2 | 1–2 |
| (Belgium) Traxx Racing Team | Peugeot RCZ Cup | 401 | (Belgium) Chris Voet | Sport | All |
| (Belgium) Traxx Racing Team | Peugeot RCZ Cup | 401 | (Belgium) Bart van den Broeck | Sport | All |
| (Netherlands) Spirit Racing | Renault Clio 3 | 402 | (Netherlands) Rob Nieman | Sport | All |
| (Netherlands) Spirit Racing | Renault Clio 1.6 Turbo | 404 | (Netherlands) Bart Drost | Sport | 2 |
| (Netherlands) Spirit Racing | Renault Clio 1.6 Turbo | 408 | (Netherlands) Priscilla Speelman | Sport | 5, 7 |
| (Netherlands) Spirit Racing | Renault Clio 1.6 Turbo | 499 | (Netherlands) Sandra van der Sloot | Sport | 2–7 |
| (Netherlands) Spirit Racing | Renault Clio 1.6 Turbo | 499 | (Netherlands) John van der Voort | Sport | 2–4, 6–7 |
| (Netherlands) Spirit Racing | Renault Clio 1.6 Turbo | 499 | (Netherlands) Bart Drost | Sport | 5 |
| (Netherlands) Racing Team Tappel | BMW Z4 Zilhouette | 403 | (Netherlands) Henk Tappel | Sport | 1–5, 7 |
| (Netherlands) Racing Team Tappel | BMW Z4 Zilhouette | 403 | (Netherlands) Harold Wisselink | Sport | 4 |
| (Netherlands) JS Racing | BMW E46 Compact | 411 | (Belgium) Jean-Pierre Verhoeven | Sport | 7 |
| (Netherlands) JS Racing | BMW E46 Compact | 571 | (Belgium) Jean-Pierre Verhoeven | S2 | 6 |
| (Netherlands) JS Racing | BMW E46 Compact | 571 | (Netherlands) Jaxon Verhoeven | S2 | 6 |
| (Netherlands) Wagtmans Racing | Ford Focus Zilhouette | 412 | (Netherlands) Danny Wagtmans | Sport | 1–2, 4–5, 7 |
| (Netherlands) Eljax Racing | BMW E46 Compact | 425 | (Netherlands) Estella van der Wiel | Sport | 1–2 |
| (Netherlands) Eljax Racing | BMW E46 Compact | 425 | (Netherlands) Jaxon Verhoeven | Sport | 1–2 |
| (Netherlands) Forze Hydrogen Electric Racing | Forze VIII | 444 | (Netherlands) Jan Bot | Sport | 4 |
| (Netherlands) Forze Hydrogen Electric Racing | Forze VIII | 444 | (Netherlands) Leo van der Eijk | Sport | 5 |
| (Netherlands) Team Kolenaar de Bekker | Mazda MX-5 | 505 | (Netherlands) Han Kolenaar | S2 | 6 |
| (Netherlands) Team Kolenaar de Bekker | Mazda MX-5 | 505 | (Netherlands) Emiel de Bekker | S2 | 6 |
| (Netherlands) Team 3JP | Volkswagen Golf | 572 | (Netherlands) Pim Kievit | S2 | 6 |

| Icon | Class |
|---|---|
| GT | GT class |
| SS1 | Supersport 1 class |
| SS2 | Supersport 2 class |
| Sport | Sport class |
| S2 | Sport 2 class (Spa R6) |

== Race results ==
| Round | | Circuit | GT Winning Car | Supersport 1 Winning Car | Supersport 2 Winning Car | Sport Winning Car |
| Round | | Circuit | GT Winning Drivers | Supersport 1 Winning Drivers | Supersport 2 Winning Drivers | Sport Winning Drivers |
|---|---|---|---|---|---|---|
| 1 | R1 | (France) Magny-Cours | (Belgium) No. 103 Speedlover | (Netherlands) No. 201 FEBO Racing Team | (Netherlands) No. 303 Veno Racing Team | (Belgium) No. 401 Traxx Racing Team |
| 1 | R1 | (France) Magny-Cours | (Belgium) John de Wilde | (Netherlands) Dennis de Borst (Netherlands) Stan van Oord | (Netherlands) Milan Teekens (Netherlands) Maxime Oosten | (Belgium) Chris Voet (Belgium) Bart van den Broeck |
| 1 | R2 | (France) Magny-Cours | (Netherlands) No. 107 Johan Kraan Motorsport | (Netherlands) No. 266 Ferry Monster Autosport | (Netherlands) No. 303 Veno Racing Team | (Netherlands) No. 403 Racing Team Tappel |
| 1 | R2 | (France) Magny-Cours | (Netherlands) Max Weering | (Netherlands) Max Veels (Netherlands) Jack van der Ende | (Netherlands) Milan Teekens (Netherlands) Maxime Oosten | (Netherlands) Henk Tappel |
| 2 | R1 | (Belgium) Zolder | (Belgium) No. 103 Speedlover | (Netherlands) No. 259 BS Racing Team | (Belgium) No. 381 Why Not Racing | (Netherlands) No. 403 Racing Team Tappel |
| 2 | R1 | (Belgium) Zolder | (Belgium) John de Wilde | (Netherlands) Marcel van de Maat | (Belgium) Nicolas Delencre | (Netherlands) Henk Tappel |
| 2 | R2 | (Belgium) Zolder | (Netherlands) No. 102 BODA Racing | (Austria) No. 247 TrenCar Racing | (Netherlands) No. 306 MWR Racing | (Netherlands) No. 403 Racing Team Tappel |
| 2 | R2 | (Belgium) Zolder | (Netherlands) Bob Herber | (Austria) Bob Bau | (Netherlands) Remco de Beus | (Netherlands) Henk Tappel |
| 3 | R1 | (Belgium) Spa-Francorchamps | (Belgium) No. 103 Speedlover | (Netherlands) No. 201 FEBO Racing Team | (Netherlands) No. 305 Johan Kraan Motorsport | (Belgium) No. 401 Traxx Racing Team |
| 3 | R1 | (Belgium) Spa-Francorchamps | (Belgium) John de Wilde | (Netherlands) Dennis de Borst (Netherlands) Stan van Oord | (United Kingdom) Robin Greenhalgh (Germany) Jerome Greenhalgh | (Belgium) Chris Voet (Belgium) Bart van den Broeck |
| 3 | R2 | (Belgium) Spa-Francorchamps | (Netherlands) No. 115 Certainty Racing Team | (Netherlands) No. 201 FEBO Racing Team | (Netherlands) No. 305 Johan Kraan Motorsport | (Netherlands) No. 402 Spirit Racing |
| 3 | R2 | (Belgium) Spa-Francorchamps | (Netherlands) Florian Dullaart | (Netherlands) Dennis de Borst (Netherlands) Stan van Oord | (United Kingdom) Robin Greenhalgh (Germany) Jerome Greenhalgh | (Netherlands) Rob Nieman |
| 4 | R1 | (Netherlands) Zandvoort | (Netherlands) No. 115 Certainty Racing Team | (Netherlands) No. 266 Ferry Monster Autosport | (Netherlands) No. 303 Veno Racing | (Belgium) No. 401 Traxx Racing Team |
| 4 | R1 | (Netherlands) Zandvoort | (Netherlands) Florian Dullaart | (Netherlands) Max Veels (Netherlands) Jack van der Ende | (Netherlands) Milan Teekens (Netherlands) Maxime Oosten | (Belgium) Chris Voet (Belgium) Bart van den Broeck |
| 4 | R2 | (Netherlands) Zandvoort | (Netherlands) No. 115 Certainty Racing Team | (Netherlands) No. 266 Ferry Monster Autosport | (Netherlands) No. 306 MWR Racing | (Netherlands) No. 403 Racing Team Tappel |
| 4 | R2 | (Netherlands) Zandvoort | (Netherlands) Florian Dullaart | (Netherlands) Max Veels (Netherlands) Jack van der Ende | (Netherlands) Remco de Beus | (Netherlands) Henk Tappel (Netherlands) Harold Wisselink |
| 5 | R1 | (Netherlands) Assen | (Netherlands) No. 107 Johan Kraan Motorsport | (Netherlands) No. 208 JR Motorsport | (Netherlands) No. 352 Koopman Racing | (Netherlands) No. 408 Spirit Racing |
| 5 | R1 | (Netherlands) Assen | (Netherlands) Max Weering | (Netherlands) Ted van Vliet | (Netherlands) Bart Arendsen (Netherlands) Joop Arendsen | (Netherlands) Priscilla Speelman |
| 5 | R2 | (Netherlands) Assen | (Netherlands) No. 117 Cor Euser Racing | (Netherlands) No. 210 Ferry Monster Autosport | (Netherlands) No. 303 Veno Racing | (Netherlands) No. 403 Racing Team Tappel |
| 5 | R2 | (Netherlands) Assen | (Netherlands) Cor Euser | (Netherlands) Lorenzo van Riet (Netherlands) Thijmen Nabuurs | (Netherlands) Milan Teekens (Netherlands) Maxime Oosten | (Netherlands) Henk Tappel |
| 6 | R1 | (Belgium) Spa-Francorchamps | (Belgium) No. 126 JJ Racing | (Netherlands) No. 264 Ferry Monster Autosport | (Netherlands) No. 303 Veno Racing | (Netherlands) No. 410 Certainty Racing Team |
| 6 | R1 | (Belgium) Spa-Francorchamps | (Belgium) Jos Jansen | (Netherlands) Martin Huisman (Belgium) Jonas de Kimpe | (Netherlands) Milan Teekens (Netherlands) Maxime Oosten | (Netherlands) Tim Schulte (Netherlands) Dillon Koster |
| 6 | R2 | (Belgium) Spa-Francorchamps | (Belgium) No. 103 Speedlover | (Netherlands) No. 201 FEBO Racing Team | (Netherlands) No. 383 DayVTec | (Netherlands) No. 401 Traxx Racing Team |
| 6 | R2 | (Belgium) Spa-Francorchamps | (Belgium) John de Wilde | (Netherlands) Dennis de Borst (Netherlands) Stan van Oord | (Netherlands) Leonard Hoogenboom | (Belgium) Voet (Belgium) Bart van den Broeck |
| 7 | R1 | (Netherlands) Assen | (Netherlands) No. 107 Johan Kraan Motorsport | (Netherlands) No. 210 Ferry Monster Autosport | (Netherlands) No. 303 Veno Racing | (Netherlands) No. 402 Spirit Racing |
| 7 | R1 | (Netherlands) Assen | (Netherlands) Max Weering | (Netherlands) Lorenzo van Riet (Netherlands) Thijmen Nabuurs | (Netherlands) Milan Teekens (Netherlands) Maxime Oosten | (Netherlands) Rob Nieman |
| 7 | R2 | (Netherlands) Assen | (Netherlands) No. 107 Johan Kraan Motorsport | (Netherlands) No. 266 Ferry Monster Autosport | (Netherlands) No. 303 Veno Racing | (Netherlands) No. 403 Racing Team Tappel |
| 7 | R2 | (Netherlands) Assen | (Netherlands) Max Weering | (Netherlands) Max Veels (Netherlands) Jack van der Ende | (Netherlands) Milan Teekens (Netherlands) Maxime Oosten | (Netherlands) Henk Tappel |

=== Drivers' championships ===
| Position | **1st** | **2nd** | **3rd** | **4th** | **5th** | **6th** | **7th** | **8th** | **9th** | **10th** | **11th** | **Pole** |
| Points | 23 | 20 | 17 | 15 | 13 | 11 | 9 | 7 | 5 | 3 | 1 | 1 |

==== GT ====
| Pos. | Driver | Team | MAG (France) | | ZOL (Belgium) | | SPA1 (Belgium) | | ZAN (Netherlands) | | ASS1 (Netherlands) | | SPA2 (Belgium) | | ASS2 (Netherlands) | | Points |
|---|---|---|---|---|---|---|---|---|---|---|---|---|---|---|---|---|---|
| 1 | (Belgium) John de Wilde | (Belgium) Speedlover | 1 | 3 | **4** | 7 | **8** | 15 | **2** | 2 | 2 | 4 | 3 | 1 | 7 | 11 | 268 |
| 2 | (Netherlands) Max Weering | (Netherlands) Johan Kraan Motorsport | 4 | 2 | 6 | 11 | 13 | 10 | 3 | 3 | 1 | 2 | **6** | Ret | **5** | 5 | 243 |
| 3 | (Netherlands) Jos Jansen | (Belgium) JJ Racing | 3 | 5 | 5 | 6 | 12 | 12 | Ret | 4 | 6 | 5 | 2 | 10 | 12 | 6 | 195 |
| 4 | (Netherlands) Floorian Dullaart | (Netherlands) Certainty Racing Team | | | | | 9 | 9 | 1 | 1 | 5 | 3 | | | | | 119 |
| 5 | (Belgium) Ward Sluys | (Belgium) JR Motorsport | | | 8 | 8 | 10 | 19 | | | | | 4 | 36 | 8 | 10 | 114 |
| 6 | (Netherlands) Bob Herber | (Netherlands) Boda Racing | **2** | 4 | 9 | 5 | 27 | 22 | | | | | | | | | 84 |
| 7 | (Netherlands) Huub van Eijndhoven | (Netherlands) JW Race Service | | | | | | | | | | | 10 | 2 | 6 | 7 | 70 |
| 8 | (Netherlands) Cor Euser | (Netherlands) Cor Euser Racing | | | | | | | | | **7** | 1 | | | DNS | DNS | 33 |
| 9 | (Lithuania) Justas Jonušis | (Belgium) JR Motorsport | | | | | | | | | | | 4 | 36 | | | 30 |
| 10 | (Belgium) Pierre-Yves Paque (Belgium) Gregory Paisse | (Belgium) Speedlover | | | | | 14 | 11 | | | | | | | | | 28 |
| 11 | (Belgium) Jean-Pierre Verhoeven (Netherlands) Jaxon Verhoeven | (Belgium) Speedlover | | | | | | | | | | | 12 | 13 | | | 28 |
| 12 | (Belgium) Filip Teunkens (Belgium) Nicolas van Dierendonck | (Belgium) EMG Motorsport | | | | | | | | | | | | | 10 | 9 | 28 |
| 13 | (Netherlands) Sandra van der Sloot | (Belgium) JR Motorsport | | | | | | | | | | | | | 8 | 10 | 28 |
| 14 | (Netherlands) Roger Grouwels | (Netherlands) RaceArt | | | | | | | | | 3 | 19 | | | | | 26 |
| 15 | (Netherlands) Dick Freebird | (Netherlands) Dick Freebird | | | | | | | | | 4 | 6 | | | | | 26 |
| 16 | (Denmark) Chris Bergmann (Denmark) Michael Bergmann | (Denmark) Bergmann Motorsport | | | | | 26 | 20 | | | 18 | Ret | | | | | 21 |
| 17 | (Netherlands) Bert Moritz (Netherlands) Patrick Moritz | (Netherlands) Moritz Racing | | | | | | | | | | | DNS | 34 | | | 15 |
| 18 | (Switzerland) Alfred Winkler | (Switzerland) Itris Racing Team | | | | | 15 | 23 | | | | | | | | | 12 |
| 19 | (Switzerland) Thomas Winkler | (Switzerland) Itris Racing Team | | | | | 25 | Ret | | | | | | | | | 9 |
| – | (Switzerland) Thomas Pfister | (Switzerland) Itris Racing Team | | | | | DNS | DNS | | | | | | | | | 0 |
| – | (Netherlands) Hendrik Hoeffner | (Netherlands) MDM Motorsport | | | | | DNS | DNS | | | | | | | | | 0 |
| Pos. | Driver | Team | MAG (France) | | ZOL (Belgium) | | SPA1 (Belgium) | | ZAN (Netherlands) | | ASS1 (Netherlands) | | SPA2 (Belgium) | | ASS2 (Netherlands) | | Points |

Key
| Colour | Result |
|---|---|
| Gold | Winner |
| Silver | Second place |
| Bronze | Third place |
| Green | Other points position |
| Blue | Other classified position |
| Blue | Not classified, finished (NC) |
| Purple | Not classified, retired (Ret) |
| Red | Did not qualify (DNQ) |
| Red | Did not pre-qualify (DNPQ) |
| Black | Disqualified (DSQ) |
| White | Did not start (DNS) |
| White | Race cancelled (C) |
| Blank | Did not practice (DNP) |
| Blank | Excluded (EX) |
| Blank | Did not arrive (DNA) |
| Blank | Withdrawn (WD) |
| Blank | Did not enter (cell empty) |
| Text formatting | Meaning |
| **Bold** | Pole position |
| Italics | Fastest lap |

==== Supersport ====
| Pos. | Driver | Team | MAG (France) | | ZOL (Belgium) | | SPA1 (Belgium) | | ZAN (Netherlands) | | ASS1 (Netherlands) | | SPA2 (Belgium) | | ASS2 (Netherlands) | | Points |
Supersport 1
| 1 | (Netherlands) Dennis de Borst (Netherlands) Stan van Oord | (Netherlands) FEBO Racing Team | **6** | 7 | **4** | 7 | **16** | 14 | 8 | 8 | **11** | 11 | 8 | 4 | 9 | 16 | 227 |
| 2 | (Netherlands) Lorenzo van Riet (Netherlands) Thijmen Nabuurs | (Netherlands) Ferry Monster Autosport | 10 | 8 | 5 | 2 | 17 | Ret | 5 | 9 | 12 | 7 | 9 | 6 | 1 | 5 | 220 |
| 3 | (Netherlands) Martin Huisman (Belgium) Jonas de Kimpe | (Netherlands) DK-Racing powered by FMA | 7 | 20 | 7 | 17 | 21 | 27 | 7 | 6 | 9 | 12 | 5 | 5 | 8 | 3 | 200 |
| 4 | (Netherlands) Jack van der Ende (Netherlands) Max Veels | (Netherlands) Ferry Monster Autosport | 19 | 6 | 8 | 8 | 20 | Ret | 4 | 5 | 14 | 9 | 11 | 7 | **6** | 1 | 198 |
| 5 | (Netherlands) René Steenmetz | (Netherlands) Ferry Monster Autosport | | | 6 | 5 | 18 | Ret | **6** | 10 | 15 | 8 | DNS | 13 | 2 | 2 | 148 |
| 5 | (Netherlands) Stephen Polderman | (Netherlands) Ferry Monster Autosport | | | 6 | 5 | 18 | Ret | **6** | 10 | | | DNS | 13 | 2 | 2 | 148 |
| 6 | (Netherlands) Marcel van de Maat | (Netherlands) BS Racing Team | 9 | 9 | 1 | 6 | Ret | 16 | 6 | Ret | 16 | 15 | | | 4 | 4 | 135 |
| 7 | (Netherlands) Oscar Graper | (Netherlands) Bas Koeten Racing | | | | | 23 | 17 | 10 | 7 | 13 | 10 | | | 3 | 6 | 106 |
| 8 | (Netherlands) Luuk van Loon (Netherlands) Ronald van Loon | (Netherlands) Blueberry Racing | 8 | 10 | 3 | 9 | 22 | Ret | | | Ret | 16 | 15 | 20 | 5 | 7 | 104 |
| 9 | (Netherlands) Ted van Vliet | (Netherlands) JR Motorsport | | | 10 | 10 | 29 | 24 | 11 | 11 | 8 | 13 | 24 | 8 | Ret | 17 | 97 |
| 10 | (Netherlands) Benjamin van den Berg (Netherlands) Robert van den Berg | (Netherlands) Harders Plaza Racing | 20 | DNS | 2 | 3 | 24 | 18 | | | | | | | | | 68 |
| 11 | (Netherlands) Ruud Olij | (Netherlands) Euro Autosport Foundation | | | 9 | 4 | Ret | Ret | Ret | Ret | 10 | Ret | **7** | Ret | | | 58 |
| 12 | (Austria) Bob Bau | (Austria) Trencar Racing | | | 19 | 1 | | | | | 22 | Ret | 18 | 35 | | | 37 |
| 13 | (Netherlands) Peter Schreuers | (Netherlands) BS Racing Team | | | | | | | | | | | | | 4 | 4 | 30 |
| 14 | (Netherlands) Bas Schouten | (Netherlands) Bas Koeten Racing | | | | | | | | | | | | | 3 | 6 | 28 |
| 15 | (Netherlands) Bert van der Zweerde | (Netherlands) JR Motorsport | | | | | | | | | | | | | Ret | 17 | 28 |
| 16 | (Greece) Kosta Kanaroglou | (Spain) E2P Escuela Española de Pilotos | | | | | | | | | | | 33 | 17 | | | 14 |
| 17 | (Netherlands) Tony Vijfschaft | (Netherlands) Vijfschaft Racing Team | | | | | | | | | 19 | 14 | | | | | 10 |
| 18 | (Netherlands) Martijn Kool (Netherlands) Piet de Gier | (Netherlands) Kool Racing | | | | | | | | | | | DNS | 18 | | | 7 |
| 19 | (Netherlands) Hielke East (Netherlands) Pascal Teekens | (Netherlands) Veno Racing | | | | | DNS | DNS | | | 24 | Ret | | | | | 0 |
| – | (Netherlands) Roelant de Waard | (Netherlands) Van der Kooi Racing | | | | | DNS | DNS | | | | | | | | | 0 |
Supersport 2
| 1 | (Netherlands) Maxime Oosten (Netherlands) Milan Teekens | (Netherlands) Veno Racing | **12** | 14 | **12** | Ret | **35** | 32 | **12** | 13 | **21** | 17 | 13 | 12 | **7** | 8 | 281 |
| 2 | (Netherlands) Remco de Beus | (Netherlands) MWR Racing | 14 | 18 | Ret | 15 | Ret | 26 | Ret | 12 | 28 | 21 | 44 | DNS | 17 | Ret | 144 |
| 3 | (Belgium) Jerome Greenhalgh (United Kingdom) Robin Greenhalgh | (Netherlands) Johan Kraan Motorsport | DNS | DNS | | | 34 | 25 | Ret | 21 | 23 | Ret | | | | | 78 |
| 4 | (Netherlands) Bernard Blaak | (Netherlands) Zilhouette Cup | | | | | | | | | 26 | 20 | | | 10 | 10 | 68 |
| 5 | (Netherlands) Peter Koelewijn | (Netherlands) Koopman Racing | | | | | | | | | 20 | 18 | 16 | Ret | | | 57 |
| 6 | (Netherlands) Bart Arendsen | (Netherlands) Koopman Racing | | | | | | | | | 17 | Ret | 20 | 19 | | | 50 |
| 6 | (Netherlands) Joop Arendsen | (Netherlands) Koopman Racing | | | | | | | | | 17 | Ret | | | | | 50 |
| 7 | (Netherlands) Leonard Hoogenboom | (Netherlands) DayVTec | | | | | | | | | | | 14 | 10 | | | 43 |
| 8 | (Belgium) Nicolas Delencre | (Belgium) Why Not Racing | 13 | Ret | 11 | Ret | | | | | | | | | | | 43 |
| 9 | (Netherlands) Tom van der Zwet | (Netherlands) DayVTec | | | | | | | | | | | 25 | 15 | | | 26 |
| 10 | (Netherlands) Mark Wieringa | (Netherlands) Zilhouette Cup | | | | | | | | | 25 | 22 | | | | | 26 |
| 11 | (Netherlands) Jan Willem van Stee | (Netherlands) DayVTec | | | | | | | | | | | 28 | 16 | | | 22 |
| 12 | (Netherlands) Dennis van der Linden | (Netherlands) Certainty Racing Team | | | | | | | | | | | 22 | 25 | | | 18 |
| 13 | (Netherlands) Paul Bloembergen | (Netherlands) Zilhouette Cup | | | | | | | | | 30 | 24 | | | | | 18 |
| 14 | (Belgium) Sjef Jansen | (Netherlands) Koopman Racing | | | | | | | | | | | 38 | 14 | | | 17 |
| 15 | (Netherlands) André Seinen | (Netherlands) DayVTec | | | | | | | | | | | 29 | 21 | | | 16 |
| 16 | (Netherlands) Wolter Zijlstra | (Netherlands) Zilhouette Cup | | | | | | | | | DNS | 28 | | | | | 9 |
| 17 | (Netherlands) Lucas van Eijndhoven | (Netherlands) JW Race Service | | | | | | | | | | | 35 | 22 | | | 8 |
| 18 | (Netherlands) Marcel van der Lyke | (Netherlands) Zilhouette Cup | | | | | | | | | Ret | 32 | | | | | 7 |
| 19 | (Netherlands) Rudy Sluiter | (Netherlands) Certainty Racing Team | | | | | | | | | | | 34 | 26 | | | 6 |
| 20 | (Ukraine) Borys Karhin (Ukraine) Maksim Pashko | (Ukraine) Emoji Racing Team | | | | | | | | | 37 | 33 | | | | | 6 |
| 21 | (Netherlands) Berry Arendsen | (Netherlands) Koopman Racing | | | | | | | | | 31 | Ret | 36 | 29 | | | 5 |
| 22 | (Netherlands) Alexander Berger | (Netherlands) DayVTec | | | | | | | | | | | 32 | Ret | | | 5 |
| 23 | (Netherlands) Jan Berry Drenth | (Netherlands) Zilhouette Cup | | | | | | | | | 35 | Ret | | | | | 3 |
| 24 | (Netherlands) Cas Renders | (Netherlands) DayVTec | | | | | | | | | | | 42 | Ret | | | 0 |
| 25 | (Netherlands) Frank Broersen | (Netherlands) Koopman Racing | | | | | | | | | | | 40 | DNS | | | 0 |
| – | (Netherlands) Sam de Lange | (Netherlands) Zilhouette Cup | | | | | | | | | Ret | Ret | | | | | 0 |
| – | (Netherlands) Jim Ringelberg | (Netherlands) R Racing | Ret | DNS | | | | | | | | | | | | | 0 |
| Pos. | Driver | Team | MAG (France) | | ZOL (Belgium) | | SPA1 (Belgium) | | ZAN (Netherlands) | | ASS1 (Netherlands) | | SPA2 (Belgium) | | ASS2 (Netherlands) | | Points |

Key
| Colour | Result |
|---|---|
| Gold | Winner |
| Silver | Second place |
| Bronze | Third place |
| Green | Other points position |
| Blue | Other classified position |
| Blue | Not classified, finished (NC) |
| Purple | Not classified, retired (Ret) |
| Red | Did not qualify (DNQ) |
| Red | Did not pre-qualify (DNPQ) |
| Black | Disqualified (DSQ) |
| White | Did not start (DNS) |
| White | Race cancelled (C) |
| Blank | Did not practice (DNP) |
| Blank | Excluded (EX) |
| Blank | Did not arrive (DNA) |
| Blank | Withdrawn (WD) |
| Blank | Did not enter (cell empty) |
| Text formatting | Meaning |
| **Bold** | Pole position |
| Italics | Fastest lap |

==== Sport ====
| Pos. | Driver | Team | MAG (France) | | ZOL (Belgium) | | SPA1 (Belgium) | | ZAN (Netherlands) | | ASS1 (Netherlands) | | SPA2 (Belgium) | | ASS2 (Netherlands) | | Points |
Sport 1
| 1 | (Netherlands) Rob Nieman | (Netherlands) Spirit Racing | 16 | 15 | 14 | 12 | 31 | 28 | 14 | 15 | 36 | 26 | 27 | 28 | 11 | 14 | 263 |
| 2 | (Belgium) Bart van den Broeck (Belgium) Chris Voet | (Belgium) Traxx Racing Team | 15 | 16 | 15 | 13 | 30 | 31 | 13 | 17 | 29 | 27 | **31** | 23 | 14 | DNS | 239 |
| 3 | (Netherlands) Sandra van der Sloot | (Netherlands) Spirit Racing | | | 17 | Ret | 36 | 29 | 15 | 19 | 32 | 29 | 30 | 24 | 12 | 11 | 181 |
| 3 | (Netherlands) John van der Voort | (Netherlands) Spirit Racing | | | 17 | Ret | 36 | 29 | 15 | 19 | | | 30 | 24 | 12 | 11 | 181 |
| 4 | (Netherlands) Dillon Koster (Netherlands) Tim Schulte | (Netherlands) Certainty Racing Team | | | 18 | 16 | 32 | 30 | 16 | 18 | 33 | 31 | 23 | 27 | 15 | 13 | 178 |
| 5 | (Netherlands) Henk Tappel (Belgium) Harold Wisselink | (Netherlands) Racing Team Tappel | **Ret** | 13 | **13** | 11 | **34** | Ret | **Ret** | 14 | **Ret** | 23 | | | **17** | 9 | 152 |
| 6 | (Netherlands) Bart Drost | (Netherlands) Spirit Racing | | | 16 | 14 | | | | | 32 | 29 | | | | | 60 |
| 7 | (Netherlands) Dick van Elk | (Netherlands) Blueberry Racing | 18 | 19 | | | 33 | 33 | | | | | | | | | 56 |
| 8 | (Netherlands) Priscilla Speelman | (Netherlands) Spirit Racing | | | | | | | | | 27 | 30 | | | 13 | Ret | 51 |
| 9 | (Netherlands) Jaxon Verhoeven (Netherlands) Estella van der Wiel | (Netherlands) Eljax Racing | 17 | 17 | Ret | DNS | | | | | | | | | | | 32 |
| 10 | (Netherlands) Danny Wagtmans | (Netherlands) Wagtmans Racing | DNS | DNS | Ret | DNS | | | Ret | 16 | 34 | Ret | | | DNS | Ret | 30 |
| 11 | (Netherlands) Dillon Koster (Netherlands) Martin de Kleijn | (Netherlands) Certainty Racing Team | | | | | | | | | | | | | 16 | 13 | 22 |
| 12 | (Netherlands) Leo van der Eijk | (Netherlands) Forze Hydrogen Electric Racing | | | | | | | | | Ret | 25 | | | | | 20 |
| 13 | (Belgium) Jean-Pierre Verhoeven | (Netherlands) JS Racing | | | | | | | | | | | | | Ret | 12 | 17 |
| 14 | (Netherlands) Jan Bot | (Netherlands) Forze Hydrogen Electric Racing | | | | | | | Ret | 20 | | | | | | | 9 |
| Pos. | Driver | Team | MAG (France) | | ZOL (Belgium) | | SPA1 (Belgium) | | ZAN (Netherlands) | | ASS1 (Netherlands) | | SPA2 (Belgium) | | ASS2 (Netherlands) | | Points |

Key
| Colour | Result |
|---|---|
| Gold | Winner |
| Silver | Second place |
| Bronze | Third place |
| Green | Other points position |
| Blue | Other classified position |
| Blue | Not classified, finished (NC) |
| Purple | Not classified, retired (Ret) |
| Red | Did not qualify (DNQ) |
| Red | Did not pre-qualify (DNPQ) |
| Black | Disqualified (DSQ) |
| White | Did not start (DNS) |
| White | Race cancelled (C) |
| Blank | Did not practice (DNP) |
| Blank | Excluded (EX) |
| Blank | Did not arrive (DNA) |
| Blank | Withdrawn (WD) |
| Blank | Did not enter (cell empty) |
| Text formatting | Meaning |
| **Bold** | Pole position |
| Italics | Fastest lap |
