= 2016 Italian F4 Championship =

2016 Italian Formula 4 Championship

The 2016 Italian F4 Championship (commercially titled 2016 Italian F4 Championship Powered by Abarth) was the third season of the Italian F4 Championship. It began on 9 April in Misano and finished on 30 October in Monza after seven rounds.

== Calendar ==
The calendar was published on 23 November 2015, with all events held in Italy.

Round	Circuit	Date	Supporting	Map of circuit locations
1	Misano World Circuit Marco Simoncelli, Misano Adriatico	April 8–10	GT Series Sprint Cup	2016 Italian F4 Championship is located in Italy
2	Adria International Raceway, Adria	May 6–8	Italian Touring Car Championship; Auto GP	2016 Italian F4 Championship is located in Italy
3	Autodromo Enzo e Dino Ferrari, Imola	May 27–29	Italian Touring Car Championship; Porsche Carrera Cup Italy	2016 Italian F4 Championship is located in Italy
4	Mugello Circuit, Scarperia e San Piero	July 15–17	Italian Touring Car Championship; Porsche Carrera Cup Italy	2016 Italian F4 Championship is located in Italy
5	ACI Vallelunga Circuit, Campagnano di Roma	September 9–11	Italian Touring Car Championship; Porsche Carrera Cup Italy	2016 Italian F4 Championship is located in Italy
6	Autodromo Enzo e Dino Ferrari, Imola	September 23–25	Italian Touring Car Championship; Porsche Carrera Cup Italy	2016 Italian F4 Championship is located in Italy
7	Autodromo Nazionale di Monza, Monza	October 28–30	Italian Touring Car Championship	2016 Italian F4 Championship is located in Italy

== Teams and drivers ==
Team	No.	Driver	Class	Rounds
(Italy) Vincenzo Sospiri Racing	3	(Italy) Simone Cunati	R	1–6
(Italy) Vincenzo Sospiri Racing	6	(United States) Jaden Conwright	R	All
(Italy) Vincenzo Sospiri Racing	33	(Japan) Marino Sato		All
(Italy) Prema Powerteam	5	(Germany) Mick Schumacher		1, 3–7
(Italy) Prema Powerteam	44	(Estonia) Jüri Vips	R	1, 3–7
(Italy) Prema Powerteam	68	(Ecuador) Juan Manuel Correa	R	1, 3–7
(Switzerland) RB Racing	7	(Venezuela) Sebastián Fernández	R	1–6
(Switzerland) RB Racing	9	(Italy) Diego Bertonelli		1–2
(Switzerland) RB Racing	25	(Venezuela) Mauricio Baiz		7
(Switzerland) RB Racing	98	(Czech Republic) Václav Šafář		7
(Switzerland) RB Racing	99	(Russia) Yan Leon Shlom		All
(Germany) Mücke Motorsport	7	(Venezuela) Sebastián Fernández	R	7
(Germany) Mücke Motorsport	22	(China) Yifei Ye		1–4, 6–7
(Germany) Mücke Motorsport	24	(Canada) Devlin DeFrancesco		1, 3–7
(Germany) Mücke Motorsport	25	(Venezuela) Mauricio Baiz		1–4
(Germany) Mücke Motorsport	26	(Switzerland) Ricardo Feller	R	5
(Germany) Mücke Motorsport	51	(Italy) Aldo Festante	R	1–6
(Italy) ADM Motorsport	8	(Brazil) Mauro Auricchio		5–7
(Italy) Bhaitech Engineering	9	(Italy) Diego Bertonelli		3–7
(Italy) Bhaitech Engineering	10	(Italy) Giacomo Altoè	R	All
(Italy) Bhaitech Engineering	11	(United Kingdom) Aaron di Comberti	R	1
(Italy) Bhaitech Engineering	31	(Netherlands) Richard Verschoor	R	2
(Italy) Bhaitech Engineering	37	(Italy) Lorenzo Colombo	R	5–7
(Italy) Bhaitech Engineering	76	(Spain) Antolín González	R	4
(Italy) Diegi Motorsport	12	(Brazil) Giuliano Raucci		All
(Austria) Lechner Racing	13	(Switzerland) Yannik Brandt	R	1
(Austria) Lechner Racing	14	(Austria) Thomas Preining		1
(Switzerland) Jenzer Motorsport	15	(Estonia) Jan-Erik Meikup		1
(Switzerland) Jenzer Motorsport	16	(Netherlands) Job van Uitert		1, 3–7
(Switzerland) Jenzer Motorsport	17	(Argentina) Diego Ciantini		All
(Switzerland) Jenzer Motorsport	18	(Argentina) Marcos Siebert		All
(Switzerland) Jenzer Motorsport	19	(Switzerland) Giacomo Bianchi	R	All
(Switzerland) Jenzer Motorsport	20	(Germany) Kevin Kratz		1–2, 4–5
(Switzerland) Jenzer Motorsport	21	(Switzerland) Fabio Scherer	R	1–3
(Italy) Antonelli Motorsport	27	(Italy) Federico Malvestiti	R	All
(Italy) Antonelli Motorsport	32	(Romania) Emilian Galbiati		1–3
(Italy) Antonelli Motorsport	97	(Brazil) João Vieira		1–5
(Italy) GSK Grand Prix	35	(Belgium) Amaury Bonduel		1
(Italy) GSK Grand Prix	36	(Italy) Mariano Lavigna	R	4
(Italy) BVM Racing	37	(Italy) Lorenzo Colombo	R	1–4
(Italy) BVM Racing	38	(India) Kush Maini	R	All
(Portugal) DR Formula	41	(Mexico) Raúl Guzmán		All
(Portugal) DR Formula	42	(Russia) Artem Petrov	R G	All
(Portugal) DR Formula	46	(Liechtenstein) Fabienne Wohlwend	R W	2–7
(Italy) DRZ Benelli	45	(Guatemala) Ian Rodríguez	R	1–4, 6–7
(Germany) Aragon Racing	46	(Liechtenstein) Fabienne Wohlwend	R W	1
(Italy) Torino Squadra Corse	55	(Argentina) Federico Iribarne		1–3
(Italy) Kiteviola Motorsport	69	(France) Valentin Hasse-Clot		1–2
(Italy) Teramo Racing Team	71	(Italy) Riccardo Ponzio		1–3, 5, 7
(Italy) Cram Motorsport	81	(Qatar) Ahmad Al Muhannadi		6
(Italy) Cram Motorsport	82	(Netherlands) Leonard Hoogenboom	R	All
(Italy) Cram Motorsport	83	(Venezuela) Manuel Maldonado	R	All
(Italy) Cram Motorsport	84	(Russia) Aleksandr Vartanyan		1

Icon	Class
R	Rookie
W	Women Trophy
G	Guest drivers ineligible to score points

== Season summary ==
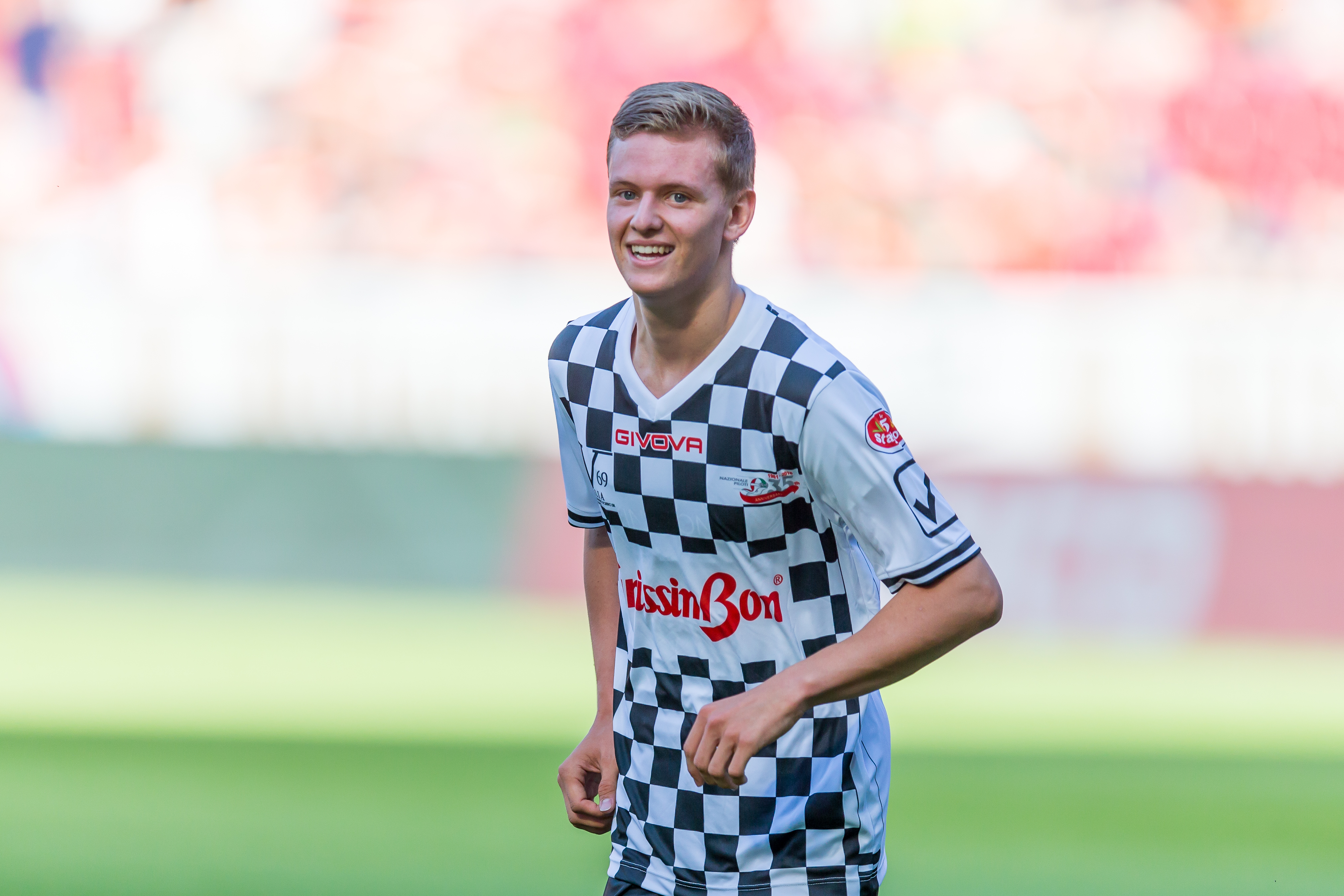
Mick Schumacher was labelled the championship favourite, however Prema Powerteam's non-appearance at Adria cost the German the title to Marcos Siebert.

A Formula 4 record of 41 cars entered the first round of the season at Misano, highlighting the Italian series' popularity as it competed against the German championship for the most talented drivers. Due to the large number of entries and lack of circuit space, the race format was radically changed. Drivers were placed in three groups (A, B and C) depending on their qualifying placement. Each group contested two qualifying races, facing one of the other groups in each race. After the three qualifying races, the 36 drivers having scored the most points contested the final race. All four races were 25 minutes plus one lap in length and yielded the same number of points. The first group race proved largely uneventful, however the second was held in wet conditions with a safety car start – Mick Schumacher claiming both Saturday race wins. The final group race saw a four-car pile-up at the start involving Diego Bertonelli, Leonard Hoogenboom, Ye Yifei and Aaron di Comberti, requiring a complete restart; the race ended under red flags after Jaden Conwright spun into the barrier at the last corner, with Raúl Guzmán awarded victory. In the 36-car final, Mauricio Baiz stalled at the start and was collected by Thomas Preining, whilst rookie Juan Manuel Correa terminally damaged his suspension in a coming together with Simone Cunati. Marcos Siebert won the final race of the weekend, followed by Jüri Vips and Guzmán.

The unique format was retained for the second round at Adria International Raceway, however a major drop to 31 entries made it an ultimately unnecessary precaution as the circuit had a 32-car limit. Amongst the absentees were Lechner Racing, who elected to focus on the German series, and Prema Powerteam. Kevin Kratz suffered a major crash in practice and was ruled out of the weekend. Baiz claimed his first Italian F4 victory in Race 1, and backed it up with second in Race 2 behind Guzmán after Baiz's team-mate Ye was disqualified. Siebert went from fourth to first in Race 3 after a clash between Federico Iribarne, Giacomo Bianchi and Fabienne Wohlwend brought out the safety car, before Baiz capped off his breakout weekend with a lights-to-flag win in a chaotic final after a safety car in the closing stages caught the wrong driver, resulting in a 30-second gap between the top eight and the rest of the field.

Following the massive decline in entries for the second round, the series reverted to the three-race format used in 2015 from the third round at Imola onwards. A carnage-filled opening race saw Siebert win from pole amidst two safety cars and a red-flag finish – Prema team-mates Correa and Vips crashed at pit entry, followed by a rollover for Federico Malvestiti having crossed the circuit at Rivazza 1 and then Diego Ciantini beaching himself in the gravel at Tamburello. Schumacher triumphed on his return to the series in a damp Race 2 run mostly under safety car, before Correa claimed his first-ever race win in cars in a reverse-grid sprint race truncated by a race-ending airborne crash for Ciantini on the main straight – despite the incident, the Argentine was classified third on count-back having been involved in a podium battle with Yan Leon Shlom.

Correa continued where he left off in the fourth round at Mugello, scoring a grand chelem in the first heat having dominated qualifying, led every lap and claimed the fastest lap in Race 1. Race 2 was marred by a major start-line crash in which João Vieira stalled at the front of the grid, with Conwright and Mariano Lavigna, unsighted from the back of the field, careening into the Brazilian – leaving débutant Lavigna with a foot injury. Having conducted a full-race restart, Correa's run of good form came to a sudden end when team-mate Schumacher crashed into him at San Donato on the second lap whilst fighting for the lead, putting the German out with terminal damage and gifting a maiden win to Giuliano Raucci for the privateer Diegi Motorsport team. Siebert jumped from third to first at the start of Race 3 and maintained his lead to the end of an uneventful heat to put himself 39 points clear of Schumacher at the top of the standings; Schumacher not helped by another non-score in the last race despite setting the fastest lap.

DR Formula had a dream start to the Vallelunga weekend, with Gúzman and team-mate Artem Petrov finishing the opening race 1–2 in mixed conditions that led to Kratz aquaplaning off at Cimini 1 at high speed. The weather cleared for Race 2, but the grass was still slippery as Ricardo Feller (replacing Ye for the round) discovered having slid off the circuit and launching off the kerb at Campagnano – Schumacher won the race having jumped Vips at the start. Correa won Race 3, which was mostly run under safety car due to debris from another start-line incident (this time between Gúzman, Vieira and Marino Sato); but with Schumacher second and Siebert having finished no higher than 5th all weekend, the German had closed the championship gap to 10 points.

Returning to Imola for the penultimate round, the title race looked like a guaranteed two-way fight between Marcos Siebert of Jenzer Motorsport and Mick Schumacher of Prema Powerteam – however, having beaten his rival to pole position, Schumacher squandered his run of momentum with a drive-through penalty for a jump-start in the opening race, resulting in no points despite a fightback to 13th; but the German was saved by a post-race penalty for Siebert, voiding the Argentine's podium finish, as Job van Uitert took his first win. Schumacher's weekend went from bad to worse in Race 2 when he was crashed into at the first corner by a false-starting Bertonelli; Van Uitert claimed back-to-back wins having fended off Lorenzo Colombo through a multitude of safety car restarts. Sato claimed his first win after a track-limits penalty was imposed on Shlom in the reverse-grid sprint, as both championship contenders failed to score – Schumacher starting at the back and Siebert spinning at Tamburello on the final lap. Gúzman also failed to make inroads on the top two in the standings having collided with Correa in the final race, leaving a 25-point margin at the top with one round remaining.

Schumacher started the final weekend at Monza in the best possible way, jumping Sebastián Fernández at the start and taking a commanding victory, whilst rival Siebert made an ultimately crucial drive from 11th to 2nd to maintain a comfortable points lead – aided by a collision between Vips, Fernández and Bertonelli at Lesmo 1. This meant Schumacher had to beat Siebert in Race 2 to keep his championship hopes alive – but light contact with eventual race-winner Fernández at Variante della Roggia broke the German's front wing, necessitating a pit-stop and allowing Siebert to cruise home in fifth to take the title. Vips claimed the last race win of the year, as well as the rookie championship, in comfortable fashion after a first-corner collision between Bertonelli, Kush Maini and Siebert beached the new champion on a kerb, whilst Sato and Ye collided in a battle for second and an energised 10-car battle took place for the minor points.

Despite the clear intentions of the FIA Global Pathway to make Formula 4 the starting point on the road to Formula One, and the regulations being in their third year of usage, a lack of cost control saw the record-breaking entry numbers seen at the start of the season fall away as competitors ultimately voted with their feet. Whilst Italian F4 maintained its reputation as the most competitive Formula 4 championship internationally, it would take another six years before 40+ car fields returned to the series.

== Results and standings ==
=== Season summary ===
Round		Circuit	Pole position	Fastest lap	Winning driver	Winning team	Secondary Class winner
1	R1	Misano	(Argentina) Marcos Siebert	(Mexico) Raúl Guzmán	(Germany) Mick Schumacher	(Italy) Prema Powerteam	R: (Ecuador) Juan Manuel Correa
1	R2	Misano	(Germany) Mick Schumacher	(Netherlands) Job van Uitert	(Germany) Mick Schumacher	(Italy) Prema Powerteam	R: (Ecuador) Juan Manuel Correa; W: (Liechtenstein) Fabienne Wohlwend
1	R3	Misano	(Argentina) Marcos Siebert	(Estonia) Jüri Vips	(Mexico) Raúl Guzmán	(Portugal) DR Formula	R: (Estonia) Jüri Vips; W: (Liechtenstein) Fabienne Wohlwend
1	R4	Misano	(Germany) Mick Schumacher	(Germany) Mick Schumacher	(Argentina) Marcos Siebert	(Switzerland) Jenzer Motorsport	R: (Estonia) Jüri Vips
2	R1	Adria	(Venezuela) Mauricio Baiz	(Italy) Simone Cunati	(Venezuela) Mauricio Baiz	(Germany) Mücke Motorsport	R: (Italy) Simone Cunati; W: (Liechtenstein) Fabienne Wohlwend
2	R2	Adria	(Mexico) Raúl Guzmán	(China) Yifei Ye	(Mexico) Raúl Guzmán	(Portugal) DR Formula	R: (Guatemala) Ian Rodríguez
2	R3	Adria	(Mexico) Raúl Guzmán	(Argentina) Marcos Siebert	(Argentina) Marcos Siebert	(Switzerland) Jenzer Motorsport	R: (Italy) Simone Cunati
2	R4	Adria	(Venezuela) Mauricio Baiz	(China) Yifei Ye	(Venezuela) Mauricio Baiz	(Germany) Mücke Motorsport	R: (Italy) Simone Cunati; W: (Liechtenstein) Fabienne Wohlwend
3	R1	Imola	(Argentina) Marcos Siebert	(Germany) Mick Schumacher	(Argentina) Marcos Siebert	(Switzerland) Jenzer Motorsport	R: (Italy) Lorenzo Colombo; W: (Liechtenstein) Fabienne Wohlwend
3	R2	Imola	(Germany) Mick Schumacher	(Netherlands) Job van Uitert	(Germany) Mick Schumacher	(Italy) Prema Powerteam	R: (Italy) Lorenzo Colombo; W: (Liechtenstein) Fabienne Wohlwend
3	R3	Imola		(Guatemala) Ian Rodríguez	(Ecuador) Juan Manuel Correa	(Italy) Prema Powerteam	R: (Ecuador) Juan Manuel Correa; W: (Liechtenstein) Fabienne Wohlwend
4	R1	Mugello	(Ecuador) Juan Manuel Correa	(Ecuador) Juan Manuel Correa	(Ecuador) Juan Manuel Correa	(Italy) Prema Powerteam	R: (Ecuador) Juan Manuel Correa; W: (Liechtenstein) Fabienne Wohlwend
4	R2	Mugello	(Ecuador) Juan Manuel Correa	(Italy) Diego Bertonelli	(Brazil) Giuliano Raucci	(Italy) Diegi Motorsport	R: (Estonia) Jüri Vips; W: (Liechtenstein) Fabienne Wohlwend
4	R3	Mugello		(Germany) Mick Schumacher	(Argentina) Marcos Siebert	(Switzerland) Jenzer Motorsport	R: (Estonia) Jüri Vips; W: (Liechtenstein) Fabienne Wohlwend
5	R1	Vallelunga	(Estonia) Jüri Vips	(Germany) Mick Schumacher	(Mexico) Raúl Guzmán	(Portugal) DR Formula	R: (Estonia) Jüri Vips; W: (Liechtenstein) Fabienne Wohlwend
5	R2	Vallelunga	(Estonia) Jüri Vips	(Germany) Mick Schumacher	(Germany) Mick Schumacher	(Italy) Prema Powerteam	R: (Estonia) Jüri Vips; W: (Liechtenstein) Fabienne Wohlwend
5	R3	Vallelunga		(Germany) Mick Schumacher	(Ecuador) Juan Manuel Correa	(Italy) Prema Powerteam	R: (Ecuador) Juan Manuel Correa; W: (Liechtenstein) Fabienne Wohlwend
6	R1	Imola	(Germany) Mick Schumacher	(Estonia) Jüri Vips	(Netherlands) Job van Uitert	(Switzerland) Jenzer Motorsport	R: (Estonia) Jüri Vips; W: (Liechtenstein) Fabienne Wohlwend
6	R2	Imola	(Argentina) Marcos Siebert	(Estonia) Jüri Vips	(Netherlands) Job van Uitert	(Switzerland) Jenzer Motorsport	R: (Italy) Lorenzo Colombo
6	R3	Imola		(Netherlands) Job van Uitert	(Japan) Marino Sato	(Italy) Vincenzo Sospiri Racing	R: (Netherlands) Leonard Hoogenboom; W: (Liechtenstein) Fabienne Wohlwend
7	R1	Monza	(Venezuela) Sebastián Fernández	(Italy) Diego Bertonelli	(Germany) Mick Schumacher	(Italy) Prema Powerteam	R: (Italy) Lorenzo Colombo; W: (Liechtenstein) Fabienne Wohlwend
7	R2	Monza	(Venezuela) Sebastián Fernandez	(Venezuela) Sebastián Fernandez	(Venezuela) Sebastián Fernandez	(Germany) Mücke Motorsport	R: (Venezuela) Sebastián Fernandez; W: (Liechtenstein) Fabienne Wohlwend
7	R3	Monza		(Russia) Artem Petrov	(Estonia) Jüri Vips	(Italy) Prema Powerteam	R: (Estonia) Jüri Vips; W: (Liechtenstein) Fabienne Wohlwend

=== Championship standings ===
Points system

Points were awarded to the top 10 classified finishers in each race. No points were awarded for pole position or fastest lap. Only the best sixteen results were counted towards the championship. Race 3 of the first meeting at Imola Circuit was stopped after five laps, and half points were awarded.

Position	**1st**	**2nd**	**3rd**	**4th**	**5th**	**6th**	**7th**	**8th**	**9th**	**10th**
Points	25	18	15	12	10	8	6	4	2	1
Points	13	11	9	6	5	4	2	1		

==== Drivers' standings ====
Pos	Driver	MIS				ADR				IMO1			MUG			VLL			IMO2			MNZ			Pts
Pos	Driver	R1	R2	R3	R4	R1	R2	R3	R4	R1	R2	R3	R1	R2	R3	R1	R2	R3	R1	R2	R3	R1	R2	R3	Pts
1	(Argentina) Marcos Siebert	**5**		**2**	1	5		1	3	**1**	2	6	Ret	8	1	6	5	6	25	**3**	20	2	5	Ret	231
2	(Germany) Mick Schumacher	1	**1**		**4**					2	**1**	4	2	Ret	11	3	1	2	**12**	Ret	22	1	25	2	216
3	(Mexico) Raúl Guzmán	2		1	3		**1**	**Ret**	5	27	6	9	4	4	8	1	6	Ret	9	7	Ret	3	2	16	202
4	(Netherlands) Job van Uitert		2	3	5					3	3	5	10	9	4	12	13	10	1	1	25	6	13	9	143.5
5	(Estonia) Jüri Vips	7		5	2					Ret	16	11	9	3	3	**4**	**2**	14	2	19	9	Ret	3	1	140
6	(Ecuador) Juan Manuel Correa	3	4		Ret					Ret	9	1	**1**	**16**	9	5	10	1	Ret	4	5	11	23	19	105.5
7	(Italy) Simone Cunati	4		23	Ret	3		2	7	9	26	18	7	12	23	10	Ret	21	3	5	4				95
8	(Brazil) Giuliano Raucci	26	12		11	7	5		26	6	25	15	3	1	15	8	3	9	Ret	Ret	DNS	13	15	Ret	86
9	(Venezuela) Mauricio Baiz		6	6	Ret	**1**	3		**1**	8	14	14	Ret	11	13							DNS	DNS	DNS	85
10	(China) Yifei Ye		20	Ret	DNQ		2	DSQ	2	7	4	7	28	7	7				8	22	17	5	9	Ret	79
11	(Italy) Diego Bertonelli		3	Ret	13		14	13	20	25	24	21	6	2	10	7	4	7	15	15	10	19	4	Ret	77
12	(Italy) Lorenzo Colombo		17	14	Ret	9	12		15	5	5	8	20	22	19	13	19	13	4	2	6	4	22	7	73.5
13	(Brazil) João Vieira	6		12	6	2	4		4	16	11	10	5	DNS	30	23	11	Ret							69
14	(Russia) Yan Leon Shlom		7	4	12	4	11		9	Ret	10	2	11	10	2	15	23	15	22	10	7	DSQ	DSQ	DNS	56.5
15	(Venezuela) Sebastián Fernández	Ret		9	16	19		11	19	22	22	29	12	6	6	Ret	9	4	14	13	26	**20**	**1**	5	55
16	(India) Kush Maini	8		10	8		7	6	10	15	12	13	18	Ret	16	26	8	3	6	Ret	13	Ret	7	21	53
17	(Guatemala) Ian Rodríguez	22		8	25		6	5	14	14	Ret	22	Ret	Ret	21				24	Ret	12	8	6	3	43
18	(Japan) Marino Sato	27	11		22	13		4	8	11	21	16	15	17	12	19	15	Ret	7	8	1	Ret	10	Ret	42
19	(Canada) Devlin DeFrancesco	23	9		10					Ret	7	Ret	8	5	5	9	Ret	DNS	Ret	11	8	Ret	12	6	40
20	(Argentina) Diego Ciantini	11	10		Ret	16	9		12	4	8	3	Ret	13	18	Ret	16	12	5	Ret	15	Ret	20	DNS	33.5
21	(Netherlands) Richard Verschoor					6		3	6																31
22	(Italy) Giacomo Altoè		22	7	14		8	10	17	19	19	27	23	20	20	25	12	8	17	12	11	7	14	8	21
23	(Netherlands) Leonard Hoogenboom		19	Ret	23	Ret	10		16	24	13	30	16	15	14	14	Ret	17	11	9	3	17	8	Ret	20
24	(France) Valentin Hasse-Clot		5	18	7	11		DSQ	Ret																16
25	(Italy) Federico Malvestiti	17		15	18	8		7	11	Ret	DNS	DNS	22	24	25	24	17	18	20	14	23	14	Ret	10	10
26	(Belgium) Amaury Bonduel	14	8		20																				4
27	(Romania) Emilian Galbiati		15	16	21		17	8	Ret	18	29	23													4
28	(Argentina) Federico Iribarne	9		11	9	15		15	Ret	17	17	19													4
29	(Switzerland) Fabio Scherer	25	13		26		18	9	13	10	Ret	25													3
30	(United States) Jaden Conwright	19		22	Ret		16	Ret	24	12	18	17	14	DNS	29	20	22	16	21	17	14	9	11	14	2
31	(Brazil) Mauro Auricchio															21	18	11	10	21	16	10	17	13	2
32	(Italy) Aldo Festante	24		17	19	10	13		18	21	23	28	17	21	Ret	18	14	26	16	18	21				1
33	(Germany) Kevin Kratz	10		21	17		DNS	DNS	WD				13	18	17	Ret	Ret	20							1
34	(Switzerland) Giacomo Bianchi	18	23		24		Ret	14	23	22	27	26	25	25	27	11	21	25	18	Ret	19	18	24	12	1
35	(Liechtenstein) Fabienne Wohlwend		21	20	DNQ	17		Ret	22	26	20	20	24	23	26	17	24	19	19	Ret	24	12	16	11	0
36	(Venezuela) Manuel Maldonado	20	Ret		DNQ	18		12	21	23	28	24	27	19	24	Ret	Ret	23	13	16	18	16	21	17	0
37	(Austria) Thomas Preining	12	16		Ret																				0
38	(Italy) Riccardo Ponzio	15		13	Ret	14	19		25	WD	WD	WD				16	20	24				Ret	19	15	0
39	(Russia) Aleksandr Vartanyan	13	18		15																				0
40	(Estonia) Jan-Erik Meikup	16	Ret		Ret																				0
41	(Czech Republic) Václav Šafář																					DSQ	DSQ	18	0
42	(Switzerland) Yannik Brandt		Ret	19	DNQ																				0
43	(Qatar) Ahmad Al Muhannadi																		23	20	Ret				0
44	(Italy) Mariano Lavigna												21	DNS	DNS										0
45	(Switzerland) Ricardo Feller															22	Ret	22							0
46	(United Kingdom) Aaron di Comberti		24	Ret	DNQ																				0
47	(Spain) Antolín González												26	26	28										0
Drivers ineligible to score points
	(Russia) Artem Petrov	21	14		Ret	12	15		27	13	15	12	19	14	22	2	7	5	Ret	6	2	Ret	Ret	4	0
Pos	Driver	R1	R2	R3	R4	R1	R2	R3	R4	R1	R2	R3	R1	R2	R3	R1	R2	R3	R1	R2	R3	R1	R2	R3	Pts
Pos	Driver	MIS				ADR				IMO1			MUG			VLL			IMO2			MNZ			Pts

Colour	Result
Gold	Winner
Silver	Second place
Bronze	Third place
Green	Points classification
Blue	Non-points classification
Blue	Non-classified finish (NC)
Purple	Retired, not classified (Ret)
Red	Did not qualify (DNQ)
Red	Did not pre-qualify (DNPQ)
Black	Disqualified (DSQ)
White	Did not start (DNS)
White	Withdrew (WD)
White	Race cancelled (C)
Blank	Did not practice (DNP)
Blank	Did not arrive (DNA)
Blank	Excluded (EX)

**Bold** – Pole
Italics – Fastest Lap

==== Secondary Classes' standings ====
Pos	Driver	MIS				ADR				IMO1			MUG			VLL			IMO2			MNZ			Pts
Pos	Driver	R1	R2	R3	R4	R1	R2	R3	R4	R1	R2	R3	R1	R2	R3	R1	R2	R3	R1	R2	R3	R1	R2	R3	Pts
Rookie Trophy
1	(Estonia) Jüri Vips	7		5	2					Ret	16	11	9	3	3	4	2	14	2	19	9	Ret	3	1	247.5
2	(Italy) Lorenzo Colombo		17	14	Ret	9	12		15	5	5	8	20	22	19	13	19	13	4	2	6	4	22	7	207.5
3	(Italy) Simone Cunati	4		23	Ret	3		2	7	9	26	18	7	12	23	10	Ret	21	3	5	4				205
4	(Ecuador) Juan Manuel Correa	3	4		Ret					Ret	9	1	1	16	9	5	10	1	Ret	4	5	11	23	19	198.5
5	(India) Kush Maini	8		10	8		7	6	10	15	12	13	18	Ret	16	26	8	3	6	Ret	13	Ret	7	21	182
6	(Venezuela) Sebastián Fernández	Ret		9	16	19		11	19	22	22	29	12	6	6	Ret	9	4	14	13	26	20	1	5	156
7	(Italy) Giacomo Altoè		22	7	14		8	10	17	19	19	27	23	20	20	25	12	8	17	12	11	7	14	8	150
8	(Netherlands) Leonard Hoogenboom		19	Ret	23	Ret	10		16	24	13	30	16	15	14	14	Ret	17	11	9	3	17	8	Ret	131
9	(Guatemala) Ian Rodríguez	22		8	25		6	5	14	14	Ret	22	Ret	Ret	21				24	Ret	12	8	6	3	128.5
10	(Italy) Federico Malvestiti	17		15	18	8		7	11	Ret	DNS	DNS	22	24	25	24	17	18	20	14	23	14	Ret	10	93
11	(United States) Jaden Conwright	19		22	Ret		16	Ret	24	12	18	17	14	DNS	29	20	22	16	21	17	14	9	11	14	74.5
12	(Italy) Aldo Festante	24		17	19	10	13		18	21	23	28	17	21	Ret	18	14	26	16	18	21				71
13	(Liechtenstein) Fabienne Wohlwend		21	20	DNQ	17		Ret	22	26	20	20	24	23	26	17	24	19	19	Ret	24	12	16	11	47
14	(Switzerland) Fabio Scherer	25	13		26		18	9	13	10	Ret	25													45
15	(Venezuela) Manuel Maldonado	20	Ret		DNQ	18		12	21	23	28	24	27	19	24	Ret	Ret	23	13	16	18	16	21	17	38
16	(Switzerland) Giacomo Bianchi	18	23		24		Ret	14	23	22	27	26	25	25	27	11	21	25	18	Ret	19	18	24	12	37
17	(Brazil) Mauro Auricchio (Note: Auricchio was considered as Rookie only in the first race at Imola.)															21	18	11	10	21	16	10	17	13	10
18	(United Kingdom) Aaron di Comberti		24	Ret	DNQ																				4
19	(Switzerland) Yannik Brandt		Ret	19	DNQ																				2
20	(Italy) Mariano Lavigna												21	DNS	DNS										1
21	(Switzerland) Ricardo Feller															22	Ret	22							1
Drivers ineligible to score points
	(Russia) Artem Petrov	21	14		Ret	12	15		27	13	15	12	19	14	22	2	7	5	Ret	6	2	Ret	Ret	4	0
F4 Woman Trophy
1	(Liechtenstein) Fabienne Wohlwend		21	20	DNQ	17		Ret	22	26	20	20	24	23	26	17	24	19	19	Ret	24	12	16	11	400
Pos	Driver	R1	R2	R3	R4	R1	R2	R3	R4	R1	R2	R3	R1	R2	R3	R1	R2	R3	R1	R2	R3	R1	R2	R3	Pts
Pos	Driver	MIS				ADR				IMO1			MUG			VLL			IMO2			MNZ			Pts

Colour	Result
Gold	Winner
Silver	Second place
Bronze	Third place
Green	Points classification
Blue	Non-points classification
Blue	Non-classified finish (NC)
Purple	Retired, not classified (Ret)
Red	Did not qualify (DNQ)
Red	Did not pre-qualify (DNPQ)
Black	Disqualified (DSQ)
White	Did not start (DNS)
White	Withdrew (WD)
White	Race cancelled (C)
Blank	Did not practice (DNP)
Blank	Did not arrive (DNA)
Blank	Excluded (EX)

==== Teams' championship ====
Pos	Team	Points
1	(Italy) Prema Powerteam	439.5
2	(Switzerland) Jenzer Motorsport	396
3	(Germany) Mücke Motorsport	236
4	(Portugal) DR Formula	202
5	(Italy) Bhaitech	165
6	(Italy) Vincenzo Sospiri Racing	139
7	(Switzerland) RB Racing	95.5
8	(Italy) Diegi Motorsport	86
9	(Italy) Antonelli Motorsport	83
10	(Italy) BVM Racing	75.5
11	(Italy) DRZ Benelli	43
12	(Italy) Cram Motorsport	20
13	(Italy) Kiteviola Motorsport	16
14	(Italy) GSK Grand Prix	4
15	(Italy) Torino Squadra Corse	4
16	(Italy) ADM Motorsport	2
