= 2019 FIA Motorsport Games Formula 4 Cup =

Motorsport event

Race details
Date	2-3 November
Official name	FIA Motorsport Games Formula 4 Cup
Location	Campagnano di Roma, Italy
Course	Permanent circuit 4.085 km (2.538 mi)
Distance	Qualifying; 20 minutes
- Qualifying Race

Pole
Driver	(Russia) Pavel Bulantsev	Team Russia
Time	1:49.256

Fastest lap
Driver	(Italy) Andrea Rosso	Team Italy
Time	1:36.471

Podium
First	(Israel) Ido Cohen	Team Israel
Second	(Italy) Andrea Rosso	Team Italy
Third	(Germany) Niklas Krütten	Team Germany
- Main race

Pole
Driver	(Israel) Ido Cohen	Team Israel

Fastest lap
Driver	(Germany) Niklas Krütten	Team Germany
Time	1:44.490

Medalists
1st place, gold medalist(s)	(Italy) Andrea Rosso	Team Italy
2nd place, silver medalist(s)	(Germany) Niklas Krütten	Team Germany
3rd place, bronze medalist(s)	(Finland) William Alatalo	Team Finland

The FIA Motorsport Games Formula 4 Cup was the first FIA Motorsport Games Formula 4 Cup, held at ACI Vallelunga Circuit, Italy on 1 November to 3 November 2019. The race was contested with identical Formula 4 cars. The event was part of the 2019 FIA Motorsport Games.

The event featured two 45-minute practice sessions on 1 November, with a 20-minute Qualifying session on 2 November for the Qualifying race, while the Main race was held on 3 November.

== Entry list ==
All drivers utilized KCMG KC MG-01 cars, which were operated by Hitech GP. It was the first Formula 4 car to feature Halo safety device.

Team	Entrant	No.	Drivers
Team Australia	CAMS	3	Luis Leeds
Team Belgium	RACB	4	Nicolas Baert
Team Brazil	CBA	5	Joao Rosate
Team Czech Republic	ACCR	6	Vaclav Safar
Team Germany	DMSB	7	Niklas Krütten
Team Denmark	DASU	8	Malthe Jakobsen
Team Spain	RFEDA	9	Belén García
Team Finland	AKK-Motorsport	10	William Alatalo
Team France	FFSA	11	Reshad de Gerus
Team Hong Kong	HKAA	12	Hugo Hung
Team Hungary	MNASZ	13	László Tóth
(Republic of Ireland) Team Ireland	Motorsport Ireland	14	Lucca Allen
Team Israel	MEMSI	15	Ido Cohen
Team Italy	ACI	16	Andrea Rosso
Team Japan	JAF	17	Kazuto Kotaka
Team Kuwait	KIAC	18	Mohammed Al Nusif
Team Malaysia	MAM	19	Jasper Thong
Team New Zealand	Motorsport New Zealand	20	Flynn Mullany
Team Portugal	FPAK	21	Mariano Pires
Team Russia	RAF	22	Pavel Bulantsev

== Results ==
=== Qualifying ===
Pos	No.	Driver	Team	Time	Gap	Grid
1	22	Pavel Bulantsev	Team Russia	1:49.256	—	1
2	15	Ido Cohen	Team Israel	1:49.752	+0.496	2
3	16	Andrea Rosso	Team Italy	1:49.916	+0.660	3
4	7	Niklas Krütten	Team Germany	1:50.055	+0.799	4
5	3	Luis Leeds	Team Australia	1:50.138	+0.882	5
6	5	João Rosate	Team Brazil	1:50.712	+1.456	6
7	17	Kazuto Kotaka	Team Japan	1:50.799	+1.543	7
8	8	Malthe Jakobsen	Team Denmark	1:50.877	+1.621	8
9	11	Reshad de Gerus	Team France	1:51.269	+2.013	9
10	10	William Alatalo	Team Finland	1:51.513	+2.257	10
11	4	Nicolas Baert	Team Belgium	1:51.598	+2.342	11
12	9	Belén García	Team Spain	1:52.129	+2.873	12
13	13	László Tóth	Team Hungary	1:52.889	+3.633	13
14	6	Vaclav Safar	Team Czech Republic	1:53.541	+4.285	14
15	14	Lucca Allen	(Republic of Ireland) Team Ireland	1:53.640	+4.384	15
16	19	Jasper Thong	Team Malaysia	1:55.487	+6.231	16
17	21	Mariano Pires	Team Portugal	1:56.117	+6.861	17
18	18	Mohammed Al Nusif	Team Kuwait	1:56.507	+7.251	18
107% qualifying time: 1:56.903
NC	20	Flynn Mullany	Team New Zealand	1:58.524	+9.268	19
DNQ	12	Hugo Hung	Team Hong Kong	no time	no time	20

=== Qualifying Race ===
Pos	No.	Driver	Team	Laps	Time/Retired	Grid
1	15	Ido Cohen	Team Israel	12	21:16.418	2
2	16	Andrea Rosso	Team Italy	12	+0.818	3
3	7	Niklas Krütten	Team Germany	12	+1.125	4
4	13	László Tóth	Team Hungary	12	+1.495	13
5	10	William Alatalo	Team Finland	12	+3.247	10
6	8	Malthe Jakobsen	Team Denmark	12	+3.570	8
7	4	Nicolas Baert	Team Belgium	12	+4.623	11
8	3	Luis Leeds	Team Australia	12	+4.988	5
9	22	Pavel Bulantsev	Team Russia	12	+7.408	1
10	11	Reshad de Gerus	Team France	12	+7.936	9
11	14	Lucca Allen	(Republic of Ireland) Team Ireland	12	+8.186	15
12	9	Belén García	Team Spain	12	+8.538	12
13	21	Mariano Pires	Team Portugal	12	+10.820	17
14	6	Vaclav Safar	Team Czech Republic	12	+12.948	14
15	19	Jasper Thong	Team Malaysia	12	+22.611	16
16	20	Flynn Mullany	Team New Zealand	12	+36.330	19
17	5	João Rosate	Team Brazil	11	+1 lap	6
NC	18	Mohammed Al Nusif	Team Kuwait	9	+4 laps	18
Ret	17	Kazuto Kotaka	Team Japan	1	Retired	7
Fastest lap: Andrea Rosso, 1:36.471, on lap 12

=== Main Race ===
Pos	No.	Driver	Team	Laps	Time/Retired	Grid
1st place, gold medalist(s)	16	Andrea Rosso	Team Italy	14	27:30.528	2
2nd place, silver medalist(s)	7	Niklas Krütten	Team Germany	14	+0.723	3
3rd place, bronze medalist(s)	10	William Alatalo	Team Finland	14	+4.923	5
4	3	Luis Leeds	Team Australia	14	+5.990	8
5	11	Reshad de Gerus	Team France	14	+6.773	10
6	9	Belén García	Team Spain	14	+7.061	12
7	13	László Tóth	Team Hungary	14	+7.748	4
8	14	Lucca Allen	(Republic of Ireland) Team Ireland	14	+9.702	11
9	5	João Rosate	Team Brazil	14	+11.741	17
10	18	Mohammed Al Nusif	Team Kuwait	14	+12.413	18
11	6	Vaclav Safar	Team Czech Republic	14	+13.282	14
12	21	Mariano Pires	Team Portugal	14	+14.104	13
13	15	Ido Cohen	Team Israel	14	+14.515	1
14	22	Pavel Bulantsev	Team Russia	14	+14.882	9
15	20	Flynn Mullany	Team New Zealand	14	+15.282	16
16	17	Kazuto Kotaka	Team Japan	13	+1 lap	19
17	8	Malthe Jakobsen	Team Denmark	13	+1 lap	6
18	19	Jasper Thong	Team Malaysia	13	+1 lap	15
Ret	4	Nicolas Baert	Team Belgium	9	Retired	7
Fastest lap: Niklas Krütten, 1:44.490, on lap 14
