= Niklas Krütten =

German racing driver (born 2002)

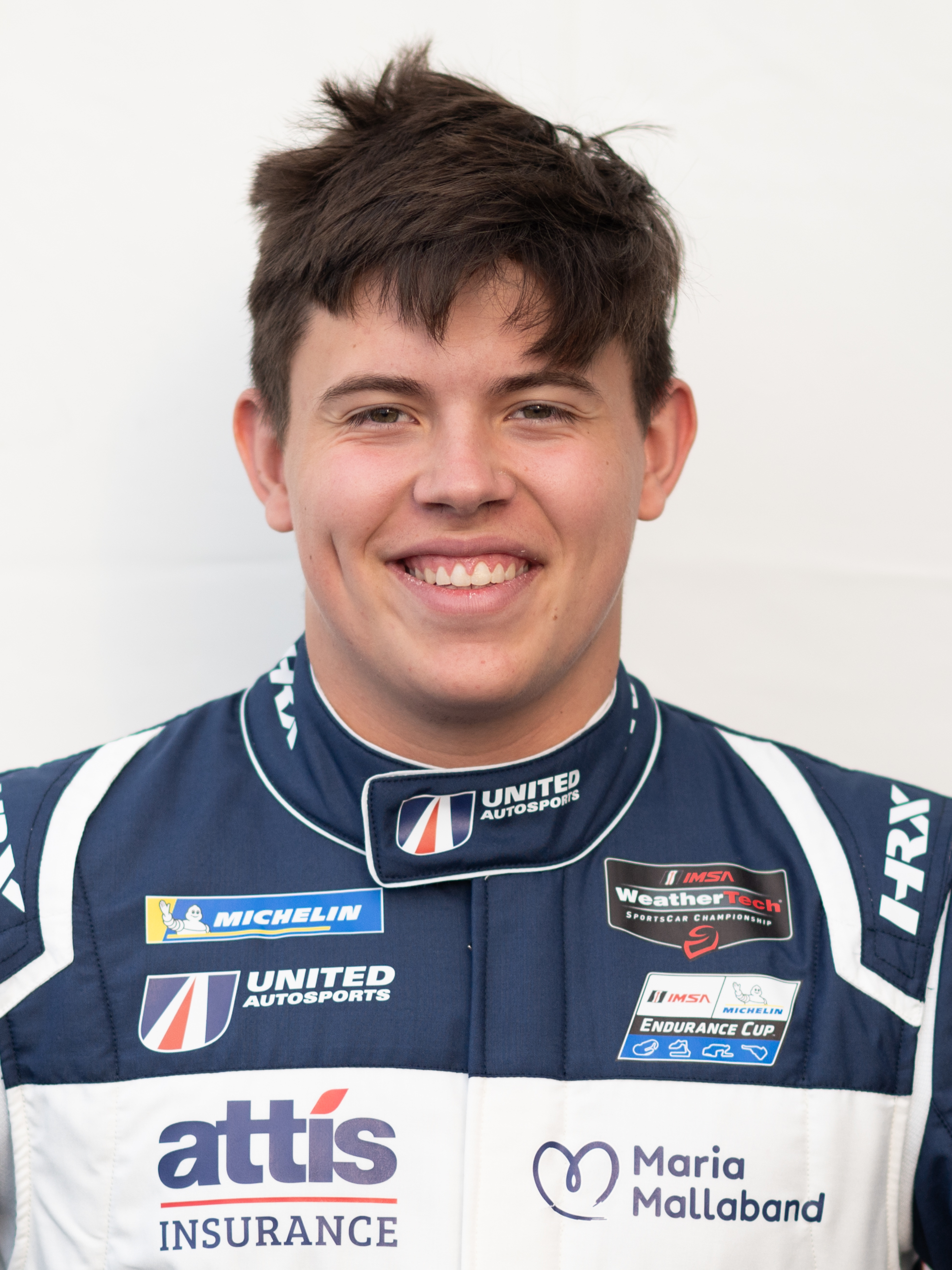
- Krütten in 2021
- Nationality: (Germany) German
- Born: 20 October 2002 (age 24) Trier, Germany

European Le Mans Series career
- Debut season: 2021
- Current team: Cool Racing
- Categorisation: FIA Silver (until 2022); FIA Gold (2023–)
- Car number: 19
- Starts: 6 (6 entries)
- Wins: 2
- Podiums: 4
- Poles: 0
- Fastest laps: 0
- Best finish: 2nd (in LMP3) in 2021

Previous series
- 2019–2020 2018–2019 2018–2019 2017–2019: Euroformula Open Championship; ADAC Formula 4 Italian F4 Championship; Formula 4 UAE Championship

Championship titles
- 2023 2023 2020: GTWC Europe – Gold; GTWC Europe Sprint Cup – Gold; EF Open – Rookies' championship
Medal record
Formula 4
Representing Germany
FIA Motorsport Games
| Silver medal – second place | 2019 Rome | Formula 4 Cup |

Niklas Krütten (born 20 October 2002) is a German racing driver who currently competes in Super GT driving a Ferrari 296 GT3 for Velorex. He has previously raced in single-seaters, LMP3 and LMP2, and was also the 2023 GT World Challenge Europe Gold Cup champion. Krütten is an ADAC Stiftung Sport alumnus.

== Career ==
2023 saw Krütten compete in the GT World Challenge Europe for the first time in his career. He would line up for Team WRT in both the Sprint Cup and Endurance Cup alongside Calan Williams, with Jean-Baptiste Simmenauer joining for the Endurance Cup.

== Racing record ==
=== Racing career summary ===
| Season | Series | Team | Races | Wins | Poles | F/Laps | Podiums | Points | Position |
|---|---|---|---|---|---|---|---|---|---|
| 2017–18 | Formula 4 UAE Championship | Mücke Motorsport | 8 | 0 | 0 | 1 | 1 | 64 | 11th |
| 2018 | ADAC Formula 4 Championship | BWT Mücke Motorsport | 20 | 1 | 0 | 0 | 3 | 108 | 8th |
| 2018 | Italian F4 Championship | BWT Mücke Motorsport | 21 | 0 | 0 | 0 | 0 | 43 | 13th |
| 2019 | Formula 4 UAE Championship | Mücke Motorsport | 4 | 1 | 0 | 1 | 1 | 0 | NC† |
| 2019 | ADAC Formula 4 Championship | Van Amersfoort Racing | 11 | 1 | 0 | 0 | 2 | 93 | 10th |
| 2019 | Italian F4 Championship | Van Amersfoort Racing | 11 | 0 | 1 | 0 | 4 | 78 | 11th |
| 2019 | Euroformula Open Championship | Team Motopark | 6 | 0 | 0 | 0 | 0 | 14 | 20th |
| 2019 | FIA Motorsport Games Formula 4 Cup | Team Germany | 1 | 0 | 0 | 1 | 1 | N/A | **2nd** |
| 2020 | Euroformula Open Championship | Team Motopark | 18 | 0 | 0 | 0 | 5 | 153 | 5th |
| 2021 | European Le Mans Series - LMP3 | Cool Racing | 6 | 2 | 0 | 0 | 4 | 104 | **2nd** |
| 2021 | Le Mans Cup - LMP3 | Cool Racing | 2 | 0 | 0 | 0 | 1 | 0 | NC† |
| 2021 | IMSA SportsCar Championship - LMP3 | WIN Autosport | 1 | 0 | 0 | 0 | 0 | 854 | 12th |
| 2021 | IMSA SportsCar Championship - LMP3 | United Autosports | 2 | 0 | 1 | 0 | 0 | 854 | 12th |
| 2021 | Nürburgring Endurance Series - M240i | Adrenalin Motorsport Team Alzner Automotive | 2 | 0 | 1 | 0 | 1 | ? | ? |
| 2022 | European Le Mans Series - LMP2 | Cool Racing | 6 | 0 | 0 | 0 | 3 | 70 | 5th |
| 2022 | 24 Hours of Le Mans - LMP2 | Cool Racing | 1 | 0 | 0 | 0 | 0 | N/A | 7th |
| 2022 | ADAC GT Masters | Schubert Motorsport | 12 | 2 | 1 | 2 | 2 | 107 | 9th |
| 2022 | 24 Hours of Nürburgring - SP9 | Schubert Motorsport | 1 | 0 | 0 | 0 | 0 | N/A | DNF |
| 2023 | GT World Challenge Europe | Team WRT | 15 | 0 | 0 | 0 | 1 | 18.5 | 29th |
| 2023 | GT World Challenge Europe - Gold Cup | Team WRT | 15 | 4 | 1 | 1 | 9 | 191.5 | **1st** |
| 2023 | GT World Challenge Europe Endurance Cup | Team WRT | 5 | 0 | 0 | 0 | 0 | 0 | NC |
| 2023 | GT World Challenge Europe Endurance Cup - Gold Cup | Team WRT | 5 | 0 | 0 | 0 | 3 | 78 | 5th |
| 2023 | GT World Challenge Europe Sprint Cup | Team WRT | 10 | 0 | 0 | 0 | 1 | 18.5 | 9th |
| 2023 | GT World Challenge Europe Sprint Cup - Gold Cup | Team WRT | 10 | 4 | 1 | 1 | 6 | 113.5 | **1st** |
| 2023 | Intercontinental GT Challenge | Team WRT | 1 | 0 | 0 | 0 | 0 | 4 | 28th |
| 2024 | Super GT - GT300 | BMW M Team Studie x CRS | 8 | 0 | 0 | 0 | 1 | 43 | 5th |
| 2025 | International GT Open | Team Motopark | 7 | 0 | 0 | 0 | 0 | 12 | 19th |
| 2026 | Super GT - GT300 | Velorex | 8 | 0 | 0 | 0 | 0 | 32 | 22nd |

^{†} As Krütten was a guest driver, he was ineligible to score points.
* Season still in progress.

=== Complete Formula 4 UAE Championship results ===
(key) (Races in bold indicate pole position) (Races in italics indicate fastest lap)

| Year | Team | 1 | 2 | 3 | 4 | 5 | 6 | 7 | 8 | 9 | 10 | 11 | 12 | 13 | 14 | 15 | 16 | 17 | 18 | 19 | 20 | 21 | 22 | 23 | 24 | Pos | Points |
|---|---|---|---|---|---|---|---|---|---|---|---|---|---|---|---|---|---|---|---|---|---|---|---|---|---|---|---|
| 2017-18 | Mücke Motorsport | YMC1; 1 | YMC1; 2 | YMC1; 3 | YMC1; 4 | YMC2; 1 | YMC2; 2 | YMC2; 3 | YMC2; 4 | DUB1; 1 | DUB1; 2 | DUB1; 3 | DUB1; 4 | YMC3; 1; 8 | YMC3; 2; 11 | YMC3; 3; 4 | YMC3; 4; 7 | YMC4; 1; 8 | YMC4; 2; 7 | YMC4; 3; 4 | YMC4; 4; 2 | DUB2; 1 | DUB2; 2 | DUB2; 3 | DUB2; 4 | 11th | 64 |
| 2019 | Mücke Motorsport | DUB1; 1 | DUB1; 2 | DUB1; 3 | DUB1; 4 | YMC1; 1 | YMC1; 2 | YMC1; 3 | YMC1; 4 | DUB2; 1 | DUB2; 2 | DUB2; 3 | DUB2; 4 | YMC2; 1 | YMC2; 2 | YMC2; 3 | YMC2; 4 | DUB3; 1; 5 | DUB3; 2; 1 | DUB3; 3 DSQ | DUB3; 4 DSQ | | | | | NC | — |

=== Complete ADAC Formula 4 Championship results ===
(key) (Races in bold indicate pole position) (Races in italics indicate fastest lap)

| Year | Team | 1 | 2 | 3 | 4 | 5 | 6 | 7 | 8 | 9 | 10 | 11 | 12 | 13 | 14 | 15 | 16 | 17 | 18 | 19 | 20 | Pos | Points |
|---|---|---|---|---|---|---|---|---|---|---|---|---|---|---|---|---|---|---|---|---|---|---|---|
| 2018 | ADAC Berlin-Brandenburg | OSC; 1; 9 | OSC; 2; 9 | OSC; 3; 5 | HOC1; 1 Ret | HOC1; 2; 8 | HOC1; 3; 2 | LAU; 1 Ret | LAU; 2; 12 | LAU; 3; 8 | RBR; 1; 12 | RBR; 2; 7 | RBR; 3; 3 | HOC2; 1 Ret | HOC2; 2; 9 | NÜR; 1; 9 | NÜR; 2; 7 | NÜR; 3; 1 | HOC3; 1; 12 | HOC3; 2; 8 | HOC3; 3; 7 | 8th | 108 |
| 2019 | Van Amersfoort Racing | OSC; 1; 4 | OSC; 2; 1 | OSC; 3; 8 | RBR; 1; 8 | RBR; 2; 8 | RBR; 3; 2 | HOC; 1 Ret | HOC; 2; 7 | ZAN; 1; 8 | ZAN; 2; 9 | ZAN; 3; 4 | NÜR; 1 | NÜR; 2 | NÜR; 3 | HOC; 1 | HOC; 2 | HOC; 3 | SAC; 1 | SAC; 2 | SAC; 3 | 10th | 93 |

=== Complete Italian F4 Championship results ===
(key) (Races in bold indicate pole position) (Races in italics indicate fastest lap)

| Year | Team | 1 | 2 | 3 | 4 | 5 | 6 | 7 | 8 | 9 | 10 | 11 | 12 | 13 | 14 | 15 | 16 | 17 | 18 | 19 | 20 | 21 | 22 | Pos | Points |
|---|---|---|---|---|---|---|---|---|---|---|---|---|---|---|---|---|---|---|---|---|---|---|---|---|---|
| 2018 | BWT Mücke Motorsport | ADR; 1; 22 | ADR; 2 Ret | ADR; 3; 11 | LEC; 1; 8 | LEC; 2; 29 | LEC; 3; 16 | MNZ; 1; 10 | MNZ; 2 Ret | MNZ; 3; 7 | MIS; 1 Ret | MIS; 2; 9 | MIS; 3; 21 | IMO; 1; 7 | IMO; 2; 8 | IMO; 3; 7 | VLL; 1; 6 | VLL; 2; 15 | VLL; 3; 12 | MUG; 1; 7 | MUG; 2 Ret | MUG; 3; 11 | | 13th | 43 |
| 2019 | Van Amersfoort Racing | VLL; 1; 27 | VLL; 2; 8 | VLL; 3; 30 | MIS; 1; 3 | MIS; 2; 2 | MIS; 3 C | HUN; 1 Ret | HUN; 2; 8 | HUN; 3; 10 | RBR; 1; 2 | **RBR**; **2**; 2 | RBR; 3; 27 | IMO; 1 | IMO; 2 | IMO; 3 | IMO; 4 | MUG; 1 | MUG; 2 | MUG; 3 | MNZ; 1 | MNZ; 2 | MNZ; 3 | 11th | 78 |

=== Complete FIA Motorsport Games results ===
| Year | Entrant | Cup | Qualifying | Quali Race | Main race |
|---|---|---|---|---|---|
| 2019 | Team Germany | **Formula 4** | 4th | **3rd** | **2nd** |

=== Complete Euroformula Open Championship results ===
(key) (Races in bold indicate pole position) (Races in italics indicate fastest lap)

| Year | Team | 1 | 2 | 3 | 4 | 5 | 6 | 7 | 8 | 9 | 10 | 11 | 12 | 13 | 14 | 15 | 16 | 17 | 18 | Pos | Points |
|---|---|---|---|---|---|---|---|---|---|---|---|---|---|---|---|---|---|---|---|---|---|
| 2019 | Team Motopark | LEC; 1 | LEC; 2 | PAU; 1 | PAU; 2 | HOC; 1 | HOC; 2 | SPA; 1 | SPA; 2 | HUN; 1 | HUN; 2 | RBR; 1 | RBR; 2 | SIL; 1; 8 | SIL; 2; 8 | CAT; 1; 12 | CAT; 2; 11 | MNZ; 1; 8 | MNZ; 2; 11 | 20th | 14 |
| 2020 | Team Motopark | HUN; 1; 8 | HUN; 2 (10) | LEC; 1; 5 | LEC; 2; 6 | RBR; 1; 8 | RBR; 2; 3 | MNZ; 1; 3 | MNZ; 2; 3 | MNZ; 3; 3 | MUG; 1; 4 | MUG; 2; 4 | SPA; 1; 12 | SPA; 2; 6 | SPA; 3; 5 | CAT; 1; 3 | CAT; 2; 7 | CAT; 3; 8 | CAT; 4 (9) | 5th | 153 |

=== Complete IMSA SportsCar Championship results ===
(key) (Races in bold indicate pole position) (Races in italics indicate fastest lap)

| Year | Entrant | Class | Chassis | Engine | 1 | 2 | 3 | 4 | 5 | 6 | 7 | Pos. | Points |
|---|---|---|---|---|---|---|---|---|---|---|---|---|---|
| 2021 | WIN Autosport | LMP3 | Duqueine M30 - D08 | Nissan VK56DE 5.6 L V8 | DAY | SEB; 6 | MDO | | | | | 12th | 854 |
| 2021 | United Autosports | LMP3 | Ligier JS P320 | Nissan VK56DE 5.6 L V8 | | | | WGL; 5 | WGL | ELK | **PET**; 6 | 12th | 854 |

=== Complete European Le Mans Series results ===
(key) (Races in bold indicate pole position; results in italics indicate fastest lap)

| Year | Entrant | Class | Chassis | Engine | 1 | 2 | 3 | 4 | 5 | 6 | Rank | Points |
|---|---|---|---|---|---|---|---|---|---|---|---|---|
| 2021 | Cool Racing | LMP3 | Ligier JS P320 | Nissan VK56DE 5.6L V8 | CAT; 1 | RBR; 1 | LEC; 2 | MNZ; 4 | SPA; 2 | ALG; 8 | 2nd | 104 |
| 2022 | Cool Racing | LMP2 | Oreca 07 | Gibson GK428 4.2 L V8 | LEC; 5 | IMO; 3 | MNZ; 8 | CAT; 3 | SPA; 5 | ALG; 3 | 5th | 70 |

=== Complete 24 Hours of Le Mans results ===
| Year | Team | Co-Drivers | Car | Class | Laps | Pos. | Class Pos. |
|---|---|---|---|---|---|---|---|
| 2022 | (Switzerland) Cool Racing | (United States) Ricky Taylor (China) Yifei Ye | Oreca 07-Gibson | LMP2 | 367 | 11th | 7th |

=== Complete ADAC GT Masters results ===
(key) (Races in bold indicate pole position) (Races in italics indicate fastest lap)

| Year | Team | Car | 1 | 2 | 3 | 4 | 5 | 6 | 7 | 8 | 9 | 10 | 11 | 12 | 13 | 14 | DC | Points |
|---|---|---|---|---|---|---|---|---|---|---|---|---|---|---|---|---|---|---|
| 2022 | Schubert Motorsport | BMW M4 GT3 | OSC; 1; 10 | OSC; 2; 16 | RBR; 1; 1^{3} | **RBR**; **2**; 1^{1} | ZAN; 1; 18† | ZAN; 2; 11 | NÜR; 1; 10 | NÜR; 2; 11^{2} | LAU; 1; 11 | LAU; 2; 9 | SAC; 1 | SAC; 2 | HOC; 1; 7 | HOC; 2; 9 | 9th | 107 |

=== Complete GT World Challenge Europe results ===
==== GT World Challenge Europe Endurance Cup ====
| Year | Team | Car | Class | 1 | 2 | 3 | 4 | 5 | 6 | 7 | Pos. | Points |
|---|---|---|---|---|---|---|---|---|---|---|---|---|
| 2023 | BMW M Team WRT | BMW M4 GT3 | Gold | MNZ; 12 | LEC; Ret | SPA; 6H; 20 | SPA; 12H; 18 | SPA; 24H; 14 | NÜR; 16 | CAT; 21 | 5th | 78 |

^{*} Season still in progress.

==== GT World Challenge Europe Sprint Cup ====
| Year | Team | Car | Class | 1 | 2 | 3 | 4 | 5 | 6 | 7 | 8 | 9 | 10 | Pos. | Points |
|---|---|---|---|---|---|---|---|---|---|---|---|---|---|---|---|
| 2023 | BMW M Team WRT | BMW M4 GT3 | Gold | BRH; 1; 15 | BRH; 2; 7 | MIS; 1; 11 | MIS; 2; 11 | HOC; 1; 5 | HOC; 2; 30 | VAL; 1 Ret | VAL; 2; 18 | ZAN; 1; 13 | **ZAN**; **2**; 3 | 1st | 113.5 |

^{*} Season still in progress.

=== Complete Super GT results ===
(key) (Races in bold indicate pole position; races in italics indicate fastest lap)

| Year | Team | Car | Class | 1 | 2 | 3 | 4 | 5 | 6 | 7 | 8 | DC | Points |
|---|---|---|---|---|---|---|---|---|---|---|---|---|---|
| 2024 | BMW M Team Studie × CRS | BMW M4 GT3 | GT300 | OKA; 3 | FUJ; 11 | SUZ; 7 | FUJ; 7 | SUG; 4 | AUT; 4 | MOT; 5^{2} | SUZ; 13 | 5th | 43 |
| 2026 | Velorex | Ferrari 296 GT3 | GT300 | OKA; 9 | FUJ; 23 | | | | | | | 22nd | 32 |
| 2026 | Velorex | Ferrari 296 GT3 Evo | GT300 | | | FUJ; 9 | SUZ; 18 | SUG; 9 | AUT; 11 | MOT; 10 | MOT; 17 | 22nd | 32 |

^{*} Season still in progress.

=== Complete International GT Open results ===
| Year | Team | Car | Class | 1 | 2 | 3 | 4 | 5 | 6 | 7 | 8 | 9 | 10 | 11 | 12 | 13 | 14 | Pos. | Points |
|---|---|---|---|---|---|---|---|---|---|---|---|---|---|---|---|---|---|---|---|
| 2025 | Team Motopark | Mercedes-AMG GT3 Evo | Pro | PRT; 1; 9 | PRT; 2; 13 | SPA; 6 | HOC; 1; 17 | HOC; 2 Ret | HUN; 1; 12 | HUN; 2; 15 | LEC; 1 | LEC; 2 | RBR; 1 | RBR; 2 | CAT; 1 | CAT; 2 | MNZ | 19th | 12 |
