= German Automobile Club =

German Automobile Club might refer to

- ADAC, founded in 1903, largest automobile club in Europe
- Automobilclub von Deutschland, founded in 1899, organizer of the German Grand Prix
