= Monisha Kaltenborn =

Austrian Formula One executive (born 1971)

- Born: Monisha Narang; 10 May 1971 (age 55); Dehradun, India
- Education: University of Vienna; London School of Economics
- Known for: Team Principal & CEO of the Sauber F1 Team
- Spouse: Jens Kaltenborn
- Children: 2

Monisha Kaltenborn-Narang (née Narang; born 10 May 1971) is the Austrian former team principal of the Sauber Formula One team. She held a 33.3% stake in the outfit, until it was taken over by Longbow Finance S.A. in July 2016. She was the team's chief executive officer from January 2010 until 22 June 2017. She was the first female team principal in Formula One.

== Career ==
Kaltenborn was born in Dehradun, India. Her family emigrated to Vienna when she was a child, and she took Austrian citizenship. From 1990 to 1995 she studied for a law degree at the University of Vienna. She then studied at London School of Economics and was awarded master's degree in International Business Law from University of London in 1996. Whilst still a student in Vienna, she worked for the United Nations Industrial Development Organization and the UN Commission for International Trade Law, and on completion of her studies she worked for various legal firms: first in Stuttgart with Gleiss Lutz; then back in Vienna with Wolf & Theis; and finally for the Fritz Kaiser Group in 1998–1999.

At this stage, Kaiser was a co-owner of the Sauber Formula One team (along with founder and team principal Peter Sauber and Red Bull owner Dietrich Mateschitz), and Kaltenborn was employed to take charge of the team's corporate and legal affairs. By 2000, Kaiser had sold his shares, but Kaltenborn remained with the team as the head of its legal department. From 2001, she has been a member of its management board, and in early 2010, following the team's return to independent status following the withdrawal of former partner BMW, she was appointed CEO of Sauber Motorsport AG. She is also involved in the FIA's Commission for Women and Motorsport, under Michèle Mouton. On 16 May 2012, Peter Sauber transferred a third of the Sauber team to Kaltenborn, making her a part owner. In October, he retired from front-line management of the team, handing her the role of team principal.

On 22 June 2017 Sauber F1 Team confirmed Kaltenborn would be leaving the Sauber Group effective immediately through a statement on their website:

Longbow Finance SA regrets to announce that, by mutual consent and due to diverging views of the future of the company, Monisha Kaltenborn will leave her positions with the Sauber Group effective immediately. We thank her for many years of strong leadership, great passion for the Sauber F1 Team and wish her the very best for the future. Her successor will be announced shortly; in the meantime we wish the team the best of luck in Azerbaijan.

In February 2018, Kaltenborn made a return to motorsport with the founding of KDC Racing, which made its racing debut in the Italian and ADAC Formula 4 championships. KDC is a fifty-fifty venture between Kaltenborn - the 'K' of the team's name - and French-Monegasque businesswoman Emily di Comberti, whose son Aaron competed in the BRDC British Formula 3 Championship in 2017.

== Personal life ==
In her first job in Stuttgart, Monisha met Jens Kaltenborn and later married him in Dehradun.

== Sources ==
- "Monisha Kaltenborn". fia.com. Fédération Internationale de l'Automobile.
- "Monisha Kaltenborn". sauberf1team.com. Sauber F1 Team. Archived from the original on 20 October 2011.
