= KDC Racing =

(Switzerland) KDC Racing
- Founded: 2018
- Folded: 2018
- Base: Switzerland
- Team principal(s): Monisha Kaltenborn
- Former series: Italian F4 Championship; ADAC Formula 4

KDC Racing was a Swiss auto racing team. KDC Racing was established in February 2018 by Monisha Kaltenborn after leaving the Sauber Formula One team, however the team rapidly went bankrupt.

== History ==
KDC Racing was a partnership between Monisha Kalternborn and her business partner Emily di Comberti with the name KDC being derived from the initials of their surnames.

Although the team competed under a Swiss license the team was based in Granollers, which is near to the Circuit de Catalunya.

Aaron di Comberti and Leonardo Lorandi competed in 3 rounds of the 2018 ADAC Formula 4 Championship and Aaron di Comberti, Ilya Morozov and Toby Sowery competed in 2 rounds of the 2018 Italian Formula 4 Championship.

Soon after commencing operations the team was declared bankrupt in 2017 events with that team.

== Former series results ==
=== ADAC F4 Championship ===
Year	Car	Drivers	Races	Wins	Poles	Fast laps	Points	D.C.	T.C.
2018	Tatuus F4-T014	(United Kingdom) Aaron di Comberti	9	0	0	0	6	20th	7th
2018	Tatuus F4-T014	(Italy) Leonardo Lorandi	9	0	0	0	14	17th	7th

=== Italian F4 Championship ===
Year	Car	Drivers	Races	Wins	Poles	Fast laps	Points	D.C.	T.C.
2018	Tatuus F4-T014	(United Kingdom) Aaron di Comberti	6	0	0	0	0	37th	
2018	Tatuus F4-T014	(Russia) Ilya Morozov	18	0	0	0	15	19th†	
2018	Tatuus F4-T014	(United Kingdom) Toby Sowery	6	0	0	0	54	12th	

†Morozov competed for Cram Motorsport in from round 4 to round 6 and for Bhaitech in round 7.

== Timeline ==
Former series
ADAC Formula 4	2018
Italian Formula 4 Championship	2018
