= 2023 GT World Challenge Europe =

Motorsport events in Europe

The 2023 Fanatec GT World Challenge Europe Powered by AWS was the tenth season of GT World Challenge Europe. The season began at Monza on 23 April and ended at Zandvoort on 15 October. The season consisted of 10 events: 5 Sprint Cup events, and 5 Endurance Cup events.

== Calendar ==
Round	Circuit	Date	Series
1	Autodromo Nazionale Monza, Monza, Italy	22–23 April	Endurance
2	(United Kingdom) Brands Hatch, Kent	13–14 May	Sprint
3	Circuit Paul Ricard, Le Castellet, France	3–4 June	Endurance
4	Circuit de Spa-Francorchamps, Stavelot, Belgium	29 June–2 July	Endurance
5	(Italy) Misano World Circuit Marco Simoncelli, Misano Adriatico	15–16 July	Sprint
6	Nürburgring, Nürburg, Germany	29–30 July	Endurance
7	(Germany) Hockenheimring, Hockenheim	2–3 September	Sprint
8	(Spain) Circuit Ricardo Tormo, Cheste	16–17 September	Sprint
9	Circuit de Barcelona-Catalunya, Montmeló, Spain	30 September–1 October	Endurance
10	(Netherlands) Circuit Zandvoort, Zandvoort	14–15 October	Sprint

== Entry list ==
=== Endurance Cup ===
Team	Car	No.	Drivers	Class	Rounds
(Germany) GetSpeed	Mercedes-AMG GT3 Evo	2	(Poland) Andrzej Lewandowski	PA	All
(Germany) GetSpeed	Mercedes-AMG GT3 Evo	2	(United Kingdom) Aaron Walker	PA	All
(Germany) GetSpeed	Mercedes-AMG GT3 Evo	2	(United States) Lance Bergstein	PA	1–4
(Germany) GetSpeed	Mercedes-AMG GT3 Evo	2	(United Kingdom) Lewis Williamson	PA	3
(Germany) GetSpeed	Mercedes-AMG GT3 Evo	2	(Germany) Adam Osieka	PA	5
(Germany) GetSpeed	Mercedes-AMG GT3 Evo	3	(Germany) Patrick Assenheimer	B	All
(Germany) GetSpeed	Mercedes-AMG GT3 Evo	3	(Germany) Florian Scholze	B	All
(Germany) GetSpeed	Mercedes-AMG GT3 Evo	3	(Australia) Alex Peroni	B	1–4
(Germany) GetSpeed	Mercedes-AMG GT3 Evo	3	(Germany) Kenneth Heyer	B	3
(Germany) GetSpeed	Mercedes-AMG GT3 Evo	3	(Austria) Lucas Auer	B	5
(Oman) Mercedes-AMG Team AlManar	Mercedes-AMG GT3 Evo	777	(Germany) Fabian Schiller	P	All
(Oman) Mercedes-AMG Team AlManar	Mercedes-AMG GT3 Evo	777	(Germany) Luca Stolz	P	All
(Oman) Mercedes-AMG Team AlManar	Mercedes-AMG GT3 Evo	777	(Germany) Maro Engel	P	1–2, 4–5
(Oman) Mercedes-AMG Team AlManar	Mercedes-AMG GT3 Evo	777	(Austria) Lucas Auer	P	3
(United States) CrowdStrike Racing by Riley	Mercedes-AMG GT3 Evo	4	(United States) Colin Braun	PA	3
(United States) CrowdStrike Racing by Riley	Mercedes-AMG GT3 Evo	4	(Brazil) Felipe Fraga	PA	3
(United States) CrowdStrike Racing by Riley	Mercedes-AMG GT3 Evo	4	(United Kingdom) Ian James	PA	3
(United States) CrowdStrike Racing by Riley	Mercedes-AMG GT3 Evo	4	(United States) George Kurtz	PA	3
(United Kingdom) Optimum Motorsport	McLaren 720S GT3 Evo	5	(United Kingdom) Sam De Haan	G	All
(United Kingdom) Optimum Motorsport	McLaren 720S GT3 Evo	5	(United Kingdom) Charlie Fagg	G	All
(United Kingdom) Optimum Motorsport	McLaren 720S GT3 Evo	5	(United Kingdom) Dean MacDonald	G	All
(United Kingdom) Optimum Motorsport	McLaren 720S GT3 Evo	5	(United Kingdom) Tom Gamble	G	3
(United Kingdom) Inception Racing	McLaren 720S GT3 Evo	7	(United States) Brendan Iribe	B	3
(United Kingdom) Inception Racing	McLaren 720S GT3 Evo	7	(United Kingdom) Ollie Millroy	B	3
(United Kingdom) Inception Racing	McLaren 720S GT3 Evo	7	(Spain) Fran Rueda	B	3
(United Kingdom) Inception Racing	McLaren 720S GT3 Evo	7	(Denmark) Frederik Schandorff	B	3
(United States) K-PAX Racing	Lamborghini Huracán GT3 Evo 2	6	(Italy) Marco Mapelli	P	All
(United States) K-PAX Racing	Lamborghini Huracán GT3 Evo 2	6	(United Kingdom) Sandy Mitchell	P	All
(United States) K-PAX Racing	Lamborghini Huracán GT3 Evo 2	6	(France) Franck Perera	P	All
(France) AGS Events	Lamborghini Huracán GT3 Evo 2	8	(Switzerland) Antonin Borga	B	1–4
(France) AGS Events	Lamborghini Huracán GT3 Evo 2	8	(Italy) Leonardo Gorini	B	1–4
(France) AGS Events	Lamborghini Huracán GT3 Evo 2	8	(France) Nico Jamin	B	1–4
(Belgium) Boutsen VDS	Audi R8 LMS Evo II	9	(Italy) Alberto Di Folco	G	All
(Belgium) Boutsen VDS	Audi R8 LMS Evo II	9	(France) Adam Eteki	G	All
(Belgium) Boutsen VDS	Audi R8 LMS Evo II	9	(France) Aurélien Panis	G	All
(Belgium) Boutsen VDS	Audi R8 LMS Evo II	9	(France) Thomas Laurent	G	3
(Belgium) Boutsen VDS	Audi R8 LMS Evo II	10	(Italy) Andrea Cola	S	All
(Belgium) Boutsen VDS	Audi R8 LMS Evo II	10	(France) César Gazeau	S	All
(Belgium) Boutsen VDS	Audi R8 LMS Evo II	10	(Israel) Roee Meyuhas	S	All
(Belgium) Boutsen VDS	Audi R8 LMS Evo II	10	(France) Loris Cabirou	S	3
(Belgium) / Audi Sport Team Comtoyou (Note: Car No. 11 entered as Comtoyou Racing at rounds 1–2 and 4–5, and as Audi Sport Team Comtoyou at round 3. Cars No. 12 and No. 21 entered as Comtoyou Racing at all rounds.); (Belgium) / Comtoyou Racing	Audi R8 LMS Evo II	11	(Germany) Christopher Haase	P	All
(Belgium) / Audi Sport Team Comtoyou; (Belgium) / Comtoyou Racing	Audi R8 LMS Evo II	11	(Belgium) Frédéric Vervisch	P	All
(Belgium) / Audi Sport Team Comtoyou; (Belgium) / Comtoyou Racing	Audi R8 LMS Evo II	11	(Belgium) Gilles Magnus	P	1–3, 5
(Belgium) / Audi Sport Team Comtoyou; (Belgium) / Comtoyou Racing	Audi R8 LMS Evo II	11	(Belgium) Kobe Pauwels	P	4
(Belgium) / Audi Sport Team Comtoyou; (Belgium) / Comtoyou Racing	Audi R8 LMS Evo II	12	(Belgium) Sam Dejonghe	S	All
(Belgium) / Audi Sport Team Comtoyou; (Belgium) / Comtoyou Racing	Audi R8 LMS Evo II	12	(Netherlands) Loris Hezemans	S	All
(Belgium) / Audi Sport Team Comtoyou; (Belgium) / Comtoyou Racing	Audi R8 LMS Evo II	12	(United Kingdom) Finlay Hutchison	S	All
(Belgium) / Audi Sport Team Comtoyou; (Belgium) / Comtoyou Racing	Audi R8 LMS Evo II	12	(Switzerland) Lucas Légeret	S	3
(Belgium) / Audi Sport Team Comtoyou; (Belgium) / Comtoyou Racing	Audi R8 LMS Evo II	21	(Belgium) Nicolas Baert	G	All
(Belgium) / Audi Sport Team Comtoyou; (Belgium) / Comtoyou Racing	Audi R8 LMS Evo II	21	(Belgium) Maxime Soulet	G	All
(Belgium) / Audi Sport Team Comtoyou; (Belgium) / Comtoyou Racing	Audi R8 LMS Evo II	21	(Austria) Max Hofer	G	1–3, 5
(Belgium) / Audi Sport Team Comtoyou; (Belgium) / Comtoyou Racing	Audi R8 LMS Evo II	21	(Belgium) Gilles Magnus	G	4
(Italy) BMW Italia Ceccato Racing	BMW M4 GT3	15	(Italy) Marco Cassarà	PA	1
(Italy) BMW Italia Ceccato Racing	BMW M4 GT3	15	(Italy) Stefano Comandini	PA	1
(Italy) BMW Italia Ceccato Racing	BMW M4 GT3	15	(Italy) Francesco Guerra	PA	1
(China) Uno Racing Team	Audi R8 LMS Evo II	16	(Hong Kong) Adderly Fong	PA	3
(China) Uno Racing Team	Audi R8 LMS Evo II	16	(China) Xiaole He	PA	3
(China) Uno Racing Team	Audi R8 LMS Evo II	16	(China) Junlin Pan	PA	3
(China) Uno Racing Team	Audi R8 LMS Evo II	16	(Hong Kong) "Rio"	PA	3
(Germany) Scherer Sport PHX	Audi R8 LMS Evo II	17	(Germany) Luca Engstler	P	3
(Germany) Scherer Sport PHX	Audi R8 LMS Evo II	17	(South Africa) Kelvin van der Linde	P	3
(Germany) Scherer Sport PHX	Audi R8 LMS Evo II	17	(Denmark) Nicki Thiim	P	3
(Italy) Iron Lynx	Lamborghini Huracán GT3 Evo 2	19	(Italy) Michele Beretta	G	All
(Italy) Iron Lynx	Lamborghini Huracán GT3 Evo 2	19	(Italy) Leonardo Pulcini	G	All
(Italy) Iron Lynx	Lamborghini Huracán GT3 Evo 2	19	(Switzerland) Rolf Ineichen	G	1–4
(Italy) Iron Lynx	Lamborghini Huracán GT3 Evo 2	19	(France) Pierre-Louis Chovet	G	5
(Italy) Iron Lynx	Lamborghini Huracán GT3 Evo 2	63	(Italy) Mirko Bortolotti	P	All
(Italy) Iron Lynx	Lamborghini Huracán GT3 Evo 2	63	(Italy) Andrea Caldarelli	P	All
(Italy) Iron Lynx	Lamborghini Huracán GT3 Evo 2	63	(South Africa) Jordan Pepper	P	All
(Italy) Iron Dames	Lamborghini Huracán GT3 Evo 2	83	(Belgium) Sarah Bovy	B	All
(Italy) Iron Dames	Lamborghini Huracán GT3 Evo 2	83	(Switzerland) Rahel Frey	B	All
(Italy) Iron Dames	Lamborghini Huracán GT3 Evo 2	83	(Denmark) Michelle Gatting	B	All
(Italy) Iron Dames	Lamborghini Huracán GT3 Evo 2	83	(France) Doriane Pin	B	3
(Germany) Huber Motorsport	Porsche 911 GT3 R (992)	20	(Hong Kong) Antares Au	B	3
(Germany) Huber Motorsport	Porsche 911 GT3 R (992)	20	(Italy) Matteo Cairoli	B	3
(Germany) Huber Motorsport	Porsche 911 GT3 R (992)	20	(Germany) Jannes Fittje	B	3
(Germany) Huber Motorsport	Porsche 911 GT3 R (992)	20	(Germany) Tim Heinemann	B	3
(France) CLRT	Porsche 911 GT3 R (992)	22	(France) Dorian Boccolacci	PA	2
(France) CLRT	Porsche 911 GT3 R (992)	22	(France) Emil Caumes	PA	2
(France) CLRT	Porsche 911 GT3 R (992)	22	(France) Stéphane Denoual	PA	2
(France) CLRT	Porsche 911 GT3 R (992)	44	(France) Clément Mateu	B	All
(France) CLRT	Porsche 911 GT3 R (992)	44	(France) Steven Palette	B	All
(France) CLRT	Porsche 911 GT3 R (992)	44	(France) Hugo Chevalier	B	1–3
(France) CLRT	Porsche 911 GT3 R (992)	44	(France) Frédéric Makowiecki	B	3–5
(Australia) Grove Racing	Porsche 911 GT3 R (992)	23	(New Zealand) Earl Bamber	B	3
(Australia) Grove Racing	Porsche 911 GT3 R (992)	23	(Australia) Brenton Grove	B	3
(Australia) Grove Racing	Porsche 911 GT3 R (992)	23	(Australia) Stephen Grove	B	3
(Australia) Grove Racing	Porsche 911 GT3 R (992)	23	(Australia) Anton de Pasquale	B	3
(Germany) Car Collection Motorsport	Porsche 911 GT3 R (992)	24	(Switzerland) Alex Fontana	PA	All
(Germany) Car Collection Motorsport	Porsche 911 GT3 R (992)	24	(Switzerland) Ivan Jacoma	PA	All
(Germany) Car Collection Motorsport	Porsche 911 GT3 R (992)	24	(Switzerland) Nicolas Leutwiler	PA	All
(Germany) Car Collection Motorsport	Porsche 911 GT3 R (992)	24	(Germany) Nico Menzel	PA	3
(United States) GMG Racing by Car Collection Motorsport	Porsche 911 GT3 R (992)	132	(Netherlands) Jeroen Bleekemolen	PA	3
(United States) GMG Racing by Car Collection Motorsport	Porsche 911 GT3 R (992)	132	(United States) Patrick Long	PA	3
(United States) GMG Racing by Car Collection Motorsport	Porsche 911 GT3 R (992)	132	(United States) James Sofronas	PA	3
(United States) GMG Racing by Car Collection Motorsport	Porsche 911 GT3 R (992)	132	(United States) Kyle Washington	PA	3
(France) / Audi Sport Team Saintéloc (Note: Car No. 25 entered as Saintéloc Junior Team at rounds 1–2 and 4–5, and as Audi Sport Team Saintéloc at round 3. Car No. 26 entered as Saintéloc Junior Team at all rounds.); (France) / Saintéloc Junior Team	Audi R8 LMS Evo II	25	(France) Simon Gachet	P	All
(France) / Audi Sport Team Saintéloc; (France) / Saintéloc Junior Team	Audi R8 LMS Evo II	25	(Germany) Christopher Mies	P	All
(France) / Audi Sport Team Saintéloc; (France) / Saintéloc Junior Team	Audi R8 LMS Evo II	25	(Switzerland) Patric Niederhauser	P	All
(France) / Audi Sport Team Saintéloc; (France) / Saintéloc Junior Team	Audi R8 LMS Evo II	26	(France) Erwan Bastard	S	All
(France) / Audi Sport Team Saintéloc; (France) / Saintéloc Junior Team	Audi R8 LMS Evo II	26	(France) Grégoire Demoustier	S	All
(France) / Audi Sport Team Saintéloc; (France) / Saintéloc Junior Team	Audi R8 LMS Evo II	26	(France) Paul Evrard	S	All
(France) / Audi Sport Team Saintéloc; (France) / Saintéloc Junior Team	Audi R8 LMS Evo II	26	(France) Antoine Doquin	S	3
(Belgium) Team WRT	BMW M4 GT3	30	(Germany) Niklas Krütten	G	All
(Belgium) Team WRT	BMW M4 GT3	30	(France) Jean-Baptiste Simmenauer	G	All
(Belgium) Team WRT	BMW M4 GT3	30	(Australia) Calan Williams	G	All
(Belgium) Team WRT	BMW M4 GT3	31	(United Kingdom) Lewis Proctor	B	1–2, 4–5
(Belgium) Team WRT	BMW M4 GT3	31	(United Kingdom) Tim Whale	B	1–2, 5
(Belgium) Team WRT	BMW M4 GT3	31	(United Kingdom) Adam Carroll	B	1–2
(Belgium) Team WRT	BMW M4 GT3	31	(Germany) Jens Klingmann	B	4
(Belgium) Team WRT	BMW M4 GT3	31	(United Kingdom) Darren Leung	B	4
(Belgium) Team WRT	BMW M4 GT3	31	(Finland) Jesse Krohn	B	5
(Belgium) Team WRT	BMW M4 GT3	31	(United Kingdom) Adam Carroll	P (Note: The No. 31 Team WRT car initially entered the 24 Hours of Spa in Bronze Cup, but it was reclassified as Pro during the race after Tim Whale withdrew due to back pain.)	3
(Belgium) Team WRT	BMW M4 GT3	31	(United Kingdom) Lewis Proctor	P	3
(Belgium) Team WRT	BMW M4 GT3	31	(United Kingdom) Tim Whale	P	3
(Belgium) Team WRT	BMW M4 GT3	32	(South Africa) Sheldon van der Linde	P	All
(Belgium) Team WRT	BMW M4 GT3	32	(Belgium) Dries Vanthoor	P	All
(Belgium) Team WRT	BMW M4 GT3	32	(Belgium) Charles Weerts	P	All
(Belgium) Team WRT	BMW M4 GT3	46	(Brazil) Augusto Farfus	P	All
(Belgium) Team WRT	BMW M4 GT3	46	(Belgium) Maxime Martin	P	All
(Belgium) Team WRT	BMW M4 GT3	46	(Italy) Valentino Rossi	P	All
(Spain) Bullitt Racing	Aston Martin Vantage AMR GT3	33	(France) Romain Leroux	S	All
(Spain) Bullitt Racing	Aston Martin Vantage AMR GT3	33	(Germany) Jacob Riegel	S	All
(Spain) Bullitt Racing	Aston Martin Vantage AMR GT3	33	(Canada) Jeff Kingsley	S	1–4
(Spain) Bullitt Racing	Aston Martin Vantage AMR GT3	33	(Netherlands) Ruben del Sarte	S	3
(Spain) Bullitt Racing	Aston Martin Vantage AMR GT3	33	(France) Maxime Robin	S	5
(Germany) Walkenhorst Motorsport	BMW M4 GT3	35	(Norway) Anders Buchardt	B	All
(Germany) Walkenhorst Motorsport	BMW M4 GT3	35	(United Kingdom) James Kell	B	All
(Germany) Walkenhorst Motorsport	BMW M4 GT3	35	(France) Thomas Neubauer	B	1–4
(Germany) Walkenhorst Motorsport	BMW M4 GT3	35	(United Kingdom) Bailey Voisin	B	3
(Germany) Walkenhorst Motorsport	BMW M4 GT3	35	(United Kingdom) Ben Green	B	5
(Germany) ST Racing with Rinaldi	Ferrari 488 GT3 Evo 2020 1–2; Ferrari 296 GT3 3–5	38	(Canada) Samantha Tan	PA	All
(Germany) ST Racing with Rinaldi	Ferrari 488 GT3 Evo 2020 1–2; Ferrari 296 GT3 3–5	38	(Spain) Isaac Tutumlu	PA	All
(Germany) ST Racing with Rinaldi	Ferrari 488 GT3 Evo 2020 1–2; Ferrari 296 GT3 3–5	38	(United States) Jon Miller	PA	1–4
(Germany) ST Racing with Rinaldi	Ferrari 488 GT3 Evo 2020 1–2; Ferrari 296 GT3 3–5	38	(Germany) Leonard Weiss	PA	3
(Germany) ST Racing with Rinaldi	Ferrari 488 GT3 Evo 2020 1–2; Ferrari 296 GT3 3–5	38	(United Kingdom) Lorcan Hanafin	PA	5
(Germany) / Audi Sport Tresor Orange1 (Note: Car No. 40 entered as Tresor Orange1 at rounds 1–2 and 4–5, and as Audi Sport Tresor Orange1 at round 3. Car No. 66 entered as Tresor Attempto Racing at all rounds. Car No. 99 entered as Tresor Attempto Racing at rounds 1–2 and 4–5, and as Tresor Orange1 at round 3.); (Germany) / Tresor Orange1; (Germany) / Tresor Attempto Racing	Audi R8 LMS Evo II	40	(San Marino) Mattia Drudi (Note: Drudi is an Italian driver competing under a Sammarinese licence.)	P	All
(Germany) / Audi Sport Tresor Orange1; (Germany) / Tresor Orange1; (Germany) / Tresor Attempto Racing	Audi R8 LMS Evo II	40	(Switzerland) Ricardo Feller	P	All
(Germany) / Audi Sport Tresor Orange1; (Germany) / Tresor Orange1; (Germany) / Tresor Attempto Racing	Audi R8 LMS Evo II	40	(Germany) Dennis Marschall	P	All
(Germany) / Audi Sport Tresor Orange1; (Germany) / Tresor Orange1; (Germany) / Tresor Attempto Racing	Audi R8 LMS Evo II	66	Andrey Mukovoz (Note: Boguslavskiy, Mukovoz and Nesov are Russian, but they compete as neutral competitors as Russian national emblems were banned by the FIA following the Russian invasion of Ukraine. Shwartzman and Petrov, also Russians, compete under an Israeli licence for the same reason.)	B	All
(Germany) / Audi Sport Tresor Orange1; (Germany) / Tresor Orange1; (Germany) / Tresor Attempto Racing	Audi R8 LMS Evo II	66	(Luxembourg) Dylan Pereira	B	All
(Germany) / Audi Sport Tresor Orange1; (Germany) / Tresor Orange1; (Germany) / Tresor Attempto Racing	Audi R8 LMS Evo II	66	(Italy) Kikko Galbiati	B	1–4
(Germany) / Audi Sport Tresor Orange1; (Germany) / Tresor Orange1; (Germany) / Tresor Attempto Racing	Audi R8 LMS Evo II	66	(Singapore) Sean Hudspeth	B	3
(Germany) / Audi Sport Tresor Orange1; (Germany) / Tresor Orange1; (Germany) / Tresor Attempto Racing	Audi R8 LMS Evo II	66	(Austria) Christopher Zöchling	B	5
(Germany) / Audi Sport Tresor Orange1; (Germany) / Tresor Orange1; (Germany) / Tresor Attempto Racing	Audi R8 LMS Evo II	99	(Germany) Alex Aka	S	All
(Germany) / Audi Sport Tresor Orange1; (Germany) / Tresor Orange1; (Germany) / Tresor Attempto Racing	Audi R8 LMS Evo II	99	(Italy) Pietro Delli Guanti	S	All
(Germany) / Audi Sport Tresor Orange1; (Germany) / Tresor Orange1; (Germany) / Tresor Attempto Racing	Audi R8 LMS Evo II	99	(Italy) Lorenzo Patrese	S	All
(Italy) / AF Corse (Note: Cars No. 50, No. 52 and No. 53 entered as AF Corse. Cars No. 51 and No. 71 entered as AF Corse - Francorchamps Motors.); (Italy) / AF Corse - Francorchamps Motors	Ferrari 296 GT3	50	(United Kingdom) Simon Mann	B	3
(Italy) / AF Corse; (Italy) / AF Corse - Francorchamps Motors	Ferrari 296 GT3	50	(Belgium) Ulysse de Pauw	B	3
(Italy) / AF Corse; (Italy) / AF Corse - Francorchamps Motors	Ferrari 296 GT3	50	(France) Julien Piguet	B	3
(Italy) / AF Corse; (Italy) / AF Corse - Francorchamps Motors	Ferrari 296 GT3	50	(Argentina) Nicolás Varrone	B	3
(Italy) / AF Corse; (Italy) / AF Corse - Francorchamps Motors	Ferrari 296 GT3	51	(Denmark) Nicklas Nielsen	P	All
(Italy) / AF Corse; (Italy) / AF Corse - Francorchamps Motors	Ferrari 296 GT3	51	(Italy) Alessio Rovera	P	All
(Italy) / AF Corse; (Italy) / AF Corse - Francorchamps Motors	Ferrari 296 GT3	51	(Israel) Robert Shwartzman	P	All
(Italy) / AF Corse; (Italy) / AF Corse - Francorchamps Motors	Ferrari 296 GT3	53	(United States) Manny Franco	S	5
(Italy) / AF Corse; (Italy) / AF Corse - Francorchamps Motors	Ferrari 296 GT3	53	(Monaco) Cédric Sbirrazzuoli	S	5
(Italy) / AF Corse; (Italy) / AF Corse - Francorchamps Motors	Ferrari 296 GT3	53	(France) Lilou Wadoux	S	5
(Italy) / AF Corse; (Italy) / AF Corse - Francorchamps Motors	Ferrari 296 GT3	71	(Italy) Antonio Fuoco	P	All
(Italy) / AF Corse; (Italy) / AF Corse - Francorchamps Motors	Ferrari 296 GT3	71	(Italy) Davide Rigon	P	All
(Italy) / AF Corse; (Italy) / AF Corse - Francorchamps Motors	Ferrari 296 GT3	71	(Italy) Alessandro Pier Guidi	P	1
(Italy) / AF Corse; (Italy) / AF Corse - Francorchamps Motors	Ferrari 296 GT3	71	(Brazil) Daniel Serra	P	2–5
(Italy) / AF Corse; (Italy) / AF Corse - Francorchamps Motors	Ferrari 488 GT3 Evo 2020 1–3; Ferrari 296 GT3 4–5	52	(Italy) Andrea Bertolini	B	All
(Italy) / AF Corse; (Italy) / AF Corse - Francorchamps Motors	Ferrari 488 GT3 Evo 2020 1–3; Ferrari 296 GT3 4–5	52	(Belgium) Jef Machiels	B	All
(Italy) / AF Corse; (Italy) / AF Corse - Francorchamps Motors	Ferrari 488 GT3 Evo 2020 1–3; Ferrari 296 GT3 4–5	52	(Belgium) Louis Machiels	B	All
(Italy) / AF Corse; (Italy) / AF Corse - Francorchamps Motors	Ferrari 488 GT3 Evo 2020 1–3; Ferrari 296 GT3 4–5	52	(France) Lilou Wadoux	B	3
(Italy) / Dinamic GT Huber Racing (Note: Cars No. 54 and No. 55 entered as Dinamic GT Huber Racing at rounds 1–3, and as Dinamic GT at rounds 4–5. Car No. 56 entered as Dinamic GT Huber Racing at rounds 1–3, and as Dinamic GT with Car Collection at rounds 4–5.); (Italy) / Dinamic GT; (Italy) / Dinamic GT with Car Collection	Porsche 911 GT3 R (992)	54	(Germany) Christian Engelhart	P	All
(Italy) / Dinamic GT Huber Racing; (Italy) / Dinamic GT; (Italy) / Dinamic GT with Car Collection	Porsche 911 GT3 R (992)	54	(Turkey) Ayhancan Güven	P	All
(Italy) / Dinamic GT Huber Racing; (Italy) / Dinamic GT; (Italy) / Dinamic GT with Car Collection	Porsche 911 GT3 R (992)	54	(Germany) Sven Müller	P	All
(Italy) / Dinamic GT Huber Racing; (Italy) / Dinamic GT; (Italy) / Dinamic GT with Car Collection	Porsche 911 GT3 R (992)	55	(United Kingdom) Ben Barker	B	All
(Italy) / Dinamic GT Huber Racing; (Italy) / Dinamic GT; (Italy) / Dinamic GT with Car Collection	Porsche 911 GT3 R (992)	55	(Norway) Marius Nakken	B	All
(Italy) / Dinamic GT Huber Racing; (Italy) / Dinamic GT; (Italy) / Dinamic GT with Car Collection	Porsche 911 GT3 R (992)	55	(Austria) Philipp Sager	B	All
(Italy) / Dinamic GT Huber Racing; (Italy) / Dinamic GT; (Italy) / Dinamic GT with Car Collection	Porsche 911 GT3 R (992)	55	(Austria) Christopher Zöchling	B	3
(Italy) / Dinamic GT Huber Racing; (Italy) / Dinamic GT; (Italy) / Dinamic GT with Car Collection	Porsche 911 GT3 R (992) 1, 3–5; Porsche 911 GT3 R (991) 2	56	(Italy) Daniele Di Amato	S	All
(Italy) / Dinamic GT Huber Racing; (Italy) / Dinamic GT; (Italy) / Dinamic GT with Car Collection	Porsche 911 GT3 R (992) 1, 3–5; Porsche 911 GT3 R (991) 2	56	(Netherlands) Jop Rappange	S	All
(Italy) / Dinamic GT Huber Racing; (Italy) / Dinamic GT; (Italy) / Dinamic GT with Car Collection	Porsche 911 GT3 R (992) 1, 3–5; Porsche 911 GT3 R (991) 2	56	(Thailand) Tanart Sathienthirakul	S	All
(Italy) / Dinamic GT Huber Racing; (Italy) / Dinamic GT; (Italy) / Dinamic GT with Car Collection	Porsche 911 GT3 R (992) 1, 3–5; Porsche 911 GT3 R (991) 2	56	(Belgium) Adrien de Leener	S	3
(United States) Winward Racing	Mercedes-AMG GT3 Evo	57	(Netherlands) Indy Dontje	G	All
(United States) Winward Racing	Mercedes-AMG GT3 Evo	57	(Switzerland) Philip Ellis	G	All
(United States) Winward Racing	Mercedes-AMG GT3 Evo	57	(United States) Russell Ward	G	All
(United States) Winward Racing	Mercedes-AMG GT3 Evo	157	(Switzerland) Miklas Born	G	All
(United States) Winward Racing	Mercedes-AMG GT3 Evo	157	(Germany) David Schumacher	G	All
(United States) Winward Racing	Mercedes-AMG GT3 Evo	157	(Germany) Marius Zug	G	All
(Austria) GRT Grasser Racing Team	Lamborghini Huracán GT3 Evo 2	58	(Italy) Fabrizio Crestani	S	All
(Austria) GRT Grasser Racing Team	Lamborghini Huracán GT3 Evo 2	58	(United Kingdom) Sam Neary	S	All
(Austria) GRT Grasser Racing Team	Lamborghini Huracán GT3 Evo 2	58	(Australia) Ricky Capo	S	1–3
(Austria) GRT Grasser Racing Team	Lamborghini Huracán GT3 Evo 2	58	(Austria) Gerhard Tweraser	S	3–5
(Austria) GRT Grasser Racing Team	Lamborghini Huracán GT3 Evo 2	85	(Chile) Benjamín Hites	S	All
(Austria) GRT Grasser Racing Team	Lamborghini Huracán GT3 Evo 2	85	(Austria) Clemens Schmid	S	All
(Austria) GRT Grasser Racing Team	Lamborghini Huracán GT3 Evo 2	85	(Netherlands) Kay van Berlo	S	1
(Austria) GRT Grasser Racing Team	Lamborghini Huracán GT3 Evo 2	85	(Netherlands) Glenn van Berlo	S	2–5
(Italy) VSR	Lamborghini Huracán GT3 Evo 2	60	(Mexico) Luis Michael Dörrbecker	S	3
(Italy) VSR	Lamborghini Huracán GT3 Evo 2	60	(Belgium) Baptiste Moulin	S	3
(Italy) VSR	Lamborghini Huracán GT3 Evo 2	60	(Norway) Marcus Påverud	S	3
(Italy) VSR	Lamborghini Huracán GT3 Evo 2	60	(Israel) Artem Petrov	S	3
(United Kingdom) Team Parker Racing	Porsche 911 GT3 R (992)	62	(United Kingdom) Kiern Jewiss	B	1–4
(United Kingdom) Team Parker Racing	Porsche 911 GT3 R (992)	62	(United Kingdom) Derek Pierce	B	1–4
(United Kingdom) Team Parker Racing	Porsche 911 GT3 R (992)	62	(New Zealand) Jaxon Evans	B	1
(United Kingdom) Team Parker Racing	Porsche 911 GT3 R (992)	62	(United Kingdom) Andy Meyrick	B	2–4
(United Kingdom) Team Parker Racing	Porsche 911 GT3 R (992)	62	(Netherlands) Xavier Maassen	B	3
(Germany) Haupt Racing Team	Mercedes-AMG GT3 Evo	64	(United Kingdom) Matt Bell	PA	3
(Germany) Haupt Racing Team	Mercedes-AMG GT3 Evo	64	(United Kingdom) Frank Bird	PA	3
(Germany) Haupt Racing Team	Mercedes-AMG GT3 Evo	64	(United Kingdom) James Cottingham	PA	3
(Germany) Haupt Racing Team	Mercedes-AMG GT3 Evo	64	(United States) Naveen Rao	PA	3
(Germany) Haupt Racing Team	Mercedes-AMG GT3 Evo	79	(France) Sébastien Baud	B	All
(Germany) Haupt Racing Team	Mercedes-AMG GT3 Evo	79	(Germany) Hubert Haupt	B	All
(Germany) Haupt Racing Team	Mercedes-AMG GT3 Evo	79	(India) Arjun Maini	B	All
(Germany) Haupt Racing Team	Mercedes-AMG GT3 Evo	79	(Australia) Jordan Love	B	3
(United States) SunEnergy1 Racing	Mercedes-AMG GT3 Evo	75	(Netherlands) Nicky Catsburg	PA	3 (Note: Kenny Habul withdrew from the 24 Hours of Spa following an accident in Thursday's pre-qualifying session. Liam Talbot was originally nominated as his replacement, but could not make it to Belgium in time. The seat was eventually taken by GetSpeed owner Adam Osieka.)
(United States) SunEnergy1 Racing	Mercedes-AMG GT3 Evo	75	(Australia) Kenny Habul	PA	3
(United States) SunEnergy1 Racing	Mercedes-AMG GT3 Evo	75	(Austria) Martin Konrad	PA	3
(United States) SunEnergy1 Racing	Mercedes-AMG GT3 Evo	75	(Australia) Chaz Mostert	PA	3
(United States) SunEnergy1 Racing	Mercedes-AMG GT3 Evo	75	(Germany) Adam Osieka	PA	3
(Germany) / Leipert Motorsport (Note: Car No. 70 entered as Leipert Motorsport at round 2, and as CrowdStrike Racing by Leipert Motorsport at round 3.); (Germany) / CrowdStrike Racing by Leipert Motorsport	Lamborghini Huracán GT3 Evo 2 Lamborghini Huracán GT3 Evo 2 3	70	(United States) Jean-Francois Brunot	S	2
(Germany) / Leipert Motorsport; (Germany) / CrowdStrike Racing by Leipert Motorsport	Lamborghini Huracán GT3 Evo 2 Lamborghini Huracán GT3 Evo 2 3	70	(New Zealand) Brendon Leitch	S	2
(Germany) / Leipert Motorsport; (Germany) / CrowdStrike Racing by Leipert Motorsport	Lamborghini Huracán GT3 Evo 2 Lamborghini Huracán GT3 Evo 2 3	70	(China) Kerong Li	S	2
(Germany) / Leipert Motorsport; (Germany) / CrowdStrike Racing by Leipert Motorsport	Lamborghini Huracán GT3 Evo 2 Lamborghini Huracán GT3 Evo 2 3	70	(United States) Jean-Francois Brunot	PA	3
(Germany) / Leipert Motorsport; (Germany) / CrowdStrike Racing by Leipert Motorsport	Lamborghini Huracán GT3 Evo 2 Lamborghini Huracán GT3 Evo 2 3	70	(New Zealand) Brendon Leitch	PA	3
(Germany) / Leipert Motorsport; (Germany) / CrowdStrike Racing by Leipert Motorsport	Lamborghini Huracán GT3 Evo 2 Lamborghini Huracán GT3 Evo 2 3	70	(China) Kerong Li	PA	3
(Germany) / Leipert Motorsport; (Germany) / CrowdStrike Racing by Leipert Motorsport	Lamborghini Huracán GT3 Evo 2 Lamborghini Huracán GT3 Evo 2 3	70	(United States) Gerhard Watzinger	PA	3
(United Kingdom) Barwell Motorsport	Lamborghini Huracán GT3 Evo 2	78	(United Kingdom) Rob Collard	PA	All
(United Kingdom) Barwell Motorsport	Lamborghini Huracán GT3 Evo 2	78	(Denmark) Dennis Lind	PA	All
(United Kingdom) Barwell Motorsport	Lamborghini Huracán GT3 Evo 2	78	(United Kingdom) Adam Balon	PA	1–2, 5
(United Kingdom) Barwell Motorsport	Lamborghini Huracán GT3 Evo 2	78	(Finland) Patrick Kujala	PA	3
(United Kingdom) Barwell Motorsport	Lamborghini Huracán GT3 Evo 2	78	(United Arab Emirates) Bashar Mardini	PA	3
(Saudi Arabia) Theeba Motorsport	Mercedes-AMG GT3 Evo	81	(Estonia) Ralf Aron	B	All
(Saudi Arabia) Theeba Motorsport	Mercedes-AMG GT3 Evo	81	(Saudi Arabia) Reema Juffali	B	All
(Saudi Arabia) Theeba Motorsport	Mercedes-AMG GT3 Evo	81	(Switzerland) Alain Valente	B	All
(Saudi Arabia) Theeba Motorsport	Mercedes-AMG GT3 Evo	81	(Switzerland) Yannick Mettler	B	3
(France) / Mercedes-AMG Team AKKodis ASP (Note: Car No. 87 entered as Mercedes-AMG Team AKKodis ASP. Cars No. 88 and No. 89 entered as AKKodis ASP Team.); (France) / AKKodis ASP Team	Mercedes-AMG GT3 Evo	87	(France) Thomas Drouet	P	All
(France) / Mercedes-AMG Team AKKodis ASP; (France) / AKKodis ASP Team	Mercedes-AMG GT3 Evo	87	(Italy) Lorenzo Ferrari	P	All
(France) / Mercedes-AMG Team AKKodis ASP; (France) / AKKodis ASP Team	Mercedes-AMG GT3 Evo	87	(Germany) Maximilian Götz	P	All
(France) / Mercedes-AMG Team AKKodis ASP; (France) / AKKodis ASP Team	Mercedes-AMG GT3 Evo	88	Timur Boguslavskiy	P	All
(France) / Mercedes-AMG Team AKKodis ASP; (France) / AKKodis ASP Team	Mercedes-AMG GT3 Evo	88	(Andorra) Jules Gounon	P	All
(France) / Mercedes-AMG Team AKKodis ASP; (France) / AKKodis ASP Team	Mercedes-AMG GT3 Evo	88	(Switzerland) Raffaele Marciello	P	All
(France) / Mercedes-AMG Team AKKodis ASP; (France) / AKKodis ASP Team	Mercedes-AMG GT3 Evo	89	(Brazil) Adalberto Baptista	B	2–3, 5
(France) / Mercedes-AMG Team AKKodis ASP; (France) / AKKodis ASP Team	Mercedes-AMG GT3 Evo	89	(Brazil) Bruno Baptista	B	2–3, 5
(France) / Mercedes-AMG Team AKKodis ASP; (France) / AKKodis ASP Team	Mercedes-AMG GT3 Evo	89	(Brazil) Rodrigo Baptista	B	2–3, 5
(France) / Mercedes-AMG Team AKKodis ASP; (France) / AKKodis ASP Team	Mercedes-AMG GT3 Evo	89	(Brazil) Alan Hellmeister	B	3
(Spain) Madpanda Motorsport	Mercedes-AMG GT3 Evo	90	(Norway) Magnus Gustavsen	S	All
(Spain) Madpanda Motorsport	Mercedes-AMG GT3 Evo	90	Alexey Nesov	S	All
(Spain) Madpanda Motorsport	Mercedes-AMG GT3 Evo	90	(Argentina) Ezequiel Pérez Companc	S	All
(Spain) Madpanda Motorsport	Mercedes-AMG GT3 Evo	90	(Finland) Jesse Salmenautio	S	3
(Germany) Herberth Motorsport (Note: Car No. 91 entered as Herberth Motorsport. Car No. 911 entered as Pure Rxcing.) (Lithuania) Pure Rxcing	Porsche 911 GT3 R (991) 1 Porsche 911 GT3 R (992) 2–5	91	(Germany) Ralf Bohn	B	All
(Germany) Herberth Motorsport (Lithuania) Pure Rxcing	Porsche 911 GT3 R (991) 1 Porsche 911 GT3 R (992) 2–5	91	(Germany) Robert Renauer	B	All
(Germany) Herberth Motorsport (Lithuania) Pure Rxcing	Porsche 911 GT3 R (991) 1 Porsche 911 GT3 R (992) 2–5	91	(Germany) Alfred Renauer	B	1–3, 5
(Germany) Herberth Motorsport (Lithuania) Pure Rxcing	Porsche 911 GT3 R (991) 1 Porsche 911 GT3 R (992) 2–5	91	(Netherlands) Kay van Berlo	B	3
(Germany) Herberth Motorsport (Lithuania) Pure Rxcing	Porsche 911 GT3 R (991) 1 Porsche 911 GT3 R (992) 2–5	91	(Germany) Tim Heinemann	B	4
(Germany) Herberth Motorsport (Lithuania) Pure Rxcing	Porsche 911 GT3 R (992)	911	(Austria) Klaus Bachler	B	All
(Germany) Herberth Motorsport (Lithuania) Pure Rxcing	Porsche 911 GT3 R (992)	911	(United Kingdom) Alex Malykhin (Note: Malykhin is Belarusian, but he competes under a British licence as Belarusian national emblems were banned by the FIA following the Russian invasion of Ukraine.)	B	All
(Germany) Herberth Motorsport (Lithuania) Pure Rxcing	Porsche 911 GT3 R (992)	911	(Germany) Joel Sturm	B	All
(Germany) Herberth Motorsport (Lithuania) Pure Rxcing	Porsche 911 GT3 R (992)	911	(Germany) Marco Seefried	B	3
(Germany) Manthey EMA	Porsche 911 GT3 R (992)	92	(France) Julien Andlauer	P	3
(Germany) Manthey EMA	Porsche 911 GT3 R (992)	92	(France) Kévin Estre	P	3
(Germany) Manthey EMA	Porsche 911 GT3 R (992)	92	(Belgium) Laurens Vanthoor	P	3
(United Kingdom) Sky – Tempesta Racing	McLaren 720S GT3 Evo	93	(Italy) Eddie Cheever III	B	All
(United Kingdom) Sky – Tempesta Racing	McLaren 720S GT3 Evo	93	(United Kingdom) Chris Froggatt	B	All
(United Kingdom) Sky – Tempesta Racing	McLaren 720S GT3 Evo	93	(Hong Kong) Jonathan Hui	B	All
(United Kingdom) Sky – Tempesta Racing	McLaren 720S GT3 Evo	93	(Switzerland) Jeffrey Schmidt	B	3
(United Kingdom) Garage 59	McLaren 720S GT3 Evo	159	(Germany) Benjamin Goethe	P	All
(United Kingdom) Garage 59	McLaren 720S GT3 Evo	159	(Germany) Marvin Kirchhöfer	P	All
(United Kingdom) Garage 59	McLaren 720S GT3 Evo	159	(Denmark) Nicolai Kjærgaard	P	All
(United Kingdom) Garage 59	McLaren 720S GT3 Evo	188	(Portugal) Henrique Chaves	B	All
(United Kingdom) Garage 59	McLaren 720S GT3 Evo	188	(Monaco) Louis Prette	B	All
(United Kingdom) Garage 59	McLaren 720S GT3 Evo	188	(Portugal) Miguel Ramos	B	All
(United Kingdom) Garage 59	McLaren 720S GT3 Evo	188	(United States) Conrad Grunewald	B	3
(Germany) Rutronik Racing	Porsche 911 GT3 R (992)	96	(Germany) Laurin Heinrich	P	All
(Germany) Rutronik Racing	Porsche 911 GT3 R (992)	96	(Norway) Dennis Olsen	P	All
(Germany) Rutronik Racing	Porsche 911 GT3 R (992)	96	(Austria) Thomas Preining	P	All
(Germany) ROWE Racing	BMW M4 GT3	98	(Austria) Philipp Eng	P	All
(Germany) ROWE Racing	BMW M4 GT3	98	(Germany) Marco Wittmann	P	All
(Germany) ROWE Racing	BMW M4 GT3	98	(United Kingdom) Nick Yelloly	P	All
(Germany) ROWE Racing	BMW M4 GT3	998	(United Kingdom) Daniel Harper	P	All
(Germany) ROWE Racing	BMW M4 GT3	998	(Germany) Max Hesse	P	All
(Germany) ROWE Racing	BMW M4 GT3	998	(United States) Neil Verhagen	P	All
(Hong Kong) Modena Motorsports	Porsche 911 GT3 R (992)	216	(Switzerland) Mathias Beche	PA	3
(Hong Kong) Modena Motorsports	Porsche 911 GT3 R (992)	216	(Canada) John Shen	PA	3
(Hong Kong) Modena Motorsports	Porsche 911 GT3 R (992)	216	(Denmark) Benny Simonsen	PA	3
(Hong Kong) Modena Motorsports	Porsche 911 GT3 R (992)	216	(Netherlands) Francis Tjia	PA	3
(France) CSA Racing	Audi R8 LMS Evo II	888	(France) Arthur Rougier	B	1–2, 5
(France) CSA Racing	Audi R8 LMS Evo II	888	(France) Erwin Creed	B	1–2
(France) CSA Racing	Audi R8 LMS Evo II	888	(Poland) Igor Waliłko	B	1
(France) CSA Racing	Audi R8 LMS Evo II	888	(Switzerland) Lucas Légeret	B	2
(France) CSA Racing	Audi R8 LMS Evo II	888	(France) Alexandre Cougnaud	B	5
(France) CSA Racing	Audi R8 LMS Evo II	888	(France) Arnold Robin	B	5
(France) CSA Racing	Audi R8 LMS Evo II	888	(France) Erwin Creed	PA	3–4
(France) CSA Racing	Audi R8 LMS Evo II	888	(France) Arthur Rougier	PA	3–4
(France) CSA Racing	Audi R8 LMS Evo II	888	(Belgium) Jean Glorieux	PA	3
(France) CSA Racing	Audi R8 LMS Evo II	888	(United Kingdom) Casper Stevenson	PA	3
(Hong Kong) Mercedes-AMG Team GruppeM Racing	Mercedes-AMG GT3 Evo	999	(Germany) Maro Engel	P	3
(Hong Kong) Mercedes-AMG Team GruppeM Racing	Mercedes-AMG GT3 Evo	999	(Canada) Mikaël Grenier	P	3
(Hong Kong) Mercedes-AMG Team GruppeM Racing	Mercedes-AMG GT3 Evo	999	(Spain) Daniel Juncadella	P	3

Icon	Class
P	Pro Cup
G	Gold Cup
S	Silver Cup
B	Bronze Cup
PA	Pro-Am Cup

- Zdeněk Chovanec was scheduled to compete for GetSpeed, but withdrew prior to the start of the season.

=== Sprint Cup ===
Team	Car	No.	Drivers	Class	Rounds
(Belgium) Boutsen VDS	Audi R8 LMS Evo II	9	(Italy) Alberto Di Folco	G	All
(Belgium) Boutsen VDS	Audi R8 LMS Evo II	9	(France) Aurélien Panis	G	All
(Belgium) Boutsen VDS	Audi R8 LMS Evo II	10	(France) Adam Eteki	G	All
(Belgium) Boutsen VDS	Audi R8 LMS Evo II	10	(France) César Gazeau	G	All
(Belgium) Comtoyou Racing	Audi R8 LMS Evo II	11	(Germany) Christopher Haase	P	All
(Belgium) Comtoyou Racing	Audi R8 LMS Evo II	11	(Switzerland) Lucas Légeret	P	All
(Belgium) Comtoyou Racing	Audi R8 LMS Evo II	12	(Belgium) Nicolas Baert	P	All
(Belgium) Comtoyou Racing	Audi R8 LMS Evo II	12	(Belgium) Frédéric Vervisch	P	All
(Belgium) Comtoyou Racing	Audi R8 LMS Evo II	21	(United Kingdom) Finlay Hutchison	G	All
(Belgium) Comtoyou Racing	Audi R8 LMS Evo II	21	(Belgium) Gilles Magnus	G	All
(Switzerland) Emil Frey Racing	Ferrari 296 GT3	14	(Italy) Giacomo Altoè	P	All
(Switzerland) Emil Frey Racing	Ferrari 296 GT3	14	(Finland) Konsta Lappalainen	P	All
(Switzerland) Emil Frey Racing	Ferrari 296 GT3	69	(Spain) Albert Costa	P	All
(Switzerland) Emil Frey Racing	Ferrari 296 GT3	69	(Netherlands) Thierry Vermeulen	P	All
(Monaco) GSM AB1 GT3 Team	Lamborghini Huracán GT3 Evo	18	(Italy) Nicholas Risitano	S	1–2
(Monaco) GSM AB1 GT3 Team	Lamborghini Huracán GT3 Evo	18	(Brazil) Fernando Croce	S	1
(Monaco) GSM AB1 GT3 Team	Lamborghini Huracán GT3 Evo	18	(Spain) Fidel Castillo	S	2
(Monaco) GSM AB1 GT3 Team	Lamborghini Huracán GT3 Evo	18	(Italy) Matteo Desideri	S	3
(Monaco) GSM AB1 GT3 Team	Lamborghini Huracán GT3 Evo	18	(Italy) Federico Scionti	S	3
(Monaco) GSM AB1 GT3 Team	Lamborghini Huracán GT3 Evo	18	(United Kingdom) James Kell	S	4
(Monaco) GSM AB1 GT3 Team	Lamborghini Huracán GT3 Evo	18	(South Africa) Jarrod Waberski	S	4
(Monaco) GSM AB1 GT3 Team	Lamborghini Huracán GT3 Evo	18	(United Kingdom) Harley Haughton	S	5
(Monaco) GSM AB1 GT3 Team	Lamborghini Huracán GT3 Evo	18	(Netherlands) Paul Meijer	S	5
(France) Saintéloc Junior Team	Audi R8 LMS Evo II	25	(France) Erwan Bastard	P	All
(France) Saintéloc Junior Team	Audi R8 LMS Evo II	25	(Switzerland) Patric Niederhauser	P	All
(France) Saintéloc Junior Team	Audi R8 LMS Evo II	26	(France) Paul Evrard	G	All
(France) Saintéloc Junior Team	Audi R8 LMS Evo II	26	(France) Simon Gachet	G	All
(France) Saintéloc Junior Team	Audi R8 LMS Evo II	27	(France) Grégoire Demoustier	P	All
(France) Saintéloc Junior Team	Audi R8 LMS Evo II	27	(Germany) Christopher Mies	P	All
(Italy) Nova Race	Honda NSX GT3 Evo22	28	(Italy) Jacopo Guidetti	S	All
(Italy) Nova Race	Honda NSX GT3 Evo22	28	(Italy) Leonardo Moncini	S	All
(Italy) Nova Race	Honda NSX GT3 Evo22	68	(Italy) Erwin Zanotti	S	All
(Italy) Nova Race	Honda NSX GT3 Evo22	68	(Italy) Diego Di Fabio	S	1–3
(Italy) Nova Race	Honda NSX GT3 Evo22	68	(Italy) Alex Frassinetti	S	4–5
(Belgium) Team WRT	BMW M4 GT3	30	(Germany) Niklas Krütten	G	All
(Belgium) Team WRT	BMW M4 GT3	30	(Australia) Calan Williams	G	All
(Belgium) Team WRT	BMW M4 GT3	31	(France) Thomas Neubauer	P	All
(Belgium) Team WRT	BMW M4 GT3	31	(France) Jean-Baptiste Simmenauer	P	All
(Belgium) Team WRT	BMW M4 GT3	32	(Belgium) Dries Vanthoor	P	All
(Belgium) Team WRT	BMW M4 GT3	32	(Belgium) Charles Weerts	P	All
(Belgium) Team WRT	BMW M4 GT3	46	(Belgium) Maxime Martin	P	All
(Belgium) Team WRT	BMW M4 GT3	46	(Italy) Valentino Rossi	P	All
(Germany) Tresor Orange1	Audi R8 LMS Evo II	40	(San Marino) Mattia Drudi	P	All
(Germany) Tresor Orange1	Audi R8 LMS Evo II	40	(Switzerland) Ricardo Feller	P	All
(Germany) Tresor Attempto Racing	Audi R8 LMS Evo II	66	(Germany) Dennis Marschall	B	2–4
(Germany) Tresor Attempto Racing	Audi R8 LMS Evo II	66	Andrey Mukovoz	B	2–4
(Germany) Tresor Attempto Racing	Audi R8 LMS Evo II	99	(Germany) Alex Aka	S	All
(Germany) Tresor Attempto Racing	Audi R8 LMS Evo II	99	(Italy) Lorenzo Patrese	S	All
(Germany) Tresor Attempto Racing	Audi R8 LMS Evo II	333	(Italy) Alessio Deledda	S	2
(Germany) Tresor Attempto Racing	Audi R8 LMS Evo II	333	(Italy) Pietro Delli Guanti	S	2
(France) CLRT	Porsche 911 GT3 R (992)	44	(France) Steven Palette	B	2–4
(France) CLRT	Porsche 911 GT3 R (992)	44	(Italy) Marco Cassarà	B	2
(France) CLRT	Porsche 911 GT3 R (992)	44	(France) Stéphane Denoual	B	3–4
(France) CLRT	Porsche 911 GT3 R (992)	44	(Turkey) Ayhancan Güven	P	5
(France) CLRT	Porsche 911 GT3 R (992)	44	(Germany) Laurin Heinrich	P	5
(Italy) AF Corse	Ferrari 296 GT3	52	(Belgium) Louis Machiels	B	2–4
(Italy) AF Corse	Ferrari 296 GT3	52	(Italy) Andrea Bertolini	B	2–3
(Italy) AF Corse	Ferrari 296 GT3	52	(Belgium) Jef Machiels	B	4
(Italy) AF Corse	Ferrari 488 GT3 Evo 2020 1 Ferrari 296 GT3 2–4	71	(Singapore) Sean Hudspeth	S	All
(Italy) AF Corse	Ferrari 488 GT3 Evo 2020 1 Ferrari 296 GT3 2–4	71	(Italy) Nicola Marinangeli	S	All
(Italy) Dinamic GT Huber Racing	Porsche 911 GT3 R (992)	54	(Belgium) Adrien de Leener	P	All
(Italy) Dinamic GT Huber Racing	Porsche 911 GT3 R (992)	54	(Germany) Christian Engelhart	P	All
(Italy) Dinamic GT Huber Racing	Porsche 911 GT3 R (992)	55	(Austria) Philipp Sager	B	2–4
(Italy) Dinamic GT Huber Racing	Porsche 911 GT3 R (992)	55	(Austria) Christopher Zöchling	B	2–4
(Italy) VSR	Lamborghini Huracán GT3 Evo 2	60	(South Africa) Jordan Pepper	P	1–3
(Italy) VSR	Lamborghini Huracán GT3 Evo 2	60	(France) Franck Perera	P	1–3
(Italy) VSR	Lamborghini Huracán GT3 Evo 2	60	(Italy) Andrea Caldarelli	P	4–5
(Italy) VSR	Lamborghini Huracán GT3 Evo 2	60	(Italy) Marco Mapelli	P	4–5
(Italy) VSR	Lamborghini Huracán GT3 Evo 2	119	(Belgium) Baptiste Moulin	S	1–4
(Italy) VSR	Lamborghini Huracán GT3 Evo 2	119	(Norway) Marcus Påverud	S	1–4
(Italy) VSR	Lamborghini Huracán GT3 Evo 2	163	(Japan) Yuki Nemoto	S	1–4
(Italy) VSR	Lamborghini Huracán GT3 Evo 2	163	(Switzerland) Rolf Ineichen	S	1, 3
(Italy) VSR	Lamborghini Huracán GT3 Evo 2	163	(Italy) Mattia Michelotto	S	2
(Italy) VSR	Lamborghini Huracán GT3 Evo 2	163	(Germany) Maximilian Paul	S	4–5
(Italy) VSR	Lamborghini Huracán GT3 Evo 2	163	(Norway) Marcus Påverud	S	5
(Germany) Paul Motorsport	Lamborghini Huracán GT3 Evo	65	(Germany) Maximilian Paul	S	3
(Germany) Paul Motorsport	Lamborghini Huracán GT3 Evo	65	(Germany) Simon Connor Primm	S	3
(Germany) Haupt Racing Team	Mercedes-AMG GT3 Evo	77	(Australia) Jordan Love	S	All
(Germany) Haupt Racing Team	Mercedes-AMG GT3 Evo	77	(United Kingdom) Frank Bird	S	1–2, 5
(Germany) Haupt Racing Team	Mercedes-AMG GT3 Evo	77	(Switzerland) Alain Valente	S	3–4
(Germany) Haupt Racing Team	Mercedes-AMG GT3 Evo	79	(France) Sébastien Baud	B	2–4
(Germany) Haupt Racing Team	Mercedes-AMG GT3 Evo	79	(Germany) Hubert Haupt	B	2–4
(Saudi Arabia) Theeba Motorsport	Mercedes-AMG GT3 Evo	81	(Saudi Arabia) Reema Juffali	B	2–4
(Saudi Arabia) Theeba Motorsport	Mercedes-AMG GT3 Evo	81	(Germany) Fabian Schiller	B	2–4
(France) AKKodis ASP Team	Mercedes-AMG GT3 Evo	87	(France) Eric Debard	B	2–4
(France) AKKodis ASP Team	Mercedes-AMG GT3 Evo	87	(France) Jim Pla	B	2–4
(France) AKKodis ASP Team	Mercedes-AMG GT3 Evo	88	Timur Boguslavskiy	P	All
(France) AKKodis ASP Team	Mercedes-AMG GT3 Evo	88	(Switzerland) Raffaele Marciello	P	All
(Spain) Madpanda Motorsport	Mercedes-AMG GT3 Evo	90	(Argentina) Ezequiel Pérez Companc	S	All
(Spain) Madpanda Motorsport	Mercedes-AMG GT3 Evo	90	(Finland) Jesse Salmenautio	S	All
(Germany) Herberth Motorsport	Porsche 911 GT3 R (992)	91	(Germany) Ralf Bohn	B	2–4
(Germany) Herberth Motorsport	Porsche 911 GT3 R (992)	91	(Germany) Robert Renauer	B	2–4
(Lithuania) Pure Rxcing	Porsche 911 GT3 R (992)	911	(United Kingdom) Alex Malykhin	B	2–4
(Lithuania) Pure Rxcing	Porsche 911 GT3 R (992)	911	(Turkey) Ayhancan Güven	B	2, 4
(Lithuania) Pure Rxcing	Porsche 911 GT3 R (992)	911	(Austria) Klaus Bachler	B	3
(Luxembourg) JP Motorsport	McLaren 720S GT3 Evo	111	(Austria) Christian Klien	P	All
(Luxembourg) JP Motorsport	McLaren 720S GT3 Evo	111	(United Kingdom) Dean MacDonald	P	All
(Luxembourg) JP Motorsport	McLaren 720S GT3 Evo	112	(Poland) Patryk Krupiński	B	2–3
(Luxembourg) JP Motorsport	McLaren 720S GT3 Evo	112	(Austria) Norbert Siedler	B	2–3
(Luxembourg) JP Motorsport	McLaren 720S GT3 Evo	112	(Poland) Patryk Krupiński	G	5
(Luxembourg) JP Motorsport	McLaren 720S GT3 Evo	112	(Austria) Norbert Siedler	G	5
(Italy) Imperiale Racing	Lamborghini Huracán GT3 Evo	126	(Kyrgyzstan) Dmitry Gvazava	B	2
(Italy) Imperiale Racing	Lamborghini Huracán GT3 Evo	126	(Italy) Loris Spinelli	B	2
(United Kingdom) Garage 59	McLaren 720S GT3 Evo	159	(Germany) Benjamin Goethe	P	All
(United Kingdom) Garage 59	McLaren 720S GT3 Evo	159	(Denmark) Nicolai Kjærgaard	P	All
(United Kingdom) Garage 59	McLaren 720S GT3 Evo	188	(Portugal) Henrique Chaves	B	2–4
(United Kingdom) Garage 59	McLaren 720S GT3 Evo	188	(Portugal) Miguel Ramos	B	2–4

Icon	Class
P	Pro Cup
G	Gold Cup
S	Silver Cup
B	Bronze Cup

== Race results ==
Round		Circuit	Pole position	Overall winners	Gold Cup winners	Silver winners	Bronze winners	Pro/Am winners	Report
1		(Italy) Monza	(Germany) #98 ROWE Racing	(Germany) #98 ROWE Racing	(Belgium) #21 Comtoyou Racing	(Belgium) #12 Comtoyou Racing	(Lithuania) #911 Pure Rxcing	(United Kingdom) #78 Barwell Motorsport	report
1		(Italy) Monza	(Austria) Philipp Eng (Germany) Marco Wittmann (Austria) Nick Yelloly	(Austria) Philipp Eng (Germany) Marco Wittmann (Austria) Nick Yelloly	(Belgium) Nicolas Baert (Austria) Max Hofer (Belgium) Maxime Soulet	(Belgium) Sam Dejonghe (Netherlands) Loris Hezemans (United Kingdom) Finlay Hutchison	(Austria) Klaus Bachler (United Kingdom) Alex Malykhin (Germany) Joel Stürm	(United Kingdom) Adam Balon (United Kingdom) Rob Collard (Denmark) Dennis Lind	report
2	R1	(United Kingdom) Brands Hatch	(France) No. 88 AKKodis ASP Team	(France) No. 88 AKKodis ASP Team	(Belgium) No. 9 Boutsen VDS	(Germany) No. 99 Tresor Atttempto Racing	Did not participate		Report
2	R1	(United Kingdom) Brands Hatch	(Switzerland) Raffaele Marciello; Timur Boguslavskiy	(Switzerland) Raffaele Marciello; Timur Boguslavskiy	(Italy) Alberto di Folco (France) Aurélien Panis	(Germany) Alex Aka (Italy) Lorenzo Patrese	Did not participate		Report
2	R2	(United Kingdom) Brands Hatch	(France) No. 27 Saintéloc Junior Team	(Germany) No. 40 Tresor Orange1	(Belgium) No. 30 Team WRT	(Italy) No. 119 VSR	Did not participate		Report
2	R2	(United Kingdom) Brands Hatch	(France) Grégoire Demoustier (Germany) Christopher Mies	(San Marino) Mattia Drudi (Switzerland) Ricardo Feller	(Australia) Calan Williams (Germany) Niklas Krütten	(Belgium) Baptiste Moulin (Norway) Marcus Påverud	Did not participate		Report
3		(France) Paul Ricard	(France) No. 88 AKKodis ASP Team	(France) No. 88 AKKodis ASP Team	(Belgium) #21 Comtoyou Racing	(Germany) #99 Tresor Attempto Racing	(Germany) #79 Haupt Racing Team	(Germany) #24 Car Collection Motorsport	report
3		(France) Paul Ricard	(Switzerland) Raffaele Marciello; Timur Boguslavskiy (Andorra) Jules Gounon	(Switzerland) Raffaele Marciello; Timur Boguslavskiy (Andorra) Jules Gounon	(Belgium) Nicolas Baert (Austria) Max Hofer (Belgium) Maxime Soulet	(Germany) Alex Aka (Italy) Pietro Delli Guanti (Italy) Lorenzo Patrese	(France) Sébastien Baud (Germany) Hubert Haupt (India) Arjun Maini	(Switzerland) Alex Fontana (Switzerland) Ivan Jacoma (Switzerland) Nicolas Leutwiler	report
4		(Belgium) Spa-Francorchamps	(Germany) #20 Huber Motorsport	(Germany) #98 ROWE Racing	(United Kingdom) #5 Optimum Motorsport	(Austria) #85 GRT Grasser Racing Team	(Germany) #20 Huber Motorsport	(Australia) #75 SunEnergy1 Racing	report
4		(Belgium) Spa-Francorchamps	(Hong Kong) Antares Au (Italy) Matteo Cairoli (Germany) Jannes Fittje (Germany) Tim Heinemann	(Austria) Philipp Eng (Germany) Marco Wittmann (United Kingdom) Nick Yelloly	(United Kingdom) Sam De Haan (United Kingdom) Charlie Fagg (United Kingdom) Tom Gamble (United Kingdom) Dean MacDonald	(Chile) Benjamín Hites (Austria) Clemens Schmid (Netherlands) Glenn van Berlo	(Hong Kong) Antares Au (Italy) Matteo Cairoli (Germany) Jannes Fittje (Germany) Tim Heinemann	(Netherlands) Nicky Catsburg (Austria) Martin Konrad (Australia) Chaz Mostert (Germany) Adam Osieka	report
5	R1	(Italy) Misano	(France) No. 88 AKKodis ASP Team	(France) No. 88 AKKodis ASP Team	(Belgium) No. 9 Boutsen VDS	(Germany) No. 77 Haupt Racing Team	(United Kingdom) No. 188 Garage 59	Did not participate	Report
5	R1	(Italy) Misano	(Switzerland) Raffaele Marciello; Timur Boguslavskiy	(Switzerland) Raffaele Marciello; Timur Boguslavskiy	(Italy) Alberto Di Folco (France) Aurélien Panis	(United Kingdom) Frank Bird (Australia) Jordan Love	(Portugal) Henrique Chaves (Portugal) Miguel Ramos	Did not participate	Report
5	R2	(Italy) Misano	(Belgium) No. 32 Team WRT	(Belgium) No. 46 Team WRT	(Belgium) No. 30 Team WRT	(Germany) No. 99 Tresor Attempto Racing	(United Kingdom) No. 188 Garage 59	Did not participate	Report
5	R2	(Italy) Misano	(Belgium) Dries Vanthoor (Belgium) Charles Weerts	(Italy) Valentino Rossi (Belgium) Maxime Martin	(Germany) Niklas Krütten (Australia) Calan Williams	(Germany) Alex Aka (Italy) Lorenzo Patrese	(Portugal) Henrique Chaves (Portugal) Miguel Ramos	Did not participate	Report
6		(Germany) Nürburgring	(France) #88 AKKodis ASP Team	(France) #88 AKKodis ASP Team	(United States) #157 Winward Racing	(Austria) #85 GRT - Grasser Racing Team	(Germany) #91 Herberth Motorsport	(United Kingdom) #78 Barwell Motorsport	report
6		(Germany) Nürburgring	(Switzerland) Raffaele Marciello; Timur Boguslavskiy (Andorra) Jules Gounon	(Switzerland) Raffaele Marciello; Timur Boguslavskiy (Andorra) Jules Gounon	(Switzerland) Miklas Born (Germany) David Schumacher (Germany) Marius Zug	(Chile) Benjamín Hites (Austria) Clemens Schmid (Netherlands) Glenn van Berlo	(Germany) Ralf Bohn (Germany) Tim Heinemann (Germany) Robert Renauer	(United Kingdom) Rob Collard (Denmark) Dennis Lind	report
7	R1	(Germany) Hockenheim	(Italy) No. 60 VSR	(Germany) No. 40 Tresor Orange1	(Belgium) No. 30 Team WRT	(Germany) No. 77 Haupt Racing Team	(Germany) No. 66 Tresor Attempto Racing	Did not participate	Report
7	R1	(Germany) Hockenheim	(South Africa) Jordan Pepper (France) Franck Perera	(San Marino) Mattia Drudi (Switzerland) Ricardo Feller	(Germany) Niklas Krütten (Australia) Calan Williams	(Australia) Jordan Love (Switzerland) Alain Valente	(Germany) Dennis Marschall; Andrey Mukovoz	Did not participate	Report
7	R2	(Germany) Hockenheim	(Germany) No. 40 Tresor Orange1	(France) No. 88 AKKodis ASP Team	(Belgium) No. 9 Boutsen VDS	(Germany) No. 99 Tresor Attempto Racing	(Germany) No. 79 Haupt Racing Team	Did not participate	Report
7	R2	(Germany) Hockenheim	(San Marino) Mattia Drudi (Switzerland) Ricardo Feller	Timur Boguslavskiy (Switzerland) Raffaele Marciello	(Italy) Alberto Di Folco (France) Aurélien Panis	(Germany) Alex Aka (Italy) Lorenzo Patrese	(France) Sébastien Baud (Germany) Hubert Haupt	Did not participate	Report
8	R1	(Spain) Valencia	(Germany) No. 66 Tresor Attempto Racing	(France) No. 88 AKKodis ASP Team	(Belgium) No. 21 Comtoyou Racing	(Germany) No. 99 Tresor Attempto Racing	(Germany) No. 66 Tresor Attempto Racing	Did not participate	Report
8	R1	(Spain) Valencia	(Germany) Dennis Marschall; Andrey Mukovoz	Timur Boguslavskiy (Switzerland) Raffaele Marciello	(United Kingdom) Finlay Hutchison (Belgium) Gilles Magnus	(Germany) Alex Aka (Italy) Lorenzo Patrese	(Germany) Dennis Marschall; Andrey Mukovoz	Did not participate	Report
8	R2	(Spain) Valencia	(France) No. 26 Saintéloc Junior Team	(Belgium) No. 32 Team WRT	(France) No. 26 Saintéloc Junior Team	(Germany) No. 99 Tresor Attempto Racing	(Lithuania) No. 911 Pure Rxcing	Did not participate	Report
8	R2	(Spain) Valencia	(France) Paul Evrard (France) Simon Gachet	(Belgium) Dries Vanthoor (Belgium) Charles Weerts	(France) Paul Evrard (France) Simon Gachet	(Germany) Alex Aka (Italy) Lorenzo Patrese	(United Kingdom) Alex Malykhin (Turkey) Ayhancan Güven	Did not participate	Report
9		(Spain) Barcelona	(Italy) #51 AF Corse - Francorchamps Motors	(Italy) #51 AF Corse - Francorchamps Motors	(Belgium) #9 Boutsen VDS	(Austria) #58 GRT - Grasser Racing Team	(United Kingdom) #188 Garage 59	(Germany) #38 ST Racing with Rinaldi	report
9		(Spain) Barcelona	(Denmark) Nicklas Nielsen (Italy) Alessio Rovera (Israel) Robert Shwartzman	(Denmark) Nicklas Nielsen (Italy) Alessio Rovera (Israel) Robert Shwartzman	(Italy) Alberto Di Folco (France) Adam Eteki (France) Aurélien Panis	(Italy) Fabrizio Crestani (United Kingdom) Sam Neary (Austria) Gerhard Tweraser	(Portugal) Henrique Chaves (Monaco) Louis Prette (Portugal) Miguel Ramos	(United Kingdom) Lorcan Hanafin (Canada) Samantha Tan (Spain) Isaac Tutumlu	report
10	R1	(Netherlands) Zandvoort	(Germany) No. 40 Tresor Orange1	(Germany) No. 40 Tresor Orange1	(Belgium) No. 10 Boutsen VDS	(Germany) No. 77 Haupt Racing Team	Did not participate		Report
10	R1	(Netherlands) Zandvoort	(San Marino) Mattia Drudi (Switzerland) Ricardo Feller	(San Marino) Mattia Drudi (Switzerland) Ricardo Feller	(France) Adam Eteki (France) César Gazeau	(Australia) Jordan Love (United Kingdom) Frank Bird	Did not participate		Report
10	R2	(Netherlands) Zandvoort	(Belgium) No. 46 Team WRT	(Germany) No. 40 Tresor Orange1	(Belgium) No. 30 Team WRT	(Germany) No. 77 Haupt Racing Team	Did not participate		Report
10	R2	(Netherlands) Zandvoort	(Belgium) Maxime Martin (Italy) Valentino Rossi	(San Marino) Mattia Drudi (Switzerland) Ricardo Feller	(Germany) Niklas Krütten (Australia) Calan Williams	(Australia) Jordan Love (United Kingdom) Frank Bird	Did not participate		Report

== Championship standings ==
Scoring system

Championship points are awarded for the first ten positions in each race. The pole-sitter also receives one point and entries are required to complete 75% of the winning car's race distance in order to be classified and earn points. Individual drivers are required to participate for a minimum of 25 minutes in order to earn championship points in any race.

Sprint Cup points

Position	1st	2nd	3rd	4th	5th	6th	7th	8th	9th	10th	Pole
Points	16.5	12	9.5	7.5	6	4.5	3	2	1	0.5	1

Monza, Nürburgring & Barcelona points

Position	1st	2nd	3rd	4th	5th	6th	7th	8th	9th	10th	Pole
Points	25	18	15	12	10	8	6	4	2	1	1

Paul Ricard points

Position	1st	2nd	3rd	4th	5th	6th	7th	8th	9th	10th	Pole
Points	33	24	19	15	12	9	6	4	2	1	1

24 Hours of Spa points

Points are awarded after six hours, after twelve hours and at the finish.

Position	1st	2nd	3rd	4th	5th	6th	7th	8th	9th	10th	Pole
Points after 6hrs/12hrs	12	9	7	6	5	4	3	2	1	0	1
Points at the finish	25	18	15	12	10	8	6	4	2	1	1

=== Drivers' Championship ===
==== Overall ====
Pos.	Drivers	Team	MNZ (Italy)	BRH (United Kingdom)		LEC (France)	SPA (Belgium)			MIS (Italy)		NÜR (Germany)	HOC (Germany)		VAL (Spain)		BAR (Spain)	ZAN (Netherlands)		Points
Pos.	Drivers	Team	MNZ (Italy)	BRH (United Kingdom)		LEC (France)	6hrs	12hrs	24hrs	MIS (Italy)		NÜR (Germany)	HOC (Germany)		VAL (Spain)		BAR (Spain)	ZAN (Netherlands)		Points
1	Timur Boguslavskiy (Switzerland) Raffaele Marciello	(France) AKKodis ASP Team	Ret	1^{PF}	6	1^{P}	3	2	2	1^{P}	4	1^{PF}	Ret	1	1	7	5	4	Ret	194.5
2	(San Marino) Mattia Drudi (Switzerland) Ricardo Feller	(Germany) Tresor Orange1 (Germany) Audi Sport Tresor Orange1	5	2	1	Ret	6	1	7	10	Ret	3	1^{F}	4	3	2	Ret	1^{P}	1	156.5
3	(Belgium) Dries Vanthoor (Belgium) Charles Weerts	(Belgium) Team WRT	6	3	3	Ret	1	52†	Ret	3^{F}	9^{P}	7	3	5	5	1	11	5	2	112.5
4	(Andorra) Jules Gounon	(France) AKKodis ASP Team	Ret			1^{P}	3	2	2			1^{PF}					5			104
5	(Austria) Philipp Eng (Germany) Marco Wittmann (United Kingdom) Nick Yelloly	(Germany) ROWE Racing	1^{P}			3	8	6	1			15					10			77
6	(Belgium) Maxime Martin (Italy) Valentino Rossi	(Belgium) Team WRT	Ret	14	2	8	13	9	6	8	1	49†	8	7	8	Ret	Ret	3	7^{P}	63
7	(Spain) Albert Costa (Netherlands) Thierry Vermeulen	(Switzerland) Emil Frey Racing		7	23^{F}					5	5		4	6	2	3		2	8	62.5
8	(Germany) Maro Engel	(Oman) Mercedes-AMG Team AlManar	Ret			2						2					4			61
8	(Germany) Maro Engel	(Hong Kong) Mercedes-AMG Team GruppeM Racing					19	3	Ret											61
9	(Germany) Christopher Haase	(Belgium) Comtoyou Racing (Belgium) Audi Sport Team Comtoyou	Ret	4	5	42†	18	16	8	9	2	8	7	2	4	9	49†	Ret	12	58
10	(Germany) Fabian Schiller	(Oman) Mercedes-AMG Team AlManar	Ret			2	9	15	9			2					4			57
10	(Germany) Fabian Schiller	(Saudi Arabia) Theeba Motorsport								24	Ret		22	32	30	21				57
10	(Germany) Luca Stolz	(Oman) Mercedes-AMG Team AlManar	Ret			2	9	15	9			2					4			57
11	(Switzerland) Patric Niederhauser	(France) Saintéloc Junior Team (France) Audi Sport Team Saintéloc	4	28†	10	4	23	24	16	17	7	4	31†	3	12	17	9	Ret	Ret	54
12	(Switzerland) Lucas Légeret	(Belgium) Comtoyou Racing		4	5		33	22	19	9	2		7	2	4	9		Ret	12	50
12	(Switzerland) Lucas Légeret	(France) CSA Racing				38^{F}														50
13	(Germany) Dennis Marschall	(Germany) Tresor Orange1 (Germany) Audi Sport Tresor Orange1 (Germany) Tresor Attempto Racing	5			Ret	6	1	7	36	22^{F}	3	18	DSQ	18^{P}	23	Ret			48
14	(France) Simon Gachet	(France) Saintéloc Junior Team (France) Audi Sport Team Saintéloc	4	11	13	4	23	24	16	19	24	4	13	Ret	21	6	9	24	15	46.5
15	(Germany) Christopher Mies	(France) Saintéloc Junior Team (France) Audi Sport Team Saintéloc	4	19	17^{P}	4	23	24	16	22	18	4	23	Ret	Ret	Ret	9	Ret	22	42
16	(Italy) Giacomo Altoè (Finland) Konsta Lappalainen	(Switzerland) Emil Frey Racing		5	8					2	6		Ret	12	7	5		10	5	41
17	(Germany) Laurin Heinrich	(Germany) Rutronik Racing	10^{F}			Ret	12	8	5			5					3			38.5
17	(Germany) Laurin Heinrich	(France) CLRT																16	10	38.5
18	(Norway) Dennis Olsen (Austria) Thomas Preining	(Germany) Rutronik Racing	10^{F}			Ret	12	8	5			5					3			38
19	(Denmark) Nicklas Nielsen (Italy) Alessio Rovera (Israel) Robert Shwartzman	(Italy) AF Corse - Francorchamps Motors	8			7	29	25	44†			22					1^{P}			36
20	(Belgium) Nicolas Baert	(Belgium) Comtoyou Racing	7	8	20	9	34	26	21	4	15	21	2	16	6	10	35	9	Ret	35.5
21	(Belgium) Frédéric Vervisch	(Belgium) Comtoyou Racing (Belgium) Audi Sport Team Comtoyou	Ret	8	20	42†	18	16	8	4	15	8	2	16	6	10	49†	9	Ret	35.5
22	(United Kingdom) Daniel Harper (Germany) Max Hesse (United States) Neil Verhagen	(Germany) ROWE Racing	2			6	4	53†	Ret			11					12			33
23	(Italy) Antonio Fuoco (Italy) Davide Rigon	(Italy) AF Corse - Francorchamps Motors	14			5	7	17	11			14					2			33
23	(Brazil) Daniel Serra	(Italy) AF Corse - Francorchamps Motors				5	7	17	11			14					2			33
24	(South Africa) Jordan Pepper	(Italy) Iron Lynx	3			39†	61	Ret	Ret			Ret					20			26.5
24	(South Africa) Jordan Pepper	(Italy) VSR		6	25†					7	8		32†^{P}	9						26.5
25	(South Africa) Sheldon van der Linde	(Belgium) Team WRT	6			Ret	1	52†	Ret			7					11			26
26	(Italy) Andrea Caldarelli	(Italy) Iron Lynx	3			39†	61	Ret	Ret			Ret					20			24.5
26	(Italy) Andrea Caldarelli	(Italy) VSR													15	12		8	4	24.5
27	(South Africa) Kelvin van der Linde (Germany) Luca Engstler (Denmark) Nicki Thiim	(Germany) Scherer Sport PHX					2	12	3											24
28	(France) Kévin Estre (France) Julien Andlauer (Belgium) Laurens Vanthoor	(Germany) Manthey EMA					5	7	4											20
29	(Germany) Niklas Krütten (Australia) Calan Williams	(Belgium) Team WRT	12	15	7	Ret	20	18	14	11	11	16	5	30	Ret	18	21	14	3	18.5
30	(Italy) Mirko Bortolotti (Italy) Andrea Caldarelli (South Africa) Jordan Pepper	(Italy) Iron Lynx	3			39†	61	Ret	Ret			Ret					20			15
31	(Germany) Benjamin Goethe (Denmark) Nicolai Kjærgaard	(United Kingdom) Garage 59	19	16	4	12	10	59†	Ret	Ret	10	13	Ret	34†	9	15	8^{F}	18	9	14
32	(Germany) Christian Engelhart	(Italy) Dinamic GT Huber Racing (Italy) Dinamic GT	9	DSQ	12	Ret	16	13	12	20	Ret	10	9	8	17	16	6	Ret	16	14
33	(France) Franck Perera	(United States) K-Pax Racing	Ret			23	17	11	29			9					44			13.5
33	(France) Franck Perera	(Italy) VSR		6	25†					7	8		32†^{P}	9						13.5
34	(France) Erwan Bastard	(France) Saintéloc Junior Team	41	28†	10	24	47	43	30	17	7	35	31†	3	12	17	23	Ret	Ret	13
35	(Brazil) Augusto Farfus	(Belgium) Team WRT	Ret			8	13	9	6			49†					Ret			13
36	(France) Thomas Neubauer	(Belgium) Team WRT		13	14					15	3		11	11	16	29		7	13	12.5
36	(France) Thomas Neubauer	(Germany) Walkenhorst Motorsport	22			Ret	45	31	46†			41								12.5
36	(France) Jean-Baptiste Simmenauer	(Belgium) Team WRT	12	13	14	Ret	20	18	14	15	3	16	11	11	16	29	21	7	13	12.5
37	(Italy) Marco Mapelli	(United States) K-Pax Racing	Ret			23	17	11	29			9					44			11.5
37	(Italy) Marco Mapelli	(Italy) VSR													15	12		8	4	11.5
38	(Turkey) Ayhancan Güven	(Italy) Dinamic GT Huber Racing (Italy) Dinamic GT	9			Ret	16	13	12			10					6			11.5
38	(Turkey) Ayhancan Güven	(Lithuania) Pure Rxcing								21	21				19	19				11.5
38	(Turkey) Ayhancan Güven	(France) CLRT																16	10	11.5
39	(Germany) Sven Müller	(Italy) Dinamic GT Huber Racing (Italy) Dinamic GT	9			Ret	16	13	12			10					6			11
40	(Australia) Jordan Love	(Germany) Haupt Racing Team		20	16		36	34	24	12	16		12	14	11	13		6	6	9
40	(United Kingdom) Frank Bird	(Germany) Haupt Racing Team		20	16		50	47	Ret	12	16							6	6	9
41	(Switzerland) Miklas Born (Germany) David Schumacher (Germany) Marius Zug	(United States) Winward Racing	26			10	22	58†	Ret			6					14			9
42	(Germany) Alex Aka (Italy) Lorenzo Patrese	(Germany) Tresor Attempto Racing (Germany) Tresor Orange1	Ret	10	21	15	21	23	47†	18	12	18	33†	13	10	4	28	13	25†	8.5
43	(Italy) Alberto Di Folco (France) Aurélien Panis	(Belgium) Boutsen VDS	Ret	9	26	11	14	46	32	6	Ret	20	10	10	29	8	13	11	17	8.5
44	(Belgium) Maxime Soulet	(Belgium) Comtoyou Racing	7			9	34	26	21			21					35			8
44	(Austria) Max Hofer	(Belgium) Comtoyou Racing	7			9	34	26	21								35			8
45	(Spain) Daniel Juncadella (Canada) Mikaël Grenier	(Hong Kong) Mercedes-AMG Team GruppeM Racing					19	3	Ret											7
46	(United Kingdom) Sam De Haan (United Kingdom) Charlie Fagg	(United Kingdom) Optimum Motorsport	11			Ret	31	4	10			45					Ret			7
46	(United Kingdom) Tom Gamble	(United Kingdom) Optimum Motorsport					31	4	10											7
46	(United Kingdom) Dean MacDonald	(United Kingdom) Optimum Motorsport	11			Ret	31	4	10			45					Ret			7
46	(United Kingdom) Dean MacDonald	(Luxembourg) JP Motorsport		21	11					Ret	37†		30†	Ret	13	11		23	18	7
47	(France) Thomas Drouet (Italy) Lorenzo Ferrari (Germany) Maximilian Götz	(France) Mercedes-AMG Team AKKodis ASP	13			13	15	10	Ret			Ret					7			6
48	(France) Paul Evrard	(France) Saintéloc Junior Team	41	11	13	24	47	43	30	19	24	35	13	Ret	21	6	23	24	15	5.5
49	(Portugal) Henrique Chaves (Portugal) Miguel Ramos	(United Kingdom) Garage 59	20			33†	11	5	34	13	20	25	29	23	22	25	18			5
49	(Monaco) Louis Prette	(United Kingdom) Garage 59	20			33†	11	5	34			25					18			5
49	(United States) Conrad Grunewald	(United Kingdom) Garage 59					11	5	34											5
50	(Belgium) Gilles Magnus	(Belgium) Comtoyou Racing (Belgium) Audi Sport Team Comtoyou	Ret	17	9	42†	18	16	8	Ret	19	21	26	15	14	14	49†	15	11	5
51	(France) César Gazeau	(Belgium) Boutsen VDS	33	12	28†	21	41	63†	Ret	14	17	38	6	19	36	24	Ret	12	26†	4.5
51	(France) Adam Eteki	(Belgium) Boutsen VDS	Ret	12	28†	11	14	46	32	14	17	20	6	19	36	24	13	12	26†	4.5
52	(Belgium) Kobe Pauwels	(Belgium) Comtoyou Racing										8								4
52	(Germany) Marvin Kirchhöfer	(United Kingdom) Garage 59	19			12	10	59†	Ret			13					8^{F}			4
53	(Belgium) Adrien de Leener	(Italy) Dinamic GT Huber Racing		DSQ	12		51	41	31	20	Ret		9	8	17	16		Ret	16	3
54	(Austria) Lucas Auer	(Oman) Mercedes-AMG Team AlManar					9	15	9											3
54	(Austria) Lucas Auer	(Germany) GetSpeed															45†			3
55	(Italy) Marco Mapelli (United Kingdom) Sandy Mitchell (France) Franck Perera	(United States) K-Pax Racing	Ret			23	17	11	29			9					44			2
56	(United Kingdom) Finlay Hutchison	(Belgium) Comtoyou Racing	16	17	9	19	33	22	19	Ret	19	27	26	15	14	14	33	15	11	1
57	Andrey Mukovoz	(Germany) Tresor Attempto Racing	31			27	43	29	28	36	22^{F}	31	18	DSQ	18^{P}	23	42			1
57	(United Kingdom) Alex Malykhin	(Lithuania) Pure Rxcing	15			Ret	25	21	15	21	21	26	20	22	19	19	Ret			1
57	(Austria) Klaus Bachler	(Lithuania) Pure Rxcing	15			Ret	25	21	15			26	20	22			Ret			1
57	(Germany) Joel Sturm	(Lithuania) Pure Rxcing	15			Ret	25	21	15			26					Ret			1
57	(Germany) Marco Seefried	(Lithuania) Pure Rxcing					25	21	15											1
57	(France) Grégoire Demoustier	(France) Saintéloc Junior Team	41	19	17^{P}	24	47	43	30	22	18	35	23	Ret	Ret	Ret	23	Ret	22	1
Pos.	Drivers	Team	MNZ (Italy)	BRH (United Kingdom)		LEC (France)	SPA (Belgium)			MIS (Italy)		NÜR (Germany)	HOC (Germany)		VAL (Spain)		BAR (Spain)	ZAN (Netherlands)		Points
Pos.	Drivers	Team	MNZ (Italy)	BRH (United Kingdom)		LEC (France)	6hrs	12hrs	24hrs	MIS (Italy)		NÜR (Germany)	HOC (Germany)		VAL (Spain)		BAR (Spain)	ZAN (Netherlands)		Points

Key
Colour	Result
Gold	Race winner
Silver	2nd place
Bronze	3rd place
Green	Points finish
Blue	Non-points finish
Blue	Non-classified finish (NC)
Purple	Did not finish (Ret)
Black	Disqualified (DSQ)
Black	Excluded (EX)
White	Did not start (DNS)
White	Race cancelled (C)
White	Withdrew (WD)
Blank	Did not participate

^{P} – Pole
^{F} – Fastest Lap

Notes:

- † – Entry did not finish the race but was classified, as it completed more than 75% of the race distance.

== See also ==
- 2023 British GT Championship
- 2023 GT World Challenge Europe Endurance Cup
- 2023 GT World Challenge Europe Sprint Cup
- 2023 GT World Challenge Asia
- 2023 GT World Challenge America
- 2023 GT World Challenge Australia
- 2023 Intercontinental GT Challenge
