= AKK-Motorsport =

AKK-Motorsport is a Finnish motorsport organisation which governs over 320 member clubs in the country. The organisation is a member of Fédération Internationale de l'Automobile, and representing Finland there is its most important duty. AKK-Motorsport has divided Finland into 8 sections, which all have their local committees. They organise driver examination and education.

As of 2016, the president of the AKK-Motorsport is Juhani Pakari.

== Results ==
=== FIA Motorsport Games F4 Cup ===
Season	Car	Drivers	Races	Wins	Poles	F/Laps	Points	D.C.
2019	KCMG-01	(Finland) William Alatalo	2	0	0	0	N/A	3rd

=== SMP F4 Championship ===
Season	Car	Drivers	Races	Wins	Poles	F/Laps	Points	D.C.
2017	Tatuus F4-T014	(Finland) Sami-Matti Trogen	21	0	1	0	208	4th
2017	Tatuus F4-T014	(Finland) Tuomas Haapalainen	21	2	1	1	86	9th
2017	Tatuus F4-T014	(Finland) Elias Niskanen	15	0	0	0	19	14th
