= 2018 ADAC Formula 4 Championship =

Fourth season of the ADAC Formula 4

The 2018 ADAC Formula 4 Championship was the fourth season of the ADAC Formula 4, an open-wheel motor racing series. It was a multi-event motor racing championship that featured drivers competing in 1.4 litre Tatuus-Abarth single seat race cars that conformed to the technical regulations for the championship. It began on 14 April at Oschersleben and finished on 23 September at Hockenheim after seven triple header rounds.

The championship was dominated by US Racing – CHRS driver Lirim Zendeli, who secured the title after race three at the Nürburgring. He extended his wins tally to ten with victory in the season finale at Hockenheim. His success was key for US Racing – CHRS teams' title. Van Amersfoort Racing driver Liam Lawson lost to Zendeli by 114 points with wins at Lausitzring and Spielberg. Prema Theodore Racing driver Enzo Fittipaldi was third with just one win, at Spielberg. Lawson's teammates Frederik Vesti and Charles Weerts were victorious at Hockenheim and Nürburgring, completing the top five in the standings. David Schumacher won the rookie title, defeating fellow German driver Niklas Krütten by 31 points.

== Teams and drivers ==
Team	No.	Driver	Status	Rounds
(Netherlands) Van Amersfoort Racing	2	(Denmark) Frederik Vesti		All
(Netherlands) Van Amersfoort Racing	21	(Belgium) Charles Weerts		All
(Netherlands) Van Amersfoort Racing	22	(Germany) Lucas Alecco Roy		All
(Netherlands) Van Amersfoort Racing	23	(Netherlands) Joey Alders	R	All
(Netherlands) Van Amersfoort Racing	30	(New Zealand) Liam Lawson		All
(Italy) Prema Theodore Racing	3	(Brazil) Caio Collet	R	7
(Italy) Prema Theodore Racing	5	(Brazil) Gianluca Petecof	R	All
(Italy) Prema Theodore Racing	33	(Australia) Jack Doohan	R	2, 5–6
(Italy) Prema Theodore Racing	64	(United Kingdom) Olli Caldwell		All
(Italy) Prema Theodore Racing	74	(Brazil) Enzo Fittipaldi		All
(Germany) ADAC Berlin-Brandenburg	4	(Germany) Niklas Krütten	R	All
(Germany) ADAC Berlin-Brandenburg	6	(Israel) Ido Cohen	R	1–6
(Germany) ADAC Berlin-Brandenburg	26	(Germany) Leon Köhler	R	All
(Germany) ADAC Berlin-Brandenburg	34	(Belgium) Amaury Cordeel	R	4–5
(Germany) US Racing– CHRS	9	(Czech Republic) Petr Ptáček	G	7
(Germany) US Racing– CHRS	27	(Germany) David Schumacher	R	All
(Germany) US Racing– CHRS	28	(Austria) Mick Wishofer		All
(Germany) US Racing– CHRS	44	(Germany) Lirim Zendeli		All
(Germany) US Racing– CHRS	95	(Czech Republic) Tom Beckhäuser		All
(Finland) KIC Driving Academy	10	(Finland) Konsta Lappalainen		1, 3, 5–6
(Finland) KIC Driving Academy	69	(Finland) Jesse Salmenautio	G	1, 5
(Switzerland) Jenzer Motorsport	11	(Argentina) Giorgio Carrara	G	5
(Switzerland) Jenzer Motorsport	12	(Italy) Federico Malvestiti	G	5
(Switzerland) Jenzer Motorsport	16	(Switzerland) Grégoire Saucy	G	5
(Switzerland) KDC Racing	13	(United Kingdom) Aaron di Comberti		1–3
(Switzerland) KDC Racing	14	(Italy) Leonardo Lorandi		1–3
(Austria) Neuhauser Racing	80	(Germany) Andreas Estner		1–5
(Austria) Neuhauser Racing	81	(Germany) Sebastian Estner	R	1–5
(Czech Republic) Václav Šafář	98	(Czech Republic) Václav Šafář	G	5

Icon	Legend
R	Rookie
G	Guest drivers ineligible to score points

== Race calendar ==
Venues for the 2018 season were announced on 19 December 2017 with the first Hockenheim round and the Lausitzring round as 2018 Deutsche Tourenwagen Masters support events, while other event were scheduled to support 2018 ADAC GT Masters. The calendar was altered on 26 March 2018, filling the slot in the 2018 German Grand Prix support package, making a debut for ADAC Formula 4 in the Formula One weekend programme and becoming the first FIA Formula 4 race in the Formula One weekend slot in Europe.

Round		Circuit	Date	Pole position	Fastest lap	Winning driver	Winning team	Rookie winner
1	R1	(Germany) Motorsport Arena Oschersleben, Oschersleben	14 April	(Germany) Lirim Zendeli	(Austria) Mick Wishofer	(Germany) Lirim Zendeli	(Germany) US Racing– CHRS	(Germany) David Schumacher
1	R2	(Germany) Motorsport Arena Oschersleben, Oschersleben	14 April	(Germany) Lirim Zendeli	(Germany) Lirim Zendeli	(Germany) Lirim Zendeli	(Germany) US Racing– CHRS	(Brazil) Gianluca Petecof
1	R3	(Germany) Motorsport Arena Oschersleben, Oschersleben	15 April		(Austria) Mick Wishofer	(United Kingdom) Olli Caldwell	(Italy) Prema Theodore Racing	(Germany) Niklas Krütten
2	R1	(Germany) Hockenheimring, Hockenheim	5 May	(Germany) Lirim Zendeli	(Germany) Lirim Zendeli	(Germany) Lirim Zendeli	(Germany) US Racing– CHRS	(Germany) David Schumacher
2	R2	(Germany) Hockenheimring, Hockenheim	5 May	(Germany) Lirim Zendeli	(Germany) Lirim Zendeli	(Germany) Lirim Zendeli	(Germany) US Racing– CHRS	(Netherlands) Joey Alders
2	R3	(Germany) Hockenheimring, Hockenheim	6 May		(Austria) Mick Wishofer	(Austria) Mick Wishofer	(Germany) US Racing– CHRS	(Germany) Niklas Krütten
3	R1	(Germany) Lausitzring, Klettwitz	19 May	(Germany) Lirim Zendeli	(Brazil) Enzo Fittipaldi	(New Zealand) Liam Lawson	(Netherlands) Van Amersfoort Racing	(Israel) Ido Cohen
3	R2	(Germany) Lausitzring, Klettwitz	19 May	(Germany) Lirim Zendeli	(Belgium) Charles Weerts	(Germany) Lirim Zendeli	(Germany) US Racing – CHRS	(Germany) David Schumacher
3	R3	(Germany) Lausitzring, Klettwitz	20 May		(Denmark) Frederik Vesti	(New Zealand) Liam Lawson	(Netherlands) Van Amersfoort Racing	(Germany) Niklas Krütten
4	R1	(Austria) Red Bull Ring, Spielberg	9 June	(Brazil) Enzo Fittipaldi	(Belgium) Charles Weerts	(Brazil) Enzo Fittipaldi	(Italy) Prema Theodore Racing	(Germany) David Schumacher
4	R2	(Austria) Red Bull Ring, Spielberg	9 June	(Brazil) Enzo Fittipaldi	(Brazil) Enzo Fittipaldi	(Germany) Lirim Zendeli	(Germany) US Racing– CHRS	(Germany) Niklas Krütten
4	R3	(Austria) Red Bull Ring, Spielberg	10 June		(Brazil) Enzo Fittipaldi	(New Zealand) Liam Lawson	(Netherlands) Van Amersfoort Racing	(Germany) Niklas Krütten
5	R1	(Germany) Hockenheimring, Hockenheim	21 July	(Denmark) Frederik Vesti	(Germany) Lirim Zendeli	(Denmark) Frederik Vesti	(Netherlands) Van Amersfoort Racing	(Germany) David Schumacher
5	R2	(Germany) Hockenheimring, Hockenheim	22 July	(New Zealand) Liam Lawson	(Germany) Lirim Zendeli	(Germany) Lirim Zendeli	(Germany) US Racing– CHRS	(Australia) Jack Doohan
6	R1	(Germany) Nürburgring, Nürburg	4 August	(Germany) Lirim Zendeli	(Denmark) Frederik Vesti	(Germany) Lirim Zendeli	(Germany) US Racing– CHRS	(Germany) David Schumacher
6	R2	(Germany) Nürburgring, Nürburg	4 August	(Germany) Lirim Zendeli	(Denmark) Frederik Vesti	(Denmark) Frederik Vesti	(Netherlands) Van Amersfoort Racing	(Germany) David Schumacher
6	R3	(Germany) Nürburgring, Nürburg	5 August		(Australia) Jack Doohan	(Germany) Niklas Krütten	(Germany) ADAC Berlin-Brandenburg	(Germany) Niklas Krütten
7	R1	(Germany) Hockenheimring, Hockenheim	22 September	(New Zealand) Liam Lawson	(Germany) Lirim Zendeli	(Belgium) Charles Weerts	(Netherlands) Van Amersfoort Racing	(Germany) David Schumacher
7	R2	(Germany) Hockenheimring, Hockenheim	22 September	(New Zealand) Liam Lawson	(Germany) Lirim Zendeli	(Germany) Lirim Zendeli	(Germany) US Racing– CHRS	(Brazil) Caio Collet
7	R3	(Germany) Hockenheimring, Hockenheim	23 September		(Germany) Lirim Zendeli	(Germany) Lirim Zendeli	(Germany) US Racing– CHRS	(Germany) Leon Köhler

== Championship standings ==
Points were awarded to the top 10 classified finishers in each race. No points were awarded for pole position or fastest lap.

Position	**1st**	**2nd**	**3rd**	**4th**	**5th**	**6th**	**7th**	**8th**	**9th**	**10th**
Points	25	18	15	12	10	8	6	4	2	1

=== Drivers' Cup ===
Pos	Driver	OSC (Germany)			HOC1 (Germany)			LAU (Germany)			RBR (Austria)			HOC2 (Germany)		NÜR (Germany)			HOC3 (Germany)			Pts
1	(Germany) Lirim Zendeli	**1**	**1**	Ret	**1**	**1**	3	**11**	**1**	4	4	1	5	3	1	**1**	**2**	5	7	1	1	348
2	(New Zealand) Liam Lawson	3	17	17	2	2	6	1	2	1	3	6	1	2	**18**	6	15	14	**2**	**3**	16	234
3	(Brazil) Enzo Fittipaldi	4	3	2	5	Ret	7	2	6	6	**1**	**2**	18	4	3	2	3	3	5	Ret	14	223
4	(Denmark) Frederik Vesti	6	2	4	6	3	8	Ret	Ret	5	2	5	2	**1**	11	3	1	6	3	Ret	13	211
5	(Belgium) Charles Weerts	Ret	4	3	7	4	4	10	5	2	5	Ret	8	8	8	7	5	4	1	4	2	195
6	(Austria) Mick Wishofer	2	Ret	7	Ret	7	1	3	4	3	9	3	6	14	Ret	8	16	Ret	4	2	8	160
7	(United Kingdom) Olli Caldwell	10	8	1	3	15	10	Ret	3	7	8	4	4	Ret	2	Ret	9	7	10	12	9	125
8	(Germany) Niklas Krütten	9	9	5	Ret	8	2	Ret	12	8	12	7	3	Ret	9	9	7	1	12	8	7	108
9	(Germany) David Schumacher	5	13	13	4	9	15	9	7	18	6	Ret	7	5	12	4	4	8	6	14	5	103
10	(Brazil) Gianluca Petecof	8	6	15	Ret	18	9	Ret	Ret	9	7	Ret	17	6	7	5	6	2	Ret	7	4	92
11	(Netherlands) Joey Alders	Ret	11	6	Ret	5	11	Ret	8	14	11	Ret	10	9	6	Ret	10	Ret	9	10	15	44
12	(Australia) Jack Doohan				8	6	5							12	4	Ret	Ret	12				35
13	(Germany) Leon Köhler	12	10	16	Ret	12	16	Ret	10	10	14	9	11	17	Ret	10	8	Ret	Ret	6	3	33
14	(Germany) Andreas Estner	13	5	Ret	9	16	Ret	5	Ret	19	17	8	9	16	14							28
15	(Finland) Konsta Lappalainen	7	DSQ	11				4	15	11				20	22†	12	13	11				19
16	(Brazil) Caio Collet																		14	5	6	18
17	(Italy) Leonardo Lorandi	Ret	7	14	11	Ret	18	6	11	Ret												14
18	(Germany) Lucas Alecco Roy	16	12	8	Ret	11	12	Ret	9	15	10	Ret	16	10	21†	13	12	10	13	13	11	11
19	(Israel) Ido Cohen	Ret	16	Ret	14	13	14	8	14	13	13	10	14	18	13	14	11	9				7
20	(United Kingdom) Aaron di Comberti	14	Ret	Ret	13	17	19	7	17	17												6
21	(Czech Republic) Tom Beckhäuser	11	14	12	10	10	13	Ret	16	16	15	12	12	13	20	11	14	13	11	11	12	4
22	(Germany) Sebastian Estner	15	18	10	12	14	17	Ret	13	12	16	11	13	19	15							2
23	(Belgium) Amaury Cordeel										Ret	Ret	15	21	17							0
**Drivers ineligible to score points**
-	(Switzerland) Grégoire Saucy													11	5							-
-	(Italy) Federico Malvestiti													7	10							-
-	(Czech Republic) Petr Ptáček																		8	9	10	-
-	(Finland) Jesse Salmenautio	DNS	15	9										23	19							-
-	(Argentina) Giorgio Carrara													15	23†							-
-	(Czech Republic) Václav Šafář													22	16							-
Pos	Driver	OSC (Germany)			HOC1 (Germany)			LAU (Germany)			RBR (Austria)			HOC2 (Germany)		NÜR (Germany)			HOC3 (Germany)			Pts

Colour	Result
Gold	Winner
Silver	Second place
Bronze	Third place
Green	Points classification
Blue	Non-points classification
Blue	Non-classified finish (NC)
Purple	Retired, not classified (Ret)
Red	Did not qualify (DNQ)
Red	Did not pre-qualify (DNPQ)
Black	Disqualified (DSQ)
White	Did not start (DNS)
White	Withdrew (WD)
White	Race cancelled (C)
Blank	Did not practice (DNP)
Blank	Did not arrive (DNA)
Blank	Excluded (EX)

**Bold** – Pole
Italics – Fastest Lap

Notes:

- † – Drivers did not finish the race, but were classified as they completed more than 90% of the race distance.

=== Rookies' Cup ===
Pos	Driver	OSC (Germany)			HOC1 (Germany)			LAU (Germany)			RBR (Austria)			HOC2 (Germany)		NÜR (Germany)			HOC3 (Germany)			Pts
1	(Germany) David Schumacher	5	13	13	4	9	15	9	7	18	6	Ret	7	5	12	4	4	8	5	14	5	332
2	(Germany) Niklas Krütten	9	9	5	Ret	8	2	Ret	12	8	12	7	3	Ret	9	9	7	1	12	8	7	301
3	(Brazil) Gianluca Petecof	8	6	15	Ret	18	12	Ret	Ret	9	7	Ret	17	6	7	5	6	2	Ret	7	4	232
4	(Netherlands) Joey Alders	Ret	11	6	Ret	5	11	Ret	8	14	11	Ret	10	9	6	Ret	10	Ret	9	10	15	202
5	(Germany) Leon Köhler	12	10	16	Ret	12	16	Ret	10	10	14	9	11	17	Ret	10	8	Ret	Ret	6	3	196
6	(Israel) Ido Cohen	Ret	16	Ret	14	13	14	8	14	13	13	10	14	18	13	14	11	9				160
7	(Germany) Sebastian Estner	15	18	10	12	14	17	Ret	13	12	16	11	13	19	15							118
8	(Australia) Jack Doohan				8	6	5							12	4	Ret	Ret	12				101
9	(Brazil) Caio Collet																		14	5	6	49
10	(Belgium) Amaury Cordeel										Ret	Ret	15	21	17							14
Pos	Driver	OSC (Germany)			HOC1 (Germany)			LAU (Germany)			RBR (Austria)			HOC2 (Germany)		NÜR (Germany)			HOC3 (Germany)			Pts

=== Teams' Cup ===
Pos	Team	Points
1	(Germany) US Racing– CHRS	562
2	(Netherlands) Van Amersfoort Racing	521
3	(Italy) Prema Theodore Racing	416
4	(Germany) ADAC Berlin-Brandenburg	275
5	(Austria) Neuhauser Racing	104
6	(Finland) KIC Driving Academy	51
7	(Switzerland) KDC Racing	49
