= Japan Automobile Federation =

Japanese automobile association

Japanese Automobile Federation
- 一般社団法人日本自動車連盟
- Abbreviation: JAF
- Formation: 1963; 63 years ago
- Location: Minato, Tokyo, Japan
- President: Kazuhiro Fujii
- Website: jaf.or.jp

The Japan Automobile Federation (一般社団法人日本自動車連盟, Nihonjidōsharenmei) is an automobile association based in Minato, Tokyo. Founded in 1963, the main purpose of the organization is to handle various businesses related to automobiles, and to protect the interests of owners and drivers in Japan. As of 2021, the organization has 19.9 million members. It is the only organization in Japan that is a member of the FIA.

== Structure ==
The JAF's main businesses are road and repair services, as well as the Super Formula Championship, Super GT and other various motor sports events held in Japan. Previously, drift competitions were not under the jurisdiction, but official recognition began in 2013, and some of the existing drift competition series such as Drift Muscle are under the jurisdiction of JAF.

In addition to issuing international numbers, the JAF is the only organization in Japan to recognize the legal effect of foreign language translation documents required for switching to a foreign driver's license. Besides services for members, they are also engaged in activities to raise awareness of traffic safety and global environmental conservation issues, and to request activities to revise the automobile tax system.

At one point, it was reported that the JAF was considering entering the doctor helicopter business in 2010, but eventually they decided against entering it. Instead, it contributes support to the existing emergency helicopter management organization.
