= MotorSport New Zealand =

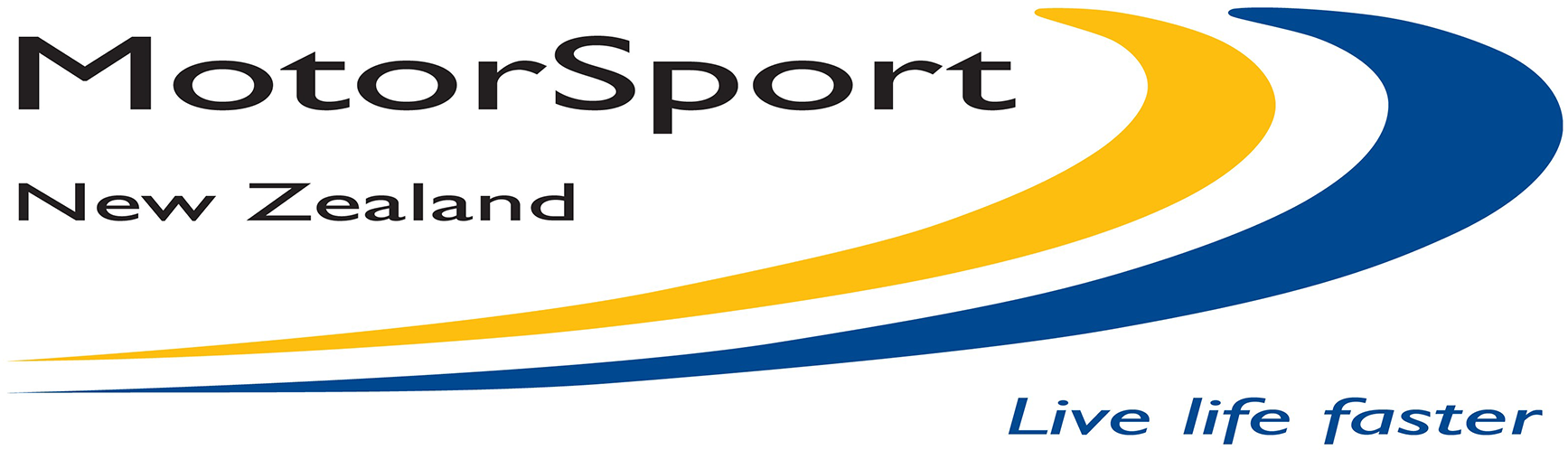
- Sport: Motorsport
- Jurisdiction: New Zealand
- Abbreviation: MSNZ
- Founded: 1947
- Affiliation: Fédération Internationale de l'Automobile
- Headquarters: Wellington, New Zealand
- President: Deborah Day
- CEO: Mike Hartley

Official website
- motorsport.org.nz
- (New Zealand)

Motorsport New Zealand is the national governing and sanctioning body for four-wheeled motorsport in New Zealand. It is affiliated with the Federation Internationale de l'Automobile (FIA).

== Responsibilities ==
As well as the competitors’, officials and member clubs, MotorSport New Zealand has responsibilities to the motor trade and other supporters, government, the public and to the FIA. Together with its organisational role, MotorSport New Zealand is concerned with the fitness of drivers, circuit (including all courses and tracks) safety, the construction and eligibility of vehicles, all aspects of safety, administration of justice and the progress of motorsports in New Zealand.

MotorSport New Zealand has been a member of the FIA since 1956. Initially, membership was through the RAC who was the controlling body for motorsport in the British Commonwealth, and direct membership followed on the dismantling of the British Commonwealth in the early 1970s.

== History ==
MotorSport New Zealand was initially inaugurated in October 1947 as the Association of New Zealand Car Clubs. Incorporation was achieved in November 1950 and in 1967, with a membership of 58 clubs, the name was changed to Motorsport Association of New Zealand Inc.

In 1996, the name was changed to its present title. Membership of the organisation has continued to expand since with now around 100 member clubs holding membership.

== New Zealand Grand Prix ==
MotorSport New Zealand is one of only two ASN's permitted the official use of "Grand Prix" outside of Formula 1. The New Zealand Grand Prix was first held in 1950 at the Ohakea Circuit. The winners include international stars such as Stirling Moss, Jack Brabham, John Surtees, Graham Hill, Jackie Stewart, Keke Rosberg, Lance Stroll and Lando Norris. Homegrown heroes Bruce McLaren, Chris Amon, Ken Smith, Craig Baird, Greg Murphy, Mitch Evans, Earl Bamber, Nick Cassidy and Liam Lawson have also won the prestigious race.
