= German Motor Sport Federation =

German Motor Sport Federation (Deutscher Motor Sport Bund)
- Sport: Auto Racing
- Category: Various discipline of motorsport
- Jurisdiction: Germany; Europe
- Founded: 1947
- Affiliation: FIA and FIM
- Affiliation date: 2003
- Headquarters: Frankfurt, Germany
- President: Hans-Joachim Stuck

Official website
- www.dmsb.de
- (Germany)
- (European Union)

The German Motor Sport Federation (German: Deutscher Motor Sport Bund or DMSB, formerly known as Oberste Nationale Sportbehörde or ONS) is Germany's motor racing governing body. It represents Germany at FIA and FIM.

The DMSB-Staffel, founded in 1972 by Herbert Linge as ONS-Staffel, is considered the first mobile track marshaling crew, equipped with fast cars like Porsche 914 or Porsche 911, carrying fire extinguishers and doctors in order to arrive quickly at a crash site.

== Member clubs ==
- Allgemeiner Deutscher Automobil-Club (ADAC), founded 1903
- Automobilclub von Deutschland (AvD), founded 1899
- Deutscher Motorsport Verband (DMV), founded 1923

== Racing series organized by DMSB ==
- F3 Euroseries
- FIA European Formula Three Championship
- ATS Formel 3 Cup
- Deutsche Motorrad-Straßenmeisterschaft

=== ITR e.V. ===
- Deutsche Tourenwagen Masters (until 2022)

== Motorsport Team Germany ==
The Motorsport Team Germany is a squad containing young up-and-coming German talents in car racing, rallying and motorcycling.

=== Current members ===
Driver	Discipline
(Germany) Oliver Goethe	Formula racing
(Germany) Tom Kalender	Formula racing
(Germany) Montego Maassen	Formula racing
(Germany) Mathilda Paatz	Formula racing
(Germany) Tim Tramnitz	Formula racing
(Germany) Daniel Gregor	GT racing
(Germany) Laurin Heinrich	GT racing
(Germany) Max Hesse	GT racing
(Germany) Theo Oeverhaus	GT racing
(Germany) Simon Connor Primm	GT racing
(Germany) Phil Colin Strenge	Karting
(Germany) Elias Weiss	Karting
(Germany) Valentino Catalano	LMP
(Germany) Samuel Drews	Rallying
(Germany) Timo Schulz	Rallying
(Germany) Fabio Schwarz	Rallying
(Germany) Norick Blödorn	Motorcycle speedway
(Germany) Patrick Hyjek	Motorcycle speedway
(Germany) Janek Konzack	Motorcycle speedway
(Germany) Luca Fischeder	Enduro
(Germany) Fynn Hannemann	Enduro
(Germany) Felix Melnikoff	Enduro
(Germany) Milan Schmüser	Enduro
(Germany) Maximilian Wills	Enduro
(Germany) Jonathan Frank	Motocross
(Germany) Simon Längenfelder	Motocross
(Germany) Alexandra Massury	Motocross
(Germany) Maximilian Spies	Motocross
(Germany) Maximilian Werner	Motocross
(Germany) Fynn Kratochwil	Motorcycle Road Racing
(Germany) Rocco Sessler	Motorcycle Road Racing
(Germany) Anina Urlaß	Motorcycle Road Racing
(Germany) Thias Wenzel	Motorcycle Road Racing
(Germany) Johannes Heidel	Trial
(Germany) Fabio Sacht	Trial
