= 2019 Formula 4 UAE Championship =

Motor racing competition

Seasons
- ← 2017–18 2020 →

The 2019 Formula 4 UAE Championship was the third season of the Formula 4 UAE Championship, a motor racing series for the United Arab Emirates regulated according to FIA Formula 4 regulations, and organised and promoted by the Automobile & Touring Club of the UAE (ATCUAE) and AUH Motorsports.

It began on 9 January 2019 at the Dubai Autodrome and finished on 2 March 2019 at the same location.

== Teams and drivers ==
Team	No.	Drivers	Rounds
(United Arab Emirates) Xcel Motorsport	3	(Oman) Shihab Al Habsi	All
(United Arab Emirates) Xcel Motorsport	14	(Italy) Nicola Marinangeli	1–4
(United Arab Emirates) Xcel Motorsport	15	(Italy) Matteo Nannini	All
(United Arab Emirates) Xcel Motorsport	26	(Spain) Rafael Villanueva Jr.	All
(United Arab Emirates) Xcel Motorsport	13	(Netherlands) Tijmen van der Helm	2–3
(United Arab Emirates) Dragon Racing	7	(Czech Republic) Roman Staněk	5
(United Arab Emirates) Dragon Racing	8	(Monaco) Lucas Alecco Roy (Note: Roy is a German driver competing under a Monégasque licence.)	All
(United Arab Emirates) Dragon Racing	9	(Lebanon) Rashed Ghanem	All
(United Arab Emirates) Dragon Racing	88	(Portugal) Rui Andrade (Note: Andrade is an Angolan driver competing under a Portuguese licence.)	All
(Germany) Mücke Motorsport	2	(Germany) Niklas Krütten	5
(Germany) Mücke Motorsport	22	(United Arab Emirates) Nico Göhler (Note: Göhler is a German driver competing under an Emirati licence.)	All
(Germany) Mücke Motorsport	27	(Paraguay) Joshua Dürksen	All
(Italy) Cram Motorsport	55	(Poland) Filip Kaminiarz	All

== Race calendar ==
Round		Circuit	Date	Pole position	Fastest lap	Winning driver	Winning team	Supporting
1	R1	Dubai Autodrome, Dubai (Grand Prix Circuit)	10 January	(Italy) Matteo Nannini	(Italy) Matteo Nannini	(Italy) Matteo Nannini	(United Arab Emirates) Xcel Motorsport	Dubai 24 Hour
1	R2	Dubai Autodrome, Dubai (Grand Prix Circuit)	10 January		(Italy) Matteo Nannini	(Monaco) Lucas Alecco Roy	(United Arab Emirates) Dragon Racing	Dubai 24 Hour
1	R3	Dubai Autodrome, Dubai (Grand Prix Circuit)	11 January	(Italy) Matteo Nannini	(Paraguay) Joshua Dürksen	(Oman) Shihab Al Habsi	(United Arab Emirates) Xcel Motorsport	Dubai 24 Hour
1	R4	Dubai Autodrome, Dubai (Grand Prix Circuit)	11 January		(Portugal) Rui Andrade	(Paraguay) Joshua Dürksen	(Germany) Mücke Motorsport	Dubai 24 Hour
2	R1	Yas Marina Circuit, Abu Dhabi (Grand Prix Circuit)	1 February	(Paraguay) Joshua Dürksen	(Monaco) Lucas Alecco Roy	(Italy) Matteo Nannini	(United Arab Emirates) Xcel Motorsport	Yas Racing Series
2	R2	Yas Marina Circuit, Abu Dhabi (Grand Prix Circuit)	2 February		(Oman) Shihab Al Habsi	(Paraguay) Joshua Dürksen	(Germany) Mücke Motorsport	Yas Racing Series
2	R3	Yas Marina Circuit, Abu Dhabi (Grand Prix Circuit)	2 February	(Paraguay) Joshua Dürksen	(Italy) Matteo Nannini	(Paraguay) Joshua Dürksen	(Germany) Mücke Motorsport	Yas Racing Series
2	R4	Yas Marina Circuit, Abu Dhabi (Grand Prix Circuit)	2 February		(Paraguay) Joshua Dürksen	(Italy) Matteo Nannini	(United Arab Emirates) Xcel Motorsport	Yas Racing Series
3	R1	Dubai Autodrome, Dubai (Grand Prix Circuit)	15 February	(Italy) Matteo Nannini	(Oman) Shihab Al Habsi	(Oman) Shihab Al Habsi	(United Arab Emirates) Xcel Motorsport	UAE National Raceday
3	R2	Dubai Autodrome, Dubai (Grand Prix Circuit)	16 February		(Paraguay) Joshua Dürksen	(Paraguay) Joshua Dürksen	(Germany) Mücke Motorsport	UAE National Raceday
3	R3	Dubai Autodrome, Dubai (Grand Prix Circuit)	16 February	(Italy) Matteo Nannini	(Italy) Matteo Nannini	(Italy) Matteo Nannini	(United Arab Emirates) Xcel Motorsport	UAE National Raceday
3	R4	Dubai Autodrome, Dubai (Grand Prix Circuit)	16 February		(Netherlands) Tijmen van der Helm	(Netherlands) Tijmen van der Helm	(United Arab Emirates) Xcel Motorsport	UAE National Raceday
4	R1	Yas Marina Circuit, Abu Dhabi (Grand Prix Circuit)	22 February	(Italy) Matteo Nannini	(Italy) Matteo Nannini	(Italy) Matteo Nannini	(United Arab Emirates) Xcel Motorsport	Yas Racing Series
4	R2	Yas Marina Circuit, Abu Dhabi (Grand Prix Circuit)	23 February		(Monaco) Lucas Alecco Roy	(Monaco) Lucas Alecco Roy	(United Arab Emirates) Dragon Racing	Yas Racing Series
4	R3	Yas Marina Circuit, Abu Dhabi (Grand Prix Circuit)	23 February	(Italy) Matteo Nannini	(Italy) Matteo Nannini	(Monaco) Lucas Alecco Roy	(United Arab Emirates) Dragon Racing	Yas Racing Series
4	R4	Yas Marina Circuit, Abu Dhabi (Grand Prix Circuit)	23 February		(Italy) Matteo Nannini	(Italy) Matteo Nannini	(United Arab Emirates) Xcel Motorsport	Yas Racing Series
5	R1	Dubai Autodrome, Dubai (National Circuit)	1 March	(Oman) Shihab Al Habsi	(Germany) Niklas Krütten	(Oman) Shihab Al Habsi	(United Arab Emirates) Xcel Motorsport	UAE National Raceday
5	R2	Dubai Autodrome, Dubai (National Circuit)	1 March		(Portugal) Rui Andrade	(Germany) Niklas Krütten	(Germany) Mücke Motorsport	UAE National Raceday
5	R3	Dubai Autodrome, Dubai (National Circuit)	2 March	(Oman) Shihab Al Habsi	(Oman) Shihab Al Habsi	(Italy) Matteo Nannini	(United Arab Emirates) Xcel Motorsport	UAE National Raceday
5	R4	Dubai Autodrome, Dubai (National Circuit)	2 March		(Paraguay) Joshua Dürksen	(Paraguay) Joshua Dürksen	(Germany) Mücke Motorsport	UAE National Raceday

== Championship standings ==
Points are awarded to the top 10 classified finishers in each race.

Position	**1st**	**2nd**	**3rd**	**4th**	**5th**	**6th**	**7th**	**8th**	**9th**	**10th**
Points	25	18	15	12	10	8	6	4	2	1

=== Drivers' Championship ===
Pos	Driver	DUB1				YMC1				DUB2				YMC2				DUB3				Pts
Pos	Driver	R1	R2	R3	R4	R1	R2	R3	R4	R1	R2	R3	R4	R1	R2	R3	R4	R1	R2	R3	R4	Pts
1	(Italy) Matteo Nannini	**1**	2	**2**	5	1	3	5	1	**2**	5	**1**	3	**1**	3	**2**	1	2	8	1	3	363
2	(Paraguay) Joshua Dürksen	3	4	3	1	**5**	1	**1**	3	4	1	6	5	5	6	3	4	Ret	3	5	1	295
3	(Oman) Shihab Al Habsi	4	Ret	1	4	10	7	3	2	1	3	2	2	7	9	10	2	**1**	2	**3**	4	269
4	(Monaco) Lucas Alecco Roy	2	1	4	7	2	5	2	4	Ret	7	3	4	2	1	1	9	8	10	6	2	260
5	(Portugal) Rui Andrade	6	3	5	2	3	6	4	5	Ret	6	8	8	3	2	9	3	4	4	8	7	201
6	(United Arab Emirates) Nico Göhler	8	5	6	3	Ret	10	Ret	8	Ret	2	4	10	9	8	5	6	Ret	5	2	8	133
7	(Lebanon) Rashed Ghanem	7	7	8	9	7	9	9	9	Ret	10	7	7	4	4	6	10	3	7	4	9	117
8	(Spain) Rafael Villanueva Jr.	5	Ret	Ret	DNS	8	8	7	6	5	Ret	9	6	10	7	4	5	Ret	9	7	5	103
9	(Poland) Filip Kaminiarz	Ret	6	7	6	4	4	8	7	Ret	9	11	9	6	5	8	8	7	11	9	10	102
10	(Netherlands) Tijmen van der Helm					6	2	6	Ret	3	4	5	1									96
11	(Italy) Nicola Marinangeli	9	8	9	8	9	Ret	10	10	Ret	8	10	Ret	8	DNS	7	7					37
Drivers ineligible to score points
—	(Germany) Niklas Krütten																	5	1	DSQ	DSQ	—
—	(Czech Republic) Roman Staněk																	6	6	Ret	6	—
Pos	Driver	R1	R2	R3	R4	R1	R2	R3	R4	R1	R2	R3	R4	R1	R2	R3	R4	R1	R2	R3	R4	Pts
Pos	Driver	DUB1				YMC1				DUB2				YMC2				DUB3				Pts

Colour	Result
Gold	Winner
Silver	Second place
Bronze	Third place
Green	Points classification
Blue	Non-points classification
Blue	Non-classified finish (NC)
Purple	Retired, not classified (Ret)
Red	Did not qualify (DNQ)
Red	Did not pre-qualify (DNPQ)
Black	Disqualified (DSQ)
White	Did not start (DNS)
White	Withdrew (WD)
White	Race cancelled (C)
Blank	Did not practice (DNP)
Blank	Did not arrive (DNA)
Blank	Excluded (EX)

**Bold** – Pole
Italics – Fastest Lap

=== Teams' championship ===
Ahead of each event, the teams nominate two drivers that accumulate teams' points.

Pos	Team	Points
1	(United Arab Emirates) Xcel Motorsport	632
2	(United Arab Emirates) Dragon Racing	461
3	(Germany) Mücke Motorsport	428
4	(Italy) Cram Motorsport	102
