= Tijmen van der Helm =

Dutch racing driver

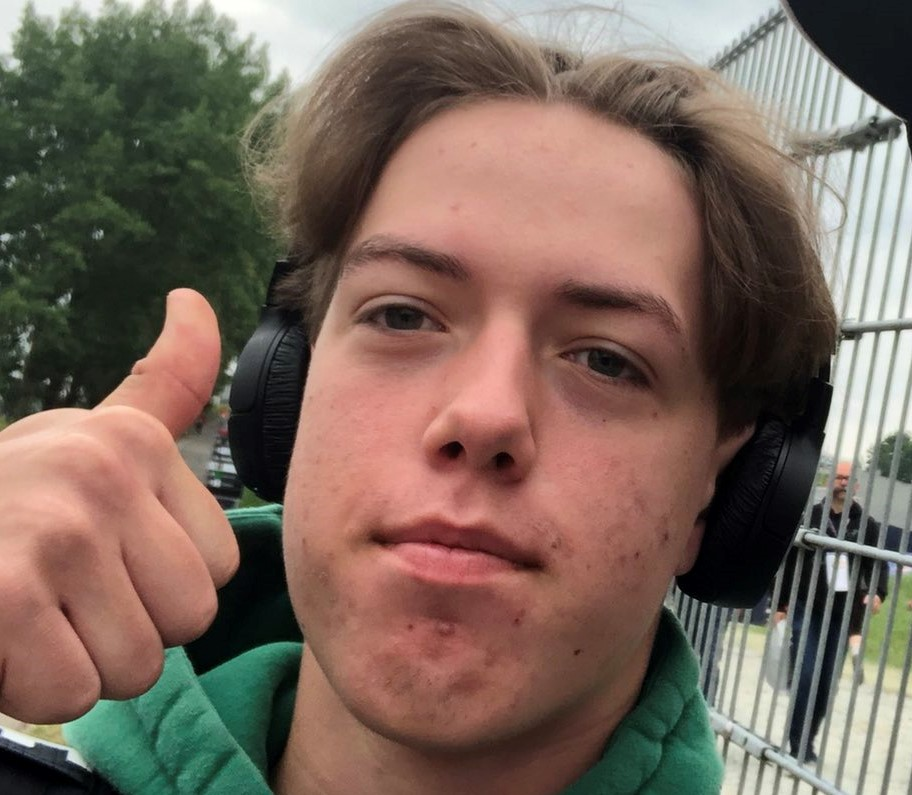
- Van Der Helm during the 2021 Spielberg Formula 3 round.
- Nationality: (Netherlands) Dutch
- Born: 26 January 2004 (age 22) Delft, Netherlands

IMSA SportsCar Championship career
- Debut season: 2023
- Current team: JDC–Miller MotorSports
- Categorisation: FIA Silver (2021–2022); FIA Gold (2023–)
- Car number: 5
- Starts: 36 (36 entries)
- Wins: 1
- Podiums: 5
- Poles: 0
- Fastest laps: 0
- Best finish: 9th in 2023, 2026

Previous series
- 2022–23 2022 2021 2020 2020 2019 2019: European Le Mans Series; FIA WEC; FIA Formula 3 Championship; Formula Renault Eurocup; Toyota Racing Series; F4 Spanish Championship; Formula 4 UAE Championship

Tijmen van der Helm (born 26 January 2004) is a Dutch racing driver currently competing in the IMSA SportsCar Championship with JDC-Miller MotorSports in a Porsche 963.

== Personal life ==
Van der Helm was born on 26 January 2004 in Delft, and grew up in nearby Den Hoorn, South Holland. His career was influenced by his father Gerard, who raced in the Dutch Volkswagen Endurance Cup.

== Early career ==
=== Karting ===
Having started karting in 2013, van der Helm's notable karting successes include third place in the 2013 Chrono Karting Winter Series - Micromax, second in the 2017 CIK-FIA Karting Academy Trophy and a victory in the 2017 Rotax Max Challenge Grand Finals in the junior category.

=== Lower formulae ===
Van der Helm made his single seater debut in the 2019 Formula 4 UAE Championship with Xcel Motorsport. He finished the series tenth in the standings with a win and three podiums to his name. Later that year he raced in the 2019 Spanish F4 Championship with MP Motorsport. He took eight podiums on his way to fourth in the points. In 2020, van der Helm raced in the 2020 Toyota Racing Series. Participating in the championship with Kiwi Motorsport. He finished 14th in the Drivers Championship with a race victory.

=== Formula Renault Eurocup ===
In 2020, van der Helm would race in the Formula Renault Eurocup with FA Racing. He ended the season 12th in the points tally, with one podium finish and 45 points. Van der Helm also beat his experienced teammate Amaury Cordeel by two positions in the championship, and was the sixth-best rookie in the rookie standings. His season was hampered by a wrist injury, one which van der Helm suffered during round 3 at the Nürburgring.

=== FIA Formula 3 ===
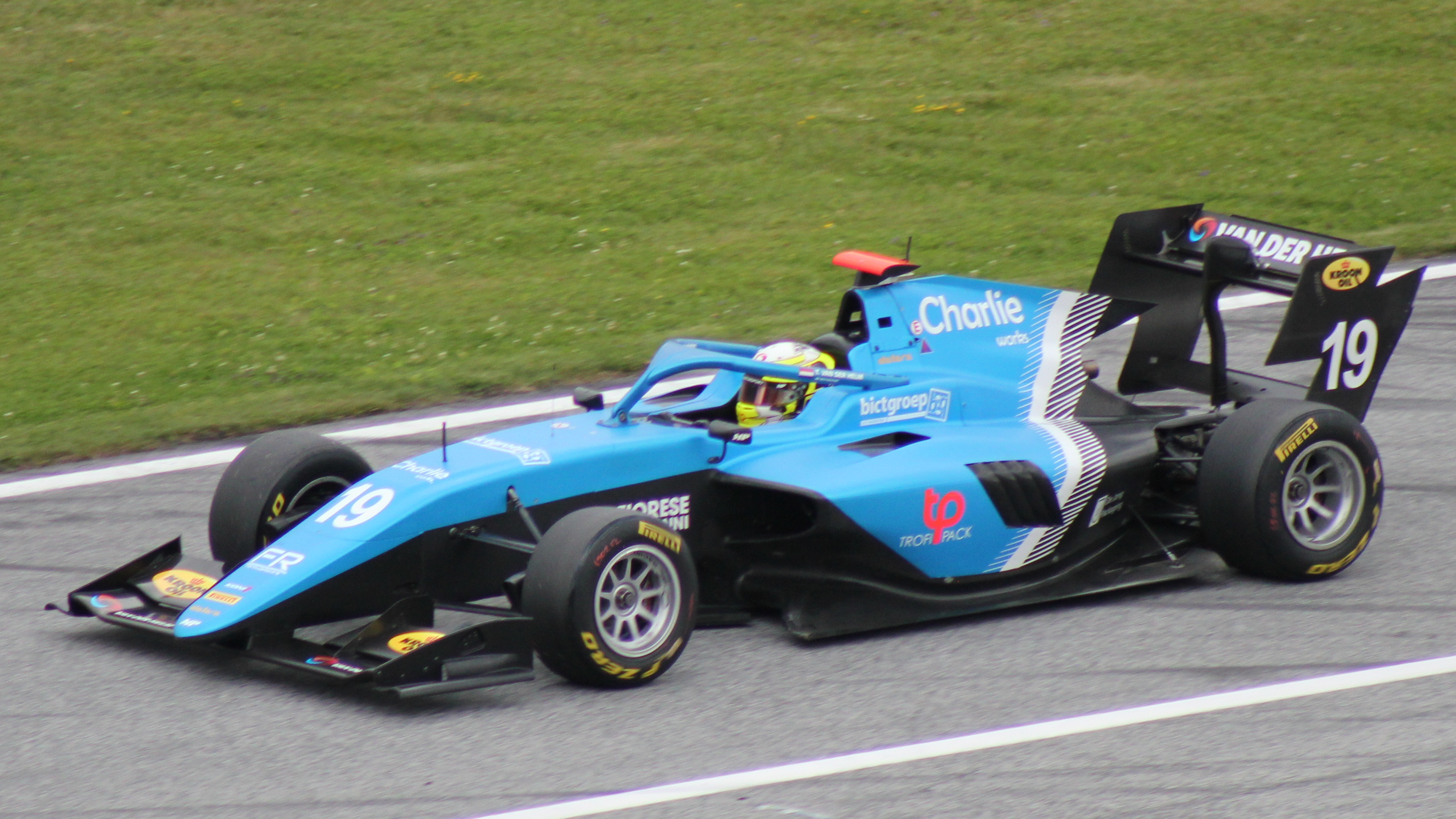
Van Der Helm at the Red Bull Ring in 2021

Heading into 2021, van der Helm moved up to the FIA Formula 3 Championship with MP Motorsport, partnering Alpine juniors and Formula Renault rivals Caio Collet and Victor Martins. During most of the season, he was considerably behind his teammates, scoring no points and only rarely managing to beat Collet and Martins in races.

== Sportscar career ==
=== First steps into endurance racing (2021–22) ===
Van der Helm made his endurance racing debut in 2021, competing in the Road to Le Mans event as part of Racing Spirit of Léman.

After he had started in the 24 Hours of Daytona in January 2022, it was announced that ARC Bratislava team had signed van der Helm for the FIA World Endurance Championship campaign, where he would partner Mathias Beche and Miro Konôpka. He competed for the team in three of the first four rounds, having finished fourth as part of the TDS Racing lineup at the 24 Hours of Le Mans, before ARC Bratislava withdrew from the series, citing logistical reasons.

During the same year, van der Helm also took part in the European Le Mans Series, driving for TDS Racing x Vaillante alongside Beche and Philippe Cimadomo. Having competed in the Pro-Am category given Cimadomo's status as a bronze driver, the team ended up fourth in the class standings, whilst two best race finishes of tenth in the opening pair of races took Van der Helm to 22nd in the overall drivers' championship.

=== ELMS podiums and GTP career (2023–25) ===
Van der Helm started 2023 by stepping down to the LMP3 class, where he finished fifth in the 24 Hours of Daytona for JDC-Miller Motorsports, having experienced a number of technical issues. Shortly afterwards, it was announced that he would partner Job van Uitert and Manuel Maldonado in the European Le Mans Series, returning to the LMP2 class with Panis Racing. The trio finished third of seven teams in the Pro class standings.

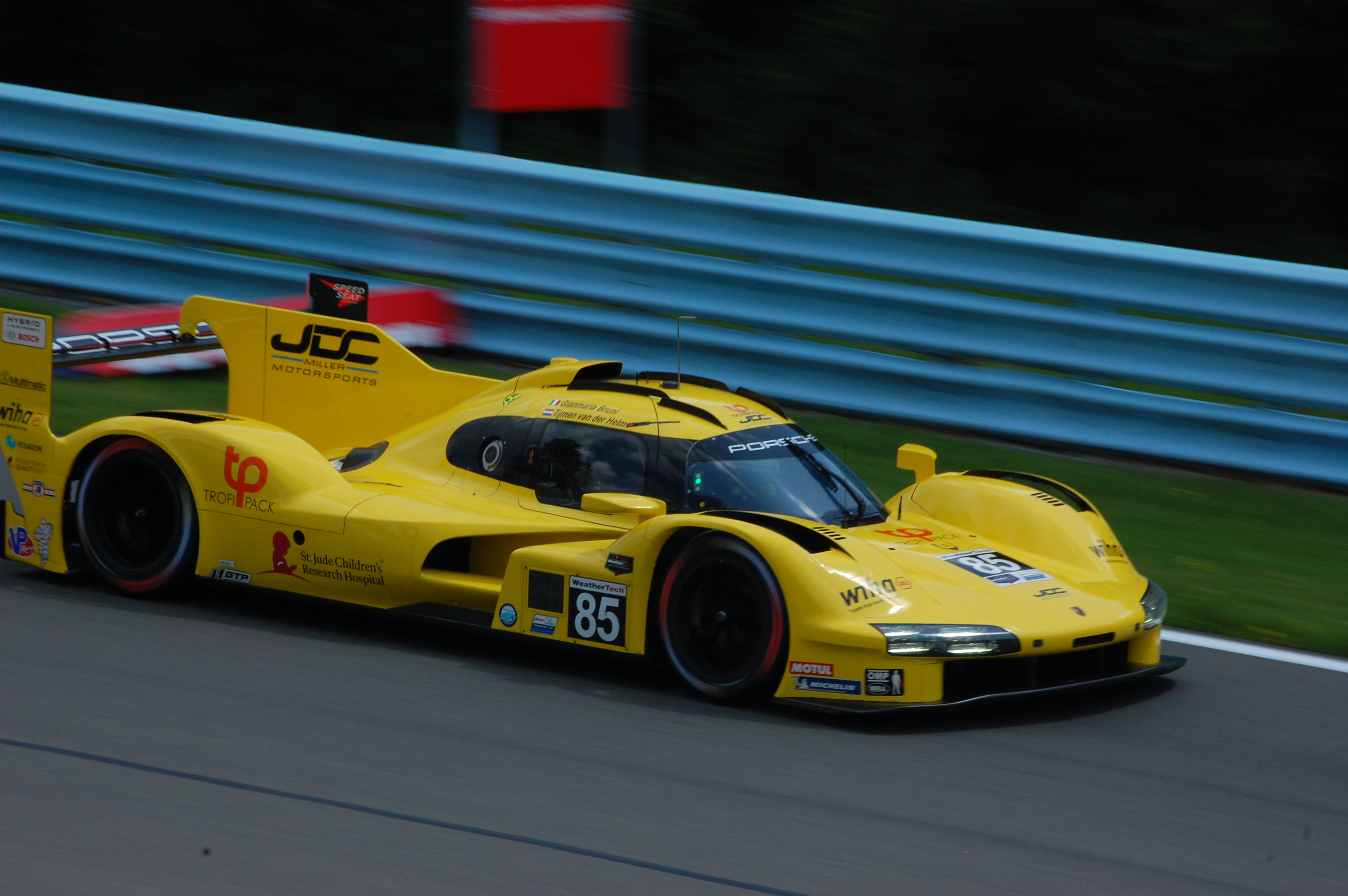
Van Der Helm at Watkins Glen in 2025

Later in 2023, van der Helm was confirmed for JDC-Miller's GTP program, alongside Mike Rockenfeller. The team entered the championship in round 4; with a best race result of fourth, JDC finished ninth in the standings.

For the 2024 season, van der Helm remained at JDC in IMSA, this time partnering Richard Westbrook for the full season and being joined by Phil Hanson in the endurance rounds. The team scored a lone podium at Indianapolis, inheriting third place after two cars were disqualified, and ended up tenth in the standings — last of the full-time competitors.

Ahead of the 2025 IMSA season, van der Helm penned a long-term contract at JDC. With Westbrook's retirement, van der Helm was joined full-time by Gianmaria Bruni. Though the team finished sixth in a tumultuous 24 Hours of Daytona, results were discrete: JDC never finished a race higher than eighth after Daytona, leading to van der Helm finishing 11th in the championship, once again last of the full-time competitors.

=== First GTP victory (2026) ===
Van der Helm returned to JDC in 2026. He, alongside Nico Pino and endurance rookie Kaylen Frederick, finished seventh at Daytona. Heading into round 3 at Long Beach, van der Helm was joined by Porsche factory driver Laurin Heinrich. At round 4 in Laguna Seca, a strong late charge from Heinrich saw the team take victory, JDC's first in the GTP class.

== Karting record ==
=== Karting career summary ===
Season	Series	Team	Position
2012	Dutch 4-Stroke Sprint Championship — Cadet 160		8th
2012	Dutch 4-Stroke Winter Championship — Cadet		8th
2013	Winter Gold Cup — Cadet 160		4th
2013	Chrono Karting Winter Serie — Micromax		3rd
2015	Euro Finale — Mini Max		5th
2016	BNL International Karting Series — Juniors		7th
2017	Rotax Max Wintercup — Rotax Max Junior	JJ Racing	4th
2017	CIK-FIA Karting Academy Trophy	van der Helm, Gerard	2nd
2017	German Karting Championship — Junior		12th
2017	IAME International Final — X30 Junior		6th
2017	WSK Final Cup — OKJ	CRG Keijzer Racing	30th
2017	Rotax Max Challenge Grand Finals — Junior	Gerald van der Helm	1st
2018	WSK Champions Cup — OK	KSM Schumacher Racing Team	27th
2018	South Garda Winter Cup — OK	KSM Schumacher Racing Team	31st
2018	WSK Super Master Series — OK	KSM Schumacher Racing Team	17th
2018	CIK-FIA European Championship — OK	KSM Schumacher Racing Team	25th
2018	German Karting Championship — OK	TB Racing Team	5th
2018	CIK-FIA World Championship — OK	TB Racing Team	10th
2018	WSK Final Cup — OK	TB Racing Team	27th

=== Complete Karting World Championship results ===
Year	Team	Car	Quali Heats	Main race
2018	(Germany) TB Racing Team	OK	5th	10th

== Racing record ==
=== Racing career summary ===
Season	Series	Team	Races	Wins	Poles	F/Laps	Podiums	Points	Position
2019	F4 Spanish Championship	MP Motorsport	21	0	0	0	8	158	4th
2019	Formula 4 UAE Championship	Xcel Motorsport	8	1	0	1	3	96	10th
2019	Formula 4 UAE Championship - Trophy Round	Xcel Motorsport	2	0	0	1	1	N/A	NC
2020	Formula Renault Eurocup	FA Racing	18	0	0	0	0	45	12th
2020	Toyota Racing Series	Kiwi Motorsport	9	1	0	0	1	84	14th
2021	FIA Formula 3 Championship	MP Motorsport	20	0	0	0	0	0	26th
2021	Le Mans Cup - LMP3	Racing Spirit of Léman	2	0	0	0	0	0	NC†
2022	FIA World Endurance Championship - LMP2	ARC Bratislava	3	0	0	0	0	0	24th
2022	IMSA SportsCar Championship - LMP2	G-Drive Racing with APR	1	0	0	0	0	0	NC†
2022	European Le Mans Series - LMP2	TDS Racing x Vaillante	6	0	0	0	0	4	22nd
2022	24 Hours of Le Mans - LMP2	TDS Racing x Vaillante	1	0	0	0	0	N/A	4th
2023	IMSA SportsCar Championship - GTP	JDC-Miller MotorSports	6	0	0	0	0	1660	9th
2023	IMSA SportsCar Championship - LMP3	JDC-Miller MotorSports	2	0	0	0	1	332	26th
2023	European Le Mans Series - LMP2	Panis Racing	6	0	0	0	4	86	**3rd**
2023	24 Hours of Le Mans - LMP2	Panis Racing	1	0	0	0	0	N/A	14th
2024	IMSA SportsCar Championship - GTP	JDC-Miller MotorSports	9	0	0	0	1	2331	10th
2024	International GT Open	Car Collection Motorsport	10	0	0	0	0	0	47th
2025	IMSA SportsCar Championship - GTP	JDC–Miller MotorSports	9	0	0	0	0	2139	11th
2026	IMSA SportsCar Championship - GTP	JDC–Miller MotorSports	9	1	0	1	3	2525	9th
2026	Nürburgring Langstrecken-Serie - VT2-RWD	SRS Team Sorg Rennsport	0	0	0	0	0	0	NC†
2026	Nürburgring Langstrecken-Serie - VT2-FWD+4WD	SRS Team Sorg Rennsport	1	0	0	0	0	0	NC†

^{†} As van der Helm was a guest driver, he was ineligible to score points. ^{*} Season still in progress.

=== Complete Formula 4 UAE Championship results ===
(key) (Races in bold indicate pole position) (Races in italics indicate fastest lap)

Year	Team	1	2	3	4	5	6	7	8	9	10	11	12	13	14	15	16	17	18	19	20	Pos	Points
2019	Xcel Motorsport	DUB1; 1	DUB1; 2	DUB1; 3	DUB1; 4	YMC1; 1; 6	YMC1; 2; 2	YMC1; 3; 6	YMC1; 4 Ret	DUB2; 1; 3	DUB2; 2; 4	DUB2; 3; 5	DUB2; 4; 1	YMC2; 1	YMC2; 2	YMC2; 3	YMC2; 4	DUB3; 1	DUB3; 2	DUB3; 3	DUB3; 4	10th	96

=== Complete F4 Spanish Championship results ===
(key) (Races in bold indicate pole position) (Races in italics indicate fastest lap)

Year	Team	1	2	3	4	5	6	7	8	9	10	11	12	13	14	15	16	17	18	19	20	21	Pos	Points
2019	MP Motorsport	NAV; 1; 7	NAV; 2; 8	NAV; 3; 2	LEC; 1; 13	LEC; 2; 17	LEC; 3; 14	ARA; 1; 7	ARA; 2; 2	ARA; 3; 13	CRT; 1; 4	CRT; 2; 3	CRT; 3; 4	JER; 1; 2	JER; 2; 4	JER; 3; 7	ALG; 1; 10	ALG; 2; 3	ALG; 3; 4	CAT; 1; 17	CAT; 2; 3	CAT; 3; 4	4th	158

=== Complete Toyota Racing Series results ===
(key) (Races in bold indicate pole position) (Races in italics indicate fastest lap)

Year	Team	1	2	3	4	5	6	7	8	9	10	11	12	13	14	15	DC	Points
2020	Kiwi Motorsport	HIG; 1	HIG; 2	HIG; 3	TER; 1	TER; 2	TER; 3	HMP; 1; 17	HMP; 2; 17	HMP; 3; 11	PUK; 1; 11	PUK; 2; 10	PUK; 3; 9	MAN; 1; 6	MAN; 2; 1	MAN; 3 Ret	14th	84

=== Complete Formula Renault Eurocup results ===
(key) (Races in bold indicate pole position) (Races in italics indicate fastest lap)

Year	Team	1	2	3	4	5	6	7	8	9	10	11	12	13	14	15	16	17	18	19	20	DC	Points
2020	FA Racing	MNZ; 1; 4	MNZ; 2; 9	IMO; 1; 12	IMO; 2; 9	NÜR; 1; 10	NÜR; 2; 13	MAG; 1 DNS	MAG; 2 DNS	ZAN; 1; 13	ZAN; 2; 7	CAT; 1; 10	CAT; 2; 7	SPA; 1; 12	SPA; 2; 7	IMO; 1; 12	IMO; 2; 14	HOC; 1; 8	HOC; 2; 13	LEC; 1; 16	LEC; 2; 14	12th	45

=== Complete FIA Formula 3 Championship results ===
(key) (Races in bold indicate pole position; races in italics indicate points for the fastest lap of top ten finishers)

Year	Entrant	1	2	3	4	5	6	7	8	9	10	11	12	13	14	15	16	17	18	19	20	21	DC	Points
2021	MP Motorsport	CAT; 1; 21	CAT; 2; 15	CAT; 3; 20	LEC; 1; 29	LEC; 2; 18	LEC; 3; 16	RBR; 1; 13	RBR; 2 Ret	RBR; 3; 20	HUN; 1; 21	HUN; 2; 15	HUN; 3; 19	SPA; 1; 23	SPA; 2; 16	SPA; 3; 22	ZAN; 1; 21	ZAN; 2; 21	ZAN; 3; 29†	SOC; 1 Ret	SOC; 2 C	SOC; 3; 18	26th	0

^{†} Driver did not finish the race, but was classified as they completed more than 90% of the race distance.

=== Complete IMSA SportsCar Championship results ===
(key) (Races in bold indicate pole position; races in italics indicate fastest lap)

Year	Entrant	Class	Chassis	Engine	1	2	3	4	5	6	7	8	9	Rank	Points
2022	G-Drive Racing by APR	LMP2	Oreca 07	Gibson GK428 V8	DAY; 8†	SEB	LGA	MDO	WGL	ELK	PET			NC†	0†
2023	JDC-Miller MotorSports	LMP3	Duqueine M30 - D08	Nissan VK56DE 5.6 L V8	DAY; 5	SEB; 3								26th	332
2023	JDC-Miller MotorSports	GTP	Porsche 963	Porsche 9RD 4.6 L Turbo V8			LBH	LGA; 7	WGL; 4	MOS; 4	ELK; 5	IMS; 8	PET; 5	9th	1660
2024	JDC-Miller MotorSports	GTP	Porsche 963	Porsche 9RD 4.6 L Turbo V8	DAY; 6	SEB; 11	LBH; 7	LGA; 8	DET; 8	WGL; 9	ELK; 6	IMS; 3	PET; 11	10th	2331
2025	JDC–Miller MotorSports	GTP	Porsche 963	Porsche 9RD 4.6 L Turbo V8	DAY; 6	SEB; 8	LBH; 10	LGA; 9	DET; 11	WGL; 10	ELK; 10	IMS; 8	PET; 12	11th	2139
2026	JDC–Miller MotorSports	GTP	Porsche 963	Porsche 9RD 4.6 L Turbo V8	DAY; 7	SEB; 8	LBH; 6	LGA; 1	DET; 11	WGL; 3	ELK; 2	IMS; 9	PET; 9	9th	2525

^{†} Points only counted towards the Michelin Endurance Cup, and not the overall LMP2 Championship.

=== Complete FIA World Endurance Championship results ===
(key) (Races in bold indicate pole position) (Races in italics indicate fastest lap)

Year	Entrant	Class	Chassis	Engine	1	2	3	4	5	6	Rank	Points
2022	ARC Bratislava	LMP2	Oreca 07	Gibson GK428 4.2 L V8	SEB; 13	SPA; Ret		MNZ; 11	FUJ	BHR	24th	0
2022	TDS Racing x Vaillante	LMP2	Oreca 07	Gibson GK428 4.2 L V8			LMS; 4†				24th	0

^{†} Non World Endurance Championship entries are ineligible to score points.

=== Complete European Le Mans Series results ===
(key) (Races in bold indicate pole position; results in italics indicate fastest lap)

Year	Entrant	Class	Chassis	Engine	1	2	3	4	5	6	Rank	Points
2022	TDS Racing x Vaillante	LMP2	Oreca 07	Gibson GK428 V8	LEC; 10	IMO; 10	MNZ; 13	CAT; 11	SPA; 12	ALG; 11	22nd	4
2022	TDS Racing x Vaillante	Pro-Am Cup	Oreca 07	Gibson GK428 V8	3	2	5	5	5	4	5th	76
2023	Panis Racing	LMP2	Oreca 07	Gibson GK428 4.2 L V8	CAT; 2	LEC; 6	ARA; 4	SPA; 2	POR; 3	ALG; 3	3rd	86

=== Complete 24 Hours of Le Mans results ===
Year	Team	Co-Drivers	Car	Class	Laps	Pos.	Class Pos.
2022	(France) TDS Racing x Vaillante	(Switzerland) Mathias Beche (Netherlands) Nyck de Vries	Oreca 07-Gibson	LMP2	368	8th	4th
2023	(France) Panis Racing	(Venezuela) Manuel Maldonado (Netherlands) Job van Uitert	Oreca 07-Gibson	LMP2	316	25th	14th
