= 2017–18 Formula 4 UAE Championship =

Motor racing competition

The 2017–18 Formula 4 UAE Championship was the second season of the Formula 4 UAE Championship, a motor racing series for the United Arab Emirates regulated according to FIA Formula 4 regulations, and organised and promoted by the Automobile & Touring Club of the UAE (ATCUAE) and AUH Motorsports.

It began on 14 December 2017 at the Yas Marina Circuit and finished on 3 March 2018 at the Dubai Autodrome, after 24 championship races held across six quadruple-header rounds.

== Teams and drivers ==
Team	No.	Driver	Rounds
(United Arab Emirates) Dream Racing	3	(United Kingdom) Ollie Smith	1
(United Arab Emirates) Dream Racing	92	(United Kingdom) Logan Hannah	1
(United Arab Emirates) Silberpfeil Energy Dubai	3	(Morocco) Sami Taoufik	3–4
(United Arab Emirates) Silberpfeil Energy Dubai	15	(Italy) Marzio Moretti	3
(United Arab Emirates) Silberpfeil Energy Dubai	21	(Finland) Patrik Pasma	2
(United Arab Emirates) Silberpfeil Energy Dubai	22	(Sweden) Lucas Petersson	All
(United Arab Emirates) Silberpfeil Energy Dubai	23	(Brazil) Caio Collet	3–4
(United Arab Emirates) Silberpfeil Energy Dubai	23	(United Kingdom) Jake Dalton	6
(United Arab Emirates) Silberpfeil Energy Dubai	64	(United Kingdom) Olli Caldwell	1–2
(Germany) Mücke Motorsport	5	(Germany) Niklas Krütten	4–5
(Germany) Mücke Motorsport	6	(Finland) William Alatalo	4–5
(United Arab Emirates) Dragon Motopark F4	8	(Germany) Lucas Alecco Roy	All
(United Arab Emirates) Dragon Motopark F4	88	(Belgium) Charles Weerts	All
(United Arab Emirates) Dragon Motopark F4	888	(Belgium) Amaury Cordeel	2–6
(United Arab Emirates) Rasgaira Motorsports (Note: The cars were prepared in conjunction with US Racing.)	9	(Czech Republic) Petr Ptáček	1–2, 4
(United Arab Emirates) Rasgaira Motorsports	27	(Germany) David Schumacher	2–6
(United Arab Emirates) Rasgaira Motorsports	77	(Germany) Leon Köhler	3
(United Arab Emirates) Rasgaira Motorsports	95	(Czech Republic) Tom Beckhäuser	5
(Italy) Cram Motorsport / Charouz Racing	95	(Czech Republic) Tom Beckhäuser	1–4, 6
(Portugal) DR Formula	42	(Italy) Edoardo Morricone	2, 6
(Portugal) DR Formula	55	(Hungary) László Tóth	4
(San Marino) GDL Racing	57	(Russia) Mikhail Spiridonov	1–4

== Race calendar and results ==
The calendar was announced on 5 September 2017. The season featured six quadruple-header rounds, all of them held at the Yas Marina Circuit in Abu Dhabi and the Dubai Autodrome in the United Arab Emirates. As opposed to the previous season, all rounds awarded points for the championship, the "Trophy Event" non-championship round not being held anymore.

Round		Circuit	Date	Pole position	Fastest lap	Winning driver	Winning team	Supporting
2017
1	R1	Yas Marina Circuit, Abu Dhabi (Grand Prix layout)	14 December	(Belgium) Charles Weerts	(Belgium) Charles Weerts	(Belgium) Charles Weerts	(United Arab Emirates) Dragon Motopark F4	Gulf 12 Hours; MRF Challenge Formula 2000
1	R2	Yas Marina Circuit, Abu Dhabi (Grand Prix layout)	15 December		(Sweden) Lucas Petersson	(Sweden) Lucas Petersson	(United Arab Emirates) Silberpfeil Energy Dubai	Gulf 12 Hours; MRF Challenge Formula 2000
1	R3	Yas Marina Circuit, Abu Dhabi (Grand Prix layout)	15 December	(Czech Republic) Tom Beckhäuser	(Sweden) Lucas Petersson	(United Kingdom) Olli Caldwell	(United Arab Emirates) Silberpfeil Energy Dubai	Gulf 12 Hours; MRF Challenge Formula 2000
1	R4	Yas Marina Circuit, Abu Dhabi (Grand Prix layout)	15 December		(Belgium) Charles Weerts	(Czech Republic) Tom Beckhäuser	(Italy) Cram Motorsport	Gulf 12 Hours; MRF Challenge Formula 2000
2018
2	R1	Yas Marina Circuit, Abu Dhabi (North layout)	19 January	(Germany) David Schumacher	(Sweden) Lucas Petersson	(United Kingdom) Olli Caldwell	(United Arab Emirates) Silberpfeil Energy Dubai	Yas Superstreet Challenge
2	R2	Yas Marina Circuit, Abu Dhabi (North layout)	20 January		(United Kingdom) Olli Caldwell	(United Kingdom) Olli Caldwell	(United Arab Emirates) Silberpfeil Energy Dubai	Yas Superstreet Challenge
2	R3	Yas Marina Circuit, Abu Dhabi (North layout)	20 January	(United Kingdom) Olli Caldwell	(Germany) David Schumacher	(Belgium) Charles Weerts	(United Arab Emirates) Dragon Motopark F4	Yas Superstreet Challenge
2	R4	Yas Marina Circuit, Abu Dhabi (North layout)	20 January		(Belgium) Charles Weerts	(Sweden) Lucas Petersson	(United Arab Emirates) Silberpfeil Energy Dubai	Yas Superstreet Challenge
3	R1	Dubai Autodrome, Dubai (International layout)	26 January	(Germany) David Schumacher	(Belgium) Charles Weerts	(Germany) Leon Köhler	(United Arab Emirates) Rasgaira Motorsports	National Race Day
3	R2	Dubai Autodrome, Dubai (International layout)	27 January		(Brazil) Caio Collet	(Germany) David Schumacher	(United Arab Emirates) Rasgaira Motorsports	National Race Day
3	R3	Dubai Autodrome, Dubai (International layout)	27 January	(Germany) David Schumacher	(Germany) David Schumacher	(Germany) Leon Köhler	(United Arab Emirates) Rasgaira Motorsports	National Race Day
3	R4	Dubai Autodrome, Dubai (International layout)	27 January	Race cancelled				National Race Day
4	R1	Yas Marina Circuit, Abu Dhabi (Grand Prix layout)	2 February	(Brazil) Caio Collet	(Belgium) Charles Weerts	(Belgium) Charles Weerts	(United Arab Emirates) Dragon Motopark F4	Yas Racing Series
4	R2	Yas Marina Circuit, Abu Dhabi (Grand Prix layout)	3 February		(Morocco) Sami Taoufik	(Germany) David Schumacher	(United Arab Emirates) Rasgaira Motorsports	Yas Racing Series
4	R3	Yas Marina Circuit, Abu Dhabi (Grand Prix layout)	3 February	(Brazil) Caio Collet	(Brazil) Caio Collet	(Brazil) Caio Collet	(United Arab Emirates) Silberpfeil Energy Dubai	Yas Racing Series
4	R4	Yas Marina Circuit, Abu Dhabi (Grand Prix layout)	3 February		(Brazil) Caio Collet	(Germany) David Schumacher	(United Arab Emirates) Rasgaira Motorsports	Yas Racing Series
5	R1	Yas Marina Circuit, Abu Dhabi (Grand Prix layout)	23 February	(Germany) David Schumacher	(Belgium) Charles Weerts	(Belgium) Charles Weerts	(United Arab Emirates) Dragon Motopark F4	Yas Racing Series; Yas Superstreet Challenge
5	R2	Yas Marina Circuit, Abu Dhabi (Grand Prix layout)	24 February		(Belgium) Amaury Cordeel	(Belgium) Amaury Cordeel	(United Arab Emirates) Dragon Motopark F4	Yas Racing Series; Yas Superstreet Challenge
5	R3	Yas Marina Circuit, Abu Dhabi (Grand Prix layout)	24 February	(Germany) David Schumacher	(Germany) David Schumacher	(Finland) William Alatalo	(Germany) BWT Mücke Motorsport	Yas Racing Series; Yas Superstreet Challenge
5	R4	Yas Marina Circuit, Abu Dhabi (Grand Prix layout)	24 February		(Germany) Niklas Krütten	(Finland) William Alatalo	(Germany) BWT Mücke Motorsport	Yas Racing Series; Yas Superstreet Challenge
6	R1	Dubai Autodrome, Dubai (Grand Prix layout)	2 March	(Belgium) Charles Weerts	(Belgium) Charles Weerts	(Belgium) Charles Weerts	(United Arab Emirates) Dragon Motopark F4	National Race Day
6	R2	Dubai Autodrome, Dubai (Grand Prix layout)	3 March		(Belgium) Charles Weerts	(Belgium) Charles Weerts	(United Arab Emirates) Dragon Motopark F4	National Race Day
6	R3	Dubai Autodrome, Dubai (Grand Prix layout)	3 March	(Belgium) Charles Weerts	(Germany) David Schumacher	(Belgium) Charles Weerts	(United Arab Emirates) Dragon Motopark F4	National Race Day
6	R4	Dubai Autodrome, Dubai (Grand Prix layout)	3 March		(Belgium) Charles Weerts	(Belgium) Charles Weerts	(United Arab Emirates) Dragon Motopark F4	National Race Day

== Championship standings ==
Points were awarded to the top 10 classified finishers in each race.

Position	**1st**	**2nd**	**3rd**	**4th**	**5th**	**6th**	**7th**	**8th**	**9th**	**10th**
Points	25	18	15	12	10	8	6	4	2	1

=== Drivers' Championship ===
Pos	Driver	YMC1				YMC2				DUB1				YMC3				YMC4				DUB2				Pts
Pos	Driver	R1	R2	R3	R4	R1	R2	R3	R4	R1	R2	R3	R4	R1	R2	R3	R4	R1	R2	R3	R4	R1	R2	R3	R4	Pts
1	(Belgium) Charles Weerts	**1**	6	2	2	2	3	1	3	Ret	5	7	C	1	3	Ret	4	1	3	3	4	**1**	1	**1**	1	377
2	(Germany) David Schumacher					**3**	2	2	2	**2**	1	**6**	C	3	1	5	1	**2**	2	**2**	3	2	6	2	3	325
3	(Czech Republic) Tom Beckhäuser	2	5	**5**	1	5	4	3	5	4	3	2	C	5	8	7	9	5	6	5	DNS	3	2	5	4	262
4	(Sweden) Lucas Petersson	3	1	3	4	6	5	5	1	6	Ret	5	C	7	4	6	12	7	4	6	6	5	3	6	NC	233
5	(Germany) Lucas Alecco Roy	Ret	4	6	5	Ret	7	6	4	7	Ret	Ret	C	6	6	8	10	6	5	8	7	8	4	Ret	Ret	131
6	(Brazil) Caio Collet									3	2	4	C	**2**	2	**1**	2									124
7	(United Kingdom) Olli Caldwell	4	2	1	8	1	1	**8**	8																	123
8	(Belgium) Amaury Cordeel					Ret	6	Ret	DNS	DSQ	4	3	C	10	7	Ret	5	3	1	7	5	4	DNS	Ret	DNS	120
9	(Finland) William Alatalo													11	6	3	3	4	8	1	1					104
10	(Czech Republic) Petr Ptáček	6	3	4	3	7	9	DNS						9	Ret	Ret	6									80
11	(Germany) Niklas Krütten													8	11	4	7	8	7	4	2					64
12	(Germany) Leon Köhler									1	6	1	C													58
13	(Morocco) Sami Taoufik									5	7	Ret	C	4	12	2	8									51
14	(United Kingdom) Jake Dalton																					6	Ret	3	2	41
15	(Finland) Patrik Pasma					4	Ret	4	6																	32
16	(United Kingdom) Logan Hannah	8	7	Ret	7																					22
17	(Italy) Marzio Moretti									8	Ret	8	C													8
Drivers ineligible to score points
	(United Kingdom) Ollie Smith	5	DNP																							
	(Russia) Mikhail Spiridonov	7	8	7	6	WD				WD			C	13	10	10	Ret									
	(Italy) Edoardo Morricone					8	8	7	7													7	5	4	5	
	(Hungary) László Tóth													12	9	9	11									
Pos	Driver	R1	R2	R3	R4	R1	R2	R3	R4	R1	R2	R3	R4	R1	R2	R3	R4	R1	R2	R3	R4	R1	R2	R3	R4	Pts
Pos	Driver	YMC1				YMC2				DUB1				YMC3				YMC4				DUB2				Pts

Colour	Result
Gold	Winner
Silver	Second place
Bronze	Third place
Green	Points classification
Blue	Non-points classification
Blue	Non-classified finish (NC)
Purple	Retired, not classified (Ret)
Red	Did not qualify (DNQ)
Red	Did not pre-qualify (DNPQ)
Black	Disqualified (DSQ)
White	Did not start (DNS)
White	Withdrew (WD)
White	Race cancelled (C)
Blank	Did not practice (DNP)
Blank	Did not arrive (DNA)
Blank	Excluded (EX)

**Bold** – Pole
Italics – Fastest Lap

=== Teams' championship ===
Pos	Team	Points
1	(United Arab Emirates) Dragon Motopark F4	580
2	(United Arab Emirates) Silberpfeil Energy Dubai	561
3	(United Arab Emirates) Rasgaira Motorsports	540
4	(Italy) Cram Motorsport / Charouz Racing	177
5	(Germany) Mücke Motorsport	168
6	(United Arab Emirates) Dream Racing	22
