= 2024 IMSA Battle on the Bricks =

Tenth round of the 2024 IMSA SportsCar Championship season

The layout of Indianapolis Motor Speedway, where the race was held.

The 2024 IMSA Battle on the Bricks (officially known as the 2024 Tirerack.com Battle on the Bricks) was a sports car race held at Indianapolis Motor Speedway in Speedway, Indiana, on September 22, 2024. It was the tenth round of the 2024 IMSA SportsCar Championship, as well as the fourth round of the Michelin Endurance Cup.

Philipp Eng and Jesse Krohn secured BMW's and Team RLL's first win in IMSA's SportsCar Championship since the 2023 Sahlen's Six Hours of The Glen after holding off late charges from the No. 6 Porsche Penske Motorsport car. It was Team RLL's first win with the BMW M Hybrid V8 where it actually took the chequered flag first. Connor De Phillippi and Nick Yelloly, driving the other RLL-fielded BMW, finished second, resulting in a first 1–2 finish for the M Hybrid V8 prototype. Mathieu Jaminet and Nick Tandy originally finished in third place, but were later stripped from their podium place as their car made use of non-homologated parts. Phil Hanson, Tijmen van der Helm, and Richard Westbrook inherited third place.

== Background ==
=== Preview ===
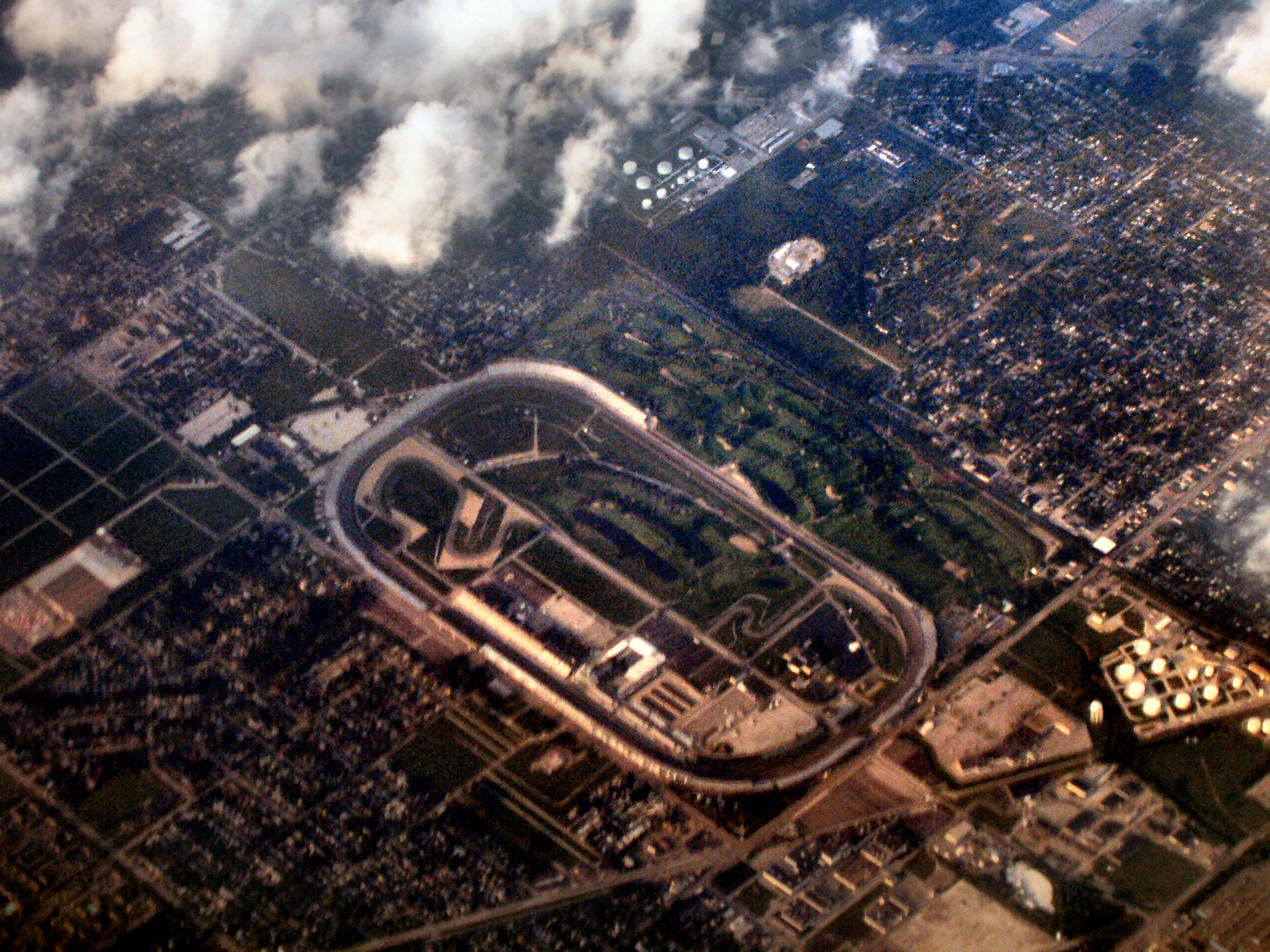
Indianapolis Motor Speedway, where the race was held.

International Motor Sports Association (IMSA) president John Doonan confirmed the race was part of the 2024 IMSA SportsCar Championship (IMSA SCC) in August 2023. It was the second consecutive year the IMSA SCC hosted a race at Indianapolis Motor Speedway, and the third time a race was held here since the series' inception in 2014. The 2024 IMSA Battle on the Bricks was the tenth of eleven scheduled sports car races of 2024 by IMSA. The race was held at the fourteen-turn 2.439 mi (3.925 km) Indianapolis Motor Speedway road course on September 22, 2024.

=== Balance of performance ===
Ahead of the event, IMSA published a bulletin regarding the latest balance of performance (BoP) changes in the GTP, GTD Pro, and GTD classes. In the GTP class, the Porsche received a 3 kilogram weight increase, whilst also receiving an increase of 6 kilowatts in power. The BMW was up 2 kilograms from Road America, with a power increase of 7 kilowatts. The Acura received 1 kilogram of additional ballast, whilst remaining at the highest possible power level of 520 kilowatts. The Cadillac only saw a power increase of 5 kilowatts. Finally, the Lamborghini, which returned for the first time since Watkins Glen, had the minimum weight of 1030 kilograms, with a power output of 518 kilowatts. In the GTD Pro and GTD classes, the BMW received a 6.7 horsepower reduction, whilst the Ford lost 8.8 horsepower with a 1 millimeter smaller air restrictor. Furthermore, the Acura received a loss in power of 11.4 horsepower. Finally, the Mercedes saw a power boost of 6.7 horsepower, whilst the air restrictor will be opened up by 0.5 millimeters.

=== Standings before the race ===
Preceding the event, Dane Cameron and Felipe Nasr led the GTP Drivers' Championship with 2386 points, 100 ahead of Porsche teammates Mathieu Jaminet and Nick Tandy. Sebastien Bourdais and Renger van der Zande sat in third, 185 points behind Cameron and Nasr. The LMP2 Drivers' Championship was led by Nick Boulle and Tom Dillmann with 1564 points, 27 points ahead of second-placed Felipe Fraga and Gar Robinson. Ryan Dalziel sat in third, a further 64 points behind. The GTD Pro Drivers' Championship saw Laurin Heinrich leading with 2519 points, only 17 ahead of second-placed Ross Gunn. Bryan Sellers and Madison Snow sat in third, 111 points behind Heinrich. In GTD, Philip Ellis and Russell Ward led the Drivers' Championship with 2718 points, 284 points ahead of second-placed Robby Foley and Patrick Gallagher. Mikaël Grenier sat in third place, a further 256 points behind. The Teams' Championships were led by Porsche Penske Motorsport, Inter Europol by PR1/Mathiasen Motorsports, AO Racing, and Winward Racing, respectively, whilst the Manufacturers' Championships were led by Porsche in GTP and GTD Pro, and Mercedes-AMG in GTD.

== Entry list ==
The entry list was revealed on September 11, 2024, and featured 56 entries: 11 entries in GTP, 10 in LMP2, 12 in GTD Pro, and 23 entries in GTD. On September 18, 2024, Heart of Racing Team announced that they would move the No. 27 entry up to GTD Pro to assist Ross Gunn in the GTD Pro Drivers' Championship battle.

No.	Entrant	Car	Driver 1	Driver 2	Driver 3
Grand Touring Prototype (GTP) (11 entries)
01	(United States) Cadillac Racing	Cadillac V-Series.R	(France) Sébastien Bourdais	(Netherlands) Renger van der Zande	
5	(Germany) Proton Competition Mustang Sampling	Porsche 963	(Italy) Gianmaria Bruni	(Belgium) Alessio Picariello	(Netherlands) Bent Viscaal
6	(Germany) Porsche Penske Motorsport	Porsche 963	(France) Mathieu Jaminet	(United Kingdom) Nick Tandy	
7	(Germany) Porsche Penske Motorsport	Porsche 963	(United States) Dane Cameron	(Brazil) Felipe Nasr	
10	(United States) Wayne Taylor Racing with Andretti	Acura ARX-06	(Portugal) Filipe Albuquerque	(United States) Ricky Taylor	
24	(United States) BMW M Team RLL	BMW M Hybrid V8	(Austria) Philipp Eng	(Finland) Jesse Krohn	
25	(United States) BMW M Team RLL	BMW M Hybrid V8	(United States) Connor De Phillippi	(United Kingdom) Nick Yelloly	
31	(United States) Whelen Cadillac Racing	Cadillac V-Series.R	(United Kingdom) Jack Aitken	(United Kingdom) Tom Blomqvist	(Brazil) Pipo Derani
40	(United States) Wayne Taylor Racing with Andretti	Acura ARX-06	(Switzerland) Louis Delétraz	(United States) Jordan Taylor	
63	(Italy) Lamborghini – Iron Lynx	Lamborghini SC63	(Italy) Matteo Cairoli	(Italy) Andrea Caldarelli	(France) Romain Grosjean
85	(United States) JDC–Miller MotorSports	Porsche 963	(United Kingdom) Phil Hanson	(Netherlands) Tijmen van der Helm	(United Kingdom) Richard Westbrook
Le Mans Prototype 2 (LMP2) (10 entries)
2	(United States) United Autosports USA	Oreca 07-Gibson	(United Kingdom) Ben Hanley	(United States) Ben Keating	(Chile) Nico Pino
8	(United States) Tower Motorsports	Oreca 07-Gibson	(United States) Michael Dinan	(Republic of Ireland) Charlie Eastwood	(Canada) John Farano
11	(France) TDS Racing	Oreca 07-Gibson	(Denmark) Mikkel Jensen	(New Zealand) Hunter McElrea	(United States) Steven Thomas
18	(United States) Era Motorsport	Oreca 07-Gibson	(United Kingdom) Ryan Dalziel	(United States) Dwight Merriman	(United States) Connor Zilisch
20	(Denmark) MDK by High Class Racing	Oreca 07-Gibson	(Denmark) Dennis Andersen	(United States) Scott Huffaker	(United States) Seth Lucas
22	(United States) United Autosports USA	Oreca 07-Gibson	(United States) Bijoy Garg	(United States) Dan Goldburg	(United Kingdom) Paul di Resta
52	(Poland) Inter Europol by PR1/Mathiasen Motorsports	Oreca 07-Gibson	(United States) Nick Boulle	(France) Tom Dillmann	(Poland) Jakub Śmiechowski
74	(United States) Riley	Oreca 07-Gibson	(Australia) Josh Burdon	(Brazil) Felipe Fraga	(United States) Gar Robinson
88	(Italy) Richard Mille AF Corse	Oreca 07-Gibson	(Argentina) Luis Pérez Companc	(United States) Dylan Murry	(Denmark) Nicklas Nielsen
99	(United States) AO Racing	Oreca 07-Gibson	(Australia) Matthew Brabham	(France) Paul-Loup Chatin	(United States) P. J. Hyett
GT Daytona Pro (GTD Pro) (13 entries)
027	(United States) Heart of Racing Team	Aston Martin Vantage AMR GT3 Evo	(Canada) Roman De Angelis	(Germany) Mario Farnbacher	
1	(United States) Paul Miller Racing	BMW M4 GT3	(United States) Bryan Sellers	(United States) Madison Snow	(United States) Neil Verhagen
3	(United States) Corvette Racing by Pratt Miller Motorsports	Chevrolet Corvette Z06 GT3.R	(Spain) Antonio García	(United Kingdom) Alexander Sims	
4	(United States) Corvette Racing by Pratt Miller Motorsports	Chevrolet Corvette Z06 GT3.R	(Netherlands) Nicky Catsburg	(United States) Tommy Milner	
9	(Canada) Pfaff Motorsports	McLaren 720S GT3 Evo	(United Kingdom) Oliver Jarvis	(Germany) Marvin Kirchhöfer	
14	(United States) Vasser Sullivan	Lexus RC F GT3	(United Kingdom) Ben Barnicoat	(United Kingdom) Jack Hawksworth	
19	(Italy) Iron Lynx	Lamborghini Huracán GT3 Evo 2	(Germany) Luca Engstler	(Germany) Maximilian Paul	
23	(United States) Heart of Racing Team	Aston Martin Vantage AMR GT3 Evo	(United Kingdom) Ross Gunn	(Spain) Alex Riberas	
62	(United States) Risi Competizione	Ferrari 296 GT3	(Italy) Davide Rigon	(Brazil) Daniel Serra	
64	(Canada) Ford Multimatic Motorsports	Ford Mustang GT3	(Germany) Mike Rockenfeller	(United Kingdom) Harry Tincknell	
65	(Canada) Ford Multimatic Motorsports	Ford Mustang GT3	(United States) Joey Hand	(Germany) Dirk Müller	
75	(Australia) SunEnergy1 Racing	Mercedes-AMG GT3 Evo	(Australia) Kenny Habul	(Australia) Jordan Love	(Australia) Chaz Mostert
77	(United States) AO Racing	Porsche 911 GT3 R (992)	(Germany) Laurin Heinrich	(Denmark) Michael Christensen	
GT Daytona (GTD) (22 entries)
023	(United States) Triarsi Competizione	Ferrari 296 GT3	(Italy) Riccardo Agostini	(United States) Charlie Scardina	(United States) Onofrio Triarsi
12	(United States) Vasser Sullivan	Lexus RC F GT3	(United States) Frankie Montecalvo	(United States) Aaron Telitz	(Canada) Parker Thompson
13	(Canada) AWA	Chevrolet Corvette Z06 GT3.R	(United Kingdom) Matt Bell	(Canada) Orey Fidani	(Germany) Lars Kern
21	(Italy) AF Corse	Ferrari 296 GT3	(France) François Heriau	(United Kingdom) Simon Mann	(Spain) Miguel Molina
32	(United States) Korthoff/Preston Motorsports	Mercedes-AMG GT3 Evo	(Canada) Mikaël Grenier	(United States) Kenton Koch	(United States) Mike Skeen
34	(United States) Conquest Racing	Ferrari 296 GT3	(Spain) Albert Costa	(United States) Manny Franco	(Monaco) Cédric Sbirrazzuoli
43	(United States) Andretti Motorsports	Porsche 911 GT3 R (992)	(United States) Jarett Andretti	(Colombia) Gabby Chaves	(Canada) Scott Hargrove
44	(United States) Magnus Racing	Aston Martin Vantage AMR GT3 Evo	(United States) Andy Lally	(United States) John Potter	(United States) Spencer Pumpelly
45	(United States) Wayne Taylor Racing with Andretti	Lamborghini Huracán GT3 Evo 2	(United States) Graham Doyle	(Costa Rica) Danny Formal	(Canada) Kyle Marcelli
47	(Italy) Cetilar Racing	Ferrari 296 GT3	(Italy) Antonio Fuoco	(Italy) Roberto Lacorte	(Italy) Giorgio Sernagiotto
55	(Germany) Proton Competition	Ford Mustang GT3	(United Kingdom) Ben Barker	(Italy) Giammarco Levorato	(United States) Corey Lewis
56	(United States) DragonSpeed	Ferrari 296 GT3	(Sweden) Henrik Hedman	(Sweden) Rasmus Lindh	(Finland) Toni Vilander
57	(United States) Winward Racing	Mercedes-AMG GT3 Evo	(Netherlands) Indy Dontje	(Switzerland) Philip Ellis	(United States) Russell Ward
66	(United States) Gradient Racing	Acura NSX GT3 Evo22	(Colombia) Tatiana Calderón	(United Kingdom) Stevan McAleer	(United States) Sheena Monk
70	(United Kingdom) Inception Racing	Ferrari 296 GT3	(United States) Brendan Iribe	(United Kingdom) Ollie Millroy	(Denmark) Frederik Schandorff
78	(United States) Forte Racing	Lamborghini Huracán GT3 Evo 2	(Canada) Devlin DeFrancesco	(Canada) Misha Goikhberg	(Italy) Loris Spinelli
80	(United States) Lone Star Racing	Mercedes-AMG GT3 Evo	(Angola) Rui Andrade	(Australia) Scott Andrews	(Turkey) Salih Yoluç
83	(Italy) Iron Dames	Lamborghini Huracán GT3 Evo 2	(Belgium) Sarah Bovy	(Switzerland) Rahel Frey	(Denmark) Michelle Gatting
86	(United States) MDK Motorsports	Porsche 911 GT3 R (992)	(Denmark) Anders Fjordbach	(New Zealand) Brendon Leitch	(China) Kerong Li
90	(United States) Kellymoss with Riley	Porsche 911 GT3 R (992)	(Netherlands) Kay van Berlo	(United States) Riley Dickinson	(United States) Jake Pedersen
96	(United States) Turner Motorsport	BMW M4 GT3	(United States) Robby Foley	(United States) Patrick Gallagher	(United States) Jake Walker
120	(United States) Wright Motorsports	Porsche 911 GT3 R (992)	(United States) Adam Adelson	(Belgium) Jan Heylen	(United States) Elliott Skeer

== Practice ==
There were two practice sessions preceding the start of the race on Sunday, one on Friday morning and one on Saturday morning. Both the session on Friday morning and on Saturday morning lasted 90 minutes.

In the first session, Jaminet set the fastest time in the No. 6 PPM Porsche at 1 minute, 16.138 seconds, 0.039 seconds faster than van der Zande's No. 01 CGR car. De Phillippi and his teammate Krohn were third and fourth for BMW. Jordan Taylor put the No. 40 WTR Acura fifth overall. Mikkel Jensen led LMP2 in TDS Racing's No. 11 car with a 1-minute, 17.368-second lap, faster than Dillmann's No. 52 Inter Europol by PR1/Mathiasen Motorsports Oreca. Kirchhöfer's 1:24.030 lap led the GTD Pro class in Pfaff's car, 0.075 seconds faster than Sellers' Paul Miller BMW; Roman De Angelis's No. 027 Heart Aston Martin was third. Riccardo Agostini's No. 023 Triarsi Ferrari recorded the fastest lap amongst all GTD cars: 1:23.855, followed by Spinelli's No. 78 Forte vehicle.

Louis Delétraz led the final session in the No. 40 WTR car with a lap of 1 minute, 15.422 seconds. Nasr's No. 7 PPM Porsche was second-fastest. Grosjean was third in the No. 63 Iron Lynx Lamborghini and Ricky Taylor in the No. 10 WTR Acura was fourth. Hanley led LMP2 with a 1:17.560 lap in United Autosports No. 2 Oreca, 0.172 seconds ahead of Dillmann's Inter Europol by PR1/Mathiasen Motorsports car. Heinrich led GTD Pro in AO Racing's No. 77 car with a 1:23.494 lap, 0.092 seconds faster than Riberas' No. 23 Heart Aston Martin. Fjordbach's No. 86 MDK car paced GTD, followed by Ward's No. 57 Windward Mercedes-AMG. One red flag was shown during the session: Giammarco Levorato spun the No. 55 Proton Ford at turn 3 and stopped on track mid-session.

== Qualifying ==
Saturday's afternoon qualifying session was broken into three sessions, with one session for the GTP, LMP2, GTD Pro and GTD classes, which lasted 15 minutes each. The rules dictated that all teams nominated a driver to qualify their cars, with the Pro-Am LMP2 class requiring a Bronze rated driver to qualify the car. The competitors' fastest lap times determined the starting order. IMSA then arranged the grid to put GTPs ahead of the LMP2, GTD Pro, and GTD cars.

=== Qualifying results ===
Pole positions in each class are indicated in bold and with ‡.

Pos.	Class	No.	Entry	Driver	Time	Gap	Grid
1	**GTP**	**01**	**(United States) Cadillac Racing**	**(France) Sébastien Bourdais**	**1:14.592**	—	1‡
2	GTP	40	(United States) Wayne Taylor Racing with Andretti	(Switzerland) Louis Delétraz	1:14.817	+0.225	2
3	GTP	6	(Germany) Porsche Penske Motorsport	(France) Mathieu Jaminet	1:14.848	+0.256	3
4	GTP	31	(United States) Whelen Cadillac Racing	(United Kingdom) Jack Aitken	1:14.936	+0.344	4
5	GTP	25	(United States) BMW M Team RLL	(United States) Connor De Phillippi	1:14.996	+0.404	5
6	GTP	10	(United States) Wayne Taylor Racing with Andretti	(United States) Ricky Taylor	1:15.008	+0.416	6
7	GTP	7	(Germany) Porsche Penske Motorsport	(Brazil) Felipe Nasr	1:15.083	+0.491	7
8	GTP	24	(United States) BMW M Team RLL	(Austria) Philipp Eng	1:15.120	+0.528	8
9	GTP	5	(Germany) Proton Competition Mustang Sampling	(Italy) Gianmaria Bruni	1:15.343	+0.751	9
10	GTP	63	(Italy) Lamborghini – Iron Lynx	(France) Romain Grosjean	1:15.495	+0.903	10
11	GTP	85	(United States) JDC–Miller MotorSports	(Netherlands) Tijmen van der Helm	1:15.767	+1.175	11
12	**LMP2**	**52**	**(Poland) Inter Europol by PR1/Mathiasen Motorsports**	**(United States) Nick Boulle**	**1:17.618**	**+3.026**	12‡
13	LMP2	11	(France) TDS Racing	(United States) Steven Thomas	1:18.079	+3.487	13
14	LMP2	2	(United States) United Autosports USA	(United States) Ben Keating	1:18.091	+3.499	14
15	LMP2	99	(United States) AO Racing	(United States) P. J. Hyett	1:18.107	+3.515	15
16	LMP2	22	(United States) United Autosports USA	(United States) Dan Goldburg	1:18.180	+3.588	16
17	LMP2	88	(Italy) Richard Mille AF Corse	(Argentina) Luis Pérez Companc	1:18.681	+4.089	17
18	LMP2	74	(United States) Riley	(United States) Gar Robinson	1:18.976	+4.384	18
19	LMP2	18	(United States) Era Motorsport	(United States) Dwight Merriman	1:20.028	+5.436	19
20	LMP2	20	(Denmark) MDK by High Class Racing	(Denmark) Dennis Andersen	1:20.315	+5.723	20
21	LMP2	8	(United States) Tower Motorsports	(Canada) John Farano	1:20.596	+6.004	21
22	GTD Pro	77	(United States) AO Racing	(Germany) Laurin Heinrich	1:23.150	+8.558	56^{1}
23	**GTD Pro**	**4**	**(United States) Corvette Racing by Pratt Miller Motorsports**	**(Netherlands) Nicky Catsburg**	**1:23.209**	**+8.617**	22‡
24	GTD Pro	64	(Canada) Ford Multimatic Motorsports	(Germany) Mike Rockenfeller	1:23.245	+8.653	23
25	GTD Pro	1	(United States) Paul Miller Racing	(United States) Neil Verhagen	1:23.261	+8.669	24
26	GTD Pro	3	(United States) Corvette Racing by Pratt Miller Motorsports	(United Kingdom) Alexander Sims	1:23.298	+8.706	25
27	GTD Pro	23	(United States) Heart of Racing Team	(Spain) Alex Riberas	1:23.344	+8.752	26
28	GTD Pro	62	(United States) Risi Competizione	(Brazil) Daniel Serra	1:23.399	+8.807	27
29	GTD Pro	027	(United States) Heart of Racing Team	(Canada) Roman De Angelis	1:23.506	+8.914	28
30	**GTD**	**32**	**(United States) Korthoff/Preston Motorsports**	**(Canada) Mikaël Grenier**	**1:23.537**	**+8.945**	29‡
31	GTD	55	(Germany) Proton Competition	(Italy) Giammarco Levorato	1:23.799	+9.207	30
32	GTD Pro	75	(Australia) SunEnergy1 Racing	(Australia) Chaz Mostert	1:23.856	+9.264	31
33	GTD Pro	19	(Italy) Iron Lynx	(Germany) Maximilian Paul	1:23.886	+9.294	32
34	GTD Pro	14	(United States) Vasser Sullivan	(United Kingdom) Jack Hawksworth	1:23.909	+9.317	33
35	GTD Pro	9	(Canada) Pfaff Motorsports	(Germany) Marvin Kirchhöfer	1:23.923	+9.331	34
36	GTD	12	(United States) Vasser Sullivan	(Canada) Parker Thompson	1:23.939	+9.347	55^{2}
37	GTD	96	(United States) Turner Motorsport	(United States) Patrick Gallagher	1:23.948	+9.356	35
38	GTD Pro	65	(Canada) Ford Multimatic Motorsports	(Germany) Dirk Müller	1:23.984	+9.392	36
39	GTD	57	(United States) Winward Racing	(United States) Russell Ward	1:24.114	+9.522	37
40	GTD	78	(United States) Forte Racing	(Canada) Devlin DeFrancesco	1:24.128	+9.536	38
41	GTD	45	(United States) Wayne Taylor Racing with Andretti	(Costa Rica) Danny Formal	1:24.355	+9.763	39
42	GTD	34	(United States) Conquest Racing	(United States) Manny Franco	1:24.386	+9.794	40
43	GTD	83	(Italy) Iron Dames	(Denmark) Michelle Gatting	1:24.482	+9.890	41
44	GTD	66	(United States) Gradient Racing	(United States) Sheena Monk	1:24.559	+9.967	42
45	GTD	90	(United States) Kellymoss with Riley	(United States) Jake Pedersen	1:24.595	+10.003	43
46	GTD	86	(United States) MDK Motorsports	(China) Kerong Li	1:24.660	+10.068	44
47	GTD	023	(United States) Triarsi Competizione	(United States) Charlie Scardina	1:24.702	+10.110	45
48	GTD	21	(Italy) AF Corse	(France) François Heriau	1:24.788	+10.196	46
49	GTD	120	(United States) Wright Motorsports	(United States) Adam Adelson	1:24.796	+10.204	47
50	GTD	70	(United Kingdom) Inception Racing	(United States) Brendan Iribe	1:25.154	+10.562	48
51	GTD	47	(Italy) Cetilar Racing	(Italy) Roberto Lacorte	1:25.184	+10.592	49
52	GTD	44	(United States) Magnus Racing	(United States) John Potter	1:25.337	+10.745	50
53	GTD	43	(United States) Andretti Motorsports	(United States) Jarett Andretti	1:25.427	+10.835	51
54	GTD	13	(Canada) AWA	(Canada) Orey Fidani	1:25.722	+11.130	52
55	GTD	80	(United States) Lone Star Racing	(Turkey) Salih Yoluç	No Time Established^{3}		53
56	GTD	56	(United States) DragonSpeed	(Sweden) Rasmus Lindh	No Time Established^{4}		54
Sources:

- ^{1} The No. 77 AO Racing entry was moved to the back of the GTD class after failing post-qualifying technical inspection, and lost pole position in GTD Pro.
- ^{2} The No. 12 Vasser Sullivan entry was moved to the back of the GTD class after failing post-qualifying technical inspection.
- ^{3} The No. 80 Lone Star Racing entry had all its lap times deleted after working on the car during qualifying.
- ^{4} The No. 56 DragonSpeed entry had all its lap times deleted after working on the car during qualifying.

== Race ==
=== Post-race ===
The final results of GTP meant Cameron and Nasr extended their advantage the Drivers' Championship to 124 points over Jaminet and Tandy. Boulle and Dillmann's second-place finish allowed them to extend their advantage over Fraga and Robinson in the LMP2 Drivers' Championship. Heinrich's victory in GTD Pro allowed him to increase his lead in the GTD Pro Drivers' Championship to 99 points over Gunn. Ellis and Ward's fifth-place finish allowed them to keep their advantage over Foley and Gallagher in the GTD Drivers' Championship. Porsche and Mercedes-AMG continued to top their respective Manufacturers' Championships, while Porsche Penske Motorsport, Inter Europol by PR1/Mathiasen Motorsports, AO Racing, and Winward Racing kept their respective advantages in their of Teams' Championships with one round remaining.

Class winners are in bold and ‡.

Pos	Class	No	Team	Drivers	Chassis	Laps	Time/Retired
Pos	Class	No	Team	Drivers	Engine	Laps	Time/Retired
1	**GTP**	**24**	**(United States) BMW M Team RLL**	**(Austria) Philipp Eng (Finland) Jesse Krohn**	**BMW M Hybrid V8**	**219**	**6:00:54.050‡**
1	**GTP**	**24**	**(United States) BMW M Team RLL**	**(Austria) Philipp Eng (Finland) Jesse Krohn**	**BMW P66/3 4.0 L twin-turbo V8**	**219**	**6:00:54.050‡**
2	GTP	25	(United States) BMW M Team RLL	(United States) Connor De Phillippi (United Kingdom) Nick Yelloly	BMW M Hybrid V8	219	+1.647
2	GTP	25	(United States) BMW M Team RLL	(United States) Connor De Phillippi (United Kingdom) Nick Yelloly	BMW P66/3 4.0 L twin-turbo V8	219	+1.647
3	GTP	85	(United States) JDC–Miller MotorSports	(United Kingdom) Phil Hanson (Netherlands) Tijmen van der Helm (United Kingdom) Richard Westbrook	Porsche 963	219	+19.176
3	GTP	85	(United States) JDC–Miller MotorSports	(United Kingdom) Phil Hanson (Netherlands) Tijmen van der Helm (United Kingdom) Richard Westbrook	Porsche 9RD 4.6 L twin-turbo V8	219	+19.176
4	GTP	10	(United States) Wayne Taylor Racing with Andretti	(Portugal) Filipe Albuquerque (United States) Ricky Taylor	Acura ARX-06	219	+52.525
4	GTP	10	(United States) Wayne Taylor Racing with Andretti	(Portugal) Filipe Albuquerque (United States) Ricky Taylor	Acura AR24e 2.4 L twin-turbo V6	219	+52.525
5	GTP	5	(Germany) Proton Competition Mustang Sampling	(Italy) Gianmaria Bruni (Belgium) Alessio Picariello (Netherlands) Bent Viscaal	Porsche 963	218	+1 Lap
5	GTP	5	(Germany) Proton Competition Mustang Sampling	(Italy) Gianmaria Bruni (Belgium) Alessio Picariello (Netherlands) Bent Viscaal	Porsche 9RD 4.6 L twin-turbo V8	218	+1 Lap
6	GTP	01	(United States) Cadillac Racing	(France) Sébastien Bourdais (Netherlands) Renger van der Zande	Cadillac V-Series.R	216	+3 Laps
6	GTP	01	(United States) Cadillac Racing	(France) Sébastien Bourdais (Netherlands) Renger van der Zande	Cadillac LMC55R 5.5 L V8	216	+3 Laps
7	**LMP2**	**11**	**(France) TDS Racing**	**(Denmark) Mikkel Jensen (New Zealand) Hunter McElrea (United States) Steven Thomas**	**Oreca 07**	**215**	**+4 Laps‡**
7	**LMP2**	**11**	**(France) TDS Racing**	**(Denmark) Mikkel Jensen (New Zealand) Hunter McElrea (United States) Steven Thomas**	**Gibson GK428 4.2 L V8**	**215**	**+4 Laps‡**
8	LMP2	52	(Poland) Inter Europol by PR1/Mathiasen Motorsports	(United States) Nick Boulle (France) Tom Dillmann (Poland) Jakub Śmiechowski	Oreca 07	215	+4 Laps
8	LMP2	52	(Poland) Inter Europol by PR1/Mathiasen Motorsports	(United States) Nick Boulle (France) Tom Dillmann (Poland) Jakub Śmiechowski	Gibson GK428 4.2 L V8	215	+4 Laps
9	LMP2	18	(United States) Era Motorsport	(United Kingdom) Ryan Dalziel (United States) Dwight Merriman (United States) Connor Zilisch	Oreca 07	215	+4 Laps
9	LMP2	18	(United States) Era Motorsport	(United Kingdom) Ryan Dalziel (United States) Dwight Merriman (United States) Connor Zilisch	Gibson GK428 4.2 L V8	215	+4 Laps
10	LMP2	99	(United States) AO Racing	(Australia) Matthew Brabham (France) Paul-Loup Chatin (United States) P. J. Hyett	Oreca 07	215	+4 Laps
10	LMP2	99	(United States) AO Racing	(Australia) Matthew Brabham (France) Paul-Loup Chatin (United States) P. J. Hyett	Gibson GK428 4.2 L V8	215	+4 Laps
11	LMP2	74	(United States) Riley	(Australia) Josh Burdon (Brazil) Felipe Fraga (United States) Gar Robinson	Oreca 07	214	+5 Laps
11	LMP2	74	(United States) Riley	(Australia) Josh Burdon (Brazil) Felipe Fraga (United States) Gar Robinson	Gibson GK428 4.2 L V8	214	+5 Laps
12	LMP2	88	(Italy) Richard Mille AF Corse	(Argentina) Luis Pérez Companc (United States) Dylan Murry (Denmark) Nicklas Nielsen	Oreca 07	214	+5 Laps
12	LMP2	88	(Italy) Richard Mille AF Corse	(Argentina) Luis Pérez Companc (United States) Dylan Murry (Denmark) Nicklas Nielsen	Gibson GK428 4.2 L V8	214	+5 Laps
13	LMP2	22	(United States) United Autosports USA	(United States) Bijoy Garg (United States) Dan Goldburg (United Kingdom) Paul di Resta	Oreca 07	214	+5 Laps
13	LMP2	22	(United States) United Autosports USA	(United States) Bijoy Garg (United States) Dan Goldburg (United Kingdom) Paul di Resta	Gibson GK428 4.2 L V8	214	+5 Laps
14	LMP2	8	(United States) Tower Motorsports	(United States) Michael Dinan (Republic of Ireland) Charlie Eastwood (Canada) John Farano	Oreca 07	213	+6 Laps
14	LMP2	8	(United States) Tower Motorsports	(United States) Michael Dinan (Republic of Ireland) Charlie Eastwood (Canada) John Farano	Gibson GK428 4.2 L V8	213	+6 Laps
15	GTP	7	(Germany) Porsche Penske Motorsport	(United States) Dane Cameron (Brazil) Felipe Nasr	Porsche 963	212	+7 Laps
15	GTP	7	(Germany) Porsche Penske Motorsport	(United States) Dane Cameron (Brazil) Felipe Nasr	Porsche 9RD 4.6 L twin-turbo V8	212	+7 Laps
16	**GTD Pro**	**77**	**(United States) AO Racing**	**(Denmark) Michael Christensen (Germany) Laurin Heinrich**	**Porsche 911 GT3 R (992)**	**208**	**+11 Laps‡**
16	**GTD Pro**	**77**	**(United States) AO Racing**	**(Denmark) Michael Christensen (Germany) Laurin Heinrich**	**Porsche M97/80 4.2 L Flat-6**	**208**	**+11 Laps‡**
17	GTD Pro	64	(Canada) Ford Multimatic Motorsports	(Germany) Mike Rockenfeller (United Kingdom) Harry Tincknell	Ford Mustang GT3	208	+11 Laps
17	GTD Pro	64	(Canada) Ford Multimatic Motorsports	(Germany) Mike Rockenfeller (United Kingdom) Harry Tincknell	Ford Coyote 5.4 L V8	208	+11 Laps
18	GTD Pro	3	(United States) Corvette Racing by Pratt Miller Motorsports	(Spain) Antonio García (United Kingdom) Alexander Sims	Chevrolet Corvette Z06 GT3.R	208	+11 Laps
18	GTD Pro	3	(United States) Corvette Racing by Pratt Miller Motorsports	(Spain) Antonio García (United Kingdom) Alexander Sims	Chevrolet LT6 5.5 L V8	208	+11 Laps
19	GTD Pro	14	(United States) Vasser Sullivan	(United Kingdom) Ben Barnicoat (United Kingdom) Jack Hawksworth	Lexus RC F GT3	208	+11 Laps
19	GTD Pro	14	(United States) Vasser Sullivan	(United Kingdom) Ben Barnicoat (United Kingdom) Jack Hawksworth	Toyota 2UR-GSE 5.0 L V8	208	+11 Laps
20	GTD Pro	23	(United States) Heart of Racing Team	(United Kingdom) Ross Gunn (Spain) Alex Riberas	Aston Martin Vantage AMR GT3 Evo	208	+11 Laps
20	GTD Pro	23	(United States) Heart of Racing Team	(United Kingdom) Ross Gunn (Spain) Alex Riberas	Aston Martin M177 4.0 L Turbo V8	208	+11 Laps
21	GTD Pro	027	(United States) Heart of Racing Team	(Canada) Roman De Angelis (Germany) Mario Farnbacher	Aston Martin Vantage AMR GT3 Evo	208	+11 Laps
21	GTD Pro	027	(United States) Heart of Racing Team	(Canada) Roman De Angelis (Germany) Mario Farnbacher	Aston Martin M177 4.0 L Turbo V8	208	+11 Laps
22	GTD Pro	75	(Australia) SunEnergy1 Racing	(Australia) Kenny Habul (Australia) Jordan Love (Australia) Chaz Mostert	Mercedes-AMG GT3 Evo	208	+11 Laps
22	GTD Pro	75	(Australia) SunEnergy1 Racing	(Australia) Kenny Habul (Australia) Jordan Love (Australia) Chaz Mostert	Mercedes-AMG M159 6.2 L V8	208	+11 Laps
23	GTD Pro	1	(United States) Paul Miller Racing	(United States) Bryan Sellers (United States) Madison Snow (United States) Neil Verhagen	BMW M4 GT3	208	+11 Laps
23	GTD Pro	1	(United States) Paul Miller Racing	(United States) Bryan Sellers (United States) Madison Snow (United States) Neil Verhagen	BMW P58 3.0 L Turbo I6	208	+11 Laps
24	GTD Pro	62	(United States) Risi Competizione	(Italy) Davide Rigon (Brazil) Daniel Serra	Ferrari 296 GT3	207	+12 Laps
24	GTD Pro	62	(United States) Risi Competizione	(Italy) Davide Rigon (Brazil) Daniel Serra	Ferrari F163 3.0 L Turbo V6	207	+12 Laps
25	**GTD**	**120**	**(United States) Wright Motorsports**	**(United States) Adam Adelson (Belgium) Jan Heylen (United States) Elliott Skeer**	**Porsche 911 GT3 R (992)**	**207**	**+12 Laps‡**
25	**GTD**	**120**	**(United States) Wright Motorsports**	**(United States) Adam Adelson (Belgium) Jan Heylen (United States) Elliott Skeer**	**Porsche M97/80 4.2 L Flat-6**	**207**	**+12 Laps‡**
26	GTD	96	(United States) Turner Motorsport	(United States) Robby Foley (United States) Patrick Gallagher (United States) Jake Walker	BMW M4 GT3	207	+12 Laps
26	GTD	96	(United States) Turner Motorsport	(United States) Robby Foley (United States) Patrick Gallagher (United States) Jake Walker	BMW P58 3.0 L Turbo I6	207	+12 Laps
27	GTD Pro	9	(Canada) Pfaff Motorsports	(United Kingdom) Oliver Jarvis (Germany) Marvin Kirchhöfer	McLaren 720S GT3 Evo	207	+12 Laps
27	GTD Pro	9	(Canada) Pfaff Motorsports	(United Kingdom) Oliver Jarvis (Germany) Marvin Kirchhöfer	McLaren M840T 4.0 L Turbo V8	207	+12 Laps
28	GTD	32	(United States) Korthoff/Preston Motorsports	(Canada) Mikaël Grenier (United States) Kenton Koch (United States) Mike Skeen	Mercedes-AMG GT3 Evo	207	+12 Laps
28	GTD	32	(United States) Korthoff/Preston Motorsports	(Canada) Mikaël Grenier (United States) Kenton Koch (United States) Mike Skeen	Mercedes-AMG M159 6.2 L V8	207	+12 Laps
29	GTD	78	(United States) Forte Racing	(Canada) Devlin DeFrancesco (Canada) Misha Goikhberg (Italy) Loris Spinelli	Lamborghini Huracán GT3 Evo 2	207	+12 Laps
29	GTD	78	(United States) Forte Racing	(Canada) Devlin DeFrancesco (Canada) Misha Goikhberg (Italy) Loris Spinelli	Lamborghini DGF 5.2 L V10	207	+12 Laps
30	GTD	57	(United States) Winward Racing	(Netherlands) Indy Dontje (Switzerland) Philip Ellis (United States) Russell Ward	Mercedes-AMG GT3 Evo	207	+12 Laps
30	GTD	57	(United States) Winward Racing	(Netherlands) Indy Dontje (Switzerland) Philip Ellis (United States) Russell Ward	Mercedes-AMG M159 6.2 L V8	207	+12 Laps
31	GTD	13	(Canada) AWA	(United Kingdom) Matt Bell (Canada) Orey Fidani (Germany) Lars Kern	Chevrolet Corvette Z06 GT3.R	207	+12 Laps
31	GTD	13	(Canada) AWA	(United Kingdom) Matt Bell (Canada) Orey Fidani (Germany) Lars Kern	Chevrolet LT6 5.5 L V8	207	+12 Laps
32	GTD	47	(Italy) Cetilar Racing	(Italy) Antonio Fuoco (Italy) Roberto Lacorte (Italy) Giorgio Sernagiotto	Ferrari 296 GT3	207	+12 Laps
32	GTD	47	(Italy) Cetilar Racing	(Italy) Antonio Fuoco (Italy) Roberto Lacorte (Italy) Giorgio Sernagiotto	Ferrari F163 3.0 L Turbo V6	207	+12 Laps
33	GTD	90	(United States) Kellymoss with Riley	(Netherlands) Kay van Berlo (United States) Riley Dickinson (United States) Jake Pedersen	Porsche 911 GT3 R (992)	207	+12 Laps
33	GTD	90	(United States) Kellymoss with Riley	(Netherlands) Kay van Berlo (United States) Riley Dickinson (United States) Jake Pedersen	Porsche M97/80 4.2 L Flat-6	207	+12 Laps
34	GTD	70	(United Kingdom) Inception Racing	(United States) Brendan Iribe (United Kingdom) Ollie Millroy (Denmark) Frederik Schandorff	Ferrari 296 GT3	206	+13 Laps
34	GTD	70	(United Kingdom) Inception Racing	(United States) Brendan Iribe (United Kingdom) Ollie Millroy (Denmark) Frederik Schandorff	Ferrari F163 3.0 L Turbo V6	206	+13 Laps
35	GTD	45	(United States) Wayne Taylor Racing with Andretti	(United States) Graham Doyle (Costa Rica) Danny Formal (Canada) Kyle Marcelli	Lamborghini Huracán GT3 Evo 2	206	+13 Laps
35	GTD	45	(United States) Wayne Taylor Racing with Andretti	(United States) Graham Doyle (Costa Rica) Danny Formal (Canada) Kyle Marcelli	Lamborghini DGF 5.2 L V10	206	+13 Laps
36	GTD	44	(United States) Magnus Racing	(United States) Andy Lally (United States) John Potter (United States) Spencer Pumpelly	Aston Martin Vantage AMR GT3 Evo	206	+13 Laps
36	GTD	44	(United States) Magnus Racing	(United States) Andy Lally (United States) John Potter (United States) Spencer Pumpelly	Aston Martin M177 4.0 L Turbo V8	206	+13 Laps
37	GTD	86	(United States) MDK Motorsports	(Denmark) Anders Fjordbach (New Zealand) Brendon Leitch (China) Kerong Li	Porsche 911 GT3 R (992)	206	+13 Laps
37	GTD	86	(United States) MDK Motorsports	(Denmark) Anders Fjordbach (New Zealand) Brendon Leitch (China) Kerong Li	Porsche M97/80 4.2 L Flat-6	206	+13 Laps
38	GTD	56	(United States) DragonSpeed	(Sweden) Henrik Hedman (Sweden) Rasmus Lindh (Finland) Toni Vilander	Ferrari 296 GT3	205	+14 Laps
38	GTD	56	(United States) DragonSpeed	(Sweden) Henrik Hedman (Sweden) Rasmus Lindh (Finland) Toni Vilander	Ferrari F163 3.0 L Turbo V6	205	+14 Laps
39	GTD	43	(United States) Andretti Motorsports	(United States) Jarett Andretti (Colombia) Gabby Chaves (Canada) Scott Hargrove	Porsche 911 GT3 R (992)	205	+14 Laps
39	GTD	43	(United States) Andretti Motorsports	(United States) Jarett Andretti (Colombia) Gabby Chaves (Canada) Scott Hargrove	Porsche M97/80 4.2 L Flat-6	205	+14 Laps
40	GTD Pro	4	(United States) Corvette Racing by Pratt Miller Motorsports	(Netherlands) Nicky Catsburg (United States) Tommy Milner	Chevrolet Corvette Z06 GT3.R	204	+15 Laps
40	GTD Pro	4	(United States) Corvette Racing by Pratt Miller Motorsports	(Netherlands) Nicky Catsburg (United States) Tommy Milner	Chevrolet LT6 5.5 L V8	204	+15 Laps
41	GTD	80	(United States) Lone Star Racing	(Angola) Rui Andrade (Australia) Scott Andrews (Turkey) Salih Yoluç	Mercedes-AMG GT3 Evo	203	+16 Laps
41	GTD	80	(United States) Lone Star Racing	(Angola) Rui Andrade (Australia) Scott Andrews (Turkey) Salih Yoluç	Mercedes-AMG M159 6.2 L V8	203	+16 Laps
42	GTD	66	(United States) Gradient Racing	(Colombia) Tatiana Calderón (United Kingdom) Stevan McAleer (United States) Sheena Monk	Acura NSX GT3 Evo22	193	+26 Laps
42	GTD	66	(United States) Gradient Racing	(Colombia) Tatiana Calderón (United Kingdom) Stevan McAleer (United States) Sheena Monk	Acura JNC1 3.5 L Turbo V6	193	+26 Laps
43	LMP2	2	(United States) United Autosports USA	(United Kingdom) Ben Hanley (United States) Ben Keating (Chile) Nico Pino	Oreca 07	188	+31 Laps
43	LMP2	2	(United States) United Autosports USA	(United Kingdom) Ben Hanley (United States) Ben Keating (Chile) Nico Pino	Gibson GK428 4.2 L V8	188	+31 Laps
44	GTD Pro	65	(Canada) Ford Multimatic Motorsports	(United States) Joey Hand (Germany) Dirk Müller	Ford Mustang GT3	164	+55 Laps
44	GTD Pro	65	(Canada) Ford Multimatic Motorsports	(United States) Joey Hand (Germany) Dirk Müller	Ford Coyote 5.4 L V8	164	+55 Laps
45 DNF	GTD	55	(Germany) Proton Competition	(United Kingdom) Ben Barker (Italy) Giammarco Levorato (United States) Corey Lewis	Ford Mustang GT3	162	Retired
45 DNF	GTD	55	(Germany) Proton Competition	(United Kingdom) Ben Barker (Italy) Giammarco Levorato (United States) Corey Lewis	Ford Coyote 5.4 L V8	162	Retired
46 DNF	GTD	83	(Italy) Iron Dames	(Belgium) Sarah Bovy (Switzerland) Rahel Frey (Denmark) Michelle Gatting	Lamborghini Huracán GT3 Evo 2	162	Retired
46 DNF	GTD	83	(Italy) Iron Dames	(Belgium) Sarah Bovy (Switzerland) Rahel Frey (Denmark) Michelle Gatting	Lamborghini DGF 5.2 L V10	162	Retired
47 DNF	LMP2	20	(Denmark) MDK by High Class Racing	(Denmark) Dennis Andersen (United States) Scott Huffaker (United States) Seth Lucas	Oreca 07	158	Retired
47 DNF	LMP2	20	(Denmark) MDK by High Class Racing	(Denmark) Dennis Andersen (United States) Scott Huffaker (United States) Seth Lucas	Gibson GK428 4.2 L V8	158	Retired
48 DNF	GTD	34	(United States) Conquest Racing	(Spain) Albert Costa (United States) Manny Franco (Monaco) Cédric Sbirrazzuoli	Ferrari 296 GT3	156	Retired
48 DNF	GTD	34	(United States) Conquest Racing	(Spain) Albert Costa (United States) Manny Franco (Monaco) Cédric Sbirrazzuoli	Ferrari F163 3.0 L Turbo V6	156	Retired
49 DNF	GTP	63	(Italy) Lamborghini – Iron Lynx	(Italy) Matteo Cairoli (Italy) Andrea Caldarelli (France) Romain Grosjean	Lamborghini SC63	152	Retired
49 DNF	GTP	63	(Italy) Lamborghini – Iron Lynx	(Italy) Matteo Cairoli (Italy) Andrea Caldarelli (France) Romain Grosjean	Lamborghini 3.8 L twin-turbo V8	152	Retired
50 DNF	GTD	21	(Italy) AF Corse	(France) François Heriau (United Kingdom) Simon Mann (Spain) Miguel Molina	Ferrari 296 GT3	103	Retired
50 DNF	GTD	21	(Italy) AF Corse	(France) François Heriau (United Kingdom) Simon Mann (Spain) Miguel Molina	Ferrari F163 3.0 L Turbo V6	103	Retired
51 DNF	GTD	023	(United States) Triarsi Competizione	(Italy) Riccardo Agostini (United States) Charlie Scardina (United States) Onofrio Triarsi	Ferrari 296 GT3	82	Retired
51 DNF	GTD	023	(United States) Triarsi Competizione	(Italy) Riccardo Agostini (United States) Charlie Scardina (United States) Onofrio Triarsi	Ferrari F163 3.0 L Turbo V6	82	Retired
52 DNF	GTP	31	(United States) Whelen Cadillac Racing	(United Kingdom) Jack Aitken (United Kingdom) Tom Blomqvist (Brazil) Pipo Derani	Cadillac V-Series.R	66	Retired
52 DNF	GTP	31	(United States) Whelen Cadillac Racing	(United Kingdom) Jack Aitken (United Kingdom) Tom Blomqvist (Brazil) Pipo Derani	Cadillac LMC55R 5.5 L V8	66	Retired
53	GTP	6	(Germany) Porsche Penske Motorsport	(France) Mathieu Jaminet (United Kingdom) Nick Tandy	Porsche 963	219	+2.947^{1}
53	GTP	6	(Germany) Porsche Penske Motorsport	(France) Mathieu Jaminet (United Kingdom) Nick Tandy	Porsche 9RD 4.6 L twin-turbo V8	219	+2.947^{1}
54	GTP	40	(United States) Wayne Taylor Racing with Andretti	(Switzerland) Louis Delétraz (United States) Jordan Taylor	Acura ARX-06	219	+42.434^{2}
54	GTP	40	(United States) Wayne Taylor Racing with Andretti	(Switzerland) Louis Delétraz (United States) Jordan Taylor	Acura AR24e 2.4 L twin-turbo V6	219	+42.434^{2}
55 DNF	GTD	12	(United States) Vasser Sullivan	(United States) Frankie Montecalvo (United States) Aaron Telitz (Canada) Parker Thompson	Lexus RC F GT3	27	Retired
55 DNF	GTD	12	(United States) Vasser Sullivan	(United States) Frankie Montecalvo (United States) Aaron Telitz (Canada) Parker Thompson	Toyota 2UR-GSE 5.0 L V8	27	Retired
56 DNF	GTD Pro	19	(Italy) Iron Lynx	(Germany) Luca Engstler (Germany) Maximilian Paul	Lamborghini Huracán GT3 Evo 2	2	Retired
56 DNF	GTD Pro	19	(Italy) Iron Lynx	(Germany) Luca Engstler (Germany) Maximilian Paul	Lamborghini DGF 5.2 L V10	2	Retired

- ^{1} The No. 6 Porsche Penske Motorsport entry was moved to the back of the GTP class after a modification of the homologated wiring harness.
- ^{2} The No. 40 Wayne Taylor Racing with Andretti entry was moved to the back of the GTP class after a modification of the homologated brake ducting system.

== Standings after the race ==
GTP Drivers' Championship standings
Pos.	+/–	Driver	Points
1		(United States) Dane Cameron (Brazil) Felipe Nasr	2650
2		(France) Mathieu Jaminet (United Kingdom) Nick Tandy	2526
3		(France) Sébastien Bourdais (Netherlands) Renger van der Zande	2486
4		(United Kingdom) Jack Aitken (Brazil) Pipo Derani	2392
5		(Switzerland) Louis Delétraz (United States) Jordan Taylor	2339

LMP2 Drivers' Championship standings
Pos.	+/–	Driver	Points
1		(United States) Nick Boulle (France) Tom Dillmann	1919
2		(Brazil) Felipe Fraga (United States) Gar Robinson	1821
3		(United Kingdom) Ryan Dalziel	1796
4	3	(United States) Steven Thomas	1722
5	1	(United Kingdom) Ben Hanley (United States) Ben Keating	1717

GTD Pro Drivers' Championship standings
Pos.	+/–	Driver	Points
1		(Germany) Laurin Heinrich	2887
2		(United Kingdom) Ross Gunn	2788
3		(United States) Bryan Sellers (United States) Madison Snow	2668
4		(United Kingdom) Ben Barnicoat (United Kingdom) Jack Hawksworth	2659
5		(Spain) Antonio García (United Kingdom) Alexander Sims	2646

GTD Drivers' Championship standings
Pos.	+/–	Driver	Points
1		(Switzerland) Philip Ellis (United States) Russell Ward	3006
2		(United States) Robby Foley (United States) Patrick Gallagher	2784
3		(Canada) Mikaël Grenier	2513
4		(Canada) Parker Thompson	2213
5	2	(Canada) Misha Goikhberg (Italy) Loris Spinelli	2213

- Note: Only the top five positions are included for all sets of standings.

GTP Teams' Championship standings
Pos.	+/–	Team	Points
1		#7 Porsche Penske Motorsport	2650
2		#6 Porsche Penske Motorsport	2526
3		#01 Cadillac Racing	2486
4		#31 Whelen Cadillac Racing	2392
5		#40 Wayne Taylor Racing with Andretti	2339

LMP2 Teams' Championship standings
Pos.	+/–	Team	Points
1		#52 Inter Europol by PR1/Mathiasen Motorsports	1919
2		#74 Riley	1821
3		#18 Era Motorsport	1796
4	3	#11 TDS Racing	1722
5	1	#2 United Autosports USA	1717

GTD Pro Teams' Championship standings
Pos.	+/–	Team	Points
1		#77 AO Racing	2887
2		#23 Heart of Racing Team	2788
3		#1 Paul Miller Racing	2668
4		#14 Vasser Sullivan	2659
5		#3 Corvette Racing by Pratt Miller Motorsports	2646

GTD Teams' Championship standings
Pos.	+/–	Team	Points
1		#57 Winward Racing	3006
2		#96 Turner Motorsport	2784
3		#32 Korthoff/Preston Motorsports	2513
4	2	#78 Forte Racing	2213
5	1	#34 Conquest Racing	2204

- Note: Only the top five positions are included for all sets of standings.

GTP Manufacturers' Championship standings
Pos.	+/–	Manufacturer	Points
1		(Germany) Porsche	2905
2		(United States) Cadillac	2781
3		(Japan) Acura	2748
4		(Germany) BMW	2566
5		(Italy) Lamborghini	858

GTD Pro Manufacturers' Championship standings
Pos.	+/–	Manufacturer	Points
1		(Germany) Porsche	2950
2		(United Kingdom) Aston Martin	2828
3	1	(United States) Chevrolet	2761
4	1	(Japan) Lexus	2730
5		(United States) Ford	2681

GTD Manufacturers' Championship standings
Pos.	+/–	Manufacturer	Points
1		(Germany) Mercedes-AMG	3217
2	1	(Germany) BMW	2646
3	1	(Italy) Lamborghini	2608
4	2	(Germany) Porsche	2607
5		(United Kingdom) Aston Martin	2518

- Note: Only the top five positions are included for all sets of standings.

IMSA SportsCar Championship
Previous race: Michelin GT Challenge at VIR	2024 season	Next race: Petit Le Mans
