= UAE4 Series =

Single-Seater Racing Championship

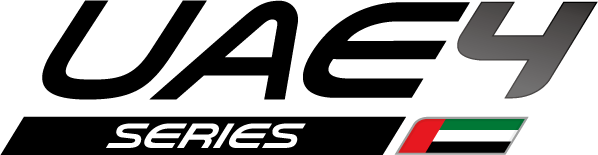
- Category: FIA Formula 4
- Country: United Arab Emirates
- Region: Middle East
- Inaugural season: 2016–17
- Constructors: Tatuus
- Engine suppliers: Abarth
- Tyre suppliers: Giti Tire
- Drivers' champion: (Ukraine) Oleksandr Bondarev
- Teams' champion: (France) R-ace GP
- Official website: Official website

The UAE4 Series, formerly Formula 4 UAE Championship and F4 Middle East Championship is a Formula 4 racing series. It was launched by the Fédération Internationale de l'Automobile, and its national affiliate the Automobile & Touring Club of the United Arab Emirates (ATCUAE), who acted as the championship's promoter. The series was governed by the Emirates Motorsport Organisation (EMSO) and promoted by AUH Motorsports.

== History ==
The logo of the original Formula 4 UAE certified by the FIA.

In 2013, the FIA Single seat commission announced their intention to introduce a new category of single seat racing in order to bridge the gap between karting and Formula 3.

Throughout the following two years, the ATCUAE has worked to develop a Formula 4 championship for the UAE, which will be the first in the Middle East and North African region. One of the first steps taken was to appoint Dubai based AUH Motorsports to manage the championship, based on their experience and expertise in having run the regional Radical Sportscars series for several years.

In February 2016, the Formula 4 UAE Championship was launched in spectacular fashion in front of the world's tallest building, the Burj Khalifa in Dubai, with the public unveiling of the car undertaken by HH Nahyan bin Mubarak Al Nahyan, the Minister of Culture and Knowledge Development and Chairman of the General Authority for Youth and Sports Welfare, and Mohammed Ben Sulayem, President of the ATCUAE.

Following the launch in February 2016, the car was given its first test around the Dubai Autodrome, driven by Dubai-born Indy Lights driver Ed Jones.

The championship was renamed by its promoters (Top Speed China) as F4 Middle East Championship in 2025 amidst the long-term expansion to the other countries of the Middle East region. In 2026, the championship has lost its FIA-certification and was renamed again as UAE4 Series.

== Format ==
The inaugural 2016–17 championship featured eighteen races over six weekends, four of which were held at the Yas Marina Circuit in Abu Dhabi, with the remaining two at the Dubai Autodrome. From 2019 to 2022, the championship featured twenty races over five rounds. The race weekends consist of two qualifying sessions determining grids for Race 1 and 3. Starting grids of Race 2 are set by the second fastest lap during Qualifying 1 and grids of Race 4 are with the top eight drivers having their positions reversed from Race 3 results.

A new three-race format was adopted since the 2023 season. The two qualifying sessions determine grids for Race 1 and 3. The grid for race two is set by reversing the top 10 from race one's results.

== Car ==
The championship features Tatuus designed and built cars. The cars are constructed out of carbon fibre and feature a monocoque chassis.

From 2016–17 season to 2021 the series used F4-T014 model and 1.4 turbo Abarth engine. The same combination of the chassis and the engine was used in the Italian F4 Championship, F4 Spanish Championship, ADAC Formula 4 and SMP F4 Championship.

In the 2022 season, the series was the host for the global debut of the new second-generation Tatuus F4-T421.

== Champions ==
=== Drivers ===
Season	Driver	Team	Races	Poles	Wins	Podiums	Fastest lap	Points	Margins
Formula 4 UAE Championship
2016–17	(South Africa) Jonathan Aberdein	(Germany) Team Motopark	18	10	14	16	12	368	107
2017–18	(Belgium) Charles Weerts	(United Arab Emirates) Dragon Motopark F4	23	3	8	16	9	377	52
2019	(Italy) Matteo Nannini	(United Arab Emirates) Xcel Motorsport	20	6	7	16	7	363	68
2020	(Italy) Francesco Pizzi	(United Arab Emirates) Xcel Motorsport	20	3	8	10	5	300	26
2021	(Italy) Enzo Trulli	(Italy) Cram Durango	20	0	4	13	5	319	1
2022	(Austria) Charlie Wurz	(Italy) Prema Racing	20	3	2	10	2	255	45
2023	(Australia) James Wharton	(India) Mumbai Falcons Racing Limited	15	4	4	11	5	232	20
2024	(United Kingdom) Freddie Slater	(India) Mumbai Falcons Racing Limited	15	0	2	6	4	172	4
F4 Middle East Championship
2025	(Italy) Emanuele Olivieri	(France) R-ace GP	15	5	6	13	9	339	58
UAE4 Series
2026	(Ukraine) Oleksandr Bondarev	(India) Mumbai Falcons Racing Limited	12	2	4	7	4	191	8

=== Teams ===
Season	Team	Drivers	Poles	Wins	Podiums	Fastest lap	Points	Margins
Formula 4 UAE Championship
2016–17	(Germany) Team Motopark	2	10	14	31	18	629	390
2017–18	(United Arab Emirates) Dragon Motopark F4	3	3	9	19	10	580	19
2019	(United Arab Emirates) Xcel Motorsport	5	8	11	30	11	632	171
2020	(United Arab Emirates) Xcel Motorsport	6	3	11	32	9	595	182
2021	(United Arab Emirates) Xcel Motorsport	9	14	11	34	12	617	255
2022	(Italy) Prema Racing	3	8	10	22	9	550	165
2023	(India) Mumbai Falcons Racing Limited	3	2	8	21	7	444	221
2024	(India) Mumbai Falcons Racing Limited	4	3	5	18	8	340	102
F4 Middle East Championship
2025	(France) R-ace GP	4	9	11	22	8	602	117
UAE4 Series
2026	(France) R-ace GP	5	5	4	13	6	301	40

=== Rookie ===
Season	Driver	Team
Formula 4 UAE Championship
2016–17	(United States) Logan Sargeant	(Germany) Team Motopark
2017–18	(Germany) David Schumacher	(United Arab Emirates) Rasgaira Motorsports
2019	(Italy) Matteo Nannini	(United Arab Emirates) Xcel Motorsport
2020	(Italy) Francesco Pizzi	(United Arab Emirates) Xcel Motorsport
2021	(Italy) Enzo Trulli	(Italy) Cram Durango
2022	(Brazil) Rafael Câmara	(Italy) Prema Racing
2023	(Finland) Tuukka Taponen	(India) Mumbai Falcons Racing Limited
2024	(United Kingdom) Kean Nakamura-Berta	(India) Mumbai Falcons Racing Limited
F4 Middle East Championship
2025	(Colombia) Salim Hanna	(India) Mumbai Falcons Racing Limited
UAE4 Series
2026	(United Kingdom) Kenzo Craigie	(France) R-ace GP

== Formula Trophy ==
Formula Trophy
- Category: FIA Formula 4
- Country: United Arab Emirates
- Inaugural season: 2024
- Drivers' champion: (Turkey) Alp Aksoy
- Teams' champion: (India) Mumbai Falcons Racing Limited

The Formula Trophy (formerly Formula Trophy UAE) is a racing series made up of an extended version of the F4 UAE's trophy round. Instead of a single round, the series is composed of two rounds at the Yas Marina Circuit and one round at the Dubai Autodrome.

The inaugural season was held in 2024. It was won by Kai Daryanani, who drove for Evans GP. Mumbai Falcons' Alp Aksoy succeeded him in 2025.

== Circuits of Formula 4 UAE Championship / F4 Middle East Championship / UAE4 Series ==
- **Bold** denotes a circuit used in the 2026 season.

Number	Circuits	Rounds	Years
1	(United Arab Emirates) **Yas Marina Circuit**	21 (Note: Yas Marina Circuit hosted 4 rounds in 2017–18 season, 3 rounds in 2016–17, 2024 and 2025 season, and 2 rounds in 2019–2022, and 2026 seasons.)	2016–present
2	(United Arab Emirates) **Dubai Autodrome**	20 (Note: Dubai Autodrome hosted 3 rounds in 2019–2022, 2 rounds in 2016–17, 2017–18, 2023 and 2024 seasons.)	2016–present
3	Kuwait Motor Town	2 (Note: Kuwait Motor Town hosted 2 rounds in 2023.)	2023
3	(Qatar) **Lusail International Circuit**	2	2025–present

== Circuits of Formula Trophy UAE (2024–present) ==
Number	Circuits	Rounds	Years
1	(United Arab Emirates) Yas Marina Circuit	4 (Note: Yas Marina Circuit hosted 2 rounds in 2024 and 2025.)	2024–2025
2	(United Arab Emirates) Dubai Autodrome	2	2024–2025
