= Matteo Nannini =

Italian-Argentine racing driver (born 2003)

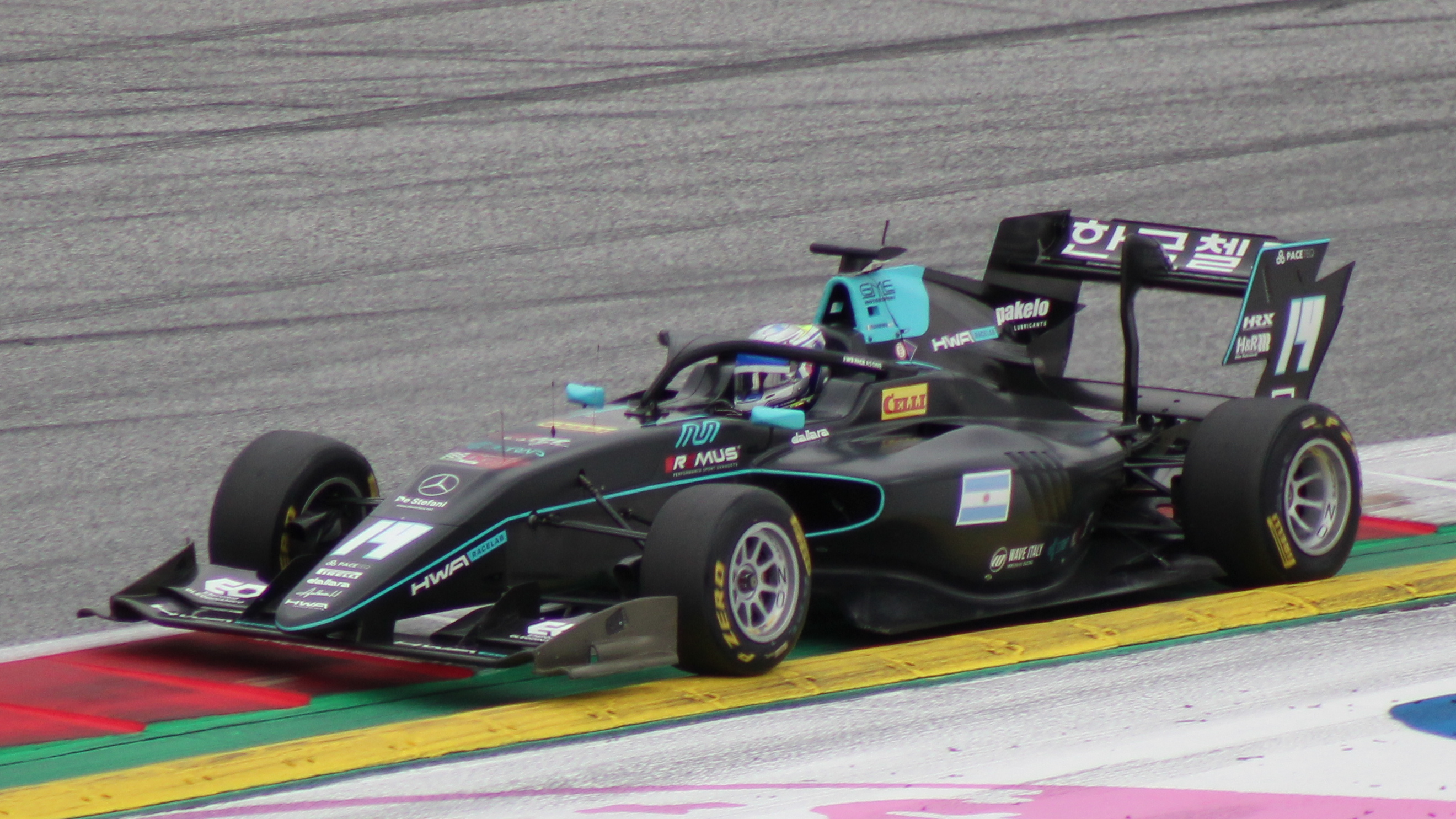
- Nannini driving the Dallara F3 2019 during the 2021 Spielberg Formula 3 round.
- Nationality: (Italy) Italian
- Born: 10 July 2003 (age 23) Faenza, Italy
- Relatives: Alessandro Nannini (first cousin once-removed); Gianna Nannini (first cousin once-removed)

FIA Formula 2 Championship career
- Debut season: 2021
- Categorisation: FIA Silver
- Car number: 20
- Former teams: HWA Racelab, Campos Racing
- Starts: 9 (8 entries)
- Wins: 0
- Podiums: 0
- Poles: 0
- Fastest laps: 0
- Best finish: 22nd in 2021

Previous series
- 2019 2019 2019 2019: Formula Renault Eurocup; Formula Regional European Championship; F4 Spanish Championship; Formula 4 UAE Championship

Championship titles
- 2019: Formula 4 UAE Championship

FIA Formula 3 Championship career
- Debut season: 2020
- Car number: 14
- Former teams: Jenzer Motorsport, HWA Racelab
- Starts: 38 (39 entries)
- Wins: 1
- Podiums: 3
- Poles: 0
- Fastest laps: 0
- Best finish: 14th in 2021

Matteo Nannini (born 10 July 2003) is an Italian and Argentinian racing driver who currently competes in the Indy NXT for Cape Motorsports powered by ECR.

Nannini was a race winner in the FIA Formula 3 Championship for HWA Racelab.

== Racing career ==
=== Karting ===
Nannini started karting at the age of six where he would go on to win a number of karting championships. In 2015, Nannini joined Fernando Alonso's karting team, and this is where Nannini won his second competition at Trofeo dei Campioni in Italy.

=== Formula 4 ===
After competing in other lower formulas, Nannini had the most success in the 2019 Formula 4 UAE Championship where he won seven races and won the title by 48 points over Joshua Dürksen.

=== FIA Formula 3 Championship ===
==== 2020 ====
In his second year of single-seater racing, Nannini moved up to the FIA Formula 3 Championship with Jenzer Motorsport. Nannini struggled throughout the first half of the season, claiming his first point score in Round 6 in Barcelona. He finished in tenth in the first race, which gave him reverse-grid pole. Nannini then managed to claim his first and only podium with a third place in the second race of the weekend. Nannini failed to score any points for the rest of the season and finished eighteenth overall in the championship with eleven points.

==== 2021 ====
Nannini returned to the series in 2021 with HWA Racelab. Nannini once again struggled, but not as badly as the previous season. He qualified fourth at the first round in Barcelona, and was fighting for the win in Race 2 before being caught up in a collision with Dennis Hauger, with Nannini retiring and Hauger finishing 25th. He bounced back with a third place finish in Race 3. At the first race in Spielberg, Nannini was fighting for the win with Clement Novalak before the pair of them collided at Turn 4, with Novalak retiring and Nannini finishing 23rd. Nannini took his first F3 win at Budapest in Race 2, where he overtook Roman Stanek at the start and Enzo Fittipaldi in the early stages of the race to go on and win comfortably. Afterwards he only got one more points finish, and finished fourteenth overall in the championship with 44 points, and was the highest placed HWA driver.

==== 2022 ====
Nannini joined ART Grand Prix for the second mid-season test at Barcelona, replacing Juan Manuel Correa who was out due to a foot injury. He was not called up to replace Correa for the next round at Imola, and ART only ran two cars there.

=== FIA Formula 2 Championship ===
Nannini was set to perform double duties in both F3 and Formula 2 in 2021, partnering Alessio Deledda at HWA Racelab.

In May 2021, Nannini announced he would be solely focusing on the Formula 3 championship after his sponsor ended support for a Formula 2 campaign. Williams Academy driver Jack Aitken replaced Nannini for the Monaco and Baku rounds. Nannini would return to the championship with Campos Racing, racing in Baku and Silverstone after Gianluca Petecof had left the team.

=== Stock car racing ===
On March 22, 2022, Team Stange Racing had announced that they would be returning to the ARCA Menards Series with their No. 46 car, which was last fielded in 2016, with Nannini driving it in the race at Mid-Ohio. This would have been his debut in a stock car. However, the team did not end up entering the race.

=== Indy NXT ===
==== 2023 ====
Nannini returned to full-time racing in 2023, driving for Juncos Hollinger Racing in the 2023 Indy NXT.

On July 18, 2023, it was announced Juncos Hollinger Racing and Nannini had parted ways effective immediately.

==== 2026 ====
After a two year hiatus from racing, Nannini returned to Indy NXT in 2026 with Cape Motorsports powered by ECR. Nannini won at Road America after Alessandro de Tullio was disqualified over a tire violation.

== Personal life ==
Nannini's father is a first cousin of former Formula One driver Alessandro Nannini and of singer Gianna Nannini.

Nannini founded a racing team called ENVE Motorsports in 2025.

== Karting record ==
=== Karting career summary ===
Season	Series	Team	Position
2009	Parolin Championkart — Delfino	Sprintkart	NC^{†}
2010	Parolin Championkart — Delfino	Sprintkart	NC^{†}
2011	Parolin Championkart — 50 Rocky	Sprintkart	5th
2011	Championkart International Final — Rocky	Sprintkart	5th
2012	Parolin Championkart — 50 Rocky	Sprintkart	3rd
2012	Championkart International Final — Rocky	Sprintkart	2nd
2013	Parolin Championkart — 60 Mini	Sprintkart	3rd
2013	Championkart International Final — Mini	Sprintkart	4th
2014	International Mini Academy — 60 Mini	Team Driver	2nd
2014	Trofeo Academy Championkart — 60 Mini	Team Driver	1st
2015	ROK Cup Italy — Junior ROK 125	RB	15th
2016	Trofeo dei Campioni — Junior ROK 125	KGT	1st
2016	ROK Cup Italy - Centro — Junior ROK	KGT	2nd
2016	ROK Cup Italy — Junior ROK 125	KGT	1st
2016	WSK Final Cup — OKJ	CRG SpA	NC
2016	CIK-FIA World Championship — OKJ	CRG SpA	53rd
2017	WSK Champions Cup — OK	CRG SpA	27th
2017	WSK Super Master Series — OK	Ricky Flynn Motorsport	41st
2017	CIK-FIA European Championship — OK	Ricky Flynn Motorsport	37th

^{†} As Nannini was a guest driver, he was ineligible to score points.

== Racing record ==
=== Racing career summary ===
Season	Series	Team	Races	Wins	Poles	F/Laps	Podiums	Points	Position
2019	F4 Spanish Championship	Xcel Motorsport	3	0	0	1	0	18	17th
2019	Formula 4 UAE Championship	Xcel Motorsport	20	7	6	7	16	363	**1st**
2019	Formula Renault Eurocup	MP Motorsport	2	0	0	0	0	0	NC†
2019	Formula Regional European Championship	Scuderia DF Corse by Corbetta	15	0	0	1	0	43	13rd
2020	FIA Formula 3 Championship	Jenzer Motorsport	18	0	0	0	1	11	18th
2020	Formula Regional European Championship	Monolite Racing	3	0	0	0	0	14	15th
2021	FIA Formula 2 Championship	HWA Racelab	3	0	0	0	0	1	22nd
2021	FIA Formula 2 Championship	Campos Racing	5	0	0	0	0	1	22nd
2021	FIA Formula 3 Championship	HWA Racelab	20	1	0	1	2	44	14th
2023	Indy NXT	Juncos Hollinger Racing	7	1	1	1	1	146	19th
2026	Indy NXT	Cape Motorsports Powered by ECR	17	2	1	0	2	362	12nd

^{†} As Nannini was a guest driver, he was ineligible for points.

=== Complete Formula 4 UAE Championship results ===
(key) (Races in bold indicate pole position; races in italics indicate fastest lap)

Year	Team	1	2	3	4	5	6	7	8	9	10	11	12	13	14	15	16	17	18	19	20	DC	Points
2019	Xcel Motorsport	**DUB1**; **1**; 1	DUB1; 2; 2	**DUB1**; **3**; 2	DUB1; 4; 5	YMC1; 1; 1	YMC1; 2; 3	YMC1; 3; 5	YMC1; 4; 1	**DUB2**; **1**; 2	DUB2; 2; 5	**DUB2**; **3**; 1	DUB2; 4; 3	**YMC2**; **1**; 1	YMC2; 2; 3	**YMC2**; **3**; 2	YMC2; 4; 1	DUB3; 1; 2	DUB3; 2; 8	DUB3; 3; 1	DUB3; 4; 3	1st	363

=== Complete F4 Spanish Championship results ===
(key) (Races in bold indicate pole position; races in italics indicate fastest lap)

Year	Team	1	2	3	4	5	6	7	8	9	10	11	12	13	14	15	16	17	18	19	20	21	DC	Points
2019	Xcel Motorsport	NAV; 1; 5	NAV; 2; 4	NAV; 3 Ret	LEC; 1	LEC; 2	LEC; 3	ARA; 1	ARA; 2	ARA; 3	CRT; 1	CRT; 2	CRT; 3	JER; 1	JER; 2	JER; 3	ALG; 1	ALG; 2	ALG; 3	CAT; 1	CAT; 2	CAT; 3	17th	18

=== Complete Formula Renault Eurocup results ===
(key) (Races in bold indicate pole position) (Races in italics indicate fastest lap)

Year	Team	1	2	3	4	5	6	7	8	9	10	11	12	13	14	15	16	17	18	19	20	Pos	Points
2019	MP Motorsport	MNZ; 1	MNZ; 2	SIL; 1	SIL; 2	MON; 1	MON; 2	LEC; 1	LEC; 2	SPA; 1	SPA; 2	NÜR; 1	NÜR; 2	HUN; 1	HUN; 2	CAT; 1	CAT; 2	HOC; 1	HOC; 2	YMC; 1; 10	YMC; 2; 5	NC†	0

† As Nannini was a guest driver, he was ineligible for points

=== Complete Formula Regional European Championship results ===
(key) (Races in bold indicate pole position; races in italics indicate fastest lap)

Year	Entrant	1	2	3	4	5	6	7	8	9	10	11	12	13	14	15	16	17	18	19	20	21	22	23	24	25	DC	Points
2019	Scuderia DF Corse by Corbetta	LEC; 1	LEC; 2	LEC; 3	VLL; 1; 10	VLL; 2; 10	VLL; 3 C	HUN; 1	HUN; 2	HUN; 3	RBR; 1; 8	RBR; 2; 8	RBR; 3; 11	IMO; 1; 6	IMO; 2; 6	IMO; 3; 9	IMO; 4; 9	CAT; 1; 6	CAT; 2; 10	CAT; 3; 9	MUG; 1; 11	MUG; 2; 7	MUG; 3; 11	MNZ; 1	MNZ; 2	MNZ; 3	13rd	43 (Note: Nannini was not eligible to classify or score points at Vallelunga due to age restrictions. This points restriction also included the Vallelunga make-up race at Imola.)
2020	Monolite Racing	MIS; 1	MIS; 2	MIS; 3	LEC; 1	LEC; 2	LEC; 3	RBR; 1	RBR; 2	RBR; 3	MUG; 1	MUG; 2	MUG; 3	MNZ; 1	MNZ; 2	MNZ; 3	CAT; 1; 9	CAT; 2; 8	CAT; 3; 6	IMO; 1	IMO; 2	IMO; 3	VLL; 1	VLL; 2	VLL; 3		15th	14

=== Complete FIA Formula 3 Championship results ===
(key) (Races in bold indicate pole position; races in italics indicate points for the fastest lap of top ten finishers)

Year	Entrant	1	2	3	4	5	6	7	8	9	10	11	12	13	14	15	16	17	18	19	20	21	DC	Points
2020	Jenzer Motorsport	RBR; FEA; 27	RBR; SPR; 18	RBR; FEA; 23	RBR; SPR; NC	HUN; FEA; 22	HUN; SPR; 24†	SIL; FEA; 24	SIL; SPR; 23	SIL; FEA; 27†	SIL; SPR; 16	CAT; FEA; 10	CAT; SPR; 3	SPA; FEA; 13	SPA; SPR; 26	MNZ; FEA; Ret	MNZ; SPR; 20	MUG; FEA; 16	MUG; SPR; 15				18th	11
2021	HWA Racelab	CAT; 1; 10	CAT; 2; 26†	CAT; 3; 3	LEC; 1; 22	LEC; 2; 13	LEC; 3; 20	RBR; 1; 23	RBR; 2; 12	RBR; 3; 5	HUN; 1; 10	HUN; 2; 1	HUN; 3; 25	SPA; 1; 19	SPA; 2 Ret	SPA; 3; 26	ZAN; 1; 17	ZAN; 2; 9	ZAN; 3; 28	SOC; 1; 16	SOC; 2 C	SOC; 3; 17	14th	44

^{†} Driver did not finish the race, but was classified as they completed more than 90% of the race distance.

=== Complete FIA Formula 2 Championship results ===
(key) (Races in bold indicate pole position) (Races in italics indicate points for the fastest lap of top ten finishers)

Year	Entrant	1	2	3	4	5	6	7	8	9	10	11	12	13	14	15	16	17	18	19	20	21	22	23	24	DC	Points
2021	HWA Racelab	BHR; SP1; 14	BHR; SP2; 9	BHR; FEA; 10	MCO; SP1	MCO; SP2	MCO; FEA																			22nd	1
2021	Campos Racing							BAK; SP1; 15	BAK; SP2; 11	BAK; FEA; DNS	SIL; SP1; 15	SIL; SP2; 14	SIL; FEA; 18	MNZ; SP1	MNZ; SP2	MNZ; FEA	SOC; SP1	SOC; SP2	SOC; FEA	JED; SP1	JED; SP2	JED; FEA	YMC; SP1	YMC; SP2	YMC; FEA	22nd	1

=== American open-wheel racing results ===
==== Indy NXT ====
(key) (Races in bold indicate pole position) (Races in italics indicate fastest lap) (Races with ^{L} indicate a race lap led) (Races with * indicate most race laps led)

Year	Team	1	2	3	4	5	6	7	8	9	10	11	12	13	14	15	16	17	Rank	Points
2023	Juncos Hollinger Racing	STP; 15	BAR; 15	**IMS**; 1^{L}*	DET; 14	DET; 11	RDA; 16	MOH; 17	IOW	NSH	IMS	GMP	POR	LAG	LAG				19th	146
2026	Cape Motorsports powered by ECR	STP; 19	ARL; 8	BAR; 15	BAR; 13	IMS; 23	IMS; 7	DET; 11	GAT; 20	ROA; 5	ROA; 1	MOH; 14	MOH; 12	**NSS**; 1^{L}*	POR; 20	MIL; 20	LAG; 11	LAG; 7	12nd	362

Sporting positions
Preceded by Charles Weerts	Formula 4 UAE Championship; Champion; 2019	Succeeded by Francesco Pizzi
