= General Authority of Youth and Sports Welfare =

The General Authority of Youth and Sports Welfare (GAYSW) is the supreme state-owned authority responsible for the welfare of youth and sports activities in the United Arab Emirates. It also oversees a number of institutions and youth centres in the seven Emirates.

== History ==
The Ministry of Youth and Sports was created when the UAE was founded in 1971. It was headed by Rashid Hamad bin Rahmah Al Shamsi until 1976, when the ministry was merged into the Ministry of Education. In 1999, the General Authority for Youth and Sports Welfare was set up, and Ali Abdul-Aziz Al Sharhan, then minister of education, was appointed as chairman. In 2006, the chairmanship of the GAYSW was shifted to Abdul Rahman Mohammed Al Owais, the Minister of Culture, Youth and Community Development, who served in this position until 2013. Since then, the chair has been Nahyan bin Mubarak Al Nahyan.

== Missions and roles of the GAYSW ==
The UAEGAYSW seeks to provide an attractive environment for Emirati young people to develop their physical and mental abilities, and to enhance a sense of Emirati identity, loyalty, belonging, and volunteering. The authority pays especial attention to sports development.

=== Youth sector ===
- Implementing government's policy regarding youth and making plans and projects for the achievement of such policies.
- Supervise youth organizations (including Scouts/Guides) and follow up and support their activities and evaluate their performance.
- Set up male and female youth centers and distribute them throughout the country on a geographic and population basis.
- Coordinate and cooperate with the national and international competent authorities through partnership agreements and memorandums of understanding.

=== Sports sector ===
- Implement the government's policy on competitive, recreational and traditional sports, and make plans and projects for the execution of such policies.
- Spread the culture of sports among the UAE social categories, to become "a way of life" and enable to fight against related diseases.
- Achieve outstanding results and represent the UAE regional, continental and international sportive events.
- Take the necessary measures in favor of disabled people and women in sports activities.

== Institutions and centers of the GAYSW ==
The UAE GAYSW oversees a number of institutions, including the eight youth centers in Sharjah, Ajman and Alghail, girls' centers in Umm Al Quwain, Al-Fujairah, Ras Al Khaimah, Falaj Mualla and Mirbah. Along with these centers, the GAYSW has youth associations and scientific clubs in cities like Al Fujairah and Ras Al Khaimah. The authority also supervises sports councils in Abu Dhabi and Sharjah, and sports committees, associations and federations in the country.
