= Automobile & Touring Club of the United Arab Emirates =

The Automobile & Touring Club of the United Arab Emirates (ATCUAE), is the sole Touring and Sporting representative of the Fédération Internationale de l'Automobile (FIA) in the UAE.

== History ==
One of the oldest national organizations in the United Arab Emirates, the ATCUAE was founded in 1965.

The ATCUAE is the country’s sole representative of the FIA, automobile sport's world governing body, and its motorcycling and karting equivalents, the Fédération Internationale de Motocyclisme (FIM) (in its guise as the UAE Motorcycle Club) and Commission Internationale de Karting (CIK) respectively. Its primary responsibilities are to promote the safe and sustainable growth of motorsport in the UAE, and to ensure all events are run fairly and to regulation.

Since its inception in 1965, the ATCUAE has played a leading role in the development of motorsport on both the national and international level. Today, it governs overs 120 competitive events forming the UAE motorsport calendar, and covering disciplines such as circuit racing, rallying, drag racing and motocross.

The organization is also a member of the Fédération Internationale des Véhicules Anciens (FIVA), the international body for classic vehicles, and the International Road Transport Union (IRU).

The ATCUAE is recognized by the United Arab Emirates National Olympic Committee.

== Governance ==
The Club President is Mohammed Ben Sulayem, 14 time FIA Middle East Rally Champion and one of the Arab world's most famous sportsmen, who took over in 2006.

Sheikh Mohammed Bin Rashid Al Maktoum, Vice President and Prime Minister of the UAE and Ruler of Dubai, is the organisations Honorary President.

== Commercial Operations ==
Under the authority of the FIA, the ATCUAE is the only body in the UAE licensed to issue Carnets de Passage (CPD) and International Driving Permits (IDP) for UAE citizens and residents.

== Motorsport Operations ==
As well as overseeing all motorsport events in the UAE, the ATCUAE is the owner and promoter of several events directly ...

The Abu Dhabi Desert Challenge was founded by Mohammed Ben Sulayem in 1991 and is the longest standing round of the FIA Cross Country Rally World Cup and the FIM Cross-Country Rallies World Championship. Over the years, it has been won by famous competitors such as Ari Vatanen, Stephane Peterhansel, Nasser Al Attiyah, Cyril Despres, Marc Coma and Toby Price.

The Dubai International Rally is the oldest motorsport event in the UAE and has been an ever present round of the FIA Middle East Rally Championship since it was formed in the early 1980s. Current ATCUAE President Mohammed Ben Sulayem holds the record for number of wins on the event at 15.

The ATCUAE is the promoter of the new Formula 4 UAE Championship due to begin in 2016-17.

In 2013, the ATCUAE founded the Emirates Desert Championship, the UAE national baja series for cars, buggies, motorcycles and quads. Beginning its 4th season in October 2016, the championship regularly attracts over 100 entries across all classes.
