= Glenn van Berlo =

Dutch racing driver

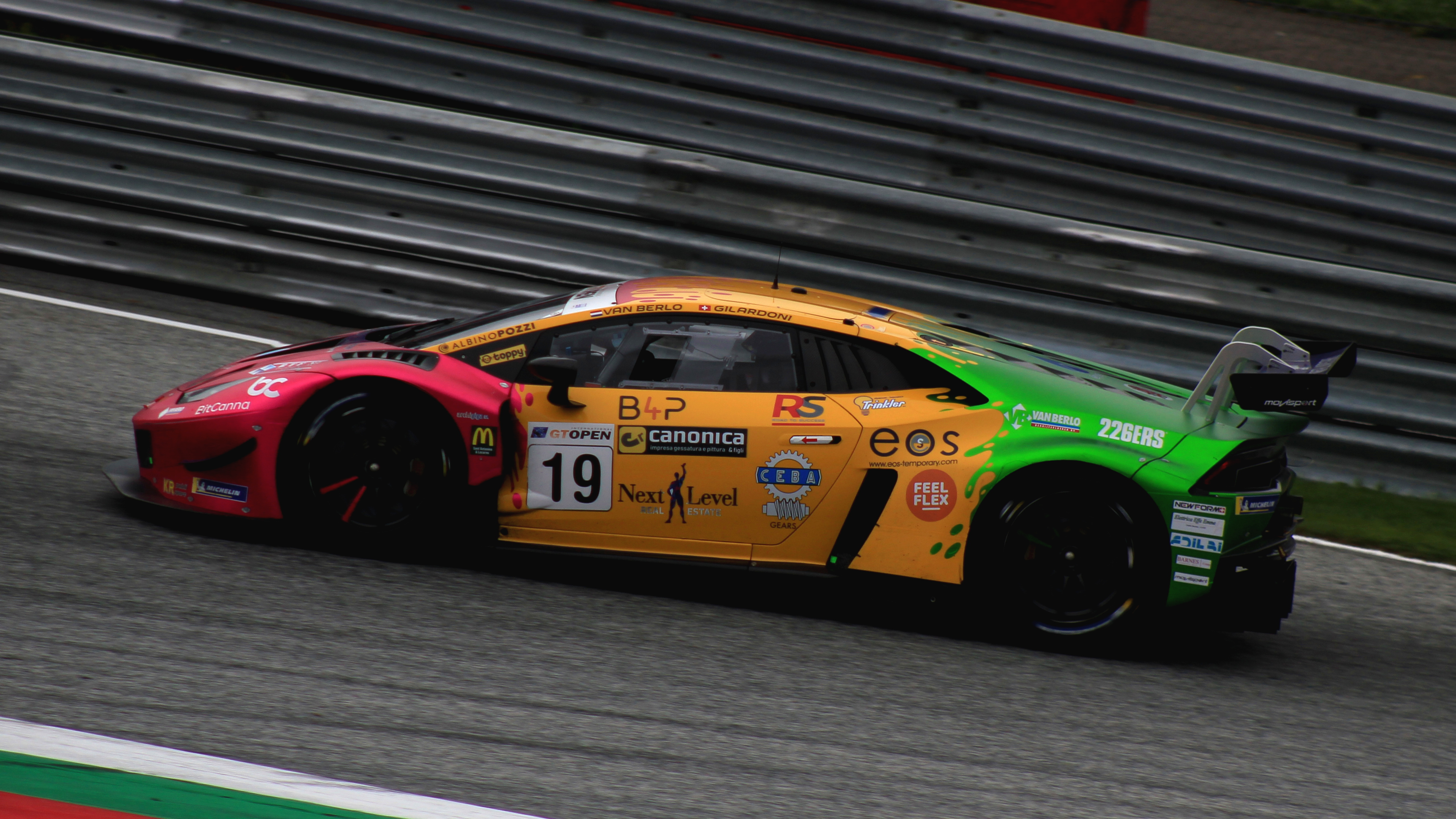
- Van Berlo in 2022
- Nationality: Netherlands
- Born: 21 January 2002 (age 24) Veghel, The Netherlands
- Relatives: Kay van Berlo (brother)

Lamborghini Super Trofeo Europe career
- Debut season: 2021
- Current team: Target Racing
- Categorisation: FIA Silver
- Car number: 41
- Starts: 4
- Wins: 0
- Poles: 0
- Fastest laps: 0

Previous series
- 2020 2019 2019 2018-19: Euroformula Open Championship; F4 Spanish Championship; Touring Car Endurance Series; MRF Challenge

Championship titles
- 2023: GT World Challenge Europe Endurance Cup - Silver Cup

Glenn van Berlo (born 21 January 2002) is a Dutch racing driver from Veghel currently racing for Target Racing in the Lamborghini Super Trofeo Europe.

== Career ==
=== Karting ===
Van Berlo started karting in 2011, where he drove in the Chrono Dutch Rotax Max Challenge. Before entering single seaters, he won karting titles such as the 2012 Chrono Dutch Rotax Max Challenge, and the BNL Karting Series.

=== Spanish F4 ===
In 2019, van Berlo stepped up to his first season in single seaters where he drove for MP Motorsport. In his first race he finished on the podium behind eventual champion Franco Colapinto and Omani Shihab Al Habsi. Throughout the season, van Berlo scored 222 points along with ten podiums and three wins, but fell short of the title behind Argentine Colapinto by 103 points and only missed out on second place by five points behind Spaniard Kilian Meyer.

=== Euroformula Open Championship ===
Van Berlo was announced to drive for Drivex in mid-February He competed full time, achieving a best finish of third at Spa-Francorchamps, and ended the season ninth in the standings.

=== Lamborghini Super Trofeo Europe ===
It was announced that van Berlo would switch to sportscars for 2021, sharing the Target Racing No. 41 car with Raul Guzman in the Lamborghini Super Trofeo Europe series.

=== GT World Challenge Europe ===
In 2023, van Berlo began competing full-time in the GT World Challenge Europe Endurance Cup. He joined co-drivers Benjamin Hites and Clemens Schmid in GRT Grasser Racing Team's No. 85 entry in the Silver Cup.

== Racing record ==
=== Career summary ===
Season	Series	Team	Races	Wins	Poles	F/Laps	Podiums	Points	Position
2018	24H GT Series - 911	Van Berlo Racing	1	0	0	0	0	N/A	NC†
2018–19	MRF Challenge Formula 2000 Championship	MRF Racing	5	0	0	0	0	12	13th
2019	Spanish F4 Championship	MP Motorsport	21	3	5	2	10	222	**3rd**
2019	24H TCE Series - SP3	Munckhof Racing	1	0	0	1	0	16	NC†
2020	Euroformula Open Championship	Drivex School	18	0	0	0	1	80	9th
2020	Dutch Winter Endurance Series	Snoexx Motorsport	1	0	0	0	0	5	48th
2021	Lamborghini Super Trofeo Europe	Target Racing	4	0	0	0	2	?	?
2021	GT World Challenge Europe Endurance Cup	Vincenzo Sospiri Racing	1	0	0	0	0	0	NC†
2021	24H GT Series - 991	Bas Koeten Racing							
2022	European Le Mans Series - LMP3	Eurointernational	4	0	0	0	0	22	14th
2022	International GT Open	Oregon Team	13	3	0	0	6	119	**3rd**
2022	24H GT Series - 991	Van Berlo Motorsport by Bas Koeten Racing							
2023	GT World Challenge Europe Endurance Cup	GRT Grasser Racing Team	4	0	0	0	0	0	NC
2023	GT World Challenge Europe Endurance Cup - Silver Cup	GRT Grasser Racing Team	4	2	3	2	4	116	**1st**
2023	European Le Mans Series - LMP3	Eurointernational	4	0	0	0	0	1	14th
2023	IMSA SportsCar Championship - LMP3	Riley Motorsports	1	0	0	0	0	810	18th
2023	IMSA SportsCar Championship - LMP3	Andretti Autosport	3	0	2	0	0	810	18th
2024	GT Winter Series - Cup2	Plusline Racing Team							
2024	Prototype Winter Series - Class 3	Konrad Motorsport	2	2	1	0	2	18.34	6th
2024	GT World Challenge Europe Endurance Cup	Tresor Attempto Racing	1	0	0	0	0	0	NC
2024	Italian GT Endurance Championship - GT3	Tresor Audi Sport Italia	4	0	0	0	1	31	8th
2024	USF Pro 2000 Championship	Pabst Racing	4	0	0	0	0	50	22nd
2025	24H Series - 992	Van Berlo Motorsport by Bas Koeten Racing							
2025	992 Endurance Cup	Van Berlo Motorsport by Bas Koeten Racing							
2026	24H Series - 992	Van Berlo Motorsport by CP Motorsport							

^{†} As van Berlo was a guest driver, he was ineligible for championship points.
^{*} Season still in progress.

=== Complete MRF Challenge Formula 2000 Championship results ===
(key) (Races in bold indicate pole position) (Races in italics indicate fastest lap)

Year	1	2	3	4	5	6	7	8	9	10	11	12	13	14	15	DC	Points
2018-19	DUB; 1	DUB; 2	DUB; 3	DUB; 4	DUB; 5	BHR; 1	BHR; 2	BHR; 3	BHR; 4	BHR; 5	CHE; 1; 10	CHE; 2; 8	CHE; 3; 10	CHE; 4; 8	CHE; 5; 9	13th	12

=== Complete F4 Spanish Championship results ===
(key) (Races in bold indicate pole position) (Races in italics indicate fastest lap)

Year	Team	1	2	3	4	5	6	7	8	9	10	11	12	13	14	15	16	17	18	19	20	21	DC	Points
2019	MP Motorsport	NAV; 1; 3	NAV; 2; 5	NAV; 3 Ret	LEC; 1; 3	LEC; 2; 5	LEC; 3; 5	ARA; 1; 4	ARA; 2 Ret	ARA; 3; 12	CRT; 1; 5	**CRT**; **2** Ret	**CRT**; **3**; 2	**JER**; **1**; 1	**JER**; **2**; 1	JER; 3; 2	ALG; 1 Ret	ALG; 2; 2	ALG; 3; 1	CAT; 1; 3	CAT; 2; 5	**CAT**; **3**; 2	3rd	222

=== Complete Euroformula Open Championship results ===
(key) (Races in bold indicate pole position) (Races in italics indicate fastest lap)

Year	Team	1	2	3	4	5	6	7	8	9	10	11	12	13	14	15	16	17	18	Pos	Points
2020	Drivex School	HUN; 1; 9	HUN; 2; 9	LEC; 1; 9	LEC; 2; 10	RBR; 1; 7	RBR; 2; 5	MNZ; 1; 9	MNZ; 2; 8	MNZ; 3; 9	MUG; 1; 7	MUG; 2; 8	SPA; 1 (10)	SPA; 2; 3	SPA; 3; 6	CAT; 1; 6	CAT; 2; 6	CAT; 3; 11	CAT; 4 Ret	9th	80

=== Complete International GT Open results ===
(key) (Races in bold indicate pole position; results in italics indicate fastest lap)

Year	Entrant	Class	Chassis	1	2	3	4	5	6	7	8	9	10	11	12	13	Rank	Points
2022	Oregon Team	Pro	Lamborghini Huracán GT3 Evo	EST; 1; 3	EST; 2; 4	LEC; 1; 4	LEC; 2; 2	SPA; 3	HUN; 1; 4	HUN; 2; 1	RBR; 1; 1	RBR; 2; 8	MNZ; 1; 7	MNZ; 2 Ret	CAT; 1; 7	CAT; 2; 1	3rd	119

=== Complete European Le Mans Series results ===
(key) (Races in bold indicate pole position; results in italics indicate fastest lap)

Year	Entrant	Class	Chassis	Engine	1	2	3	4	5	6	Rank	Points
2022	Eurointernational	LMP3	Duqueine M30 - D08	Nissan VK56DE 5.6L V8	LEC; 4	IMO; Ret	MNZ; Ret	CAT; 5	SPA	ALG	14th	22
2023	EuroInternational	LMP3	Ligier JS P320	Nissan VK56DE 5.6 L V8	CAT; Ret	LEC; 10	ARA; Ret	SPA; Ret	PRT	ALG	14th	1

=== Complete WeatherTech SportsCar Championship results ===
(key) (Races in bold indicate pole position; races in italics indicate fastest lap)

Year	Entrant	Class	Make	Engine	1	2	3	4	5	6	7	Rank	Points
2023	Riley Motorsports	LMP3	Ligier JS P320	Nissan VK56DE 5.6 L V8	DAY; 9	**SEB**; **9**	WGL; 4	MOS	ELK	IMS	**PET**; **7**	17th	810

=== Complete American open–wheel racing results ===
==== USF Pro 2000 Championship ====
(key) (Races in bold indicate pole position) (Races in italics indicate fastest lap) (Races with * indicate most race laps led)

Year	Team	1	2	3	4	5	6	7	8	9	10	11	12	13	14	15	16	17	18	Rank	Points
2024	Pabst Racing	STP; 1	STP; 2	LOU; 1	LOU; 2	LOU; 3	IMS; 1	IMS; 2	IMS; 3	IRP	ROA; 1	ROA; 2	ROA; 3	MOH; 1	MOH; 2	TOR; 1; 15	TOR; 2; 11	POR; 1; 5	POR; 2; 5	22nd	50
