= 2023 Petit Le Mans =

Sportscar endurance race in Georgia, US

The Track map of Road Atlanta

The 2023 Petit Le Mans (known as the 2023 MOTUL Petit Le Mans for sponsorship reasons) was the 26th running of the Petit Le Mans, and was held on October 14, 2023. The event was the 11th and final round in the 2023 IMSA SportsCar Championship, and the fourth round of the 2023 Michelin Endurance Cup. The race was held at Road Atlanta in Braselton, Georgia.

Wayne Taylor Racing with Andretti Autosport began from pole position after Louis Delétraz set the fastest lap in the GTP class. The lead was exchanged several times between the Cadillac Racing, WTR, Whelen Engineering Racing, Meyer Shank Racing, and Porsche Penske Motorsport teams. Braun, Blomqvist, and Castroneves took victory in the No. 60 Meyer Shank Racing Acura ARX-06. Cadillac Racing's Sébastien Bourdais, Scott Dixon, and Renger van der Zande finished in second, and Gianmaria Bruni, Harry Tincknell, and Neel Jani of Proton Competition recovered from a late race spin to finish third.

The CrowdStrike Racing by APR team of Ben Hanley, George Kurtz, and Nolan Siegel won the Le Mans Prototype 2 (LMP2) category with the TDS Racing Oreca 07 car of John Falb, Josh Pierson, and Giedo van der Garde in second. In the final Le Mans Prototype 3 (LMP3) race in the IMSA SportsCar Championship, the No. 30 JR III Motorsports Ligier JS P320 of Bijoy Garg, Nolan Siegel, and Garett Grist won the category. WeatherTech Racing won the GTD Pro class with a Mercedes-AMG GT3 Evo driven by Maro Engel, Jules Gounon, and Daniel Juncadella. The Forte Racing powered by US RaceTronics team of Misha Goikhberg, Patrick Liddy, and Loris Spinelli won the GTD class in a Lamborghini Huracán GT3 Evo 2.

The result meant Derani and Sims won the GTP Drivers' Championship by 21 points over Filipe Albuquerque and Ricky Taylor. Colin Braun and Tom Blomqvist of the Meyer Shank Racing with Curb-Agajanian team finished third ahead of Campbell and Nasr in fourth. Lexus' Ben Barnicoat and Jack Hawksworth finished eighth in GTD Pro to claim the GTD Pro Drivers' Championship with 3760 points. GTD Pro class race winners Juncadella and Gounon passed Antonio García and Jordan Taylor to end the season in second place.

== Background ==
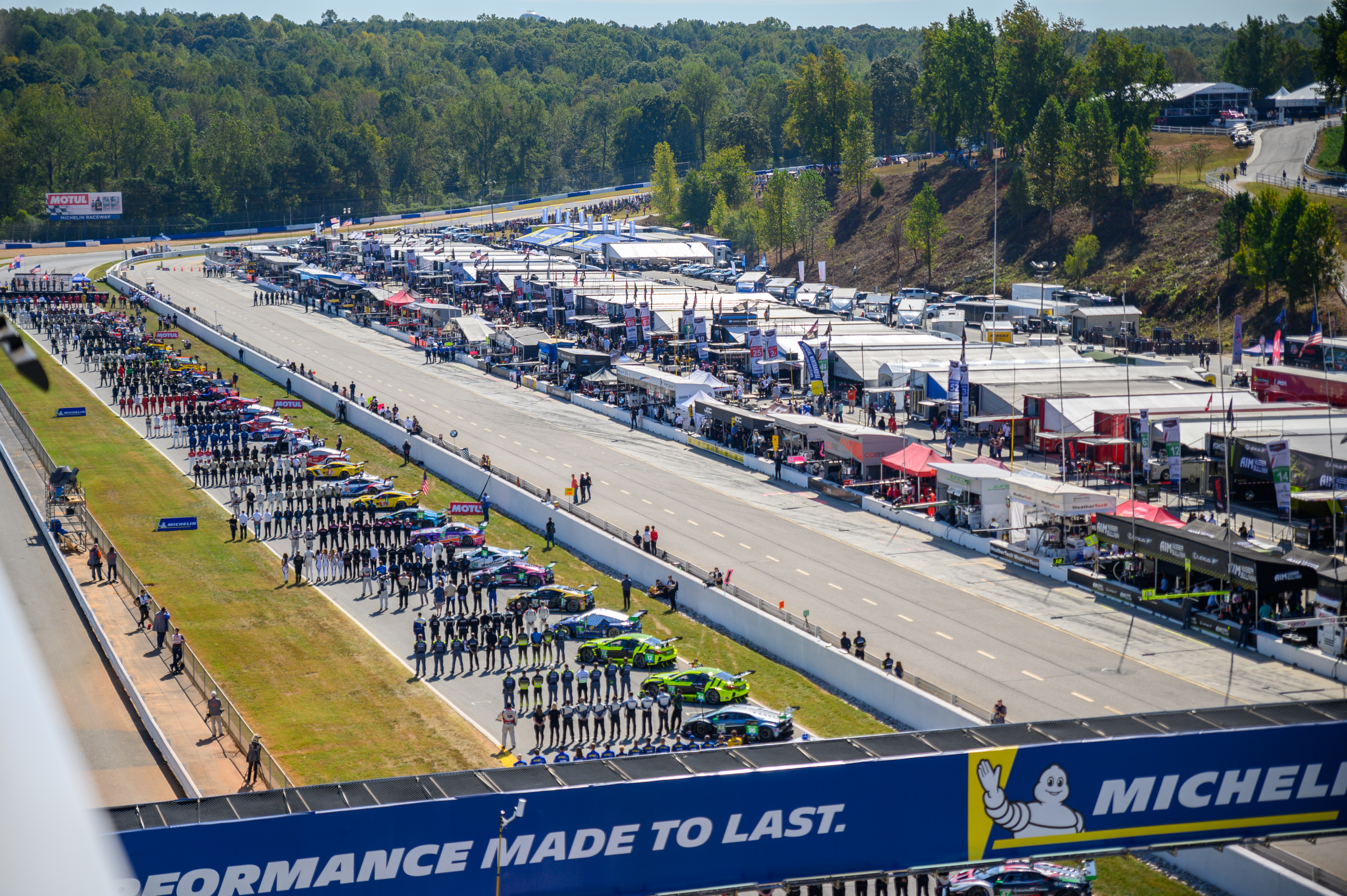
Michelin Raceway Road Atlanta, where the race was held.

International Motor Sports Association's (IMSA) president John Doonan confirmed the race was part of the schedule for the 2023 IMSA SportsCar Championship (IMSA SCC) in August 2022. The 2023 Petit Le Mans was the last of eleven scheduled sports car races of 2023 by IMSA, and it was the fourth round held as part of the Michelin Endurance Cup. The race took place at the 12-turn, 2.540-mile (4.088 km) Road Atlanta in Braselton, Georgia on October 14, 2023.

As the final race of the 2023 season, the race marked the final appearance for the LMP3 class. The Chevrolet Corvette C8.R also entered its final IMSA event, ahead of the switch to new GT3 machinery for Chevrolet in 2024.

This would be the final race for entry for Jr III Motorsports after team principle Billy Glavin was appointed general manager for United Autosports. It was the final IMSA appearance for Meyer Shank Racing as a result of pausing their sports car effort. Corvette Racing also entered their final IMSA race as General Motors will solely focus on customer teams with the new Chevrolet Corvette Z06 GT3.R.

On October 9, 2023, IMSA released the latest technical bulletin outlining Balance of Performance for the GTP, GTD Pro, and GTD classes. In GTP, The Acura ARX-06 received a 1 kilogram weight break while the BMW M Hybrid V8, Cadillac V-Series.R, and Porsche 963 received a small power increase. In GTD Pro and GTD, the Ferrari 296 GT3 received a 20 kilogram weight increase and a fuel capacity increase of 1 liter. In contrast, the Lamborghini Huracán GT3 Evo 2 and Mercedes-AMG GT3 Evo were made 15 kilograms heavier. The BMW M4 GT3 received an increase of 4.4 horsepower and a fuel capacity decrease of 1 liter. The Acura NSX GT3 Evo22 received a fuel capacity decrease of 1 liter while the Chevrolet Corvette C8.R GTD and Porsche 911 GT3 R (992) received 1 extra liter of fuel capacity.

Heading into the final race of the season, Pipo Derani and Alexander Sims were leading the GTP Drivers' Championship with 2460 points, 3 ahead of Filipe Albuquerque and Ricky Taylor in second with 2457 points, and Nick Tandy and Mathieu Jaminet a further 2 points behind in third. Connor De Phillippi and Nick Yelloly were fourth on 2422 points while Matt Campbell and Felipe Nasr were a further 35 points behind in fifth. Tom Blomqvist and Colin Braun were also in mathematical contention on 2333 points, 127 points behind Derani and Sims with a maximum of 385 points available for the final race weekend. In LMP2, Mikkel Jensen and Steven Thomas led the Drivers' Championship with 1680 points, ahead of Paul-Loup Chatin and Ben Keating with 1660 points followed by Ben Hanley and George Kurtz in third with 1580 points. With 1838 points, Gar Robinson led the LMP3 Drivers' Championship, 294 points ahead of Wayne Boyd and Anthony Mantella. Robinson needed to start the race to claim the title. Ben Barnicoat and Jack Hawksworth led the GTD Pro Drivers' Championship with 3495 points, 188 points ahead of Antonio García and Jordan Taylor. Barnicoat and Hawksworth needed to start the race to claim the title. With 3331 points, Bryan Sellers and Madison Snow had secured the GTD Drivers' Championship at the previous round, the IMSA Battle on the Bricks. The duo led by 405 points ahead of Roman De Angelis and Marco Sørensen in second. Porsche, Lexus, and BMW were leading their respective Manufacturers' Championships, while Whelen Engineering Racing, TDS Racing, Riley Motorsports, Vasser Sullivan Racing, and Paul Miller Racing each led their own Teams' Championships.

=== Entries ===
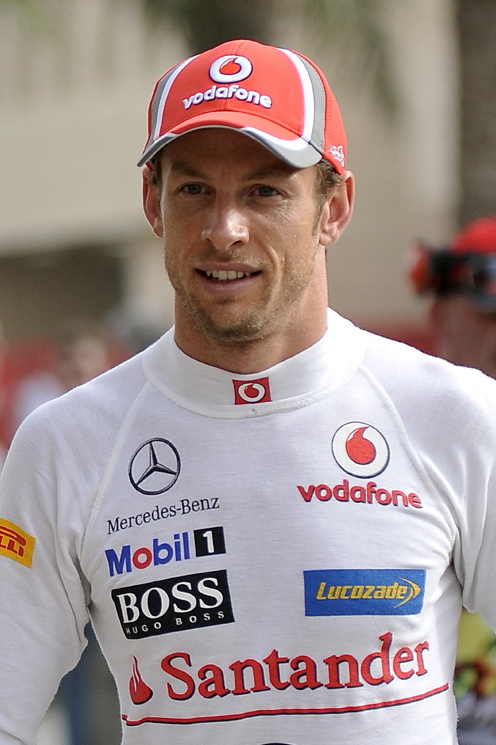
Jenson Button (pictured in 2012) made his first IMSA appearance.

A total of 52 cars took part in the event split across five classes. 10 cars were entered in GTP, 8 in LMP2, 7 in LMP3, 8 in GTD Pro, and 19 in GTD. In GTP, Jensen Button joined Tijmen van der Helm and Mike Rockenfeller in the No. 5 JDC-Miller MotorSports entry. Laurens Vanthoor joined in the No. 6 Porsche Penske Motorsport while Josef Newgarden will join in the sister No. 7 entry. Scott Dixon continued in his endurance role for Cadillac Racing, as did Louis Delétraz, Marco Wittmann, Sheldon van der Linde, Jack Aitken, and Hélio Castroneves for Wayne Taylor Racing with Andretti Autosport, BMW M Team RLL, Whelen Engineering Racing, and Meyer Shank Racing, respectively. Neel Jani joined Proton Competition. In LMP2, AF Corse made their first appearance since the Watkins Glen round. Rick Ware Racing withdrew from the event. John Falb returned to the No. 35 TDS Racing entry. Scott McLaughlin rejoined Tower Motorsports. In LMP3, Andretti Autosport and JDC-Miller MotorSports returned. Bijoy Garg joined Garett Grist and Nolan Siegel in the No. 30 Jr III Motorsports entry. Sean Creech Motorsport withdrew from the event due to a family emergency for Lance Willsey. In GTD Pro, AF Corse and Risi Competizione made their first appearances since the Watkins Glen round. Kévin Estre joined Pfaff Motorsports. In GTD, Kelly-Moss with Riley scaled down to one car due to Alan Metni being injured. Iron Dames, Triarsi Competizione, Magnus Racing, Cetilar Racing, and the No. 16 Wright Motorsports entry returned as a part of their Michelin Endurance Cup campaigns. Thomas Merrill joined Bill Auberlen and Chandler Hull in the No. 97 Turner Motorsport entry. Lone Star Racing and Andretti Autosport were absent.

== Practice ==
There were three practice sessions preceding the start of the race on Saturday, all three one on Thursday. The first session on Thursday morning lasted 90 minutes. The second session on Thursday afternoon lasted 105 minutes. The final session on Thursday evening lasted 90 minutes.

In the first practice session, Sébastien Bourdais topping the charts for Cadillac Racing, with a lap time of 1:11.674. Mathieu Jaminet was second fastest in the No. 6 Porsche Penske Motorsport entry followed by Matt Campbell in the No. 7 Porsche. Ben Hanley set the fastest lap in LMP2 with a time of 1:13.919, followed by Alex Quinn's No. 52 PR1/Mathiasen Motorsports car. Garett Grist was fastest in LMP3 with a time of 1:16.732. The GTD Pro class was topped by the No. 79 WeatherTech Racing Mercedes-AMG GT3 Evo of Jules Gounon with a time of 1:20.279. Mirko Bortolotti in the No. 63 Lamborghini was second fastest followed by Alessandro Pier Guidi in the No. 62 Ferrari. Bill Auberlen set the fastest time in GTD. The session was red flagged twice. 30 minutes into the session, Antonio Fuoco, driving the No. 47 Ferrari, spun at turn one and hit the tire barriers. The car sustained heavy rear-end damage. The final stoppage came when Jonathan Woolridge's No. 38 Ligier made contact with the No. 6 Porsche Penske Motorsport Porsche 963 of Laurens Vanthoor at turn three causing debris to be scattered on to the circuit.

The second practice session saw Bourdais topping the charts for Cadillac Racing, with a lap time of 1:09.671, ahead of Augusto Farfus in the No. 24 BMW. Scott Huffaker set the fastest lap in LMP2 with a time of 1:13.357, followed by Paul-Loup Chatin's No. 52 PR1/Mathiasen Motorsports car. Garett Grist was fastest in LMP3 with a time of 1:16.749. The GTD Pro class was topped by the No. 3 Corvette Racing Chevrolet Corvette C8.R GTD of Antonio García with a time of 1:19.543. Daniel Serra in the No. 62 Ferrari was second fastest followed by Jack Hawksworth in the No. 14 Lexus. Madison Snow set the fastest time in GTD. The session saw one stoppage when Giedo van der Garde driving the No. 35 TDS Racing car, crashed at turn three.

Filipe Albuquerque led the last practice session for Wayne Taylor Racing with Andretti Autosport, with a lap time of 1:11.299. Tom Blomqvist was second fastest in the No. 60 MSR Acura followed by Matt Campbell in the No. 7 Porsche Penske Motorsport entry. Mikkel Jensen was fastest in LMP2 with a time of 1:12.833, followed by Paul-Loup Chatin's No. 52 PR1/Mathiasen Motorsports car. Nicolás Varrone set the fastest lap in LMP3 with a time of 1:16.846. The GTD Pro class was topped by the No. 63 Iron Lynx Lamborghini Huracán GT3 Evo 2 of Mirko Bortolotti with a time of 1:19.803. Jules Gounon in the No. 79 Mercedes-AMG was second fastest followed by Jack Hawksworth in the No. 14 Lexus. Auberlen set the fastest time in GTD.

== Qualifying ==
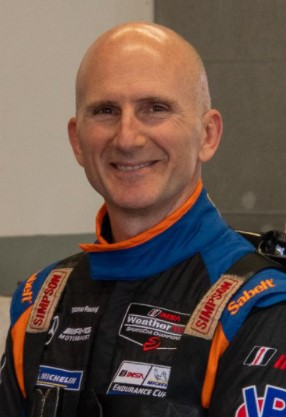
Ben Keating set the fastest overall lap time in qualifying.

Friday's afternoon qualifying was broken into three sessions, with one session for the GTP, LMP2 and LMP3, GTD Pro and GTD classes, which lasted for 20 minutes for the GTP session, and 15 minutes for the LMP2/LMP3, and GTD Pro/GTD sessions. The rules dictated that all teams nominated a driver to qualify their cars, with the Pro-Am LMP2 class requiring a Bronze rated driver to qualify the car while the LMP3 class required a Bronze/Silver Rated driver to qualify the car. The competitors' fastest lap times determined the starting order. IMSA then arranged the grid to put GTPs ahead of the LMP2, LMP3, GTD Pro, and GTD cars.

Rain fell and the track was damp. The first was for cars in the GTD Pro and GTD classes. Jack Hawksworth qualified on pole in GTD Pro driving the No. 14 car for Vasser Sullivan Racing. Mirko Bortolotti had set the second fastest time, but had all his laps deleted after getting out of the No. 63 Iron Lynx Lamborghini before the session ended. Antonio García in the No. 3 Corvette was promoted to second followed by Jules Gounon in the WeatherTech Racing entry. Ian James set the fastest time amongst all GTD cars driving the No. 27 car for Heart of Racing Team, 0.052 seconds faster than GTD Pro pole sitter Hawksworth. James was over six-tenths clear of Doriane Pin in the No. 83 Lamborghini followed by Aaron Telitz in the No. 12 Lexus.

The second session was for cars in the LMP2 and LMP3 classes. Ben Keating's No. 52 PR1/Mathiasen Motorsports Oreca was fastest overall, lapping at 1 minute, 13.859 seconds, beating Steven Thomas in the No. 11 TDS Racing entry by 0.020 seconds. John Falb was third in the sister No. 35 TDS Racing Oreca followed by George Kurtz in the No. 04 CrowdStrike Racing car, and François Perrodo rounded out the top five. Glenn van Berlo's No. 36 Andretti Autosport Ligier was fifteenth overall and the fastest LMP3 class car with a 1-minute, 16.674 seconds lap. Rasmus Lindh's No. 85 JDC-Miller MotorSports Duqueine was second and Bijoy Garg's No. 30 Jr III Motorsports Ligier was third.

The final session of qualifying was for the GTP class. Louis Delétraz in the No. 10 Wayne Taylor Racing Acura was sixth overall and would start from pole position with a lap time of 1 minute, 15.402 seconds. Delétraz was over two-tenths clear of Sébastien Bourdais in the No. 01 Cadillac followed by Augusto Farfus in the No. 24 BMW M Team RLL entry. Filipe Albuquerque and Ricky Taylor took the lead of the GTP Drivers' Championship by nine points over Derani and Sims.

=== Qualifying results ===
Pole positions in each class are indicated in bold and by ‡.

| Pos. | Class | No. | Team | Driver | Time | Gap | Grid |
|---|---|---|---|---|---|---|---|
| 1 | **LMP2** | **52** | **(United States) PR1/Mathiasen Motorsports** | **(United States) Ben Keating** | **1:13.859** | **_** | 11‡ |
| 2 | LMP2 | 11 | (France) TDS Racing | (United States) Steven Thomas | 1:13.879 | +0.020 | 12 |
| 3 | LMP2 | 35 | (France) TDS Racing | (United States) John Falb | 1:14.380 | +0.521 | 13 |
| 4 | LMP2 | 04 | (United States) CrowdStrike Racing by APR | (United States) George Kurtz | 1:14.547 | +0.688 | 14 |
| 5 | LMP2 | 88 | (Italy) AF Corse | (France) François Perrodo | 1:15.157 | +1.298 | 15 |
| 6 | **GTP** | **10** | **(United States) Wayne Taylor Racing with Andretti Autosport** | **(Switzerland) Louis Delétraz** | **1:15.402** | **+1.543** | 1‡ |
| 7 | LMP2 | 20 | (Denmark) High Class Racing | (Denmark) Dennis Andersen | 1:15.547 | +1.688 | 16 |
| 8 | LMP2 | 8 | (United States) Tower Motorsports | (United States) Ari Balogh | 1:15.559 | +1.700 | 17 |
| 9 | GTP | 01 | (United States) Cadillac Racing | (France) Sébastien Bourdais | 1:15.632 | +1.773 | 2 |
| 10 | GTP | 24 | (United States) BMW M Team RLL | (Brazil) Augusto Farfus | 1:15.731 | +1.872 | 3 |
| 11 | LMP2 | 18 | (United States) Era Motorsport | (United States) Dwight Merriman | 1:15.771 | +1.912 | 18 |
| 12 | GTP | 60 | (United States) Meyer Shank Racing with Curb-Agajanian | (United Kingdom) Tom Blomqvist | 1:15.847 | +1.988 | 4 |
| 13 | GTP | 6 | (Germany) Porsche Penske Motorsport | (United Kingdom) Nick Tandy | 1:16.219 | +2.360 | 5 |
| 14 | GTP | 25 | (United States) BMW M Team RLL | (United States) Connor De Phillippi | 1:16.371 | +2.512 | 6 |
| 15 | **LMP3** | **36** | **(United States) Andretti Autosport** | **(Netherlands) Glenn van Berlo** | **1:16.674** | **+2.815** | 19‡ |
| 16 | LMP3 | 85 | (United States) JDC-Miller MotorSports | (Sweden) Rasmus Lindh | 1:16.803 | +2.944 | 20 |
| 17 | GTP | 7 | (Germany) Porsche Penske Motorsport | (Brazil) Felipe Nasr | 1:16.860 | +3.001 | 7 |
| 18 | LMP3 | 30 | (United States) Jr III Motorsports | (United States) Bijoy Garg | 1:16.947 | +3.088 | 21 |
| 19 | GTP | 31 | (United States) Whelen Engineering Racing | (Brazil) Pipo Derani | 1:17.657 | +3.798 | 8 |
| 20 | GTP | 5 | (United States) JDC-Miller MotorSports | (Germany) Mike Rockenfeller | 1:18.204 | +4.345 | 9 |
| 21 | LMP3 | 13 | (Canada) AWA | (Canada) Orey Fidani | 1:19.693 | +5.834 | 22 |
| 22 | **GTD** | **27** | **(United States) Heart of Racing Team** | **(United Kingdom) Ian James** | **1:23.116** | **+9.257** | 26‡ |
| 23 | **GTD Pro** | **14** | **(United States) Vasser Sullivan Racing** | **(United Kingdom) Jack Hawksworth** | **1:23.168** | **+9.309** | 27‡ |
| 24 | GTD | 83 | (Italy) Iron Dames | (France) Doriane Pin | 1:23.795 | +9.936 | 28 |
| 25 | GTD | 12 | (United States) Vasser Sullivan Racing | (United States) Aaron Telitz | 1:23.847 | +9.988 | 29 |
| 26 | GTD | 97 | (United States) Turner Motorsport | (United States) Bill Auberlen | 1:24.036 | +10.177 | 30 |
| 27 | GTD Pro | 3 | (United States) Corvette Racing | (Spain) Antonio García | 1:24.099 | +10.240 | 31 |
| 28 | GTD | 57 | (United States) Winward Racing | (United Kingdom) Philip Ellis | 1:24.151 | +10.292 | 32 |
| 29 | GTD Pro | 79 | (United States) WeatherTech Racing | (Andorra) Jules Gounon | 1:24.220 | +10.361 | 33 |
| 30 | GTD Pro | 9 | (Canada) Pfaff Motorsports | (France) Patrick Pilet | 1:24.287 | +10.428 | 34 |
| 31 | GTD Pro | 62 | (United States) Risi Competizione | (Brazil) Daniel Serra | 1:24.419 | +10.560 | 35 |
| 32 | GTD | 66 | (United States) Gradient Racing | (United Kingdom) Katherine Legge | 1:24.760 | +10.901 | 36 |
| 33 | GTD | 70 | (United Kingdom) Inception Racing | (United States) Brendan Iribe | 1:24.797 | +10.938 | 37 |
| 34 | GTD Pro | 23 | (United States) Heart of Racing Team | (Spain) Alex Riberas | 1:25.047 | +11.188 | 38 |
| 35 | GTD | 80 | (United States) AO Racing Team | (United Kingdom) Sebastian Priaulx | 1:25.080 | +11.221 | 52^{1} |
| 36 | GTD | 93 | (United States) Racers Edge Motorsports with WTR Andretti | (Canada) Kyle Marcelli | 1:25.088 | +11.229 | 39 |
| 37 | GTD | 1 | (United States) Paul Miller Racing | (United States) Madison Snow | 1:25.123 | +11.264 | 40 |
| 38 | GTD Pro | 61 | (Italy) AF Corse | (Spain) Miguel Molina | 1:25.131 | +11.272 | 41 |
| 39 | GTD | 78 | (United States) Forte Racing powered by US RaceTronics | (Canada) Misha Goikhberg | 1:25.529 | +11.670 | 42 |
| 40 | GTD | 32 | (United States) Korthoff Preston Motorsports | (United States) Mike Skeen | 1:25.533 | +11.674 | 43 |
| 41 | GTD | 47 | (Italy) Cetilar Racing | (Italy) Antonio Fuoco | 1:25.535^{2} | +11.676 | 44 |
| 42 | GTD | 16 | (United States) Wright Motorsports | (Canada) Zacharie Robichon | 1:25.569 | +11.710 | 45 |
| 43 | GTD | 96 | (United States) Turner Motorsport | (United States) Michael Dinan | 1:25.733 | +11.874 | 46 |
| 44 | GTD | 77 | (United States) Wright Motorsports | (United States) Alan Brynjolfsson | 1:26.060 | +12.201 | 47 |
| 45 | GTD | 023 | (United States) Triarsi Competizione | (United States) Charlie Scardina | 1:27.718 | +13.859 | 48 |
| 46 | GTD | 44 | (United States) Magnus Racing | (United States) John Potter | 1:27.758 | +13.899 | 49 |
| 47 | LMP3 | 17 | (Canada) AWA | (Canada) Anthony Mantella | 1:36.721 | +22.862 | 23 |
| 48 | LMP3 | 38 | (United States) Performance Tech Motorsports | No time^{3} | | | 25 |
| 49 | GTP | 59 | (Germany) Proton Competition | (Switzerland) Neel Jani | No time^{4} | | 10 |
| 50 | GTD Pro | 63 | (Italy) Iron Lynx | (Italy) Mirko Bortolotti | No time^{5} | | 52 |
| 51 | LMP3 | 74 | (United States) Riley Motorsports | Did not participate | | | 24 |
| 52 | GTD | 92 | (United States) Kelly-Moss with Riley | Did not participate | | | 51 |
Sources:

- ^{1} The No. 80 AO Racing Team entry was moved to the back of the GTD field for starting the race with a different driver than who qualified.
- ^{2} The No. 47 Cetilar Racing entry had its four fastest laps deleted after failing to adhere to boost control requirements.
- ^{3} The No. 38 Performance Tech Motorsports entry had all qualifying laps forfeited after Cameron Shields got out of the car before the session ended.
- ^{4} The No. 59 Proton Competition entry had all qualifying laps forfeited due to the team making unapproved work on the car.
- ^{5} The No. 63 Iron Lynx entry had all qualifying laps forfeited after Mirko Bortolotti got out of the car before the session ended.

== Warm-up ==
A 20-minute warm up session was held on the morning of October 14. Felipe Nasr lapped fastest with a time of 1:20.007, 1.082 seconds faster than Harry Tincknell in the No. 59 Porsche. Anders Fjordbach led LMP2 while Rasmus Lindh was fastest in LMP3. The fastest GTD Pro lap was a 1:28.320, set by Daniel Serra in the No. 62 Ferrari, and Danny Formal's No. 93 Acura set the fastest time amongst all GTD cars.

== Race ==
=== Start and early hours ===
The air temperature throughout the race was between 65 and 76 °F (18 and 24 °C) and the track temperature ranged from 75 to 114 °F (24 to 46 °C). There were 52 cars scheduled to start, but the No. 85 JDC-Miller MotorSports Duqueine was in the garage for repairs after Rasmus Lindh crashed on the formation lap. Bourdais took the lead from Delétraz at turn one while one incident further down the field necessitated the first safety car intervention. Ari Balogh crashed the No. 8 Tower Motorsports Oreca in turn 6 coming to the green at the start of the race and then crashed once again on lap two in turn 3. and would not return for the next 40 minutes. By crossing the start finish line, Robinson clinched the LMP3 Drivers' Championship while Barnicoat and Hawksworth took the GTD Pro Drivers' Championship. When racing resumed, several cars served drive-through penalties for changing lanes before crossing the start finish line. Antonio Fuoco's No. 47 Cetilar Racing Ferrari lost a tire after making contact with Mike Skeen's No. 32 Korthoff Preston Motorsports Mercedes-AMG and brought out the second full course caution. Under the safety car, Brendan Iribe's McLaren was exiting his pit box just as the No. 61 AF Corse Ferrari 296 GT3 of Miguel Molina was entering his when Molina came across the nose of Iribe. Iribe would receive a drive-through penalty for pit lane protocol violation. When racing resumed, Blomqvist was dueling De Phillippi for third while Pin moved the No. 83 Iron Dames Lamborghini into the GTD lead after the pit stop cycle. Keating spun the No. 52 PR1/Mathiasen Motorsports Oreca at turn six and kept his lead over Steven Thomas in LMP2.

The third full course caution was issued when Dennis Andersen's No. 20 High Class Racing Oreca made contact with Charlie Scardina's No. 023 Ferrari approaching turn 10a and collected Brendan Iribe's No. 70 Inception Racing McLaren and spun into Nick Tandy's No. 6 Porsche Penske Motorsport Porsche. The McLaren was retired with severe damage while the No. 6 Porsche would not return for the next 2 hours. Andersen received a 120-second stop-go penalty for incident responsibility. During the full course caution period, Delétraz took the overall lead with Blomqvist's No. 60 Meyer Shank Acura in second. Corey Lewis' No. 1 Paul Miller Racing BMW crashed at turn 10b after colliding with Blomqvist's Acura and brought out the fourth full course caution. Both vehicles returned to the pits for repairs. Alexander Sims ran the red indicator light at the end of the pit lane and came to a stop. Sheldon van der Linde was behind Sims and hit the back of Sims. Sims and van der Linde stopped for new noses, and received a stop plus 60 second hold penalty for running the red light at the exit of the pits. Additionally, van der Linde served a drive-through penalty for incident responsibility. Matt Campbell passed Sébastien Bourdais for the overall lead when racing resumed. Doriane Pin's No. 83 Iron Dames Lamborghini entered the garage due to a reported suspension failure. Jarett Andretti lost control of the No. 36 Ligier at turn five and stopped in the gravel and retired from the race. The safety car was deployed for the fifth time to allow for the car to be recovered while Wayne Boyd's No. 17 AWA Duqueine suffered a fuel pump issue and retired. Barnicoat's No. 14 Lexus spun into the grass at turn four after clipping the kerb, heavily damaging the car's front and stopping at turn seven. A sixth full course yellow was needed for the Lexus' recovery to the garage. Jordan Taylor's No. 3 Corvette was promoted to the lead of GTD Pro following Barnicoat's retirement. The seventh caution was issued when Tommy Milner lost drive in his No. 3 Corvette. The car was retired due to a transmission issue.

=== Sunset to finish ===
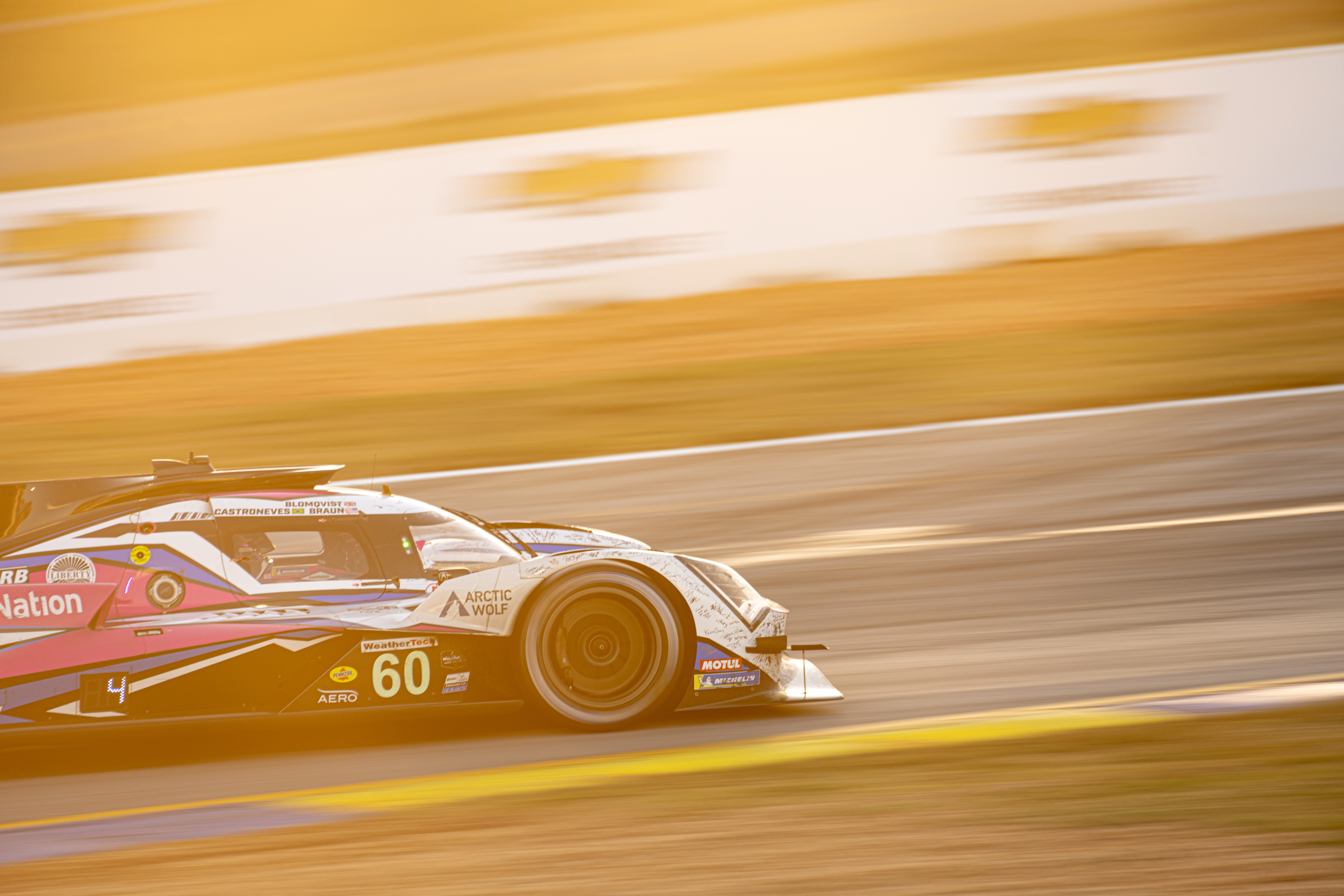
The race-winning No. 60 Acura ARX-06.

The No. 38 Performance Tech Motorsports Ligier was spun around the by Triarsi Competizione Ferrari at turn three which required the eighth full course yellow. The Triarsi Ferrai received a drive-through penalty for incident responsibility. Franck Perera moved the No. 63 Iron Lynx Lamborghini to the GTD Pro lead. Vanthoor's No. 6 Porsche sustained rear end damage against the barrier at turn three after he lost control, and went to the garage to retire from the race. Mikkel Jensen lost control of TDS Racing's No. 11 Oreca at turn five and suffered front-end damage. Jensen brought the car back to the pits and retired with severe damage. A ninth full course yellow was issued when Andy Lally's No. 44 Magnus Aston Martin was beached in the gravel at turn 10 after Lally after making contact with Miguel Molina's No. 61 Ferrari. Aitken moved the Whelen Engineering Racing Cadillac to second after jumping the Wayne Taylor Racing Acura by pitting prior to the fcy being called. When racing resumed, the No. 10 Acura and No. 31 Cadillac dueled for second place overall. Alex Quinn lost control of the No. 52 PR1/Mathiasen Motorsports Oreca at turn 10 and promoted Christian Rasmussen's No. 18 Era Motorsport car to the lead in LMP2. The tenth full course caution was called when Legge's No. 66 Gradient Racing Acura NSX came to a stop. Albuquerque attempted to pass Derani around the outside going into turn one, however, Derani ran Albuquerque off the track and the No. 10 Acura hit the barrier. The safety car was brought out for the eleventh time as barrier repairs were made and the stewards issued no penalty for Derani. Most of the field made their final pit stops during fcy period. When racing resumed, Braun passed van der Zande around the outside of turn one for the overall lead while Derani overtook both the BMW M Team RLL entries. Grist took the lead in LMP3 with 20 minutes remaining after Fraga's No. 74 Riley Motorsports Ligier received a puncture after dueling with the No. 30 Jr III Motorsports Ligier. Rasmussen crashed the Era Motorsport Oreca at turn three, triggering the twelfth full course yellow. On the final restart with 5 minutes remaining, Mirko Bortolotti's GTD Pro No. 63 Lamborghini made contact with Jan Heylen's No. 16 Wright Motorsports Porsche. Heylen's Porsche sustained rear-end damage and caught fire while Bortolotti stopped on track, bringing out the thirteenth (and) final caution forcing the race ended behind the safety car.

Braun, Blomqvist, and Castroneves took victory in the No. 60 Acura. Renger van der Zande, Bourdais, and Dixon were second in the No. 01 Cadillac, and Tincknell, Bruni, and Jani in the No. 59 Porsche rounded out the podium. Hanley, Kurtz, and Siegel took victory in LMP2 ahead of the No. 35 TDS Racing car of van der Garde, Pierson, and Falb in second followed by Loup Chatin, Keating, and Quinn in the No. 52 PR1/Mathiasen Motorsports car. The No. 30 Jr III Motorsports Ligier of Grist, Siegel, and Garg took victory in LMP3 ahead of Bell, Fidani, and Kern in the No. 13 AWA Duqueine. Fraga, Robinson, and Burdon rounded out the podium in the No. 74 Ligier. Juncadella, Gounon, and Engel in the No. 79 WeatherTech Racing Mercedes-AMG secured victory in GTD Pro followed by the No. 9 Pfaff Motorsports Porsche of Estre, Pilet, and Bachler, and third-position finishers Serra, Rigon, and Pier Guidi of Risi Competizione. The No. 78 Forte Racing Lamborghini of Spinelli, Goikhberg, and Liddy took victory in GTD, ahead of Foley, Dinan, and Gallagher in the No. 96 Turner Motorsport entry. Brynjolfsson, Hindman, and Root in the No. 77 Wright Motorsports Porsche rounded out the podium.

=== Post-race ===
Blomqvist said, "At one point it looked like our race was done with about two hours to go. When I jumped out of the car, we were dying out there on some pretty old tires. The guys never gave up and some things came our way". Braun added, "When we got our laps back, we had to be fast at times, be smart and save the car. I think we did all of those things really well today." Derani stated his belief that Albuquerque being too optimistic when he attempted to pass Derani's Cadillac. Tincknell called the No. 59 Porsche's third-place finish as a "mega result".

Sims and Derani took the GTP Drivers' Championship with 2733 points. They were 21 points clear of Filipe Albuquerque and Ricky Taylor. With 1995 points, Keating and Loup-Chatin won the LMP2 Drivers' Championship, 37 points ahead of Hanley and Kurtz in second. With 2162 points, Robinson won the LMP3 Driver's Championship, 217 points clear of Grist in second. Barnicoat and Hawksworth took the GTD Pro Drivers' Championship with 3760 points. They were 112 points ahead of Juncadella and Gounon in second. Antonio García and Jordan Taylor were third with 3579 points followed by Bachler and Pilet in fourth with 3578 points. With 3482 points, Sellers and Snow won the GTD Drivers' Championship, 261 points ahead of De Angelis and Sørensen in second. Telitz and Montecalvo were third with 2927 points. Cadillac, Lexus, and BMW won their respective Manufactures' Championships while Whelen Engineering Racing, PR1/Mathiasen Motorsports, Riley Motorsports, Vasser Sullivan Racing, and Paul Miller Racing won their respective Teams' Championships.

=== Race result ===
Class winners are in bold and ‡.

| Pos | Class | No | Team | Drivers | Chassis | Laps | Time/Retired |
| Pos | Class | No | Team | Drivers | Engine | Laps | Time/Retired |
|---|---|---|---|---|---|---|---|
| 1 | **GTP** | **60** | **(United States) Meyer Shank Racing with Curb-Agajanian** | **(United Kingdom) Tom Blomqvist (United States) Colin Braun (Brazil) Hélio Castroneves** | **Acura ARX-06** | **397** | **10:01:40.400‡** |
| 1 | **GTP** | **60** | **(United States) Meyer Shank Racing with Curb-Agajanian** | **(United Kingdom) Tom Blomqvist (United States) Colin Braun (Brazil) Hélio Castroneves** | **Acura AR24e 2.4 L Turbo V6** | **397** | **10:01:40.400‡** |
| 2 | GTP | 01 | (United States) Cadillac Racing | (France) Sébastien Bourdais (New Zealand) Scott Dixon (Netherlands) Renger van der Zande | Cadillac V-Series.R | 397 | +0.452 |
| 2 | GTP | 01 | (United States) Cadillac Racing | (France) Sébastien Bourdais (New Zealand) Scott Dixon (Netherlands) Renger van der Zande | Cadillac LMC55R 5.5 L V8 | 397 | +0.452 |
| 3 | GTP | 59 | (Germany) Proton Competition | (Italy) Gianmaria Bruni (United Kingdom) Harry Tincknell (Switzerland) Neel Jani | Porsche 963 | 397 | +1.077 |
| 3 | GTP | 59 | (Germany) Proton Competition | (Italy) Gianmaria Bruni (United Kingdom) Harry Tincknell (Switzerland) Neel Jani | Porsche 9RD 4.6 L Turbo V8 | 397 | +1.077 |
| 4 | GTP | 7 | (Germany) Porsche Penske Motorsport | (Australia) Matt Campbell (United States) Josef Newgarden (Brazil) Felipe Nasr | Porsche 963 | 397 | +1.825 |
| 4 | GTP | 7 | (Germany) Porsche Penske Motorsport | (Australia) Matt Campbell (United States) Josef Newgarden (Brazil) Felipe Nasr | Porsche 9RD 4.6 L Turbo V8 | 397 | +1.825 |
| 5 | GTP | 5 | (United States) JDC-Miller MotorSports | (Germany) Mike Rockenfeller (Netherlands) Tijmen van der Helm (United Kingdom) Jenson Button | Porsche 963 | 397 | +2.165 |
| 5 | GTP | 5 | (United States) JDC-Miller MotorSports | (Germany) Mike Rockenfeller (Netherlands) Tijmen van der Helm (United Kingdom) Jenson Button | Porsche 9RD 4.6 L Turbo V8 | 397 | +2.165 |
| 6 | GTP | 31 | (United States) Whelen Engineering Racing | (United Kingdom) Jack Aitken (Brazil) Pipo Derani (United Kingdom) Alexander Sims | Cadillac V-Series.R | 397 | +2.927 |
| 6 | GTP | 31 | (United States) Whelen Engineering Racing | (United Kingdom) Jack Aitken (Brazil) Pipo Derani (United Kingdom) Alexander Sims | Cadillac LMC55R 5.5 L V8 | 397 | +2.927 |
| 7 | GTP | 25 | (United States) BMW M Team RLL | (United States) Connor De Phillippi (South Africa) Sheldon van der Linde (United Kingdom) Nick Yelloly | BMW M Hybrid V8 | 397 | +4.275 |
| 7 | GTP | 25 | (United States) BMW M Team RLL | (United States) Connor De Phillippi (South Africa) Sheldon van der Linde (United Kingdom) Nick Yelloly | BMW P66/3 4.0 L Turbo V8 | 397 | +4.275 |
| 8 | GTP | 24 | (United States) BMW M Team RLL | (Austria) Philipp Eng (Brazil) Augusto Farfus (Germany) Marco Wittmann | BMW M Hybrid V8 | 397 | +4.839 |
| 8 | GTP | 24 | (United States) BMW M Team RLL | (Austria) Philipp Eng (Brazil) Augusto Farfus (Germany) Marco Wittmann | BMW P66/3 4.0 L Turbo V8 | 397 | +4.839 |
| 9 | **LMP2** | **04** | **(United States) CrowdStrike Racing by APR** | **(United Kingdom) Ben Hanley (United States) George Kurtz (United States) Nolan Siegel** | **Oreca 07** | **391** | **+6 Laps‡** |
| 9 | **LMP2** | **04** | **(United States) CrowdStrike Racing by APR** | **(United Kingdom) Ben Hanley (United States) George Kurtz (United States) Nolan Siegel** | **Gibson GK428 4.2 L V8 engine** | **391** | **+6 Laps‡** |
| 10 | LMP2 | 35 | (France) TDS Racing | (United States) John Falb (United States) Josh Pierson (Netherlands) Giedo van der Garde | Oreca 07 | 391 | +6 Laps |
| 10 | LMP2 | 35 | (France) TDS Racing | (United States) John Falb (United States) Josh Pierson (Netherlands) Giedo van der Garde | Gibson GK428 4.2 L V8 engine | 391 | +6 Laps |
| 11 | LMP2 | 52 | (United States) PR1/Mathiasen Motorsports | (France) Paul-Loup Chatin (United States) Ben Keating (United Kingdom) Alex Quinn | Oreca 07 | 391 | +6 Laps |
| 11 | LMP2 | 52 | (United States) PR1/Mathiasen Motorsports | (France) Paul-Loup Chatin (United States) Ben Keating (United Kingdom) Alex Quinn | Gibson GK428 4.2 L V8 engine | 391 | +6 Laps |
| 12 | LMP2 | 88 | (Italy) AF Corse | (France) François Perrodo (France) Matthieu Vaxivière (France) Emmanuel Collard | Oreca 07 | 390 | +7 Laps |
| 12 | LMP2 | 88 | (Italy) AF Corse | (France) François Perrodo (France) Matthieu Vaxivière (France) Emmanuel Collard | Gibson GK428 4.2 L V8 engine | 390 | +7 Laps |
| 13 DNF | LMP2 | 18 | (United States) Era Motorsport | (United Kingdom) Ryan Dalziel (United States) Dwight Merriman (Denmark) Christian Rasmussen | Oreca 07 | 383 | Did Not Finish |
| 13 DNF | LMP2 | 18 | (United States) Era Motorsport | (United Kingdom) Ryan Dalziel (United States) Dwight Merriman (Denmark) Christian Rasmussen | Gibson GK428 4.2 L V8 engine | 383 | Did Not Finish |
| 14 | LMP2 | 20 | (Denmark) High Class Racing | (Denmark) Dennis Andersen (Denmark) Anders Fjordbach (United Arab Emirates) Ed Jones | Oreca 07 | 381 | +16 Laps |
| 14 | LMP2 | 20 | (Denmark) High Class Racing | (Denmark) Dennis Andersen (Denmark) Anders Fjordbach (United Arab Emirates) Ed Jones | Gibson GK428 4.2 L V8 engine | 381 | +16 Laps |
| 15 | **LMP3** | **30** | **(United States) Jr III Motorsports** | **(United States) Bijoy Garg (United States) Nolan Siegel (Canada) Garett Grist** | **Ligier JS P320** | **379** | **+18 Laps‡** |
| 15 | **LMP3** | **30** | **(United States) Jr III Motorsports** | **(United States) Bijoy Garg (United States) Nolan Siegel (Canada) Garett Grist** | **Nissan VK56DE 5.6 L V8** | **379** | **+18 Laps‡** |
| 16 | LMP3 | 13 | (Canada) AWA | (United Kingdom) Matt Bell (Canada) Orey Fidani (Germany) Lars Kern | Duqueine M30 - D08 | 379 | +18 Laps |
| 16 | LMP3 | 13 | (Canada) AWA | (United Kingdom) Matt Bell (Canada) Orey Fidani (Germany) Lars Kern | Nissan VK56DE 5.6 L V8 | 379 | +18 Laps |
| 17 | LMP3 | 74 | (United States) Riley Motorsports | (Australia) Josh Burdon (Brazil) Felipe Fraga (United States) Gar Robinson | Ligier JS P320 | 379 | +18 Laps |
| 17 | LMP3 | 74 | (United States) Riley Motorsports | (Australia) Josh Burdon (Brazil) Felipe Fraga (United States) Gar Robinson | Nissan VK56DE 5.6 L V8 | 379 | +18 Laps |
| 18 | **GTD Pro** | **79** | **(United States) WeatherTech Racing** | **(Germany) Maro Engel (Andorra) Jules Gounon (Spain) Daniel Juncadella** | **Mercedes-AMG GT3 Evo** | **370** | **+27 Laps‡** |
| 18 | **GTD Pro** | **79** | **(United States) WeatherTech Racing** | **(Germany) Maro Engel (Andorra) Jules Gounon (Spain) Daniel Juncadella** | **Mercedes-AMG M159 6.2 L V8** | **370** | **+27 Laps‡** |
| 19 | GTD Pro | 9 | (Canada) Pfaff Motorsports | (Austria) Klaus Bachler (France) Patrick Pilet (France) Kévin Estre | Porsche 911 GT3 R (992) | 370 | +27 Laps |
| 19 | GTD Pro | 9 | (Canada) Pfaff Motorsports | (Austria) Klaus Bachler (France) Patrick Pilet (France) Kévin Estre | Porsche 4.2 L Flat-6 | 370 | +27 Laps |
| 20 | **GTD** | **78** | **(United States) Forte Racing Powered by US RaceTronics** | **(Canada) Misha Goikhberg (United States) Patrick Liddy (Italy) Loris Spinelli** | **Lamborghini Huracán GT3 Evo 2** | **370** | **+27 Laps‡** |
| 20 | **GTD** | **78** | **(United States) Forte Racing Powered by US RaceTronics** | **(Canada) Misha Goikhberg (United States) Patrick Liddy (Italy) Loris Spinelli** | **Lamborghini 5.2 L V10** | **370** | **+27 Laps‡** |
| 21 | GTD | 96 | (United States) Turner Motorsport | (United States) Michael Dinan (United States) Robby Foley (United States) Patrick Gallagher | BMW M4 GT3 | 370 | +27 Laps |
| 21 | GTD | 96 | (United States) Turner Motorsport | (United States) Michael Dinan (United States) Robby Foley (United States) Patrick Gallagher | BMW SS58B30T0 3.0 L Turbo I6 | 370 | +27 Laps |
| 22 | GTD | 77 | (United States) Wright Motorsports | (United States) Alan Brynjolfsson (United States) Trent Hindman (United States) Max Root | Porsche 911 GT3 R (992) | 370 | +27 Laps |
| 22 | GTD | 77 | (United States) Wright Motorsports | (United States) Alan Brynjolfsson (United States) Trent Hindman (United States) Max Root | Porsche 4.2 L Flat-6 | 370 | +27 Laps |
| 23 | GTD Pro | 62 | (United States) Risi Competizione | (Italy) Alessandro Pier Guidi (Italy) Davide Rigon (Brazil) Daniel Serra | Ferrari 296 GT3 | 370 | +27 Laps |
| 23 | GTD Pro | 62 | (United States) Risi Competizione | (Italy) Alessandro Pier Guidi (Italy) Davide Rigon (Brazil) Daniel Serra | Ferrari 3.0 L Turbo V6 | 370 | +27 Laps |
| 24 | GTD | 92 | (United States) Kelly-Moss with Riley | (France) Julien Andlauer (United States) David Brule (United States) Alec Udell | Porsche 911 GT3 R (992) | 370 | +27 Laps |
| 24 | GTD | 92 | (United States) Kelly-Moss with Riley | (France) Julien Andlauer (United States) David Brule (United States) Alec Udell | Porsche 4.2 L Flat-6 | 370 | +27 Laps |
| 25 | GTD | 27 | (United States) Heart of Racing Team | (Canada) Roman De Angelis (United Kingdom) Ian James (Denmark) Marco Sørensen | Aston Martin Vantage AMR GT3 | 370 | +27 Laps |
| 25 | GTD | 27 | (United States) Heart of Racing Team | (Canada) Roman De Angelis (United Kingdom) Ian James (Denmark) Marco Sørensen | Aston Martin 4.0 L Turbo V8 | 370 | +27 Laps |
| 26 | GTD | 32 | (United States) Korthoff Preston Motorsports | (Canada) Mikaël Grenier (United States) Kenton Koch (United States) Mike Skeen | Mercedes-AMG GT3 Evo | 370 | +27 Laps |
| 26 | GTD | 32 | (United States) Korthoff Preston Motorsports | (Canada) Mikaël Grenier (United States) Kenton Koch (United States) Mike Skeen | Mercedes-AMG M159 6.2 L V8 | 370 | +27 Laps |
| 27 | GTD | 97 | (United States) Turner Motorsport | (United States) Bill Auberlen (United States) Chandler Hull (United States) Thomas Merrill | BMW M4 GT3 | 370 | +27 Laps |
| 27 | GTD | 97 | (United States) Turner Motorsport | (United States) Bill Auberlen (United States) Chandler Hull (United States) Thomas Merrill | BMW SS58B30T0 3.0 L Turbo I6 | 370 | +27 Laps |
| 28 | GTD | 80 | (United States) AO Racing Team | (United States) P. J. Hyett (United States) Gunnar Jeannette (United Kingdom) Sebastian Priaulx | Porsche 911 GT3 R (992) | 370 | +27 Laps |
| 28 | GTD | 80 | (United States) AO Racing Team | (United States) P. J. Hyett (United States) Gunnar Jeannette (United Kingdom) Sebastian Priaulx | Porsche 4.2 L Flat-6 | 370 | +27 Laps |
| 29 | GTD Pro | 23 | (United States) Heart of Racing Team | (United Kingdom) Ross Gunn (United Kingdom) David Pittard (Spain) Alex Riberas | Aston Martin Vantage AMR GT3 | 370 | +27 Laps |
| 29 | GTD Pro | 23 | (United States) Heart of Racing Team | (United Kingdom) Ross Gunn (United Kingdom) David Pittard (Spain) Alex Riberas | Aston Martin 4.0 L Turbo V8 | 370 | +27 Laps |
| 30 | GTD | 57 | (United States) Winward Racing | (Netherlands) Indy Dontje (United Kingdom) Philip Ellis (United States) Russell Ward | Mercedes-AMG GT3 Evo | 370 | +27 Laps |
| 30 | GTD | 57 | (United States) Winward Racing | (Netherlands) Indy Dontje (United Kingdom) Philip Ellis (United States) Russell Ward | Mercedes-AMG M159 6.2 L V8 | 370 | +27 Laps |
| 31 | GTD Pro | 61 | (Italy) AF Corse | (United Kingdom) Simon Mann (Spain) Miguel Molina (United Kingdom) James Calado | Ferrari 296 GT3 | 370 | +27 Laps |
| 31 | GTD Pro | 61 | (Italy) AF Corse | (United Kingdom) Simon Mann (Spain) Miguel Molina (United Kingdom) James Calado | Ferrari 3.0 L Turbo V6 | 370 | +27 Laps |
| 32 | GTD | 023 | (United States) Triarsi Competizione | (Italy) Alessio Rovera (United States) Charlie Scardina (United States) Onofrio Triarsi | Ferrari 296 GT3 | 370 | +27 Laps |
| 32 | GTD | 023 | (United States) Triarsi Competizione | (Italy) Alessio Rovera (United States) Charlie Scardina (United States) Onofrio Triarsi | Ferrari 3.0 L Turbo V6 | 370 | +27 Laps |
| 33 | LMP2 | 8 | (United States) Tower Motorsports | (United States) Ari Balogh (New Zealand) Scott McLaughlin (Barbados) Kyffin Simpson | Oreca 07 | 369 | +28 Laps |
| 33 | LMP2 | 8 | (United States) Tower Motorsports | (United States) Ari Balogh (New Zealand) Scott McLaughlin (Barbados) Kyffin Simpson | Gibson GK428 4.2 L V8 engine | 369 | +28 Laps |
| 34 DNF | GTD | 16 | (United States) Wright Motorsports | (United States) Ryan Hardwick (Belgium) Jan Heylen (Canada) Zacharie Robichon | Porsche 911 GT3 R (992) | 367 | Collision (Fire) |
| 34 DNF | GTD | 16 | (United States) Wright Motorsports | (United States) Ryan Hardwick (Belgium) Jan Heylen (Canada) Zacharie Robichon | Porsche 4.2 L Flat-6 | 367 | Collision (Fire) |
| 35 | GTD | 83 | (Italy) Iron Dames | (France) Doriane Pin (Switzerland) Rahel Frey (Denmark) Michelle Gatting | Lamborghini Huracán GT3 Evo 2 | 367 | +30 Laps |
| 35 | GTD | 83 | (Italy) Iron Dames | (France) Doriane Pin (Switzerland) Rahel Frey (Denmark) Michelle Gatting | Lamborghini 5.2 L V10 | 367 | +30 Laps |
| 36 DNF | GTD Pro | 63 | (Italy) Iron Lynx | (Italy) Mirko Bortolotti (South Africa) Jordan Pepper (France) Franck Perera | Lamborghini Huracán GT3 Evo 2 | 366 | Collision |
| 36 DNF | GTD Pro | 63 | (Italy) Iron Lynx | (Italy) Mirko Bortolotti (South Africa) Jordan Pepper (France) Franck Perera | Lamborghini 5.2 L V10 | 366 | Collision |
| 37 DNF | GTP | 10 | (United States) Wayne Taylor Racing w/ Andretti Autosport | (Portugal) Filipe Albuquerque (Switzerland) Louis Delétraz (United States) Ricky Taylor | Acura ARX-06 | 365 | Collision |
| 37 DNF | GTP | 10 | (United States) Wayne Taylor Racing w/ Andretti Autosport | (Portugal) Filipe Albuquerque (Switzerland) Louis Delétraz (United States) Ricky Taylor | Acura AR24e 2.4 L Turbo V6 | 365 | Collision |
| 38 | GTD | 47 | (Italy) Cetilar Racing | (Italy) Antonio Fuoco (Italy) Roberto Lacorte (Italy) Giorgio Sernagiotto | Ferrari 296 GT3 | 364 | +33 Laps |
| 38 | GTD | 47 | (Italy) Cetilar Racing | (Italy) Antonio Fuoco (Italy) Roberto Lacorte (Italy) Giorgio Sernagiotto | Ferrari 3.0 L Turbo V6 | 364 | +33 Laps |
| 39 | LMP3 | 85 | (United States) JDC-Miller MotorSports | (United Kingdom) Till Bechtolsheimer (United States) Dan Goldberg (Sweden) Rasmus Lindh | Duqueine M30 - D08 | 359 | +38 Laps |
| 39 | LMP3 | 85 | (United States) JDC-Miller MotorSports | (United Kingdom) Till Bechtolsheimer (United States) Dan Goldberg (Sweden) Rasmus Lindh | Nissan VK56DE 5.6 L V8 | 359 | +38 Laps |
| 40 | GTD | 93 | (United States) Racers Edge Motorsports with WTR Andretti | (Costa Rica) Danny Formal (United States) Ashton Harrison (Canada) Kyle Marcelli | Acura NSX GT3 Evo22 | 355 | +42 Laps |
| 40 | GTD | 93 | (United States) Racers Edge Motorsports with WTR Andretti | (Costa Rica) Danny Formal (United States) Ashton Harrison (Canada) Kyle Marcelli | Acura 3.5 L Turbo V6 | 355 | +42 Laps |
| 41 DNF | GTD | 66 | (United States) Gradient Racing | (United Kingdom) Katherine Legge (United States) Marc Miller (United States) Sheena Monk | Acura NSX GT3 Evo22 | 355 | Gearbox |
| 41 DNF | GTD | 66 | (United States) Gradient Racing | (United Kingdom) Katherine Legge (United States) Marc Miller (United States) Sheena Monk | Acura 3.5 L Turbo V6 | 355 | Gearbox |
| 42 DNF | GTD | 12 | (United States) Vasser Sullivan Racing | (United States) Frankie Montecalvo (United States) Aaron Telitz (Canada) Parker Thompson | Lexus RC F GT3 | 323 | Mechanical |
| 42 DNF | GTD | 12 | (United States) Vasser Sullivan Racing | (United States) Frankie Montecalvo (United States) Aaron Telitz (Canada) Parker Thompson | Toyota 2UR 5.0 L V8 | 323 | Mechanical |
| 43 DNF | GTD | 44 | (United States) Magnus Racing | (United States) Andy Lally (United States) John Potter (United States) Spencer Pumpelly | Aston Martin Vantage AMR GT3 | 298 | Overheating |
| 43 DNF | GTD | 44 | (United States) Magnus Racing | (United States) Andy Lally (United States) John Potter (United States) Spencer Pumpelly | Aston Martin 4.0 L Turbo V8 | 298 | Overheating |
| 44 DNF | LMP2 | 11 | (France) TDS Racing | (United States) Scott Huffaker (Denmark) Mikkel Jensen (United States) Steven Thomas | Oreca 07 | 262 | Accident |
| 44 DNF | LMP2 | 11 | (France) TDS Racing | (United States) Scott Huffaker (Denmark) Mikkel Jensen (United States) Steven Thomas | Gibson GK428 4.2 L V8 engine | 262 | Accident |
| 45 DNF | LMP3 | 38 | (United States) Performance Tech Motorsports | (Australia) Cameron Shields (United States) Brian Thienes (Canada) Jonathan Woolridge | Ligier JS P320 | 221 | Collision |
| 45 DNF | LMP3 | 38 | (United States) Performance Tech Motorsports | (Australia) Cameron Shields (United States) Brian Thienes (Canada) Jonathan Woolridge | Nissan VK56DE 5.6 L V8 | 221 | Collision |
| 46 DNF | GTD | 1 | (United States) Paul Miller Racing | (United States) Corey Lewis (United States) Bryan Sellers (United States) Madison Snow | BMW M4 GT3 | 207 | Steering |
| 46 DNF | GTD | 1 | (United States) Paul Miller Racing | (United States) Corey Lewis (United States) Bryan Sellers (United States) Madison Snow | BMW SS58B30T0 3.0 L Turbo I6 | 207 | Steering |
| 47 DNF | GTP | 6 | (Germany) Porsche Penske Motorsport | (Belgium) Laurens Vanthoor (France) Mathieu Jaminet (United Kingdom) Nick Tandy | Porsche 963 | 196 | Retired (Damage) |
| 47 DNF | GTP | 6 | (Germany) Porsche Penske Motorsport | (Belgium) Laurens Vanthoor (France) Mathieu Jaminet (United Kingdom) Nick Tandy | Porsche 9RD 4.6 L Turbo V8 | 196 | Retired (Damage) |
| 48 DNF | GTD Pro | 3 | (United States) Corvette Racing | (Spain) Antonio García (United States) Tommy Milner (United States) Jordan Taylor | Chevrolet Corvette C8.R GTD | 189 | Engine |
| 48 DNF | GTD Pro | 3 | (United States) Corvette Racing | (Spain) Antonio García (United States) Tommy Milner (United States) Jordan Taylor | Chevrolet 5.5 L V8 | 189 | Engine |
| 49 DNF | GTD Pro | 14 | (United States) Vasser Sullivan Racing | (United Kingdom) Ben Barnicoat (United Kingdom) Jack Hawksworth (United States) Kyle Kirkwood | Lexus RC F GT3 | 153 | Accident |
| 49 DNF | GTD Pro | 14 | (United States) Vasser Sullivan Racing | (United Kingdom) Ben Barnicoat (United Kingdom) Jack Hawksworth (United States) Kyle Kirkwood | Toyota 2UR 5.0 L V8 | 153 | Accident |
| 50 DNF | LMP3 | 17 | (Canada) AWA | (United Kingdom) Wayne Boyd (Canada) Anthony Mantella (Argentina) Nicolás Varrone | Duqueine M30 - D08 | 118 | Mechanical |
| 50 DNF | LMP3 | 17 | (Canada) AWA | (United Kingdom) Wayne Boyd (Canada) Anthony Mantella (Argentina) Nicolás Varrone | Nissan VK56DE 5.6 L V8 | 118 | Mechanical |
| 51 DNF | LMP3 | 36 | (United States) Andretti Autosport | (United States) Jarett Andretti (Colombia) Gabby Chaves (Netherlands) Glenn van Berlo | Ligier JS P320 | 85 | Mechanical |
| 51 DNF | LMP3 | 36 | (United States) Andretti Autosport | (United States) Jarett Andretti (Colombia) Gabby Chaves (Netherlands) Glenn van Berlo | Nissan VK56DE 5.6 L V8 | 85 | Mechanical |
| 52 DNF | GTD | 70 | (United Kingdom) Inception Racing | (United States) Brendan Iribe (United Kingdom) Ollie Millroy (Denmark) Frederik Schandorff | McLaren 720S GT3 Evo | 44 | Collision |
| 52 DNF | GTD | 70 | (United Kingdom) Inception Racing | (United States) Brendan Iribe (United Kingdom) Ollie Millroy (Denmark) Frederik Schandorff | McLaren M840T 4.0 L Turbo V8 | 44 | Collision |

== Standings after the race ==
GTP Drivers' Championship standings
| Pos. | +/– | Driver | Points |
|---|---|---|---|
| 1 | | (Brazil) Pipo Derani (United Kingdom) Alexander Sims | 2733 |
| 2 | | (Portugal) Filipe Albuquerque (United States) Ricky Taylor | 2712 |
| 3 | 3 | (United Kingdom) Tom Blomqvist (United States) Colin Braun | 2711 |
| 4 | 1 | (Australia) Matt Campbell (Brazil) Felipe Nasr | 2691 |
| 5 | 2 | (United Kingdom) Nick Tandy (France) Mathieu Jaminet | 2691 |

LMP2 Drivers' Championship standings
| Pos. | +/– | Driver | Points |
|---|---|---|---|
| 1 | 1 | (France) Paul-Loup Chatin (United States) Ben Keating | 1995 |
| 2 | 1 | (United Kingdom) Ben Hanley (United States) George Kurtz | 1958 |
| 3 | 2 | (Denmark) Mikkel Jensen (United States) Steven Thomas | 1942 |
| 4 | | (Netherlands) Giedo van der Garde | 1832 |
| 5 | | (United Kingdom) Ryan Dalziel (United States) Dwight Merriman | 1740 |

LMP3 Drivers' Championship standings
| Pos. | +/– | Driver | Points |
|---|---|---|---|
| 1 | | (United States) Gar Robinson | 2162 |
| 2 | 1 | (Canada) Garett Grist | 1945 |
| 3 | 1 | (United Kingdom) Matt Bell (Canada) Orey Fidani | 1882 |
| 4 | 2 | (United Kingdom) Wayne Boyd (Canada) Anthony Mantella | 1870 |
| 5 | | (Australia) Josh Burdon | 1777 |

GTD Pro Drivers' Championship standings
| Pos. | +/– | Driver | Points |
|---|---|---|---|
| 1 | | (United Kingdom) Ben Barnicoat (United Kingdom) Jack Hawksworth | 3760 |
| 2 | 1 | (Andorra) Jules Gounon (Spain) Daniel Juncadella | 3648 |
| 3 | 1 | (Spain) Antonio García (United States) Jordan Taylor | 3579 |
| 4 | | (Austria) Klaus Bachler (France) Patrick Pilet | 3578 |
| 5 | | (United Kingdom) Ross Gunn (Spain) Alex Riberas | 3427 |

GTD Drivers' Championship standings
| Pos. | +/– | Driver | Points |
|---|---|---|---|
| 1 | | (United States) Bryan Sellers (United States) Madison Snow | 3482 |
| 2 | | (Canada) Roman De Angelis (Denmark) Marco Sørensen | 3221 |
| 3 | | (United States) Aaron Telitz (United States) Frankie Montecalvo | 2927 |
| 4 | 1 | (United States) Robby Foley (United States) Patrick Gallagher | 2924 |
| 5 | 1 | (Canada) Misha Goikhberg (Italy) Loris Spinelli | 2921 |

- Note: Only the top five positions are included for all sets of standings.

GTP Teams' Championship standings
| Pos. | +/– | Team | Points |
|---|---|---|---|
| 1 | | (United States) #31 Whelen Engineering Racing | 2733 |
| 2 | | (United States) #10 WTR with Andretti Autosport | 2712 |
| 3 | 3 | (United States) #60 Meyer Shank Racing with Curb-Agajanian | 2711 |
| 4 | 1 | (Germany) #6 Porsche Penske Motorsport | 2691 |
| 5 | | (Germany) #7 Porsche Penske Motorsport | 2691 |

LMP2 Teams' Championship standings
| Pos. | +/– | Team | Points |
|---|---|---|---|
| 1 | 1 | (United States) #52 PR1/Mathiasen Motorsports | 1995 |
| 2 | 1 | (United States) #04 CrowdStrike Racing by APR | 1958 |
| 3 | 2 | (France) #11 TDS Racing | 1942 |
| 4 | 1 | (France) #35 TDS Racing | 1832 |
| 5 | 1 | (United States) #8 Tower Motorsports | 1811 |

LMP3 Teams' Championship standings
| Pos. | +/– | Team | Points |
|---|---|---|---|
| 1 | | (United States) #74 Riley Motorsports | 2162 |
| 2 | 1 | (United States) #30 Jr III Motorsports | 1945 |
| 3 | 1 | (Canada) #13 AWA | 1882 |
| 4 | 2 | (Canada) #17 AWA | 1870 |
| 5 | | (United States) #33 Sean Creech Motorsport | 1415 |

GTD Pro Teams' Championship standings
| Pos. | +/– | Team | Points |
|---|---|---|---|
| 1 | | (United States) #14 Vasser Sullivan Racing | 3760 |
| 2 | 1 | (United States) #79 WeatherTech Racing | 3648 |
| 3 | 1 | (United States) #3 Corvette Racing | 3579 |
| 4 | | (Canada) #9 Pfaff Motorsports | 3578 |
| 5 | | (United States) #23 Heart of Racing Team | 3427 |

GTD Teams' Championship standings
| Pos. | +/– | Team | Points |
|---|---|---|---|
| 1 | | (United States) #1 Paul Miller Racing | 3482 |
| 2 | | (United States) #27 Heart of Racing Team | 3221 |
| 3 | | (United States) #12 Vasser Sullivan Racing | 2927 |
| 4 | 1 | (United States) #96 Turner Motorsport | 2924 |
| 5 | 1 | (United States) #78 Forte Racing Powered by US RaceTronics | 2921 |

- Note: Only the top five positions are included for all sets of standings.

GTP Manufacturers' Championship standings
| Pos. | +/– | Manufacturer | Points |
|---|---|---|---|
| 1 | 1 | (United States) Cadillac | 3096 |
| 2 | 1 | (Germany) Porsche | 3080 |
| 3 | | (Japan) Acura | 3076 |
| 4 | | (Germany) BMW | 2998 |

GTD Pro Manufacturers' Championship standings
| Pos. | +/– | Manufacturer | Points |
|---|---|---|---|
| 1 | | (Japan) Lexus | 3770 |
| 2 | 1 | (Germany) Mercedes-AMG | 3648 |
| 3 | 1 | (United States) Chevrolet | 3589 |
| 4 | | (Germany) Porsche | 3578 |
| 5 | | (United Kingdom) Aston Martin | 3438 |

GTD Manufacturers' Championship standings
| Pos. | +/– | Manufacturer | Points |
|---|---|---|---|
| 1 | | (Germany) BMW | 3888 |
| 2 | | (United Kingdom) Aston Martin | 3484 |
| 3 | 1 | (Germany) Porsche | 3334 |
| 4 | 1 | (Germany) Mercedes-AMG | 3326 |
| 5 | | (Japan) Lexus | 3289 |

- Note: Only the top five positions are included for all sets of standings.
- Note: Bold names include the Drivers', Teams', and Manufactures' Champion respectively.

IMSA SportsCar Championship
| Previous race: 2023 IMSA Battle on the Bricks | 2023 season | Next race: None |
