= 2019 F4 Spanish Championship =

4th season of the Spanish F4 Championship

The 2019 F4 Spanish Championship was the fourth season of the Spanish F4 Championship. It was a multi-event motor racing championship for open wheel, formula racing cars regulated according to FIA Formula 4 regulations, taking place in Spain. The championship featured drivers competing in 1.4 litre Tatuus-Abarth single seat race cars that conformed to the technical regulations for the championship. The series was organised by RFEDA.

== Entry list ==
Team	No.	Driver	Class	Rounds
(Spain) MOL Racing	3	(Spain) Javier Sagrera	R G	7
(Spain) Drivex School	5	(Russia) Irina Sidorkova	R F	1–6
(Spain) Drivex School	5	(Portugal) Manuel Espírito Santo	R G	7
(Spain) Drivex School	11	(Russia) Artem Lobanenko		All
(Spain) Drivex School	12	(Lebanon) Rashed Ghanem		1–5
(Spain) Drivex School	12	(Denmark) Oliver Goethe	R G	7
(Spain) Drivex School	20	(Russia) Ivan Nosov	R	All
(Spain) Drivex School	43	(Argentina) Franco Colapinto	R	All
(Spain) Drivex School	57	(Portugal) Frederico Alfonso Peters	R	4
(Switzerland) Jenzer Motorsport	6	(Argentina) Giorgio Carrara		2
(Switzerland) Jenzer Motorsport	6	(France) Paul-Adrien Pallot	R G	7
(Switzerland) Jenzer Motorsport	17	(United Kingdom) Jonny Edgar	R	2
(Switzerland) Jenzer Motorsport	17	(Romania) Filip Ugran	G	7
(Switzerland) Jenzer Motorsport	18	(Italy) Emidio Pesce	R	2, 7
(Switzerland) G4 Racing	7	(Switzerland) Axel Gnos	R	All
(Netherlands) MP Motorsport	8	(Belgium) Nicolas Baert	R	All
(Netherlands) MP Motorsport	13	(Netherlands) Tijmen van der Helm	R	All
(Netherlands) MP Motorsport	16	(Netherlands) Glenn van Berlo	R	All
(Netherlands) MP Motorsport	19	(Denmark) Sebastian Øgaard	R G	7
(Netherlands) MP Motorsport	26	(Spain) Rafael Villanueva Jr.		All
(United Arab Emirates) Xcel Motorsport	15	(Italy) Matteo Nannini		1
(United Arab Emirates) Xcel Motorsport	34	(Oman) Shihab Al Habsi		1–4
(Spain) Global Racing Service	22	(Spain) Belén García	R F	All
(Spain) Fórmula de Campeones Praga F4	27	(Spain) Nerea Martí	R F	All
(Spain) Fórmula de Campeones Praga F4	33	(Spain) Carles Martínez	R	All
(Spain) Fórmula de Campeones Praga F4	44	(Spain) Kilian Meyer	R	All

Icon	Legend
R	Rookie
F	Female Trophy
G	Guest drivers ineligible to score points

== Race calendar ==
The series competed at Circuit Paul Ricard for the first time. The schedule consisted of seven rounds.

Round		Circuit	Date	Pole position	Fastest lap	Winning driver	Winning team	Supporting
1	R1	(Spain) Circuito de Navarra, Los Arcos	6 April	(Argentina) Franco Colapinto	(Argentina) Franco Colapinto	(Argentina) Franco Colapinto	(Spain) Drivex School	GT-CER; TCR-CER
1	R2	(Spain) Circuito de Navarra, Los Arcos	7 April	(Argentina) Franco Colapinto	(Italy) Matteo Nannini	(Spain) Belén García	(Spain) Global Racing Service	GT-CER; TCR-CER
1	R3	(Spain) Circuito de Navarra, Los Arcos	7 April	(Argentina) Franco Colapinto	(Russia) Artem Lobanenko	(Lebanon) Rashed Ghanem	(Spain) Drivex School	GT-CER; TCR-CER
2	R1	(France) Circuit Paul Ricard, Le Castellet	27 April	(Spain) Kilian Meyer	(Argentina) Giorgio Carrara	(Argentina) Giorgio Carrara	(Switzerland) Jenzer Motorsport	International GT Open; Euroformula Open Championship
2	R2	(France) Circuit Paul Ricard, Le Castellet	27 April	(United Kingdom) Jonny Edgar	(Spain) Killian Meyer	(Argentina) Giorgio Carrara	(Switzerland) Jenzer Motorsport	International GT Open; Euroformula Open Championship
2	R3	(France) Circuit Paul Ricard, Le Castellet	28 April	(United Kingdom) Jonny Edgar	(Argentina) Franco Colapinto	(Argentina) Giorgio Carrara	(Switzerland) Jenzer Motorsport	International GT Open; Euroformula Open Championship
3	R1	(Spain) Ciudad del Motor de Aragón, Alcañiz	25 May	(Oman) Shihab Al Habsi	(Spain) Kilian Meyer	(Argentina) Franco Colapinto	(Spain) Drivex School	GT-CER; TCR-CER
3	R2	(Spain) Ciudad del Motor de Aragón, Alcañiz	26 May	(Oman) Shihab Al Habsi	(Switzerland) Axel Gnos	(Oman) Shihab Al Habsi	(United Arab Emirates) Xcel Motorsport	GT-CER; TCR-CER
3	R3	(Spain) Ciudad del Motor de Aragón, Alcañiz	26 May	(Spain) Kilian Meyer	(Argentina) Franco Colapinto	(Spain) Kilian Meyer	(Spain) Fórmula de Campeones Praga F4	GT-CER; TCR-CER
4	R1	(Spain) Circuit Ricardo Tormo, Cheste	22 June	(Argentina) Franco Colapinto	(Argentina) Franco Colapinto	(Argentina) Franco Colapinto	(Spain) Drivex School	TCR-CER
4	R2	(Spain) Circuit Ricardo Tormo, Cheste	23 June	(Netherlands) Glenn van Berlo	(Argentina) Franco Colapinto	(Argentina) Franco Colapinto	(Spain) Drivex School	TCR-CER
4	R3	(Spain) Circuit Ricardo Tormo, Cheste	23 June	(Netherlands) Glenn van Berlo	(Argentina) Franco Colapinto	(Argentina) Franco Colapinto	(Spain) Drivex School	TCR-CER
5	R1	(Spain) Circuito de Jerez, Jerez de la Frontera	14 September	(Netherlands) Glenn van Berlo	(Netherlands) Glenn van Berlo	(Netherlands) Glenn van Berlo	(Netherlands) MP Motorsport	Iberian Historic Endurance; Super seven by Toyo tires Kia Picanto Cup
5	R2	(Spain) Circuito de Jerez, Jerez de la Frontera	15 September	(Netherlands) Glenn van Berlo	(Netherlands) Glenn van Berlo	(Netherlands) Glenn van Berlo	(Netherlands) MP Motorsport	Iberian Historic Endurance; Super seven by Toyo tires Kia Picanto Cup
5	R3	(Spain) Circuito de Jerez, Jerez de la Frontera	15 September	(Argentina) Franco Colapinto	(Argentina) Franco Colapinto	(Argentina) Franco Colapinto	(Spain) Drivex School	Iberian Historic Endurance; Super seven by Toyo tires Kia Picanto Cup
6	R1	(Portugal) Autódromo Internacional do Algarve, Portimão	26 October	(Argentina) Franco Colapinto	(Argentina) Franco Colapinto	(Argentina) Franco Colapinto	(Spain) Drivex School	TCR Ibérico Touring Car Series
6	R2	(Portugal) Autódromo Internacional do Algarve, Portimão	26 October	(Argentina) Franco Colapinto	(Switzerland) Axel Gnos	(Argentina) Franco Colapinto	(Spain) Drivex School	TCR Ibérico Touring Car Series
6	R3	(Portugal) Autódromo Internacional do Algarve, Portimão	27 October	(Argentina) Franco Colapinto	(Argentina) Franco Colapinto	(Netherlands) Glenn van Berlo	(Netherlands) MP Motorsport	TCR Ibérico Touring Car Series
7	R1	(Spain) Circuit de Barcelona-Catalunya	9 November	(Argentina) Franco Colapinto	(Switzerland) Axel Gnos	(Argentina) Franco Colapinto	(Spain) Drivex School	GT-CER
7	R2	(Spain) Circuit de Barcelona-Catalunya	10 November	(Argentina) Franco Colapinto	(Russia) Artem Lobanenko	(Argentina) Franco Colapinto	(Spain) Drivex School	GT-CER
7	R3	(Spain) Circuit de Barcelona-Catalunya	10 November	(Netherlands) Glenn van Berlo	(Argentina) Franco Colapinto	(Argentina) Franco Colapinto	(Spain) Drivex School	GT-CER

== Championship standings ==
Points were awarded to the top ten classified finishers in races 1 and 3 and for the top eight classified finishers in race 2. No points were awarded for pole position or fastest lap. Race 1 at Paul Ricard only awarded points to the top eight finishers. For Round 6 at Algarve Race 3 was the shorter race, awarding points to the top eight finishers.

Races	Position, points per race									
Races	**1st**	**2nd**	**3rd**	**4th**	**5th**	**6th**	**7th**	**8th**	**9th**	**10th**
Races 1 & 3	25	18	15	12	10	8	6	4	2	1
Race 2	15	12	10	8	6	4	2	1		

=== Drivers' championship ===
Rookie Trophy R Female Trophy F

Pos	Driver	NAV (Spain)			LEC (France)			ARA (Spain)			CRT (Spain)			JER (Spain)			ALG (Portugal)			CAT (Spain)			Pts
Pos	Driver	R1	R2	R3	R1	R2	R3	R1	R2	R3	R1	R2	R3	R1	R2	R3	R1	R2	R3	R1	R2	R3	Pts
1	(Argentina) Franco Colapinto **R**	**1**	**3**	**6**	4	7	4	1	14	11	**1**	1	1	4	3	**1**	**1**	**1**	**4**	**1**	**1**	1	325
2	(Spain) Kilian Meyer **R**	4	Ret	Ret	**5**	4	2	2	3	**1**	2	2	3	3	2	4	Ret	4	2	6	4	11	227
3	(Netherlands) Glenn van Berlo **R**	3	5	Ret	3	5	5	4	Ret	12	5	**Ret**	**2**	**1**	**1**	2	Ret	2	1	3	5	**2**	222
4	(Netherlands) Tijmen van der Helm **R**	7	8	2	13	17	14	7	2	13	4	3	4	2	4	7	10	3	5	17	3	4	158
5	(Spain) Carles Martínez **R**	11	Ret	Ret	7	10	9	5	6	4	3	4	6	10	9	6	3	5	10	10	14	6	111
6	(Switzerland) Axel Gnos **R**	12	10	4	Ret	12	8	6	5	7	9	9	11	6	6	3	Ret	6	3	5	6	9	105
7	(Belgium) Nicolas Baert **R**	9	6	Ret	Ret	6	17	8	7	8	6	5	5	7	5	9	4	12	6	4	7	5	105
8	(Oman) Shihab Al Habsi	2	Ret	DSQ	8	3	6	**3**	**1**	2	11	6	Ret										89
9	(Russia) Artem Lobanenko	8	9	5	6	8	7	9	8	3	7	7	15	9	Ret	11	2	11	13	9	19	18	77
10	(Lebanon) Rashed Ghanem	10	12	1	15	Ret	11	10	4	5	8	15	9	Ret	11	5							61
11	(Argentina) Giorgio Carrara				1	1	1																55
12	(Spain) Rafael Villanueva Jr.	6	7	3	14	9	10	11	10	14	10	10	8	Ret	8	8	6	8	11	11	15	13	51
13	(Russia) Ivan Nosov **R**	14	Ret	DNS	Ret	13	12	12	9	Ret	12	8	7	5	7	12	5	9	7	7	8	10	47
14	(United Kingdom) Jonny Edgar **R**				2	**2**	**3**																39
15	(Spain) Belén García **R** **F**	15	1	7	10	15	13	15	13	10	14	11	10	8	12	10	7	13	8	18	12	14	35
16	(Spain) Nerea Martí **R** **F**	16	2	9	12	16	16	14	12	9	13	13	12	Ret	10	13	8	7	9	15	9	7	35
17	(Italy) Matteo Nannini	5	4	Ret																			18
18	(Russia) Irina Sidorkova **R** **F**	13	11	8	11	14	15	13	11	6	16	14	14	11	13	14	9	10	12				15
19	(Italy) Emidio Pesce **R**				9	11	Ret													12	17	16	1
20	(Portugal) Frederico Alfonso Peters **R**										15	12	13										0
Guest drivers ineligible to score points
	(Romania) Filip Ugran																			2	2	3	0
	(Spain) Javier Sagrera **R**																			16	11	8	0
	(Portugal) Manuel Espírito Santo **R**																			8	18	15	0
	(France) Paul-Adrien Pallot																			19	10	Ret	0
	(Denmark) Sebastian Øgaard **R**																			14	13	12	0
	(Denmark) Oliver Goethe **R**																			13	16	17	0
Pos	Driver	R1	R2	R3	R1	R2	R3	R1	R2	R3	R1	R2	R3	R1	R2	R3	R1	R2	R3	R1	R2	R3	Pts
Pos	Driver	NAV (Spain)			LEC (France)			ARA (Spain)			CRT (Spain)			JER (Spain)			ALG (Portugal)			CAT (Spain)			Pts

Colour	Result
Gold	Winner
Silver	Second place
Bronze	Third place
Green	Points classification
Blue	Non-points classification
Blue	Non-classified finish (NC)
Purple	Retired, not classified (Ret)
Red	Did not qualify (DNQ)
Red	Did not pre-qualify (DNPQ)
Black	Disqualified (DSQ)
White	Did not start (DNS)
White	Withdrew (WD)
White	Race cancelled (C)
Blank	Did not practice (DNP)
Blank	Did not arrive (DNA)
Blank	Excluded (EX)

**Bold** – Pole
Italics – Fastest Lap

=== Teams' championship ===
Pos	Team	Pts
1	(Spain) Drivex School	398
2	(Netherlands) MP Motorsport	368
3	(Spain) Fórmula de Campeones Praga F4	301
4	(United Arab Emirates) Xcel Motorsport	107
5	(Switzerland) Jenzer Motorsport	94
6	(Switzerland) G4 Racing	82
7	(Spain) Global Racing Service	36
8	(Spain) MOL Racing	0
