= Axel Gnos =

Swiss-French racing driver

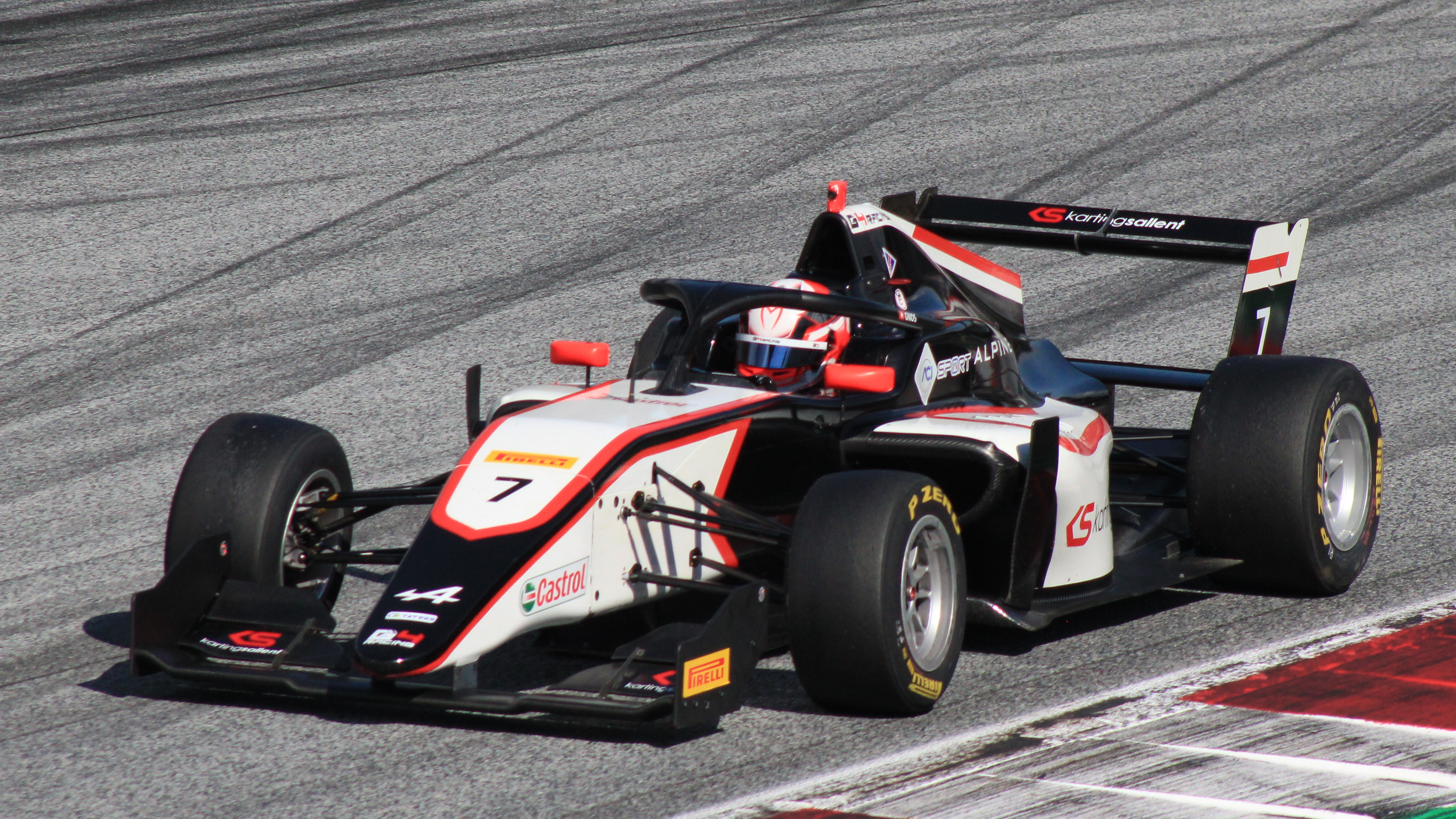
- Gnos at the Red Bull Ring in 2021
- Nationality: (Switzerland) Swiss
- Born: 30 April 2003 (age 23) Lausanne, Switzerland
- Relatives: Patrick Gnos (father)

Formula Regional European Championship career
- Debut season: 2021
- Current team: G4 Racing
- Categorisation: FIA Silver
- Car number: 7
- Starts: 29 (34 entries)
- Wins: 0
- Podiums: 0
- Poles: 0
- Fastest laps: 0
- Best finish: 28th in 2021

Previous series
- 2020 2018-2020 2019 2019: Toyota Racing Series; Italian F4 Championship; F4 Spanish Championship; ADAC Formula 4

Axel Gnos (born 30 April 2003) is a Swiss-French racing driver of Vietnamese descent. He competed in the Formula Regional European Championship for his family team G4 Racing, and won the European Endurance Prototype Cup in LMP3 for Team Virage as part of the 2024 Ultimate Cup Series.

== Career ==
=== Lower formulae ===
Gnos made his car racing debut in the 2018 Italian F4 Championship with AS Motorsport, where he raced in two rounds. In 2019, he drove in both the Italian and Spanish F4 championships, for Jenzer Motorsport and G4 Racing respectively - the latter being founded by his father Patrick. He had a successful campaign in the Spanish series, where he finished on the podium twice and ended his season sixth in the drivers' standings.

In 2020, Gnos once again competed in the Italian F4 Championship with G4 Racing, where he placed 23rd in the championship, having scored six points.

=== Toyota Racing Series ===
Gnos raced in the Toyota Racing Series for Kiwi Motorsport at the start of the 2020 season. He scored 15 points and finished 18th in the standings, last of all full-time drivers.

=== Formula Regional European Championship ===
In February 2021, it was announced that Gnos would be competing in the Formula Regional European Championship with G4 Racing. His season would ultimately prove to be fruitless, with Gnos scoring a best finish of 14th at Barcelona and finishing 28th in the standings.

For the 2022 season, Gnos remained with G4, this time partnering Matías Zagazeta and Owen Tangavelou. Following a challenging campaign, during which Gnos missed a round following a crash at Spa-Francorchamps, Gnos confirmed that he would be leaving the team and the series after the end of the season, which he ended in 31st place.

== Karting record ==
=== Karting career summary ===
Season	Series	Team	Position
2014	Championnat de France — Minime		18th
2015	Challenge Rotax Max France — Cadet		14th
2016	IAME International Open — X30 Junior	Kids To Win	23rd
2016	National Series Karting — Nationale	Kids To Win	62nd

== Racing record ==
=== Racing career summary ===
Season	Series	Team	Races	Wins	Poles	F/Laps	Podiums	Points	Position
2018	Italian F4 Championship	AS Motorsport	6	0	0	0	0	0	38th
2019	ADAC Formula 4 Championship	Jenzer Motorsport	6	0	0	0	0	0	NC
2019	Italian F4 Championship	Jenzer Motorsport	20	0	0	0	0	4	23rd
2019	F4 Spanish Championship	G4 Racing	21	0	0	3	2	105	6th
2020	Italian F4 Championship	G4 Racing	19	0	0	0	0	6	23rd
2020	Toyota Racing Series	Kiwi Motorsport	15	0	0	0	0	60	18th
2021	Formula Regional European Championship	G4 Racing	19	0	0	0	0	0	28th
2022	Formula Regional European Championship	G4 Racing	14	0	0	0	0	0	31st
2023	Italian GT Sprint Championship - GT3 Pro-Am	Nova Race	8	0	0	0	3	78	4th
2023	Ultimate Cup Series - Proto P3	Team Virage	1	1	0	0	1	25	14th
2024	Ultimate Cup Series - Proto P3	Team Virage	6	2	0	1	4	100	**1st**
2024	Le Mans Cup - LMP3	Bretton Racing	1	0	0	0	0	0	NC
2024	Le Mans Cup - LMP3	Graff	1	0	0	0	0	0	NC
2024	Império Endurance Brasil - P1	Foresti Sports	2	1	0	0	1	*	*
2025	Le Mans Cup - LMP3	ANS Motorsport	7	0	0	0	0	12	16th
2025	Ultimate Cup European Series - GT Endurance Cup - UCS1	Krafft Racing							

* Season still in progress.

=== Complete Italian F4 Championship results ===
(key) (Races in bold indicate pole position) (Races in italics indicate fastest lap)

Year	Team	1	2	3	4	5	6	7	8	9	10	11	12	13	14	15	16	17	18	19	20	21	22	Pos	Points
2018	AS Motorsport	ADR; 1	ADR; 2	ADR; 3	LEC; 1; 25	LEC; 2; 27	LEC; 3; 30	MNZ; 1	MNZ; 2	MNZ; 3	MIS; 1	MIS; 2	MIS; 3	IMO; 1; 22	IMO; 2; 24	IMO; 3; 16	VLL; 1	VLL; 2	VLL; 3	MUG; 1	MUG; 2	MUG; 3		38th	0
2019	Jenzer Motorsport	VLL; 1; 9	VLL; 2; 22	VLL; 3; 16	MIS; 1; 24	MIS; 2; 22	MIS; 3 C	HUN; 1; 23	HUN; 2; 25	HUN; 3 DNS	RBR; 1; 18	RBR; 2; 16	RBR; 3; 13	IMO; 1; 22	IMO; 2; 13	IMO; 3; 20	IMO; 4; 10	MUG; 1; 10	MUG; 2; 11	MUG; 3; 27	MNZ; 1; 19	MNZ; 2 Ret	MNZ; 3; 13	23rd	4
2020	G4 Racing	MIS; 1; 13	MIS; 2; 13	MIS; 3; 12	IMO1; 1 Ret	IMO1; 2; 13	IMO1; 3; 9	RBR; 1 Ret	RBR; 2; 17	RBR; 3; 11	MUG; 1; 25	MUG; 2; 8	MUG; 3; 13	MNZ; 1 Ret	MNZ; 2 DNS	MNZ; 3 Ret	IMO2; 1 Ret	IMO2; 2 Ret	IMO2; 3; 24	VLL; 1; 21	VLL; 2 C	VLL; 3; 12		23rd	6

=== Complete F4 Spanish Championship results ===
(key) (Races in bold indicate pole position) (Races in italics indicate fastest lap)

Year	Team	1	2	3	4	5	6	7	8	9	10	11	12	13	14	15	16	17	18	19	20	21	DC	Points
2019	G4 Racing	NAV; 1; 12	NAV; 2; 10	NAV; 3; 4	LEC; 1 Ret	LEC; 2; 12	LEC; 3; 8	ARA; 1; 6	ARA; 2; 5	ARA; 3; 7	CRT; 1; 9	CRT; 2; 9	CRT; 3; 11	JER; 1; 6	JER; 2; 6	JER; 3; 3	ALG; 1 Ret	ALG; 2; 6	ALG; 3; 3	CAT; 1; 5	CAT; 2; 6	CAT; 3; 9	6th	105

=== Complete Toyota Racing Series results ===
(key) (Races in bold indicate pole position) (Races in italics indicate fastest lap)

Year	Team	1	2	3	4	5	6	7	8	9	10	11	12	13	14	15	DC	Points
2020	Kiwi Motorsport	HIG; 1; 15	HIG; 2; 16	HIG; 3; 11	TER; 1; 14	TER; 2; 17	TER; 3; 15	HMP; 1; 15	HMP; 2 Ret	HMP; 3 Ret	PUK; 1; 15	PUK; 2; 16	PUK; 3; 16	MAN; 1; 14	MAN; 2; 17	MAN; 3; 14	18th	60

=== Complete Formula Regional European Championship results ===
(key) (Races in bold indicate pole position) (Races in italics indicate fastest lap)

Year	Team	1	2	3	4	5	6	7	8	9	10	11	12	13	14	15	16	17	18	19	20	DC	Points
2021	G4 Racing	IMO; 1; 17	IMO; 2; 15	CAT; 1; 20	CAT; 2; 14	MCO; 1; 19	MCO; 2 DNQ	LEC; 1 Ret	LEC; 2; 25	ZAN; 1; 28	ZAN; 2; 25	SPA; 1; 20	SPA; 2; 23	RBR; 1; 27	RBR; 2; 24	VAL; 1; 27	VAL; 2; 20	MUG; 1; 26	MUG; 2; 19	MNZ; 1; 29	MNZ; 2; 21	28th	0
2022	G4 Racing	MNZ; 1 Ret	MNZ; 2 WD	IMO; 1; 18	IMO; 2; 29	MCO; 1 DNQ	MCO; 2; 24	LEC; 1; 28	LEC; 2; 24	ZAN; 1; 25	ZAN; 2; 30	HUN; 1; 29	HUN; 2; 22	SPA; 1 WD	SPA; 1 WD	RBR; 1	RBR; 2	CAT; 1; 29	CAT; 2; 28	MUG; 1; 26	MUG; 2; 32	31st	0

=== Complete Italian GT Championship Sprint results ===
(key) (Races in bold indicate pole position) (Races in italics indicate fastest lap)

Year	Team	Car	Class	1	2	3	4	5	6	7	8	DC	Points
2023	Nova Race	Honda NSX GT3 Evo22	Pro-Am	MIS; 1; 6	MIS; 2; 11	MNZ; 1; 9	MNZ; 2; 7	MUG; 1; 7	MUG; 2 Ret	IMO; 1; 5	IMO; 2; 9	4th	78

^{*} Season still in progress.

=== Complete Ultimate Cup Series results ===
(key) (Races in bold indicate pole position; results in italics indicate fastest lap)

Year	Entrant	Class	Chassis	1	2	3	4	5	6	Rank	Points
2023	Team Virage	LMP3	Ligier JS P320	LEC1	NAV	HOC	EST	MAG	LEC2; 1	14th	25
2024	Team Virage	LMP3	Ligier JS P320	LEC1; 10	ALG; 1	HOC; 2	MUG; 8	MAG; 9	LEC2; 13	1st	100

^{*} Season still in progress.

=== Complete Le Mans Cup results ===
(key) (Races in bold indicate pole position; results in italics indicate fastest lap)

Year	Entrant	Class	Chassis	1	2	3	4	5	6	7	Rank	Points
2024	Bretton Racing	LMP3	Ligier JS P320	CAT; 16							NC	0
2024	Graff	LMP3	Ligier JS P320		LEC; 14	LMS; 1	LMS; 2	SPA	MUG	ALG	NC	0
2025	ANS Motorsport	LMP3	Ligier JS P325	CAT; 13	LEC; 6	LMS; 1; 18	LMS; 2; 20	SPA; 8	SIL; 14	ALG	14th*	12*

^{*} Season still in progress.
