= 2019 Trofeo de España TCR =

The 2019 Trofeo de España TCR was the fourth season of the TCR Spanish Series. The championship was run as the one of classes of the Campeonato de España Resistencia.

Alba Cano was crowned as the season's champion.

== Teams and drivers ==
Team	Car	No.	Drivers	Rounds
(Spain) SMC Junior Motorsport	Peugeot 308 Racing Cup	2	(Spain) Enrique Hernando	All
(Spain) SMC Junior Motorsport	Peugeot 308 Racing Cup	2	(Spain) Gonzalo de Andrés	1, 3−4
(Spain) SMC Junior Motorsport	Peugeot 308 Racing Cup	2	(Spain) Gonzalo Martín	2, 5
(Spain) SMC Junior Motorsport	Peugeot 308 Racing Cup	5	(Spain) Marta Suria Soler	3
(Spain) Monlau Competicion	CUPRA León TCR	7	(Italy) Gianluigi Vicinanza	All
(Spain) Monlau Competicion	CUPRA León TCR	7	(Spain) Álex Cosin	All
(Spain) Monlau Competicion	CUPRA León TCR DSG	15	(Spain) Alba Cano	All
(Spain) Monlau Competicion	CUPRA León TCR DSG	15	(Spain) David Cebrián	5
(Spain) PCR Sport	CUPRA León TCR DSG	10	(Spain) Vicente Dasi	1−3, 5
(Spain) PCR Sport	CUPRA León TCR DSG	10	(Spain) Josep Parera	1−2, 5
(Spain) PCR Sport	CUPRA León TCR DSG	10	(Spain) Unai Arruabarrena	3
(Spain) PCR Sport	CUPRA León TCR DSG	36	(Spain) Guillermo Aso	1−2, 4
(Spain) PCR Sport	CUPRA León TCR DSG	36	(Spain) Álvaro Fontes	1, 4
(Spain) PCR Sport	CUPRA León TCR	40	(Spain) Ferran Monje	5
(Spain) PCR Sport	CUPRA León TCR	40	(Spain) Fernando Monje	5
(Spain) PCR Sport	CUPRA León TCR	60	(Spain) Jon Aramburu	1
(Spain) PCR Sport	CUPRA León TCR	60	(Spain) Antonio Aristi	1
(Spain) PCR Sport	CUPRA León TCR DSG	72	(Spain) Antonio Aristi	2
(Spain) PCR Sport	CUPRA León TCR DSG	72	(Spain) Harriet Arruabarrena	2
(Spain) PCR Sport	CUPRA León TCR DSG	72	(Spain) Alexander Villanueva Ruiz	4−5
(Spain) PCR Sport	CUPRA León TCR DSG	72	(Spain) Alexander Villanueva Brox	4−5
(Qatar) QMMF Racing by PCR Sport	CUPRA León TCR	59	(Qatar) Abdulla Ali Al-Khelaifi	3
(Spain) Baporo Motorsport	CUPRA León TCR DSG	13	(Andorra) Amalia Vinyes	All
(Spain) Baporo Motorsport	CUPRA León TCR	77	(Italy) Alberto Vescovi	1−4
(Spain) Baporo Motorsport	CUPRA León TCR	77	(Italy) Roberto Ferri	All
(Spain) Tecnicars Racing Team	CUPRA León TCR DSG	16	(Russia) Evgeni Leonov	All
(Spain) Tecnicars Racing Team	CUPRA León TCR DSG	16	(France) Desiré Torres	1
(Spain) Tecnicars Racing Team	CUPRA León TCR DSG	16	(Spain) Mikel Azcona	2, 4−5
(Spain) RC2 Junior Team	CUPRA León TCR	17	(Spain) Raul Martínez	All
(Spain) RC2 Junior Team	CUPRA León TCR	17	(Spain) Ruben Martinez	All
(Spain) RC2 Junior Team	CUPRA León TCR DSG	23	(Spain) Didac Ros	All
(Spain) RC2 Junior Team	CUPRA León TCR DSG	23	(Spain) Marc De Fulgencio	1
(Spain) RC2 Junior Team	CUPRA León TCR DSG	23	(Spain) Rubén Fernandez	2
(Spain) RC2 Junior Team	CUPRA León TCR DSG	23	(Spain) David Cebrián	3
(Spain) RC2 Junior Team	CUPRA León TCR DSG	23	(Spain) José Luís García	4−5
(Spain) Motor Club Sabadell	CUPRA León TCR DSG	47	(Spain) Alejandro Galindo	3
(Spain) Motor Club Sabadell	CUPRA León TCR DSG	70	(Spain) Arturo Espuny	1−3, 5
(Spain) Motor Club Sabadell	CUPRA León TCR DSG	70	(Spain) Alejandro Royo	5
(Spain) Motor Club Sabadell	CUPRA León TCR	66	(Spain) Julio Carayol	1, 3
(Spain) Escuderia Milesocasiones	CUPRA León TCR	66	(Spain) Julio Carayol	4−5
(Spain) Escuderia Milesocasiones	CUPRA León TCR	66	(Spain) German Lopez	5

== Calendar and results ==
Rnd.	Circuit	Date	Pole position	Fastest lap	Winning driver	Winning team	Supporting
1	(Navarre) Circuito de Navarra, Los Arcos	6–7 April	(Italy) Gianluigi Vicinanza (Spain) Álex Cosin	(Spain) Guillermo Aso (Spain) Álvaro Fontes	(Andorra) Amalia Vinyes	(Spain) Baporo Motorsport	F4 Spanish Championship
1	(Navarre) Circuito de Navarra, Los Arcos	6–7 April	(Spain) Gonzalo de Andrés (Spain) Enrique Hernando	(Italy) Gianluigi Vicinanza (Spain) Álex Cosin	(Spain) Gonzalo de Andrés (Spain) Enrique Hernando	(Spain) SMC Junior Motorsport	F4 Spanish Championship
2	(Aragon) Ciudad del Motor de Aragón, Alcañiz	25–26 May	(Russia) Evgeni Leonov (Spain) Mikel Azcona	(Russia) Evgeni Leonov (Spain) Mikel Azcona	(Russia) Evgeni Leonov (Spain) Mikel Azcona	(Spain) Tecnicars Racing Team	F4 Spanish Championship
2	(Aragon) Ciudad del Motor de Aragón, Alcañiz	25–26 May	(Spain) Raul Martínez (Spain) Ruben Martinez	(Russia) Evgeni Leonov (Spain) Mikel Azcona	(Andorra) Amalia Vinyes	(Spain) Baporo Motorsport	F4 Spanish Championship
3	(Valencian Community) Circuit Ricardo Tormo, Cheste	22-23 June	(Spain) Alba Cano	(Spain) Raul Martínez (Spain) Ruben Martinez	(Spain) Didac Ros (Spain) David Cebrián	(Spain) RC2 Junior Team	F4 Spanish Championship
3	(Valencian Community) Circuit Ricardo Tormo, Cheste	22-23 June	(Spain) Alba Cano	(Spain) Raul Martínez (Spain) Ruben Martinez	(Spain) Gonzalo de Andrés (Spain) Enrique Hernando	(Spain) SMC Junior Motorsport	F4 Spanish Championship
4	(Community of Madrid) Circuito del Jarama, Madrid	12–13 October	(Spain) Didac Ros	(Russia) Evgeni Leonov (Spain) Mikel Azcona	(Spain) Raul Martínez (Spain) Ruben Martinez	(Spain) RC2 Junior Team	Campeonato de Turismo de España
4	(Community of Madrid) Circuito del Jarama, Madrid	12–13 October	(Andorra) Amalia Vinyes	(Russia) Evgeni Leonov (Spain) Mikel Azcona	(Russia) Evgeni Leonov (Spain) Mikel Azcona	(Spain) Tecnicars Racing Team	Campeonato de Turismo de España
5	(Catalonia) Circuit de Barcelona-Catalunya, Montmeló	9–10 November	(Russia) Evgeni Leonov (Spain) Mikel Azcona	(Russia) Evgeni Leonov (Spain) Mikel Azcona	(Russia) Evgeni Leonov (Spain) Mikel Azcona	(Spain) Tecnicars Racing Team	F4 Spanish Championship

== Championship standings ==
=== Scoring system ===
Position	1st	2nd	3rd	4th	5th	6th	7th	8th	9th	10th	11th	12th	13th	14th	15th	16th	17th	18th	19th	20th
Endurance races	52	48	44	36	32	28	24	20	18	16	14	12	10	8	6	5	4	3	2	1
Sprint races	40	36	32	24	20	16	14	10	8	6	5	4	3	2	1					

=== Drivers' championship ===
Pos.	Driver	NAV		ALC		VAL		JAR		BAR	Pts.
1	(Spain) Alba Cano	2	5	9	5	3	3	2	3	5	240
2	(Spain) Didac Ros	6	4	7	4	1	4	3	2	11	210
3	(Andorra) Amalia Vinyes	1	6	5	1	8	6	4	9	7	190
4	(Spain) Raul Martínez (Spain) Ruben Martinez	4	9	6	3	2	Ret	1	5	Ret	176
5	(Italy) Gianluigi Vicinanza (Spain) Álex Cosin	3	3	8	9	5	10	Ret	7	2	170
6	(Russia) Evgeni Leonov	Ret	7	1	12	7	Ret	Ret	1	1	164
7	(Italy) Roberto Ferri	7	12	3	8	6	5	Ret	6	4	148
8	(Spain) Mikel Azcona			1	12			Ret	1	1	136
9	(Spain) Enrique Hernando	Ret	1	11	7	Ret	1	Ret	8	9	127
10	(Spain) Arturo Espuny	5	10	4	6	Ret	7			3	124
11	(Italy) Alberto Vescovi	7	12	3	8	6	5	Ret	6		112
12	(Spain) Guillermo Aso	Ret	2	12	2			Ret	4		100
13	(Spain) David Cebrián					1	4			5	96
14	(Spain) Gonzalo de Andrés	Ret	1			Ret	1	Ret	8		90
15	(Spain) José Luís García							3	2	11	82
16	(Spain) Vicente Dasi	8	8	10	11	9	9			6	75
17	(Qatar) Abdulla Ali Al-Khelaifi					4	2				60
18	(Spain) Álvaro Fontes	Ret	2					Ret	4		60
19	(Spain) Josep Parera	8	8	10	11					6	59
20	(Spain) Antonio Aristi (Spain) Harriet Arruabarrena			2	10						42
21	(Spain) Marc De Fulgencio	6	4								40
22	(Spain) Rubén Fernandez			7	4						38
23	(Spain) Gonzalo Martín (2, 5)			11	7					9	37
24	(Spain) Julio Carayol	Ret	11					Ret	Ret	8	25
25	(Spain) Unai Arruabarrena					9	9				16
26	(Spain) Alexander Villanueva Ruiz (Spain) Alexander Villanueva Brox							Ret	Ret	10	16
27	(France) Desiré Torres	Ret	7								14
28	(Spain) Alejandro Galindo					Ret	8				10
29	(Spain) Marta Suria Soler					Ret	DSN				0
Pos.	Driver	NAV		ALC		VAL		JAR		BAR	Pts.

Colour	Result
Gold	Winner
Silver	Second place
Bronze	Third place
Green	Points classification
Blue	Non-points classification
Blue	Non-classified finish (NC)
Purple	Retired, not classified (Ret)
Red	Did not qualify (DNQ)
Red	Did not pre-qualify (DNPQ)
Black	Disqualified (DSQ)
White	Did not start (DNS)
White	Withdrew (WD)
White	Race cancelled (C)
Blank	Did not practice (DNP)
Blank	Did not arrive (DNA)
Blank	Excluded (EX)

**Bold** – Pole
Italics – Fastest Lap

† – Drivers did not finish the race, but were classified as they completed over 75% of the race distance.
