= G4 Racing =

Swiss motor racing team

(Switzerland) G4 Racing
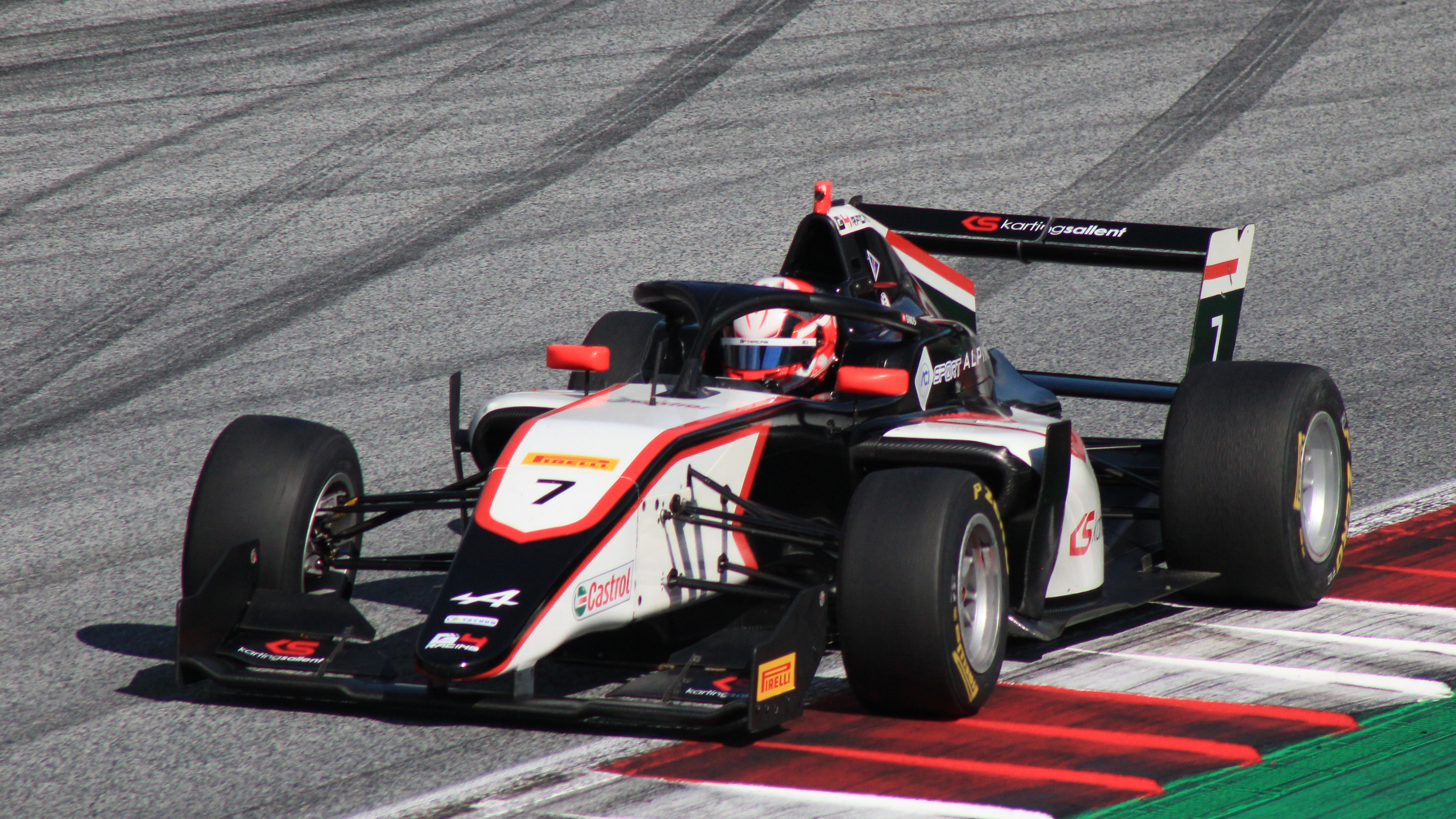
- Founded: 2019
- Team principal(s): Patrick Gnos
- Founder(s): Gnos family
- Current series: F4 Spanish Championship; Formula Regional European Championship
- Former series: Italian F4 Championship
- Current drivers: FREC: (Kuwait) Saqer Al-Maosherji (United States) Rahim Alibhai (Norway) Marcus Sæter; Spanish F4: (Greece) Philippe Armand Karras (Greece) Jean-Paul Karras (South Africa) Jorden Moodley
- Website: https://g4-racing.com/

G4 Racing is a Swiss racing team based in Spain, which currently competes in 2025 Formula Regional European Championship and 2025 F4 Spanish Championship.

== History ==
The team was created in 2019 by the Gnos family to support Axel Gnos in his 2019 F4 Spanish Championship season. For 2020 season they moved from F4 Spanish Championship to Italian F4 Championship, again with one car for Gnos.

In March 2021 G4 Racing took over the assets of Bhaitech and moved their base to Montmeló. They also took over Bhaitech's Formula Regional European Championship entry. In their first-ever Formula Regional season they took two wins with Michael Belov and finished sixth in teams' standings. In the next season however they did not score any points.

For the 2023 season, French F4 champion Alessandro Giusti joined the team for the FRECA campaign. The Frenchman won three races for the team. In 2024 G4 Racing's only podium came at Circuit Paul Ricard and was achieved by Kanato Le.

In 2025 the team came back to F4 Spanish Championship after a six-year hiatus. They fielded the French-Greek brothers Philippe Armand Karras and Jean-Paul Karras.

== Current series results ==
=== F4 Spanish Championship ===
| Year | Chassis | Drivers | Races | Wins | Poles | F. Laps | Podiums | Pts | D.C. | Pts | T.C. |
|---|---|---|---|---|---|---|---|---|---|---|---|
| 2019 | Tatuus F4-T014 | (Switzerland) Axel Gnos | 21 | 0 | 0 | 3 | 2 | 105 | 6th | 82 | 6th |
| 2025 | Tatuus F4-T421 | (Greece) Jean-Paul Karras† | 11 | 0 | 0 | 0 | 0 | 0 | 40th | 0 | NC |
| 2025 | Tatuus F4-T421 | (Greece) Philippe Armand Karras† | 11 | 0 | 0 | 0 | 0 | 0 | 41st | 0 | NC |
| 2026 | Tatuus F4-T421 | (Greece) Philippe Armand Karras | 18 | 0 | 0 | 1 | 0 | 7 | 19th | 8 | 11th |
| 2026 | Tatuus F4-T421 | (Greece) Jean-Paul Karras | 18 | 0 | 0 | 0 | 0 | 1 | 25th | 8 | 11th |
| 2026 | Tatuus F4-T421 | (France) Romauld Bocquet | 3 | 0 | 0 | 0 | 0 | 0 | 39th | 8 | 11th |
| 2026 | Tatuus F4-T421 | (United Arab Emirates) Stefano Pedani | 3 | 0 | 0 | 0 | 0 | 0 | 40th | 8 | 11th |
| 2026 | Tatuus F4-T421 | (South Africa) Jorden Moodley | 10 | 0 | 0 | 0 | 0 | 0 | 43rd | 8 | 11th |
| 2026 | Tatuus F4-T421 | (China) Zhao Zijun | 3 | 0 | 0 | 0 | 0 | 0 | 47th | 8 | 11th |
| 2026 | Tatuus F4-T421 | (United Kingdom) Archie Davies | 3 | 0 | 0 | 0 | 0 | 0 | 54th | 8 | 11th |

† Karras brothers competed with Saintéloc Racing in round 1.

=== Formula Regional European Championship ===
| Year | Chassis | Drivers | Races | Wins | Poles | F. Laps | Podiums | Pts | D.C. | Pts | T.C. |
|---|---|---|---|---|---|---|---|---|---|---|---|
| 2021 | Tatuus F3 T-318 | (Russia) Michael Belov† | 13 | 2 | 2 | 4 | 5 | 116 | 8th | 116 | 6th |
| 2021 | Tatuus F3 T-318 | (Switzerland) Axel Gnos | 19 | 0 | 0 | 0 | 0 | 0 | 28th | 116 | 6th |
| 2021 | Tatuus F3 T-318 | (Italy) Alessandro Famularo (Note: Famularo is a Venezuelan driver who competed under an Italian licence.) | 5 | 0 | 0 | 0 | 0 | 0 | 32nd | 116 | 6th |
| 2021 | Tatuus F3 T-318 | (Spain) Belén García | 8 | 0 | 0 | 0 | 0 | 0 | 39th | 116 | 6th |
| 2021 | Tatuus F3 T-318 | (New Zealand) Callum Hedge | 2 | 0 | 0 | 0 | 0 | 0 | NC | 116 | 6th |
| 2022 | Tatuus F3 T-318 | (France) Owen Tangavelou‡ | 18 | 0 | 0 | 0 | 0 | 15 | 20th | 0 | 12th |
| 2022 | Tatuus F3 T-318 | (Switzerland) Axel Gnos | 13 | 0 | 0 | 0 | 0 | 0 | 31st | 0 | 12th |
| 2022 | Tatuus F3 T-318 | (Peru) Matías Zagazeta | 19 | 0 | 0 | 0 | 0 | 0 | 32nd | 0 | 12th |
| 2022 | Tatuus F3 T-318 | (France) Gillian Henrion | 2 | 0 | 0 | 0 | 0 | 0 | NC | 0 | 12th |
| 2022 | Tatuus F3 T-318 | (Czech Republic) Tereza Bábíčková | 0 | 0 | 0 | 0 | 0 | 0 | NC | 0 | 12th |
| 2023 | Tatuus F3 T-318 | (France) Alessandro Giusti | 20 | 3 | 2 | 3 | 4 | 111 | 6th | 134 | 5th |
| 2023 | Tatuus F3 T-318 | (Kyrgyzstan) Michael Belov (Note: Belov and Smal are Russian, but they compete under a Kyrgyz licence as Russian national emblems were banned by the FIA following the Russian invasion of Ukraine. Bedrin, also a Russian, competes under an Italian licence for the same reason.) | 16 | 0 | 0 | 1 | 0 | 23 | 20th | 134 | 5th |
| 2023 | Tatuus F3 T-318 | (France) Pierre-Alexandre Provost | 9 | 0 | 0 | 0 | 0 | 0 | 30th | 134 | 5th |
| 2023 | Tatuus F3 T-318 | (Argentina) Juan Francisco Soldavini | 4 | 0 | 0 | 0 | 0 | 0 | NC | 134 | 5th |
| 2024 | Tatuus F3 T-318 | (United Kingdom) Kanato Le (Note: Le is a Japanese driver who competed under a British licence.) | 20 | 0 | 0 | 0 | 1 | 27 | 18th | 27 | 9th |
| 2024 | Tatuus F3 T-318 | (France) Romain Andriolo | 20 | 0 | 0 | 0 | 0 | 0 | 25th | 27 | 9th |
| 2024 | Tatuus F3 T-318 | (Mexico) Jesse Carrasquedo Jr. | 8 | 0 | 0 | 0 | 0 | 0 | 33th | 27 | 9th |
| 2024 | Tatuus F3 T-318 | (Brazil) Álvaro Cho | 4 | 0 | 0 | 0 | 0 | 0 | 37th | 27 | 9th |
| 2024 | Tatuus F3 T-318 | (United States) Jett Bowling | 4 | 0 | 0 | 0 | 0 | 0 | NC | 27 | 9th |
| 2025 | Tatuus F3 T-318 | (Spain) Edu Robinson | 14 | 0 | 0 | 0 | 0 | 1 | 21st | 1 | 9th |
| 2025 | Tatuus F3 T-318 | (Poland) Kacper Sztuka** | 6 | 0 | 0 | 0 | 0 | 0 | 24th | 1 | 9th |
| 2025 | Tatuus F3 T-318 | (Kuwait) Saqer Al-Maosherji* | 17 | 0 | 0 | 0 | 0 | 0 | 28th | 1 | 9th |
| 2025 | Tatuus F3 T-318 | (France) Édouard Borgna | 20 | 0 | 0 | 0 | 0 | 0 | 31st | 1 | 9th |
| 2025 | Tatuus F3 T-318 | (Luxembourg) Enzo Richer | 2 | 0 | 0 | 0 | 0 | 0 | 35th | 1 | 9th |
| 2025 | Tatuus F3 T-318 | (France) Arthur Aegerter | 5 | 0 | 0 | 0 | 0 | 0 | 36th | 1 | 9th |

† Belov competed with JD Motorsport in round 4.

‡ Tangavelou competed with RPM from round 6 onwards.

* Al Maosherji competed with AKCEL GP until round 6.

** Sztuka competed with RPM in round 9.

== Former series results ==
=== Italian F4 Championship ===
| Year | Chassis | Drivers | Races | Wins | Poles | F. Laps | Podiums | Pts | D.C. | Pts | T.C. |
|---|---|---|---|---|---|---|---|---|---|---|---|
| 2020 | Tatuus F4-T014 | (Switzerland) Axel Gnos | 19 | 0 | 0 | 0 | 0 | 6 | 23rd | 6 | 10th |

== Timeline ==
Current series
| F4 Spanish Championship | 2019, 2025–present |
| Formula Regional European Championship | 2021–present |
| Formula Regional Middle East Trophy | 2026–present |
Former series
| Italian F4 Championship | 2020 |
