= Cora Schumacher =

German television personality (born 1976)

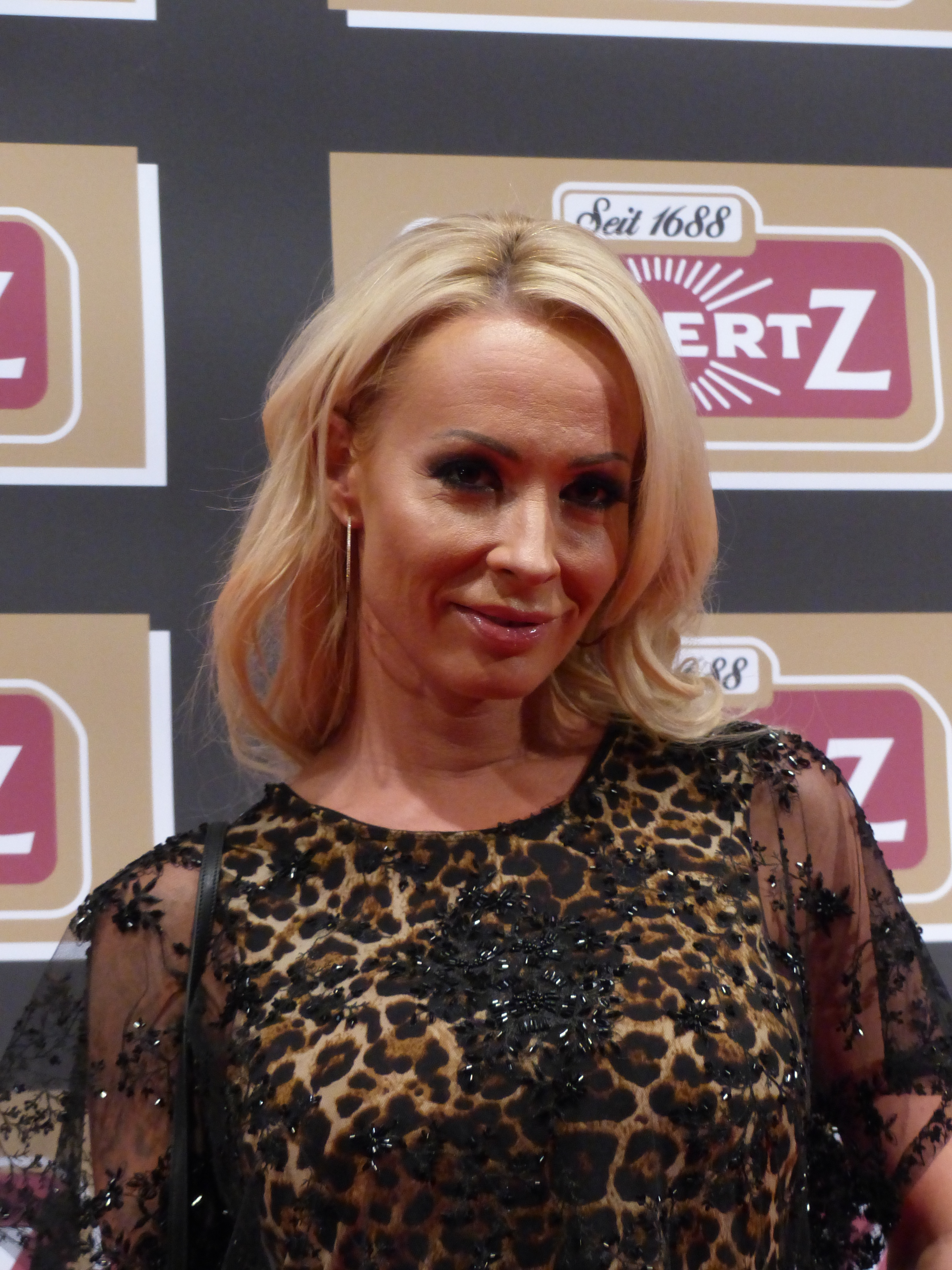
- Schumacher in 2016
- Born: Cora-Caroline Brinkmann; 27 December 1976 (age 49); Langenfeld, North Rhine-Westphalia, West Germany
- Occupations: Television personality; model; actress; presenter; racing driver
- Years active: 2001–present
- Spouse: Ralf Schumacher (m. 2001; div. 2015)
- Children: David Schumacher
- Relatives: Michael Schumacher (brother-in-law); Corinna Schumacher (sister-in-law); Mick Schumacher (nephew); Gina-Maria Bethke (niece)

Cora-Caroline Brinkmann Schumacher (née Brinkmann; born 27 December 1976) is a German television and media personality. She is best known for her former marriage to racing driver Ralf Schumacher. She has featured on German television programmes such as Top of the Pops, Marienhof, Let's Dance and Alarm für Cobra 11 – Die Autobahnpolizei, and featured on the cover of the GQ, Maxim and Playboy magazines.

== Early life ==
Cora Brinkmann was born on 27 December 1976 in Langenfeld, Rhineland. She is daughter of the petrol station owner Gerd Brinkmann and his wife Ingrid. After Brinkmann graduated from high school, she studied as a communications specialist and also worked as a model. She lived in the German capital of Berlin for a short period of time in 2000, where she worked as a sales representative for the retail clothing company Diesel.

== Career ==
In May 2001, nude photographs of Schumacher that were taken by Jens Brüggemann for an unpublished book were published in the German tabloid press. She later featured on the cover of the German edition of GQ on its October 2003 issue.

Schumacher began her racing career by entering the Mini Challenge Deutschland in 2004. She completed her first two races in 22nd and 18th positions. After the rounds, Schumacher temporarily stood down from driving duties to care for her husband Ralf Schumacher, who sustained two fractures to his thoracic vertebrae in a heavy accident at the 2004 United States Grand Prix. She returned to the cockpit soon after, finishing the season 27th in the points standings. Schumacher continued to complete in the Mini Challenge Deutschland in 2005; her performance diminished, finishing 34th in the Drivers' Championship. That same year, she was a co-host of the music chart television series Top of the Pops, and she was featured on the German edition of Maxim in September.

For the 2006 season, Schumacher moved to participating in the SEAT León Supercopa. According to the German media, the contract she signed to compete in the championship made her the country's fourth-highest paid driver. Due to periostitis on the back that caused Schumacher to feel pain under braking, she was limited to two races, and her car was driven by the television presenter Christina Surer. In 2006, she was the German voice dub for the characters Mia and Tia in the animated film Cars.

She spent the next four years out of competitive motor racing. Schumacher undertook television work for the Deutsche Tourenwagen Masters, and portrayed the rally driver Carina Schuster in three episodes of the Das Erste soap opera Marienhof in April 2009. She returned to motorsport when she joined the Lechner Racing School team for the second half of the Mini Challenge Deutschland series in 2010. Schumacher tested at the Hockenheimring to reacquaint herself with driving. In 2011, she continued to race in the Mini Challenge, this time with the Piro Sports team after she was contacted by driver Franjo Kovac, finishing a career-high 14th in the final drivers' championship standings. That year, she made her debut in endurance racing, partnering Kovac, Martin Tschornia, Rainald Mattes and Christian Leutheuser in a Besaplast Racing Team 2-entered No. 35 BMW Mini Cooper S, finishing second in the A2 class and 30th overall.

Schumacher began the 2012 season competing in the Dubai 24 Hour, again with the Bestaplast Racing Team. Partnering Kovac, Tschornia, Fredrik Lestrup and Reinhard Nehls in a BMW Mini, the quintet won the A2 category. In March, she was invited to test a Chevrolet Camaro GT3 on behalf of YACO Racing for ADAC GT Masters development work at the Circuit Paul Ricard. Schumacher moved to the Mini Trophy for the year, finishing with 85 points and a final placing of 15th in the drivers' championship. In late March 2014, after some time away from driving, she tested a Seyffarth Motorsport-run Mercedes-Benz SLS AMG GT3 at the Hockenheimring.

Schumacher was one of fourteen celebrities announced as taking part in the eighth season of the dance competition Let's Dance in March 2015. She was partnered with the professional choreographer Erich Klann; the couple were eliminated in the competition's second week. Schumacher appeared on the German edition of the magazine Playboy in June 2015. She entered the three races of the 2016 Deutscher Tourenwagen Cup, driving a Mini Cooper for Caisley AEG ID in the Production 1 category, and taking three podium finishes for a sixth place standing in the final drivers' championship standings. In October 2016, she had a cameo as the nurse Susi Tanne in the RTL police procedural Alarm für Cobra 11 – Die Autobahnpolizei.

She had been due to compete in the 2017 Dubai 24 Hour until she withdrew due to a biceps tendon rupture she sustained in October 2016. Nevertheless, Schumacher recovered to take part in four rounds of the 2017 GT4 European Series Northern Cup, sharing a Porsche Cayman GT4 Clubsport MR entered by the Besagroup Racing Team with Franjo Kovac in the AM Cup class. She finished the season 13th in the class drivers' championship with 46 points. Schumacher remained with the Besagroup team for the 2018 season. She shared a Mercedes-AMG GT R SP-X with Kovac, Roland Asch, Sebastian Asch and Fidel Leib at the Dubai 24 Hour, finishing fourth in the GT4 category and 33rd overall. For two rounds of the 2018 GT4 Central European Cup, she scored 34 points and finished tenth in the AM class drivers' championship.

On 17 August 2018, Schumacher was confirmed as a contestant on the sixth series of the reality television programme Promi Big Brother. The public voted to evict her from the house ten days later. Schumacher was the main participant in the television dating programme Cora's House of Love in 2020 in which she reviews the qualities of ten men and which one she felt she would be most suited to. The following year, she was featured in an episode of RTL's Die Superhändler – 4 Räume, 1 Deal in which she sold a racing suit belonging to her former spouse. Schumacher was a finalist on the 2022 series of Sat.1's reality television programme Club der guten Laune. In 2024, she was featured as a contestant on RTL's Ich bin ein Star – Holt mich hier raus! but she voluntarily left the show after three days. Schumacher was one of five team members of Team VIP Area on the RTL game show Splash! - Das Promi Pool Quiz that year.

== Personality and personal life ==
Schumacher has described herself as a quiet individual in public, and was reticent towards the press in her early years. From October 2001 to February 2015, she was married to the Formula One racing driver Ralf Schumacher, who is a younger brother to seven-time Formula One world champion Michael Schumacher. They have a son David, who grew up as a racing driver, following his father's and uncle's footsteps.

== Filmography ==
- Cars (2006) (Voice in German dub)
- Marienhof (2009)
- Let's Dance (2015)
- Alarm für Cobra 11 – Die Autobahnpolizei (2016)
- Promi Big Brother (2018)
