= Corinna Schumacher =

German equestrian (born 1969)

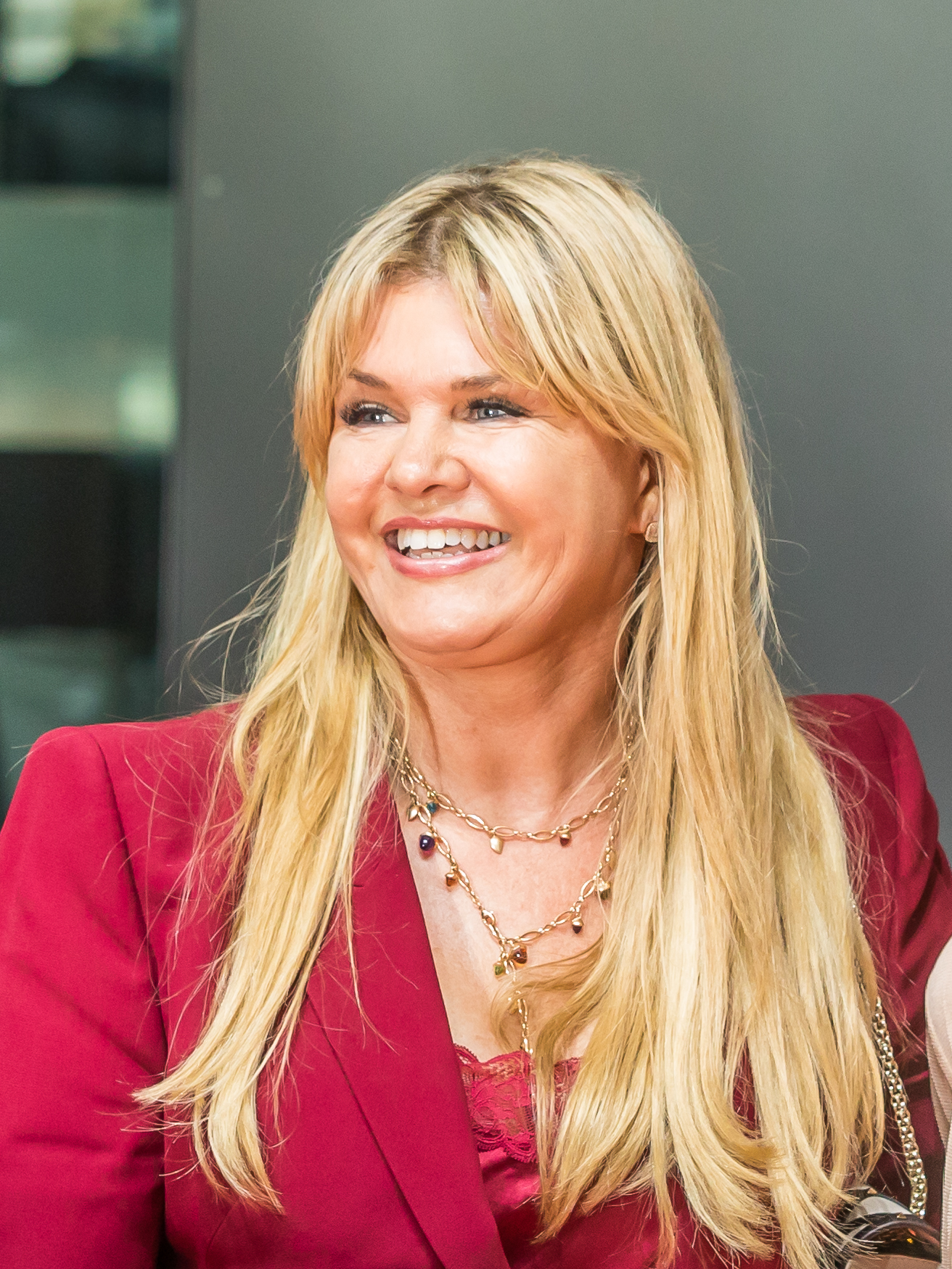
- Schumacher in 2022
- Born: Corinna Betsch; 2 March 1969 (age 57); Halver, North Rhine-Westphalia, West Germany
- Occupation: Horsewoman
- Spouse: Michael Schumacher (m. 1995)
- Children: Gina-Maria Bethke; Mick Schumacher
- Relatives: Ralf Schumacher (brother-in-law); Cora Schumacher (sister-in-law); David Schumacher (nephew); Sebastian Stahl (step-brother-in-law

Corinna Betsch Schumacher (née Betsch; born 2 March 1969) is a German champion equestrian. She is married to German former racing driver Michael Schumacher.

== Personal life ==
A horsewoman, in 2010 Schumacher won the European Championship in western style horse riding. In 1997, she gave birth to a daughter, Gina-Maria, who is a professional equestrian, and in 1999, a son Mick, who is a professional racing driver and has competed in Formula One following the footsteps of his father and uncle.

She is married to German seven-time Formula One champion Michael Schumacher and sister-in-law to former Formula One driver Ralf Schumacher. Corinna and Michael were married in Germany in August 1995. Before she married Michael, she was in a relationship with Heinz-Harald Frentzen in the early 1990s.

The Schumachers own horse ranches in Texas, as well as in Switzerland. The CS Ranch, located in Gordonville, Texas, deals in all aspects of the reining industry, focusing mainly on training and showing. CS Ranch accepts a select number of outside horses into their training programme.
