= 2019–20 MRF Challenge Formula 2000 Championship =

Auto racing championship in India

The 2019–20 MRF Challenge Formula 2000 Championship was the seventh running of the MRF Challenge Formula 2000 Championship. It began on 22 November 2019 at the Dubai Autodrome, United Arab Emirates, and finished on February 16 2020 at the Madras Motor Race Track in Chennai, India. The series was held over 15 races spanning three meetings.

== Drivers ==
The following drivers contested the championship:

No.	Driver	Rounds
3	(Australia) Dylan Young	All
6	(India) Chetan Korada	All
8	(Belgium) Michelangelo Amendola	All
10	(Netherlands) Bent Viscaal	2
13	(United States) Reece Ushijima	All
21	(United Kingdom) Josh Mason	All
26	(United Kingdom) Louis Foster	3
27	(Germany) David Schumacher	2
29	(United States) Yuven Sundaramoorthy	All
71	(Jordan) Manaf Hijjawi	All
85	(Denmark) Valdemar Eriksen	All
99	(Denmark) Largim Ali	All

== Calendar and results ==
Round		Circuit	Date	Pole position	Fastest lap	Winning driver	Source
2019
1	R1	(United Arab Emirates) Dubai Autodrome, Dubai	22 November	(Belgium) Michelangelo Amendola	(Belgium) Michelangelo Amendola	(Belgium) Michelangelo Amendola	
1	R2	(United Arab Emirates) Dubai Autodrome, Dubai	22 November		(Belgium) Michelangelo Amendola	(Belgium) Michelangelo Amendola	
1	R3	(United Arab Emirates) Dubai Autodrome, Dubai	23 November	(Belgium) Michelangelo Amendola	(Belgium) Michelangelo Amendola	(Australia) Dylan Young	
1	R4	(United Arab Emirates) Dubai Autodrome, Dubai	23 November		(United States) Reece Ushijima	(United States) Yuven Sundaramoorthy	
1	R5	(United Arab Emirates) Dubai Autodrome, Dubai	23 November	(United States) Reece Ushijima	(United States) Reece Ushijima	(Belgium) Michelangelo Amendola	
2	R1	Bahrain International Circuit, Sakhir	13 December	(Germany) David Schumacher	(Netherlands) Bent Viscaal	(Netherlands) Bent Viscaal	
2	R2	Bahrain International Circuit, Sakhir	13 December		(Germany) David Schumacher	(Germany) David Schumacher	
2	R3	Bahrain International Circuit, Sakhir	14 December	(Germany) David Schumacher	(Netherlands) Bent Viscaal	(Netherlands) Bent Viscaal	
2	R4	Bahrain International Circuit, Sakhir	14 December		(Germany) David Schumacher	(Australia) Dylan Young	
2020
3	R1	(India) Madras Motor Race Track, Chennai	15 February	(Belgium) Michelangelo Amendola	(Belgium) Michelangelo Amendola	(Belgium) Michelangelo Amendola	
3	R2	(India) Madras Motor Race Track, Chennai	15 February		(United Kingdom) Louis Foster	(Jordan) Manaf Hijjawi	
3	R3	(India) Madras Motor Race Track, Chennai	15 February	(Belgium) Michelangelo Amendola	(Belgium) Michelangelo Amendola	(Belgium) Michelangelo Amendola	
3	R4	(India) Madras Motor Race Track, Chennai	16 February		(United States) Yuven Sundaramoorthy	(United States) Yuven Sundaramoorthy	
3	R5	(India) Madras Motor Race Track, Chennai	16 February	(United States) Yuven Sundaramoorthy	(United Kingdom) Louis Foster	(United Kingdom) Louis Foster	
3	R6	(India) Madras Motor Race Track, Chennai	16 February		(United States) Yuven Sundaramoorthy	(Australia) Dylan Young	

== Championship standings ==
Scoring system

Position	1st	2nd	3rd	4th	5th	6th	7th	8th	9th	10th	R1 PP	FL
Points	25	18	15	12	10	8	6	4	2	1	2	2

Drivers' standings

Pos.	Driver	DUB (United Arab Emirates)					BHR (Bahrain)				CHE (India)						Points
1	(Belgium) Michelangelo Amendola	1	1	2	2	1	7	8	6	7	1	5	1	6	3	3	247
2	(Australia) Dylan Young	3	Ret	1	5	3	4	3	5	1	2	4	2	3	6	1	223
3	(United Kingdom) Josh Mason	2	2	3	6	2	5	4	4	8	3	2	4	4	Ret	8	176
4	(Jordan) Manaf Hijjawi	8	3	4	4	7	9	7	4	2	6	1	5	2	Ret	DNS	148
5	(Denmark) Valdemar Eriksen	5	6	6	3	4	3	6	10	5	5	3	8	8	5	2	148
6	(United States) Yuven Sundaramoorthy	7	Ret	5	1	6	Ret	9	3	8	10	7	6	1	2	7	138
7	(United States) Reece Ushijima	6	5	7	7	5	6	5	7	9	8	8	9	9	4	5	104
8	(Denmark) Largim Ali	4	4	8	DNS	DNS	8	10	9	6	7	6	7	7	7	6	83
9	(Germany) David Schumacher						2	1	2	3							82
10	(United Kingdom) Louis Foster										4	10	3	5	1	4	79
11	(Netherlands) Bent Viscaal						1	2	1	Ret							72
12	(India) Chetan Korada	9	7	9	8	8	Ret	11	11	10	9	9	10	10	8	9	31
