= David Schumacher (racing driver) =

German racing driver (born 2001)

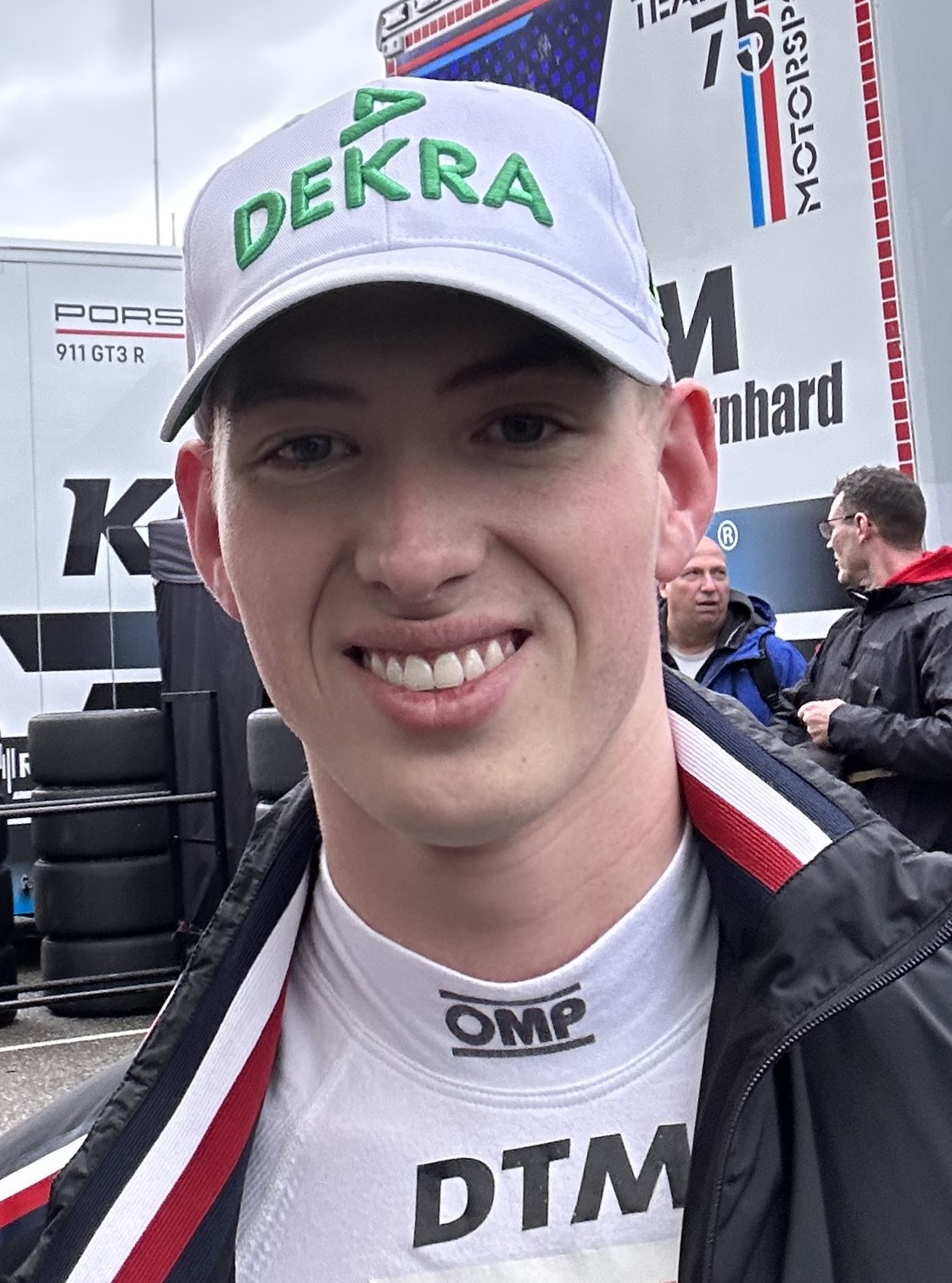
- Schumacher in 2023
- Nationality: (Germany) German
- Born: 23 October 2001 (age 25) Salzburg, Austria
- Spouse: Vivien Keszthelyi (m. 2026)
- Parents: Ralf Schumacher (father); Cora Schumacher (mother)
- Relatives: Michael Schumacher (uncle); Corinna Schumacher (aunt); Mick Schumacher (cousin)

GT World Challenge Europe Endurance Cup career
- Debut season: 2025
- Current team: HRT Ford Performance racing team
- Categorisation: FIA Silver
- Car number: 65
- Starts: 1
- Wins: 0
- Podiums: 0
- Poles: 0
- Fastest laps: 0
- Best finish: TBD in 2025

Previous series
- 2019–2022 2019 2018 2018 2017–18: ADAC GT Masters; FIA Formula 3 FR European Championship; Euroformula Open; ADAC Formula 4 Formula 4 UAE Championship

David Schumacher (born 23 October 2001) is a German racing driver competing in the 2025 GT World Challenge Europe Endurance Cup with HRT Ford Performance racing team. A member of the Schumacher racing family, he is the son of former Formula One driver Ralf Schumacher, nephew of seven-time Formula One world champion Michael Schumacher and his wife Corinna, a Western riding European Champion, and the cousin to racing driver Mick Schumacher and Western riding Gina-Maria Bethke.

== Early career ==
=== Karting career ===
Schumacher began karting at a young age, alongside his cousin Mick. From there, he competed in multiple karting championships under his mother's maiden name Brinkmann. In 2017, David's last year in karts, he chose to race with the Schumacher name and finished as runner-up in the DKM Championship to Dennis Hauger in the senior class.

=== Lower formula ===
In August 2017, it was announced that Schumacher would graduate to single-seaters, competing for his father's US Racing outfit in the 2018 ADAC Formula 4 Championship. In January 2018, he made his single-seater debut, contesting the Formula 4 UAE Championship with Rasgaira Motorsports Team from the second round onwards. Claiming three wins, Schumacher ended the season as vice-champion to Charles Weerts.

In ADAC Formula 4, Schumacher scored a consistent string of points finishes, with three fourth places being his best finishes, and ended the season ninth in the championship. His results translated into eight race wins in the Rookies' Cup and he claimed the title of rookie champion.

=== Euroformula Open Championship & Asian F3 Winter Series ===
Schumacher competed in the final two rounds of the 2018 Euroformula Open Championship with RP Motorsport. He was ineligible to score points as a guest driver, but claimed two fourth-place finishes at the Circuit de Barcelona-Catalunya. These results placed him sixth in the Spanish Formula 3 championship, which is made up of three rounds from the Euroformula Open championship.

In January 2019, Schumacher was named as part of Pinnacle Motorsport's three car line-up for the Asian F3 Winter Series. He competed in two of the championship's three rounds, taking a podium finish at the Buriram International Circuit and finishing eighth in the championship.

=== Formula Regional European Championship ===
In March 2019, it was announced that Schumacher would compete in the inaugural season of the Formula Regional European Championship, returning to the US Racing team co-owned by his father. He claimed four race victories over the season, including two consecutively at the Circuit de Barcelona-Catalunya, as well as five other podium finishes, five pole positions and three fastest laps. He ended the season 4th in the championship.

=== FIA Formula 3 Championship ===
==== 2019 ====
In September 2019, Schumacher made his debut in the FIA Formula 3 Championship, standing in at Campos Racing for the injured Alex Peroni at the final round in Sochi. Schumacher finished the two races in 22nd and 20th. Schumacher made his first appearance at the Macau Grand Prix in November, racing for Sauber Junior Team by Charouz. He placed 23rd in qualifying, fell back to 25th in the qualifying race and finished 21st in the main race. In December he took part in the second round of the MRF Challenge Formula 2000 series at Bahrain International Circuit, taking both pole positions of the weekend and finishing all four races on the podium, including a victory in the second race.

==== 2020 ====
In February 2020, it was confirmed that Schumacher would return to the FIA Formula 3 Championship, racing full-time with Charouz Racing System. However, following the Spanish round, he left Charouz to join Carlin Racing. He did not score any points, had a best finish of 12th at the Austria feature race, and finished the championship in 28th place.

==== 2021 ====
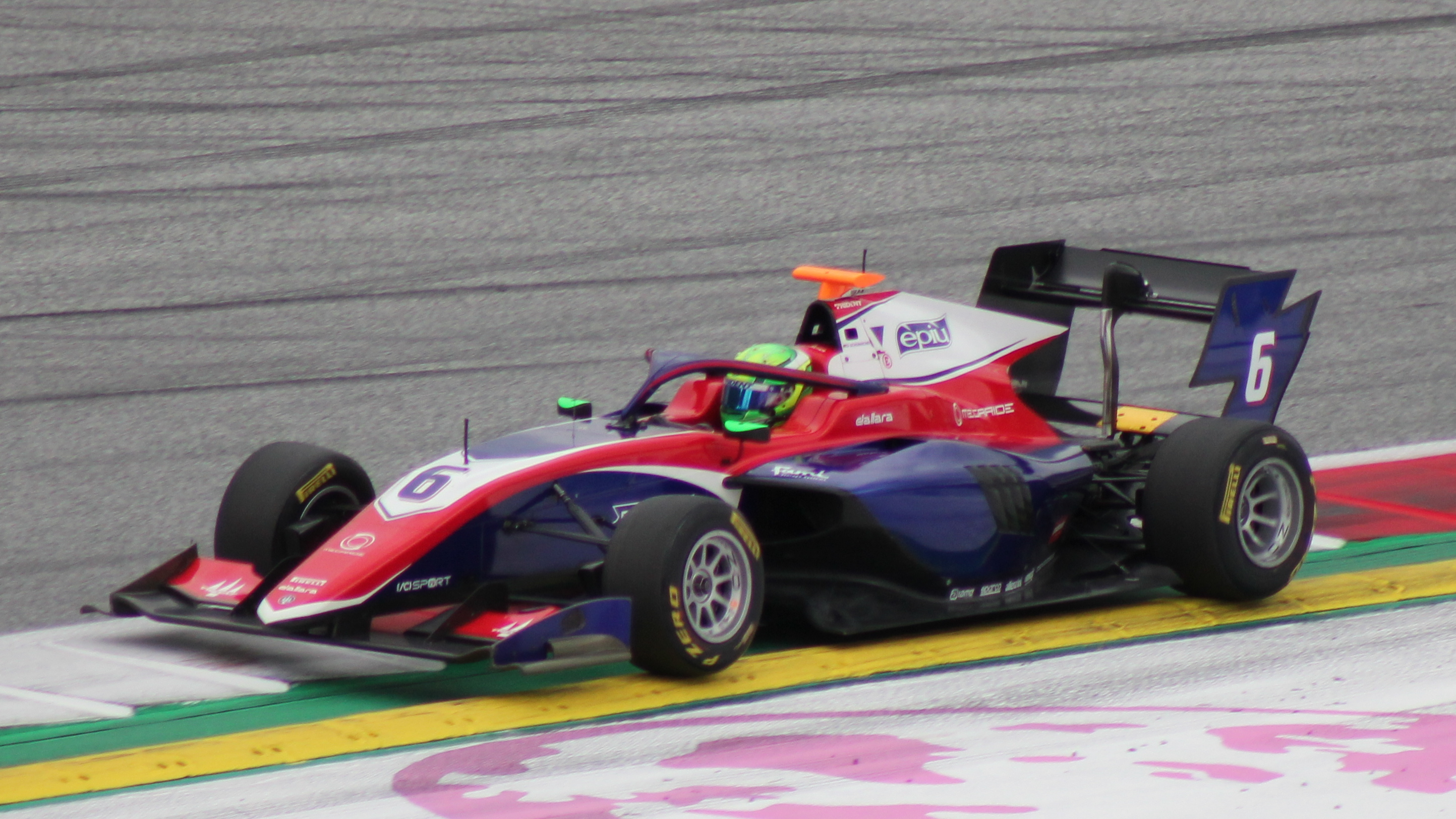
Schumacher at the 2021 Spielberg Formula 3 round

In February 2021, it was announced that Schumacher would race for Trident Racing in the 2021 season. On 4 July 2021 he achieved his first FIA F3 points, podium and victory in race 2 of the third round at the Red Bull Ring, having started the race from reverse-grid pole. Throughout the next two rounds, the German would go on to finish in the points in all but one race, even scoring his second podium of the year in the second race at Spa-Francorchamps, where he and teammate Jack Doohan gave Trident their first one-two finish in their Formula 3 history. At Zandvoort, Schumacher qualified a career best of second, behind Dennis Hauger. During the feature race, with three laps to go, Schumacher was running in second place until Victor Martins made a failed attempt to pass Schumacher, taking him out while trying to overtake him. Schumacher's fifth place the race before proved to be his last points finish during the season, as he finished 14th and 15th in the final round. He ended the season with just 55 points, compared to his teammates Doohan and Novalak with 179 and 147 points respectively. He still however, helped Trident clinch the constructors' championship by four points.

==== 2022 ====
In April 2022, it was announced that Schumacher would return to Charouz Racing System, the team which he drove for in 2020, to replace Ayrton Simmons at the Imola round. He started 29th and last for both of the races, but recovered to finish 18th and 12th in the races. Due to DTM commitments, Schumacher was replaced by Lirim Zendeli for the Barcelona round. At Zandvoort, Schumacher made his second appearance of the season with Charouz, as Christian Mansell returned to his main campaign in the Euroformula Open. Schumacher once again returned to DTM that clashed with the Monza season finale and was replaced by Alessandro Famularo. Schumacher ended the championship 28th overall, highest of the non-scorers and even ahead of some full-timers.

== Sportscar career ==
=== 2022 ===
Schumacher left Formula 3 at the conclusion of the 2021 season to join the Deutsche Tourenwagen Masters for its 2022 campaign. His season started in a promising manner, qualifying tenth at the Lausitzring and eventually finishing 14th, however a flurry of retirements as a result of crashes, most notably one with three-time DTM champion René Rast at the Nürburgring, led to criticism regarding the German's driving conduct. The best result of the season came at Spa-Francorchamps, where Schumacher ended up eleventh, a mere second behind the points positions, albeit that weekend also yielded a twelve-place grid penalty for Race 2 caused by multiple track limit infractions. At the final event, he was involved in a collision with Thomas Preining, which caused a fracture of Schumacher's lumbar vertebrae. He ended the season in 28th place, having failed to score points, summing it up by stating that it "hadn't been a good season".

=== 2023 ===
After a difficult debut season in the DTM, Schumacher began competing in the GT World Challenge Europe Endurance Cup in 2023, whilst also remaining in the DTM. He competed for Winward Racing in both series, partnering Marius Zug and Miklas Born in the former. Although his DTM campaign ended with a 25th-placed result in the standings, Schumacher was able to improve his results, getting a best finish of ninth at the Nürburgring. Meanwhile, a class victory at the same track together with two further podiums allowed Schumacher, Zug, and Born to come third in the Gold Cup championship.

=== 2024 ===
In 2024, Schumacher stepped down to the silver-only ADAC GT Masters, where he would be partnering Salman Owega at the Haupt Racing Team. Having taken a pole during the opening round and a maiden podium in Zandvoort, the duo dominated the weekend at the Nürburgring by winning both races, with Schumacher having taken pole position on Sunday. Schumacher and Owega went on to collect another win at the Nurburgring and Hockenheimring, settling the championship with an overall third place finish.

=== 2025 ===
For 2025, Schumacher returned to the GT World Challenge Europe Endurance Cup, driving a Ford Mustang GT3 for the HRT Ford Performance team.

== Personal life ==
Schumacher's family includes his father, former Formula One driver Ralf, his uncle, seven-time Formula One world champion Michael, and his cousin, FIA World Endurance Championship driver Mick. In 2026, Schumacher married his long-time partner Vivien Keszthelyi.

== Karting record ==
=== Karting career summary ===
Season	Series	Team	Position
2011	Ciao Thomas Knopper Memorial — Bambini		2nd
2011	ADAC Kart Masters — Bambini		9th
2011	Euro Wintercup — Bambini		7th
2012	ADAC Kart Masters — Bambini		8th
2014	German Karting Championship — Junior		27th
2014	ADAC Kart Masters — KFJ		16th
2015	South Garda Winter Cup — KFJ	KSM Racing Team	16th
2015	WSK Super Master Series — KFJ	KSM Racing Team	32nd
2015	ADAC Kart Masters — Junior	KSM Racing Team	3rd
2015	German Karting Championship — Junior	KSM Racing Team	4th
2015	CIK-FIA World Championship — KFJ	KSM Racing Team	51st
2016	WSK Champions Cup — OKJ	KSM Schumacher Racing Team	31st
2016	South Garda Winter Cup — OKJ	KSM Schumacher Racing Team	NC
2016	WSK Super Master Series — OK	KSM Schumacher Racing Team	23rd
2016	CIK-FIA European Championship — OK	KSM Schumacher Racing Team	22nd
2016	German Karting Championship — Senior	KSM Schumacher Racing Team	6th
2016	CIK-FIA World Championship — OK	KSM Schumacher Racing Team	20th
2017	WSK Champions Cup — OK	KSM Schumacher Racing Team	21st
2017	South Garda Winter Cup — OK	KSM Schumacher Racing Team	27th
2017	WSK Super Master Series — OK	KSM Schumacher Racing Team	14th
2017	German Karting Championship — Senior	KSM Schumacher Racing Team	2nd
2017	CIK-FIA European Championship — OK	KSM Schumacher Racing Team	13th
2019	South Garda Winter Cup — OK		70th

== Racing record ==
=== Racing career summary ===
Season	Series	Team	Races	Wins	Poles	F/Laps	Podiums	Points	Position
2017–18	Formula 4 UAE Championship	Rasgaira Motorsports Team	20	3	5	4	16	325	**2nd**
2018	ADAC Formula 4 Championship	US Racing–CHRS	20	0	0	0	0	103	9th
2018	Euroformula Open Championship	RP Motorsport	4	0	0	0	0	0	NC†
2018	Spanish Formula 3 Championship	RP Motorsport	4	0	0	0	0	38	6th
2019	Formula Regional European Championship	US Racing	24	4	5	3	9	285	4th
2019	F3 Asian Winter Series	Pinnacle Motorsport	6	0	0	0	1	43	8th
2019	FIA Formula 3 Championship	Campos Racing	2	0	0	0	0	0	32nd
2019	Macau Grand Prix	Sauber Junior Team by Charouz	1	0	0	0	0	—N/a	21st
2019–20	MRF Challenge Formula 2000	MRF Racing	4	1	2	2	4	82	9th
2020	FIA Formula 3 Championship	Charouz Racing System	12	0	0	0	0	0	28th
2020	FIA Formula 3 Championship	Carlin Buzz Racing	6	0	0	0	0	0	28th
2021	FIA Formula 3 Championship	Trident	20	1	0	0	2	55	11th
2022	Deutsche Tourenwagen Masters	Mercedes-AMG Team Winward	15	0	0	0	0	0	28th
2022	FIA Formula 3 Championship	Charouz Racing System	4	0	0	0	0	0	28th
2023	Deutsche Tourenwagen Masters	Mercedes-AMG Team Winward	16	0	0	0	0	16	25th
2023	GT World Challenge Europe Endurance Cup	Winward Racing	5	0	0	0	0	9	17th
2023	GT World Challenge Europe Endurance Cup - Gold Cup	Winward Racing	5	1	1	0	3	88	**3rd**
2024	ADAC GT Masters	Haupt Racing Team	12	3	2	2	5	172	**3rd**
2024	Nürburgring Langstrecken-Serie - BMW M240i	Teichmann Racing	2	0	0	0	0	0	NC†
2024	Nürburgring Langstrecken-Serie - SP9	Team ADVAN x HRT	2	1	0	0	1	0	NC†
2024	Prototype Cup Germany	US Racing	2	2	2	2	2	0	NC†
2024	24 Hours of Nürburgring - SP10	Schnitzelalm Racing	1	0	0	0	1	—N/a	**3rd**
2025	Nürburgring Langstrecken-Serie - SP9	HRT Ford Performance	2	0	0	0	0	0	NC†
2025	24 Hours of Nürburgring - SP9 Pro-Am	HRT Ford Performance	1	1	0	0	1	—N/a	**1st**
2025	GT World Challenge Europe Endurance Cup	HRT Ford Performance	5	0	0	0	0	0	NC
2025	GT World Challenge Europe Endurance Cup - Silver Cup	HRT Ford Performance	5	0	0	0	0	38	11th
2025	ADAC GT Masters	Haupt Racing Team	2	0	1	1	1	38	15th
2026	Nürburgring Langstrecken-Serie - SP9	HRT Ford Racing							
2026	24 Hours of Nürburgring - SP9 Pro-Am	HRT Ford Racing	1	0	1	0	0	—N/a	DNF
2026	GT Summer Series - GT3	Haupt Racing Team							
2026–27	Asian Le Mans Series - GT3	Haupt Racing Team							

^{†} As Schumacher was a guest driver, he was ineligible for points.

=== Complete Formula 4 UAE Championship results ===
(key) (Races in bold indicate pole position; races in italics indicate fastest lap)

Year	Team	1	2	3	4	5	6	7	8	9	10	11	12	13	14	15	16	17	18	19	20	21	22	23	24	DC	Points
2017–18	Rasgaira Motorsports Team	YMC1; 1	YMC1; 2	YMC1; 3	YMC1; 4	**YMC2**; **1**; 3	YMC2; 2; 2	YMC2; 3; 2	YMC2; 4; 2	**DUB1**; **1**; 2	DUB1; 2; 1	**DUB1**; **3**; 6	DUB1; 4 C	YMC3; 1; 3	YMC3; 2; 1	YMC3; 3; 5	YMC3; 4; 1	**YMC4**; **1**; 2	YMC4; 2; 2	**YMC4**; **3**; 2	YMC4; 4; 3	DUB2; 1; 2	DUB2; 2; 6	DUB2; 3; 2	DUB2; 4; 3	2nd	325

=== Complete ADAC Formula 4 Championship results ===
(key) (Races in bold indicate pole position) (Races in italics indicate fastest lap)

Year	Team	1	2	3	4	5	6	7	8	9	10	11	12	13	14	15	16	17	18	19	20	Pos	Points
2018	US Racing–CHRS	OSC; 1; 5	OSC; 2; 13	OSC; 3; 13	HOC1; 1; 4	HOC1; 2; 9	HOC1; 3; 15	LAU; 1; 9	LAU; 2; 7	LAU; 3; 18	RBR; 1; 6	RBR; 2 Ret	RBR; 3; 7	HOC2; 1; 5	HOC2; 2; 12	NÜR; 1; 4	NÜR; 2; 4	NÜR; 3; 8	HOC3; 1; 6	HOC3; 2; 14	HOC3; 3; 5	9th	103

=== Complete Formula Regional European Championship results ===
(key) (Races in bold indicate pole position; races in italics indicate fastest lap)

Year	Entrant	1	2	3	4	5	6	7	8	9	10	11	12	13	14	15	16	17	18	19	20	21	22	23	24	25	DC	Points
2019	US Racing	LEC; 1; 8	LEC; 2; 6	LEC; 3; 3	**VLL**; **1**; 1	VLL; 2; 7	VLL; 3 C	HUN; 1; 6	HUN; 2; 5	HUN; 3; 7	RBR; 1; 3	RBR; 2; 2	RBR; 3; 6	IMO; 1; 8	IMO; 2; 5	IMO; 3; 6	IMO; 4; 4	CAT; 1; 3	**CAT**; **2**; 1	**CAT**; **3**; 1	MUG; 1; 2	**MUG**; **2**; 14	**MUG**; **3**; 1	MNZ; 1; 7	MNZ; 2; 7	MNZ; 3; 6	4th	285

=== Complete F3 Asian Winter Series results ===
(key) (Races in bold indicate pole position) (Races in italics indicate fastest lap)

Year	Team	1	2	3	4	5	6	7	8	9	Pos	Points
2019	Pinnacle Motorsport	CHA; 1; 7	CHA; 2; 3	CHA; 3; 5	SEP1; 1; 7	SEP1; 2; 7	SEP1; 3 Ret	SEP2; 1	SEP2; 2	SEP2; 3	8th	43

=== Complete FIA Formula 3 Championship results ===
(key) (Races in bold indicate pole position; races in italics indicate points for the fastest lap of top ten finishers)

Year	Entrant	1	2	3	4	5	6	7	8	9	10	11	12	13	14	15	16	17	18	19	20	21	DC	Points
2019	Campos Racing	CAT; FEA	CAT; SPR	LEC; FEA	LEC; SPR	RBR; FEA	RBR; SPR	SIL; FEA	SIL; SPR	HUN; FEA	HUN; SPR	SPA; FEA	SPA; SPR	MNZ; FEA	MNZ; SPR	SOC; FEA; 22	SOC; SPR; 20						32nd	0
2020	Charouz Racing System	RBR; FEA; 25	RBR; SPR; 15	RBR; FEA; 12	RBR; SPR; 17	HUN; FEA; 16	HUN; SPR; 13	SIL; FEA; 25	SIL; SPR; 15	SIL; FEA; 15	SIL; SPR; Ret	CAT; FEA; 23	CAT; SPR; 25										28th	0
2020	Carlin Buzz Racing													SPA; FEA; 17	SPA; SPR; 14	MNZ; FEA; 19	MNZ; SPR; Ret	MUG; FEA; 15	MUG; SPR; 19				28th	0
2021	Trident	CAT; 1; 11	CAT; 2 Ret	CAT; 3; 12	LEC; 1; 16	LEC; 2; 11	LEC; 3; 27	RBR; 1; 12	RBR; 2; 1	RBR; 3; 11	HUN; 1; 8	HUN; 2; 6	HUN; 3; 4	SPA; 1; 11	SPA; 2; 2	SPA; 3; 9	ZAN; 1; 14	ZAN; 2; 5	ZAN; 3; 30†	SOC; 1; 14	SOC; 2 C	SOC; 3; 15	11th	55
2022	Charouz Racing System	BHR; SPR	BHR; FEA	IMO; SPR; 18	IMO; FEA; 12	CAT; SPR	CAT; FEA	SIL; SPR	SIL; FEA	RBR; SPR	RBR; FEA	HUN; SPR	HUN; FEA	SPA; SPR	SPA; FEA	ZAN; SPR; 20	ZAN; FEA; 15	MNZ; SPR	MNZ; SPR				28th	0

^{†} Driver did not finish the race, but was classified as they completed more than 90% of the race distance.

=== Complete Macau Grand Prix results ===
Year	Team	Car	Qualifying	Quali Race	Main race
2019	(Czech Republic) Sauber Junior Team by Charouz	Dallara F3 2019	23rd	25th	21st

=== Complete MRF Challenge Formula 2000 Championship results ===
(key) (Races in bold indicate pole position; races in italics indicate fastest lap)

Year	1	2	3	4	5	6	7	8	9	10	11	12	13	14	15	DC	Points
2019-20	DUB; 1	DUB; 2	DUB; 3	DUB; 4	DUB; 5	**BHR**; **1**; 2	BHR; 2; 1	**BHR**; **3**; 2	BHR; 4; 3	CHE; 1	CHE; 2	CHE; 3	CHE; 4	CHE; 5	CHE; 6	9th	82

=== Complete Deutsche Tourenwagen Masters results ===
(key) (Races in bold indicate pole position) (Races in italics indicate fastest lap)

Year	Entrant	Chassis	1	2	3	4	5	6	7	8	9	10	11	12	13	14	15	16	Rank	Points
2022	Mercedes-AMG Team Winward	Mercedes-AMG GT3 Evo	ALG; 1; 20	ALG; 2; 15	LAU; 1 Ret	LAU; 2; 14	IMO; 1; 21	IMO; 2 Ret	NOR; 1 Ret	NOR; 2 Ret	NÜR; 1 Ret	NÜR; 2 Ret	SPA; 1; 11	SPA; 2; 20	RBR; 1; 16	RBR; 2; 24	HOC; 1 Ret	HOC; 2 DNS	28th	0
2023	Mercedes-AMG Team Winward	Mercedes-AMG GT3 Evo	OSC; 1; 18	OSC; 2; 13	ZAN; 1 Ret	ZAN; 2; 15	NOR; 1; 16	NOR; 2 Ret	NÜR; 1 Ret	NÜR; 2; 9	LAU; 1 DSQ	LAU; 2 Ret	SAC; 1; 17	SAC; 2; 11	RBR; 1; 18	RBR; 2; 18	HOC; 1; 18	HOC; 2; 16	25th	16

=== Complete GT World Challenge results ===
==== GT World Challenge Europe Endurance Cup ====
(Races in bold indicate pole position) (Races in italics indicate fastest lap)

Year	Team	Car	Class	1	2	3	4	5	6	7	Pos.	Points
2023	Winward Racing	Mercedes-AMG GT3 Evo	Gold	MNZ; 26	LEC; 10	SPA; 6H; 22	SPA; 12H; 58†	SPA; 24H; Ret	**NÜR**; 6	CAT; 14	3rd	88
2025	HRT Ford Performance	Ford Mustang GT3	Silver	LEC; 34	MNZ; 19	SPA; 6H; 29	SPA; 12H; 30	SPA; 24H; 35†	NÜR; 20	BAR; 43	11th	38

^{*}Season still in progress.

=== Complete ADAC GT Masters results ===
(key) (Races in bold indicate pole position) (Races in italics indicate fastest lap)

Year	Team	Car	1	2	3	4	5	6	7	8	9	10	11	12	DC	Points
2024	Haupt Racing Team	Mercedes-AMG GT3 Evo	OSC; 1; 6	**OSC**; **2** Ret^{1}	ZAN; 1; 6^{2}	ZAN; 2; 3	NÜR; 1; 1	**NÜR**; **2**; 1^{1}	SPA; 1 Ret	SPA; 2; 7	RBR; 1; 2	RBR; 2; 1	HOC; 1; 1	HOC; 2; 7	3rd	174
2025	Haupt Racing Team	Ford Mustang GT3	LAU; 1	LAU; 2	ZAN; 1	ZAN; 2	**NÜR**; **1**; 4^{1}	NÜR; 2; 2^{2}	SAL; 1	SAL; 2	RBR; 1	RBR; 2	HOC; 1	HOC; 2	15th	38

^{*} Season still in progress.

=== Complete Nürburgring Langstrecken-Serie results ===
Year	Team	Car	Class	1	2	3	4	5	6	7	8	Pos.	Points
2024	Teichmann Racing	BMW M240i Racing Cup	BMW M240i	NLS1; 6	NLS2; 7	24H-Q1	24H-Q2	NLS3	NLS4	NLS5	NLS6	NC†	0
2024	Team Advan x HRT	Mercedes-AMG GT3 Evo	SP9	NLS1	NLS2	24H-Q1	24H-Q2	NLS3; 5	NLS4	NLS5	NLS6	*	*

^{†}As Schumacher was a guest driver, he was ineligible for points.
