= Dylan Young =

Australian racing driver

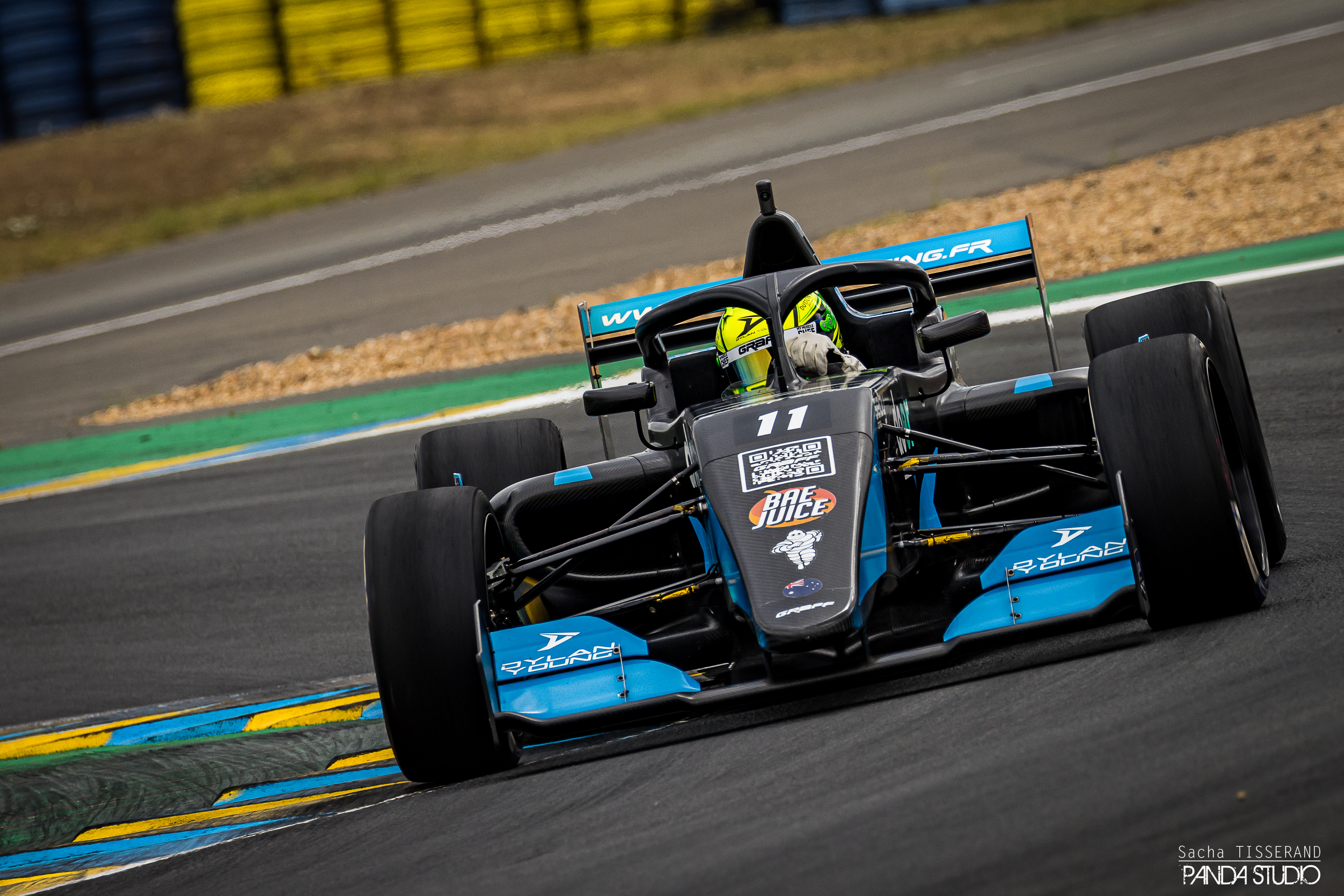
- Young at Le Mans in 2021
- Nationality: (Australia) Australian
- Born: 29 January 1989 (age 37) Melbourne, Victoria, Australia
- Categorisation: FIA Silver

Previous series
- 2024–2023 2022 2021 2020-2012 2011 2010: Ligier European Series; Ultimate Cup Series; Ultimate Cup Series; MRF Challenge Formula 2000; JK Racing Asia Series; Formula BMW Pacific

Dylan Young (born 29 January 1989) is an Australian racing driver.

Young previously competed in open-wheeler categories before moving into sports prototypes and was the runner up of the 2019-20 MRF Challenge Formula 2000 Championship.

== Career ==
=== Formula BMW Pacific ===
Young made his open-wheel debut in the 2010 Formula BMW Pacific series in Asia.

=== JK Racing Asia Series ===
In 2011, Young competed in the JK Racing Asia Series, formerly known as Formula BMW Pacific.

=== MRF Challenge ===
In 2012, Young shifted to the MRF Challenge Championship across Asia and the Middle East where he was a regular driver for a number of seasons until the 2019-20 Championship.

After two podiums in the 2013-14 Championship where he finished seventh in the standings, Young struggled for the next few seasons. It wasn't until the 2017-18 Championship that he would finish on the podium again, going on to finish eighth in the standings. A slightly improved 2018-19 season followed that resulted in two podium finishes and sixth place in the championship. In the 2019-20 Championship, Young fought for the title, standing on the podium nine times across the fifteen races. He won in Dubai, at Bahrain as a support event to the FIA World Endurance Championship, and at the final round in India. Young finished 2nd in the Championship Standings, runner up to title winner Michelangelo Amendola and ahead of 3rd placed Josh Mason.

=== GP3 ===
Young had a test with the Hilmer Motorsport squad during the official 2014 GP3 Series Tests at the Yas Marina Circuit in Abu Dhabi.

=== Ultimate Cup Series ===
Young moved into Formula Regional machinery for the 2021 season in the European Ultimate Cup Series F3 Regional Class, driving for French team Graff Racing. He only competed in half the season, but managed six podiums in a row at the Paul Ricard and Le Mans events. He also set the fastest lap in Race 3 of the Paul Ricard round, finishing in second place ahead of 24 Hours of Le Mans class winner Nico Prost.

Young stayed in the series for 2022, but again only competed in half the season.

=== Sportscars ===
In 2023, Young transitioned from open-wheelers to sports car racing, moving into the Ligier European Series in the JS P4 Prototype. He competed in a partial season, with a best result of seventh.

Young returned to the JS P4 Class for the 2024 Ligier European Series, with a best finish of sixth place.

== Racing record ==
=== Racing career summary ===
Season	Series	Team	Races	Poles	Wins	F/Laps	Podiums	Points	Position
2010	Formula BMW Pacific	Motaworld Racing	4	0	0	0	0	0	21st
2011	JK Racing Asia Series	Atlantic Racing Team	4	0	0	0	0	9	15th
2012-13	MRF Challenge Formula 2000 Championship	MRF Racing	6	0	0	0	0	3	22nd
2013-14	MRF Challenge Formula 2000 Championship	MRF Racing	14	0	0	0	2	45	7th
2014-15	MRF Challenge Formula 2000 Championship	MRF Racing	12	0	0	0	0	36	11th
2015-16	MRF Challenge Formula 2000 Championship	MRF Racing	14	0	0	0	0	32	13th
2016-17	MRF Challenge Formula 2000 Championship	MRF Racing	15	0	0	0	0	61	9th
2017-18	MRF Challenge Formula 2000 Championship	MRF Racing	16	0	0	0	1	65	8th
2018-19	MRF Challenge Formula 2000 Championship	MRF Racing	15	0	0	0	2	125	6th
2019-20	MRF Challenge Formula 2000 Championship	MRF Racing	15	0	3	0	9	223	2nd
2021	Ultimate Cup Series - Challenge Monoplace - F3	Graff Racing	9	0	0	1	6	166	11th
2022	Ultimate Cup Series - Challenge Monoplace - F3	Graff Racing	9	0	0	0	0	96	14th
2023	Ligier European Series - JS P4	Smart Driving	4	0	0	0	0	16	14th
2024	Ligier European Series - JS P4	Smart Driving	4	0	0	0	0	22	14th
