= Let's Dance (German TV series) season 8 =

Let's Dance
- Season 8
- Celebrity winner: Hans Sarpei
- Professional winner: Kathrin Menzinger
- No. of episodes: 12

Release
- Original network: RTL Television
- Original release: March 13 – June 5, 2015

Season chronology
- ← Previous; Season 7 Next → Season 9

The eight series of Let's Dance started on 13 March 2015. Sylvie Meis and Daniel Hartwich returned as hosts while Motsi Mabuse, Joachim Llambi and Jorge González also returned as the judges.

For the first time 14 couples danced on the show.

== Couples ==
Celebrity	Occupation / Known for	Professional partner	Status
Cathy Fischer	It-Girl	Marius Iepure	Eliminated 1st on March 13, 2015
Cora Schumacher	Model	Erich Klann	Eliminated 2nd on March 20, 2015
Panagiota Petridou	Television presenter	Sergiu Luca	Eliminated 3rd on March 27, 2015
Miloš Vuković	Actor	Cathrin Hissnauer	Eliminated 4th on April 10, 2015
Detlef Steves	TV Personality	Isabel Edvardsson	Eliminated 5th on April 17, 2015
Beatrice Richter	Actress	Vadim Garbuzov	Eliminated 6th on April 24, 2015
Ralf Bauer	Actor	Oana Nechiti	Withdrew on May 4, 2015
Katja Burkard	Television presenter	Paul Lorenz	Eliminated 7th & 8th on May 8, 2015
Daniel Küblböck	Singer	Oti Mabuse	Eliminated 9th on May 15, 2015
Thomas Drechsel	Actor	Regina Murtasina	Eliminated 10th on May 22, 2015
Enissa Amani	Comedian	Christian Polanc	Eliminated 11th on May 29, 2015
Matthias Steiner	Weightlifter	Ekaterina Leonova	Third Place on June 5, 2015
Minh-Khai Phan-Thi	Actress	Massimo Sinato	Runners-Up on June 5, 2015
Hans Sarpei	Footballer	Kathrin Menzinger	Winners on June 5, 2015

== Scoring chart ==
Couple	Place	1	2	3	4	5	6	7	8	9	10	11	12
Hans & Kathrin	1	21	23	26	26	24	13	28	21+3=24	25+23=48	24+28=52	26+29+28=83	24+29+29=82
Minh-Khai & Massimo	2	16	25	30	25	23	28	29	20+2=22	16+25=41	27+25=52	25+26+28=79	25+30+30=85
Matthias & Ekaterina	3	13	17	21	15	20	13	25	27+1=28	17+20=37	14+14=28	24+28+26=78	23+29+24=76
Enissa & Christian	4	21	23	19	27	23	19	19	29+4=33	24+27=51	29+29=58	21+22+22=65	
Thomas & Regina	5	16	13	19	23	28	11	25	15+8=23	25+18=43	17+14=31		
Daniel & Otlile	6	15	16	20	12	14	19	19	19+10=29	14+17=31			
Katja & Paul	7	17	15	11	10	7	16	8	7+6=13				
Ralf & Oana	8	14	22	14	27	21	19	18					
Beatrice & Vadim	9	13	17	13	16	18	12						
Detlef & Isabel	10	7	10	13	11	11							
Miloš & Cathrin	11	21	16	12	9								
Panagiota & Sergiu	12	15	8	10									
Cora & Erich	13	9	7										
Cathy & Marius	14	9											

Red numbers indicates the lowest score for each week.
Green numbers indicates the highest score for each week.
indicates the couple eliminated that week.
indicates the returning couple that finished in the bottom two.
indicates the couple that withdrew from the competition.
indicates the couple was eliminated but later returned to the competition.
indicates the winning couple.
indicates the runner-up couple.
indicates the third-place couple.

=== Averages ===
This table only counts for dances scored on a traditional 30-points scale.

Rank by average	Place	Couple	Total	Dances	Average
1	2	Minh-Khai & Massimo	453	18	25.2
2	1	Hans & Kathrin	447	18	24.8
3	4	Enissa & Christian	356	15	23.7
4	3	Matthias & Ekaterina	370	18	20.6
5	8	Ralf & Oana	135	7	19.3
6	5	Thomas & Regina	224	12	18.7
7	6	Daniel & Otlile	165	10	16.5
8	9	Beatrice & Vadim	89	6	14.8
9	11	Miloš & Cathrin	58	4	14.5
10	7	Katja & Paul	91	8	11.4
11	12	Panagiota & Sergiu	33	3	11.0
12	10	Detlef & Isabel	52	5	10.4
13	14	Cathy & Marius	9	1	9.0
14	13	Cora & Erich	16	2	8.0

=== Highest and lowest scoring performances ===
The best and worst performances in each dance according to the judges' marks are as follows:

Dance	Best dancer(s)	Best score	Worst dancer(s)	Worst score
Cha-cha-cha	Hans Sarpei	28	Detlef Steves	7
Quickstep	Matthias Steiner	29	Katja Burkard	8
Waltz	Hans Sarpei	29	Cora Schumacher	9
Rumba	Minh-Khai Phan-Thi	29	Panagiota Petridou	8
Jive	Thomas Drechsel	28	Cora Schumacher	7
Foxtrot	Matthias Steiner	25	Thomas Drechsel	13
Tango	Minh-Khai Phan-Thi	28	Katja Burkard	8
Contemporary	Minh-Khai Phan-Thi	30	Beatrice Richter	13
Paso doble	Enissa Amani	30	Detlef Steves	11
Salsa	Enissa Amani	27	Miloš Vuković	9
Hip-Hop	Hans Sarpei	29	Katja Burkard	7
Argentine tango	Ralf Bauer	27	Thomas Drechsel	25
Samba	Enissa Amani	29	Thomas Drechsel	11
Charleston	Hans Sarpei	23	Ralf Bauer	18
Jazz	Hans Sarpei	28	Daniel Küblböck	19
Bollywood	Enissa Amani	27	Minh-Khai Phan-Thi	25
Rock n' Roll	Thomas Drechsel	18	Daniel Küblböck	17
Disco Marathon	Daniel Küblböck	10	Matthias Steiner	1
Freestyle	Minh-Khai Phan-Thi	30	Matthias Steiner	24

=== Couples' Highest and lowest scoring performances ===
According to the traditional 30-point scale.

Couples	Highest Scoring Dances	Lowest Scoring Dances
Hans & Kathrin	Waltz, Hip-Hop & Freestyle (29)	Samba (13)
Minh-Khai & Massimo	Contemporary (twice) & Freestyle (30)	Quickstep & Cha-cha-cha (16)
Matthias & Ekaterina	Quickstep (29)	Waltz & Salsa (13)
Enissa & Christian	Paso doble (30)	Tango & Rumba (19)
Thomas & Regina	Jive (28)	Samba (11)
Daniel & Otlile	Contemporary (20)	Cha-cha-cha (12)
Katja & Paul	Waltz (17)	Cha-cha-cha & Hip-Hop (7)
Ralf & Oana	Argentine tango (27)	Quickstep & Foxtrot (14)
Beatrice & Vadim	Waltz (18)	Paso doble (12)
Detlef & Isabel	Quickstep (13)	Cha-cha-cha (7)
Miloš & Cathrin	Waltz (21)	Salsa (9)
Panagiota & Sergiu	Quickstep (15)	Rumba (8)
Cora & Erich	Waltz (9)	Jive (7)
Cathy & Marius	Cha-cha-cha (9)	-

== Weekly scores and songs ==
=== Week 1: Opening Night ===
Running order

Order	Couple	Dance	Music	González	Mabuse	Llambi	Score	Result
1	Thomas & Regina	Cha-cha-cha	"Traum"—Cro	5	5	6	16	Safe
2	Minh-Khai & Massimo	Quickstep	"Jungle Drum"—Emilíana Torrini	6	5	5	16	Safe
3	Detlef & Isabel	Cha-cha-cha	"Rasputin"—Boney M.	3	3	1	7	Bottom 3
4	Katja & Paul	Waltz	"There Must Be an Angel (Playing with My Heart)"—Eurythmics	7	6	4	17	Safe
5	Cathy & Marius	Cha-cha-cha	"I Love It"—Icona Pop	3	4	2	9	Eliminated
6	Matthias & Ekaterina	Waltz	"Can't Help Falling in Love"—Elvis	6	5	2	13	Safe
7	Ralf & Oana	Quickstep	"Good Days"—Sascha Schmitz	5	5	4	14	Safe
8	Beatrice & Vadim	Cha-cha-cha	"Don't Go Breaking My Heart"—Elton John	5	5	3	13	Safe
9	Panagiota & Sergiu	Quickstep	"Valerie"—Amy Winehouse	5	6	4	15	Safe
10	Hans & Kathrin	Cha-cha-cha	"Auf uns"—Andreas Bourani	7	7	7	21	Safe
11	Miloš & Cathrin	Waltz	"You're Beautiful"—James Blunt	8	7	6	21	Safe
12	Daniel & Otlile	Quickstep	"You're The One That I Want"—John Travolta & Olivia Newton-John	6	6	3	15	Safe
13	Enissa & Christian	Cha-cha-cha	"All About That Bass"—Meghan Trainor	8	8	5	21	Safe
14	Cora & Erich	Waltz	"Beneath Your Beautiful"—Labrinth feat. Emeli Sandé	3	4	2	9	Bottom 2

=== Week 2 ===
Running order

Order	Couple	Dance	Music	González	Mabuse	Llambi	Score	Result
1	Matthias & Ekaterina	Jive	"Crazy Little Thing Called Love"—Queen	7	6	4	17	Safe
2	Panagiota & Sergiu	Rumba	"Titanium"—David Guetta feat. Sia	3	3	2	8	Bottom 3
3	Miloš & Cathrin	Jive	"Einmal um die Welt"—Cro	5	5	6	16	Safe
4	Ralf & Oana	Rumba	"Against All Odds"—Westlife	8	7	7	22	Safe
5	Beatrice & Vadim	Foxtrot	"Stumblin' In"—Chris Norman & Suzi Quatro	7	6	4	17	Safe
6	Thomas & Regina	Foxtrot	"My Girl"—The Temptations	5	5	3	13	Bottom 2
7	Cora & Erich	Jive	"Shake It Off"—Taylor Swift	3	3	1	7	Eliminated
8	Detlef & Isabel	Rumba	"(Everything I Do) I Do It For You"—Bryan Adams	4	4	2	10	Safe
9	Minh-Khai & Massimo	Rumba	"If I Were A Boy"—Beyoncé	9	8	8	25	Safe
10	Katja & Paul	Jive	"Shake A Tail Feather"—Ray Charles	6	5	4	15	Safe
11	Hans & Kathrin	Foxtrot	"L.O.V.E."—Nat King Cole	9	8	6	23	Safe
12	Daniel & Otlile	Rumba	"Mad World"—Gary Jules	6	6	4	16	Safe
13	Enissa & Christian	Foxtrot	"Back to Black"—Amy Winehouse	9	8	6	23	Safe

=== Week 3: 80's Night ===
- The couples performed to a song from the 1980s

Running order

Order	Couple	Dance	Music	González	Mabuse	Llambi	Score	Result
1	Thomas & Regina	Paso doble	"Wild Boys"—Duran Duran	7	7	5	19	Safe
2	Panagiota & Sergiu	Cha-cha-cha	"It's Raining Men"—The Weather Girls	4	4	2	10	Eliminated
3	Daniel & Otlile	Contemporary	"Jeanny"—Falco	6	8	6	20	Safe
4	Katja & Paul	Rumba	"True"—Spandau Ballet	5	4	2	11	Bottom 3
5	Detlef & Isabel	Quickstep	"Live Is Life"—Opus	5	5	3	13	Safe
6	Beatrice & Vadim	Contemporary	"Forever Young"—Alphaville	6	5	2	13	Bottom 2
7	Matthias & Ekaterina	Rumba	"Ohne Dich"—Münchener Freiheit	8	7	6	21	Safe
8	Miloš & Cathrin	Paso doble	"Fade to Grey"—Visage	5	5	2	12	Safe
9	Enissa & Christian	Tango	"West End Girls"—Pet Shop Boys	8	7	4	19	Safe
10	Ralf & Oana	Foxtrot	"Words"—F. R. David	6	6	2	14	Safe
11	Hans & Kathrin	Tango	"Personal Jesus"—Depeche Mode	9	9	8	26	Safe
12	Minh-Khai & Massimo	Contemporary	"Nothing Compares 2 U"—Sinéad O'Connor	10	10	10	30	Safe

=== Week 4 ===
Running order

Order	Couple	Dance	Music	González	Mabuse	Llambi	Score	Result
1	Katja & Paul	Quickstep	"Mister Sandman"—The Chordettes	4	4	2	10	Bottom 3
2	Thomas & Regina	Rumba	"Stay with Me"—Sam Smith	8	8	7	23	Safe
3	Miloš & Cathrin	Salsa	"Smooth"—Santana feat. Robin Thomas	4	4	1	9	Eliminated
4	Minh-Khai & Massimo	Hip-Hop	"Scream & Shout"—will.i.am feat. Britney Spears	9	8	8	25	Safe
5	Daniel & Otlile	Cha-cha-cha	"Tragedy"—Bee Gees	5	5	2	12	Safe
6	Ralf & Oana	Argentine tango	"El Choclo"—Ángel Villoldo	10	9	8	27	Safe
7	Enissa & Christian	Salsa	"Let's Get Loud"—Jennifer Lopez	10	10	7	27	Safe
8	Beatrice & Vadim	Quickstep	"The Lady Is a Tramp"—Frank Sinatra	6	6	4	16	Safe
9	Matthias & Ekaterina	Paso doble	"Supermassive Black Hole"—Muse	6	6	3	15	Safe
10	Detlef & Isabel	Salsa	"Papa Loves Mambo"—Perry Como	4	4	3	11	Bottom 2
11	Hans & Kathrin	Hip-Hop	"Black or White"—Michael Jackson	10	9	7	26	Safe

=== Week 5: Musical Night ===
- The couples performed to a song from a musical.

Running order

Order	Couple	Dance	Music	González	Mabuse	Llambi	Score	Result
1	Ralf & Oana	Salsa	"La Bamba"—from La Bamba	8	7	6	21	Safe
2	Beatrice & Vadim	Waltz	"Memory"—from Cats	7	7	4	18	Bottom 3
3	Thomas & Regina	Jive	"Don't Stop Me Now"—from We Will Rock You	9	10	9	28	Safe
4	Daniel & Otlile	Waltz	"Yesterday"—from All You Need Is Love	6	6	2	14	Bottom 2
5	Detlef & Isabel	Paso doble	"Eye of the Tiger"—from Rocky the Musical	4	4	3	11	Eliminated
6	Katja & Paul	Cha-cha-cha	"Mamma Mia"—from Mamma Mia!	3	3	1	7	Safe
7	Matthias & Ekaterina	Foxtrot	"Ich war noch niemals in New York"—from Ich war noch niemals in New York	8	7	5	20	Safe
8	Minh-Khai & Massimo	Salsa	"America"—from West Side Story	8	8	7	23	Safe
9	Hans & Kathrin	Rumba	"A Whole New World"—from Aladdin	9	9	6	24	Safe
10	Enissa & Christian	Jive	"I Will Follow Him"—from Sister Act	8	9	6	23	Safe

=== Week 6 ===
Running order

Order	Couple	Dance	Music	González	Mabuse	Llambi	Score	Result
1	Matthias & Ekaterina	Salsa	"Get Lucky"—Daft Punk feat. Pharrell Williams	5	5	3	13	Bottom 3
2	Beatrice & Vadim	Paso doble	"Explosive"—Bond	5	4	3	12	Eliminated
3	Hans & Kathrin	Samba	"Talk Dirty"—Jason Derulo	5	5	3	13	Safe
4	Katja & Paul	Tango	"A Night Like This"—Caro Emerald	7	5	4	16	Safe
5	Ralf & Oana	Paso doble	"Love Runs Out"—OneRepublic	7	7	5	19	Bottom 2
6	Daniel & Otlile	Hip-Hop	"Sing"—Ed Sheeran	7	7	5	19	Safe
7	Minh-Khai & Massimo	Tango	"Cell Block Tango"—from Chicago	10	9	9	28	Safe
8	Enissa & Christian	Rumba	"Time After Time"—Eva Cassidy	8	7	4	19	Safe
9	Thomas & Regina	Samba	"It's Not Unusual"—Tom Jones	5	5	1	11	Safe

=== Week 7: Idols Night ===
- The couples performed to a song from her idol.

Running order

Order	Couple	Dance	Music	Idol	González	Mabuse	Llambi	Score	Result
1	Ralf & Oana	Jive	"I Won't Dance"	Frank Sinatra	7	6	5	18	Bottom 3
1	Ralf & Oana	Charleston	"I Won't Dance"	Frank Sinatra	7	6	5	18	Bottom 3
2	Katja & Paul	Tango	"Strong Enough"	Cher	3	3	2	8	Eliminated
2	Katja & Paul	Quickstep	"Strong Enough"	Cher	3	3	2	8	Eliminated
3	Matthias & Ekaterina	Jive	"Jailhouse Rock"	Elvis	9	9	7	25	Safe
3	Matthias & Ekaterina	Foxtrot	"Jailhouse Rock"	Elvis	9	9	7	25	Safe
4	Daniel & Otlile	Jazz	"Born This Way"	Lady Gaga	8	7	4	19	Bottom 2
4	Daniel & Otlile	Paso doble	"Born This Way"	Lady Gaga	8	7	4	19	Bottom 2
5	Enissa & Christian	Rumba	"Happy Birthday, Mr. President"	Marilyn Monroe	7	7	5	19	Safe
5	Enissa & Christian	Jive	"I Wanna Be Loved By You"	Marilyn Monroe	7	7	5	19	Safe
6	Thomas & Regina	Argentine tango	"Goldfinger"	James Bond	9	9	7	25	Safe
6	Thomas & Regina	Rumba	"GoldenEye"	James Bond	9	9	7	25	Safe
7	Hans & Kathrin	Contemporary	"I Believe I Can Fly"	R. Kelly	10	10	8	28	Safe
7	Hans & Kathrin	Jazz	"I Believe I Can Fly"	R. Kelly	10	10	8	28	Safe
8	Minh-Khai & Massimo	Paso doble	"Billie Jean"	Michael Jackson	10	10	9	29	Safe
8	Minh-Khai & Massimo	Rumba	"Billie Jean"	Michael Jackson	10	10	9	29	Safe

=== Week 8 ===
- On May 4, 2015, Ralf Bauer had to withdraw from the competition because of health issues. Katja Burkard returned to the competition.

Running order

Order	Couple	Dance	Music	González	Mabuse	Llambi	Score	Result
1	Daniel & Otlile	Samba	"Livin' La Vida Loca"一Ricky Martin	7	7	5	19	Safe
2	Matthias & Ekaterina	Quickstep	"I Wan'na Be Like You"—from The Jungle Book	10	9	8	27	Safe
3	Hans & Kathrin	Jive	"Oh Johnny"一Jan Delay	7	8	6	21	Safe
4	Enissa & Christian	Paso doble	"Zorongo"一Paco Peña	10	10	9	29	Safe
5	Thomas & Regina	Tango	"Kein Schwein ruft mich an"一Max Raabe	6	5	4	15	Bottom 2
6	Minh-Khai & Massimo	Foxtrot	"Stay"一Rihanna feat. Mikky Ekko	7	7	6	20	Bottom 3
7	Katja & Paul	Hip-Hop	"Girl You Know It's True"一Milli Vanilli	3	3	1	7	Eliminated
	Matthias & Ekaterina; Minh-Khai & Massimo; Hans & Kathrin; Enissa & Christian; Katja & Paul; Thomas & Regina; Daniel & Otlile	Disco Marathon	"Fliegerlied"一Tim Toupet "Traum von Amsterdam"一Axel Fischer "Verlieben, verloren, vergessen, verzeih'n"一Wolfgang Petry "Mein Herz"一Beatrice Egli "Du hast mich tausendmal belogen"一Andrea Berg "Das geht ab!"一Frauenarzt "Ich will immer wieder... dieses Fieber spür'n"一Helene Fischer	1; 2; 3; 4; 6; 8; 10				

=== Week 9: Dance Duels Night ===
- For the first time a "Dance Duel" was introduced to the show. Two couples had to perform at the same time a dance style with the same choreography. The Rock n' Roll was also introduced as a new dance style.

Running order

Order	Couple	Dance	Music	González	Mabuse	Llambi	Score	Result
1	Matthias & Ekaterina	Hip-Hop	"Stayin' Alive"一N-Trance	7	6	4	17	Safe
2	Daniel & Otlile	Tango	"When Doves Cry"一Prince	6	6	2	14	Eliminated
3	Minh-Khai & Massimo	Cha-cha-cha	"Wrapped Up"一Olly Murs	6	6	4	16	Bottom 2
4	Hans & Kathrin	Paso doble	"Run Boy Run"一Woodkid	9	9	7	25	Safe
5	Thomas & Regina	Contemporary	"Auf anderen Wegen"一Andreas Bourani	9	9	7	25	Safe
6	Enissa & Christian	Waltz	"People Help the People"一Birdy	9	9	6	24	Safe
	Matthias & Ekaterina; Hans & Kathrin	Charleston	"Bang Bang"一Will.i.am	7	7	6	20	
	Matthias & Ekaterina; Hans & Kathrin	Charleston	"Bang Bang"一Will.i.am	8	9	6	23	
	Daniel & Otlile; Thomas & Regina	Rock n' Roll	"Surfin' U.S.A."一The Beach Boys	6	7	4	17	
	Daniel & Otlile; Thomas & Regina	Rock n' Roll	"Surfin' U.S.A."一The Beach Boys	6	7	5	18	
	Minh-Khai & Massimo; Enissa & Christian	Bollywood	"Pretty Woman"一Kal Ho Naa Ho	9	8	8	25	
	Minh-Khai & Massimo; Enissa & Christian	Bollywood	"Pretty Woman"一Kal Ho Naa Ho	9	10	8	27	

=== Week 10 ===
Running order

Order	Couple	Dance	Music	González	Mabuse	Llambi	Score	Result
1	Hans & Kathrin	Quickstep	"All Night"一Parov Stelar	9	9	6	24	Bottom 2
1	Hans & Kathrin	Contemporary	"Earned It"—from Fifty Shades of Grey	10	9	9	28	Bottom 2
2	Thomas & Regina	Hip-Hop	"Die Da!?!"一Die Fantastischen Vier	7	6	4	17	Eliminated
2	Thomas & Regina	Quickstep	"Girls! Girls! Girls!"—from Girls! Girls! Girls!	6	6	2	14	Eliminated
3	Matthias & Ekaterina	Cha-cha-cha	"Kiss"一Prince	6	5	3	14	Safe
3	Matthias & Ekaterina	Samba	"La Camisa Negra"一Juanes	6	6	2	14	Safe
4	Minh-Khai & Massimo	Waltz	"Jar of Hearts"一Christina Perri	9	9	9	27	Safe
4	Minh-Khai & Massimo	Jive	"Hit the Road Jack"一Ray Charles	9	8	8	25	Safe
5	Enissa & Christian	Samba	"We Are One (Ole Ola)"一Pitbull feat. Jennifer Lopez & Claudia Leitte	10	10	9	29	Safe
5	Enissa & Christian	Contemporary	"Chandelier"一Sia	10	10	9	29	Safe

=== Week 11: Semi-Final ===
- For the first time every semi-finalist had to learn three individual dances while the third dance was an "impro dance" which means that the celebrities got the music only 20 minutes before they had to perform. They did not know the dance style and their costumes too.

Running order

Order	Couple	Dance	Music	González	Mabuse	Llambi	Score	Result
1	Enissa & Christian	Quickstep	"Crazy in Love"—Emeli Sandé and The Bryan Ferry Orchestra	8	8	5	21	Eliminated
1	Enissa & Christian	Hip-Hop	"Don't Cha"—The Pussycat Dolls	9	9	4	22	Eliminated
1	Enissa & Christian	Cha-cha-cha	"Call Me Maybe"—Carly Rae Jepsen	8	8	6	22	Eliminated
2	Hans & Kathrin	Salsa	"Dr. Beat"—Miami Sound Machine	9	9	8	26	Safe
2	Hans & Kathrin	Waltz	"I Belong to You"—Eros Ramazzotti	10	10	9	29	Safe
2	Hans & Kathrin	Cha-cha-cha	"Ain't No Mountain High Enough"—Marvin Gaye	10	9	9	28	Safe
3	Matthias & Ekaterina	Tango	"Grenade"—Bruno Mars	8	9	7	24	Safe
3	Matthias & Ekaterina	Contemporary	"One"—U2	10	10	8	28	Safe
3	Matthias & Ekaterina	Rumba	"You'll Be in My Heart"—Phil Collins	9	9	8	26	Safe
4	Minh-Khai & Massimo	Samba	"Boum Boum Boum"—MIKA	9	8	8	25	Bottom 2
4	Minh-Khai & Massimo	Paso doble	"Carmen Suites (Bizet/Guiraud)"—Georges Bizet	9	9	8	26	Bottom 2
4	Minh-Khai & Massimo	Rumba	"Dear Darlin'"—Olly Murs	10	9	9	28	Bottom 2

=== Week 12: Finale ===
Running order

Order	Couple	Dance	Music	González	Mabuse	Llambi	Score	Result
1	Matthias & Ekaterina	Salsa	"Jump in the Line (Shake, Senora)"—Harry Belafonte	8	8	7	23	Third place
1	Matthias & Ekaterina	Quickstep	"I Wan'na Be Like You"—from The Jungle Book	10	10	9	29	Third place
1	Matthias & Ekaterina	Freestyle	Medley of Andreas Gabalier	9	8	7	24	Third place
2	Minh-Khai & Massimo	Quickstep	"Rehab"—Amy Winehouse	9	8	8	25	Runner-Up
2	Minh-Khai & Massimo	Contemporary	"Nothing Compares 2 U"—Sinéad O'Connor	10	10	10	30	Runner-Up
2	Minh-Khai & Massimo	Freestyle	Medley of Gladiator	10	10	10	30	Runner-Up
3	Hans & Kathrin	Samba	"All Night Long (All Night)"—Lionel Richie	8	8	8	24	Winner
3	Hans & Kathrin	Hip-Hop	"Black or White"—Michael Jackson	10	10	9	29	Winner
3	Hans & Kathrin	Freestyle	Africa Medley	10	10	9	29	Winner

Encore performances by the eliminated couples

Order	Couple	Dance	Music
1	Cathy & Marius	Cha-cha-cha	"I Love It"—Icona Pop
2	Cora & Erich	Waltz	"Beneath Your Beautiful"—Labrinth feat. Emeli Sandé
3	Panagiota & Sergiu	Quickstep	"Valerie"—Amy Winehouse
4	Miloš & Cathrin	Waltz	"You're Beautiful"—James Blunt
5	Detlef & Isabel	Salsa	"Papa Loves Mambo"—Perry Como
6	Beatrice & Vadim	Quickstep	"The Lady Is a Tramp"—Frank Sinatra
7	Ralf & Oana	Argentine tango	"El Choclo"—Ángel Villoldo
8	Katja & Paul	Cha-cha-cha	"Mamma Mia"—from Mamma Mia!
9	Daniel & Otlile	Hip-Hop	"Sing"—Ed Sheeran
10	Thomas & Regina	Jive	"Don't Stop Me Now"—from We Will Rock You
11	Enissa & Christian	Paso doble	"Zorongo"一Paco Peña

== Dance chart ==
Highest scoring dance
Lowest scoring dance
Did not scored (encore performance in the finale)
Withdrew from the competition

Couple	1	2	3	4	5	6	7	8		9		10		11			12		
Hans & Kathrin	Cha-cha-cha	Foxtrot	Tango	Hip-Hop	Rumba	Samba	Contemporary; Jazz	Jive	Disco Marathon	Paso doble	Charleston	Quickstep	Contemporary	Salsa	Waltz	Cha-cha-cha	Samba	Hip-Hop	Freestyle
Minh-Khai & Massimo	Quickstep	Rumba	Contemporary	Hip-Hop	Salsa	Tango	Paso doble Rumba	Foxtrot	Disco Marathon	Cha-cha-cha	Bollywood	Waltz	Jive	Samba	Paso doble	Rumba	Quickstep	Contemporary	Freestyle
Matthias & Ekaterina	Waltz	Jive	Rumba	Paso doble	Foxtrot	Salsa	Jive; Foxtrot	Quickstep	Disco Marathon	Hip-Hop	Charleston	Cha-cha-cha	Samba	Tango	Contemporary	Rumba	Salsa	Quickstep	Freestyle
Enissa & Christian	Cha-cha-cha	Foxtrot	Tango	Salsa	Jive	Rumba	Rumba; Jive	Paso doble	Disco Marathon	Waltz	Bollywood	Samba	Contemporary	Quickstep	Hip-Hop	Cha-cha-cha			Paso doble
Thomas & Regina	Cha-cha-cha	Foxtrot	Paso doble	Rumba	Jive	Samba	Argentine tango Rumba	Tango	Disco Marathon	Contemporary	Rock n' Roll	Hip-Hop	Quickstep						Jive
Daniel & Otlile	Quickstep	Rumba	Contemporary	Cha-cha-cha	Waltz	Hip-Hop	Jazz; Paso doble	Samba	Disco Marathon	Tango	Rock n' Roll								Hip-Hop
Katja & Paul	Waltz	Jive	Rumba	Quickstep	Cha-cha-cha	Tango	Tango; Quickstep	Hip-Hop	Disco Marathon										Cha-cha-cha
Ralf & Oana	Quickstep	Rumba	Foxtrot	Argentine tango	Salsa	Paso doble	Jive; Charleston												Argentine tango
Beatrice & Vadim	Cha-cha-cha	Foxtrot	Contemporary	Quickstep	Waltz	Paso doble													Quickstep
Detlef & Isabel	Cha-cha-cha	Foxtrot	Quickstep	Salsa	Paso doble														Salsa
Miloš & Cathrin	Waltz	Jive	Paso doble	Salsa															Waltz
Panagiota & Sergiu	Quickstep	Rumba	Cha-cha-cha																Quickstep
Cora & Erich	Waltz	Jive																	Waltz
Cathy & Marius	Cha-cha-cha																		Cha-cha-cha
