= Yuven Sundaramoorthy =

American racing driver (born 2003)

- Nationality: (United States) American
- Born: February 22, 2003 (age 23); Oconomowoc, Wisconsin, United States

Indy NXT career
- Debut season: 2023
- Current team: Cusick Morgan Motorsports
- Car number: 15
- Former teams: Abel Motorsports
- Starts: 18
- Championships: 0
- Wins: 0
- Podiums: 1
- Poles: 0
- Fastest laps: 0
- Best finish: 8th in 2024

Previous series
- 2018–21 2019–20 2018 2017–18: U.S. F2000 National Championship; MRF Challenge; Formula Ford; F1600 Championship Series

Yuven Sundaramoorthy (born February 22, 2003) is an American racing driver who is currently competing in Indy NXT for Cusick Morgan Motorsports. He previously drove for Exclusive Motorsport and Pabst Racing and competed in the US F2000 National Championship, Indian based MRF Challenge, Formula F and F1600 Championship Series.

== Racing career ==
=== USF Pro 2000 ===
On December 10, 2021, it was announced that Sundaramoorthy would move up to the Indy Pro 2000 Championship with Pabst Racing to compete in the 2022 season. He would have three podiums and end up finishing tenth in the standings.

In late September 2022, Sundaramoorthy announced that he would switch teams from Pabst Racing to drive for Exclusive Autosport for the 2023 season.

=== Indy NXT ===
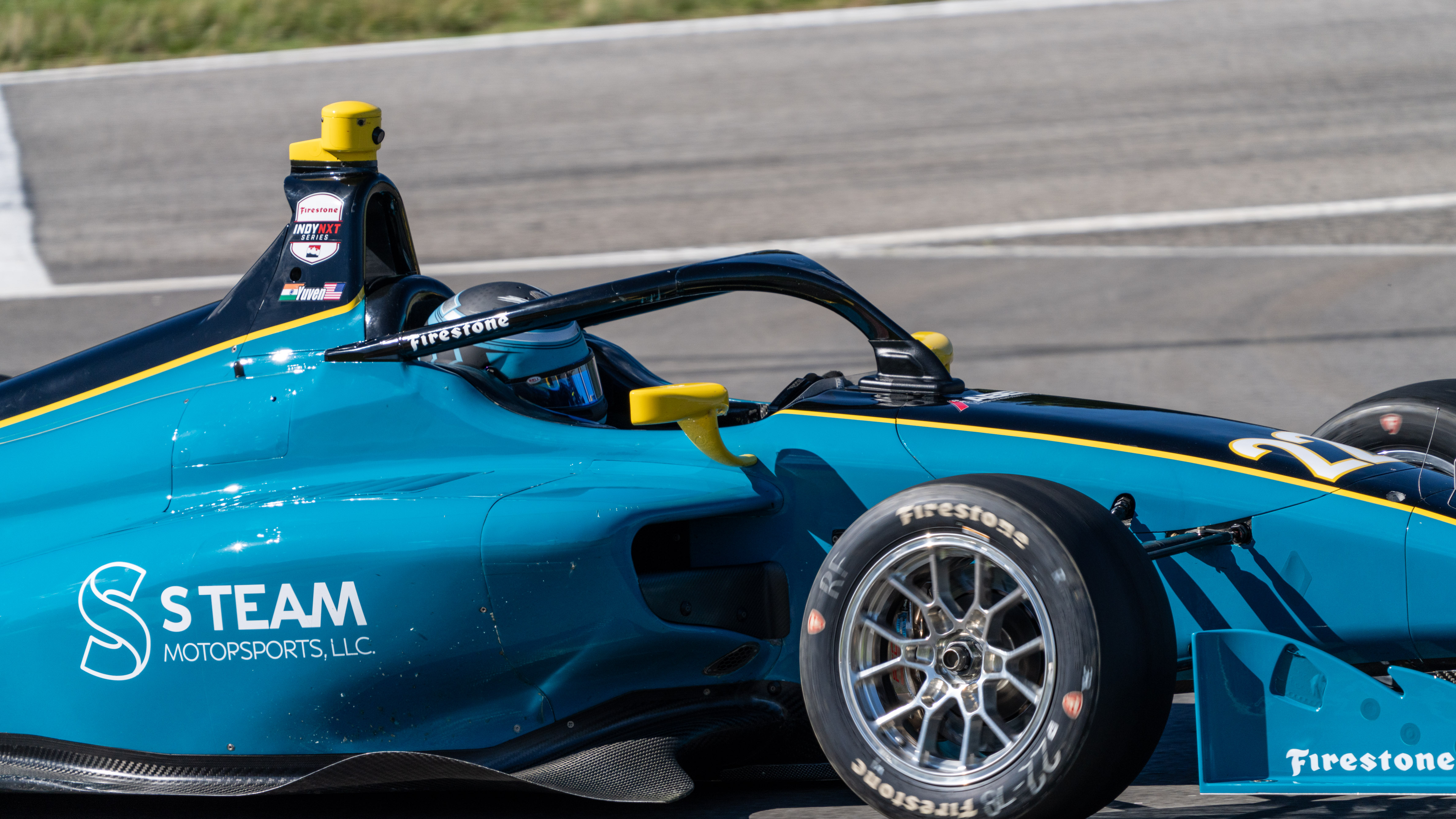
Sundaramoorthy in his No. 22 Abel Motorsports Indy NXT car at Mid-Ohio in 2024

On July 26, 2023, it was announced that Sundaramoorthy would drive in select rounds of the 2023 Indy NXT with Abel Motorsports in the No. 57 car. For 2024, Sundaramoorthy continued with Abel Motorsports, this time as the full-time driver of the No. 22 car.

Having originally been slated to contest a second season in Indy NXT with Abel, Sundaramoorthy withdrew due to "unforeseen budget challenges". At the start of 2025, he became a test engineer for Tesla, Inc.

== Racing record ==
=== Career summary ===
Season	Series	Team	Races	Wins	Poles	F/Laps	Podiums	Points	Position
2017	F1600 Championship Series	K-Hill Motorsports	18	2	1	2	6	642	4th
2018	F1600 Championship Series	K-Hill Motorsports	20	2	2	1	9	709	**3rd**
2018	Formula Ford	K-Hill Motorsports	8	1	5	N/A	N/A	123	**2nd**
2018	U.S. F2000 National Championship	Exclusive Autosport	3	0	0	0	0	29	28th
2019	U.S. F2000 National Championship	Pabst Racing	15	0	0	0	0	150	12th
2019–20	MRF Challenge Formula 2000 Championship	MRF Racing	15	2	1	2	4	138	6th
2020	U.S. F2000 National Championship	Pabst Racing	16	0	0	0	0	165	12th
2021	U.S. F2000 National Championship	Pabst Racing	18	4	4	5	9	329	**3rd**
2022	Indy Pro 2000 Championship	Pabst Racing	18	0	0	0	3	244	10th
2023	USF Pro 2000 Championship	Exclusive Autosport	13	0	0	0	0	121	15th
2023	Indy NXT	Abel Motorsports	4	0	0	0	0	77	22nd
2024	Indy NXT	Abel Motorsports	14	0	0	0	2	309	8th
2026	Indy NXT	Cusick Morgan Motorsports	1	0	0	0	0	9	28th

* Season still in progress.

=== Complete MRF Challenge Formula 2000 Championship results ===
(key) (Races in bold indicate pole position; races in italics indicate fastest lap)

Year	Team	1	2	3	4	5	6	7	8	9	10	11	12	13	14	15	DC	Points
2019–20	MRF Racing	DUB; 1; 7	DUB; 2 Ret	DUB; 3; 5	DUB; 4; 1	DUB; 5; 6	BHR; 1 Ret	BHR; 2; 9	BHR; 3; 3	BHR; 4; 8	CHE; 1; 10	CHE; 2; 7	CHE; 3; 6	CHE; 4; 1	**CHE**; **5**; 2	CHE; 6; 7	6th	138

=== American open-wheel racing results ===
==== U.S. F2000 National Championship ====
(key) (Races in bold indicate pole position) (Races in italics indicate fastest lap) (Races with * indicate most race laps led)

Year	Team	1	2	3	4	5	6	7	8	9	10	11	12	13	14	15	16	17	18	Rank	Points
2018	Exclusive Autosport	STP; 1	STP; 2	IMS; 1	IMS; 2	LOR	ROA; 1	ROA; 2	TOR; 1	TOR; 2	MOH; 1; 14	MOH; 2; 10	MOH; 3; 10	POR; 1	POR; 2					29th	29
2019	Pabst Racing	STP; 1; 8	STP; 2; 11	IMS; 1; 12	IMS; 2; 13	LOR; 12	ROA; 1; 7	ROA; 2; 12	TOR; 1; 14	TOR; 2; 8	MOH; 1; 6	MOH; 2; 14	POR; 1; 15	POR; 2; 14	POR; 1; 15	POR; 2; 9				12th	150
2020	Pabst Racing	ROA; 1; 9	ROA; 2; 8	MOH; 1; 20	MOH; 2; 6	MOH; 3; 9	LOR; 9	IMS; 1; 8	IMS; 2; 9	IMS; 3; 14	MOH; 4; 9	MOH; 5; 14	MOH; 6; 16	NJMP; 1; 10	NJMP; 2; 5	NJMP; 3; 12	STP; 1; 21	STP; 2 DNS		12th	165
2021	Pabst Racing	**ALA**; **1**; 1*	ALA; 2; 10	STP; 1; 3	STP; 2; 24	IMS; 1; 1	**IMS**; **2**; 1*	**IMS**; **3**; 3	LOR; 6	ROA; 1; 8	ROA; 2; 6	MOH; 1; 10	MOH; 2; 14	MOH; 3; 3	**NJMP**; **1**; 2	NJMP; 2; 20	NJMP; 3; 3	MOH; 1; 1*	MOH; 2; 19	3rd	329

==== USF Pro 2000 Championship ====
(key) (Races in bold indicate pole position) (Races in italics indicate fastest lap) (Races with * indicate most race laps led)

Year	Team	1	2	3	4	5	6	7	8	9	10	11	12	13	14	15	16	17	18	Rank	Points
2022	Pabst Racing	STP; 1; 11	STP; 2; 7	ALA; 1; 12	ALA; 2; 11	IMS; 1; 2	IMS; 2; 8	IMS; 3; 12	IRP; 12	ROA; 1; 10	ROA; 2; 8	MOH; 1; 13	MOH; 2; 3	TOR; 1; 6	TOR; 2; 3	GMP; 9	POR; 1; 11	POR; 2; 11	POR; 3; 10	10th	244
2023	Exclusive Autosport	STP; 1; 8	STP; 2; 20	SEB; 1; 9	SEB; 2; 14	IMS; 1; 15	IMS; 2; 12	IRP; 9	ROA; 1; 10	ROA; 2; 13	MOH; 1; 13	MOH; 2; 13	TOR; 1; 14	TOR; 2; 8	COTA; 1	COTA; 1	POR; 1	POR; 2	POR; 3	15th	121

==== Indy NXT ====
(key) (Races in bold indicate pole position) (Races in italics indicate fastest lap) (Races with ^{L} indicate a race lap led) (Races with * indicate most race laps led)

Year	Team	1	2	3	4	5	6	7	8	9	10	11	12	13	14	15	16	17	Rank	Points
2023	Abel Motorsports	STP	BAR	IMS	DET	DET	RDA	MOH	IOW	NSH; 11	IMS	GMP	POR; 10	LAG; 13	LAG; 9				22nd	77
2024	Abel Motorsports	STP; 12	BAR; 21	IMS; 20	IMS; 21	DET; 14	RDA; 9	LAG; 4	LAG; 4	MOH; 14	IOW; 10	GMP; 3	POR; 8	MIL; 7	NSH; 2				8th	309
2026	Cusick Morgan Motorsports	STP	ARL	BAR	BAR	IMS	IMS	DET	GAT; 21	ROA	ROA	MOH	MOH	NSS	POR	MIL	LAG	LAG	28th	9
