= Gina-Maria Bethke =

German equestrian and competitive reining rider (born 1997)

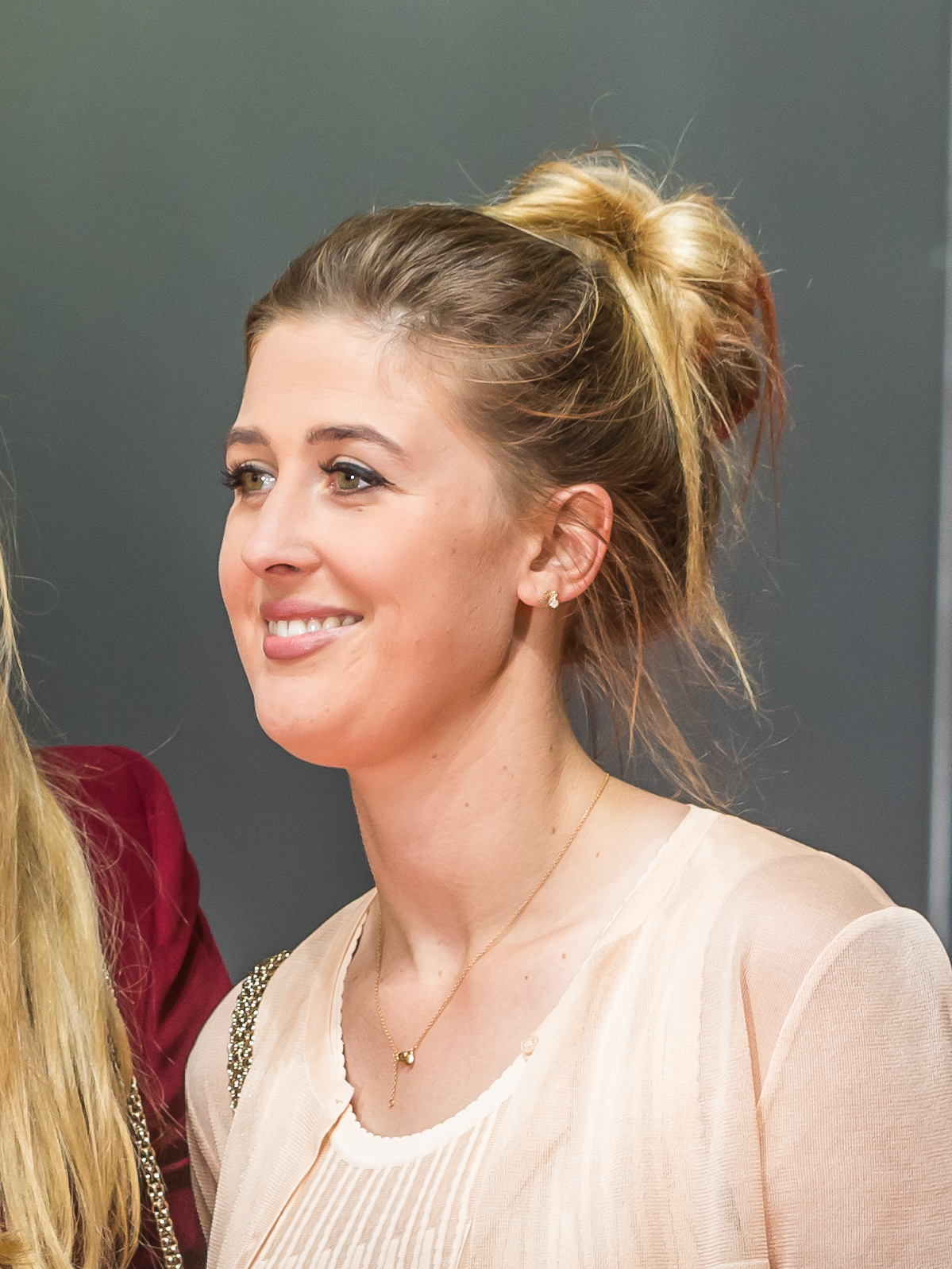
- Bethke in 2022
- Born: February 20, 1997 (age 29); Wipperfürth, Germany
- Other name: Gina-Maria Schumacher
- Occupation: Equestrian
- Years active: 2010–present
- Spouse: Iain Bethke (m. 2023)
- Children: 1
- Parent(s): Michael Schumacher; Corinna Schumacher
- Relatives: Mick Schumacher (brother); Ralf Schumacher (uncle); David Schumacher (cousin)

Gina-Maria Bethke (née Schumacher; born 20 February 1997) is a German equestrian and competitive reining rider. Bethke is the daughter of seven-time Formula One World Champion Michael Schumacher and equestrian Corinna Schumacher.

== Early life ==
From the age of three, Gina was immersed in equestrian activities; starting with Shetland ponies, and by the time she was nine she was competing. She had also tried karting in her youth but preferred equestrianism, saying she "preferred horses".

== Equestrian career ==
Schumacher has competed in national and international reining competitions.

In August 2017 she participated in the FEI World Reining Championships, in which she won a gold medal. The next year in February 2018 she claimed another gold at the National Reining Horse Association's novice event Cavalli, which was held in Switzerland. In the same year she competed in the World Championships for Junior Riders, in which she also won.

In 2025 she won the 2025 NRHA World Championship held in Givrins, Switzerland.

== Personal life ==
Schumacher married Iain Bethke in 2023 in an ultra-private ceremony at the Schumacher family home – Villa Yasmin – in Puerto De Andratx, Mallorca. The couple have a daughter born on March 29, 2025.

Her family owns a ranch business — CS Ranch (Switzerland) and XCS Ranch (Texas, USA) — involved in breeding, training and showing horses. She has also worked as a model and figurehead for a fashion label called Herzen's Angelegenheit, working with fashion designers for her Bremen-based family business on silk blouses and scarves featuring horse patterns.
