= 2025 4 Hours of Le Castellet =

Endurance sportscar racing event

The layout of Circuit Paul Ricard

The 2025 4 Hours of Le Castellet was an endurance sportscar racing event, held between 2 and 4 May 2025 at Circuit Paul Ricard in Le Castellet, France. It was the second of six rounds of the 2025 European Le Mans Series season, and the fourteenth consecutive running of the event as part of the championship.

== Entry list ==
The provisional entry list was published on 24 April 2025 and consisted of 44 entries across 4 categories – 13 in LMP2, 8 in LMP2 Pro-Am, 10 in LMP3, and 13 in LMGT3. In the LMP2 Pro-Am class, Nicklas Nielsen replaced Alessio Rovera in the No. 83 AF Corse Oreca. Louis Stern replaced Louis Rossi in the No. 35 Ultimate Ligier in the LMP3 class. Furthermore, Sebastian Gravlund did not drive in the No. 11 EuroInternational Ligier; driving duties will be shared between Ian Aguilera and Fabien Michal. Finally, James Calado replaced Daniel Serra in the No. 57 Kessel Racing Ferrari in the LMGT3 class.

After suffering back pain in testing on Friday, Claudio Schiavoni opted to sit out the event. Christian Ried replaced him in the No. 60 Proton Competition Porsche.

== Schedule ==
Date	Time (local: CEST)	Event
Friday, 2 May	11:00	Free Practice 1
Friday, 2 May	15:00	Bronze Driver Collective Test
Saturday, 3 May	10:10	Free Practice 2
Saturday, 3 May	14:20	Qualifying – LMGT3
Saturday, 3 May	14:45	Qualifying – LMP3
Saturday, 3 May	15:10	Qualifying – LMP2 Pro-Am
Saturday, 3 May	15:35	Qualifying – LMP2
Sunday, 4 May	12:00	Race

== Free practice ==
Two practice sessions were held before the event: one on Friday and one on Saturday. Both sessions ran for 90 minutes.

=== Practice 1 ===
The first practice session started at 11:00 CEST on Friday. Matteo Cairoli topped the session in the No. 9 Iron Lynx – Proton Oreca, with a lap time of 1:49.096. He was 0.887 seconds quicker than second-placed Pietro Fittipaldi in the No. 10 Vector Sport Oreca. Laurents Hörr topped the LMP2 Pro-Am class in the No. 3 DKR Engineering Oreca, lapping the circuit in 1 minute, 50.437 seconds. Olli Caldwell was second-fastest, 0.652 seconds behind Hörr in the No. 20 Algarve Pro Racing Oreca. Adrien Closmenil topped the charts in LMP3: his No. 17 CLX Motorsport Ligier lapped the circuit in 1:58.701, 0.116 seconds quicker than the No. 8 Team Virage Ligier of Rik Koen. LMGT3 was topped by the No. 51 AF Corse Ferrari, with Davide Rigon lapping the circuit in 2 minutes, 3.716 seconds. Rigon's team mate Riccardo Agostini was second-fastest in the No. 50 Ferrari, 0.028 seconds behind. The No. 86 GR Racing Ferrari of Riccardo Pera finished the session in third. The session saw one red-flag stoppage after Kriton Lendoudis beached his car on the kerb.

Class	No.	Entrant	Driver	Time
LMP2	9	(Germany) Iron Lynx – Proton	(Italy) Matteo Cairoli	1:49.096
LMP2 Pro-Am	3	(Luxembourg) DKR Engineering	(Germany) Laurents Hörr	1:50.437
LMP3	17	(Switzerland) CLX Motorsport	(France) Adrien Closmenil	1:58.701
LMGT3	51	(Italy) AF Corse	(Italy) Davide Rigon	2:03.716

- Note: Only the fastest car in each class is shown.

=== Practice 2 ===
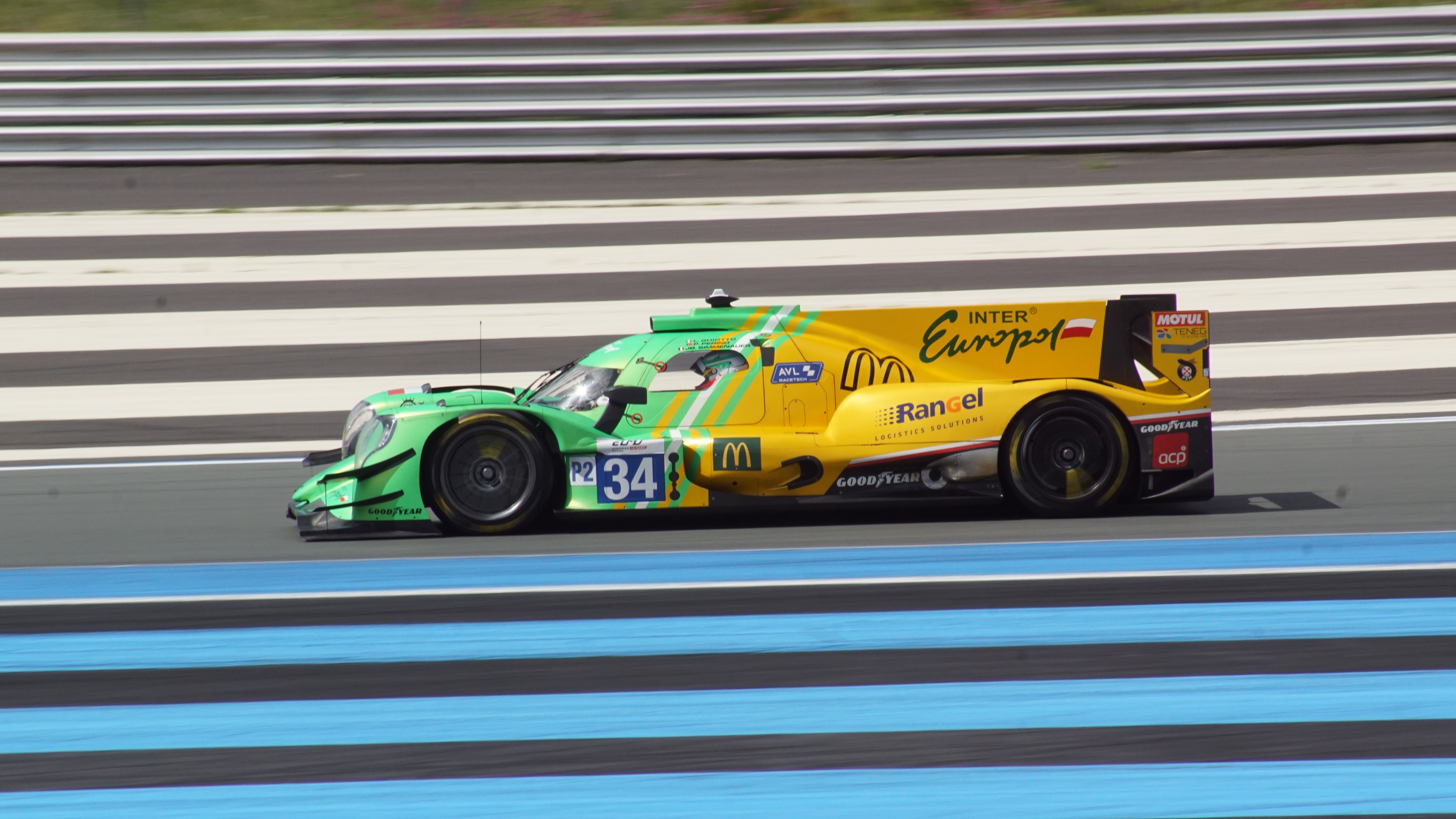
The No. 34 Inter Europol Competition car on Saturday.

The second practice session started at 10:10 CEST on Saturday, with Cairoli once again topping the timing sheets in the No. 9 Oreca with a lap time of 1:49.736. He was 0.311 seconds quicker than Charles Milesi in the No. 48 VDS Panis Racing Oreca. Nick Yelloly was third-quickest in the No. 43 Inter Europol Competition Oreca, 0.358 seconds behind Cairoli. The LMP2 Pro-Am class was topped by Louis Delétraz in the No. 99 AO by TF Oreca, with a 1-minute, 50.309-second lap time. James Allen was second-quickest in the No. 27 Nielsen Racing Oreca. Closmenil kept the lead in the LMP3 class, with a lap time of 1:59.539. Griffin Peebles was second-quickest in the No. 12 WTM by Rinaldi Racing Duqueine, 0.173 seconds behind Closmenil. The No. 50 Ferrari topped the LMGT3 class with Lilou Wadoux behind the wheel: her lap time of 2:03.621 was 0.006 seconds quicker than that of second-placed Tom Fleming in the No. 86 Ferrari. The No. 57 Kessel Racing Ferrari of Ben Tuck rounded out the top three.

Class	No.	Entrant	Driver	Time
LMP2	9	(Germany) Iron Lynx – Proton	(Italy) Matteo Cairoli	1:49.736
LMP2 Pro-Am	99	(United States) AO by TF	(Switzerland) Louis Delétraz	1:50.309
LMP3	17	(Switzerland) CLX Motorsport	(France) Adrien Closmenil	1:59.539
LMGT3	50	(Italy) Richard Mille AF Corse	(France) Lilou Wadoux	2:03.621

- Note: Only the fastest car in each class is shown.

== Qualifying ==
Qualifying started at 14:20 CEST on Saturday, with four sessions of fifteen minutes each, one session for each class. Nick Yelloly claimed pole position in the No. 43 Inter Europol Competition Oreca.

=== Qualifying results ===
Pole position winners in each class are marked in bold.

Pos	Class	No.	Team	Driver	Time	Gap	Grid
1	**LMP2**	**43**	**(Poland) Inter Europol Competition**	**(United Kingdom) Nick Yelloly**	**1:48.741**	—	1
2	LMP2	48	(France) VDS Panis Racing	(France) Charles Milesi	1:48.976	+0.235	2
3	LMP2	9	(Germany) Iron Lynx – Proton	(Italy) Matteo Cairoli	1:49.009	+0.268	3
4	LMP2	18	(France) IDEC Sport	(France) Mathys Jaubert	1:49.206	+0.465	4
5	LMP2	34	(Poland) Inter Europol Competition	(Italy) Luca Ghiotto	1:49.436	+0.695	5
6	LMP2	37	(Lithuania) CLX – Pure Rxcing	(United Kingdom) Tom Blomqvist	1:49.502	+0.761	6
7	LMP2	28	(France) IDEC Sport	(France) Paul-Loup Chatin	1:49.503	+0.762	7
8	LMP2	30	(France) Duqueine Team	(France) Reshad de Gerus	1:49.583	+0.842	8
9	LMP2	25	(Portugal) Algarve Pro Racing	(France) Théo Pourchaire	1:49.778	+1.037	9
10	LMP2	47	(Switzerland) CLX Motorsport	(Brazil) Enzo Fittipaldi	1:49.817	+1.076	10
11	LMP2	10	(United Kingdom) Vector Sport	(Brazil) Pietro Fittipaldi	1:49.894	+1.153	11
12	LMP2	24	(United Kingdom) Nielsen Racing	(Austria) Ferdinand Habsburg	1:49.906	+1.165	12
13	LMP2	22	(United Kingdom) United Autosports	(United Kingdom) Ben Hanley	1:50.029	+1.288	13
14	**LMP2 Pro-Am**	**99**	**(United States) AO by TF**	**(United States) P. J. Hyett**	**1:51.442**	**+2.701**	14
15	LMP2 Pro-Am	77	(Germany) Proton Competition	(Italy) Giorgio Roda	1:51.586	+2.845	15
16	LMP2 Pro-Am	29	(France) TDS Racing	(United States) Rodrigo Sales	1:52.353	+3.612	16
17	LMP2 Pro-Am	3	(Luxembourg) DKR Engineering	(Greece) Georgios Kolovos	1:53.053	+4.312	17
18	LMP2 Pro-Am	21	(United Kingdom) United Autosports	(Brazil) Daniel Schneider	1:53.495	+4.754	18
19	LMP2 Pro-Am	27	(United Kingdom) Nielsen Racing	(United Kingdom) Anthony Wells	1:53.864	+5.123	19
20	LMP2 Pro-Am	20	(Portugal) Algarve Pro Racing	(Greece) Kriton Lendoudis	1:56.533	+7.792	20
21	**LMP3**	**17**	**(Switzerland) CLX Motorsport**	**(France) Adrien Closmenil**	**1:57.194**	**+8.453**	22
22	LMP3	8	(Poland) Team Virage	(Netherlands) Rik Koen	1:58.119	+9.378	23
23	LMP3	12	(Germany) WTM by Rinaldi Racing	(Australia) Griffin Peebles	1:58.186	+9.445	24
24	LMP3	11	(Italy) EuroInternational	(Mexico) Ian Aguilera	1:58.267	+9.526	25
25	LMP3	15	(United Kingdom) RLR MSport	(France) Gillian Henrion	1:58.321	+9.580	26
26	LMP3	68	(France) M Racing	(France) Quentin Antonel	1:58.412	+9.671	27
27	LMP3	88	(Poland) Inter Europol Competition	(United States) Reece Gold	1:58.579	+9.838	28
28	LMP3	4	(Luxembourg) DKR Engineering	(United States) Wyatt Brichacek	1:58.871	+10.130	29
29	LMP3	31	(France) Racing Spirit of Léman	(France) Marius Fossard	1:58.940	+10.199	30
30	LMP3	35	(France) Ultimate	(France) Jean-Baptiste Lahaye	1:59.112	+10.371	31
31	**LMGT3**	**59**	**(France) Racing Spirit of Léman**	**(France) Clément Mateu**	**2:04.641**	**+15.900**	32
32	LMGT3	55	(Switzerland) Spirit of Race	(United Kingdom) Duncan Cameron	2:05.364	+16.623	33
33	LMGT3	63	(Italy) Iron Lynx	(Singapore) Martin Berry	2:05.417	+16.676	34
34	LMGT3	50	(Italy) Richard Mille AF Corse	(Brazil) Custodio Toledo	2:05.500	+16.759	35
35	LMGT3	74	(Switzerland) Kessel Racing	(United Kingdom) Andrew Gilbert	2:05.673	+16.932	36
36	LMGT3	85	(Italy) Iron Dames	(France) Célia Martin	2:05.712	+16.971	37
37	LMGT3	82	(United Kingdom) TF Sport	(Japan) Hiroshi Koizumi	2:06.136	+17.395	38
38	LMGT3	60	(Germany) Proton Competition	(Germany) Christian Ried	2:06.441	+17.700	39
39	LMGT3	51	(Italy) AF Corse	(France) Charles-Henri Samani	2:06.683	+17.942	40
40	LMGT3	66	(United Kingdom) JMW Motorsport	(United States) Scott Noble	2:06.741	+18.000	41
41	LMGT3	57	(Switzerland) Kessel Racing	(Japan) Takeshi Kimura	2:06.806	+18.065	42
42	LMGT3	86	(United Kingdom) GR Racing	(United Kingdom) Michael Wainwright	2:07.261	+18.520	43
43	LMGT3	23	(United Kingdom) United Autosports	(United Kingdom) Michael Birch	2:08.501	+19.760	44
44	LMP2 Pro-Am	83	(Italy) AF Corse	(France) François Perrodo	No time set (Note: The No. 83 AF Corse Oreca did not set a lap time as François Perrodo had to leave the circuit to attend business matters. Per ELMS regulations, the car started from the back of the LMP2 Pro-Am class.)		21

== Race ==
The race started at 12:00 CEST on Sunday, and ran for 4 hours.

=== Race results ===
The minimum number of laps for classification (70% of overall winning car's distance) was 74 laps. Class winners are in bold and ‡.

Pos	Class	No	Team	Drivers	Chassis	Tyre	Laps	Time/Retired
Pos	Class	No	Team	Drivers	Engine	Tyre	Laps	Time/Retired
1	**LMP2**	**18**	**(France) IDEC Sport**	**(United Kingdom) Jamie Chadwick (France) Mathys Jaubert (Spain) Daniel Juncadella**	**Oreca 07**	G	**107**	**4:01:44.201‡**
1	**LMP2**	**18**	**(France) IDEC Sport**	**(United Kingdom) Jamie Chadwick (France) Mathys Jaubert (Spain) Daniel Juncadella**	**Gibson GK428 4.2 L V8**	G	**107**	**4:01:44.201‡**
2	**LMP2 Pro-Am**	**27**	**(United Kingdom) Nielsen Racing**	**(Australia) James Allen (Brazil) Sérgio Sette Câmara (United Kingdom) Anthony Wells**	**Oreca 07**	G	**107**	**+1.885‡**
2	**LMP2 Pro-Am**	**27**	**(United Kingdom) Nielsen Racing**	**(Australia) James Allen (Brazil) Sérgio Sette Câmara (United Kingdom) Anthony Wells**	**Gibson GK428 4.2 L V8**	G	**107**	**+1.885‡**
3	LMP2 Pro-Am	99	(United States) AO by TF	(United States) Dane Cameron (Switzerland) Louis Delétraz (United States) P. J. Hyett	Oreca 07	G	107	+6.165
3	LMP2 Pro-Am	99	(United States) AO by TF	(United States) Dane Cameron (Switzerland) Louis Delétraz (United States) P. J. Hyett	Gibson GK428 4.2 L V8	G	107	+6.165
4	LMP2	43	(Poland) Inter Europol Competition	(France) Tom Dillmann (Poland) Jakub Śmiechowski (United Kingdom) Nick Yelloly	Oreca 07	G	107	+10.293
4	LMP2	43	(Poland) Inter Europol Competition	(France) Tom Dillmann (Poland) Jakub Śmiechowski (United Kingdom) Nick Yelloly	Gibson GK428 4.2 L V8	G	107	+10.293
5	LMP2 Pro-Am	29	(France) TDS Racing	(Switzerland) Mathias Beche (France) Clément Novalak (United States) Rodrigo Sales	Oreca 07	G	107	+14.038
5	LMP2 Pro-Am	29	(France) TDS Racing	(Switzerland) Mathias Beche (France) Clément Novalak (United States) Rodrigo Sales	Gibson GK428 4.2 L V8	G	107	+14.038
6	LMP2 Pro-Am	77	(Germany) Proton Competition	(Austria) René Binder (Italy) Giorgio Roda (Netherlands) Bent Viscaal	Oreca 07	G	107	+15.071
6	LMP2 Pro-Am	77	(Germany) Proton Competition	(Austria) René Binder (Italy) Giorgio Roda (Netherlands) Bent Viscaal	Gibson GK428 4.2 L V8	G	107	+15.071
7	LMP2 Pro-Am	21	(United Kingdom) United Autosports	(United Kingdom) Oliver Jarvis (Japan) Marino Sato (Brazil) Daniel Schneider	Oreca 07	G	107	+51.556
7	LMP2 Pro-Am	21	(United Kingdom) United Autosports	(United Kingdom) Oliver Jarvis (Japan) Marino Sato (Brazil) Daniel Schneider	Gibson GK428 4.2 L V8	G	107	+51.556
8	LMP2	47	(Switzerland) CLX Motorsport	(Brazil) Pipo Derani (Portugal) Manuel Espírito Santo (Brazil) Enzo Fittipaldi	Oreca 07	G	107	+59.971
8	LMP2	47	(Switzerland) CLX Motorsport	(Brazil) Pipo Derani (Portugal) Manuel Espírito Santo (Brazil) Enzo Fittipaldi	Gibson GK428 4.2 L V8	G	107	+59.971
9	LMP2	10	(United Kingdom) Vector Sport	(Republic of Ireland) Ryan Cullen (Brazil) Pietro Fittipaldi (France) Vladislav Lomko	Oreca 07	G	107	+1:09.141
9	LMP2	10	(United Kingdom) Vector Sport	(Republic of Ireland) Ryan Cullen (Brazil) Pietro Fittipaldi (France) Vladislav Lomko	Gibson GK428 4.2 L V8	G	107	+1:09.141
10	LMP2 Pro-Am	20	(Portugal) Algarve Pro Racing	(United Kingdom) Olli Caldwell (Greece) Kriton Lendoudis (United Kingdom) Alex Quinn	Oreca 07	G	107	+1:25.309
10	LMP2 Pro-Am	20	(Portugal) Algarve Pro Racing	(United Kingdom) Olli Caldwell (Greece) Kriton Lendoudis (United Kingdom) Alex Quinn	Gibson GK428 4.2 L V8	G	107	+1:25.309
11	LMP2	24	(United Kingdom) Nielsen Racing	(Portugal) Filipe Albuquerque (Turkey) Cem Bölükbaşı (Austria) Ferdinand Habsburg	Oreca 07	G	107	+1:28.243
11	LMP2	24	(United Kingdom) Nielsen Racing	(Portugal) Filipe Albuquerque (Turkey) Cem Bölükbaşı (Austria) Ferdinand Habsburg	Gibson GK428 4.2 L V8	G	107	+1:28.243
12	LMP2	48	(France) VDS Panis Racing	(United Kingdom) Oliver Gray (France) Esteban Masson (France) Charles Milesi	Oreca 07	G	107	+1:28.376
12	LMP2	48	(France) VDS Panis Racing	(United Kingdom) Oliver Gray (France) Esteban Masson (France) Charles Milesi	Gibson GK428 4.2 L V8	G	107	+1:28.376
13	LMP2	30	(France) Duqueine Team	(France) Reshad de Gerus (Israel) Roy Nissany (Italy) Francesco Simonazzi	Oreca 07	G	107	+1:34.199
13	LMP2	30	(France) Duqueine Team	(France) Reshad de Gerus (Israel) Roy Nissany (Italy) Francesco Simonazzi	Gibson GK428 4.2 L V8	G	107	+1:34.199
14	LMP2	25	(Portugal) Algarve Pro Racing	(Spain) Lorenzo Fluxá (Liechtenstein) Matthias Kaiser (France) Théo Pourchaire	Oreca 07	G	107	+1:34.582
14	LMP2	25	(Portugal) Algarve Pro Racing	(Spain) Lorenzo Fluxá (Liechtenstein) Matthias Kaiser (France) Théo Pourchaire	Gibson GK428 4.2 L V8	G	107	+1:34.582
15	LMP2	22	(United Kingdom) United Autosports	(United Kingdom) Ben Hanley (Venezuela) Manuel Maldonado (Switzerland) Grégoire Saucy	Oreca 07	G	106	+1 Lap
15	LMP2	22	(United Kingdom) United Autosports	(United Kingdom) Ben Hanley (Venezuela) Manuel Maldonado (Switzerland) Grégoire Saucy	Gibson GK428 4.2 L V8	G	106	+1 Lap
16	LMP2 Pro-Am	3	(Luxembourg) DKR Engineering	(Germany) Laurents Hörr (Greece) Georgios Kolovos (France) Thomas Laurent	Oreca 07	G	106	+1 Lap
16	LMP2 Pro-Am	3	(Luxembourg) DKR Engineering	(Germany) Laurents Hörr (Greece) Georgios Kolovos (France) Thomas Laurent	Gibson GK428 4.2 L V8	G	106	+1 Lap
17	LMP2	34	(Poland) Inter Europol Competition	(Italy) Luca Ghiotto (Mozambique) Pedro Perino (France) Jean-Baptiste Simmenauer	Oreca 07	G	103	+4 Laps
17	LMP2	34	(Poland) Inter Europol Competition	(Italy) Luca Ghiotto (Mozambique) Pedro Perino (France) Jean-Baptiste Simmenauer	Gibson GK428 4.2 L V8	G	103	+4 Laps
18	LMP2	28	(France) IDEC Sport	(France) Paul-Loup Chatin (France) Paul Lafargue (Netherlands) Job van Uitert	Oreca 07	G	102	+5 Laps
18	LMP2	28	(France) IDEC Sport	(France) Paul-Loup Chatin (France) Paul Lafargue (Netherlands) Job van Uitert	Gibson GK428 4.2 L V8	G	102	+5 Laps
19	**LMP3**	**17**	**(Switzerland) CLX Motorsport**	**(France) Adrien Closmenil (Denmark) Theodor Jensen (France) Paul Lanchère**	**Ligier JS P325**	MI	**101**	**+6 Laps‡**
19	**LMP3**	**17**	**(Switzerland) CLX Motorsport**	**(France) Adrien Closmenil (Denmark) Theodor Jensen (France) Paul Lanchère**	**Toyota V35A-FTS 3.5 L Turbo V6**	MI	**101**	**+6 Laps‡**
20	LMP3	68	(France) M Racing	(France) Quentin Antonel (France) Stéphane Tribaudini	Ligier JS P325	MI	101	+6 Laps
20	LMP3	68	(France) M Racing	(France) Quentin Antonel (France) Stéphane Tribaudini	Toyota V35A-FTS 3.5 L Turbo V6	MI	101	+6 Laps
21	LMP3	11	(Italy) EuroInternational	(Mexico) Ian Aguilera (France) Fabien Michal	Ligier JS P325	MI	101	+6 Laps
21	LMP3	11	(Italy) EuroInternational	(Mexico) Ian Aguilera (France) Fabien Michal	Toyota V35A-FTS 3.5 L Turbo V6	MI	101	+6 Laps
22	LMP3	88	(Poland) Inter Europol Competition	(United Kingdom) Tim Creswick (Belgium) Douwe Dedecker (United States) Reece Gold	Ligier JS P325	MI	100	+7 Laps
22	LMP3	88	(Poland) Inter Europol Competition	(United Kingdom) Tim Creswick (Belgium) Douwe Dedecker (United States) Reece Gold	Toyota V35A-FTS 3.5 L Turbo V6	MI	100	+7 Laps
23	LMP3	4	(Luxembourg) DKR Engineering	(United States) Wyatt Brichacek (Denmark) Mikkel Gaarde Pedersen (Estonia) Antti Rammo	Ginetta G61-LT-P3 Evo	MI	100	+7 Laps
23	LMP3	4	(Luxembourg) DKR Engineering	(United States) Wyatt Brichacek (Denmark) Mikkel Gaarde Pedersen (Estonia) Antti Rammo	Toyota V35A-FTS 3.5 L Turbo V6	MI	100	+7 Laps
24	LMP3	35	(France) Ultimate	(France) Jean-Baptiste Lahaye (France) Matthieu Lahaye (France) Louis Stern	Ligier JS P325	MI	100	+7 Laps
24	LMP3	35	(France) Ultimate	(France) Jean-Baptiste Lahaye (France) Matthieu Lahaye (France) Louis Stern	Toyota V35A-FTS 3.5 L Turbo V6	MI	100	+7 Laps
25	LMP3	31	(France) Racing Spirit of Léman	(France) Marius Fossard (France) Jean-Ludovic Foubert (France) Jacques Wolff	Ligier JS P325	MI	100	+7 Laps
25	LMP3	31	(France) Racing Spirit of Léman	(France) Marius Fossard (France) Jean-Ludovic Foubert (France) Jacques Wolff	Toyota V35A-FTS 3.5 L Turbo V6	MI	100	+7 Laps
26	**LMGT3**	**50**	**(Italy) Richard Mille AF Corse**	**(Italy) Riccardo Agostini (Brazil) Custodio Toledo (France) Lilou Wadoux**	**Ferrari 296 GT3**	G	**100**	**+7 Laps‡**
26	**LMGT3**	**50**	**(Italy) Richard Mille AF Corse**	**(Italy) Riccardo Agostini (Brazil) Custodio Toledo (France) Lilou Wadoux**	**Ferrari F163CE 3.0 L Turbo V6**	G	**100**	**+7 Laps‡**
27	LMGT3	63	(Italy) Iron Lynx	(Singapore) Martin Berry (United Kingdom) Lorcan Hanafin (Germany) Fabian Schiller	Mercedes-AMG GT3 Evo	G	100	+7 Laps
27	LMGT3	63	(Italy) Iron Lynx	(Singapore) Martin Berry (United Kingdom) Lorcan Hanafin (Germany) Fabian Schiller	Mercedes-AMG M159 6.2 L V8	G	100	+7 Laps
28	LMGT3	86	(United Kingdom) GR Racing	(United Kingdom) Tom Fleming (Italy) Riccardo Pera (United Kingdom) Michael Wainwright	Ferrari 296 GT3	G	100	+7 Laps
28	LMGT3	86	(United Kingdom) GR Racing	(United Kingdom) Tom Fleming (Italy) Riccardo Pera (United Kingdom) Michael Wainwright	Ferrari F163CE 3.0 L Turbo V6	G	100	+7 Laps
29	LMGT3	55	(Switzerland) Spirit of Race	(United Kingdom) Duncan Cameron (Republic of Ireland) Matt Griffin (South Africa) David Perel	Ferrari 296 GT3	G	100	+7 Laps
29	LMGT3	55	(Switzerland) Spirit of Race	(United Kingdom) Duncan Cameron (Republic of Ireland) Matt Griffin (South Africa) David Perel	Ferrari F163CE 3.0 L Turbo V6	G	100	+7 Laps
30	LMGT3	51	(Italy) AF Corse	(Denmark) Conrad Laursen (Italy) Davide Rigon (France) Charles-Henri Samani	Ferrari 296 GT3	G	100	+7 Laps
30	LMGT3	51	(Italy) AF Corse	(Denmark) Conrad Laursen (Italy) Davide Rigon (France) Charles-Henri Samani	Ferrari F163CE 3.0 L Turbo V6	G	100	+7 Laps
31	LMGT3	59	(France) Racing Spirit of Léman	(France) Erwan Bastard (France) Valentin Hasse-Clot (France) Clément Mateu	Aston Martin Vantage AMR GT3 Evo	G	100	+7 Laps
31	LMGT3	59	(France) Racing Spirit of Léman	(France) Erwan Bastard (France) Valentin Hasse-Clot (France) Clément Mateu	Aston Martin M177 4.0 L Turbo V8	G	100	+7 Laps
32	LMGT3	85	(Italy) Iron Dames	(Belgium) Sarah Bovy (Denmark) Michelle Gatting (France) Célia Martin	Porsche 911 GT3 R (992)	G	100	+7 Laps
32	LMGT3	85	(Italy) Iron Dames	(Belgium) Sarah Bovy (Denmark) Michelle Gatting (France) Célia Martin	Porsche M97/80 4.2 L Flat-6	G	100	+7 Laps
33	LMGT3	60	(Germany) Proton Competition	(Italy) Matteo Cressoni (Belgium) Alessio Picariello (Germany) Christian Ried	Porsche 911 GT3 R (992)	G	99	+8 Laps
33	LMGT3	60	(Germany) Proton Competition	(Italy) Matteo Cressoni (Belgium) Alessio Picariello (Germany) Christian Ried	Porsche M97/80 4.2 L Flat-6	G	99	+8 Laps
34	LMGT3	57	(Switzerland) Kessel Racing	(United Kingdom) James Calado (Japan) Takeshi Kimura (United Kingdom) Ben Tuck	Ferrari 296 GT3	G	99	+8 Laps
34	LMGT3	57	(Switzerland) Kessel Racing	(United Kingdom) James Calado (Japan) Takeshi Kimura (United Kingdom) Ben Tuck	Ferrari F163CE 3.0 L Turbo V6	G	99	+8 Laps
35	LMGT3	66	(United Kingdom) JMW Motorsport	(Italy) Gianmaria Bruni (United States) Jason Hart (United States) Scott Noble	Ferrari 296 GT3	G	99	+8 Laps
35	LMGT3	66	(United Kingdom) JMW Motorsport	(Italy) Gianmaria Bruni (United States) Jason Hart (United States) Scott Noble	Ferrari F163CE 3.0 L Turbo V6	G	99	+8 Laps
36	LMGT3	23	(United Kingdom) United Autosports	(United Kingdom) Michael Birch (United Kingdom) Wayne Boyd (Australia) Garnet Patterson	McLaren 720S GT3 Evo	G	99	+8 Laps
36	LMGT3	23	(United Kingdom) United Autosports	(United Kingdom) Michael Birch (United Kingdom) Wayne Boyd (Australia) Garnet Patterson	McLaren M840T 4.0 L Turbo V8	G	99	+8 Laps
37	LMP2 Pro-Am	83	(Italy) AF Corse	(Denmark) Nicklas Nielsen (France) François Perrodo (France) Matthieu Vaxivière	Oreca 07	G	98	+9 Laps
37	LMP2 Pro-Am	83	(Italy) AF Corse	(Denmark) Nicklas Nielsen (France) François Perrodo (France) Matthieu Vaxivière	Gibson GK428 4.2 L V8	G	98	+9 Laps
Not classified
	LMGT3	82	(United Kingdom) TF Sport	(Angola) Rui Andrade (Republic of Ireland) Charlie Eastwood (Japan) Hiroshi Koizumi	Chevrolet Corvette Z06 GT3.R	G	95	Did not finish
	LMGT3	82	(United Kingdom) TF Sport	(Angola) Rui Andrade (Republic of Ireland) Charlie Eastwood (Japan) Hiroshi Koizumi	Chevrolet LT6.R 5.5 L V8	G	95	Did not finish
	LMP3	12	(Germany) WTM by Rinaldi Racing	(Germany) Torsten Kratz (Australia) Griffin Peebles (Germany) Leonard Weiss	Duqueine D09	MI	80	Did not finish
	LMP3	12	(Germany) WTM by Rinaldi Racing	(Germany) Torsten Kratz (Australia) Griffin Peebles (Germany) Leonard Weiss	Toyota V35A-FTS 3.5 L Turbo V6	MI	80	Did not finish
	LMP2	9	(Germany) Iron Lynx – Proton	(Italy) Matteo Cairoli (France) Macéo Capietto (Germany) Jonas Ried	Oreca 07	G	78	Did not finish
	LMP2	9	(Germany) Iron Lynx – Proton	(Italy) Matteo Cairoli (France) Macéo Capietto (Germany) Jonas Ried	Gibson GK428 4.2 L V8	G	78	Did not finish
	LMP3	15	(United Kingdom) RLR MSport	(United Kingdom) Nick Adcock (France) Gillian Henrion (Denmark) Michael Jensen	Ligier JS P325	MI	69	Did not finish
	LMP3	15	(United Kingdom) RLR MSport	(United Kingdom) Nick Adcock (France) Gillian Henrion (Denmark) Michael Jensen	Toyota V35A-FTS 3.5 L Turbo V6	MI	69	Did not finish
	LMGT3	74	(Switzerland) Kessel Racing	(United Kingdom) Andrew Gilbert (Spain) Miguel Molina (Spain) Fran Rueda	Ferrari 296 GT3	G	48	Did not finish
	LMGT3	74	(Switzerland) Kessel Racing	(United Kingdom) Andrew Gilbert (Spain) Miguel Molina (Spain) Fran Rueda	Ferrari F163CE 3.0 L Turbo V6	G	48	Did not finish
	LMP2	37	(Lithuania) CLX – Pure Rxcing	(United Kingdom) Tom Blomqvist (United Kingdom) Alex Malykhin (France) Tristan Vautier	Oreca 07	G	20	Did not finish
	LMP2	37	(Lithuania) CLX – Pure Rxcing	(United Kingdom) Tom Blomqvist (United Kingdom) Alex Malykhin (France) Tristan Vautier	Gibson GK428 4.2 L V8	G	20	Did not finish
	LMP3	8	(Poland) Team Virage	(Netherlands) Rik Koen (Spain) Daniel Nogales (Poland) Jacek Zielonka	Ligier JS P325	MI	1	Did not finish
	LMP3	8	(Poland) Team Virage	(Netherlands) Rik Koen (Spain) Daniel Nogales (Poland) Jacek Zielonka	Toyota V35A-FTS 3.5 L Turbo V6	MI	1	Did not finish

== Notes ==
=== Qualifying ===
European Le Mans Series
Previous race: 4 Hours of Barcelona	2025 season	Next race: 4 Hours of Imola
