= 2025 4 Hours of Imola =

Endurance sportscar racing event

The layout of the Imola Circuit

The 2025 4 Hours of Imola was a endurance sportscar racing event, held between 4 and 6 July 2025 at Imola Circuit in Imola, Italy. It was the third of six rounds of the 2025 European Le Mans Series season, and the seventh running of the event as part of the championship.

== Entry list ==
The provisional entry list was published on 25 June 2025 and consisted of 44 entries across 4 categories – 13 in LMP2, 8 in LMP2 Pro-Am, 10 in LMP3, and 13 in LMGT3. Alessio Rovera returned to the cockpit of the No. 83 AF Corse Oreca in the LMP2 Pro-Am class, having been replaced by Nicklas Nielsen at the previous round. In the LMGT3 class, Daniel Serra stepped in for James Calado in the No. 57 Kessel Racing Ferrari. Meanwhile, Christian Ried drove the No. 60 Proton Competition Porsche, having initially been drafted as a substitute for Claudio Schiavoni during the Le Castellet round.

== Schedule ==
Date	Time (local: CEST)	Event
Friday, 4 July	10:15	Free Practice 1
Friday, 4 July	15:15	Bronze Driver Collective Test
Saturday, 5 July	10:50	Free Practice 2
Saturday, 5 July	14:30	Qualifying – LMGT3
Saturday, 5 July	14:55	Qualifying – LMP3
Saturday, 5 July	15:20	Qualifying – LMP2 Pro-Am
Saturday, 5 July	15:45	Qualifying – LMP2
Sunday, 6 July	12:00	Race

== Free practice ==
Two practice sessions were held before the event: one on Friday and one on Saturday. Both sessions ran for 90 minutes.

=== Practice 1 ===
The first practice session started at 10:15 CEST on Friday. Ben Hanley topped the session in the No. 22 United Autosports Oreca, with a lap time of 1:31.878. He was 0.266 seconds quicker than second-placed Théo Pourchaire in the No. 25 Algarve Pro Racing Oreca, with Nick Yelloly's No. 43 Inter Europol Competition Oreca rounding out the top three. Mathias Beche topped the LMP2 Pro-Am class in the No. 29 TDS Racing, with a 1-minute, 32.491-second lap time. Griffin Peebles topped the LMP3 class in the No. 12 WTM by Rinaldi Racing Duqueine, with a lap time of 1:39.787. Quentin Antonel was second-quickest in the No. 68 M Racing Ligier, 0.064 seconds behind Peebles. Charlie Eastwood topped the LMGT3 class in the No. 82 TF Sport Corvette, with a lap time of 1:42.827, which was 0.187 seconds quicker than second-placed Davide Rigon's lap time in the No. 51 AF Corse Ferrari. Daniel Serra was third-quickest in the No. 57 Kessel Racing Ferrari, 0.194 seconds behind Eastwood.

Class	No.	Entrant	Driver	Time
LMP2	22	(United Kingdom) United Autosports	(United Kingdom) Ben Hanley	1:31.878
LMP2 Pro-Am	29	(France) TDS Racing	(Switzerland) Mathias Beche	1:32.491
LMP3	12	(Germany) WTM by Rinaldi Racing	(Australia) Griffin Peebles	1:39.787
LMGT3	82	(United Kingdom) TF Sport	(Republic of Ireland) Charlie Eastwood	1:42.827

- Note: Only the fastest car in each class is shown.

=== Practice 2 ===
The second and final practice session started at 10:50 CEST on Saturday. Daniel Juncadella topped the session in the No. 18 IDEC Sport Oreca, with a lap time of 1:31.426. He was 0.056 seconds quicker than Pietro Fittipaldi in the No. 10 Vector Sport Oreca, with Job van Uitert in the No. 28 IDEC Sport Oreca rounding out the top three. Alex Quinn topped the LMP2 Pro-Am class in the No. 20 Algarve Pro Racing Oreca, with a 1-minute, 32.028-second lap time. Reece Gold topped the LMP3 class in the No. 88 Inter Europol Competition with a lap time of 1:40.160, 0.014 seconds quicker than Adrien Closmenil in the No. 17 CLX Motorsport Ligier. Valentin Hasse-Clot's 1-minute, 42.141-second lap time saw the No. 59 Racing Spirit of Léman Aston Martin top the LMGT3 class, which was 0.334 seconds quicker than Ben Tuck in the No. 57 Ferrari. Lorcan Hanafin was third-quickest in the No. 63 Iron Lynx Mercedes.

Class	No.	Entrant	Driver	Time
LMP2	18	(France) IDEC Sport	(Spain) Daniel Juncadella	1:31.426
LMP2 Pro-Am	20	(Portugal) Algarve Pro Racing	(United Kingdom) Alex Quinn	1:32.028
LMP3	88	(Poland) Inter Europol Competition	(United States) Reece Gold	1:40.160
LMGT3	59	(France) Racing Spirit of Léman	(France) Valentin Hasse-Clot	1:42.141

- Note: Only the fastest car in each class is shown.

== Qualifying ==
Qualifying started at 14:30 CEST on Saturday, with four sessions of fifteen minutes each, one session for each class. During the LMP3 qualifying session, a rainstorm started over the region, which caused the LMP2 Pro-Am and LMP2 sessions to be significantly delayed. After qualifying, ELMS arranged the grid to put the LMP2s ahead of the LMP2 Pro-Am, LMP3, and LMGT3 cars. Théo Pourchaire claimed overall pole position for the event in the No. 25 Algarve Pro Racing Oreca, ahead of Luca Ghiotto in the No. 34 Inter Europol Competition Oreca and Macéo Capietto in the No. 9 Iron Lynx – Proton Oreca.

=== Qualifying results ===
Pole position winners in each class are marked in bold.

Pos	Class	No.	Team	Driver	Time	Gap	Grid
1	**LMP2**	**25**	**(Portugal) Algarve Pro Racing**	**(France) Théo Pourchaire**	**1:37.919**	—	1
2	LMP2	34	(Poland) Inter Europol Competition	(Italy) Luca Ghiotto	1:38.890	+0.971	2
3	LMP2	9	(Germany) Iron Lynx – Proton	(France) Macéo Capietto	1:39.439	+1.520	3
4	LMP2	43	(Poland) Inter Europol Competition	(United Kingdom) Nick Yelloly	1:40.108	+2.189	4
5	LMP2	30	(France) Duqueine Team	(France) Reshad de Gerus	1:40.268	+2.349	5
6	LMP2	24	(United Kingdom) Nielsen Racing	(Portugal) Filipe Albuquerque	1:40.296	+2.377	6
7	LMP2	48	(France) VDS Panis Racing	(France) Charles Milesi	1:40.514	+2.595	7
8	LMP2	28	(France) IDEC Sport	(Netherlands) Job van Uitert	1:40.850	+2.931	8
9	LMP2	18	(France) IDEC Sport	(Spain) Daniel Juncadella	1:41.065	+3.146	9
10	LMP2	22	(United Kingdom) United Autosports	(United Kingdom) Ben Hanley	1:41.412	+3.493	10
11	LMP2	47	(Switzerland) CLX Motorsport	(Brazil) Enzo Fittipaldi	1:41.542	+3.623	11
12	LMP2	10	(United Kingdom) Vector Sport	(Brazil) Pietro Fittipaldi	1:42.240	+4.321	12
13	**LMGT3**	**63**	**(Italy) Iron Lynx**	**(Singapore) Martin Berry**	**1:43.799**	**+5.880**	32
14	LMGT3	59	(France) Racing Spirit of Léman	(France) Clément Mateu	1:43.926	+6.007	33
15	LMGT3	85	(Italy) Iron Dames	(France) Célia Martin	1:44.085	+6.166	34
16	LMGT3	57	(Switzerland) Kessel Racing	(Japan) Takeshi Kimura	1:44.496	+6.577	35
17	LMGT3	74	(Switzerland) Kessel Racing	(United Kingdom) Andrew Gilbert	1:45.118	+7.199	36
18	LMGT3	55	(Switzerland) Spirit of Race	(United Kingdom) Duncan Cameron	1:45.202	+7.283	37
19	LMGT3	66	(United Kingdom) JMW Motorsport	(United States) Scott Noble	1:45.305	+7.386	38
20	LMGT3	82	(United Kingdom) TF Sport	(Japan) Hiroshi Koizumi	1:45.406	+7.487	39
21	LMGT3	51	(Italy) AF Corse	(France) Charles-Henri Samani	1:45.786	+7.867	40
22	**LMP3**	**17**	**(Switzerland) CLX Motorsport**	**(Denmark) Theodor Jensen**	**1:45.844**	**+7.925**	22
23	LMGT3	60	(Germany) Proton Competition	(Germany) Christian Ried	1:46.127	+8.208	41
24	LMGT3	86	(United Kingdom) GR Racing	(United Kingdom) Michael Wainwright	1:46.201	+8.282	42
25	LMP3	11	(Italy) EuroInternational	(Mexico) Ian Aguilera	1:46.599	+8.680	23
26	LMP3	68	(France) M Racing	(France) Quentin Antonel	1:47.275	+9.356	24
27	LMGT3	23	(United Kingdom) United Autosports	(United Kingdom) Michael Birch	1:47.304	+9.385	43
28	**LMP2 Pro-Am**	**77**	**(Germany) Proton Competition**	**(Italy) Giorgio Roda**	**1:47.528**	**+9.609**	14
29	LMP3	4	(Luxembourg) DKR Engineering	(Denmark) Mikkel Gaarde Pedersen	1:47.765	+9.846	25
30	LMP3	88	(Poland) Inter Europol Competition	(United States) Reece Gold	1:47.827	+9.908	26
31	LMP3	35	(France) Ultimate	(France) Jean-Baptiste Lahaye	1:48.252	+10.333	27
32	LMP3	31	(France) Racing Spirit of Léman	(France) Marius Fossard	1:48.401	+10.482	28
33	LMP3	8	(Poland) Team Virage	(Spain) Daniel Nogales	1:48.671	+10.752	29
34	LMP3	12	(Germany) WTM by Rinaldi Racing	(Australia) Griffin Peebles	1:48.971	+11.052	30
35	LMP3	15	(United Kingdom) RLR MSport	(France) Gillian Henrion	1:49.041	+11.122	31
36	LMP2 Pro-Am	99	(United States) AO by TF	(United States) P. J. Hyett	1:50.464	+12.545	15
37	LMP2 Pro-Am	3	(Luxembourg) DKR Engineering	(Greece) Georgios Kolovos	1:51.352	+13.433	16
38	LMP2 Pro-Am	29	(France) TDS Racing	(United States) Rodrigo Sales	1:51.955	+14.036	17
39	LMP2 Pro-Am	83	(Italy) AF Corse	(France) François Perrodo	1:53.027	+15.108	18
40	LMP2 Pro-Am	20	(Portugal) Algarve Pro Racing	(Greece) Kriton Lendoudis	1:55.020	+17.101	19
41	LMP2 Pro-Am	21	(United Kingdom) United Autosports	(Brazil) Daniel Schneider	1:55.144	+17.225	20
42	LMP2 Pro-Am	27	(United Kingdom) Nielsen Racing	(United Kingdom) Anthony Wells	No time set (Note: The No. 27 Nielsen Racing Oreca had all of its lap times deleted after causing a red flag in the LMP2 Pro-Am qualifying session. Per ELMS regulations, the car started from the back of the LMP2 Pro-Am class.)		21
43	LMP2	37	(Lithuania) CLX – Pure Rxcing	(France) Tristan Vautier	No time set (Note: The No. 37 CLX – Pure Rxcing Oreca had all of its lap times deleted after causing a red flag in the LMP2 qualifying session. Per ELMS regulations, the car started from the back of the LMP2 class.)		13
44	LMGT3	50	(Italy) Richard Mille AF Corse	(Brazil) Custodio Toledo	No time set (Note: The No. 50 Richard Mille AF Corse Ferrari had all of its lap times deleted after causing a red flag in the LMGT3 qualifying session. Per ELMS regulations, the car started from the back of the LMGT3 class.)		44

== Race ==
The race started at 12:00 CEST on Sunday. It was originally scheduled to run for 4 hours, but the race was extended by 20 minutes after a multi-car pile-up red-flagged the session during the first hour.

=== Race results ===
The minimum number of laps for classification (70% of overall winning car's distance) was 88 laps. Class winners are in bold and ‡.

Pos	Class	No	Team	Drivers	Chassis	Tyre	Laps	Time/Retired
Pos	Class	No	Team	Drivers	Engine	Tyre	Laps	Time/Retired
1	**LMP2**	**48**	**(France) VDS Panis Racing**	**(United Kingdom) Oliver Gray (France) Esteban Masson (France) Charles Milesi**	**Oreca 07**	G	**126**	**4:22:08.499‡**
1	**LMP2**	**48**	**(France) VDS Panis Racing**	**(United Kingdom) Oliver Gray (France) Esteban Masson (France) Charles Milesi**	**Gibson GK428 4.2 L V8**	G	**126**	**4:22:08.499‡**
2	LMP2	43	(Poland) Inter Europol Competition	(France) Tom Dillmann (Poland) Jakub Śmiechowski (United Kingdom) Nick Yelloly	Oreca 07	G	126	+8.856
2	LMP2	43	(Poland) Inter Europol Competition	(France) Tom Dillmann (Poland) Jakub Śmiechowski (United Kingdom) Nick Yelloly	Gibson GK428 4.2 L V8	G	126	+8.856
3	LMP2	25	(Portugal) Algarve Pro Racing	(Spain) Lorenzo Fluxá (Liechtenstein) Matthias Kaiser (France) Théo Pourchaire	Oreca 07	G	126	+33.217
3	LMP2	25	(Portugal) Algarve Pro Racing	(Spain) Lorenzo Fluxá (Liechtenstein) Matthias Kaiser (France) Théo Pourchaire	Gibson GK428 4.2 L V8	G	126	+33.217
4	LMP2	9	(Germany) Iron Lynx – Proton	(Italy) Matteo Cairoli (France) Macéo Capietto (Germany) Jonas Ried	Oreca 07	G	126	+59.071
4	LMP2	9	(Germany) Iron Lynx – Proton	(Italy) Matteo Cairoli (France) Macéo Capietto (Germany) Jonas Ried	Gibson GK428 4.2 L V8	G	126	+59.071
5	LMP2	47	(Switzerland) CLX Motorsport	(Brazil) Pipo Derani (Portugal) Manuel Espírito Santo (Brazil) Enzo Fittipaldi	Oreca 07	G	125	+1 Lap
5	LMP2	47	(Switzerland) CLX Motorsport	(Brazil) Pipo Derani (Portugal) Manuel Espírito Santo (Brazil) Enzo Fittipaldi	Gibson GK428 4.2 L V8	G	125	+1 Lap
6	**LMP2 Pro-Am**	**99**	**(United States) AO by TF**	**(United States) Dane Cameron (Switzerland) Louis Delétraz (United States) P. J. Hyett**	**Oreca 07**	G	**125**	**+1 Lap‡**
6	**LMP2 Pro-Am**	**99**	**(United States) AO by TF**	**(United States) Dane Cameron (Switzerland) Louis Delétraz (United States) P. J. Hyett**	**Gibson GK428 4.2 L V8**	G	**125**	**+1 Lap‡**
7	LMP2 Pro-Am	77	(Germany) Proton Competition	(Austria) René Binder (Italy) Giorgio Roda (Netherlands) Bent Viscaal	Oreca 07	G	125	+1 Lap
7	LMP2 Pro-Am	77	(Germany) Proton Competition	(Austria) René Binder (Italy) Giorgio Roda (Netherlands) Bent Viscaal	Gibson GK428 4.2 L V8	G	125	+1 Lap
8	LMP2 Pro-Am	20	(Portugal) Algarve Pro Racing	(United Kingdom) Olli Caldwell (Greece) Kriton Lendoudis (United Kingdom) Alex Quinn	Oreca 07	G	125	+1 Lap
8	LMP2 Pro-Am	20	(Portugal) Algarve Pro Racing	(United Kingdom) Olli Caldwell (Greece) Kriton Lendoudis (United Kingdom) Alex Quinn	Gibson GK428 4.2 L V8	G	125	+1 Lap
9	LMP2 Pro-Am	29	(France) TDS Racing	(Switzerland) Mathias Beche (France) Clément Novalak (United States) Rodrigo Sales	Oreca 07	G	125	+1 Lap
9	LMP2 Pro-Am	29	(France) TDS Racing	(Switzerland) Mathias Beche (France) Clément Novalak (United States) Rodrigo Sales	Gibson GK428 4.2 L V8	G	125	+1 Lap
10	LMP2	34	(Poland) Inter Europol Competition	(Italy) Luca Ghiotto (Mozambique) Pedro Perino (France) Jean-Baptiste Simmenauer	Oreca 07	G	125	+1 Lap
10	LMP2	34	(Poland) Inter Europol Competition	(Italy) Luca Ghiotto (Mozambique) Pedro Perino (France) Jean-Baptiste Simmenauer	Gibson GK428 4.2 L V8	G	125	+1 Lap
11	LMP2	24	(United Kingdom) Nielsen Racing	(Portugal) Filipe Albuquerque (Turkey) Cem Bölükbaşı (Austria) Ferdinand Habsburg	Oreca 07	G	125	+1 Lap
11	LMP2	24	(United Kingdom) Nielsen Racing	(Portugal) Filipe Albuquerque (Turkey) Cem Bölükbaşı (Austria) Ferdinand Habsburg	Gibson GK428 4.2 L V8	G	125	+1 Lap
12	LMP2	22	(United Kingdom) United Autosports	(United Kingdom) Ben Hanley (Venezuela) Manuel Maldonado (Switzerland) Grégoire Saucy	Oreca 07	G	125	+1 Lap
12	LMP2	22	(United Kingdom) United Autosports	(United Kingdom) Ben Hanley (Venezuela) Manuel Maldonado (Switzerland) Grégoire Saucy	Gibson GK428 4.2 L V8	G	125	+1 Lap
13	LMP2 Pro-Am	83	(Italy) AF Corse	(France) François Perrodo (Italy) Alessio Rovera (France) Matthieu Vaxivière	Oreca 07	G	125	+1 Lap
13	LMP2 Pro-Am	83	(Italy) AF Corse	(France) François Perrodo (Italy) Alessio Rovera (France) Matthieu Vaxivière	Gibson GK428 4.2 L V8	G	125	+1 Lap
14	LMP2	30	(France) Duqueine Team	(France) Reshad de Gerus (Israel) Roy Nissany (Italy) Francesco Simonazzi	Oreca 07	G	124	+2 Laps
14	LMP2	30	(France) Duqueine Team	(France) Reshad de Gerus (Israel) Roy Nissany (Italy) Francesco Simonazzi	Gibson GK428 4.2 L V8	G	124	+2 Laps
15	LMP2	37	(Lithuania) CLX – Pure Rxcing	(United Kingdom) Tom Blomqvist (United Kingdom) Alex Malykhin (France) Tristan Vautier	Oreca 07	G	124	+2 Laps
15	LMP2	37	(Lithuania) CLX – Pure Rxcing	(United Kingdom) Tom Blomqvist (United Kingdom) Alex Malykhin (France) Tristan Vautier	Gibson GK428 4.2 L V8	G	124	+2 Laps
16	LMP2 Pro-Am	21	(United Kingdom) United Autosports	(United Kingdom) Oliver Jarvis (Japan) Marino Sato (Brazil) Daniel Schneider	Oreca 07	G	124	+2 Laps
16	LMP2 Pro-Am	21	(United Kingdom) United Autosports	(United Kingdom) Oliver Jarvis (Japan) Marino Sato (Brazil) Daniel Schneider	Gibson GK428 4.2 L V8	G	124	+2 Laps
17	LMP2	18	(France) IDEC Sport	(United Kingdom) Jamie Chadwick (France) Mathys Jaubert (Spain) Daniel Juncadella	Oreca 07	G	123	+3 Laps
17	LMP2	18	(France) IDEC Sport	(United Kingdom) Jamie Chadwick (France) Mathys Jaubert (Spain) Daniel Juncadella	Gibson GK428 4.2 L V8	G	123	+3 Laps
18	LMP2 Pro-Am	3	(Luxembourg) DKR Engineering	(Germany) Laurents Hörr (Greece) Georgios Kolovos (France) Thomas Laurent	Oreca 07	G	123	+3 Laps
18	LMP2 Pro-Am	3	(Luxembourg) DKR Engineering	(Germany) Laurents Hörr (Greece) Georgios Kolovos (France) Thomas Laurent	Gibson GK428 4.2 L V8	G	123	+3 Laps
19	LMP2	10	(United Kingdom) Vector Sport	(Republic of Ireland) Ryan Cullen (Brazil) Pietro Fittipaldi (France) Vladislav Lomko	Oreca 07	G	122	+4 Laps
19	LMP2	10	(United Kingdom) Vector Sport	(Republic of Ireland) Ryan Cullen (Brazil) Pietro Fittipaldi (France) Vladislav Lomko	Gibson GK428 4.2 L V8	G	122	+4 Laps
20	LMP2 Pro-Am	27	(United Kingdom) Nielsen Racing	(Australia) James Allen (Brazil) Sérgio Sette Câmara (United Kingdom) Anthony Wells	Oreca 07	G	122	+4 Laps
20	LMP2 Pro-Am	27	(United Kingdom) Nielsen Racing	(Australia) James Allen (Brazil) Sérgio Sette Câmara (United Kingdom) Anthony Wells	Gibson GK428 4.2 L V8	G	122	+4 Laps
21	**LMGT3**	**82**	**(United Kingdom) TF Sport**	**(Angola) Rui Andrade (Republic of Ireland) Charlie Eastwood (Japan) Hiroshi Koizumi**	**Chevrolet Corvette Z06 GT3.R**	G	**118**	**+8 Laps‡**
21	**LMGT3**	**82**	**(United Kingdom) TF Sport**	**(Angola) Rui Andrade (Republic of Ireland) Charlie Eastwood (Japan) Hiroshi Koizumi**	**Chevrolet LT6.R 5.5 L V8**	G	**118**	**+8 Laps‡**
22	LMGT3	74	(Switzerland) Kessel Racing	(United Kingdom) Andrew Gilbert (Spain) Miguel Molina (Spain) Fran Rueda	Ferrari 296 GT3	G	118	+8 Laps
22	LMGT3	74	(Switzerland) Kessel Racing	(United Kingdom) Andrew Gilbert (Spain) Miguel Molina (Spain) Fran Rueda	Ferrari F163CE 3.0 L Turbo V6	G	118	+8 Laps
23	LMGT3	55	(Switzerland) Spirit of Race	(United Kingdom) Duncan Cameron (Republic of Ireland) Matt Griffin (South Africa) David Perel	Ferrari 296 GT3	G	118	+8 Laps
23	LMGT3	55	(Switzerland) Spirit of Race	(United Kingdom) Duncan Cameron (Republic of Ireland) Matt Griffin (South Africa) David Perel	Ferrari F163CE 3.0 L Turbo V6	G	118	+8 Laps
24	LMGT3	51	(Italy) AF Corse	(Denmark) Conrad Laursen (Italy) Davide Rigon (France) Charles-Henri Samani	Ferrari 296 GT3	G	118	+8 Laps
24	LMGT3	51	(Italy) AF Corse	(Denmark) Conrad Laursen (Italy) Davide Rigon (France) Charles-Henri Samani	Ferrari F163CE 3.0 L Turbo V6	G	118	+8 Laps
25	LMGT3	60	(Germany) Proton Competition	(Italy) Matteo Cressoni (Belgium) Alessio Picariello (Germany) Christian Ried	Porsche 911 GT3 R (992)	G	118	+8 Laps
25	LMGT3	60	(Germany) Proton Competition	(Italy) Matteo Cressoni (Belgium) Alessio Picariello (Germany) Christian Ried	Porsche M97/80 4.2 L Flat-6	G	118	+8 Laps
26	LMGT3	66	(United Kingdom) JMW Motorsport	(Italy) Gianmaria Bruni (United States) Jason Hart (United States) Scott Noble	Ferrari 296 GT3	G	118	+8 Laps
26	LMGT3	66	(United Kingdom) JMW Motorsport	(Italy) Gianmaria Bruni (United States) Jason Hart (United States) Scott Noble	Ferrari F163CE 3.0 L Turbo V6	G	118	+8 Laps
27	**LMP3**	**17**	**(Switzerland) CLX Motorsport**	**(France) Adrien Closmenil (Denmark) Theodor Jensen (France) Paul Lanchère**	**Ligier JS P325**	M	**118**	**+8 Laps‡**
27	**LMP3**	**17**	**(Switzerland) CLX Motorsport**	**(France) Adrien Closmenil (Denmark) Theodor Jensen (France) Paul Lanchère**	**Toyota V35A-FTS 3.5 L Turbo V6**	M	**118**	**+8 Laps‡**
28	LMP3	31	(France) Racing Spirit of Léman	(France) Marius Fossard (France) Jean-Ludovic Foubert (France) Jacques Wolff	Ligier JS P325	M	116	+10 Laps
28	LMP3	31	(France) Racing Spirit of Léman	(France) Marius Fossard (France) Jean-Ludovic Foubert (France) Jacques Wolff	Toyota V35A-FTS 3.5 L Turbo V6	M	116	+10 Laps
29	LMGT3	59	(France) Racing Spirit of Léman	(France) Erwan Bastard (France) Valentin Hasse-Clot (France) Clément Mateu	Aston Martin Vantage AMR GT3 Evo	G	116	+10 Laps
29	LMGT3	59	(France) Racing Spirit of Léman	(France) Erwan Bastard (France) Valentin Hasse-Clot (France) Clément Mateu	Aston Martin M177 4.0 L Turbo V8	G	116	+10 Laps
30	LMGT3	50	(Italy) Richard Mille AF Corse	(Italy) Riccardo Agostini (Brazil) Custodio Toledo (France) Lilou Wadoux	Ferrari 296 GT3	G	116	+10 Laps
30	LMGT3	50	(Italy) Richard Mille AF Corse	(Italy) Riccardo Agostini (Brazil) Custodio Toledo (France) Lilou Wadoux	Ferrari F163CE 3.0 L Turbo V6	G	116	+10 Laps
31	LMGT3	85	(Italy) Iron Dames	(Belgium) Sarah Bovy (Denmark) Michelle Gatting (France) Célia Martin	Porsche 911 GT3 R (992)	G	116	+10 Laps
31	LMGT3	85	(Italy) Iron Dames	(Belgium) Sarah Bovy (Denmark) Michelle Gatting (France) Célia Martin	Porsche M97/80 4.2 L Flat-6	G	116	+10 Laps
32	LMP3	11	(Italy) EuroInternational	(Mexico) Ian Aguilera (France) Fabien Michal	Ligier JS P325	M	116	+10 Laps
32	LMP3	11	(Italy) EuroInternational	(Mexico) Ian Aguilera (France) Fabien Michal	Toyota V35A-FTS 3.5 L Turbo V6	M	116	+10 Laps
33	LMP3	12	(Germany) WTM by Rinaldi Racing	(Germany) Torsten Kratz (Australia) Griffin Peebles (Germany) Leonard Weiss	Duqueine D09	M	115	+11 Laps
33	LMP3	12	(Germany) WTM by Rinaldi Racing	(Germany) Torsten Kratz (Australia) Griffin Peebles (Germany) Leonard Weiss	Toyota V35A-FTS 3.5 L Turbo V6	M	115	+11 Laps
34	LMP3	8	(Poland) Team Virage	(Netherlands) Rik Koen (Spain) Daniel Nogales (Poland) Jacek Zielonka	Ligier JS P325	M	115	+11 Laps
34	LMP3	8	(Poland) Team Virage	(Netherlands) Rik Koen (Spain) Daniel Nogales (Poland) Jacek Zielonka	Toyota V35A-FTS 3.5 L Turbo V6	M	115	+11 Laps
35	LMGT3	23	(United Kingdom) United Autosports	(United Kingdom) Michael Birch (United Kingdom) Wayne Boyd (Australia) Garnet Patterson	McLaren 720S GT3 Evo	G	114	+12 Laps
35	LMGT3	23	(United Kingdom) United Autosports	(United Kingdom) Michael Birch (United Kingdom) Wayne Boyd (Australia) Garnet Patterson	McLaren M840T 4.0 L Turbo V8	G	114	+12 Laps
36	LMP3	35	(France) Ultimate	(France) Jean-Baptiste Lahaye (France) Matthieu Lahaye (France) Louis Stern	Ligier JS P325	M	113	+13 Laps
36	LMP3	35	(France) Ultimate	(France) Jean-Baptiste Lahaye (France) Matthieu Lahaye (France) Louis Stern	Toyota V35A-FTS 3.5 L Turbo V6	M	113	+13 Laps
37	LMP3	88	(Poland) Inter Europol Competition	(United Kingdom) Tim Creswick (Belgium) Douwe Dedecker (United States) Reece Gold	Ligier JS P325	M	112	+14 Laps
37	LMP3	88	(Poland) Inter Europol Competition	(United Kingdom) Tim Creswick (Belgium) Douwe Dedecker (United States) Reece Gold	Toyota V35A-FTS 3.5 L Turbo V6	M	112	+14 Laps
38	LMP3	4	(Luxembourg) DKR Engineering	(United States) Wyatt Brichacek (Denmark) Mikkel Gaarde Pedersen (Estonia) Antti Rammo	Ginetta G61-LT-P3 Evo	M	101	+25 Laps
38	LMP3	4	(Luxembourg) DKR Engineering	(United States) Wyatt Brichacek (Denmark) Mikkel Gaarde Pedersen (Estonia) Antti Rammo	Toyota V35A-FTS 3.5 L Turbo V6	M	101	+25 Laps
Not classified
	LMP3	68	(France) M Racing	(France) Quentin Antonel (France) Stéphane Tribaudini	Ligier JS P325	M	98	Did not finish
	LMP3	68	(France) M Racing	(France) Quentin Antonel (France) Stéphane Tribaudini	Toyota V35A-FTS 3.5 L Turbo V6	M	98	Did not finish
	LMP3	15	(United Kingdom) RLR MSport	(United Kingdom) Nick Adcock (France) Gillian Henrion (Denmark) Michael Jensen	Ligier JS P325	M	42	Power steering pump
	LMP3	15	(United Kingdom) RLR MSport	(United Kingdom) Nick Adcock (France) Gillian Henrion (Denmark) Michael Jensen	Toyota V35A-FTS 3.5 L Turbo V6	M	42	Power steering pump
	LMP2	28	(France) IDEC Sport	(France) Paul-Loup Chatin (France) Paul Lafargue (Netherlands) Job van Uitert	Oreca 07	G	18	Accident
	LMP2	28	(France) IDEC Sport	(France) Paul-Loup Chatin (France) Paul Lafargue (Netherlands) Job van Uitert	Gibson GK428 4.2 L V8	G	18	Accident
	LMGT3	86	(United Kingdom) GR Racing	(United Kingdom) Tom Fleming (Italy) Riccardo Pera (United Kingdom) Michael Wainwright	Ferrari 296 GT3	G	16	Accident
	LMGT3	86	(United Kingdom) GR Racing	(United Kingdom) Tom Fleming (Italy) Riccardo Pera (United Kingdom) Michael Wainwright	Ferrari F163CE 3.0 L Turbo V6	G	16	Accident
	LMGT3	63	(Italy) Iron Lynx	(Singapore) Martin Berry (United Kingdom) Lorcan Hanafin (Germany) Fabian Schiller	Mercedes-AMG GT3 Evo	G	16	Accident
	LMGT3	63	(Italy) Iron Lynx	(Singapore) Martin Berry (United Kingdom) Lorcan Hanafin (Germany) Fabian Schiller	Mercedes-AMG M159 6.2 L V8	G	16	Accident
	LMGT3	57	(Switzerland) Kessel Racing	(Japan) Takeshi Kimura (Brazil) Daniel Serra (United Kingdom) Ben Tuck	Ferrari 296 GT3	G	16	Accident
	LMGT3	57	(Switzerland) Kessel Racing	(Japan) Takeshi Kimura (Brazil) Daniel Serra (United Kingdom) Ben Tuck	Ferrari F163CE 3.0 L Turbo V6	G	16	Accident

== Notes ==
European Le Mans Series
Previous race: 4 Hours of Le Castellet	2025 season	Next race: 4 Hours of Spa-Francorchamps
