= 2025 4 Hours of Barcelona =

Endurance sportscar racing event

The layout of the Circuit de Barcelona-Catalunya

The 2025 4 Hours of Barcelona was an endurance sportscar racing event, held between 4 and 6 April 2025 at Circuit de Barcelona-Catalunya in Montmeló, Spain. It was the first of six rounds of the 2025 European Le Mans Series season, and the fifth consecutive running of the event as part of the championship. François Perrodo, Alessio Rovera, and Matthieu Vaxivière won the event in the No. 83 AF Corse Oreca.

== Entry list ==
The provisional entry list was published on 21 March 2025 and consists of 44 entries across 4 categories – 13 in LMP2, 8 in LMP2 Pro-Am, 10 in LMP3, and 13 in LMGT3.

== Schedule ==
Date	Time (local: CEST)	Event
Friday, 4 April	11:50	Free Practice 1
Friday, 4 April	16:10	Bronze Driver Collective Test
Saturday, 5 April	10:10	Free Practice 2
Saturday, 5 April	15:05	Qualifying – LMGT3
Saturday, 5 April	15:30	Qualifying – LMP3
Saturday, 5 April	15:55	Qualifying – LMP2 Pro-Am
Saturday, 5 April	16:20	Qualifying – LMP2
Sunday, 6 April	12:00	Race

== Free practice ==
Two practice sessions were held before the event: one on Friday, and one on Saturday. The session on Friday afternoon lasted 90 minutes, and the session on Saturday morning lasted 90 minutes.

=== Practice 1 ===
The first practice session started at 11:50 CEST on Friday and was topped by Tom Dillmann in the No. 43 Inter Europol Competition Oreca, lapping the circuit in 1:29.333. He was 0.406 seconds faster than second-placed Matteo Cairoli in the No. 9 Iron Lynx – Proton Oreca, while Tom Blomqvist placed third in the No. 37 CLX – Pure Rxcing Oreca, 0.679 seconds off the pace. In the LMP2 Pro/Am class, Bent Viscaal set the fastest time with a 1:30.429 in the No. 77 Proton Oreca, ahead of Alex Quinn in the No. 20 Algarve Pro Racing Oreca by 0.266 seconds. Adrien Closmenil led the LMP3 field with a 1:37.536 in the No. 17 CLX Ligier, 0.219 seconds clear of Marius Fossard in the No. 31 Racing Spirit of Léman Ligier. Riccardo Agostini was quickest in the LMGT3 class, posting a 1:40.985 in the No. 50 Richard Mille AF Corse Ferrari. He was followed by Daniel Serra in the No. 57 Kessel Racing Ferrari and Alessio Picariello in the No. 60 Proton Porsche, 0.198 and 0.864 seconds behind Agostini, respectively. The session was interrupted by a single, three-minute red flag period.

Class	No.	Entrant	Driver	Time
LMP2	43	(Poland) Inter Europol Competition	(France) Tom Dillmann	1:29.333
LMP2 Pro-Am	77	(Germany) Proton Competition	(Netherlands) Bent Viscaal	1:30.429
LMP3	17	(Switzerland) CLX Motorsport	(France) Adrien Closmenil	1:37.536
LMGT3	50	(Italy) Richard Mille AF Corse	(Italy) Riccardo Agostini	1:40.985

- Note: Only the fastest car in each class is shown.

=== Practice 2 ===
The second practice session started at 10:10 CEST on Saturday. The session was topped by Dillmann in the No. 43 Oreca, with a lap time of 1:28.741. His lap was 0.293 seconds faster than that of teammate Luca Ghiotto in the No. 34 Oreca. Blomqvist rounded out the top three in the No. 37 Oreca, 0.654 seconds behind the leader. Quinn topped the LMP2 Pro-Am class in the No. 20 Oreca, with a lap time of 1:29.684. Quentin Antonel led the LMP3 class in the No. 68 M Racing Ligier, lapping the circuit in 1 minute, 38.446 seconds. He was 0.415 seconds quicker than second-placed Matthieu Lahaye in the No. 35 Ultimate Ligier. The No. 74 Kessel Racing Ferrari led the LMGT3 class in the hands of Miguel Molina, with a lap time of 1:41.350. Molina's lap was 0.065 seconds quicker than that of second-placed Lilou Wadoux in the No. 50 Ferrari. Davide Rigon rounded out the top three in a third Ferrari (No. 51 AF Corse), 0.603 seconds behind Molina. The session saw one red flag stoppage after the No. 99 AO by TF Oreca had an accident.

Class	No.	Entrant	Driver	Time
LMP2	43	(Poland) Inter Europol Competition	(France) Tom Dillmann	1:28.741
LMP2 Pro-Am	20	(Portugal) Algarve Pro Racing	(United Kingdom) Alex Quinn	1:29.684
LMP3	68	(France) M Racing	(France) Quentin Antonel	1:38.446
LMGT3	74	(Switzerland) Kessel Racing	(Spain) Miguel Molina	1:41.350

- Note: Only the fastest car in each class is shown.

== Qualifying ==
Qualifying started at 15:05 CEST, with four sessions of fifteen minutes each, one session for each class. Reshad de Gerus claimed pole position in the No. 30 Duqueine Team Oreca.

=== Qualifying results ===
Pole position winners in each class are marked in bold.

Pos	Class	No.	Team	Driver	Time	Gap	Grid
1	**LMP2**	**30**	**(France) Duqueine Team**	**(France) Reshad de Gerus**	**1:27.664**	—	1
2	LMP2	9	(Germany) Iron Lynx – Proton	(Italy) Matteo Cairoli	1:27.830	+0.166	2
3	LMP2	43	(Poland) Inter Europol Competition	(France) Tom Dillmann	1:27.883	+0.219	3
4	LMP2	37	(Lithuania) CLX – Pure Rxcing	(United Kingdom) Tom Blomqvist	1:28.117	+0.453	4
5	LMP2	18	(France) IDEC Sport	(France) Mathys Jaubert	1:28.309	+0.645	5
6	LMP2	48	(France) VDS Panis Racing	(France) Charles Milesi	1:28.454	+0.790	6
7	LMP2	25	(Portugal) Algarve Pro Racing	(France) Théo Pourchaire	1:28.595	+0.931	7
8	LMP2	47	(Switzerland) CLX Motorsport	(Portugal) Manuel Espírito Santo	1:28.636	+0.972	8
9	LMP2	34	(Poland) Inter Europol Competition	(Italy) Luca Ghiotto	1:28.667	+1.003	9
10	LMP2	28	(France) IDEC Sport	(Netherlands) Job van Uitert	1:28.875	+1.211	10
11	LMP2	22	(United Kingdom) United Autosports	(Switzerland) Grégoire Saucy	1:28.958	+1.294	11
12	LMP2	10	(United Kingdom) Vector Sport	(Brazil) Pietro Fittipaldi	1:29.032	+1.368	12
13	LMP2	24	(United Kingdom) Nielsen Racing	(Portugal) Filipe Albuquerque	1:29.843	+2.179	13
14	**LMP2 Pro-Am**	**77**	**(Germany) Proton Competition**	**(Italy) Giorgio Roda**	**1:31.110**	**+3.446**	14
15	LMP2 Pro-Am	99	(United States) AO by TF	(United States) P. J. Hyett	1:31.349	+3.685	15
16	LMP2 Pro-Am	29	(France) TDS Racing	(United States) Rodrigo Sales	1:31.923	+4.259	16
17	LMP2 Pro-Am	83	(Italy) AF Corse	(France) François Perrodo	1:33.303	+5.639	17
18	LMP2 Pro-Am	21	(United Kingdom) United Autosports	(Brazil) Daniel Schneider	1:33.524	+5.860	18
19	LMP2 Pro-Am	27	(United Kingdom) Nielsen Racing	(United Kingdom) Anthony Wells	1:33.781	+6.117	19
20	LMP2 Pro-Am	20	(Portugal) Algarve Pro Racing	(Greece) Kriton Lendoudis	1:35.755	+8.091	20
21	**LMP3**	**17**	**(Switzerland) CLX Motorsport**	**(France) Adrien Closmenil**	**1:36.188**	**+8.524**	22
22	LMP3	8	(Poland) Team Virage	(Netherlands) Rik Koen	1:36.425	+8.761	23
23	LMP3	11	(Italy) EuroInternational	(Mexico) Ian Aguilera	1:36.440	+8.776	24
24	LMP3	35	(France) Ultimate	(France) Jean-Baptiste Lahaye	1:36.485	+8.821	25
25	LMP3	12	(Germany) WTM by Rinaldi Racing	(Australia) Griffin Peebles	1:36.612	+8.948	26
26	LMP3	31	(France) Racing Spirit of Léman	(France) Marius Fossard	1:36.687	+9.023	27
27	LMP3	68	(France) M Racing	(France) Quentin Antonel	1:36.767	+9.103	28
28	LMP3	15	(United Kingdom) RLR MSport	(France) Gillian Henrion	1:37.037	+9.373	29
29	LMP3	88	(Poland) Inter Europol Competition	(Belgium) Douwe Dedecker	1:37.145	+9.481	30
30	LMP3	4	(Luxembourg) DKR Engineering	(United States) Wyatt Brichacek	1:37.162	+9.498	31
31	**LMGT3**	**63**	**(Italy) Iron Lynx**	**(Singapore) Martin Berry**	**1:42.257**	**+14.593**	32
32	LMGT3	85	(Italy) Iron Dames	(France) Célia Martin	1:42.444	+14.780	33
33	LMGT3	59	(France) Racing Spirit of Léman	(France) Clément Mateu	1:42.870	+15.206	34
34	LMGT3	50	(Italy) Richard Mille AF Corse	(Brazil) Custodio Toledo	1:42.958	+15.294	35
35	LMGT3	74	(Switzerland) Kessel Racing	(United Kingdom) Andrew Gilbert	1:43.096	+15.432	36
36	LMGT3	57	(Switzerland) Kessel Racing	(Japan) Takeshi Kimura	1:43.419	+15.755	37
37	LMGT3	55	(Switzerland) Spirit of Race	(United Kingdom) Duncan Cameron	1:43.439	+15.775	38
38	LMGT3	66	(United Kingdom) JMW Motorsport	(United States) Scott Noble	1:43.961	+16.297	39
39	LMGT3	23	(United Kingdom) United Autosports	(United Kingdom) Michael Birch	1:43.976	+16.312	40
40	LMGT3	86	(United Kingdom) GR Racing	(United Kingdom) Michael Wainwright	1:44.399	+16.735	41
41	LMGT3	51	(Italy) AF Corse	(France) Charles-Henri Samani	1:44.521	+16.857	42
42	LMGT3	82	(United Kingdom) TF Sport	(Japan) Hiroshi Koizumi	1:44.529	+16.865	43
43	LMGT3	60	(Germany) Proton Competition	(Italy) Claudio Schiavoni	1:44.827	+17.163	44
44	LMP2 Pro-Am	3	(Luxembourg) DKR Engineering	(Greece) Georgios Kolovos	No time set (Note: The No. 3 DKR Engineering Oreca had all its lap times deleted due to causing a red flag. Per ELMS regulations, the car started from the back of the LMP2 Pro-Am class.)		21

== Race ==
The race started at 12:00 CEST, and ran for 4 hours. François Perrodo, Alessio Rovera, and Matthieu Vaxivière won the race in the No. 83 AF Corse Oreca after a last lap pass on the No. 18 IDEC Sport Oreca of Jamie Chadwick, Mathys Jaubert, and Daniel Juncadella.

=== Race results ===
The minimum number of laps for classification (70% of overall winning car's distance) was 91 laps. Class winners are in bold and ‡.

Pos	Class	No	Team	Drivers	Chassis	Tyre	Laps	Time/Retired
Pos	Class	No	Team	Drivers	Engine	Tyre	Laps	Time/Retired
1	**LMP2 Pro-Am**	**83**	**(Italy) AF Corse**	**(France) François Perrodo (Italy) Alessio Rovera (France) Matthieu Vaxivière**	**Oreca 07**	G	**130**	**4:00:52.521‡**
1	**LMP2 Pro-Am**	**83**	**(Italy) AF Corse**	**(France) François Perrodo (Italy) Alessio Rovera (France) Matthieu Vaxivière**	**Gibson GK428 4.2 L V8**	G	**130**	**4:00:52.521‡**
2	**LMP2**	**18**	**(France) IDEC Sport**	**(United Kingdom) Jamie Chadwick (France) Mathys Jaubert (Spain) Daniel Juncadella**	**Oreca 07**	G	**130**	**+1.187‡**
2	**LMP2**	**18**	**(France) IDEC Sport**	**(United Kingdom) Jamie Chadwick (France) Mathys Jaubert (Spain) Daniel Juncadella**	**Gibson GK428 4.2 L V8**	G	**130**	**+1.187‡**
3	LMP2	48	(France) VDS Panis Racing	(United Kingdom) Oliver Gray (France) Esteban Masson (France) Charles Milesi	Oreca 07	G	130	+2.472
3	LMP2	48	(France) VDS Panis Racing	(United Kingdom) Oliver Gray (France) Esteban Masson (France) Charles Milesi	Gibson GK428 4.2 L V8	G	130	+2.472
4	LMP2	10	(United Kingdom) Vector Sport	(Republic of Ireland) Ryan Cullen (Brazil) Pietro Fittipaldi (France) Vladislav Lomko	Oreca 07	G	130	+3.055
4	LMP2	10	(United Kingdom) Vector Sport	(Republic of Ireland) Ryan Cullen (Brazil) Pietro Fittipaldi (France) Vladislav Lomko	Gibson GK428 4.2 L V8	G	130	+3.055
5	LMP2	37	(Lithuania) CLX – Pure Rxcing	(United Kingdom) Tom Blomqvist (United Kingdom) Alex Malykhin (France) Tristan Vautier	Oreca 07	G	130	+3.462
5	LMP2	37	(Lithuania) CLX – Pure Rxcing	(United Kingdom) Tom Blomqvist (United Kingdom) Alex Malykhin (France) Tristan Vautier	Gibson GK428 4.2 L V8	G	130	+3.462
6	LMP2	25	(Portugal) Algarve Pro Racing	(Spain) Lorenzo Fluxá (Liechtenstein) Matthias Kaiser (France) Théo Pourchaire	Oreca 07	G	130	+4.266
6	LMP2	25	(Portugal) Algarve Pro Racing	(Spain) Lorenzo Fluxá (Liechtenstein) Matthias Kaiser (France) Théo Pourchaire	Gibson GK428 4.2 L V8	G	130	+4.266
7	LMP2 Pro-Am	20	(Portugal) Algarve Pro Racing	(United Kingdom) Olli Caldwell (Greece) Kriton Lendoudis (United Kingdom) Alex Quinn	Oreca 07	G	130	+6.329
7	LMP2 Pro-Am	20	(Portugal) Algarve Pro Racing	(United Kingdom) Olli Caldwell (Greece) Kriton Lendoudis (United Kingdom) Alex Quinn	Gibson GK428 4.2 L V8	G	130	+6.329
8	LMP2	22	(United Kingdom) United Autosports	(United Kingdom) Ben Hanley (Venezuela) Manuel Maldonado (Switzerland) Grégoire Saucy	Oreca 07	G	130	+11.388
8	LMP2	22	(United Kingdom) United Autosports	(United Kingdom) Ben Hanley (Venezuela) Manuel Maldonado (Switzerland) Grégoire Saucy	Gibson GK428 4.2 L V8	G	130	+11.388
9	LMP2	24	(United Kingdom) Nielsen Racing	(Portugal) Filipe Albuquerque (Australia) James Allen (Turkey) Cem Bölükbaşı	Oreca 07	G	130	+11.996
9	LMP2	24	(United Kingdom) Nielsen Racing	(Portugal) Filipe Albuquerque (Australia) James Allen (Turkey) Cem Bölükbaşı	Gibson GK428 4.2 L V8	G	130	+11.996
10	LMP2 Pro-Am	29	(France) TDS Racing	(Switzerland) Mathias Beche (France) Clément Novalak (United States) Rodrigo Sales	Oreca 07	G	130	+15.710
10	LMP2 Pro-Am	29	(France) TDS Racing	(Switzerland) Mathias Beche (France) Clément Novalak (United States) Rodrigo Sales	Gibson GK428 4.2 L V8	G	130	+15.710
11	LMP2 Pro-Am	77	(Germany) Proton Competition	(Austria) René Binder (Italy) Giorgio Roda (Netherlands) Bent Viscaal	Oreca 07	G	130	+16.696
11	LMP2 Pro-Am	77	(Germany) Proton Competition	(Austria) René Binder (Italy) Giorgio Roda (Netherlands) Bent Viscaal	Gibson GK428 4.2 L V8	G	130	+16.696
12	LMP2 Pro-Am	21	(United Kingdom) United Autosports	(United Kingdom) Oliver Jarvis (Japan) Marino Sato (Brazil) Daniel Schneider	Oreca 07	G	130	+18.778
12	LMP2 Pro-Am	21	(United Kingdom) United Autosports	(United Kingdom) Oliver Jarvis (Japan) Marino Sato (Brazil) Daniel Schneider	Gibson GK428 4.2 L V8	G	130	+18.778
13	LMP2	28	(France) IDEC Sport	(France) Paul-Loup Chatin (France) Paul Lafargue (Netherlands) Job van Uitert	Oreca 07	G	129	+1 Lap
13	LMP2	28	(France) IDEC Sport	(France) Paul-Loup Chatin (France) Paul Lafargue (Netherlands) Job van Uitert	Gibson GK428 4.2 L V8	G	129	+1 Lap
14	LMP2 Pro-Am	3	(Luxembourg) DKR Engineering	(Germany) Laurents Hörr (Greece) Georgios Kolovos (France) Thomas Laurent	Oreca 07	G	129	+1 Lap
14	LMP2 Pro-Am	3	(Luxembourg) DKR Engineering	(Germany) Laurents Hörr (Greece) Georgios Kolovos (France) Thomas Laurent	Gibson GK428 4.2 L V8	G	129	+1 Lap
15	LMP2 Pro-Am	27	(United Kingdom) Nielsen Racing	(Austria) Ferdinand Habsburg (Brazil) Sérgio Sette Câmara (United Kingdom) Anthony Wells	Oreca 07	G	129	+1 Lap
15	LMP2 Pro-Am	27	(United Kingdom) Nielsen Racing	(Austria) Ferdinand Habsburg (Brazil) Sérgio Sette Câmara (United Kingdom) Anthony Wells	Gibson GK428 4.2 L V8	G	129	+1 Lap
16	LMP2	34	(Poland) Inter Europol Competition	(Italy) Luca Ghiotto (Mozambique) Pedro Perino (France) Jean-Baptiste Simmenauer	Oreca 07	G	128	+2 Laps
16	LMP2	34	(Poland) Inter Europol Competition	(Italy) Luca Ghiotto (Mozambique) Pedro Perino (France) Jean-Baptiste Simmenauer	Gibson GK428 4.2 L V8	G	128	+2 Laps
17	**LMP3**	**17**	**(Switzerland) CLX Motorsport**	**(France) Adrien Closmenil (Denmark) Theodor Jensen (France) Paul Lanchère**	**Ligier JS P325**	MI	**124**	**+6 Laps‡**
17	**LMP3**	**17**	**(Switzerland) CLX Motorsport**	**(France) Adrien Closmenil (Denmark) Theodor Jensen (France) Paul Lanchère**	**Toyota V35A-FTS 3.5 L Turbo V6**	MI	**124**	**+6 Laps‡**
18	LMP3	15	(United Kingdom) RLR MSport	(United Kingdom) Nick Adcock (France) Gillian Henrion (Denmark) Michael Jensen	Ligier JS P325	MI	124	+6 Laps
18	LMP3	15	(United Kingdom) RLR MSport	(United Kingdom) Nick Adcock (France) Gillian Henrion (Denmark) Michael Jensen	Toyota V35A-FTS 3.5 L Turbo V6	MI	124	+6 Laps
19	LMP3	88	(Poland) Inter Europol Competition	(United Kingdom) Tim Creswick (Belgium) Douwe Dedecker (United States) Reece Gold	Ligier JS P325	MI	124	+6 Laps (Note: The No. 88 Inter Europol Competition Ligier received a 5-second penalty for failing to reduce speed under virtual safety car procedure.)
19	LMP3	88	(Poland) Inter Europol Competition	(United Kingdom) Tim Creswick (Belgium) Douwe Dedecker (United States) Reece Gold	Toyota V35A-FTS 3.5 L Turbo V6	MI	124	+6 Laps
20	LMP2 Pro-Am	99	(United States) AO by TF	(United States) Dane Cameron (Switzerland) Louis Delétraz (United States) P. J. Hyett	Oreca 07	G	124	+6 Laps
20	LMP2 Pro-Am	99	(United States) AO by TF	(United States) Dane Cameron (Switzerland) Louis Delétraz (United States) P. J. Hyett	Gibson GK428 4.2 L V8	G	124	+6 Laps
21	LMP3	68	(France) M Racing	(France) Quentin Antonel (France) Stéphane Tribaudini	Ligier JS P325	MI	124	+6 Laps
21	LMP3	68	(France) M Racing	(France) Quentin Antonel (France) Stéphane Tribaudini	Toyota V35A-FTS 3.5 L Turbo V6	MI	124	+6 Laps
22	LMP3	35	(France) Ultimate	(France) Jean-Baptiste Lahaye (France) Matthieu Lahaye (France) Louis Rossi	Ligier JS P325	MI	124	+6 Laps
22	LMP3	35	(France) Ultimate	(France) Jean-Baptiste Lahaye (France) Matthieu Lahaye (France) Louis Rossi	Toyota V35A-FTS 3.5 L Turbo V6	MI	124	+6 Laps
23	LMP2	43	(Poland) Inter Europol Competition	(France) Tom Dillmann (Poland) Jakub Śmiechowski (United Kingdom) Nick Yelloly	Oreca 07	G	122	+8 Laps
23	LMP2	43	(Poland) Inter Europol Competition	(France) Tom Dillmann (Poland) Jakub Śmiechowski (United Kingdom) Nick Yelloly	Gibson GK428 4.2 L V8	G	122	+8 Laps
24	LMP3	12	(Germany) WTM by Rinaldi Racing	(Germany) Torsten Kratz (Australia) Griffin Peebles (Germany) Leonard Weiss	Duqueine D09	MI	122	+8 Laps
24	LMP3	12	(Germany) WTM by Rinaldi Racing	(Germany) Torsten Kratz (Australia) Griffin Peebles (Germany) Leonard Weiss	Toyota V35A-FTS 3.5 L Turbo V6	MI	122	+8 Laps
25	**LMGT3**	**85**	**(Italy) Iron Dames**	**(Belgium) Sarah Bovy (Denmark) Michelle Gatting (France) Célia Martin**	**Porsche 911 GT3 R (992)**	G	**121**	**+9 Laps‡**
25	**LMGT3**	**85**	**(Italy) Iron Dames**	**(Belgium) Sarah Bovy (Denmark) Michelle Gatting (France) Célia Martin**	**Porsche M97/80 4.2 L Flat-6**	G	**121**	**+9 Laps‡**
26	LMGT3	57	(Switzerland) Kessel Racing	(Japan) Takeshi Kimura (Brazil) Daniel Serra (United Kingdom) Ben Tuck	Ferrari 296 GT3	G	121	+9 Laps
26	LMGT3	57	(Switzerland) Kessel Racing	(Japan) Takeshi Kimura (Brazil) Daniel Serra (United Kingdom) Ben Tuck	Ferrari F163CE 3.0 L Turbo V6	G	121	+9 Laps
27	LMGT3	60	(Germany) Proton Competition	(Italy) Matteo Cressoni (Belgium) Alessio Picariello (Italy) Claudio Schiavoni	Porsche 911 GT3 R (992)	G	121	+9 Laps
27	LMGT3	60	(Germany) Proton Competition	(Italy) Matteo Cressoni (Belgium) Alessio Picariello (Italy) Claudio Schiavoni	Porsche M97/80 4.2 L Flat-6	G	121	+9 Laps
28	LMGT3	55	(Switzerland) Spirit of Race	(United Kingdom) Duncan Cameron (Republic of Ireland) Matt Griffin (South Africa) David Perel	Ferrari 296 GT3	G	121	+9 Laps
28	LMGT3	55	(Switzerland) Spirit of Race	(United Kingdom) Duncan Cameron (Republic of Ireland) Matt Griffin (South Africa) David Perel	Ferrari F163CE 3.0 L Turbo V6	G	121	+9 Laps
29	LMGT3	51	(Italy) AF Corse	(Denmark) Conrad Laursen (Italy) Davide Rigon (France) Charles-Henri Samani	Ferrari 296 GT3	G	121	+9 Laps
29	LMGT3	51	(Italy) AF Corse	(Denmark) Conrad Laursen (Italy) Davide Rigon (France) Charles-Henri Samani	Ferrari F163CE 3.0 L Turbo V6	G	121	+9 Laps
30	LMGT3	82	(United Kingdom) TF Sport	(Angola) Rui Andrade (Republic of Ireland) Charlie Eastwood (Japan) Hiroshi Koizumi	Chevrolet Corvette Z06 GT3.R	G	121	+9 Laps
30	LMGT3	82	(United Kingdom) TF Sport	(Angola) Rui Andrade (Republic of Ireland) Charlie Eastwood (Japan) Hiroshi Koizumi	Chevrolet LT6.R 5.5 L V8	G	121	+9 Laps
31	LMGT3	59	(France) Racing Spirit of Léman	(France) Erwan Bastard (France) Valentin Hasse-Clot (France) Clément Mateu	Aston Martin Vantage AMR GT3 Evo	G	121	+9 Laps
31	LMGT3	59	(France) Racing Spirit of Léman	(France) Erwan Bastard (France) Valentin Hasse-Clot (France) Clément Mateu	Aston Martin M177 4.0 L Turbo V8	G	121	+9 Laps
32	LMGT3	86	(United Kingdom) GR Racing	(United Kingdom) Tom Fleming (Italy) Riccardo Pera (United Kingdom) Michael Wainwright	Ferrari 296 GT3	G	121	+9 Laps
32	LMGT3	86	(United Kingdom) GR Racing	(United Kingdom) Tom Fleming (Italy) Riccardo Pera (United Kingdom) Michael Wainwright	Ferrari F163CE 3.0 L Turbo V6	G	121	+9 Laps
33	LMGT3	50	(Italy) Richard Mille AF Corse	(Italy) Riccardo Agostini (Brazil) Custodio Toledo (France) Lilou Wadoux	Ferrari 296 GT3	G	121	+9 Laps (Note: The No. 50 Richard Mille AF Corse Ferrari received a 5-second penalty for failing to reduce speed under virtual safety car procedure. As a result, the car dropped from 6th to 9th in its class.)
33	LMGT3	50	(Italy) Richard Mille AF Corse	(Italy) Riccardo Agostini (Brazil) Custodio Toledo (France) Lilou Wadoux	Ferrari F163CE 3.0 L Turbo V6	G	121	+9 Laps
34	LMGT3	74	(Switzerland) Kessel Racing	(United Kingdom) Andrew Gilbert (Spain) Miguel Molina (Spain) Fran Rueda	Ferrari 296 GT3	G	120	+10 Laps
34	LMGT3	74	(Switzerland) Kessel Racing	(United Kingdom) Andrew Gilbert (Spain) Miguel Molina (Spain) Fran Rueda	Ferrari F163CE 3.0 L Turbo V6	G	120	+10 Laps
35	LMGT3	23	(United Kingdom) United Autosports	(United Kingdom) Michael Birch (United Kingdom) Wayne Boyd (Australia) Garnet Patterson	McLaren 720S GT3 Evo	G	120	+10 Laps
35	LMGT3	23	(United Kingdom) United Autosports	(United Kingdom) Michael Birch (United Kingdom) Wayne Boyd (Australia) Garnet Patterson	McLaren M840T 4.0 L Turbo V8	G	120	+10 Laps
36	LMGT3	66	(United Kingdom) JMW Motorsport	(Italy) Gianmaria Bruni (United States) Jason Hart (United States) Scott Noble	Ferrari 296 GT3	G	120	+10 Laps
36	LMGT3	66	(United Kingdom) JMW Motorsport	(Italy) Gianmaria Bruni (United States) Jason Hart (United States) Scott Noble	Ferrari F163CE 3.0 L Turbo V6	G	120	+10 Laps
37	LMP3	31	(France) Racing Spirit of Léman	(France) Marius Fossard (France) Jean-Ludovic Foubert (France) Jacques Wolff	Ligier JS P325	MI	113	+17 Laps
37	LMP3	31	(France) Racing Spirit of Léman	(France) Marius Fossard (France) Jean-Ludovic Foubert (France) Jacques Wolff	Toyota V35A-FTS 3.5 L Turbo V6	MI	113	+17 Laps
38	LMP3	8	(Poland) Team Virage	(Netherlands) Rik Koen (Spain) Daniel Nogales (Poland) Jacek Zielonka	Ligier JS P325	MI	111	+19 Laps
38	LMP3	8	(Poland) Team Virage	(Netherlands) Rik Koen (Spain) Daniel Nogales (Poland) Jacek Zielonka	Toyota V35A-FTS 3.5 L Turbo V6	MI	111	+19 Laps
39	LMP2	9	(Germany) Iron Lynx – Proton	(Italy) Matteo Cairoli (France) Macéo Capietto (Germany) Jonas Ried	Oreca 07	G	110	+20 Laps
39	LMP2	9	(Germany) Iron Lynx – Proton	(Italy) Matteo Cairoli (France) Macéo Capietto (Germany) Jonas Ried	Gibson GK428 4.2 L V8	G	110	+20 Laps
Not classified
	LMP2	47	(Switzerland) CLX Motorsport	(Brazil) Pipo Derani (Portugal) Manuel Espírito Santo (Brazil) Enzo Fittipaldi	Oreca 07	G	120	Mechanical
	LMP2	47	(Switzerland) CLX Motorsport	(Brazil) Pipo Derani (Portugal) Manuel Espírito Santo (Brazil) Enzo Fittipaldi	Gibson GK428 4.2 L V8	G	120	Mechanical
	LMP3	4	(Luxembourg) DKR Engineering	(United States) Wyatt Brichacek (Denmark) Mikkel Gaarde Pedersen (Estonia) Antti Rammo	Ginetta G61-LT-P3 Evo	MI	114	Did not finish
	LMP3	4	(Luxembourg) DKR Engineering	(United States) Wyatt Brichacek (Denmark) Mikkel Gaarde Pedersen (Estonia) Antti Rammo	Toyota V35A-FTS 3.5 L Turbo V6	MI	114	Did not finish
	LMP2	30	(France) Duqueine Team	(France) Reshad de Gerus (Israel) Roy Nissany (Italy) Francesco Simonazzi	Oreca 07	G	111	Did not finish (Note: The No. 30 Duqueine Team Oreca received a 1-lap deduction and an additional 12.317-second time penalty after speeding in the pit lane.)
	LMP2	30	(France) Duqueine Team	(France) Reshad de Gerus (Israel) Roy Nissany (Italy) Francesco Simonazzi	Gibson GK428 4.2 L V8	G	111	Did not finish
	LMP3	11	(Italy) EuroInternational	(Mexico) Ian Aguilera (Denmark) Sebastian Gravlund (France) Fabien Michal	Ligier JS P325	MI	101	Did not finish (Note: The No. 11 EuroInternational Ligier received a 5-second penalty for failing to reduce speed under virtual safety car procedure.)
	LMP3	11	(Italy) EuroInternational	(Mexico) Ian Aguilera (Denmark) Sebastian Gravlund (France) Fabien Michal	Toyota V35A-FTS 3.5 L Turbo V6	MI	101	Did not finish
	LMGT3	63	(Italy) Iron Lynx	(Singapore) Martin Berry (United Kingdom) Lorcan Hanafin (Germany) Fabian Schiller	Mercedes-AMG GT3 Evo	G	93	Did not finish
	LMGT3	63	(Italy) Iron Lynx	(Singapore) Martin Berry (United Kingdom) Lorcan Hanafin (Germany) Fabian Schiller	Mercedes-AMG M159 6.2 L V8	G	93	Did not finish

=== Statistics ===
==== Fastest lap ====
Class	No.	Entrant	Driver	Time	Lap
LMP2	34	(Poland) Inter Europol Competition	(Italy) Luca Ghiotto	1:32.082	97
LMP2 Pro-Am	20	(Portugal) Algarve Pro Racing	(United Kingdom) Alex Quinn	1:32.389	100
LMP3	11	(Italy) EuroInternational	(Mexico) Ian Aguilera	1:39.812	97
LMGT3	57	(Switzerland) Kessel Racing	(United Kingdom) Ben Tuck	1:42.715	68

== Notes ==
=== Race ===
European Le Mans Series
Previous race: None	2025 season	Next race: 4 Hours of Le Castellet
