= 2023 GT Cup Open Europe =

The 2023 GT Cup Open Europe was the fifth season of the GT Cup Open Europe, the grand tourer-style sports car racing series founded by the Spanish GT Sport Organización. It began on 30 April at the Algarve International Circuit and ended on 22 October at the Circuit de Barcelona-Catalunya after five meetings.

== Race calendar ==
Round		Circuit	Date
1	R1	(Portugal) Algarve International Circuit	29–30 April
1	R2	(Portugal) Algarve International Circuit	29–30 April
2 (Note: Joint endurance race with International GT Open)		(Belgium) Circuit de Spa-Francorchamps	26–28 May
3	R1	(France) Circuit Paul Ricard	22–23 July
3	R2	(France) Circuit Paul Ricard	22–23 July
4	R1	(Italy) Autodromo Nazionale di Monza	23–24 September
4	R2	(Italy) Autodromo Nazionale di Monza	23–24 September
5	R1	(Spain) Circuit de Barcelona-Catalunya	21–22 October
5	R2	(Spain) Circuit de Barcelona-Catalunya	21–22 October

== Entry list ==
Team	Car	No.	Drivers	Class	Rounds
(Belgium) Street-Art Racing	Aston Martin Vantage AMR GT4	007	(France) Julien Darras	T	1, 3
(Belgium) Street-Art Racing	Aston Martin Vantage AMR GT4	007	(France) Jayan Fazal-Karim	T	1, 3
(Italy) Oregon Team	Lamborghini Huracán Super Trofeo Evo2	10	(Italy) Enrico Bettera (Note: Drivers who started their first race of the season at the final round are ineligible for points and invisible as far as awarding points to other drivers.)	Am	5
(Italy) Oregon Team	Lamborghini Huracán Super Trofeo Evo2	10	(Italy) Marzio Moretti	Am	5
(Italy) Fabio Fabiani / SP Racing	Porsche 991 GT3 II Cup	11 (Note: Entered as No. 111 in Round 2 at Spa due to numbering conflict with International GT Open entry for joint endurance race and Kessel Racing's own No. 111 not entering)	(Italy) Fabio Fabiani	Am	All
(Italy) Fabio Fabiani / SP Racing	Porsche 991 GT3 II Cup	11	(Italy) Stefano Zerbi	Am	All
(Italy) Eugenio Pisani / SP Racing	Porsche 991 GT3 II Cup	44	(Italy) Eugenio Pisani	PA	All
(Italy) Eugenio Pisani / SP Racing	Porsche 991 GT3 II Cup	44	(Monaco) Stefano Zanini	PA	All
(Italy) Ghinzani Arco Motorsport	Porsche 992 GT3 Cup	12	(Italy) Glauco Solieri	Am	1
(Italy) Ghinzani Arco Motorsport	Porsche 992 GT3 Cup	14	(Italy) Maurizio Fondi	Am	3–4
(Italy) Ghinzani Arco Motorsport	Porsche 992 GT3 Cup	14	(Netherlands) Laura van den Hengel	Am	3–4
(San Marino) GDL Racing	Porsche 992 GT3 Cup	12	(Italy) Glauco Solieri	Am	5
(San Marino) GDL Racing	Porsche 992 GT3 Cup	64	(Italy) Glauco Solieri	Am	4
(San Marino) GDL Racing	Porsche 992 GT3 Cup	65	(Italy) Mario Cordoni	Am	3
(San Marino) GDL Racing	Porsche 992 GT3 Cup	66 (Note: Entered as No. 166 in Round 2 at Spa due to numbering conflict with International GT Open entry for joint endurance race)	(Italy) Roberto Fecchio	PA	2
(San Marino) GDL Racing	Porsche 992 GT3 Cup	66	(Finland) Juuso Puhakka	PA	2
(San Marino) GDL Racing	Porsche 992 GT3 Cup	66	(Italy) Roberto Fecchio	Am	5
(San Marino) GDL Racing	Porsche 992 GT3 Cup	67	(Italy) Stefano Borghi	Am	1–4
(San Marino) GDL Racing	Porsche 992 GT3 Cup	67	(Italy) Gianluca de Lorenzi	Am	1–3
(San Marino) GDL Racing	Porsche 992 GT3 Cup	67	(Italy) Federico Lamperti	Am	4
(San Marino) GDL Racing	Porsche 992 GT3 Cup	68	(Italy) Samuele Bosio	Am	2–4
(San Marino) GDL Racing	Porsche 992 GT3 Cup	68	(Italy) Glauco Solieri	Am	2
(San Marino) GDL Racing	Porsche 991 GT3 II Cup	70	(Italy) Roberto Bosio	Am	2–4
(San Marino) GDL Racing	Porsche 991 GT3 II Cup	70	(Italy) Maurizio Fondi	Am	2
(San Marino) GDL Racing	Porsche 991 GT3 II Cup	71	(United States) Jim Michaelian	Am	4
(Portugal) Paulo Pinheiro	Porsche 992 GT3 Cup	15	(Portugal) Pedro Marreiros	Am	1
(Portugal) Paulo Pinheiro	Porsche 992 GT3 Cup	15	(Portugal) Paulo Pinheiro	Am	1
(Spain) NM Racing Team	Mercedes-AMG GT2	15	(Spain) Lluc Ibáñez	PA	5
(Spain) NM Racing Team	Mercedes-AMG GT2	15	(Germany) Jörg Viebahn	PA	5
(Spain) Volcano Motorsport	Porsche 992 GT3 Cup	16 (Note: Entered as No. 116 in Round 2 at Spa due to numbering conflict with International GT Open entry for joint endurance race)	Evgenii Leonov (Note: Leonov is Russian, but he competes as neutral competitors as Russian national emblems were banned by the FIA following the Russian invasion of Ukraine.)	PA	All
(Spain) Volcano Motorsport	Porsche 992 GT3 Cup	16	(United Kingdom) Adam Christodoulou	PA	2
(Italy) Rossocorsa Racing	Ferrari 488 Challenge Evo	17	(Italy) Andrea Belicchi	PA	3–5
(Italy) Rossocorsa Racing	Ferrari 488 Challenge Evo	17	(Italy) Lorenzo Ferdinando Innocenti	PA	3–5
(Germany) Mertel Motorsport	Ferrari 488 Challenge Evo	19 (Note: Entered as No. 119 in Round 2 at Spa due to numbering conflict with International GT Open entry for joint endurance race)	(Italy) Stefano Bozzoni	Am	All
(Germany) Mertel Motorsport	Ferrari 488 Challenge Evo	19	(Spain) Fernando Navarrete	Am	All
(Germany) Mertel Motorsport	Ferrari 488 Challenge Evo	80	(Spain) Jorge Cabezas	PA	All
(Germany) Mertel Motorsport	Ferrari 488 Challenge Evo	80	(Spain) Iván Velasco	PA	All
(Germany) Mertel Motorsport	Ferrari 488 Challenge Evo	81	(Germany) Luca Ludwig	PA	2–5
(Germany) Mertel Motorsport	Ferrari 488 Challenge Evo	81	(Germany) Axel Sartingen	PA	2
(Germany) Mertel Motorsport	Ferrari 488 Challenge Evo	81	(United Kingdom) Stephen Liquorish	PA	3–5
(Romania) RO1 Racing by Varu Nicu	Porsche 991 GT3 II Cup	21	(Romania) Florin Tincescu	Am	All
(Romania) RO1 Racing by Varu Nicu	Porsche 991 GT3 II Cup	21	(Romania) Camil Perian	Am	1–2, 4–5
(Belgium) Q1-trackracing	Porsche 718 Cayman GT4 Clubsport	43	(Brazil) Gustavo Condé	T	1
(Belgium) Q1-trackracing	Porsche 718 Cayman GT4 Clubsport	43	(Brazil) Cassio Homem de Mello	T	1
(Belgium) Q1-trackracing	Porsche 992 GT3 Cup	52	(Belgium) Xander Przybylak	Am	All
(Belgium) Q1-trackracing	Porsche 992 GT3 Cup	52	(Belgium) Laurent Vandervelde	Am	All
(Belgium) Q1-trackracing	Porsche 992 GT3 Cup	54	(Belgium) Jan Lauryssen	PA	4–5
(Belgium) Q1-trackracing	Porsche 992 GT3 Cup	55	(Brazil) Gustavo Condé	Am	3–4
(Belgium) Q1-trackracing	Porsche 992 GT3 Cup	55	(Brazil) Cassio Homem de Mello	Am	3–4
(Belgium) Q1-trackracing	Porsche 992 GT3 Cup	57	(Belgium) Nicolas Vandierendonck	PA	1–2
(Belgium) Q1-trackracing	Porsche 992 GT3 Cup	57	(Spain) Fidel Castillo	PA	1–2
(Belgium) Q1-trackracing	Porsche 992 GT3 Cup	57	(Belgium) Nicolas Vandierendonck	Am	3–5
(Belgium) Q1-trackracing	Porsche 992 GT3 Cup	57	(France) Quentin Antonel	Am	3–5
(Estonia) EST1 Racing	Porsche 992 GT3 Cup	47	(Estonia) Alex Reimann	Am	3 (Note: Raced as Am in Race 1 of Round 3 but moved to Pro-Am for Race 2)
(Estonia) EST1 Racing	Porsche 992 GT3 Cup	47	(Estonia) Alex Reimann	PA	3–5
(Estonia) EST1 Racing	Porsche 992 GT3 Cup	77	(Finland) Jori Ala-Jyrä	Am	1–3
(Estonia) EST1 Racing	Porsche 992 GT3 Cup	77	(Estonia) Indrek Jaaska	Am	1, 3–5
(Estonia) EST1 Racing	Porsche 992 GT3 Cup	77	(Estonia) Alex Reimann	Am	2
(Switzerland) Kessel Racing	Ferrari 488 Challenge	69 (Note: Entered as No. 169 in Round 2 at Spa due to numbering conflict with International GT Open entry for joint endurance race)	(Switzerland) Alexandre Bochez	Am	All
(Switzerland) Kessel Racing	Ferrari 488 Challenge	69	(Switzerland) Mikaël Bochez	Am	All
(Switzerland) Kessel Racing	Ferrari 488 Challenge	111	(United States) Stephen Earle	PA	1
(Switzerland) Kessel Racing	Ferrari 488 Challenge	111	(South Africa) David Perel	PA	1
(France) Van Straaten / Orhès Racing	Porsche 992 GT3 Cup	73	(France) Axel Van Straaten	PA	2, 4
(France) Van Straaten / Orhès Racing	Porsche 992 GT3 Cup	73	(France) Remi Van Straaten	PA	2, 4
(Italy) ZRS Motorsport	Porsche 992 GT3 Cup	78	(Italy) Fabio Babini	PA	1, 3–5
(Italy) ZRS Motorsport	Porsche 992 GT3 Cup	78	(Italy) Davide Scannicchio	PA	1, 3–5
(Italy) Enrico Fulgenzi Racing	Porsche 992 GT3 Cup	90	(Japan) Shintaro Akatsu	PA	2
(Italy) Enrico Fulgenzi Racing	Porsche 992 GT3 Cup	90	(Italy) Enrico Fulgenzi	PA	2
(Germany) Lionspeed GP	Porsche 718 Cayman GT4 Clubsport	99	(Spain) José García	T	3
(Germany) Lionspeed GP	Porsche 718 Cayman GT4 Clubsport	99	(Germany) Carlo Scholl	T	3

Icon	Class
PA	Pro-Am Cup
Am	Am Cup
T	GT Cup Trophy

== Results ==
Bold indicates overall winner.

Round	Circuit	Pole position Team	Pro-Am Cup Winning Team	Am Cup Winning Team	GT Cup Trophy Winning Team
Round	Circuit	Pole position Drivers	Pro-Am Cup Winning Drivers	Am Cup Winning Drivers	GT Cup Trophy Winning Drivers
1	(Portugal) Algarve International Circuit	(Italy) No. 44 Eugenio Pisani / SP Racing	**(Germany) No. 80 Mertel Motorsport**	(Belgium) No. 52 Q1-trackracing	(Belgium) No. 43 Q1-trackracing
1	(Portugal) Algarve International Circuit	(Italy) Eugenio Pisani (Monaco) Stefano Zanini	**(Spain) Jorge Cabezas** **(Spain) Iván Velasco**	(Belgium) Xander Przybylak (Belgium) Laurent Vandervelde	(Brazil) Gustavo Condé (Brazil) Cassio Homem de Mello
2	(Portugal) Algarve International Circuit	(Switzerland) No. 111 Kessel Racing	**(Germany) No. 80 Mertel Motorsport**	(Italy) No. 12 Ghinzani Arco Motorsport	(Belgium) No. 43 Q1-trackracing
2	(Portugal) Algarve International Circuit	(United States) Stephen Earle (South Africa) David Perel	**(Spain) Jorge Cabezas** **(Spain) Iván Velasco**	(Italy) Glauco Solieri	(Brazil) Gustavo Condé (Brazil) Cassio Homem de Mello
3	(Belgium) Circuit de Spa-Francorchamps	(Germany) No. 80 Mertel Motorsport	**(Spain) No. 116 Volcano Motorsport**	(Belgium) No. 52 Q1-trackracing	No entries
3	(Belgium) Circuit de Spa-Francorchamps	(Spain) Jorge Cabezas (Spain) Iván Velasco	**Evgenii Leonov** **(United Kingdom) Adam Christodoulou**	(Belgium) Xander Przybylak (Belgium) Laurent Vandervelde	No entries
4	(France) Circuit Paul Ricard	(Germany) No. 19 Mertel Motorsport	(Italy) No. 17 Rossocorsa Racing	**(Estonia) No. 47 EST1 Racing**	(Belgium) No. 007 Street-Art Racing
4	(France) Circuit Paul Ricard	(Italy) Stefano Bozzoni (Spain) Fernando Navarrete	(Italy) Andrea Belicchi (Italy) Lorenzo Ferdinando Innocenti	**(Estonia) Alex Reimann**	(France) Julien Darras (France) Jayan Fazal-Karim
5	(France) Circuit Paul Ricard	(Italy) No. 17 Rossocorsa Racing	**(Italy) No. 17 Rossocorsa Racing**	(Belgium) No. 57 Q1-trackracing	(Belgium) No. 007 Street-Art Racing
5	(France) Circuit Paul Ricard	(Italy) Andrea Belicchi (Italy) Lorenzo Ferdinando Innocenti	**(Italy) Andrea Belicchi** **(Italy) Lorenzo Ferdinando Innocenti**	(France) Quentin Antonel (Belgium) Nicolas Vandierendonck	(France) Julien Darras (France) Jayan Fazal-Karim
6	(Italy) Autodromo Nazionale di Monza	(Germany) No. 80 Mertel Motorsport	**(Belgium) No. 54 Q1-trackracing**	(Belgium) No. 52 Q1-trackracing	No entries
6	(Italy) Autodromo Nazionale di Monza	(Spain) Jorge Cabezas (Spain) Iván Velasco	**(Belgium) Jan Lauryssen**	(Belgium) Xander Przybylak (Belgium) Laurent Vandervelde	No entries
7	(Italy) Autodromo Nazionale di Monza	(Germany) No. 80 Mertel Motorsport	**(Germany) No. 80 Mertel Motorsport**	(Switzerland) Kessel Racing	No entries
7	(Italy) Autodromo Nazionale di Monza	(Spain) Jorge Cabezas (Spain) Iván Velasco	**(Spain) Jorge Cabezas** **(Spain) Iván Velasco**	(Switzerland) Alexandre Bochez (Switzerland) Mikaël Bochez	No entries
8	(Spain) Circuit de Barcelona-Catalunya	(Belgium) No. 54 Q1-trackracing	**(Belgium) No. 54 Q1-trackracing**	(Belgium) No. 52 Q1-trackracing	No entries
8	(Spain) Circuit de Barcelona-Catalunya	(Belgium) Jan Lauryssen	**(Belgium) Jan Lauryssen**	(Belgium) Xander Przybylak (Belgium) Laurent Vandervelde	No entries
9	(Spain) Circuit de Barcelona-Catalunya	(Italy) No. 10 Oregon Team	**(Belgium) No. 54 Q1-trackracing**	(Belgium) No. 57 Q1-trackracing	No entries
9	(Spain) Circuit de Barcelona-Catalunya	(Italy) Enrico Bettera (Italy) Marzio Moretti	**(Belgium) Jan Lauryssen**	(France) Quentin Antonel (Belgium) Nicolas Vandierendonck	No entries

== Championship standings ==
=== Points systems ===
Points are awarded to the top 10 (Pro-Am) or top 6 (Am, Trophy, Teams) classified finishers. If less than 6 participants start the race or if less than 75% of the original race distance is completed, half points are awarded. For the Endurance Race (Spa) points are multiplied by 2. At the end of the season, the 2 lowest race scores are dropped; if the points dropped are those obtained in the Endurance race, that will count as 2 races; however, the dropped races cannot be the result of disqualification or race bans.

==== Overall ====
Position	1st	2nd	3rd	4th	5th	6th	7th	8th	9th	10th
Points	15	12	10	8	6	5	4	3	2	1

==== Am, Trophy, and Teams ====
Position	1st	2nd	3rd	4th	5th	6th
Points	8	6	4	3	2	1

=== Drivers' championships ===
==== Overall ====
Pos.	Driver	Team	POR (Portugal)		SPA (Belgium)	LEC (France)		MNZ (Italy)		CAT (Spain)		Pts	Net Points
1	(Spain) Jorge Cabezas (Spain) Iván Velasco	(Germany) Mertel Motorsport	1	1	3	6	3	3	1	10	6	101	93
2	(Belgium) Xander Przybylak (Belgium) Laurent Vandervelde	(Belgium) Q1-trackracing	2	9	2	5	8	2	Ret	6	10	70	68
3	(Italy) Fabio Babini (Italy) Davide Scannicchio	(Italy) ZRS Motorsport	3	Ret		3	2	7	6	5	4	63	63
4	(Belgium) Jan Lauryssen	(Belgium) Q1-trackracing						1	2	1	1	57	57
5	Evgenii Leonov	(Spain) Volcano Motorsport	5	2	1	11	13	Ret	DNS	Ret	9	52	52
6	(Estonia) Alex Reimann	(Estonia) EST1 Racing			6	1	4	15	19†	4	8	50	50
7	(Italy) Andrea Belicchi (Italy) Lorenzo Ferdinando Innocenti	(Italy) Rossocorsa Racing				2	1	4	5	8	Ret	46	46
8	(Belgium) Nicolas Vandierendonck	(Belgium) Q1-trackracing	6	4	10	4	5	5	8	7	7	50	45
9	(Italy) Eugenio Pisani	(Italy) Eugenio Pisani / SP Racing	4	3	Ret	20	7	Ret	12	9	5	36	36
10	(Switzerland) Alexandre Bochez (Switzerland) Mikaël Bochez	(Switzerland) Kessel Racing	7	6	4	15	11	18	3	Ret	DNS	35	35
11	(France) Quentin Antonel	(Belgium) Q1-trackracing				4	5	5	8	7	7	35	35
12	(United Kingdom) Adam Christodoulou	(Spain) Volcano Motorsport			1							30	30
13	(Monaco) Stefano Zanini	(Italy) Eugenio Pisani / SP Racing	4	3	Ret	20	7	Ret	12	9	DNS	26	26
14	(Italy) Glauco Solieri	(Italy) Ghinzani Arco Motorsport	11†	5								25	25
14	(Italy) Glauco Solieri	(San Marino) GDL Racing			7			8	4	Ret	DNS	25	25
15	(Italy) Stefano Borghi	(San Marino) GDL Racing	Ret	15†	5	9	9	14	17†			16	16
16	(Italy) Gianluca de Lorenzi	(San Marino) GDL Racing	Ret	15†	5	9	9					16	16
17	(Spain) Fidel Castillo	(Belgium) Q1-trackracing	6	4	10							15	15
18	(Romania) Florin Tincescu	(Romania) RO1 Racing by Varu Nicu	10	8	Ret	7	12	10	9	12	11	14	14
19	(Italy) Stefano Bozzoni (Spain) Fernando Navarrete	(Germany) Mertel Motorsport	9	DNS	Ret	12	6	6	20†	Ret	Ret	12	12
20	(Finland) Jori Ala-Jyrä	(Estonia) EST1 Racing	13	10	6	13	14					11	11
21	(Romania) Camil Perian	(Romania) RO1 Racing by Varu Nicu	10	8	Ret			10	9	12	11	10	10
22	(Italy) Samuele Bosio	(San Marino) GDL Racing			7	Ret	Ret	12	10			9	9
23	(Germany) Luca Ludwig	(Germany) Mertel Motorsport			Ret	8	20†	11	7	14	13	7	7
23	(United Kingdom) Stephen Liquorish	(Germany) Mertel Motorsport				8	20†	11	7	14	13	7	7
24	(Portugal) Pedro Marreiros (Portugal) Paulo Pinheiro	(Portugal) Paulo Pinheiro	8	7								7	7
25	(Italy) Fabio Fabiani (Italy) Stefano Zerbi	(Italy) Fabio Fabiani / SP Racing	Ret	11	8	14	16	Ret	14	15	15	6	6
26	(Estonia) Indrek Jaaska	(Estonia) EST1 Racing	13	10		13	14	9	11	11	12	6	6
27	(Italy) Maurizio Fondi	(San Marino) GDL Racing			9							4	4
27	(Italy) Maurizio Fondi	(Italy) Ghinzani Arco Motorsport				17	15	13	15			4	4
28	(Italy) Roberto Bosio	(San Marino) GDL Racing			9	16	18	16	16			4	4
29	(Brazil) Gustavo Condé (Brazil) Cassio Homem de Mello	(Belgium) Q1-trackracing	14	12		10	10	Ret	DNS			2	2
30	(United States) Stephen Earle (South Africa) David Perel	(Switzerland) Kessel Racing	12	14†								0	0
31	(Netherlands) Laura van den Hengel	(Italy) Ghinzani Arco Motorsport				17	15	13	15			0	0
32	(France) Julien Darras (France) Jayan Fazal-Karim	(Belgium) Street-Art Racing	15	13		18	17					0	0
33	(France) Axel Van Straaten (France) Remi Van Straaten	(France) Van Straaten / Orhès Racing			Ret			19†	13			0	0
34	(Italy) Federico Lamperti	(San Marino) GDL Racing						14	17†			0	0
35	(United States) Jim Michaelian	(San Marino) GDL Racing						17	18			0	0
36	(Spain) José García (Germany) Carlo Scholl	(Germany) Lionspeed GP				19	19					0	0
37	(Italy) Mario Cordoni	(San Marino) GDL Racing				Ret	DNS					0	0
38	(Italy) Roberto Fecchio	(San Marino) GDL Racing			Ret					13	14	0	0
38	(Finland) Juuso Puhakka	(San Marino) GDL Racing			Ret							0	0
39	(Germany) Axel Sartingen	(Germany) Mertel Motorsport			Ret							0	0
40	(Japan) Shintaro Akatsu (Italy) Enrico Fulgenzi	(Italy) Enrico Fulgenzi Racing			Ret							0	0
Ineligible for championship
-	(Italy) Enrico Bettera (Italy) Marzio Moretti	(Italy) Oregon Team								3	2	-	-
-	(Spain) Lluc Ibáñez (Germany) Jörg Viebahn	(Spain) NM Racing								2	3	-	-
Pos.	Driver	Team	POR (Portugal)		SPA (Belgium)	LEC (France)		MNZ (Italy)		CAT (Spain)		Pts	Net Points

Key
Colour	Result
Gold	Race winner
Silver	2nd place
Bronze	3rd place
Green	Points finish
Blue	Non-points finish
Blue	Non-classified finish (NC)
Purple	Did not finish (Ret)
Black	Disqualified (DSQ)
Black	Excluded (EX)
White	Did not start (DNS)
White	Race cancelled (C)
White	Withdrew (WD)
Blank	Did not participate

† – Drivers did not finish the race, but were classified as they completed over 75% of the race distance.

==== Am ====
Pos.	Driver	Team	POR (Portugal)		SPA (Belgium)	LEC (France)		MNZ (Italy)		CAT (Spain)		Pts	Net Points
1	(Belgium) Xander Przybylak (Belgium) Laurent Vandervelde	(Belgium) Q1-trackracing	2	9	2	5	8	2	Ret	6	10	56	54
2	(France) Quentin Antonel (Belgium) Nicolas Vandierendonck	(Belgium) Q1-trackracing				4	5	5	8	7	7	38	38
3	(Switzerland) Alexandre Bochez (Switzerland) Mikaël Bochez	(Switzerland) Kessel Racing	7	6	4	15	11	18	3	Ret	DNS	33	33
4	(Italy) Glauco Solieri	(Italy) Ghinzani Arco Motorsport	11†	5								22	22
4	(Italy) Glauco Solieri	(San Marino) GDL Racing			7			8	4	Ret	DNS	22	22
5	(Romania) Florin Tincescu	(Romania) RO1 Racing by Varu Nicu	10	8	Ret	7	12	10	9	12	11	19	19
6	(Romania) Camil Perian	(Romania) RO1 Racing by Varu Nicu	10	8	Ret			10	9	12	11	16	16
7	(Estonia) Alex Reimann	(Estonia) EST1 Racing			6	1						14	14
8	(Italy) Stefano Bozzoni (Spain) Fernando Navarrete	(Germany) Mertel Motorsport	9	DNS	Ret	12	6	6	20†	Ret	Ret	13	13
9	(Italy) Stefano Borghi	(San Marino) GDL Racing	Ret	15†	5	9	9	14	17†			13	13
10	(Italy) Gianluca de Lorenzi	(San Marino) GDL Racing	Ret	15†	5	9	9					13	13
11	(Estonia) Indrek Jaaska	(Estonia) EST1 Racing	13	10		13	14	9	11	11	12	4	4
12	(Portugal) Pedro Marreiros (Portugal) Paulo Pinheiro	(Portugal) Paulo Pinheiro	8	7								8	8
13	(Finland) Jori Ala-Jyrä	(Estonia) EST1 Racing	13	10	6	13	14					7	7
14	(Italy) Samuele Bosio	(San Marino) GDL Racing			7	Ret	Ret	12	10			6	6
15	(Italy) Roberto Fecchio	(San Marino) GDL Racing								13	14	4	4
16	(Italy) Fabio Fabiani (Italy) Stefano Zerbi	(Italy) Fabio Fabiani / SP Racing	Ret	11	8	14	16	Ret	14	15	15	4	4
17	(Brazil) Gustavo Condé (Brazil) Cassio Homem de Mello	(Belgium) Q1-trackracing				10	10	Ret	DNS			3	3
18	(Italy) Maurizio Fondi	(San Marino) GDL Racing			9							0	0
18	(Italy) Maurizio Fondi	(Italy) Ghinzani Arco Motorsport				17	15	13	15			0	0
19	(Italy) Roberto Bosio	(San Marino) GDL Racing			9	16	18	16	16			0	0
20	(Netherlands) Laura van den Hengel	(Italy) Ghinzani Arco Motorsport				17	15	13	15			0	0
21	(Italy) Federico Lamperti	(San Marino) GDL Racing						14	17†			0	0
22	(United States) Jim Michaelian	(San Marino) GDL Racing						17	18			0	0
23	(Italy) Mario Cordoni	(San Marino) GDL Racing				Ret	DNS					0	0
Pos.	Driver	Team	POR (Portugal)		SPA (Belgium)	LEC (France)		MNZ (Italy)		CAT (Spain)		Pts	Net Points

Key
Colour	Result
Gold	Race winner
Silver	2nd place
Bronze	3rd place
Green	Points finish
Blue	Non-points finish
Blue	Non-classified finish (NC)
Purple	Did not finish (Ret)
Black	Disqualified (DSQ)
Black	Excluded (EX)
White	Did not start (DNS)
White	Race cancelled (C)
White	Withdrew (WD)
Blank	Did not participate

† – Drivers did not finish the race, but were classified as they completed over 75% of the race distance.

==== GT Cup Trophy ====
Pos.	Driver	Team	POR (Portugal)		SPA (Belgium)	LEC (France)		MNZ (Italy)	CAT (Spain)	Pts	Net Points
1	(France) Julien Darras (France) Jayan Fazal-Karim	(Belgium) Street-Art Racing	15	13		18	17			14	14
2	(Brazil) Gustavo Condé (Brazil) Cassio Homem de Mello	(Belgium) Q1-trackracing	14	12						8	8
3	(Spain) José García (Germany) Carlo Scholl	(Germany) Lionspeed GP				19	19			6	6
Pos.	Driver	Team	POR (Portugal)		SPA (Belgium)	LEC (France)		MNZ (Italy)	CAT (Spain)	Pts	Net Points

Key
Colour	Result
Gold	Race winner
Silver	2nd place
Bronze	3rd place
Green	Points finish
Blue	Non-points finish
Blue	Non-classified finish (NC)
Purple	Did not finish (Ret)
Black	Disqualified (DSQ)
Black	Excluded (EX)
White	Did not start (DNS)
White	Race cancelled (C)
White	Withdrew (WD)
Blank	Did not participate

=== Teams' championships ===
Two (2) best results of each team are counted towards the championship.

Pos.	Team	POR (Portugal)		SPA (Belgium)	LEC (France)		MNZ (Italy)		CAT (Spain)		Pts	Net Points
1	(Belgium) Q1-trackracing	2	4	2	4	4	1	2	1	1	70	65
1	(Belgium) Q1-trackracing	6	9	10	5	8	2	8	6	7	70	65
2	(Germany) Mertel Motorsport	1	1	3	6	3	3	1	10	6	46	45
2	(Germany) Mertel Motorsport	9	DNS	Ret	8	6	6	7	14	13	46	45
3	(Italy) ZRS Motorsport	3	Ret		3	2	7	6	5	4	25	25
4	(Spain) Volcano Motorsport	5	2	1	11	13	Ret	DNS	Ret	9	24	24
5	(Estonia) EST1 Racing	13	10	6	1	4	9	11	4	8	20	20
5	(Estonia) EST1 Racing				13	14	15	19	11	12	20	20
6	(Italy) Rossocorsa Racing				2	1	4	5	8	Ret	20	20
7	(Italy) Eugenio Pisani / SP Racing	4	3	Ret	20	7	Ret	12	9	5	11	11
8	(Switzerland) Kessel Racing	7	6	4	15	11	18	3	Ret	DNS	11	11
8	(Switzerland) Kessel Racing	12	14†								11	11
9	(San Marino) GDL Racing	Ret	15†	5	9	9	8	4	13	14	7	7
9	(San Marino) GDL Racing			7	16	18	12	10	Ret	DNS	7	7
10	(Italy) Ghinzani Arco Motorsport	11†	5		17	15	13	15			2	2
11	(Italy) Fabio Fabiani / SP Racing	Ret	11	8	14	16	Ret	14	15	15	0	0
11	(Romania) RO1 Racing by Varu Nicu	10	8	Ret	7	12	10	9	12	11	0	0
12	(Italy) Enrico Fulgenzi Racing			Ret							0	0
12	(Germany) Lionspeed GP				19	19					0	0
12	(Belgium) Street-Art Racing	15	13		18	17					0	0
12	(France) Van Straaten / Orhès Racing			Ret			19†	13			0	0
12	(Portugal) Paulo Pinheiro	8	7								0	0
Ineligible for championship
-	(Italy) Oregon Team								3	2	-	-
-	(Spain) NM Racing								2	3	-	-
Pos.	Team	POR (Portugal)		SPA (Belgium)	LEC (France)		MNZ (Italy)		CAT (Spain)		Pts	Net Points

Key
Colour	Result
Gold	Race winner
Silver	2nd place
Bronze	3rd place
Green	Points finish
Blue	Non-points finish
Blue	Non-classified finish (NC)
Purple	Did not finish (Ret)
Black	Disqualified (DSQ)
Black	Excluded (EX)
White	Did not start (DNS)
White	Race cancelled (C)
White	Withdrew (WD)
Blank	Did not participate
