= Quentin Antonel =

French racing driver (born 2006)

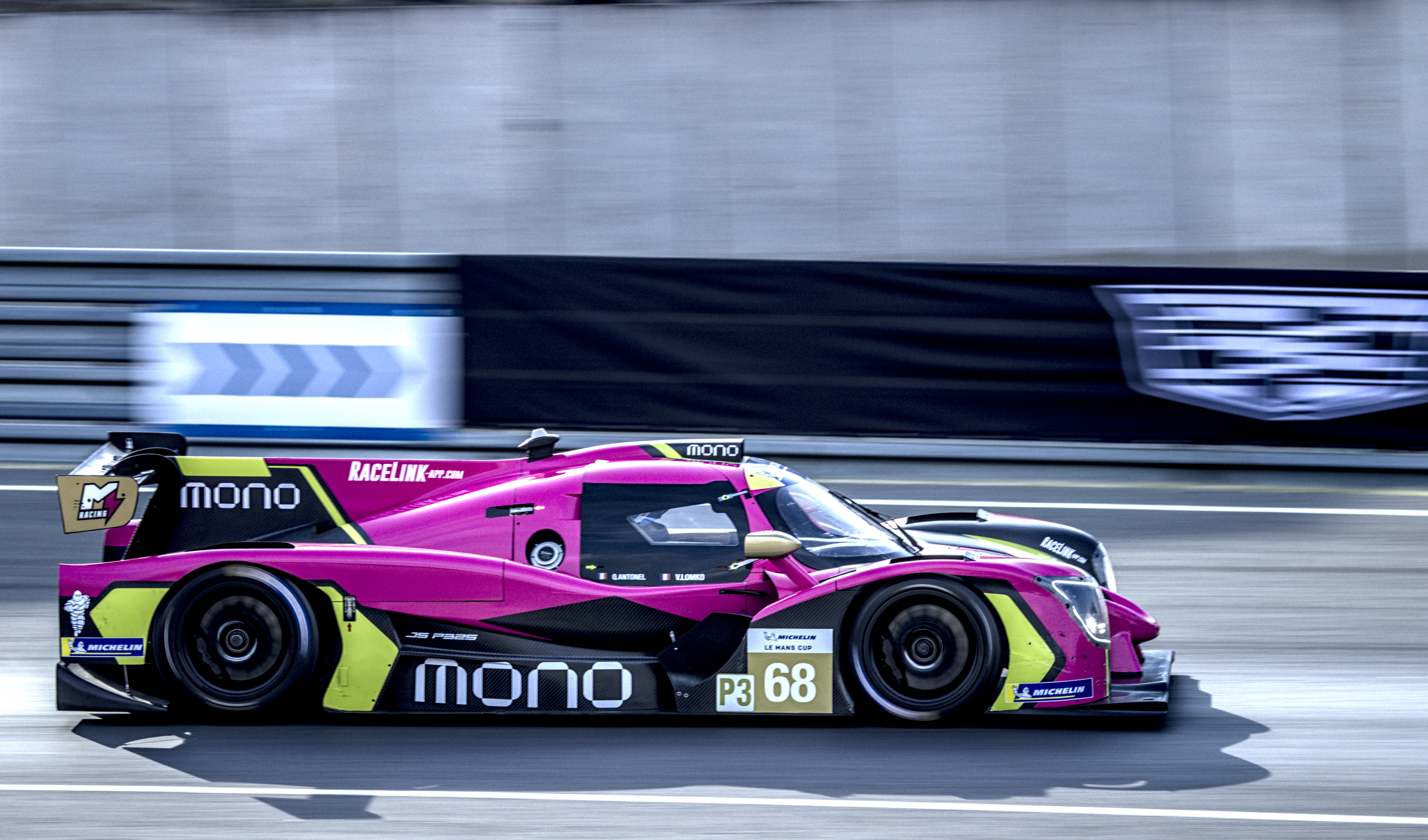
- Antonel's M Racing LMP3 in 2025
- Nationality: France
- Born: 2006 (age 19–20) Fréjus, France

European Le Mans Series career
- Debut season: 2025
- Current team: M Racing
- Categorisation: FIA Silver
- Car number: 68
- Co-driver: Stéphane Tribaudini
- Starts: 6 (6 entries)
- Wins: 0
- Podiums: 2
- Poles: 0
- Fastest laps: 0
- Best finish: 4th (LMP3) in 2025

Previous series
- 2024 2024 2023 2023 2022: Europ. Endurance Prototype Cup; Lamborghini Super Trofeo Europe; GT Cup Open Europe - Am; Porsche Carrera Cup Benelux; TTE Formula Renault Cup

Quentin Antonel (born 2006) is a French racing driver currently competing in the LMP3 class of the European Le Mans Series.

== Career ==
=== Early years ===
Coming from a racing family — his father having raced during the 1990s —, Antonel started his career in 2022, driving in the TTE Formula Renault Cup. During the first half of the season, he scored a podium at Val de Vienne and won at Lédenon. Going into the final two races, Antonel held second in the overall championship. He remained there at season's end thanks to a dominant final round by champion Franck Chappard, while winning the under-21 title.

In 2023, Antonel joined Q1-trackracing to contest the Porsche Carrera Cup Benelux. He finished 20th in the standings with a best result of seventh at the Hockenheimring. Antonel also competed in the final three events of the GT Cup Open Europe, driving a Porsche GT3 Cup car alongside Nicolas Vandierendonck in the Am class. The pair took two class wins and never finished off the class podium in their six starts. Thus, they were able to finish second in the Am standings. To cap off his campaign, Antonel raced in the 24 Hours of Zolder and finished eighth in class.

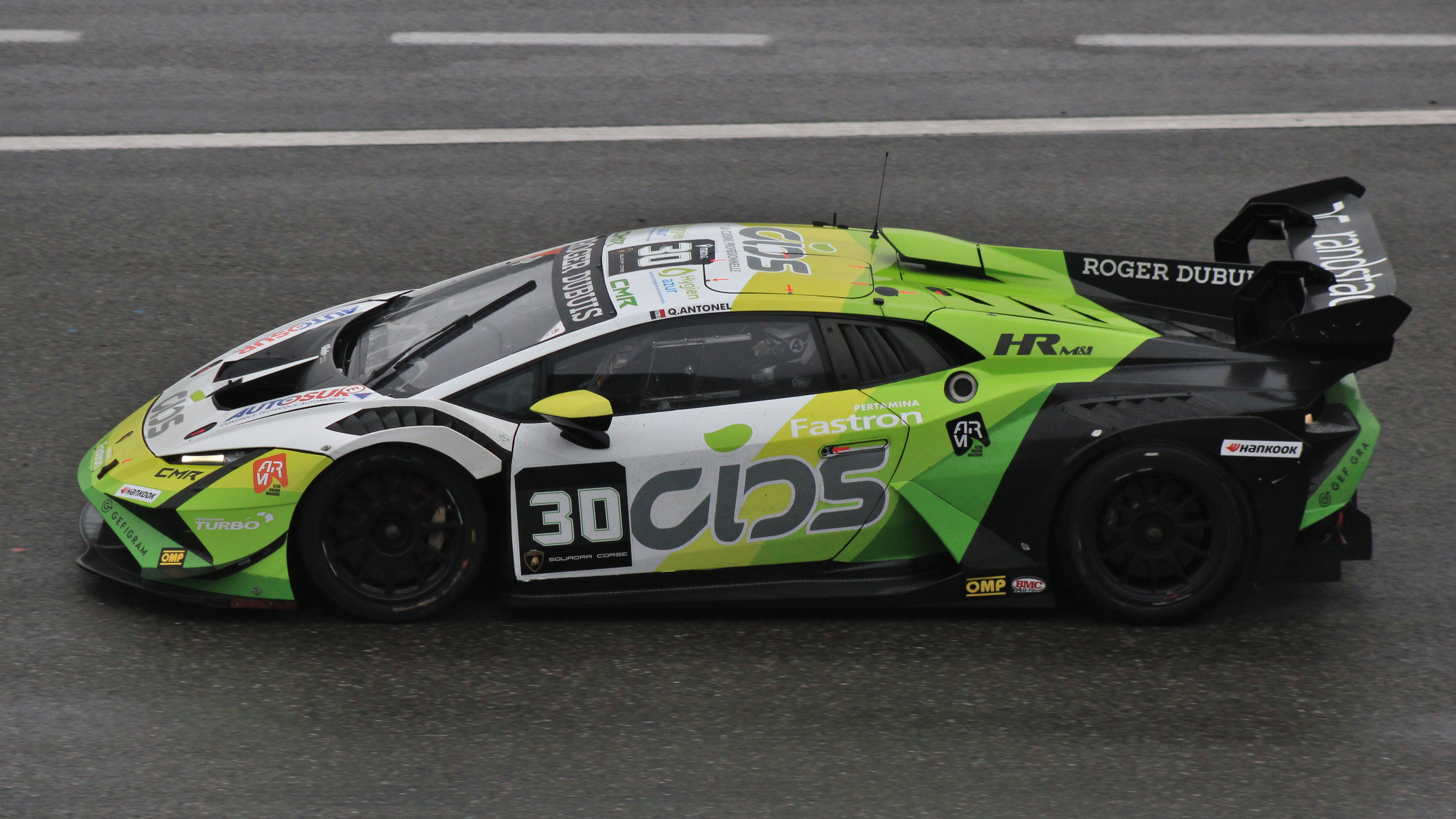
Antonel racing in Lamborghini Super Trofeo Europe in 2024

Antonel joined CMR in the 2024 Lamborghini Super Trofeo Europe season, partnering Loris Cabirou. With three points-scoring races, Antonel finished 25th in the Pro class's standings. He also drove in the Ultimate Cup Series - European Endurance Prototype Cup with Lamo Racing, driving five of the season's six races in the NP02 class.

=== LMP3 ===
At the end of 2024, Antonel participated in the rookie test of the European Le Mans Series. He drove a Ligier JS P320 for Racing Spirit of Léman. He then signed at M Racing to contest the 2025 European Le Mans Series alongside bronze-ranked Stéphane Tribaudini, piloting the new Ligier JS P325 chassis in the LMP3 class. Despite setting the pace in pre-season testing, Antonel had a quiet race at Barcelona on his way to fourth. At Le Castellet, the team fought for victory after a strong run from Tribaudini in wet conditions; they had to settle for second after Antonel was passed by Adrien Closmenil with 40 minutes to go. Thanks to a sudden downpour during Imola qualifying, Antonel slotted in third on the grid. During the race however, a puncture and subsequent damage forced the M Racing crew into retirement. Fifth at Spa was followed by a second place at Silverstone. At the final round in Portimão, Antonel ran third in class and was on course to secure second in the LMP3 standings, before an electrical issue with 40 minutes left caused the car to drop to eighth in the race and fourth in the championship.

Antonel also drove in the 2025 Road to Le Mans event alongside Vladislav Lomko.

== Racing record ==
=== Racing career summary ===
Season	Series	Team	Races	Wins	Poles	F/Laps	Podiums	Points	Position
2022	TTE Formula Renault Cup	LAMO Racing	14	2	?	?	9	1480	**2nd**
2023	Porsche Carrera Cup Benelux	Q1-trackracing	10	0	0	0	0	29	20th
2023	GT Cup Open Europe	Q1-trackracing	6	0	0	0	0	35	11th
2023	GT Cup Open Europe - Am	Q1-trackracing	6	2	2	3	6	35	**2nd**
2023	24 Hours of Zolder - GTA	Q1-trackracing	1	0	0	0	0	N/A	8th
2024	Lamborghini Super Trofeo Europe	CMR	10	0	0	0	0	5	25th
2024	Ultimate Cup Series - European Endurance Prototype Cup - NP02	Lamo Racing	5	0	0	0	0	3	47th
2024	Ultimate Cup Series - GT-Sprint Cup - UCS2	CMR	2	2	2	2	2	32	5th
2025	European Le Mans Series - LMP3	M Racing	6	0	0	0	2	62	4th
2025	Le Mans Cup - LMP3	M Racing	2	0	0	0	0	0	NC†
2026	European Le Mans Series - LMP3	M Racing	2	0	0	0	1	18	17th
2026	Le Mans Cup - LMP3	DKR Engineering	1	0	0	0	1	0	NC†

^{†} As Antonel was a guest driver, he was ineligible for championship points.
* Season still in progress.

=== Complete Lamborghini Super Trofeo Europe results ===
(key) (Races in bold indicate pole position; results in italics indicate fastest lap)

Year	Entrant	Class	1	2	3	4	5	6	7	8	9	10	11	12	13	Rank	Points
2024	CMR	Pro	IMO; 1; 15	IMO; 2; 29	SPA; 1; 18	SPA; 2; 22	LMS; 1; 11	LMS; 2 C	NÜR; 1; 20	NÜR; 2; 18	CAT; 1; 9	CAT; 2; 13	CAT; 3; 19	JER; 1	JER; 2	25th	5

=== Complete Ultimate Cup Series results ===
(key) (Races in bold indicate pole position; results in italics indicate fastest lap)

Year	Entrant	Class	Chassis	1	2	3	4	5	6	Rank	Points
2024	Lamo Racing	NP02	Nova Proto NP02	LEC1; 17	ALG; 19	HOC; 18	MUG; 17	MAG	LEC2; 16	47th	3

^{*} Season still in progress.

=== Complete European Le Mans Series results ===
(key) (Races in bold indicate pole position; results in italics indicate fastest lap)

Year	Entrant	Class	Chassis	Engine	1	2	3	4	5	6	Rank	Points
2025	M Racing	LMP3	Ligier JS P325	Toyota V35A 3.5 L V6	CAT; 4	LEC; 2	IMO; Ret	SPA; 5	SIL; 2	ALG; 8	4th	62
2026	M Racing	LMP3	Ligier JS P325	Toyota V35A 3.5 L V6	CAT; Ret	LEC; 2	IMO	SPA	SIL	ALG	17th	18

^{*} Season still in progress.
