= Ferrari F163 engine =

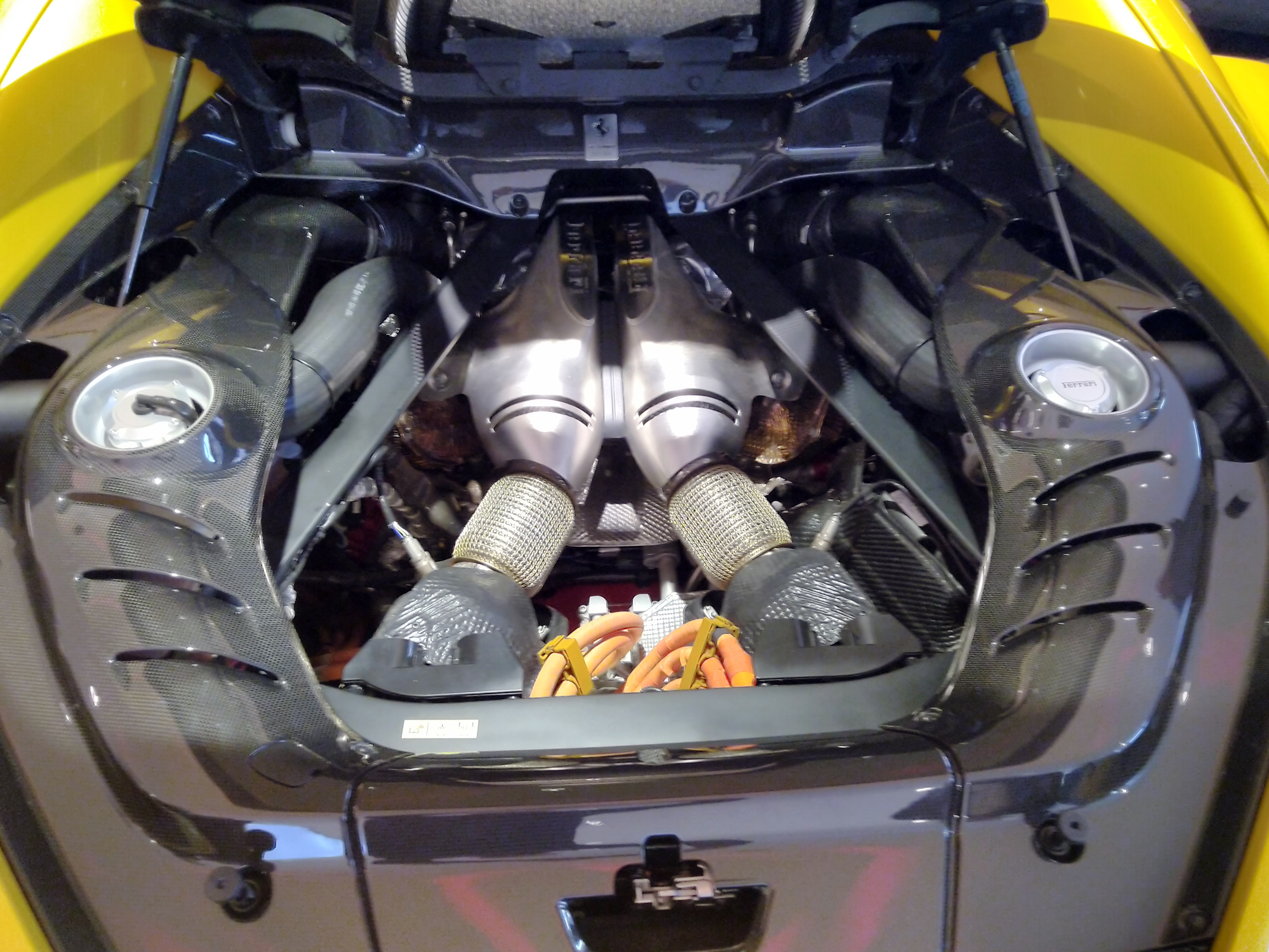

Overview
- Manufacturer: Ferrari
- Production: 2021–present

Layout
- Configuration: 120° V6
- Displacement: 3.0 L; 182.6 cu in (2,992 cc)
- Cylinder bore: 88 mm (3.5 in)
- Piston stroke: 82 mm (3.2 in)
- Valvetrain drive system: Timing Chain
- Compression ratio: 9.4:1

RPM range
- Max. engine speed: 8,000 RPM (F163 CE & CG); 8,500 RPM (F163 BC); 9,000 RPM (F163 CF)

Combustion
- Turbocharger: IHI twin-turbo
- Fuel system: Gasoline direct injection
- Fuel type: Gasoline
- Cooling system: Water-cooled

Output
- Power output: 654–888 hp (488–662 kW; 663–900 PS)
- Torque output: 314–627 lb⋅ft (426–850 N⋅m)

The Ferrari F163 engine is a 3.0-liter, 120°, twin-turbocharged V6 internal combustion piston engine, made by Ferrari. It is Ferrari's first turbocharged 6-cylinder engine designed and developed for road car use.

== Overview ==
The Tipo F163 BC is a 3.0 L, 120°, twin-turbo V6 engine; that has a maximum output of 663 PS (654 hp; 488 kW) at 8,000 rpm, in combination with a 167 PS (165 hp; 123 kW) electric motor. The electric motor complements 232 lb⋅ft (315 N⋅m); bringing the total combined system output to 830 PS (819 hp; 610 kW) and 546 lb⋅ft (740 N⋅m). A high-voltage accumulator positioned under the floor with an energy capacity of 7.45 kWh (26.8 MJ) enables an electrical range of 25 km (16 mi).

== Applications ==
Eng. code	Displacement Bore x stroke	Years	Usage	Peak power	Peak torque
F163 BC	2,992 cc (183 cu in); 88 x 82 mm 498.67 cc (30 cu in) per cylinder	2021–present	Ferrari 296 GTB; Ferrari 296 GTS	663 PS (488 kW; 654 hp) at 8000 rpm + 167 PS (123 kW; 165 hp) from electric motor = total 830 PS (610 kW; 819 hp)	740 N⋅m (546 lbf⋅ft) at 6250 rpm
	2,992 cc (183 cu in); 88 x 82 mm 498.67 cc (30 cu in) per cylinder	2025–present	Ferrari 296 Speciale Ferrari 296 Speciale A	700 PS (515 kW; 690 hp) at 8000 rpm + 180 PS (132 kW; 178 hp) from electric motor = total 880 PS (647 kW; 868 hp)	755 N⋅m (557 lb⋅ft) at 6000 rpm
	2,992 cc (183 cu in); 88 x 82 mm 498.67 cc (30 cu in) per cylinder	2024–present	Ferrari 296 Challenge	700 PS (515 kW; 690 hp) at 7500 rpm	740 N⋅m (546 lbf⋅ft) at 6000 rpm
F163 CE	2,992 cc (183 cu in); 88 x 82 mm 498.67 cc (30 cu in) per cylinder	2023–present	Ferrari 296 GT3	600 PS (441 kW; 592 hp) at 6250 rpm	710 N⋅m (524 lbf⋅ft) at 5500 rpm
	2,992 cc (183 cu in); 88 x 82 mm 498.67 cc (30 cu in) per cylinder	2026–present	Ferrari 296 GT Modificata	730 PS (537 kW; 720 hp) at 7500 rpm	800 N⋅m (590 lb⋅ft)
F163 CG	2,992 cc (183 cu in); 88 x 82 mm 498.67 cc (30 cu in) per cylinder	2023–present	Ferrari 499P	680 PS (500 kW; 671 hp) + 272 PS (200 kW; 268 hp) from electric motor	
F163 CF	2,992 cc (183 cu in); 88 x 82 mm 498.67 cc (30 cu in) per cylinder	2025	Ferrari F80	900 PS (662 kW; 888 hp) at 8750 rpm + 300 PS (221 kW; 296 hp) from 3 electric motors = total 1,200 PS (883 kW; 1,184 hp)	850 N⋅m (627 lbf⋅ft) at 5550 rpm
