= 2025 4 Hours of Portimão =

Endurance sportscar racing event

The layout of Algarve International Circuit

The 2025 4 Hours of Portimão was an endurance sportscar racing event held between 16 and 18 October 2025 at Algarve International Circuit in Portimão, Algarve, Portugal. It was the sixth and final of the 2025 European Le Mans Series season, and the ninth running of the event as part of the championship.

== Entry list ==
The provisional entry list was published on 8 October 2025 and originally consisted of 44 entries across 4 categories – 13 in LMP2, 8 in LMP2 Pro-Am, 10 in LMP3, and 13 in LMGT3. However, in the lead-up to the race, the no. 37 CLX – Pure Rxcing LMP2 entry of Tom Blomqvist, Alex Malykhin and Tristan Vautier was withdrawn from the event.

Miguel Cristóvāo made his return to the ELMS, driving in the No. 11 Eurointernational Ligier.

== Schedule ==
Date	Time (local: WEST)	Event
Friday, 16 October	11:00	Free Practice 1
Friday, 16 October	14:40	Bronze Driver Collective Test
Saturday, 17 October	10:10	Free Practice 2
Saturday, 17 October	15:15	Qualifying – LMGT3
Saturday, 17 October	15:40	Qualifying – LMP3
Saturday, 17 October	16:05	Qualifying – LMP2 Pro-Am
Saturday, 17 October	16:30	Qualifying – LMP2
Sunday, 18 October	14:30	Race

== Free practice ==
Two practice sessions were scheduled to be held before the event: one on Friday, and one on Saturday. Both sessions were scheduled to run for 90 minutes.

=== Practice 1 ===
The first practice session started at 11:00 WEST on Friday.

Class	No.	Entrant	Driver	Time
LMP2	43	(Poland) Inter Europol Competition	(United Kingdom) Nick Yelloly	1:31.725
LMP2 Pro-Am	29	(France) TDS Racing	(Switzerland) Mathias Beche	1:31.648
LMP3	17	(Switzerland) CLX Motorsport	(France) Adrien Closmenil	1:38.935
LMGT3	63	(Italy) Iron Lynx	(Germany) Fabian Schiller	1:42.973

- Note: Only the fastest car in each class is shown.

=== Practice 2 ===
The second practice session started at 10:10 WEST on Saturday.

Class	No.	Entrant	Driver	Time
LMP2	9	(Germany) Iron Lynx – Proton	(Italy) Matteo Cairoli	1:31.445
LMP2 Pro-Am	99	(United States) AO by TF	(Switzerland) Louis Delétraz	1:32.448
LMP3	17	(Switzerland) CLX Motorsport	(France) Adrien Closmenil	1:39.345
LMGT3	23	(United Kingdom) United Autosports	(United Kingdom) Wayne Boyd	1:42.672

- Note: Only the fastest car in each class is shown.

== Qualifying ==
Qualifying started at 15:15 WEST, with four sessions of fifteen minutes each, one session for each class. After qualifying, ELMS arranged the grid to put the LMP2s ahead of the LMP2 Pro-Am, LMP3, and LMGT3 cars.

=== Qualifying results ===
Pole position winners in each class are marked in bold.

Pos	Class	No.	Team	Driver	Time	Gap	Grid
1	**LMP2**	**9**	**(Germany) Iron Lynx – Proton**	**(Italy) Matteo Cairoli**	**1:30.771**	—	1
2	LMP2	18	(France) IDEC Sport	(France) Mathys Jaubert	1:30.814	+0.043	2
3	LMP2	43	(Poland) Inter Europol Competition	(United Kingdom) Nick Yelloly	1:30.924	+0.153	3
4	LMP2	28	(France) IDEC Sport	(Netherlands) Job van Uitert	1:30.947	+0.176	4
5	LMP2	48	(France) VDS Panis Racing	(France) Esteban Masson	1:30.972	+0.201	5
6	LMP2	10	(United Kingdom) Vector Sport	(Brazil) Pietro Fittipaldi	1:31.021	+0.250	6
7	LMP2	24	(United Kingdom) Nielsen Racing	(Austria) Ferdinand Habsburg	1:31.143	+0.372	7
8	LMP2	47	(Switzerland) CLX Motorsport	(Portugal) Manuel Espírito Santo	1:31.155	+0.384	8
9	LMP2	22	(United Kingdom) United Autosports	(Switzerland) Grégoire Saucy	1:31.159	+0.388	9
10	LMP2	34	(Poland) Inter Europol Competition	(Mozambique) Pedro Perino	1:31.165	+0.394	10
11	LMP2	30	(France) Duqueine Team	(France) Reshad de Gerus	1:31.480	+0.709	11
12	**LMP2 Pro-Am**	**77**	**(Germany) Proton Competition**	**(Italy) Giorgio Roda**	**1:32.467**	**+1.696**	13
13	LMP2 Pro-Am	99	(United States) AO by TF	(United States) P. J. Hyett	1:32.511	+1.740	14
14	LMP2 Pro-Am	29	(France) TDS Racing	(United States) Rodrigo Sales	1:32.777	+2.006	15
15	LMP2 Pro-Am	27	(United Kingdom) Nielsen Racing	(United States) John Falb	1:33.426	+2.655	16
16	LMP2 Pro-Am	3	(Luxembourg) DKR Engineering	(Greece) Georgios Kolovos	1:33.613	+2.842	17
17	LMP2 Pro-Am	83	(Italy) AF Corse	(France) François Perrodo	1:34.012	+3.241	18
18	LMP2 Pro-Am	21	(United Kingdom) United Autosports	(Brazil) Daniel Schneider	1:34.079	+3.308	19
19	**LMP3**	**17**	**(Switzerland) CLX Motorsport**	**(France) Adrien Closmenil**	**1:38.303**	**+7.532**	21
20	LMP3	12	(Germany) WTM by Rinaldi Racing	(Australia) Griffin Peebles	1:38.678	+7.907	22
21	LMP3	88	(Poland) Inter Europol Competition	(Belgium) Douwe Dedecker	1:38.900	+8.129	23
22	LMP3	11	(Italy) EuroInternational	(Mexico) Ian Aguilera	1:38.961	+8.190	24
23	LMP3	4	(Luxembourg) DKR Engineering	(Denmark) Mikkel Gaarde Pedersen	1:39.076	+8.305	25
24	LMP3	8	(Poland) Team Virage	(Spain) Daniel Nogales	1:39.089	+8.318	26
25	LMP3	31	(France) Racing Spirit of Léman	(France) Marius Fossard	1:39.144	+8.373	27
26	LMP3	35	(France) Ultimate	(France) Jean-Baptiste Lahaye	1:39.159	+8.388	28
27	LMP3	68	(France) M Racing	(France) Quentin Antonel	1:39.191	+8.420	29
28	**LMGT3**	**82**	**(United Kingdom) TF Sport**	**(Japan) Hiroshi Koizumi**	**1:43.446**	**+12.675**	31
29	LMGT3	59	(France) Racing Spirit of Léman	(France) Clément Mateu	1:43.452	+12.681	32
30	LMGT3	23	(United Kingdom) United Autosports	(United Kingdom) Michael Birch	1:43.494	+12.723	33
31	LMGT3	63	(Italy) Iron Lynx	(Singapore) Martin Berry	1:43.561	+12.790	34
32	LMGT3	57	(Switzerland) Kessel Racing	(Japan) Takeshi Kimura	1:43.820	+13.049	35
33	LMGT3	85	(Italy) Iron Dames	(France) Célia Martin	1:43.915	+13.144	36
34	LMGT3	50	(Italy) Richard Mille AF Corse	(Brazil) Custodio Toledo	1:44.558	+13.787	37
35	LMGT3	55	(Switzerland) Spirit of Race	(United Kingdom) Duncan Cameron	1:44.672	+13.901	38
36	LMGT3	66	(United Kingdom) JMW Motorsport	(United States) Scott Noble	1:44.758	+13.987	39
37	LMGT3	74	(Switzerland) Kessel Racing	(United Kingdom) Andrew Gilbert	1:44.856	+14.085	40
38	LMGT3	86	(United Kingdom) GR Racing	(United Kingdom) Michael Wainwright	1:45.239	+14.468	41
39	LMGT3	60	(Germany) Proton Competition	(Austria) Horst Felbermayr Jr.	1:45.373	+14.602	42
40	LMP3	15	(United Kingdom) RLR MSport	(France) Gillian Henrion	No time established		30
41	LMP2 Pro-Am	20	(Portugal) Algarve Pro Racing	(Greece) Kriton Lendoudis	No time established		20
42	LMP2	25	(Portugal) Algarve Pro Racing	(France) Théo Pourchaire	No time established		12
43	LMGT3	51	(Italy) AF Corse	(France) Charles-Henri Samani	No time established		43

== Race ==
The race was scheduled to start at 14:30 WEST, and ran for 4 hours.

=== Race results ===
The minimum number of laps for classification (70% of overall winning car's distance) was 95 laps. Class winners are in bold and ‡.

Pos	Class	No	Team	Drivers	Chassis	Tyre	Laps	Time/Retired
Pos	Class	No	Team	Drivers	Engine	Tyre	Laps	Time/Retired
1	**LMP2**	**48**	**(France) VDS Panis Racing**	**(United Kingdom) Oliver Gray** **(France) Esteban Masson** **(France) Charles Milesi**	**Oreca 07**	G	**135**	**4:01:32.584‡**
1	**LMP2**	**48**	**(France) VDS Panis Racing**	**(United Kingdom) Oliver Gray** **(France) Esteban Masson** **(France) Charles Milesi**	**Gibson GK428 4.2 L V8**	G	**135**	**4:01:32.584‡**
2	LMP2	43	(Poland) Inter Europol Competition	(France) Tom Dillmann (Poland) Jakub Śmiechowski (United Kingdom) Nick Yelloly	Oreca 07	G	135	+5.528
2	LMP2	43	(Poland) Inter Europol Competition	(France) Tom Dillmann (Poland) Jakub Śmiechowski (United Kingdom) Nick Yelloly	Gibson GK428 4.2 L V8	G	135	+5.528
3	LMP2	18	(France) IDEC Sport	(United Kingdom) Jamie Chadwick (France) Mathys Jaubert (Spain) Daniel Juncadella	Oreca 07	G	135	+37.339
3	LMP2	18	(France) IDEC Sport	(United Kingdom) Jamie Chadwick (France) Mathys Jaubert (Spain) Daniel Juncadella	Gibson GK428 4.2 L V8	G	135	+37.339
4	LMP2	28	(France) IDEC Sport	(France) Paul-Loup Chatin (France) Paul Lafargue (Netherlands) Job van Uitert	Oreca 07	G	135	+44.009
4	LMP2	28	(France) IDEC Sport	(France) Paul-Loup Chatin (France) Paul Lafargue (Netherlands) Job van Uitert	Gibson GK428 4.2 L V8	G	135	+44.009
5	**LMP2 Pro-Am**	**29**	**(France) TDS Racing**	**(Switzerland) Mathias Beche** **(France) Clément Novalak** **(United States) Rodrigo Sales**	**Oreca 07**	G	**135**	**+1:11.045‡**
5	**LMP2 Pro-Am**	**29**	**(France) TDS Racing**	**(Switzerland) Mathias Beche** **(France) Clément Novalak** **(United States) Rodrigo Sales**	**Gibson GK428 4.2 L V8**	G	**135**	**+1:11.045‡**
6	LMP2 Pro-Am	99	(United States) AO by TF	(United States) Dane Cameron (Switzerland) Louis Delétraz (United States) P. J. Hyett	Oreca 07	G	135	+1:28.500
6	LMP2 Pro-Am	99	(United States) AO by TF	(United States) Dane Cameron (Switzerland) Louis Delétraz (United States) P. J. Hyett	Gibson GK428 4.2 L V8	G	135	+1:28.500
7	LMP2	9	(Germany) Iron Lynx – Proton	(Italy) Matteo Cairoli (France) Macéo Capietto (Germany) Jonas Ried	Oreca 07	G	135	+1:29.668
7	LMP2	9	(Germany) Iron Lynx – Proton	(Italy) Matteo Cairoli (France) Macéo Capietto (Germany) Jonas Ried	Gibson GK428 4.2 L V8	G	135	+1:29.668
8	LMP2 Pro-Am	27	(United Kingdom) Nielsen Racing	(Australia) James Allen (United States) John Falb (Brazil) Sérgio Sette Câmara	Oreca 07	G	135	+1:30.640
8	LMP2 Pro-Am	27	(United Kingdom) Nielsen Racing	(Australia) James Allen (United States) John Falb (Brazil) Sérgio Sette Câmara	Gibson GK428 4.2 L V8	G	135	+1:30.640
9	LMP2	47	(Switzerland) CLX Motorsport	(Portugal) Manuel Espírito Santo (Brazil) Enzo Fittipaldi	Oreca 07	G	134	+1 Lap
9	LMP2	47	(Switzerland) CLX Motorsport	(Portugal) Manuel Espírito Santo (Brazil) Enzo Fittipaldi	Gibson GK428 4.2 L V8	G	134	+1 Lap
10	LMP2 Pro-Am	77	(Germany) Proton Competition	(Austria) René Binder (Italy) Giorgio Roda (Netherlands) Bent Viscaal	Oreca 07	G	134	+1 Lap
10	LMP2 Pro-Am	77	(Germany) Proton Competition	(Austria) René Binder (Italy) Giorgio Roda (Netherlands) Bent Viscaal	Gibson GK428 4.2 L V8	G	134	+1 Lap
11	LMP2 Pro-Am	3	(Luxembourg) DKR Engineering	(Switzerland) Neel Jani (Germany) Laurents Hörr (Greece) Georgios Kolovos	Oreca 07	G	134	+1 Lap
11	LMP2 Pro-Am	3	(Luxembourg) DKR Engineering	(Switzerland) Neel Jani (Germany) Laurents Hörr (Greece) Georgios Kolovos	Gibson GK428 4.2 L V8	G	134	+1 Lap
12	LMP2 Pro-Am	83	(Italy) AF Corse	(France) François Perrodo (Italy) Alessio Rovera (France) Matthieu Vaxivière	Oreca 07	G	134	+1 Lap
12	LMP2 Pro-Am	83	(Italy) AF Corse	(France) François Perrodo (Italy) Alessio Rovera (France) Matthieu Vaxivière	Gibson GK428 4.2 L V8	G	134	+1 Lap
13	LMP2 Pro-Am	21	(United Kingdom) United Autosports	(United Kingdom) Oliver Jarvis (Japan) Marino Sato (Brazil) Daniel Schneider	Oreca 07	G	134	+1 Lap
13	LMP2 Pro-Am	21	(United Kingdom) United Autosports	(United Kingdom) Oliver Jarvis (Japan) Marino Sato (Brazil) Daniel Schneider	Gibson GK428 4.2 L V8	G	134	+1 Lap
14	LMP2	10	(United Kingdom) Vector Sport	(Republic of Ireland) Ryan Cullen (Brazil) Pietro Fittipaldi (France) Vladislav Lomko	Oreca 07	G	133	+2 Laps
14	LMP2	10	(United Kingdom) Vector Sport	(Republic of Ireland) Ryan Cullen (Brazil) Pietro Fittipaldi (France) Vladislav Lomko	Gibson GK428 4.2 L V8	G	133	+2 Laps
15	LMP2 Pro-Am	20	(Portugal) Algarve Pro Racing	(United Kingdom) Olli Caldwell (Greece) Kriton Lendoudis (United Kingdom) Alex Quinn	Oreca 07	G	131	+4 Laps
15	LMP2 Pro-Am	20	(Portugal) Algarve Pro Racing	(United Kingdom) Olli Caldwell (Greece) Kriton Lendoudis (United Kingdom) Alex Quinn	Gibson GK428 4.2 L V8	G	131	+4 Laps
16	**LMP3**	**17**	**(Switzerland) CLX Motorsport**	**(France) Adrien Closmenil** **(Denmark) Theodor Jensen** **(France) Paul Lanchère**	**Ligier JS P325**	MI	**127**	**+8 Laps‡**
16	**LMP3**	**17**	**(Switzerland) CLX Motorsport**	**(France) Adrien Closmenil** **(Denmark) Theodor Jensen** **(France) Paul Lanchère**	**Toyota V35A-FTS 3.5 L Turbo V6**	MI	**127**	**+8 Laps‡**
17	LMP3	8	(Poland) Team Virage	(Algeria) Julien Gerbi (Netherlands) Rik Koen (Spain) Daniel Nogales	Ligier JS P325	MI	127	+8 Laps
17	LMP3	8	(Poland) Team Virage	(Algeria) Julien Gerbi (Netherlands) Rik Koen (Spain) Daniel Nogales	Toyota V35A-FTS 3.5 L Turbo V6	MI	127	+8 Laps
18	LMP3	4	(Luxembourg) DKR Engineering	(United States) Wyatt Brichacek (Denmark) Mikkel Gaarde Pedersen (Estonia) Antti Rammo	Ginetta G61-LT-P3 Evo	MI	127	+8 Laps
18	LMP3	4	(Luxembourg) DKR Engineering	(United States) Wyatt Brichacek (Denmark) Mikkel Gaarde Pedersen (Estonia) Antti Rammo	Toyota V35A-FTS 3.5 L Turbo V6	MI	127	+8 Laps
19	LMP3	11	(Italy) EuroInternational	(Mexico) Ian Aguilera (France) Fabien Michal (Portugal) Miguel Cristóvão	Ligier JS P325	MI	127	+8 Laps
19	LMP3	11	(Italy) EuroInternational	(Mexico) Ian Aguilera (France) Fabien Michal (Portugal) Miguel Cristóvão	Toyota V35A-FTS 3.5 L Turbo V6	MI	127	+8 Laps
20	LMP3	15	(United Kingdom) RLR MSport	(United Kingdom) Nick Adcock (France) Gillian Henrion (Denmark) Michael Jensen	Ligier JS P325	MI	126	+9 Laps
20	LMP3	15	(United Kingdom) RLR MSport	(United Kingdom) Nick Adcock (France) Gillian Henrion (Denmark) Michael Jensen	Toyota V35A-FTS 3.5 L Turbo V6	MI	126	+9 Laps
21	LMP3	88	(Poland) Inter Europol Competition	(United Kingdom) Tim Creswick (Belgium) Douwe Dedecker (United States) Reece Gold	Ligier JS P325	MI	126	+9 Laps
21	LMP3	88	(Poland) Inter Europol Competition	(United Kingdom) Tim Creswick (Belgium) Douwe Dedecker (United States) Reece Gold	Toyota V35A-FTS 3.5 L Turbo V6	MI	126	+9 Laps
22	LMP3	35	(France) Ultimate	(France) Jean-Baptiste Lahaye (France) Matthieu Lahaye (France) Louis Stern	Ligier JS P325	MI	125	+10 Laps
22	LMP3	35	(France) Ultimate	(France) Jean-Baptiste Lahaye (France) Matthieu Lahaye (France) Louis Stern	Toyota V35A-FTS 3.5 L Turbo V6	MI	125	+10 Laps
23	LMP3	68	(France) M Racing	(France) Quentin Antonel (France) Stéphane Tribaudini	Ligier JS P325	MI	125	+10 Laps
23	LMP3	68	(France) M Racing	(France) Quentin Antonel (France) Stéphane Tribaudini	Toyota V35A-FTS 3.5 L Turbo V6	MI	125	+10 Laps
24	LMP3	12	(Germany) WTM by Rinaldi Racing	(Germany) Torsten Kratz (Australia) Griffin Peebles (Germany) Leonard Weiss	Duqueine D09	MI	125	+10 Laps
24	LMP3	12	(Germany) WTM by Rinaldi Racing	(Germany) Torsten Kratz (Australia) Griffin Peebles (Germany) Leonard Weiss	Toyota V35A-FTS 3.5 L Turbo V6	MI	125	+10 Laps
25	LMP3	31	(France) Racing Spirit of Léman	(France) Marius Fossard (France) Jean-Ludovic Foubert (France) Jacques Wolff	Ligier JS P325	MI	124	+11 Laps
25	LMP3	31	(France) Racing Spirit of Léman	(France) Marius Fossard (France) Jean-Ludovic Foubert (France) Jacques Wolff	Toyota V35A-FTS 3.5 L Turbo V6	MI	124	+11 Laps
26	**LMGT3**	**82**	**(United Kingdom) TF Sport**	**(Angola) Rui Andrade** **(Republic of Ireland) Charlie Eastwood** **(Japan) Hiroshi Koizumi**	**Chevrolet Corvette Z06 GT3.R**	G	**124**	**+11 Laps‡**
26	**LMGT3**	**82**	**(United Kingdom) TF Sport**	**(Angola) Rui Andrade** **(Republic of Ireland) Charlie Eastwood** **(Japan) Hiroshi Koizumi**	**Chevrolet LT6.R 5.5 L V8**	G	**124**	**+11 Laps‡**
27	LMGT3	23	(United Kingdom) United Autosports	(United Kingdom) Michael Birch (United Kingdom) Wayne Boyd (Australia) Garnet Patterson	McLaren 720S GT3 Evo	G	124	+11 Laps
27	LMGT3	23	(United Kingdom) United Autosports	(United Kingdom) Michael Birch (United Kingdom) Wayne Boyd (Australia) Garnet Patterson	McLaren M840T 4.0 L Turbo V8	G	124	+11 Laps
28	LMGT3	85	(Italy) Iron Dames	(Belgium) Sarah Bovy (Denmark) Michelle Gatting (France) Célia Martin	Porsche 911 GT3 R (992)	G	124	+11 Laps
28	LMGT3	85	(Italy) Iron Dames	(Belgium) Sarah Bovy (Denmark) Michelle Gatting (France) Célia Martin	Porsche M97/80 4.2 L Flat-6	G	124	+11 Laps
29	LMGT3	63	(Italy) Iron Lynx	(Singapore) Martin Berry (United Kingdom) Lorcan Hanafin (Germany) Fabian Schiller	Mercedes-AMG GT3 Evo	G	123	+12 Laps
29	LMGT3	63	(Italy) Iron Lynx	(Singapore) Martin Berry (United Kingdom) Lorcan Hanafin (Germany) Fabian Schiller	Mercedes-AMG M159 6.2 L V8	G	123	+12 Laps
30	LMGT3	59	(France) Racing Spirit of Léman	(France) Erwan Bastard (France) Valentin Hasse-Clot (France) Clément Mateu	Aston Martin Vantage AMR GT3 Evo	G	123	+12 Laps
30	LMGT3	59	(France) Racing Spirit of Léman	(France) Erwan Bastard (France) Valentin Hasse-Clot (France) Clément Mateu	Aston Martin M177 4.0 L Turbo V8	G	123	+12 Laps
31	LMGT3	55	(Switzerland) Spirit of Race	(United Kingdom) Duncan Cameron (Republic of Ireland) Matt Griffin (South Africa) David Perel	Ferrari 296 GT3	G	123	+12 Laps
31	LMGT3	55	(Switzerland) Spirit of Race	(United Kingdom) Duncan Cameron (Republic of Ireland) Matt Griffin (South Africa) David Perel	Ferrari F163CE 3.0 L Turbo V6	G	123	+12 Laps
32	LMGT3	57	(Switzerland) Kessel Racing	(Japan) Takeshi Kimura (Brazil) Daniel Serra (United Kingdom) Ben Tuck	Ferrari 296 GT3	G	123	+12 Laps
32	LMGT3	57	(Switzerland) Kessel Racing	(Japan) Takeshi Kimura (Brazil) Daniel Serra (United Kingdom) Ben Tuck	Ferrari F163CE 3.0 L Turbo V6	G	123	+12 Laps
33	LMGT3	50	(Italy) Richard Mille AF Corse	(Italy) Riccardo Agostini (Brazil) Custodio Toledo (France) Lilou Wadoux	Ferrari 296 GT3	G	123	+12 Laps
33	LMGT3	50	(Italy) Richard Mille AF Corse	(Italy) Riccardo Agostini (Brazil) Custodio Toledo (France) Lilou Wadoux	Ferrari F163CE 3.0 L Turbo V6	G	123	+12 Laps
34	LMGT3	51	(Italy) AF Corse	(Denmark) Conrad Laursen (Italy) Davide Rigon (France) Charles-Henri Samani	Ferrari 296 GT3	G	123	+12 Laps
34	LMGT3	51	(Italy) AF Corse	(Denmark) Conrad Laursen (Italy) Davide Rigon (France) Charles-Henri Samani	Ferrari F163CE 3.0 L Turbo V6	G	123	+12 Laps
35	LMGT3	86	(United Kingdom) GR Racing	(United Kingdom) Tom Fleming (Italy) Riccardo Pera (United Kingdom) Michael Wainwright	Ferrari 296 GT3	G	123	+12 Laps
35	LMGT3	86	(United Kingdom) GR Racing	(United Kingdom) Tom Fleming (Italy) Riccardo Pera (United Kingdom) Michael Wainwright	Ferrari F163CE 3.0 L Turbo V6	G	123	+12 Laps
36	LMGT3	66	(United Kingdom) JMW Motorsport	(Italy) Gianmaria Bruni (United States) Jason Hart (United States) Scott Noble	Ferrari 296 GT3	G	122	+13 Laps
36	LMGT3	66	(United Kingdom) JMW Motorsport	(Italy) Gianmaria Bruni (United States) Jason Hart (United States) Scott Noble	Ferrari F163CE 3.0 L Turbo V6	G	122	+13 Laps
37	LMGT3	74	(Switzerland) Kessel Racing	(United Kingdom) Andrew Gilbert (Spain) Miguel Molina (Spain) Fran Rueda	Ferrari 296 GT3	G	122	+13 Laps
37	LMGT3	74	(Switzerland) Kessel Racing	(United Kingdom) Andrew Gilbert (Spain) Miguel Molina (Spain) Fran Rueda	Ferrari F163CE 3.0 L Turbo V6	G	122	+13 Laps
38	LMGT3	60	(Germany) Proton Competition	(Italy) Matteo Cressoni (Austria) Horst Felbermayr Jr. (Austria) Horst Felix Felbermayr	Porsche 911 GT3 R (992)	G	122	+13 Laps
38	LMGT3	60	(Germany) Proton Competition	(Italy) Matteo Cressoni (Austria) Horst Felbermayr Jr. (Austria) Horst Felix Felbermayr	Porsche M97/80 4.2 L Flat-6	G	122	+13 Laps
Not classified
	LMP2	34	(Poland) Inter Europol Competition	(Italy) Luca Ghiotto (Mozambique) Pedro Perino (France) Jean-Baptiste Simmenauer	Oreca 07	G	90	Mechanical
	LMP2	34	(Poland) Inter Europol Competition	(Italy) Luca Ghiotto (Mozambique) Pedro Perino (France) Jean-Baptiste Simmenauer	Gibson GK428 4.2 L V8	G	90	Mechanical
	LMP2	24	(United Kingdom) Nielsen Racing	(Portugal) Filipe Albuquerque (Turkey) Cem Bölükbaşı (Austria) Ferdinand Habsburg	Oreca 07	G	71	Power
	LMP2	24	(United Kingdom) Nielsen Racing	(Portugal) Filipe Albuquerque (Turkey) Cem Bölükbaşı (Austria) Ferdinand Habsburg	Gibson GK428 4.2 L V8	G	71	Power
	LMP2	22	(United Kingdom) United Autosports	(United Kingdom) Ben Hanley (Venezuela) Manuel Maldonado (Switzerland) Grégoire Saucy	Oreca 07	G	25	
	LMP2	22	(United Kingdom) United Autosports	(United Kingdom) Ben Hanley (Venezuela) Manuel Maldonado (Switzerland) Grégoire Saucy	Gibson GK428 4.2 L V8	G	25	
	LMP2	30	(France) Duqueine Team	(France) Reshad de Gerus (Israel) Roy Nissany (Denmark) Benjamin Pedersen	Oreca 07	G	18	
	LMP2	30	(France) Duqueine Team	(France) Reshad de Gerus (Israel) Roy Nissany (Denmark) Benjamin Pedersen	Gibson GK428 4.2 L V8	G	18	
	LMP2	25	(Portugal) Algarve Pro Racing	(Spain) Lorenzo Fluxá (Liechtenstein) Matthias Kaiser (France) Théo Pourchaire	Oreca 07	G	17	
	LMP2	25	(Portugal) Algarve Pro Racing	(Spain) Lorenzo Fluxá (Liechtenstein) Matthias Kaiser (France) Théo Pourchaire	Gibson GK428 4.2 L V8	G	17	

== Notes ==
European Le Mans Series
Previous race: 4 Hours of Silverstone	2025 season	Next race: none
