= 2025 4 Hours of Spa-Francorchamps =

Endurance sportscar racing event

Layout of Circuit de Spa-Francorchamps

The 2025 4 Hours of Spa-Francorchamps was an endurance sportscar racing event, held between 22 and 24 August 2025 at Circuit de Spa-Francorchamps in Stavelot, Belgium. It was the fourth of six rounds of the 2025 European Le Mans Series season, and the tenth running of the event as part of the championship.

== Entry list ==
The provisional entry list was published on 13 August 2025 and consisted of 44 entries across 4 categories – 13 in LMP2, 8 in LMP2 Pro-Am, 10 in LMP3, and 13 in LMGT3.

== Schedule ==
Date	Time (local: CEST)	Event
Friday, 22 August	11:00	Free Practice 1
Friday, 22 August	14:10	Bronze Driver Collective Test
Saturday, 23 August	9:00	Free Practice 2
Saturday, 23 August	12:30	Qualifying – LMGT3
Saturday, 23 August	12:52	Qualifying – LMP3
Saturday, 23 August	13:14	Qualifying – LMP2 Pro-Am
Saturday, 23 August	13:36	Qualifying – LMP2
Sunday, 24 August	13:00	Race

== Qualifying ==
Qualifying started at 12:30 CEST on Saturday, with four sessions of fifteen minutes each, one session for each class. After qualifying, ELMS arranged the grid to put the LMP2s ahead of the LMP2 Pro-Am, LMP3, and LMGT3 cars.

=== Qualifying results ===
Pole position winners in each class are marked in bold.

Pos	Class	No.	Team	Driver	Time	Gap	Grid
1	**LMP2**	**24**	**(United Kingdom) Nielsen Racing**	**(Austria) Ferdinand Habsburg**	**2:14.972**	—	1
2	LMP2	9	(Germany) Iron Lynx – Proton	(Italy) Matteo Cairoli	2:15.189	+0.217	2
3	LMP2	48	(France) VDS Panis Racing	(France) Charles Milesi	2:15.464	+0.492	3
4	LMP2	25	(Portugal) Algarve Pro Racing	(France) Théo Pourchaire	2:15.739	+0.767	4
5	LMP2	22	(United Kingdom) United Autosports	(Switzerland) Grégoire Saucy	2:16.449	+1.477	5
6	LMP2	18	(France) IDEC Sport	(Spain) Daniel Juncadella	2:16.498	+1.526	6
7	LMP2	28	(France) IDEC Sport	(France) Paul-Loup Chatin	2:16.580	+1.608	7
8	LMP2	30	(France) Duqueine Team	(France) Reshad de Gerus	2:16.877	+1.905	8
9	LMP2	47	(Switzerland) CLX Motorsport	(Brazil) Enzo Fittipaldi	2:16.934	+1.962	9
10	LMP2	43	(Poland) Inter Europol Competition	(United Kingdom) Nick Yelloly	2:16.956	+1.984	10
11	LMP2	10	(United Kingdom) Vector Sport	(France) Vladislav Lomko	2:17.221	+2.249	11
12	LMP2	37	(Lithuania) CLX – Pure Rxcing	(United Kingdom) Tom Blomqvist	2:17.408	+2.436	12
13	LMP2	34	(Poland) Inter Europol Competition	(Italy) Luca Ghiotto	2:17.561	+2.589	13
14	**LMP2 Pro-Am**	**77**	**(Germany) Proton Competition**	**(Italy) Giorgio Roda**	**2:19.636**	**+4.664**	14
15	LMP2 Pro-Am	99	(United States) AO by TF	(United States) P. J. Hyett	2:21.281	+6.309	15
16	LMP2 Pro-Am	3	(Luxembourg) DKR Engineering	(Greece) Georgios Kolovos	2:23.266	+8.294	16
17	LMP2 Pro-Am	29	(France) TDS Racing	(United States) Rodrigo Sales	2:23.614	+8.642	17
18	LMP2 Pro-Am	83	(Italy) AF Corse	(France) François Perrodo	2:23.636	+8.664	18
19	LMP2 Pro-Am	27	(United Kingdom) Nielsen Racing	(United States) John Falb	2:24.688	+9.716	19
20	LMP2 Pro-Am	21	(United Kingdom) United Autosports	(Brazil) Daniel Schneider	2:25.510	+10.538	20
21	**LMP3**	**17**	**(Switzerland) CLX Motorsport**	**(Denmark) Theodor Jensen**	**2:26.054**	**+11.082**	22
22	LMP3	12	(Germany) WTM by Rinaldi Racing	(Australia) Griffin Peebles	2:26.801	+11.829	23
23	LMP3	11	(Italy) EuroInternational	(Mexico) Ian Aguilera	2:26.971	+11.999	24
24	LMP2 Pro-Am	20	(Portugal) Algarve Pro Racing	(Greece) Kriton Lendoudis	2:27.282	+12.310	21
25	LMP3	4	(Luxembourg) DKR Engineering	(United States) Wyatt Brichacek	2:27.304	+12.332	25
26	LMP3	88	(Poland) Inter Europol Competition	(Belgium) Douwe Dedecker	2:28.447	+13.475	26
27	LMP3	31	(France) Racing Spirit of Léman	(France) Marius Fossard	2:28.775	+13.803	27
28	LMP3	15	(United Kingdom) RLR MSport	(France) Gillian Henrion	2:29.079	+14.107	28
29	LMP3	8	(Poland) Team Virage	(Netherlands) Rik Koen	2:29.406	+14.434	29
30	LMP3	68	(France) M Racing	(France) Quentin Antonel	2:29.695	+14.723	30
31	LMP3	35	(France) Ultimate	(France) Jean-Baptiste Lahaye	2:30.244	+15.272	31
32	**LMGT3**	**63**	**(Italy) Iron Lynx**	**(Singapore) Martin Berry**	**2:37.115**	**+22.143**	37
33	LMGT3	55	(Switzerland) Spirit of Race	(United Kingdom) Duncan Cameron	2:37.703	+22.731	32
34	LMGT3	59	(France) Racing Spirit of Léman	(France) Clément Mateu	2:37.810	+22.838	33
35	LMGT3	60	(Germany) Proton Competition	(Hong Kong) Antares Au	2:38.261	+23.289	34
36	LMGT3	85	(Italy) Iron Dames	(France) Célia Martin	2:38.301	+23.329	35
37	LMGT3	74	(Switzerland) Kessel Racing	(United Kingdom) Andrew Gilbert	2:38.508	+23.536	36
38	LMGT3	57	(Switzerland) Kessel Racing	(Japan) Takeshi Kimura	2:39.567	+24.595	38
39	LMGT3	50	(Italy) Richard Mille AF Corse	(Brazil) Custodio Toledo	2:39.720	+24.748	39
40	LMGT3	23	(United Kingdom) United Autosports	(United Kingdom) Michael Birch	2:40.659	+25.687	40
41	LMGT3	86	(United Kingdom) GR Racing	(United Kingdom) Michael Wainwright	2:41.647	+26.675	41
42	LMGT3	51	(Italy) AF Corse	(France) Charles-Henri Samani	2:42.041	+27.069	42
43	LMGT3	82	(United Kingdom) TF Sport	(Japan) Hiroshi Koizumi	2:42.610	+27.638	43
44	LMGT3	66	(United Kingdom) JMW Motorsport	(United States) Scott Noble	2:43.092	+28.120	44

== Race ==
=== Race results ===
The minimum number of laps for classification (70% of overall winning car's distance) was 61 laps. Class winners are in bold and ‡.

Pos	Class	No	Team	Drivers	Chassis	Tyre	Laps	Time/Retired
Pos	Class	No	Team	Drivers	Engine	Tyre	Laps	Time/Retired
1	**LMP2**	**48**	**(France) VDS Panis Racing**	**(United Kingdom) Oliver Gray (France) Esteban Masson (France) Charles Milesi**	**Oreca 07**	G	**88**	**4:00:03.682‡**
1	**LMP2**	**48**	**(France) VDS Panis Racing**	**(United Kingdom) Oliver Gray (France) Esteban Masson (France) Charles Milesi**	**Gibson GK428 4.2 L V8**	G	**88**	**4:00:03.682‡**
2	LMP2	43	(Poland) Inter Europol Competition	(France) Tom Dillmann (Poland) Jakub Śmiechowski (United Kingdom) Nick Yelloly	Oreca 07	G	88	+24.330
2	LMP2	43	(Poland) Inter Europol Competition	(France) Tom Dillmann (Poland) Jakub Śmiechowski (United Kingdom) Nick Yelloly	Gibson GK428 4.2 L V8	G	88	+24.330
3	LMP2	24	(United Kingdom) Nielsen Racing	(Portugal) Filipe Albuquerque (Turkey) Cem Bölükbaşı (Austria) Ferdinand Habsburg	Oreca 07	G	88	+45.243
3	LMP2	24	(United Kingdom) Nielsen Racing	(Portugal) Filipe Albuquerque (Turkey) Cem Bölükbaşı (Austria) Ferdinand Habsburg	Gibson GK428 4.2 L V8	G	88	+45.243
4	**LMP2 Pro-Am**	**20**	**(Portugal) Algarve Pro Racing**	**(United Kingdom) Olli Caldwell (Greece) Kriton Lendoudis (United Kingdom) Alex Quinn**	**Oreca 07**	G	**88**	**+1:01.973‡**
4	**LMP2 Pro-Am**	**20**	**(Portugal) Algarve Pro Racing**	**(United Kingdom) Olli Caldwell (Greece) Kriton Lendoudis (United Kingdom) Alex Quinn**	**Gibson GK428 4.2 L V8**	G	**88**	**+1:01.973‡**
5	LMP2	28	(France) IDEC Sport	(France) Paul-Loup Chatin (France) Paul Lafargue (Netherlands) Job van Uitert	Oreca 07	G	88	+1:03.373
5	LMP2	28	(France) IDEC Sport	(France) Paul-Loup Chatin (France) Paul Lafargue (Netherlands) Job van Uitert	Gibson GK428 4.2 L V8	G	88	+1:03.373
6	LMP2	34	(Poland) Inter Europol Competition	(Italy) Luca Ghiotto (Mozambique) Pedro Perino (France) Jean-Baptiste Simmenauer	Oreca 07	G	88	+1:31.410
6	LMP2	34	(Poland) Inter Europol Competition	(Italy) Luca Ghiotto (Mozambique) Pedro Perino (France) Jean-Baptiste Simmenauer	Gibson GK428 4.2 L V8	G	88	+1:31.410
7	LMP2 Pro-Am	21	(United Kingdom) United Autosports	(United Kingdom) Oliver Jarvis (Japan) Marino Sato (Brazil) Daniel Schneider	Oreca 07	G	88	+1:32.692
7	LMP2 Pro-Am	21	(United Kingdom) United Autosports	(United Kingdom) Oliver Jarvis (Japan) Marino Sato (Brazil) Daniel Schneider	Gibson GK428 4.2 L V8	G	88	+1:32.692
8	LMP2	47	(Switzerland) CLX Motorsport	(Mexico) Sebastián Álvarez (Brazil) Enzo Fittipaldi	Oreca 07	G	88	+1:35.071
8	LMP2	47	(Switzerland) CLX Motorsport	(Mexico) Sebastián Álvarez (Brazil) Enzo Fittipaldi	Gibson GK428 4.2 L V8	G	88	+1:35.071
9	LMP2	10	(United Kingdom) Vector Sport	(Republic of Ireland) Ryan Cullen (Brazil) Pietro Fittipaldi (France) Vladislav Lomko	Oreca 07	G	88	+1:36.015
9	LMP2	10	(United Kingdom) Vector Sport	(Republic of Ireland) Ryan Cullen (Brazil) Pietro Fittipaldi (France) Vladislav Lomko	Gibson GK428 4.2 L V8	G	88	+1:36.015
10	LMP2 Pro-Am	99	(United States) AO by TF	(United States) Dane Cameron (Switzerland) Louis Delétraz (United States) P. J. Hyett	Oreca 07	G	88	+1:36.658
10	LMP2 Pro-Am	99	(United States) AO by TF	(United States) Dane Cameron (Switzerland) Louis Delétraz (United States) P. J. Hyett	Gibson GK428 4.2 L V8	G	88	+1:36.658
11	LMP2 Pro-Am	83	(Italy) AF Corse	(France) François Perrodo (Italy) Alessio Rovera (France) Matthieu Vaxivière	Oreca 07	G	88	+1:39.325
11	LMP2 Pro-Am	83	(Italy) AF Corse	(France) François Perrodo (Italy) Alessio Rovera (France) Matthieu Vaxivière	Gibson GK428 4.2 L V8	G	88	+1:39.325
12	LMP2	9	(Germany) Iron Lynx – Proton	(Italy) Matteo Cairoli (France) Macéo Capietto (Germany) Jonas Ried	Oreca 07	G	88	+1:48.088
12	LMP2	9	(Germany) Iron Lynx – Proton	(Italy) Matteo Cairoli (France) Macéo Capietto (Germany) Jonas Ried	Gibson GK428 4.2 L V8	G	88	+1:48.088
13	LMP2	37	(Lithuania) CLX – Pure Rxcing	(United Kingdom) Tom Blomqvist (United Kingdom) Alex Malykhin (France) Tristan Vautier	Oreca 07	G	88	+1:50.601
13	LMP2	37	(Lithuania) CLX – Pure Rxcing	(United Kingdom) Tom Blomqvist (United Kingdom) Alex Malykhin (France) Tristan Vautier	Gibson GK428 4.2 L V8	G	88	+1:50.601
14	LMP2	30	(France) Duqueine Team	(France) Reshad de Gerus (Israel) Roy Nissany (Denmark) Benjamin Pedersen	Oreca 07	G	88	+2:04.320
14	LMP2	30	(France) Duqueine Team	(France) Reshad de Gerus (Israel) Roy Nissany (Denmark) Benjamin Pedersen	Gibson GK428 4.2 L V8	G	88	+2:04.320
15	LMP2 Pro-Am	29	(France) TDS Racing	(Switzerland) Mathias Beche (France) Clément Novalak (United States) Rodrigo Sales	Oreca 07	G	88	+4:43.133
15	LMP2 Pro-Am	29	(France) TDS Racing	(Switzerland) Mathias Beche (France) Clément Novalak (United States) Rodrigo Sales	Gibson GK428 4.2 L V8	G	88	+4:43.133
16	LMP2 Pro-Am	77	(Germany) Proton Competition	(Austria) René Binder (Italy) Giorgio Roda (Netherlands) Bent Viscaal	Oreca 07	G	87	+1 Lap
16	LMP2 Pro-Am	77	(Germany) Proton Competition	(Austria) René Binder (Italy) Giorgio Roda (Netherlands) Bent Viscaal	Gibson GK428 4.2 L V8	G	87	+1 Lap
17	LMP2 Pro-Am	3	(Luxembourg) DKR Engineering	(Germany) Laurents Hörr (Greece) Georgios Kolovos (France) Thomas Laurent	Oreca 07	G	87	+1 Lap
17	LMP2 Pro-Am	3	(Luxembourg) DKR Engineering	(Germany) Laurents Hörr (Greece) Georgios Kolovos (France) Thomas Laurent	Gibson GK428 4.2 L V8	G	87	+1 Lap
18	LMP2	18	(France) IDEC Sport	(United Kingdom) Jamie Chadwick (France) Mathys Jaubert (Spain) Daniel Juncadella	Oreca 07	G	87	+1 Lap
18	LMP2	18	(France) IDEC Sport	(United Kingdom) Jamie Chadwick (France) Mathys Jaubert (Spain) Daniel Juncadella	Gibson GK428 4.2 L V8	G	87	+1 Lap
19	LMP2	25	(Portugal) Algarve Pro Racing	(Spain) Lorenzo Fluxá (Liechtenstein) Matthias Kaiser (France) Théo Pourchaire	Oreca 07	G	87	+1 Lap
19	LMP2	25	(Portugal) Algarve Pro Racing	(Spain) Lorenzo Fluxá (Liechtenstein) Matthias Kaiser (France) Théo Pourchaire	Gibson GK428 4.2 L V8	G	87	+1 Lap
20	**LMP3**	**8**	**(Poland) Team Virage**	**(Algeria) Julien Gerbi (Netherlands) Rik Koen (Spain) Daniel Nogales**	**Ligier JS P325**	MI	**84**	**+4 Laps‡**
20	**LMP3**	**8**	**(Poland) Team Virage**	**(Algeria) Julien Gerbi (Netherlands) Rik Koen (Spain) Daniel Nogales**	**Toyota V35A-FTS 3.5 L Turbo V6**	MI	**84**	**+4 Laps‡**
21	LMP3	15	(United Kingdom) RLR MSport	(United Kingdom) Nick Adcock (France) Gillian Henrion (Denmark) Michael Jensen	Ligier JS P325	MI	83	+5 Laps
21	LMP3	15	(United Kingdom) RLR MSport	(United Kingdom) Nick Adcock (France) Gillian Henrion (Denmark) Michael Jensen	Toyota V35A-FTS 3.5 L Turbo V6	MI	83	+5 Laps
22	LMP3	88	(Poland) Inter Europol Competition	(United Kingdom) Tim Creswick (Belgium) Douwe Dedecker (United States) Reece Gold	Ligier JS P325	MI	83	+5 Laps
22	LMP3	88	(Poland) Inter Europol Competition	(United Kingdom) Tim Creswick (Belgium) Douwe Dedecker (United States) Reece Gold	Toyota V35A-FTS 3.5 L Turbo V6	MI	83	+5 Laps
23	LMP3	11	(Italy) EuroInternational	(Mexico) Ian Aguilera (France) Fabien Michal	Ligier JS P325	MI	83	+5 Laps
23	LMP3	11	(Italy) EuroInternational	(Mexico) Ian Aguilera (France) Fabien Michal	Toyota V35A-FTS 3.5 L Turbo V6	MI	83	+5 Laps
24	LMP3	68	(France) M Racing	(France) Quentin Antonel (France) Stéphane Tribaudini	Ligier JS P325	MI	83	+5 Laps
24	LMP3	68	(France) M Racing	(France) Quentin Antonel (France) Stéphane Tribaudini	Toyota V35A-FTS 3.5 L Turbo V6	MI	83	+5 Laps
25	LMP3	35	(France) Ultimate	(France) Jean-Baptiste Lahaye (France) Matthieu Lahaye (France) Louis Stern	Ligier JS P325	MI	83	+5 Laps
25	LMP3	35	(France) Ultimate	(France) Jean-Baptiste Lahaye (France) Matthieu Lahaye (France) Louis Stern	Toyota V35A-FTS 3.5 L Turbo V6	MI	83	+5 Laps
26	LMP3	12	(Germany) WTM by Rinaldi Racing	(Germany) Torsten Kratz (Australia) Griffin Peebles (Germany) Leonard Weiss	Duqueine D09	MI	83	+5 Laps
26	LMP3	12	(Germany) WTM by Rinaldi Racing	(Germany) Torsten Kratz (Australia) Griffin Peebles (Germany) Leonard Weiss	Toyota V35A-FTS 3.5 L Turbo V6	MI	83	+5 Laps
27	LMP3	4	(Luxembourg) DKR Engineering	(United States) Wyatt Brichacek (Denmark) Mikkel Gaarde Pedersen (Estonia) Antti Rammo	Ginetta G61-LT-P3 Evo	MI	83	+5 Laps
27	LMP3	4	(Luxembourg) DKR Engineering	(United States) Wyatt Brichacek (Denmark) Mikkel Gaarde Pedersen (Estonia) Antti Rammo	Toyota V35A-FTS 3.5 L Turbo V6	MI	83	+5 Laps
28	**LMGT3**	**59**	**(France) Racing Spirit of Léman**	**(France) Erwan Bastard (France) Valentin Hasse-Clot (France) Clément Mateu**	**Aston Martin Vantage AMR GT3 Evo**	G	**82**	**+6 Laps‡**
28	**LMGT3**	**59**	**(France) Racing Spirit of Léman**	**(France) Erwan Bastard (France) Valentin Hasse-Clot (France) Clément Mateu**	**Aston Martin M177 4.0 L Turbo V8**	G	**82**	**+6 Laps‡**
29	LMGT3	63	(Italy) Iron Lynx	(Singapore) Martin Berry (United Kingdom) Lorcan Hanafin (Germany) Fabian Schiller	Mercedes-AMG GT3 Evo	G	82	+6 Laps
29	LMGT3	63	(Italy) Iron Lynx	(Singapore) Martin Berry (United Kingdom) Lorcan Hanafin (Germany) Fabian Schiller	Mercedes-AMG M159 6.2 L V8	G	82	+6 Laps
30	LMGT3	57	(Switzerland) Kessel Racing	(United Kingdom) James Calado (Japan) Takeshi Kimura (United Kingdom) Ben Tuck	Ferrari 296 GT3	G	82	+6 Laps
30	LMGT3	57	(Switzerland) Kessel Racing	(United Kingdom) James Calado (Japan) Takeshi Kimura (United Kingdom) Ben Tuck	Ferrari F163CE 3.0 L Turbo V6	G	82	+6 Laps
31	LMGT3	85	(Italy) Iron Dames	(Belgium) Sarah Bovy (Denmark) Michelle Gatting (France) Célia Martin	Porsche 911 GT3 R (992)	G	82	+6 Laps
31	LMGT3	85	(Italy) Iron Dames	(Belgium) Sarah Bovy (Denmark) Michelle Gatting (France) Célia Martin	Porsche M97/80 4.2 L Flat-6	G	82	+6 Laps
32	LMGT3	50	(Italy) Richard Mille AF Corse	(Italy) Riccardo Agostini (Brazil) Custodio Toledo (France) Lilou Wadoux	Ferrari 296 GT3	G	82	+6 Laps
32	LMGT3	50	(Italy) Richard Mille AF Corse	(Italy) Riccardo Agostini (Brazil) Custodio Toledo (France) Lilou Wadoux	Ferrari F163CE 3.0 L Turbo V6	G	82	+6 Laps
33	LMGT3	51	(Italy) AF Corse	(Denmark) Conrad Laursen (Italy) Davide Rigon (France) Charles-Henri Samani	Ferrari 296 GT3	G	82	+6 Laps
33	LMGT3	51	(Italy) AF Corse	(Denmark) Conrad Laursen (Italy) Davide Rigon (France) Charles-Henri Samani	Ferrari F163CE 3.0 L Turbo V6	G	82	+6 Laps
34	LMGT3	86	(United Kingdom) GR Racing	(United Kingdom) Tom Fleming (Italy) Riccardo Pera (United Kingdom) Michael Wainwright	Ferrari 296 GT3	G	82	+6 Laps
34	LMGT3	86	(United Kingdom) GR Racing	(United Kingdom) Tom Fleming (Italy) Riccardo Pera (United Kingdom) Michael Wainwright	Ferrari F163CE 3.0 L Turbo V6	G	82	+6 Laps
35	LMGT3	82	(United Kingdom) TF Sport	(Angola) Rui Andrade (Republic of Ireland) Charlie Eastwood (Japan) Hiroshi Koizumi	Chevrolet Corvette Z06 GT3.R	G	82	+6 Laps
35	LMGT3	82	(United Kingdom) TF Sport	(Angola) Rui Andrade (Republic of Ireland) Charlie Eastwood (Japan) Hiroshi Koizumi	Chevrolet LT6.R 5.5 L V8	G	82	+6 Laps
36	LMGT3	74	(Switzerland) Kessel Racing	(United Kingdom) Andrew Gilbert (Spain) Miguel Molina (Spain) Fran Rueda	Ferrari 296 GT3	G	82	+6 Laps
36	LMGT3	74	(Switzerland) Kessel Racing	(United Kingdom) Andrew Gilbert (Spain) Miguel Molina (Spain) Fran Rueda	Ferrari F163CE 3.0 L Turbo V6	G	82	+6 Laps
37	LMGT3	55	(Switzerland) Spirit of Race	(United Kingdom) Duncan Cameron (Republic of Ireland) Matt Griffin (South Africa) David Perel	Ferrari 296 GT3	G	82	+6 Laps
37	LMGT3	55	(Switzerland) Spirit of Race	(United Kingdom) Duncan Cameron (Republic of Ireland) Matt Griffin (South Africa) David Perel	Ferrari F163CE 3.0 L Turbo V6	G	82	+6 Laps
38	LMGT3	66	(United Kingdom) JMW Motorsport	(Italy) Gianmaria Bruni (United States) Jason Hart (United States) Scott Noble	Ferrari 296 GT3	G	81	+7 Laps
38	LMGT3	66	(United Kingdom) JMW Motorsport	(Italy) Gianmaria Bruni (United States) Jason Hart (United States) Scott Noble	Ferrari F163CE 3.0 L Turbo V6	G	81	+7 Laps
39	LMP3	31	(France) Racing Spirit of Léman	(France) Marius Fossard (France) Jean-Ludovic Foubert (France) Jacques Wolff	Ligier JS P325	MI	80	+8 Laps
39	LMP3	31	(France) Racing Spirit of Léman	(France) Marius Fossard (France) Jean-Ludovic Foubert (France) Jacques Wolff	Toyota V35A-FTS 3.5 L Turbo V6	MI	80	+8 Laps
Not classified
	LMP3	17	(Switzerland) CLX Motorsport	(France) Adrien Closmenil (Denmark) Theodor Jensen (France) Paul Lanchère	Ligier JS P325	MI	74	Mechanical
	LMP3	17	(Switzerland) CLX Motorsport	(France) Adrien Closmenil (Denmark) Theodor Jensen (France) Paul Lanchère	Toyota V35A-FTS 3.5 L Turbo V6	MI	74	Mechanical
	LMGT3	60	(Germany) Proton Competition	(Hong Kong) Antares Au (Italy) Matteo Cressoni (Belgium) Alessio Picariello	Porsche 911 GT3 R (992)	G	56	Collision damage
	LMGT3	60	(Germany) Proton Competition	(Hong Kong) Antares Au (Italy) Matteo Cressoni (Belgium) Alessio Picariello	Porsche M97/80 4.2 L Flat-6	G	56	Collision damage
	LMGT3	23	(United Kingdom) United Autosports	(United Kingdom) Michael Birch (United Kingdom) Wayne Boyd (Australia) Garnet Patterson	McLaren 720S GT3 Evo	G	33	Accident
	LMGT3	23	(United Kingdom) United Autosports	(United Kingdom) Michael Birch (United Kingdom) Wayne Boyd (Australia) Garnet Patterson	McLaren M840T 4.0 L Turbo V8	G	33	Accident
	LMP2	22	(United Kingdom) United Autosports	(United Kingdom) Ben Hanley (Venezuela) Manuel Maldonado (Switzerland) Grégoire Saucy	Oreca 07	G	23	Accident
	LMP2	22	(United Kingdom) United Autosports	(United Kingdom) Ben Hanley (Venezuela) Manuel Maldonado (Switzerland) Grégoire Saucy	Gibson GK428 4.2 L V8	G	23	Accident
	LMP2 Pro-Am	27	(United Kingdom) Nielsen Racing	(Australia) James Allen (United States) John Falb (Brazil) Sérgio Sette Câmara	Oreca 07	G	23	Accident
	LMP2 Pro-Am	27	(United Kingdom) Nielsen Racing	(Australia) James Allen (United States) John Falb (Brazil) Sérgio Sette Câmara	Gibson GK428 4.2 L V8	G	23	Accident

== Notes ==
European Le Mans Series
Previous race: 4 Hours of Imola	2025 season	Next race: 4 Hours of Silverstone
