= 2024 4 Hours of Mugello =

Endurance sportscar racing event

The layout of the Mugello Circuit

The 2024 4 Hours of Mugello was an endurance sportscar racing event held between 27 and 29 September 2024, as the fifth round of the 2024 European Le Mans Series season.

== Entry list ==
The pre-event entry list consisted of 43 entries between 4 categories – 14 in LMP2, 8 in LMP2 Pro/Am, 10 in LMP3 and 11 in LMGT3.

Patrick Pilet replaced Felipe Drugovich in the No. 10 Vector Sport. After replacing Albert Costa at previous round Nick Yelloly became permanent driver of the No. 24 Nielsen Racing. David Heinemeier Hansson missed this round and the No. 27 Nielsen Racing competed with two drivers – Benjamin Pedersen and Will Stevens. Nico Pino joined Reshad de Gerus and Job van Uitert in the No. 28 IDEC Sport. Niels Koolen came back to the No. 30 Duqueine Team after missing previous round. Anthony Wells and Matt Bell were originally part of the No. 19 Team Virage lineup alongside Tristan Vautier, who joined the team at the previous race, but were later replaced by Georgios Kolovos and Raphaël Narac. Oliver Jarvis came back to the No. 21 United Autosports after missing previous round. Louis Stern joined Lahaye brothers in the No. 35 Ultimate. Jason Hart and Scott Noble replaced John Hartshorne and Phil Keen in the No. 66 JMW Motorsport. John Hartshorne announced his retirement from racing after an accident at previous round. Guilherme Oliveira joined Wyatt Brichacek and Alexander Mattschull in the No. 4 DKR Engineering.

== Schedule ==
| Date | Time (local: CEST) | Event |
|---|---|---|
| Friday, 27 September | 11:50 | Free Practice 1 |
| Friday, 27 September | 16:20 | Bronze Drivers Collective Test |
| Saturday, 28 September | 9:40 | Free Practice 2 |
| Saturday, 28 September | 14:10 | Qualifying - LMGT3 |
| Saturday, 28 September | 14:35 | Qualifying - LMP3 |
| Saturday, 28 September | 15:00 | Qualifying - LMP2 Pro-Am |
| Saturday, 28 September | 15:25 | Qualifying - LMP2 |
| Sunday, 29 September | 11:30 | Race |

== Free practice ==
- Only the fastest car in each class is shown.

| Free Practice 1 | Class | No. | Entrant | Time |
|---|---|---|---|---|
| Free Practice 1 | LMP2 | 65 | (France) Panis Racing | 1:34.687 |
| Free Practice 1 | LMP2 Pro/Am | 20 | (Portugal) Algarve Pro Racing | 1:35.218 |
| Free Practice 1 | LMP3 | 17 | (Switzerland) COOL Racing | 1:42.337 |
| Free Practice 1 | LMGT3 | 57 | (Switzerland) Kessel Racing | 1:46.583 |
| Free Practice 2 | Class | No. | Entrant | Time |
| Free Practice 2 | LMP2 | 9 | (Germany) Iron Lynx – Proton | 1:33.803 |
| Free Practice 2 | LMP2 Pro/Am | 24 | (United Kingdom) Nielsen Racing | 1:34.699 |
| Free Practice 2 | LMP3 | 8 | (Poland) Team Virage | 1:44.215 |
| Free Practice 2 | LMGT3 | 55 | (Switzerland) Spirit of Race | 1:46.903 |

== Qualifying ==
Pole position winners in each class are marked in bold.

| Pos | Class | No. | Team | Driver | Time | Gap | Grid |
|---|---|---|---|---|---|---|---|
| 1 | **LMP2** | **9** | **(Germany) Iron Lynx – Proton** | **(Italy) Matteo Cairoli** | **1:32.829** | — | 1 |
| 2 | LMP2 | 65 | (France) Panis Racing | (France) Charles Milesi | 1:32.866 | +0,037 | 2 |
| 3 | LMP2 | 25 | (Portugal) Algarve Pro Racing | (United Kingdom) Alexander Lynn | 1:33.054 | +0,225 | 3 |
| 4 | LMP2 | 34 | (Poland) Inter Europol Competition | (United Kingdom) Oliver Gray | 1:33.302 | +0,473 | 4 |
| 5 | LMP2 | 28 | (France) IDEC Sport | (France) Reshad de Gerus | 1:33.309 | +0,480 | 5 |
| 6 | LMP2 | 14 | (United States) AO by TF | (Switzerland) Louis Delétraz | 1:33.312 | +0,483 | 6 |
| 7 | LMP2 | 37 | (Switzerland) COOL Racing | (Denmark) Malthe Jakobsen | 1:33.497 | +0,668 | 7 |
| 8 | LMP2 | 22 | (United Kingdom) United Autosports | (United Kingdom) Benjamin Hanley | 1:33.674 | +0,845 | 8 |
| 9 | LMP2 | 43 | (Poland) Inter Europol Competition | (France) Tom Dillmann | 1:33.859 | +1,030 | 9 |
| 10 | LMP2 | 47 | (Switzerland) COOL Racing | (Austria) Ferdinand Habsburg | 1:33.889 | +1,060 | 10 |
| 11 | LMP2 | 27 | (United Kingdom) Nielsen Racing | (United Kingdom) William Stevens | 1:34.407 | +1,578 | 11 |
| 12 | LMP2 | 30 | (France) Duqueine Team | (Australia) James Allen | 1:35.466 | +2,637 | 12 |
| 13 | **LMP2 Pro/Am** | **77** | **(Germany) Proton Competition** | **(Italy) Giorgio Roda** | **1:35.840** | **+3,011** | 15 |
| 14 | LMP2 Pro/Am | 29 | (France) Richard Mille by TDS | (United States) Rodrigo Sales | 1:36.171 | +3,342 | 16 |
| 15 | LMP2 Pro/Am | 24 | (United Kingdom) Nielsen Racing | (United States) John Falb | 1:36.861 | +4,032 | 17 |
| 16 | LMP2 Pro/Am | 19 | (Poland) Team Virage | (Greece) Georgios Kolovos | 1:37.654 | +4,825 | 20 (Note: The No. 19 Team Virage was penalised for making an usafe rejoin during Qualifying session. Stewards moved the car back by two places on the starting grid.) |
| 17 | LMP2 Pro/Am | 21 | (United Kingdom) United Autosports | (Brazil) Daniel Schneider | 1:38.540 | +5,711 | 18 |
| 18 | LMP2 Pro/Am | 83 | (Italy) AF Corse | (France) François Perrodo | 1:39.008 | +6,179 | 19 |
| 19 | LMP2 Pro/Am | 20 | (Portugal) Algarve Pro Racing | (Greece) Kriton Lendoudis | 1:40.519 | +7,690 | 21 |
| 20 | **LMP3** | **17** | **(Switzerland) COOL Racing** | **(Portugal) Manuel Espírito Santo** | **1:41.083** | **+8,254** | 23 |
| 21 | LMP3 | 4 | (Luxembourg) DKR Engineering | (United States) Wyatt Brichacek | 1:41.545 | +8,716 | 24 |
| 22 | LMP3 | 88 | (Poland) Inter Europol Competition | (United Kingdom) Kai Askey | 1:41.554 | +8,725 | 25 |
| 23 | LMP3 | 31 | (Switzerland) Racing Spirit of Léman | (France) Antoine Doquin | 1:41.731 | +8,902 | 26 |
| 24 | LMP3 | 35 | (France) Ultimate | (France) Jean-Baptiste Lahaye | 1:41.841 | +9,012 | 27 |
| 25 | LMP3 | 12 | (Germany) WTM by Rinaldi Racing | (Colombia) Óscar Tunjo | 1:41.885 | +9,056 | 28 |
| 26 | LMP3 | 15 | (United Kingdom) RLR M Sport | (France) Gaël Julien | 1:42.117 | +9,288 | 29 |
| 27 | LMP3 | 8 | (Poland) Team Virage | (France) Gillian Henrion | 1:42.220 | +9,391 | 30 |
| 28 | LMP3 | 11 | (Italy) Eurointernational | (Canada) Adam Ali | 1:42.795 | +9,966 | 31 |
| 29 | LMP2 Pro/Am | 3 | (Luxembourg) DKR Engineering | (Australia) Andres Latorre Canon | 1:42.992 | +10,163 | 22 |
| 30 | LMP3 | 5 | (United Kingdom) RLR M Sport | (Canada) Daniel Ali | 1:43.485 | +10,656 | 32 |
| 31 | LMP2 | 23 | (United Kingdom) United Autosports | (United Kingdom) Paul di Resta | 1:45.874 | +13,045 | 13 |
| 32 | **LMGT3** | **59** | **(Switzerland) Racing Spirit of Léman** | **(United States) Derek DeBoer** | **1:47.891** | **+15,062** | 33 |
| 33 | LMGT3 | 85 | (Italy) Iron Dames | (Belgium) Sarah Bovy | 1:48.015 | +15,186 | 34 |
| 34 | LMGT3 | 97 | (United Kingdom) Grid Motorsport by TF | (Singapore) Martin Berry | 1:48.091 | +15,262 | 35 |
| 35 | LMGT3 | 50 | (Denmark) Formula Racing | (Denmark) Johnny Laursen | 1:48.190 | +15,361 | 36 |
| 36 | LMGT3 | 63 | (Italy) Iron Lynx | (Japan) Hiroshi Hamaguchi | 1:48.368 | +15,539 | 37 |
| 37 | LMGT3 | 66 | (United Kingdom) JMW Motorsport | (United States) Scott Noble | 1:49.058 | +16,229 | 38 |
| 38 | LMGT3 | 51 | (Italy) AF Corse | (France) Charles-Henri Samani | 1:49.231 | +16,402 | 39 |
| 39 | LMGT3 | 57 | (Switzerland) Kessel Racing | (Japan) Takeshi Kimura | 1:49.443 | +16,614 | 40 |
| 40 | LMGT3 | 86 | (United Kingdom) GR Racing | (United Kingdom) Michael Wainwright | 1:49.717 | +16,888 | 41 |
| 41 | LMGT3 | 55 | (Switzerland) Spirit of Race | (United Kingdom) Duncan Cameron | 1:50.382 | +17,553 | 42 |
| 42 | LMGT3 | 60 | (Germany) Proton Competition | (Italy) Claudio Schiavoni | 1:51.498 | +18,669 | 43 |
| 43 | LMP2 | 10 | (United Kingdom) Vector Sport | — (Note: The No. 10 Vector Sport lost all its lap times for causing a red flag during Qualifying session. Stewards allowed the crew to participate in the race, but the fastest driver of that car was obliged to start from the back of the LMP2 grid.) | | | 14 |

== Race ==
=== Race result ===
The minimum number of laps for classification (70% of overall winning car's distance) was 79 laps. Class winners are marked in bold.

Final Classification
| Pos | Class | No | Team | Drivers | Car | Tyres | Laps | Time/Gap |
|---|---|---|---|---|---|---|---|---|
| 1 | **LMP2** | **9** | **(Germany) Iron Lynx – Proton** | **(Germany) Jonas Ried (France) Macéo Capietto (Italy) Matteo Cairoli** | **Oreca 07** | G | **114** | **4:20:02.008** |
| 2 | LMP2 | 25 | (Portugal) Algarve Pro Racing | (Liechtenstein) Matthias Kaiser (United Kingdom) Olli Caldwell (United Kingdom) Alexander Lynn | Oreca 07 | G | 114 | +6.580 |
| 3 | LMP2 | 34 | (Poland) Inter Europol Competition | (United Kingdom) Oliver Gray (France) Clément Novalak (Italy) Luca Ghiotto | Oreca 07 | G | 114 | +28.308 |
| 4 | LMP2 | 65 | (France) Panis Racing | (United Kingdom) Manuel Maldonado (France) Charles Milesi (Monaco) Arthur Leclerc | Oreca 07 | G | 114 | +40.703 |
| 5 | LMP2 | 14 | (United States) AO by TF | (United Kingdom) Jonny Edgar (Switzerland) Louis Delétraz (Poland) Robert Kubica | Oreca 07 | G | 114 | +43.196 |
| 6 | LMP2 | 23 | (United Kingdom) United Autosports | (United States) Bijoy Garg (Switzerland) Fabio Scherer (United Kingdom) Paul di Resta | Oreca 07 | G | 114 | +47.218 |
| 7 | LMP2 | 43 | (Poland) Inter Europol Competition | (Mexico) Sebastián Álvarez (France) Vladislav Lomko (France) Tom Dillmann | Oreca 07 | G | 114 | +50.048 |
| 8 | **LMP2 Pro/Am** | **29** | **(France) Richard Mille by TDS** | **(United States) Rodrigo Sales (Switzerland) Mathias Beche (Switzerland) Grégoire Saucy** | **Oreca 07** | G | **114** | **+51.579** |
| 9 | LMP2 | 30 | (France) Duqueine Team | (Netherlands) Niels Koolen (France) Jean-Baptiste Simmenauer (Australia) James Allen | Oreca 07 | G | 114 | +1:01.259 |
| 10 | LMP2 Pro/Am | 20 | (Portugal) Algarve Pro Racing | (Greece) Kriton Lendoudis (United Kingdom) Richard Bradley (United Kingdom) Alex Quinn | Oreca 07 | G | 114 | +1:02.888 |
| 11 | LMP2 Pro/Am | 77 | (Germany) Proton Competition | (Italy) Giorgio Roda (Austria) René Binder (Netherlands) Bent Viscaal | Oreca 07 | G | 114 | +1:16.347 |
| 12 | LMP2 Pro/Am | 21 | (United Kingdom) United Autosports | (Brazil) Daniel Schneider (United Kingdom) Andrew Meyrick (United Kingdom) Oliver Jarvis | Oreca 07 | G | 114 | +1:18.825 |
| 13 | LMP2 | 37 | (Switzerland) COOL Racing | (Spain) Lorenzo Fluxá (Denmark) Malthe Jakobsen (Japan) Ritomo Miyata | Oreca 07 | G | 114 | +1:18.943 |
| 14 | LMP2 Pro/Am | 24 | (United Kingdom) Nielsen Racing | (United States) John Falb (United Kingdom) Colin Noble (United Kingdom) Nicholas Yelloly | Oreca 07 | G | 114 | +1:20.450 |
| 15 | LMP2 Pro/Am | 19 | (Poland) Team Virage | (Greece) Georgios Kolovos (France) Raphaël Narac (France) Tristan Vautier | Oreca 07 | G | 114 | +1:24.806 |
| 16 | LMP2 | 27 | (United Kingdom) Nielsen Racing | (Denmark) Benjamin Pedersen (United Kingdom) William Stevens | Oreca 07 | G | 114 | +1:25.477 |
| 17 | LMP2 | 22 | (United Kingdom) United Autosports | (Romania) Filip Ugran (Japan) Marino Sato (United Kingdom) Benjamin Hanley | Oreca 07 | G | 114 | +1:27.070 |
| 18 | LMP2 Pro/Am | 83 | (Italy) AF Corse | (France) François Perrodo (France) Matthieu Vaxivière (Italy) Alessio Rovera | Oreca 07 | G | 113 | +1 Lap |
| 19 | LMP2 | 10 | (United Kingdom) Vector Sport | (United Kingdom) Ryan Cullen (Monaco) Stéphane Richelmi (France) Patrick Pilet | Oreca 07 | G | 110 | +4 Laps |
| 20 | **LMP3** | **8** | **(Poland) Team Virage** | **(Algeria) Julien Gerbi (Portugal) Bernardo Pinheiro (France) Gillian Henrion** | **Ligier JS P320** | MI | **110** | **+4 Laps** |
| 21 | LMP3 | 15 | (United Kingdom) RLR M Sport | (Denmark) Michael Jensen (United Kingdom) Nick Adcock (France) Gaël Julien | Ligier JS P320 | MI | 110 | +4 Laps |
| 22 | LMP3 | 88 | (Poland) Inter Europol Competition | (United Arab Emirates) Alexander Bukhantsov (United Kingdom) Kai Askey (Portugal) Pedro Perino (Note: Pedro Perino failed to meet the minimum driving time to score points.) | Ligier JS P320 | MI | 109 | +5 Laps |
| 23 | LMP3 | 31 | (Switzerland) Racing Spirit of Léman | (France) Jacques Wolff (France) Jean-Ludovic Foubert (France) Antoine Doquin | Ligier JS P320 | MI | 109 | +5 Laps |
| 24 | LMP3 | 35 | (France) Ultimate | (France) Louis Stern (France) Jean-Baptiste Lahaye (France) Matthieu Lahaye (Note: Matthieu Lahaye failed to meet the minimum driving time to score points.) | Ligier JS P320 | MI | 109 | +5 Laps |
| 25 | LMP3 | 12 | (Germany) WTM by Rinaldi Racing | (Germany) Torsten Kratz (Germany) Leonard Weiss (Colombia) Óscar Tunjo | Duqueine M30 - D08 | MI | 109 | +5 Laps |
| 26 | LMP3 | 11 | (Italy) Eurointernational | (United Kingdom) Matthew Richard Bell (Canada) Adam Ali | Ligier JS P320 | MI | 109 | +5 Laps |
| 27 | LMP3 | 5 | (United Kingdom) RLR M Sport | (Canada) James Dayson (Canada) Daniel Ali (United Kingdom) Bailey Voisin | Ligier JS P320 | MI | 108 | +6 Laps |
| 28 | **LMGT3** | **57** | **(Switzerland) Kessel Racing** | **(Japan) Takeshi Kimura (France) Esteban Masson (Brazil) Daniel Serra** | **Ferrari 296 LMGT3** | G | **107** | **+7 Laps** |
| 29 | LMGT3 | 97 | (United Kingdom) Grid Motorsport by TF | (Singapore) Martin Berry (United Kingdom) Lorcan Hanafin (United Kingdom) Jonathan Adam | Aston Martin Vantage AMR LMGT3 | G | 107 | +7 Laps |
| 30 | LMGT3 | 50 | (Denmark) Formula Racing | (Denmark) Johnny Laursen (Denmark) Conrad Laursen (Denmark) Nicklas Nielsen | Ferrari 296 LMGT3 | G | 107 | +7 Laps |
| 31 | LMGT3 | 51 | (Italy) AF Corse | (France) Charles-Henri Samani (France) Emmanuel Collard (Argentina) Nicolás Varrone | Ferrari 296 LMGT3 | G | 107 | +7 Laps |
| 32 | LMGT3 | 59 | (Switzerland) Racing Spirit of Léman | (United States) Derek DeBoer (United Kingdom) Casper Stevenson (France) Valentin Hasse-Clot | Aston Martin Vantage AMR LMGT3 | G | 107 | +7 Laps |
| 33 | LMGT3 | 66 | (United Kingdom) JMW Motorsport | (United States) Scott Noble (United States) Jason Hart (United Kingdom) Ben Tuck | Ferrari 296 LMGT3 | G | 107 | +7 Laps |
| 34 | LMGT3 | 85 | (Italy) Iron Dames | (Belgium) Sarah Bovy (Switzerland) Rahel Frey (Denmark) Michelle Gatting | Porsche 911 GT3 R LMGT3 | G | 107 | +7 Laps (Note: The No. 85 Iron Dames was penalised for causing a collision with the No. 60 Proton Competition. The penalty was a drive through converted into 30 seconds time penalty.) |
| 35 | LMGT3 | 86 | (United Kingdom) GR Racing | (United Kingdom) Michael Wainwright (Italy) Riccardo Pera (Italy) Davide Rigon | Ferrari 296 LMGT3 | G | 106 | +8 Laps |
| 36 | LMGT3 | 63 | (Italy) Iron Lynx | (Japan) Hiroshi Hamaguchi (Zimbabwe) Axcil Jefferies (Italy) Andrea Caldarelli | Lamborghini Huracan LMGT3 Evo2 | G | 105 | +9 Laps |
| 37 | LMP2 | 47 | (Switzerland) COOL Racing | (Thailand) Carl Bennett (Austria) Ferdinand Habsburg (Denmark) Frederik Vesti | Oreca 07 | G | 85 | +29 Laps (Note: The No. 47 COOL Racing was penalised for not meeting the minimum driving time by Ferdinand Habsburg. As the penalty 21 laps were deducted from the number of completed by the crew and 1 minute and 31 seconds were added to crew's total race time.) |
Not classified
| | LMP3 | 4 | (Luxembourg) DKR Engineering | (Germany) Alexander Mattschull (United States) Wyatt Brichacek (Portugal) Guilherme Oliveira | Duqueine M30 - D08 | MI | 69 | |
| | LMP3 | 17 | (Switzerland) COOL Racing | (Portugal) Miguel Cristóvão (Switzerland) Cédric Oltramare (Portugal) Manuel Espírito Santo | Ligier JS P320 | MI | 68 | |
| | LMGT3 | 60 | (Germany) Proton Competition | (Italy) Claudio Schiavoni (Italy) Matteo Cressoni (France) Julien Andlauer | Porsche 911 GT3 R LMGT3 | G | 60 | |
| | LMP2 | 28 | (France) IDEC Sport | (Chile) Nicolás Pino (France) Reshad de Gerus (Netherlands) Job van Uitert | Oreca 07 | G | 50 | |
| | LMGT3 | 55 | (Switzerland) Spirit of Race | (United Kingdom) Duncan Cameron (South Africa) David Perel (Republic of Ireland) Matthew Griffin | Ferrari 296 LMGT3 | G | 46 | |
| | LMP2 Pro/Am | 3 | (Luxembourg) DKR Engineering | (Australia) Andres Latorre Canon (Turkey) Cem Bölükbaşı (Germany) Laurents Hörr | Oreca 07 | G | 6 | |

=== Statistics ===
==== Fastest lap ====
| Class | Driver | Team | Time | Lap |
|---|---|---|---|---|
| LMP2 | (Italy) Matteo Cairoli | (Germany) #9 Iron Lynx – Proton | 1:34.882 | 79 |
| LMP2 Pro/Am | (France) Matthieu Vaxivière | (Italy) #83 AF Corse | 1:35.814 | 82 |
| LMP3 | (Colombia) Óscar Tunjo | (Germany) #12 WTM by Rinaldi Racing | 1:44.670 | 77 |
| LMGT3 | (Argentina) Nicolás Varrone | (Italy) #51 AF Corse | 1:47.609 | 87 |
