= Matthias Kaiser =

Liechtenstein racing driver (born 1991)

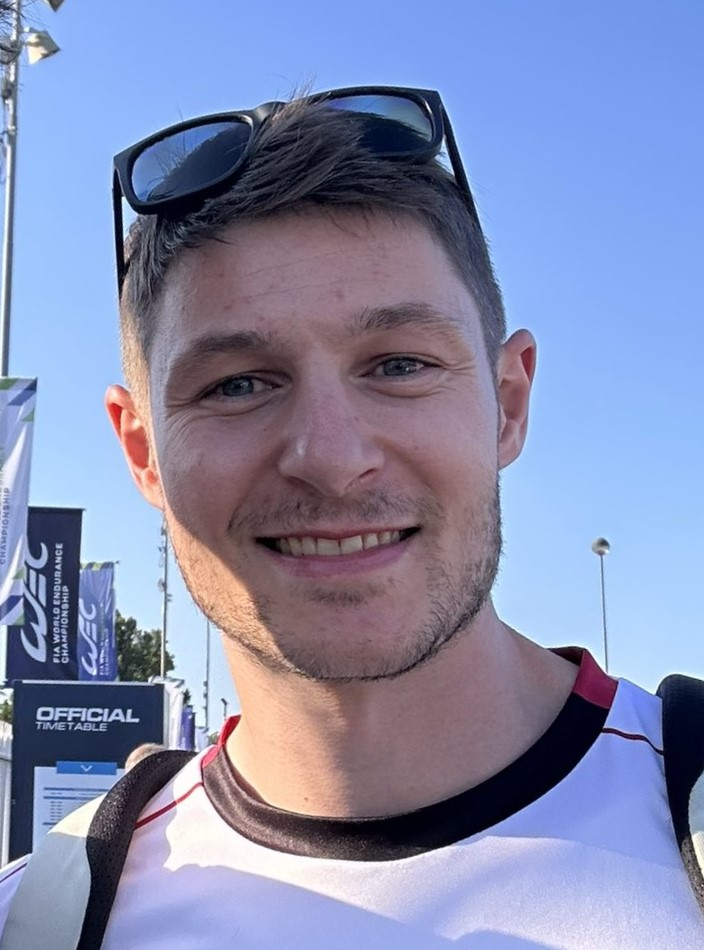
- Kaiser in 2023
- Nationality: (Liechtenstein) Liechtensteiner
- Born: 22 January 1991 (age 35) Gamprin, Liechtenstein

FIA World Endurance Championship career
- Debut season: 2023
- Current team: Vector Sport
- Categorisation: FIA Silver
- Car number: 10
- Starts: 7 (7 entries)
- Wins: 0
- Podiums: 0
- Poles: 0
- Fastest laps: 0
- Best finish: 16th (LMP2) in 2023

Previous series
- 2021–25 2019–20–21 2019–20 2019: European Le Mans Series; Asian Le Mans Series; Michelin Le Mans Cup; Ultimate Cup Series

Championship titles
- 2019: Ultimate Cup Series LMP3

Matthias Kaiser (born 22 January 1991) is a Liechtenstein racing driver currently competing in the European Le Mans Series with Algarve Pro Racing.

Kaiser is the 2019 champion of the Ultimate Cup Series in the Challenge Proto-LMP3 category.

Parallel to his racing commitments, Kaiser is the head of production and technology at Kaiser Premier in the US, having gotten a degree in alternative fuel vehicle technology engineering at the FH Joanneum.

== Career ==
=== Early years ===
Kaiser began his racing journey in the Porsche Super Sports Cup Germany in 2014. He finished second in 2015 before winning the 911 GT3 Cup class title in 2016 and 2017. During the latter year, Kaiser also contested the Touring Car Endurance Series in the TCR category, where he and full-time teammate Felix Wimmer finished the season fourth in the standings. The following year would see Kaiser switch to LMP3 prototypes, as he would race in the V de V Endurance Series. With two race victories the Liechtensteiner won the championship for Wimmer Werk Motorsport, beating two-time champion Jakub Śmiechowski amongst others. In 2019, Kaiser returned to the now rebranded Ultimate Cup Series with Wimmer Werk, where four wins from six races earned him the championship. Additionally, he made his first foray into the Michelin Le Mans Cup, competing at the Road to Le Mans event for Graff Racing alongside Sébastien Page.

=== LMP3 seasons & LMP2 debut ===
Kaiser drove for Graff in two races of the Asian Le Mans Series at the beginning of 2020, scoring a podium in Thailand, before embarking on a campaign in the MLMC together with Rory Penttinen, driving a Ligier JS P320 in LMP3. With three podiums, which included a second place at Le Castellet, the pair finished third in the standings. They would lose out on a maiden race win at the season finale despite crossing the finish line first, being demoted to seventh for failing to serve a drive-through penalty.

During the 2021 winter, Kaiser made his debut in the LMP2 category, driving an Oreca 07 in the AsLMS for Phoenix Racing as the team's bronze-ranked driver. With three third-place finishes, Kaiser and Simon Trummer, his only full-time teammate, finished fourth overall in a field containing five cars. Kaiser's focus during the regular season shifted towards the European Le Mans Series, which he contested with Graff, once again partnering Penttinen in LMP3. After struggling during the first few races, Kaiser and Penttinen took points three times and finished on the podium at the final round in Portimão, which led them to ninth in the teams' standings – four places below the sister Graff car.

=== LMP2 full-time ===
For 2022, Kaiser stepped up to contest the ELMS in the LMP2 category after being upgraded to a silver ranking by the FIA, driving together with Thomas Laurent and Ugo de Wilde at Mühlner Motorsport. With a season-best third place which came from a strategic gamble at Monza, the team finished 11th in the standings, having retired from the final two races, including due to a crash caused by Kaiser in Portugal.

The Liechtensteiner stepped into the FIA World Endurance Championship ahead of 2023, partnering Gabriel Aubry and fellow silver Ryan Cullen at Vector Sport. The team finished tenth in the standings due to a number of technical issues, but scored their best finish at the 24 Hours of Le Mans with seventh place in the LMP2 class. After the category was removed from the WEC, Kaiser moved back to the ELMS in 2024, partnering Alex Lynn and Olli Caldwell at Algarve Pro Racing. The trio scored two podiums, second at Barcelona and Mugello, and finished fifth in the standings.

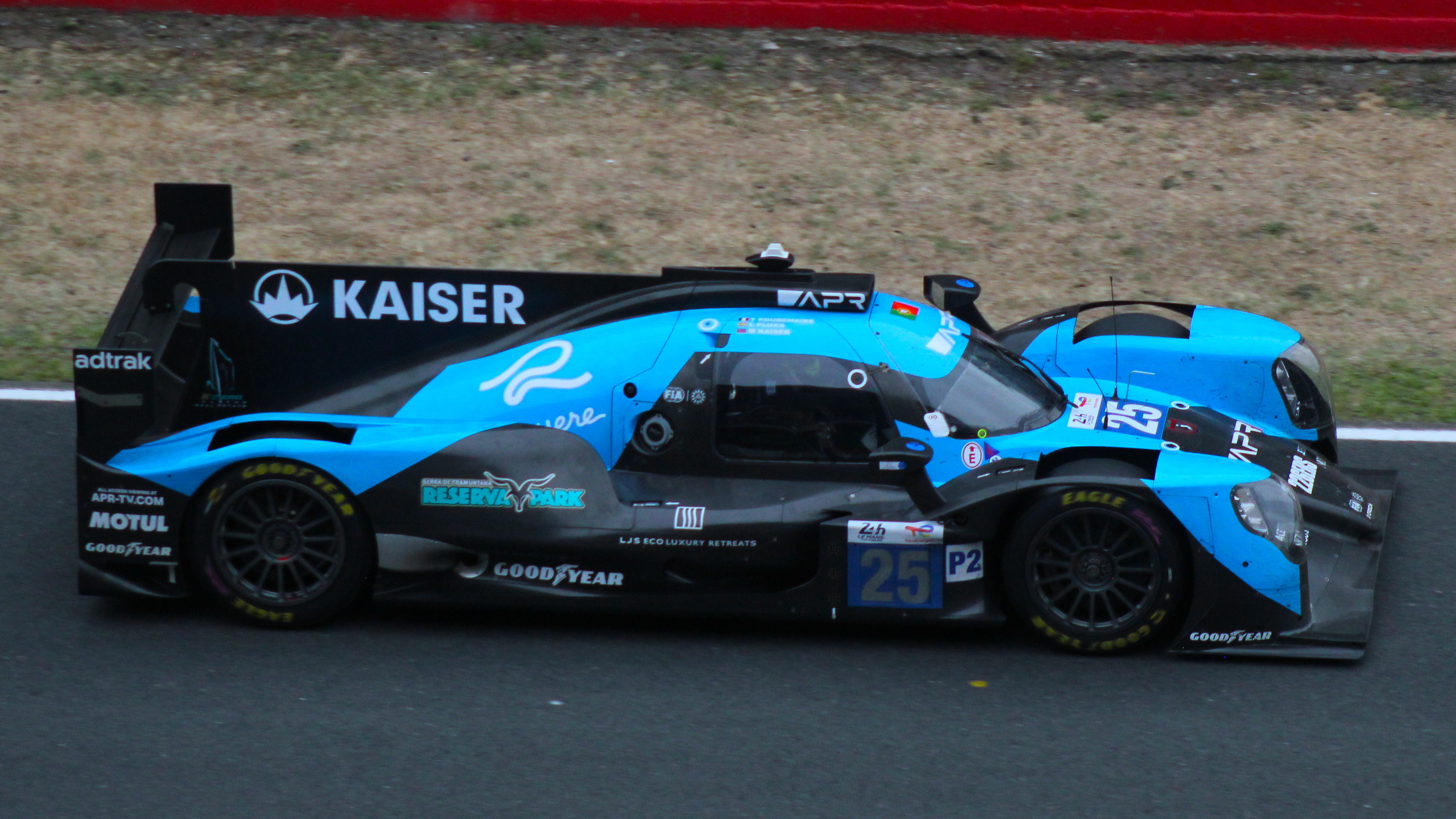
Kaiser's No. 25 car at the 2025 24 Hours of Le Mans

Kaiser remained at Algarve Pro for the 2025 ELMS season, being joined by Théo Pourchaire and Lorenzo Fluxá. Sixth at Barcelona was followed by 14th in Le Castellet, a race which Kaiser had led early on owing to the correct tyre strategy. In Imola meanwhile, Pourchaire qualified on pole and led the team to a third place at the flag, with Algarve Pro benefiting from a late penalty to the Iron Lynx car. The team missed out on another podium at Spa, as they received a three-minute stop-and-go penalty for entering a closed pit lane during a FCY period. Kaiser and his teammates took fifth at Silverstone and retired from the Portimão finale, thus ending up seventh in the teams' standings.

== Racing record ==
=== Racing career summary ===
Season	Series	Team	Races	Wins	Poles	F/Laps	Podiums	Points	Position
2014	Porsche Super Sports Cup - 5c		?	?	?	?	?	?	?
2015	Porsche Super Sports Cup - 911 GT3 Cup	Team FMT	?	?	?	?	?	?	**2nd**
2015	Porsche Sports Cup Endurance	Team FMT	12					213.5	**2nd**
2016	Porsche Super Sports Cup - 911 GT3 Cup	Team FMT	?	?	?	?	?	?	**1st**
2017	Porsche Super Sports Cup - 911 GT3 Cup	Team FMT	24	12	?	?	22	235.4	**1st**
2017	Touring Car Endurance Series - TCR	Wimmer Werk Motorsport	4	0	0	0	1	24	4th
2018	V de V Endurance Series - LMP3	Wimmer Werk Motorsport	7	2	0	0	4	201	**1st**
2018	VLN Endurance	Wimmer Werk Motorsport	2	0	0	0	0	0	NC†
2019	Ultimate Cup Series - Challenge Proto - LMP3	Wimmer Werk Motorsport	6	4	5	0	5	192	**1st**
2019	Le Mans Cup - LMP3	Graff	2	0	0	0	0	0	NC†
2019	24 Hours of Nürburgring - V5	QTQ-Raceperformance Florian Quante	1	0	0	0	0	N/A	4th
2019	VLN Series - V4	Team AVIA Sorg Rennsport	3	0	0	0	0	8.54	71st
2019	VLN Series - V5	N/A	1	0	0	0	0	0	NC†
2019–20	Asian Le Mans Series - LMP3	Graff Racing	2	0	0	0	1	21	9th
2020	Le Mans Cup - LMP3	Graff	7	0	0	0	3	70.5	4th
2021	Asian Le Mans Series - LMP2	Phoenix Racing	4	0	0	0	3	57	4th
2021	European Le Mans Series - LMP3	Graff Racing	6	0	0	0	1	24.5	14th
2022	European Le Mans Series - LMP2	Mühlner Motorsport	6	0	0	0	1	19	15th
2023	FIA World Endurance Championship - LMP2	Vector Sport	7	0	0	0	0	29	16th
2023	24 Hours of Le Mans - LMP2	Vector Sport	1	0	0	0	0	N/A	7th
2024	European Le Mans Series - LMP2	Algarve Pro Racing	6	0	0	0	2	50	5th
2024	24 Hours of Le Mans - LMP2	Algarve Pro Racing	1	0	0	0	0	N/A	8th
2025	European Le Mans Series - LMP2	Algarve Pro Racing	6	0	0	0	1	40	7th
2025	24 Hours of Le Mans - LMP2	Algarve Pro Racing	1	0	0	0	0	N/A	8th
2025–26	Asian Le Mans Series - LMP2	Algarve Pro Racing	6	0	0	0	2	45	6th
2026	European Le Mans Series - LMP2	Algarve Pro Racing	6	1	0	0	2	62	4th

^{†} As Kaiser was a guest driver, he was ineligible to score points.
^{*} Season still in progress.

=== Complete Ultimate Cup Series results ===
(key) (Races in bold indicate pole position; results in italics indicate fastest lap)

Year	Entrant	Class	Chassis	Engine	1	2	3	4	5	6	7	Rank	Points
2019	Wimmer Werk Motorsport	LMP3	Ligier JS P3	Nissan VK56DE 5.6L V8	**EST**; 1	**DIJ**; 4	SLR; 1	**MUG**; 1	VAL	**MAG**; 1	**LEC**; 3	1st	192

=== Complete Le Mans Cup results ===
(key) (Races in bold indicate pole position; results in italics indicate fastest lap)

Year	Entrant	Class	Chassis	Engine	1	2	3	4	5	6	7	Rank	Points
2019	Graff	LMP3	Norma M30	Nissan VK56DE 5.6L V8	LEC	MNZ	LMS; 1; 12	LMS; 2; 13	CAT	SPA	ALG	NC	0
2020	Graff	LMP3	Ligier JS P320	Nissan VK56DE 5.6L V8	LEC1; 3	SPA; 5	LEC2; 2	LMS; 1; 13	LMS; 2; 5	MNZ; 3	ALG; 7	4th	70.5

=== Complete European Le Mans Series results ===
(key) (Races in bold indicate pole position; results in italics indicate fastest lap)

Year	Entrant	Class	Chassis	Engine	1	2	3	4	5	6	Rank	Points
2021	Graff Racing	LMP3	Ligier JS P320	Nissan VK56DE 5.6L V8	CAT; 14	RBR; 12	LEC; 9	MNZ; 14	SPA; 7	ALG; 3	14th	24.5
2022	Mühlner Motorsport	LMP2	Oreca 07	Gibson GK428 V8	LEC; 9	IMO; 11	MNZ; 3	CAT; 9	SPA; Ret	ALG; Ret	15th	19
2024	Algarve Pro Racing	LMP2	Oreca 07	Gibson GK428 4.2 L V8	CAT; 2	LEC; 7	IMO; 8	SPA; 14	MUG; 2	ALG; 8	5th	50
2025	Algarve Pro Racing	LMP2	Oreca 07	Gibson GK428 4.2 L V8	CAT; 5	LEC; 8	**IMO**; 3	SPA; 12	SIL; 5	ALG; Ret	7th	40
2026	Algarve Pro Racing	LMP2	Oreca 07	Gibson GK428 4.2 L V8	CAT; 9	LEC; 9	IMO; 3	SPA; 5	SIL; 1	ALG; 6	4th	62

=== Complete FIA World Endurance Championship results ===
(key) (Races in bold indicate pole position) (Races in italics indicate fastest lap)

Year	Entrant	Class	Car	Engine	1	2	3	4	5	6	7	Rank	Points
2023	Vector Sport	LMP2	Oreca 07	Gibson GK428 4.2 L V8	SEB; 9	PRT; 11	SPA; Ret	LMS; 5	MNZ; Ret	FUJ; 7	BHR; NC	16th	29

=== Complete 24 Hours of Le Mans results ===
Year	Team	Co-Drivers	Car	Class	Laps	Pos.	Class Pos.
2023	(United Kingdom) Vector Sport	(France) Gabriel Aubry (Republic of Ireland) Ryan Cullen	Oreca 07-Gibson	LMP2	325	15th	7th
2024	(Portugal) Algarve Pro Racing	(United Kingdom) Olli Caldwell (Canada) Roman De Angelis	Oreca 07-Gibson	LMP2	294	22nd	8th
2025	(Portugal) Algarve Pro Racing	(Spain) Lorenzo Fluxá (France) Théo Pourchaire	Oreca 07-Gibson	LMP2	364	25th	8th

=== Complete Asian Le Mans Series results ===
(key) (Races in bold indicate pole position) (Races in italics indicate fastest lap)

Year	Team	Class	Car	Engine	1	2	3	4	5	6	Pos.	Points
2025–26	Algarve Pro Racing	LMP2	Oreca 07	Gibson GK428 4.2 L V8	SEP; 1; 13	SEP; 2; 13	DUB; 1; 13	DUB; 2; 3	ABU; 1; 2	ABU; 2; 4	6th	45
