= IDEC Sport Racing =

French racing team

(France) IDEC Sport Racing
- Founded: 2015
- Founder(s): Patrice Lafargue
- Base: Signes, Var, France
- Team principal(s): Patrice Lafargue (president); Nicolas Minassian (sporting director)
- Current series: European Le Mans Series; Le Mans Cup
- Former series: V de V Challenge; 24H Series; IMSA SportsCar Championship
- Current drivers: European Le Mans Series: 18. (United Kingdom) Jamie Chadwick (Germany) Laurents Hörr (Italy) Valerio Rinicella; 28. (France) Paul-Loup Chatin (France) Paul Lafargue (Netherlands) Job van Uitert; Le Mans Cup: 17. (France) Patrice Lafargue (France) Dino Lunardi
- Website: https://www.idecsport.com/en/category/car-racing/

IDEC Sport Racing, more commonly referred to as IDEC Sport, is a French sports car racing outfit. Born from the ashes of Ruffier Racing in 2015, the team began racing GT3 cars in the 24H Series before moving on to sports prototypes. Spearheaded by LMP2 ace Paul-Loup Chatin for much of its history, IDEC won the 2019 European Le Mans Series title and has twice set class pole position at the 24 Hours of Le Mans, in 2018 and 2023. It is currently active in both the ELMS in LMP2 and the Michelin Le Mans Cup in LMP3.

The team is led by Patrice Lafargue, founder and CEO of the IDEC Group, a real estate construction company also known for its sponsorship of sailing trimarans. Former Peugeot factory driver Nicolas Minassian joined him in 2018 as sporting director. Although IDEC's corporate colour is red, it has borne the colours of classic French brands Delage and Matra, and most recently collaborated with Genesis Magma Racing's LMDh programme.

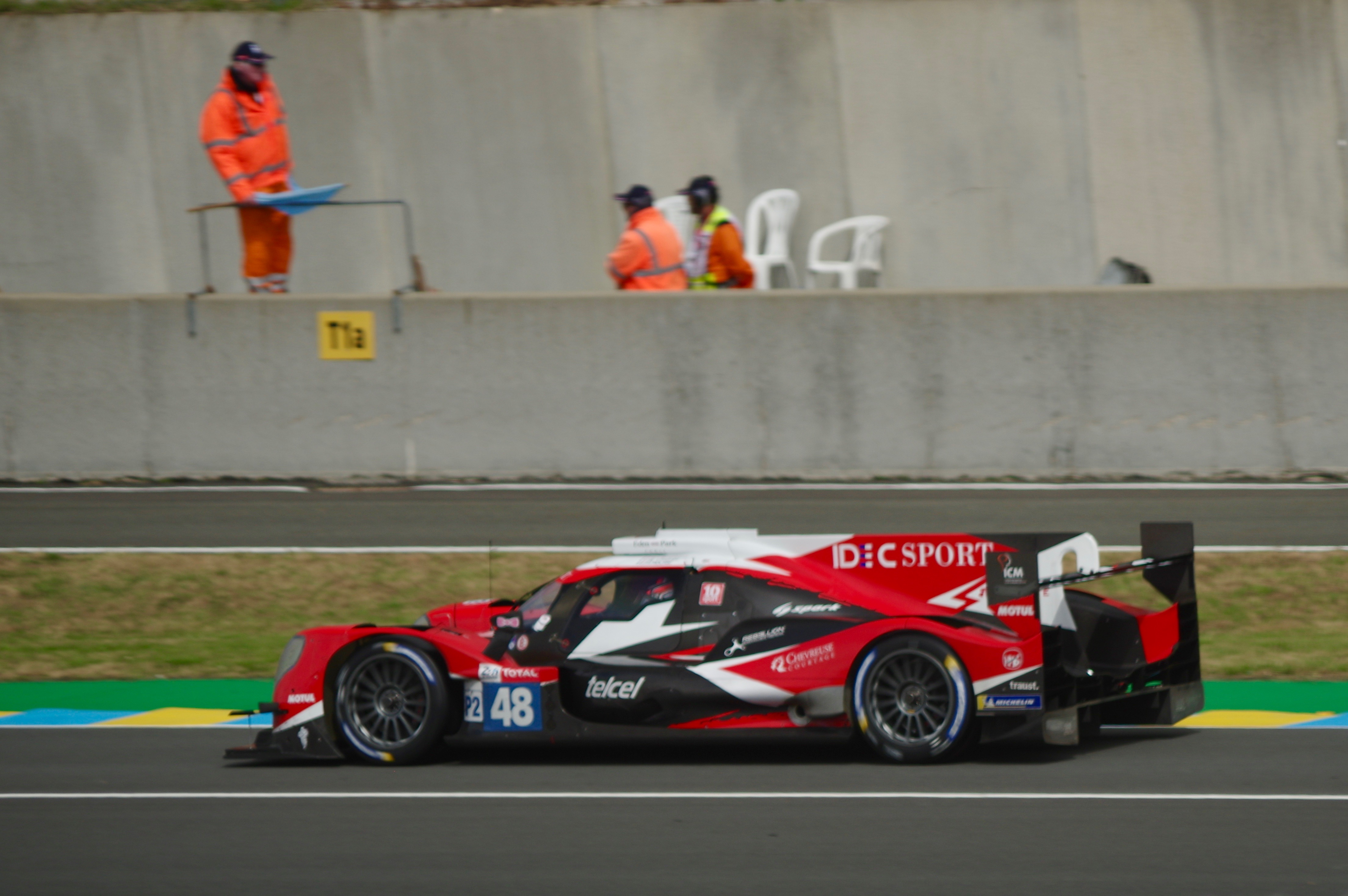
IDEC Sport at the 24 Hours of Le Mans in 2019, the year the team won the European Le Mans Series.

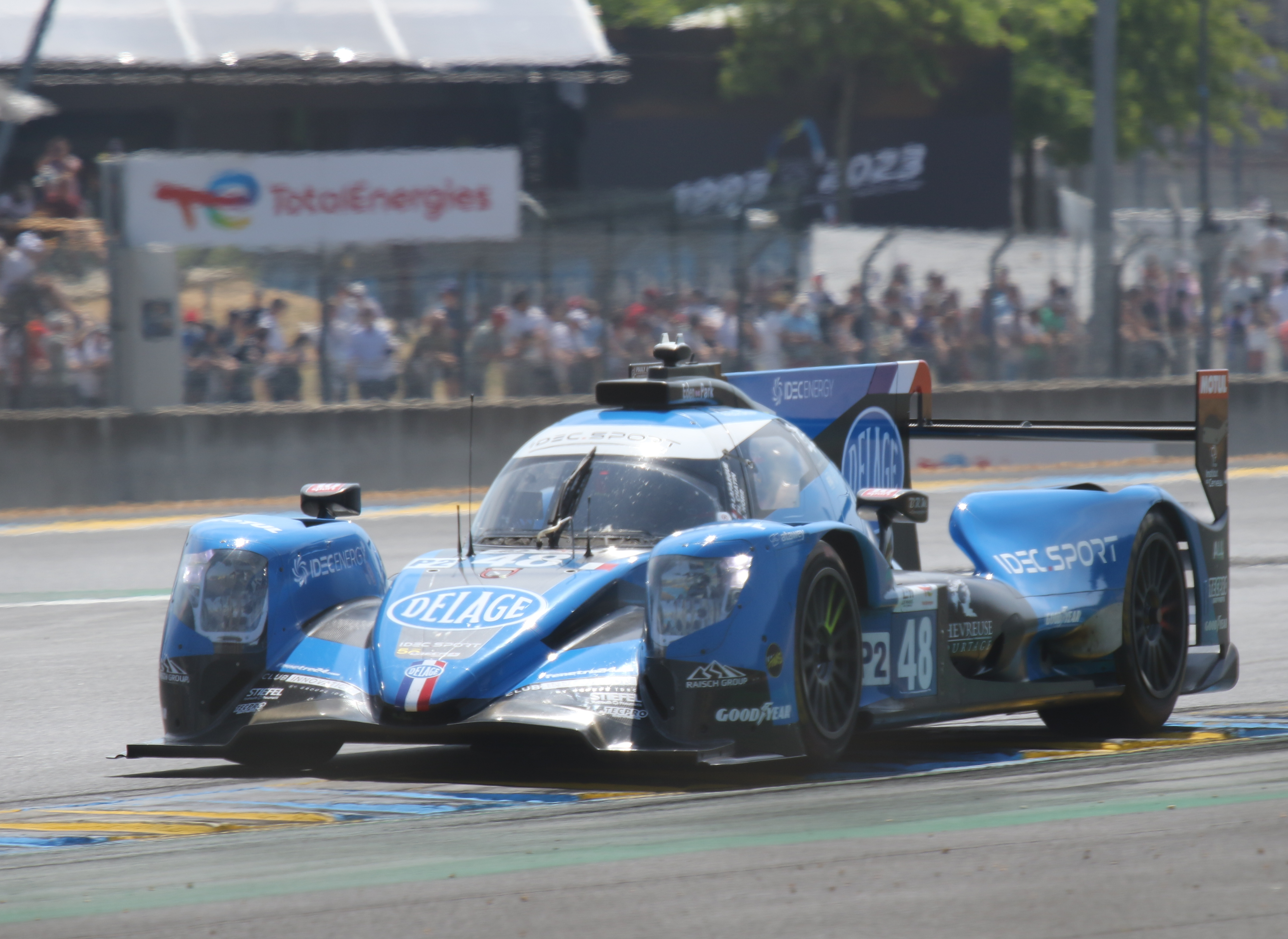
IDEC Sport's Delage-backed Oreca 07 at the 2023 24 Hours of Le Mans.

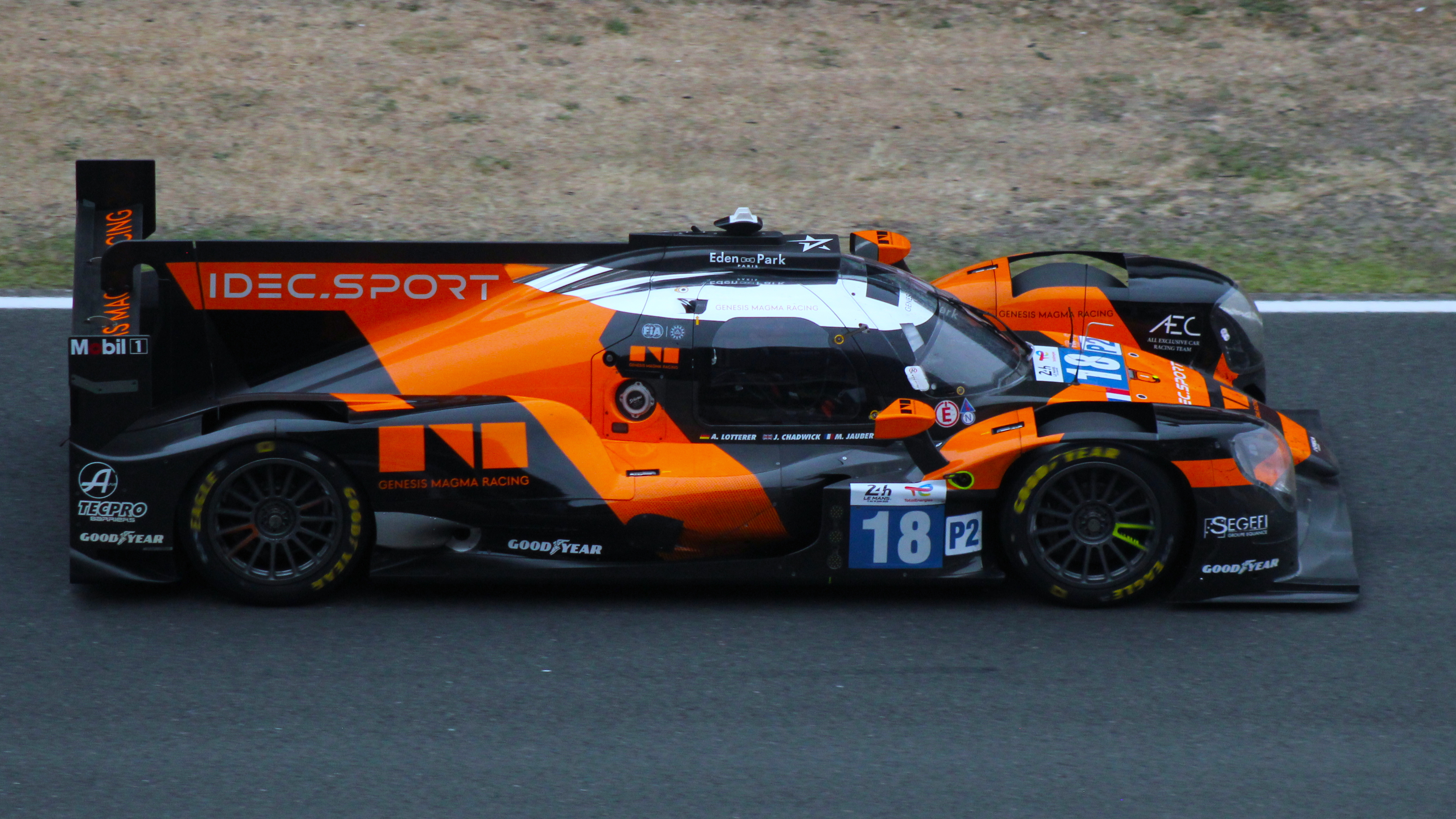
IDEC Sport's Genesis Magma Racing-backed Oreca 07 at the 2025 24 Hours of Le Mans.

== Racing record ==
=== 24 Hours of Le Mans results ===
Year	Entrant	No.	Car	Drivers	Class	Laps	Pos.	Class Pos.
2017	(France) IDEC Sport Racing	17	Ligier JS P217-Gibson	(France) Patrice Lafargue (France) Paul Lafargue (France) David Zollinger	LMP2	344	12th	10th
2018	(France) IDEC Sport	48	Oreca 07-Gibson	(France) Paul-Loup Chatin (France) Paul Lafargue (Mexico) Memo Rojas	LMP2	312	DNF	DNF
2019	(France) IDEC Sport	48	Oreca 07-Gibson	(France) Paul-Loup Chatin (France) Paul Lafargue (Mexico) Memo Rojas	LMP2	364	10th	5th
2020	(France) IDEC Sport	17	Oreca 07-Gibson	(United Kingdom) Jonathan Kennard (France) Patrick Pilet (Note: Pilet was drafted in as a late replacement for Dwight Merriman, who sustained a back injury after crashing heavily at the Porsche Curves in practice.) (United Kingdom) Kyle Tilley	LMP2	363	15th	11th
2020	(France) IDEC Sport	28	Oreca 07-Gibson	(United Kingdom) Richard Bradley (France) Paul-Loup Chatin (France) Paul Lafargue	LMP2	366	10th	6th
2021	(France) IDEC Sport	17	Oreca 07-Gibson	(United Kingdom) Ryan Dalziel (France) Thomas Laurent (United States) Dwight Merriman	LMP2 (Pro-Am)	0	WD	WD
2021	(France) IDEC Sport	48	Oreca 07-Gibson	(France) Paul-Loup Chatin (France) Paul Lafargue (France) Patrick Pilet	LMP2	359	11th	6th
2022	(France) IDEC Sport	48	Oreca 07-Gibson	(France) Paul-Loup Chatin (France) Paul Lafargue (France) Patrick Pilet	LMP2	366	12th	8th
2023	(France) IDEC Sport	48	Oreca 07-Gibson	(France) Paul-Loup Chatin (Germany) Laurents Hörr (France) Paul Lafargue	LMP2	327	14th	6th
2024	(France) IDEC Sport	28	Oreca 07-Gibson	(France) Reshad de Gerus (France) Paul Lafargue (Netherlands) Job van Uitert	LMP2	297	17th	3rd
2025	(France) IDEC Sport	18	Oreca 07-Gibson	(United Kingdom) Jamie Chadwick (France) Mathys Jaubert (Germany) André Lotterer	LMP2	206	DNF	DNF
2025	(France) IDEC Sport	28	Oreca 07-Gibson	(Mexico) Sebastián Álvarez (France) Paul Lafargue (Netherlands) Job van Uitert	LMP2	308	DNF	DNF
2026	(France) IDEC Sport	28	Oreca 07-Gibson	(France) Paul Lafargue (Italy) Valerio Rinicella (Netherlands) Job van Uitert	LMP2	359	20th	6th

=== European Le Mans Series ===
Year	Entrant	Class	Chassis	Engine	No	Drivers	1	2	3	4	5	6	Pos.	Pts
2016	(France) IDEC Sport Racing	LMP2	Ligier JS P2	Judd HK 3.6 L V8	28	(France) Dimitri Enjalbert (France) Patrice Lafargue (France) Paul Lafargue	SIL; 7	IMO; Ret	RBR	LEC; 10	SPA; 8	EST; 6	10th	19
2017	(France) IDEC Sport Racing	LMP2	Ligier JS P217	Gibson GK428 4.2L V8	28	(France) Patrice Lafargue (France) Paul Lafargue (France) David Zollinger 1 (France) Olivier Pla 2–4 (France) Paul-Loup Chatin 5–6	SIL; 8	MNZ; 9	RBR; Ret	LEC; 11	SPA; 10	ALG; 9	12th	8.5
2018	(France) IDEC Sport	LMP2	Ligier JS P217	Gibson GK428 4.2L V8	27	(France) Erik Maris 1–3, 5 (France) Patrice Lafargue 1–3 (France) William Cavailhes 1–2 (France) Nicolas Minassian 3, 5 (France) Aurélien Panis 5	LEC; Ret	MNZ; 12	RBR; 16	SIL	SPA; 14‡	ALG	19th	1.25
2018	(France) IDEC Sport	LMP2	Oreca 07	Gibson GK428 4.2L V8	28	(France) Paul-Loup Chatin (Mexico) Memo Rojas (France) Paul Lafargue 1–4 (France) Gabriel Aubry 5–6	LEC; 7	MNZ; 3	RBR; 4	SIL; 3	SPA; 4‡	ALG; 6	3rd	64
2019	(France) IDEC Sport	LMP2	Ligier JS P217	Gibson GK428 4.2L V8	27	(France) Stéphane Adler (France) Erik Maris 1–2, 5 (France) Patrice Lafargue 1–2, 4, 6 (France) Nicolas Minassian 3 (France) William Cavailhes 3–6	LEC; Ret	MNZ; 16	CAT; 14	SIL; 13	SPA; Ret	ALG; 13	18th	2
2019	(France) IDEC Sport	LMP2	Oreca 07	Gibson GK428 4.2L V8	28	(France) Paul-Loup Chatin (France) Paul Lafargue (Mexico) Memo Rojas	LEC; 2	MNZ; 2	CAT; 5	SIL; 1	SPA; 6	ALG; 1	1st	105
2020	(France) IDEC Sport	LMP2	Oreca 07	Gibson GK428 4.2L V8	28	(United Kingdom) Richard Bradley (France) Paul Lafargue (France) Paul-Loup Chatin 1–3, 5 (France) Nicolas Minassian 4	LEC; Ret	SPA; 7	LEC; 7	MNZ; 6	ALG; 10		9th	21
2021	(France) IDEC Sport	LMP2	Oreca 07	Gibson GK428 4.2L V8	17	(United States) Dwight Merriman (United Kingdom) Kyle Tilley (United Kingdom) Ryan Dalziel 1–2, 4 (France) Gabriel Aubry 3	CAT; 12	RBR; 11	LEC; 15	MNZ; 15	SPA	ALG	15th	2
2021	(France) IDEC Sport	LMP2	Oreca 07	Gibson GK428 4.2L V8	28	(France) Paul-Loup Chatin (France) Paul Lafargue (France) Patrick Pilet 1–2, 4–6 (France) Jean-Éric Vergne 3	CAT; 8	RBR; 6	LEC; 9	MNZ; 9	SPA; 6	ALG; 6	7th	32
2022	(France) IDEC Sport	LMP2	Oreca 07	Gibson GK428 4.2L V8	28	(France) Paul-Loup Chatin (France) Paul Lafargue (France) Patrick Pilet	LEC; 4	IMO; 5	MNZ; 1	CAT; 13	SPA; Ret	ALG; 7	5th	53
2023	(France) IDEC Sport	LMP2	Oreca 07	Gibson GK428 4.2L V8	28	(France) Paul-Loup Chatin (Germany) Laurents Hörr (France) Paul Lafargue	CAT; 3	LEC; 5	ARA; 2	SPA; 4	POR; 7	ALG; 6	5th	72
2024	(France) IDEC Sport	LMP2	Oreca 07	Gibson GK428 4.2L V8	28	(France) Reshad de Gerus (Netherlands) Job van Uitert (France) Paul Lafargue 1–2 (Argentina) Marcos Siebert 3–4 (Chile) Nico Pino 5–6	CAT; 4	LEC; 4	IMO; 5	SPA; 3	MUG; Ret	ALG; 13	6th	50
2025	(France) IDEC Sport	LMP2	Oreca 07	Gibson GK428 4.2L V8	18	(United Kingdom) Jamie Chadwick (France) Mathys Jaubert (Spain) Daniel Juncadella	CAT; 1	LEC; 1	IMO; 11	SPA; 11	SIL; 1	ALG; 3	3rd	90
2025	(France) IDEC Sport	LMP2	Oreca 07	Gibson GK428 4.2L V8	28	(France) Paul-Loup Chatin (France) Paul Lafargue (Netherlands) Job van Uitert	CAT; 8	LEC; 11	IMO; Ret	SPA; 4	SIL; 4	ALG; 4	8th	40
2026*	(France) IDEC Sport	LMP2	Oreca 07	Gibson GK428 4.2L V8	28	(United Kingdom) Jamie Chadwick (Germany) Laurents Hörr (Italy) Valerio Rinicella	CAT; 4	LEC	IMO	SPA	SIL	ALG	4th*	12*
2026*	(France) IDEC Sport	LMP2	Oreca 07	Gibson GK428 4.2L V8	28	(France) Paul-Loup Chatin (France) Paul Lafargue (Netherlands) Job van Uitert	CAT; 10	LEC	IMO	SPA	SIL	ALG	10th*	1*

* Season still in progress.
