= Ryan Cullen =

Irish racing driver (born 1991)

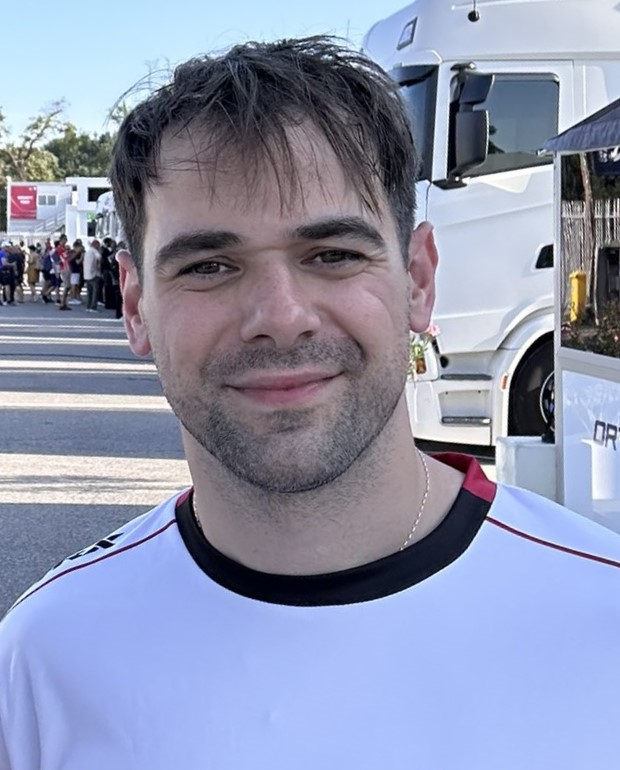
- Cullen in 2023
- Nationality: (Republic of Ireland) Irish
- Born: 26 March 1991 (age 35) Somerset, United Kingdom

FIA World Endurance Championship career
- Debut season: 2019–20
- Current team: Vector Sport
- Categorisation: FIA Silver
- Car number: 10
- Former teams: Jackie Chan DC Racing
- Starts: 14 (14 entries)
- Wins: 0
- Podiums: 1
- Poles: 0
- Fastest laps: 0
- Best finish: 14th (LMP2) in 2022

Previous series
- 2018–20 2016–17 2015–17 2015 2013–14 2013 2012: European Le Mans Series; Porsche Carrera Cup Germany; Porsche Supercup; Porsche Carrera Cup Great Britain; GP3 Series; Toyota Racing Series; British Formula Ford

Championship titles
- 2016–17: Porsche GT3 Cup Challenge ME

Ryan Cullen (born 26 March 1991) is an Irish racing driver currently competing in the European Le Mans Series for Vector Sport.

== Early career ==
Cullen first drove in the British Formula Ford in 2012 as a novice driver which means a driver has no race experience as stated in the MSA regulations, placing sixth overall in the standings and obtaining three podium positions. After partaking in the post-season GP3 test, Cullen signed with Marussia Manor Racing to compete in the GP3 Series in 2013. He failed to score points all year, finishing 29th in the standings, having been beaten by both teammates in all qualifying sessions and races where each driver was classified. During the winter, Cullen drove in the MRF Challenge Formula 2000 Championship and finished sixth overall.

Cullen stayed with Marussia Manor for the 2014 GP3 season. Following seven scoreless weekends from Cullen, the team withdrew due to financial troubles, meaning that Cullen would miss the round at Sochi. He returned for the season finale with Trident Racing, but was unable to prevent himself from going a second successive season without scoring. Cullen drove for Koiranen GP during the post-season test.

Cullen went back to the MRF series for 2014/2015, where he finished second with three victories, four pole positions and six fastest laps.

== Sportscar career ==
=== Porsche series ===
In 2015, Cullen performed double-duties, partaking in the Porsche Carrera Cup Great Britain with G-Cat Racing whilst also racing for VERVA Lechner Racing Team in the Porsche Supercup from round 4 onwards. He scored a best race finish of eighth in the former and 12th in the latter.

After finishing third in the Porsche GT3 Cup Challenge Middle East during the off-season, Cullen returned to the Porsche Supercup with Lechner Racing whilst also competing in the Porsche Carrera Cup Germany at Konrad Motorsport. In the latter, Cullen finished tenth in the standings, being beaten by all full-time drivers, meanwhile he classified 11th in the Supercup with a best result of seventh at the Red Bull Ring.

For his third season in the Porsche world, Cullen remained with Lechner in the Supercup, but switched to Huber Racing in the PCCG. He would end up 11th again in the former, whilst improving to ninth place in the latter's standings.

=== LMP2 venture ===
Cullen switched to prototype racing in 2018/19, driving in the LMP2 class of the European Le Mans Series for APR - Rebellion Racing alongside Gustavo Menezes and Harrison Newey. The team ended up ninth in the standings, having finished all six races.

At the start of 2019, Cullen took his maiden endurance racing victory in the 24 Hours of Daytona, having driven for DragonSpeed together with Pastor Maldonado, Roberto González, and Sebastián Saavedra. For the main 2019 season, he remained in the ELMS, this time partnering Alex Brundle and Will Owen at United Autosports. Cullen and his teammates scored their first podium of the year at Monza, finishing third, but were unable to match the results of the sister car, finishing eighth in the teams' championship. Cullen made his 24 Hours of Le Mans debut the same year, finishing 14th in class.

Without a full-time programme in the COVID-stricken 2020 campaign, Cullen had to make do with one-off appearances. He raced in two races of the ELMS with DragonSpeed, drove for Jackie Chan DC Racing at the 6 Hours of Spa-Francorchamps, and competed at Le Mans for G-Drive Racing.

Cullen underwent another patchy season during 2021, as he raced in two events of the FIA World Endurance Championship with Risi Competizione, which included another appearance in Le Mans - where he and his teammates retired due to engine troubles.

The following year saw Cullen step into the WEC for the entire season, as he drove with new team Vector Sport in the LMP2 category. Despite scoring a podium at Monza, Cullen and the team struggled, ending up tenth and second-lowest of the Pro class entries in the standings.

Returning for the team's second season in the category, Cullen partnered Gabriel Aubry as well as fellow silver-ranked driver Matthias Kaiser for the 2023 WEC season. With numerous technical issues and a collision at Monza, Vector Sport finished tenth overall, once again ranking second-lowest. However, a strong drive by Aubry carried the team towards a seventh place in class at Le Mans.

With the dropping of LMP2 from the WEC after 2023, Cullen returned to drive for Vector in the 2024 European Le Mans Series. Partnering Felipe Drugovich and Stéphane Richelmi, the Irishman finished 14th in the drivers' standings. Of note was a collision he caused at Barcelona, where an overly ambitious overtaking attempt led to him spinning Alex García into the gravel, and a self-induced spin at Imola — though the team recovered well and finished the race in third. He finished fourth in class at Le Mans, having been partnered by Richelmi and Patrick Pilet. Cullen remained at Vector for the 2025 ELMS season, where he drove alongside Pietro Fittipaldi and Vladislav Lomko. The trio began well in Barcelona, finishing fourth overall and taking third in the Pro category. Fourth in Pro at the next round in Le Castellet preceded 12th place in Imola, a race where the Vector car was turned around late by Tom Dillmann. Points in Spa came next, before Cullen and his teammates completed a tidy race at a rainy Silverstone to claim third overall. By finishing seventh at Portimão, Cullen and his teammates ended up fourth in the standings.

Cullen, Fittipaldi, and Lomko remained at Vector Sport for the 2026 season.

== Personal life ==
Cullen was born to an Irish father and a Cypriot mother. He was coached by Adam Carroll during his early years in car racing.

== Racing record ==
=== Racing career summary ===
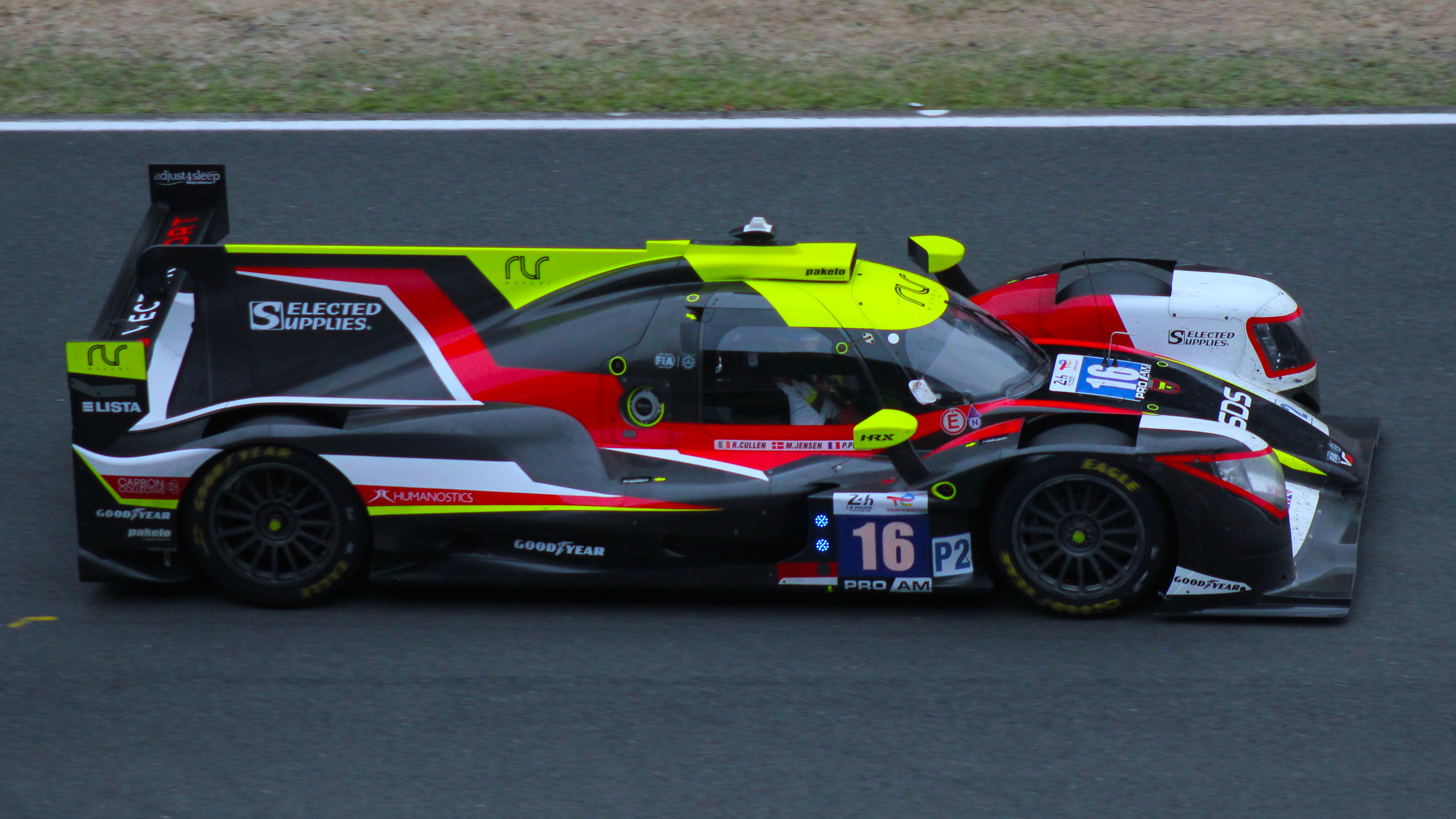
Cullen's No. 16 car at the 2025 24 Hours of Le Mans

Season	Series	Team	Races	Wins	Poles	F/Laps	Podiums	Points	Position
2012	British Formula Ford Championship	Race Car Consultants	23	0	0	0	3	340	5th
2012	Formula Renault BARC Championship	Cullen Motorsport	2	0	0	0	0	5	
2012	Formula Renault BARC Winter Series	Cullen Motorsport	2	0	0	0	0	30	12th
2013	GP3 Series	Marussia Manor Racing	16	0	0	0	0	0	29th
2013–14	MRF Challenge Formula 2000 Championship	MRF Racing	13	0	0	0	0	45	8th
2014	GP3 Series	Marussia Manor Racing	14	0	0	0	0	0	25th
2014	GP3 Series	Trident	2	0	0	0	0	0	25th
2014–15	MRF Challenge Formula 2000 Championship	MRF Racing	12	3	4	4	6	174	**2nd**
2015	Porsche Carrera Cup Great Britain	G-Cat Racing	4	0	0	0	0	40	14th
2015	Porsche Supercup	VERVA Lechner Racing Team	7	0	0	0	0	10	18th
2015–16	Porsche GT3 Cup Challenge Middle East	Cullen Motorsport	12	2	0	3	7	235	**3rd**
2016	Porsche Supercup	Lechner Racing Middle East	10	0	0	0	0	45	10th
2016	Porsche Carrera Cup Germany - Class A	Konrad Motorsport	12	0	0	0	0	91	9th
2016	Lamborghini Super Trofeo Europe - Pro	Konrad Motorsport	3	0	0	0	0	17	12th
2016–17	Porsche GT3 Cup Challenge Middle East	Cullen Motorsport	12	8	4	2	11	265	**1st**
2017	Porsche Supercup	Walter Lechner Racing Team	9	0	0	0	0	41	11th
2017	Porsche Supercup	Lechner Racing Middle East	2	0	0	0	0	41	11th
2017	Porsche Carrera Cup Germany	raceunion Huber Racing	13	0	0	0	0	73	10th
2018	European Le Mans Series - LMP2	APR - Rebellion Racing	6	0	0	0	0	23.25	12th
2019	European Le Mans Series - LMP2	United Autosports	6	0	0	0	1	37.5	12th
2019	IMSA SportsCar Championship - LMP2	DragonSpeed	1	1	0	0	1	35	8th
2019	24 Hours of Le Mans - LMP2	United Autosports	1	0	0	0	0	N/A	14th
2019–20	FIA World Endurance Championship - LMP2	Jackie Chan DC Racing	1	0	0	0	0	8	16th
2020	European Le Mans Series - LMP2	DragonSpeed USA	2	0	0	0	0	4.5	24th
2020	24 Hours of Le Mans - LMP2	G-Drive Racing by Algarve	1	0	0	0	0	N/A	DNF
2021	FIA World Endurance Championship - LMP2	Risi Competizione	2	0	0	0	0	0	NC†
2021	24 Hours of Le Mans - LMP2	Risi Competizione	1	0	0	0	0	N/A	DNF
2022	FIA World Endurance Championship - LMP2	Vector Sport	6	0	0	0	1	21	14th
2022	24 Hours of Le Mans - LMP2	Vector Sport	1	0	0	0	0	N/A	22nd
2023	FIA World Endurance Championship - LMP2	Vector Sport	7	0	0	0	0	29	16th
2023	24 Hours of Le Mans - LMP2	Vector Sport	1	0	0	0	0	N/A	7th
2024	European Le Mans Series - LMP2	Vector Sport	6	0	0	0	1	21	14th
2024	24 Hours of Le Mans - LMP2	Vector Sport	1	0	0	0	0	N/A	5th
2025	European Le Mans Series - LMP2	Vector Sport	6	0	0	0	2	54	4th
2025	24 Hours of Le Mans - LMP2	Vector Sport	1	0	0	0	0	N/A	12th
2026	European Le Mans Series - LMP2	Vector Sport	6	0	0	0	0	44	8th
2026	24 Hours of Le Mans - LMP2	Vector Sport	1	0	0	0	0	N/A	4th

^{†} As Cullen was a guest driver, he was ineligible for championship points.

=== Complete British Formula Ford Championship results ===
(key) (Races in bold indicate pole position) (Races in italics indicate fastest lap)

Year	Team	1	2	3	4	5	6	7	8	9	10	11	12	13	14	15	16	17	18	19	20	21	22	23	24	Pos	Points
2012	Race Car Consultants	OUL; 1; 8	OUL; 2; 5	OUL; 3; 10	BRI; 1; 9	BRI; 2; 9	BRI; 3 Ret	ROC; 1; 5	ROC; 2; 7	ROC; 3; 5	BHGP; 1 Ret	BHGP; 2 Ret	BHGP; 3 Ret	NÜR; 1; 6	NÜR; 2; 4	NÜR; 3; 5	SNE; 1; 6	SNE; 2; 6	SNE; 3 Ret	SIL; 1; 6	SIL; 2; 5	SIL; 3; 3	DON; 1; 6	DON; 2; 3	DON; 3 C	6th	324

=== Complete GP3 Series results ===
(key) (Races in bold indicate pole position) (Races in italics indicate fastest lap)

Year	Entrant	1	2	3	4	5	6	7	8	9	10	11	12	13	14	15	16	17	18	Pos	Points
2013	Marussia Manor Racing	CAT; FEA; 21	CAT; SPR; Ret	VAL; FEA; 20	VAL; SPR; 20	SIL; FEA; 21	SIL; SPR; 17	NÜR; FEA; 19	NÜR; SPR; 25	HUN; FEA; 23	HUN; SPR; Ret	SPA; FEA; 18	SPA; SPR; 17	MNZ; FEA; 20	MNZ; SPR; Ret	YMC; FEA; 20	YMC; SPR; 24			29th	0
2014	Marussia Manor Racing	CAT; FEA; 15	CAT; SPR; 16	RBR; FEA; 17	RBR; SPR; 13	SIL; FEA; 19	SIL; SPR; Ret	HOC; FEA; 20	HOC; SPR; 19	HUN; FEA; 24	HUN; SPR; 21	SPA; FEA; 14	SPA; SPR; 13	MNZ; FEA; Ret	MNZ; SPR; 16	SOC; FEA	SOC; SPR			25th	0
2014	Trident																	YMC; FEA; 19	YMC; SPR; Ret	25th	0

=== Complete Porsche Supercup results ===
(key) (Races in bold indicate pole position) (Races in italics indicate fastest lap)

Year	Team	1	2	3	4	5	6	7	8	9	10	11	Pos.	Pts
2015	VERVA Lechner Racing Team	CAT	MON	RBR	SIL; Ret	HUN; Ret	SPA; 19	SPA; 12	MNZ; 20	MNZ; 22	USA; C	USA; 15	18th	10
2016	Lechner Racing Middle East	CAT; 13	MON; 14	RBR; 6	SIL; 20	HUN; 8	HOC; 14	SPA; 14	MNZ; Ret	USA; 14	USA; 14		11th	45
2017	Walter Lechner Racing Team	CAT; 21	CAT; 16	MON; 12	RBR; 12	SIL; Ret	HUN; Ret	SPA; 15	SPA; 11	MNZ; 6	MEX; 9	MEX; 9	11th	41

=== Complete European Le Mans Series results ===
Year	Entrant	Class	Chassis	Engine	1	2	3	4	5	6	Rank	Points
2018	APR - Rebellion Racing	LMP2	Oreca 07	Gibson GK428 4.2 L V8	LEC; 15	MNZ; 8	RBR; 6	SIL; 5	SPA; 15‡	ALG; 12	12th	23.25
2019	United Autosports	LMP2	Ligier JS P217	Gibson GK428 4.2 L V8	LEC; 12	MNZ; 3	CAT; 8	SIL; 8	SPA; 9	ALG; 4	12th	37.5
2020	DragonSpeed	LMP2	Oreca 07	Gibson GK428 4.2 L V8	LEC; 8	SPA; 14	LEC	MNZ	ALG		24th	4.5
2024	Vector Sport	LMP2	Oreca 07	Gibson GK428 4.2 L V8	CAT; 10	LEC; 10	IMO; 3	SPA; 8	MUG; 12	ALG; Ret	14th	21
2025	Vector Sport	LMP2	Oreca 07	Gibson GK428 4.2 L V8	CAT; 3	LEC; 4	IMO; 12	SPA; 7	SIL; 3	ALG; 7	4th	54
2026	Vector Sport	LMP2	Oreca 07	Gibson GK428 4.2 L V8	CAT; 6	LEC; 5	IMO; 6	SPA; 9	SIL; 7	ALG; 5	8th	44

^{‡} Half points awarded as less than 75% of race distance was completed.

=== Complete IMSA SportsCar Championship results ===
(key) (Races in bold indicate pole position; races in italics indicate fastest lap)

Year	Entrant	Class	Make	Engine	1	2	3	4	5	6	7	8	Rank	Points
2019	DragonSpeed	LMP2	Oreca 07	Gibson GK428 4.2 L V8	DAY; 1	SEB	MDO	WGL	MOS	ELK	LGA	PET	8th	35

=== Complete 24 Hours of Le Mans results ===
Year	Team	Co-Drivers	Car	Class	Laps	Pos.	Class Pos.
2019	(United States) United Autosports	(United Kingdom) Alex Brundle (United Kingdom) Will Owen	Ligier JS P217-Gibson	LMP2	348	19th	14th
2020	(Russia) G-Drive Racing with Algarve	(United Kingdom) Oliver Jarvis (United Kingdom) Nick Tandy	Aurus 01-Gibson	LMP2	105	DNF	DNF
2021	(United States) Risi Competizione	(United Kingdom) Oliver Jarvis (Brazil) Felipe Nasr	Oreca 07-Gibson	LMP2	275	NC	NC
2022	(United Kingdom) Vector Sport	(France) Sébastien Bourdais (Switzerland) Nico Müller	Oreca 07-Gibson	LMP2	357	27th	22nd
2023	(United Kingdom) Vector Sport	(France) Gabriel Aubry (Liechtenstein) Matthias Kaiser	Oreca 07-Gibson	LMP2	325	15th	7th
2024	(United Kingdom) Vector Sport	(France) Patrick Pilet (Monaco) Stéphane Richelmi	Oreca 07-Gibson	LMP2	297	19th	5th
2025	(United Kingdom) RLR MSport	(Denmark) Michael Jensen (France) Patrick Pilet	Oreca 07-Gibson	LMP2	362	29th	12th
2025	(United Kingdom) RLR MSport	(Denmark) Michael Jensen (France) Patrick Pilet	Oreca 07-Gibson	LMP2 Pro-Am	362	29th	7th
2026	(United Kingdom) Vector Sport	(Brazil) Pietro Fittipaldi (Grenada) Vladislav Lomko	Oreca 07-Gibson	LMP2	360	18th	4th

=== Complete FIA World Endurance Championship results ===
(key) (Races in bold indicate pole position) (Races in italics indicate fastest lap)

Year	Entrant	Class	Car	Engine	1	2	3	4	5	6	7	8	Rank	Points
2019–20	Jackie Chan DC Racing	LMP2	Oreca 07	Gibson GK428 4.2 L V8	SIL	FUJ	SHA	BHR	COA	SPA; 6	LMS	BHR	16th	8
2022	Vector Sport	LMP2	Oreca 07	Gibson GK428 4.2 L V8	SEB; NC	SPA; 10	LMS; 13	MNZ; 3	FUJ; 9	BHR; 9			14th	21
2023	Vector Sport	LMP2	Oreca 07	Gibson GK428 4.2 L V8	SEB; 9	ALG; 11	SPA; Ret	LMS; 5	MNZ; Ret	FUJ; 7	BHR; NC		16th	29
