= Vector Sport =

British racing team (founded 2021)

(United Kingdom) Vector Sport
- Founded: 2021
- Founder(s): Gary Holland
- Base: Silverstone, United Kingdom
- Team principal(s): Gary Holland
- Current series: European Le Mans Series
- Former series: FIA World Endurance Championship
- Current drivers: European Le Mans Series: 10. (Republic of Ireland) Ryan Cullen (Brazil) Felipe Drugovich (Monaco) Stéphane Richelmi

Vector Sport is a British sports car racing team currently competing in the European Le Mans Series. Founded in 2021 by Gary Holland, a former team manager at Jota Sport and Dragon Racing, the Silverstone-based outfit has focused its on-track operations on the LMP2 class, entering the FIA World Endurance Championship in 2022 and 2023.

At the end of 2022, Vector agreed a technical partnership to run the Isotta Fraschini Tipo 6 LMH-C in the Le Mans Hypercar category in 2024. However, the teams split amidst alleged contract breaches on the part of Isotta Fraschini, who later partnered with Duqueine Team.

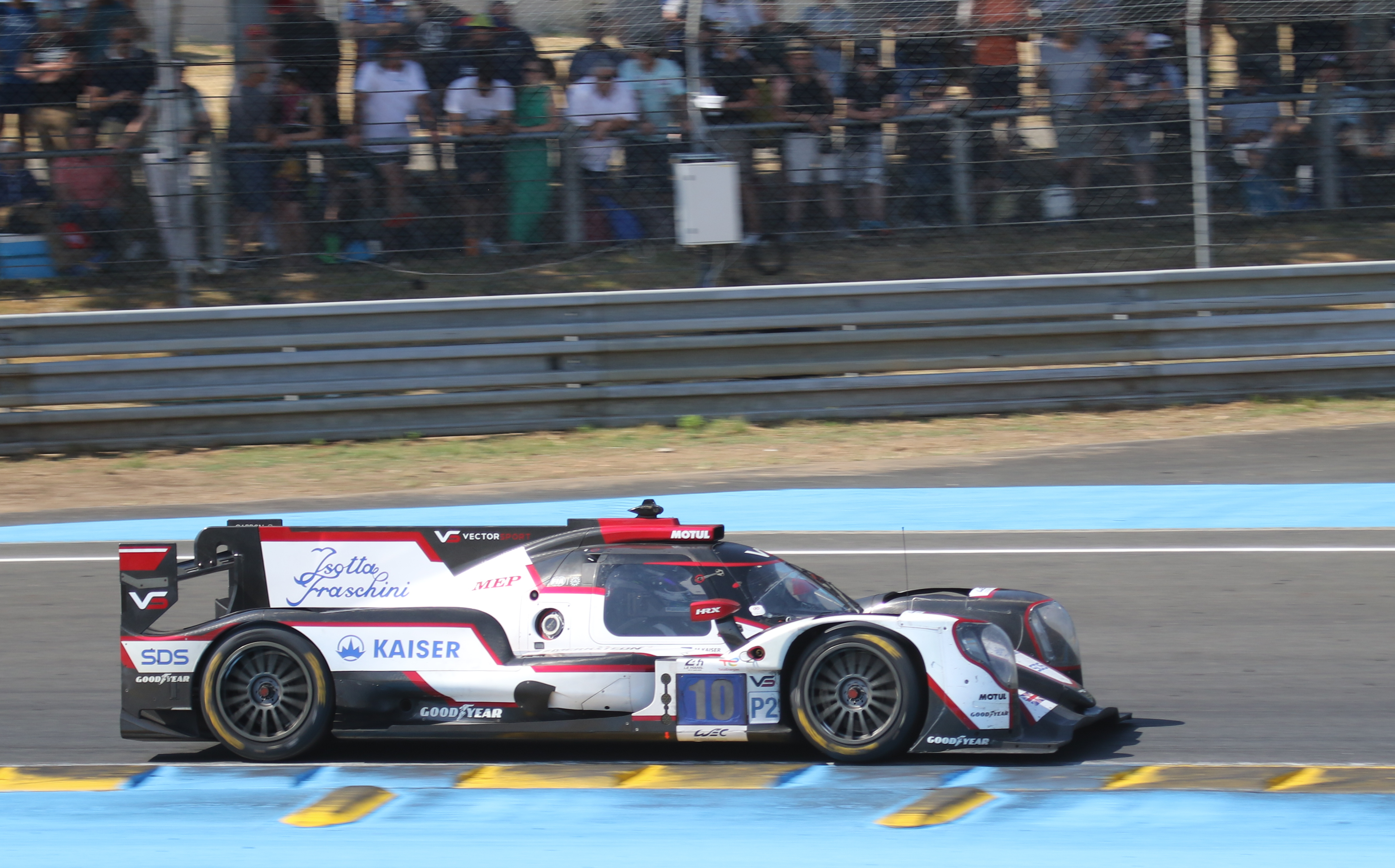
Vector Sport at the Centenary edition of the 24 Hours of Le Mans.

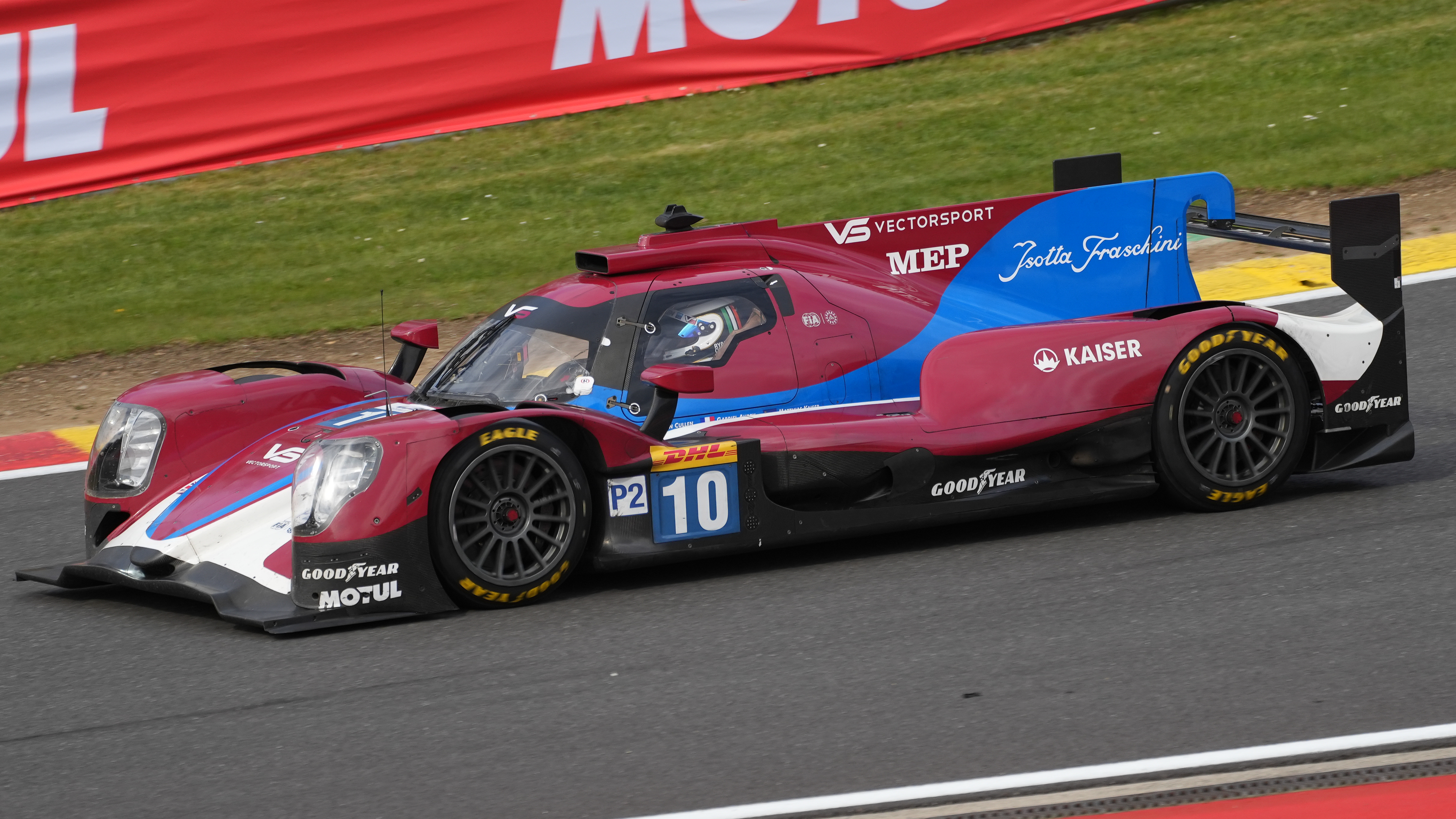
Vector's Ryan Cullen driving at the 2023 6 Hours of Spa-Francorchamps.

== Racing record ==
=== 24 Hours of Le Mans results ===
Year	Entrant	No.	Car	Drivers	Class	Laps	Pos.	Class Pos.
2022	(United Kingdom) Vector Sport	10	Oreca 07-Gibson	(France) Sébastien Bourdais (Republic of Ireland) Ryan Cullen (Switzerland) Nico Müller	LMP2	357	27th	22nd
2023	(United Kingdom) Vector Sport	10	Oreca 07-Gibson	(France) Gabriel Aubry (Republic of Ireland) Ryan Cullen (Liechtenstein) Matthias Kaiser	LMP2	325	15th	7th
2024	(United Kingdom) Vector Sport	10	Oreca 07-Gibson	(Republic of Ireland) Ryan Cullen (France) Patrick Pilet (Monaco) Stéphane Richelmi	LMP2	297	19th	5th
2025	(United Kingdom) RLR MSport	16	Oreca 07-Gibson	(Republic of Ireland) Ryan Cullen (Denmark) Michael Jensen (France) Patrick Pilet	LMP2 (Pro-Am)	362	29th	7th
2026	(United Kingdom) Vector Sport	26	Oreca 07-Gibson	(Republic of Ireland) Ryan Cullen (Brazil) Pietro Fittipaldi (Grenada) Vladislav Lomko	LMP2	360	18th	4th

=== FIA World Endurance Championship ===
Year	Entrant	Class	No	Chassis	Engine	Drivers	1	2	3	4	5	6	7	Pos.	Pts
2022	(United Kingdom) Vector Sport	LMP2	10	Oreca 07	Gibson GK428 4.2L V8	(Republic of Ireland) Ryan Cullen (Switzerland) Nico Müller (rounds 1–4) (Germany) Mike Rockenfeller (round 1) (France) Sébastien Bourdais (rounds 2–6) (Netherlands) Renger van der Zande (rounds 5–6)	SEB; NC	SPA; 10	LMN; 22	MNZ; 3	FUJ; 9	BHR; 9		10th	21
2023	(United Kingdom) Vector Sport	LMP2	10	Oreca 07	Gibson GK428 4.2L V8	(France) Gabriel Aubry (Republic of Ireland) Ryan Cullen (Liechtenstein) Matthias Kaiser	SEB; 9	ALG; 11	SPA; Ret	LMS; 5	MNZ; Ret	FUJ; 7	BHR; NC	10th	29

=== European Le Mans Series ===
Year	Entrant	Class	No	Chassis	Engine	Drivers	1	2	3	4	5	6	Pos.	Pts
2024	(United Kingdom) Vector Sport	LMP2	10	Oreca 07	Gibson GK428 4.2L V8	(Republic of Ireland) Ryan Cullen (Brazil) Felipe Drugovich (Monaco) Stéphane Richelmi (France) Patrick Pilet	CAT; 10	LEC; 10	IMO; 3	SPA; 8	MUG; 12	ALG; Ret	12th	21
