= Nicky Hays =

American racing driver

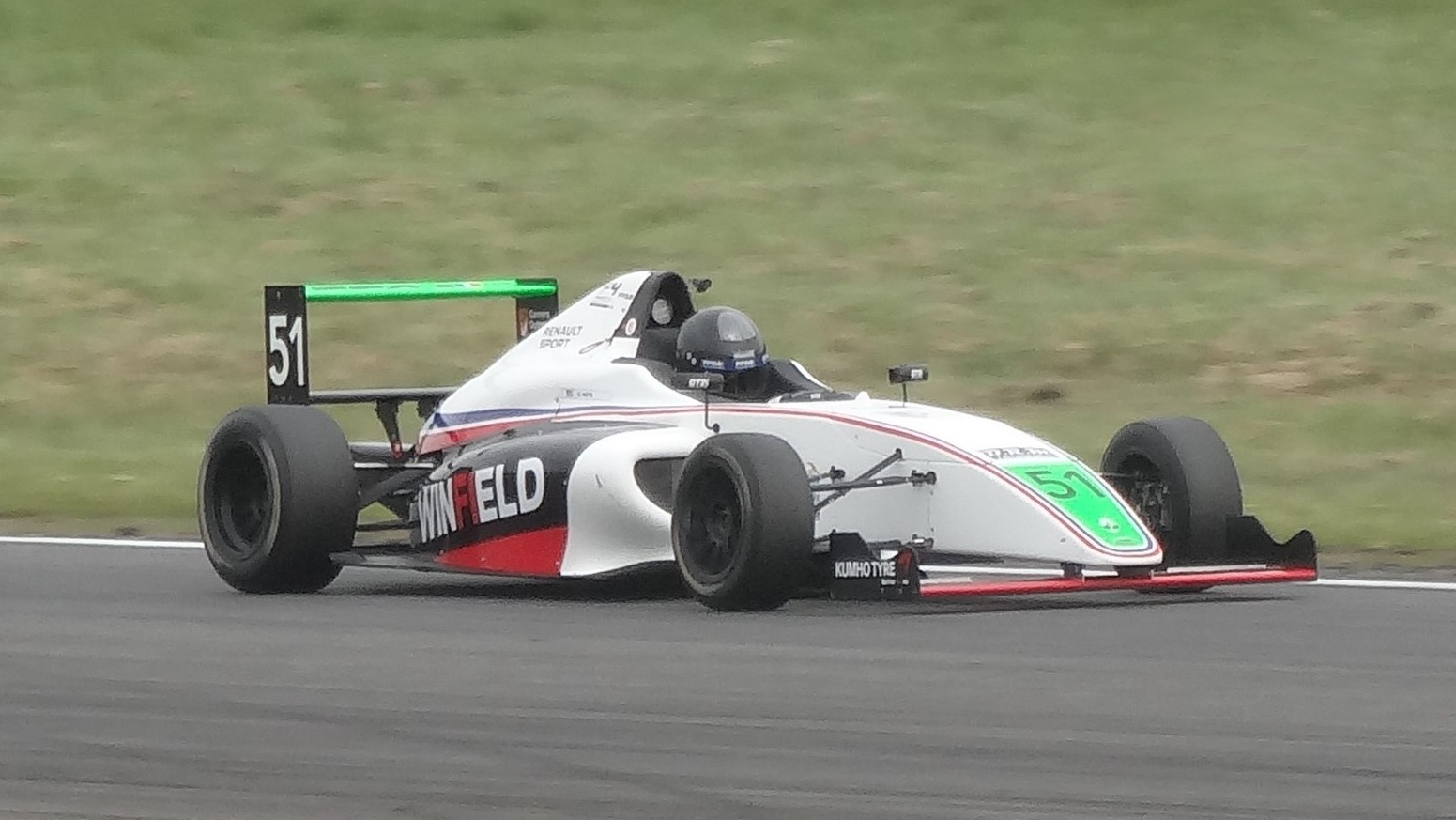
- Hays at Circuit Paul Armagnac in 2019
- Nationality: (United States) American
- Born: September 24, 2001 (age 25) Huntington Beach, California, U.S.

U.S. F2000 National Championship career
- Debut season: 2022
- Current team: Cape Motorsports
- Categorisation: FIA Silver
- Car number: 51
- Starts: 18
- Wins: 0
- Podiums: 2
- Poles: 0
- Fastest laps: 0
- Best finish: 7th in 2022

Previous series
- 2020 2019 2019 2018: Formula Regional Americas Championship; French F4 Championship; Formula 4 United States Championship; F1600 Championship Series

Nicholas "Nicky" Hays (born September 24, 2001) is an American racing driver. He most recently competed in the 2023 Porsche Carrera Cup North America driving for Wright Motorsports. Hays competed in the 2022 USF2000 Championship with Cape Motorsports.

== Racing career ==
=== Lower formulae ===
In 2018, Hays made his single-seater debut in the F1600 Championship Series.

In 2019, Hays competed in the French F4 Championship. He took his first race win at Circuit de Lédenon and finished the season in third only behind champion Hadrien David and runner-up Reshad de Gerus. That year, he also competed in some rounds of the Formula 4 United States Championship for DC Autosport with Cape Motorsports. He finished ninth in the standings with two podiums.

=== Formula Regional ===
In 2020, Hays competed in the Formula Regional Americas Championship for Global Racing Group. He scored two podiums and finished the season in fourth.

=== U.S. F2000 National Championship ===
On February 11, 2022, it was announced that Hays would compete in the U.S. F2000 National Championship with Cape Motorsports for the 2022 season. His season went pretty poorly, being consistently beaten by his teammates Michael d'Orlando, and Jagger Jones, with d'Orlando winning the championship. On the other hand, he would consistently beat teammate Jackson Lee throughout the season, before Lee had to leave the team after the Mid-Ohio round. In the Portland round, Hays finally found his form, picking up consecutive second-place finishes in the final two rounds, bringing home enough points to jump up to seventh place in the final championship standings with 235 points.

=== Indy NXT ===
Hays took part in the 2022 Chris Griffis Memorial Test at Indianapolis Motor Speedway, driving for Abel Motorsports alongside Jack William Miller. He would finish the day 14th out of the 16 drivers, ending up behind his teammate and 0.933 seconds behind leader Danial Frost.

== Racing record ==
=== Career summary ===
Season	Series	Team	Races	Wins	Poles	F/Laps	Podiums	Points	Position
2018	F1600 Championship Series	N/A	6	1	1	2	5	236	15th
2019	Formula 4 United States Championship	DC Autosport with Cape Motorsports	8	0	0	0	2	57	9th
2019	French F4 Championship	FFSA Academy	20	1	0	5	7	173	**3rd**
2020	Formula Regional Americas Championship	Global Racing Group	17	0	0	0	2	142	4th
2022	U.S. F2000 National Championship	Cape Motorsports	18	0	0	0	2	235	7th
2023	Porsche Carrera Cup North America	Wright Motorsports	2	0	0	0	0	6	33rd
2025	Lamborghini Super Trofeo North America - Pro-Am	ANSA MOTORSPORTS							
2026	Michelin Pilot Challenge - GS	Random Vandals Racing							
2026	Le Mans Cup - GT3	Code Racing Development							

* Season still in progress.

=== Complete French F4 Championship results ===
(key) (Races in bold indicate pole position) (Races in italics indicate fastest lap)

Year	1	2	3	4	5	6	7	8	9	10	11	12	13	14	15	16	17	18	19	20	21	Pos	Points
2019	NOG; 1; 4	NOG; 2; 5	NOG; 3; 3	PAU; 1 Ret	PAU; 2 Ret	PAU; 3 DNS	SPA; 1 Ret	SPA; 2; 9	SPA; 3; 3	LÉD; 1; 3	LÉD; 2; 7	LÉD; 3; 1	HUN; 1; 2	HUN; 2; 8	HUN; 3; 6	MAG; 1; 3	MAG; 2; 5	MAG; 3; 4	LEC; 1; 3	LEC; 2 Ret	LEC; 3; 5	3rd	173

=== Complete Formula 4 United States Championship Results ===
(key) (Races in bold indicate pole position) (Races in italics indicate fastest lap) (Races with * indicate most race laps led)

Year	Team	1	2	3	4	5	6	7	8	9	10	11	12	13	14	15	16	17	Pos	Points
2019	DC Autosport with Cape Motorsports	ATL; 1	ATL; 2	ATL; 3	PIT; 1	PIT; 2	PIT; 3	VIR; 1; 6	VIR; 2; 12	VIR; 3 Ret	MOH; 1; 3	MOH; 2; 2	MOH; 3; 15	SEB; 1	SEB; 2	SEB; 3	COA; 1; 8	COA; 2; 4	9th	57

=== Complete Formula Regional Americas Championship Results ===
(key) (Races in bold indicate pole position) (Races in italics indicate fastest lap) (Races with * indicate most race laps led)

Year	Team	1	2	3	4	5	6	7	8	9	10	11	12	13	14	15	16	17	Pos	Points
2020	Global Racing Group	MOH; 1; 9	MOH; 2; 7	VIR; 1; 10	VIR; 2; 4	VIR; 3; 7	BAR; 1; 4	BAR; 2; 2	BAR; 3; 3	SEB; 1; 11	SEB; 2; 6	SEB; 3; 7	HMS; 1; 4	HMS; 2; 4	HMS; 3; 6	COA; 1; 5	COA; 2; 7	COA; 3; 8	4th	142

=== American open-wheel racing results ===
==== U.S. F2000 National Championship ====
(key) (Races in bold indicate pole position) (Races in italics indicate fastest lap) (Races with * indicate most race laps led)

Year	Team	1	2	3	4	5	6	7	8	9	10	11	12	13	14	15	16	17	18	Rank	Points
2022	Cape Motorsports	STP; 1; 15	STP; 2; 8	ALA; 1; 8	ALA; 2; 7	IMS; 1; 13	IMS; 2; 8	IMS; 3; 11	IRP; 17	ROA; 1; 11	ROA; 2; 9	MOH; 1; 7	MOH; 2; 5	MOH; 3; 11	TOR; 1; 6	TOR; 2; 10	POR; 1; 8	POR; 2; 2	POR; 3; 2	7th	235

* Season still in progress.
