= 2025 4 Hours of Silverstone =

Endurance sportscar racing event

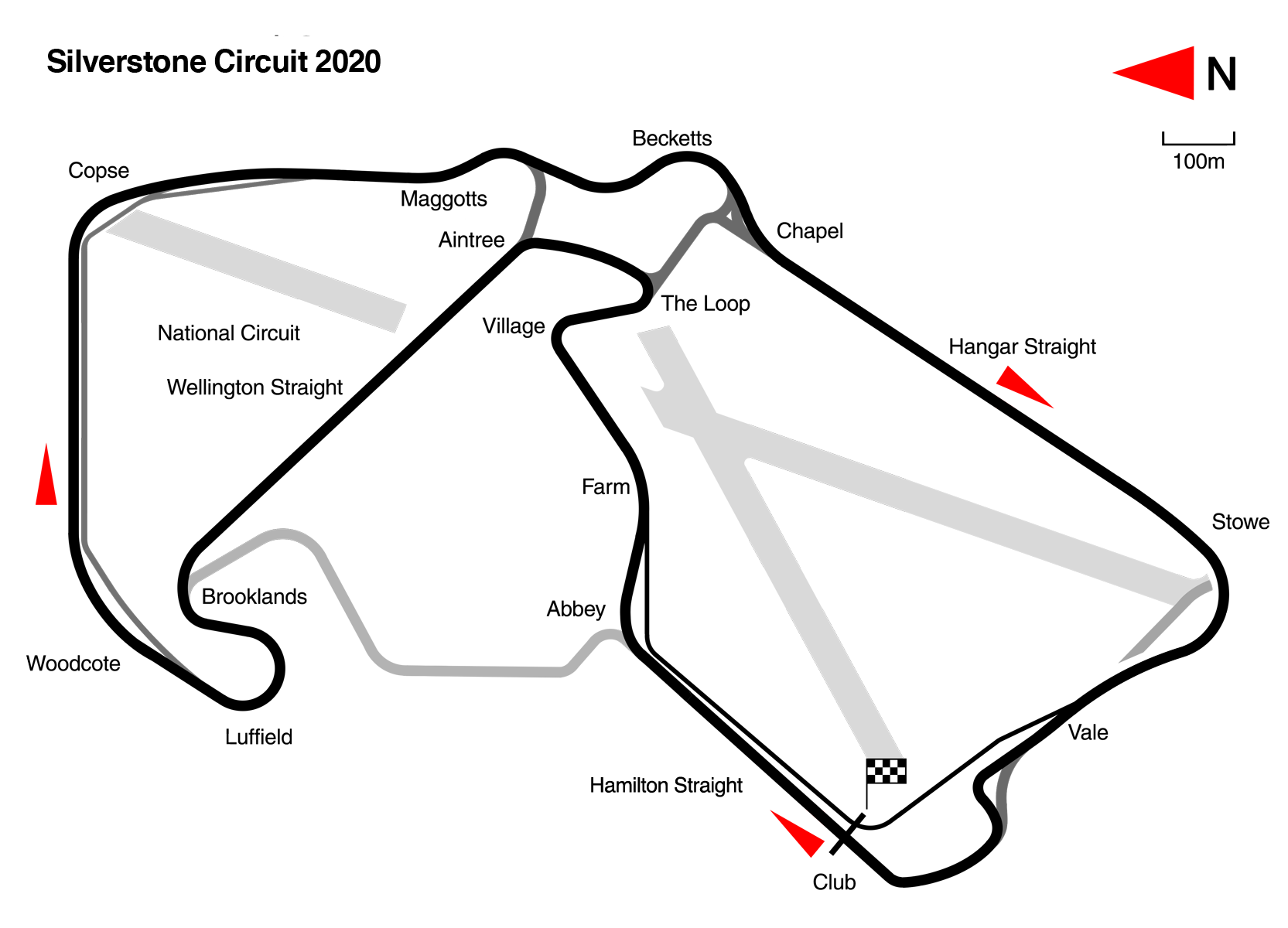
The layout of Silverstone Circuit

The 2025 4 Hours of Silverstone (formally known as the 2025 Goodyear 4 Hours of Silverstone) is an endurance sportscar racing event held between 12 and 14 September 2025 at Silverstone Circuit in Silverstone, Northamptonshire, England. It was the fifth of six rounds of the 2025 European Le Mans Series season, and the first running of the event since 2019 as part of the championship.

== Entry list ==
The provisional entry list was published on 3 September 2025 and consists of 44 entries across 4 categories – 13 in LMP2, 8 in LMP2 Pro-Am, 10 in LMP3, and 13 in LMGT3. Felipe Fraga is set to replace Thomas Laurent in the No. 3 DKR Engineering Oreca. Manuel Espírito Santo returns behind the wheel of the No. 47 CLX Motorsport Oreca after missing the previous round on medical grounds. Daniel Serra will take over from James Calado in the No. 57 Kessel Racing Ferrari in the LMGT3 class.

== Schedule ==
| Date | Time (local: BST) | Event |
|---|---|---|
| Friday, 12 September | 11:00 | Free Practice 1 |
| Friday, 12 September | 15:10 | Bronze Driver Collective Test |
| Saturday, 13 September | 10:10 | Free Practice 2 |
| Saturday, 13 September | 14:20 | Qualifying – LMGT3 |
| Saturday, 13 September | 14:45 | Qualifying – LMP3 |
| Saturday, 13 September | 15:10 | Qualifying – LMP2 Pro-Am |
| Saturday, 13 September | 15:35 | Qualifying – LMP2 |
| Sunday, 14 September | 11:00 | Race |

== Free practice ==
Two practice sessions are scheduled to be held before the event: one on Friday, and one on Saturday. Both sessions are scheduled to run for 90 minutes.

=== Practice 1 ===
The first practice session will start at 11:00 BST on Friday.

=== Practice 2 ===
The second practice session will start at 10:10 BST on Saturday.

== Qualifying ==
Qualifying will start at 14:20 BST, with four sessions of fifteen minutes each, one session for each class.

== Race ==
The race was scheduled to start start at 12:00 BST, and was set to run for 4 hours. Due to inclement weather, however, the race began at 11:00 BST.

=== Race results ===
The minimum number of laps for classification (70% of overall winning car's distance) was 73 laps. Class winners are in bold and ‡.

| Pos | Class | No | Team | Drivers | Chassis | Tyre | Laps | Time/Retired |
| Pos | Class | No | Team | Drivers | Engine | Tyre | Laps | Time/Retired |
|---|---|---|---|---|---|---|---|---|
| 1 | **LMP2** | **18** | **(France) IDEC Sport** | **(United Kingdom) Jamie Chadwick (France) Mathys Jaubert (Spain) Daniel Juncadella** | **Oreca 07** | G | **104** | **4:34:32.741‡** |
| 1 | **LMP2** | **18** | **(France) IDEC Sport** | **(United Kingdom) Jamie Chadwick (France) Mathys Jaubert (Spain) Daniel Juncadella** | **Gibson GK428 4.2 L V8** | G | **104** | **4:34:32.741‡** |
| 2 | LMP2 | 43 | (Poland) Inter Europol Competition | (France) Tom Dillmann (Poland) Jakub Śmiechowski (United Kingdom) Nick Yelloly | Oreca 07 | G | 104 | +5.941 |
| 2 | LMP2 | 43 | (Poland) Inter Europol Competition | (France) Tom Dillmann (Poland) Jakub Śmiechowski (United Kingdom) Nick Yelloly | Gibson GK428 4.2 L V8 | G | 104 | +5.941 |
| 3 | LMP2 | 10 | (United Kingdom) Vector Sport | (Republic of Ireland) Ryan Cullen (Brazil) Pietro Fittipaldi (France) Vladislav Lomko | Oreca 07 | G | 104 | +55.237 |
| 3 | LMP2 | 10 | (United Kingdom) Vector Sport | (Republic of Ireland) Ryan Cullen (Brazil) Pietro Fittipaldi (France) Vladislav Lomko | Gibson GK428 4.2 L V8 | G | 104 | +55.237 |
| 4 | LMP2 | 28 | (France) IDEC Sport | (France) Paul-Loup Chatin (France) Paul Lafargue (Netherlands) Job van Uitert | Oreca 07 | G | 104 | +55.886 |
| 4 | LMP2 | 28 | (France) IDEC Sport | (France) Paul-Loup Chatin (France) Paul Lafargue (Netherlands) Job van Uitert | Gibson GK428 4.2 L V8 | G | 104 | +55.886 |
| 5 | LMP2 | 25 | (Portugal) Algarve Pro Racing | (Spain) Lorenzo Fluxá (Liechtenstein) Matthias Kaiser (France) Théo Pourchaire | Oreca 07 | G | 104 | +57.942 |
| 5 | LMP2 | 25 | (Portugal) Algarve Pro Racing | (Spain) Lorenzo Fluxá (Liechtenstein) Matthias Kaiser (France) Théo Pourchaire | Gibson GK428 4.2 L V8 | G | 104 | +57.942 |
| 6 | LMP2 | 24 | (United Kingdom) Nielsen Racing | (Portugal) Filipe Albuquerque (Turkey) Cem Bölükbaşı (Austria) Ferdinand Habsburg | Oreca 07 | G | 104 | +1:01.972 |
| 6 | LMP2 | 24 | (United Kingdom) Nielsen Racing | (Portugal) Filipe Albuquerque (Turkey) Cem Bölükbaşı (Austria) Ferdinand Habsburg | Gibson GK428 4.2 L V8 | G | 104 | +1:01.972 |
| 7 | **LMP2 Pro-Am** | **20** | **(Portugal) Algarve Pro Racing** | **(United Kingdom) Olli Caldwell (Greece) Kriton Lendoudis (United Kingdom) Alex Quinn** | **Oreca 07** | G | **104** | **+1:04.299‡** |
| 7 | **LMP2 Pro-Am** | **20** | **(Portugal) Algarve Pro Racing** | **(United Kingdom) Olli Caldwell (Greece) Kriton Lendoudis (United Kingdom) Alex Quinn** | **Gibson GK428 4.2 L V8** | G | **104** | **+1:04.299‡** |
| 8 | LMP2 Pro-Am | 99 | (United States) AO by TF | (United States) Dane Cameron (Switzerland) Louis Delétraz (United States) P. J. Hyett | Oreca 07 | G | 104 | +1:04.440 |
| 8 | LMP2 Pro-Am | 99 | (United States) AO by TF | (United States) Dane Cameron (Switzerland) Louis Delétraz (United States) P. J. Hyett | Gibson GK428 4.2 L V8 | G | 104 | +1:04.440 |
| 9 | LMP2 Pro-Am | 83 | (Italy) AF Corse | (France) François Perrodo (Italy) Alessio Rovera (France) Matthieu Vaxivière | Oreca 07 | G | 104 | +1:05.104 |
| 9 | LMP2 Pro-Am | 83 | (Italy) AF Corse | (France) François Perrodo (Italy) Alessio Rovera (France) Matthieu Vaxivière | Gibson GK428 4.2 L V8 | G | 104 | +1:05.104 |
| 10 | LMP2 | 9 | (Germany) Iron Lynx – Proton | (Italy) Matteo Cairoli (France) Macéo Capietto (Germany) Jonas Ried | Oreca 07 | G | 104 | +1:05.886 |
| 10 | LMP2 | 9 | (Germany) Iron Lynx – Proton | (Italy) Matteo Cairoli (France) Macéo Capietto (Germany) Jonas Ried | Gibson GK428 4.2 L V8 | G | 104 | +1:05.886 |
| 11 | LMP2 | 48 | (France) VDS Panis Racing | (United Kingdom) Oliver Gray (France) Esteban Masson (France) Charles Milesi | Oreca 07 | G | 104 | +1:08.439 |
| 11 | LMP2 | 48 | (France) VDS Panis Racing | (United Kingdom) Oliver Gray (France) Esteban Masson (France) Charles Milesi | Gibson GK428 4.2 L V8 | G | 104 | +1:08.439 |
| 12 | LMP2 | 34 | (Poland) Inter Europol Competition | (Italy) Luca Ghiotto (Mozambique) Pedro Perino (France) Jean-Baptiste Simmenauer | Oreca 07 | G | 104 | +1:24.734 |
| 12 | LMP2 | 34 | (Poland) Inter Europol Competition | (Italy) Luca Ghiotto (Mozambique) Pedro Perino (France) Jean-Baptiste Simmenauer | Gibson GK428 4.2 L V8 | G | 104 | +1:24.734 |
| 13 | LMP2 Pro-Am | 29 | (France) TDS Racing | (Switzerland) Mathias Beche (France) Clément Novalak (United States) Rodrigo Sales | Oreca 07 | G | 104 | +1:27.498 |
| 13 | LMP2 Pro-Am | 29 | (France) TDS Racing | (Switzerland) Mathias Beche (France) Clément Novalak (United States) Rodrigo Sales | Gibson GK428 4.2 L V8 | G | 104 | +1:27.498 |
| 14 | LMP2 | 22 | (United Kingdom) United Autosports | (United Kingdom) Ben Hanley (Venezuela) Manuel Maldonado (Switzerland) Grégoire Saucy | Oreca 07 | G | 103 | +1 Lap |
| 14 | LMP2 | 22 | (United Kingdom) United Autosports | (United Kingdom) Ben Hanley (Venezuela) Manuel Maldonado (Switzerland) Grégoire Saucy | Gibson GK428 4.2 L V8 | G | 103 | +1 Lap |
| 15 | LMP2 Pro-Am | 21 | (United Kingdom) United Autosports | (United Kingdom) Oliver Jarvis (Japan) Marino Sato (Brazil) Daniel Schneider | Oreca 07 | G | 103 | +1 Lap |
| 15 | LMP2 Pro-Am | 21 | (United Kingdom) United Autosports | (United Kingdom) Oliver Jarvis (Japan) Marino Sato (Brazil) Daniel Schneider | Gibson GK428 4.2 L V8 | G | 103 | +1 Lap |
| 16 | LMP2 | 30 | (France) Duqueine Team | (France) Reshad de Gerus (Israel) Roy Nissany (Denmark) Benjamin Pedersen | Oreca 07 | G | 103 | +1 Lap |
| 16 | LMP2 | 30 | (France) Duqueine Team | (France) Reshad de Gerus (Israel) Roy Nissany (Denmark) Benjamin Pedersen | Gibson GK428 4.2 L V8 | G | 103 | +1 Lap |
| 17 | LMP2 | 47 | (Switzerland) CLX Motorsport | (Portugal) Manuel Espírito Santo (Brazil) Enzo Fittipaldi | Oreca 07 | G | 103 | +1 lap |
| 17 | LMP2 | 47 | (Switzerland) CLX Motorsport | (Portugal) Manuel Espírito Santo (Brazil) Enzo Fittipaldi | Gibson GK428 4.2 L V8 | G | 103 | +1 lap |
| 18 | **LMP3** | **17** | **(Switzerland) CLX Motorsport** | **(France) Adrien Closmenil (Denmark) Theodor Jensen (France) Paul Lanchère** | **Ligier JS P325** | M | **97** | **+7 Laps‡** |
| 18 | **LMP3** | **17** | **(Switzerland) CLX Motorsport** | **(France) Adrien Closmenil (Denmark) Theodor Jensen (France) Paul Lanchère** | **Toyota V35A-FTS 3.5 L Turbo V6** | M | **97** | **+7 Laps‡** |
| 19 | LMP3 | 68 | (France) M Racing | (France) Quentin Antonel (France) Stéphane Tribaudini | Ligier JS P325 | M | 97 | +7 Laps |
| 19 | LMP3 | 68 | (France) M Racing | (France) Quentin Antonel (France) Stéphane Tribaudini | Toyota V35A-FTS 3.5 L Turbo V6 | M | 97 | +7 Laps |
| 20 | LMP3 | 35 | (France) Ultimate | (France) Jean-Baptiste Lahaye (France) Matthieu Lahaye (France) Louis Stern | Ligier JS P325 | M | 97 | +7 Laps |
| 20 | LMP3 | 35 | (France) Ultimate | (France) Jean-Baptiste Lahaye (France) Matthieu Lahaye (France) Louis Stern | Toyota V35A-FTS 3.5 L Turbo V6 | M | 97 | +7 Laps |
| 21 | LMP3 | 8 | (Poland) Team Virage | (Algeria) Julien Gerbi (Netherlands) Rik Koen (Spain) Daniel Nogales | Ligier JS P325 | M | 96 | +8 Laps |
| 21 | LMP3 | 8 | (Poland) Team Virage | (Algeria) Julien Gerbi (Netherlands) Rik Koen (Spain) Daniel Nogales | Toyota V35A-FTS 3.5 L Turbo V6 | M | 96 | +8 Laps |
| 22 | LMP3 | 88 | (Poland) Inter Europol Competition | (United Kingdom) Tim Creswick (Belgium) Douwe Dedecker (United States) Reece Gold | Ligier JS P325 | M | 96 | +8 Laps |
| 22 | LMP3 | 88 | (Poland) Inter Europol Competition | (United Kingdom) Tim Creswick (Belgium) Douwe Dedecker (United States) Reece Gold | Toyota V35A-FTS 3.5 L Turbo V6 | M | 96 | +8 Laps |
| 23 | LMP3 | 4 | (Luxembourg) DKR Engineering | (United States) Wyatt Brichacek (Denmark) Mikkel Gaarde Pedersen (Estonia) Antti Rammo | Ginetta G61-LT-P3 Evo | M | 96 | +8 Laps |
| 23 | LMP3 | 4 | (Luxembourg) DKR Engineering | (United States) Wyatt Brichacek (Denmark) Mikkel Gaarde Pedersen (Estonia) Antti Rammo | Toyota V35A-FTS 3.5 L Turbo V6 | M | 96 | +8 Laps |
| 24 | LMP3 | 11 | (Italy) EuroInternational | (Mexico) Ian Aguilera (France) Fabien Michal | Ligier JS P325 | M | 96 | +8 Laps |
| 24 | LMP3 | 11 | (Italy) EuroInternational | (Mexico) Ian Aguilera (France) Fabien Michal | Toyota V35A-FTS 3.5 L Turbo V6 | M | 96 | +8 Laps |
| 25 | **LMGT3** | **50** | **(Italy) Richard Mille AF Corse** | **(Italy) Riccardo Agostini (Brazil) Custodio Toledo (France) Lilou Wadoux** | **Ferrari 296 GT3** | G | **95** | **+9 Laps‡** |
| 25 | **LMGT3** | **50** | **(Italy) Richard Mille AF Corse** | **(Italy) Riccardo Agostini (Brazil) Custodio Toledo (France) Lilou Wadoux** | **Ferrari F163CE 3.0 L Turbo V6** | G | **95** | **+9 Laps‡** |
| 26 | LMGT3 | 86 | (United Kingdom) GR Racing | (United Kingdom) Tom Fleming (Italy) Riccardo Pera (United Kingdom) Michael Wainwright | Ferrari 296 GT3 | G | 95 | +9 Laps |
| 26 | LMGT3 | 86 | (United Kingdom) GR Racing | (United Kingdom) Tom Fleming (Italy) Riccardo Pera (United Kingdom) Michael Wainwright | Ferrari F163CE 3.0 L Turbo V6 | G | 95 | +9 Laps |
| 27 | LMGT3 | 82 | (United Kingdom) TF Sport | (Angola) Rui Andrade (Republic of Ireland) Charlie Eastwood (Japan) Hiroshi Koizumi | Chevrolet Corvette Z06 GT3.R | G | 95 | +9 Laps |
| 27 | LMGT3 | 82 | (United Kingdom) TF Sport | (Angola) Rui Andrade (Republic of Ireland) Charlie Eastwood (Japan) Hiroshi Koizumi | Chevrolet LT6.R 5.5 L V8 | G | 95 | +9 Laps |
| 28 | LMGT3 | 57 | (Switzerland) Kessel Racing | (Japan) Takeshi Kimura (Brazil) Daniel Serra (United Kingdom) Ben Tuck | Ferrari 296 GT3 | G | 95 | +9 Laps |
| 28 | LMGT3 | 57 | (Switzerland) Kessel Racing | (Japan) Takeshi Kimura (Brazil) Daniel Serra (United Kingdom) Ben Tuck | Ferrari F163CE 3.0 L Turbo V6 | G | 95 | +9 Laps |
| 29 | LMGT3 | 60 | (Germany) Proton Competition | (Italy) Matteo Cressoni (Austria) Horst Felbermayr Jr. (Austria) Horst Felix Felbermayr | Porsche 911 GT3 R (992) | G | 95 | +9 Laps |
| 29 | LMGT3 | 60 | (Germany) Proton Competition | (Italy) Matteo Cressoni (Austria) Horst Felbermayr Jr. (Austria) Horst Felix Felbermayr | Porsche M97/80 4.2 L Flat-6 | G | 95 | +9 Laps |
| 30 | LMGT3 | 59 | (France) Racing Spirit of Léman | (France) Erwan Bastard (France) Valentin Hasse-Clot (France) Clément Mateu | Aston Martin Vantage AMR GT3 Evo | G | 95 | +9 Laps |
| 30 | LMGT3 | 59 | (France) Racing Spirit of Léman | (France) Erwan Bastard (France) Valentin Hasse-Clot (France) Clément Mateu | Aston Martin M177 4.0 L Turbo V8 | G | 95 | +9 Laps |
| 31 | LMGT3 | 74 | (Switzerland) Kessel Racing | (United Kingdom) Andrew Gilbert (Spain) Miguel Molina (Spain) Fran Rueda | Ferrari 296 GT3 | G | 94 | +10 Laps |
| 31 | LMGT3 | 74 | (Switzerland) Kessel Racing | (United Kingdom) Andrew Gilbert (Spain) Miguel Molina (Spain) Fran Rueda | Ferrari F163CE 3.0 L Turbo V6 | G | 94 | +10 Laps |
| 32 | LMGT3 | 55 | (Switzerland) Spirit of Race | (United Kingdom) Duncan Cameron (Republic of Ireland) Matt Griffin (South Africa) David Perel | Ferrari 296 GT3 | G | 94 | +10 Laps |
| 32 | LMGT3 | 55 | (Switzerland) Spirit of Race | (United Kingdom) Duncan Cameron (Republic of Ireland) Matt Griffin (South Africa) David Perel | Ferrari F163CE 3.0 L Turbo V6 | G | 94 | +10 Laps |
| 33 | LMGT3 | 66 | (United Kingdom) JMW Motorsport | (Italy) Gianmaria Bruni (United States) Jason Hart (United States) Scott Noble | Ferrari 296 GT3 | G | 94 | +10 Laps |
| 33 | LMGT3 | 66 | (United Kingdom) JMW Motorsport | (Italy) Gianmaria Bruni (United States) Jason Hart (United States) Scott Noble | Ferrari F163CE 3.0 L Turbo V6 | G | 94 | +10 Laps |
| 34 | LMGT3 | 85 | (Italy) Iron Dames | (Belgium) Sarah Bovy (Denmark) Michelle Gatting (France) Célia Martin | Porsche 911 GT3 R (992) | G | 94 | +10 Laps |
| 34 | LMGT3 | 85 | (Italy) Iron Dames | (Belgium) Sarah Bovy (Denmark) Michelle Gatting (France) Célia Martin | Porsche M97/80 4.2 L Flat-6 | G | 94 | +10 Laps |
| 35 | LMP2 Pro-Am | 27 | (United Kingdom) Nielsen Racing | (Australia) James Allen (United States) John Falb (Brazil) Sérgio Sette Câmara | Oreca 07 | G | 94 | +10 Laps |
| 35 | LMP2 Pro-Am | 27 | (United Kingdom) Nielsen Racing | (Australia) James Allen (United States) John Falb (Brazil) Sérgio Sette Câmara | Gibson GK428 4.2 L V8 | G | 94 | +10 Laps |
| 36 | LMGT3 | 51 | (Italy) AF Corse | (Denmark) Conrad Laursen (Italy) Davide Rigon (France) Charles-Henri Samani | Ferrari 296 GT3 | G | 93 | +11 Laps |
| 36 | LMGT3 | 51 | (Italy) AF Corse | (Denmark) Conrad Laursen (Italy) Davide Rigon (France) Charles-Henri Samani | Ferrari F163CE 3.0 L Turbo V6 | G | 93 | +11 Laps |
| 37 | LMP3 | 31 | (France) Racing Spirit of Léman | (France) Marius Fossard (France) Jean-Ludovic Foubert (France) Jacques Wolff | Ligier JS P325 | M | 92 | +12 Laps |
| 37 | LMP3 | 31 | (France) Racing Spirit of Léman | (France) Marius Fossard (France) Jean-Ludovic Foubert (France) Jacques Wolff | Toyota V35A-FTS 3.5 L Turbo V6 | M | 92 | +12 Laps |
| 38 | LMP2 Pro-Am | 3 | (Luxembourg) DKR Engineering | (Brazil) Felipe Fraga (Germany) Laurents Hörr (Greece) Georgios Kolovos | Oreca 07 | G | 91 | +13 Laps |
| 38 | LMP2 Pro-Am | 3 | (Luxembourg) DKR Engineering | (Brazil) Felipe Fraga (Germany) Laurents Hörr (Greece) Georgios Kolovos | Gibson GK428 4.2 L V8 | G | 91 | +13 Laps |
| 39 | LMP3 | 15 | (United Kingdom) RLR MSport | (United Kingdom) Nick Adcock (France) Gillian Henrion (Denmark) Michael Jensen | Ligier JS P325 | M | 90 | +14 Laps |
| 39 | LMP3 | 15 | (United Kingdom) RLR MSport | (United Kingdom) Nick Adcock (France) Gillian Henrion (Denmark) Michael Jensen | Toyota V35A-FTS 3.5 L Turbo V6 | M | 90 | +14 Laps |
Not classified
| | LMGT3 | 23 | (United Kingdom) United Autosports | (United Kingdom) Michael Birch (United Kingdom) Wayne Boyd (Australia) Garnet Patterson | McLaren 720S GT3 Evo | G | 58 | |
| | LMGT3 | 23 | (United Kingdom) United Autosports | (United Kingdom) Michael Birch (United Kingdom) Wayne Boyd (Australia) Garnet Patterson | McLaren M840T 4.0 L Turbo V8 | G | 58 | |
| | LMP2 | 37 | (Lithuania) CLX – Pure Rxcing | (United Kingdom) Tom Blomqvist (United Kingdom) Alex Malykhin (France) Tristan Vautier | Oreca 07 | G | 24 | Collision damage |
| | LMP2 | 37 | (Lithuania) CLX – Pure Rxcing | (United Kingdom) Tom Blomqvist (United Kingdom) Alex Malykhin (France) Tristan Vautier | Gibson GK428 4.2 L V8 | G | 24 | Collision damage |
| | LMP2 Pro-Am | 77 | (Germany) Proton Competition | (Austria) René Binder (Italy) Giorgio Roda (Netherlands) Bent Viscaal | Oreca 07 | G | 23 | Collision |
| | LMP2 Pro-Am | 77 | (Germany) Proton Competition | (Austria) René Binder (Italy) Giorgio Roda (Netherlands) Bent Viscaal | Gibson GK428 4.2 L V8 | G | 23 | Collision |
| | LMP3 | 12 | (Germany) WTM by Rinaldi Racing | (Germany) Torsten Kratz (Australia) Griffin Peebles (Germany) Leonard Weiss | Duqueine D09 | M | 20 | Mechanical |
| | LMP3 | 12 | (Germany) WTM by Rinaldi Racing | (Germany) Torsten Kratz (Australia) Griffin Peebles (Germany) Leonard Weiss | Toyota V35A-FTS 3.5 L Turbo V6 | M | 20 | Mechanical |
| | LMGT3 | 63 | (Italy) Iron Lynx | (Singapore) Martin Berry (United Kingdom) Lorcan Hanafin (Germany) Fabian Schiller | Mercedes-AMG GT3 Evo | G | 14 | Collision |
| | LMGT3 | 63 | (Italy) Iron Lynx | (Singapore) Martin Berry (United Kingdom) Lorcan Hanafin (Germany) Fabian Schiller | Mercedes-AMG M159 6.2 L V8 | G | 14 | Collision |

== Notes ==
European Le Mans Series
| Previous race: 4 Hours of Spa-Francorchamps | 2025 season | Next race: 4 Hours of Portimão |
