= Vladislav Lomko =

Russian racing driver (born 2004)

- Lomko at Silverstone Circuit in 2026.
- Nationality: (Russia) Russian (Grenada) Grenadian (France) French (Note: Lomko is Russian-Grenadian, but he competes under a French licence as Russian national emblems were banned by the FIA following the Russian invasion of Ukraine.)
- Born: 27 December 2004 (age 21) Nizhny Tagil, Russia

European Le Mans Series career
- Debut season: 2023
- Current team: Vector Sport
- Categorisation: FIA Silver (2023); FIA Gold (2024–)
- Car number: 10
- Former teams: Inter Europol Competition, Cool Racing
- Starts: 15 (15 entries)
- Wins: 1
- Podiums: 4
- Poles: 2
- Fastest laps: 1
- Best finish: 2nd in 2024

Previous series
- 2022 2020-2021 2021 2020-2021 2019: Euroformula Open Championship; ADAC Formula 4 Italian F4 Championship; Formula 4 UAE Championship; French F4 Championship

Vladislav "Vlad" Lomko (Russian: Владислав Ломко; born 27 December 2004) is a Russian-Grenadian racing driver competing in the European Le Mans Series for Vector Sport under a French licence.

== Early career ==
=== Karting ===
Lomko started driving karts in his native Russia, finishing third in the national championship in 2016, before moving to France at the age of fourteen to race in European series. His biggest success on the international karting scene would be winning the Benelux Championship.

=== Formula 4 ===
==== 2019 ====
In 2019, Lomko made his debut in single-seaters, competing in the Budapest round of the French F4 Championship. He would later return to race in the final round at Le Castellet, achieving two top-ten finishes.

==== 2020 ====
For the 2020 season, Lomko switched to the ADAC F4 Championship, partnering Elias Seppänen and fellow rookies Tim Tramnitz and Oliver Bearman at US Racing. The season started in disappointing fashion, as Lomko was the only one out of his teammates to not score a podium finish in the first third of the year. However, at the fourth round at the Nürburgring, he would take his first victory in car racing, scoring the fastest lap in addition to the win. Lomko added to that in the penultimate event at the Lausitzring, winning a chaotic and wet Race 1. He finished the season eighth in the standings, only eleven points behind teammate Bearman, but nonetheless, lowest of the US Racing drivers.

==== 2021 ====
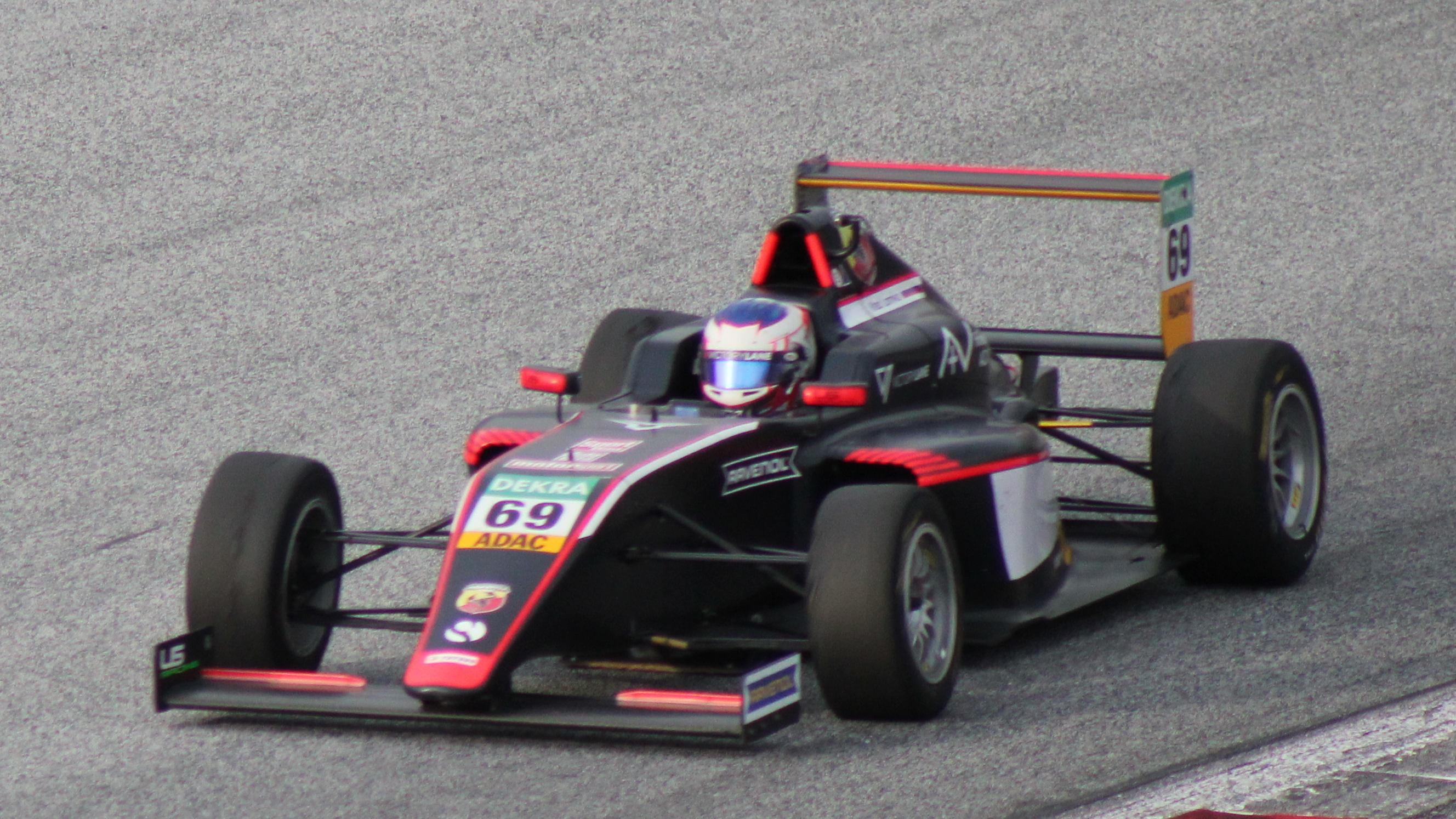
Lomko racing in the 2021 Italian F4 Championship at the Red Bull Ring.

The following year, Lomko made a one-off appearance in the F4 UAE Championship, winning two races of the finale at the Dubai Autodrome.

To partake in his main campaign, Lomko returned to US Racing to once again drive alongside Tramnitz in the German F4 series, but this time being joined by Luke Browning and, on occasions, Alex Dunne. He took a victory at the reversed-grid race at the Sachsenring, fending off former teammate Bearman in the final few laps. Lomko scored three further podiums, all being third places, and ended up sixth, being beaten significantly by both Tramnitz and Browning.

=== Euroformula Open ===
In 2022, Lomko progressed to the Euroformula Open Championship, driving for CryptoTower Racing alongside Christian Mansell and series returnee Josh Mason. In his first race at the Estoril Circuit Lomko, racing under a French licence, finished second and took a rookie victory. The second race would be less successful after contact with Nicola Marinangeli, but he would recover to fifth in race 3. Lomko followed that up with a third place in race 1 at Pau, having started second but being overtaken by teammate Mansell at the start. On Sunday he would change his fortunes however, winning the Pau Grand Prix and taking his first win in the series. A triple of podiums followed at Le Castellet, after which he managed to score two podiums in Belgium from the back of the grid. Having scored his maiden pole position in Budapest, he would only end up taking a podium across the weekend. After stating during the summer break that he had the speed to fight with championship leader Oliver Goethe, Lomko took victory in race 2 at Imola and followed that up with a triple of podiums in Spielberg, which included another race win. The penultimate round saw Lomko converte pole position into victory in a rainy race on Saturday, before two further podiums, including another win, came the following day. Despite this, a win and another second place during the season finale in Barcelona could not prevent Goethe from taking the title, as Lomko was forced to settle for second in the championship, whilst also winning the Rookies' Championship in dominating fashion.

=== Super Formula Lights ===
At the end of 2022, Lomko partook in the Super Formula Lights post-season test at Suzuka, driving for championship-winning team TOM'S alongside Formula Regional Japanese Champion Miki Koyama.

== Sportscar career ==
=== 2023: LMP3 & LMP2 debut ===
For 2023, Lomko switched into prototype racing, driving in the LMP3 class of the Asian Le Mans Series with CD Sport at the start of the year. With a best finish of fifth at Dubai, where Lomko set the fastest lap in race 2, the team finished ninth in the standings. This was preparation for Lomko's main campaign in the European Le Mans Series, where he stepped up to the LMP2 category to partner José María López and Reshad de Gerus at Cool Racing. There, the lineup scored a lone Pro class podium at Spa to end the season sixth out of seven teams.

=== 2024: First LMP2 win ===
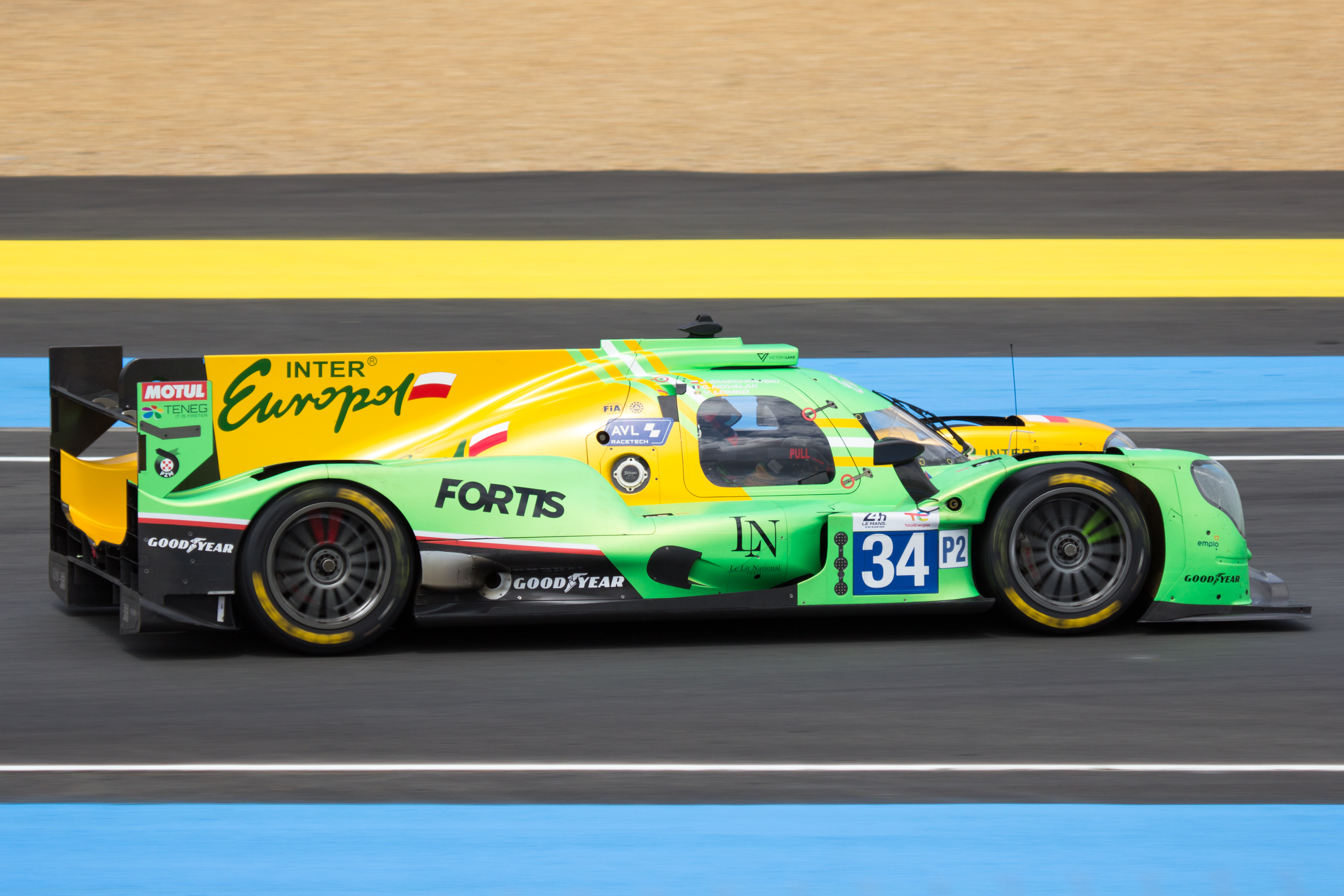
Lomko's No. 34 car at the 2024 24 Hours of Le Mans

After driving in the final three races of the 2024 AsLMS season, Lomko would join Inter Europol Competition with Tom Dillmann and Sebastián Álvarez in the ELMS. At the second round in Le Castellet, two separate gearbox failures for the respective leaders gave the No. 43 Inter Europol lineup an unexpected victory, Lomko's first in sportscar racing and the team's maiden win in the series.

=== 2025–26: Vector Sport tenure ===
Having taken part in the 2024–25 Asian Le Mans Series with Proton Competition, taking one podium at Abu Dhabi, Lomko joined Vector Sport to partner Pietro Fittipaldi and Ryan Cullen for the 2025 ELMS season. They scored a single overall podium — third at a rainy Silverstone — and finished fourth in the standings. Lomko then raced in the 2025–26 Asian Le Mans Series for Vector, finishing 16th in the drivers' standings with a best result of fourth.

Heading into the 2026 ELMS season, Lomko remained at Vector Sport alongside Fittipaldi and Cullen.

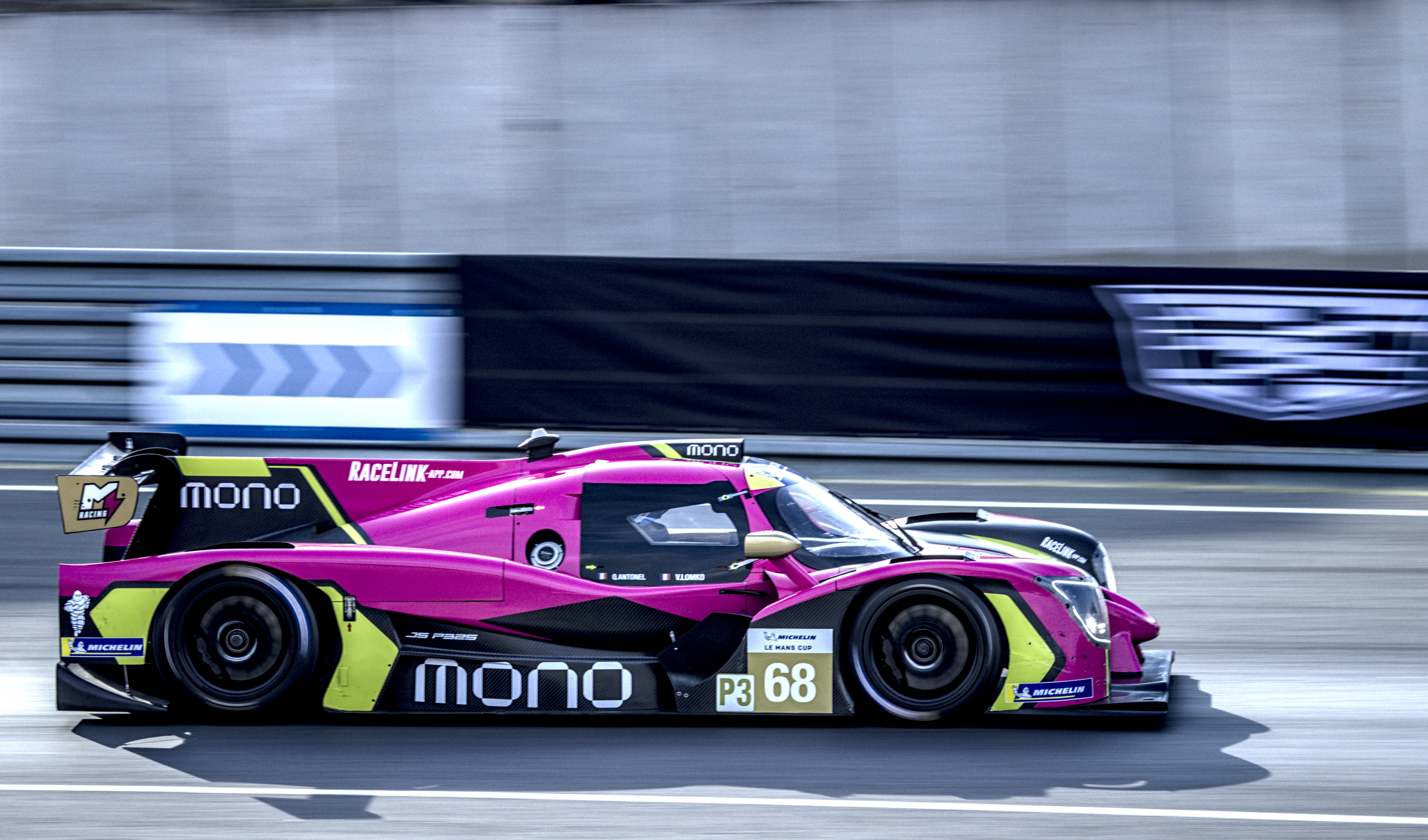
Lomko's M Racing LMP3 at the 2025 Road to Le Mans

== Personal life ==
Lomko's brother Lev is also a racing driver, who recently competed in karts in the KZ2 category.

== Karting record ==
=== Karting career summary ===
Season	Series	Team	Position
2016	Russian Championship — Super Mini		3rd
2016	WSK Champions Cup — 60 Mini	Energy Corse	7th
2016	Andrea Margutti Trophy — 60 Mini	Energy Corse	15th
2016	WSK Super Master Series — 60 Mini	Energy Corse	22nd
2016	SKUSA SuperNationals — X30 Junior	VDK Racing	24th
2017	WSK Champions Cup — OKJ	VDK Racing	NC
2017	WSK Super Master Series — OKJ	VDK Racing	39th
2017	CIK-FIA European Championship — OKJ	VDK Racing	47th
2017	IAME International Final — X30 Junior	VDK Racing	NC
2017	CIK-FIA World Championship — OKJ	VDK Racing	77th
2017	WSK Final Cup — OKJ	VDK Racing	NC
2018	WSK Super Master Series — OKJ	VDK Racing	9th
2018	CIK-FIA European Championship — OKJ	VDK Racing	18th
2018	CIK-FIA World Championship — OKJ	VDK Racing	44th
2019	WSK Super Master Series — OK	KR Motorsport	32nd
2019	WSK Euro Series — OK	KR Motorsport	50th
2019	CIK-FIA European Championship — OK	KR Motorsport	NC
Karting:

== Racing record ==
=== Racing career summary ===
Season	Series	Team	Races	Wins	Poles	F/Laps	Podiums	Points	Position
2019	French F4 Championship	FFSA Academy	6	0	0	0	0	0	NC†
2020	ADAC Formula 4 Championship	US Racing	21	2	0	2	2	113	8th
2020	Italian F4 Championship	US Racing	4	0	0	0	0	0	34th
2021	Formula 4 UAE Championship	BWT Mücke Motorsport	4	2	1	0	2	66	12th
2021	ADAC Formula 4 Championship	US Racing	18	1	0	1	3	133	6th
2021	Italian F4 Championship	US Racing	8	0	0	0	1	43	11th
2021	Drexler Automotive Formula 4 Cup	US Racing	2	0	0	0	1	23	6th
2022	Formula Regional Asian Championship	Hitech Grand Prix	3	0	0	0	0	0	34th
2022	Euroformula Open Championship	CryptoTower Racing	26	6	2	5	19	416	**2nd**
2023	Asian Le Mans Series - LMP3	CD Sport	4	0	0	1	0	18	9th
2023	European Le Mans Series - LMP2	Cool Racing	6	0	2	1	1	69	6th
2023	24 Hours of Le Mans - LMP2	Cool Racing	1	0	0	0	0	N/A	DNF
2023–24	Middle East Trophy - 992	Mühlner Motorsport	2	0	0	0	0	16	10th
2023–24	Asian Le Mans Series - LMP2	Cool Racing	3	0	0	0	0	1	19th
2024	European Le Mans Series - LMP2	Inter Europol Competition	6	1	0	0	2	81	**2nd**
2024	24 Hours of Le Mans - LMP2	Inter Europol Competition	1	0	0	0	1	N/A	**2nd**
2024	International GT Open	Scuderia Villorba Corse	4	0	0	0	0	0	51st
2024–25	Asian Le Mans Series - LMP2	Proton Competition	6	0	6	0	1	63	5th
2025	European Le Mans Series - LMP2	Vector Sport	6	0	0	0	2	54	4th
2025	Le Mans Cup - LMP3	M Racing	2	0	0	0	0	0	NC†
2025–26	Asian Le Mans Series - LMP2	Vector Sport RLR	6	0	0	0	0	18	16th
2025–26	24H Series Middle East - 992	Razoon – more than racing	1	0	0	0	0	0	NC†
2025–26	24H Series Middle East - GT3	Razoon – more than racing	1	0	0	0	0	0	NC†
2026	European Le Mans Series - LMP2	Vector Sport	6	0	0	0	0	44	8th
2026	24 Hours of Le Mans - LMP2	Vector Sport	1	0	0	0	0	N/A	4th
2026	European Endurance Prototype Cup	DB Autosport by MB Performance	1	0	0	0	0	0.5*	*

* Season still in progress.
† As Lomko was a guest driver, he was ineligible to score points.

=== Complete French F4 Championship results ===
(key) (Races in bold indicate pole position) (Races in italics indicate fastest lap)

Year	1	2	3	4	5	6	7	8	9	10	11	12	13	14	15	16	17	18	19	20	21	DC	Points
2019	NOG; 1	NOG; 2	NOG; 3	PAU; 1	PAU; 2	PAU; 3	SPA; 1	SPA; 2	SPA; 3	LÉD; 1	LÉD; 2	LÉD; 3	HUN; 1 Ret	HUN; 2; 17	HUN; 3; 10	MAG; 1	MAG; 2	MAG; 3	LEC; 1; 9	LEC; 2; 7	LEC; 3; 15	NC	—

=== Complete Italian F4 Championship results ===
(key) (Races in bold indicate pole position) (Races in italics indicate fastest lap)

Year	Team	1	2	3	4	5	6	7	8	9	10	11	12	13	14	15	16	17	18	19	20	21	DC	Points
2020	US Racing	MIS; 1	MIS; 2	MIS; 3	IMO1; 1	IMO1; 2	IMO1; 3	RBR; 1 Ret	RBR; 2 DNS	RBR; 3 DNS	MUG; 1	MUG; 2	MUG; 3	MNZ; 1	MNZ; 2	MNZ; 3	IMO2; 1; 15	IMO2; 2; 13	IMO2; 3; 17	VLL; 1	VLL; 2	VLL; 3	34th	0
2021	US Racing	LEC; 1; 4	LEC; 2; 6	LEC; 3; 3	MIS; 1	MIS; 2	MIS; 3	VLL; 1; 9	VLL; 2 Ret	VLL; 3 WD	IMO; 1	IMO; 2	IMO; 3	RBR; 1	RBR; 2	RBR; 3	MUG; 1	MUG; 2	MUG; 3	MNZ; 1 Ret	MNZ; 2; 13	MNZ; 3; 7	11th	43

=== Complete ADAC Formula 4 Championship results ===
(key) (Races in bold indicate pole position) (Races in italics indicate fastest lap)

Year	Team	1	2	3	4	5	6	7	8	9	10	11	12	13	14	15	16	17	18	19	20	21	Pos	Points
2020	US Racing	LAU1; 1; 6	LAU1; 2; 6	LAU1; 3 Ret	NÜR1; 1; 6	NÜR1; 2; 15	NÜR1; 3 DSQ	HOC; 1; 8	HOC; 2; 10	HOC; 3; 11	NÜR2; 1; 8	NÜR2; 2; 8	NÜR2; 3; 1	RBR; 1; 7	RBR; 2; 7	RBR; 3; 4	LAU2; 1; 1	LAU2; 2 Ret	LAU2; 3; 10	OSC; 1; 6	OSC; 2; 4	OSC; 3; 10	8th	133
2021	US Racing	RBR; 1; 9	RBR; 2; 12	RBR; 3 NC	ZAN; 1; 7	ZAN; 2; 10	ZAN; 3 Ret	HOC1; 1; 5	HOC1; 2; 6	HOC1; 3; 3	SAC; 1; 5	SAC; 2; 7	SAC; 3; 1	HOC2; 1; 3	HOC2; 2; 6	HOC2; 3; 7	NÜR; 1; 3	NÜR; 2; 9	NÜR; 3; 10				6th	133

=== Complete Formula 4 UAE Championship results ===
(key) (Races in bold indicate pole position) (Races in italics indicate fastest lap)

Year	Team	1	2	3	4	5	6	7	8	9	10	11	12	13	14	15	16	17	18	19	20	Pos	Points
2021	BWT Mücke Motorsport	DUB1; 1	DUB1; 2	DUB1; 3	DUB1; 4	YMC1; 1	YMC1; 2	YMC1; 3	YMC1; 4	DUB2; 1	DUB2; 2	DUB2; 3	DUB2; 4	YMC2; 1	YMC2; 2	YMC2; 3	YMC2; 4	**DUB3**; **1**; 6	DUB3; 2; 1	DUB3; 3; 1	DUB3; 4; 6	12th	66

=== Complete Formula Regional Asian Championship results ===
(key) (Races in bold indicate pole position) (Races in italics indicate fastest lap)

Year	Team	1	2	3	4	5	6	7	8	9	10	11	12	13	14	15	Pos	Points
2022	Hitech Grand Prix	ABU1; 1	ABU1; 2	ABU1; 3	DUB1; 1	DUB1; 2	DUB1; 3	DUB2; 1	DUB2; 2	DUB2; 3	DUB3; 1	DUB3; 2	DUB3; 3	ABU2; 1; 21	ABU2; 2; 15	ABU2; 3; 26	34th	0

=== Complete Euroformula Open Championship results ===
(key) (Races in bold indicate pole position) (Races in italics indicate fastest lap)

Year	Team	1	2	3	4	5	6	7	8	9	10	11	12	13	14	15	16	17	18	19	20	21	22	23	24	25	26	Pos	Points
2022	CryptoTower Racing	EST; 1; 2	EST; 2; 11	EST; 3; 5	PAU; 1; 3	PAU; 2; 1	LEC; 1; 2	LEC; 2; 3	LEC; 3; 3	SPA; 1; 4	SPA; 2; 3	SPA; 3; 3	**HUN**; **1**; 2	HUN; 2; 5	HUN; 3; 5	IMO; 1; 2	IMO; 2; 1	IMO; 3; 5	RBR; 1; 3	RBR; 2; 1	RBR; 3; 3*	**MNZ**; **1**; 1	MNZ; 2; 2	MNZ; 3; 1*	CAT; 1; 6	CAT; 2; 1	CAT; 3; 2	2nd	416

=== Complete Asian Le Mans Series results ===
(key) (Races in bold indicate pole position) (Races in italics indicate fastest lap)

Year	Team	Class	Car	Engine	1	2	3	4	5	6	Pos.	Points
2023	CD Sport	LMP3	Ligier JS P320	Nissan VK56DE 5.6L V8	DUB; 1; 7	DUB; 2; 5	ABU; 1 Ret	ABU; 2; 9			9th	18
2023–24	Cool Racing	LMP2	Oreca 07	Gibson GK428 4.2 L V8	SEP; 1	SEP; 2	DUB; Ret	ABU; 1; 12	ABU; 2; 10		19th	1
2024–25	Proton Competition	LMP2	Oreca 07	Gibson GK428 4.2 L V8	**SEP**; **1** DSQ	**SEP**; **2**; 4	**DUB**; **1**; 5	**DUB**; **2**; 4	**ABU**; **1**; 3	**ABU**; **2**; 6	5th	63
2025–26	Vector Sport RLR	LMP2	Oreca 07	Gibson GK428 4.2 L V8	SEP; 1; 8	SEP; 2; 15	DUB; 1; 4	DUB; 2; 10	ABU; 1; 10	ABU; 2; 14	16th	18

=== Complete European Le Mans Series results ===
(key) (Races in bold indicate pole position; results in italics indicate fastest lap)

Year	Entrant	Class	Chassis	Engine	1	2	3	4	5	6	Rank	Points
2023	Cool Racing	LMP2	Oreca 07	Gibson GK428 V8	**CAT**; 4	**LEC**; 4	ARA; 5	SPA; 3	POR; 4	ALG; 7	6th	69
2024	Inter Europol Competition	LMP2	Oreca 07	Gibson GK428 4.2 L V8	CAT; 6	LEC; 1	IMO; 4	SPA; 2	MUG; 7	ALG; 4	2nd	81
2025	Vector Sport	LMP2	Oreca 07	Gibson GK428 4.2 L V8	CAT; 3	LEC; 4	IMO; 12	SPA; 7	SIL; 3	ALG; 7	4th	54
2026	Vector Sport	LMP2	Oreca 07	Gibson GK428 4.2 L V8	CAT; 6	LEC; 5	IMO; 6	SPA; 9	SIL; 7	ALG; 5	8th	44

^{*} Season still in progress.

=== Le Mans 24 Hours results ===
Year	Team	Co-drivers	Car	Class	Laps	Pos.	Class pos.
2023	(Switzerland) Cool Racing	(France) Reshad de Gerus (France) Simon Pagenaud	Oreca 07-Gibson	LMP2	158	DNF	DNF
2024	(Poland) Inter Europol Competition	(France) Clément Novalak (Poland) Jakub Śmiechowski	Oreca 07-Gibson	LMP2	297	16th	**2nd**
2026	(United Kingdom) Vector Sport	(Republic of Ireland) Ryan Cullen (Brazil) Pietro Fittipaldi	Oreca 07-Gibson	LMP2	360	18th	4th

=== Complete Le Mans Cup results ===
(key) (Races in bold indicate pole position; results in italics indicate fastest lap)

Year	Entrant	Class	Chassis	1	2	3	4	5	6	7	Rank	Points
2025	M Racing	LMP3	Ligier JS P325	CAT	LEC	LMS; 1; 11	LMS; 2; 7	SPA	SIL	ALG	NC*	—*

== Notes ==
Sporting positions
Preceded by Casper Stevenson	Euroformula Open Championship; Rookies' Champion; 2022	Succeeded by Incumbent
