= Hadrien David =

French racing driver

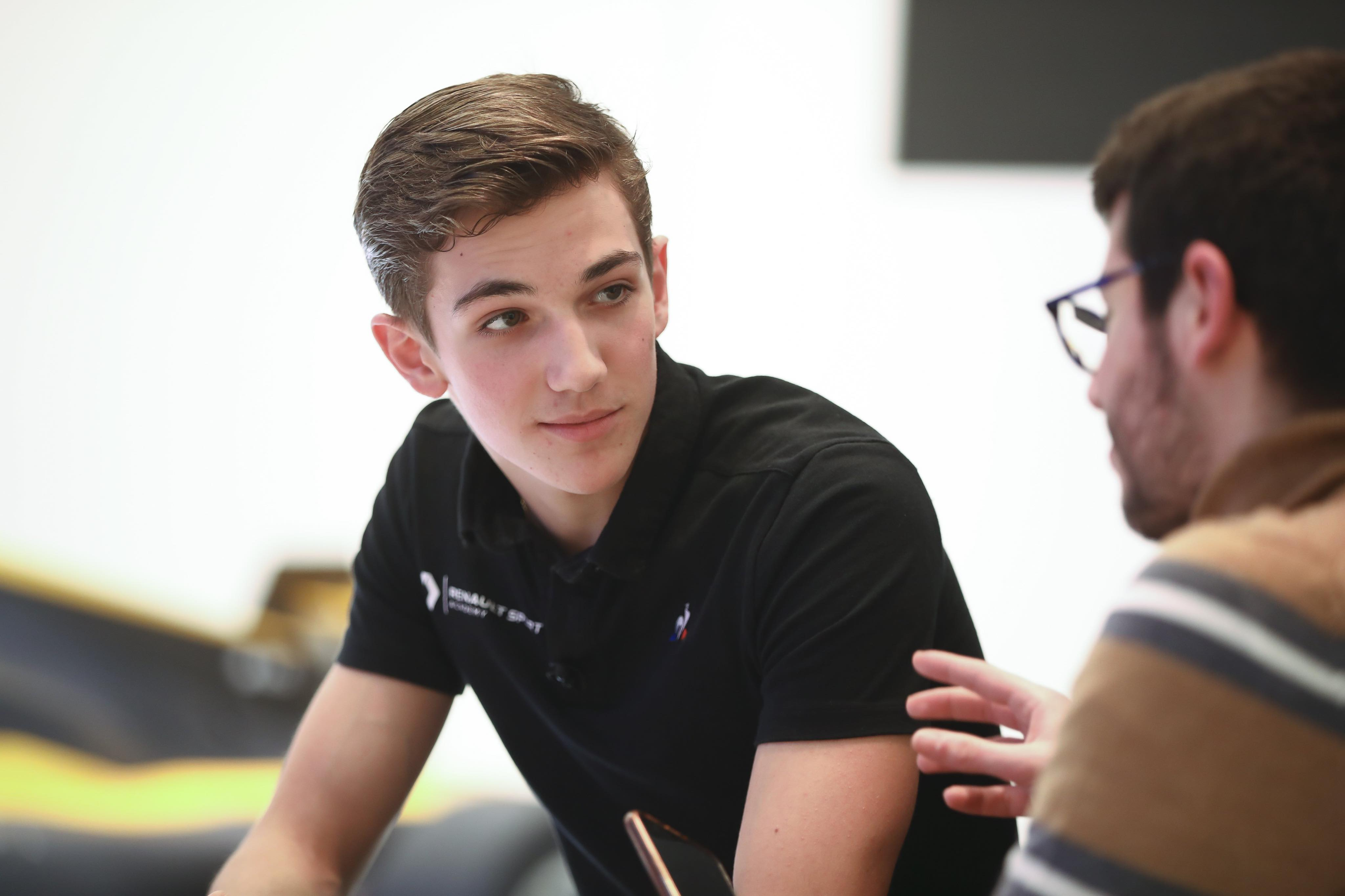
- David with Renault in 2019
- Nationality: (France) French
- Born: 26 February 2004 (age 22) Royan, France

FIA World Endurance Championship career
- Debut season: 2026
- Current team: Akkodis ASP Team
- Categorisation: FIA Silver
- Car number: 78
- Starts: 8
- Wins: 0
- Podiums: 1
- Poles: 2
- Fastest laps: 1
- Best finish: 14th in 2026

Previous series
- 2024–2025 2021–23 2020 2019, 2023 2019 2019: Le Mans Cup; FR European Championship; Formula Renault Eurocup; F4 SEA Championship; ADAC Formula 4 French F4 Championship

Championship titles
- 2019 2025: French F4 Championship; Le Mans Cup

Hadrien David (born 26 February 2004) is a French racing driver who currently competes in the FIA World Endurance Championship in the LMGT3 class for Akkodis ASP Team. He previously competed in the Le Mans Cup for R-ace GP where he won the 2025 title alongside Hugo Schwarze. David was the youngest FIA Formula 4 Champion when he won the French F4 Championship in 2019, at the age of 15. He was the 2021 Formula Regional European runner-up.

== Early career ==
=== Karting ===
David started karting at the age of eight on the Karting de Royan track in his hometown. He started in official competition in 2013 in the Mini-kart category and finished third in the Coupe de France, first in the Poitou-Charentes regional championship and second in the Center Region. In 2014, he finished fifth in the Coupe de France and the French Championship in the Minime category, David was also best rookie. That same year, he entered the 10-153 program of the French Federation of Automobile Sport (FFSA). In 2015, he won the French Cup, the Rotax Challenge and finished third in the French Championship in the same category and became a member of the French Karting Team.

In 2016, David made his international debut and became Belgian Champion in X30 Cadet. He again won the Coupe de France and became Champion of France Cadet. In two years, he participated in 30 national and international competitions, climbed 28 times on the podium and won 26 victories. From 2017, he improved his international presence and finished fourth in the European Championship and third in Genk, German Championship and in the OK-Junior category. In 2018, he won the WSK at La Conca in the same category and won a round of the German Championship in Genk in the OK category.

=== Lower formulae ===
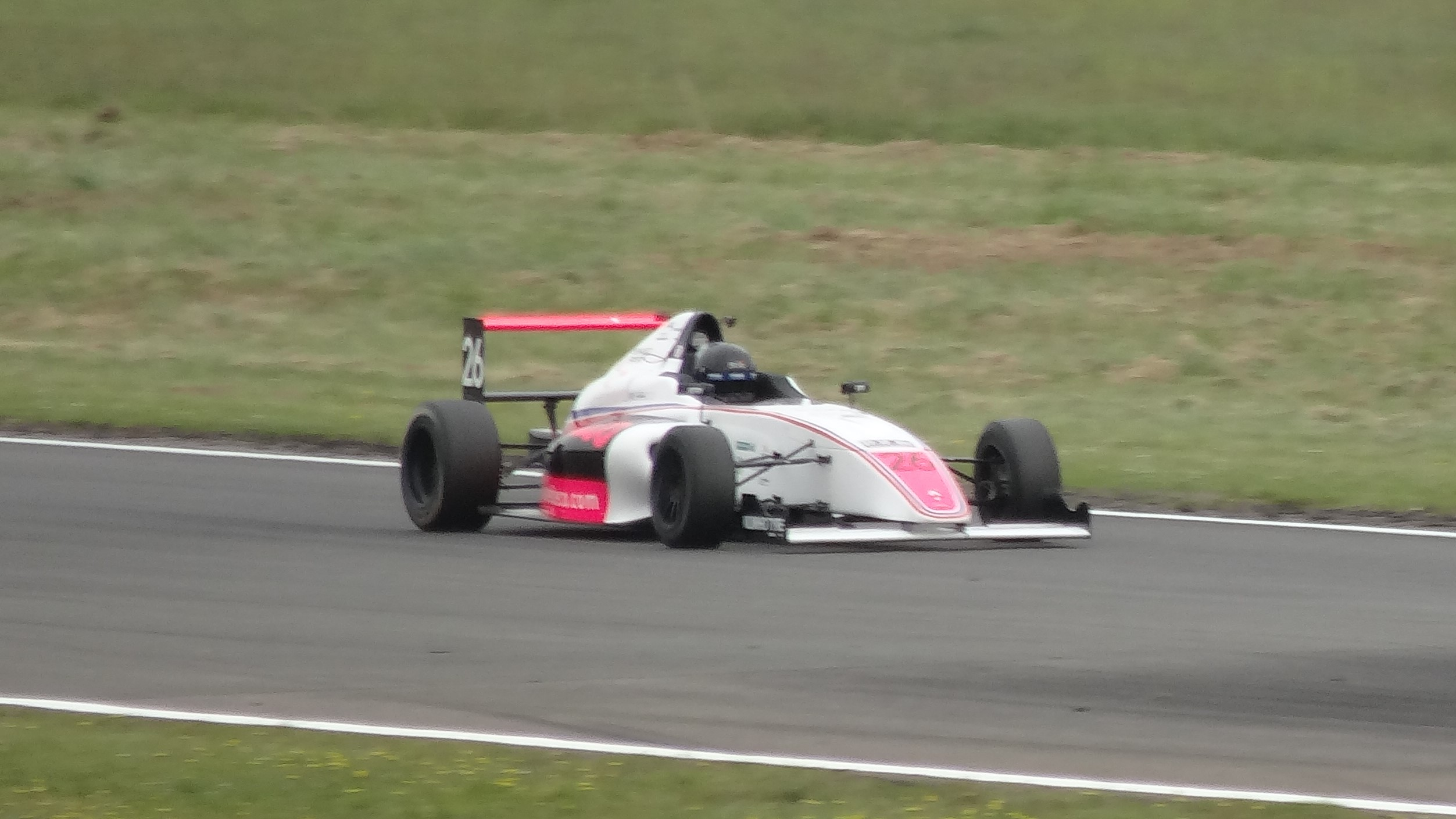
David racing in the 2019 French F4 Championship

In 2019, David joined the French F4 Championship. In preparation for this season, he also participated in the F4 SEA Championship, using the same Mygale M14-F4-Renault as the French championship. David won six of the eight races he participated in along with one second place and one seventh place.

In the opening round in the French F4 series at Nogaro, David won two of the three races, along with two poles and all three fastest laps, allowing him to take the lead in the championship. He won his third victory of the season at Pau. He won again at Lédenon, and despite some complicated races due to contact with other drivers resulting in him finishing ninth and 16th, David still lead the championship with Réunion's Reshad de Gerus being his only real championship rival. David won two new victories on the Hungaroring and from this point to the end of the season David didn't fail to step on the podium once with one more victory at Paul Ricard. This victory made David the youngest driver to win any FIA Formula 4 category at the age of fifteen with a total of 280 points.

David competed as a guest driver for R-ace GP in the 2019 ADAC Formula 4 Championship at Circuit Zandvoort and Nürburgring. David's best finish was seventh at the final race in Nürburgring, he then returned to the French F4 Championship where he was competing in full time.

=== Formula Renault Eurocup ===
In October 2019, David partook in the post-season test at Yas Marina with R-ace GP and MP Motorsport. The following January, it was confirmed David would make his debut in the upcoming season with the latter, partnering Franco Colapinto. Speaking of that opportunity before the season, Renault Academy boss Mia Sharizman remarked that the series was "an excellent platform to develop and test Hadrien David's talent". However, he experienced a slow first half of the season, which included a streak of four consecutive races without points. David would improve in the second half, scoring consistent points finishes and finishing on the podium in Imola. He ended up finishing tenth in the standings, seven positions behind teammate Franco Colapinto.

=== Formula Regional European Championship ===
==== 2021 ====
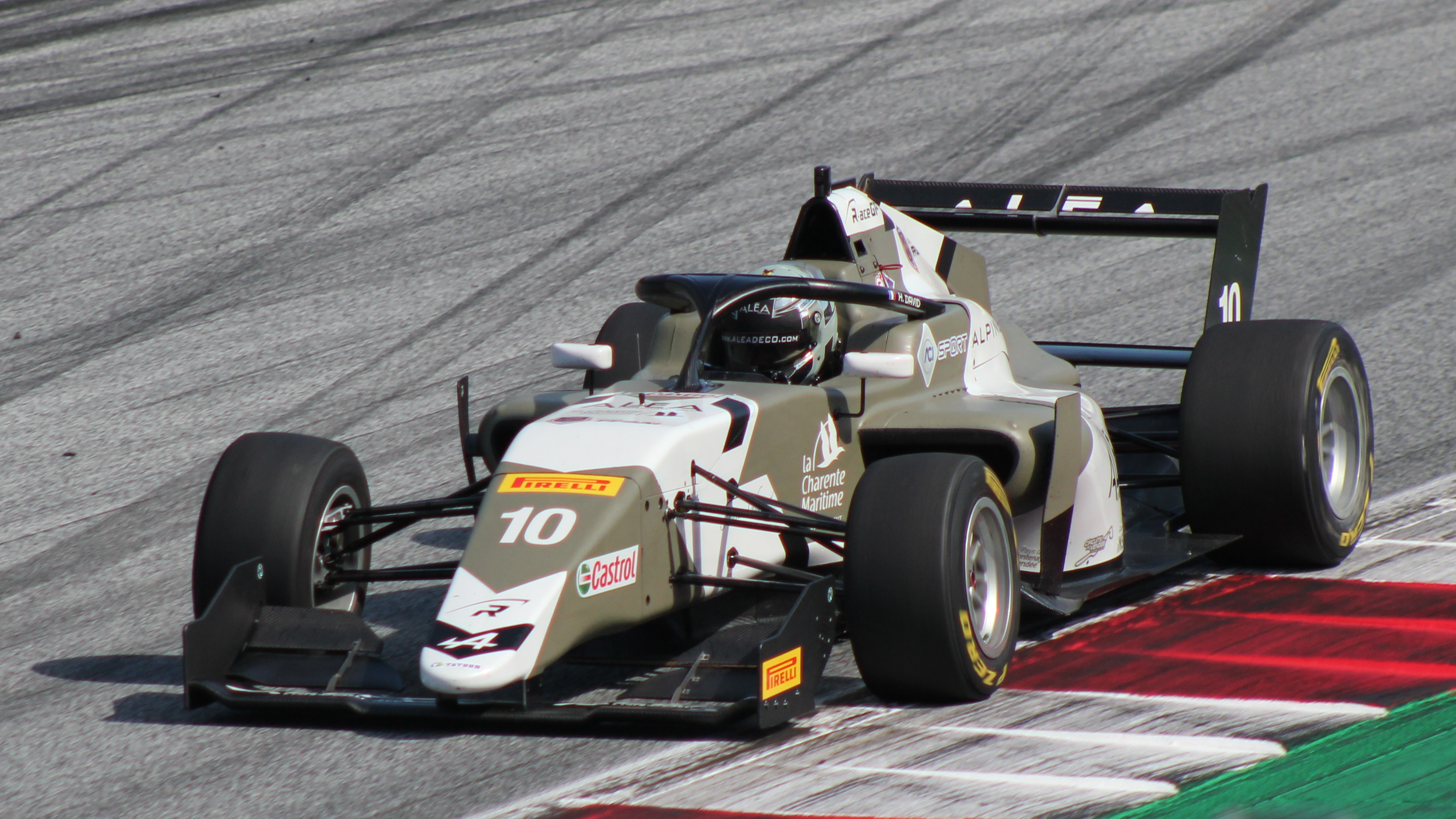
David racing in the 2021 Formula Regional European Championship at the Red Bull Ring.

In 2021, David competed in the Formula Regional European Championship for R-ace GP, alongside Léna Bühler, Zane Maloney and fellow countryman Isack Hadjar. David's first podium came in the first race, with third place in Imola. He finished race two in fourth. David eventually ended second in the standings.

==== 2022 ====
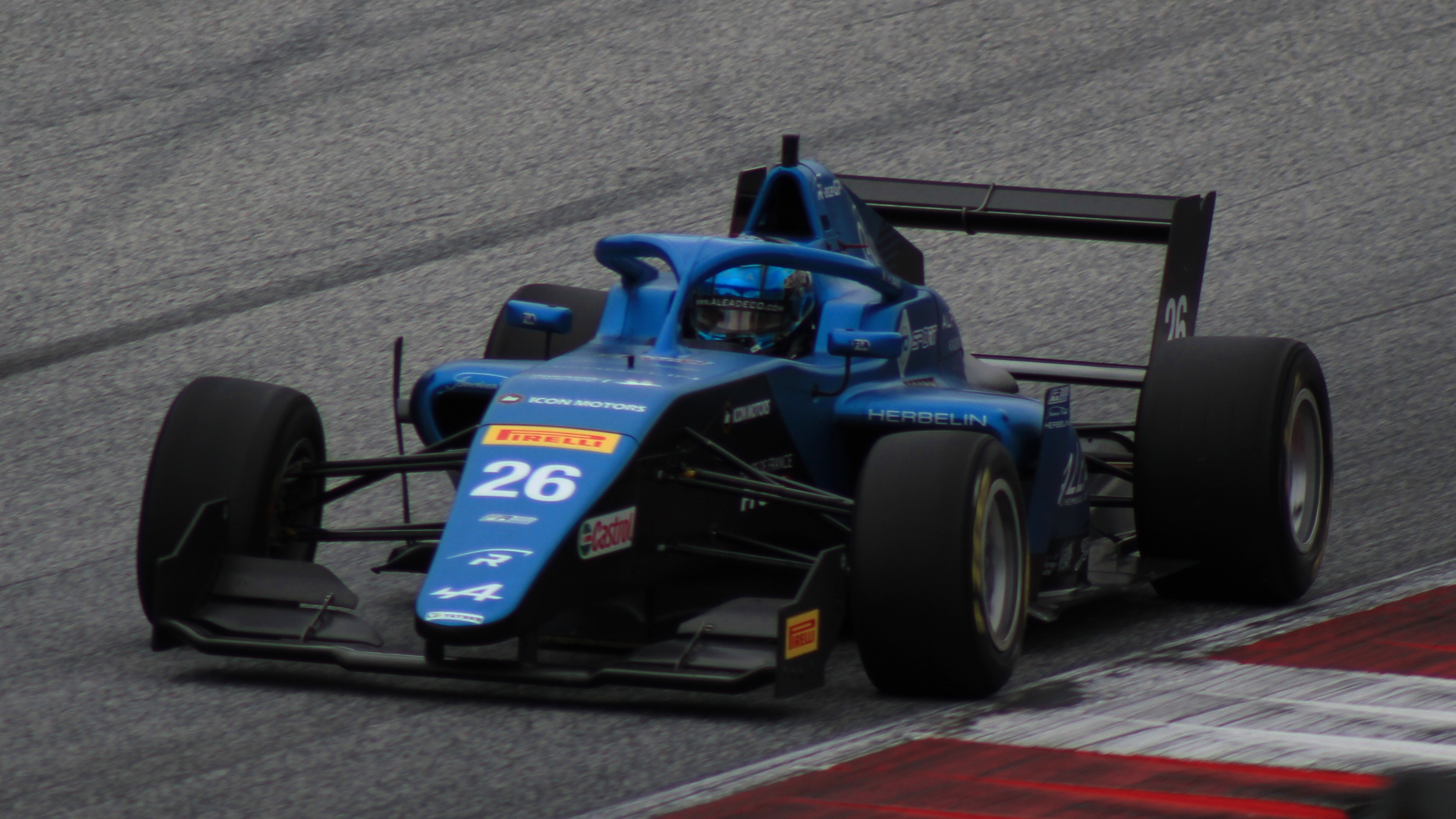
David racing in the 2022 Formula Regional European Championship at the Red Bull Ring.

David remained with R-ace GP for the 2022 Formula Regional European Championship, as he was unable to find the budget to step up to the 2022 FIA Formula 3 Championship. At the start of the season, he partook in the Formula Regional Asian Championship for the first two rounds, taking two victories and placing ninth in the standings.

==== 2023 ====
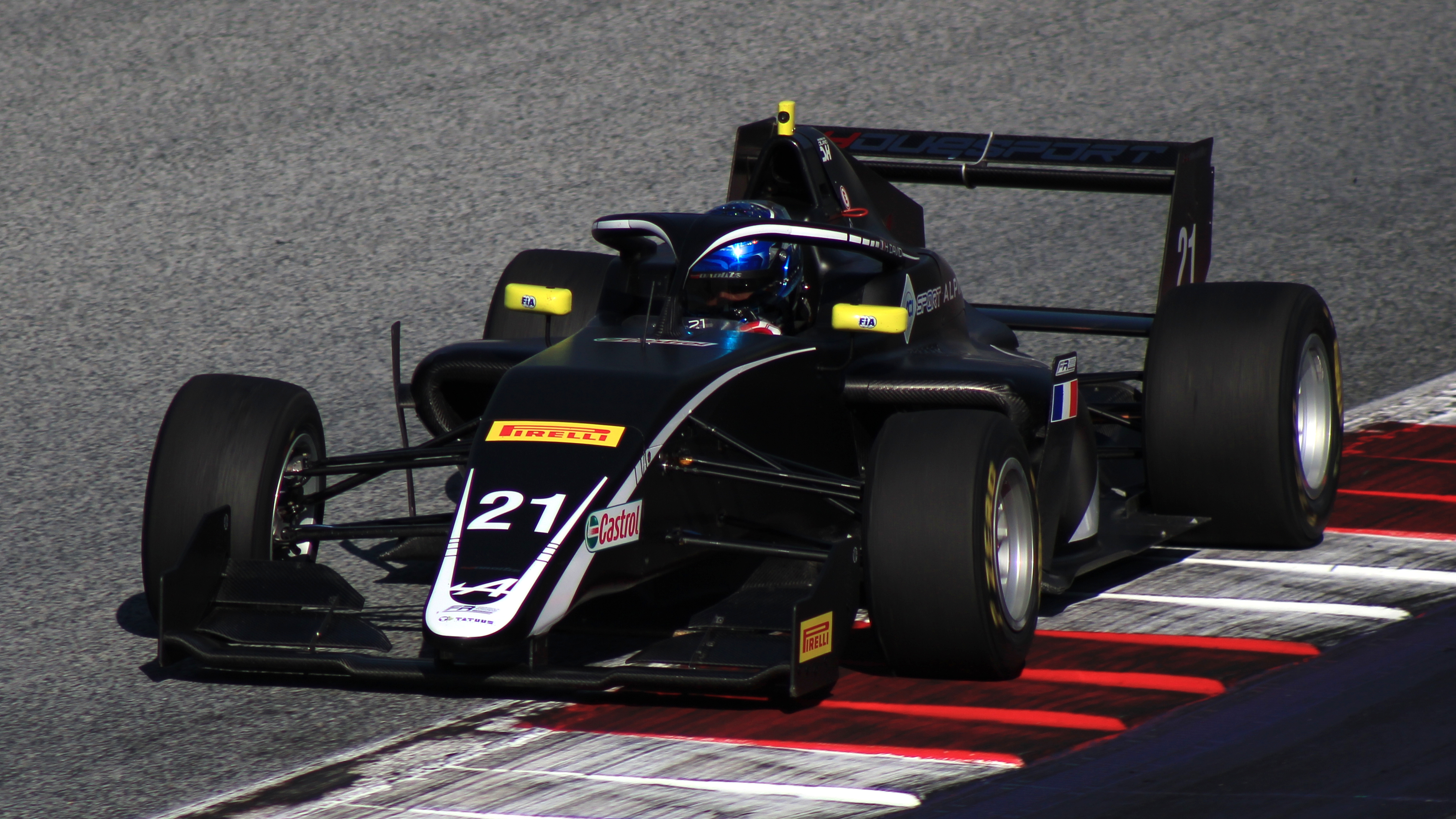
David racing in the 2023 Formula Regional European Championship at the Red Bull Ring.

David spent 2023 on the sidelines. However, he made a one-off return in the championship with ART Grand Prix for the Spa-Francorchamps as driver Charlie Wurz was having laryngitis. He again returned to the championship with Monolite Racing, to replace an absent Kirill Smal at the Red Bull Ring round.

=== FIA Formula 3 Championship ===
At the end of September 2022, David partook in the FIA Formula 3 post-season test with Carlin during the second day.

The following year in 2023, David partook in FIA Formula 3 post-season test again, this time with MP Motorsport.

=== Eurocup-3 ===
David joined Eurocup-3 for a one-off round at MotorLand Aragón in 2024, competing with Drivex.

=== Formula One ===
As reward for winning the French F4 title, David became a member of the Renault Sport Academy in January 2020. He was released following the academy's rebrand as Alpine Academy.

David was re-signed by the structure in March 2022, this time as a member of their new Alpine Affiliate programme. After just a year, David left the programme.

== Sportscar career ==
=== 2022: Debut ===
David made his sportscar debut in 2022, driving a round of the Ultimate Cup Series in the LMP3 class.

=== 2024: Le Mans Cup title assault ===
At the start of 2024, David joined Fabien Michal and R-ace GP for the final round of the Prototype Winter Series, where overtakes on Rik Koen and Danny Soufi during the second stint earned David his first LMP3 victory. This preceded David's assault at the 2024 Le Mans Cup, which he contested for R-ace alongside the bronze-ranked Michal. The pair finished second in the Barcelona season opener, David losing the lead to Tommy Foster late in the race. In Le Castellet, the combination of a spin by Michal prior to his pit stop and a mandatory pit stop handicap time penalty (given to Michal for his strong performance at Barcelona) conspired to demote David to eighth at the start of his stint. David charged forward forcefully, being the fastest driver on the circuit and progressing to third.

During the Road to Le Mans event, David once again recovered lost time during the pit stop in race 2 and finished third on track, before dropping to fifth thanks to a corner cutting penalty. Misfortune followed at Spa, where a pole by Michal was undone by a multi-car pileup on lap 1 which forced the R-ace entry to retire. Another Michal pole led to a dominant performance at Mugello, David crossing the line 42 seconds ahead of the second-placed car to claim the championship lead. In the final round at Portimão, a badly-timed safety car period dropped the team back to 14th; they lost out on the title by 5.5 points.

=== 2025: Le Mans Cup title, GT4 ===
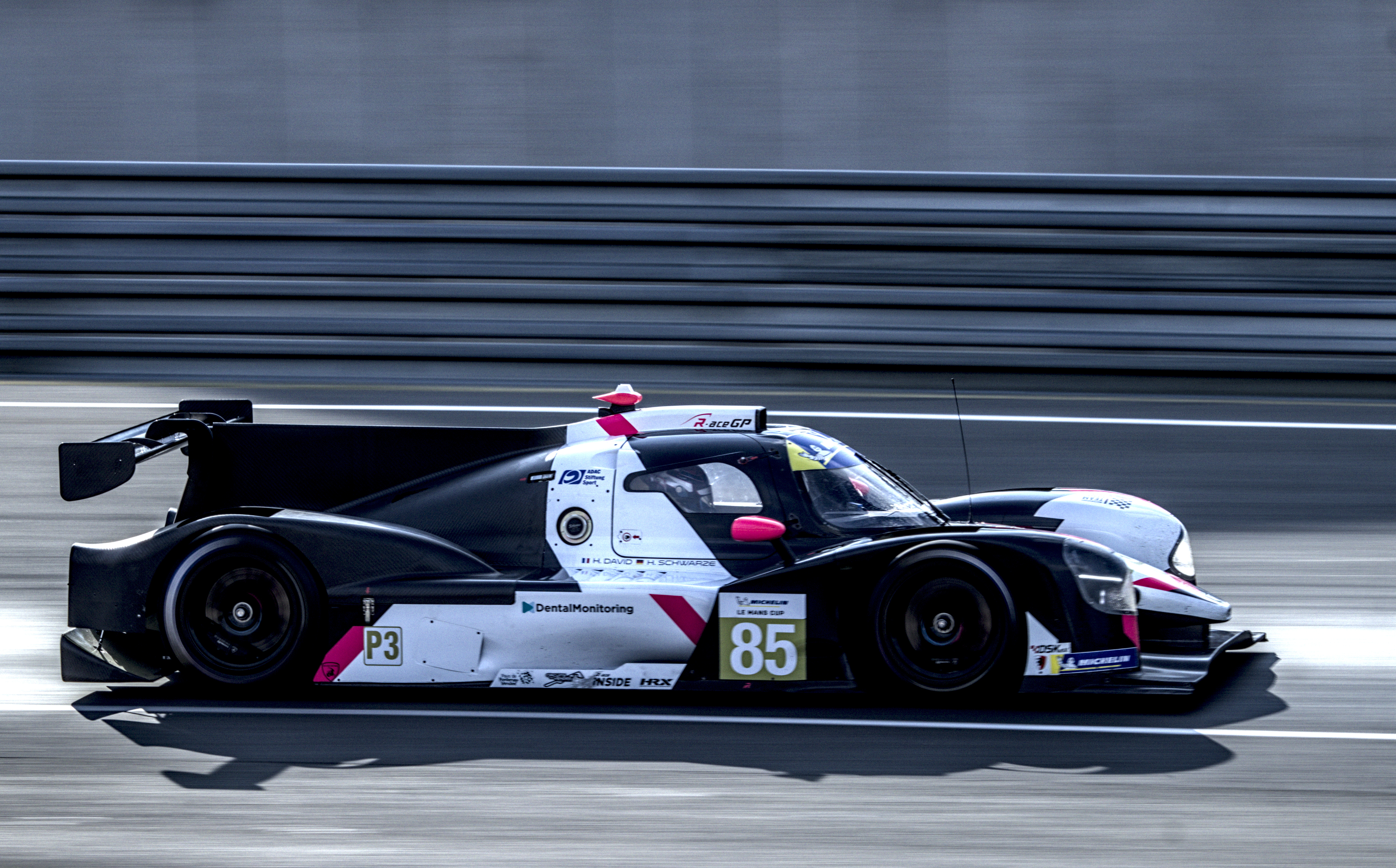
David led R-ace GP to the Le Mans Cup title in 2025.

David remained at R-ace for the 2025 Le Mans Cup season, partnering Hugo Schwarze in the new Duqueine D09 chassis. In round 1 at Barcelona, David recovered to eighth after Schwarze had received a drive-through penalty for avoidable contact. After finishing fifth in Le Castellet, David finished second in the first Road to Le Mans race, having been overtaken by eventual race winner Adrien Closmenil after the pit stop phase. In race 2 of the weekend, David and Schwarze finished second again, the latter being unable to get past Matteo Quintarelli on the final lap. In Spa, David claimed pole during a rainy qualifying session, before driving out a dominant gap to win the race by 14 seconds. With a tightly-fought win at Silverstone, where David successfully defended the lead against Romain Favre in a last-lap battle, David and Schwarze clinched the LMP3 title with one round to spare. David also secured victory in the final round, creating a 21-second gap after passing the leading Inter Europol Competition entry.

== Karting record ==
=== Karting career summary ===
Season	Series	Team	Position
2012	Championnat de France Regional Aquitaine — Mini Kart		1st
2012	Challenge Rotax Max France — Mini Kart		5th
2012	Sens Trophy — Mini Kart		NC†
2012	Championnat de France Regional Bourgogne Franche-Comte — Mini Kart		NC†
2013	Regional Series — Mini Kart		1st
2013	Sens Trophy — Mini Kart		1st
2013	Championnat de France Regional Centre — Mini Kart		2nd
2013	Coupe de France — Mini Kart		3rd
2013	Challenge Rotax Max France — Mini Kart		8th
2014	Stars of Karting — Minime		5th
2014	Championnat de France — Minime		5th
2014	Coupe de France— Minime		5th
2015	Trophée Oscar Petit— Minime		1st
2015	National Series Karting — Minime		1st
2015	Coupe de France — Minime		1st
2015	Rotax Max Challenge France — Minime		1st
2015	Championnat de France — Minime		3rd
2016	Championnat de Belgique — Cadet		1st
2016	Championnat de France — Cadet		1st
2016	Coupe de France — Cadet		1st
2016	National Series Karting — Cadet		1st
2016	Rotax Max Challenge Grand Finals — Mini Max		11th
2017	WSK Champions Cup — OKJ	Chiesa Corse	9th
2017	South Garda Winter Cup — OKJ	Chiesa Corse	26th
2017	Andrea Margutti Trophy — OKJ	Chiesa Corse	34th
2017	WSK Super Master Series — OKJ	Chiesa Corse	21st
2017	Coupe de France — OKJ	Chiesa Corse	2nd
2017	German Karting Championship — Junior	Chiesa Corse	3rd
2017	CIK-FIA European Championship — OKJ	Chiesa Corse	4th
2017	CIK-FIA World Championship — OKJ	Chiesa Corse	87th
2017	IAME International Final — X30 Junior	Chiesa Corse	19th
2018	South Garda Winter Cup — OKJ	Kosmic Racing Departement	15th
2018	WSK Super Master Series — OKJ	Kosmic Racing Departement	7th
2018	German Karting Championship — Senior	Kosmic Racing Departement	NC
2018	CIK-FIA European Championship — OKJ	Kosmic Racing Departement	12th

^{†} As David was a guest driver, he was ineligible to score points.

=== Complete Karting World Championship results ===
Year	Team	Car	Quali Heats	Main race
2017	(Italy) Chiesa Corse	OKJ	87th	DNQ

== Racing record ==
=== Racing career summary ===
Season	Series	Team	Races	Wins	Poles	F/Laps	Podiums	Points	Position
2019	French F4 Championship	FFSA Academy	21	7	9	7	14	281	**1st**
2019	Formula 4 South East Asia Championship	Meritus GP	8	6	3	5	6	182	7th
2019	ADAC F4 Championship	R-ace GP	6	0	0	0	0	—N/a	NC†
2020	Formula Renault Eurocup	MP Motorsport	20	0	0	0	1	71	10th
2021	Formula Regional European Championship	R-ace GP	20	2	1	2	9	209	**2nd**
2022	Formula Regional Asian Championship	3Y Technology by R-ace GP	6	2	1	3	2	64	9th
2022	Formula Regional European Championship	R-ace GP	20	3	3	4	7	224	4th
2022	Italian F4 Championship	R-ace GP	2	0	0	0	0	10	18th
2022	Ultimate Cup Series - Proto P3	CD Sport	1	0	0	0	0	0	NC
2023	Formula Regional European Championship	ART Grand Prix	2	0	0	0	0	0	29th
2023	Formula Regional European Championship	Monolite Racing	4	0	0	0	0	0	29th
2023	Formula 4 South East Asia Championship	R-ace GP	5	3	2	0	3	75	**3rd**
2023	Macau Formula 4 Race	R-ace GP	2	0	0	0	0	—N/a	7th
2024	Le Mans Cup - LMP3	R-ace GP	7	1	1	1	3	68	**2nd**
2024	Prototype Winter Series - Class 3	R-ace GP	1	1	1	0	1	9.29	12th
2024	Ultimate Cup Series - Proto P3	R-ace GP	0	0	0	0	0	0	NC
2024	Eurocup-3	DXR by Drivex	2	0	0	0	0	8	18th
2025	Le Mans Cup - LMP3	R-ace GP	7	3	3	2	5	116	**1st**
2025	GT4 European Series - Silver	TGR Team Matmut Évolution	12	3	1	0	7	158	**2nd**
2026	FIA World Endurance Championship - LMGT3	Akkodis ASP Team	8	0	2	1	1	41	14th
2026	Nürburgring Langstrecken-Serie - SP10	Toyota Racing United	1	0	0	0	0	—N/a	NC†

^{†} As David was a guest driver, he was ineligible to score points.

=== Complete French F4 Championship results ===
(key) (Races in bold indicate pole position) (Races in italics indicate fastest lap)

Year	1	2	3	4	5	6	7	8	9	10	11	12	13	14	15	16	17	18	19	20	21	Pos	Points
2019	**NOG**; **1**; 1	NOG; 2; 4	**NOG**; **3**; 1	PAU; 1; 2	PAU; 2 Ret	PAU; 3; 1	**SPA**; **1** Ret	SPA; 2; 6	**SPA**; **3**; 2	**LÉD**; **1**; 1	LÉD; 2; 9	**LÉD**; **3**; 16	**HUN**; **1**; 1	HUN; 2 Ret	**HUN**; **3**; 1	MAG; 1; 2	MAG; 2; 3	MAG; 3; 2	**LEC**; **1**; 1	LEC; 2; 3	**LEC**; **3**; 2	1st	280

=== Complete Formula 4 South East Asia Championship results ===
(key) (Races in bold indicate pole position) (Races in italics indicate fastest lap)

Year	Team	1	2	3	4	5	6	7	8	9	10	11	12	13	14	15	16	17	18	19	20	21	22	23	24	25	26	27	28	29	30	31	32	33	34	35	36	37	38	39	40	Pos	Points
2019	Meritus GP	SEP1; 1; 1	SEP1; 2; 7	**SEP1**; **3**; 1	**SEP1**; **4**; 1	SEP2; 1 DNS	SEP2; 2 DNS	SEP2; 3 DNS	SEP2; 4 DNS	BUR1; 1	BUR1; 2	BUR1; 3	BUR1; 4	BUR2; 1	BUR2; 2	BUR2; 3	BUR2; 4	MAD1; 1	MAD1; 2	MAD1; 3	MAD1; 4	MAD2; 1	MAD2; 2	MAD2; 3	MAD2; 4	**SEP3**; **1**; 1	SEP3; 2; 1	SEP3; 3; 1	**SEP3**; **4**; 2	SEP4; 1	SEP4; 2	SEP4; 3	SEP4; 4	SEP5; 1	SEP5; 2	SEP5; 3	SEP5; 4	SEP6; 1	SEP6; 2	SEP6; 3	SEP6; 4	7th	195
2023	R-ace GP	ZZIC1; 1	ZZIC1; 2	ZZIC1; 3	MAC; 1 Ret	MAC; 2; 7	**SEP1**; **1**; 1	SEP1; 2; 1	**SEP1**; **3**; 1	SEP2; 1	SEP2; 2	SEP2; 3																														3rd	75

=== Complete ADAC Formula 4 Championship results ===
(key) (Races in bold indicate pole position) (Races in italics indicate fastest lap)

Year	Team	1	2	3	4	5	6	7	8	9	10	11	12	13	14	15	16	17	18	19	20	Pos	Points
2019	R-ace GP	OSC; 1	OSC; 2	OSC; 3	RBR; 1	RBR; 2	RBR; 3	HOC1; 1	HOC1; 2	ZAN; 1 Ret	ZAN; 2; 16	ZAN; 3; 10	NÜR; 1; 8	NÜR; 2; 11	NÜR; 3; 7	HOC2; 1	HOC2; 2	HOC2; 3	SAC; 1	SAC; 2	SAC; 3	NC	-

=== Complete Formula Renault Eurocup results ===
(key) (Races in bold indicate pole position) (Races in italics indicate fastest lap)

Year	Team	1	2	3	4	5	6	7	8	9	10	11	12	13	14	15	16	17	19	19	20	Pos	Points
2020	MP Motorsport	MNZ; 1; 7	MNZ; 2; 6	IMO; 1; 9	IMO; 2; 12	NÜR; 1; 14	NÜR; 2; 7	MAG; 1 Ret	MAG; 2; 13	ZAN; 1; 16	ZAN; 2; 11	CAT; 1; 5	CAT; 2; 6	SPA; 1; 8‡	SPA; 2; 14	IMO; 1; 6	IMO; 2; 3	HOC; 1; 10	HOC; 2 Ret	LEC; 1; 9	LEC; 2 Ret	10th	71

^{‡} Half points awarded as less than 75% of race distance was completed.

=== Complete Formula Regional European Championship results ===
(key) (Races in bold indicate pole position) (Races in italics indicate fastest lap)

Year	Team	1	2	3	4	5	6	7	8	9	10	11	12	13	14	15	16	17	18	19	20	DC	Points
2021	R-ace GP	IMO; 1; 3	IMO; 2; 4	CAT; 1; 12	CAT; 2 Ret	MCO; 1; 4	MCO; 2; 3	LEC; 1; 1	LEC; 2; 10	ZAN; 1; 3	ZAN; 2; 12	SPA; 1; 2	SPA; 2; 3	RBR; 1; 2	RBR; 2 Ret	VAL; 1; 7	VAL; 2; 6	MUG; 1; 23	MUG; 2; 6	**MNZ**; **1**; 1	MNZ; 2; 3	2nd	209
2022	R-ace GP	MNZ; 1; 4	MNZ; 2; 7	IMO; 1; 10	IMO; 2; 4	**MCO**; **1**; 1	MCO; 2; 2	LEC; 1; 6	LEC; 2; 4	ZAN; 1; 12	ZAN; 2; 7	HUN; 1; 8	**HUN**; **2**; 1	SPA; 1; 18	SPA; 2; 2	RBR; 1; 13	**RBR**; **2**; 1	CAT; 1; 2	CAT; 2; 2	MUG; 1; 8	MUG; 2; 4	4th	224
2023	ART Grand Prix	IMO; 1	IMO; 2	CAT; 1	CAT; 2	HUN; 1	HUN; 2	SPA; 1; 16†	SPA; 2; 4†	MUG; 1	MUG; 2	LEC; 1	LEC; 2									29th	0
2023	Monolite Racing													RBR; 1; 20	RBR; 2; 14	MNZ; 1 Ret	MNZ; 2; 15	ZAN; 1	ZAN; 2	HOC; 1	HOC; 2	29th	0

^{†} As David was a guest driver, he was ineligible to score points.

=== Complete Formula Regional Asian Championship results ===
(key) (Races in bold indicate pole position) (Races in italics indicate the fastest lap of top ten finishers)

Year	Entrant	1	2	3	4	5	6	7	8	9	10	11	12	13	14	15	DC	Points
2022	3Y by R-ace GP	ABU; 1 Ret	ABU; 2 Ret	ABU; 3; 9	DUB; 1; 1	DUB; 2; 4	**DUB**; **3**; 1	DUB; 1	DUB; 2	DUB; 3	DUB; 1	DUB; 2	DUB; 3	ABU; 1	ABU; 2	ABU; 3	9th	64

=== Complete Le Mans Cup results ===
(key) (Races in bold indicate pole position; results in italics indicate fastest lap)

Year	Entrant	Class	Chassis	1	2	3	4	5	6	7	Rank	Points
2024	R-ace GP	LMP3	Duqueine M30 - D08	**CAT**; 2	**LEC**; 3	LMS; 1; 21	LMS; 2; 5	**SPA**; Ret	**MUG**; 1	**ALG**; 14	2nd	68
2025	R-ace GP	LMP3	Duqueine D09	CAT; 8	LEC; 5	LMS; 1; 2	LMS; 2; 2	**SPA**; 1	**SIL**; 1	**ALG**; 1	1st	116

=== Complete Eurocup-3 results ===
(key) (Races in bold indicate pole position) (Races in italics indicate fastest lap)

Year	Team	1	2	3	4	5	6	7	8	9	10	11	12	13	14	15	16	17	DC	Points
2024	DXR by Drivex	SPA; 1	SPA; 2	RBR; 1	RBR; 2	POR; 1	POR; 2	POR; 3	LEC; 1	LEC; 2	ZAN; 1	ZAN; 2	ARA; 1; 6	ARA; 2; 21	JER; 1	JER; 2	CAT; 1	CAT; 2	18th	8

=== Complete GT4 European Series results ===
(key) (Races in bold indicate pole position) (Races in italics indicate fastest lap)

Year	Team	Car	Class	1	2	3	4	5	6	7	8	9	10	11	12	Pos	Points
2025	TGR Team Matmut Évolution	Toyota GR Supra GT4 Evo2	Silver	LEC; 1; 2	LEC; 2; 2	ZAN; 1; 40†	ZAN; 2; 2	SPA; 1 Ret	SPA; 2; 6	MIS; 1; 9	MIS; 2; 32†	NÜR; 1; 2	**NÜR**; **2**; 1	CAT; 1; 1	CAT; 2; 1	2nd	158

=== Complete FIA World Endurance Championship results ===
(key) (Races in bold indicate pole position; results in italics indicate fastest lap)

Year	Entrant	Class	Chassis	Engine	1	2	3	4	5	6	7	8	Rank	Points
2026	Akkodis ASP Team	LMGT3	Lexus RC F GT3	Lexus 2UR-GSE 5.4 L V8	IMO; 14	**SPA**; Ret	LMS; 2	SÃO; 14	COA; NC	FUJ; 9	CAT; 14	**MNZ**; 10	14th	41

=== Complete 24 Hours of Le Mans results ===
Year	Team	Co-Drivers	Car	Class	Laps	Pos.	Class Pos.
2026	(France) Akkodis ASP Team	(United Kingdom) Jack Hawksworth (Belgium) Tom Van Rompuy	Lexus RC F GT3	LMGT3	335	34th	2nd

Sporting positions
Preceded by Caio Collet	French F4 Championship; Champion; 2019	Succeeded by Ayumu Iwasa
