= 2019 French F4 Championship =

French motorsport season

The 2019 French F4 Championship was the ninth season to run under the guise of the French F4 Championship and the second season under the FIA Formula 4 regulations. The championship used Mygale M14-F4 chassis with an upgraded 2.0 litre engine. The series began on 20 April at Nogaro and ended on 13 October at Le Castellet. Hadrien David, who won seven races throughout the season, won the title, 57.5 points ahead of closest challenger Reshad de Gerus, who came out victorious on four occasions. Sixth-placed Enzo Valente won two races, and Nicky Hays, Victor Bernier, Gillian Henrion, Isack Hadjar, Ugo Gazil, Mikkel Grundtvig and Paul-Adrien Pallot all won one race respectively.

== Driver lineup ==
No.	Driver	Class	Rounds
1	(France) Pierre-François Duriani		All
3	(France) Gillian Henrion		All
4	(Japan) Ren Sato	G	6
4	(France) Enzo Joulié	G	7
5	(Belgium) Sten Van der Henst		All
6	(France) Isack Hadjar	J	All
7	(France) Jules Mettetal		All
8	(South Africa) Stuart White		All
9	(France) Victor Bernier	J	All
10	(France) Reshad de Gerus		All
11	(Russia) Vladislav Lomko	G	5, 7
12	(France) Ugo Gazil		All
14	(France) Sami Meguetounif	G	7
22	(France) Paul-Adrien Pallot	J	All
24	(France) Mathis Poulet		All
26	(France) Hadrien David		All
27	(Japan) Kakunoshin Ohta	G	6
27	(France) Esteban Masson	G	7
33	(France) Evan Spenle		All
35	(United States) Bryson Lew		All
38	(Sweden) Simon Ohlin		All
43	(Denmark) Mikkel Grundtvig		All
48	(France) Enzo Valente		All
51	(United States) Nicky Hays		All
85	(Denmark) Valdemar Eriksen		1–3, 5–7

Icon	Status
J	Drivers that compete for the Junior Championship
G	Guest drivers ineligible for Drivers' Championship

== Race calendar ==
A seven round calendar taking place in 3 countries is published on the FFSA Academy website.

Round		Circuit	Date	Pole position	Fastest lap	Winning driver	Junior Winner
1	R1	(France) Circuit Paul Armagnac, Nogaro	21 April	(France) Hadrien David	(France) Hadrien David	(France) Hadrien David	(France) Isack Hadjar
1	R2	(France) Circuit Paul Armagnac, Nogaro	21 April		(France) Hadrien David	(France) Ugo Gazil	(France) Victor Bernier
1	R3	(France) Circuit Paul Armagnac, Nogaro	22 April	(France) Hadrien David	(France) Hadrien David	(France) Hadrien David	(France) Victor Bernier
2	R1	(France) Circuit de Pau, Pau	18 May	(South Africa) Stuart White	(France) Reshad de Gerus	(France) Reshad de Gerus	(France) Isack Hadjar
2	R2	(France) Circuit de Pau, Pau	18 May		(France) Enzo Valente	(France) Enzo Valente	(France) Isack Hadjar
2	R3	(France) Circuit de Pau, Pau	19 May	(South Africa) Stuart White	(France) Reshad de Gerus	(France) Hadrien David	(France) Victor Bernier
3	R1	(Belgium) Circuit de Spa-Francorchamps, Spa	22 June	(France) Hadrien David	(France) Isack Hadjar	(France) Isack Hadjar	(France) Isack Hadjar
3	R2	(Belgium) Circuit de Spa-Francorchamps, Spa	23 June		(United States) Nicky Hays	(France) Paul-Adrien Pallot	(France) Paul-Adrien Pallot
3	R3	(Belgium) Circuit de Spa-Francorchamps, Spa	23 June	(France) Hadrien David	(United States) Nicky Hays	(France) Reshad de Gerus	(France) Isack Hadjar
4	R1	(France) Circuit de Lédenon, Lédenon	6 July	(France) Hadrien David	(France) Hadrien David	(France) Hadrien David	(France) Victor Bernier
4	R2	(France) Circuit de Lédenon, Lédenon	6 July		(Denmark) Mikkel Grundtvig	(Denmark) Mikkel Grundtvig	(France) Isack Hadjar
4	R3	(France) Circuit de Lédenon, Lédenon	7 July	(France) Hadrien David	(United States) Nicky Hays	(United States) Nicky Hays	(France) Isack Hadjar
5	R1	(Hungary) Hungaroring, Mogyoród	7 September	(France) Hadrien David	(France) Hadrien David	(France) Hadrien David	(France) Victor Bernier
5	R2	(Hungary) Hungaroring, Mogyoród	7 September		(United States) Nicky Hays	(France) Gillian Henrion	(France) Victor Bernier
5	R3	(Hungary) Hungaroring, Mogyoród	8 September	(France) Hadrien David	(France) Hadrien David	(France) Hadrien David	(France) Victor Bernier
6	R1	(France) Circuit de Nevers Magny-Cours, Magny-Cours	14 September	(France) Reshad de Gerus	(France) Reshad de Gerus	(France) Reshad de Gerus	(France) Victor Bernier
6	R2	(France) Circuit de Nevers Magny-Cours, Magny-Cours	14 September		(France) Hadrien David (Note: Guest driver Kakunoshin Ohta recorded the fastest lap of the race. The bonus point was awarded to David with the second best lap.)	(France) Evan Spenle	(France) Victor Bernier
6	R3	(France) Circuit de Nevers Magny-Cours, Magny-Cours	15 September	(France) Reshad de Gerus	(United States) Nicky Hays	(France) Reshad de Gerus	(France) Isack Hadjar
7	R1	(France) Circuit Paul Ricard, Le Castellet	12 October	(France) Hadrien David	(France) Hadrien David	(France) Hadrien David	(France) Victor Bernier
7	R2	(France) Circuit Paul Ricard, Le Castellet	12 October		(France) Jules Mettetal	(France) Enzo Valente (Note: Jules Mettetal won the race but his results from this round became invalid. The point for the fastest lap was not reallocated.)	(France) Victor Bernier
7	R3	(France) Circuit Paul Ricard, Le Castellet	13 October	(France) Hadrien David	(France) Victor Bernier	(France) Victor Bernier	(France) Victor Bernier

== Championship standings ==
Points system

Each driver dropped their worst round result. Points were awarded as follows:

Races	Position										Bonus	
Races	1st	2nd	3rd	4th	5th	6th	7th	8th	9th	10th	PP	FL
Races 1 & 3	25	18	15	12	10	8	6	4	2	1	**1**	1
Race 2	15	12	10	8	6	4	2	1	0	0	–	1

=== Drivers' standings – FFSA Academy ===
Pos	Driver	NOG (France)			PAU (France)			SPA (Belgium)			LÉD (France)			HUN (Note: Race 1 was stopped after 5 laps due to weather. Half points were awarded to top 10 finishers.) (Hungary)			MAG (France)			LEC (France)			Pts
1	(France) Hadrien David	**1**	4	**1**	2	Ret	1	**Ret**	6	**2**	**1**	9	**16**	**1**	Ret	**1**	2	3	2	**1**	2	**2**	281
2	(France) Reshad de Gerus	3	2	2	1	7	2	13	13	1	2	5	5	3	6	2	**1**	17	**1**	Ret	11	13	233.5
3	(United States) Nicky Hays	4	5	3	Ret	Ret	DNS	Ret	9	3	3	7	1	2	8	6	3	5	4	3	Ret	5	173
4	(France) Victor Bernier	9	6	12	Ret	Ret	8	3	7	12	4	10	4	4	3	3	4	4	15	2	3	1	154
5	(France) Gillian Henrion	7	3	5	6	3	7	9	3	6	6	6	6	9	1	9	5	7	DNS	11	6	3	129
6	(France) Enzo Valente	2	8	4	9	1	4	Ret	11	9	5	8	3	8	9	Ret	9	6	Ret	8	1	6	128
7	(France) Isack Hadjar	8	10	16	4	6	DNS	1	17	7	7	4	2	18	12	5	8	Ret	5	Ret	Ret	4	118
8	(France) Evan Spenle	19	12	19	8	2	Ret	5	Ret	5	11	18	17	5	4	4	10	1	7	6	4	12	103
9	(South Africa) Stuart White	6	7	7	**3**	5	**3**	2	8	11	8	3	7	11	10	12	17	10	9	16	18	Ret	97
10	(Belgium) Sten Van der Henst	11	13	10	Ret	11	5	4	4	14	9	2	10	10	2	8	6	8	3	20	14	Ret	87.5
11	(France) Ugo Gazil	10	1	17	Ret	8	9	7	2	13	13	11	18	6	7	7	Ret	Ret	16	4	8	Ret	63
12	(France) Jules Mettetal	5	9	18	Ret	10	6	14	12	4	16	14	9	7	5	Ret	16	Ret	6	DSQ	DSQ	DSQ	49
13	(Denmark) Mikkel Grundtvig	12	11	8	Ret	Ret	DNS	10	10	15	10	1	8	15	13	13	13	13	10	10	9	9	37
14	(France) Paul-Adrien Pallot	17	18	15	Ret	Ret	13	8	1	8	18	16	15	19	19	18	15	12	14	12	16	10	26
15	(Sweden) Simon Ohlin	15	17	14	Ret	12	11	11	15	17	14	13	12	12	11	14	14	16	13	7	5	8	20
16	(Denmark) Valdemar Eriksen	16	15	6	5	Ret	10	Ret	DNS	DNS				16	16	15	12	15	Ret	15	13	14	19
17	(France) Pierre-François Duriani	14	16	11	Ret	Ret	14	6	5	10	15	12	11	14	15	11	11	9	Ret	13	10	Ret	18
18	(France) Mathis Poulet	13	14	9	7	4	12	12	14	18	12	17	14	13	14	17	Ret	Ret	14	17	17	Ret	16
19	(United States) Bryson Lew	18	19	13	Ret	9	15	Ret	16	16	17	15	13	17	18	16	18	14	12	14	15	16	1
guest drivers ineligible to score points
—	(Japan) Kakunoshin Ohta																7	2	8				—
—	(France) Sami Meguetounif																			5	Ret	7	—
—	(Russia) Vladislav Lomko													Ret	17	10				9	7	15	—
—	(Japan) Ren Sato																19	11	11				—
—	(France) Esteban Masson																			18	12	11	—
—	(France) Enzo Joulié																			19	19	17	—

Colour	Result
Gold	Winner
Silver	Second place
Bronze	Third place
Green	Points classification
Blue	Non-points classification
Blue	Non-classified finish (NC)
Purple	Retired, not classified (Ret)
Red	Did not qualify (DNQ)
Red	Did not pre-qualify (DNPQ)
Black	Disqualified (DSQ)
White	Did not start (DNS)
White	Withdrew (WD)
White	Race cancelled (C)
Blank	Did not practice (DNP)
Blank	Did not arrive (DNA)
Blank	Excluded (EX)

**Bold** – Pole
Italics – Fastest Lap
† — Did not finish, but classified

=== Drivers' standings – FIA Formula 4 ===
Pos	Driver	NOG (France)			PAU (France)			SPA (Belgium)			LÉD (France)			HUN (Hungary)			MAG (France)			LEC (France)			Pts
1	(France) Hadrien David	1	4	1	2	Ret	1	Ret	5	2	1	8	13	1	16	1	2	2	2	1	2	1	274.5
2	(France) Reshad de Gerus	3	2	2	1	6	2	10	11	1	2	4	3	3	5	2	1	13	1	15	9	8	240.5
3	(United States) Nicky Hays	4	5	3	Ret	Ret	DNS	Ret	7	3	3	6	1	2	7	4	3	3	4	2	Ret	3	187
4	(France) Gillian Henrion	7	3	5	5	3	7	6	2	6	5	5	4	8	1	7	4	5	DNS	8	5	2	159
5	(France) Enzo Valente	2	7	4	8	1	4	Ret	9	7	4	7	2	7	8	15	6	4	Ret	6	1	4	152
6	(France) Evan Spenle	Ret	10	Ret	7	2	Ret	3	Ret	5	9	Ret	Ret	4	3	3	7	1	6	4	3	7	133
7	(South Africa) Stuart White	6	6	7	3	5	3	1	6	9	6	3	5	10	9	9	14	8	7	12	14	Ret	122.5
8	(Belgium) Sten van der Henst	9	11	10	Ret	10	5	2	3	11	7	2	8	9	2	6	5	6	3	14	11	Ret	113
9	(France) Ugo Gazil	8	1	14	Ret	7	8	5	1	10	11	9	Ret	5	6	5	Ret	Ret	11	3	6	Ret	89
10	(Denmark) Mikkel Grundtvig	10	9	8	Ret	Ret	DNS	7	8	12	8	1	6	14	11	10	10	9	8	7	7	6	61
11	(France) Jules Mettetal	5	8	15	Ret	9	6	11	10	4	14	12	7	6	4	16	13	Ret	5	DSQ	DSQ	DSQ	59
12	(France) Pierre-François Duriani	12	14	11	Ret	Ret	12	4	4	8	13	10	9	13	13	8	8	7	Ret	9	8	Ret	39
13	(Sweden) Simon Ohlin	13	15	13	Ret	11	10	8	13	14	12	11	10	11	10	11	11	12	10	5	4	5	35
14	(Denmark) Valdemar Eriksen	14	13	6	4	Ret	9	Ret	DNS	DNS				15	14	12	9	11	Ret	11	10	9	26
15	(France) Mathis Poulet	11	12	9	6	4	11	9	12	Ret	10	14	12	12	12	14	Ret	Ret	Ret	13	13	Ret	21
16	(United States) Bryson Lew	Ret	16	12	Ret	8	13	Ret	Ret	13	15	13	11	16	15	13	15	10	9	10	12	10	5

=== Juniors' standings ===
Pos	Driver	NOG (France)			PAU (France)			SPA (Belgium)			LÉD (France)			HUN (Hungary)			MAG (France)			LEC (France)			Pts
1	(France) Victor Bernier	2	1	1	Ret	Ret	1	2	2	3	1	2	2	1	1	1	1	1	3	1	1	1	330.5
2	(France) Isack Hadjar	1	2	3	1	1	Ret	1	Ret	1	2	1	1	2	2	2	2	Ret	1	Ret	Ret	2	282
3	(France) Paul-Adrien Pallot	3	3	2	Ret	Ret	2	3	1	2	3	3	3	3	3	3	3	2	2	2	2	3	253.5
