= Reshad de Gerus =

French racing driver (born 2003)

- de Gerus at Silverstone Circuit in 2026
- Nationality: (France) French
- Born: Reshad Jean de Gerus; 1 July 2003 (age 23) Sainte-Marie, Réunion

European Le Mans Series career
- Debut season: 2022
- Current team: Inter Europol Competition
- Categorisation: FIA Silver (2022); FIA Gold (2023–)
- Car number: 34
- Co-driver: Bijoy Garg
- Former teams: IDEC Sport, Cool Racing, Duqueine Team
- Starts: 16 (16 entries)
- Wins: 0
- Podiums: 2
- Poles: 2
- Fastest laps: 0
- Best finish: 6th (LMP2 Pro) in 2023, 2024

Previous series
- 2021 2020 2019 2018-19: FIA Formula 3 Championship; Formula Renault Eurocup; FIA Motorsport Games F4 Cup; French F4 Championship

Reshad Jean de Gerus (born 1 July 2003) is a French racing driver from Réunion, currently competing in the European Le Mans Series for Inter Europol Competition.

== Early career ==
=== French F4 Championship ===
De Gerus drove in the French F4 Championship from 2018 to 2019. In his debut season, he took part in the Junior category, finishing runner-up to Théo Pourchaire with four wins and sixteen podiums. In 2019, de Gerus competed in the full championship, where four wins, including one at the Pau Circuit, helped him to second in the standings.

=== FIA Motorsport Games ===
De Gerus represented Team France and the FFSA at the 2019 FIA Motorsport Games Formula 4 Cup where an Olympic style competition takes place with different categories of racing. De Gerus was driving in the Formula 4 Cup. After qualifying, he was in ninth, just over two seconds off the pace. For the qualifying race, he slipped back one place meaning Team France would start in tenth behind Team Russia. The race itself saw de Gerus finish fifth.

=== Formula Renault Eurocup ===
In January 2020, it was announced that de Gerus would compete in the Formula Renault Eurocup for British team Arden Motorsport alongside Alex Quinn and Ugo de Wilde. While his teammates both finished inside the top-ten in the standings, de Gerus would have a more difficult campaign, with only three points finishes seeing him end up 17th in the championship.

=== FIA Formula 3 Championship ===
De Gerus graduated to Formula 3 in 2021, racing alongside Logan Sargeant and Enzo Fittipaldi at Charouz Racing System. He left the team after twelve races, having taken a best result of 13th in Barcelona.

== Sportscar career ==
=== 2022 ===
In February 2022, it was announced that de Gerus has joined Duqueine Team for the European Le Mans Series campaign, racing for the French outfit alongside Richard Bradley and Memo Rojas. Following three rounds, where the team scored a best finish of sixth at Imola, de Gerus quit the series.

That year, de Gerus also made his debut at the 24 Hours of Le Mans, thus becoming the first driver from the French Overseas Department of Réunion to compete in the event.

=== 2023 ===
Having been upgraded from silver to gold-ranked status by the FIA, de Gerus returned to the ELMS in 2023, pairing up with José María López and Vladislav Lomko at Cool Racing. The season started well, with de Gerus taking his maiden pole position in sportscars at Barcelona. Despite another pole scored by López at the following round, the team would struggle to achieve results throughout the year, with the best finish being a lone podium in Spa-Francorchamps, which came about after a chaotic race in the LMP2 class. The trio ended up sixth in the standings.

Alongside Lomko and Simon Pagenaud, de Gerus drove for Cool in the Le Mans 24 Hours, though the race would end prematurely as he crashed at the Porsche Curves during the night.

=== 2024 ===
For the 2024 season, de Gerus remained in the ELMS, moving to IDEC Sport and driving alongside Job van Uitert and Paul Lafargue. After three successive fourth places to start off the season, de Gerus and van Uitert finished third at Spa, moving up to third place in the standings. However, a crash caused by the No. 55 GT Ferrari of Duncan Cameron forced the Frenchman to retire at Mugello, leaving the team out of the title hunt. De Gerus ended up sixth in the drivers' standings.

After van Uitert qualified second at Le Mans, de Gerus helped IDEC towards its first podium at the event, finishing third. Following the season, de Gerus was chosen by the ACO to take part in the 2024 FIA World Endurance Championship rookie test at the Bahrain International Circuit, where he drove the title-winning Toyota GR010 Hybrid.

=== 2025 ===
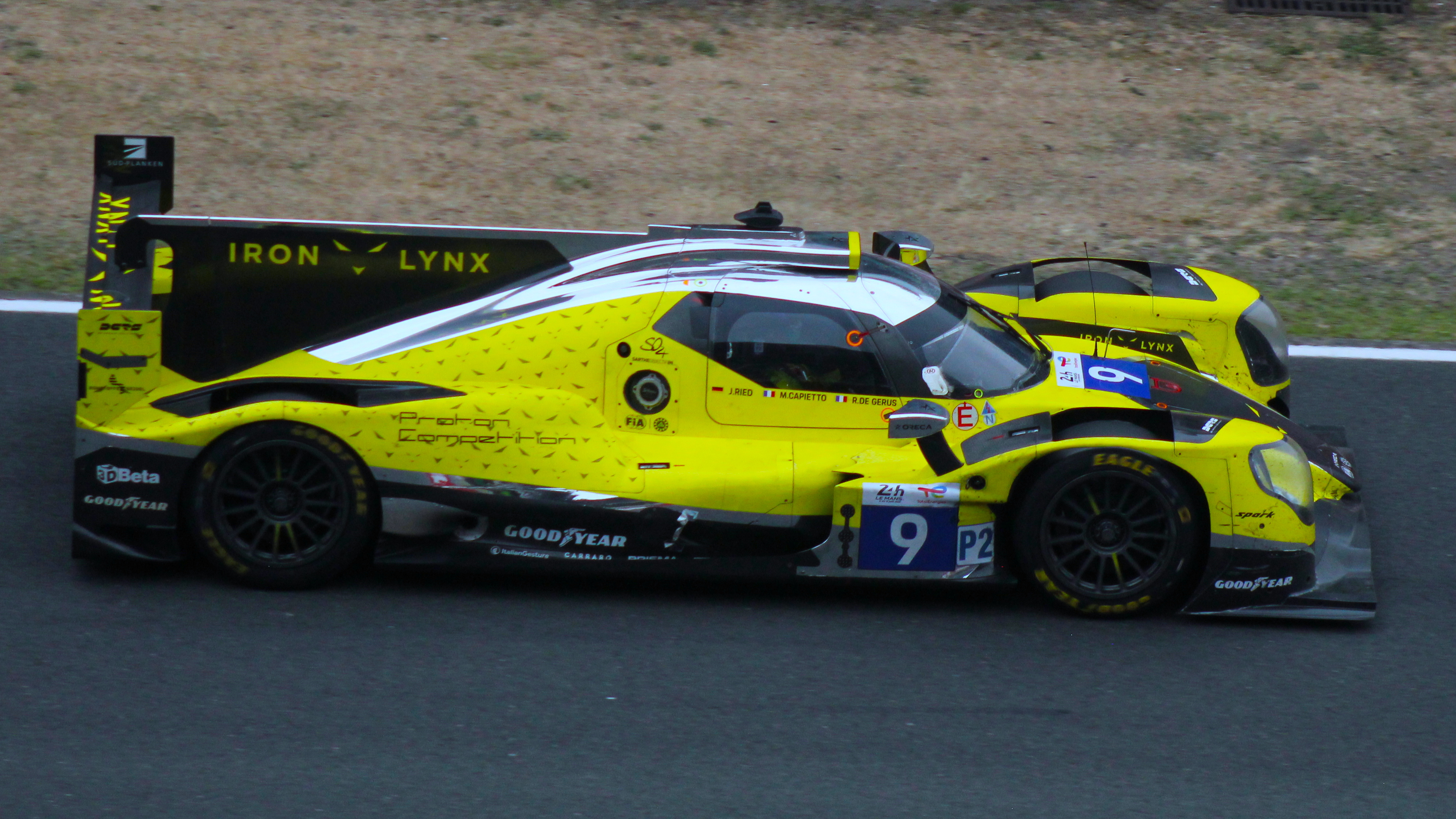
De Gerus' No. 9 car at the 2025 24 Hours of Le Mans

De Gerus joined Duqueine Team for the 2025 ELMS season, partnering sportscar rookies Roy Nissany and Francesco Simonazzi. At the opening round in Barcelona, de Gerus repeated his feat from 2023 and claimed pole. However, a gearbox issue during his stint forced the team to retire. Seventh at Paul Ricard and ninth in Imola sandwiched de Gerus's appearance at Le Mans, where he joined Macéo Capietto and Jonas Ried at Iron Lynx. After racing for second place for a large part of the event — and having briefly lost the position to Louis Delétraz in the evening — de Gerus and his teammates finished fourth in LMP2. De Gerus and the team scored their last points of the ELMS season with tenth place at Spa, before finishing 11th at Silverstone and retiring at Portimão. This led to him finishing last of the full-time LMP2 Pro entrants.

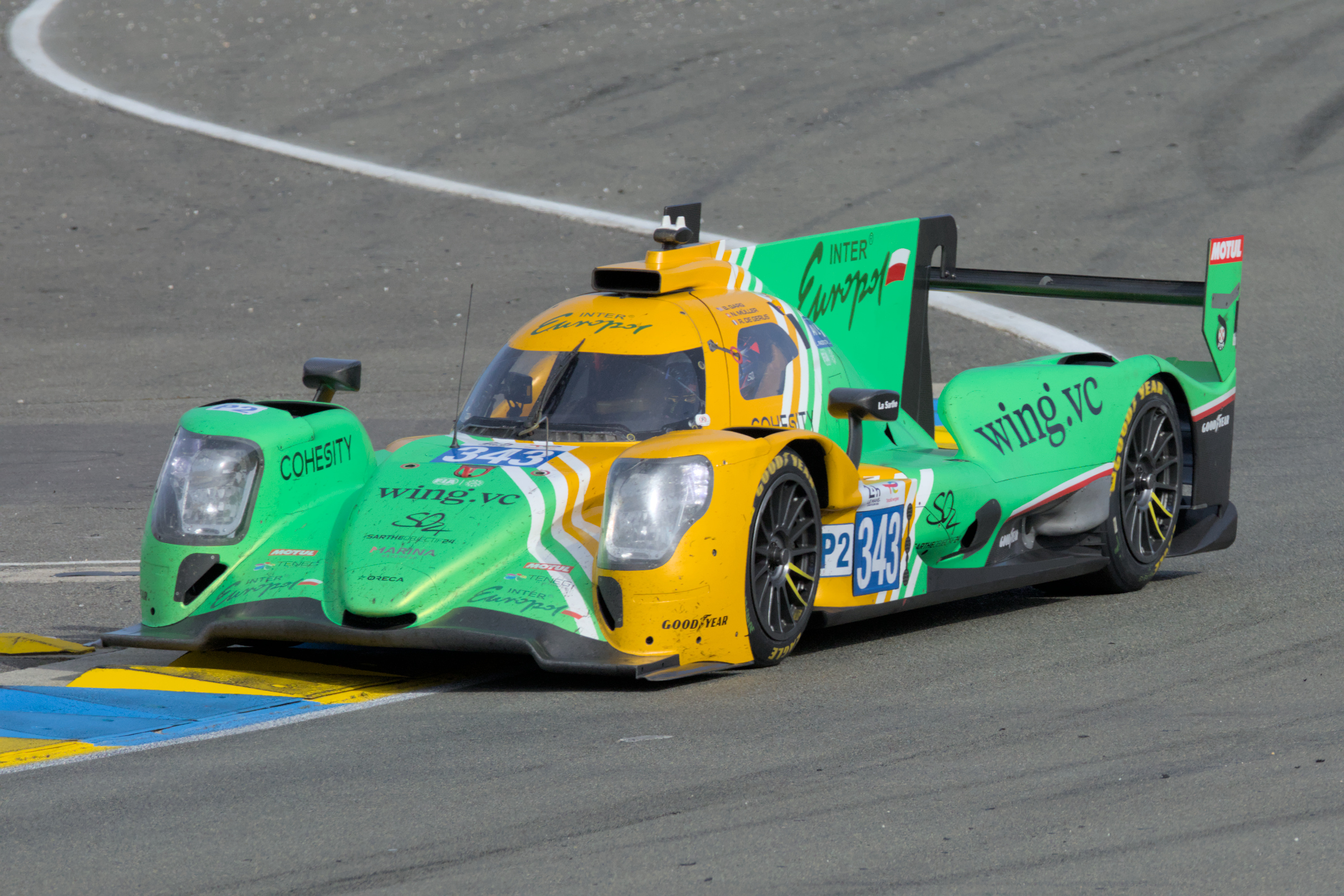
De Gerus finished second in the 2026 edition of the 24 Hours of Le Mans

=== 2026 ===
For the 2026 ELMS campaign, de Gerus partnered Bijoy Garg in the series' only two-driver lineup at Inter Europol Competition. He also took part in the 2026 24 Hours of Le Mans in LMP2 with Inter Europol Competition alongside Garg and Nico Müller, driving a car No. 343, finishing the race in second place, narrowly losing the victory to the sister car.

== Personal life ==
De Gerus has been acting as a mentor to Belgian driver Lorens Lecertua, the 2023 champion of the Alpine Elf Europa Cup.

== Karting record ==
=== Karting career summary ===
Season	Series	Team	Position
2010	Coupe de France — Mini Kart		52nd
2011	Coupe de France — Mini Kart		22nd
2013	Championnat de France — Minime		21st
2014	Championnat de France — Minime		9th
2014	Coupe de France — Minime		8th
2015	Trophée Oscar Petit — Cadet		7th
2015	National Series Karting — Cadet		11th
2015	Coupe de France — Cadet		25th
2016	IAME Finale Nationale — X30 Junior		7th
2016	IAME International Final — X30 Junior		NC
2017	Championnat de France — Junior	Karting Club Dionysien	6th
2017	Coupe de France — Junior		18th
2017	CIK-FIA European Championship — OKJ	De Gerus, Thierry	41st
2017	IAME Finale Nationale — X30 Junior		2nd
2017	CIK-FIA World Championship — OKJ	De Gerus, Thierry	88th
2017	IAME International Final — X30 Junior		29th

== Racing record ==
=== Racing career summary ===
Season	Series	Team	Races	Wins	Poles	F/Laps	Podiums	Points	Position
2018	French F4 Championship	FFSA Academy	21	0	0	0	3	88	9th
2018	French F4 Junior Championship	FFSA Academy	21	4	?	?	16	299	**2nd**
2019	French F4 Championship	FFSA Academy	21	4	2	3	11	233.5	**2nd**
2019	FIA Motorsport Games Formula 4 Cup	Team France	1	0	0	0	0	N/A	5th
2020	Formula Renault Eurocup	Arden Motorsport	20	0	0	0	0	8	17th
2021	FIA Formula 3 Championship	Charouz Racing System	12	0	0	1	0	0	28th
2021	Euroformula Open Championship	Team Motopark	6	0	0	0	0	30	16th
2022	European Le Mans Series - LMP2	Duqueine Team	3	0	0	0	0	8	18th
2022	24 Hours of Le Mans - LMP2	Duqueine Team	1	0	0	0	0	N/A	25th
2023	European Le Mans Series - LMP2	Cool Racing	6	0	1	0	1	69	6th
2023	24 Hours of Le Mans - LMP2	Cool Racing	1	0	0	0	0	N/A	DNF
2023	FIA World Endurance Championship - LMP2	Alpine Elf Team	Reserve driver						
2024	European Le Mans Series - LMP2	IDEC Sport	6	0	1	0	1	50	6th
2024	24 Hours of Le Mans - LMP2	IDEC Sport	1	0	0	0	1	N/A	**3rd**
2024	Mitjet International	MV2S	3	0	0	0	0	0	NC†
2025	European Le Mans Series - LMP2	Duqueine Team	6	0	1	0	0	10	15th
2025	24 Hours of Le Mans - LMP2	Iron Lynx – Proton	1	0	0	0	0	N/A	4th
2026	European Le Mans Series - LMP2	Inter Europol Competition	6	0	1	1	2	55	6th
2026	24 Hours of Le Mans - LMP2	Inter Europol Competition	1	0	0	0	1	N/A	**2nd**

^{*} Season still in progress.

=== Complete French F4 Championship results ===
(key) (Races in bold indicate pole position) (Races in italics indicate fastest lap)

Year	1	2	3	4	5	6	7	8	9	10	11	12	13	14	15	16	17	18	19	20	21	Pos	Points
2018	NOG; 1; 13	NOG; 2; 11	NOG; 3; 9	PAU; 1; 10	PAU; 2; 2	PAU; 3; 8	SPA; 1; 11	SPA; 2 Ret	SPA; 3; 12	DIJ; 1; 13	DIJ; 2; 12	DIJ; 3; 15	MAG; 1; 8	MAG; 2; 2	MAG; 3; 5	JER; 1; 5	JER; 2; 10	JER; 3; 4	LEC; 1; 7	LEC; 2; 5	LEC; 3; 7	9th	88
2019	NOG; 1; 3	NOG; 2; 2	NOG; 3; 2	PAU; 1; 1	PAU; 2; 7	PAU; 3; 2	SPA; 1; 13	SPA; 2; 13	SPA; 3; 1	LÉD; 1; 2	LÉD; 2; 5	LÉD; 3; 5	HUN; 1; 3	HUN; 2; 6	HUN; 3; 2	**MAG**; **1**; 1	MAG; 2; 17	**MAG**; **3**; 1	LEC; 1 Ret	LEC; 2; 11	LEC; 3; 13	2nd	233.5

=== Complete FIA Motorsport Games results ===
Year	Entrant	Cup	Qualifying	Quali Race	Main race
2019	Team France	**Formula 4**	9th	10th	5th

=== Complete Formula Renault Eurocup results ===
(key) (Races in bold indicate pole position) (Races in italics indicate fastest lap)

Year	Team	1	2	3	4	5	6	7	8	9	10	11	12	13	14	15	16	17	18	19	20	Pos	Points
2020	Arden Motorsport	MNZ; 1; 14	MNZ; 2; 13	IMO; 1; 15	IMO; 2; 15	NÜR; 1; 15	NÜR; 2 Ret	MAG; 1; 12	MAG; 2 Ret	ZAN; 1; 15	ZAN; 2; 14	CAT; 1; 17	CAT; 2; 11	SPA; 1; 14	SPA; 2; 15	IMO; 1; 7	IMO; 2; 12	HOC; 1; 15	HOC; 2; 10	LEC; 1; 12	LEC; 2 Ret	17th	8

=== Complete FIA Formula 3 Championship results ===
(key) (Races in bold indicate pole position; races in italics indicate points for the fastest lap of top ten finishers)

Year	Entrant	1	2	3	4	5	6	7	8	9	10	11	12	13	14	15	16	17	18	19	20	21	DC	Points
2021	Charouz Racing System	CAT; 1; 20	CAT; 2; 13	CAT; 3; 23	LEC; 1; 19	LEC; 2; 25	LEC; 3; 21	RBR; 1; 20	RBR; 2; 23	RBR; 3; 17	HUN; 1; 24	HUN; 2; 18	HUN; 3; 20	SPA; 1	SPA; 2	SPA; 3	ZAN; 1	ZAN; 2	ZAN; 3	SOC; 1	SOC; 2	SOC; 3	28th	0

=== Complete European Le Mans Series results ===
(key) (Races in bold indicate pole position; results in italics indicate fastest lap)

Year	Entrant	Class	Chassis	Engine	1	2	3	4	5	6	Rank	Points
2022	Duqueine Team	LMP2	Oreca 07	Gibson GK428 4.2 L V8	LEC; 12	IMO; 6	MNZ; Ret	CAT	SPA	ALG	18th	8
2023	Cool Racing	LMP2	Oreca 07	Gibson GK428 4.2 L V8	**CAT**; 4	**LEC**; 4	ARA; 5	SPA; 3	ALG; 4	POR; 7	6th	69
2024	IDEC Sport	LMP2	Oreca 07	Gibson GK428 4.2 L V8	CAT; 4	**LEC**; 4	IMO; 4	SPA; 3	MUG; Ret	ALG; 13	6th	50
2025	Duqueine Team	LMP2	Oreca 07	Gibson GK428 4.2 L V8	**CAT**; Ret	LEC; 7	IMO; 9	SPA; 10	SIL; 11	ALG; Ret	15th	10
2026	Inter Europol Competition	LMP2	Oreca 07	Gibson GK428 4.2 L V8	**CAT**; 2	LEC; 2	IMO; 7	SPA; 11	SIL; 6	ALG; 8	6th	55

^{*} Season still in progress.

=== 24 Hours of Le Mans results ===
Year	Team	Co-Drivers	Car	Class	Laps	Pos.	Class Pos.
2022	(France) Duqueine Team	(United Kingdom) Richard Bradley (Mexico) Memo Rojas	Oreca 07-Gibson	LMP2	326	52nd	25th
2023	(Switzerland) Cool Racing	Vladislav Lomko (France) Simon Pagenaud	Oreca 07-Gibson	LMP2	158	DNF	DNF
2024	(France) IDEC Sport	(France) Paul Lafargue (Netherlands) Job van Uitert	Oreca 07-Gibson	LMP2	297	17th	**3rd**
2025	(Germany) Iron Lynx – Proton	(France) Macéo Capietto (Germany) Jonas Ried	Oreca 07-Gibson	LMP2	365	21st	4th
2026	(Poland) Inter Europol Competition	(United States) Bijoy Garg (Switzerland) Nico Müller	Oreca 07-Gibson	LMP2	360	16th	**2nd**
