= BMW M3 DTM (E92) =

German touring racing automobile

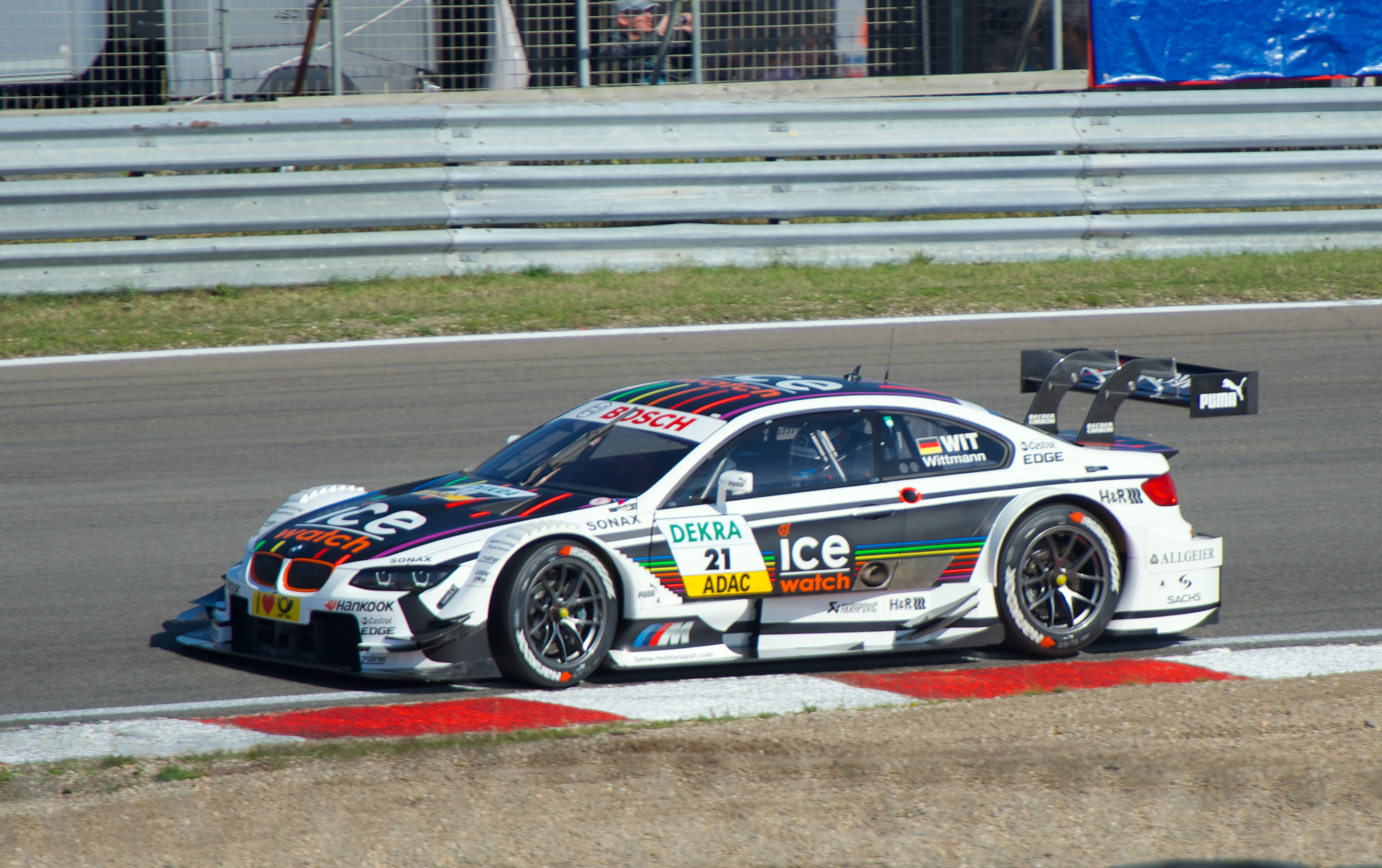
- Marco Wittmann drove his BMW M3 DTM car in 2013
- Category: Deutsche Tourenwagen Masters (Touring Cars)
- Constructor: (Germany) BMW
- Designer: Dominic Harlow
- Predecessor: BMW M3 Sport Evolution
- Successor: BMW M4 DTM

Technical specifications
- Chassis: Carbon-fibre monocoque
- Suspension (front): Pushrod with double wishbones coupled with Sachs dampers
- Suspension (rear): As front
- Length: 4,775 mm (188 in)
- Width: 1,950 mm (77 in)
- Height: 1,200 mm (47 in)
- Wheelbase: 2,750 mm (108 in)
- Engine: BMW P66 4.0 L (244 cu in) V8 90° naturally aspirated, front engined, longitudinally mounted
- Transmission: Hewland 6-speed sequential semi-automatic paddle shift
- Battery: Braille B128L Micro-Lite lithium racing battery 12 volts
- Power: 480 hp (358 kW) @ 7500 rpm, 500 N⋅m (370 ft⋅lbf) torque
- Weight: 1,100 kg (2,425 lb) (2012), 1,110 kg (2,447 lb) (2013) including driver
- Fuel: Aral Ultimate 102 RON
- Lubricants: Castrol EDGE
- Brakes: AP Racing carbon brake discs with 6-piston calipers and pads
- Tyres: Hankook Ventus; BBS wheels

Competition history
- Notable entrants: (Belgium) Team RBM (Germany) Team Schnitzer (Netherlands) Team MTEK (Germany) Team RMG
- Notable drivers: (Brazil) Augusto Farfus (United States) Joey Hand (Canada) Bruno Spengler (Germany) Martin Tomczyk (Germany) Timo Glock (Germany) Dirk Werner (Germany) Marco Wittmann (United Kingdom) Andy Priaulx
- Debut: 2012 Hockenheimring 1 Deutsche Tourenwagen Masters round
Races	Wins	Poles	F/Laps
22 (including non-championship race at Olympiastadion Munich)	10	9	7
- Constructors' Championships: 2 (2012, 2013)
- Drivers' Championships: 1 (2012)

The BMW M3 DTM is a DTM touring car constructed by the German car manufacturer BMW. It was developed in 2010 and has been raced in DTM seasons since their return to the sport after 20 years absence in 2012 until the end of 2013 season before it was succeeded by BMW M4 DTM. It was designed by BMW chief engineer Dominic Harlow. The M3 DTM was based on E92 production car.

== History ==
BMW began development, design and construction of the BMW M3 DTM in October 2010 alongside the announcement of BMW return to DTM for 2012 season. The first chassis was assembled in mid-2011, with the first vehicle completed in late 2011.

== Engine ==
The BMW P66 engine in the BMW M3 DTM generates approx. 480 bhp with the air restrictor specified in the technical regulations.

== Debut ==
With the homologation of the M3 DTM completed on March 1, 2012, the car's race debut was at the 2012 Hockenheimring DTM round on April 29, 2012.

== Achievements ==
As of 2017, BMW M3 DTM scored ten victories, nine poles, seven fastest laps, two constructor title and one driver titles (courtesy of Bruno Spengler in 2012).
