= 2025 24 Hours of Le Mans =

93rd 24 Hours of Le Mans endurance race

Previous: 2024	Next: 2026
Index: Races | Winners

(France) 2025 24 Hours of Le Mans
Event information
- Round 4 of 8 in the 2025 FIA World Endurance Championship
- Date: 14–15 June 2025
- Location: Le Mans, France
- Venue: Circuit de la Sarthe
- Duration: 24 hours
- Weather: Dry. Air temperature: 15.6–24.4 °C (60.1–75.9 °F). Track temperature: 21.2–33.6 °C (70.2–92.5 °F)

Results
- Laps completed: 387
- Distance (km): 5,272.54
- Distance (miles): 3,276.20
- Hypercar

Pole position
- Time: 3:23.166
- Team: (United States) Cadillac Hertz Team Jota
- Drivers: (United Kingdom) Alex Lynn

Winners
- Team: (Italy) AF Corse
- Drivers: (United Kingdom) Phil Hanson (Poland) Robert Kubica (China) Yifei Ye
- LMP2

Winners
- Team: (Poland) Inter Europol Competition
- Drivers: (France) Tom Dillmann (Poland) Jakub Śmiechowski (United Kingdom) Nick Yelloly
- LMP2 Pro-Am

Winners
- Team: (United States) AO by TF
- Drivers: (United States) Dane Cameron (Switzerland) Louis Delétraz (United States) P. J. Hyett
- LMGT3

Winners
- Team: (Germany) Manthey 1st Phorm
- Drivers: (United States) Ryan Hardwick (Austria) Richard Lietz (Italy) Riccardo Pera

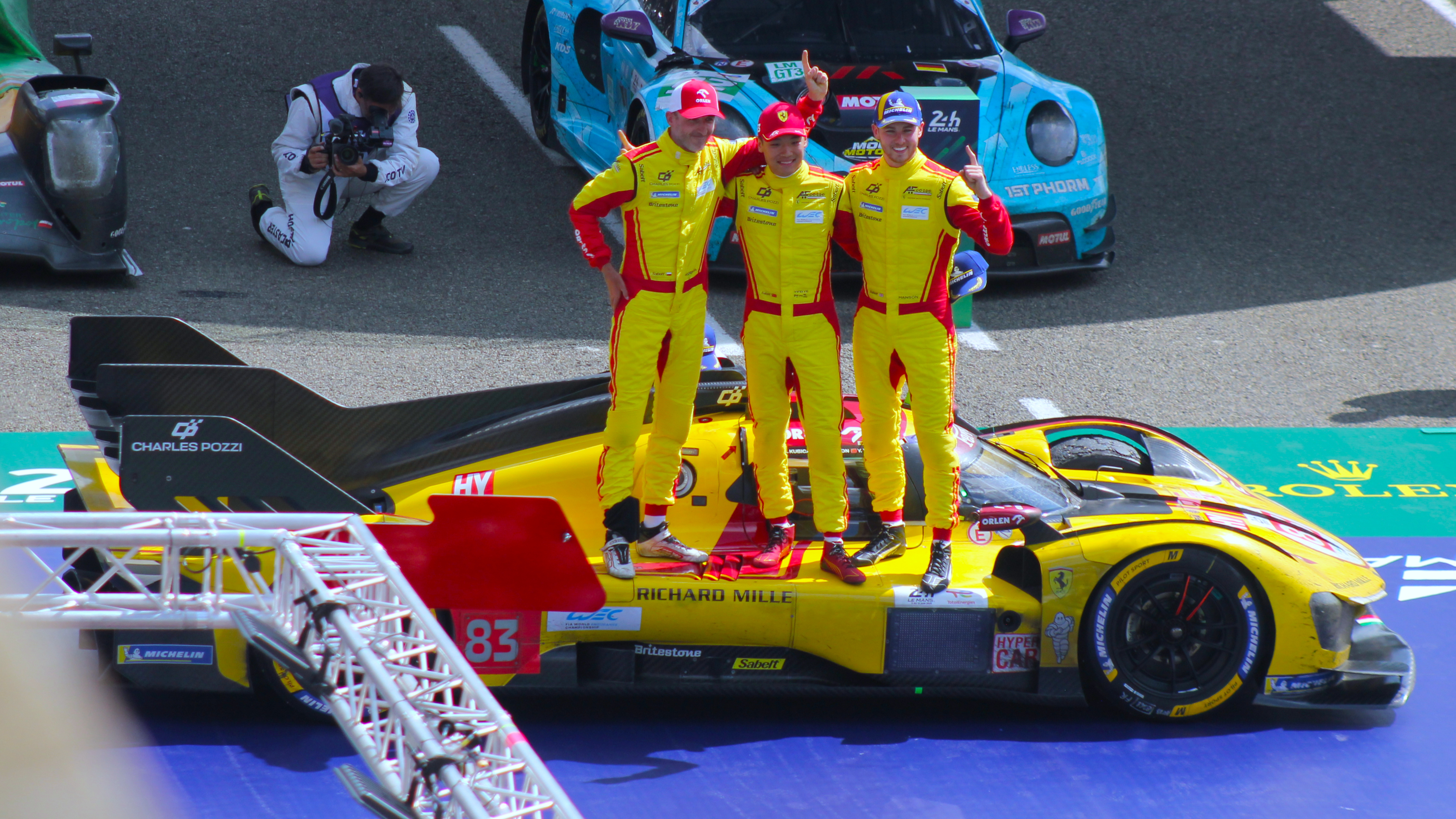
The race-winning No. 83 Ferrari 499P

The 93rd 24 Hours of Le Mans (French: 93^{e} 24 Heures du Mans) was an automobile endurance event on 14–15 June 2025 at the Circuit de la Sarthe in Le Mans, France. It was the 93rd running of the 24-hour race organised by the Automobile Club de l'Ouest, and the fourth round in the 2025 FIA World Endurance Championship. British marque Aston Martin ran two modified Valkyries in the Le Mans Hypercar class, marking a return to the top class for the first time since 2011.

After achieving the fastest lap in the Hyperpole qualifying session, the No. 12 Cadillac V-Series.R run by Hertz Team Jota and driven by Will Stevens, Alex Lynn, and Norman Nato began from pole, the first American car to do so since 1967. The race was won by the privately entered No. 83 Ferrari 499P of AF Corse, driven by Robert Kubica, Yifei Ye, and Phil Hanson, the third consecutive victory for Ferrari at the 24 Hours of Le Mans. The LMP2 class was won by the No. 43 Inter Europol Competition Oreca 07 of Nick Yelloly, Jakub Śmiechowski and Tom Dillmann, the team's second victory in three years. Another consecutive victory went to the LMGT3 winners: Manthey's No. 92 Porsche 911 GT3, driven by Richard Lietz, with the addition of Ryan Hardwick and Riccardo Pera this year.

== Background ==
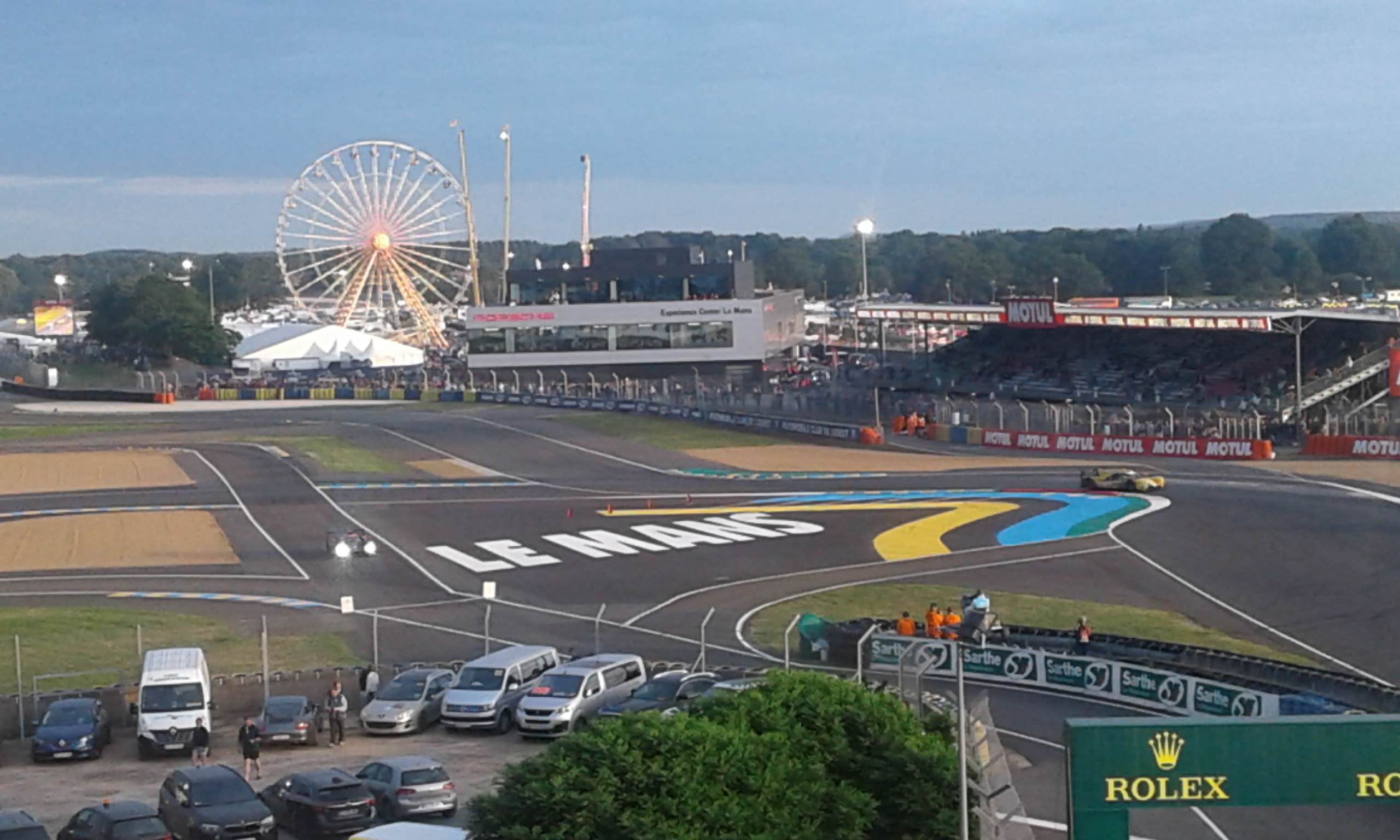
The Circuit de la Sarthe

The 2025 edition of the 24 Hours of Le Mans, held at the Circuit de la Sarthe near Le Mans, France, was the 93rd running of the event since its inception in 1923. The fourth round of the FIA World Endurance Championship (FIA WEC), the race weekend ran from 11 to 15 June, with the race itself taking place on the 14th and 15th.

Prior to the event, Alessandro Pier Guidi, Antonio Giovinazzi, and James Calado, the drivers of the No. 51 Ferrari 499P, were leading the Hypercar Driver's Championship with 75 points, 18 ahead of Antonio Fuoco, Miguel Molina, and Nicklas Nielsen, the drivers of the Ferrari No. 50 sister car. Phil Hanson, Robert Kubica, and Yifei Ye of the privateer No. 83 Ferrari, the eventual winners of the 2025 race, were third in the standings with 39 points. Ferrari had won all three previous races in the championship — the Qatar 1812 km, the 6 Hours of Imola, and the 6 Hours of Spa-Francorchamps — and led second place Toyota by 136 points to 71 in the Hypercar Manufacturers' Championship.

In the LMGT3 Driver's Championship, the No. 33 Chevrolet Corvette Z06 GT3.R, run by TF Sport and driven by Ben Keating, Daniel Juncadella, and Jonny Edgar, had scored 44 points, four points ahead of Vista AF Corse's No. 21 Ferrari 296, driven by Alessio Rovera, François Hériau, and Simon Mann. Akkodis ASP's No. 78 Lexus RC F was third with 38 points.

== Entries ==
62 cars in total were given entries to the race, with six more listed as reserve. This list included the 36 full season WEC competitors — 18 in both Hypercar and LMGT3. Additional invitations included three in Hypercar, 17 in LMP2 (nine Pro and eight Pro-Am lineups), and six in LMGT3.

British marque Aston Martin made its return to the top class for the first time since 2011, entering two Valkyrie AMR-LMHs as part of a full season campaign in the WEC. Mercedes-Benz were also competing in the race for the first time since 1999, running three Mercedes-AMG GT3 Evos in the LMGT3 category.

=== Automatic entries ===
In addition to all full-season WEC entries, automatic invites were given to all championship winners in the European Le Mans Series (ELMS), LMP2 and LMGT3 in the Asian Le Mans Series (ALMS) and Bronze Cup in GT World Challenge Europe's (GTWCE) combined Endurance and Sprint championship. Second-place finishers in LMP2 in the ELMS also earned an invite. Three IMSA teams were also granted invites, one in Hypercar at the discretion of IMSA, and one each for the Jim Trueman and Bob Akin awards, given to the highest placed Bronze-rated drivers in IMSA's LMP2 and GT3 classes.

Automatic entries for the 2025 24 Hours of Le Mans
Reason invited	Hypercar	LMP2	LMGT3
1st in the European Le Mans Series (LMP2 and LMGT3)		(United States) AO by TF	(Italy) Iron Lynx
2nd in the European Le Mans Series (LMP2)		(Poland) Inter Europol Competition	
1st in the European Le Mans Series (LMP2 Pro-Am)		(Italy) AF Corse	
1st in the European Le Mans Series (LMP3)		(United Kingdom) RLR MSport	
IMSA SportsCar Championship at-large entries	(Germany) Porsche Penske Motorsport	(United States) Nick Boulle	(Canada) Orey Fidani
1st in the Asian Le Mans Series (LMP2 and GT)		(Portugal) Algarve Pro Racing	(Germany) Manthey Racing
1st in the GT World Challenge Europe (Bronze Cup)			(United Kingdom) Sky – Tempesta Racing

=== Entry list ===
Entries in the LMP2 Pro-Am Cup, set aside for teams with a Bronze-rated driver in their line-up, are denoted with icons.

Icon	Series
WEC	FIA World Endurance Championship
ELMS	European Le Mans Series
ALMS	Asian Le Mans Series
IMSA	IMSA SportsCar Championship
GTWC	GT World Challenge Europe
24LM	24 Hours of Le Mans only
Icon	MISC
P2	LMP2
PA	LMP2 Pro-Am

No.	Entrant	Car	Tyre	Series	MISC	Driver 1	Driver 2	Driver 3
Hypercar (21 entries)
007	(United States) Aston Martin THOR Team	Aston Martin Valkyrie	M	WEC		(United Kingdom) Tom Gamble	(United Kingdom) Ross Gunn	(United Kingdom) Harry Tincknell
009	(United States) Aston Martin THOR Team	Aston Martin Valkyrie	M	WEC		(Canada) Roman De Angelis	(Spain) Alex Riberas	(Denmark) Marco Sørensen
4	(Germany) Porsche Penske Motorsport	Porsche 963	M	IMSA	Hybrid	(Brazil) Felipe Nasr	(United Kingdom) Nick Tandy	(Germany) Pascal Wehrlein
5	(Germany) Porsche Penske Motorsport	Porsche 963	M	WEC	Hybrid	(France) Julien Andlauer	(Denmark) Michael Christensen	(France) Mathieu Jaminet
6	(Germany) Porsche Penske Motorsport	Porsche 963	M	WEC	Hybrid	(Australia) Matt Campbell	(France) Kévin Estre	(Belgium) Laurens Vanthoor
7	(Japan) Toyota Gazoo Racing	Toyota GR010 Hybrid	M	WEC	Hybrid	(United Kingdom) Mike Conway	(Japan) Kamui Kobayashi	(Netherlands) Nyck de Vries
8	(Japan) Toyota Gazoo Racing	Toyota GR010 Hybrid	M	WEC	Hybrid	(Switzerland) Sébastien Buemi	(New Zealand) Brendon Hartley	(Japan) Ryō Hirakawa
12	(United States) Cadillac Hertz Team Jota	Cadillac V-Series.R	M	WEC	Hybrid	(United Kingdom) Alex Lynn	(France) Norman Nato	(United Kingdom) Will Stevens
15	(Germany) BMW M Team WRT	BMW M Hybrid V8	M	WEC	Hybrid	(Denmark) Kevin Magnussen	(Switzerland) Raffaele Marciello	(Belgium) Dries Vanthoor
20	(Germany) BMW M Team WRT	BMW M Hybrid V8	M	WEC	Hybrid	(Netherlands) Robin Frijns	(Germany) René Rast	(South Africa) Sheldon van der Linde
35	(France) Alpine Endurance Team	Alpine A424	M	WEC	Hybrid	(France) Paul-Loup Chatin	(Austria) Ferdinand Habsburg	(France) Charles Milesi
36	(France) Alpine Endurance Team	Alpine A424	M	WEC	Hybrid	(France) Jules Gounon	(France) Frédéric Makowiecki	(Germany) Mick Schumacher
38	(United States) Cadillac Hertz Team Jota	Cadillac V-Series.R	M	WEC	Hybrid	(New Zealand) Earl Bamber	(France) Sébastien Bourdais	(United Kingdom) Jenson Button
50	(Italy) Ferrari AF Corse	Ferrari 499P	M	WEC	Hybrid	(Italy) Antonio Fuoco	(Spain) Miguel Molina	(Denmark) Nicklas Nielsen
51	(Italy) Ferrari AF Corse	Ferrari 499P	M	WEC	Hybrid	(United Kingdom) James Calado	(Italy) Antonio Giovinazzi	(Italy) Alessandro Pier Guidi
83	(Italy) AF Corse	Ferrari 499P	M	WEC	Hybrid	(United Kingdom) Phil Hanson	(Poland) Robert Kubica	(China) Yifei Ye
93	(France) Peugeot TotalEnergies	Peugeot 9X8	M	WEC	Hybrid	(United Kingdom) Paul di Resta	(Denmark) Mikkel Jensen	(France) Jean-Éric Vergne
94	(France) Peugeot TotalEnergies	Peugeot 9X8	M	WEC	Hybrid	(France) Loïc Duval	(Denmark) Malthe Jakobsen	(Belgium) Stoffel Vandoorne
99	(Germany) Proton Competition	Porsche 963	M	WEC	Hybrid	(Switzerland) Neel Jani	(Chile) Nico Pino	(Argentina) Nicolás Varrone
101	(United States) Cadillac WTR	Cadillac V-Series.R	M	IMSA	Hybrid	(Portugal) Filipe Albuquerque	(United States) Jordan Taylor	(United States) Ricky Taylor
311	(United States) Cadillac Whelen	Cadillac V-Series.R	M	IMSA	Hybrid	(United Kingdom) Jack Aitken	(Brazil) Felipe Drugovich	(Denmark) Frederik Vesti
LMP2 (17 entries)
9	(Germany) Iron Lynx – Proton	Oreca 07-Gibson	G	ELMS	P2	(France) Macéo Capietto	(France) Reshad de Gerus	(Germany) Jonas Ried
11	(Germany) Proton Competition	Oreca 07-Gibson	G	ALMS	PA	(Austria) René Binder	(Italy) Giorgio Roda	(Netherlands) Bent Viscaal
16	(United Kingdom) RLR MSport	Oreca 07-Gibson	G	24LM	PA	(Republic of Ireland) Ryan Cullen	(Denmark) Michael Jensen	(France) Patrick Pilet
18	(France) IDEC Sport	Oreca 07-Gibson	G	ELMS	P2	(United Kingdom) Jamie Chadwick	(France) Mathys Jaubert	(Germany) André Lotterer
22	(United Kingdom) United Autosports	Oreca 07-Gibson	G	ELMS	P2	(Brazil) Pietro Fittipaldi	(Denmark) David Heinemeier Hansson	(Netherlands) Renger van der Zande
23	(United Kingdom) United Autosports	Oreca 07-Gibson	G	ELMS	PA	(United Kingdom) Ben Hanley	(United Kingdom) Oliver Jarvis	(Brazil) Daniel Schneider
24	(United Kingdom) Nielsen Racing	Oreca 07-Gibson	G	ELMS	PA	(Turkey) Cem Bölükbaşı	(United States) Colin Braun	(United States) Naveen Rao
25	(Portugal) Algarve Pro Racing	Oreca 07-Gibson	G	ELMS	P2	(Spain) Lorenzo Fluxá	(Liechtenstein) Matthias Kaiser	(France) Théo Pourchaire
28	(France) IDEC Sport	Oreca 07-Gibson	G	ELMS	P2	(Mexico) Sebastián Álvarez	(France) Paul Lafargue	(Netherlands) Job van Uitert
29	(France) TDS Racing	Oreca 07-Gibson	G	ELMS	PA	(Switzerland) Mathias Beche	(France) Clément Novalak	(United States) Rodrigo Sales
34	(Poland) Inter Europol Competition	Oreca 07-Gibson	G	IMSA	PA	(United States) Nick Boulle	(Italy) Luca Ghiotto	(France) Jean-Baptiste Simmenauer
37	(Lithuania) CLX – Pure Rxcing	Oreca 07-Gibson	G	ELMS	P2	(United Kingdom) Tom Blomqvist	(Saint Kitts and Nevis) Alex Malykhin (Note: Malykhin is Belarusian, but he competes under a Kittitian licence as Russian national emblems were banned by the FIA following the Russian invasion of Ukraine.)	(France) Tristan Vautier
43	(Poland) Inter Europol Competition	Oreca 07-Gibson	G	ELMS	P2	(France) Tom Dillmann	(Poland) Jakub Śmiechowski	(United Kingdom) Nick Yelloly
45	(Portugal) Algarve Pro Racing	Oreca 07-Gibson	G	IMSA	PA	(Netherlands) Nicky Catsburg	(United States) George Kurtz	(United Kingdom) Alex Quinn
48	(France) VDS Panis Racing	Oreca 07-Gibson	G	ELMS	P2	(United Kingdom) Oliver Gray	(France) Esteban Masson	(France) Franck Perera
183	(Italy) AF Corse	Oreca 07-Gibson	G	ELMS	PA	(Portugal) António Félix da Costa	(France) François Perrodo	(France) Matthieu Vaxivière
199	(United States) AO by TF	Oreca 07-Gibson	G	ELMS	PA	(United States) Dane Cameron	(Switzerland) Louis Delétraz	(United States) P. J. Hyett
LMGT3 (24 entries)
10	(France) Racing Spirit of Léman	Aston Martin Vantage AMR GT3 Evo	G	WEC		(Brazil) Eduardo Barrichello	(United States) Derek DeBoer	(France) Valentin Hasse-Clot
13	(Canada) AWA Racing	Chevrolet Corvette Z06 GT3.R	G	IMSA		(United Kingdom) Matt Bell	(Canada) Orey Fidani	(Germany) Lars Kern
21	(Italy) Vista AF Corse	Ferrari 296 GT3	G	WEC		(France) François Hériau	(United States) Simon Mann	(Italy) Alessio Rovera
27	(United States) Heart of Racing Team	Aston Martin Vantage AMR GT3 Evo	G	WEC		(Italy) Mattia Drudi	(United Kingdom) Ian James	(Canada) Zacharie Robichon
31	(Belgium) The Bend Team WRT	BMW M4 GT3 Evo	G	WEC		Timur Boguslavskiy (Note: Boguslavskiy and Lomko are Russian, but they compete as neutral competitors as Russian national emblems were banned by the FIA following the Russian invasion of Ukraine.)	(Brazil) Augusto Farfus	(Australia) Yasser Shahin
33	(United Kingdom) TF Sport	Chevrolet Corvette Z06 GT3.R	G	WEC		(United Kingdom) Jonny Edgar	(Spain) Daniel Juncadella	(United States) Ben Keating
46	(Belgium) Team WRT	BMW M4 GT3 Evo	G	WEC		(Oman) Ahmad Al Harthy	(Italy) Valentino Rossi	(South Africa) Kelvin van der Linde
54	(Italy) Vista AF Corse	Ferrari 296 GT3	G	WEC		(Italy) Francesco Castellacci	(Switzerland) Thomas Flohr	(Italy) Davide Rigon
57	(Switzerland) Kessel Racing	Ferrari 296 GT3	G	ELMS		(Japan) Takeshi Kimura	(Brazil) Daniel Serra	(United Kingdom) Casper Stevenson
59	(United Kingdom) United Autosports	McLaren 720S GT3 Evo	G	WEC		(France) Sébastien Baud	(United Kingdom) James Cottingham	(Switzerland) Grégoire Saucy
60	(Italy) Iron Lynx	Mercedes-AMG GT3 Evo	G	WEC		(United Kingdom) Andrew Gilbert	(United Kingdom) Lorcan Hanafin	(Spain) Fran Rueda
61	(Italy) Iron Lynx	Mercedes-AMG GT3 Evo	G	WEC		(Australia) Martin Berry	(Netherlands) Lin Hodenius	(Belgium) Maxime Martin
63	(Italy) Iron Lynx	Mercedes-AMG GT3 Evo	G	ELMS		(Australia) Brenton Grove	(Australia) Stephen Grove	(Germany) Luca Stolz
77	(Germany) Proton Competition	Ford Mustang GT3	G	WEC		(United Kingdom) Ben Barker	(Portugal) Bernardo Sousa	(United Kingdom) Ben Tuck
78	(France) Akkodis ASP Team	Lexus RC F GT3	G	WEC		(Germany) Finn Gehrsitz	(United Kingdom) Jack Hawksworth	(France) Arnold Robin
81	(United Kingdom) TF Sport	Chevrolet Corvette Z06 GT3.R	G	WEC		(Angola) Rui Andrade	(Republic of Ireland) Charlie Eastwood	(Belgium) Tom Van Rompuy
85	(Italy) Iron Dames	Porsche 911 GT3 R (992)	G	WEC		(Belgium) Sarah Bovy	(Switzerland) Rahel Frey	(France) Célia Martin
87	(France) Akkodis ASP Team	Lexus RC F GT3	G	WEC		(Argentina) José María López	(Austria) Clemens Schmid	(Romania) Petru Umbrărescu
88	(Germany) Proton Competition	Ford Mustang GT3	G	WEC		(Italy) Stefano Gattuso	(Italy) Giammarco Levorato	(Norway) Dennis Olsen
90	(Germany) Manthey	Porsche 911 GT3 R (992)	G	ALMS		(Hong Kong) Antares Au	(Austria) Klaus Bachler	(Netherlands) Loek Hartog
92	(Germany) Manthey 1st Phorm	Porsche 911 GT3 R (992)	G	WEC		(United States) Ryan Hardwick	(Austria) Richard Lietz	(Italy) Riccardo Pera
95	(United Kingdom) United Autosports	McLaren 720S GT3 Evo	G	WEC		(Indonesia) Sean Gelael	(United Kingdom) Darren Leung	(Japan) Marino Sato
150	(Italy) Richard Mille AF Corse	Ferrari 296 GT3	G	ELMS		(Italy) Riccardo Agostini	(Brazil) Custodio Toledo	(France) Lilou Wadoux
193	(United Kingdom) Ziggo Sport – Tempesta	Ferrari 296 GT3	G	GTWC		(Italy) Eddie Cheever III	(United Kingdom) Chris Froggatt	(Hong Kong) Jonathan Hui

=== Reserve entries ===
In addition to the sixty-two entries given invitations for the race, six entries were put on a reserve list to potentially replace any invitations that were not accepted or withdrawn. Reserve entries are ordered with the first reserve replacing the first withdrawal from the race, regardless of the class of either entry.

Reserve	Class	No.	Entrant	Car	Tyre	Series	MISC	Driver 1	Driver 2	Driver 3
1st	Hypercar	44	(Germany) Proton Competition	Porsche 963	M	IMSA	Hybrid	(France) Tristan Vautier	TBA	TBA
2nd	LMGT3	86	(United Kingdom) GR Racing	Ferrari 296 GT3	G	ELMS		(United Kingdom) Michael Wainwright	TBA	TBA
3rd	LMP2	3	(Luxembourg) DKR Engineering	Oreca 07-Gibson	G	ELMS	PA	(Germany) Alexander Mattschull	TBA	TBA
4th	LMP2	30	(France) Duqueine Team	Oreca 07-Gibson	G	ELMS	PA	(United States) Mark Patterson	TBA	TBA
5th	LMGT3	66	(United Kingdom) JMW Motorsport	Ferrari 296 GT3	G	ELMS		(United States) Jason Hart	(United States) Scott Noble	TBA
6th	LMP2	26	(United Kingdom) Vector Sport	Oreca 07-Gibson	G	ELMS	P2	(Republic of Ireland) Ryan Cullen	(Brazil) Pietro Fittipaldi	Vladislav Lomko

== Testing ==
Prior to the race, all entrants were required to participate in a test day, which took place on 8 June.

The first session of the test day ran from 10:00 to 13:00 CEST (UTC+02:00). In the Hypercar class, the No. 83 Ferrari 499P driven by Robert Kubica set the fastest lap time of 3:27.010, followed by the No. 8 Toyota GR010 of Brendon Hartley with a time of 3:28.000. The No. 38 JOTA Cadillac V-Series.R, No. 51 Ferrari 499P, and No. 331 Whelen Cadillac V-Series.R set the third, fourth, and fifth fastest times respectively. All of the Hypercar entrants took part, including the No. 007 and No. 009 Aston Martin Valkyrie AMR-LMHs for which this was their first time completing laps at Le Mans. In the LMP2 class, the fastest Pro and Pro-Am times were set by the No. 37 CLX Pure Rxcing and the No. 16 RLR Oreca 07s, with times of 3:36.853 and 3:36.593 respectively. José María López in the No. 87 Akkodis ASP Lexus RC F set the fasted time in LMGT3 with a 3:57.109; second through fifth were taken by the No. 21 Vista AF Corse Ferrari 296, No. 78 Akkodis ASP Lexus RC F, No. 57 Kessel Racing Ferrari 296, and the No. 150 Richard Mille AF Corse Ferrari 296. During the session, the No. 34 Inter Europol Oreca 07 of Luca Ghiotto crashed at the Porsche Curves, requiring the deployment of the safety car. Additionally, the No. 45 CrowdStrike Algarve Pro Racing Oreca 07 suffered an engine failure during the test; a replacement was installed and the car returned to the circuit before the end of the session.

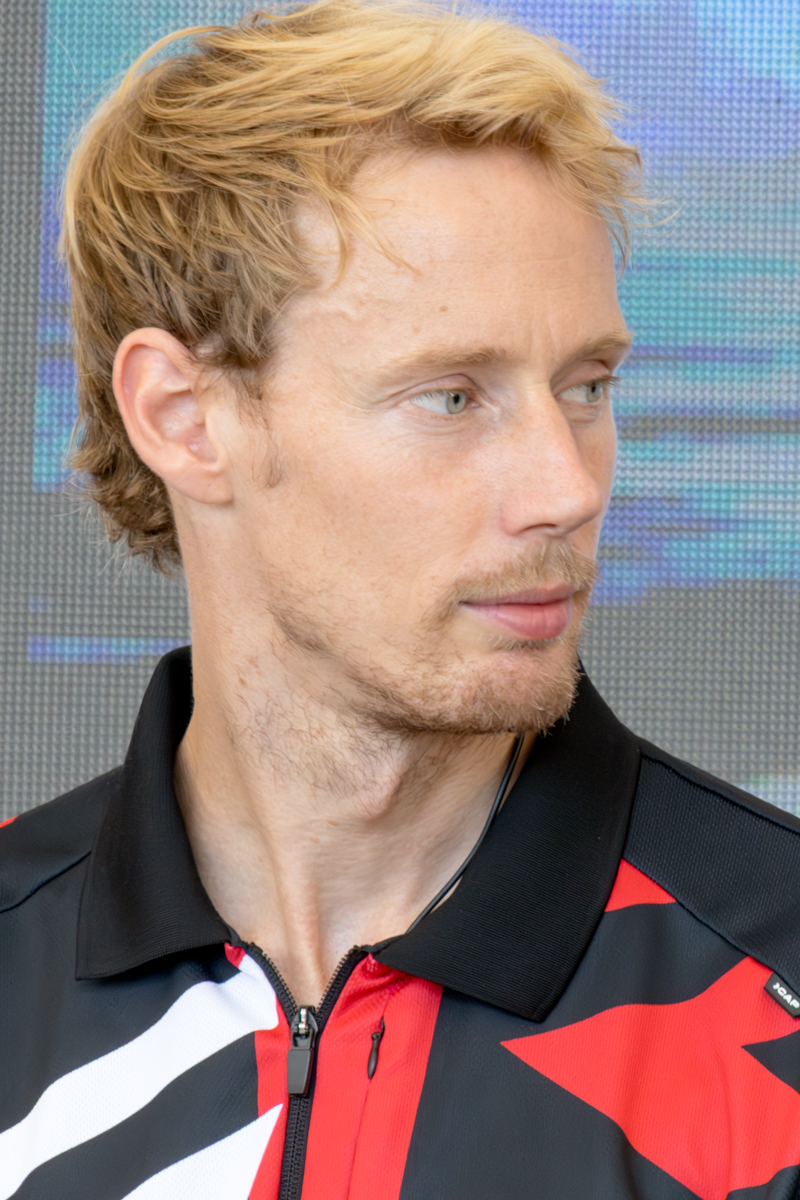
Brendon Hartley set the fastest overall time during the test day.

The second session took place from 15:30 to 18:30 CEST. The No. 8 Toyota GR010, again driven by Brendon Hartley, set the fastest time of 3:26.246, beating both the fastest time from the first test session, and the fastest time from the 2024 test day — a 3:26.9, set by Kévin Estre. Hartley's time was followed by a 3:26.777, set by James Calado in the No. 51 Ferrari 499P, and the No. 36 Alpine A424 of Mick Schumacher; the No. 6 Porsche 963 and No. 83 Ferrari 499P placed fourth and fifth. The fastest LMP2 time, a 3:35.770, was set by the Pro-class No. 22 United Autosports Oreca 07 driven by Pietro Fittipaldi, and the fastest Pro-Am time (and second-fastest LMP2 time overall) was a 3:36.225, set by the No. 29 TDS Racing Oreca 07. In LMGT3, the No. 87 Lexus RC F of José María López again set the fastest time, a 3:55.276: faster than his time in the first test session, and more than four seconds faster than the best time set by an LMGT3 car during the 2024 test day, a 3:59.883. Second and third fastest in class were the No. 21 Vista and No. 57 Kessel Ferrari 296s. During the test, running was stopped three times. These were caused by the No. 20 BMW M Hybrid V8 of Sheldon van der Linde suffering an oil leak and become beached in the gravel trap at the Porsche Curves, a crash by Giorgio Roda in the No. 11 Proton Competition Oreca 07 causing barrier damage at Indianapolis, and the No. 63 Iron Lynx Mercedes-AMG GT3 Evo of Brenton Grove entering the gravel runoff at the Porsche Curves: this final incident occurred only five minutes from the end of the session, and running was not resumed.

During the test, Michelle Gatting, the gold-rated driver of the No. 85 Iron Dames Porsche 911 GT3 R (992), was injured after her car was dropped on her foot during a driver change, fracturing it and forcing her to withdraw from the race. She was replaced by Sarah Bovy, who had competed four times at Le Mans previously but stepped back from driving in the 2025 WEC season after her driver rating was upgraded from Bronze to Silver.

== Practice ==
=== Practice 1 ===
The first practice session, three hours long, took place in the afternoon of 11 June during which conditions were warm and sunny. The fastest lap time of the session was set by Sébastien Bourdais in the No. 38 JOTA Cadillac V-Series.R, a 3:25.148, despite an early spin and later carbon fibre damage necessitating repair. Prior to Bourdais' time, set 35 minutes before the end of the session, the fastest lap was held by Antonio Fuoco in the No. 50 Ferrari 499P: his 3:25.302, set on the car's first flying lap of the session, eventually placed him second overall. Third, fourth, and fifth-fastest times in the Hypercar class were set by the No. 6 Porsche 963, the No. 8 Toyota GR010, and the No. 5 Porsche 963. In LMP2, the Pro-Am No. 16 RLR Oreca 07 led the standings with a 3:36.888 set by Patrick Pilet, followed by the Pro No. 43 Inter Europol Oreca 07, the No. 45 Algarve Pro Racing Oreca 07, the No. 48 VDS Panis Racing Oreca 07, and the No. 29 TDS Racing Oreca 07. The No. 78 Akkodis ASP Lexus RC F set the fastest time in LMGT3, a 3:57.248 driven by Jack Hawksworth, ahead of the No. 54 Vista Ferrari 296 and the No. 10 Racing Spirit of Léman Aston Martin Vantage. Running was twice interrupted by red flags: first for a crash at the Dunlop Chicane by Stephen Grove in the No. 63 Iron Lynx Mercedes-AMG GT3, and the second ten minutes later for debris on track. The damage sustained by the No. 63 required a replacement chassis, causing the team to miss qualifying and the next free practice session that evening.

Class	No.	Entrant	Driver	Time
Hypercar	38	(United States) Cadillac Hertz Team Jota	(France) Sébastien Bourdais	3:25.148
LMP2	43	(Poland) Inter Europol Competition	(United Kingdom) Nick Yelloly	3:37.125
LMP2 Pro-Am	16	(United Kingdom) RLR MSport	(France) Patrick Pilet	3:36.888
LMGT3	78	(France) Akkodis ASP Team	(United Kingdom) Jack Hawksworth	3:57.248

- Note: Only the fastest car in each class is shown.

=== Practice 2 ===
The second free practice session followed that night and lasted two hours. In Hypercar, Robert Kubica set the fastest time early in the session driving the No. 83 Ferrari 499P, a 3:25.101. After the session concluded, Kubica's time was deleted for pit lane speeding, promoting the No. 8 Toyota GR010 to first place with a 3:26.156. The next fastest time by the No. 83, a 3:26.680 set by Yifei Ye, placed the car third behind the No. 12 JOTA Cadillac V-Series.R, followed in fourth and fifth by the No. 4 Porsche 963 of Pascal Wehrlein and the No. 50 Ferrari 499P of Miguel Molina. In LMP2 the fastest time was set by Dane Cameron of the No. 199 AO by TF Oreca 07 with a 3:37.515; second and third fastest were the No.22 United Autosports and No. 37 CLX Pure Rxcing Oreca 07s, driven by Pietro Fittipaldi and Tom Blomqvist respectively. Lexus claimed the top two fastest times in LMGT3, leading with a 3:55.422 set by José María López aboard the No. 87, followed in third by the No. 91 Manthey 1st Phorm Porsche 911 driven by Richard Lietz. Two cars did not participate in the session: the No. 33 TF Sport Chevrolet Corvette Z06 GT3.R due to a gearbox leak, and the No. 63 Iron Lynx Mercedes-AMG GT3.

Class	No.	Entrant	Driver	Time
Hypercar	8	(Japan) Toyota Gazoo Racing	(Switzerland) Sébastien Buemi	3:26.156
LMP2	22	(United Kingdom) United Autosports	(Brazil) Pietro Fittipaldi	3:38.644
LMP2 Pro-Am	199	(United States) AO by TF	(United States) Dane Cameron	3:37.515
LMGT3	87	(France) Akkodis ASP Team	(Argentina) José María López	3:55.422

- Note: Only the fastest car in each class is shown.

=== Practice 3 ===
Free Practice 3 took place in warm, sunny conditions on the afternoon of 12 June, preceding the Hyperpole qualifying session the same evening. The Hypercar times were led by the No. 5 Porsche 963, with driver Mathieu Jaminet setting a 3:24.717 lap time, followed by the two JOTA Cadillacs of Earl Bamber (No. 38) and Will Stevens (No. 12), then the No. 51 and No. 83 Ferrari 499Ps, the former holding the fastest lap for most of the three-hour session. The No. 101 Wayne Taylor Racing Cadillac did not participate in most of the session in order to conduct an engine replacement. The No. 29 Pro-Am TDS Racing Oreca 07 led LMP2 standings after a 3:36.827 lap by Mathias Beche, with the Pro-Am No. 23 United Autosports Oreca 07 second; third was the fastest Pro-class LMP2 car, the No. 43 Inter Europol Oreca 07. In LMGT3 the fastest time, a 3:55.897, was set by Zacharie Robichon of the No. 27 Heart of Racing Aston Martin Vantage, followed by the No. 92 Manthey 1st Phorm Porsche 911 and No. 78 Akkodis ASP Lexus RC F in second and third. The session featured one red flag stoppage for barrier repairs after two simultaneous LMP2 car crashes: the first, the No. 183 of François Perrodo striking the tire wall at the Porsche Curves after losing control while attempting to pass traffic; the second took place at the first Mulsanne chicane, whereby the No. 37 CLX Pure Rxcing car driven by Alex Malykhin struck the tire wall while evading the spun No. 85 Iron Dames Porsche 911 of Célia Martin. Additionally, near the end of the session, the No. 28 IDEC Sport LMP2 entry lost a wheel in the Porsche Curves, forcing driver Job van Uitert to slowly bring the car back to the pit lane.

Class	No.	Entrant	Driver	Time
Hypercar	5	(Germany) Porsche Penske Motorsport	(France) Mathieu Jaminet	3:24.717
LMP2	43	(Poland) Inter Europol Competition	(France) Tom Dillmann	3:37.563
LMP2 Pro-Am	29	(France) TDS Racing	(Switzerland) Mathias Beche	3:36.827
LMGT3	27	(United States) Heart of Racing Team	(Canada) Zacharie Robichon	3:55.897

- Note: Only the fastest car in each class is shown.

=== Final practice ===
The fourth and final practice session took place at night following the Hyperpole qualifying session on 12 June. Ferrari achieved a 1–2 of fastest times in Hypercar, led by a 3:26.523 set by Robert Kubica in the No. 83 499P, followed by the No. 50 nearly a second behind. Third and fourth were occupied by the No. 311 Whelen and No. 38 JOTA Cadillacs, followed by the No. 6 Porsche 963 in fifth and the pole-sitting No. 12 JOTA Cadillac in sixth. The top LMP2 time, a 3:38.302, was set by Esteban Masson in the No. 48 VDS Panis Racing Oreca 07, after which was placed the No. 29 TDS Racing and No. 183 AF Corse Oreca 07s; the fastest LMGT3 time of 3:55.057 was set by José María López in the No. 87 Akkodis ASP Lexus RC F, followed by the No. 10 Racing Spirit of Léman Aston Martin Vantage and the No. 54 Vista Ferrari 296. During the hour-long running, the No. 15 BMW M Hybrid V8, No. 27 Heart of Racing Aston Martin Vantage, and No. 63 Iron Lynx Mercedes AMG GT3 suffered mechanical failures that caused them to retire from the session. The failure for the No. 63 occurred only one lap into Free Practice 4; having also missed the night time Free Practice 2, none of the three drivers had completed the mandatory five laps of night running prior to the race. The team was allowed to participate in the race on the condition that their fastest driver, Luca Stolz, must start the race, and that the Bronze-rated Stephen Grove, having completed no laps in darkness whatsoever, was not allowed to drive between 22:00 and 06:00 during the race itself.

Class	No.	Entrant	Driver	Time
Hypercar	83	(Italy) AF Corse	(Poland) Robert Kubica	3:26.523
LMP2	48	(France) VDS Panis Racing	(France) Esteban Masson	3:38.302
LMP2 Pro-Am	29	(France) TDS Racing	(France) Clément Novalak	3:38.930
LMGT3	87	(France) Akkodis ASP Team	(Argentina) José María López	3:55.057

- Note: Only the fastest car in each class is shown.

== Qualifying ==
Initial qualifying took place after Free Practice 1 during the evening of 11 June and comprised one session for the Hypercar class and one combined session for LMP2 and LMGT3, each 30 minutes long. The fastest 15 in the Hypercar class, and the fastest 12 in the LMP2 and LMGT3 classes, advanced to shootout "Hyperpole" sessions on 12 June to determine the final qualifying order; teams that did not advance (in both the qualifying and hyperpole sessions) had their grid position set by the initial session.

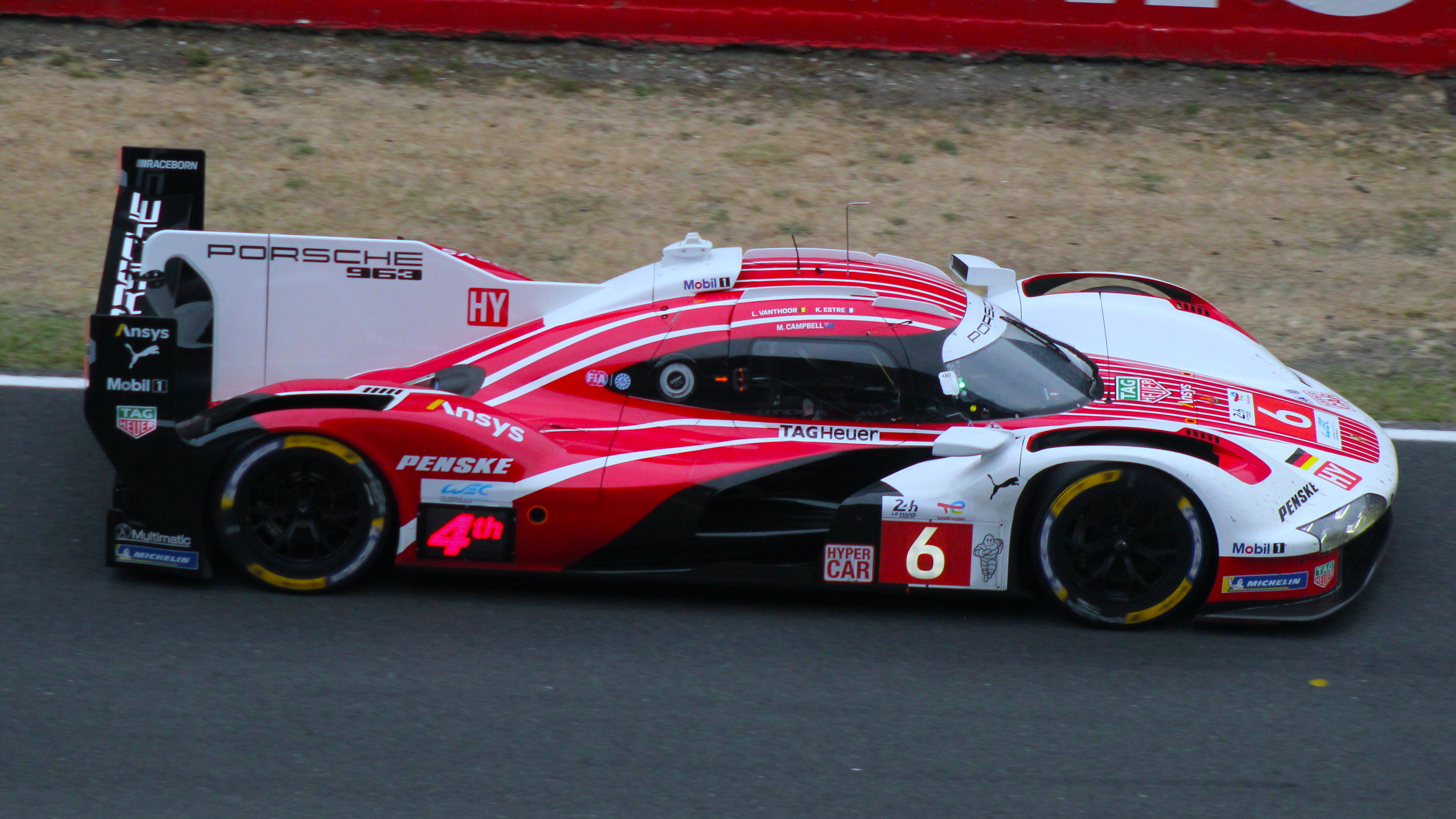
The No. 6 Penske Porsche 963 was disqualified from qualifying due to a violation of minimum weight regulations.

The first qualifying session took place in very hot conditions. In the Hypercar session, Alex Lynn set the fastest qualifying time of 3:22.847 in the No. 12 JOTA Cadillac, four-hundredths of a second ahead of the No. 15 BMW M Hybrid V8 of Dries Vanthoor. The winner of the 2023 24 Hours of Le Mans, the No. 51 Ferrari 499P, placed third. The 2024 24 Hours pole-sitting No. 6 Porsche 963, which initially qualified fourth ahead of the No. 38 Cadillac, was disqualified after the car was found to be underweight; it would start from the back of the Hypercar grid. Its disqualification allowed the No. 009 Aston Martin Valkyrie, which originally qualified in 16th, to advance into Hyperpole. Hypercars eliminated were the No. 007 Aston Martin Valkyrie, the two Peugeot 9X8s, the No. 99 Proton Competition Porsche 963, and, surprisingly, the No. 7 Toyota GR010, which driver Nyck de Vries qualified 16th, 2.215 seconds slower than the pole time and 1.074 seconds slower than the time set by the No. 8 sister car. De Vries stated that the poor result was due to a tyre lock-up under deceleration while entering a yellow flag zone behind an Alpine at the Porsche Curves.

In the joint LMP2-LMGT3 qualifying session, interrupted and shortened by two red flags, the fastest times were set by the No. 199 AO by TF Oreca 07 in LMP2, (Note: All LMP2 cars qualified as a single class, regardless of their status as Pro or Pro-Am entries.) completing a 3:35.472 lap driven by Louis Delétraz, and the No. 46 Team WRT BMW M4 of Ahmad Al Harthy which set a 3:56.875. Eliminated were both Proton Competition entries (No. 11 and No. 9), the No. 24 Nielsen Racing entry, the No. 34 Inter Europol entry, and the Genesis-backed No. 18 IDEC Sport entry driven by three-time Le Mans winner André Lotterer, which placed only 14th. Notable eliminations in the LMGT3 class included the No. 85 Iron Dames Porsche 911, 2024 edition-winning No. 31 Team WRT BMW M4, No. 87 Akkodis ASP Lexus RC F, and the championship-leading No. 33 TF Sport Corvette of Ben Keating.

Hyperpole was divided into two sessions for both Hypercar and LMP2/LMGT3, new for the 2025 edition of the 24 Hours: an initial 20-minute "H1" session comprising the cars that advanced from their class' initial qualifying, then a final 15-minute "H2" session to determine pole position among the fastest cars of the H1 session. Hypercar entries which failed to reach the H2 pole shootout included No. 009 Aston Martin Valkyrie, qualifying 15th, and the No. 83 and 2023 edition-winning No. 51 Ferrari 499Ps, qualifying 11th and 13th respectively. In the LMP2/LMGT3 session, LMP2 entries eliminated in the H1 session included both Algarve Pro Racing cars, IDEC Sport's No. 28, and the No. 48 VDS Panis. LMGT3 saw a late lap set by Sean Gelael in the No. 95 United Autosports McLaren 720S, which had broken down on the Mulsanne Straight with only five minutes left in the session. After managing to restart the car, his final push lap was fast enough to place him into the H2 session.

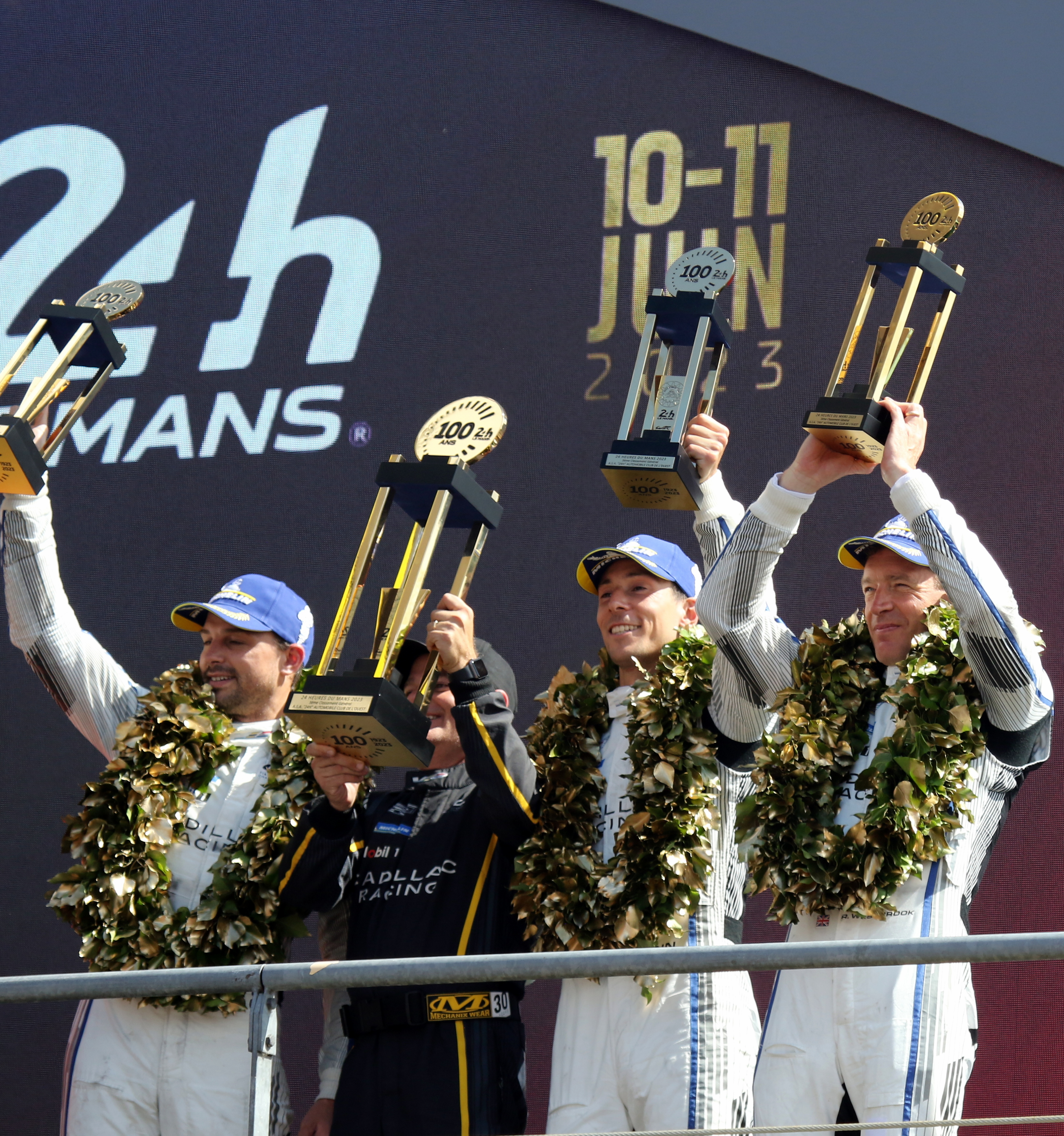
Alex Lynn (second from right) and Earl Bamber (first from left) placed third at the 2023 24 Hours of Le Mans while driving for Cadillac (pictured); they achieved first and second positions respectively during qualifying for the 2025 race.

Cadillac scored both pole and second position during the final qualifying session, the marque's second pole in the WEC, its first ever pole at Le Mans, and the first American manufacturer to achieve a pole at Le Mans since the 1967 running. The pole time of 3:23.166 was set by Alex Lynn driving the No. 12 on the last flying lap of the session, and a 3:23.333 by Earl Bamber in the No. 38 secured second from the benchmark-setting No. 5 Porsche 963 driven by Matheiu Jaminet, whose final position was third. Fourth through ninth were taken by the No. 15 BMW, No. 4 Porsche, No. 20 BMW, No. 50 Ferrari, No. 36 Alpine, and No. 311 Cadillac. A lock-up by Sebastien Buemi in the No. 8 Toyota early in the session forced the car off-circuit at Mulsanne Corner, causing a puncture and forcing the car back to the pits without setting a time, placing him tenth on the grid.

LMP2 pole was won by the No. 29 TDS Panis Racing entry, with driver Mathias Beche setting a 3:35.062 lap time. The top five in LMP2 was completed by the No. 43 Inter Europol, the No. 199 AO by TF, and the No. 23 and 22 United Autosports entries, with the No. 37 CLX-Pure Rxcing, No. 183 AF Corse and No. 16 RLR M Sport Orecas placing sixth, seventh, and eighth. In LMGT3, Mattia Drudi's No. 27 Aston Martin Vantage managed to beat Alesso Rovera in the No. 21 Vista Ferrari 296, who had set a provisional lap record halfway through the H2 session; their times were 3:52.789 and 3:53.085 respectively. Behind them was the No. 46 BMW M4 driven by Valentino Rossi, who placed third despite being a lower-rated driver than all but one of the other LMGT3 H2 competitors. Fourth and fifth fastest were Maxime Martin's No. 61 Iron Lynx Mercedes-AMG and Richard Lietz's No. 92 Manthey Porsche 911, followed by the No. 81 TF Sport Corvette driven by Rui Andrade — the other Silver-rated LMGT3 driver in the session — then the No. 95 United Autosports McLaren and No. 78 Lexus in seventh and eighth.

=== Qualifying results ===
Pole positions in each class are denoted in bold.

Final qualifying classification
Pos	Class	No.	Team	Qualifying	Hyperpole 1	Hyperpole 2	Grid
1	**Hypercar**	**12**	**Cadillac Hertz Team Jota**	3:22.847	3:23.641	**3:23.166**	1
2	Hypercar	38	Cadillac Hertz Team Jota	3:23.467	3:23.141	3:23.333	2
3	Hypercar	5	Porsche Penske Motorsport	3:23.544	3:23.979	3:23.475	3
4	Hypercar	15	BMW M Team WRT	3:22.887	3:24.061	3:23.659	4
5	Hypercar	4	Porsche Penske Motorsport	3:24.584	3:23.547	3:23.983	5
6	Hypercar	20	BMW M Team WRT	3:23.805	3:23.250	3:24.009	6
7	Hypercar	50	Ferrari AF Corse	3:23.514	3:23.273	3:24.213	7
8	Hypercar	311	Cadillac Whelen	3:23.890	3:22.742	3:24.380	8
9	Hypercar	36	Alpine Endurance Team	3:23.945	3:23.462	3:24.398	9
10	Hypercar	8	Toyota Gazoo Racing	3:23.988	3:23.546	No time	10
11	Hypercar	51	Ferrari AF Corse	3:23.163	3:24.143		11
12	Hypercar	35	Alpine Endurance Team	3:24.667	3:24.153		12
13	Hypercar	83	AF Corse	3:23.994	3:24.327		13
14	Hypercar	101	Cadillac WTR	3:24.030	3:24.811		14
15	Hypercar	009	Aston Martin THOR Team	3:24.869	3:25.258		15
16	Hypercar	7	Toyota Gazoo Racing	3:25.062			16
17	Hypercar	94	Peugeot TotalEnergies	3:25.240			17
18	Hypercar	93	Peugeot TotalEnergies	3:25.494			18
19	Hypercar	99	Proton Competition	3:25.527			19
20	Hypercar	007	Aston Martin THOR Team	3:26.349			20
21	Hypercar	6	Porsche Penske Motorsport	3:23.360			21^{1}
22	**LMP2 Pro-Am**	**29**	**TDS Racing**	3:36.163	3:35.933	**3:35.062**	22
23	**LMP2**	**43**	**Inter Europol Competition**	3:36.958	3:34.657	3:35.333	23
24	LMP2 Pro-Am	199	AO by TF	3:35.472	3:35.298	3:35.421	24
25	LMP2 Pro-Am	23	United Autosports	3:35.657	3:36.463	3:35.459	25
26	LMP2	22	United Autosports	3:36.536	3:35.473	3:35.615	26
27	LMP2	37	CLX – Pure Rxcing	3:37.652	3:36.365	3:36.184	27
28	LMP2 Pro-Am	183	AF Corse	3:37.394	3:36.323	3:36.993	28
29	LMP2 Pro-Am	16	RLR MSport	3:37.119	3:36.468	3:38.922	29
30	LMP2	28	IDEC Sport	3:37.004	3:36.675		30
31	LMP2 Pro-Am	45	Algarve Pro Racing	3:35.954	3:36.834		31
32	LMP2	48	VDS Panis Racing	3:36.588	3:36.844		32
33	LMP2	25	Algarve Pro Racing	3:36.612	3:37.120		33
34	LMP2 Pro-Am	11	Proton Competition	3:37.767			34
35	LMP2	18	IDEC Sport	3:37.940			35
36	LMP2	9	Iron Lynx – Proton	3:38.548			36
37	LMP2 Pro-Am	34	Inter Europol Competition	3:39.328			37
38	LMP2 Pro-Am	24	Nielsen Racing	3:40.271			38
39	**LMGT3**	**27**	**Heart of Racing Team**	3:57.083	3:54.718	**3:52.789**	39
40	LMGT3	21	Vista AF Corse	3:58.116	3:54.745	3:53.085	40
41	LMGT3	46	Team WRT	3:56.875	3:54.345	3:54.966	41
42	LMGT3	61	Iron Lynx	3:58.732	3:54.731	3:54.998	42
43	LMGT3	92	Manthey 1st Phorm	3:57.255	3:54.659	3:55.140	43
44	LMGT3	81	TF Sport	3:57.690	3:54.646	3:55.740	44
45	LMGT3	95	United Autosports	3:58.977	3:55.186	3:55.965	45
46	LMGT3	78	Akkodis ASP Team	3:57.321	3:54.934	4:03.660	46
47	LMGT3	193	Ziggo Sport – Tempesta	3:57.960	3:55.853		47
48	LMGT3	88	Proton Competition	3:57.827	3:56.160		48
49	LMGT3	59	United Autosports	3:58.106	3:56.171		49
50	LMGT3	54	Vista AF Corse	3:58.632			50
51	LMGT3	77	Proton Competition	3:59.004			51
52	LMGT3	87	Akkodis ASP Team	3:59.037			52
53	LMGT3	57	Kessel Racing	3:59.092			53
54	LMGT3	31	The Bend Team WRT	3:59.288			54
55	LMGT3	10	Racing Spirit of Léman	3:59.472			55
56	LMGT3	85	Iron Dames	4:00.026			56
57	LMGT3	90	Manthey	4:00.450			57
58	LMGT3	13	AWA Racing	4:01.099			58
59	LMGT3	150	Richard Mille AF Corse	No time			59
60	LMGT3	33	TF Sport	No time			60
61	LMGT3	60	Iron Lynx	No time			61
62	LMGT3	63	Iron Lynx	No time			62

Notes

- **^1** – The #6 Porsche Penske Motorsport car set the fourth fastest time in Hypercar qualifying, but was disqualified from the result and demoted to the back of the Hypercar grid for the car being found underweight in post-qualifying scrutineering. The #009 Aston Martin THOR Team car had taken its place in Hyperpole 1.

== Race ==
=== Start and early hours ===
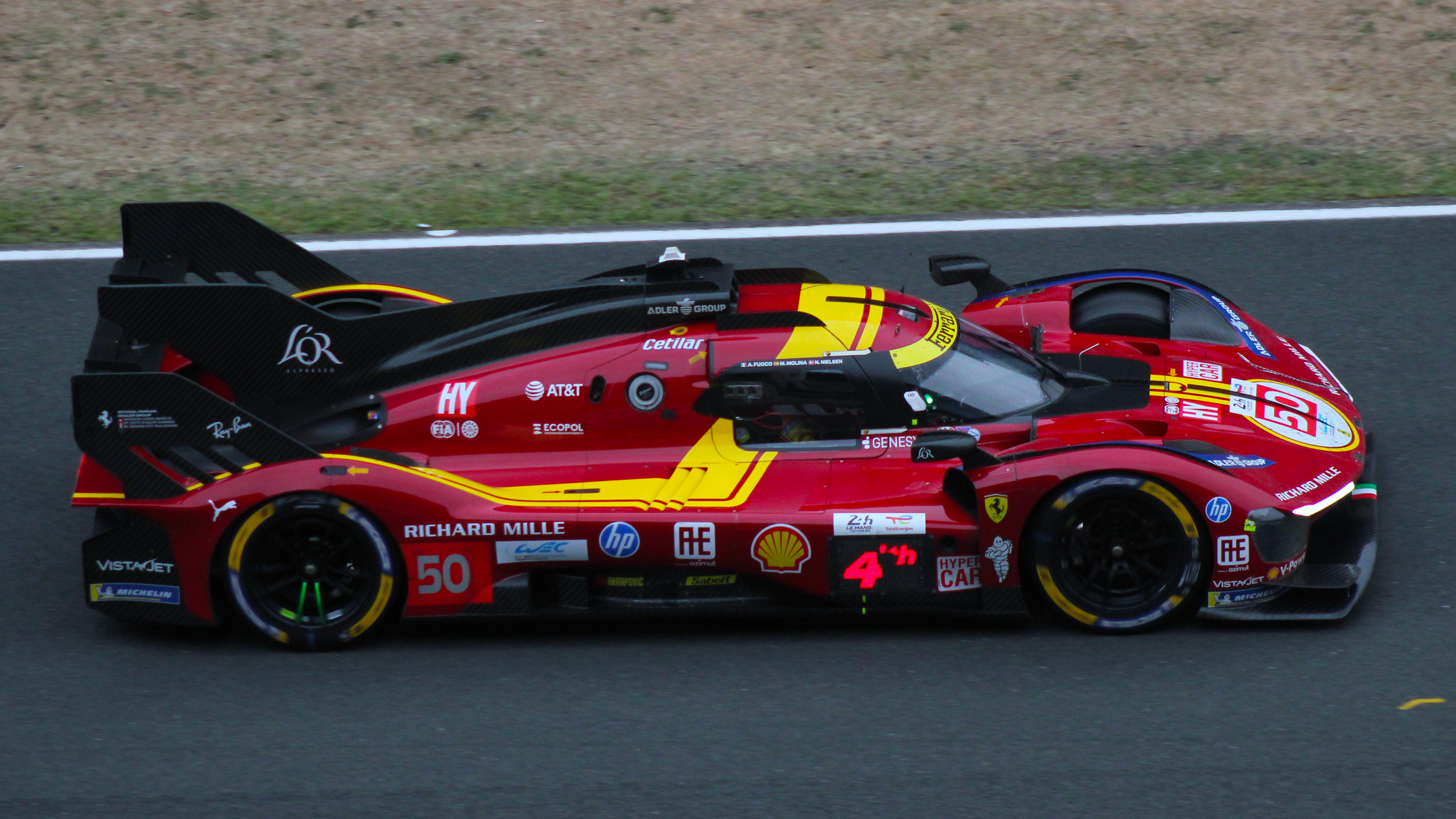
The No. 50 Ferrari 499P led much of the early race, but was later disqualified due to a violation of maximum deflection regulations.

Air temperature at the start of the race was 21.9 °C (71.4 °F) and ranged from 15.6 to 24.4 °C (60.1 to 75.9 °F), while starting track temperature was 27.5 °C (81.5 °F) and ranged from 21.2 to 33.6 °C (70.2 to 92.5 °F). The track was dry throughout. Attendance was reported as 332,000, a record for the event. Former professional tennis player Roger Federer was the official race starter. Despite qualifying first and second, the No. 12 and No. 38 JOTA Cadillac V-Series.Rs of Will Stevens and Earl Bamber were overtaken on the first lap by third-place qualifier Julien Andlauer in the No. 5 Penske Porsche 963, making the passes at Tertre Rouge and on the Mulsanne Straight before the first chicane. The No. 6 of Kévin Estre, which started from 21st position after its disqualification from qualifying, had climbed up to 14th by the end of the first lap, and had reached fifth place by the end of the first hour of racing, behind Andlauer's Porsche, Stevens' and Bamber's Cadillacs, and the No. 50 Ferrari 499P of Nicklas Nielsen. The BMW M Hybrid V8s — René Rast's No. 20 and Kevin Magnussen's No. 15 — were placed seventh and 10th, behind Jack Aitken in the sixth-place No. 311 Action Express Cadillac; the No. 51 Ferrari of James Calado and No. 8 Toyota GR010 of Sébastien Buemi were eighth and ninth. The No. 93 Peugeot 9X8 driven by Paul di Resta suffered the first significant Hypercar incident of the race, crashing at the Porsche Curves, rejoining the race after a 92-second pit stop to replace the rear bodywork.

In LMP2, the class was initially led by the Pro-Am No. 29 TDS and No. 199 AO by TF entrants; in the first pit stop these cars swapped from their fastest Gold-rated drivers (Mathias Beche and Louis Delétraz respectively) to their Bronze-rated amateur drivers, Rodrigo Sales and P. J. Hyett, handing the class lead at the end of the first hour to the Pro No. 43 Inter Europol entry, driven at the time by Tom Dillmann; the No. 29 and No. 199 ended the first hour in 11th and ninth. Second in LMP2 was Job van Uitert's No. 28 IDEC Sport, followed by the No. 16 RLR MSport, the best-placed Pro-Am entry. The only notable incident in this class was the No. 22 United Oreca of David Heinemeier Hansson colliding with the LMGT3-entered No. 193 Ziggo Sport Tempesta Ferrari 296 at the Dunlop chicane and causing a spin, for which he received an official warning. Initial lead of the LMGT3 class was held by pole-sitter Mattia Drudi's No. 27 Heart of Racing Aston Martin Vantage, but, like the LMP2 pole-sitter, surrendered the class lead after swapping to Bronze-rated Ian James, their amateur driver; class lead passed to the No. 78 Akkodis ASP Lexus of Jack Hawksworth.

After the first two sets of Hypercar pit stops, the No. 50 Ferrari, still driven by Nielsen, had advanced up to second place behind Andlauer's No. 5 Porsche after overtakes on the No. 6 Porsche of Kévin Estre and the two JOTA Cadillacs, which continued to drop down the order in the opening stages. Lead in LMP2 passed to Patrick Pilet's No. 16 RLR MSport Oreca after a driver change from the No. 43 Inter Europol car, and in LMGT3 — all teams having swapped to their Bronze-rated drivers by the end of the second hour — Ahmed Al Harthy's No. 46 had gained a ten-second lead on the trailing No. 78 Lexus. The second hour also saw the first penalties of the race, given to Keating's No. 33 in LMGT3 and Malykhin's CLX Pure Rxcing in LMP2 for contact, to the No. 28 IDEC for an unsafe pit stop release, and to the No. 22 United for course-cutting.

After drivers swaps for the No. 50 Ferrari (to Antonio Fuoco) and the No. 5 Porsche (to Mathieu Jaminet), the No. 50, able to use its new tyres better than the No. 5, closed the gap and overtook the Porsche at Indianapolis for the lead; the No. 5 was also overtaken by the No. 6 Porsche later the same hour. The No. 50 would keep its lead in Hypercar until receiving a drive-through penalty in the eighth hour of the race for a yellow flag infringement. Also climbing was the No. 51 Ferrari with Giovanazzi making overtakes on Dries Vanthoor's No. 15 BMW and Felipe Drugovich's No.311 Whelen Cadillac for fourth place. Both Alpines, already struggling, were given stop-go penalties for pit lane speeding. LMP2 lead passed back to the No. 43 Inter Europol after the No. 16 swapped to their Bronze driver, with the No. 48 VDS Panis of Franck Perera taking second; the No. 43 and No. 48 continued to battle for first and second through the night and into the morning.

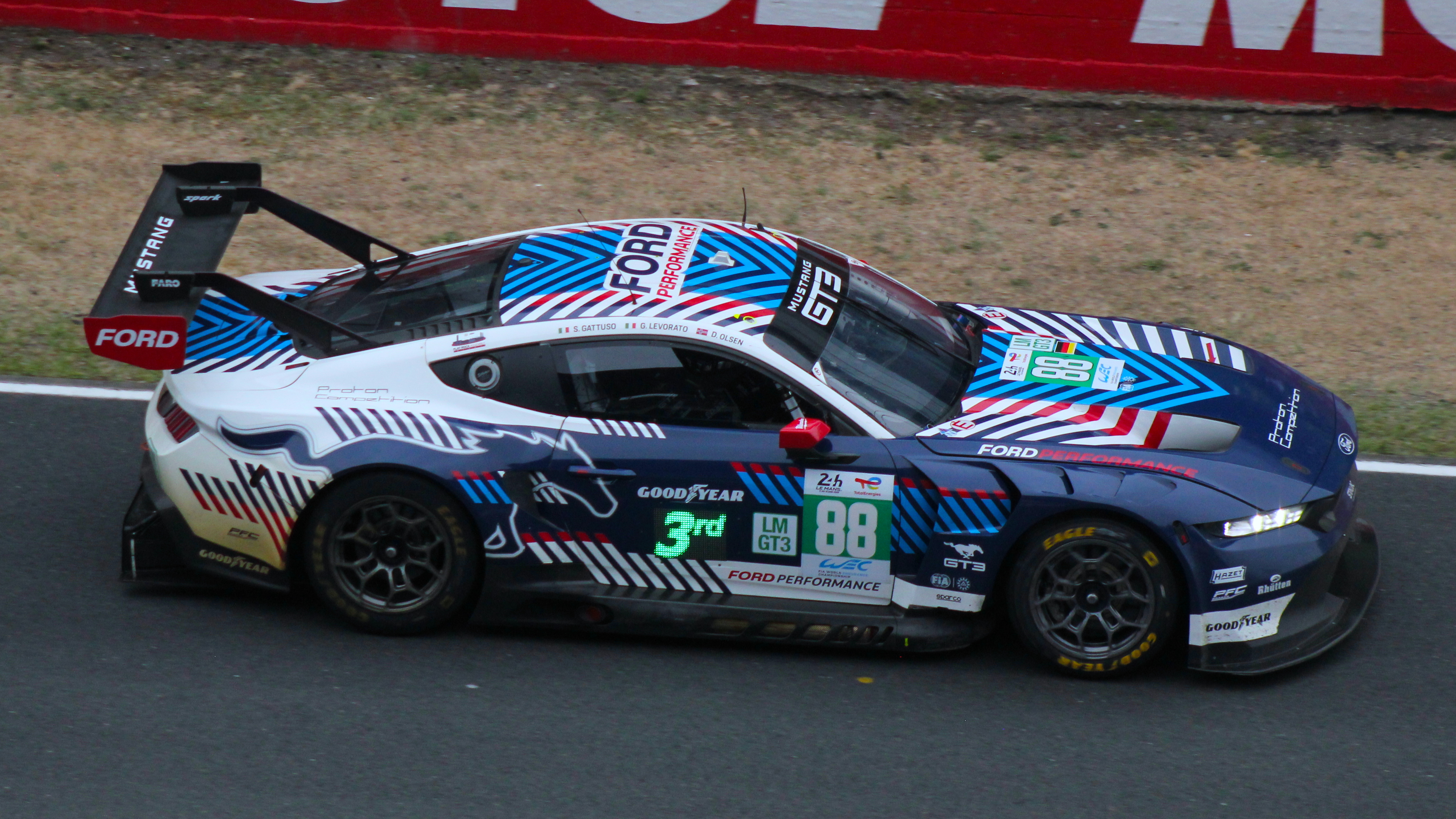
The No. 88 Proton Competition Ford Mustang GT3 was the first retirement of the race.

Laurens Vanthoor's No. 6 Porsche was overtaken by Kubica's No. 83 and Giovanazzi's No. 51 in the fourth hour, creating a Ferrari 1–2–3, while No. 20 BMW climbed to fifth behind the Porsche. Also in the fourth hour, the first major incident — and first official retirement — took place, with the No. 88 Proton Competition Ford Mustang, driven at the time by Giammarco Levorato, crashing at Tertre Rouge after losing grip. The slow zone created to clear Levorato's crash caused a further incident involving the No. 25 Algarve Pro Racing and No. 16 RLR MSport Orecas, the former hitting the rear of the latter as they slowed for the affected section of track. Two more retirements, both in the LMGT3 class, occurred in the first six hours: the No. 60 Iron Lynx Mercedes-AMG for a broken alternator belt and damaged oil line, and the No. 95 United McLaren for a drivetrain failure.

Six hours in, Ferrari had kept their 1–2–3 lead, behind whom were the No. 6 Porsche, No. 20 BMW, No. 8 Toyota, No. 12 JOTA Cadillac. The No. 94 Peugeot 9X8, running longer stints than others in the Hypercar class, was placed eighth. Already performing poorly compared to its sister car, the No. 7 Toyota was given a 50-second stop-go penalty after driver Kamui Kobayashi exceeded the pit lane speed limit by nearly 20 km/h (12 mph), though remained — with 15 of the 21 other Hypercar entrants — on the lead lap. A pit lane error also caused the No. 43 Inter Europol to lose the lead in LMP2 after it missed its designated pit box, putting it off sequence with its main competition, the No. 48 VDS Panis; the No. 199 AO by TF took second in LMP2 and the lead of the Pro-Am subclass after an overtake by Louis Delétraz on the No. 9 Iron Lynx Proton of Reshad de Gerus. Behind de Gerus was the No. 43 Inter Europol, then the No. 28 and No. 18 IDEC Sport entries, and then the second-in-subclass Pro-Am No. 29 TDS. At the top of LMGT3, first place was traded between the No. 46 Team WRT BMW M4, No. 21 Vista Ferrari 296, and No. 92 Manthey Porsche 911 over the first six hours in the course of several driver changes.

=== Night to morning ===
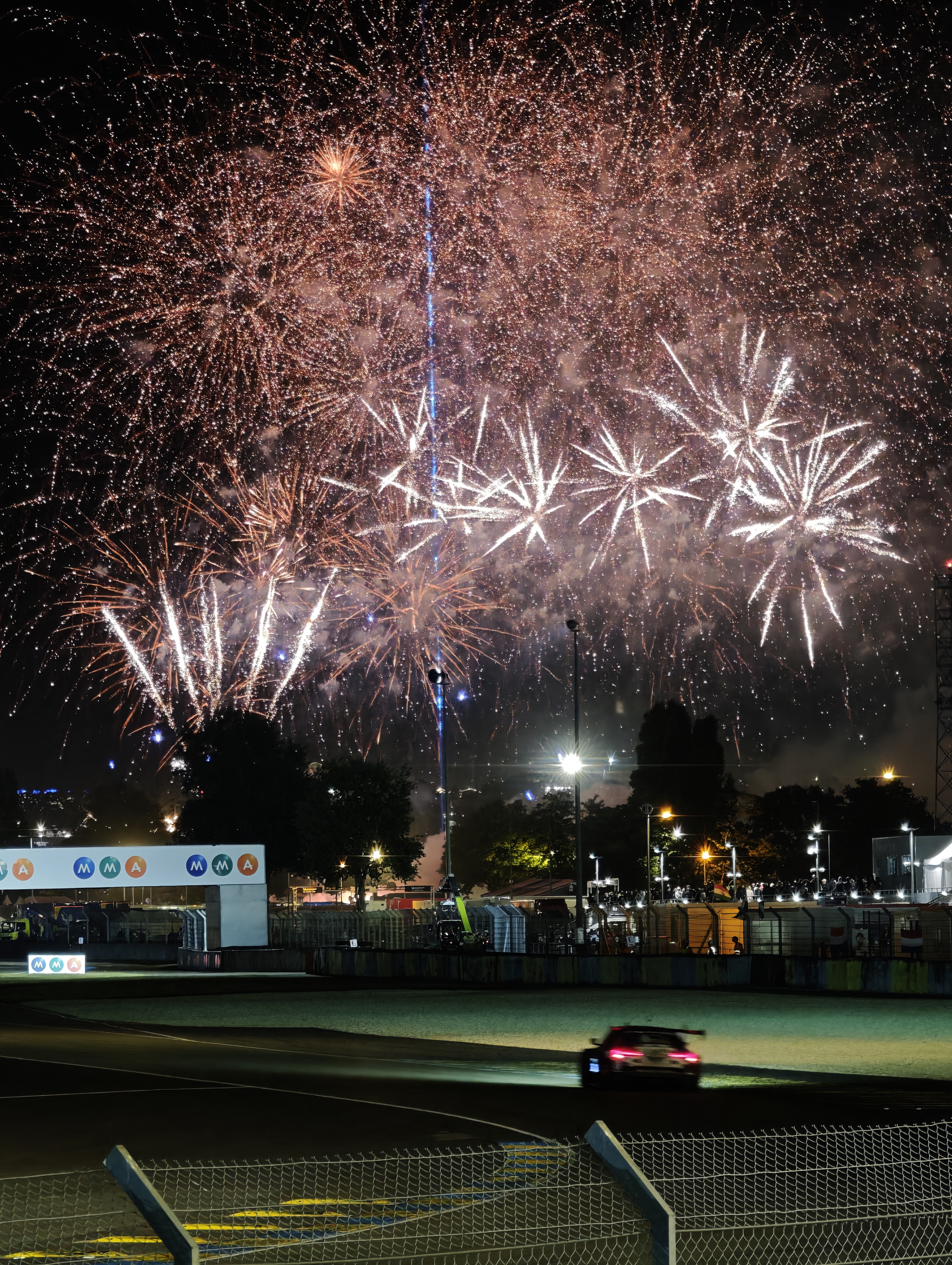
A Team WRT BMW M4 LMGT3 pictured at Karting corner during the midnight fireworks show; both WRT BMWs retired during the night.

As night fell, the No. 83 Ferrari of Phil Hanson took the lead of the race after the car's previous driver Yifei Ye closed the gap to the then-first No. 50 Ferrari. Prior to the next pit stops, and after the No. 50 was given a drive-through penalty, the No. 83 and then-second No. 51 of James Calado were ordered by Ferrari to swap their positions: Hanson instead ceded the position accidentally after a lock-up at Mulsanne Corner allowed Calado past. Lower down the Hypercar order, Paul-Loup Chatin's No. 35 Alpine and Loïc Duval's No. 94 Peugeot collided at Mulsanne Corner while battling for 14th, causing the Peugeot to spin, for which the Alpine was given a drive-through penalty. Another incident lost the No. 33 TF Sport Corvette two laps, a stuck wheel during a pit stop requiring servicing inside the team's garage. Battles for first continued in LMP2, between the briefly delayed No. 43 Inter Europol and the No. 48 VDS Panis, and in LMGT3 between the leading No. 46 Team WRT BMW M4 and the No. 92 Manthey Porsche 911 behind.

As the night drew on, several Hypercar teams began lengthening their stints to 13 laps, including the Penske Porsche 963s. After Calado's drive-through penalty for a yellow-flag infringement in the No. 50, and two penalties for the No. 51 Ferrari — one for causing a collision with the No. 33 TF Sport Corvette and one for speeding in the pit lane, which dropped the car down to eighth — the race lead passed to Kévin Estre in the last-qualifying No. 6 Porsche. Of the Ferrari 499Ps, only the No. 83 escaped penalties, remaining second in front of the No. 8 Toyota of Brendan Hartley. In LMGT3, the No. 46 Team WRT BMW of Ahmed Al Harthy, Valentino Rossi, and Kelvin van der Linde, which had led most of the race in its class, suffered a power steering failure in hour 11 and was forced to retire, promoting the No. 92 Manthey Porsche to lead in class, followed by the No. 21 Vista Ferrari 296, the two Akkodis ASP Lexuses, the No. 27 Heart of Racing Aston Martin Vantage, and the No. 81 TF Sport Corvette. The other Team WRT BMW M4, the No. 31, was also forced to retire after a collision with a rabbit during the night.

The race's only safety car period was triggered in hour 12 after Cem Bölükbaşı, driving the No. 24 Nielsen Oreca, lost control and crashed into the barriers at Tertre Rouge; it was the first retirement in the LMP2 class. The first Hypercar retirement, the No. 101 Wayne Taylor Racing Cadillac due to an engine failure, occurred just after the end of the safety car period. A slow pit stop for the No. 6 Porsche 963 promoted Ryō Hirakawa's No. 8 Toyota to the overall lead, though within the hour the race lead was retaken by the No. 83 Ferrari of Ye Yifei. Between the now-sixth No. 6 Porsche and the lead battle were the third- and fifth-place No. 51 and No. 50 Ferraris, the fourth-place No. 15 BMW, and fifth-place No. 12 JOTA Cadillac.

As dawn broke, the then third-in-class No. 18 IDEC Sport Oreca lost a wheel on the Mulsanne Straight and was retired; the remaining IDEC Sport entry, the No. 28, ran in third place in LMP2 behind the No. 48 VDS Panis and the No. 43 Inter Europol, followed in fourth and fifth by the No. 9 Iron Lynx Proton and the Pro-Am leading No. 199 AO by TF. Contact between the No. 85 Iron Dames Porsche of Rahel Frey and the No. 87 Akkodis ASP Lexus of Clemens Schmid caused Frey to spin into the gravel at the second Mulsanne Chicane, requiring a full course yellow for her retrieval and earning Schmid a drive-through penalty; Frey briefly lost drive in the car soon after. Immediately after the lifting of the full course yellow, Calado's No. 51 factory-run Ferrari 499P retook the lead from Hanson's privateer No. 83 Ferrari after a move to Calado's left just prior to Indianapolis. In LMGT3, the three main contenders had become the No. 92 Manthey Porsche, the No. 21 Vista Ferrari 296, and the No. 81 TF Sport Corvette. 13 different cars, including the No. 51 and No. 83 in Hypercar, the No. 9 in LMP2, and the No. 92 in LMGT3 were later given penalties for speeding during Frey's full course yellow. The penalties had little effect for the leaders, however, with Kubica in the No. 83 requesting permission from Ferrari to attack the factory No. 51 in first place and for the two cars to be swapped. Kubica lost several seconds in traffic during the next pit cycle, and the No. 51 remained ahead with six hours left to run. The No. 50 Ferrari of Antonio Fuoco followed in third, 34 seconds behind Kubica, then the No. 6 Porsche and No. 8 Toyota, 55 and 95 seconds behind the lead respectively; ten entries in the Hypercar class remained on the lead lap. Meanwhile, in LMGT3, Mattia Drudi's No. 27 Aston Martin passed Jack Hawksworth's No. 78 Lexus for fourth position.

The second retirement in Hypercar was the already-struggling No. 311 Whelen Cadillac, losing power in hour 17 of the race. Additional incidents took place for the No. 36 Alpine of Jules Gounon, who spun at Mulsanne Corner, the No. 10 Racing Spirit of Léman Aston Martin Vantage in LMGT3, and the No. 28 IDEC Sport in LMP2, colliding with the wall at Indianapolis and dropping it to fifth in class.

=== Afternoon to finish ===
In hour 20, the No. 78 Akkodis ASP Lexus, now driven by Finn Gehrsitz, suffered a race-ending suspension failure and required a full course yellow to clear up debris. During the full course yellow, the No. 51 Ferrari of Alessandro Pier Guidi entered the pits for an emergency service, then, as he approached the pits the next lap for a mandatory full-length stop, (Note: The pit lane is closed during a full course yellow, though cars are allowed to pit for an emergency service, which can include repairs and up to 10 seconds of refuelling. If an emergency service is taken, the car must return to the pits as soon as it re-opens.) spun the car after going off the tarmac. Pier Guidi lost 50 seconds, placing him in third, behind the No. 83 and No. 50 Ferraris and 10 seconds ahead of Laurens Vanthoor's No. 6 Porsche. Another mechanical setback affected the No. 8 Toyota, whose front-left wheel nut failed just after a pit stop, forcing it to slowly limp around the entire circuit before repairs could be carried out. It lost seven laps on the leader before it returned to the circuit. Issues also hindered both BMW Hypercars during the second to last hour: the No. 20 lost 37 minutes to engine repairs; the No. 15 struggling with its hybrid cooling system, making multiple stops in the garage and losing 26 laps to the leader. Another full course yellow was caused by another wheel nut failure, this time striking the third-place No. 28 IDEC Sport LMP2 entry and promoting the No. 199 to a podium position behind. Helped by the full course yellow combined with a well-timed pitstop, the No. 6 Porsche closed to within two seconds of the No. 50, which Ferrari told to swap positions with the No. 51 in response. Swapping to driver Matt Campbell, the No. 6 passed the No. 51 at the entrance of the second Mulsanne Chicane with two hours left in the race. The car remained ahead of the No. 51 and passed the No. 50 after the next two pit stops, choosing to save time and preserve track position by not taking fresh tyres in the second stop; it was 20 seconds behind the No. 83 with two hours left in the race.

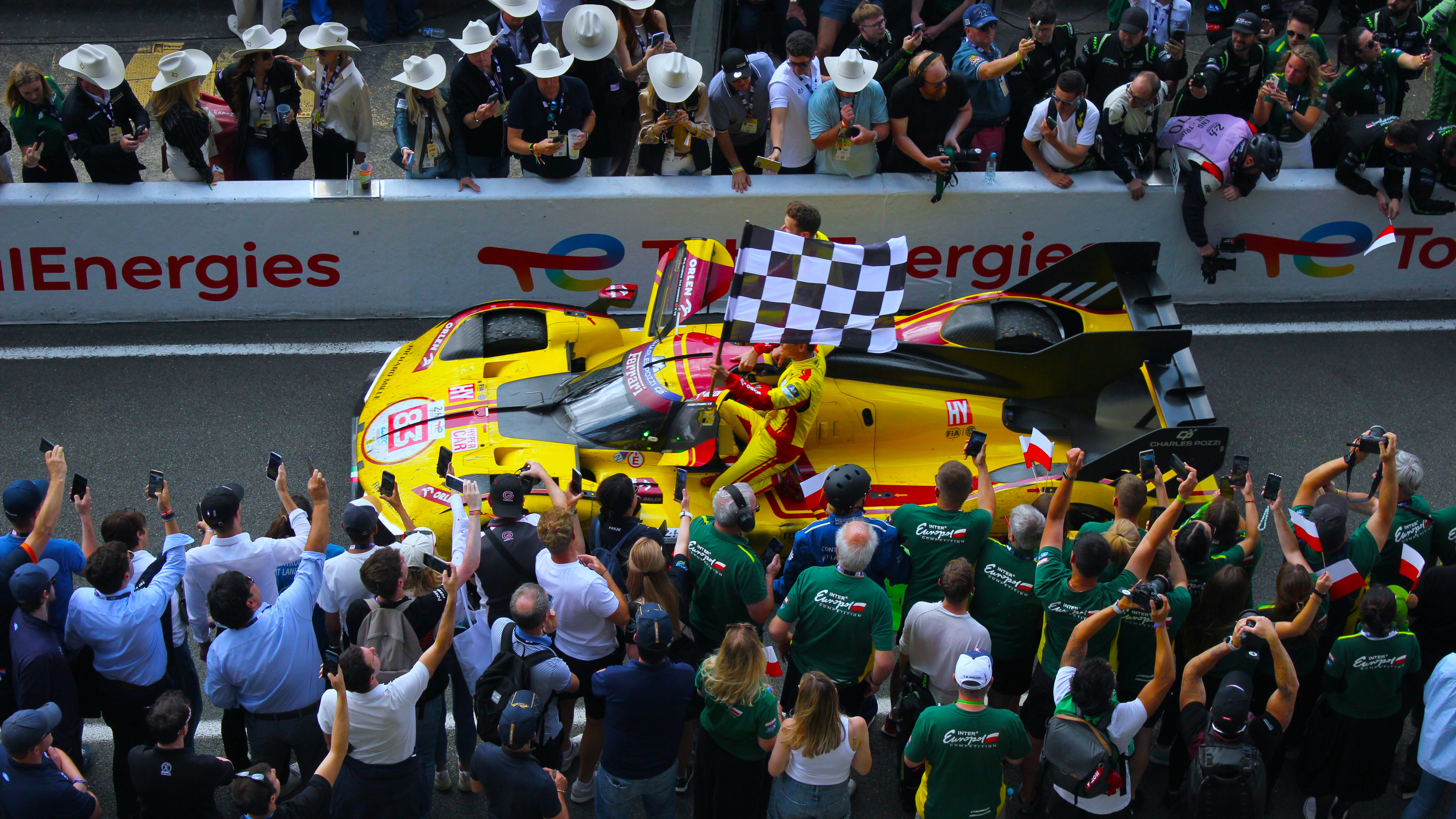
The No. 83 Ferrari 499P being driven to the podium after winning the race.

Brought to the finish line by Robert Kubica who drove the final 4-hour stint, the No. 83 Ferrari completed the race in first position, 14 seconds ahead of the chasing No. 6 Porsche. It was Ferrari's 3rd consecutive Le Mans victory and its 12th overall; Kubica and Ye were the first overall winners of Polish and Chinese nationality respectively. After a final driver swap to Kévin Estre, the No. 6 Porsche with fresh left-side tyres was able to preserve second place against the threats of the two factory Ferraris, the No. 51 crossing the finish line in third and the No. 50 in fourth, though the No. 50 was later disqualified for a technical infraction.

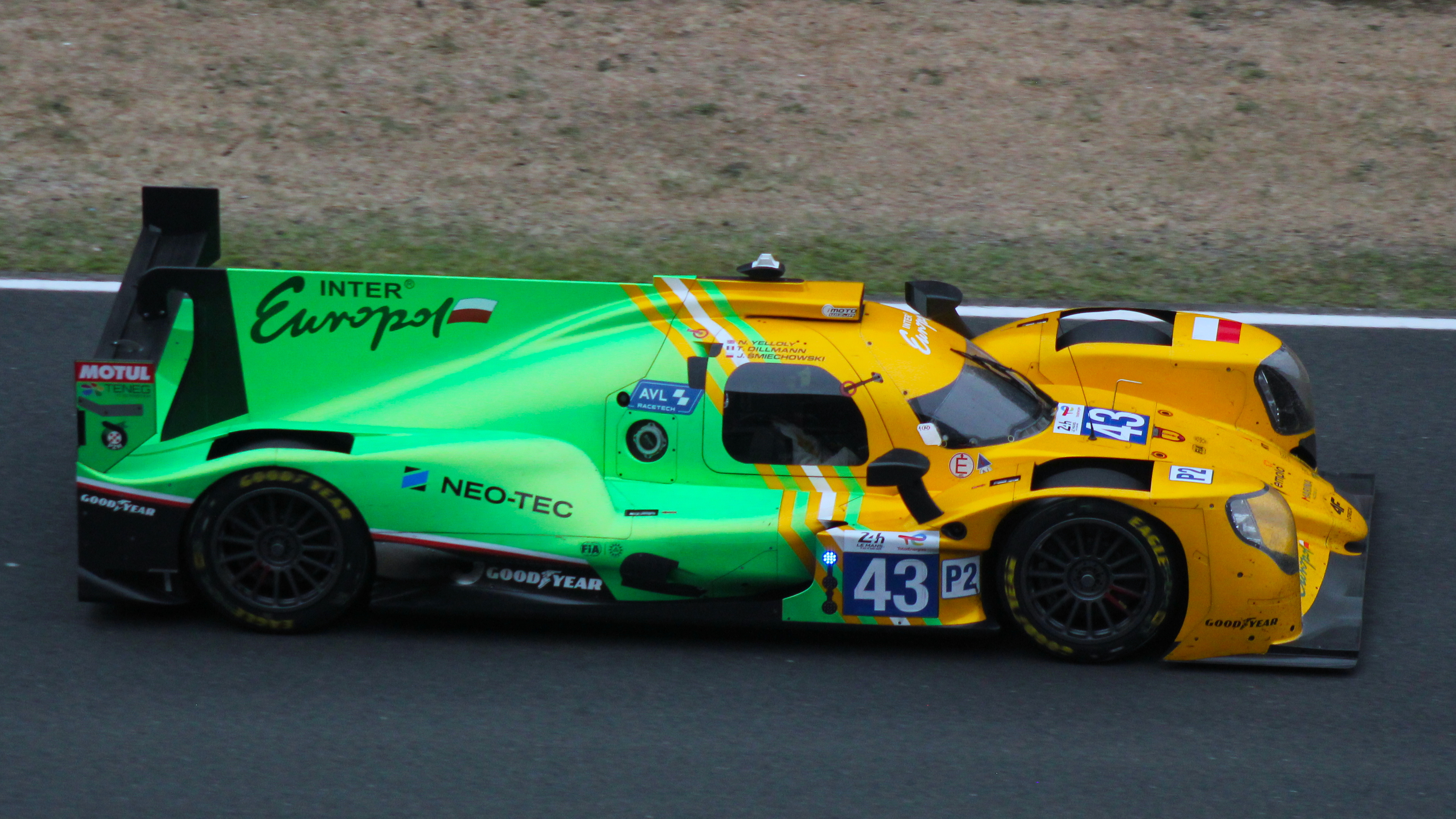
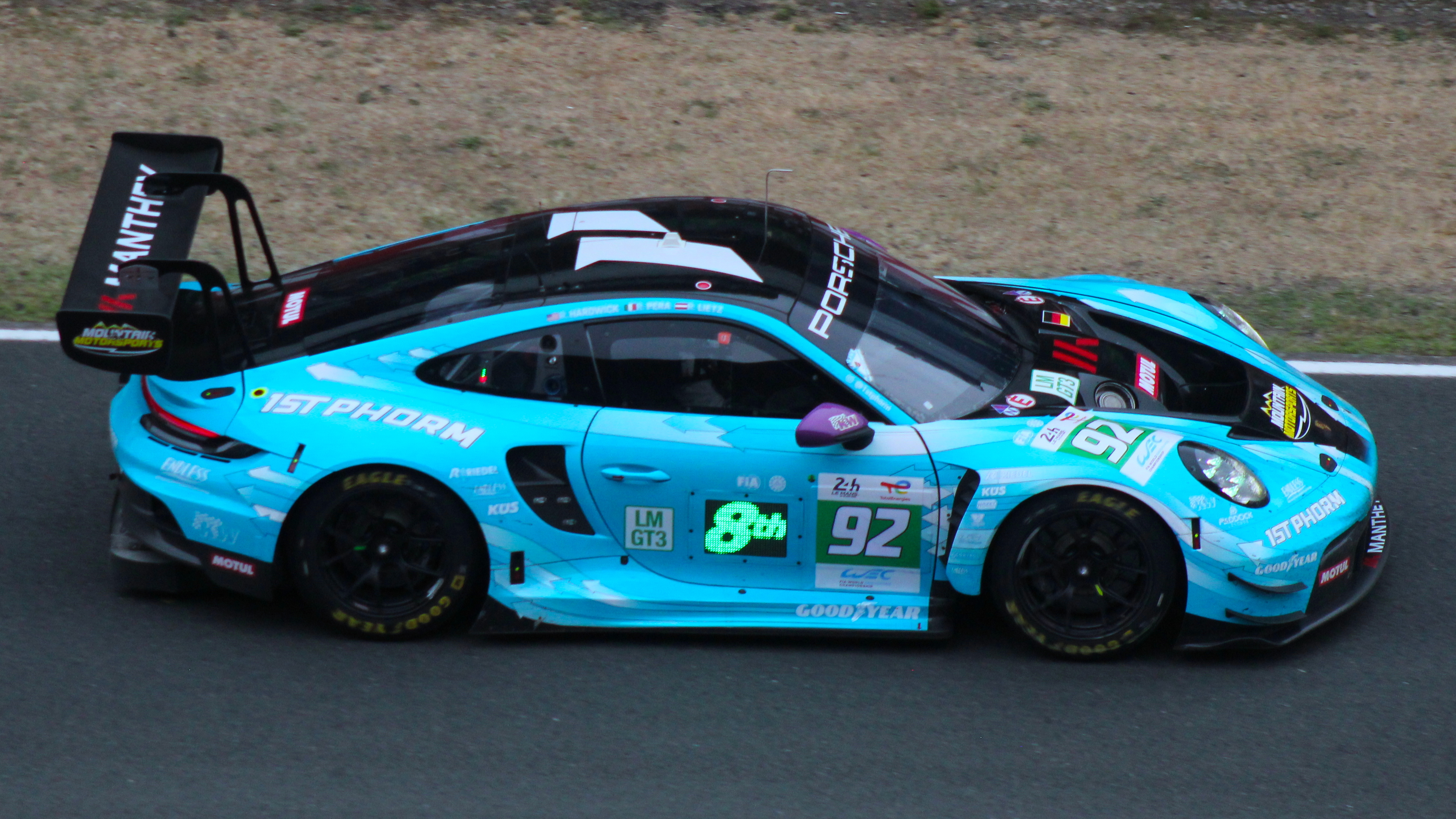
The No. 43 Inter Europol Competition Oreca 07 (left) won the LMP2 class, while the No. 92 Manthey Porsche 911 GT3 R (right) won the LMGT3 class.

In LMP2, the No. 43 Inter Europol was given a penalty for pit lane speeding, dropping them behind the No. 48 VDS Panis with one hour remaining. 40 minutes later, a mechanical issue caused the No. 48 to lose power, allowing the No. 43 to re-take first place; the No. 28 placed second in LMP2 ahead of the Pro-Am No. 199 AO by TF in third and Pro-class No. 9 Iron Lynx Proton in fourth. Both the fifth and sixth place overall finishers were Pro-Am entries, comprising the pole-sitting No. 29 TDS and No. 11 Proton Orecas, second and third in their subclass. Manthey's No. 92 Porsche finished first in the LMGT3 class, the team's second consecutive win, the first for drivers Ryan Hardwick and Riccardo Pera, and the sixth for Richard Lietz. Completing the podium were the No. 21 Vista Ferrari and No. 81 TF Sport Corvette; the pole-sitting No. 27 Heart of Racing Aston Martin finished fourth, and the No. 87 Akkodis ASP Lexus in fifth.

== Post-race ==
On 16 June, the No. 50 Ferrari, which finished fourth, was disqualified from the race due to a technical infringement regarding bolts located in the car's rear wing. The missing bolts allowed for a higher level of wing deflection than allowed by regulations; post-race testing showed the rear wing had 52 mm (2.0 in) of deflection when the maximum deflection allowed by FIA regulations was 15 mm (0.59 in). Ferrari-AF Corse contested the disqualification, arguing that the changes had no impact on the car's performance or safety.

== Official results ==
The minimum number of laps for classification (70 percent of the overall race winner's distance) was 270 laps. Class winners are denoted in bold and ‡.

Final race classification
Pos	Class	No.	Team	Drivers	Chassis	Tyre	Laps	Time/Reason
Pos	Class	No.	Team	Drivers	Engine	Tyre	Laps	Time/Reason
1	**Hypercar**	**83**	**(Italy) AF Corse**	**(United Kingdom) Phil Hanson (Poland) Robert Kubica (China) Yifei Ye**	**Ferrari 499P**	M	**387**	**24:02:53.332‡**
1	**Hypercar**	**83**	**(Italy) AF Corse**	**(United Kingdom) Phil Hanson (Poland) Robert Kubica (China) Yifei Ye**	**Ferrari F163CG 3.0 L Turbo V6**	M	**387**	**24:02:53.332‡**
2	Hypercar	6	(Germany) Porsche Penske Motorsport	(Australia) Matt Campbell (France) Kévin Estre (Belgium) Laurens Vanthoor	Porsche 963	M	387	+14.084
2	Hypercar	6	(Germany) Porsche Penske Motorsport	(Australia) Matt Campbell (France) Kévin Estre (Belgium) Laurens Vanthoor	Porsche 9RD 4.6 L Turbo V8	M	387	+14.084
3	Hypercar	51	(Italy) Ferrari AF Corse	(United Kingdom) James Calado (Italy) Antonio Giovinazzi (Italy) Alessandro Pier Guidi	Ferrari 499P	M	387	+28.487
3	Hypercar	51	(Italy) Ferrari AF Corse	(United Kingdom) James Calado (Italy) Antonio Giovinazzi (Italy) Alessandro Pier Guidi	Ferrari F163CG 3.0 L Turbo V6	M	387	+28.487
4	Hypercar	12	(United States) Cadillac Hertz Team Jota	(United Kingdom) Alex Lynn (France) Norman Nato (United Kingdom) Will Stevens	Cadillac V-Series.R	M	387	+2:18.639
4	Hypercar	12	(United States) Cadillac Hertz Team Jota	(United Kingdom) Alex Lynn (France) Norman Nato (United Kingdom) Will Stevens	Cadillac LMC55R 5.5 L V8	M	387	+2:18.639
5	Hypercar	7	(Japan) Toyota Gazoo Racing	(United Kingdom) Mike Conway (Japan) Kamui Kobayashi (Netherlands) Nyck de Vries	Toyota GR010 Hybrid	M	386	+1 lap
5	Hypercar	7	(Japan) Toyota Gazoo Racing	(United Kingdom) Mike Conway (Japan) Kamui Kobayashi (Netherlands) Nyck de Vries	Toyota H8909 3.5 L Turbo V6	M	386	+1 lap
6	Hypercar	5	(Germany) Porsche Penske Motorsport	(France) Julien Andlauer (Denmark) Michael Christensen (France) Mathieu Jaminet	Porsche 963	M	386	+1 lap
6	Hypercar	5	(Germany) Porsche Penske Motorsport	(France) Julien Andlauer (Denmark) Michael Christensen (France) Mathieu Jaminet	Porsche 9RD 4.6 L Turbo V8	M	386	+1 lap
7	Hypercar	38	(United States) Cadillac Hertz Team Jota	(New Zealand) Earl Bamber (France) Sébastien Bourdais (United Kingdom) Jenson Button	Cadillac V-Series.R	M	386	+1 lap
7	Hypercar	38	(United States) Cadillac Hertz Team Jota	(New Zealand) Earl Bamber (France) Sébastien Bourdais (United Kingdom) Jenson Button	Cadillac LMC55R 5.5 L V8	M	386	+1 lap
8	Hypercar	4	(Germany) Porsche Penske Motorsport	(Brazil) Felipe Nasr (United Kingdom) Nick Tandy (Germany) Pascal Wehrlein	Porsche 963	M	386	+1 lap
8	Hypercar	4	(Germany) Porsche Penske Motorsport	(Brazil) Felipe Nasr (United Kingdom) Nick Tandy (Germany) Pascal Wehrlein	Porsche 9RD 4.6 L Turbo V8	M	386	+1 lap
9	Hypercar	35	(France) Alpine Endurance Team	(France) Paul-Loup Chatin (Austria) Ferdinand Habsburg (France) Charles Milesi	Alpine A424	M	385	+2 laps
9	Hypercar	35	(France) Alpine Endurance Team	(France) Paul-Loup Chatin (Austria) Ferdinand Habsburg (France) Charles Milesi	Alpine V634 3.4 L Turbo V6	M	385	+2 laps
10	Hypercar	36	(France) Alpine Endurance Team	(France) Jules Gounon (France) Frédéric Makowiecki (Germany) Mick Schumacher	Alpine A424	M	384	+3 Laps
10	Hypercar	36	(France) Alpine Endurance Team	(France) Jules Gounon (France) Frédéric Makowiecki (Germany) Mick Schumacher	Alpine V634 3.4 L Turbo V6	M	384	+3 Laps
11	Hypercar	94	(France) Peugeot TotalEnergies	(France) Loïc Duval (Denmark) Malthe Jakobsen (Belgium) Stoffel Vandoorne	Peugeot 9X8	M	384	+3 Laps
11	Hypercar	94	(France) Peugeot TotalEnergies	(France) Loïc Duval (Denmark) Malthe Jakobsen (Belgium) Stoffel Vandoorne	Peugeot X6H 2.6 L Turbo V6	M	384	+3 Laps
12	Hypercar	009	(United States) Aston Martin THOR Team	(Canada) Roman De Angelis (Spain) Alex Riberas (Denmark) Marco Sørensen	Aston Martin Valkyrie	M	383	+4 Laps
12	Hypercar	009	(United States) Aston Martin THOR Team	(Canada) Roman De Angelis (Spain) Alex Riberas (Denmark) Marco Sørensen	Aston Martin RA 6.5 L V12	M	383	+4 Laps
13	Hypercar	99	(Germany) Proton Competition	(Switzerland) Neel Jani (Chile) Nico Pino (Argentina) Nicolás Varrone	Porsche 963	M	383	+4 Laps
13	Hypercar	99	(Germany) Proton Competition	(Switzerland) Neel Jani (Chile) Nico Pino (Argentina) Nicolás Varrone	Porsche 9RD 4.6 L Turbo V8	M	383	+4 Laps
14	Hypercar	007	(United States) Aston Martin THOR Team	(United Kingdom) Tom Gamble (United Kingdom) Ross Gunn (United Kingdom) Harry Tincknell	Aston Martin Valkyrie	M	381	+6 Laps
14	Hypercar	007	(United States) Aston Martin THOR Team	(United Kingdom) Tom Gamble (United Kingdom) Ross Gunn (United Kingdom) Harry Tincknell	Aston Martin RA 6.5 L V12	M	381	+6 Laps
15	Hypercar	8	(Japan) Toyota Gazoo Racing	(Switzerland) Sébastien Buemi (New Zealand) Brendon Hartley (Japan) Ryō Hirakawa	Toyota GR010 Hybrid	M	380	+7 Laps
15	Hypercar	8	(Japan) Toyota Gazoo Racing	(Switzerland) Sébastien Buemi (New Zealand) Brendon Hartley (Japan) Ryō Hirakawa	Toyota H8909 3.5 L Turbo V6	M	380	+7 Laps
16	Hypercar	93	(France) Peugeot TotalEnergies	(United Kingdom) Paul di Resta (Denmark) Mikkel Jensen (France) Jean-Éric Vergne	Peugeot 9X8	M	379	+8 Laps
16	Hypercar	93	(France) Peugeot TotalEnergies	(United Kingdom) Paul di Resta (Denmark) Mikkel Jensen (France) Jean-Éric Vergne	Peugeot X6H 2.6 L Turbo V6	M	379	+8 Laps
17	Hypercar	20	(Germany) BMW M Team WRT	(Netherlands) Robin Frijns (Germany) René Rast (South Africa) Sheldon van der Linde	BMW M Hybrid V8	M	375	+12 Laps
17	Hypercar	20	(Germany) BMW M Team WRT	(Netherlands) Robin Frijns (Germany) René Rast (South Africa) Sheldon van der Linde	BMW P66/3 4.0 L Turbo V8	M	375	+12 Laps
18	**LMP2**	**43**	**(Poland) Inter Europol Competition**	**(France) Tom Dillmann (Poland) Jakub Śmiechowski (United Kingdom) Nick Yelloly**	**Oreca 07**	G	**367**	**+20 Laps‡**
18	**LMP2**	**43**	**(Poland) Inter Europol Competition**	**(France) Tom Dillmann (Poland) Jakub Śmiechowski (United Kingdom) Nick Yelloly**	**Gibson GK428 4.2 L V8**	G	**367**	**+20 Laps‡**
19	LMP2	48	(France) VDS Panis Racing	(United Kingdom) Oliver Gray (France) Esteban Masson (France) Franck Perera	Oreca 07	G	367	+20 Laps
19	LMP2	48	(France) VDS Panis Racing	(United Kingdom) Oliver Gray (France) Esteban Masson (France) Franck Perera	Gibson GK428 4.2 L V8	G	367	+20 Laps
20	**LMP2 (Pro-Am)**	**199**	**(United States) AO by TF**	**(United States) Dane Cameron (Switzerland) Louis Delétraz (United States) P. J. Hyett**	**Oreca 07**	G	**366**	**+21 Laps‡**
20	**LMP2 (Pro-Am)**	**199**	**(United States) AO by TF**	**(United States) Dane Cameron (Switzerland) Louis Delétraz (United States) P. J. Hyett**	**Gibson GK428 4.2 L V8**	G	**366**	**+21 Laps‡**
21	LMP2	9	(Germany) Iron Lynx – Proton	(France) Macéo Capietto (France) Reshad de Gerus (Germany) Jonas Ried	Oreca 07	G	365	+22 Laps
21	LMP2	9	(Germany) Iron Lynx – Proton	(France) Macéo Capietto (France) Reshad de Gerus (Germany) Jonas Ried	Gibson GK428 4.2 L V8	G	365	+22 Laps
22	LMP2 (Pro-Am)	29	(France) TDS Racing	(Switzerland) Mathias Beche (France) Clément Novalak (United States) Rodrigo Sales	Oreca 07	G	365	+22 Laps
22	LMP2 (Pro-Am)	29	(France) TDS Racing	(Switzerland) Mathias Beche (France) Clément Novalak (United States) Rodrigo Sales	Gibson GK428 4.2 L V8	G	365	+22 Laps
23	LMP2 (Pro-Am)	11	(Germany) Proton Competition	(Austria) René Binder (Italy) Giorgio Roda (Netherlands) Bent Viscaal	Oreca 07	G	365	+22 Laps
23	LMP2 (Pro-Am)	11	(Germany) Proton Competition	(Austria) René Binder (Italy) Giorgio Roda (Netherlands) Bent Viscaal	Gibson GK428 4.2 L V8	G	365	+22 Laps
24	LMP2	22	(United Kingdom) United Autosports	(Brazil) Pietro Fittipaldi (Denmark) David Heinemeier Hansson (Netherlands) Renger van der Zande	Oreca 07	G	364	+23 Laps
24	LMP2	22	(United Kingdom) United Autosports	(Brazil) Pietro Fittipaldi (Denmark) David Heinemeier Hansson (Netherlands) Renger van der Zande	Gibson GK428 4.2 L V8	G	364	+23 Laps
25	LMP2	25	(Portugal) Algarve Pro Racing	(Spain) Lorenzo Fluxá (Liechtenstein) Matthias Kaiser (France) Théo Pourchaire	Oreca 07	G	364	+23 Laps
25	LMP2	25	(Portugal) Algarve Pro Racing	(Spain) Lorenzo Fluxá (Liechtenstein) Matthias Kaiser (France) Théo Pourchaire	Gibson GK428 4.2 L V8	G	364	+23 Laps
26	LMP2 (Pro-Am)	183	(Italy) AF Corse	(Portugal) António Félix da Costa (France) François Perrodo (France) Matthieu Vaxivière	Oreca 07	G	364	+23 Laps
26	LMP2 (Pro-Am)	183	(Italy) AF Corse	(Portugal) António Félix da Costa (France) François Perrodo (France) Matthieu Vaxivière	Gibson GK428 4.2 L V8	G	364	+23 Laps
27	LMP2 (Pro-Am)	34	(Poland) Inter Europol Competition	(United States) Nick Boulle (Italy) Luca Ghiotto (France) Jean-Baptiste Simmenauer	Oreca 07	G	363	+24 Laps
27	LMP2 (Pro-Am)	34	(Poland) Inter Europol Competition	(United States) Nick Boulle (Italy) Luca Ghiotto (France) Jean-Baptiste Simmenauer	Gibson GK428 4.2 L V8	G	363	+24 Laps
28	LMP2 (Pro-Am)	23	(United Kingdom) United Autosports	(United Kingdom) Ben Hanley (United Kingdom) Oliver Jarvis (Brazil) Daniel Schneider	Oreca 07	G	363	+24 Laps
28	LMP2 (Pro-Am)	23	(United Kingdom) United Autosports	(United Kingdom) Ben Hanley (United Kingdom) Oliver Jarvis (Brazil) Daniel Schneider	Gibson GK428 4.2 L V8	G	363	+24 Laps
29	LMP2 (Pro-Am)	16	(United Kingdom) RLR MSport	(Republic of Ireland) Ryan Cullen (Denmark) Michael Jensen (France) Patrick Pilet	Oreca 07	G	362	+25 Laps
29	LMP2 (Pro-Am)	16	(United Kingdom) RLR MSport	(Republic of Ireland) Ryan Cullen (Denmark) Michael Jensen (France) Patrick Pilet	Gibson GK428 4.2 L V8	G	362	+25 Laps
30	LMP2 (Pro-Am)	45	(Portugal) Algarve Pro Racing	(Netherlands) Nicky Catsburg (United States) George Kurtz (United Kingdom) Alex Quinn	Oreca 07	G	362	+25 Laps
30	LMP2 (Pro-Am)	45	(Portugal) Algarve Pro Racing	(Netherlands) Nicky Catsburg (United States) George Kurtz (United Kingdom) Alex Quinn	Gibson GK428 4.2 L V8	G	362	+25 Laps
31	Hypercar	15	(Germany) BMW M Team WRT	(Denmark) Kevin Magnussen (Switzerland) Raffaele Marciello (Belgium) Dries Vanthoor	BMW M Hybrid V8	M	361	+26 Laps
31	Hypercar	15	(Germany) BMW M Team WRT	(Denmark) Kevin Magnussen (Switzerland) Raffaele Marciello (Belgium) Dries Vanthoor	BMW P66/3 4.0 L Turbo V8	M	361	+26 Laps
32	LMP2	37	(Lithuania) CLX – Pure Rxcing	(United Kingdom) Tom Blomqvist (Saint Kitts and Nevis) Alex Malykhin (France) Tristan Vautier	Oreca 07	G	358	+29 Laps
32	LMP2	37	(Lithuania) CLX – Pure Rxcing	(United Kingdom) Tom Blomqvist (Saint Kitts and Nevis) Alex Malykhin (France) Tristan Vautier	Gibson GK428 4.2 L V8	G	358	+29 Laps
33	**LMGT3**	**92**	**(Germany) Manthey 1st Phorm**	**(United States) Ryan Hardwick (Austria) Richard Lietz (Italy) Riccardo Pera**	**Porsche 911 GT3 R (992)**	G	**341**	**+46 Laps‡**
33	**LMGT3**	**92**	**(Germany) Manthey 1st Phorm**	**(United States) Ryan Hardwick (Austria) Richard Lietz (Italy) Riccardo Pera**	**Porsche M97/80 4.2 L Flat-6**	G	**341**	**+46 Laps‡**
34	LMGT3	21	(Italy) Vista AF Corse	(France) François Hériau (United States) Simon Mann (Italy) Alessio Rovera	Ferrari 296 GT3	G	341	+46 Laps
34	LMGT3	21	(Italy) Vista AF Corse	(France) François Hériau (United States) Simon Mann (Italy) Alessio Rovera	Ferrari F163CE 3.0 L Turbo V6	G	341	+46 Laps
35	LMGT3	81	(United Kingdom) TF Sport	(Angola) Rui Andrade (Republic of Ireland) Charlie Eastwood (Belgium) Tom Van Rompuy	Chevrolet Corvette Z06 GT3.R	G	341	+46 Laps
35	LMGT3	81	(United Kingdom) TF Sport	(Angola) Rui Andrade (Republic of Ireland) Charlie Eastwood (Belgium) Tom Van Rompuy	Chevrolet LT6.R 5.5 L V8	G	341	+46 Laps
36	LMGT3	27	(United States) Heart of Racing Team	(Italy) Mattia Drudi (United Kingdom) Ian James (Canada) Zacharie Robichon	Aston Martin Vantage AMR GT3 Evo	G	341	+46 Laps
36	LMGT3	27	(United States) Heart of Racing Team	(Italy) Mattia Drudi (United Kingdom) Ian James (Canada) Zacharie Robichon	Aston Martin M177 4.0 L Turbo V8	G	341	+46 Laps
37	LMGT3	87	(France) Akkodis ASP Team	(Argentina) José María López (Austria) Clemens Schmid (Romania) Petru Umbrărescu	Lexus RC F GT3	G	340	+47 Laps
37	LMGT3	87	(France) Akkodis ASP Team	(Argentina) José María López (Austria) Clemens Schmid (Romania) Petru Umbrărescu	Lexus 2UR-GSE 5.4 L V8	G	340	+47 Laps
38	LMGT3	90	(Germany) Manthey	(Hong Kong) Antares Au (Austria) Klaus Bachler (Netherlands) Loek Hartog	Porsche 911 GT3 R (992)	G	340	+47 Laps
38	LMGT3	90	(Germany) Manthey	(Hong Kong) Antares Au (Austria) Klaus Bachler (Netherlands) Loek Hartog	Porsche M97/80 4.2 L Flat-6	G	340	+47 Laps
39	LMGT3	33	(United Kingdom) TF Sport	(United Kingdom) Jonny Edgar (Spain) Daniel Juncadella (United States) Ben Keating	Chevrolet Corvette Z06 GT3.R	G	339	+48 Laps
39	LMGT3	33	(United Kingdom) TF Sport	(United Kingdom) Jonny Edgar (Spain) Daniel Juncadella (United States) Ben Keating	Chevrolet LT6.R 5.5 L V8	G	339	+48 Laps
40	LMGT3	57	(Switzerland) Kessel Racing	(Japan) Takeshi Kimura (Brazil) Daniel Serra (United Kingdom) Casper Stevenson	Ferrari 296 GT3	G	339	+48 Laps
40	LMGT3	57	(Switzerland) Kessel Racing	(Japan) Takeshi Kimura (Brazil) Daniel Serra (United Kingdom) Casper Stevenson	Ferrari F163CE 3.0 L Turbo V6	G	339	+48 Laps
41	LMGT3	77	(Germany) Proton Competition	(United Kingdom) Ben Barker (Portugal) Bernardo Sousa (United Kingdom) Ben Tuck	Ford Mustang GT3	G	338	+49 Laps
41	LMGT3	77	(Germany) Proton Competition	(United Kingdom) Ben Barker (Portugal) Bernardo Sousa (United Kingdom) Ben Tuck	Ford Coyote 5.4 L V8	G	338	+49 Laps
42	LMGT3	13	(Canada) AWA Racing	(United Kingdom) Matt Bell (Canada) Orey Fidani (Germany) Lars Kern	Chevrolet Corvette Z06 GT3.R	G	338	+49 Laps
42	LMGT3	13	(Canada) AWA Racing	(United Kingdom) Matt Bell (Canada) Orey Fidani (Germany) Lars Kern	Chevrolet LT6.R 5.5 L V8	G	338	+49 Laps
43	LMGT3	150	(Italy) Richard Mille AF Corse	(Italy) Riccardo Agostini (Brazil) Custodio Toledo (France) Lilou Wadoux	Ferrari 296 GT3	G	338	+49 Laps
43	LMGT3	150	(Italy) Richard Mille AF Corse	(Italy) Riccardo Agostini (Brazil) Custodio Toledo (France) Lilou Wadoux	Ferrari F163CE 3.0 L Turbo V6	G	338	+49 Laps
44	LMGT3	61	(Italy) Iron Lynx	(Australia) Martin Berry (Netherlands) Lin Hodenius (Belgium) Maxime Martin	Mercedes-AMG GT3 Evo	G	337	+50 Laps
44	LMGT3	61	(Italy) Iron Lynx	(Australia) Martin Berry (Netherlands) Lin Hodenius (Belgium) Maxime Martin	Mercedes-AMG M159 6.2 L V8	G	337	+50 Laps
45	LMGT3	10	(France) Racing Spirit of Léman	(Brazil) Eduardo Barrichello (United States) Derek DeBoer (France) Valentin Hasse-Clot	Aston Martin Vantage AMR GT3 Evo	G	336	+51 Laps
45	LMGT3	10	(France) Racing Spirit of Léman	(Brazil) Eduardo Barrichello (United States) Derek DeBoer (France) Valentin Hasse-Clot	Aston Martin M177 4.0 L Turbo V8	G	336	+51 Laps
46	LMGT3	193	(United Kingdom) Ziggo Sport – Tempesta	(Italy) Eddie Cheever III (United Kingdom) Chris Froggatt (Hong Kong) Jonathan Hui	Ferrari 296 GT3	G	335	+52 Laps
46	LMGT3	193	(United Kingdom) Ziggo Sport – Tempesta	(Italy) Eddie Cheever III (United Kingdom) Chris Froggatt (Hong Kong) Jonathan Hui	Ferrari F163CE 3.0 L Turbo V6	G	335	+52 Laps
47	LMGT3	63	(Italy) Iron Lynx	(Australia) Brenton Grove (Australia) Stephen Grove (Germany) Luca Stolz	Mercedes-AMG GT3 Evo	G	334	+53 Laps
47	LMGT3	63	(Italy) Iron Lynx	(Australia) Brenton Grove (Australia) Stephen Grove (Germany) Luca Stolz	Mercedes-AMG M159 6.2 L V8	G	334	+53 Laps
48	LMGT3	85	(Italy) Iron Dames	(Belgium) Sarah Bovy (Switzerland) Rahel Frey (France) Célia Martin	Porsche 911 GT3 R (992)	G	334	+53 Laps
48	LMGT3	85	(Italy) Iron Dames	(Belgium) Sarah Bovy (Switzerland) Rahel Frey (France) Célia Martin	Porsche M97/80 4.2 L Flat-6	G	334	+53 Laps
DNF	LMGT3	59	(United Kingdom) United Autosports	(France) Sébastien Baud (United Kingdom) James Cottingham (Switzerland) Grégoire Saucy	McLaren 720S GT3 Evo	G	314	Not running
DNF	LMGT3	59	(United Kingdom) United Autosports	(France) Sébastien Baud (United Kingdom) James Cottingham (Switzerland) Grégoire Saucy	McLaren M840T 4.0 L Turbo V8	G	314	Not running
DNF	LMP2	28	(France) IDEC Sport	(Mexico) Sebastián Álvarez (France) Paul Lafargue (Netherlands) Job van Uitert	Oreca 07	G	308	Lost wheel
DNF	LMP2	28	(France) IDEC Sport	(Mexico) Sebastián Álvarez (France) Paul Lafargue (Netherlands) Job van Uitert	Gibson GK428 4.2 L V8	G	308	Lost wheel
DNF	LMGT3	78	(France) Akkodis ASP Team	(Germany) Finn Gehrsitz (United Kingdom) Jack Hawksworth (France) Arnold Robin	Lexus RC F GT3	G	268	Accident damage
DNF	LMGT3	78	(France) Akkodis ASP Team	(Germany) Finn Gehrsitz (United Kingdom) Jack Hawksworth (France) Arnold Robin	Lexus 2UR-GSE 5.4 L V8	G	268	Accident damage
DNF	Hypercar	311	(United States) Cadillac Whelen	(United Kingdom) Jack Aitken (Brazil) Felipe Drugovich (Denmark) Frederik Vesti	Cadillac V-Series.R	M	247	Engine
DNF	Hypercar	311	(United States) Cadillac Whelen	(United Kingdom) Jack Aitken (Brazil) Felipe Drugovich (Denmark) Frederik Vesti	Cadillac LMC55R 5.5 L V8	M	247	Engine
DNF	LMP2	18	(France) IDEC Sport	(United Kingdom) Jamie Chadwick (France) Mathys Jaubert (Germany) André Lotterer	Oreca 07	G	206	Lost wheel
DNF	LMP2	18	(France) IDEC Sport	(United Kingdom) Jamie Chadwick (France) Mathys Jaubert (Germany) André Lotterer	Gibson GK428 4.2 L V8	G	206	Lost wheel
DNF	LMGT3	54	(Italy) Vista AF Corse	(Italy) Francesco Castellacci (Switzerland) Thomas Flohr (Italy) Davide Rigon	Ferrari 296 GT3	G	192	Mechanical
DNF	LMGT3	54	(Italy) Vista AF Corse	(Italy) Francesco Castellacci (Switzerland) Thomas Flohr (Italy) Davide Rigon	Ferrari F163CE 3.0 L Turbo V6	G	192	Mechanical
DNF	Hypercar	101	(United States) Cadillac WTR	(Portugal) Filipe Albuquerque (United States) Jordan Taylor (United States) Ricky Taylor	Cadillac V-Series.R	M	189	Engine
DNF	Hypercar	101	(United States) Cadillac WTR	(Portugal) Filipe Albuquerque (United States) Jordan Taylor (United States) Ricky Taylor	Cadillac LMC55R 5.5 L V8	M	189	Engine
DNF	LMP2 (Pro-Am)	24	(United Kingdom) Nielsen Racing	(Turkey) Cem Bölükbaşı (United States) Colin Braun (United States) Naveen Rao	Oreca 07	G	170	Accident
DNF	LMP2 (Pro-Am)	24	(United Kingdom) Nielsen Racing	(Turkey) Cem Bölükbaşı (United States) Colin Braun (United States) Naveen Rao	Gibson GK428 4.2 L V8	G	170	Accident
DNF	LMGT3	31	(Belgium) The Bend Team WRT	Timur Boguslavskiy (Brazil) Augusto Farfus (Australia) Yasser Shahin	BMW M4 GT3 Evo	G	168	Collision damage
DNF	LMGT3	31	(Belgium) The Bend Team WRT	Timur Boguslavskiy (Brazil) Augusto Farfus (Australia) Yasser Shahin	BMW P58 3.0 L Turbo I6	G	168	Collision damage
DNF	LMGT3	46	(Belgium) Team WRT	(Oman) Ahmad Al Harthy (Italy) Valentino Rossi (South Africa) Kelvin van der Linde	BMW M4 GT3 Evo	G	156	Electrical
DNF	LMGT3	46	(Belgium) Team WRT	(Oman) Ahmad Al Harthy (Italy) Valentino Rossi (South Africa) Kelvin van der Linde	BMW P58 3.0 L Turbo I6	G	156	Electrical
DNF	LMGT3	95	(United Kingdom) United Autosports	(Indonesia) Sean Gelael (United Kingdom) Darren Leung (Japan) Marino Sato	McLaren 720S GT3 Evo	G	80	Drivetrain
DNF	LMGT3	95	(United Kingdom) United Autosports	(Indonesia) Sean Gelael (United Kingdom) Darren Leung (Japan) Marino Sato	McLaren M840T 4.0 L Turbo V8	G	80	Drivetrain
DNF	LMGT3	60	(Italy) Iron Lynx	(United Kingdom) Andrew Gilbert (United Kingdom) Lorcan Hanafin (Spain) Fran Rueda	Mercedes-AMG GT3 Evo	G	57	Engine
DNF	LMGT3	60	(Italy) Iron Lynx	(United Kingdom) Andrew Gilbert (United Kingdom) Lorcan Hanafin (Spain) Fran Rueda	Mercedes-AMG M159 6.2 L V8	G	57	Engine
DNF	LMGT3	88	(Germany) Proton Competition	(Italy) Stefano Gattuso (Italy) Giammarco Levorato (Norway) Dennis Olsen	Ford Mustang GT3	G	46	Accident
DNF	LMGT3	88	(Germany) Proton Competition	(Italy) Stefano Gattuso (Italy) Giammarco Levorato (Norway) Dennis Olsen	Ford Coyote 5.4 L V8	G	46	Accident
DSQ	Hypercar	50	(Italy) Ferrari AF Corse	(Italy) Antonio Fuoco (Spain) Miguel Molina (Denmark) Nicklas Nielsen	Ferrari 499P	M	387	Disqualified^{1}
DSQ	Hypercar	50	(Italy) Ferrari AF Corse	(Italy) Antonio Fuoco (Spain) Miguel Molina (Denmark) Nicklas Nielsen	Ferrari F163CG 3.0 L Turbo V6	M	387	Disqualified^{1}
Final classification

Tyre manufacturers
Key
Symbol	Tyre manufacturer
**G**	Goodyear
**M**	Michelin

- ^{1} The No. 50 Ferrari AF Corse entry was disqualified after failing post race technical inspection. The rear wing was found to have 52 mm (2.0 in) of deflection when tested post-race, while regulations only allowed a maximum of 15 mm (0.59 in) of deflection.

== Championship standings after the race ==
- Only the top five positions are included for all championship standings.

2025 Hypercar World Endurance Drivers' Championship
Pos	+/-	No.	Driver	Points
1		51	(United Kingdom) James Calado (Italy) Antonio Giovinazzi (Italy) Alessandro Pier Guidi	105
2	1	83	(United Kingdom) Phil Hanson (Poland) Robert Kubica (China) Yifei Ye	89
3	1	50	(Italy) Antonio Fuoco (Spain) Miguel Molina (Denmark) Nicklas Nielsen	57
4	6	7	(United Kingdom) Mike Conway (Japan) Kamui Kobayashi (Netherlands) Nyck de Vries	44
5	8	6	(France) Kévin Estre (Belgium) Laurens Vanthoor	42

2025 Hypercar World Endurance Manufacturers' Championship
Pos	+/-	Manufacturer	Points
1		(Italy) Ferrari	172
2		(Japan) Toyota	95
3	3	(Germany) Porsche	84
4	1	(United States) Cadillac	76
5	2	(Germany) BMW	64

2025 FIA World Cup for Hypercar Teams
Pos	+/-	No.	Team	Points
1		83	(Italy) AF Corse	138
2		99	(Germany) Proton Competition	81

2025 FIA Endurance Trophy for LMGT3 Drivers
Pos	+/-	No.	Drivers	Points
1	3	92	(United States) Ryan Hardwick (Austria) Richard Lietz (Italy) Riccardo Pera	81
2		21	(France) François Hériau (United States) Simon Mann (Italy) Alessio Rovera	76
3	2	33	(United Kingdom) Jonny Edgar (Spain) Daniel Juncadella (United States) Ben Keating	60
4	4	27	(Italy) Mattia Drudi (United Kingdom) Ian James (Canada) Zacharie Robichon	47
5	2	78	(Germany) Finn Gehrsitz (France) Arnold Robin	38

2025 FIA Endurance Trophy for LMGT3 Teams
Pos	+/-	No.	Team	Points
1	3	92	(Germany) Manthey 1st Phorm	81
2		21	(Italy) Vista AF Corse	76
3	2	33	(United Kingdom) TF Sport	60
4	4	27	(United States) Heart of Racing Team	47
5	2	78	(France) Akkodis ASP Team	38

== See also ==
- 2025 Road to Le Mans
- 2025 IMSA Ford Mustang Challenge

== Notes ==
FIA World Endurance Championship
Previous race: 6 Hours of Spa-Francorchamps	2025 season	Next race: 6 Hours of São Paulo
