= Dominic Harlow =

British engineer (born 1974)

- Born: 25 June 1974 (age 51); Hamburg, Germany
- Citizenship: British
- Occupation: Engineer
- Employer: FIA
- Title: Deputy Technical Director

Dominic Harlow (born 25 June 1974) is a British Formula One and motorsport engineer. He is currently the Deputy Technical Director for the FIA.

== Career ==
Harlow studied Mechanical Engineering at Imperial College London, graduating in 1995. He began his motorsports career in 1996 with Motor Sport Developments as a Design Engineer and Race Engineer, working across touring car and development programmes. He firstly worked as a design engineer on the Honda Super Touring project, before working as a race engineer the following year for Peugeot Sport again in Super Touring. In 1998, he joined Williams Racing as a Design Engineer and Race Engineer for their touring car programme, contributing to the Williams Renault Laguna Super Touring programme and supporting development work on the team's BMW Le Mans entry.

Harlow moved into Formula One in 2000 with Jordan Grand Prix, where he spent two years as a Test Engineer, before being promoted to an assistant race engineering role with Heinz-Harald Frentzen. He then worked as a Race Engineer for Ralph Firman in 2003, and for Giorgio Pantano and Timo Glock in 2004. In Jordan's final season, he was promoted to Chief Race Engineer, managing the team's trackside engineering operations, race strategy and reliability. He remained in this role as the team transitioned into Midland F1 Racing, Spyker F1 and later Force India.

Seeking a new challenge, Harlow returned to Williams for 2012 as a Senior Operations Engineer, heading up the remote garage at the factory during race weekends, and also having simulator based responsibilities. He left the team midway through the 2013 season and became a consulting engineer with BMW M Motorsport's DTM programme, engineering Marco Wittmann to both his championship titles in 2014 and 2016.

At the same time, Harlow began working with the FIA as Head of Technical Audit for Formula One, helping to ensure compliance with technical regulations and contributing to the development of future rule changes. He later took on the role on a full-time basis from 2017, and in 2024 was appointed Deputy Technical Director of the organisation, working alongside Nikolas Tombazis & Jan Monchaux.
