= BMW P66 =

BMW P66 (2012-2016) BMW P66/1 (2017-2018) BMW P66/3 (2022-present)

Overview
- Manufacturer: BMW Motorsport
- Production: 2012-present

Layout
- Configuration: V8 naturally aspirated, 90° cylinder angle (2012-2018); twin-turbocharged, 90° cylinder angle (2022-present)
- Displacement: 4.0 L (244 cu in)
- Cylinder bore: 93 mm (3.66 in)
- Piston stroke: 73.6 mm (2.90 in)
- Cylinder block material: Aluminum alloy
- Cylinder head material: Aluminum alloy
- Valvetrain: 32-valve (four valves per cylinder) DOHC

Combustion
- Turbocharger: Twin (2022-present)
- Fuel system: Electronic indirect multi-point fuel injection (2012-2018); 350 bar (5,076 psi) gasoline direct injection (2022-present)
- Management: Bosch Motronic MS 5.1
- Fuel type: Aral Ultimate 102 RON unleaded racing gasoline
- Oil system: Castrol EDGE Supercar 10W-60 fully synthetic lubricant, dry sump (2012-2014); Shell Helix Ultra Racing 10W-60 fully synthetic lubricant, dry sump (2015-2018)
- Cooling system: Single water pump

Output
- Power output: 480 hp (358 kW) (2012-2016) later over 500 hp (373 kW) (2017-2018) @ 7,500 rpm
- Torque output: Approx. 500 N⋅m (369 ft⋅lbf)

Dimensions
- Dry weight: 326 lb (148 kg) excluding headers, clutch, ECU, spark box or filters

Chronology
- Predecessor: BMW P65 (V8)
- Successor: BMW P48 Turbo (I-4t)

The BMW P66 Series is a prototype four-stroke 4.0-litre naturally aspirated V8 racing engine, developed and produced by BMW Motorsport in partnership with AC Schnitzer (reassembly, arrangement, preparation, maintenance, trackside support and tune-up) for Deutsche Tourenwagen Masters. BMW P66 Series was unveiled on 18 July 2011 alongside BMW M3 DTM (E92) machine at BMW Welt in Munich, Germany. The BMW P66 Series engine lifespan was only lasted seven years and later permanently retired in 2019 and later restored in 2022 in order to supply engines for BMW M Hybrid V8 LMDh machine.

== BMW P66 (2012-2016) ==
The BMW P66 engine generates approx. 480 bhp with the air restrictor specified in the technical regulations. BMW began development, design and construction of the NA V8 engine in November 2010. The first NA V8 engine was assembled in June 2011, with the first engine completed in late-August. Codenamed P66 it was intended to see its first race in the 2012 DTM season. It is made up of 800 different components, consisting of 3,900 individual parts. When designing the DTM drivetrain, BMW Motorsport took full advantage of the technological know-how within the BMW Group. The high-tech foundry connected to BMW Plant Landshut accounts for the large cast parts, such as the cylinder head and crankcase – just as it does in the production of the six-cylinder in-line engine for the BMW M4 Coupé. The cast parts are coated and given the necessary heat treatment within the appropriate departments in Munich. Only ten engines are permitted for all eight BMWs over the course of the entire season.

The engine's power is transferred via a sequential six-speed sport gearbox, which is operated pneumatically using shift paddles mounted on the steering wheel. The gearbox is one of the standard components, which are used by all the DTM manufacturers. It has 11 final drive ratios, which allow the engineers and drivers to react to the respective circuit and engine characteristics when setting the car up.

The BMW P66 engine was installed in BMW M3 DTM machines from 2012 to 2013 and later BMW M4 DTM in from 2014 to 2016. The BMW P66 engine captured 24 race wins, 26 pole positions, 18 fastest laps and 3 engine manufacturer titles.

=== Applications ===
- BMW M3 DTM (E92)
- BMW M4 DTM

== BMW P66/1 (2017-2018) ==
The BMW P66/1 engine was a subtle updated version of P66 engine to conform 2017 DTM engine regulations. The intake air restrictor was slightly increased from 28 to 29 mm (1.10 to 1.14 in) and also power increase from 480 to 500 hp (358 to 373 kW). The 2017 DTM engine regulations allow for enhancement in special intake-system areas special areas to optimise the engine's performance even more. Nonetheless, maximum longevity still represents a top priority of the DTM engines’ design. Blown engines are extremely rare in DTM and usually, the engines survive the entire season. During the course of the season, cost-intensive engine revisions aren't allowed in DTM as the sealed engines only may be subjected to services in this period of time, according to the regulations.

BMW P66/1 was proved less successful compared to previous P66 version that scored four wins, twelve pole positions and six fastest laps. BMW P66/1 was the last-ever BMW V8 naturally aspirated DTM engine to date.

=== Applications ===
- BMW M4 DTM

== BMW P66/3 (2022-present) ==
The BMW P66/3 engine is an updated direct injected twin-turbocharged version of the P66/1 engine to conform to 2023 LMDh engine regulations, with engine power set to 640 hp (477 kW).

=== Applications ===
- BMW M Hybrid V8
