= Chun-Ting Chou =

Taiwanese racing driver (born 2006)

Chun-Ting Chou 周雋庭
- Chou at Silverstone Circuit in 2026
- Nationality: (Taiwan) Taiwanese
- Born: 23 November 2006 (age 19) Taiwan

European Le Mans Series career
- Debut season: 2026
- Current team: Inter Europol Competition
- Categorisation: FIA Silver
- Car number: 13
- Starts: 6
- Wins: 1
- Podiums: 2
- Poles: 0
- Fastest laps: 0
- Best finish: 6th (LMP3) in 2026

Previous series
- 2025–26 2024–2025 2023–2024: Asian Le Mans Series; European Endurance Prototype Cup; Ligier European Series

Chinese name
- Traditional Chinese: 周雋庭
- Simplified Chinese: 周隽庭
Transcriptions
Standard Mandarin
- Hanyu Pinyin: Zhōu Jùntíng
Yue: Cantonese
- Jyutping: Zau1 Syun5 Ting4

Chun-Ting Chou (Chinese: 周雋庭; pinyin: Zhōu Jùntíng; Jyutping: Zau1 Syun5 Ting4; born 23 November 2006), also known as Jim Chou and Jimmy Chou, is a Taiwanese racing driver who last competed in the LMP3 class of the European Le Mans Series for Inter Europol Competition.

== Career ==
Chou made his competitive karting debut at the age of 10, competing until 2022. Racing primarily in Taiwan, Chou won the 2020 RMC Taiwan Junior title, as well as representing his home country in the 2022 FIA Motorsport Games' Karting Sprint Cup Senior discipline.

In 2023, Chou made his car racing debut, competing for Monza Garage in the JS P4 class of the Ligier European Series alongside Wang Ray Yu. The duo scored a best result of fifth at Aragón to take tenth in the JS P4 standings. At the end of the year, Chou raced in the 2023–24 Gulf Radical Cup, in which he took his maiden win in car racing at Dubai. For the rest of 2024, Chou returned to Monza Garage for another season in the Ligier European Series, this time alongside veteran James Winslow. In the six-round season, Chou achieved a best result of third at Barcelona and Le Castellet to move up to seventh in the final JS P4 standings. That year, Chou also made his European Endurance Prototype Cup debut at Mugello, driving a Nova NP02 for Graff Racing.

After finishing third in the Gulf Radical Cup Superprix in early 2025, Chou returned to Graff for the remainder of the year, as he embarked on his first full season in the European Endurance Prototype Cup with Alexandre Cougnaud and Loris Kyburz. Despite poles at Paul Ricard and Portimão, the trio could only settle for 43rd in the NP02 standings. That year, Chou also made his Le Mans Cup debut at the Algarve finale for 23Events Racing, in which he scored an LMP3 Pro-Am podium alongside Terrence Woodward. At the end of the year, Chou joined Inter Europol Competition to compete in the LMP3 class of the 2025–26 Asian Le Mans Series alongside Alexander Bukhantsov and Henry Cubides. After taking wins at Sepang and Dubai, Chou initially won the first Abu Dhabi race to take the lead in points, but was later disqualified on technical grounds and was forced to settle for second in the final standings.

Returning to Europe for the rest of 2026, Chou continued with Inter Europol to enter the European Le Mans Series alongside his AsLMS teammates. Starting off the season with a podium from the back of the grid at Barcelona, Chou became the first Taiwanese driver to win an ELMS race in the following round at Le Castellet. Following that, Chou took an additional podium at Silverstone en route to sixth in LMP3 standings. Towards the end of the year, Chou partook in the ELMS rookie tests with Inter Europol's LMP2 squad.

== Other ventures ==
Chou is an ambassador for Logitech G.

== Karting record ==
=== Karting career summary ===
Season	Series	Team	Position
2017	Rotax Max Challenge Taiwan – Micro		1st
2018	Taiwan Karting Championship – Micro		1st
2019	Taiwan Karting Championship – Junior Max		1st
2020	Rotax Max Challenge Taiwan – Junior		1st
2021	Rotax Max Challenge Taiwan – Senior		7th
2022	Rotax Max Challenge Taiwan – Senior		4th
2022	Taiwan Karting Championship – Senior Max		1st
2022	FIA Motorsport Games Karting Sprint Cup – Senior	Team Taiwan	11th

== Racing record ==
=== Racing career summary ===
Season	Series	Team	Races	Wins	Poles	F/Laps	Podiums	Points	Position
2022–23	Gulf Radical Cup		3	0	0	0	0	12	18th
2023	Ligier European Series – JS P4	Monza Garage	9	0	0	0	0	39	10th
2023–24	Gulf Radical Cup		20	1	0	1		194	4th
2024	Ligier European Series – JS P4	Monza Garage	11	0	0	0	2	66	7th
2024	Ultimate Cup Series European Endurance Prototype Cup – NP02	Graff Racing	1	0	0	0	0	4	43rd
2024–25	Gulf Radical Cup								
2025	European Endurance Prototype Cup	Graff Racing	6	0	2	0	0	4.5	43rd
2025	Le Mans Cup – LMP3 Pro-Am	23Events Racing	1	0	0	0	1	16	17th
2025–26	Asian Le Mans Series – LMP3	Inter Europol Competition	6	2	0	0	3	86	**2nd**
2026	European Le Mans Series – LMP3	Inter Europol Competition	6	1	0	0	2	58	6th

^{†} As Chou was a guest driver, he was ineligible to score points.

=== Complete Ligier European Series results ===
(key) (Races in bold indicate pole position; results in italics indicate fastest lap)

Year	Entrant	Class	Chassis	1	2	3	4	5	6	7	8	9	10	11	Rank	Points
2023	Monza Garage	JS P4	Ligier JS P4	CAT; 1 WD	CAT; 2 WD	LMS; 6	LEC; 1; 7	LEC; 2; 10	ARA; 1 Ret	ARA; 2; 5	SPA; 1 Ret	SPA; 2; 9	ALG; 1; 7	ALG; 2; 7	10th	39
2024	Monza Garage	JS P4	Ligier JS P4	CAT; 1; 3	CAT; 2 Ret	LEC; 1; 8	LEC; 2; 3	LMS; Ret	SPA; 1; 5	SPA; 2 Ret	MUG; 1; 5	MUG; 2 Ret	ALG; 1; 7	ALG; 2; 8	7th	66

=== Complete Le Mans Cup results ===
(key) (Races in bold indicate pole position; results in italics indicate fastest lap)

Year	Entrant	Class	Chassis	1	2	3	4	5	6	7	Rank	Points
2025	23Events Racing	LMP3 Pro-Am	Ligier JS P325	CAT	LEC	LMS; 1	LMS; 2	SPA	SIL	**ALG**; 3	17th	16

=== Complete Asian Le Mans Series results ===
(key) (Races in bold indicate pole position; results in italics indicate fastest lap)

Year	Entrant	Class	Chassis	Engine	1	2	3	4	5	6	Rank	Points
2025–26	Inter Europol Competition	LMP3	Ligier JS P325	Toyota V35A-FTS 3.5 L Twin-Turbo V6	SEP; 1; 1	SEP; 2; 4	DUB; 1; 1	DUB; 2; 7	ABU; 1 DSQ	ABU; 2; 2	2nd	86

=== Complete European Le Mans Series results ===
(key) (Races in bold indicate pole position; results in italics indicate fastest lap)

Year	Entrant	Class	Chassis	Engine	1	2	3	4	5	6	Rank	Points
2026	Inter Europol Competition	LMP3	Ligier JS P325	Toyota V35A-FTS 3.5 L Twin-Turbo V6	CAT; 3	LEC; 1	IMO; 10	SPA; Ret	SIL; 3	ALG; 9	6th	58

* Season still in progress.
