= 2022 Gulf 12 Hours =

2022 Gulf 12 Hours could refer to the following events:

- January 2022 Gulf 12 Hours
- December 2022 Gulf 12 Hours
