= Alexander Bukhantsov =

Russian racing driver (born 1987)

- Bukhantsov in 2023
- Nationality: (Russia) Russian
- Born: 19 February 1987 (age 39)
- Categorisation: FIA Bronze

Championship titles
- 2023–24 2022–23, 2023–24: Asian Le Mans Series – LMP3; Gulf Radical Cup

Alexander Bukhantsov (Russian: Александр Буханцов; born 19 February 1987) is an Emirati-based Russian racing driver who last competed in the LMP3 class of the European Le Mans Series for Inter Europol Competition.

== Career ==
Bukhantsov began his racing career in the 2021–22 UAE Procar Championship, whilst also finishing third in the 2021–22 Gulf Radical Cup standings. At the start of 2022, Bukhantsov finished third in the GT4 class at the Gulf 12 Hours for Century Motorsport, as well as making his LMP3 debut in round one of the Asian Le Mans Series at Dubai for Inter Europol Competition. For the rest of 2022, Bukhantsov joined DKR Engineering to compete in the Le Mans Cup and the European Le Mans Series, scoring two ELMS podiums at Barcelona and Spa to finish third in LMP3 points with Sebastián Álvarez. At the end of the year, Bukhantsov took nine wins on his return to the Gulf Radical Cup to clinch the 2022–23 title.

For the remainder of 2023, Bukhantsov returned to LMP3 competition, contesting the full Asian Le Mans Series with Inter Europol, before returning to DKR for another dual campaign in the Le Mans Cup and European Le Mans Series. He again found more success in ELMS, with a double podium at the Portimão finale bumping him up to sixth in points with Pedro Perino and James Winslow. At the end of the year, Bukhantsov and Winslow joined Cool Racing to race in the 2023–24 Asian Le Mans Series, winning at Sepang and Dubai and securing a clean sweep of podiums to clinch the LMP3 title. In parallel, Bukhantsov also returned to the Gulf Radical Cup, where he won eight times and secured his second consecutive title, earning him a test in LMP3 machinery with Team Virage.

In 2024, Bukhantsov reunited with Inter Europol for a dual campaign in the Le Mans Cup and European Le Mans Series. In LMC, he scored a win at the Barcelona opener with Rik Koen, whereas in ELMS, he took a lone podium at Mugello alongside Perino and Kai Askey. At the end of the year, Bukhantsov moved to Graff Racing for the 2024–25 Asian Le Mans Series, finishing a lowly tenth alongside Winslow and Danial Frost after podiums at Sepang and Abu Dhabi. Select appearances with HAAS RT in the Middle East Trophy and 23Events Racing in the European Endurance Prototype Cup followed, as Bukhantsov sat out LMP3 competition through most of 2025.

Bukhantsov returned to Inter Europol in the 2025–26 winter to race in the Asian Le Mans Series, driving the new Ligier JS P325 alongside Chun-Ting Chou and Henry Cubides. The trio won the Saturday races at Sepang, Dubai and Abu Dhabi to take the points lead, but were later disqualified from the latter on technical grounds and finished runner-up to the No. 17 CLX crew. Continuing with Inter Europol through 2026, Bukhantsov ran a dual campaign in the Le Mans Cup and European Le Mans Series. In LMC, Bukhantsov raced in the LMP3 Pro-Am class alongside a revolving door of drivers, qualifying on pole in all but one race and ending the season fifth in points with a pair of podiums to his name. In ELMS, Bukhantsov took his maiden series win at Le Castellet and two other podiums to finish sixth in points alongside Chou and Cubides.

== Racing record ==
=== Racing career summary ===
Season	Series	Team	Races	Wins	Poles	F/Laps	Podiums	Points	Position
2021–22	UAE Procar Championship								
2021–22	Gulf Radical Cup		20	3	2	3		251	**3rd**
2022	Gulf 12 Hours (January) – GT4	Century Motorsport	1	0	0	0	1	—N/a	**3rd**
2022	Asian Le Mans Series – LMP3	Inter Europol Competition	2	0	0	0	0	20	8th
2022	Le Mans Cup – LMP3	DKR Engineering	7	0	0	0	0	15	17th
2022	European Le Mans Series – LMP3	DKR Engineering	6	0	0	0	2	60	**3rd**
2022–23	Gulf Radical Cup		21	9	13	7		356	**1st**
2023	Asian Le Mans Series – LMP3	Inter Europol Competition	4	0	0	0	0	27	7th
2023	Le Mans Cup – LMP3	DKR Engineering	7	0	0	0	0	18	13th
2023	European Le Mans Series – LMP3	DKR Engineering	6	0	0	0	2	51	6th
2023–24	Asian Le Mans Series – LMP3	Cool Racing	5	2	3	0	5	104	**1st**
2023–24	Gulf Radical Cup	TT Racing	21	8	11	8		306	**1st**
2024	Le Mans Cup – LMP3	Inter Europol Competition	7	0	0	0	1	21	12th
2024	European Le Mans Series – LMP3	Inter Europol Competition	6	0	0	0	1	27	12th
2024	European Endurance Prototype Cup – LMP3	Inter Europol Competition	3	0	1	0	2	45	10th
2024–25	Asian Le Mans Series – LMP3	Graff Racing	6	0	0	0	2	50	10th
2024–25	Gulf Radical Cup		6	1	0	0	3	53	10th
2025	Middle East Trophy – GT3	HAAS RT	2	0	0	0	0	16	8th
2025	European Endurance Prototype Cup	23Events Racing	2	0	0	0	0	10.5	30th
2025–26	Asian Le Mans Series – LMP3	Inter Europol Competition	6	2	0	0	3	86	**2nd**
2025–26	24H Series Middle East – GT3 Am	Continental Racing with Simpson Motorsport	1	0	0	0	1	66	4th
2025–26	24H Series Middle East – GT3 Am	HAAS RT	2	0	0	0	0	66	4th
2025–26	Gulf Radical Cup		11	2	2			466	7th
2026	Le Mans Cup – LMP3 Pro-Am	Inter Europol Competition	6	0	5	0	2	63	5th
2026	European Le Mans Series – LMP3	Inter Europol Competition	6	1	0	0	2	58	6th
2026–27	Gulf Radical Cup		3	2	3		3	170*	**1st***

=== Complete Asian Le Mans Series results ===
(key) (Races in bold indicate pole position; results in italics indicate fastest lap)

Year	Entrant	Class	Chassis	Engine	1	2	3	4	5	6	Rank	Points
2022	Inter Europol Competition	LMP3	Ligier JS P320	Nissan VK50VE 5.0 L V8	DUB; 1; 5	DUB; 2; 5	ABU; 1	ABU; 2			8th	20
2023	Inter Europol Competition	LMP3	Ligier JS P320	Nissan VK56DE 5.6L V8	DUB; 1; 5	DUB; 2; 7	ABU; 1; 10	ABU; 2; 5			7th	27
2023–24	Cool Racing	LMP3	Ligier JS P320	Nissan VK56DE 5.6 L V8	SEP; 1; 1	SEP; 2; 3	**DUB**; 1	**ABU**; **1**; 2	**ABU**; **2**; 2		1st	104
2024–25	Graff Racing	LMP3	Ligier JS P320	Nissan VK56DE 5.6 L V8	SEP; 1; 3	SEP; 2 Ret	DUB; 1; 6	DUB; 2; 4	ABU; 1; 3	ABU; 2 Ret	10th	50
2025–26	Inter Europol Competition	LMP3	Ligier JS P325	Toyota V35A-FTS 3.5 L Twin-Turbo V6	SEP; 1; 1	SEP; 2; 4	DUB; 1; 1	DUB; 2; 7	ABU; 1 DSQ	ABU; 2; 2	2nd	86

=== Complete Le Mans Cup results ===
(key) (Races in bold indicate pole position; results in italics indicate fastest lap)

Year	Entrant	Class	Chassis	1	2	3	4	5	6	7	Rank	Points
2022	DKR Engineering	LMP3	Duqueine M30 - D-08	LEC; 20	IMO; 11	LMS; 1; 8	LMS; 2; 7	MNZ; Ret	SPA; 8	ALG; 8	17th	15
2023	DKR Engineering	LMP3	Duqueine M30 - D-08	CAT; 9	LMS; 1 Ret	LMS; 2; 29	LEC; 4	ARA; Ret	SPA; 8	ALG; 26†	13th	18
2024	Inter Europol Competition	LMP3	Ligier JS P320	CAT; 3	LEC; 8	LMS; 1 Ret	LMS; 2; 11	SPA; Ret	MUG; 9	ALG; 16	11th	21
2026	Inter Europol Competition	LMP3 Pro-Am	Ligier JS P325	**CAT**; 5	**LEC**; 4	LMS; DSQ	**SPA**; 3	**SIL**; 7	**ALG**; 3		5th	63

=== Complete European Le Mans Series results ===
(key) (Races in bold indicate pole position; results in italics indicate fastest lap)

Year	Entrant	Class	Chassis	Engine	1	2	3	4	5	6	Rank	Points
2022	DKR Engineering	LMP3	Duqueine M30 - D08	Nissan VK56DE 5.6 L V8	LEC; 9	IMO; 5	MNZ; 8	CAT; 2	SPA; 2	ALG; 6	3rd	60
2023	DKR Engineering	LMP3	Duqueine M30 - D08	Nissan VK56DE 5.6L V8	CAT; 10	LEC; 5	ARA; 8	SPA; 7	PRT; 3	ALG; 3	6th	51
2024	Inter Europol Competition	LMP3	Ligier JS P320	Nissan VK56DE 5.6L V8	CAT; 6	LEC; Ret	IMO; 9	SPA; 9	MUG; 3	ALG; Ret	12th	27
2026	Inter Europol Competition	LMP3	Ligier JS P325	Toyota V35A-FTS 3.5 L Twin-Turbo V6	CAT; 3	LEC; 1	IMO; 10	SPA; Ret	SIL; 3	ALG; 9	6th	58
