= 2024 European Le Mans Series =

European racing season

The 2024 European Le Mans Series was the twenty-first season of the Automobile Club de l'Ouest's (ACO) European Le Mans Series. The six-event season began at Circuit de Barcelona-Catalunya on 14 April and concluded at Algarve International Circuit on 19 October.

The series was open to Le Mans Prototypes, divided into the LMP2 and LMP3 classes, and grand tourer-style racing cars in the new LMGT3 class. The season was the first for the LMGT3 class, replacing LMGTE.

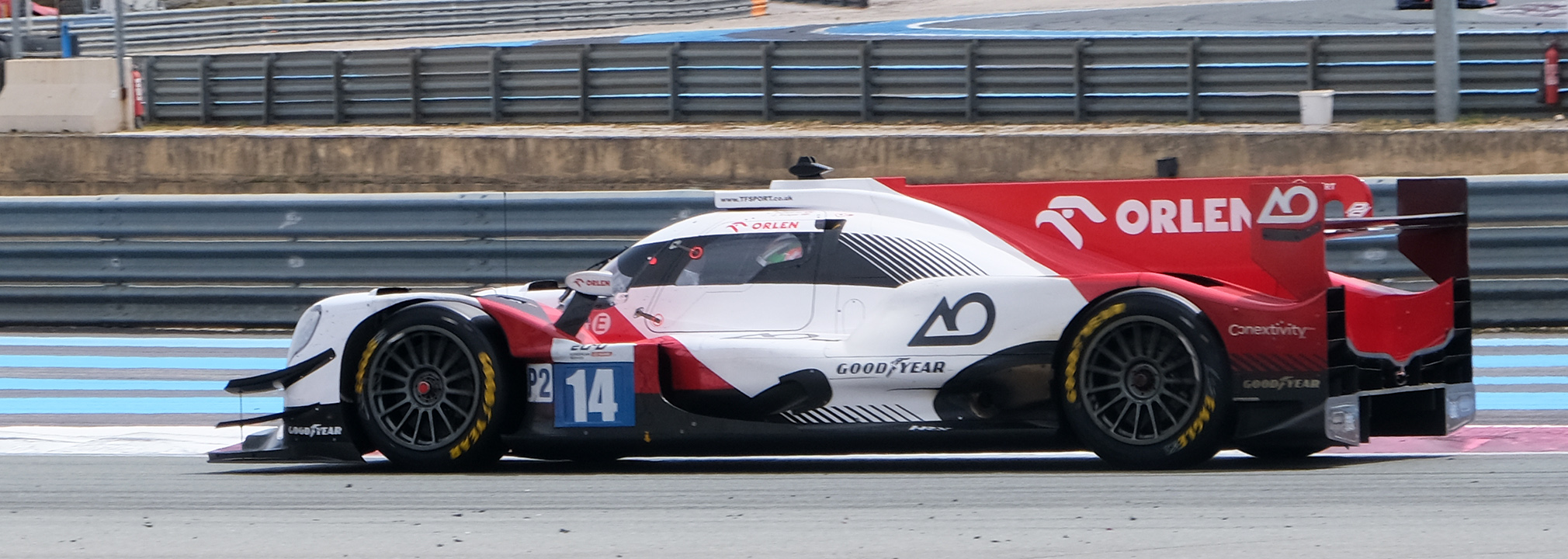
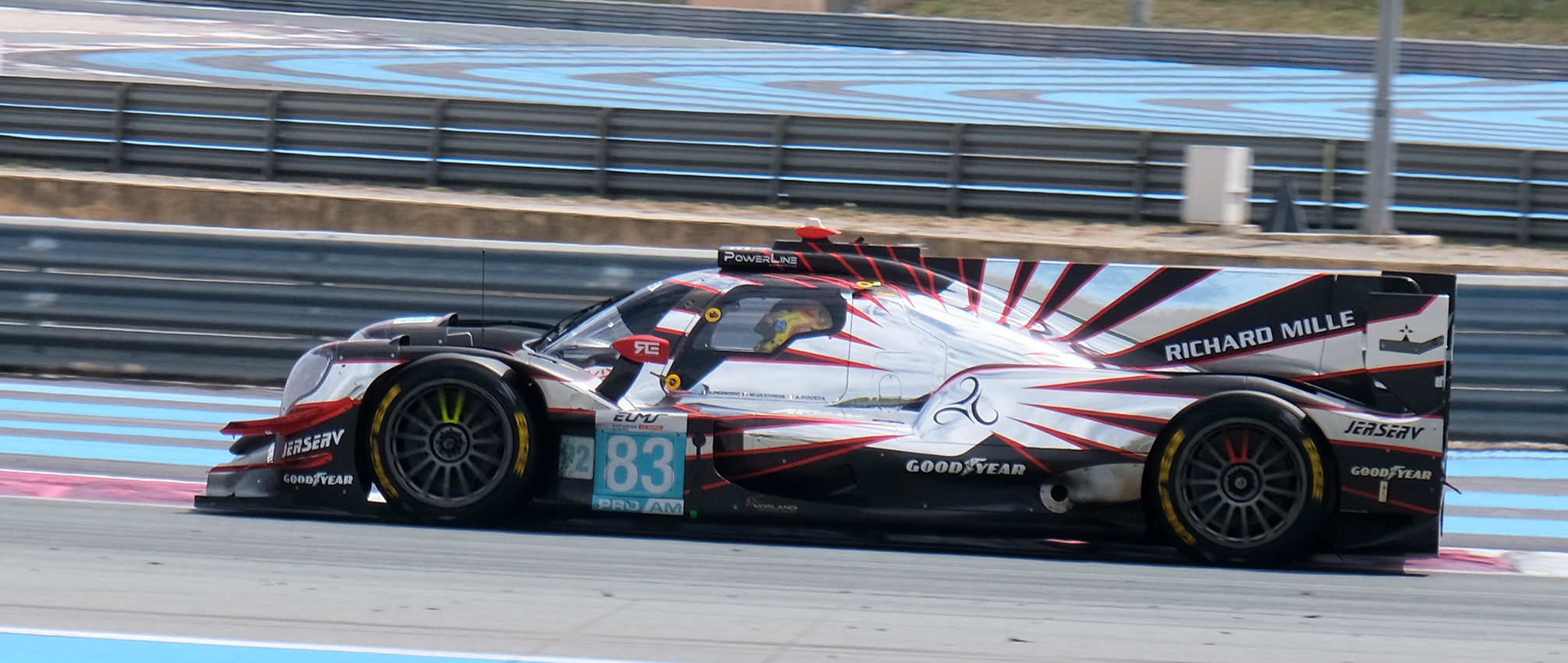
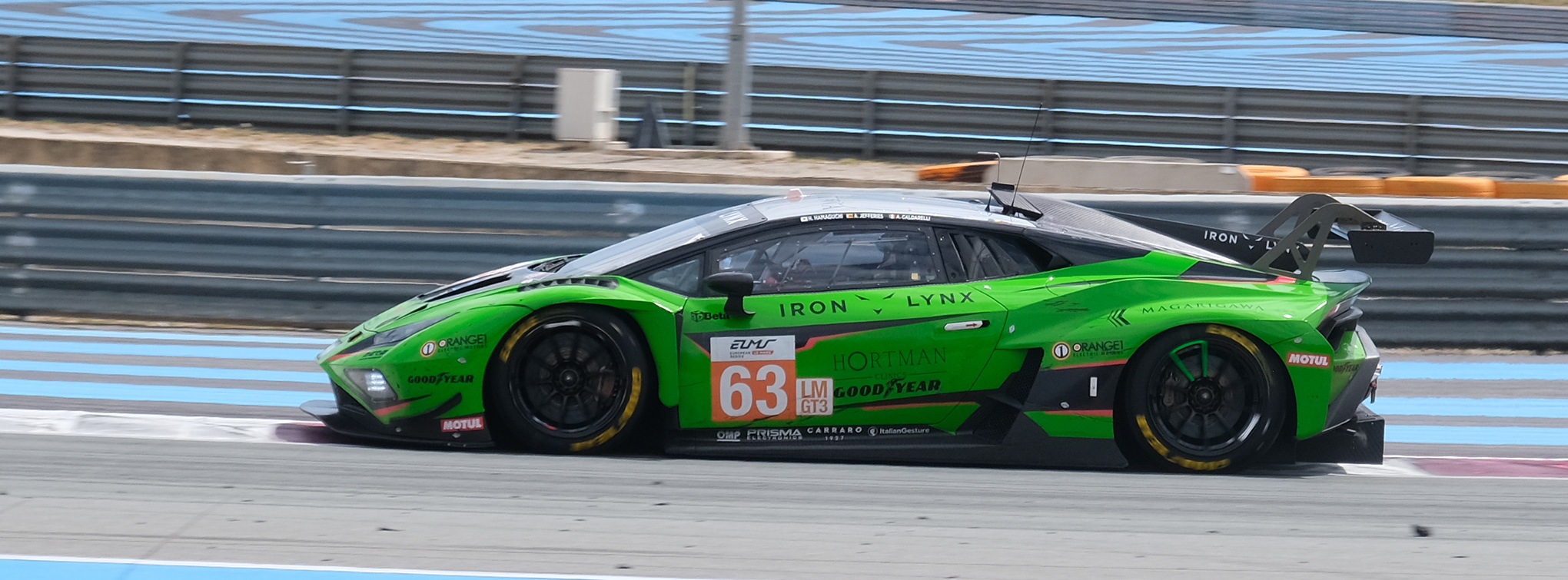
The No. 14 car and the AO by TF team are the LMP2 Drivers' and Teams champions. The No. 83 car and the AF Corse team is the LMP2 Pro/Am Drivers and Teams champions. The No. 63 Iron Lynx drivers are the LMGT3 Drivers' champions. Not pictured: The No. 15 RLR MSport car as the LMP3 Drivers' and Teams champions.

== Calendar ==
The provisional calendar for the 2024 season was announced on 12 September 2023. Mugello Circuit was added to the calendar for the first time, replacing the round at MotorLand Aragón, and the Imola Circuit round returned after being cancelled the previous year.

Locations of the 2024 races

Rnd	Race	Circuit	Location	Date
1	4 Hours of Barcelona	(Spain) Circuit de Barcelona-Catalunya	Montmeló, Spain	14 April
2	4 Hours of Le Castellet	(France) Circuit Paul Ricard	Le Castellet, France	5 May
3	4 Hours of Imola	(Italy) Imola Circuit	Imola, Italy	7 July
4	4 Hours of Spa-Francorchamps	(Belgium) Circuit de Spa-Francorchamps	Stavelot, Belgium	25 August
5	4 Hours of Mugello	(Italy) Mugello Circuit	Scarperia e San Piero, Italy	29 September
6	4 Hours of Portimão	(Portugal) Algarve International Circuit	Portimão, Portugal	19 October

== Entries ==
=== LMP2 ===
All cars in the LMP2 class use the Gibson GK428 V8 engine and Goodyear tyres. Entries in the LMP2 Pro-Am class, set aside for teams with a Bronze-rated driver in their line-up, are denoted with icons.

Entrant/Team	Chassis	No.	MISC	Drivers	Rounds
(Luxembourg) DKR Engineering	Oreca 07	3	PA	(Turkey) Cem Bölükbaşı	All
(Luxembourg) DKR Engineering	Oreca 07	3	PA	(Germany) Laurents Hörr	All
(Luxembourg) DKR Engineering	Oreca 07	3	PA	(Australia) Andres Latorre Canon	All
(Italy) Iron Lynx – Proton	Oreca 07	9	P2	(Italy) Matteo Cairoli	All
(Italy) Iron Lynx – Proton	Oreca 07	9	P2	(France) Macéo Capietto	All
(Italy) Iron Lynx – Proton	Oreca 07	9	P2	(Germany) Jonas Ried	All
(Germany) Proton Competition	Oreca 07	77	PA	(Austria) René Binder	All
(Germany) Proton Competition	Oreca 07	77	PA	(Italy) Giorgio Roda	All
(Germany) Proton Competition	Oreca 07	77	PA	(Netherlands) Bent Viscaal	All
(United Kingdom) Vector Sport	Oreca 07	10	P2	(Republic of Ireland) Ryan Cullen	All
(United Kingdom) Vector Sport	Oreca 07	10	P2	(Monaco) Stéphane Richelmi	All
(United Kingdom) Vector Sport	Oreca 07	10	P2	(Brazil) Felipe Drugovich	1–4, 6
(United Kingdom) Vector Sport	Oreca 07	10	P2	(France) Patrick Pilet	5
(United States) AO by TF	Oreca 07	14	P2	(Switzerland) Louis Delétraz	All
(United States) AO by TF	Oreca 07	14	P2	(United Kingdom) Jonny Edgar	All
(United States) AO by TF	Oreca 07	14	P2	(Poland) Robert Kubica	All
(Poland) Team Virage	Oreca 07	19	PA	(United Kingdom) Anthony Wells	1–4
(Poland) Team Virage	Oreca 07	19	PA	(United Kingdom) Matt Bell	1–3
(Poland) Team Virage	Oreca 07	19	PA	(Brazil) Nelson Piquet Jr.	1–3
(Poland) Team Virage	Oreca 07	19	PA	(France) Tristan Vautier	4–6
(Poland) Team Virage	Oreca 07	19	PA	(United Kingdom) Wayne Boyd	4
(Poland) Team Virage	Oreca 07	19	PA	(Greece) Georgios Kolovos	5–6
(Poland) Team Virage	Oreca 07	19	PA	(France) Raphaël Narac	5–6
(Portugal) Algarve Pro Racing	Oreca 07	20	PA	(United Kingdom) Richard Bradley	All
(Portugal) Algarve Pro Racing	Oreca 07	20	PA	(Greece) Kriton Lendoudis	All
(Portugal) Algarve Pro Racing	Oreca 07	20	PA	(United Kingdom) Alex Quinn	All
(Portugal) Algarve Pro Racing	Oreca 07	25	P2	(United Kingdom) Olli Caldwell	All
(Portugal) Algarve Pro Racing	Oreca 07	25	P2	(Liechtenstein) Matthias Kaiser	All
(Portugal) Algarve Pro Racing	Oreca 07	25	P2	(United Kingdom) Alex Lynn	All
(United Kingdom) United Autosports	Oreca 07	21	PA	(United Kingdom) Andy Meyrick	All
(United Kingdom) United Autosports	Oreca 07	21	PA	(Brazil) Daniel Schneider	All
(United Kingdom) United Autosports	Oreca 07	21	PA	(United Kingdom) Oliver Jarvis	1–3, 5–6
(United Kingdom) United Autosports	Oreca 07	21	PA	(Portugal) Filipe Albuquerque	4
(United Kingdom) United Autosports	Oreca 07	22	P2	(United Kingdom) Ben Hanley	All
(United Kingdom) United Autosports	Oreca 07	22	P2	(Japan) Marino Sato	All
(United Kingdom) United Autosports	Oreca 07	22	P2	(Romania) Filip Ugran	All
(United Kingdom) United Autosports	Oreca 07	23	P2	(United Kingdom) Paul di Resta	All
(United Kingdom) United Autosports	Oreca 07	23	P2	(United States) Bijoy Garg	All
(United Kingdom) United Autosports	Oreca 07	23	P2	(Switzerland) Fabio Scherer	All
(United Kingdom) Nielsen Racing	Oreca 07	24	PA	(United States) John Falb	All
(United Kingdom) Nielsen Racing	Oreca 07	24	PA	(United Kingdom) Colin Noble	All
(United Kingdom) Nielsen Racing	Oreca 07	24	PA	(Spain) Albert Costa	1–3
(United Kingdom) Nielsen Racing	Oreca 07	24	PA	(United Kingdom) Nick Yelloly	4–6
(United Kingdom) Nielsen Racing	Oreca 07	27	P2	(United Kingdom) Will Stevens	All
(United Kingdom) Nielsen Racing	Oreca 07	27	P2	(Denmark) David Heinemeier Hansson	1–4
(United Kingdom) Nielsen Racing	Oreca 07	27	P2	(Chile) Nico Pino	1–3
(United Kingdom) Nielsen Racing	Oreca 07	27	P2	(Denmark) Benjamin Pedersen	4–6
(United Kingdom) Nielsen Racing	Oreca 07	27	P2	(France) Gabriel Aubry	6
(France) IDEC Sport	Oreca 07	28	P2	(France) Reshad de Gerus	All
(France) IDEC Sport	Oreca 07	28	P2	(Netherlands) Job van Uitert	All
(France) IDEC Sport	Oreca 07	28	P2	(France) Paul Lafargue	1–2
(France) IDEC Sport	Oreca 07	28	P2	(Argentina) Marcos Siebert	3–4
(France) IDEC Sport	Oreca 07	28	P2	(Chile) Nico Pino	5–6
(France) Richard Mille by TDS	Oreca 07	29	PA	(Switzerland) Mathias Beche	All
(France) Richard Mille by TDS	Oreca 07	29	PA	(United States) Rodrigo Sales	All
(France) Richard Mille by TDS	Oreca 07	29	PA	(Switzerland) Grégoire Saucy	All
(France) Panis Racing	Oreca 07	65	P2	(Monaco) Arthur Leclerc	All
(France) Panis Racing	Oreca 07	65	P2	(Venezuela) Manuel Maldonado	All
(France) Panis Racing	Oreca 07	65	P2	(France) Charles Milesi	All
(France) Duqueine Team	Oreca 07	30	P2	(Australia) James Allen	All
(France) Duqueine Team	Oreca 07	30	P2	(France) Jean-Baptiste Simmenauer	All
(France) Duqueine Team	Oreca 07	30	P2	(Netherlands) Niels Koolen	1–3, 5–6
(France) Duqueine Team	Oreca 07	30	P2	(Sweden) Rasmus Lindh	4
(Poland) Inter Europol Competition	Oreca 07	34	P2	(Italy) Luca Ghiotto	All
(Poland) Inter Europol Competition	Oreca 07	34	P2	(United Kingdom) Oliver Gray	All
(Poland) Inter Europol Competition	Oreca 07	34	P2	(France) Clément Novalak	All
(Poland) Inter Europol Competition	Oreca 07	43	P2	(Mexico) Sebastián Álvarez	All
(Poland) Inter Europol Competition	Oreca 07	43	P2	(France) Tom Dillmann	All
(Poland) Inter Europol Competition	Oreca 07	43	P2	(France) Vladislav Lomko (Note: Lomko and Bukhantsov are Russian, but they compete under a French licence and an Emirati licence respectively as Russian national emblems were banned by the FIA following the Russian invasion of Ukraine.)	All
(Switzerland) Cool Racing	Oreca 07	37	P2	(Spain) Lorenzo Fluxá	All
(Switzerland) Cool Racing	Oreca 07	37	P2	(Denmark) Malthe Jakobsen	All
(Switzerland) Cool Racing	Oreca 07	37	P2	(Japan) Ritomo Miyata	1–2, 4–6
(Switzerland) Cool Racing	Oreca 07	37	P2	(France) Paul-Loup Chatin	3
(Switzerland) Cool Racing	Oreca 07	47	P2	(France) Paul-Loup Chatin	1–2
(Switzerland) Cool Racing	Oreca 07	47	P2	(Denmark) Frederik Vesti	All
(Switzerland) Cool Racing	Oreca 07	47	P2	(Mexico) Alex García	1–2
(Switzerland) Cool Racing	Oreca 07	47	P2	(Thailand) Carl Bennett	3–6
(Switzerland) Cool Racing	Oreca 07	47	P2	(Austria) Ferdinand Habsburg	3–6
(Italy) AF Corse	Oreca 07	83	PA	(France) François Perrodo	All
(Italy) AF Corse	Oreca 07	83	PA	(Italy) Alessio Rovera	All
(Italy) AF Corse	Oreca 07	83	PA	(France) Matthieu Vaxivière	All

Icon	MISC
P2	LMP2
PA	LMP2 Pro-Am

- Filipe Albuquerque was scheduled to compete for United Autosports, but withdrew prior to the start of the season.
- Gabriel Aubry was scheduled to compete for Vector Sport, but withdrew prior to the start of the season.
- Rob Hodes and Ian Rodríguez were scheduled to compete for Team Virage, but withdrew prior to the start of the season.
- Tom van Rompuy was scheduled to compete for DKR Engineering, but withdrew prior to the start of the season.
- Carl Bennett was scheduled to compete for Duqueine Team, but departed to take up his Hypercar opportunity at the Duqueine-run Isotta Fraschini squad in the FIA World Endurance Championship. He was replaced by Niels Koolen. Bennett later rejoined the ELMS with Cool Racing, taking Alex García's seat after two rounds.

=== LMP3 ===
All cars in the LMP3 class use the Nissan VK56DE 5.6L V8 engine and Michelin tyres.

Entrant/Team	Chassis	No.	Drivers	Rounds
(Luxembourg) DKR Engineering	Duqueine M30 - D08	4	(United States) Wyatt Brichacek	All
(Luxembourg) DKR Engineering	Duqueine M30 - D08	4	(Germany) Alexander Mattschull	All
(Luxembourg) DKR Engineering	Duqueine M30 - D08	4	(Spain) Belén García	1–4
(Luxembourg) DKR Engineering	Duqueine M30 - D08	4	(Portugal) Guilherme Oliveira	5–6
(United Kingdom) RLR MSport	Ligier JS P320	5	(Canada) Daniel Ali	All
(United Kingdom) RLR MSport	Ligier JS P320	5	(Canada) James Dayson	All
(United Kingdom) RLR MSport	Ligier JS P320	5	(United Kingdom) Bailey Voisin	All
(United Kingdom) RLR MSport	Ligier JS P320	15	(United Kingdom) Nick Adcock	All
(United Kingdom) RLR MSport	Ligier JS P320	15	(Denmark) Michael Jensen	All
(United Kingdom) RLR MSport	Ligier JS P320	15	(France) Gaël Julien	All
(Poland) Team Virage	Ligier JS P320	8	(Algeria) Julien Gerbi	All
(Poland) Team Virage	Ligier JS P320	8	(France) Gillian Henrion	All
(Poland) Team Virage	Ligier JS P320	8	(Portugal) Bernardo Pinheiro	All
(Italy) EuroInternational	Ligier JS P320	11	(Canada) Adam Ali	All
(Italy) EuroInternational	Ligier JS P320	11	(United Kingdom) Matthew Richard Bell	All
(Germany) WTM by Rinaldi Racing	Duqueine M30 - D08	12	(Germany) Torsten Kratz	All
(Germany) WTM by Rinaldi Racing	Duqueine M30 - D08	12	(Colombia) Óscar Tunjo	All
(Germany) WTM by Rinaldi Racing	Duqueine M30 - D08	12	(Germany) Leonard Weiss	All
(Switzerland) Cool Racing	Ligier JS P320	17	(Portugal) Miguel Cristóvão	All
(Switzerland) Cool Racing	Ligier JS P320	17	(Portugal) Manuel Espírito Santo	All
(Switzerland) Cool Racing	Ligier JS P320	17	(Switzerland) Cédric Oltramare	1–5
(Switzerland) Racing Spirit of Léman	Ligier JS P320	31	(France) Antoine Doquin	All
(Switzerland) Racing Spirit of Léman	Ligier JS P320	31	(France) Jean-Ludovic Foubert	All
(Switzerland) Racing Spirit of Léman	Ligier JS P320	31	(France) Jacques Wolff	All
(France) Ultimate	Ligier JS P320	35	(France) Jean-Baptiste Lahaye	All
(France) Ultimate	Ligier JS P320	35	(France) Matthieu Lahaye	All
(France) Ultimate	Ligier JS P320	35	(France) Alexandre Yvon	1
(France) Ultimate	Ligier JS P320	35	(France) Eric Trouillet	2
(France) Ultimate	Ligier JS P320	35	(France) Paul Lanchère	3
(France) Ultimate	Ligier JS P320	35	(France) Louis Rossi	4
(France) Ultimate	Ligier JS P320	35	(France) Louis Stern	5
(France) Ultimate	Ligier JS P320	35	(France) François Hériau	6
(Poland) Inter Europol Competition	Ligier JS P320	88	(United Kingdom) Kai Askey	All
(Poland) Inter Europol Competition	Ligier JS P320	88	(United Arab Emirates) Alexander Bukhantsov	All
(Poland) Inter Europol Competition	Ligier JS P320	88	(Mozambique) Pedro Perino	All

- Horst Felbermayr Jr. was scheduled to compete for RLR MSport, but withdrew prior to the start of the season.

=== LMGT3 ===
All cars in the LMGT3 class use Goodyear tyres.

Entrant/Team	Chassis	Engine	No.	Drivers	Rounds
(Denmark) Formula Racing	Ferrari 296 GT3	Ferrari F163 3.0 L Turbo V6	50	(Denmark) Conrad Laursen	All
(Denmark) Formula Racing	Ferrari 296 GT3	Ferrari F163 3.0 L Turbo V6	50	(Denmark) Johnny Laursen	All
(Denmark) Formula Racing	Ferrari 296 GT3	Ferrari F163 3.0 L Turbo V6	50	(Denmark) Nicklas Nielsen	1–5
(Italy) AF Corse	Ferrari 296 GT3	Ferrari F163 3.0 L Turbo V6	51	(France) Emmanuel Collard	All
(Italy) AF Corse	Ferrari 296 GT3	Ferrari F163 3.0 L Turbo V6	51	(France) Charles-Henri Samani	All
(Italy) AF Corse	Ferrari 296 GT3	Ferrari F163 3.0 L Turbo V6	51	(Belgium) Ulysse de Pauw	1
(Italy) AF Corse	Ferrari 296 GT3	Ferrari F163 3.0 L Turbo V6	51	(Argentina) Nicolás Varrone	2–6
(Switzerland) Spirit of Race	Ferrari 296 GT3	Ferrari F163 3.0 L Turbo V6	55	(United Kingdom) Duncan Cameron	All
(Switzerland) Spirit of Race	Ferrari 296 GT3	Ferrari F163 3.0 L Turbo V6	55	(Republic of Ireland) Matt Griffin	All
(Switzerland) Spirit of Race	Ferrari 296 GT3	Ferrari F163 3.0 L Turbo V6	55	(South Africa) David Perel	All
(Switzerland) Kessel Racing	Ferrari 296 GT3	Ferrari F163 3.0 L Turbo V6	57	(Japan) Takeshi Kimura	All
(Switzerland) Kessel Racing	Ferrari 296 GT3	Ferrari F163 3.0 L Turbo V6	57	(France) Esteban Masson	All
(Switzerland) Kessel Racing	Ferrari 296 GT3	Ferrari F163 3.0 L Turbo V6	57	(Brazil) Daniel Serra	All
(Switzerland) Racing Spirit of Léman	Aston Martin Vantage AMR GT3 Evo	Aston Martin M177 4.0 L Turbo V8	59	(United States) Derek DeBoer	All
(Switzerland) Racing Spirit of Léman	Aston Martin Vantage AMR GT3 Evo	Aston Martin M177 4.0 L Turbo V8	59	(France) Valentin Hasse-Clot	All
(Switzerland) Racing Spirit of Léman	Aston Martin Vantage AMR GT3 Evo	Aston Martin M177 4.0 L Turbo V8	59	(United Kingdom) Casper Stevenson	All
(Germany) Proton Competition	Porsche 911 GT3 R (992)	Porsche M97/80 4.2 L Flat-6	60	(France) Julien Andlauer	All
(Germany) Proton Competition	Porsche 911 GT3 R (992)	Porsche M97/80 4.2 L Flat-6	60	(Italy) Matteo Cressoni	All
(Germany) Proton Competition	Porsche 911 GT3 R (992)	Porsche M97/80 4.2 L Flat-6	60	(Italy) Claudio Schiavoni	All
(Italy) Iron Dames	Porsche 911 GT3 R (992)	Porsche M97/80 4.2 L Flat-6	85	(Belgium) Sarah Bovy	All
(Italy) Iron Dames	Porsche 911 GT3 R (992)	Porsche M97/80 4.2 L Flat-6	85	(Switzerland) Rahel Frey	All
(Italy) Iron Dames	Porsche 911 GT3 R (992)	Porsche M97/80 4.2 L Flat-6	85	(Denmark) Michelle Gatting	All
(Italy) Iron Lynx	Lamborghini Huracán GT3 Evo 2	Lamborghini DGF 5.2 L V10	63	(Italy) Andrea Caldarelli	All
(Italy) Iron Lynx	Lamborghini Huracán GT3 Evo 2	Lamborghini DGF 5.2 L V10	63	(Japan) Hiroshi Hamaguchi	All
(Italy) Iron Lynx	Lamborghini Huracán GT3 Evo 2	Lamborghini DGF 5.2 L V10	63	(Zimbabwe) Axcil Jefferies	All
(United Kingdom) JMW Motorsport	Ferrari 296 GT3	Ferrari F163 3.0 L Turbo V6	66	(United Kingdom) Ben Tuck	All
(United Kingdom) JMW Motorsport	Ferrari 296 GT3	Ferrari F163 3.0 L Turbo V6	66	(United Kingdom) John Hartshorne	1–4
(United Kingdom) JMW Motorsport	Ferrari 296 GT3	Ferrari F163 3.0 L Turbo V6	66	(United Kingdom) Phil Keen	1–4
(United Kingdom) JMW Motorsport	Ferrari 296 GT3	Ferrari F163 3.0 L Turbo V6	66	(United States) Jason Hart	5–6
(United Kingdom) JMW Motorsport	Ferrari 296 GT3	Ferrari F163 3.0 L Turbo V6	66	(United States) Scott Noble	5–6
(United Kingdom) GR Racing	Ferrari 296 GT3	Ferrari F163 3.0 L Turbo V6	86	(Italy) Riccardo Pera	All
(United Kingdom) GR Racing	Ferrari 296 GT3	Ferrari F163 3.0 L Turbo V6	86	(Italy) Davide Rigon	All
(United Kingdom) GR Racing	Ferrari 296 GT3	Ferrari F163 3.0 L Turbo V6	86	(United Kingdom) Michael Wainwright	All
(United Kingdom) Grid Motorsport by TF	Aston Martin Vantage AMR GT3 Evo	Aston Martin M177 4.0 L Turbo V8	97	(United Kingdom) Jonathan Adam	All
(United Kingdom) Grid Motorsport by TF	Aston Martin Vantage AMR GT3 Evo	Aston Martin M177 4.0 L Turbo V8	97	(Australia) Martin Berry	All
(United Kingdom) Grid Motorsport by TF	Aston Martin Vantage AMR GT3 Evo	Aston Martin M177 4.0 L Turbo V8	97	(United Kingdom) Lorcan Hanafin	All

- Jeff Segal was scheduled to compete for JMW Motorsport, but withdrew prior to the start of the season.

== Results and standings ==
=== Race results ===
Bold indicates overall winner.

Rnd.	Circuit	Pole	LMP2 Winning Team	LMP2 Pro-Am Winning Team	LMP3 Winning Team	LMGT3 Winning Team	Results
Rnd.	Circuit	Pole	LMP2 Winning Drivers	LMP2 Pro-Am Winning Drivers	LMP3 Winning Drivers	LMGT3 Winning Drivers	Results
1	(Spain) Catalunya	(United Kingdom) No. 22 United Autosports	**(Switzerland) No. 37 COOL Racing**	(Italy) No. 83 AF Corse	(Poland) No. 8 Team Virage	(Denmark) No. 50 Formula Racing	Report
1	(Spain) Catalunya	(United Kingdom) **Ben Hanley** (Japan) Marino Sato (Romania) Filip Ugran	**(Spain) Lorenzo Fluxá (Denmark) Malthe Jakobsen (Japan) Ritomo Miyata**	(France) François Perrodo (Italy) Alessio Rovera (France) Matthieu Vaxivière	(Algeria) Julien Gerbi (France) Gillian Henrion (Portugal) Bernardo Pinheiro	(Denmark) Conrad Laursen (Denmark) Johnny Laursen (Denmark) Nicklas Nielsen	Report
2	(France) Le Castellet	(France) No. 28 IDEC Sport	**(Poland) No. 43 Inter Europol Competition**	(France) No. 29 Richard Mille by TDS	(United Kingdom) No. 15 RLR MSport	(Switzerland) No. 55 Spirit of Race	Report
2	(France) Le Castellet	(France) Reshad de Gerus (France) Paul Lafargue **(Netherlands) Job van Uitert**	**(Mexico) Sebastián Álvarez (France) Tom Dillmann (France) Vladislav Lomko**	(Switzerland) Mathias Beche (United States) Rodrigo Sales (Switzerland) Grégoire Saucy	(United Kingdom) Nick Adcock (Denmark) Michael Jensen (France) Gaël Julien	(United Kingdom) Duncan Cameron (Republic of Ireland) Matt Griffin (South Africa) David Perel	Report
3	(Italy) Imola	(France) No. 65 Panis Racing	**(France) No. 65 Panis Racing**	(Portugal) No. 20 Algarve Pro Racing	(Italy) No. 11 EuroInternational	(Italy) No. 85 Iron Dames	Report
3	(Italy) Imola	(Monaco) Arthur Leclerc (Venezuela) Manuel Maldonado **(France) Charles Milesi**	**(Monaco) Arthur Leclerc (Venezuela) Manuel Maldonado (France) Charles Milesi**	(United Kingdom) Richard Bradley (Greece) Kriton Lendoudis (United Kingdom) Alex Quinn	(Canada) Adam Ali (United Kingdom) Matthew Richard Bell	(Belgium) Sarah Bovy (Switzerland) Rahel Frey (Denmark) Michelle Gatting	Report
4	(Belgium) Spa-Francorchamps	(United States) No. 14 AO by TF	**(United States) No. 14 AO by TF**	(Italy) No. 83 AF Corse	(Italy) No. 11 Eurointernational	(Switzerland) No. 57 Kessel Racing	Report
4	(Belgium) Spa-Francorchamps	(Switzerland) **Louis Delétraz** (United Kingdom) Jonny Edgar (Poland) Robert Kubica	**(Switzerland) Louis Delétraz (United Kingdom) Jonny Edgar (Poland) Robert Kubica**	(France) François Perrodo (Italy) Alessio Rovera (France) Matthieu Vaxivière	(Canada) Adam Ali (United Kingdom) Matthew Richard Bell	(Japan) Takeshi Kimura (France) Esteban Masson (Brazil) Daniel Serra	Report
5	(Italy) Mugello	(Italy) No. 9 Iron Lynx – Proton	**(Italy) No. 9 Iron Lynx – Proton**	(France) No. 29 Richard Mille by TDS	(Poland) No. 8 Team Virage	(Switzerland) No. 57 Kessel Racing	Report
5	(Italy) Mugello	(Italy) **Matteo Cairoli** (France) Macéo Capietto (Germany) Jonas Ried	**(Italy) Matteo Cairoli** **(France) Macéo Capietto** **(Germany) Jonas Ried**	(Switzerland) Mathias Beche (United States) Rodrigo Sales (Switzerland) Grégoire Saucy	(Algeria) Julien Gerbi (France) Gillian Henrion (Portugal) Bernardo Pinheiro	(Japan) Takeshi Kimura (France) Esteban Masson (Brazil) Daniel Serra	Report
6	(Portugal) Algarve	(France) No. 65 Panis Racing	**(Switzerland) No. 37 COOL Racing**	(Germany) No. 77 Proton Competition	(Switzerland) No. 17 COOL Racing	(Italy) No. 63 Iron Lynx	Report
6	(Portugal) Algarve	(Monaco) Arthur Leclerc (Venezuela) Manuel Maldonado **(France) Charles Milesi**	**(Spain) Lorenzo Fluxá** **(Denmark) Malthe Jakobsen** **(Japan) Ritomo Miyata**	(Austria) René Binder (Italy) Giorgio Roda (Netherlands) Bent Viscaal	(Portugal) Miguel Cristóvão (Portugal) Manuel Espírito Santo	(Italy) Andrea Caldarelli (Japan) Hiroshi Hamaguchi (Zimbabwe) Axcil Jeffries	Report

== Season report ==
=== Barcelona ===
The ELMS season began with the 4 Hours of Barcelona, for which Ben Hanley took the overall pole in the #22 United Autosports Oreca. The lead was lost in the opening hour, as Lorenzo Fluxá in the #37 Cool Racing entry caught #22's Filip Ugran napping at the end of a Full-Course Yellow period. Though Cool Racing (then driven by Ritomo Miyata) briefly lost the lead to the Algarve Pro Racing #25 piloted by Olli Caldwell, a quicker stop allowed the Swiss team to retake the lead with Malthe Jakobsen. He later crossed the line first, with Alex Lynn in the #25 holding off Hanley's #22 for second. In the LMP2 Pro-Am class, the #83 AF Corse crew (Perrodo/Rovera/Vaxivière) triumphed over the #29 of Richard Mille by TDS thanks to a superior pit strategy, whereas the #8 Team Virage (Gerbi/Pinheiro/Henrion) won in LMP3. Though GT was dominated by the #85 Iron Dames outfit, a stray wheel nut during its final stop terminally damaged the car, handing the victory to Formula Racing's #50 Ferrari 296 GT3 of Nicklas Nielsen, Johnny Laursen and Conrad Laursen.

=== Le Castellet ===
Le Castellet yielded chaos at the front of the LMP2 field, as the leading #37 Cool Racing and later #34 Inter Europol Competition squads both retired with mechanical problems inside of the final hour. That left Tom Dillmann, who had previously passed polesitter Job van Uitert (#28 IDEC Sport) with a daring move at Signes, to inherit the win in the remaining #43 Inter Europol (alongside Vladislav Lomko and Sebastián Álvarez). Cool Racing's #47 and the #14 AO by TF completed the podium, while Richard Mille by TDS won Pro-Am after the #83 fell down the order late on due to high tyre wear. Despite incurring a starting infringement penalty, the #15 RLR MSport won LMP3 with a fuel saving final stint from Gaël Julien; LMGT3 was won by the #55 Spirit of Race team led by David Perel.

=== Imola ===
Charles Milesi in the #65 Panis Racing Oreca took pole for the 4 Hours of Imola and later recovered the lead in the pits from the #14 AO by TF driven by Louis Delétraz. Milesi drove out a gap of 11 seconds and took the checkered flag from Delétraz and Vector Sport driver Felipe Drugovich, who held off advances from the pit lane-starting #43 of Dillmann. Algarve Pro took victory in LMP2 Pro-Am (Lendoudis/Bradley/Quinn), the #11 Eurointernational of Matthew Richard Bell and Adam Ali beat the #8 Team Virage entry in LMP3, and Michelle Gatting was able to resist the pressure of Valentin Hasse-Clot to triumph in LMGT3 with her Iron Dames teammates Sarah Bovy and Rahel Frey.

Following the race, the #65 Panis car of Milesi, Arthur Leclerc, and Manuel Maldonado received a 35-second penalty in lieu of a drive-through for a FCY-infringement, giving the win to the #14. However, the original result was reinstated weeks later following an appeal.

=== Spa-Francorchamps ===
Belgium saw a commanding performance from the #14 AO by TF: the team took pole with Delétraz and recovered its lead thanks to an overtake from Robert Kubica on the off-strategy #22 United. Delétraz narrowly won ahead of Dillmann's #43 Inter Europol, with IDEC Sport finishing third after the Panis car of Milesi dropped off in pace during the closing laps. A collision for Richard Mille by TDS driver Grégoire Saucy with a GT car gave a championship advantage to the #83 AF Corse crew, who won the race in dominant fashion. A dramatic collision occurred in LMGT3, where the championship-leading #63 Iron Lynx Lamborghini, damaged by prior contact with an LMP2 entry, heavily damaged the sister #85 Iron Dames entry. This allowed the #57 Kessel Racing Ferrari of Daniel Serra, Esteban Masson, and Takeshi Kimura to win ahead of GR Racing's #86 and the AF Corse #51 in a Ferrari 1-2-3. Eurointernational meanwhile completed a recovery drive from the Les Combes gravel trap to the win in LMP3, putting the #11 crew of Bell and Ali to the top of the standings.

=== Mugello ===
The first ELMS race at Mugello was controlled by the #9 of Iron Lynx – Proton. Led by Matteo Cairoli, the team took pole and, after an overtake from Macéo Capietto on Olli Caldwell, drove out to a victory ahead of the #25 APR and #34 Inter Europol. In LMP3, Gillian Henrion, helped by a slow final stop for the leading #15 RLR crew, was able to take Team Virage to victory again by stretching his fuel during a long final stint. Contact for Alessio Rovera with the #63 Iron Lynx meanwhile put the #83 AF Corse Oreca out of contention for the LMP2 Pro-Am win, which was taken by Mathias Beche's #29. The LMGT3 win was once again taken by the #57 Kessel Ferrari, as Serra made his way past the #97 Grid Motorsport Aston Martin of Lorcan Hanafin with six minutes to go.

The race was red-flagged following an incident between Rahel Frey and Claudio Schiavoni, the latter being tapped into the right-side wall in his Porsche.

=== Portimão ===
Going into the season finale in Portimão, there were three-way fights for the LMP2, LMP2 Pro-Am, and LMP3 championships, whilst LMGT3 included nine entries which had a mathematical chance of claiming the title. Aided by a falsely applied penalty to the #43 Inter Europol car, which ended up second in the standings, the #14 AO by TF crew of Jonny Edgar, Robert Kubica, and Louis Delétraz won the ELMS LMP2 drivers' title with a second place. They were beaten in the race by Cool Racing's #37, which became the only LMP2 squad to win multiple races throughout the campaign. They snatched third in the standings as Charles Milesi, the polesitter, caused a late collision with the #10 Vector Sport which gave the #65 Panis car a penalty.

The other three classes brought huge drama: in LMP2 Pro-Am, an audacious fuel saving strategy from Alex Quinn nearly gave the #20 Algarve Pro the title, before a last-lap overtake by race-winning Bent Viscaal of the #77 Proton team gave it to the #83 AF Corse outfit. In LMP3, Gaël Julien helped the #15 RLR MSport (co-driven by Michael Jensen and Nick Adcock) to win the title by overtaking Adam Ali in the #11 Eurointernational, which finished second overall; the race was won by the #17 Cool Racing led by Manuel Espírito Santo. LMGT3, in turn, was decided at the last turn, where the leading Iron Dames let the sister #63 Iron Lynx team of Hiroshi Hamaguchi, Axcil Jefferies, and Andrea Caldarelli through to take the victory and, by extension, the championship.

== Drivers' Championships ==
Points are awarded according to the following structure:

Position	**1st**	**2nd**	**3rd**	**4th**	**5th**	**6th**	**7th**	**8th**	**9th**	**10th**	**Pole**
Points	25	18	15	12	10	8	6	4	2	1	1

=== LMP2 Drivers Championship ===
Pos.	Driver	Team	BAR (Spain)	LEC (France)	IMO (Italy)	SPA (Belgium)	MUG (Italy)	POR (Portugal)	Points
1	(Switzerland) Louis Delétraz	(United States) AO by TF	7	3	2	**1**	5	2	93
1	(United Kingdom) Jonny Edgar	(United States) AO by TF	7	3	2	**1**	5	2	93
1	(Poland) Robert Kubica	(United States) AO by TF	7	3	2	**1**	5	2	93
2	(Mexico) Sebastián Álvarez	(Poland) Inter Europol Competition	6	1	4	2	7	4	81
2	(France) Tom Dillmann	(Poland) Inter Europol Competition	6	1	4	2	7	4	81
2	(France) Vladislav Lomko	(Poland) Inter Europol Competition	6	1	4	2	7	4	81
3	(Spain) Lorenzo Fluxá	(Switzerland) Cool Racing	1	Ret	Ret	5	9	1	62
3	(Denmark) Malthe Jakobsen	(Switzerland) Cool Racing	1	Ret	Ret	5	9	1	62
3	(Japan) Ritomo Miyata	(Switzerland) Cool Racing	1	Ret		5	9	1	62
4	(Monaco) Arthur Leclerc	(France) Panis Racing	5	8	**1**	6	4	**12**	61
4	(Venezuela) Manuel Maldonado	(France) Panis Racing	5	8	**1**	6	4	**12**	61
4	(France) Charles Milesi	(France) Panis Racing	5	8	**1**	6	4	**12**	61
5	(United Kingdom) Olli Caldwell	(Portugal) Algarve Pro Racing	2	7	8	14	2	8	50
5	(Liechtenstein) Matthias Kaiser	(Portugal) Algarve Pro Racing	2	7	8	14	2	8	50
5	(United Kingdom) Alex Lynn	(Portugal) Algarve Pro Racing	2	7	8	14	2	8	50
6	(France) Reshad de Gerus	(France) IDEC Sport	4	**4**	5	3	Ret	13	50
6	(Netherlands) Job van Uitert	(France) IDEC Sport	4	**4**	5	3	Ret	13	50
7	(Italy) Luca Ghiotto	(Poland) Inter Europol Competition	8	Ret	7	4	3	5	47
7	(United Kingdom) Oliver Gray	(Poland) Inter Europol Competition	8	Ret	7	4	3	5	47
7	(France) Clément Novalak	(Poland) Inter Europol Competition	8	Ret	7	4	3	5	47
8	(Italy) Matteo Cairoli	(Italy) Iron Lynx – Proton	Ret	9	Ret	7	**1**	9	36
8	(France) Macéo Capietto	(Italy) Iron Lynx – Proton	Ret	9	Ret	7	**1**	9	36
8	(Germany) Jonas Ried	(Italy) Iron Lynx – Proton	Ret	9	Ret	7	**1**	9	36
9	(Denmark) Frederik Vesti	(Switzerland) Cool Racing	12	2	10	11	13	3	34
10	(United Kingdom) Ben Hanley	(United Kingdom) United Autosports	**3**	5	11	9	11	10	29
10	(Japan) Marino Sato	(United Kingdom) United Autosports	**3**	5	11	9	11	10	29
10	(Romania) Filip Ugran	(United Kingdom) United Autosports	**3**	5	11	9	11	10	29
11	(United Kingdom) Paul di Resta	(United Kingdom) United Autosports	9	12	6	10	6	6	27
11	(United States) Bijoy Garg	(United Kingdom) United Autosports	9	12	6	10	6	6	27
11	(Switzerland) Fabio Scherer	(United Kingdom) United Autosports	9	12	6	10	6	6	27
12	(Argentina) Marcos Siebert	(France) IDEC Sport			5	3			25
13	(France) Paul Lafargue	(France) IDEC Sport	4	**4**					25
14	(Republic of Ireland) Ryan Cullen	(United Kingdom) Vector Sport	10	10	3	8	12	Ret	21
14	(Monaco) Stéphane Richelmi	(United Kingdom) Vector Sport	10	10	3	8	12	Ret	21
15	(Brazil) Felipe Drugovich	(United Kingdom) Vector Sport	10	10	3	8		Ret	21
16	(Australia) James Allen	(France) Duqueine Team	11	6	9	12	8	7	20
16	(France) Jean-Baptiste Simmenauer	(France) Duqueine Team	11	6	9	12	8	7	20
17	(Netherlands) Niels Koolen	(France) Duqueine Team	11	6	9		8	7	20
18	(France) Paul-Loup Chatin	(Switzerland) Cool Racing	12	2	Ret				18
19	(Mexico) Alex García	(Switzerland) Cool Racing	12	2					18
20	(Austria) Ferdinand Habsburg	(Switzerland) Cool Racing			10	11	13	3	16
20	(Thailand) Carl Bennett	(Switzerland) Cool Racing			10	11	13	3	16
21	(United Kingdom) Will Stevens	(United Kingdom) Nielsen Racing	13	11	12	13	10	11	1
22	(Denmark) Benjamin Pedersen	(United Kingdom) Nielsen Racing				13	10	11	1
23	(Chile) Nico Pino	(United Kingdom) Nielsen Racing	13	11	12				0
23	(Chile) Nico Pino	(France) IDEC Sport					Ret	13	0
24	(Denmark) David Heinemeier Hansson	(United Kingdom) Nielsen Racing	13	11	12	13			0
25	(France) Gabriel Aubry	(United Kingdom) Nielsen Racing						11	0
26	(Sweden) Rasmus Lindh	(France) Duqueine Team				12			0
27	(France) Patrick Pilet	(United Kingdom) Vector Sport					12		0
Pos.	Driver	Team	BAR (Spain)	LEC (France)	IMO (Italy)	SPA (Belgium)	MUG (Italy)	POR (Portugal)	Points

Key
Colour	Result
Gold	Race winner
Silver	2nd place
Bronze	3rd place
Green	Points finish
Blue	Non-points finish
Blue	Non-classified finish (NC)
Purple	Did not finish (Ret)
Black	Disqualified (DSQ)
Black	Excluded (EX)
White	Did not start (DNS)
White	Race cancelled (C)
White	Withdrew (WD)
Blank	Did not participate

**Bold** – Pole

Italics – Fastest lap

=== LMP2 Pro/Am Drivers Championship ===
Pos.	Driver	Team	BAR (Spain)	LEC (France)	IMO (Italy)	SPA (Belgium)	MUG (Italy)	POR (Portugal)	Points
1	(France) François Perrodo	(Italy) AF Corse	1	4	2	1	7	4	98
1	(Italy) Alessio Rovera	(Italy) AF Corse	1	4	2	1	7	4	98
1	(France) Matthieu Vaxivière	(Italy) AF Corse	1	4	2	1	7	4	98
2	(United Kingdom) Richard Bradley	(Portugal) Algarve Pro Racing	4	6	1	3	2	2	96
2	(Greece) Kriton Lendoudis	(Portugal) Algarve Pro Racing	4	6	1	3	2	2	96
2	(United Kingdom) Alex Quinn	(Portugal) Algarve Pro Racing	4	6	1	3	2	2	96
3	(Austria) René Binder	(Germany) Proton Competition	**5**	**2**	**8**	2	**3**	**1**	95
3	(Italy) Giorgio Roda	(Germany) Proton Competition	**5**	**2**	**8**	2	**3**	**1**	95
3	(Netherlands) Bent Viscaal	(Germany) Proton Competition	**5**	**2**	**8**	2	**3**	**1**	95
4	(Switzerland) Mathias Beche	(France) Richard Mille by TDS	2	1	3	**Ret**	1	5	94
4	(United States) Rodrigo Sales	(France) Richard Mille by TDS	2	1	3	**Ret**	1	5	94
4	(Switzerland) Grégoire Saucy	(France) Richard Mille by TDS	2	1	3	**Ret**	1	5	94
5	(United States) John Falb	(United Kingdom) Nielsen Racing	3	5	6	4	5	3	70
5	(United Kingdom) Colin Noble	(United Kingdom) Nielsen Racing	3	5	6	4	5	3	70
6	(United Kingdom) Andy Meyrick	(United Kingdom) United Autosports	7	3	7	6	4	Ret	47
6	(Brazil) Daniel Schneider	(United Kingdom) United Autosports	7	3	7	6	4	Ret	47
7	(United Kingdom) Oliver Jarvis	(United Kingdom) United Autosports	7	3	7		4	Ret	39
8	(Turkey) Cem Bölükbaşı	(Luxembourg) DKR Engineering	6	8	5	5	Ret	7	38
8	(Germany) Laurents Hörr	(Luxembourg) DKR Engineering	6	8	5	5	Ret	7	38
8	(Australia) Andres Latorre Canon	(Luxembourg) DKR Engineering	6	8	5	5	Ret	7	38
9	(United Kingdom) Nick Yelloly	(United Kingdom) Nielsen Racing				4	5	3	37
10	(Spain) Albert Costa	(United Kingdom) Nielsen Racing	3	5	6				33
11	(United Kingdom) Anthony Wells	(Poland) Team Virage	NC	7	4	7			24
12	(France) Tristan Vautier	(Poland) Team Virage				7	6	6	22
13	(United Kingdom) Matt Bell	(Poland) Team Virage	NC	7	4				18
13	(Brazil) Nelson Piquet Jr.	(Poland) Team Virage	NC	7	4				18
14	(Greece) Georgios Kolovos	(Poland) Team Virage					6	6	16
14	(France) Raphaël Narac	(Poland) Team Virage					6	6	16
15	(Portugal) Filipe Albuquerque	(United Kingdom) United Autosports				6			8
16	(United Kingdom) Wayne Boyd	(Poland) Team Virage				7			6
Pos.	Driver	Team	BAR (Spain)	LEC (France)	IMO (Italy)	SPA (Belgium)	MUG (Italy)	POR (Portugal)	Points

Key
Colour	Result
Gold	Race winner
Silver	2nd place
Bronze	3rd place
Green	Points finish
Blue	Non-points finish
Blue	Non-classified finish (NC)
Purple	Did not finish (Ret)
Black	Disqualified (DSQ)
Black	Excluded (EX)
White	Did not start (DNS)
White	Race cancelled (C)
White	Withdrew (WD)
Blank	Did not participate

**Bold** – Pole

Italics – Fastest lap

=== LMP3 Drivers Championship ===
Pos.	Driver	Team	BAR (Spain)	LEC (France)	IMO (Italy)	SPA (Belgium)	MUG (Italy)	POR (Portugal)	Points
1	(United Kingdom) Nick Adcock	(United Kingdom) RLR MSport	4	**1**	4	**4**	2	2	99
1	(Denmark) Michael Jensen	(United Kingdom) RLR MSport	4	**1**	4	**4**	2	2	99
1	(France) Gaël Julien	(United Kingdom) RLR MSport	4	**1**	4	**4**	2	2	99
2	(Canada) Adam Ali	(Italy) EuroInternational	3	4	1	1	7	3	98
2	(United Kingdom) Matthew Richard Bell	(Italy) EuroInternational	3	4	1	1	7	3	98
3	(Algeria) Julien Gerbi	(Poland) Team Virage	1	7	2	6	1	6	90
3	(France) Gillian Henrion	(Poland) Team Virage	1	7	2	6	1	6	90
4	(Portugal) Bernardo Pinheiro	(Poland) Team Virage	1	7 (Note: Pinheiro and García did not fulfil their mandated minimum drive time at the 4 Hours of Le Castellet, meaning that they did not receive points for that event.)	2	6	1	6 (Note: Bernardo Pinheiro did not fulfil his mandated minimum drive time at the 4 Hours of Portimão, meaning that he did not receive points for that event.)	76
5	(Portugal) Miguel Cristóvão	(Switzerland) Cool Racing	**2**	5	8	3	**Ret**	**1**	75
5	(Portugal) Manuel Espírito Santo	(Switzerland) Cool Racing	**2**	5	8	3	**Ret**	**1**	75
6	(United States) Wyatt Brichacek	(Luxembourg) DKR Engineering	5	2	**6**	7	Ret	5	53
6	(Germany) Alexander Mattschull	(Luxembourg) DKR Engineering	5	2	**6**	7	Ret	5	53
7	(France) Jean-Baptiste Lahaye	(France) Ultimate	9	3	3	5	5	Ret	52
8	(Switzerland) Cédric Oltramare	(Switzerland) Cool Racing	**2**	5	8	3	**Ret**		49
9	(France) Antoine Doquin	(Switzerland) Racing Spirit of Léman	7	6	Ret	2	4	Ret	44
9	(France) Jean-Ludovic Foubert	(Switzerland) Racing Spirit of Léman	7	6	Ret	2	4	Ret	44
9	(France) Jacques Wolff	(Switzerland) Racing Spirit of Léman	7	6	Ret	2	4	Ret	44
10	(Germany) Torsten Kratz	(Germany) WTM by Rinaldi Racing	8	Ret	5	8	6	4	38
10	(Colombia) Óscar Tunjo	(Germany) WTM by Rinaldi Racing	8	Ret	5	8	6	4	38
10	(Germany) Leonard Weiss	(Germany) WTM by Rinaldi Racing	8	Ret	5	8	6	4	38
11	(France) Matthieu Lahaye	(France) Ultimate	9	3	3	5 (Note: Matthieu Lahaye did not fulfil his mandated minimum drive time at the 4 Hours of Spa-Francorchamps, meaning that he did not receive points for that event.)	5 (Note: Matthieu Lahaye and Pedro Perino did not fulfil their mandated minimum drive time at the 4 Hours of Mugello, meaning that they did not receive points for that event.)	Ret	32
12	(United Kingdom) Kai Askey	(Poland) Inter Europol Competition	6	Ret	9	9	3	Ret	27
12	(United Arab Emirates) Alexander Bukhantsov	(Poland) Inter Europol Competition	6	Ret	9	9	3	Ret	27
13	(Canada) Daniel Ali	(United Kingdom) RLR MSport	Ret	8	7	10	8	7	21
13	(Canada) James Dayson	(United Kingdom) RLR MSport	Ret	8	7	10	8	7	21
13	(United Kingdom) Bailey Voisin	(United Kingdom) RLR MSport	Ret	8	7	10	8	7	21
14	(Spain) Belén García	(Luxembourg) DKR Engineering	5	2	**6**	WD			19
15	(France) Eric Trouillet	(France) Ultimate		3					15
16	(France) Paul Lanchère	(France) Ultimate			3				15
17	(Portugal) Guilherme Oliveira	(Luxembourg) DKR Engineering					Ret	5	10
18	(France) Louis Rossi	(France) Ultimate				5			10
19	(France) Louis Stern	(France) Ultimate					5		10
20	(Mozambique) Pedro Perino	(Poland) Inter Europol Competition	6	Ret	9 (Note: Perino and Adam did not fulfil their mandated minimum drive time at the 4 Hours of Imola, meaning that they did not receive points for that event.)	9	3	Ret	10
21	(France) Alexandre Yvon	(France) Ultimate	9						2
22	(France) François Hériau	(France) Ultimate						Ret	0
Pos.	Driver	Team	BAR (Spain)	LEC (France)	IMO (Italy)	SPA (Belgium)	MUG (Italy)	POR (Portugal)	Points

Key
Colour	Result
Gold	Race winner
Silver	2nd place
Bronze	3rd place
Green	Points finish
Blue	Non-points finish
Blue	Non-classified finish (NC)
Purple	Did not finish (Ret)
Black	Disqualified (DSQ)
Black	Excluded (EX)
White	Did not start (DNS)
White	Race cancelled (C)
White	Withdrew (WD)
Blank	Did not participate

**Bold** – Pole

Italics – Fastest lap

=== LMGT3 Drivers Championship ===
Pos.	Driver	Team	BAR (Spain)	LEC (France)	IMO (Italy)	SPA (Belgium)	MUG (Italy)	POR (Portugal)	Points
1	(Italy) Andrea Caldarelli	(Italy) Iron Lynx	3	2	3	**Ret**	9	1	76
1	(Japan) Hiroshi Hamaguchi	(Italy) Iron Lynx	3	2	3	**Ret**	9	1	76
1	(Zimbabwe) Axcil Jefferies	(Italy) Iron Lynx	3	2	3	**Ret**	9	1	76
2	(Japan) Takeshi Kimura	(Switzerland) Kessel Racing	9	Ret	4	1	1	5	74
2	(France) Esteban Masson	(Switzerland) Kessel Racing	9	Ret	4	1	1	5	74
2	(Brazil) Daniel Serra	(Switzerland) Kessel Racing	9	Ret	4	1	1	5	74
3	(United States) Derek DeBoer	(Switzerland) Racing Spirit of Léman	6	3	2	4	**5**	9	66
3	(France) Valentin Hasse-Clot	(Switzerland) Racing Spirit of Léman	6	3	2	4	**5**	9	66
3	(United Kingdom) Casper Stevenson	(Switzerland) Racing Spirit of Léman	6	3	2	4	**5**	9	66
4	(Belgium) Sarah Bovy	(Italy) Iron Dames	**Ret**	**4**	**1**	Ret	7	**2**	65
4	(Switzerland) Rahel Frey	(Italy) Iron Dames	**Ret**	**4**	**1**	Ret	7	**2**	65
4	(Denmark) Michelle Gatting	(Italy) Iron Dames	**Ret**	**4**	**1**	Ret	7	**2**	65
5	(Italy) Riccardo Pera	(United Kingdom) GR Racing	2	5	7	2	8	6	64
5	(Italy) Davide Rigon	(United Kingdom) GR Racing	2	5	7	2	8	6	64
5	(United Kingdom) Michael Wainwright	(United Kingdom) GR Racing	2	5	7	2	8	6	64
6	(Denmark) Conrad Laursen	(Denmark) Formula Racing	1	9	9	Ret	3	4	56
6	(Denmark) Johnny Laursen	(Denmark) Formula Racing	1	9	9	Ret	3	4	56
7	(Australia) Martin Berry	(United Kingdom) Grid Motorsport by TF	7	7	5	5	2	8	54
7	(United Kingdom) Lorcan Hanafin	(United Kingdom) Grid Motorsport by TF	7	7	5	5	2	8	54
8	(France) Emmanuel Collard	(Italy) AF Corse	8	6	6	3	4	Ret	47
8	(France) Charles-Henri Samani	(Italy) AF Corse	8	6	6	3	4	Ret	47
9	(United Kingdom) Duncan Cameron	(Switzerland) Spirit of Race	5	1	8	Ret	Ret	7	45
9	(Republic of Ireland) Matt Griffin	(Switzerland) Spirit of Race	5	1	8	Ret	Ret	7	45
9	(South Africa) David Perel	(Switzerland) Spirit of Race	5	1	8	Ret	Ret	7	45
10	(Denmark) Nicklas Nielsen	(Denmark) Formula Racing	1	9	9	Ret	3		44
11	(United Kingdom) Jonathan Adam	(United Kingdom) Grid Motorsport by TF	7	7	5	5	2	8	44
12	(Argentina) Nicolás Varrone	(Italy) AF Corse		6	6	3	4	Ret	43
13	(France) Julien Andlauer	(Germany) Proton Competition	4	8	11	6	Ret	3	39
13	(Italy) Matteo Cressoni	(Germany) Proton Competition	4	8	11	6	Ret	3	39
13	(Italy) Claudio Schiavoni	(Germany) Proton Competition	4	8	11	6	Ret	3	39
14	(United Kingdom) Ben Tuck	(United Kingdom) JMW Motorsport	Ret	10	10	Ret	6	10	11
15	(United States) Jason Hart	(United Kingdom) JMW Motorsport					6	10	9
15	(United States) Scott Noble	(United Kingdom) JMW Motorsport					6	10	9
16	(Belgium) Ulysse de Pauw	(Italy) AF Corse	8						4
17	(United Kingdom) John Hartshorne	(United Kingdom) JMW Motorsport	Ret	10	10	Ret			2
17	(United Kingdom) Phil Keen	(United Kingdom) JMW Motorsport	Ret	10	10	Ret			2
Pos.	Driver	Team	BAR (Spain)	LEC (France)	IMO (Italy)	SPA (Belgium)	MUG (Italy)	POR (Portugal)	Points

Key
Colour	Result
Gold	Race winner
Silver	2nd place
Bronze	3rd place
Green	Points finish
Blue	Non-points finish
Blue	Non-classified finish (NC)
Purple	Did not finish (Ret)
Black	Disqualified (DSQ)
Black	Excluded (EX)
White	Did not start (DNS)
White	Race cancelled (C)
White	Withdrew (WD)
Blank	Did not participate

**Bold** – Pole

Italics – Fastest lap

== Teams' Championships ==
Points are awarded according to the following structure:

Position	**1st**	**2nd**	**3rd**	**4th**	**5th**	**6th**	**7th**	**8th**	**9th**	**10th**	**Pole**
Points	25	18	15	12	10	8	6	4	2	1	1

=== LMP2 Teams Championship ===
Pos.	Team	Car	BAR (Spain)	LEC (France)	IMO (Italy)	SPA (Belgium)	MUG (Italy)	POR (Portugal)	Points
1	(United States) #14 AO by TF	Oreca 07	7	3	2	**1**	5	2	93
2	(Poland) #43 Inter Europol Competition	Oreca 07	6	1	4	2	7	4	81
3	(Switzerland) #37 Cool Racing	Oreca 07	1	Ret	Ret	5	9	1	62
4	(France) #65 Panis Racing	Oreca 07	5	8	**1**	6	4	**12**	61
5	(Portugal) #25 Algarve Pro Racing	Oreca 07	2	7	8	14	2	8	50
6	(France) #28 IDEC Sport	Oreca 07	4	**4**	5	3	Ret	13	50
7	(Poland) #34 Inter Europol Competition	Oreca 07	8	Ret	7	4	3	5	47
8	(Italy) #9 Iron Lynx – Proton	Oreca 07	Ret	9	Ret	7	**1**	9	36
9	(Switzerland) #47 Cool Racing	Oreca 07	12	2	10	11	13	3	34
10	(United Kingdom) #22 United Autosports	Oreca 07	**3**	5	11	9	11	10	29
11	(United Kingdom) #23 United Autosports	Oreca 07	9	12	6	10	6	6	27
12	(United Kingdom) #10 Vector Sport	Oreca 07	10	10	3	8	12	Ret	21
13	(France) #30 Duqueine Team	Oreca 07	11	6	9	12	8	7	20
14	(United Kingdom) #27 Nielsen Racing	Oreca 07	13	11	12	13	10	11	1
Pos.	Team	Car	BAR (Spain)	LEC (France)	IMO (Italy)	SPA (Belgium)	MUG (Italy)	POR (Portugal)	Points

Key
Colour	Result
Gold	Race winner
Silver	2nd place
Bronze	3rd place
Green	Points finish
Blue	Non-points finish
Blue	Non-classified finish (NC)
Purple	Did not finish (Ret)
Black	Disqualified (DSQ)
Black	Excluded (EX)
White	Did not start (DNS)
White	Race cancelled (C)
White	Withdrew (WD)
Blank	Did not participate

**Bold** – Pole

Italics – Fastest lap

=== LMP2 Pro/Am Teams Championship ===
Pos.	Team	Car	BAR (Spain)	LEC (France)	IMO (Italy)	SPA (Belgium)	MUG (Italy)	POR (Portugal)	Points
1	(Italy) #83 AF Corse	Oreca 07	1	4	2	1	7	4	98
2	(Portugal) #20 Algarve Pro Racing	Oreca 07	4	6	1	3	2	2	96
3	(Germany) #77 Proton Competition	Oreca 07	**5**	**2**	**8**	2	**3**	**1**	95
4	(France) #29 Richard Mille by TDS	Oreca 07	2	1	3	**Ret**	1	5	94
5	(United Kingdom) #24 Nielsen Racing	Oreca 07	3	5	6	4	5	3	70
6	(United Kingdom) #21 United Autosports	Oreca 07	7	3	7	6	4	Ret	47
7	(Poland) #19 Team Virage	Oreca 07	NC	7	4	7	6	6	40
8	(Luxembourg) #3 DKR Engineering	Oreca 07	6	8	5	5	Ret	7	38
Pos.	Team	Car	BAR (Spain)	LEC (France)	IMO (Italy)	SPA (Belgium)	MUG (Italy)	POR (Portugal)	Points

Key
Colour	Result
Gold	Race winner
Silver	2nd place
Bronze	3rd place
Green	Points finish
Blue	Non-points finish
Blue	Non-classified finish (NC)
Purple	Did not finish (Ret)
Black	Disqualified (DSQ)
Black	Excluded (EX)
White	Did not start (DNS)
White	Race cancelled (C)
White	Withdrew (WD)
Blank	Did not participate

**Bold** – Pole

Italics – Fastest lap

=== LMP3 Teams Championship ===
Pos.	Team	Car	BAR (Spain)	LEC (France)	IMO (Italy)	SPA (Belgium)	MUG (Italy)	POR (Portugal)	Points
1	(United Kingdom) #15 RLR MSport	Ligier JS P320	4	**1**	4	**4**	2	2	99
2	(Italy) #11 EuroInternational	Ligier JS P320	3	4	1	1	7	3	98
3	(Poland) #8 Team Virage	Ligier JS P320	1	7	2	6	1	6	90
4	(Switzerland) #17 Cool Racing	Ligier JS P320	**2**	5	8	3	**Ret**	**1**	75
5	(Luxembourg) #4 DKR Engineering	Duqueine M30 - D08	5	2	6	7	Ret	5	53
6	(France) #35 Ultimate	Ligier JS P320	9	3	3	5	5	Ret	52
7	(Switzerland) #31 Racing Spirit of Léman	Ligier JS P320	7	6	Ret	2	4	Ret	44
8	(Germany) #12 WTM by Rinaldi Racing	Duqueine M30 - D08	8	Ret	5	8	6	4	38
9	(Poland) #88 Inter Europol Competition	Ligier JS P320	6	Ret	9	9	3	Ret	27
10	(United Kingdom) #5 RLR MSport	Ligier JS P320	Ret	8	7	10	8	7	21
Pos.	Team	Car	BAR (Spain)	LEC (France)	IMO (Italy)	SPA (Belgium)	MUG (Italy)	POR (Portugal)	Points

Key
Colour	Result
Gold	Race winner
Silver	2nd place
Bronze	3rd place
Green	Points finish
Blue	Non-points finish
Blue	Non-classified finish (NC)
Purple	Did not finish (Ret)
Black	Disqualified (DSQ)
Black	Excluded (EX)
White	Did not start (DNS)
White	Race cancelled (C)
White	Withdrew (WD)
Blank	Did not participate

**Bold** – Pole

Italics – Fastest lap

=== LMGT3 Teams Championship ===
Pos.	Team	Car	BAR (Spain)	LEC (France)	IMO (Italy)	SPA (Belgium)	MUG (Italy)	POR (Portugal)	Points
1	(Italy) #63 Iron Lynx	Lamborghini Huracán GT3 Evo 2	3	2	3	**Ret**	9	1	76
2	(Switzerland) #57 Kessel Racing	Ferrari 296 GT3	9	11	4	1	1	5	74
3	(Switzerland) #59 Racing Spirit of Léman	Aston Martin Vantage AMR GT3 Evo	6	3	2	4	**5**	9	66
4	(Italy) #85 Iron Dames	Porsche 911 GT3 R (992)	**Ret**	**4**	**1**	Ret	7	**2**	65
5	(United Kingdom) #86 GR Racing	Ferrari 296 GT3	2	5	7	2	8	6	64
6	(Denmark) #50 Formula Racing	Ferrari 296 GT3	1	9	9	Ret	3	4	56
7	(United Kingdom) #97 Grid Motorsport by TF	Aston Martin Vantage AMR GT3 Evo	7	7	5	5	2	8	54
8	(Italy) #51 AF Corse	Ferrari 296 GT3	8	6	6	3	4	Ret	47
9	(Switzerland) #55 Spirit of Race	Ferrari 296 GT3	5	1	8	Ret	Ret	7	45
10	(Germany) #60 Proton Competition	Porsche 911 GT3 R (992)	4	8	11	6	Ret	3	39
11	(United Kingdom) #66 JMW Motorsport	Ferrari 296 GT3	Ret	10	10	Ret	6	10	11
Pos.	Team	Car	BAR (Spain)	LEC (France)	IMO (Italy)	SPA (Belgium)	MUG (Italy)	POR (Portugal)	Points

Key
Colour	Result
Gold	Race winner
Silver	2nd place
Bronze	3rd place
Green	Points finish
Blue	Non-points finish
Blue	Non-classified finish (NC)
Purple	Did not finish (Ret)
Black	Disqualified (DSQ)
Black	Excluded (EX)
White	Did not start (DNS)
White	Race cancelled (C)
White	Withdrew (WD)
Blank	Did not participate

**Bold** – Pole

Italics – Fastest lap
