= Casper Stevenson =

British racing driver (born 2003)

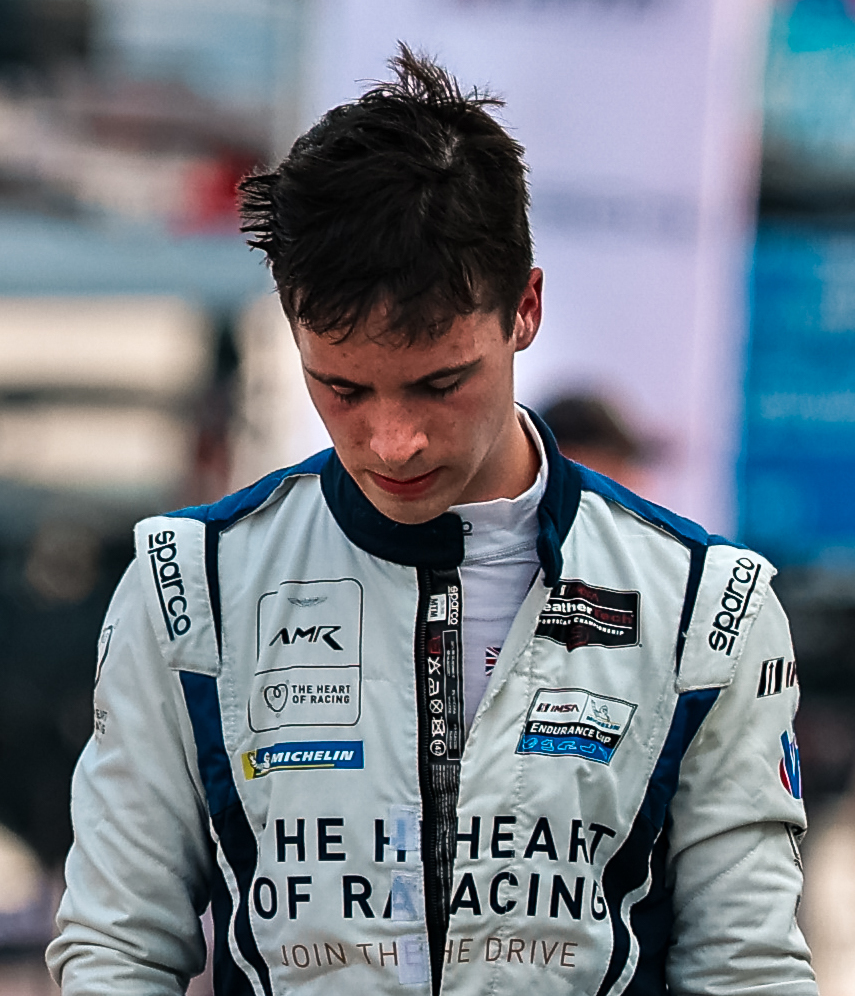
- Stevenson during the 2025 SportsCar Grand Prix
- Nationality: (United Kingdom) British
- Born: 22 April 2003 (age 23) London, United Kingdom

European Le Mans Series career
- Debut season: 2024
- Categorisation: FIA Silver
- Car number: 59
- Starts: 3
- Wins: 0
- Podiums: 2
- Poles: 0
- Best finish: 2nd in 2024

Previous series
- 2026 2023 2022 2022 2021 2020 2019 2018: Eurocup-3; FIA WEC; GTWC Europe Endurance Cup; GTWC Europe Sprint Cup; Euroformula Open Championship; F4 British Championship; Ginetta Junior Championship; Ginetta Winter Championship

Championship titles
- 2021: EF Open - Rookies' Championship

Awards
- 2020: F4 British Championship Scholarship

Casper Stevenson (born 22 April 2003) is a British racing driver competing in the IMSA SportsCar Championship for DragonSpeed.

Stevenson has primarily raced for Aston Martin customer teams in GT3. These include D'station Racing in the FIA World Endurance Championship, where he scored an LMGTE Am podium in 2023, and The Heart of Racing in IMSA, where he came third in the GTD standings in 2025. Previously in his single-seater career, he was Euroformula Open rookies' champion in 2021, and third in the F4 British Championship in 2020.

== Early career ==
=== Karting ===
Stevenson mainly developed his karting career in the United Kingdom, racing in the various classes of the Super 1 National Kart Championships.

=== Ginetta Junior Championship ===
Stevenson made his car racing debut in the winter series of the Ginetta Junior Championship in November 2018, before a full-time entry the following year with Richardson Racing. He finished the season sixth overall with nine podiums, and second in the rookie standings behind Zak O'Sullivan.

=== Formula 4 ===
In November 2019, following an assessment day at Silverstone, Stevenson won the inaugural F4 British Championship scholarship prize. He subsequently signed with new team Argenti Motorsport, which took over reigning champions Double R Racing's cars, for 2020. He started the year off with consistent points finishes, before a run of nine consecutive podiums halfway through the season propelled him to third in the standings. He achieved his first two wins in cars at Silverstone and Croft in the process.

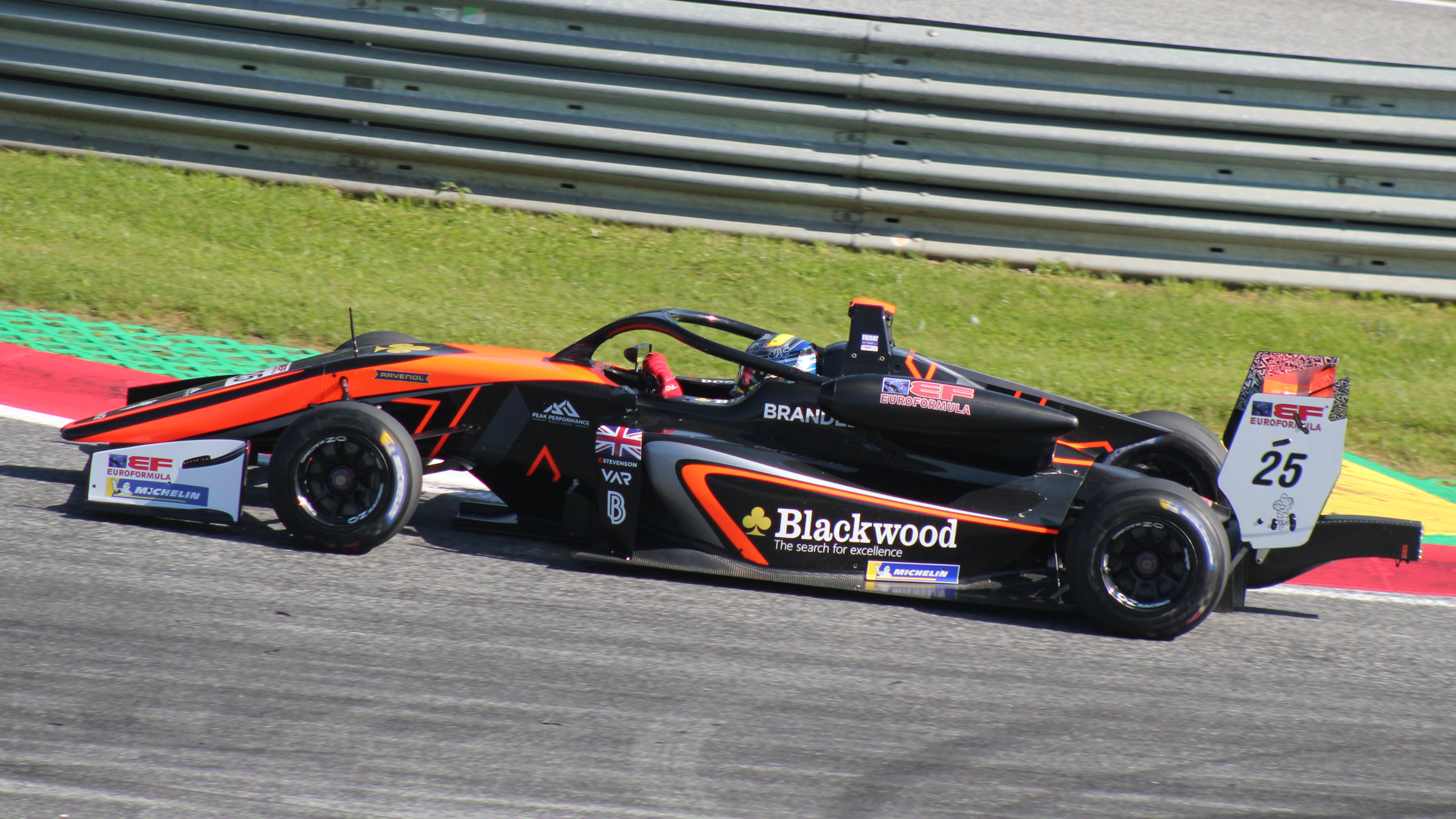
Stevenson at the Spielberg round of the 2021 Euroformula Open Championship.

=== Euroformula Open ===
Though initially planning to race in the Formula Regional European Championship for Van Amersfoort Racing in 2021, for which he prepared during the winter in Asian F3, Stevenson ended up joining the team in the Euroformula Open instead. He took two wins throughout the season on his way to sixth in the standings, and was crowned rookies' champion.

== Sportscar career ==
=== 2022: Debut in GT3 ===
Stevenson competed in the Gulf 12 Hours in January 2022, driving a Mercedes-AMG GT3 Evo for 2 Seas Motorsport. He finished fourth overall and third in his class, alongside gentleman drivers Ian Loggie and Morgan Tillbrook. Stevenson gained praise after a competitive stint that saw him close in on platinum-rated factory driver Ben Barnicoat, in what was his professional sportscar racing debut.

Stevenson then contested the GT World Challenge Europe for the AKKodis ASP Team, partnering Tommaso Mosca and Konstantin Tereshchenko in the Endurance Cup and Thomas Drouet in the Sprint Cup. Having taken six podiums from his first seven races before racing at the historic Spa 24 Hours in late July, Stevenson finished runner-up in the Silver class of the Sprint Cup and ninth in the Endurance Cup.

=== 2023: Step-up to the World Endurance Championship ===
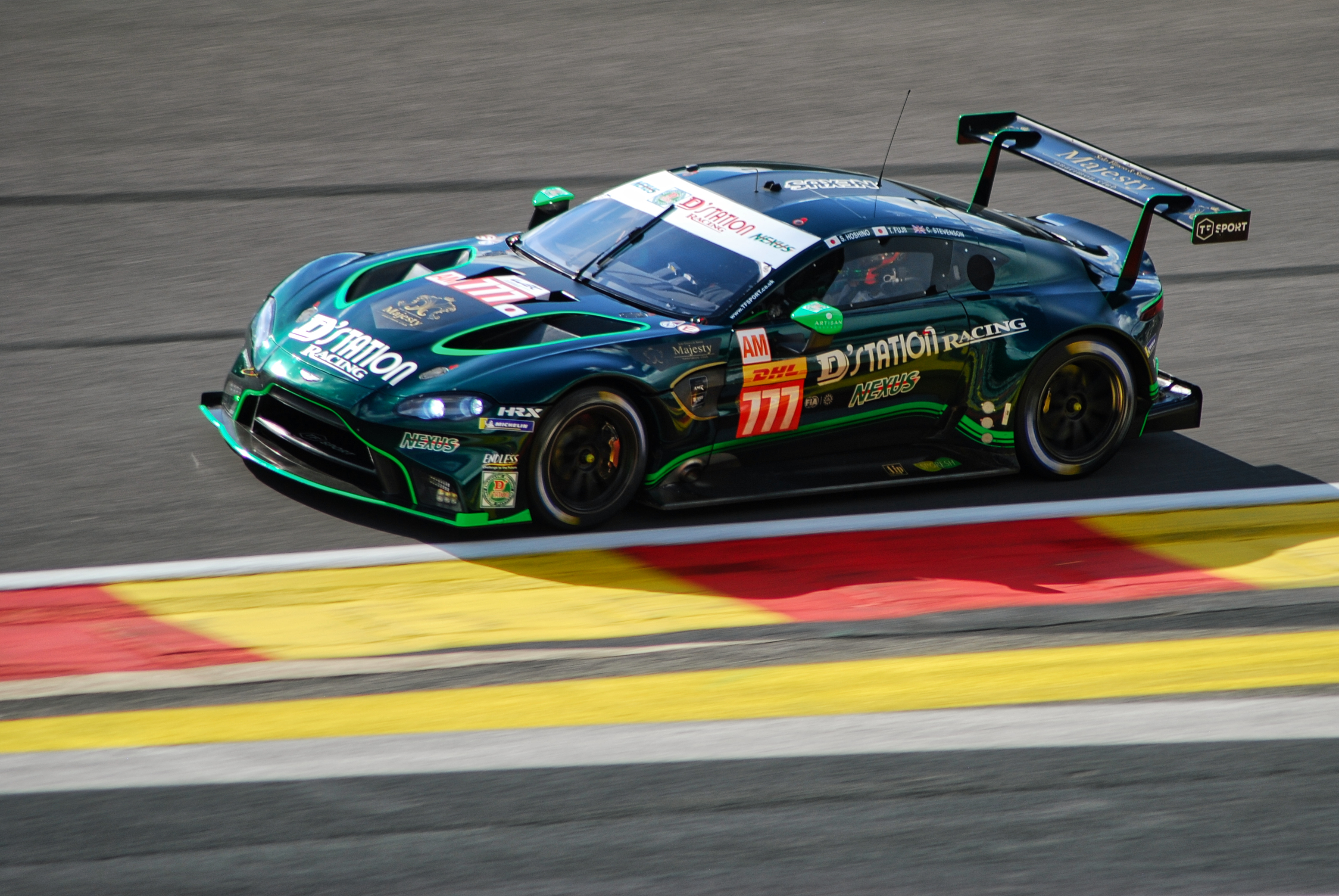
Stevenson's D'station Racing Aston Martin Vantage AMR at the 2023 6 Hours of Spa.

In 2023, Stevenson moved to Aston Martin Racing to make his debut in the FIA World Endurance Championship, driving for the TF Sport-operated D'station Racing team in the GTE Am class alongside Satoshi Hoshino and Tomonobu Fujii. He finished second in the last race of the FIA World Endurance Championship in the 8 Hours of Bahrain. Stevenson was commended for his final stints which saw him close a thirty three second gap to the leader to just 1.6 seconds leading to a tight battle for victory in the closing laps.

Stevenson also notably finished third in the Spa 24 Hours in the Pro-Am class in early July.

=== 2024: European Le Mans Series & GT World Challenge Europe ===
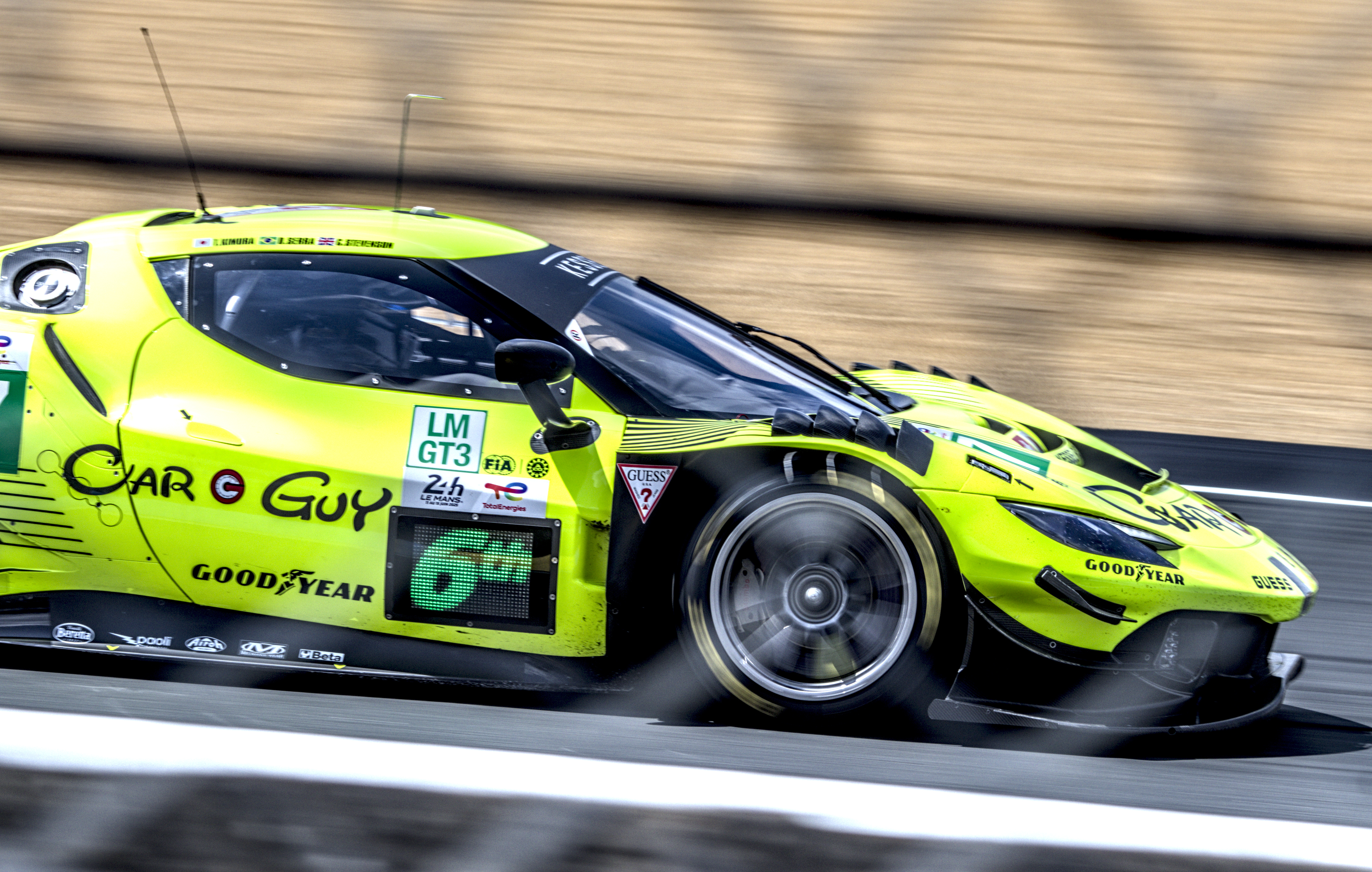
Stevenson's Kessel Racing Ferrari 296 GT3 at the 2025 24 Hours of Le Mans.

For 2024, Stevenson stayed with Aston Martin Racing to compete in the European Le Mans Series with partner team Racing Spirit of Léman. He also entered the GT World Challenge Europe Endurance Cup with the successful British team Barwell Motorsport.

At the halfway point of the European Le Mans Series, Stevenson and his teammates Derek De Boer and Valentin Hasse-Clot sat second in the championship with two podiums in the opening three races.

In the GT World Challenge Europe Endurance Cup campaign, Stevenson and his teammates finished on the podium in the historic centenary edition of the Spa 24 Hours in the competitive Bronze Cup category. Finishing 14th overall out of the 66 car grid.

== Personal life ==
Stevenson has mild cerebral palsy. This affected him in his single-seater career, most notably facing mobility problems in the Tatuus F3 T-318, which led to his switch from the Formula Regional European Championship to Euroformula in 2021.

== Racing record ==
=== Racing career summary ===
Season	Series	Team	Races	Wins	Poles	F/Laps	Podiums	Points	Position
2018	Ginetta Junior Winter Championship	N/A	3	0	0	0	0	?	?
2019	Ginetta Junior Championship	Richardson Racing	26	0	0	0	9	427	6th
2020	F4 British Championship	Argenti Motorsport	26	2	2	3	14	328	**3rd**
2021	Euroformula Open Championship	Van Amersfoort Racing	24	2	0	0	4	217	6th
2021	F3 Asian Championship	Evans GP	6	0	0	0	0	0	23rd
2021	Rundstrecken Challenge Nürburgring - VT2	AVIA Racing	1	0	0	0	0	6.56	NC†
2022	GT World Challenge Europe Endurance Cup	AKKodis ASP Team	5	0	0	0	0	4	32nd
2022	GT World Challenge Europe Endurance Cup - Silver	AKKodis ASP Team	5	0	0	0	1	33	9th
2022	GT World Challenge Europe Sprint Cup	AKKodis ASP Team	10	0	0	0	0	12	13th
2022	GT World Challenge Europe Sprint Cup - Silver	AKKodis ASP Team	10	0	0	0	7	88	**2nd**
2022	Gulf 12 Hours - GT3 Pro-Am	2 Seas Motorsport	1	0	0	1	1	N/A	**3rd**
2023	FIA World Endurance Championship - LMGTE Am	D'station Racing	7	0	0	0	1	31	14th
2023	24 Hours of Le Mans - LMGTE Am	D'station Racing	1	0	0	0	0	N/A	DNF
2023	Super Taikyu - ST-1	D'station Racing	1	0	1	0	1	151.5‡	**2nd‡**
2023	GT World Challenge Europe Endurance Cup - Pro-Am	CSA Racing	1	0	0	0	1	0	NC
2023	GT Cup Championship - Group GT3	7TSIX	4	0	1	0	2	0	NC
2023–24	Asian Le Mans Series - GT	D'station Racing	5	0	0	0	0	0	33rd
2024	European Le Mans Series - GT3	Racing Spirit of Léman	6	0	1	0	2	66	**3rd**
2024	GT World Challenge Europe Endurance Cup	Barwell Motorsport	5	0	0	0	0	0	NC
2024	GT World Challenge Europe Endurance Cup - Bronze	Barwell Motorsport	5	0	0	0	1	30	15th
2024	24H Series - GT3	Juta Racing	1	0	0	0	0	20	29th
2024	Gulf 12 Hours - GT3 Am	HAAS RT	1	0	0	0	1	N/A	**2nd**
2024–25	Asian Le Mans Series - GT	CarGuy Racing	4	0	0	0	0	9	20th
2025	IMSA SportsCar Championship - GTD	Heart of Racing Team	10	1	2	2	4	2898	**3rd**
2025	24 Hours of Le Mans - LMGT3	Kessel Racing	1	0	0	0	0	N/A	8th
2026	IMSA SportsCar Championship - GTD	DragonSpeed	7	0	1	0	0	1544	17th
2026	IMSA SportsCar Championship - GTD Pro	DragonSpeed	1	0	0	0	0	268	36th
2026	Eurocup-3	Tecnicar by Amtog	2	0	0	0	0	0	29th
2026	GT World Challenge Europe Endurance Cup	JMW Motorsport	1	0	0	0	0	0	NC†

^{†} As Stevenson was a guest driver, he was ineligible for a championship position.
^{‡} Team standings.
* Season still in progress.

=== Complete Ginetta Junior Championship results ===
(key) (Races in bold indicate pole position) (Races in italics indicate fastest lap)

Year	Team	1	2	3	4	5	6	7	8	9	10	11	12	13	14	15	16	17	18	19	20	21	22	23	24	25	26	27	DC	Points
2019	Richardson Racing	BHI; 1; 7	BHI; 2 Ret	DON; 1; 7	DON; 2; 7	DON; 3; 9	THR1; 1; 10	THR1; 2; 3	CRO; 1 C	CRO; 2; 3	OUL; 1; 3	OUL; 2; 3	SNE; 1; 2	SNE; 2; 3	SNE; 3; 2	SNE; 4; 14	THR2; 1; 6	THR2; 2; 4	THR2; 3; 4	KNO; 1; 2	KNO; 2; 3	KNO; 3; 10	SIL; 1; 10	SIL; 2; 21	SIL; 3; 12	BHGP; 1 Ret	BHGP; 2; 10	BHGP; 3; 8	6th	427

=== Complete F4 British Championship results ===
(key) (Races in bold indicate pole position) (Races in italics indicate fastest lap)

Year	Team	1	2	3	4	5	6	7	8	9	10	11	12	13	14	15	16	17	18	19	20	21	22	23	24	25	26	DC	Points
2020	Argenti Motorsport	DON; 1; 7	DON; 2; 2	DON; 3; 6	BHGP; 1; 7	BHGP; 2; 7	BHGP; 3; 6	OUL; 1; 3	OUL; 2; 2	OUL; 3; 9	KNO; 1; 3	KNO; 2; 4	KNO; 3; 2	THR; 1; 2	THR; 2; 2	THR; 3; 3	SIL; 1; 3	SIL; 2; 3	SIL; 3; 1	**CRO**; **1**; 2	**CRO**; **2**; 1	SNE; 1; 5	SNE; 2; 2	SNE; 3; 4	BHI; 1; 11	BHI; 2; 8	BHI; 3; 7	3rd	328

=== Complete F3 Asian Championship results ===
(key) (Races in bold indicate pole position) (Races in italics indicate the fastest lap of top ten finishers)

Year	Entrant	1	2	3	4	5	6	7	8	9	10	11	12	13	14	15	DC	Points
2021	Evans GP	DUB; 1; 17	DUB; 2; 16	DUB; 3; 16	ABU; 1; 13	ABU; 2 Ret	ABU; 3 Ret	ABU; 1	ABU; 2	ABU; 3	DUB; 1	DUB; 2	DUB; 3	ABU; 1	ABU; 2	ABU; 3	23rd	0

=== Complete Euroformula Open Championship results ===
(key) (Races in bold indicate pole position; races in italics indicate points for the fastest lap of top ten finishers)

Year	Entrant	1	2	3	4	5	6	7	8	9	10	11	12	13	14	15	16	17	18	19	20	21	22	23	24	DC	Points
2021	Van Amersfoort Racing	POR; 1; 5	POR; 2; 3	POR; 3; 6	LEC; 1; 5	LEC; 2; 4	LEC; 3; 8	SPA; 1; 3	SPA; 2; 5	SPA; 3; 5	HUN; 1; 5	HUN; 2; 1	HUN; 3; 5	IMO; 1; 12	IMO; 2; 6	IMO; 3; 8	RBR; 1; 8	RBR; 2; 7	RBR; 3; 5	MNZ; 1; 6	MNZ; 2; 1	MNZ; 3; 10	CAT; 1; 9	CAT; 2; 8	CAT; 3; 9	6th	214

=== Complete GT World Challenge Europe Endurance Cup results ===
(Races in bold indicate pole position) (Races in italics indicate fastest lap)

Year	Team	Car	Class	1	2	3	4	5	6	7	Pos.	Points
2022	AKKodis ASP Team	Mercedes-AMG GT3 Evo	Silver	IMO; Ret	LEC; 8	SPA; 6H; 54	SPA; 12H; 44	SPA; 24H; Ret	HOC; 16	CAT; 22	9th	33
2023	CSA Racing	Audi R8 LMS Evo II	Pro-Am	MNZ	LEC	SPA; 6H; 37	SPA; 12H; 35	SPA; 24H; 35	NÜR	CAT	11th	36
2024	Barwell Motorsport	Lamborghini Huracán GT3 Evo 2	Bronze	LEC; 37	SPA; 6H; 34	SPA; 12H; 18	SPA; 24H; 14	NÜR; 39	MNZ; 37	JED; 29	15th	30
2026	JMW Motorsport	Ferrari 296 GT3 Evo	Gold	LEC	MNZ	SPA; 6H	SPA; 12H	SPA; 24H	NÜR	ALG; 17	NC‡	0‡

=== Complete GT World Challenge Europe Sprint Cup results ===
(key) (Races in bold indicate pole position) (Races in italics indicate fastest lap)

Year	Team	Car	Class	1	2	3	4	5	6	7	8	9	10	Pos.	Points
2022	AKKodis ASP Team	Mercedes-AMG GT3 Evo	Silver	BRH; 1; 8	BRH; 2; 11	MAG; 1; 8	MAG; 2; 12	ZAN; 1; 7	ZAN; 2; 14	MIS; 1; 9	MIS; 2; 16	VAL; 1; 8	VAL; 2; 8	2nd	88

=== Complete FIA World Endurance Championship results ===
(key) (Races in bold indicate pole position) (Races in italics indicate fastest lap)

Year	Entrant	Class	Car	Engine	1	2	3	4	5	6	7	Rank	Pts
2023	D'station Racing	LMGTE Am	Aston Martin Vantage AMR	Aston Martin 4.0 L Turbo V8	SEB; 10	PRT; NC	SPA; 10	LMS; Ret	MNZ; Ret	FUJ; 10	BHR; 2	14th	31

^{*} Season still in progress.

=== Complete 24 Hours of Le Mans results ===
Year	Team	Co-Drivers	Car	Class	Laps	Pos.	Class Pos.
2023	(Japan) D'station Racing	(Japan) Tomonobu Fujii (Japan) Satoshi Hoshino	Aston Martin Vantage AMR	GTE; Am	163	DNF	DNF
2025	(Switzerland) Kessel Racing	(Japan) Takeshi Kimura (Brazil) Daniel Serra	Ferrari 296 GT3	LMGT3	339	40th	8th

=== Complete Asian Le Mans Series results ===
(key) (Races in bold indicate pole position) (Races in italics indicate fastest lap)

Year	Team	Class	Car	Engine	1	2	3	4	5	6	Pos.	Points
2023–24	D'station Racing	GT	Aston Martin Vantage AMR GT3	Aston Martin M177 4.0 L Turbo V8	SEP; 1; 16	SEP; 2; 17	DUB; Ret	ABU; 1; 19	ABU; 2; 13		33rd	0
2024–25	CarGuy Racing	GT	Ferrari 296 GT3	Ferrari F163 3.0 L Turbo V6	SEP; 1	SEP; 2	DUB; 1; 11	DUB; 2; 11	ABU; 1 Ret	ABU; 2; 6	20th	9

=== Complete European Le Mans Series results ===
(key) (Races in bold indicate pole position; results in italics indicate fastest lap)

Year	Entrant	Class	Chassis	Engine	1	2	3	4	5	6	Rank	Points
2024	Racing Spirit of Léman	LMGT3	Aston Martin Vantage AMR GT3 Evo	Aston Martin M177 4.0 L Turbo V8	CAT; 6	LEC; 3	IMO; 2	SPA; 4	**MUG**; 5	ALG; 9	3rd	66

^{*} Season still in progress.

=== Complete IMSA SportsCar Championship results ===
(key) (Races in bold indicate pole position; results in italics indicate fastest lap)

Year	Team	Class	Make	Engine	1	2	3	4	5	6	7	8	9	10	11	Pos.	Points
2025	Heart of Racing Team	GTD	Aston Martin Vantage AMR GT3 Evo	Aston Martin M177 4.0 L Turbo V8	DAY; 3	SEB; 3	LBH; 9	LGA; 12	**WGL**; 1	MOS; 5	ELK; 9	VIR; 3	**IMS**; 11	PET; 4		3rd	2898
2026	DragonSpeed	GTD	Chevrolet Corvette Z06 GT3.R	Chevrolet LT6.R 5.5 L V8	DAY; 16	SEB; 15	LBH	LGA		WGL; 16	MOS; 10	ELK; 4	**VIR**; 11	IMS; 4		17th	1544
2026	DragonSpeed	GTD Pro	Chevrolet Corvette Z06 GT3.R	Chevrolet LT6.R 5.5 L V8					DET						PET; 6	36th	268

^{*} Season still in progress.

=== Complete Eurocup-3 results ===
(key) (Races in bold indicate pole position; races in italics indicate fastest lap)

Year	Team	1	2	3	4	5	6	7	8	9	10	11	12	13	14	15	16	17	18	19	Pos	Points
2026	Tecnicar by Amtog	LEC; 1	LEC; SR	LEC; 2	POR; 1; 15	POR; 2; 13	IMO; 1	IMO; SR	IMO; 2	MNZ; 1	MNZ; 2	SIL; 1	SIL; 2	JER; 1	JER; SPR	JER; 2	HUN; 1	HUN; 2	CAT; 1	CAT; 2	29th	0

Sporting positions
Preceded by Niklas Krütten	Euroformula Open Championship; Rookies' Champion; 2021	Succeeded by Vladislav Lomko
