= January 2022 Gulf 12 Hours =

11th Gulf 12 Hours endurance race

Race details
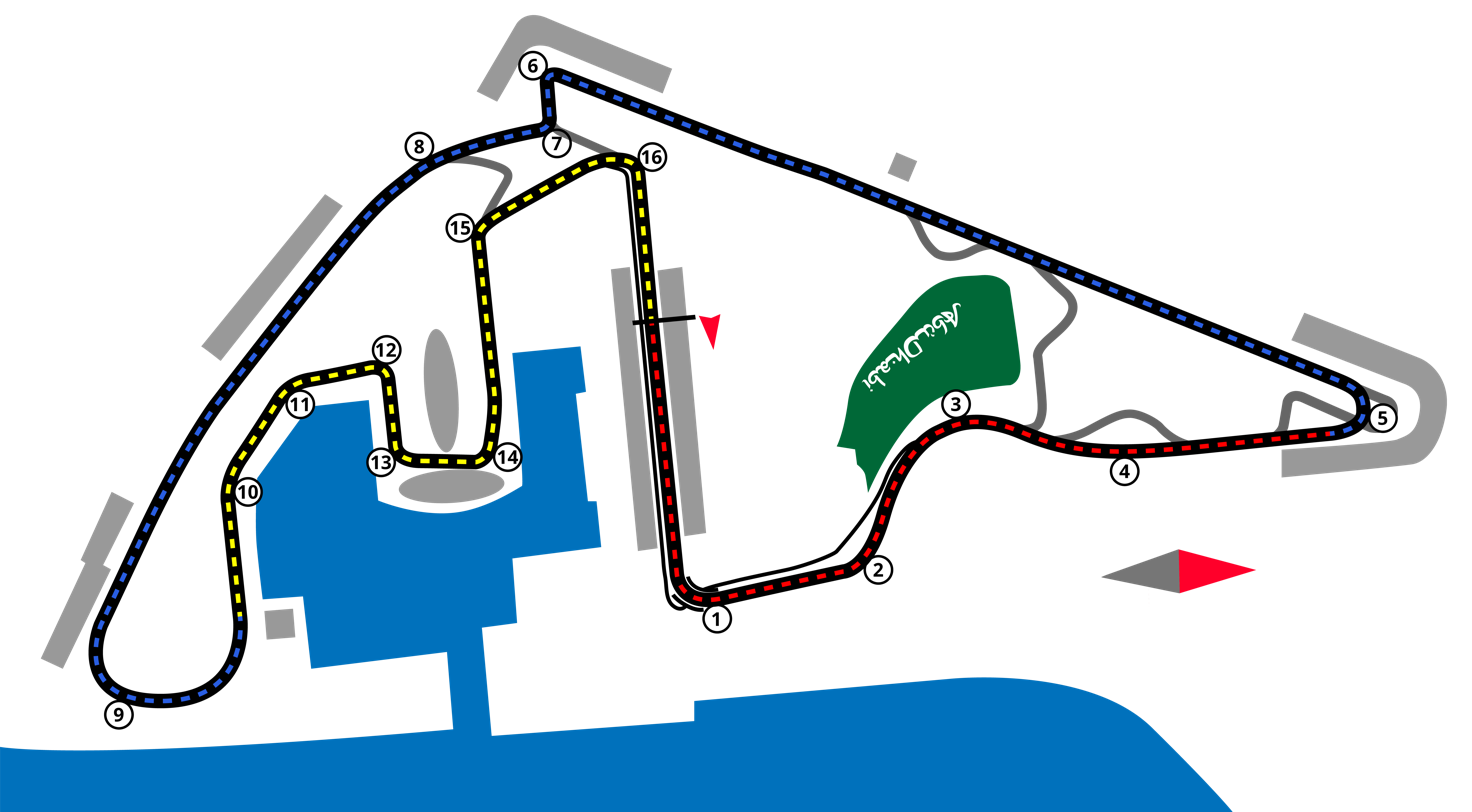
| Date | 8 January 2022 |
| Official name | Gulf 12 Hours |
| Location | Yas Island, Abu Dhabi, UAE |
| Course | Permanent circuit 5.281 km (3.281 mi) |
| Distance | Race; 12 hours |
- Qualifying

Pole
| Driver | (United Kingdom) Ben Barnicoat | 2 Seas Motorsport |
| Time | 1:52.047 |
- Race After 6 Hours

Fastest lap
| Driver | (United Kingdom) Casper Stevenson | 2 Seas Motorsport |
| Time | 1:52.045 (on lap 121) |

Podium
| First | (Bahrain) Isa Al-Khalifa (United Kingdom) Ben Barnicoat (Croatia) Martin Kodrić | 2 Seas Motorsport |
| Second | (United Kingdom) Ian Loggie (United Kingdom) Morgan Tillbrook (United Kingdom) Casper Stevenson | 2 Seas Motorsport |
| Third | (Italy) Alessandro Cozzi (Italy) Giorgio Sernagiotto (Italy) Edward Cheever (Lebanon) Tani Hanna | AF Corse |
- Race After 12 Hours

Fastest lap
| Driver | (Belgium) Dries Vanthoor | Attempto Racing |
| Time | 1:52.194 (on lap 25) |

Podium
| First | (Bahrain) Isa Al-Khalifa (United Kingdom) Ben Barnicoat (Croatia) Martin Kodrić | 2 Seas Motorsport |
| Second | (Germany) Valentin Pierburg (Austria) Dominik Baumann (Switzerland) Christoph Lenz | SPS automotive performance |
| Third | (Italy) David Fumanelli (Italy) Luca Marini (Italy) Alessio Salucci | Monster VR46 Kessel Racing |

The 2022 Gulf 12 Hours was the 11th edition of the Gulf 12 Hours, and was held at Yas Marina Circuit on 8 January 2022. The race was contested with GT3-spec cars and GT4-spec cars.

== Teams and drivers ==
| Team | Car | Engine | No. | Drivers | Class |
GT3
| (Bahrain) 2 Seas Motorsport | Mercedes-AMG GT3 Evo | Mercedes-AMG M159 6.2 L V8 | 1 | (Bahrain) Isa Al Khalifa | P |
| (Bahrain) 2 Seas Motorsport | Mercedes-AMG GT3 Evo | Mercedes-AMG M159 6.2 L V8 | 1 | (United Kingdom) Ben Barnicoat | P |
| (Bahrain) 2 Seas Motorsport | Mercedes-AMG GT3 Evo | Mercedes-AMG M159 6.2 L V8 | 1 | (Croatia) Martin Kodrić | P |
| (Bahrain) 2 Seas Motorsport | Mercedes-AMG GT3 Evo | Mercedes-AMG M159 6.2 L V8 | 66 | (United Kingdom) Ian Loggie | PA |
| (Bahrain) 2 Seas Motorsport | Mercedes-AMG GT3 Evo | Mercedes-AMG M159 6.2 L V8 | 66 | (United Kingdom) Casper Stevenson | PA |
| (Bahrain) 2 Seas Motorsport | Mercedes-AMG GT3 Evo | Mercedes-AMG M159 6.2 L V8 | 66 | (United Kingdom) Morgan Tillbrook | PA |
| (Switzerland) Kessel Racing | Ferrari 488 GT3 Evo 2020 | Ferrari F154CB 3.9 L Turbo V8 | 11 | (Switzerland) Mauro Calamia | PA |
| (Switzerland) Kessel Racing | Ferrari 488 GT3 Evo 2020 | Ferrari F154CB 3.9 L Turbo V8 | 11 | (Switzerland) Stefano Monaco | PA |
| (Switzerland) Kessel Racing | Ferrari 488 GT3 Evo 2020 | Ferrari F154CB 3.9 L Turbo V8 | 11 | (Switzerland) Roberto Pampinini | PA |
| (Switzerland) Kessel Racing | Ferrari 488 GT3 Evo 2020 | Ferrari F154CB 3.9 L Turbo V8 | 33 | (Italy) Murat Cuhadaroglu | Am |
| (Switzerland) Kessel Racing | Ferrari 488 GT3 Evo 2020 | Ferrari F154CB 3.9 L Turbo V8 | 33 | (Italy) Alessandro Tarabini | Am |
| (Switzerland) Kessel Racing | Ferrari 488 GT3 Evo 2020 | Ferrari F154CB 3.9 L Turbo V8 | 33 | (Italy) Erwin Zanotti | Am |
| (Switzerland) Kessel Racing | Ferrari 488 GT3 Evo 2020 | Ferrari F154CB 3.9 L Turbo V8 | 33 | (Italy) Francesco Zollo | Am |
| (Italy) Monster VR46 Kessel Racing | Ferrari 488 GT3 Evo 2020 | Ferrari F154CB 3.9 L Turbo V8 | 46 | (Italy) David Fumanelli | PA |
| (Italy) Monster VR46 Kessel Racing | Ferrari 488 GT3 Evo 2020 | Ferrari F154CB 3.9 L Turbo V8 | 46 | (Italy) Luca Marini | PA |
| (Italy) Monster VR46 Kessel Racing | Ferrari 488 GT3 Evo 2020 | Ferrari F154CB 3.9 L Turbo V8 | 46 | (Italy) Alessio Salucci | PA |
| (Italy) AF Corse | Ferrari 488 GT3 Evo 2020 | Ferrari F154CB 3.9 L Turbo V8 | 51 | (Italy) Alessandro Cozzi | PA |
| (Italy) AF Corse | Ferrari 488 GT3 Evo 2020 | Ferrari F154CB 3.9 L Turbo V8 | 51 | (Italy) Eddie Cheever III | PA |
| (Italy) AF Corse | Ferrari 488 GT3 Evo 2020 | Ferrari F154CB 3.9 L Turbo V8 | 51 | (Italy) Giorgio Sernagiotto | PA |
| (Italy) AF Corse | Ferrari 488 GT3 Evo 2020 | Ferrari F154CB 3.9 L Turbo V8 | 61 | (United States) Trenton Estep | Am |
| (Italy) AF Corse | Ferrari 488 GT3 Evo 2020 | Ferrari F154CB 3.9 L Turbo V8 | 61 | (United States) Conrad Grunewald | Am |
| (Italy) AF Corse | Ferrari 488 GT3 Evo 2020 | Ferrari F154CB 3.9 L Turbo V8 | 61 | (United States) Mark Kvamme | Am |
| (Italy) AF Corse | Ferrari 488 GT3 Evo 2020 | Ferrari F154CB 3.9 L Turbo V8 | 61 | (United States) Jean Claude Saada | Am |
| (France) AKKA ASP Team | Mercedes-AMG GT3 Evo | Mercedes-AMG M159 6.2 L V8 | 64 | (France) Jerome Policand | Am |
| (France) AKKA ASP Team | Mercedes-AMG GT3 Evo | Mercedes-AMG M159 6.2 L V8 | 64 | (France) Benjamin Ricci | Am |
| (France) AKKA ASP Team | Mercedes-AMG GT3 Evo | Mercedes-AMG M159 6.2 L V8 | 64 | (France) Mauro Ricci | Am |
| (Australia) SunEnergy1 Racing | Mercedes-AMG GT3 Evo | Mercedes-AMG M159 6.2 L V8 | 75 | (Germany) Maro Engel | P |
| (Australia) SunEnergy1 Racing | Mercedes-AMG GT3 Evo | Mercedes-AMG M159 6.2 L V8 | 75 | (Canada) Mikaël Grenier | P |
| (Australia) SunEnergy1 Racing | Mercedes-AMG GT3 Evo | Mercedes-AMG M159 6.2 L V8 | 75 | (Australia) Kenny Habul | P |
| (Germany) SPS automotive performance | Mercedes-AMG GT3 Evo | Mercedes-AMG M159 6.2 L V8 | 88 | (Switzerland) Christoph Lenz | PA |
| (Germany) SPS automotive performance | Mercedes-AMG GT3 Evo | Mercedes-AMG M159 6.2 L V8 | 88 | (Germany) Valentin Pierburg | PA |
| (Germany) SPS automotive performance | Mercedes-AMG GT3 Evo | Mercedes-AMG M159 6.2 L V8 | 88 | (Austria) Dominik Baumann | PA |
| (Austria) Baron Motorsport | Ferrari 488 GT3 Evo 2020 | Ferrari F154CB 3.9 L Turbo V8 | 91 | (Austria) Philipp Baron | PA |
| (Austria) Baron Motorsport | Ferrari 488 GT3 Evo 2020 | Ferrari F154CB 3.9 L Turbo V8 | 91 | (Sweden) Tommy Lindroth | PA |
| (Austria) Baron Motorsport | Ferrari 488 GT3 Evo 2020 | Ferrari F154CB 3.9 L Turbo V8 | 91 | (Denmark) Mikkel Mac | PA |
| (Germany) Attempto Racing | Audi R8 LMS Evo | Audi 5.2 L V10 | 99 | (Germany) Alex Aka | P |
| (Germany) Attempto Racing | Audi R8 LMS Evo | Audi 5.2 L V10 | 99 | (Italy) Murod Sultanov | P |
| (Germany) Attempto Racing | Audi R8 LMS Evo | Audi 5.2 L V10 | 99 | (Belgium) Dries Vanthoor | P |
GT4
| (United Kingdom) Century Motorsport | Aston Martin Vantage AMR GT4 | Aston Martin 4.0 L Turbo V8 | 15 | (United Kingdom) Bradley Ellis | |
| (United Kingdom) Century Motorsport | Aston Martin Vantage AMR GT4 | Aston Martin 4.0 L Turbo V8 | 15 | (United Kingdom) David Holloway | |
| (United Kingdom) Century Motorsport | Aston Martin Vantage AMR GT4 | Aston Martin 4.0 L Turbo V8 | 15 | (United Kingdom) Piers Johnson | |
| (United Kingdom) Century Motorsport | BMW M4 GT4 | BMW N55 3.0 L Twin-Turbo I6 | 42 | (Russia) Alex Bukh | |
| (United Kingdom) Century Motorsport | BMW M4 GT4 | BMW N55 3.0 L Twin-Turbo I6 | 42 | (Australia) John Corbett | |
| (United Kingdom) Century Motorsport | BMW M4 GT4 | BMW N55 3.0 L Twin-Turbo I6 | 42 | (Russia) Amir Feyzulin | |
| (United Kingdom) Century Motorsport | BMW M4 GT4 | BMW N55 3.0 L Twin-Turbo I6 | 42 | (Australia) James Winslow | |
| (United Kingdom) Greystone GT | McLaren 570S GT4 | McLaren 3.8 L Turbo V8 | 23 | (United Kingdom) Iain Campbell | |
| (United Kingdom) Greystone GT | McLaren 570S GT4 | McLaren 3.8 L Turbo V8 | 23 | (United Kingdom) Jamie Clarke | |
| (United Kingdom) Greystone GT | McLaren 570S GT4 | McLaren 3.8 L Turbo V8 | 23 | (United Kingdom) Oliver Webb | |

| Icon | Class |
|---|---|
| P | Pro |
| PA | Pro-Am |
| Am | Am |

== Results ==
=== Qualifying ===
Fastest in class in bold.

=== Results after 6 hours ===
Class winners denoted in bold.

| Pos | Class | No. | Team / Entrant | Drivers | Chassis | Laps | Time/Retired |
| Pos | Class | No. | Team / Entrant | Drivers | Engine | Laps | Time/Retired |
|---|---|---|---|---|---|---|---|
| 1 | **GT Pro** | **1** | **(Bahrain) 2 Seas Motorsport** | **(Bahrain) Isa Al-Khalifa** **(United Kingdom) Ben Barnicoat** **(Croatia) Martin Kodrić** | **Mercedes-AMG GT3 Evo** | **177** | **6:01:17.346** |
| 1 | **GT Pro** | **1** | **(Bahrain) 2 Seas Motorsport** | **(Bahrain) Isa Al-Khalifa** **(United Kingdom) Ben Barnicoat** **(Croatia) Martin Kodrić** | **Mercedes-AMG M159 6.2 L V8** | **177** | **6:01:17.346** |
| 2 | **GT Pro-Am** | **66** | **(Bahrain) 2 Seas Motorsport** | **(United Kingdom) Ian Loggie** **(United Kingdom) Morgan Tillbrook** **(United Kingdom) Casper Stevenson** | **Mercedes-AMG GT3 Evo** | **177** | **+4.248** |
| 2 | **GT Pro-Am** | **66** | **(Bahrain) 2 Seas Motorsport** | **(United Kingdom) Ian Loggie** **(United Kingdom) Morgan Tillbrook** **(United Kingdom) Casper Stevenson** | **Mercedes-AMG M159 6.2 L V8** | **177** | **+4.248** |
| 3 | GT Pro-Am | 51 | (Italy) AF Corse | (Italy) Alessandro Cozzi (Italy) Giorgio Sernagiotto (Italy) Edward Cheever (Lebanon) Tani Hanna | Ferrari 488 GT3 | 176 | +1 Lap |
| 3 | GT Pro-Am | 51 | (Italy) AF Corse | (Italy) Alessandro Cozzi (Italy) Giorgio Sernagiotto (Italy) Edward Cheever (Lebanon) Tani Hanna | Ferrari 3.9 L Twin-Turbo V8 | 176 | +1 Lap |
| 4 | GT Pro-Am | 88 | (Germany) SPS automotive performance | (Germany) Valentin Pierburg (Austria) Dominik Baumann (Switzerland) Christoph Lenz | Mercedes-AMG GT3 Evo | 176 | +1 Lap |
| 4 | GT Pro-Am | 88 | (Germany) SPS automotive performance | (Germany) Valentin Pierburg (Austria) Dominik Baumann (Switzerland) Christoph Lenz | Mercedes-AMG M159 6.2 L V8 | 176 | +1 Lap |
| 5 | GT Pro-Am | 46 | (Italy) Monster VR46 Kessel Racing | (Italy) David Fumanelli (Italy) Luca Marini (Italy) Alessio Salucci | Ferrari 488 GT3 | 176 | +1 Lap |
| 5 | GT Pro-Am | 46 | (Italy) Monster VR46 Kessel Racing | (Italy) David Fumanelli (Italy) Luca Marini (Italy) Alessio Salucci | Ferrari 3.9 L Twin-Turbo V8 | 176 | +1 Lap |
| 6 | **GT G** | **64** | **(France) AKKA ASP Team** | **(France) Jérôme Policand** **(France) Mauro Ricci** **(France) Benjamin Ricci** | **Mercedes-AMG GT3 Evo** | **175** | **+2 Laps** |
| 6 | **GT G** | **64** | **(France) AKKA ASP Team** | **(France) Jérôme Policand** **(France) Mauro Ricci** **(France) Benjamin Ricci** | **Mercedes-AMG M159 6.2 L V8** | **175** | **+2 Laps** |
| 7 | GT G | 61 | (Italy) AF Corse | (United States) Jean Claude Saada (United States) Conrad Grunewald (United States) Mark Kvamme (United States) Trenton Estep | Ferrari 488 GT3 | 175 | +2 Laps |
| 7 | GT G | 61 | (Italy) AF Corse | (United States) Jean Claude Saada (United States) Conrad Grunewald (United States) Mark Kvamme (United States) Trenton Estep | Ferrari 3.9 L Twin-Turbo V8 | 175 | +2 Laps |
| 8 | GT Pro-Am | 91 | (Austria) Baron Motorsport | (Sweden) Tommy Lindroth (Austria) Philipp Baron (Denmark) Mikkel Mac | Ferrari 488 GT3 | 174 | +3 Laps |
| 8 | GT Pro-Am | 91 | (Austria) Baron Motorsport | (Sweden) Tommy Lindroth (Austria) Philipp Baron (Denmark) Mikkel Mac | Ferrari 3.9 L Twin-Turbo V8 | 174 | +3 Laps |
| 9 | GT Pro | 75 | (Australia) SunEnergy1 Racing | (Australia) Kenny Habul (Canada) Mikael Grenier (Germany) Maro Engel | Mercedes-AMG GT3 Evo | 172 | +5 Laps |
| 9 | GT Pro | 75 | (Australia) SunEnergy1 Racing | (Australia) Kenny Habul (Canada) Mikael Grenier (Germany) Maro Engel | Mercedes-AMG M159 6.2 L V8 | 172 | +5 Laps |
| 10 | GT G | 33 | (Switzerland) Kessel Racing | (Italy) Murat Cuhadaroglu (Italy) Francesco Zollo (Italy) Erwin Zanotti (Italy) Alessandro Tarabini | Ferrari 488 GT3 | 171 | +6 Laps |
| 10 | GT G | 33 | (Switzerland) Kessel Racing | (Italy) Murat Cuhadaroglu (Italy) Francesco Zollo (Italy) Erwin Zanotti (Italy) Alessandro Tarabini | Ferrari 3.9 L Twin-Turbo V8 | 171 | +6 Laps |
| 11 | **GT4** | **23** | **(United Kingdom) Greystone GT** | **(United Kingdom) Iain Campbell** **(United Kingdom) Oliver Webb** **(United Kingdom) Jamie Clarke** | **McLaren 570S GT4** | **160** | **+17 laps** |
| 11 | **GT4** | **23** | **(United Kingdom) Greystone GT** | **(United Kingdom) Iain Campbell** **(United Kingdom) Oliver Webb** **(United Kingdom) Jamie Clarke** | **McLaren 3.8 L Turbo V8** | **160** | **+17 laps** |
| 12 | GT4 | 15 | (United Kingdom) Century Motorsport | (United Kingdom) Piers Johnson (United Kingdom) David Holloway (United Kingdom) Bradley Ellis | Aston Martin Vantage AMR GT4 | 159 | +18 laps |
| 12 | GT4 | 15 | (United Kingdom) Century Motorsport | (United Kingdom) Piers Johnson (United Kingdom) David Holloway (United Kingdom) Bradley Ellis | Aston Martin 4.0 L Turbo V8 | 159 | +18 laps |
| 13 | GT4 | 42 | (United Kingdom) Century Motorsport | (Russia) Amir Feyzulin (Russia) Alexander Bukhantsov (Australia) John Corbett (Australia) James Winslow | BMW M4 GT4 | 157 | +20 Laps |
| 13 | GT4 | 42 | (United Kingdom) Century Motorsport | (Russia) Amir Feyzulin (Russia) Alexander Bukhantsov (Australia) John Corbett (Australia) James Winslow | BMW BMW N55 3.0 L Twin-Turbo I6 | 157 | +20 Laps |
| 14 | GT3 Pro | 99 | (Germany) Attempto Racing | (Belgium) Dries Vanthoor (Germany) Alex Aka (Italy) Murod Sultanov | Audi R8 LMS Evo | 119 | +58 Laps |
| 14 | GT3 Pro | 99 | (Germany) Attempto Racing | (Belgium) Dries Vanthoor (Germany) Alex Aka (Italy) Murod Sultanov | Audi 5.2 L V10 | 119 | +58 Laps |
| 15 | GT3 Pro-Am | 11 | (Switzerland) Kessel Racing | (Switzerland) Roberto Pampinini (Switzerland) Mauro Calamia (Switzerland) Stefano Monaco | Ferrari 488 GT3 Evo 2020 | 22 | +155 Laps |
| 15 | GT3 Pro-Am | 11 | (Switzerland) Kessel Racing | (Switzerland) Roberto Pampinini (Switzerland) Mauro Calamia (Switzerland) Stefano Monaco | Ferrari F154CB 3.9 L Turbo V8 | 22 | +155 Laps |

=== Final results ===
Class winners denoted in bold.

| Pos | Class | No. | Team / Entrant | Drivers | Chassis | Laps | Time/Retired |
| Pos | Class | No. | Team / Entrant | Drivers | Engine | Laps | Time/Retired |
|---|---|---|---|---|---|---|---|
| 1 | **GT Pro** | **1** | **(Bahrain) 2 Seas Motorsport** | **(Bahrain) Isa Al-Khalifa** **(United Kingdom) Ben Barnicoat** **(Croatia) Martin Kodrić** | **Mercedes-AMG GT3 Evo** | **359** | **6:00:11.590** |
| 1 | **GT Pro** | **1** | **(Bahrain) 2 Seas Motorsport** | **(Bahrain) Isa Al-Khalifa** **(United Kingdom) Ben Barnicoat** **(Croatia) Martin Kodrić** | **Mercedes-AMG M159 6.2 L V8** | **359** | **6:00:11.590** |
| 2 | **GT Pro-Am** | **88** | **(Germany) SPS automotive performance** | **(Germany) Valentin Pierburg** **(Austria) Dominik Baumann** **(Switzerland) Christoph Lenz** | **Mercedes-AMG GT3 Evo** | **358** | **+1 Lap** |
| 2 | **GT Pro-Am** | **88** | **(Germany) SPS automotive performance** | **(Germany) Valentin Pierburg** **(Austria) Dominik Baumann** **(Switzerland) Christoph Lenz** | **Mercedes-AMG M159 6.2 L V8** | **358** | **+1 Lap** |
| 3 | GT Pro-Am | 46 | (Italy) Monster VR46 Kessel Racing | (Italy) David Fumanelli (Italy) Luca Marini (Italy) Alessio Salucci | Ferrari 488 GT3 | 358 | +1 Lap |
| 3 | GT Pro-Am | 46 | (Italy) Monster VR46 Kessel Racing | (Italy) David Fumanelli (Italy) Luca Marini (Italy) Alessio Salucci | Ferrari 3.9 L Twin-Turbo V8 | 358 | +1 Lap |
| 4 | GT Pro-Am | 66 | (Bahrain) 2 Seas Motorsport | (United Kingdom) Ian Loggie (United Kingdom) Morgan Tillbrook (United Kingdom) Casper Stevenson | Mercedes-AMG GT3 Evo | 357 | +2 Laps |
| 4 | GT Pro-Am | 66 | (Bahrain) 2 Seas Motorsport | (United Kingdom) Ian Loggie (United Kingdom) Morgan Tillbrook (United Kingdom) Casper Stevenson | Mercedes-AMG M159 6.2 L V8 | 357 | +2 Laps |
| 5 | GT Pro-Am | 51 | (Italy) AF Corse | (Italy) Alessandro Cozzi (Italy) Giorgio Sernagiotto (Italy) Edward Cheever (Lebanon) Tani Hanna | Ferrari 488 GT3 | 357 | +2 Laps |
| 5 | GT Pro-Am | 51 | (Italy) AF Corse | (Italy) Alessandro Cozzi (Italy) Giorgio Sernagiotto (Italy) Edward Cheever (Lebanon) Tani Hanna | Ferrari 3.9 L Twin-Turbo V8 | 357 | +2 Laps |
| 6 | GT Pro | 75 | (Australia) SunEnergy1 Racing | (Australia) Kenny Habul (Canada) Mikael Grenier (Germany) Maro Engel | Mercedes-AMG GT3 Evo | 355 | +4 Laps |
| 6 | GT Pro | 75 | (Australia) SunEnergy1 Racing | (Australia) Kenny Habul (Canada) Mikael Grenier (Germany) Maro Engel | Mercedes-AMG M159 6.2 L V8 | 355 | +4 Laps |
| 7 | **GT G** | **61** | **(Italy) AF Corse** | **(United States) Jean Claude Saada** **(United States) Conrad Grunewald** **(United States) Mark Kvamme** **(United States) Trenton Estep** | **Ferrari 488 GT3** | **355** | **+4 Laps** |
| 7 | **GT G** | **61** | **(Italy) AF Corse** | **(United States) Jean Claude Saada** **(United States) Conrad Grunewald** **(United States) Mark Kvamme** **(United States) Trenton Estep** | **Ferrari 3.9 L Twin-Turbo V8** | **355** | **+4 Laps** |
| 8 | GT G | 64 | (France) AKKA ASP Team | (France) Jérôme Policand (France) Mauro Ricci (France) Benjamin Ricci | Mercedes-AMG GT3 Evo | 355 | +4 Laps |
| 8 | GT G | 64 | (France) AKKA ASP Team | (France) Jérôme Policand (France) Mauro Ricci (France) Benjamin Ricci | Mercedes-AMG M159 6.2 L V8 | 355 | +4 Laps |
| 9 | GT Pro-Am | 91 | (Austria) Baron Motorsport | (Sweden) Tommy Lindroth (Austria) Philipp Baron (Denmark) Mikkel Mac | Ferrari 488 GT3 | 354 | +5 Laps |
| 9 | GT Pro-Am | 91 | (Austria) Baron Motorsport | (Sweden) Tommy Lindroth (Austria) Philipp Baron (Denmark) Mikkel Mac | Ferrari 3.9 L Twin-Turbo V8 | 354 | +5 Laps |
| 10 | GT G | 33 | (Switzerland) Kessel Racing | (Italy) Murat Cuhadaroglu (Italy) Francesco Zollo (Italy) Erwin Zanotti (Italy) Alessandro Tarabini | Ferrari 488 GT3 | 348 | +11 Laps |
| 10 | GT G | 33 | (Switzerland) Kessel Racing | (Italy) Murat Cuhadaroglu (Italy) Francesco Zollo (Italy) Erwin Zanotti (Italy) Alessandro Tarabini | Ferrari 3.9 L Twin-Turbo V8 | 348 | +11 Laps |
| 11 | **GT4** | **23** | **(United Kingdom) Greystone GT** | **(United Kingdom) Iain Campbell** **(United Kingdom) Oliver Webb** **(United Kingdom) Jamie Clarke** | **McLaren 570S GT4** | **323** | **+36 laps** |
| 11 | **GT4** | **23** | **(United Kingdom) Greystone GT** | **(United Kingdom) Iain Campbell** **(United Kingdom) Oliver Webb** **(United Kingdom) Jamie Clarke** | **McLaren 3.8 L Turbo V8** | **323** | **+36 laps** |
| 12 | GT4 | 15 | (United Kingdom) Century Motorsport | (United Kingdom) Piers Johnson (United Kingdom) David Holloway (United Kingdom) Bradley Ellis | Aston Martin Vantage AMR GT4 | 322 | +37 laps |
| 12 | GT4 | 15 | (United Kingdom) Century Motorsport | (United Kingdom) Piers Johnson (United Kingdom) David Holloway (United Kingdom) Bradley Ellis | Aston Martin 4.0 L Turbo V8 | 322 | +37 laps |
| 13 | GT4 | 42 | (United Kingdom) Century Motorsport | (Russia) Amir Feyzulin (Russia) Alexander Bukhantsov (Australia) John Corbett (Australia) James Winslow | BMW M4 GT4 | 247 | +112 Laps |
| 13 | GT4 | 42 | (United Kingdom) Century Motorsport | (Russia) Amir Feyzulin (Russia) Alexander Bukhantsov (Australia) John Corbett (Australia) James Winslow | BMW BMW N55 3.0 L Twin-Turbo I6 | 247 | +112 Laps |
| 14 | GT3 Pro | 99 | (Germany) Attempto Racing | (Belgium) Dries Vanthoor (Germany) Alex Aka (Italy) Murod Sultanov | Audi R8 LMS Evo | 181 | +178 Laps |
| 14 | GT3 Pro | 99 | (Germany) Attempto Racing | (Belgium) Dries Vanthoor (Germany) Alex Aka (Italy) Murod Sultanov | Audi 5.2 L V10 | 181 | +178 Laps |
| 15 | GT3 Pro-Am | 11 | (Switzerland) Kessel Racing | (Switzerland) Roberto Pampinini (Switzerland) Mauro Calamia (Switzerland) Stefano Monaco | Ferrari 488 GT3 Evo 2020 | 22 | Did not finish |
| 15 | GT3 Pro-Am | 11 | (Switzerland) Kessel Racing | (Switzerland) Roberto Pampinini (Switzerland) Mauro Calamia (Switzerland) Stefano Monaco | Ferrari F154CB 3.9 L Turbo V8 | 22 | Did not finish |
