= 2026 4 Hours of Dubai =

Endurance sportscar racing event

The layout of the Dubai Autodrome

The 2026 4 Hours of Dubai was an endurance sportscar racing event held between 30 January and 1 February 2026 at the Dubai Autodrome in Dubai, United Arab Emirates. It was the third and fourth round of the 2025–26 Asian Le Mans Series season.

== Schedule ==
Date	Time (local: GST)	Event
Friday, 30 January	11:00	Free Practice 1
Friday, 30 January	16:30	Free Practice 2
Saturday, 31 January	09:40	Qualifying – GT
Saturday, 31 January	10:05	Qualifying – LMP3
Saturday, 31 January	10:30	Qualifying – LMP2
Saturday, 31 January	14:10	Race 1
Sunday, 1 February	14:10	Race 2

Asian Le Mans Series
Previous race: 4 Hours of Sepang	2025–26 season	Next race: 4 Hours of Abu Dhabi
