= 2024 4 Hours of Le Castellet =

Endurance sportscar racing event

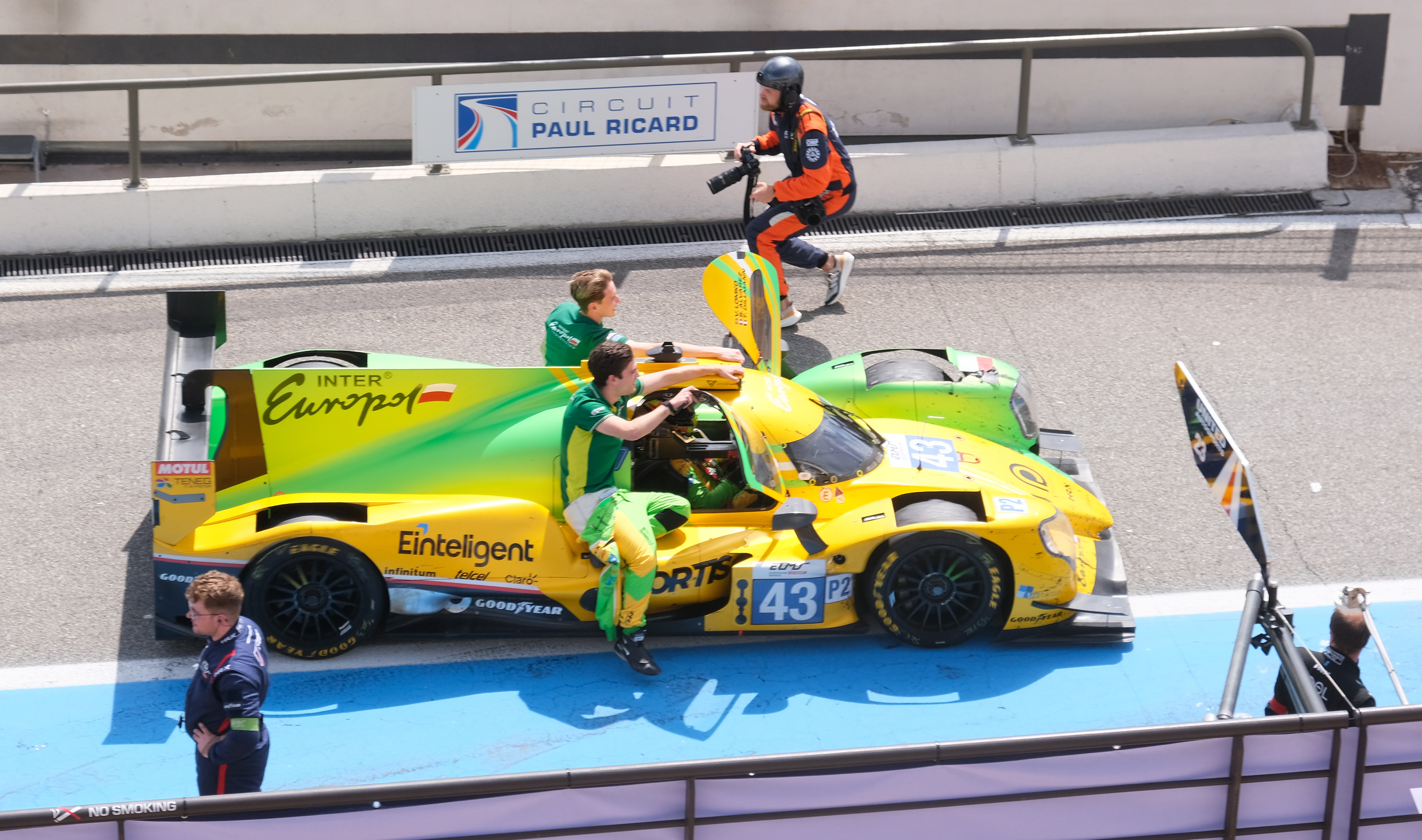
Race winners.

The layout of the Circuit Paul Ricard

The 2024 4 Hours of Le Castellet was an endurance sportscar racing event held between 3 and 5 May 2024, as the second round of the 2024 European Le Mans Series season.

== Entry list ==
The pre-event entry list consisted of 43 entries between 4 categories - 14 in LMP2, 8 in LMP2 Pro/Am, 10 in LMP3 and 11 in LMGT3.

It was another ELMS round missed by Ferdinand Habsburg as the result of a crash at MotorLand Aragón. As in Barcelona Paul-Loup Chatin replaced Habsburg in the No. 47 COOL Racing. Eric Trouillet replaced Alexandre Yvon in the No. 35 Ultimate. Nicolás Varrone replaced Ulysse de Pauw in the No. 51 AF Corse.

== Schedule ==
Date	Time (local: CEST)	Event
Friday, 3 May	11:50	Free Practice 1
Friday, 3 May	16:35	Bronze Drivers Collective Test
Saturday, 4 May	10:10	Free Practice 2
Saturday, 4 May	14:40	Qualifying - LMGT3
Saturday, 4 May	15:05	Qualifying - LMP3
Saturday, 4 May	15:30	Qualifying - LMP2 Pro-Am
Saturday, 4 May	15:55	Qualifying - LMP2
Sunday, 5 May	11:30	Race

== Free practice ==
- Only the fastest car in each class is shown.

Free Practice 1	Class	No.	Entrant	Time
Free Practice 1	LMP2	37	(Switzerland) COOL Racing	1:41.186
Free Practice 1	LMP2 Pro/Am	83	(Italy) AF Corse	1:41.969
Free Practice 1	LMP3	4	(Luxembourg) DKR Engineering	1:49.545
Free Practice 1	LMGT3	60	(Germany) Proton Competition	1:55.257
Free Practice 2	Class	No.	Entrant	Time
Free Practice 2	LMP2	9	(Germany) Iron Lynx – Proton	1:41.362
Free Practice 2	LMP2 Pro/Am	83	(Italy) AF Corse	1:42.154
Free Practice 2	LMP3	15	(United Kingdom) RLR M Sport	1:50.189
Free Practice 2	LMGT3	55	(Switzerland) Spirit of Race	1:54.892

== Qualifying ==
Pole position winners in each class are marked in bold.

Pos	Class	No.	Team	Driver	Time	Gap	Grid
1	**LMP2**	**28**	**(France) IDEC Sport**	**(Netherlands) Job van Uitert**	**1:40.104**	—	1
2	LMP2	14	(United States) AO by TF	(Switzerland) Louis Delétraz	1:40.350	+0.246	2
3	LMP2	9	(Germany) Iron Lynx – Proton	(Italy) Matteo Cairoli	1:40.365	+0.261	3
4	LMP2	47	(Switzerland) COOL Racing	(Denmark) Frederik Vesti	1:40.382	+0.278	4
5	LMP2	22	(United Kingdom) United Autosports	(United Kingdom) Benjamin Hanley	1:40.559	+0.455	5
6	LMP2	37	(Switzerland) COOL Racing	(Denmark) Malthe Jakobsen	1:40.703	+0.599	6
7	LMP2	27	(United Kingdom) Nielsen Racing	(United Kingdom) Will Stevens	1:40.775	+0.671	7
8	LMP2	30	(France) Duqueine Team	(Australia) James Allen	1:40.862	+0.758	8
9	LMP2	65	(France) Panis Racing	(France) Charles Milesi	1:40.900	+0.796	9
10	LMP2	10	(United Kingdom) Vector Sport	(Brazil) Felipe Drugovich	1:40.931	+0.827	10
11	LMP2	34	(Poland) Inter Europol Competition	(France) Clément Novalak	1:41.013	+0.909	11
12	LMP2	43	(Poland) Inter Europol Competition	(France) Tom Dillmann	1:41.126	+1.022	12
13	LMP2	25	(Portugal) Algarve Pro Racing	(United Kingdom) Olli Caldwell	1:41.135	+1.031	13
14	LMP2	23	(United Kingdom) United Autosports	(United Kingdom) Paul di Resta	1:41.651	+1.547	14
15	**LMP2 Pro/Am**	**77**	**(Germany) Proton Competition**	**(Italy) Giorgio Roda**	**1:43.067**	**+2.963**	15
16	LMP2 Pro/Am	83	(Italy) AF Corse	(France) François Perrodo	1:43.445	+3.341	16
17	LMP2 Pro/Am	29	(France) Richard Mille by TDS	(United States) Rodrigo Sales	1:43.672	+3.568	17
18	LMP2 Pro/Am	24	(United Kingdom) Nielsen Racing	(United States) John Falb	1:43.759	+3.655	18
19	LMP2 Pro/Am	21	(United Kingdom) United Autosports	(Brazil) Daniel Schneider	1:44.803	+4.699	19
20	LMP2 Pro/Am	19	(Poland) Team Virage	(United Kingdom) Anthony Wells	1:44.987	+4.883	20
21	LMP2 Pro/Am	20	(Portugal) Algarve Pro Racing	(Greece) Kriton Lendoudis	1:45.925	+5.821	21
22	LMP2 Pro/Am	3	(Luxembourg) DKR Engineering	(Australia) Andres Latorre Canon	1:46.581	+6.477	22
23	**LMP3**	**15**	**(United Kingdom) RLR M Sport**	**(France) Gaël Julien**	**1:48.867**	**+8.763**	23
24	LMP3	17	(Switzerland) COOL Racing	(Portugal) Manuel Espírito Santo	1:48.991	+8.887	24
25	LMP3	8	(Poland) Team Virage	(France) Gillian Henrion	1:49.168	+9.064	25
26	LMP3	12	(Germany) WTM by Rinaldi Racing	(Colombia) Óscar Tunjo	1:49.214	+9.110	26
27	LMP3	31	(Switzerland) Racing Spirit of Léman	(France) Antoine Doquin	1:49.292	+9.188	27
28	LMP3	88	(Poland) Inter Europol Competition	(Portugal) Pedro Perino	1:49.451	+9.347	28
29	LMP3	4	(Luxembourg) DKR Engineering	(United States) Wyatt Brichacek	1:49.665	+9.561	29
30	LMP3	11	(Italy) Eurointernational	(Canada) Adam Ali	1:50.001	+9.897	30
31	LMP3	35	(France) Ultimate	(France) Matthieu Lahaye	1:50.046	+9.942	31
32	LMP3	5	(United Kingdom) RLR M Sport	(Canada) Daniel Ali	1:51.084	+10.980	32
33	**LMGT3**	**85**	**(Germany) Iron Dames**	**(Belgium) Sarah Bovy**	**1:56.003**	**+15.899**	33
34	LMGT3	55	(Switzerland) Spirit of Race	(United Kingdom) Duncan Cameron	1:56.283	+16.179	34
35	LMGT3	63	(Italy) Iron Lynx	(Japan) Hiroshi Hamaguchi	1:56.619	+16.515	35
36	LMGT3	59	(Switzerland) Racing Spirit of Léman	(United States) Derek DeBoer	1:56.898	+16.794	36
37	LMGT3	57	(Switzerland) Kessel Racing	(Japan) Takeshi Kimura	1:56.942	+16.838	37
38	LMGT3	50	(Denmark) Formula Racing	(Denmark) Johnny Laursen	1:57.431	+17.327	38
39	LMGT3	97	(United Kingdom) Grid Motorsport by TF	(Singapore) Martin Berry	1:57.456	+17.352	39
40	LMGT3	86	(United Kingdom) GR Racing	(United Kingdom) Michael Wainwright	1:57.588	+17.484	40
41	LMGT3	51	(Italy) AF Corse	(France) Charles-Henri Samani	1:58.218	+18.114	41
42	LMGT3	60	(Germany) Proton Competition	(Italy) Claudio Schiavoni	1:58.943	+18.839	42
43	LMGT3	66	(United Kingdom) JMW Motorsport	(United Kingdom) John Hartshorne	2:00.742	+20.638	43

== Race ==
=== Race result ===
The minimum number of laps for classification (70% of overall winning car's distance) was 87 laps. Class winners are marked in bold.

Final Classification
Pos	Class	No	Team	Drivers	Car	Tyres	Laps	Time/Gap
1	**LMP2**	**43**	**(Poland) Inter Europol Competition**	**(Mexico) Sebastián Álvarez (France) Vladislav Lomko (France) Tom Dillmann**	**Oreca 07**	G	**125**	**4:00:47.885**
2	LMP2	47	(Switzerland) COOL Racing	(Mexico) Alejandro García (France) Paul-Loup Chatin (Denmark) Frederik Vesti	Oreca 07	G	125	+14.004
3	LMP2	14	(United States) AO by TF	(United Kingdom) Jonny Edgar (Switzerland) Louis Delétraz (Poland) Robert Kubica	Oreca 07	G	125	+15.078
4	LMP2	28	(France) IDEC Sport	(France) Paul Lafargue (France) Reshad de Gerus (Netherlands) Job van Uitert	Oreca 07	G	125	+20.325 (Note: The No. 28 IDEC Sport was penalised for weaving on the Mistral straight and causing a contact. The penalty was 10 seconds time penalty.)
5	LMP2	22	(United Kingdom) United Autosports	(Romania) Filip Ugran (Japan) Marino Sato (United Kingdom) Benjamin Hanley	Oreca 07	G	125	+20.353
6	LMP2	30	(France) Duqueine Team	(Netherlands) Niels Koolen (France) Jean-Baptiste Simmenauer (Australia) James Allen	Oreca 07	G	125	+24.186
7	**LMP2 Pro/Am**	**29**	**(France) Richard Mille by TDS**	**(United States) Rodrigo Sales (France) Mathias Beche (Switzerland) Grégoire Saucy**	**Oreca 07**	G	**125**	**+34.149**
8	LMP2	25	(Portugal) Algarve Pro Racing	(Liechtenstein) Matthias Kaiser (United Kingdom) Olli Caldwell (United Kingdom) Alexander Lynn	Oreca 07	G	125	+34.846
9	LMP2 Pro/Am	77	(Germany) Proton Competition	(Italy) Giorgio Roda (Austria) René Binder (Netherlands) Bent Viscaal	Oreca 07	G	125	+45.906
10	LMP2 Pro/Am	21	(United Kingdom) United Autosports	(Brazil) Daniel Schneider (United Kingdom) Andrew Meyrick (United Kingdom) Oliver Jarvis	Oreca 07	G	125	+59.338
11	LMP2 Pro/Am	83	(Italy) AF Corse	(France) François Perrodo (France) Matthieu Vaxivière (Italy) Alessio Rovera	Oreca 07	G	125	+1:03.816
12	LMP2	65	(France) Panis Racing	(United Kingdom) Manuel Maldonado (France) Charles Milesi (Monaco) Arthur Leclerc	Oreca 07	G	125	+1:21.952
13	LMP2 Pro/Am	24	(United Kingdom) Nielsen Racing	(United States) John Falb (United Kingdom) Colin Noble (Spain) Albert Costa Balboa	Oreca 07	G	125	+1:30.041
14	LMP2	9	(Germany) Iron Lynx – Proton	(Germany) Jonas Ried (France) Macéo Capietto (Italy) Matteo Cairoli	Oreca 07	G	125	+1:34.810
15	LMP2	10	(United Kingdom) Vector Sport	(United Kingdom) Ryan Cullen (Monaco) Stéphane Richelmi (Brazil) Felipe Drugovich	Oreca 07	G	124	+1 Lap
16	LMP2	27	(United Kingdom) Nielsen Racing	(Denmark) David Heinemeier Hansson (Chile) Nicolás Pino (United Kingdom) Will Stevens	Oreca 07	G	124	+1 Lap
17	LMP2	23	(United Kingdom) United Autosports	(United States) Bijoy Garg (Switzerland) Fabio Scherer (United Kingdom) Paul di Resta	Oreca 07	G	124	+1 Lap
18	LMP2 Pro/Am	20	(Portugal) Algarve Pro Racing	(Greece) Kriton Lendoudis (United Kingdom) Richard Bradley (United Kingdom) Alex Quinn	Oreca 07	G	124	+1 Lap
19	LMP2 Pro/Am	19	(Poland) Team Virage	(United Kingdom) Anthony Wells (United Kingdom) Matthew Bell (Brazil) Nelson Piquet Jr.	Oreca 07	G	124	+1 Lap
20	LMP2 Pro/Am	3	(Luxembourg) DKR Engineering	(Australia) Andres Latorre Canon (Turkey) Cem Bölükbaşı (Germany) Laurents Hörr	Oreca 07	G	122	+3 Laps
21	**LMP3**	**15**	**(United Kingdom) RLR M Sport**	**(Denmark) Michael Jensen (United Kingdom) Nick Adcock (France) Gaël Julien**	**Ligier JS P320**	MI	**118**	**+7 Laps**
22	LMP3	4	(Luxembourg) DKR Engineering	(Germany) Alexander Mattschull (Spain) Belén García (United States) Wyatt Brichacek	Duqueine M30 - D08	MI	118	+7 Laps
23	LMP3	35	(France) Ultimate	(France) Eric Trouillet (France) Jean-Baptiste Lahaye (France) Matthieu Lahaye	Ligier JS P320	MI	117	+8 Laps
24	LMP3	11	(Italy) Eurointernational	(United Kingdom) Matthew Richard Bell (Canada) Adam Ali	Ligier JS P320	MI	117	+8 Laps
25	LMP3	17	(Switzerland) COOL Racing	(Portugal) Miguel Cristóvão (Switzerland) Cédric Oltramare (Portugal) Manuel Espírito Santo	Ligier JS P320	MI	117	+8 Laps
26	LMP3	31	(Switzerland) Racing Spirit of Léman	(France) Jacques Wolff (France) Jean-Ludovic Foubert (France) Antoine Doquin	Ligier JS P320	MI	117	+8 Laps
27	LMP3	8	(Poland) Team Virage	(Algeria) Julien Gerbi (Portugal) Bernardo Pinheiro (France) Gillian Henrion	Ligier JS P320	MI	116	+9 Laps
28	LMP3	5	(United Kingdom) RLR M Sport	(Canada) James Dayson (Canada) Daniel Ali (United Kingdom) Bailey Voisin	Ligier JS P320	MI	115	+10 Laps
29	**LMGT3**	**55**	**(Switzerland) Spirit of Race**	**(United Kingdom) Duncan Cameron (South Africa) David Perel (Republic of Ireland) Matt Griffin**	**Ferrari 296 LMGT3**	G	**113**	**+12 Laps**
30	LMGT3	63	(Italy) Iron Lynx	(Japan) Hiroshi Hamaguchi (Zimbabwe) Axcil Jefferies (Italy) Andrea Caldarelli	Lamborghini Huracan LMGT3 Evo2	G	113	+12 Laps
31	LMGT3	59	(Switzerland) Racing Spirit of Léman	(United States) Derek DeBoer (United Kingdom) Casper Stevenson (France) Valentin Hasse-Clot	Aston Martin Vantage AMR LMGT3	G	113	+12 Laps
32	LMGT3	85	(Germany) Iron Dames	(Belgium) Sarah Bovy (Switzerland) Rahel Frey (Denmark) Michelle Gatting	Porsche 911 GT3 R LMGT3	G	113	+12 Laps
33	LMGT3	86	(United Kingdom) GR Racing	(United Kingdom) Michael Wainwright (Italy) Riccardo Pera (Italy) Davide Rigon	Ferrari 296 LMGT3	G	113	+12 Laps
34	LMGT3	51	(Italy) AF Corse	(France) Charles-Henri Samani (France) Emmanuel Collard (Argentina) Nicolás Varrone	Ferrari 296 LMGT3	G	113	+12 Laps
35	LMGT3	97	(United Kingdom) Grid Motorsport by TF	(Singapore) Martin Berry (United Kingdom) Lorcan Hanafin (United Kingdom) Jonathan Adam	Aston Martin Vantage AMR LMGT3	G	112	+13 Laps
36	LMGT3	60	(Germany) Proton Competition	(Italy) Claudio Schiavoni (Italy) Matteo Cressoni (France) Julien Andlauer	Porsche 911 GT3 R LMGT3	G	112	+13 Laps
37	LMGT3	50	(Denmark) Formula Racing	(Denmark) Johnny Laursen (Denmark) Conrad Laursen (Denmark) Nicklas Nielsen	Ferrari 296 LMGT3	G	112	+13 Laps
38	LMGT3	66	(United Kingdom) JMW Motorsport	(United Kingdom) John Hartshorne (United Kingdom) Ben Tuck (United Kingdom) Philip Keen	Ferrari 296 LMGT3	G	111	+14 Laps
Not classified
	LMP2	34	(Poland) Inter Europol Competition	(United Kingdom) Oliver Gray (France) Clément Novalak (Italy) Luca Ghiotto	Oreca 07	G	113	Gearbox
	LMP2	37	(Switzerland) COOL Racing	(Spain) Lorenzo Fluxá (Denmark) Malthe Jakobsen (Japan) Ritomo Miyata	Oreca 07	G	101	Gearbox
	LMP3	12	(Germany) WTM by Rinaldi Racing	(Germany) Torsten Kratz (Germany) Leonard Weiss (Colombia) Óscar Tunjo	Duqueine M30 - D08	MI	77	Master relay
	LMP3	88	(Poland) Inter Europol Competition	(United Arab Emirates) Alexander Bukhantsov (United Kingdom) Kai Askey (Portugal) Pedro Perino	Ligier JS P320	MI	69	Did not finish
	LMGT3	57	(Switzerland) Kessel Racing	(Japan) Takeshi Kimura (France) Esteban Masson (Brazil) Daniel Serra	Ferrari 296 LMGT3	G	47	Did not finish

=== Statistics ===
==== Fastest lap ====
Class	Driver	Team	Time	Lap
LMP2	(United Kingdom) Olli Caldwell	(Portugal) #25 Algarve Pro Racing	1:43.076	55
LMP2 Pro/Am	(France) Matthieu Vaxivière	(Italy) #83 AF Corse	1:42.781	88
LMP3	(United States) Wyatt Brichacek	(Luxembourg) #4 DKR Engineering	1:51.853	105
LMGT3	(France) Julien Andlauer	(Germany) #60 Proton Competition	1:55.885	105
