= Bernardo Pinheiro =

Portuguese racing driver (born 2004)

- Nationality: (Portugal) Portuguese
- Born: 3 March 2004 (age 22) Portugal

European Le Mans Series career
- Debut season: 2024
- Current team: Team Virage
- Categorisation: FIA Silver
- Car number: 11
- Starts: 5 (5 entries)
- Wins: 2
- Podiums: 3
- Poles: 0
- Fastest laps: 0
- Best finish: TBD in 2024

Previous series
- 2022–23: Ligier European Series - JS P4

Bernardo Lucas Pinheiro (born 3 March 2004) is a Portuguese racing driver currently competing for Team Virage in the European Le Mans Series. He finished as the runner-up in the 2023 season of the Ligier European Series's JS P4 class alongside George King.

== Career ==
After competing in karts, Pinheiro made his car racing debut at his father's track in 2022, racing for Team Virage in the final round of the Ligier European Series. He and José Maria Marreiros finished last in the JS P4 class during race 1 as Marreiros spun but improved to eighth place in race 2. Pinheiro would remain with the team for a full season of the LES in 2023, this time partnering the previous year's third place finisher George King. The pair scored two runner-up finishes at the Barcelona season opener, coming up short to teammate Mihnea Ștefan in both races.

After retiring from the Le Mans round Pinheiro and King established themselves as a top team, only losing out on victory to Ștefan at Le Castellet, and finishing third in race 2 at Aragón; Pinheiro also scored his maiden pole position at the latter track but missed out on the win in race 1 when King encountered a fuel issue mere metres before the finish line. They then took their first win of the season in Belgium, where Pinheiro passed Ștefan, who would clinch the title at that round, during the opening stint. The Portuguese won the season finale at Portimão to claim second in the standings alongside King, before the pair and Ștefan took part in the European Le Mans Series's post-season test.

Having taken a podium in the third round of the Prototype Winter Series at the start of 2024, Pinheiro would enter the LMP3 class of the ELMS alongside 2023 Le Mans Cup champions Gillian Henrion and Julien Gerbi, once again returning to Team Virage. The No. 8 crew got off to a strong start, as they won the opening race at Barcelona. At the next race in Le Castellet however, Pinheiro failed to drive for the mandated minimum time of 40 minutes, meaning that he would be ineligible to score any points from their seventh place finish. After Pinheiro competed in the Road to Le Mans event in June he and his Team Virage teammates finished second in Imola. They then took sixth place at Spa before a well-executed fuel saving stint by Henrion guaranteed them victory at Mugello.

== Personal life ==
He was the son of Paulo Pinheiro, the CEO of the Algarve International Circuit, who died in July 2024.

== Racing record ==
=== Racing career summary ===
Season	Series	Team	Races	Wins	Poles	F/Laps	Podiums	Points	Position
2022	Ligier European Series - JS P4	Team Virage	2	0	0	0	0	5	23rd
2023	Ligier European Series - JS P4	Team Virage	11	2	1	1	8	167	**2nd**
2024	Prototype Winter Series - Class 3	Mühlner Motorsport	2	0	0	0	1	11.43	10th
2024	European Le Mans Series - LMP3	Team Virage	6	2	0	0	3	76	4th
2024	Le Mans Cup - LMP3	Team Virage	2	0	0	0	0	0	NC†
2024	Ultimate Cup Series - Proto P3	Bretton Racing	1	0	1	1	0	10	36th
2025	Supercars Endurance Series - GT4	Speedy Motorsport							

^{†} As Pinheiro was a guest driver, he was ineligible for championship points.
*Season still in progress.

=== Complete Ligier European Series results ===
(key) (Races in bold indicate pole position; results in italics indicate fastest lap)

Year	Entrant	Class	Chassis	1	2	3	4	5	6	7	8	9	10	11	12	Rank	Points
2022	Team Virage	JS P4	Ligier JS P4	LEC; 1	LEC; 2	IMO; 1	IMO; 2	LMS; 1	LMS; 2	MNZ; 1	MNZ; 2	SPA; 1	SPA; 2	ALG; 1; 10	ALG; 2; 8	23rd	5
2023	Team Virage	JS P4	Ligier JS P4	CAT; 1; 2	CAT; 2; 2	LMS; Ret	LEC; 1; 2	LEC; 2; 2	**ARA**; **1** Ret	ARA; 2; 3	SPA; 1; 4	SPA; 2; 1	ALG; 1; 2	ALG; 2; 1		2nd	167

=== Complete European Le Mans Series results ===
(key) (Races in bold indicate pole position; results in italics indicate fastest lap)

Year	Entrant	Class	Chassis	Engine	1	2	3	4	5	6	Rank	Points
2024	Team Virage	LMP3	Ligier JS P320	Nissan VK56DE 5.6L V8	CAT; 1	LEC; 7	IMO; 2	SPA; 6	MUG; 1	ALG; 6	4th	76

^{*} Season still in progress.
