= 2024 4 Hours of Spa-Francorchamps =

Endurance sportscar racing event

The layout of the Circuit de Spa-Francorchamps

The 2024 4 Hours of Spa-Francorchamps was an endurance sportscar racing event held between 23 and 25 August 2024, as the fourth round of the 2024 European Le Mans Series season.

== Entry list ==
The pre-event entry list was published on 14 August and consisted of 43 entries between 4 categories – 14 in LMP2, 8 in LMP2 Pro/Am, 10 in LMP3 and 11 in LMGT3.

After missing previous round, Ritomo Miyata returned to the No. 37 COOL Racing. As a result of a clash with IMSA SportsCar Championship, Oliver Jarvis missed this round and Filipe Albuquerque replaced him in the No. 21 United Autosports. Nick Yelloly joined John Falb and Colin Noble in the No. 24 Nielsen Racing. Wayne Boyd and Tristan Vautier joined Anthony Wells in the No. 19 Team Virage. Louis Rossi raced alongside Lahaye brothers in the No. 35 Ultimate. Benjamin Pedersen is going to replace Nico Pino in the No. 27 Nielsen Racing. Niels Koolen did not take part in this round and Rasmus Lindh replaced him in the No. 30 Duqueine Team. Before the race Belén García decided to split with DKR Engineering due to unsolved problems with her driving position in the Duqueine M30 - D08. Her late withdrawal meant Wyatt Brichacek and Alexander Mattschull raced as the duo in the car No. 4.

== Schedule ==
| Date | Time (local: CEST) | Event |
|---|---|---|
| Friday, 23 August | 11:00 | Free Practice 1 |
| Friday, 23 August | 14:55 | Bronze Drivers Collective Test |
| Saturday, 24 August | 10:15 | Free Practice 2 |
| Saturday, 24 August | 14:00 | Qualifying - LMGT3 |
| Saturday, 24 August | 14:25 | Qualifying - LMP3 |
| Saturday, 24 August | 14:50 | Qualifying - LMP2 Pro/Am |
| Saturday, 24 August | 15:15 | Qualifying - LMP2 |
| Sunday, 25 August | 11:30 | Race |

== Free practice ==
- Only the fastest car in each class is shown.

| Free Practice 1 | Class | No. | Entrant | Time |
|---|---|---|---|---|
| Free Practice 1 | LMP2 | 65 | (France) Panis Racing | 2:01.385 |
| Free Practice 1 | LMP2 Pro/Am | 21 | (United Kingdom) United Autosports | 2:02.294 |
| Free Practice 1 | LMP3 | 17 | (Switzerland) COOL Racing | 2:11.211 |
| Free Practice 1 | LMGT3 | 57 | (Switzerland) Kessel Racing | 2:15.876 |
| Free Practice 2 | LMP2 | 43 | (Poland) Inter Europol Competition | 2:01.435 |
| Free Practice 2 | LMP2 Pro/Am | 83 | (Italy) AF Corse | 2:03.808 |
| Free Practice 2 | LMP3 | 8 | (Poland) Team Virage | 2:12.674 |
| Free Practice 2 | LMGT3 | 57 | (Switzerland) Kessel Racing | 2:16.355 |

== Qualifying ==
Pole position winners in each class are marked in bold.

| Pos | Class | No. | Team | Driver | Time | Gap | Grid |
|---|---|---|---|---|---|---|---|
| 1 | **LMP2** | **14** | **(United States) AO by TF** | **(Switzerland) Louis Delétraz** | **2:01.253** | — | 1 |
| 2 | LMP2 | 65 | (France) Panis Racing | (France) Charles Milesi | 2:01.660 | +0,407 | 2 |
| 3 | LMP2 | 43 | (Poland) Inter Europol Competition | (France) Tom Dillmann | 2:01.665 | +0,412 | 3 |
| 4 | LMP2 | 37 | (Switzerland) COOL Racing | (Japan) Ritomo Miyata | 2:02.064 | +0,811 | 4 |
| 5 | LMP2 | 25 | (Portugal) Algarve Pro Racing | (United Kingdom) Alexander Lynn | 2:02.071 | +0,818 | 5 |
| 6 | LMP2 | 23 | (United Kingdom) United Autosports | (United Kingdom) Paul di Resta | 2:02.114 | +0,861 | 6 |
| 7 | LMP2 | 10 | (United Kingdom) Vector Sport | (Brazil) Felipe Drugovich | 2:02.184 | +0,931 | 7 |
| 8 | LMP2 | 9 | (Germany) Iron Lynx – Proton | (Italy) Matteo Cairoli | 2:02.216 | +0,963 | 8 |
| 9 | LMP2 | 34 | (Poland) Inter Europol Competition | (Italy) Luca Ghiotto | 2:02.237 | +0,984 | 9 |
| 10 | LMP2 | 28 | (France) IDEC Sport | (Netherlands) Job van Uitert | 2:02.479 | +1,226 | 10 |
| 11 | LMP2 | 27 | (United Kingdom) Nielsen Racing | (United Kingdom) Will Stevens | 2:02.630 | +1,377 | 11 |
| 12 | LMP2 | 30 | (France) Duqueine Team | (Australia) James Allen | 2:02.879 | +1,626 | 12 |
| 13 | **LMP2 Pro/Am** | **29** | **(France) Richard Mille by TDS** | **(United States) Rodrigo Sales** | **2:04.537** | **+3,284** | 15 |
| 14 | LMP2 Pro/Am | 77 | (Germany) Proton Competition | (Italy) Giorgio Roda | 2:04.570 | +3,317 | 16 |
| 15 | LMP2 Pro/Am | 24 | (United Kingdom) Nielsen Racing | (United States) John Falb | 2:04.670 | +3,417 | 17 |
| 16 | LMP2 Pro/Am | 83 | (Italy) AF Corse | (France) François Perrodo | 2:05.036 | +3,783 | 18 |
| 17 | LMP2 Pro/Am | 21 | (United Kingdom) United Autosports | (Brazil) Daniel Schneider | 2:05.720 | +4,467 | 19 |
| 18 | LMP2 Pro/Am | 19 | (Poland) Team Virage | (United Kingdom) Anthony Wells | 2:05.911 | +4,658 | 20 |
| 19 | LMP2 Pro/Am | 20 | (Portugal) Algarve Pro Racing | (Greece) Kriton Lendoudis | 2:09.127 | +7,874 | 21 |
| 20 | LMP2 Pro/Am | 3 | (Luxembourg) DKR Engineering | (Australia) Andres Latorre Canon | 2:10.193 | +8,940 | 22 |
| 21 | **LMP3** | **15** | **(United Kingdom) RLR M Sport** | **(France) Gaël Julien** | **2:11.847** | **+10,594** | 23 |
| 22 | LMP3 | 17 | (Switzerland) COOL Racing | (Portugal) Manuel Espírito Santo | 2:11.887 | +10,634 | 24 |
| 23 | LMP3 | 88 | (Poland) Inter Europol Competition | (Portugal) Pedro Perino | 2:12.061 | +10,808 | 25 |
| 24 | LMP3 | 8 | (Poland) Team Virage | (France) Gillian Henrion | 2:12.080 | +10,827 | 26 |
| 25 | LMP3 | 12 | (Germany) WTM by Rinaldi Racing | (Colombia) Óscar Tunjo | 2:12.259 | +11,006 | 27 |
| 26 | LMP3 | 35 | (France) Ultimate | (France) Jean-Baptiste Lahaye | 2:12.605 | +11,352 | 28 |
| 27 | LMP3 | 11 | (Italy) Eurointernational | (Canada) Adam Ali | 2:12.858 | +11,605 | 29 |
| 28 | LMP3 | 5 | (United Kingdom) RLR M Sport | (United Kingdom) Bailey Voisin | 2:13.313 | +12,060 | 30 |
| 29 | LMP3 | 31 | (Switzerland) Racing Spirit of Léman | (France) Antoine Doquin | 2:13.369 | +12,116 | 31 |
| 30 | LMP2 | 47 | (Switzerland) COOL Racing | (Denmark) Frederik Vesti | 2:14.923 | +13,670 | 13 |
| 31 | **LMGT3** | **63** | **(Italy) Iron Lynx** | **(Japan) Hiroshi Hamaguchi** | **2:17.873** | **+16,620** | 32 |
| 32 | LMGT3 | 50 | (Denmark) Formula Racing | (Denmark) Johnny Laursen | 2:18.916 | +17,663 | 33 |
| 33 | LMGT3 | 97 | (United Kingdom) Grid Motorsport by TF | (Singapore) Martin Berry | 2:19.096 | +17,843 | 34 |
| 34 | LMGT3 | 55 | (Switzerland) Spirit of Race | (United Kingdom) Duncan Cameron | 2:19.246 | +17,993 | 42 (Note: Stewards allowed David Perel, driver of the No. 55 Spirit of Race, to take part in the race despite him not fulfilling the 110% rule. Stewards also obliged Matthew Griffin, the crew's fastest driver, to start the race from the back of the category.) |
| 35 | LMGT3 | 85 | (Italy) Iron Dames | (Belgium) Sarah Bovy | 2:19.508 | +18,255 | 38 (Note: The No. 85 Iron Dames was moved 3 places on the grid for causing a collision with car No. 23 United Autosports during the Free Practice 1.) |
| 36 | LMGT3 | 57 | (Switzerland) Kessel Racing | (Japan) Takeshi Kimura | 2:19.680 | +18,427 | 35 |
| 37 | LMGT3 | 59 | (Switzerland) Racing Spirit of Léman | (United States) Derek DeBoer | 2:19.729 | +18,476 | 36 |
| 38 | LMGT3 | 51 | (Italy) AF Corse | (France) Charles-Henri Samani | 2:20.247 | +18,994 | 37 |
| 39 | LMGT3 | 86 | (United Kingdom) GR Racing | (United Kingdom) Michael Wainwright | 2:20.480 | +19,227 | 39 |
| 40 | LMGT3 | 60 | (Germany) Proton Competition | (Italy) Claudio Schiavoni | 2:22.157 | +20,904 | 40 |
| 41 | LMGT3 | 66 | (United Kingdom) JMW Motorsport | (United Kingdom) John Hartshorne | 2:25.878 | +24,625 | 41 |
| 42 | LMP2 | 22 | (United Kingdom) United Autosports | (United Kingdom) Benjamin Hanley | — | | 14 (Note: The No. 22 United Autosports was penalised for causing the red flag during Qualifying session. Benjamin Hanley was not allowed to rejoin the session and lost all his lap times. Stewards allowed the No. 22 to start from the back of category and obliged this crew to start the race with their fastest driver.) |
| 43 | LMP3 | 4 | (Luxembourg) DKR Engineering | — | | | 43 (Note: The No. 4 DKR Engineering was allowed by stewards to take part in the race despite not fulfilling the 110% rule in Qualifying. Stewards also obliged Wyatt Brichacek, the crew's fastest driver, to start the race from the back of the grid.) |

== Race ==
=== Race result ===
The minimum number of laps for classification (70% of overall winning car's distance) was 66 laps. Class winners are marked in bold.

Final Classification
| Pos | Class | No | Team | Drivers | Car | Tyres | Laps | Time/Gap |
|---|---|---|---|---|---|---|---|---|
| 1 | **LMP2** | **14** | **(United States) AO by TF** | **(United Kingdom) Jonny Edgar (Switzerland) Louis Delétraz (Poland) Robert Kubica** | **Oreca 07** | G | **95** | **4:01:28.729** |
| 2 | LMP2 | 43 | (Poland) Inter Europol Competition | (Mexico) Sebastián Álvarez (France) Vladislav Lomko (France) Tom Dillmann | Oreca 07 | G | 95 | +1.100 |
| 3 | LMP2 | 28 | (France) IDEC Sport | (Argentina) Marcos Siebert (France) Reshad de Gerus (Netherlands) Job van Uitert | Oreca 07 | G | 95 | +32.436 |
| 4 | LMP2 | 34 | (Poland) Inter Europol Competition | (United Kingdom) Oliver Gray (France) Clément Novalak (Italy) Luca Ghiotto | Oreca 07 | G | 95 | +33.731 |
| 5 | LMP2 | 37 | (Switzerland) COOL Racing | (Spain) Lorenzo Fluxá (Denmark) Malthe Jakobsen (Japan) Ritomo Miyata | Oreca 07 | G | 95 | +45.658 |
| 6 | LMP2 | 65 | (France) Panis Racing | (United Kingdom) Manuel Maldonado (France) Charles Milesi (Monaco) Arthur Leclerc | Oreca 07 | G | 95 | +47.273 |
| 7 | LMP2 | 9 | (Germany) Iron Lynx – Proton | (Germany) Jonas Ried (France) Macéo Capietto (Italy) Matteo Cairoli | Oreca 07 | G | 95 | +57.022 |
| 8 | **LMP2 Pro/Am** | **83** | **(Italy) AF Corse** | **(France) François Perrodo (France) Matthieu Vaxivière (Italy) Alessio Rovera** | **Oreca 07** | G | **95** | **+1:01.303** |
| 9 | LMP2 Pro/Am | 77 | (Germany) Proton Competition | (Italy) Giorgio Roda (Austria) René Binder (Netherlands) Bent Viscaal | Oreca 07 | G | 95 | +1:18.608 |
| 10 | LMP2 | 10 | (United Kingdom) Vector Sport | (United Kingdom) Ryan Cullen (Monaco) Stéphane Richelmi (Brazil) Felipe Drugovich | Oreca 07 | G | 95 | +1:25.528 |
| 11 | LMP2 Pro/Am | 20 | (Portugal) Algarve Pro Racing | (Greece) Kriton Lendoudis (United Kingdom) Richard Bradley (United Kingdom) Alex Quinn | Oreca 07 | G | 95 | +1:26.750 |
| 12 | LMP2 | 22 | (United Kingdom) United Autosports | (Romania) Filip Ugran (Japan) Marino Sato (United Kingdom) Benjamin Hanley | Oreca 07 | G | 95 | +1:29.917 |
| 13 | LMP2 Pro/Am | 24 | (United Kingdom) Nielsen Racing | (United States) John Falb (United Kingdom) Colin Noble (United Kingdom) Nick Yelloly | Oreca 07 | G | 95 | +1:30.457 |
| 14 | LMP2 | 23 | (United Kingdom) United Autosports | (United States) Bijoy Garg (Switzerland) Fabio Scherer (United Kingdom) Paul di Resta | Oreca 07 | G | 95 | +1:32.574 |
| 15 | LMP2 Pro/Am | 3 | (Luxembourg) DKR Engineering | (Australia) Andres Latorre Canon (Turkey) Cem Bölükbaşı (Germany) Laurents Hörr | Oreca 07 | G | 95 | +1:43.810 |
| 16 | LMP2 Pro/Am | 21 | (United Kingdom) United Autosports | (Brazil) Daniel Schneider (United Kingdom) Andrew Meyrick (Portugal) Filipe Albuquerque | Oreca 07 | G | 95 | +1:52.067 |
| 17 | LMP2 Pro/Am | 19 | (Poland) Team Virage | (United Kingdom) Anthony Wells (United Kingdom) Wayne Boyd (France) Tristan Vautier | Oreca 07 | G | 95 | +1:59.492 |
| 18 | LMP2 | 47 | (Switzerland) COOL Racing | (Thailand) Carl Bennett (Austria) Ferdinand Habsburg (Denmark) Frederik Vesti | Oreca 07 | G | 95 | +2:07.150 |
| 19 | LMP2 | 30 | (France) Duqueine Team | (Sweden) Rasmus Lindh (France) Jean-Baptiste Simmenauer (Australia) James Allen | Oreca 07 | G | 94 | +1 Lap |
| 20 | LMP2 | 27 | (United Kingdom) Nielsen Racing | (Denmark) David Heinemeier Hansson (United States) Benjamin Pedersen (United Kingdom) Will Stevens | Oreca 07 | G | 94 | +1 Lap |
| 21 | LMP2 | 25 | (Portugal) Algarve Pro Racing | (Liechtenstein) Matthias Kaiser (United Kingdom) Olli Caldwell (United Kingdom) Alexander Lynn | Oreca 07 | G | 92 | +3 Laps |
| 22 | **LMP3** | **11** | **(Italy) Eurointernational** | **(United Kingdom) Matthew Richard Bell (Canada) Adam Ali** | **Ligier JS P320** | MI | **91** | **+4 Laps** |
| 23 | LMP3 | 31 | (Switzerland) Racing Spirit of Léman | (France) Jacques Wolff (France) Jean-Ludovic Foubert (France) Antoine Doquin | Ligier JS P320 | MI | 91 | +4 Laps |
| 24 | LMP3 | 17 | (Switzerland) COOL Racing | (Portugal) Miguel Cristóvão (Switzerland) Cédric Oltramare (Portugal) Manuel Espírito Santo | Ligier JS P320 | MI | 91 | +4 Laps |
| 25 | LMP3 | 15 | (United Kingdom) RLR M Sport | (Denmark) Michael Jensen (United Kingdom) Nick Adcock (France) Gaël Julien | Ligier JS P320 | MI | 91 | +4 Laps |
| 26 | LMP3 | 35 | (France) Ultimate | (France) Louis Rossi (France) Jean-Baptiste Lahaye (France) Matthieu Lahaye (Note: Matthieu Lahaye failed to meet the minimum driving time to score points.) | Ligier JS P320 | MI | 91 | +4 Laps |
| 27 | LMP3 | 8 | (Poland) Team Virage | (Algeria) Julien Gerbi (Portugal) Bernardo Pinheiro (France) Gillian Henrion | Ligier JS P320 | MI | 91 | +4 Laps |
| 28 | LMP3 | 4 | (Luxembourg) DKR Engineering | (Germany) Alexander Mattschull (United States) Wyatt Brichacek | Duqueine M30 - D08 | MI | 91 | +4 Laps |
| 29 | LMP3 | 12 | (Germany) WTM by Rinaldi Racing | (Germany) Torsten Kratz (Germany) Leonard Weiss (Colombia) Óscar Tunjo | Duqueine M30 - D08 | MI | 91 | +4 Laps |
| 30 | LMP3 | 88 | (Poland) Inter Europol Competition | (United Arab Emirates) Alexander Bukhantsov (United Kingdom) Kai Askey (Portugal) Pedro Perino | Ligier JS P320 | MI | 91 | +4 Laps |
| 31 | LMP3 | 5 | (United Kingdom) RLR M Sport | (Canada) James Dayson (Canada) Daniel Ali (United Kingdom) Bailey Voisin | Ligier JS P320 | MI | 90 | +5 Laps |
| 32 | **LMGT3** | **57** | **(Switzerland) Kessel Racing** | **(Japan) Takeshi Kimura (France) Esteban Masson (Brazil) Daniel Serra** | **Ferrari 296 LMGT3** | G | **89** | **+6 Laps** |
| 33 | LMGT3 | 86 | (United Kingdom) GR Racing | (United Kingdom) Michael Wainwright (Italy) Riccardo Pera (Italy) Davide Rigon | Ferrari 296 LMGT3 | G | 88 | +7 Laps |
| 34 | LMGT3 | 51 | (Italy) AF Corse | (France) Charles-Henri Samani (France) Emmanuel Collard (Argentina) Nicolás Varrone | Ferrari 296 LMGT3 | G | 88 | +7 Laps |
| 35 | LMGT3 | 59 | (Switzerland) Racing Spirit of Léman | (United States) Derek DeBoer (United Kingdom) Casper Stevenson (France) Valentin Hasse-Clot | Aston Martin Vantage AMR LMGT3 | G | 88 | +7 Laps |
| 36 | LMGT3 | 97 | (United Kingdom) Grid Motorsport by TF | (Singapore) Martin Berry (United Kingdom) Lorcan Hanafin (United Kingdom) Jonathan Adam | Aston Martin Vantage AMR LMGT3 | G | 88 | +7 Laps |
| 37 | LMGT3 | 60 | (Germany) Proton Competition | (Italy) Claudio Schiavoni (Italy) Matteo Cressoni (France) Julien Andlauer | Porsche 911 GT3 R LMGT3 | G | 87 | +8 Laps |
Not classified
| | LMP2 Pro/Am | 29 | (France) Richard Mille by TDS | (United States) Rodrigo Sales (Switzerland) Mathias Beche (Switzerland) Grégoire Saucy | Oreca 07 | G | 31 | |
| | LMGT3 | 50 | (Denmark) Formula Racing | (Denmark) Johnny Laursen (Denmark) Conrad Laursen (Denmark) Nicklas Nielsen | Ferrari 296 LMGT3 | G | 30 | |
| | LMGT3 | 63 | (Italy) Iron Lynx | (Japan) Hiroshi Hamaguchi (Zimbabwe) Axcil Jefferies (Italy) Andrea Caldarelli | Lamborghini Huracan LMGT3 Evo2 | G | 25 | |
| | LMGT3 | 85 | (Italy) Iron Dames | (Belgium) Sarah Bovy (Switzerland) Rahel Frey (Denmark) Michelle Gatting | Porsche 911 GT3 R LMGT3 | G | 25 | |
| | LMGT3 | 55 | (Switzerland) Spirit of Race | (United Kingdom) Duncan Cameron (South Africa) David Perel (Republic of Ireland) Matt Griffin | Ferrari 296 LMGT3 | G | 19 | |
| | LMGT3 | 66 | (United Kingdom) JMW Motorsport | (United Kingdom) John Hartshorne (United Kingdom) Ben Tuck (United Kingdom) Philip Keen | Ferrari 296 LMGT3 | G | 5 | |

=== Statistics ===
==== Fastest lap ====
| Class | Driver | Team | Time | Lap |
|---|---|---|---|---|
| LMP2 | (France) Charles Milesi | (France) #65 Panis Racing | 2:01.257 | 78 |
| LMP2 Pro/Am | (Italy) Alessio Rovera | (Italy) #83 AF Corse | 2:02.466 | 51 |
| LMP3 | (France) Gaël Julien | (United Kingdom) #15 RLR M Sport | 2:11.843 | 42 |
| LMGTE | (France) Esteban Masson | (Switzerland) #57 Kessel Racing | 2:16.623 | 59 |
