= Ian Aguilera =

Mexican racing driver (born 2007)

- Aguilera at Silverstone Circuit in 2026.
- Nationality: (Mexico) Mexican
- Born: 14 March 2007 (age 19) Guadalajara, Mexico
- Categorisation: FIA Silver

Ian Aguilera Ituarte (born 14 March 2007 in Guadalajara) is a Mexican racing driver who last competed in the LMP2 class of the European Le Mans Series for CLX Motorsport.

Aguilera is the 2024 Radical World Finals champion in the Pro1500 class and has been a member of Escudería Telmex since 2019.

== Early career ==
Racing in karts from 2016 to 2019, Aguilera most notably won the 2019 Nacional Formula Karts title in the X30 Junior category and represented Mexico in that year's IAME International Final. Stepping up to cars in 2021, Aguilera spent two years in the Ginetta Junior Championship for R Racing, where he scored a lone win at Thruxton in 2022.

In early 2023, Aguilera joined RLR MSport to compete in the JS P4 class of the Ligier European Series, alongside Haytham Qarajouli. On his series debut, Aguilera took his maiden podium, finishing third in race one at Barcelona and followed that up with another third-place finish at Paul Ricard, which helped him to end the season fourth in the standings. Aguilera returned to Ligier European Series and RLR MSport for 2024, albeit driving solo for his sophomore season in the series. Having scored one podium in the first five races, Aguilera won three times in the second half, at Spa, Mugello, and Algarve which enabled him to finish runner-up in points at season's end.

== Endurance racing ==
Having made his LMP3 debut with RLR MSport at the 2024 Road to Le Mans where he scored a best result of ninth in race one, Aguilera stayed with the British team to race in the LMP3 class of the 2024–25 Asian Le Mans Series. He took his first LMP3 win in race two at Dubai, and at Abu Dhabi won race one and finished second in race two to end the season runner-up in points. On February 13, 2025, it was announced that Aguilera would join EuroInternational for his debut in the European Le Mans Series, alongside Sebastian Gravlund and Fabien Michal. In his rookie year in the series, Aguilera scored podiums at both Le Castellet and Imola by finishing third in both races, as he ended the year fifth in the LMP3 standings.

For 2026, Aguilera stepped up to LMP2 competition as he joined CLX Motorsport for his sophomore year in the European Le Mans Series with Adrien Closmenil and Theodor Jensen. In his maiden season in the category, Aguilera took a best result of fifth at Silverstone and competed at the 24 Hours of Le Mans with his ELMS teammates, as the youngest-ever trio to compete at the French enduro. During 2026, Aguilera also made his GT3 debut at the 24 Hours of Spa for BMW-fielding Paradine Competition. At the end of the year, Aguilera joined United Autosports to continue in LMP2 competition, as he returned to the 2026–27 Asian Le Mans Series.

== Karting record ==
=== Karting career summary ===
| Season | Series | Team | Position |
|---|---|---|---|
| 2016 | SKUSA SuperNationals – Micro Swift | GP VCI Mexico | 15th |
| 2017 | Florida Winter Tour – Micro ROK | | 6th |
| 2017 | SKUSA Pro Tour – Micro Swift | | 10th |
| 2017 | SKUSA SuperNationals – Micro Swift | Ryan Perry Motorsport | 38th |
| 2018 | SKUSA SuperNationals – X30 Junior | Team GFC | 34th |
| 2019 | Florida Winter Tour – Junior ROK | Escuderia Telmex-Fussion | 36th |
| 2019 | IAME Euro Series – X30 Junior | Fusion Motorsport | 31st |
| 2019 | British Kart Championship – X30 Junior | Fusion Motorsport | 14th |
| 2019 | Motorsport UK Kartmasters Grand Prix – X30 Junior | Fusion Motorsport | 20th |
| 2019 | IAME International Final – X30 Junior | | NC |
| 2019 | SKUSA SuperNationals – X30 Junior | | 30th |

== Racing record ==
=== Racing career summary ===
| Season | Series | Team | Races | Wins | Poles | F/Laps | Podiums | Points | Position |
|---|---|---|---|---|---|---|---|---|---|
| 2021 | Ginetta Junior Championship | R Racing | 24 | 0 | 0 | 0 | 0 | 65 | 22nd |
| 2022 | Ginetta Junior Championship | R Racing | 13 | 1 | 0 | 0 | 1 | 139 | 17th |
| 2023 | Ligier European Series – JS P4 | RLR MSport | 11 | 0 | 1 | 0 | 2 | 118 | 4th |
| 2023 | Endurance Prototype Challenge – LMP3 | TS Corse | 1 | 0 | 0 | 0 | 0 | 12 | 24th |
| 2023–24 | Gulf Radical Cup | | 9 | 3 | 6 | 4 | | 106 | 7th |
| 2024 | Ligier European Series – JS P4 | RLR MSport | 11 | 3 | 4 | 1 | 7 | 179 | **2nd** |
| 2024 | Le Mans Cup – LMP3 | RLR MSport | 2 | 0 | 0 | 0 | 0 | 0 | NC |
| 2024 | European Endurance Prototype Cup – LMP3 | RLR MSport | 1 | 0 | 0 | 0 | 1 | 15 | 23rd |
| 2024 | European Endurance Prototype Cup – NP02 | CD Sport | 2 | 0 | 0 | 0 | 1 | 24 | 21st |
| 2024 | Hagerty Radical Cup UK – SR3 | Raw Motorsports | 3 | 1 | 2 | 1 | 3 | 61 | 9th |
| 2024–25 | Gulf Radical Cup | TT Racing | 18 | 5 | 4 | 4 | 7 | 253 | **3rd** |
| 2024–25 | Asian Le Mans Series – LMP3 | RLR MSport | 6 | 2 | 0 | 0 | 4 | 93 | **2nd** |
| 2025 | European Le Mans Series – LMP3 | EuroInternational | 6 | 0 | 0 | 1 | 2 | 60 | 5th |
| 2026 | European Le Mans Series – LMP2 | CLX Motorsport | 6 | 0 | 0 | 0 | 0 | 36 | 9th |
| 2026 | 24 Hours of Le Mans – LMP2 | CLX Motorsport | 1 | 0 | 0 | 0 | 0 | —N/a | 5th |
| 2026 | European Endurance Prototype Cup | ANS Motorsport | 5 | 2 | 1 | 2 | 3 | 92.5* | **1st*** |
| 2026 | GT World Challenge Europe Endurance Cup | Paradine Competition | 1 | 0 | 0 | 0 | 0 | 0 | NC |
| 2026 | GT World Challenge Europe Endurance Cup – Silver | Paradine Competition | 1 | 0 | 0 | 0 | 0 | 0 | NC |
| 2026 | Intercontinental GT Challenge | Paradine Competition | 1 | 0 | 0 | 0 | 0 | 0 | NC |
| 2026–27 | Asian Le Mans Series – LMP2 | United Autosports | | | | | | | |
| 2027 | IMSA SportsCar Championship – LMP2 | United Autosports | | | | | | | |

=== Complete Ginetta Junior Championship results ===
(key) (Races in bold indicate pole position) (Races in italics indicate fastest lap)

| Year | Team | 1 | 2 | 3 | 4 | 5 | 6 | 7 | 8 | 9 | 10 | 11 | 12 | 13 | 14 | 15 | 16 | 17 | 18 | 19 | 20 | 21 | 22 | 23 | 24 | 25 | 26 | DC | Points |
|---|---|---|---|---|---|---|---|---|---|---|---|---|---|---|---|---|---|---|---|---|---|---|---|---|---|---|---|---|---|
| 2021 | R Racing | THR; 1; 14 | THR; 2; 19 | SNE; 1; 19 | SNE; 2; 23 | SNE; 3 Ret | BHI; 1; 9 | BHI; 2 Ret | BHI; 3 DNS | OUL; 1; 23 | OUL; 2 C | KNO; 1; 20 | KNO; 2; 22 | KNO; 3; 19 | KNO; 4; 22 | THR; 1; 24 | THR; 2; 18 | THR; 3; 18 | SIL; 1; 10 | SIL; 2; 19 | SIL; 3; 11 | DON; 1; 20 | DON; 2; 26 | DON; 3; 15 | BHGP; 1; 18 | BHGP; 2; 26 | BHGP; 3; 21 | 22nd | 65 |
| 2022 | R Racing | DON; 1; 6 | DON; 2 Ret | DON; 3; 10 | BHI; 1; 20 | BHI; 2 Ret | BHI; 3; 11 | THR1; 1 DSQ | THR1; 2; 1 | CRO; 1; 7 | CRO; 2; 7 | KNO; 1 DSQ | KNO; 2; 7 | KNO; 3; 7 | SNE; 1 | SNE; 2 | SNE; 3 | THR2; 1 | THR2; 2 | THR2; 3 | SIL; 1 | SIL; 2 | SIL; 3 | BHGP; 1 | BHGP; 2 | BHGP; 3 | | 17th | 139 |

=== Complete Ligier European Series results ===
(key) (Races in bold indicate pole position; results in italics indicate fastest lap)

| Year | Entrant | Class | Chassis | 1 | 2 | 3 | 4 | 5 | 6 | 7 | 8 | 9 | 10 | 11 | Rank | Points |
|---|---|---|---|---|---|---|---|---|---|---|---|---|---|---|---|---|
| 2023 | RLR MSport | JS P4 | Ligier JS P4 | CAT; 1; 3 | CAT; 2; 6 | LMS; 8 | LEC; 1; 6 | LEC; 2; 3 | ARA; 1; 4 | ARA; 2; 4 | SPA; 1; 5 | SPA; 2; 4 | ALG; 1; 4 | **ALG**; **2**; 5 | 4th | 118 |
| 2024 | RLR MSport | JS P4 | Ligier JS P4 | CAT; 1; 4 | CAT; 2; 3 | LEC; 1; 5 | LEC; 2; 4 | LMS; 5 | **SPA**; **1**; 1 | SPA; 2; 3 | **MUG**; **1**; 1 | **MUG**; **2**; 3 | **ALG**; **1**; 1 | ALG; 2; 3 | 2nd | 179 |

=== Complete Asian Le Mans Series results ===
(key) (Races in bold indicate pole position) (Races in italics indicate fastest lap)

| Year | Team | Class | Car | Engine | 1 | 2 | 3 | 4 | 5 | 6 | DC | Points |
|---|---|---|---|---|---|---|---|---|---|---|---|---|
| 2024–25 | RLR MSport | LMP3 | Ligier JS P320 | Nissan VK56DE 5.6L V8 | SEP; 1; 5 | SEP; 2; 3 | DUB; 1 Ret | DUB; 2; 1 | ABU; 1; 1 | ABU; 2; 2 | 2nd | 93 |

=== Complete European Le Mans Series results ===
(key) (Races in bold indicate pole position; results in italics indicate fastest lap)

| Year | Entrant | Class | Chassis | Engine | 1 | 2 | 3 | 4 | 5 | 6 | Rank | Points |
|---|---|---|---|---|---|---|---|---|---|---|---|---|
| 2025 | EuroInternational | LMP3 | Ligier JS P325 | Toyota V35A 3.5 L V6 | CAT; Ret | LEC; 3 | IMO; 3 | SPA; 4 | SIL; 7 | ALG; 4 | 5th | 60 |
| 2026 | CLX Motorsport | LMP2 | Oreca 07 | Gibson GK428 4.2 L V8 | CAT; 8 | LEC; 6 | IMO; 9 | SPA; 7 | SIL; 5 | ALG; 7 | 9th | 36 |

^{*} Season still in progress.

=== Complete 24 Hours of Le Mans results ===
| Year | Team | Co-Drivers | Car | Class | Laps | Pos. | Class Pos. |
|---|---|---|---|---|---|---|---|
| 2026 | (Switzerland) CLX Motorsport | (France) Adrien Closmenil (Denmark) Theodor Jensen | Oreca 07-Gibson | LMP2 | 360 | 19th | 5th |

=== Complete GT World Challenge Europe results ===
==== GT World Challenge Europe Endurance Cup ====
(key) (Races in bold indicate pole position) (Races in italics indicate fastest lap)

| Year | Team | Car | Class | 1 | 2 | 3 | 4 | 5 | 6 | 7 | Pos. | Points |
|---|---|---|---|---|---|---|---|---|---|---|---|---|
| 2026 | Paradine Competition | BMW M4 GT3 Evo | Silver | LEC | MNZ | SPA; 6H; 69† | SPA; 12H; 69† | SPA; 24H; Ret | NÜR | ALG | NC | 0 |
