= 2024 4 Hours of Portimão =

Endurance sportscar racing event

The layout of the Algarve International Circuit

The 2024 4 Hours of Portimão was an endurance sportscar racing event held between 17 and 19 October 2024, as the final round of the 2024 European Le Mans Series season.

== Entry list ==
The entry list was published on 9 October and consisted of 43 entries in 4 categories – 14 in LMP2, 8 in LMP2 Pro/Am, 10 in LMP3 and 11 in LMGT3.

Felipe Drugovich returned to the No. 10 Vector Sport after missing previous round. Gabriel Aubry joined the No. 27 Nielsen Racing. Miguel Cristóvão and Manuel Espírito Santo drove as the duo in the No. 17 COOL Racing as Cédric Oltramare was not listed as a driver of that car anymore. Nicklas Nielsen was not a part of the No. 50 Formula Racing crew due to a clash with Ferrari's Finali Mondiali. François Heriau joined Lahaye brothers in the No. 35 Ultimate

== Schedule ==
Date	Time (local: WEST)	Event
Thursday, 17 October	11:50	Free Practice 1
Thursday, 17 October	16:20	Bronze Drivers Collective Test
Friday, 18 October	10:10	Free Practice 2
Friday, 18 October	14:45	Qualifying – LMGT3
Friday, 18 October	15:10	Qualifying – LMP3
Friday, 18 October	15:35	Qualifying – LMP2 Pro/Am
Friday, 18 October	16:00	Qualifying – LMP2
Saturday, 19 October	14:30	Race

== Free practice ==
- Only the fastest car in each class is shown.

Free Practice 1	Class	No.	Entrant	Time
Free Practice 1	LMP2 Pro/Am	29	(France) Richard Mille by TDS	1:32.246
Free Practice 1	LMP2	43	(Poland) Inter Europol Competition	1:32.253
Free Practice 1	LMP3	17	(Switzerland) COOL Racing	1:38.227
Free Practice 1	LMGT3	57	(Switzerland) Kessel Racing	1:42.759
Free Practice 2	LMP2	65	(France) Panis Racing	1:31.743
Free Practice 2	LMP2 Pro/Am	24	(United Kingdom) Nielsen Racing	1:32.673
Free Practice 2	LMP3	15	(United Kingdom) RLR M Sport	1:39.334
Free Practice 2	LMGT3	59	(Switzerland) Racing Spirit of Léman	1:42.564

== Qualifying ==
Pole position winners in each class are marked in bold.

Pos	Class	No.	Team	Driver	Time	Gap	Grid
1	**LMP2**	**65**	**(France) Panis Racing**	**(France) Charles Milesi**	**1:30.727**	—	1
2	LMP2	37	(Switzerland) COOL Racing	(Denmark) Malthe Jakobsen	1:31.109	+0,382	2
3	LMP2	27	(United Kingdom) Nielsen Racing	(United Kingdom) Will Stevens	1:31.174	+0,447	3
4	LMP2	25	(Portugal) Algarve Pro Racing	(United Kingdom) Alexander Lynn	1:31.206	+0,479	4
5	LMP2	22	(United Kingdom) United Autosports	(United Kingdom) Benjamin Hanley	1:31.341	+0,614	5
6	LMP2	28	(France) IDEC Sport	(Netherlands) Job van Uitert	1:31.433	+0,706	6
7	LMP2	14	(United States) AO by TF	(Switzerland) Louis Delétraz	1:31.474	+0,747	7
8	LMP2	9	(Germany) Iron Lynx – Proton	(Italy) Matteo Cairoli	1:31.481	+0,754	8
9	LMP2	34	(Poland) Inter Europol Competition	(France) Clément Novalak	1:31.482	+0,755	9
10	LMP2	43	(Poland) Inter Europol Competition	(France) Tom Dillmann	1:31.528	+0,801	10
11	LMP2	47	(Switzerland) COOL Racing	(Denmark) Frederik Vesti	1:31.568	+0,841	11
12	LMP2	10	(United Kingdom) Vector Sport	(Brazil) Felipe Drugovich	1:31.635	+0,908	12
13	LMP2	23	(United Kingdom) United Autosports	(United Kingdom) Paul di Resta	1:31.703	+0,976	13
14	LMP2	30	(France) Duqueine Team	(Australia) James Allen	1:31.715	+0,988	14
15	**LMP2 Pro/Am**	**77**	**(Germany) Proton Competition**	**(Italy) Giorgio Roda**	**1:32.919**	**+2,192**	15
16	LMP2 Pro/Am	29	(France) Richard Mille by TDS	(United States) Rodrigo Sales	1:33.537	+2,810	16
17	LMP2 Pro/Am	83	(Italy) AF Corse	(France) François Perrodo	1:33.717	+2,990	17
18	LMP2 Pro/Am	24	(United Kingdom) Nielsen Racing	(United States) John Falb	1:33.919	+3,192	18
19	LMP2 Pro/Am	21	(United Kingdom) United Autosports	(Brazil) Daniel Schneider	1:34.500	+3,773	19
20	LMP2 Pro/Am	19	(Poland) Team Virage	(Greece) Georgios Kolovos	1:34.996	+4,269	20
21	LMP2 Pro/Am	20	(Portugal) Algarve Pro Racing	(Greece) Kriton Lendoudis	1:35.894	+5,167	21
22	LMP2 Pro/Am	3	(Luxembourg) DKR Engineering	(Australia) Andres Latorre Canon	1:36.977	+6,250	22
23	**LMP3**	**17**	**(Switzerland) COOL Racing**	**(Portugal) Manuel Espírito Santo**	**1:37.498**	**+6,771**	23
24	LMP3	4	(Luxembourg) DKR Engineering	(United States) Wyatt Brichacek	1:38.104	+7,377	24
25	LMP3	12	(Germany) WTM by Rinaldi Racing	(Colombia) Óscar Tunjo	1:38.195	+7,468	25
26	LMP3	88	(Poland) Inter Europol Competition	(Portugal) Pedro Perino	1:38.325	+7,598	26
27	LMP3	35	(France) Ultimate	(France) Jean-Baptiste Lahaye	1:38.440	+7,713	27
28	LMP3	15	(United Kingdom) RLR M Sport	(France) Gaël Julien	1:38.472	+7,745	28
29	LMP3	5	(United Kingdom) RLR M Sport	(United Kingdom) Bailey Voisin	1:38.657	+7,930	29
30	LMP3	31	(Switzerland) Racing Spirit of Léman	(France) Antoine Doquin	1:38.736	+8,009	30
31	LMP3	8	(Poland) Team Virage	(France) Gillian Henrion	1:38.989	+8,262	31
32	LMP3	11	(Italy) Eurointernational	(Canada) Adam Ali	1:39.349	+8,622	32
33	**LMGT3**	**85**	**(Italy) Iron Dames**	**(Belgium) Sarah Bovy**	**1:42.408**	**+11,681**	33
34	LMGT3	50	(Denmark) Formula Racing	(Denmark) Johnny Laursen	1:43.377	+12,650	37 (Note: The No. 50 Formula Racing was moved 3 places back on the starting grid for exiting pit lane with the red light on in the Free Practice 2.)
35	LMGT3	97	(United Kingdom) Grid Motorsport by TF	(Singapore) Martin Berry	1:43.411	+12,684	34
36	LMGT3	59	(Switzerland) Racing Spirit of Léman	(United States) Derek DeBoer	1:43.586	+12,859	35
37	LMGT3	63	(Italy) Iron Lynx	(Japan) Hiroshi Hamaguchi	1:43.810	+13,083	36
38	LMGT3	55	(Switzerland) Spirit of Race	(United Kingdom) Duncan Cameron	1:43.850	+13,123	41 (Note: The No. 55 Spirit of Race was moved 3 places back on the grid for causing a collision with the No. 28 IDEC Sport during previous race.)
39	LMGT3	51	(Italy) AF Corse	(France) Charles-Henri Samani	1:44.160	+13,433	38
40	LMGT3	66	(United Kingdom) JMW Motorsport	(United States) Scott Noble	1:44.447	+13,720	39
41	LMGT3	57	(Switzerland) Kessel Racing	(Japan) Takeshi Kimura	1:44.679	+13,952	40
42	LMGT3	60	(Germany) Proton Competition	(Italy) Claudio Schiavoni	1:44.961	+14,234	42
43	LMGT3	86	(United Kingdom) GR Racing	(United Kingdom) Michael Wainwright	1:45.435	+14,708	43

== Race ==
=== Race result ===
The minimum number of laps for classification (70% of overall winning car's distance) was 88 laps. Class winners are marked in bold.

Final Classification
Pos	Class	No	Team	Drivers	Car	Tyres	Laps	Time/Gap
1	**LMP2**	**37**	**(Switzerland) COOL Racing**	**(Spain) Lorenzo Fluxá (Denmark) Malthe Jakobsen (Japan) Ritomo Miyata**	**Oreca 07**	G	**127**	**4:00:20.026**
2	LMP2	14	(United States) AO by TF	(United Kingdom) Jonny Edgar (Switzerland) Louis Delétraz (Poland) Robert Kubica	Oreca 07	G	127	+2.499
3	LMP2	47	(Switzerland) COOL Racing	(Thailand) Carl Bennett (Austria) Ferdinand Habsburg (Denmark) Frederik Vesti	Oreca 07	G	127	+3.159
4	LMP2	43	(Poland) Inter Europol Competition	(Mexico) Sebastián Álvarez (France) Vladislav Lomko (France) Tom Dillmann	Oreca 07	G	127	+4.075
5	LMP2	34	(Poland) Inter Europol Competition	(United Kingdom) Oliver Gray (France) Clément Novalak (Italy) Luca Ghiotto	Oreca 07	G	127	+9.491
6	LMP2	23	(United Kingdom) United Autosports	(United States) Bijoy Garg (Switzerland) Fabio Scherer (United Kingdom) Paul di Resta	Oreca 07	G	127	+12.007
7	LMP2	30	(France) Duqueine Team	(Netherlands) Niels Koolen (France) Jean-Baptiste Simmenauer (Australia) James Allen	Oreca 07	G	127	+14.864
8	**LMP2 Pro/Am**	**77**	**(Germany) Proton Competition**	**(Italy) Giorgio Roda (Austria) René Binder (Netherlands) Bent Viscaal**	**Oreca 07**	G	**127**	**+16.120**
9	LMP2 Pro/Am	20	(Portugal) Algarve Pro Racing	(Greece) Kriton Lendoudis (United Kingdom) Richard Bradley (United Kingdom) Alex Quinn	Oreca 07	G	127	+17.115
10	LMP2	25	(Portugal) Algarve Pro Racing	(Liechtenstein) Matthias Kaiser (United Kingdom) Olli Caldwell (United Kingdom) Alexander Lynn	Oreca 07	G	127	+17.585
11	LMP2 Pro/Am	24	(United Kingdom) Nielsen Racing	(United States) John Falb (United Kingdom) Colin Noble (United Kingdom) Nicholas Yelloly	Oreca 07	G	127	+18.392
12	LMP2	9	(Germany) Iron Lynx – Proton	(Germany) Jonas Ried (France) Macéo Capietto (Italy) Matteo Cairoli	Oreca 07	G	127	+19.368
13	LMP2 Pro/Am	83	(Italy) AF Corse	(France) François Perrodo (France) Matthieu Vaxivière (Italy) Alessio Rovera	Oreca 07	G	127	+34.909
14	LMP2	22	(United Kingdom) United Autosports	(Romania) Filip Ugran (Japan) Marino Sato (United Kingdom) Benjamin Hanley	Oreca 07	G	127	+45.966
15	LMP2	27	(United Kingdom) Nielsen Racing	(Denmark) Benjamin Pedersen (United Kingdom) Will Stevens (France) Gabriel Aubry	Oreca 07	G	127	+49.854
16	LMP2	65	(France) Panis Racing	(United Kingdom) Manuel Maldonado (France) Charles Milesi (Monaco) Arthur Leclerc	Oreca 07	G	127	+58.579
17	LMP2 Pro/Am	29	(France) Richard Mille by TDS	(United States) Rodrigo Sales (Switzerland) Mathias Beche (Switzerland) Grégoire Saucy	Oreca 07	G	127	+1:09.361 (Note: The No. 29 Richard Mille by TDS was penalised for making a contact with the No. 83 AF Corse. The penalty was 5 seconds being added to crew's total race time.)
18	LMP2 Pro/Am	19	(Poland) Team Virage	(Greece) Georgios Kolovos (France) Raphaël Narac (France) Tristan Vautier	Oreca 07	G	126	+1 Lap
19	LMP2 Pro/Am	3	(Luxembourg) DKR Engineering	(Australia) Andres Latorre Canon (Turkey) Cem Bölükbaşı (Germany) Laurents Hörr	Oreca 07	G	125	+2 Laps
20	LMP2	28	(France) IDEC Sport	(Chile) Nicolás Pino (France) Reshad de Gerus (Netherlands) Job van Uitert	Oreca 07	G	125	+2 Laps
21	**LMP3**	**17**	**(Switzerland) COOL Racing**	**(Portugal) Miguel Cristóvão (Portugal) Manuel Espírito Santo**	**Ligier JS P320**	MI	**122**	**+5 Laps**
22	LMP3	15	(United Kingdom) RLR M Sport	(Denmark) Michael Jensen (United Kingdom) Nick Adcock (France) Gaël Julien	Ligier JS P320	MI	122	+5 Laps
23	LMP3	11	(Italy) Eurointernational	(United Kingdom) Matthew Richard Bell (Canada) Adam Ali	Ligier JS P320	MI	122	+5 Laps
24	LMP3	12	(Germany) WTM by Rinaldi Racing	(Germany) Torsten Kratz (Germany) Leonard Weiss (Colombia) Óscar Tunjo	Duqueine M30 - D08	MI	122	+5 Laps
25	LMP3	4	(Luxembourg) DKR Engineering	(Germany) Alexander Mattschull (United States) Wyatt Brichacek (Portugal) Guilherme Oliveira	Duqueine M30 - D08	MI	122	+5 Laps
26	LMP3	8	(Poland) Team Virage	(Algeria) Julien Gerbi (Portugal) Bernardo Pinheiro (Note: Bernardo Pinheiro did not drive the minimum time to score points.) (France) Gillian Henrion	Ligier JS P320	MI	122	+5 Laps
27	LMP3	5	(United Kingdom) RLR M Sport	(Canada) James Dayson (Canada) Daniel Ali (United Kingdom) Bailey Voisin	Ligier JS P320	MI	121	+6 Laps
28	**LMGT3**	**63**	**(Italy) Iron Lynx**	**(Japan) Hiroshi Hamaguchi (Zimbabwe) Axcil Jefferies (Italy) Andrea Caldarelli**	**Lamborghini Huracan LMGT3 Evo2**	G	**119**	**+8 Laps**
29	LMGT3	85	(Italy) Iron Dames	(Belgium) Sarah Bovy (Switzerland) Rahel Frey (Denmark) Michelle Gatting	Porsche 911 GT3 R LMGT3	G	119	+8 Laps
30	LMGT3	60	(Germany) Proton Competition	(Italy) Claudio Schiavoni (Italy) Matteo Cressoni (France) Julien Andlauer	Porsche 911 GT3 R LMGT3	G	119	+8 Laps
31	LMGT3	50	(Denmark) Formula Racing	(Denmark) Johnny Laursen (Denmark) Conrad Laursen	Ferrari 296 LMGT3	G	119	+8 Laps
32	LMGT3	57	(Switzerland) Kessel Racing	(Japan) Takeshi Kimura (France) Esteban Masson (Brazil) Daniel Serra	Ferrari 296 LMGT3	G	119	+8 Laps
33	LMGT3	86	(United Kingdom) GR Racing	(United Kingdom) Michael Wainwright (Italy) Riccardo Pera (Italy) Davide Rigon	Ferrari 296 LMGT3	G	119	+8 Laps
34	LMGT3	55	(Switzerland) Spirit of Race	(United Kingdom) Duncan Cameron (South Africa) David Perel (Republic of Ireland) Matt Griffin	Ferrari 296 LMGT3	G	119	+8 Laps
35	LMGT3	97	(United Kingdom) Grid Motorsport by TF	(Singapore) Martin Berry (United Kingdom) Lorcan Hanafin (United Kingdom) Jonathan Adam	Aston Martin Vantage AMR LMGT3	G	119	+8 Laps
36	LMGT3	59	(Switzerland) Racing Spirit of Léman	(United States) Derek DeBoer (United Kingdom) Casper Stevenson (France) Valentin Hasse-Clot	Aston Martin Vantage AMR LMGT3	G	118	+9 Laps
37	LMGT3	66	(United Kingdom) JMW Motorsport	(United States) Scott Noble (United States) Jason Hart (United Kingdom) Ben Tuck	Ferrari 296 LMGT3	G	118	+9 Laps
Not classified
	LMP3	88	(Poland) Inter Europol Competition	(United Arab Emirates) Alexander Bukhantsov (United Kingdom) Kai Askey (Portugal) Pedro Perino	Ligier JS P320	MI	111	
	LMP2	10	(United Kingdom) Vector Sport	(United Kingdom) Ryan Cullen (Monaco) Stéphane Richelmi (Brazil) Felipe Drugovich	Oreca 07	G	108	
	LMP3	31	(Switzerland) Racing Spirit of Léman	(France) Jacques Wolff (France) Jean-Ludovic Foubert (France) Antoine Doquin	Ligier JS P320	MI	88	
	LMP2 Pro/Am	21	(United Kingdom) United Autosports	(Brazil) Daniel Schneider (United Kingdom) Andrew Meyrick (United Kingdom) Oliver Jarvis	Oreca 07	G	83	
	LMP3	35	(France) Ultimate	(France) François Heriau (France) Jean-Baptiste Lahaye (France) Matthieu Lahaye	Ligier JS P320	MI	61	
	LMGT3	51	(Italy) AF Corse	(France) Charles-Henri Samani (France) Emmanuel Collard (Argentina) Nicolás Varrone	Ferrari 296 LMGT3	G	0	

=== Statistics ===
==== Fastest lap ====
Class	Driver	Team	Time	Lap
LMP2	(United Kingdom) Alexander Lynn	(Portugal) #25 Algarve Pro Racing	1:32.451	120
LMP2 Pro/Am	(Switzerland) Grégoire Saucy	(France) #29 Richard Mille by TDS	1:33.400	47
LMP3	(Portugal) Manuel Espírito Santo	(Switzerland) #17 COOL Racing	1:39.892	106
LMGTE	(United Kingdom) Jonathan Adam	(United Kingdom) #97 Grid Motorsport by TF	1:42.916	114
