= Gaël Julien =

French racing driver (born 2005)

Gael Julien
- Nationality: (France) French
- Born: 30 November 2005 (age 20) Jakarta, Indonesia

European Le Mans Series career
- Debut season: 2023
- Current team: RLR MSport
- Categorisation: FIA Silver
- Car number: 15
- Starts: 12 (12 entries)
- Wins: 1
- Podiums: 3
- Poles: 2
- Fastest laps: 1
- Best finish: 1st (LMP3) in 2024

Previous series
- 2022 2021: F4 Spanish Championship; French F4 Championship

Championship titles
- 2024: European Le Mans Series - LMP3

Gael Julien (born 30 November 2005) is a French-Malagasy racing driver. He is the 2024 European Le Mans Series champion in the LMP3 class with RLR MSport. Previously, Julien became a race winner in the French F4 Championship.

== Early career ==
Having discovered karting at the age of seven, Julien won titles in various Asian countries, as well as taking home the 2019 Rok Cup Asia in the junior class. He made his car racing debut in 2021, taking part in French F4. With one win at Lédenon, Julien finished seventh in the standings.

For the 2022 season, Julien switched to compete in Spanish F4, where he would race for Drivex School. He finished 11th in the championship, beating both of his full-time teammates and scoring a podium in Valencia.

At the end of the year, Julien took part in an evaluation for the Ferrari Driver Academy as a selected candidate of the Asia Pacific & Oceania regional selection programme, representing Indonesia.

== Sportscar career ==
2023 marked the start of Julien's time in sportscar racing, as the Frenchman moved to RLR MSport, partnering Horst Felbermayr Jr. and Mateusz Kaprzyk in the LMP3 class of the European Le Mans Series. Scoring points in all six races, Julien highlighted his campaign with a pole position in mixed weather conditions at Portimão, which led the team towards a seventh place in the standings.

The following year, Julien remained with RLR in ELMS, this time partnering the bronze-ranked pair of Nick Adcock and Michael Jensen. Following a fourth place in Barcelona, the French driver would take his first pole position of the year at his home track in Le Castellet. Thanks to a well-judged fuel saving strategy which saw RLR have to make one less stop than its rivals, Julien would cross the line to take his first victory in endurance racing.

== Personal life ==
During his childhood, Julien and his parents lived in Jakarta, the capital of Indonesia.

== Racing record ==
=== Racing career summary ===
Season	Series	Team	Races	Wins	Poles	F/Laps	Podiums	Points	Position
2021	French F4 Championship	FFSA Academy	21	1	1	1	4	141	7th
2022	F4 Spanish Championship	Drivex School	21	0	0	0	1	60	11th
2023	European Le Mans Series - LMP3	RLR MSport	6	0	1	0	0	51	7th
2024	European Le Mans Series - LMP3	RLR MSport	6	1	2	1	3	99	**1st**
2024	Ultimate Cup Series - Proto NP02	Graff Racing	1	0	1	0	1	18	25th
2025	Le Mans Cup - LMP3	High Class Racing	2	0	1	0	0	1	32nd
2025	European Sprint Prototype Cup	Graff Racing	2	0	0	0	1	15	21st
2026	Le Mans Cup - LMP3	Nielsen Racing	1	0	0	0	0	0	32nd
2026	Le Mans Cup - LMP3	High Class Racing	1	0	0	0	0	0	32nd

^{*} Season still in progress.

=== Complete French F4 Championship results ===
(key) (Races in bold indicate pole position) (Races in italics indicate fastest lap)

Year	1	2	3	4	5	6	7	8	9	10	11	12	13	14	15	16	17	18	19	20	21	Pos	Points
2021	NOG; 1; 7	NOG; 2; 3	NOG; 3; 5	MAG1; 1; 7	MAG1; 2; 6	MAG1; 3 Ret	HUN; 1; 7	HUN; 2; 3	HUN; 3; 5	LÉD; 1; 5	LÉD; 2; 13	**LÉD**; **3**; 1	MNZ; 1; 5	MNZ; 2; 8	MNZ; 3 C	LEC; 1; 6	LEC; 2; 7	LEC; 3 Ret	MAG2; 1; 4	MAG2; 2; 3	MAG2; 3 Ret	7th	141

=== Complete F4 Spanish Championship results ===
(key) (Races in bold indicate pole position) (Races in italics indicate fastest lap)

Year	Team	1	2	3	4	5	6	7	8	9	10	11	12	13	14	15	16	17	18	19	20	21	DC	Points
2022	Drivex School	ALG; 1; 8	ALG; 2 Ret	ALG; 3; 15	JER; 1; 11	JER; 2; 11	JER; 3; 5	CRT; 1; 4	CRT; 2; 2	CRT; 3; 8	SPA; 1; 8	SPA; 2; 9	SPA; 3; 10	ARA; 1; 19†	ARA; 2; 14	ARA; 3; 19	NAV; 1; 5	NAV; 2; 8	NAV; 3; 10	CAT; 1 Ret	CAT; 2; 14	CAT; 3; 12	11th	60

=== Complete European Le Mans Series results ===
(key) (Races in bold indicate pole position; results in italics indicate fastest lap)

Year	Entrant	Class	Chassis	Engine	1	2	3	4	5	6	Rank	Points
2023	RLR MSport	LMP3	Ligier JS P320	Nissan VK56DE 5.6L V8	CAT; 9	LEC; 4	ARA; 4	SPA; 6	PRT; 6	**ALG**; 6	7th	51
2024	RLR MSport	LMP3	Ligier JS P320	Nissan VK56DE 5.6L V8	CAT; 4	**LEC**; 1	IMO; 4	**SPA**; 4	MUG; 2	ALG; 2	1st	99

=== Complete Le Mans Cup results ===
(key) (Races in bold indicate pole position; results in italics indicate fastest lap)

Year	Entrant	No.	Car	Class	1	2	3	4	5	6	Pos	Points
2025	High Class Racing	LMP3 Pro-Am	Ligier JS P325	CAT	LEC	LMS; 1	LMS; 2	SPA	**SIL**; DSQ	ALG; Ret	32nd	1
2026	Nielsen Racing	LMP3	Duqueine D09	BAR	LEC	LMS; 11	SPA	SIL			32nd	0
2026	High Class Racing	LMP3	Ligier JS P325						POR; 14		32nd	0
