= 2023 Ligier European Series =

The 2023 Ligier European Series was the fourth season of the Ligier European Series. The six–event season began at Circuit de Barcelona–Catalunya on 21 April, and ended at Algarve International Circuit on 21 October.

== Calendar ==
Round	Race	Circuit	Date	Map of circuit locations
1	Barcelona Heat	(Spain) Circuit de Barcelona–Catalunya	21–22 April	2023 Ligier European Series is located in Europe
2	Le Mans Heat	(France) Circuit de la Sarthe	4 June	2023 Ligier European Series is located in Europe
3	Le Castellet Heat	(France) Circuit Paul Ricard	14–15 July	2023 Ligier European Series is located in Europe
4	Aragón Heat	(Spain) MotorLand Aragón	25–26 August	2023 Ligier European Series is located in Europe
5	Spa–Francorchamps Heat	(Belgium) Circuit de Spa–Francorchamps	22–23 September	2023 Ligier European Series is located in Europe
6	Portimao Heat	(Portugal) Algarve International Circuit	20–21 October	2023 Ligier European Series is located in Europe

== Entries ==
=== Teams and drivers ===
Team	No.	Drivers	Rounds
JS P4
(Poland) Team Virage	1	(United States) Lance Fenton	All
(Poland) Team Virage	1	(United States) Kevin Madsen	All
(Poland) Team Virage	48	(Romania) Mihnea Ștefan	All
(Poland) Team Virage	60	(Portugal) Bernardo Pinheiro	All
(Poland) Team Virage	60	(United Kingdom) George King	All
(Italy) HPRacing by Monza Garage	4	(Greece) Georgios–Periklis Kolovos	1, 4, 6
(Italy) HPRacing by Monza Garage	4	(Greece) Kaitatzis Panagiotis	1, 4, 6
(Italy) HPRacing by Monza Garage	4	(Australia) James Winslow	2
(Italy) HPRacing by Monza Garage	4	(Italy) Nicola Cazzaniga	3
(Italy) HPRacing by Monza Garage	4	(Italy) Daniele Cazzaniga	3
(Italy) HPRacing by Monza Garage	4	(Italy) Jacopo Faccioni	5
(Italy) HPRacing by Monza Garage	4	(Italy) Ronnie Valori	5
(Romania) Smart Driving	5	(Australia) Dylan Young	3, 5
(Romania) Smart Driving	5	(Morocco) Moulay El Alaoui	3
(Romania) Smart Driving	5	(Italy) Davide Amaduzzi	5
(Italy) LR Motorsport	7	(Italy) Simone Riccitelli	All
(Italy) LR Motorsport	7	(Switzerland) Jacopo Mazza	All
(Italy) Monza Garage	11	(Taiwan) Wang Ray Yu	All
(Italy) Monza Garage	11	(Taiwan) Chun-Ting Chou	All
(Poland) Inter Europol Competition	14	(Canada) Fareed Ali	1, 3–4
(Poland) Inter Europol Competition	14	(Canada) Adam Ali	2
(Poland) Inter Europol Competition	14	(Canada) Daniel Ali	2
(France) Pegasus Racing	16	(Japan) Yuki Tanaka	1–2, 4–5
(France) Pegasus Racing	16	(France) David Caussanel	1, 3
(France) Pegasus Racing	16	(France) Julien Schell	4
(France) Pegasus Racing	16	(Japan) Takashi Hata	5
(France) Pegasus Racing	17	(France) Anthony Nahra	All
(France) Pegasus Racing	17	(France) Dimitri Enjalbert	All
(France) Graff Racing	39	(Switzerland) Jacopo D'Amato	2
(France) Les Deux Arbres	50	(Switzerland) Steve Zacchia	All
(France) Les Deux Arbres	50	(France) Louis Rossi	All
(United Kingdom) RLR MSport	75	(Kuwait) Haytham Qarajouli	All
(United Kingdom) RLR MSport	75	(United Kingdom) Ian Aguilera	All
JS2 R
(United Kingdom) RLR MSport	10	(United Kingdom) Simon Butler	1–3, 5
(United Kingdom) RLR MSport	10	(Spain) Maximus Mayer	All
(United Kingdom) RLR MSport	10	(United Kingdom) Martin Rich	6
(France) DS Events	12	(France) Anthony Perrin	2
(France) TM Evolution	25	(France) Frédéric Morel	2
(France) Belt Racing by LVR	27	(France) Ewen Hachez	2
(France) Belt Racing by LVR	27	(France) Pascal Huteau	2
(France) Pegasus Racing	29	(France) Christophe Weber	1–3, 5
(France) Pegasus Racing	29	(France) Jordan Meyer	1, 4
(France) Pegasus Racing	29	(France) Julien Schell	3
(France) Pegasus Racing	29	(France) Thierry Colney	5
(France) Pegasus Racing	29	(France) Laurent Millara	6
(France) LADC Motorsport	35	(France) Christian Gisy	2
(France) LADC Motorsport	61	(France) Léo Payen	2
(France) ANS Motorsport	42	(France) Julien Lemoine	All
(Italy) LR Motorsport	43	(Italy) David Rodorigo	All
(Italy) LR Motorsport	43	(Italy) Giacomo Pollini	5
(France) MRacing	53	(France) Natan Bihel	2
(France) Extreme Limite	64	(France) Marc Bonnet	2
(France) Les Deux Arbres	86	(France) Jacques Nicolet	All
(France) Les Deux Arbres	86	(France) Bastien Ostian	4
(France) CTF Performance	95	(France) Gilles Poret	1–4
(France) CTF Performance	96	(France) Fabien Delaplace	1
(France) CTF Performance	96	(France) Laurent Piguet	1
Entrylists:

== Results ==
Bold indicates overall winner.

Rnd.		Circuit	JS P4 Winning Team	JS2 R Winning Team	Results
Rnd.		Circuit	JS P4 Winning Drivers	JS2 R Winning Drivers	Results
1	R1	(Spain) Circuit de Barcelona–Catalunya	**(Poland) No. 48 Team Virage**	(Italy) No. 43 LR Motorsport	Race results
1	R1	(Spain) Circuit de Barcelona–Catalunya	(Romania) **Mihnea Ștefan**	(Italy) David Rodorigo	Race results
1	R2	(Spain) Circuit de Barcelona–Catalunya	**(Poland) No. 48 Team Virage**	(France) No. 95 CTF Performance	Race results
1	R2	(Spain) Circuit de Barcelona–Catalunya	(Romania) **Mihnea Ștefan**	(France) Gilles Poret	Race results
2	R1	(France) Circuit de la Sarthe	**(Poland) No. 1 Team Virage**	(France) No. 53 MRacing	Race results
2	R1	(France) Circuit de la Sarthe	**(United States) Lance Fenton** **(United States) Kevin Madsen**	(France) Natan Bihel	Race results
3	R1	(France) Circuit Paul Ricard	**(Poland) No. 48 Team Virage**	(France) No. 42 ANS Motorsport	Race results
3	R1	(France) Circuit Paul Ricard	(Romania) **Mihnea Ștefan**	(France) Julien Lemoine	Race results
3	R2	(France) Circuit Paul Ricard	**(Poland) No. 48 Team Virage**	(France) No. 42 ANS Motorsport	Race results
3	R2	(France) Circuit Paul Ricard	(Romania) **Mihnea Ștefan**	(France) Julien Lemoine	Race results
4	R1	(Spain) MotorLand Aragón	**(Italy) No. 4 HPRacing by Monza Garage**	(France) No. 42 ANS Motorsport	Race results
4	R1	(Spain) MotorLand Aragón	**(Greece) Georgios–Periklis Kolovos** **(Greece) Kaitatzis Panagiotis**	(France) Julien Lemoine	Race results
4	R2	(Spain) MotorLand Aragón	**(Poland) No. 48 Team Virage**	(United Kingdom) No. 10 RLR MSport	Race results
4	R2	(Spain) MotorLand Aragón	(Romania) **Mihnea Ștefan**	(Spain) Maximus Mayer	Race results
5	R1	(Belgium) Circuit de Spa-Francorchamps	**(Poland) No. 48 Team Virage**	(France) No. 42 ANS Motorsport	Race results
5	R1	(Belgium) Circuit de Spa-Francorchamps	(Romania) **Mihnea Ștefan**	(France) Julien Lemoine	Race results
5	R2	(Belgium) Circuit de Spa-Francorchamps	**(Poland) No. 60 Team Virage**	(France) No. 42 ANS Motorsport	Race results
5	R2	(Belgium) Circuit de Spa-Francorchamps	**(Portugal) Bernardo Pinheiro** **(United Kingdom) George King**	(France) Julien Lemoine	Race results
6	R1	(Portugal) Algarve International Circuit	**(Poland) No. 48 Team Virage**	(France) No. 42 ANS Motorsport	Race results
6	R1	(Portugal) Algarve International Circuit	(Romania) **Mihnea Ștefan**	(France) Julien Lemoine	Race results
6	R2	(Portugal) Algarve International Circuit	**(Poland) No. 60 Team Virage**	(France) No. 42 ANS Motorsport	Race results
6	R2	(Portugal) Algarve International Circuit	**(Portugal) Bernardo Pinheiro** **(United Kingdom) George King**	(France) Julien Lemoine	Race results

== Championships ==
=== JS P4 Drivers ===
Pos.	Driver	Team	CAT (Spain)		LMS (France)	LEC (France)		ARA (Spain)		SPA (Belgium)		POR (Portugal)		Points
Pos.	Driver	Team	R1	R2	R1	R1	R2	R1	R2	R1	R2	R1	R2	Points
1	(Romania) Mihnea Ștefan	(Poland) Team Virage	1	1	7	1	1	6	1	1	3	1	4	216
2	(Portugal) Bernardo Pinheiro (United Kingdom) George King	(Poland) Team Virage	2	2	Ret	2	2	Ret	3	4	1	2	1	167
3	(Italy) Simone Riccitelli (Switzerland) Jacopo Mazza	(Italy) LR Motorsport	4	5	2	Ret	4	3	2	7	2	6	2	135
4	(Kuwait) Haytham Qarajouli (United Kingdom) Ian Aguilera	(United Kingdom) RLR MSport	3	6	8	6	3	4	4	5	4	4	5	118
5	(Switzerland) Steve Zacchia (France) Louis Rossi	(France) Les Deux Arbres	6	3	10	3	11	2	Ret	3	7	5	3	103
6	(United States) Lance Fenton (United States) Kevin Madsen	(Poland) Team Virage	5	8	1	5	5	5	6	6	10	9	8	92
7	(France) Anthony Nahra (France) Dimitri Enjalbert	(France) Pegasus Racing	7	4	3	4	8	Ret	Ret	8	6	8	6	73
8	(Greece) Georgios–Periklis Kolovos (Greece) Kaitatzis Panagiotis	(Italy) HPRacing by Monza Garage	10	9				1	7			3	DSQ	49
9	(Taiwan) Wang Ray Yu	(Italy) Monza Garage	8	Ret	6	7	10	Ret	5	Ret	9	7	7	43
10	(Taiwan) Chun-Ting Chou	(Italy) Monza Garage	WD	WD	6	7	10	Ret	5	Ret	9	7	7	39
11	(Italy) Jacopo Faccioni (Italy) Ronnie Valori	(Italy) HPRacing by Monza Garage								2	5			28
12	(Japan) Yuki Tanaka	(France) Pegasus Racing	9	7	5			Ret	Ret	WD	WD			18
13	(France) David Caussanel	(France) Pegasus Racing	9	7		9	6							18
14	(Australia) Dylan Young	(Romania) Smart Driving				8	7			9	8			16
15	(Switzerland) Jacopo D'Amato	(France) Graff Racing			4									12
16	(Morocco) Moulay El Alaoui	(Romania) Smart Driving				8	7							10
17	(Canada) Fareed Ali	(Poland) Inter Europol Competition	Ret	WD		10	12	7	Ret					7
18	(Italy) Davide Amaduzzi	(Romania) Smart Driving								9	8			6
19	(Italy) Nicola Cazzaniga (Italy) Daniele Cazzaniga	(Italy) HPRacing by Monza Garage				Ret	9							2
20	(Canada) Adam Ali (Canada) Daniel Ali	(Poland) Inter Europol Competition			9									2
–	(Australia) James Winslow	(Italy) HPRacing by Monza Garage			Ret									0
–	(France) Julien Schell	(France) Pegasus Racing						Ret	Ret					0
–	(Japan) Takashi Hata	(France) Pegasus Racing								WD	WD			0

=== JS2 R Drivers ===
Pos.	Driver	Team	CAT (Spain)		LMS (France)	LEC (France)		ARA (Spain)		SPA (Belgium)		POR (Portugal)		Points
Pos.	Driver	Team	R1	R2	R1	R1	R2	R1	R2	R1	R2	R1	R2	Points
1	(France) Julien Lemoine	(France) ANS Motorsport	2	2	2	1	1	1	Ret	1	1	1	1	229
2	(Italy) David Rodorigo	(Italy) LR Motorsport	1	3	3	2	2	3	3	5	4	3	3	181
3	(Spain) Maximus Mayer	(United Kingdom) RLR MSport	6	Ret	9	3	3	Ret	1	2	2	2	2	137
4	(France) Jacques Nicolet	(France) Les Deux Arbres	5	5	7	4	4	3	2	3	3	4	4	137
5	(United Kingdom) Simon Butler	(United Kingdom) RLR MSport	6	Ret	9	3	3			2	2			76
6	(France) Christophe Weber	(France) Pegasus Racing	7	6	10	5	5			4	5			57
7	(France) Gilles Poret	(France) CTF Performance	4	1	6	6	Ret	WD	WD					53
8	(United Kingdom) Martin Rich	(United Kingdom) RLR MSport										2	2	36
9	(France) Bastien Ostian	(France) Les Deux Arbres						3	2					33
10	(France) Fabien Delaplace (France) Laurent Piguet	(France) CTF Performance	3	4										27
11	(France) Jordan Meyer	(France) Pegasus Racing	7	6				4	Ret					26
12	(France) Natan Bihel	(France) MRacing			1									25
13	(France) Thierry Colney	(France) Pegasus Racing								4	5			22
14	(Italy) Giacomo Pollini	(Italy) LR Motorsport								5	4			22
15	(France) Julien Schell	(France) Pegasus Racing				5	5							20
16	(France) Laurent Millara	(France) Pegasus Racing										5	5	20
17	(France) Ewen Hachez (France) Pascal Huteau	(France) Belt Racing by LVR			4									12
18	(France) Frédéric Morel	(France) TM Evolution			5									10
19	(France) Anthony Perrin	(France) DS Events			8									4
–	(France) Christian Gisy	(France) LADC Motorsport			Ret									0
–	(France) Léo Payen	(France) LADC Motorsport			Ret									0
–	(France) Marc Bonnet	(France) Extreme Limite			Ret									0

=== JS P4 Teams ===
Pos.	Team	CAT (Spain)		LMS (France)	LEC (France)		ARA (Spain)		SPA (Belgium)		POR (Portugal)		Points
Pos.	Team	R1	R2	R1	R1	R2	R1	R2	R1	R2	R1	R2	Points
1	(Poland) #48 Team Virage	1	1	7	1	1	6	1	1	3	1	4	216
2	(Poland) #60 Team Virage	2	2	Ret	2	2	Ret	3	4	1	2	1	167
3	(Italy) #7 LR Motorsport	4	5	2	Ret	4	3	2	7	2	6	2	135
4	(United Kingdom) #75 RLR MSport	3	6	8	6	3	4	4	5	4	4	5	118
5	(France) #50 Les Deux Arbres	6	3	10	3	11	2	Ret	3	7	5	3	103
6	(Poland) #1 Team Virage	5	8	1	5	5	5	6	6	10	9	8	92
7	(Italy) #4 HPRacing by Monza Garage	10	9	Ret	Ret	9	1	7	2	5	3	DSQ	79
8	(France) #17 Pegasus Racing	7	4	3	4	8	Ret	Ret	8	6	8	6	73
9	(Italy) #11 Monza Garage	8	Ret	6	7	10	Ret	5	Ret	9	7	7	43
10	(France) #16 Pegasus Racing	9	7	5	9	6	Ret	Ret	WD	WD			28
11	(Romania) #5 Smart Driving				8	7			9	8			16
12	(France) #39 Graff Racing			4									12
13	(Poland) #14 Inter Europol Competition	Ret	WD	9	10	12	7	Ret					9

=== JS2 R Teams ===
Pos.	Team	CAT (Spain)		LMS (France)	LEC (France)		ARA (Spain)		SPA (Belgium)		POR (Portugal)		Points
Pos.	Team	R1	R2	R1	R1	R2	R1	R2	R1	R2	R1	R2	Points
1	(France) #42 ANS Motorsport	2	2	2	1	1	1	Ret	1	1	1	1	229
2	(Italy) #43 LR Motorsport	1	3	3	2	2	2	3	5	4	3	3	181
3	(United Kingdom) #10 RLR MSport	6	Ret	9	3	3	Ret	1	2	2	2	2	137
4	(France) #86 Les Deux Arbres	5	5	7	4	4	3	2	3	3	4	4	137
5	(France) #29 Pegasus Racing	7	6	10	5	5	4	Ret	4	5	5	5	89
6	(France) #95 CTF Performance	4	1	6	6	Ret	WD	WD					53
7	(France) #96 CTF Performance	3	4				WD	WD					27
8	(France) #53 MRacing			1									25
9	(France) #27 Belt Racing by LVR			4									12
10	(France) #25 TM Evolution			5									10
11	(France) #12 DS Events			8									4
–	(France) #35 LADC Motorsport			Ret									0
–	(France) #61 LADC Motorsport			Ret									0
–	(France) #64 Extreme Limite			Ret									0
