= Adam Ali (racing driver) =

Canadian racing driver (born 1994)

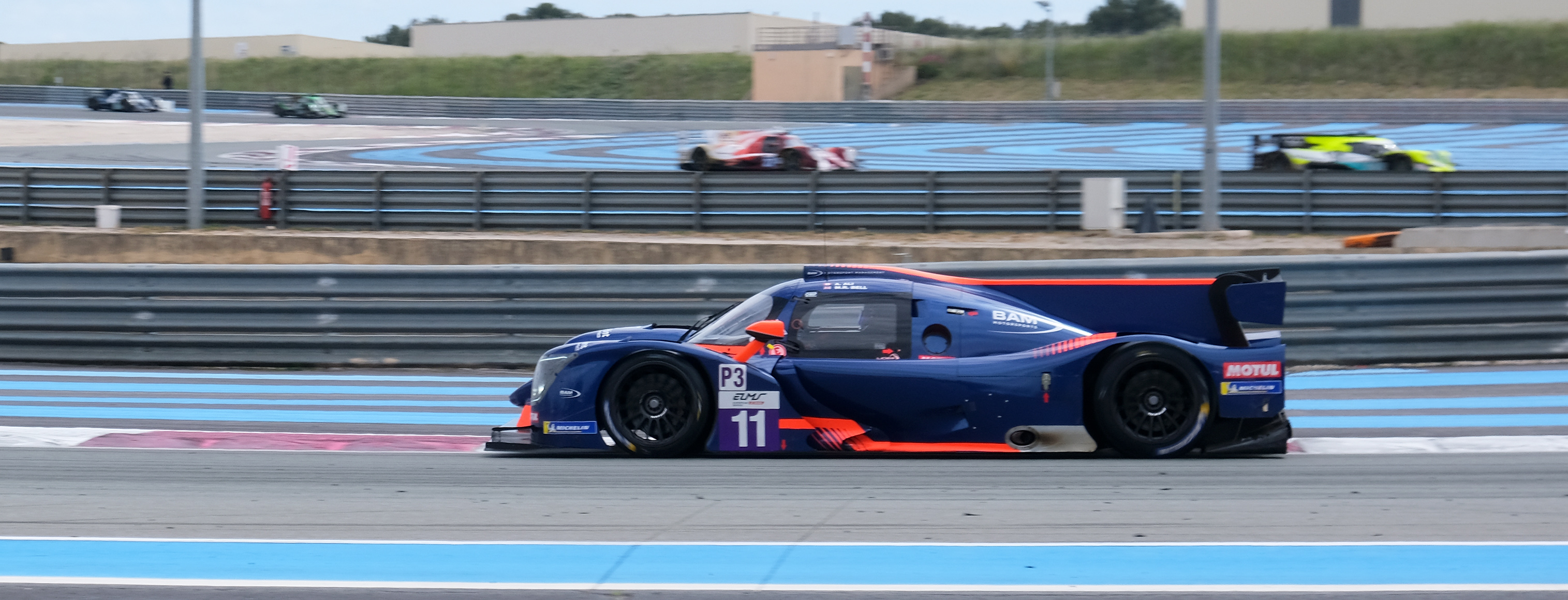
- Nationality: (Canada) Canadian
- Born: 11 July 2004 (age 22) Toronto, Canada

European Le Mans Series career
- Debut season: 2023
- Current team: EuroInternational
- Categorisation: FIA Silver
- Car number: 11
- Starts: 11 (11 entries)
- Wins: 3
- Podiums: 5
- Poles: 0
- Fastest laps: 0
- Best finish: 2nd in 2023

Previous series
- 2023 2023: Ligier European Series - JS P4; Asian Le Mans Series - LMP3

Adam Ali (born 11 July 2004) is a Canadian racing driver. He currently competes for EuroInternational in the LMP3 class of the European Le Mans Series.

== Career ==
Ali competed in karting during his formative years, most notably winning the Canadian National Championship and representing his nation at the 2021 Rotax World Finals. He moved into race cars in 2022, first testing a Ligier JS P320 at Vallelunga with the Inter Europol Competition team with the coaching of category stalwart Colin Noble, alongside whom Ali was scheduled to make his debut at the Petit Le Mans event. However, the team withdrew prior to the weekend.

Ali's debut would come at the start of 2023, where he took part in the Asian Le Mans Series for Inter Europol. Having initially been joined by brother Daniel and bronze-ranked James Dayson, the former would be replaced with John Schauerman prior to the commencement of the campaign. The lineup struggled during the four races, failing to score a single point and finishing last in the LMP3 standings. Ali raced in the European Le Mans Series for the remainder of 2023, partnering Matthew Richard Bell at EuroInternational. In a season dominated by the No. 17 of Cool Racing, Ali and Bell were able to establish themselves as consistent points scorers, even taking a podium at Spa where Bell led for a large part of the event. The highlight of the year came at Portimão in a race majorly affected by wet conditions; Bell created a gap at the front which Ali consolidated to take his first win in car racing. This result earned the No. 11 second place in the LMP3 standings.

For the following year, Ali and Bell remained at EuroInternational in the ELMS. After scoring a podium during the season opener in Spain, the pair finished fourth in France and won at Imola, with Ali pulling away from Jean-Baptiste Lahaye in the final stint. In Spa, Ali was spun into the gravel at Les Combes during a safety car restart, but was able to recover with the help of another safety car. Through a good strategy by EuroInternational Ali was able to move into the lead, winning for a second successive time.

== Racing record ==
=== Racing career summary ===
Season	Series	Team	Races	Wins	Poles	F/Laps	Podiums	Points	Position
2023	European Le Mans Series - LMP3	EuroInternational	6	1	0	0	2	70	**2nd**
2023	Asian Le Mans Series - LMP3	Inter Europol Competition	4	0	0	0	0	0	17th
2023	Ligier European Series - JS P4	Inter Europol Competition	1	0	0	0	0	2	20th
2024	European Le Mans Series - LMP3	EuroInternational	6	2	0	0	4	98	**2nd**
2024	Ultimate Cup Series - Proto P3	EuroInternational	1	0	0	0	0	4	47th
2025	GT World Challenge Europe Endurance Cup	Barwell Motorsport	3	0	0	0	0	0	NC
2025	GT World Challenge Europe Endurance Cup	Steller Motorsport	1	0	0	0	0	0	NC
2025	International GT Open	Steller Motorsport	2	0	0	0	0	0	54th

*Season still in progress.

=== Complete Asian Le Mans Series results ===
(key) (Races in bold indicate pole position) (Races in italics indicate fastest lap)

Year	Team	Class	Car	Engine	1	2	3	4	Pos.	Points
2023	Inter Europol Competition	LMP3	Ligier JS P320	Nissan VK56DE 5.6L V8	DUB; 1; 11	DUB; 2; 11	ABU; 1; 12	ABU; 2 Ret	17th	0

=== Complete European Le Mans Series results ===
(key) (Races in bold indicate pole position; results in italics indicate fastest lap)

Year	Entrant	Class	Chassis	Engine	1	2	3	4	5	6	Rank	Points
2023	EuroInternational	LMP3	Ligier JS P320	Nissan VK56DE 5.6L V8	CAT; 4	LEC; 7	ARA; 5	SPA; 3	PRT; 9	ALG; 1	2nd	70
2024	EuroInternational	LMP3	Ligier JS P320	Nissan VK56DE 5.6L V8	CAT; 3	LEC; 4	IMO; 1	SPA; 1	MUG; 7	ALG; 3	2nd	98

^{*} Season still in progress.
