= Mihnea Ștefan =

Romanian racing driver

Ioan Mihnea Ștefan
- Nationality: (Romania) Romanian
- Born: Ioan Mihnea Ștefan; 4 January 1997 (age 29) Târgoviște, Romania

Le Mans Cup career
- Debut season: 2024
- Current team: Team Virage
- Categorisation: FIA Silver
- Car number: 44
- Starts: 0 (0 entries)
- Wins: 0
- Podiums: 0
- Poles: 0
- Fastest laps: 0

Previous series
- 2023–24 2022–2023 2012: Asian Le Mans Series; Ligier European Series; Formula BMW Talent Cup

Championship titles
- 2023: Ligier European Series

Ioan Mihnea Ștefan (born 4 January 1997) is a Romanian race car driver who last compated in the Michelin Le Mans Cup with Team Virage. He is the 2023 Ligier European Series champion.

== Karting record ==
=== Karting career summary ===
Season	Series	Team	Position
2008	38° Torneo Industrie - Minikart	Lenzokart	11th
2008	Euro Trophy by 60 Mini		10th
2010	South East European Karting Zone - KF3		6th
2011	WSK Master Series - KF3		37th

== Racing record ==
=== Racing career summary ===
Season	Series	Team	Races	Wins	Poles	F/Laps	Podiums	Points	Position
2012	Formula BMW Talent Cup		3	0	0	0	2	41	**3rd**
2022	Ligier European Series - JS P4	Smart Driving	2	0	0	0	1	23	11th
2023	Ligier European Series - JS P4	Team Virage	11	7	0	0	8	216	**1st**
2023	Ultimate Cup Series - Proto P3	Team Virage	2	0	1	1	1	36	13th
2023-24	Asian Le Mans Series - LMP3	Bretton Racing	5	1	0	0	3	82	**3rd**
2024	Le Mans Cup - LMP3	Team Virage	7	0	0	0	1	21.5	11th

* Season still in progress.

=== Complete Ligier European Series results ===
(key) (Races in bold indicate pole position; results in italics indicate fastest lap)

Year	Entrant	Class	Chassis	1	2	3	4	5	6	7	8	9	10	11	12	Rank	Points
2022	Smart Driving	JS P4	Ligier JS P4	LEC; 1	LEC; 2	IMO; 1	IMO; 2	LMS; 1	LMS; 2	MNZ; 1	MNZ; 2	SPA; 1	SPA; 2	ALG; 1; 3	ALG; 2; 6	6th	23
2023	Team Virage	JS P4	Ligier JS P4	CAT; 1; 1	CAT; 2; 1	LMS; 7	LEC; 1; 1	LEC; 2; 1	ARA; 1; 6	ARA; 2; 1	SPA; 1; 1	SPA; 2; 3	POR; 2; 1	POR; 1; 4		1st	216

=== Complete Asian Le Mans Series results ===
(key) (Races in bold indicate pole position) (Races in italics indicate fastest lap)

Year	Team	Class	Car	Engine	1	2	3	4	5	Pos.	Points
2023–24	Bretton Racing	LMP3	Ligier JS P320	Nissan VK56DE 5.6 L V8	SEP; 1; 3	SEP; 2; 2	DUB; 4	ABU; 1; 4	ABU; 2; 1	3rd	82

=== Complete Le Mans Cup results ===
(key) (Races in bold indicate pole position; results in italics indicate fastest lap)

Year	Entrant	Class	Chassis	1	2	3	4	5	6	7	Rank	Points
2024	Team Virage	LMP3	Ligier JS P320	CAT; Ret	LEC; 2	LMS; 1; 10	LMS; 2; 19	SPA; 16	MUG; 12	ALG; 10	11th	21.5
