= 2024 4 Hours of Barcelona =

Endurance sportscar racing event

The layout of the Circuit de Barcelona-Catalunya

The 2024 4 Hours of Barcelona was an endurance sportscar racing event held between 12 and 14 April 2024, as the first round of 2024 European Le Mans Series season.

== Entry list ==
The pre-event entry list consisted of 43 entries between 4 categories - 14 in LMP2, 8 in LMP2 Pro-Am, 10 in LMP3 and 11 in LMGT3.

Ferdinand Habsburg was replaced by Paul-Loup Chatin in the No. 47 COOL Racing. Habsburg was forced to miss this round as the result of a crash during a test at MotorLand Aragón.

== Schedule ==
Date	Time (local: CEST)	Event
Friday, 12 April	11:50	Free Practice 1
Friday, 12 April	16:20	Bronze Drivers Collective Test
Saturday, 13 April	10:10	Free Practice 2
Saturday, 13 April	14:40	Qualifying - LMGT3
Saturday, 13 April	15:05	Qualifying - LMP3
Saturday, 13 April	15:30	Qualifying - LMP2 Pro-Am
Saturday, 13 April	15:55	Qualifying - LMP2
Sunday, 14 April	11:30	Race

== Free practice ==
- Only the fastest car in each class is shown.

Free Practice 1	Class	No.	Entrant	Time
Free Practice 1	LMP2	14	(United States) AO by TF	1:28.821
Free Practice 1	LMP2 Pro/Am	21	(United Kingdom) United Autosports	1:30.026
Free Practice 1	LMP3	17	(Switzerland) COOL Racing	1:35.045
Free Practice 1	LMGT3	66	(United Kingdom) JMW Motorsport	1:40.826
Free Practice 2	Class	No.	Entrant	Time
Free Practice 2	LMP2	43	(Poland) Inter Europol Competition	1:28.413
Free Practice 2	LMP2 Pro/Am	24	(United Kingdom) Nielsen Racing	1:29.547
Free Practice 2	LMP3	8	(Poland) Team Virage	1:36.475
Free Practice 2	LMGT3	86	(United Kingdom) GR Racing	1:40.831

== Qualifying ==
Pole position winners in each class are marked in bold.

Pos	Class	No.	Team	Driver	Time	Gap	Grid
1	**LMP2**	**22**	**(United Kingdom) United Autosports**	**(United Kingdom) Ben Hanley**	**1:28.071**	—	1
2	LMP2	28	(France) IDEC Sport	(France) Reshad de Gerus	1:28.224	+0.153	2
3	LMP2	25	(Portugal) Algarve Pro Racing	(United Kingdom) Alexander Lynn	1:28.381	+0.310	3
4	LMP2	47	(Switzerland) COOL Racing	(Denmark) Frederik Vesti	1:28.476	+0.405	4
5	LMP2	37	(Switzerland) COOL Racing	(Japan) Ritomo Miyata	1:28.489	+0.418	5
6	LMP2	43	(Poland) Inter Europol Competition	(France) Tom Dillmann	1:28.498	+0.427	6
7	LMP2	34	(Poland) Inter Europol Competition	(Italy) Luca Ghiotto	1:28.522	+0.451	7
8	LMP2	23	(United Kingdom) United Autosports	(United Kingdom) Paul di Resta	1:28.651	+0.580	8
9	LMP2	65	(France) Panis Racing	(Monaco) Arthur Leclerc	1:28.683	+0.612	9
10	LMP2	14	(United States) AO by TF	(Switzerland) Louis Delétraz	1:28.726	+0.655	10
11	LMP2	27	(United Kingdom) Nielsen Racing	(United Kingdom) Will Stevens	1:28.732	+0.661	11
12	LMP2	9	(Germany) Iron Lynx – Proton	(Italy) Matteo Cairoli	1:28.897	+0.826	12
13	LMP2	30	(France) Duqueine Team	(Australia) James Allen	1:29.128	+1.057	13
14	LMP2	10	(United Kingdom) Vector Sport	(Brazil) Felipe Drugovich	1:29.153	+1.082	14
15	**LMP2 Pro/Am**	**77**	**(Germany) Proton Competition**	**(Italy) Giorgio Roda**	**1:30.816**	**+2.745**	15
16	LMP2 Pro/Am	19	(Poland) Team Virage	(United Kingdom) Anthony Wells	1:31.349	+3.278	16
17	LMP2 Pro/Am	24	(United Kingdom) Nielsen Racing	(United States) John Falb	1:31.497	+3.426	17
18	LMP2 Pro/Am	29	(France) Richard Mille by TDS	(United States) Rodrigo Sales	1:31.510	+3.439	18
19	LMP2 Pro/Am	83	(Italy) AF Corse	(France) François Perrodo	1:32.174	+4.103	19
20	LMP2 Pro/Am	21	(United Kingdom) United Autosports	(Brazil) Daniel Schneider	1:33.212	+5.141	20
21	LMP2 Pro/Am	20	(Portugal) Algarve Pro Racing	(Greece) Kriton Lendoudis	1:33.267	+5.196	21
22	**LMP3**	**17**	**(Switzerland) COOL Racing**	**(Portugal) Manuel Espírito Santo**	**1:34.761**	**+6.690**	23
23	LMP3	8	(Poland) Team Virage	(France) Gillian Henrion	1:35.014	+6.943	24
24	LMP3	15	(United Kingdom) RLR M Sport	(France) Gaël Julien	1:35.249	+7.178	25
25	LMP3	4	(Luxembourg) DKR Engineering	(United States) Wyatt Brichacek	1:35.409	+7.338	26
26	LMP3	12	(Germany) WTM by Rinaldi Racing	(Colombia) Óscar Tunjo	1:35.567	+7.496	27
27	LMP3	88	(Poland) Inter Europol Competition	(United Kingdom) Kai Askey	1:36.016	+7.945	28
28	LMP3	31	(Switzerland) Racing Spirit of Léman	(France) Antoine Doquin	1:36.541	+8.470	29
29	LMP3	11	(Italy) Eurointernational	(Canada) Adam Ali	1:36.628	+8.557	30
30	LMP3	5	(United Kingdom) RLR M Sport	(United Kingdom) Bailey Voisin	1:36.679	+8.608	31
31	LMP2 Pro/Am	3	(Luxembourg) DKR Engineering	(Australia) Andres Latorre Canon	1:37.086	+9.015	22
32	LMP3	35	(France) Ultimate	(France) Matthieu Lahaye	1:37.331	+9.260	32
33	**LMGT3**	**85**	**(Germany) Iron Dames**	**(Belgium) Sarah Bovy**	**1:41.850**	**+13.779**	33
34	LMGT3	63	(Italy) Iron Lynx	(Japan) Hiroshi Hamaguchi	1:42.167	+14.096	34
35	LMGT3	50	(Denmark) Formula Racing	(Denmark) Johnny Laursen	1:42.337	+14.266	35
36	LMGT3	55	(Switzerland) Spirit of Race	(United Kingdom) Duncan Cameron	1:42.759	+14.688	36
37	LMGT3	57	(Switzerland) Kessel Racing	(Japan) Takeshi Kimura	1:42.895	+14.824	37
38	LMGT3	97	(United Kingdom) Grid Motorsport by TF	(Singapore) Martin Berry	1:43.028	+14.957	38
39	LMGT3	86	(United Kingdom) GR Racing	(United Kingdom) Michael Wainwright	1:43.117	+15.046	39
40	LMGT3	51	(Italy) AF Corse	(France) Charles-Henri Samani	1:43.345	+15.274	40
41	LMGT3	59	(Switzerland) Racing Spirit of Léman	(United States) Derek DeBoer	1:43.351	+15.280	41
42	LMGT3	60	(Germany) Proton Competition	(Italy) Claudio Schiavoni	1:44.148	+16.077	42
43	LMGT3	66	(United Kingdom) JMW Motorsport	(United Kingdom) John Hartshorne	1:46.230	+18.159	43

== Race ==
=== Race result ===
The minimum number of laps for classification (70% of overall winning car's distance) was 97 laps. Class winners are marked in bold.

Final Classification
Pos	Class	No	Team	Drivers	Car	Tyres	Laps	Time/Gap
1	**LMP2**	**37**	**(Switzerland) COOL Racing**	**(Spain) Lorenzo Fluxá (Denmark) Malthe Jakobsen (Japan) Ritomo Miyata**	**Oreca 07**	G	**139**	**4:01:06.862**
2	LMP2	25	(Portugal) Algarve Pro Racing	(Liechtenstein) Matthias Kaiser (United Kingdom) Olli Caldwell (United Kingdom) Alexander Lynn	Oreca 07	G	139	+16.161
3	LMP2	22	(United Kingdom) United Autosports	(Romania) Filip Ugran (Japan) Marino Sato (United Kingdom) Benjamin Hanley	Oreca 07	G	139	+16.905
4	LMP2	28	(France) IDEC Sport	(France) Paul Lafargue (France) Reshad de Gerus (Netherlands) Job van Uitert	Oreca 07	G	139	+1:14.182
5	LMP2	65	(France) Panis Racing	(United Kingdom) Manuel Maldonado (France) Charles Milesi (Monaco) Arthur Leclerc	Oreca 07	G	139	+1:20.643
6	**LMP2 Pro/Am**	**83**	**(Italy) AF Corse**	**(France) François Perrodo (France) Matthieu Vaxivière (Italy) Alessio Rovera**	**Oreca 07**	G	**138**	**+1 Lap**
7	LMP2 Pro/Am	29	(France) Richard Mille by TDS	(United States) Rodrigo Sales (France) Mathias Beche (Switzerland) Grégoire Saucy	Oreca 07	G	138	+1 Lap
8	LMP2	43	(Poland) Inter Europol Competition	(Mexico) Sebastián Álvarez (France) Vladislav Lomko (France) Tom Dillmann	Oreca 07	G	138	+1 Lap
9	LMP2	14	(United States) AO by TF	(United Kingdom) Jonny Edgar (Switzerland) Louis Delétraz (Poland) Robert Kubica	Oreca 07	G	138	+1 Lap
10	LMP2	34	(Poland) Inter Europol Competition	(United Kingdom) Oliver Gray (France) Clément Novalak (Italy) Luca Ghiotto	Oreca 07	G	138	+1 Lap
11	LMP2	23	(United Kingdom) United Autosports	(United States) Bijoy Garg (Switzerland) Fabio Scherer (United Kingdom) Paul di Resta	Oreca 07	G	138	+1 Lap
12	LMP2 Pro/Am	24	(United Kingdom) Nielsen Racing	(United States) John Falb (United Kingdom) Colin Noble (Spain) Albert Costa Balboa	Oreca 07	G	137	+2 Laps
13	LMP2	10	(United Kingdom) Vector Sport	(United Kingdom) Ryan Cullen (Monaco) Stéphane Richelmi (Brazil) Felipe Drugovich	Oreca 07	G	137	+2 Laps
14	LMP2 Pro/Am	20	(Portugal) Algarve Pro Racing	(Greece) Kriton Lendoudis (United Kingdom) Richard Bradley (United Kingdom) Alex Quinn	Oreca 07	G	137	+2 Laps
15	LMP2 Pro/Am	77	(Germany) Proton Competition	(Italy) Giorgio Roda (Netherlands) Bent Viscaal (Austria) René Binder	Oreca 07	G	137	+2 Laps
16	LMP2	30	(France) Duqueine Team	(Netherlands) Niels Koolen (France) Jean-Baptiste Simmenauer (Australia) James Allen	Oreca 07	G	136	+3 Laps
17	LMP2 Pro/Am	3	(Luxembourg) DKR Engineering	(Australia) Andres Latorre Canon (Turkey) Cem Bölükbaşı (Germany) Laurents Hörr	Oreca 07	G	136	+3 Laps (Note: The No. 3 DKR Engineering was penalised for causing a collision with the No. 19 Team Virage. The penalty was a drive through converted to 30 seconds time penalty.)
18	LMP2	47	(Switzerland) COOL Racing	(Mexico) Alejandro Garcia (France) Paul-Loup Chatin (Denmark) Frederik Vesti	Oreca 07	G	136	+3 Laps (Note: The No. 47 COOL Racing was penalised for not respecting driving time of Paul-Loup Chatin who did not meet his driving time by 37 seconds. The penalty was 37 seconds stop & go converted to 72 seconds time penalty.)
19	LMP2	27	(United Kingdom) Nielsen Racing	(Denmark) David Heinemeier Hansson (Chile) Nicolás Pino (United Kingdom) Will Stevens	Oreca 07	G	131	+8 Laps
20	**LMP3**	**8**	**(Poland) Team Virage**	**(Algeria) Julien Gerbi (Portugal) Bernardo Pinheiro (France) Gillian Henrion**	**Ligier JS P320**	MI	**131**	**+8 Laps**
21	LMP3	17	(Switzerland) COOL Racing	(Portugal) Miguel Cristóvão (Switzerland) Cédric Oltramare (Portugal) Manuel Espírito Santo	Ligier JS P320	MI	131	+8 Laps
22	LMP3	11	(Italy) Eurointernational	(United Kingdom) Matthew Richard Bell (Canada) Adam Ali	Ligier JS P320	MI	130	+9 Laps
23	LMP3	15	(United Kingdom) RLR M Sport	(Denmark) Michael Jensen (United Kingdom) Nick Adcock (France) Gaël Julien	Ligier JS P320	MI	130	+9 Laps
24	LMP3	4	(Luxembourg) DKR Engineering	(Germany) Alexander Mattschull (Spain) Belén García (United States) Wyatt Brichacek	Duqueine M30 - D08	MI	130	+9 Laps
25	LMP3	88	(Poland) Inter Europol Competition	(United Arab Emirates) Alexander Bukhantsov (United Kingdom) Kai Askey (Portugal) Pedro Perino	Ligier JS P320	MI	129	+10 Laps
26	LMP3	31	(Switzerland) Racing Spirit of Léman	(France) Jacques Wolff (France) Jean-Ludovic Foubert (France) Antoine Doquin	Ligier JS P320	MI	129	+10 Laps
27	LMP3	12	(Germany) WTM by Rinaldi Racing	(Germany) Torsten Kratz (Germany) Leonard Weiss (Colombia) Óscar Tunjo	Duqueine M30 - D08	MI	127	+12 Laps
28	**LMGT3**	**50**	**(Denmark) Formula Racing**	**(Denmark) Johnny Laursen (Denmark) Conrad Laursen (Denmark) Nicklas Nielsen**	**Ferrari 296 LMGT3**	G	**127**	**+12 Laps**
29	LMGT3	86	(United Kingdom) GR Racing	(United Kingdom) Michael Wainwright (Italy) Riccardo Pera (Italy) Davide Rigon	Ferrari 296 LMGT3	G	127	+12 Laps
30	LMGT3	63	(Italy) Iron Lynx	(Japan) Hiroshi Hamaguchi (Zimbabwe) Axcil Jefferies (Italy) Andrea Caldarelli	Lamborghini Huracan LMGT3 Evo2	G	127	+12 Laps
31	LMGT3	60	(Germany) Proton Competition	(Italy) Claudio Schiavoni (Italy) Matteo Cressoni (France) Julien Andlauer	Porsche 911 GT3 R LMGT3	G	127	+12 Laps
32	LMGT3	55	(Switzerland) Spirit of Race	(United Kingdom) Duncan Cameron (South Africa) David Perel (Republic of Ireland) Matt Griffin	Ferrari 296 LMGT3	G	127	+12 Laps
33	LMGT3	59	(Switzerland) Racing Spirit of Léman	(United States) Derek DeBoer (United Kingdom) Casper Stevenson (France) Valentin Hasse-Clot	Aston Martin Vantage AMR LMGT3	G	126	+13 Laps
34	LMGT3	97	(United Kingdom) Grid Motorsport by TF	(Singapore) Martin Berry (United Kingdom) Lorcan Hanafin (United Kingdom) Jonathan Adam	Aston Martin Vantage AMR LMGT3	G	126	+13 Laps
35	LMGT3	51	(Italy) AF Corse	(France) Charles-Henri Samani (France) Emmanuel Collard (Belgium) Ulysse de Pauw	Ferrari 296 LMGT3	G	126	+13 Laps
36	LMGT3	57	(Switzerland) Kessel Racing	(Japan) Takeshi Kimura (France) Esteban Masson (Brazil) Daniel Serra	Ferrari 296 LMGT3	G	126	+13 Laps
37	LMP3	35	(France) Ultimate	(France) Alexandre Yvon (France) Jean-Baptiste Lahaye (France) Matthieu Lahaye	Ligier JS P320	MI	123	+16 Laps
38	LMP2 Pro/Am	21	(United Kingdom) United Autosports	(Brazil) Daniel Schneider (United Kingdom) Andrew Meyrick (United Kingdom) Oliver Jarvis	Oreca 07	G	121	+18 Laps
Not classified
	LMP2 Pro/Am	19	(Poland) Team Virage	(United Kingdom) Anthony Wells (United Kingdom) Matthew Bell (Brazil) Nelson Piquet Jr.	Oreca 07	G	128	
	LMP2	9	(Germany) Iron Lynx – Proton	(Germany) Jonas Ried (France) Macéo Capietto (Italy) Matteo Cairoli	Oreca 07	G	121	
	LMGT3	85	(Germany) Iron Dames	(Belgium) Sarah Bovy (Switzerland) Rahel Frey (Denmark) Michelle Gatting	Porsche 911 GT3 R LMGT3	G	103	
	LMGT3	66	(United Kingdom) JMW Motorsport	(United Kingdom) John Hartshorne (United Kingdom) Ben Tuck (United Kingdom) Philip Keen	Ferrari 296 LMGT3	G	83	
	LMP3	5	(United Kingdom) RLR M Sport	(Canada) James Dayson (Canada) Daniel Ali (United Kingdom) Bailey Voisin	Ligier JS P320	MI	6	

=== Statistics ===
==== Fastest lap ====
Class	Driver	Team	Time	Lap
LMP2	(Romania) Filip Ugran	(United Kingdom) #22 United Autosports	1:30.589	3
LMP2 Pro/Am	(Italy) Alessio Rovera	(Italy) #83 AF Corse	1:30.174	45
LMP3	(United States) Wyatt Brichacek	(Luxembourg) #4 DKR Engineering	1:38.387	101
LMGT3	(France) Esteban Masson	(Switzerland) #57 Kessel Racing	1:41.766	59
