= 2024 4 Hours of Imola =

Endurance sportscar racing event

The layout of the Autodromo Enzo e Dino Ferrari

The 2024 4 Hours of Imola was an endurance sportscar racing event held between 5 and 7 July 2024, as the third round of the 2024 European Le Mans Series season.

== Entry list ==
The pre-event entry list was released on 26 June 2024 and consisted of 43 entries between 4 categories - 14 in LMP2, 8 in LMP2 Pro/Am, 10 in LMP3 and 11 in LMGT3.

Paul-Loup Chatin replaced Ritomo Miyata in the No. 37 COOL Racing. Miyata could not compete in this round due to his FIA F2 commitments. The other change in the No. 47 was Carl Bennett who had replaced Alex García. Ferdinand Habsburg drove in the No. 47 COOL Racing for the first time this season after missing previous rounds due to an injury. Paul Lafargue had to skip this round for family matters, Marcos Siebert replaced him in the No. 28 IDEC Sport. Paul Lanchere joined Lahaye brothers in the No. 35 Ultimate.

== Schedule ==
Date	Time (local: CEST)	Event
Friday, 5 July	10:40	Free Practice 1
Friday, 5 July	15:40	Bronze Drivers Collective Test
Saturday, 6 July	10:05	Free Practice 2
Saturday, 6 July	14:35	Qualifying - LMGT3
Saturday, 6 July	15:00	Qualifying - LMP3
Saturday, 6 July	15:25	Qualifying - LMP2 Pro-Am
Saturday, 6 July	15:50	Qualifying - LMP2
Sunday, 7 July	11:30	Race

== Free practice ==
- Only the fastest car in each class is shown.

Free Practice 1	Class	No.	Entrant	Time
Free Practice 1	LMP2	34	(Poland) Inter Europol Competition	1:31.236
Free Practice 1	LMP2 Pro/Am	20	(Portugal) Algarve Pro Racing	1:31.787
Free Practice 1	LMP3	88	(Poland) Inter Europol Competition	1:39.053
Free Practice 1	LMGT3	57	(Switzerland) Kessel Racing	1:42.386
Free Practice 2	Class	No.	Entrant	Time
Free Practice 2	LMP2	65	(France) Panis Racing	1:30.885
Free Practice 2	LMP2 Pro/Am	20	(Portugal) Algarve Pro Racing	1:32.243
Free Practice 2	LMP3	12	(Germany) WTM by Rinaldi Racing	1:39.541
Free Practice 2	LMGT3	57	(Switzerland) Kessel Racing	1:42.588

== Qualifying ==
Pole position winners in each class are marked in bold.

Pos	Class	No.	Team	Driver	Time	Gap	Grid
1	**LMP2**	**65**	**(France) Panis Racing**	**(France) Charles Milesi**	**1:30.829**	—	1
2	LMP2	25	(Portugal) Algarve Pro Racing	(United Kingdom) Alexander Lynn	1:30.961	+0.132	2
3	LMP2	10	(United Kingdom) Vector Sport	(Brazil) Felipe Drugovich	1:30.988	+0.159	3
4	LMP2	47	(Switzerland) COOL Racing	(Denmark) Frederik Vesti	1:31.051	+0.222	4
5	LMP2	37	(Switzerland) COOL Racing	(Denmark) Malthe Jakobsen	1:31.098	+0.269	5
6	LMP2	34	(Poland) Inter Europol Competition	(United Kingdom) Oliver Gray	1:31.184	+0.355	6
7	LMP2	14	(United States) AO by TF	(Poland) Robert Kubica	1:31.279	+0.450	7
8	LMP2	22	(United Kingdom) United Autosports	(United Kingdom) Benjamin Hanley	1:31.321	+0.492	8
9	LMP2	23	(United Kingdom) United Autosports	(United Kingdom) Paul di Resta	1:31.365	+0.536	9
10	LMP2	28	(France) IDEC Sport	(France) Reshad de Gerus	1:31.465	+0.636	10
11	LMP2	43	(Poland) Inter Europol Competition	(France) Tom Dillmann	1:31.545	+0.716	11
12	LMP2	27	(United Kingdom) Nielsen Racing	(United Kingdom) Will Stevens	1:31.657	+0.828	12
13	LMP2	9	(Germany) Iron Lynx – Proton	(Italy) Matteo Cairoli	1:31.718	+0.889	13
14	**LMP2 Pro/Am**	**77**	**(Germany) Proton Competition**	**(Italy) Giorgio Roda**	**1:33.093**	**+2.264**	14
15	LMP2 Pro/Am	29	(France) Richard Mille by TDS	(United States) Rodrigo Sales	1:33.625	+2.796	16 (Note: The No. 29 Richard Mille by TDS was penalised for impeding the car No. 3 and was moved back on the grid by 1 position.)
16	LMP2 Pro/Am	83	(Italy) AF Corse	(France) François Perrodo	1:34.120	+3.291	15
17	LMP2 Pro/Am	19	(Poland) Team Virage	(United Kingdom) Anthony Wells	1:34.362	+3.533	17
18	LMP2 Pro/Am	24	(United Kingdom) Nielsen Racing	(United States) John Falb	1:34.455	+3.626	18
19	LMP2 Pro/Am	21	(United Kingdom) United Autosports	(Brazil) Daniel Schneider	1:34.959	+4.130	19
20	LMP2 Pro/Am	20	(Portugal) Algarve Pro Racing	(Greece) Kriton Lendoudis	1:35.872	+5.043	20
21	LMP2 Pro/Am	3	(Luxembourg) DKR Engineering	(Australia) Andres Latorre Canon	1:37.652	+6.823	21
22	**LMP3**	**4**	**(Luxembourg) DKR Engineering**	**(United States) Wyatt Brichacek**	**1:37.776**	**+6.947**	22
23	LMP3	12	(Germany) WTM by Rinaldi Racing	(Colombia) Óscar Tunjo	1:38.019	+7.190	23
24	LMP3	15	(United Kingdom) RLR M Sport	(France) Gaël Julien	1:38.564	+7.735	24
25	LMP3	88	(Poland) Inter Europol Competition	(United Kingdom) Kai Askey	1:38.637	+7.808	25
26	LMP3	17	(Switzerland) COOL Racing	(Portugal) Manuel Espírito Santo	1:38.684	+7.855	26
27	LMP3	8	(Poland) Team Virage	(France) Gillian Henrion	1:38.927	+8.098	27
28	LMP3	31	(Switzerland) Racing Spirit of Léman	(France) Antoine Doquin	1:39.072	+8.243	28
29	LMP3	11	(Italy) Eurointernational	(Canada) Adam Ali	1:39.081	+8.252	29
30	LMP3	5	(United Kingdom) RLR M Sport	(United Kingdom) Bailey Voisin	1:39.701	+8.872	30
31	LMP3	35	(France) Ultimate	(France) Jean-Baptiste Lahaye	1:39.775	+8.946	31
32	**LMGT3**	**85**	**(Germany) Iron Dames**	**(Belgium) Sarah Bovy**	**1:43.349**	**+12.520**	32
33	LMGT3	59	(Switzerland) Racing Spirit of Léman	(United States) Derek DeBoer	1:43.476	+12.647	33
34	LMGT3	63	(Italy) Iron Lynx	(Japan) Hiroshi Hamaguchi	1:43.560	+12.731	34
35	LMGT3	57	(Switzerland) Kessel Racing	(Japan) Takeshi Kimura	1:43.821	+12.992	35
36	LMGT3	97	(United Kingdom) Grid Motorsport by TF	(Singapore) Martin Berry	1:44.230	+13.401	36
37	LMGT3	50	(Denmark) Formula Racing	(Denmark) Johnny Laursen	1:44.592	+13.763	37
38	LMGT3	51	(Italy) AF Corse	(France) Charles-Henri Samani	1:44.747	+13.918	38
39	LMGT3	86	(United Kingdom) GR Racing	(United Kingdom) Michael Wainwright	1:44.786	+13.957	39
40	LMGT3	55	(Switzerland) Spirit of Race	(United Kingdom) Duncan Cameron	1:45.523	+14.694	40
41	LMGT3	60	(Germany) Proton Competition	(Italy) Claudio Schiavoni	1:46.321	+15.492	41
42	LMGT3	66	(United Kingdom) JMW Motorsport	(United Kingdom) John Hartshorne	1:49.682	+18.853	42
43	LMP2	30	(France) Duqueine Team	(Australia) James Allen	— (Note: The No. 30 Duqueine Team was penalised for causing the red flag during Qualifying session and lost all its laps. It was also obliged to start the race with its fastest driver.)		43

== Race ==
=== Race result ===
The minimum number of laps for classification (70% of overall winning car's distance) was 93 laps. Class winners are marked in bold.

Final Classification
Pos	Class	No	Team	Drivers	Car	Tyres	Laps	Time/Gap
1	**LMP2**	**65**	**(France) Panis Racing**	**(United Kingdom) Manuel Maldonado (France) Charles Milesi (Monaco) Arthur Leclerc**	**Oreca 07**	G	**133**	**4:01:32.720 (Note: The No. 65 Panis Racing was originally penalised for accelerating too early at the end of a Full Course Yellow, and a drive-through converted into 35 seconds time penalty was given. The penalty would later be overturned, with the No. 65 reinstated as winner.)**
2	LMP2	14	(United States) AO by TF	(United Kingdom) Jonny Edgar (Switzerland) Louis Delétraz (Poland) Robert Kubica	Oreca 07	G	133	+11.357
3	LMP2	10	(United Kingdom) Vector Sport	(United Kingdom) Ryan Cullen (Monaco) Stéphane Richelmi (Brazil) Felipe Drugovich	Oreca 07	G	133	+11.621
4	LMP2	43	(Poland) Inter Europol Competition	(Mexico) Sebastián Álvarez (France) Vladislav Lomko (France) Tom Dillmann	Oreca 07	G	133	+12.561
5	LMP2	28	(France) IDEC Sport	(Argentina) Marcos Siebert (France) Reshad de Gerus (Netherlands) Job van Uitert	Oreca 07	G	133	+12.735
6	LMP2	23	(United Kingdom) United Autosports	(United States) Bijoy Garg (Switzerland) Fabio Scherer (United Kingdom) Paul di Resta	Oreca 07	G	133	+42.244
7	LMP2	34	(Poland) Inter Europol Competition	(United Kingdom) Oliver Gray (France) Clément Novalak (Italy) Luca Ghiotto	Oreca 07	G	133	+1:01.248
8	LMP2	25	(Portugal) Algarve Pro Racing	(Liechtenstein) Matthias Kaiser (United Kingdom) Olli Caldwell (United Kingdom) Alexander Lynn	Oreca 07	G	132	+1 Laps
9	**LMP2 Pro/Am**	**20**	**(Portugal) Algarve Pro Racing**	**(Greece) Kriton Lendoudis (United Kingdom) Richard Bradley (United Kingdom) Alex Quinn**	**Oreca 07**	G	**132**	**+1 Laps**
10	LMP2 Pro/Am	83	(Italy) AF Corse	(France) François Perrodo (France) Matthieu Vaxivière (Italy) Alessio Rovera	Oreca 07	G	132	+1 Laps
11	LMP2 Pro/Am	29	(France) Richard Mille by TDS	(United States) Rodrigo Sales (Switzerland) Mathias Beche (Switzerland) Grégoire Saucy	Oreca 07	G	132	+1 Laps
12	LMP2	30	(France) Duqueine Team	(Netherlands) Niels Koolen (France) Jean-Baptiste Simmenauer (Australia) James Allen	Oreca 07	G	132	+1 Laps
13	LMP2 Pro/Am	19	(Poland) Team Virage	(United Kingdom) Anthony Wells (United Kingdom) Matthew Bell (Brazil) Nelson Piquet Jr.	Oreca 07	G	131	+2 Laps
14	LMP2 Pro/Am	3	(Luxembourg) DKR Engineering	(Australia) Andres Latorre Canon (Turkey) Cem Bölükbaşı (Germany) Laurents Hörr	Oreca 07	G	131	+2 Laps
15	LMP2 Pro/Am	24	(United Kingdom) Nielsen Racing	(United States) John Falb (United Kingdom) Colin Noble (Spain) Albert Costa Balboa	Oreca 07	G	131	+2 Laps
16	LMP2 Pro/Am	21	(United Kingdom) United Autosports	(Brazil) Daniel Schneider (United Kingdom) Andrew Meyrick (United Kingdom) Oliver Jarvis	Oreca 07	G	130	+3 Laps
17	LMP2 Pro/Am	77	(Germany) Proton Competition	(Italy) Giorgio Roda (Austria) René Binder (Netherlands) Bent Viscaal	Oreca 07	G	130	+3 Laps
18	LMP2	47	(Switzerland) COOL Racing	(Thailand) Carl Bennett (Austria) Ferdinand Habsburg (Denmark) Frederik Vesti	Oreca 07	G	130	+3 Laps
19	LMP2	22	(United Kingdom) United Autosports	(Romania) Filip Ugran (Japan) Marino Sato (United Kingdom) Benjamin Hanley	Oreca 07	G	130	+3 Laps (Note: The No. 22 United Autosports was penalised for not fulfilling minimum driving time by Benjamin Hanley. Hanley drove 1 minute and 35.999 seconds under the minimum. The penalty was deduction of 1 lap from the covered distance and adding 43 seconds to crew's total race time.)
20	LMP2	27	(United Kingdom) Nielsen Racing	(Denmark) David Heinemeier Hansson (Chile) Nicolás Pino (United Kingdom) Will Stevens	Oreca 07	G	128	+5 Laps
21	**LMP3**	**11**	**(Italy) Eurointernational**	**(United Kingdom) Matthew Richard Bell (Canada) Adam Ali**	**Ligier JS P320**	M	**125**	**+8 Laps**
22	LMP3	8	(Poland) Team Virage	(Algeria) Julien Gerbi (Portugal) Bernardo Pinheiro (France) Gillian Henrion	Ligier JS P320	M	125	+8 Laps
23	LMP3	35	(France) Ultimate	(France) Paul Lanchere (France) Jean-Baptiste Lahaye (France) Matthieu Lahaye	Ligier JS P320	M	124	+9 Laps
24	LMP3	15	(United Kingdom) RLR M Sport	(Denmark) Michael Jensen (United Kingdom) Nick Adcock (France) Gaël Julien	Ligier JS P320	M	124	+9 Laps
25	LMP3	12	(Germany) WTM by Rinaldi Racing	(Germany) Torsten Kratz (Germany) Leonard Weiss (Colombia) Óscar Tunjo	Duqueine M30 - D08	M	124	+9 Laps
26	LMP3	4	(Luxembourg) DKR Engineering	(Germany) Alexander Mattschull (Spain) Belén García (United States) Wyatt Brichacek	Duqueine M30 - D08	M	124	+9 Laps
27	LMP3	5	(United Kingdom) RLR M Sport	(Canada) James Dayson (Canada) Daniel Ali (United Kingdom) Bailey Voisin	Ligier JS P320	M	123	+10 Laps
28	**LMGT3**	**85**	**(Germany) Iron Dames**	**(Belgium) Sarah Bovy (Switzerland) Rahel Frey (Denmark) Michelle Gatting**	**Porsche 911 GT3 R LMGT3**	G	**123**	**+10 Laps**
29	LMGT3	59	(Switzerland) Racing Spirit of Léman	(United States) Derek DeBoer (United Kingdom) Casper Stevenson (France) Valentin Hasse-Clot	Aston Martin Vantage AMR LMGT3	G	123	+10 Laps
30	LMP3	17	(Switzerland) COOL Racing	(Portugal) Miguel Cristóvão (Switzerland) Cédric Oltramare (Portugal) Manuel Espírito Santo	Ligier JS P320	M	123	+10 Laps
31	LMGT3	63	(Italy) Iron Lynx	(Japan) Hiroshi Hamaguchi (Zimbabwe) Axcil Jefferies (Italy) Andrea Caldarelli	Lamborghini Huracan LMGT3 Evo2	G	123	+10 Laps
32	LMGT3	57	(Switzerland) Kessel Racing	(Japan) Takeshi Kimura (France) Esteban Masson (Brazil) Daniel Serra	Ferrari 296 LMGT3	G	123	+10 Laps (Note: The No. 57 Kessel Racing was penalised for overtaking car No. 63 under double-waved yellow flags. The penalty was a drive-through converted into 35 seconds time penalty.)
33	LMGT3	97	(United Kingdom) Grid Motorsport by TF	(Singapore) Martin Berry (United Kingdom) Lorcan Hanafin (United Kingdom) Jonathan Adam (Note: Jonathan Adam did not fulfil minimum driving time to score points.)	Aston Martin Vantage AMR LMGT3	G	123	+10 Laps (Note: The No. 97 Grid Motorsport by TF was penalised for exceeding track limits. The penalty was a drive-through converted into 35 seconds time penalty.)
34	LMGT3	51	(Italy) AF Corse	(France) Charles-Henri Samani (France) Emmanuel Collard (Argentina) Nicolás Varrone	Ferrari 296 LMGT3	G	122	+11 Laps
35	LMGT3	86	(United Kingdom) GR Racing	(United Kingdom) Michael Wainwright (Italy) Riccardo Pera (Italy) Davide Rigon	Ferrari 296 LMGT3	G	122	+11 Laps
36	LMGT3	55	(Switzerland) Spirit of Race	(United Kingdom) Duncan Cameron (South Africa) David Perel (Republic of Ireland) Matt Griffin	Ferrari 296 LMGT3	G	122	+11 Laps
37	LMGT3	50	(Denmark) Formula Racing	(Denmark) Johnny Laursen (Denmark) Conrad Laursen (Denmark) Nicklas Nielsen	Ferrari 296 LMGT3	G	122	+11 Laps
38	LMGT3	66	(United Kingdom) JMW Motorsport	(United Kingdom) John Hartshorne (United Kingdom) Ben Tuck (United Kingdom) Philip Keen	Ferrari 296 LMGT3	G	120	+13 Laps
39	LMGT3	60	(Germany) Proton Competition	(Italy) Claudio Schiavoni (Italy) Matteo Cressoni (France) Julien Andlauer	Porsche 911 GT3 R LMGT3	G	120	+13 Laps (Note: The No. 60 Proton Competition was penalised not complying with rules of accessing pit lane under a Full Course Yellow. The penalty was 3 minutes Stop & Go converted into deduction of 2 laps from the covered distance and adding 9 seconds to crew's total race time.)
40	LMP3	88	(Poland) Inter Europol Competition	(United Arab Emirates) Alexander Bukhantsov (United Kingdom) Kai Askey (Portugal) Pedro Perino (Note: Pedro Perino did not fulfil minimum driving time to score points.)	Ligier JS P320	M	107	+26 Laps
Not classified
	LMP2	9	(Germany) Iron Lynx – Proton	(Germany) Jonas Ried (France) Macéo Capietto (Italy) Matteo Cairoli	Oreca 07	G	120	
	LMP3	31	(Switzerland) Racing Spirit of Léman	(France) Jacques Wolff (France) Jean-Ludovic Foubert (France) Antoine Doquin	Ligier JS P320	M	104	
	LMP2	37	(Switzerland) COOL Racing	(Spain) Lorenzo Fluxá (Denmark) Malthe Jakobsen (France) Paul-Loup Chatin	Oreca 07	G	72	

=== Statistics ===
==== Fastest lap ====
Class	Driver	Team	Time	Lap
LMP2	(Monaco) Arthur Leclerc	(France) #65 Panis Racing	1:31.757	67
LMP2 Pro/Am	(United Kingdom) Oliver Jarvis	(United Kingdom) #21 United Autosports	1:32.694	108
LMP3	(United States) Wyatt Brichacek	(Luxembourg) #4 DKR Engineering	1:39.635	106
LMGT3	(France) Julien Andlauer	(Germany) #60 Proton Competition	1:42.689	90
