= 2025 European Le Mans Series =

European racing season

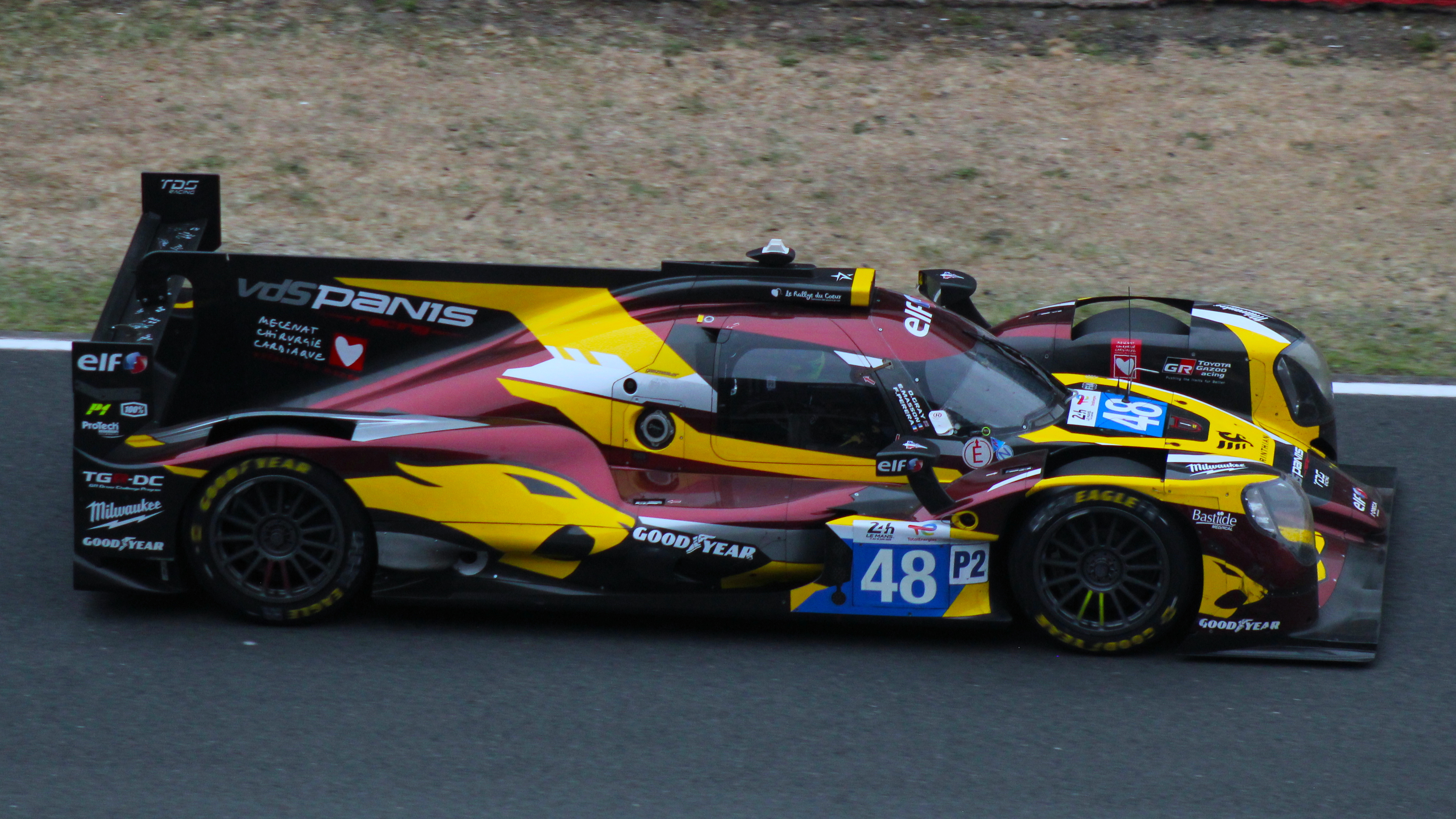
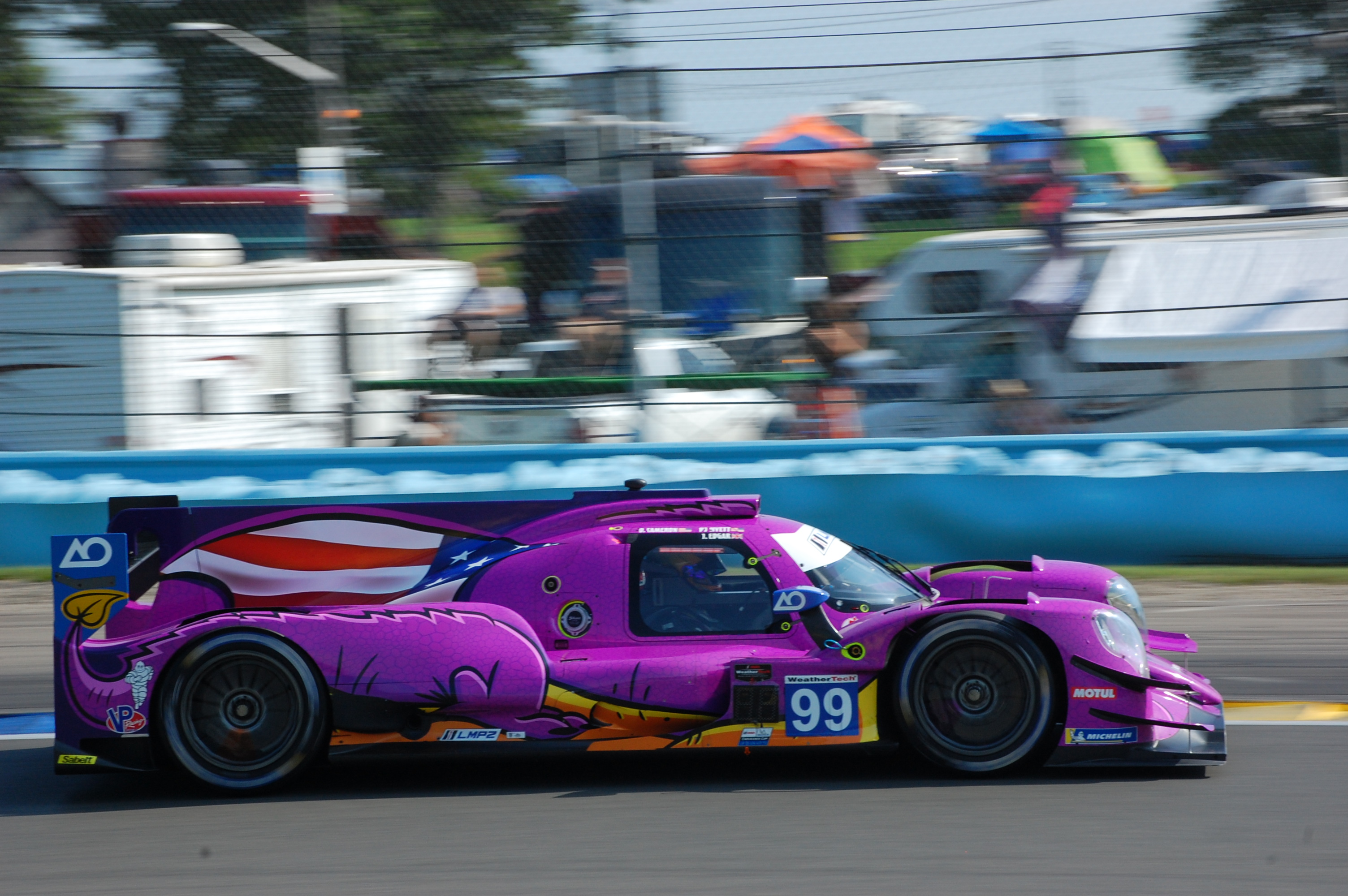
The No. 48 VDS Panis Racing won the LMP2 championship. The No. 99 AO by TF won the LMP2 Pro-Am championship.

The 2025 European Le Mans Series was the twenty-second season of the Automobile Club de l'Ouest's (ACO) European Le Mans Series. The six-event season began at Circuit de Barcelona-Catalunya on 6 April and finished at Algarve International Circuit on 18 October.

The series was open to Le Mans Prototypes, divided into the LMP2 and LMP3 classes, and grand tourer-style racing cars in the LMGT3 class. This season marked the debut of the new, third-generation LMP3 cars.

== Calendar ==
The provisional calendar for the 2025 season was announced on 2 October 2024. Silverstone Circuit returned to the calendar for the first time since the 2019 season, replacing the round at Mugello Circuit as the penultimate race of the season.

Locations of the 2025 races

Rnd	Race	Circuit	Location	Date
	Prologue	(Spain) Circuit de Barcelona-Catalunya	Montmeló, Spain	31 March/1 April
1	4 Hours of Barcelona	(Spain) Circuit de Barcelona-Catalunya	Montmeló, Spain	6 April
2	4 Hours of Le Castellet	(France) Circuit Paul Ricard	Le Castellet, France	4 May
3	4 Hours of Imola	(Italy) Imola Circuit	Imola, Italy	6 July
4	4 Hours of Spa-Francorchamps	(Belgium) Circuit de Spa-Francorchamps	Stavelot, Belgium	24 August
5	Goodyear 4 Hours of Silverstone	(United Kingdom) Silverstone Circuit	Silverstone, United Kingdom	14 September
6	4 Hours of Portimão	(Portugal) Algarve International Circuit	Portimão, Portugal	18 October

== Entries ==
=== LMP2 ===
All cars in the LMP2 class use the Gibson GK428 V8 engine and Goodyear tyres. Entries in the LMP2 Pro-Am class, set aside for teams with a Bronze-rated driver in their line-up, are denoted with icons.

Entrant/Team	Chassis	No.	MISC	Drivers	Rounds
(Luxembourg) DKR Engineering	Oreca 07	3	PA	(Germany) Laurents Hörr	All
(Luxembourg) DKR Engineering	Oreca 07	3	PA	(Greece) Georgios Kolovos	All
(Luxembourg) DKR Engineering	Oreca 07	3	PA	(France) Thomas Laurent	1–4
(Luxembourg) DKR Engineering	Oreca 07	3	PA	(Brazil) Felipe Fraga	5
(Luxembourg) DKR Engineering	Oreca 07	3	PA	(Switzerland) Neel Jani	6
(Germany) Iron Lynx – Proton	Oreca 07	9	P2	(Italy) Matteo Cairoli	All
(Germany) Iron Lynx – Proton	Oreca 07	9	P2	(France) Macéo Capietto	All
(Germany) Iron Lynx – Proton	Oreca 07	9	P2	(Germany) Jonas Ried	All
(Germany) Proton Competition	Oreca 07	77	PA	(Austria) René Binder	All
(Germany) Proton Competition	Oreca 07	77	PA	(Italy) Giorgio Roda	All
(Germany) Proton Competition	Oreca 07	77	PA	(Netherlands) Bent Viscaal	All
(United Kingdom) Vector Sport	Oreca 07	10	P2	(Republic of Ireland) Ryan Cullen	All
(United Kingdom) Vector Sport	Oreca 07	10	P2	(Brazil) Pietro Fittipaldi	All
(United Kingdom) Vector Sport	Oreca 07	10	P2	(France) Vladislav Lomko (Note: Lomko is Russian, but he competes under a French licence as Russian national emblems were banned by the FIA following the Russian invasion of Ukraine.)	All
(France) IDEC Sport	Oreca 07	18	P2	(United Kingdom) Jamie Chadwick	All
(France) IDEC Sport	Oreca 07	18	P2	(France) Mathys Jaubert	All
(France) IDEC Sport	Oreca 07	18	P2	(Spain) Daniel Juncadella	All
(France) IDEC Sport	Oreca 07	28	P2	(France) Paul-Loup Chatin	All
(France) IDEC Sport	Oreca 07	28	P2	(France) Paul Lafargue	All
(France) IDEC Sport	Oreca 07	28	P2	(Netherlands) Job van Uitert	All
(Portugal) Algarve Pro Racing	Oreca 07	20	PA	(United Kingdom) Olli Caldwell	All
(Portugal) Algarve Pro Racing	Oreca 07	20	PA	(Greece) Kriton Lendoudis	All
(Portugal) Algarve Pro Racing	Oreca 07	20	PA	(United Kingdom) Alex Quinn	All
(Portugal) Algarve Pro Racing	Oreca 07	25	P2	(Spain) Lorenzo Fluxá	All
(Portugal) Algarve Pro Racing	Oreca 07	25	P2	(Liechtenstein) Matthias Kaiser	All
(Portugal) Algarve Pro Racing	Oreca 07	25	P2	(France) Théo Pourchaire	All
(United Kingdom) United Autosports	Oreca 07	21	PA	(United Kingdom) Oliver Jarvis	All
(United Kingdom) United Autosports	Oreca 07	21	PA	(Japan) Marino Sato	All
(United Kingdom) United Autosports	Oreca 07	21	PA	(Brazil) Daniel Schneider	All
(United Kingdom) United Autosports	Oreca 07	22	P2	(United Kingdom) Ben Hanley	All
(United Kingdom) United Autosports	Oreca 07	22	P2	(Venezuela) Manuel Maldonado	All
(United Kingdom) United Autosports	Oreca 07	22	P2	(Switzerland) Grégoire Saucy	All
(United Kingdom) Nielsen Racing	Oreca 07	24	P2	(Portugal) Filipe Albuquerque	All
(United Kingdom) Nielsen Racing	Oreca 07	24	P2	(Turkey) Cem Bölükbaşı	All
(United Kingdom) Nielsen Racing	Oreca 07	24	P2	(Austria) Ferdinand Habsburg	All
(United Kingdom) Nielsen Racing	Oreca 07	27	PA	(Australia) James Allen	All
(United Kingdom) Nielsen Racing	Oreca 07	27	PA	(Brazil) Sérgio Sette Câmara	All
(United Kingdom) Nielsen Racing	Oreca 07	27	PA	(United Kingdom) Anthony Wells	1–3
(United Kingdom) Nielsen Racing	Oreca 07	27	PA	(United States) John Falb	4–6
(France) TDS Racing	Oreca 07	29	PA	(Switzerland) Mathias Beche	All
(France) TDS Racing	Oreca 07	29	PA	(France) Clément Novalak	All
(France) TDS Racing	Oreca 07	29	PA	(United States) Rodrigo Sales	All
(France) VDS Panis Racing	Oreca 07	48	P2	(United Kingdom) Oliver Gray	All
(France) VDS Panis Racing	Oreca 07	48	P2	(France) Esteban Masson	All
(France) VDS Panis Racing	Oreca 07	48	P2	(France) Charles Milesi	All
(France) Duqueine Team	Oreca 07	30	P2	(France) Reshad de Gerus	All
(France) Duqueine Team	Oreca 07	30	P2	(Israel) Roy Nissany	All
(France) Duqueine Team	Oreca 07	30	P2	(Italy) Francesco Simonazzi	1–3
(France) Duqueine Team	Oreca 07	30	P2	(Denmark) Benjamin Pedersen	4–6
(Poland) Inter Europol Competition	Oreca 07	34	P2	(Italy) Luca Ghiotto	All
(Poland) Inter Europol Competition	Oreca 07	34	P2	(Mozambique) Pedro Perino	All
(Poland) Inter Europol Competition	Oreca 07	34	P2	(France) Jean-Baptiste Simmenauer	All
(Poland) Inter Europol Competition	Oreca 07	43	P2	(France) Tom Dillmann	All
(Poland) Inter Europol Competition	Oreca 07	43	P2	(Poland) Jakub Śmiechowski	All
(Poland) Inter Europol Competition	Oreca 07	43	P2	(United Kingdom) Nick Yelloly	All
(Lithuania) CLX – Pure Rxcing	Oreca 07	37	P2	(United Kingdom) Tom Blomqvist	1–5
(Lithuania) CLX – Pure Rxcing	Oreca 07	37	P2	(United Kingdom) Alex Malykhin (Note: Malykhin is Belarusian, but he competes under a British licence as Belarusian national emblems were banned by the FIA following the Russian invasion of Ukraine.)	1–5
(Lithuania) CLX – Pure Rxcing	Oreca 07	37	P2	(France) Tristan Vautier	1–5
(Switzerland) CLX Motorsport	Oreca 07	47	P2	(Portugal) Manuel Espírito Santo	All (Note: Manuel Espírito Santo was entered for round 4 at Spa-Francorchamps, but withdrew after Wednesday's collective test on medical advice. He was replaced by Sebastián Álvarez.)
(Switzerland) CLX Motorsport	Oreca 07	47	P2	(Brazil) Enzo Fittipaldi	All
(Switzerland) CLX Motorsport	Oreca 07	47	P2	(Brazil) Pipo Derani	1–3
(Switzerland) CLX Motorsport	Oreca 07	47	P2	(Mexico) Sebastián Álvarez	4
(Italy) AF Corse	Oreca 07	83	PA	(France) François Perrodo	All
(Italy) AF Corse	Oreca 07	83	PA	(France) Matthieu Vaxivière	All
(Italy) AF Corse	Oreca 07	83	PA	(Italy) Alessio Rovera	1, 3–6
(Italy) AF Corse	Oreca 07	83	PA	(Denmark) Nicklas Nielsen	2
(United States) AO by TF	Oreca 07	99	PA	(United States) Dane Cameron	All
(United States) AO by TF	Oreca 07	99	PA	(Switzerland) Louis Delétraz	All
(United States) AO by TF	Oreca 07	99	PA	(United States) P. J. Hyett	All

Icon	MISC
P2	LMP2
PA	LMP2 Pro-Am

- Logan Sargeant was scheduled to compete for the Genesis Magma Racing-backed IDEC Sport effort, but withdrew prior to the start of the season. He was replaced by Daniel Juncadella. Months later, in an interview with Dailysportscar, Sargeant stated that he had never signed a contract with the team.
- Fabio Scherer was scheduled to compete for Nielsen Racing, but withdrew prior to the start of the season.
- Harry King was scheduled to compete for CLX – Pure Rxcing, but was replaced by Tristan Vautier.

=== LMP3 ===
All cars in the LMP3 class use the Toyota V35A-FTS 3.5 L twin-turbo V6 engine and Michelin tyres.

Entrant/Team	Chassis	No.	Drivers	Rounds
(Luxembourg) DKR Engineering	Ginetta G61-LT-P3 Evo	4	(United States) Wyatt Brichacek	All
(Luxembourg) DKR Engineering	Ginetta G61-LT-P3 Evo	4	(Denmark) Mikkel Gaarde Pedersen	All
(Luxembourg) DKR Engineering	Ginetta G61-LT-P3 Evo	4	(Estonia) Antti Rammo	All
(Poland) Team Virage	Ligier JS P325	8	(Netherlands) Rik Koen	All
(Poland) Team Virage	Ligier JS P325	8	(Spain) Daniel Nogales	All
(Poland) Team Virage	Ligier JS P325	8	(Poland) Jacek Zielonka	1–3
(Poland) Team Virage	Ligier JS P325	8	(Algeria) Julien Gerbi	4–6
(Italy) EuroInternational	Ligier JS P325	11	(Mexico) Ian Aguilera	All
(Italy) EuroInternational	Ligier JS P325	11	(France) Fabien Michal	All
(Italy) EuroInternational	Ligier JS P325	11	(Denmark) Sebastian Gravlund	1
(Italy) EuroInternational	Ligier JS P325	11	(Portugal) Miguel Cristóvão	6
(Germany) WTM by Rinaldi Racing	Duqueine D09	12	(Germany) Torsten Kratz	All
(Germany) WTM by Rinaldi Racing	Duqueine D09	12	(Australia) Griffin Peebles	All
(Germany) WTM by Rinaldi Racing	Duqueine D09	12	(Germany) Leonard Weiss	All
(United Kingdom) RLR MSport	Ligier JS P325	15	(United Kingdom) Nick Adcock	All
(United Kingdom) RLR MSport	Ligier JS P325	15	(France) Gillian Henrion	All
(United Kingdom) RLR MSport	Ligier JS P325	15	(Denmark) Michael Jensen	All
(Switzerland) CLX Motorsport	Ligier JS P325	17	(France) Adrien Closmenil	All
(Switzerland) CLX Motorsport	Ligier JS P325	17	(Denmark) Theodor Jensen	All
(Switzerland) CLX Motorsport	Ligier JS P325	17	(France) Paul Lanchère	All
(France) Racing Spirit of Léman	Ligier JS P325	31	(France) Marius Fossard	All
(France) Racing Spirit of Léman	Ligier JS P325	31	(France) Jean-Ludovic Foubert	All
(France) Racing Spirit of Léman	Ligier JS P325	31	(France) Jacques Wolff	All
(France) Ultimate	Ligier JS P325	35	(France) Jean-Baptiste Lahaye	All
(France) Ultimate	Ligier JS P325	35	(France) Matthieu Lahaye	All
(France) Ultimate	Ligier JS P325	35	(France) Louis Rossi	1
(France) Ultimate	Ligier JS P325	35	(France) Louis Stern	2–6
(France) M Racing	Ligier JS P325	68	(France) Quentin Antonel	All
(France) M Racing	Ligier JS P325	68	(France) Stéphane Tribaudini	All
(Poland) Inter Europol Competition	Ligier JS P325	88	(United Kingdom) Tim Creswick	All
(Poland) Inter Europol Competition	Ligier JS P325	88	(Belgium) Douwe Dedecker	All
(Poland) Inter Europol Competition	Ligier JS P325	88	(United States) Reece Gold	All

- Matthew Richard Bell was scheduled to compete for EuroInternational, but withdrew prior to the start of the season. He was replaced by Fabien Michal, originally named in a reserve entry for R-ace GP.
- Óscar Tunjo was scheduled to compete for WTM by Rinaldi, but withdrew prior the start of the season. He was replaced by Griffin Peebles, originally named in a reserve entry for R-ace GP.
- Yann Ehrlacher was scheduled to compete for his uncle Yvan Muller's M Racing team, but did not appear at any rounds.

=== LMGT3 ===
All cars in the LMGT3 class use Goodyear tyres.

Entrant/Team	Chassis	Engine	No.	Drivers	Rounds
(United Kingdom) United Autosports	McLaren 720S GT3 Evo	McLaren M840T 4.0 L Turbo V8	23	(United Kingdom) Michael Birch	All
(United Kingdom) United Autosports	McLaren 720S GT3 Evo	McLaren M840T 4.0 L Turbo V8	23	(United Kingdom) Wayne Boyd	All
(United Kingdom) United Autosports	McLaren 720S GT3 Evo	McLaren M840T 4.0 L Turbo V8	23	(Australia) Garnet Patterson	All
(Italy) Richard Mille AF Corse	Ferrari 296 GT3	Ferrari F163CE 3.0 L Turbo V6	50	(Italy) Riccardo Agostini	All
(Italy) Richard Mille AF Corse	Ferrari 296 GT3	Ferrari F163CE 3.0 L Turbo V6	50	(Brazil) Custodio Toledo	All
(Italy) Richard Mille AF Corse	Ferrari 296 GT3	Ferrari F163CE 3.0 L Turbo V6	50	(France) Lilou Wadoux	All
(Italy) AF Corse	Ferrari 296 GT3	Ferrari F163CE 3.0 L Turbo V6	51	(Denmark) Conrad Laursen	All
(Italy) AF Corse	Ferrari 296 GT3	Ferrari F163CE 3.0 L Turbo V6	51	(Italy) Davide Rigon	All
(Italy) AF Corse	Ferrari 296 GT3	Ferrari F163CE 3.0 L Turbo V6	51	(France) Charles-Henri Samani	All
(Switzerland) Spirit of Race	Ferrari 296 GT3	Ferrari F163CE 3.0 L Turbo V6	55	(United Kingdom) Duncan Cameron	All
(Switzerland) Spirit of Race	Ferrari 296 GT3	Ferrari F163CE 3.0 L Turbo V6	55	(Republic of Ireland) Matt Griffin	All
(Switzerland) Spirit of Race	Ferrari 296 GT3	Ferrari F163CE 3.0 L Turbo V6	55	(South Africa) David Perel	All
(Switzerland) Kessel Racing	Ferrari 296 GT3	Ferrari F163CE 3.0 L Turbo V6	57	(Japan) Takeshi Kimura	All
(Switzerland) Kessel Racing	Ferrari 296 GT3	Ferrari F163CE 3.0 L Turbo V6	57	(United Kingdom) Ben Tuck	All
(Switzerland) Kessel Racing	Ferrari 296 GT3	Ferrari F163CE 3.0 L Turbo V6	57	(Brazil) Daniel Serra	1, 3, 5–6
(Switzerland) Kessel Racing	Ferrari 296 GT3	Ferrari F163CE 3.0 L Turbo V6	57	(United Kingdom) James Calado	2, 4
(Switzerland) Kessel Racing	Ferrari 296 GT3	Ferrari F163CE 3.0 L Turbo V6	74	(United Kingdom) Andrew Gilbert	All
(Switzerland) Kessel Racing	Ferrari 296 GT3	Ferrari F163CE 3.0 L Turbo V6	74	(Spain) Miguel Molina	All
(Switzerland) Kessel Racing	Ferrari 296 GT3	Ferrari F163CE 3.0 L Turbo V6	74	(Spain) Fran Rueda	All
(France) Racing Spirit of Léman	Aston Martin Vantage AMR GT3 Evo	Aston Martin M177 4.0 L Turbo V8	59	(France) Erwan Bastard	All
(France) Racing Spirit of Léman	Aston Martin Vantage AMR GT3 Evo	Aston Martin M177 4.0 L Turbo V8	59	(France) Valentin Hasse-Clot	All
(France) Racing Spirit of Léman	Aston Martin Vantage AMR GT3 Evo	Aston Martin M177 4.0 L Turbo V8	59	(France) Clément Mateu	All
(Germany) Proton Competition	Porsche 911 GT3 R (992)	Porsche M97/80 4.2 L Flat-6	60	(Italy) Matteo Cressoni	All
(Germany) Proton Competition	Porsche 911 GT3 R (992)	Porsche M97/80 4.2 L Flat-6	60	(Belgium) Alessio Picariello	1–4
(Germany) Proton Competition	Porsche 911 GT3 R (992)	Porsche M97/80 4.2 L Flat-6	60	(Italy) Claudio Schiavoni	1–2 (Note: Claudio Schiavoni was entered for round 2 at Le Castellet, but withdrew after Thursday's collective test on medical advice. He was replaced by Christian Ried.)
(Germany) Proton Competition	Porsche 911 GT3 R (992)	Porsche M97/80 4.2 L Flat-6	60	(Germany) Christian Ried	2–3
(Germany) Proton Competition	Porsche 911 GT3 R (992)	Porsche M97/80 4.2 L Flat-6	60	(Hong Kong) Antares Au	4
(Germany) Proton Competition	Porsche 911 GT3 R (992)	Porsche M97/80 4.2 L Flat-6	60	(Austria) Horst Felbermayr Jr.	5–6
(Germany) Proton Competition	Porsche 911 GT3 R (992)	Porsche M97/80 4.2 L Flat-6	60	(Austria) Horst Felix Felbermayr	5–6
(Italy) Iron Dames	Porsche 911 GT3 R (992)	Porsche M97/80 4.2 L Flat-6	85	(Belgium) Sarah Bovy	All
(Italy) Iron Dames	Porsche 911 GT3 R (992)	Porsche M97/80 4.2 L Flat-6	85	(Denmark) Michelle Gatting	All
(Italy) Iron Dames	Porsche 911 GT3 R (992)	Porsche M97/80 4.2 L Flat-6	85	(France) Célia Martin	All
(Italy) Iron Lynx	Mercedes-AMG GT3 Evo	Mercedes-AMG M159 6.2 L V8	63	(Singapore) Martin Berry	All
(Italy) Iron Lynx	Mercedes-AMG GT3 Evo	Mercedes-AMG M159 6.2 L V8	63	(United Kingdom) Lorcan Hanafin	All
(Italy) Iron Lynx	Mercedes-AMG GT3 Evo	Mercedes-AMG M159 6.2 L V8	63	(Germany) Fabian Schiller	All
(United Kingdom) JMW Motorsport	Ferrari 296 GT3	Ferrari F163CE 3.0 L Turbo V6	66	(Italy) Gianmaria Bruni	All
(United Kingdom) JMW Motorsport	Ferrari 296 GT3	Ferrari F163CE 3.0 L Turbo V6	66	(United States) Jason Hart	All
(United Kingdom) JMW Motorsport	Ferrari 296 GT3	Ferrari F163CE 3.0 L Turbo V6	66	(United States) Scott Noble	All
(United Kingdom) TF Sport	Chevrolet Corvette Z06 GT3.R	Chevrolet LT6.R 5.5 L V8	82	(Angola) Rui Andrade	All
(United Kingdom) TF Sport	Chevrolet Corvette Z06 GT3.R	Chevrolet LT6.R 5.5 L V8	82	(Republic of Ireland) Charlie Eastwood	All
(United Kingdom) TF Sport	Chevrolet Corvette Z06 GT3.R	Chevrolet LT6.R 5.5 L V8	82	(Japan) Hiroshi Koizumi	All
(United Kingdom) GR Racing	Ferrari 296 GT3	Ferrari F163CE 3.0 L Turbo V6	86	(United Kingdom) Tom Fleming	All
(United Kingdom) GR Racing	Ferrari 296 GT3	Ferrari F163CE 3.0 L Turbo V6	86	(Italy) Riccardo Pera	All
(United Kingdom) GR Racing	Ferrari 296 GT3	Ferrari F163CE 3.0 L Turbo V6	86	(United Kingdom) Michael Wainwright	All

- Marvin Kirchhöfer was scheduled to compete for United Autosports, but withdrew prior to the start of the season.
- Gustavo Menezes was scheduled to compete for Iron Lynx, but withdrew prior to the start of the season. He was replaced by Fabian Schiller.
- Cédric Sbirrazzuoli was scheduled to compete for Richard Mille AF Corse at three rounds due to Lilou Wadoux's Super GT commitments. However, Wadoux eventually stepped down from her Super GT duties to focus on ELMS, and Sbirrazzuoli was not called upon.

== Results and standings ==
=== Race results ===
Bold indicates overall winner.

Rnd.	Circuit	Pole	LMP2 Winning Team	LMP2 Pro-Am Winning Team	LMP3 Winning Team	LMGT3 Winning Team	Results
Rnd.	Circuit	Pole	LMP2 Winning Drivers	LMP2 Pro-Am Winning Drivers	LMP3 Winning Drivers	LMGT3 Winning Drivers	Results
1	(Spain) Catalunya	(France) No. 30 Duqueine Team	(France) No. 18 IDEC Sport	**(Italy) No. 83 AF Corse**	(Switzerland) No. 17 CLX Motorsport	(Italy) No. 85 Iron Dames	Report
1	(Spain) Catalunya	**(France) Reshad de Gerus** (Israel) Roy Nissany (Italy) Francesco Simonazzi	(United Kingdom) Jamie Chadwick (France) Mathys Jaubert (Spain) Daniel Juncadella	**(France) François Perrodo** **(Italy) Alessio Rovera** **(France) Matthieu Vaxivière**	(France) Adrien Closmenil (Denmark) Theodor Jensen (France) Paul Lanchère	(Belgium) Sarah Bovy (Denmark) Michelle Gatting (France) Célia Martin	Report
2	(France) Le Castellet	(Poland) No. 43 Inter Europol Competition	**(France) No. 18 IDEC Sport**	(United Kingdom) No. 27 Nielsen Racing	(Switzerland) No. 17 CLX Motorsport	(Italy) No. 50 Richard Mille AF Corse	Report
2	(France) Le Castellet	(France) Tom Dillmann (Poland) Jakub Śmiechowski **(United Kingdom) Nick Yelloly**	**(United Kingdom) Jamie Chadwick** **(France) Mathys Jaubert** **(Spain) Daniel Juncadella**	(Australia) James Allen (Brazil) Sérgio Sette Câmara (United Kingdom) Anthony Wells	(France) Adrien Closmenil (Denmark) Theodor Jensen (France) Paul Lanchère	(Italy) Riccardo Agostini (Brazil) Custodio Toledo (France) Lilou Wadoux	Report
3	(Italy) Imola	(Portugal) No. 25 Algarve Pro Racing	**(France) No. 48 VDS Panis Racing**	(United States) No. 99 AO by TF	(Switzerland) No. 17 CLX Motorsport	(United Kingdom) No. 82 TF Sport	Report
3	(Italy) Imola	(Spain) Lorenzo Fluxá (Liechtenstein) Matthias Kaiser **(France) Théo Pourchaire**	**(United Kingdom) Oliver Gray** **(France) Esteban Masson** **(France) Charles Milesi**	(United States) Dane Cameron (Switzerland) Louis Delétraz (United States) P. J. Hyett	(France) Adrien Closmenil (Denmark) Theodor Jensen (France) Paul Lanchère	(Angola) Rui Andrade (Republic of Ireland) Charlie Eastwood (Japan) Hiroshi Koizumi	Report
4	(Belgium) Spa-Francorchamps	(United Kingdom) No. 24 Nielsen Racing	**(France) No. 48 VDS Panis Racing**	(Portugal) No. 20 Algarve Pro Racing	(Poland) No. 8 Team Virage	(France) No. 59 Racing Spirit of Léman	Report
4	(Belgium) Spa-Francorchamps	(Portugal) Filipe Albuquerque (Turkey) Cem Bölükbaşı **(Austria) Ferdinand Habsburg**	**(United Kingdom) Oliver Gray** **(France) Esteban Masson** **(France) Charles Milesi**	(United Kingdom) Olli Caldwell (Greece) Kriton Lendoudis (United Kingdom) Alex Quinn	(Netherlands) Rik Koen (Spain) Daniel Nogales (Algeria) Julien Gerbi	(France) Erwan Bastard (France) Valentin Hasse-Clot (France) Clément Mateu	Report
5	(United Kingdom) Silverstone	(France) No. 48 VDS Panis Racing	**(France) No. 18 IDEC Sport**	(Portugal) No. 20 Algarve Pro Racing	(Switzerland) No. 17 CLX Motorsport	(Italy) No. 50 Richard Mille AF Corse	Report
5	(United Kingdom) Silverstone	(United Kingdom) Oliver Gray (France) **Esteban Masson** (France) Charles Milesi	**(United Kingdom) Jamie Chadwick** **(France) Mathys Jaubert** **(Spain) Daniel Juncadella**	(United Kingdom) Olli Caldwell (Greece) Kriton Lendoudis (United Kingdom) Alex Quinn	(France) Adrien Closmenil (Denmark) Theodor Jensen (France) Paul Lanchère	(Italy) Riccardo Agostini (Brazil) Custodio Toledo (France) Lilou Wadoux	Report
6	(Portugal) Algarve	(Germany) No. 9 Iron Lynx – Proton	**(France) No. 48 VDS Panis Racing**	(France) No. 29 TDS Racing	(Switzerland) No. 17 CLX Motorsport	(United Kingdom) No. 82 TF Sport	Report
6	(Portugal) Algarve	**(Italy) Matteo Cairoli** (France) Macéo Capietto (Germany) Jonas Ried	**(United Kingdom) Oliver Gray** **(France) Esteban Masson** **(France) Charles Milesi**	(Switzerland) Mathias Beche (France) Clément Novalak (United States) Rodrigo Sales	(France) Adrien Closmenil (Denmark) Theodor Jensen (France) Paul Lanchère	(Angola) Rui Andrade (Republic of Ireland) Charlie Eastwood (Japan) Hiroshi Koizumi	Report

== Season report ==
=== Barcelona ===
The ELMS season began with the 4 Hours of Barcelona, where Reshad de Gerus took overall pole in the No. 30 Duqueine Team entry. Laurents Hörr took an early overall lead in the No. 3 DKR Engineering Pro-Am entry, overtaking the full LMP2 field, but later received a penalty for jumping the start. The No. 48 VDS Panis Racing entry briefly took the lead, before being overtaken by the No. 47 CLX Motorsport entry, who led the race until the final hour before losing out to the No. 18 IDEC Sport entry. The No. 47 later retired ten laps from the finish with a mechanical issue. A late safety car resulted in a two-lap sprint to the finish. Having taken fresh tyres, the fourth-placed LMP2 Pro-Am No. 83 AF Corse entry driven by Matthieu Vaxivière was able to take the lead and the overall win. The No. 18 and No. 48 rounded out the overall podium. In LMP3, the No. 17 CLX Motorsport entry won after running in the top three for most of the race. In LMGT3, the No. 85 Iron Dames all-female entry led all but three laps to take victory.

=== Le Castellet ===
Following a maiden LMP2 pole position for Nick Yelloly and Inter Europol's first pole in the ELMS, the 4 Hours of Le Castellet became dominated by changing weather conditions. Despite a lap 1 spin for Jamie Chadwick, the No. 18 IDEC crew came out on top in a race involving two safety car periods. The team finished less than two seconds ahead of Pro-Am winners Nielsen Racing (No. 27), who had gained an early advantage as starting driver Anthony Wells was one of few to begin the race on wet tyres. Two late overtakes handed Louis Delétraz, driver of the No. 99 AO by TF Pro-Am entry, third on the overall podium. Though Spirit of Race took a dominant lead early on in LMGT3, with Duncan Cameron having been the only wet tyre runner at the start, the win was taken by Lilou Wadoux's #50 Richard Mille AF Corse after fending off Fabian Schiller in the closing laps. LMP3 saw CLX Motorsport take back-to-back wins, with Adrien Closmenil making the deciding pass on Quentin Antonel (No. 68 M Racing) with 40 minutes left.

=== Imola ===
In a rain-plagued qualifying session at Imola, No. 25 Algarve Pro Racing's Théo Pourchaire claimed a dominant pole position on a drying track. The race itself was red-flagged after an hour following a four-car incident at Tamburello which eliminated the LMGT3 polesitters Iron Lynx, among others. Having led before the interruption, the No. 43 Inter Europol crew dropped behind the No. 48 VDS Panis car despite an off for Esteban Masson during a mid-race shower, and itself escaped penalty when Tom Dillmann collided with the No. 10 Vector Sport. Charles Milesi pulled away from Dillmann in the final stint and took Panis's first win of the year, finishing ahead of the No. 43 and No. 25, the latter benefiting from a stop under Full-Course Yellow and a drive-through penalty for the #9 Iron Lynx. The championship-leading No. 18 finished outside of the points after an accident for Daniel Juncadella. In LMP2 Pro-Am, Dane Cameron in the No. 99 AO by TF defended his lead from Olli Caldwell (#20 APR) during the third hour, before Delétraz beat the recovering No. 77 Proton Competition crew to the class win. Despite late contact with Mathias Beche's No. 29 TDS Racing car, Alex Quinn held on to third for Algarve Pro. Despite a drive-through penalty for spinning the No. 68 M Racing car at the start, CLX Motorsport continued its LMP3 dominance with another victory from pole position. Célia Martin's spin in the second hour handed the LMGT3 lead to TF Sport's No. 82, which held on to GM's first ELMS LMGT3 victory.

=== Spa-Francorchamps ===
Wet weather played a role at Spa-Francorchamps too, as Ferdinand Habsburg claimed his maiden ELMS pole for No. 24 Nielsen Racing on a greasy track surface. After Oliver Gray had taken the lead during the race's first stint, the race became the No. 48 Panis crew's to lose. Esteban Masson quickly gapped the field following a safety car in hour two, and Charles Milesi drove home to a commanding victory. The second-placed No. 18 IDEC car was penalised for entering the pit lane under FCY conditions, promoting the No. 43 Inter Europol and No. 24 Nielsen cars to second and third respectively. Fourth overall was the No. 20 Algarve Pro entry of Lendoudis, Caldwell, and Quinn, which benefited from a late FCY period to jump the No. 21 of United Autosports in the final pit stop phase. Third in class was the No. 99, with the No. 29 TDS Racing car having pitted from second after a collision on the penultimate lap. A chaotic race for the No. 17 CLX crew, including multiple penalties and an eventual off for Closmenil, resulted in the No. 8 Team Virage of Gerbi, Nogales, and Koen picking up the LMP3 win. After a pit stop battle in the closing laps, the No. 59 Racing Spirit of Léman of Valentin Hasse-Clot beat the No. 63 Iron Lynx of Schiller to the LMGT3 victory.

=== Silverstone ===
For the first time since 2019, the ELMS returned to Silverstone, where Esteban Masson scored pole position in his first LMP2 qualifying session. The race was red-flagged thrice, first following a crash for Martin Berry's Iron Lynx No. 63 caused by Alex Malykhin, then for collision between Giorgio Roda, François Perrodo, and Nick Adcock, before being ended early due to heavy rain. With early leader Oliver Gray receiving a penalty for jumping a red light on pit exit, the No. 18 IDEC car was able to switch to wet-weather tyres at the correct moment and drive home to its third victory of the season, with the No. 43 Inter Europol entry taking another second place and the No. 10 Vector car finishing third. The LMP2 Pro-Am battle was decided in the final laps, as an initially charging Alex Quinn was overtaken by Louis Delétraz; a driving standards penalty caused Quinn's No. 20 Algarve Pro car to win by just over a tenth of a second over the No. 99 AO by TF crew. In the LMP3 class, the No. 17 CLX lineup won dominantly, earning itself the championship with one race to spare. Drama headlined the LMGT3 lead battle, where GR Racing's Riccardo Pera had passed the No. 50's Lilou Wadoux just before the race was ended with a red flag; however the No. 50 was classed as the winner due to the count back rule, results being taken from the last completed lap before the red flag.

=== Portimão ===
Ahead of the Portimão season finale, all but the LMP3 titles were up for grabs. In qualifying, Matteo Cairoli took pole in the No. 9 Iron Lynx – Proton. The race was controlled by the No. 48 Panis VDS entry, which took the lead in the opening stint at the hands of Oliver Gray before driving to an unchallenged title at the hands of Esteban Masson and Charles Milesi. The podium mirrored the overall LMP2 table, as the No. 43 Inter Europol outfit finished second and the No. 18 IDEC Sport crew claimed third. Drama unfolded in the LMP2 Pro-Am category, with the No. 99 AO by TF team claiming the title by finishing second after a collision caused Algarve Pro to finish last in class; the race was won by the No. 29 TDS Racing team. CLX Motorsport again dominated LMP3 to win their fifth race of the season, meanwhile the No. 82 TF Sport Corvette won LMGT3 from pole position, allowing it to clinch the class title ahead of the No. 50 Richard Mille by AF Corse Ferrari.

At the end-of-season awards banquet, several drivers received personal accolades: Mathys Jaubert and P. J. Hyett were named Rookie of the Year and Gentleman of the Year respectively, while Tom Dillmann, Mathias Beche, and Conrad Laursen received the Goodyear Wingfoot Awards in their classes for having the best average stint times in their classes across the campaign.

== Drivers' Championships ==
Points are awarded according to the following structure:

Position	**1st**	**2nd**	**3rd**	**4th**	**5th**	**6th**	**7th**	**8th**	**9th**	**10th**	**Pole**
Points	25	18	15	12	10	8	6	4	2	1	1

=== LMP2 Drivers' Championship ===
Pos.	Driver	Team	BAR (Spain)	LEC (France)	IMO (Italy)	SPA (Belgium)	SIL (United Kingdom)	POR (Portugal)	Points
1	(United Kingdom) Oliver Gray	(France) VDS Panis Racing	2	6	1	1	**8**	1	106
1	(France) Esteban Masson	(France) VDS Panis Racing	2	6	1	1	**8**	1	106
1	(France) Charles Milesi	(France) VDS Panis Racing	2	6	1	1	**8**	1	106
2	(France) Tom Dillmann	(Poland) Inter Europol Competition	10	**2**	2	2	2	2	92
2	(Poland) Jakub Śmiechowski	(Poland) Inter Europol Competition	10	**2**	2	2	2	2	92
2	(United Kingdom) Nick Yelloly	(Poland) Inter Europol Competition	10	**2**	2	2	2	2	92
3	(United Kingdom) Jamie Chadwick	(France) IDEC Sport	1	1	11	11	1	3	90
3	(France) Mathys Jaubert	(France) IDEC Sport	1	1	11	11	1	3	90
3	(Spain) Daniel Juncadella	(France) IDEC Sport	1	1	11	11	1	3	90
4	(Republic of Ireland) Ryan Cullen	(United Kingdom) Vector Sport	3	4	12	7	3	7	54
4	(Brazil) Pietro Fittipaldi	(United Kingdom) Vector Sport	3	4	12	7	3	7	54
4	(France) Vladislav Lomko	(United Kingdom) Vector Sport	3	4	12	7	3	7	54
5	(Portugal) Filipe Albuquerque	(United Kingdom) Nielsen Racing	7	5	7	**3**	6	Ret	46
5	(Turkey) Cem Bölükbaşı	(United Kingdom) Nielsen Racing	7	5	7	**3**	6	Ret	46
5	(Austria) Ferdinand Habsburg	(United Kingdom) Nielsen Racing	7	5	7	**3**	6	Ret	46
6	(Brazil) Enzo Fittipaldi	(Switzerland) CLX Motorsport	Ret	3	5	6	12	6	41
7	(Spain) Lorenzo Fluxá	(Portugal) Algarve Pro Racing	5	8	**3**	12	5	Ret	40
7	(Liechtenstein) Matthias Kaiser	(Portugal) Algarve Pro Racing	5	8	**3**	12	5	Ret	40
7	(France) Théo Pourchaire	(Portugal) Algarve Pro Racing	5	8	**3**	12	5	Ret	40
8	(France) Paul-Loup Chatin	(France) IDEC Sport	8	11	Ret	4	4	4	40
8	(France) Paul Lafargue	(France) IDEC Sport	8	11	Ret	4	4	4	40
8	(Netherlands) Job van Uitert	(France) IDEC Sport	8	11	Ret	4	4	4	40
9	(Italy) Matteo Cairoli	(Germany) Iron Lynx – Proton	11	Ret	4	8	7	**5**	35
9	(France) Macéo Capietto	(Germany) Iron Lynx – Proton	11	Ret	4	8	7	**5**	35
9	(Germany) Jonas Ried	(Germany) Iron Lynx – Proton	11	Ret	4	8	7	**5**	35
10	(Portugal) Manuel Espírito Santo	(Switzerland) CLX Motorsport	Ret	3	5	WD	12	6	33
11	(Brazil) Pipo Derani	(Switzerland) CLX Motorsport	Ret	3	5				25
12	(Italy) Luca Ghiotto	(Poland) Inter Europol Competition	9	10	6	5	9	Ret	23
12	(Mozambique) Pedro Perino	(Poland) Inter Europol Competition	9	10	6	5	9	Ret	23
12	(France) Jean-Baptiste Simmenauer	(Poland) Inter Europol Competition	9	10	6	5	9	Ret	23
13	(United Kingdom) Tom Blomqvist	(Lithuania) CLX – Pure Rxcing	4	Ret	10	9	Ret		15
13	(United Kingdom) Alex Malykhin	(Lithuania) CLX – Pure Rxcing	4	Ret	10	9	Ret		15
13	(France) Tristan Vautier	(Lithuania) CLX – Pure Rxcing	4	Ret	10	9	Ret		15
14	(United Kingdom) Ben Hanley	(United Kingdom) United Autosports	6	9	8	Ret	10	Ret	15
14	(Venezuela) Manuel Maldonado	(United Kingdom) United Autosports	6	9	8	Ret	10	Ret	15
14	(Switzerland) Grégoire Saucy	(United Kingdom) United Autosports	6	9	8	Ret	10	Ret	15
15	(France) Reshad de Gerus	(France) Duqueine Team	**Ret**	7	9	10	11	Ret	10
15	(Israel) Roy Nissany	(France) Duqueine Team	**Ret**	7	9	10	11	Ret	10
16	(Italy) Francesco Simonazzi	(France) Duqueine Team	**Ret**	7	9				9
17	(Mexico) Sebastián Álvarez	(Switzerland) CLX Motorsport				6			8
18	(Denmark) Benjamin Pedersen	(France) Duqueine Team				10	11	Ret	1
Pos.	Driver	Team	BAR (Spain)	LEC (France)	IMO (Italy)	SPA (Belgium)	SIL (United Kingdom)	POR (Portugal)	Points

Key
Colour	Result
Gold	Race winner
Silver	2nd place
Bronze	3rd place
Green	Points finish
Blue	Non-points finish
Blue	Non-classified finish (NC)
Purple	Did not finish (Ret)
Black	Disqualified (DSQ)
Black	Excluded (EX)
White	Did not start (DNS)
White	Race cancelled (C)
White	Withdrew (WD)
Blank	Did not participate

**Bold** - Pole

Italics - Fastest lap

=== LMP2 Pro-Am Drivers' Championship ===
Pos.	Driver	Team	BAR (Spain)	LEC (France)	IMO (Italy)	SPA (Belgium)	SIL (United Kingdom)	POR (Portugal)	Points
1	(United States) Dane Cameron	(United States) AO by TF	8	**2**	1	3	**2**	2	100
1	(Switzerland) Louis Delétraz	(United States) AO by TF	8	**2**	1	3	**2**	2	100
1	(United States) P. J. Hyett	(United States) AO by TF	8	**2**	1	3	**2**	2	100
2	(United Kingdom) Olli Caldwell	(Portugal) Algarve Pro Racing	2	6	3	1	1	8	95
2	(Greece) Kriton Lendoudis	(Portugal) Algarve Pro Racing	2	6	3	1	1	8	95
2	(United Kingdom) Alex Quinn	(Portugal) Algarve Pro Racing	2	6	3	1	1	8	95
3	(Switzerland) Mathias Beche	(France) TDS Racing	3	3	4	5	4	1	89
3	(France) Clément Novalak	(France) TDS Racing	3	3	4	5	4	1	89
3	(United States) Rodrigo Sales	(France) TDS Racing	3	3	4	5	4	1	89
4	(France) François Perrodo	(Italy) AF Corse	1	8	5	4	3	6	74
4	(France) Matthieu Vaxivière	(Italy) AF Corse	1	8	5	4	3	6	74
5	(Italy) Alessio Rovera	(Italy) AF Corse	1		5	4	3	6	70
6	(Austria) René Binder	(Germany) Proton Competition	**4**	4	**2**	**6**	Ret	**4**	66
6	(Italy) Giorgio Roda	(Germany) Proton Competition	**4**	4	**2**	**6**	Ret	**4**	66
6	(Netherlands) Bent Viscaal	(Germany) Proton Competition	**4**	4	**2**	**6**	Ret	**4**	66
7	(United Kingdom) Oliver Jarvis	(United Kingdom) United Autosports	5	5	6	2	5	7	62
7	(Japan) Marino Sato	(United Kingdom) United Autosports	5	5	6	2	5	7	62
7	(Brazil) Daniel Schneider	(United Kingdom) United Autosports	5	5	6	2	5	7	62
8	(Australia) James Allen	(United Kingdom) Nielsen Racing	7	1	8	Ret	6	3	58
8	(Brazil) Sérgio Sette Câmara	(United Kingdom) Nielsen Racing	7	1	8	Ret	6	3	58
9	(Germany) Laurents Hörr	(Luxembourg) DKR Engineering	6	7	7	7	7	5	42
9	(Greece) Georgios Kolovos	(Luxembourg) DKR Engineering	6	7	7	7	7	5	42
10	(United Kingdom) Anthony Wells	(United Kingdom) Nielsen Racing	7	1	8				35
11	(France) Thomas Laurent	(Luxembourg) DKR Engineering	6	7	7	7			26
12	(United States) John Falb	(United Kingdom) Nielsen Racing				Ret	6	3	23
13	(Switzerland) Neel Jani	(Luxembourg) DKR Engineering						5	10
14	(Brazil) Felipe Fraga	(Luxembourg) DKR Engineering					7		6
15	(Denmark) Nicklas Nielsen	(Italy) AF Corse		8					4
Pos.	Driver	Team	BAR (Spain)	LEC (France)	IMO (Italy)	SPA (Belgium)	SIL (United Kingdom)	POR (Portugal)	Points

Key
Colour	Result
Gold	Race winner
Silver	2nd place
Bronze	3rd place
Green	Points finish
Blue	Non-points finish
Blue	Non-classified finish (NC)
Purple	Did not finish (Ret)
Black	Disqualified (DSQ)
Black	Excluded (EX)
White	Did not start (DNS)
White	Race cancelled (C)
White	Withdrew (WD)
Blank	Did not participate

**Bold** - Pole

Italics - Fastest lap

=== LMP3 Drivers' Championship ===
Pos.	Driver	Team	BAR (Spain)	LEC (France)	IMO (Italy)	SPA (Belgium)	SIL (United Kingdom)	POR (Portugal)	Points
1	(France) Adrien Closmenil	(Switzerland) CLX Motorsport	**1**	**1**	**1**	**Ret**	1	**1**	130
1	(Denmark) Theodor Jensen	(Switzerland) CLX Motorsport	**1**	**1**	**1**	**Ret**	1	**1**	130
1	(France) Paul Lanchère	(Switzerland) CLX Motorsport	**1**	**1**	**1**	**Ret**	1	**1**	130
2	(Netherlands) Rik Koen	(Poland) Team Virage	8	Ret	5	1	4	2	69
2	(Spain) Daniel Nogales	(Poland) Team Virage	8	Ret	5	1	4	2	69
3	(United Kingdom) Tim Creswick	(Poland) Inter Europol Competition	3	4	7	3	5	6	66
3	(Belgium) Douwe Dedecker	(Poland) Inter Europol Competition	3	4	7	3	5	6	66
3	(United States) Reece Gold	(Poland) Inter Europol Competition	3	4	7	3	5	6	66
4	(France) Quentin Antonel	(France) M Racing	4	2	Ret	5	2	8	62
4	(France) Stéphane Tribaudini	(France) M Racing	4	2	Ret	5	2	8	62
5	(Mexico) Ian Aguilera	(Italy) EuroInternational	Ret	3	3	4	7	4	60
5	(France) Fabien Michal	(Italy) EuroInternational	Ret	3	3	4	7	4	60
6	(Algeria) Julien Gerbi	(Poland) Team Virage				1	4	2	55
7	(France) Jean-Baptiste Lahaye	(France) Ultimate	5	6	6	6	3	7	55
7	(France) Matthieu Lahaye	(France) Ultimate	5	6	6	6	3	7	55
8	(United Kingdom) Nick Adcock	(United Kingdom) RLR MSport	2	Ret	Ret	2	9	5	48
8	(France) Gillian Henrion	(United Kingdom) RLR MSport	2	Ret	Ret	2	9	5	48
8	(Denmark) Michael Jensen	(United Kingdom) RLR MSport	2	Ret	Ret	2	9	5	48
9	(France) Louis Stern	(France) Ultimate		6	6	6	3	7	45
10	(United States) Wyatt Brichacek	(Luxembourg) DKR Engineering	Ret	5	8	8	6	3	41
10	(Denmark) Mikkel Gaarde Pedersen	(Luxembourg) DKR Engineering	Ret	5	8	8	6	3	41
10	(Estonia) Antti Rammo	(Luxembourg) DKR Engineering	Ret	5	8	8	6	3	41
11	(France) Marius Fossard	(France) Racing Spirit of Léman	7	7	2	9	8	10	37
11	(France) Jean-Ludovic Foubert	(France) Racing Spirit of Léman	7	7	2	9	8	10	37
11	(France) Jacques Wolff	(France) Racing Spirit of Léman	7	7	2	9	8	10	37
12	(Germany) Torsten Kratz	(Germany) WTM by Rinaldi Racing	6	Ret	4	7	**Ret**	9	29
12	(Australia) Griffin Peebles	(Germany) WTM by Rinaldi Racing	6	Ret	4	7	**Ret**	9	29
12	(Germany) Leonard Weiss	(Germany) WTM by Rinaldi Racing	6	Ret	4	7	**Ret**	9	29
13	(Poland) Jacek Zielonka	(Poland) Team Virage	8	Ret	5				14
14	(Portugal) Miguel Cristóvão	(Italy) EuroInternational						4	12
15	(France) Louis Rossi	(France) Ultimate	5						10
16	(Denmark) Sebastian Gravlund	(Italy) EuroInternational	Ret						0
Pos.	Driver	Team	BAR (Spain)	LEC (France)	IMO (Italy)	SPA (Belgium)	SIL (United Kingdom)	POR (Portugal)	Points

Key
Colour	Result
Gold	Race winner
Silver	2nd place
Bronze	3rd place
Green	Points finish
Blue	Non-points finish
Blue	Non-classified finish (NC)
Purple	Did not finish (Ret)
Black	Disqualified (DSQ)
Black	Excluded (EX)
White	Did not start (DNS)
White	Race cancelled (C)
White	Withdrew (WD)
Blank	Did not participate

**Bold** - Pole

Italics - Fastest lap

=== LMGT3 Drivers' Championship ===
Pos.	Driver	Team	BAR (Spain)	LEC (France)	IMO (Italy)	SPA (Belgium)	SIL (United Kingdom)	POR (Portugal)	Points
1	(Angola) Rui Andrade	(United Kingdom) TF Sport	6	Ret	1	8	3	**1**	78
1	(Republic of Ireland) Charlie Eastwood	(United Kingdom) TF Sport	6	Ret	1	8	3	**1**	78
1	(Japan) Hiroshi Koizumi	(United Kingdom) TF Sport	6	Ret	1	8	3	**1**	78
2	(Italy) Riccardo Agostini	(Italy) Richard Mille AF Corse	9	1	8	5	1	8	70
2	(Brazil) Custodio Toledo	(Italy) Richard Mille AF Corse	9	1	8	5	1	8	70
2	(France) Lilou Wadoux	(Italy) Richard Mille AF Corse	9	1	8	5	1	8	70
3	(France) Erwan Bastard	(France) Racing Spirit of Léman	7	**6**	7	1	6	5	64
3	(France) Valentin Hasse-Clot	(France) Racing Spirit of Léman	7	**6**	7	1	6	5	64
3	(France) Clément Mateu	(France) Racing Spirit of Léman	7	**6**	7	1	6	5	64
4	(Belgium) Sarah Bovy	(Italy) Iron Dames	1	7	9	4	**10**	3	62
4	(Denmark) Michelle Gatting	(Italy) Iron Dames	1	7	9	4	**10**	3	62
4	(France) Célia Martin	(Italy) Iron Dames	1	7	9	4	**10**	3	62
5	(Japan) Takeshi Kimura	(Switzerland) Kessel Racing	2	9	Ret	3	4	7	53
5	(United Kingdom) Ben Tuck	(Switzerland) Kessel Racing	2	9	Ret	3	4	7	53
6	(United Kingdom) Duncan Cameron	(Switzerland) Spirit of Race	4	4	3	10	8	6	52
6	(Republic of Ireland) Matt Griffin	(Switzerland) Spirit of Race	4	4	3	10	8	6	52
6	(South Africa) David Perel	(Switzerland) Spirit of Race	4	4	3	10	8	6	52
7	(Singapore) Martin Berry	(Italy) Iron Lynx	**Ret**	2	**Ret**	**2**	Ret	4	51
7	(United Kingdom) Lorcan Hanafin	(Italy) Iron Lynx	**Ret**	2	**Ret**	**2**	Ret	4	51
7	(Germany) Fabian Schiller	(Italy) Iron Lynx	**Ret**	2	**Ret**	**2**	Ret	4	51
8	(United Kingdom) Tom Fleming	(United Kingdom) GR Racing	8	3	Ret	7	2	10	44
8	(Italy) Riccardo Pera	(United Kingdom) GR Racing	8	3	Ret	7	2	10	44
8	(United Kingdom) Michael Wainwright	(United Kingdom) GR Racing	8	3	Ret	7	2	10	44
9	(Denmark) Conrad Laursen	(Italy) AF Corse	5	5	4	6	11	9	42
9	(Italy) Davide Rigon	(Italy) AF Corse	5	5	4	6	11	9	42
9	(France) Charles-Henri Samani	(Italy) AF Corse	5	5	4	6	11	9	42
10	(Italy) Matteo Cressoni	(Germany) Proton Competition	3	8	5	Ret	5	13	39
11	(Brazil) Daniel Serra	(Switzerland) Kessel Racing	2		Ret		4	7	36
12	(Belgium) Alessio Picariello	(Germany) Proton Competition	3	8	5	Ret			29
13	(United Kingdom) Andrew Gilbert	(Switzerland) Kessel Racing	10	Ret	2	9	7	12	27
13	(Spain) Miguel Molina	(Switzerland) Kessel Racing	10	Ret	2	9	7	12	27
13	(Spain) Fran Rueda	(Switzerland) Kessel Racing	10	Ret	2	9	7	12	27
14	(United Kingdom) Michael Birch	(United Kingdom) United Autosports	11	11	10	Ret	Ret	2	19
14	(United Kingdom) Wayne Boyd	(United Kingdom) United Autosports	11	11	10	Ret	Ret	2	19
14	(Australia) Garnet Patterson	(United Kingdom) United Autosports	11	11	10	Ret	Ret	2	19
15	(United Kingdom) James Calado	(Switzerland) Kessel Racing		9		3			17
16	(Italy) Claudio Schiavoni	(Germany) Proton Competition	3	WD					15
17	(Germany) Christian Ried	(Germany) Proton Competition		8	5				14
18	(Italy) Gianmaria Bruni	(United Kingdom) JMW Motorsport	12	10	6	11	9	11	11
18	(United States) Jason Hart	(United Kingdom) JMW Motorsport	12	10	6	11	9	11	11
18	(United States) Scott Noble	(United Kingdom) JMW Motorsport	12	10	6	11	9	11	11
19	(Austria) Horst Felbermayr Jr.	(Germany) Proton Competition					5	13	10
19	(Austria) Horst Felix Felbermayr	(Germany) Proton Competition					5	13	10
20	(Hong Kong) Antares Au	(Germany) Proton Competition				Ret			0
Pos.	Driver	Team	BAR (Spain)	LEC (France)	IMO (Italy)	SPA (Belgium)	SIL (United Kingdom)	POR (Portugal)	Points

Key
Colour	Result
Gold	Race winner
Silver	2nd place
Bronze	3rd place
Green	Points finish
Blue	Non-points finish
Blue	Non-classified finish (NC)
Purple	Did not finish (Ret)
Black	Disqualified (DSQ)
Black	Excluded (EX)
White	Did not start (DNS)
White	Race cancelled (C)
White	Withdrew (WD)
Blank	Did not participate

**Bold** - Pole

Italics - Fastest lap

== Teams' Championships ==
Points are awarded according to the following structure:

Position	**1st**	**2nd**	**3rd**	**4th**	**5th**	**6th**	**7th**	**8th**	**9th**	**10th**	**Pole**
Points	25	18	15	12	10	8	6	4	2	1	1

=== LMP2 Teams' Championship ===
Pos.	Team	Car	BAR (Spain)	LEC (France)	IMO (Italy)	SPA (Belgium)	SIL (United Kingdom)	POR (Portugal)	Points
1	(France) #48 VDS Panis Racing	Oreca 07	2	6	1	1	**8**	1	106
2	(Poland) #43 Inter Europol Competition	Oreca 07	10	**2**	2	2	2	2	92
3	(France) #18 IDEC Sport	Oreca 07	1	1	11	11	1	3	90
4	(United Kingdom) #10 Vector Sport	Oreca 07	3	4	12	7	3	7	54
5	(United Kingdom) #24 Nielsen Racing	Oreca 07	7	5	7	**3**	6	Ret	46
6	(Switzerland) #47 CLX Motorsport	Oreca 07	Ret	3	5	6	12	6	41
7	(Portugal) #25 Algarve Pro Racing	Oreca 07	5	8	**3**	12	5	Ret	40
8	(France) #28 IDEC Sport	Oreca 07	8	11	Ret	4	4	4	40
9	(Germany) #9 Iron Lynx – Proton	Oreca 07	11	Ret	4	8	7	**5**	35
10	(Poland) #34 Inter Europol Competition	Oreca 07	9	10	6	5	9	Ret	23
11	(Lithuania) #37 CLX – Pure Rxcing	Oreca 07	4	Ret	10	9	Ret		15
12	(United Kingdom) #22 United Autosports	Oreca 07	6	9	8	Ret	10	Ret	15
13	(France) #30 Duqueine Team	Oreca 07	**Ret**	7	9	10	11	Ret	10
Pos.	Team	Car	BAR (Spain)	LEC (France)	IMO (Italy)	SPA (Belgium)	SIL (United Kingdom)	POR (Portugal)	Points

Key
Colour	Result
Gold	Race winner
Silver	2nd place
Bronze	3rd place
Green	Points finish
Blue	Non-points finish
Blue	Non-classified finish (NC)
Purple	Did not finish (Ret)
Black	Disqualified (DSQ)
Black	Excluded (EX)
White	Did not start (DNS)
White	Race cancelled (C)
White	Withdrew (WD)
Blank	Did not participate

**Bold** - Pole

Italics - Fastest lap

=== LMP2 Pro-Am Teams' Championship ===
Pos.	Team	Car	BAR (Spain)	LEC (France)	IMO (Italy)	SPA (Belgium)	SIL (United Kingdom)	POR (Portugal)	Points
1	(United States) #99 AO by TF	Oreca 07	8	**2**	1	3	**2**	2	100
2	(Portugal) #20 Algarve Pro Racing	Oreca 07	2	6	3	1	1	8	95
3	(France) #29 TDS Racing	Oreca 07	3	3	4	5	4	1	89
4	(Italy) #83 AF Corse	Oreca 07	1	8	5	4	3	6	74
5	(Germany) #77 Proton Competition	Oreca 07	**4**	4	**2**	**6**	Ret	**4**	66
6	(United Kingdom) #21 United Autosports	Oreca 07	5	5	6	2	5	7	62
7	(United Kingdom) #27 Nielsen Racing	Oreca 07	7	1	8	Ret	6	3	58
8	(Luxembourg) #3 DKR Engineering	Oreca 07	6	7	7	7	7	5	42
Pos.	Team	Car	BAR (Spain)	LEC (France)	IMO (Italy)	SPA (Belgium)	SIL (United Kingdom)	POR (Portugal)	Points

Key
Colour	Result
Gold	Race winner
Silver	2nd place
Bronze	3rd place
Green	Points finish
Blue	Non-points finish
Blue	Non-classified finish (NC)
Purple	Did not finish (Ret)
Black	Disqualified (DSQ)
Black	Excluded (EX)
White	Did not start (DNS)
White	Race cancelled (C)
White	Withdrew (WD)
Blank	Did not participate

**Bold** - Pole

Italics - Fastest lap

=== LMP3 Teams' Championship ===
Pos.	Team	Car	BAR (Spain)	LEC (France)	IMO (Italy)	SPA (Belgium)	SIL (United Kingdom)	POR (Portugal)	Points
1	(Switzerland) #17 CLX Motorsport	Ligier JS P325	**1**	**1**	**1**	**Ret**	1	**1**	130
2	(Poland) #8 Team Virage	Ligier JS P325	8	Ret	5	1	4	2	69
3	(Poland) #88 Inter Europol Competition	Ligier JS P325	3	4	7	3	5	6	66
4	(France) #68 M Racing	Ligier JS P325	4	2	Ret	5	2	8	62
5	(Italy) #11 EuroInternational	Ligier JS P325	Ret	3	3	4	7	4	60
6	(France) #35 Ultimate	Ligier JS P325	5	6	6	6	3	7	55
7	(United Kingdom) #15 RLR MSport	Ligier JS P325	2	Ret	Ret	2	9	5	48
8	(Luxembourg) #4 DKR Engineering	Ginetta G61-LT-P3 Evo	Ret	5	8	8	6	3	41
9	(France) #31 Racing Spirit of Léman	Ligier JS P325	7	7	2	9	8	10	37
10	(Germany) #12 WTM by Rinaldi Racing	Duqueine D09	6	Ret	4	7	**Ret**	9	29
Pos.	Team	Car	BAR (Spain)	LEC (France)	IMO (Italy)	SPA (Belgium)	SIL (United Kingdom)	POR (Portugal)	Points

Key
Colour	Result
Gold	Race winner
Silver	2nd place
Bronze	3rd place
Green	Points finish
Blue	Non-points finish
Blue	Non-classified finish (NC)
Purple	Did not finish (Ret)
Black	Disqualified (DSQ)
Black	Excluded (EX)
White	Did not start (DNS)
White	Race cancelled (C)
White	Withdrew (WD)
Blank	Did not participate

**Bold** - Pole

Italics - Fastest lap

=== LMGT3 Teams' Championship ===
Pos.	Team	Car	BAR (Spain)	LEC (France)	IMO (Italy)	SPA (Belgium)	SIL (United Kingdom)	POR (Portugal)	Points
1	(United Kingdom) #82 TF Sport	Chevrolet Corvette Z06 GT3.R	6	Ret	1	8	3	**1**	78
2	(Italy) #50 Richard Mille AF Corse	Ferrari 296 GT3	9	1	8	5	1	8	70
3	(France) #59 Racing Spirit of Léman	Aston Martin Vantage AMR GT3 Evo	7	**6**	7	1	6	5	64
4	(Italy) #85 Iron Dames	Porsche 911 GT3 R (992)	1	7	9	4	**10**	3	62
5	(Switzerland) #57 Kessel Racing	Ferrari 296 GT3	2	9	Ret	3	4	7	53
6	(Switzerland) #55 Spirit of Race	Ferrari 296 GT3	4	4	3	10	8	6	52
7	(Italy) #63 Iron Lynx	Mercedes-AMG GT3 Evo	**Ret**	2	**Ret**	**2**	Ret	4	51
8	(United Kingdom) #86 GR Racing	Ferrari 296 GT3	8	3	Ret	7	2	10	44
9	(Italy) #51 AF Corse	Ferrari 296 GT3	5	5	4	6	11	9	42
10	(Germany) #60 Proton Competition	Porsche 911 GT3 R (992)	3	8	5	Ret	5	13	39
11	(Switzerland) #74 Kessel Racing	Ferrari 296 GT3	10	Ret	2	9	7	12	27
12	(United Kingdom) #23 United Autosports	McLaren 720S GT3 Evo	11	11	10	Ret	Ret	2	19
13	(United Kingdom) #66 JMW Motorsport	Ferrari 296 GT3	12	10	6	11	9	11	11
Pos.	Team	Car	BAR (Spain)	LEC (France)	IMO (Italy)	SPA (Belgium)	SIL (United Kingdom)	POR (Portugal)	Points

Key
Colour	Result
Gold	Race winner
Silver	2nd place
Bronze	3rd place
Green	Points finish
Blue	Non-points finish
Blue	Non-classified finish (NC)
Purple	Did not finish (Ret)
Black	Disqualified (DSQ)
Black	Excluded (EX)
White	Did not start (DNS)
White	Race cancelled (C)
White	Withdrew (WD)
Blank	Did not participate

**Bold** - Pole

Italics - Fastest lap
