= Horst Felix Felbermayr =

Austrian racing driver (born 2005)

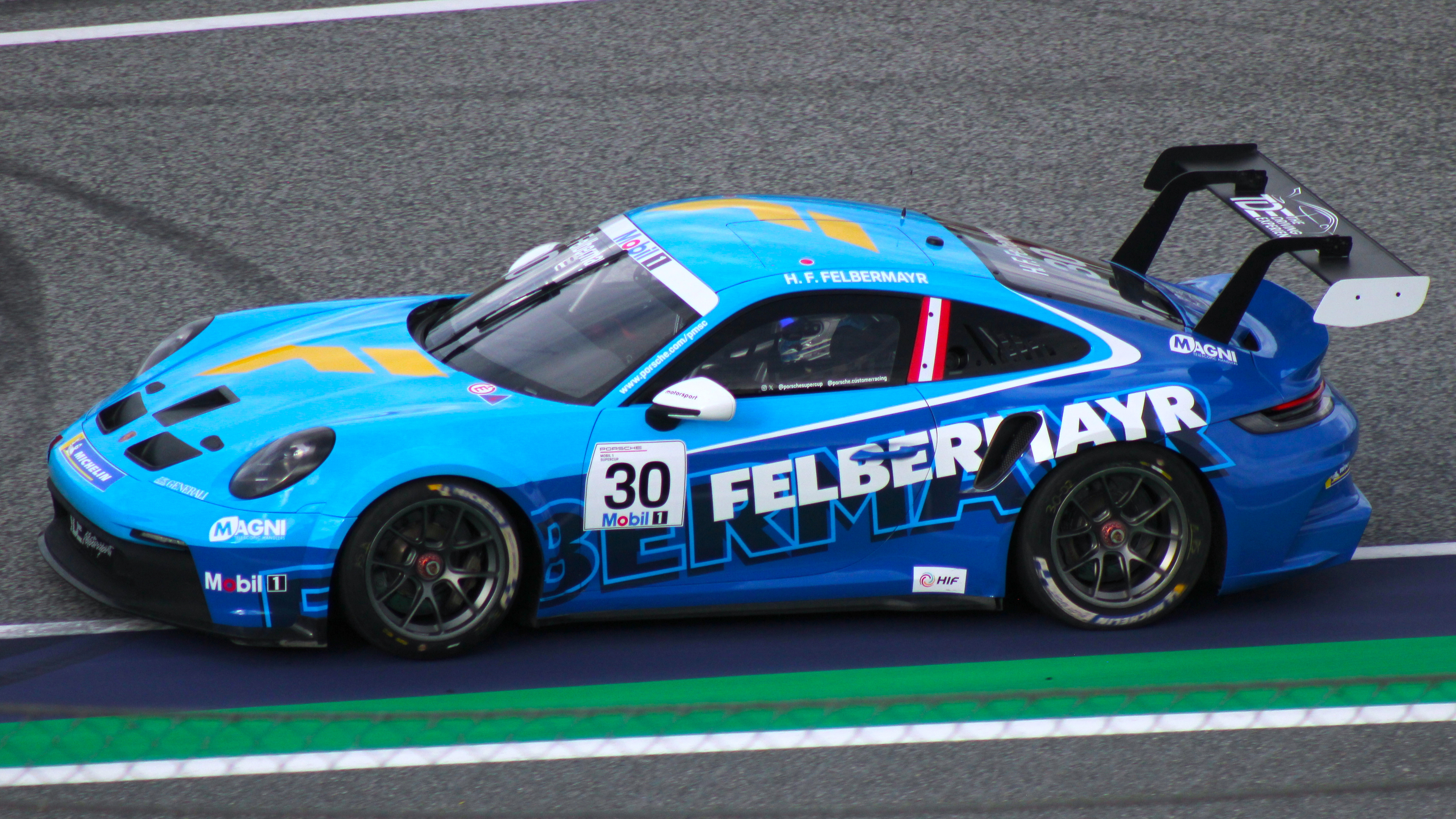
- Felbermayr in 2025
- Nationality: (Austria) Austrian
- Born: 6 May 2005 (age 21) Buchkirchen, Upper Austria, Austria
- Relatives: Horst Felbermayr (grandfather); Horst Felbermayr Jr. (father); Emma Felbermayr (sister)

European Le Mans Series career
- Debut season: 2025
- Current team: Proton Competition
- Categorisation: FIA Silver
- Car number: 88
- Starts: 8
- Wins: 0
- Podiums: 0
- Poles: 0
- Fastest laps: 0
- Best finish: 16th in 2026 (LMP2 Pro-Am)

Asian Le Mans Series career
- Debut season: 2025–26
- Current team: Proton Competition
- Car number: 66
- Starts: 6
- Wins: 0
- Podiums: 0
- Poles: 0
- Fastest laps: 0
- Best finish: 15th in 2025–26 (LMP2)

Previous series
- 2025 2023–2025 2023–2024 2023–2024 2023–2024 2023 2022 2022: Le Mans Cup; Porsche Supercup; Porsche Carrera Cup Germany; Porsche Carrera Cup Italia; Porsche Sprint Challenge Southern Europe; Porsche Carrera Cup Benelux; Ligier European Series; ADAC GT4 Germany

Horst Felix Felbermayr (born 6 May 2005) is an Austrian racing driver who is set to compete in the LMP2 class of the Asian Le Mans Series with Proton Competition. He most recently competed in the LMP2 Pro-Am class of the European Le Mans Series with Proton Competition.

== Career ==
=== Ligier European Series ===
In 2022, Felbermayr entered the 2022 Ligier European Series as his first foray into car racing. He entered into the JS2 category with RLR MSport, where he had a successful season, with one win and five podiums.

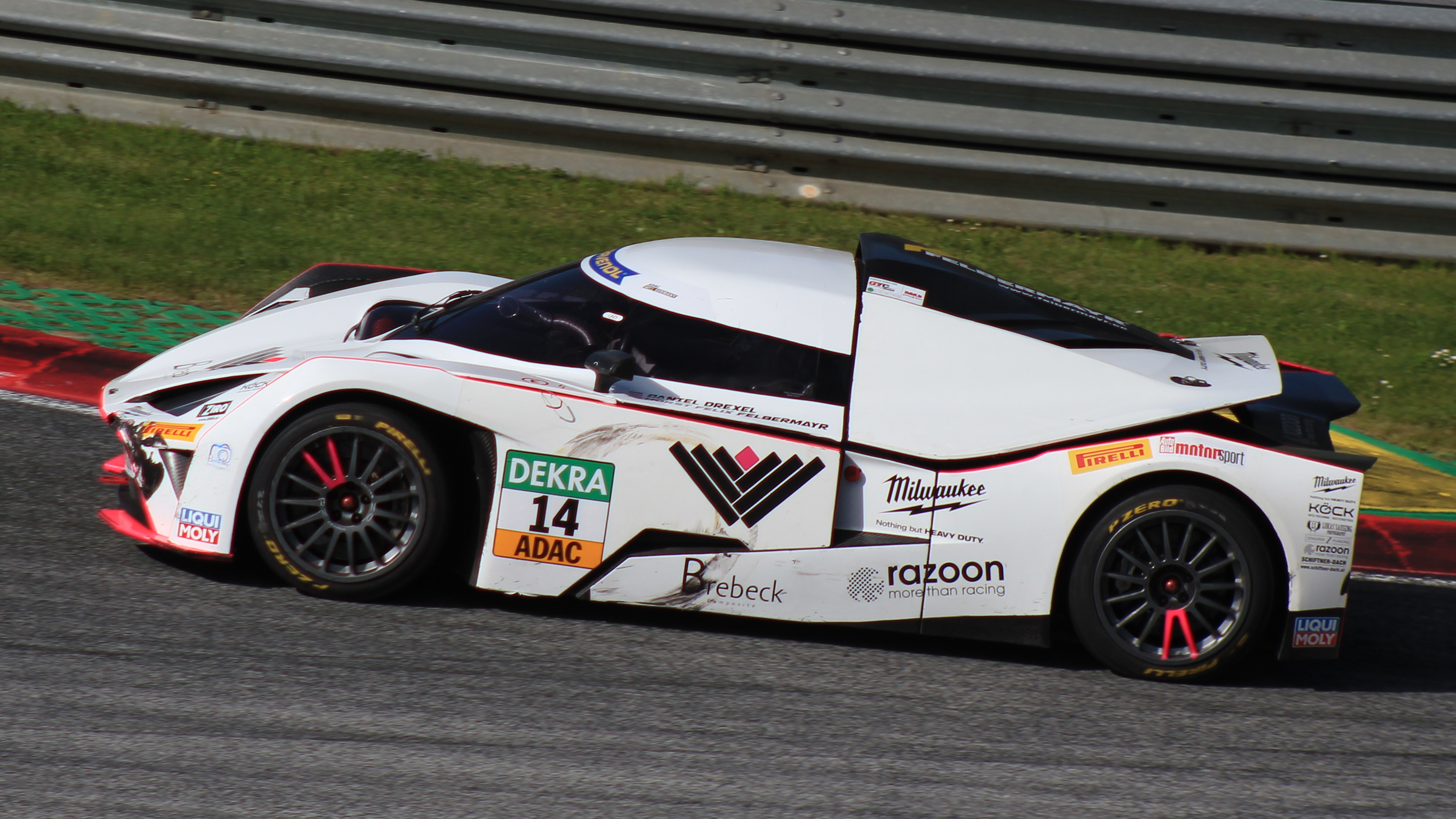
Felbermayr's KTM X-Bow at the 2022 ADAC GT4 Red Bull Ring round.

=== Porsche Carrera Cup Benelux ===
Felbermayr moved over to the Porsche Carrera Cup Benelux series in 2023 alongside a campaign in Porsche Carrera Cup Germany. During the final round at Circuit Zolder, Felbermayr finished in an impressive second in race one behind eventual series champion Robert de Haan.

=== Porsche Carrera Cup Germany ===
==== 2023 ====
Felbermayr dovetailed a campaign in the Porsche Carrera Cup Benelux series along with one in the 2023 Porsche Carrera Cup Germany series. He signed with Proton Competition to contest the full season. Felbermayr finished seventh in the Rookie standings with two class podiums, and 22nd in the overall standings.

==== 2024 ====
In 2024, Felbermayr returned to the series for another full season, driving for the Team Proton Huber Competition squad. He had a best finish of fifth in race two at Imola.

=== Le Mans Cup ===
Felbermayr made the switch to endurance racing in 2025, joining Reiter Engineering alongside his father Horst Felbermayr Jr. in the 2025 Le Mans Cup. He had a best finish of fifth in class during the first race at Barcelona.

=== Asian Le Mans Series ===
==== 2025–26 ====
Following the conclusion of his Le Mans Cup season, Felbermayr signed with Proton Competition to compete in the 2025–26 Asian Le Mans Series in the LMP2 class. He had four points scoring finishes and ended the season 15th in the championship.

==== 2026–27 ====
Felbermayr returned to the series the following season, once again competing in the LMP2 class with Proton Competition.

=== European Le Mans Series ===
==== 2025 ====
Felbermayr made a cameo in the 2025 European Le Mans Series, driving for Proton Competition in the LMGT3 class at the final two rounds of the season. He had a best finish of fifth at the 4 Hours of Silverstone.

==== 2026 ====
For 2026, Felbermayr joined the 2026 European Le Mans Series with Proton Competition to drive in the LMP2 Pro-Am class along with his father Horst Felbermayr Jr. He had a best result of ninth at the Barcelona and Spa. Felbermayr ended the season 16th in the LMP2 Pro-Am standings.

== Karting record ==
=== Karting career summary ===
Season	Series	Team	Position
2018	WSK Open Cup — OK-J	Ricciardo Kart	31st
2018	WSK Final Cup — OK-J	Ricciardo Kart	68th
2019	WSK Super Master Series — OK-J	Ricciardo Kart	66th
2019	Andrea Margutti Trophy — OK-J	Ricciardo Kart	19th
2019	WSK Euro Series — OK-J	Ricciardo Kart	96th
2019	WSK Open Cup — OK	Ricciardo Kart	41st
2019	German Kart Championship — OK-J	Ricciardo Kart	24th
2020	ADAC Kart Masters — OK	Ricciardo Kart	12th
2020	WSK Super Master Series — OK	Ricciardo Kart	83rd
2020	CIK-FIA European Championship — OK	Ricciardo Kart	41st
2021	ADAC Kart Masters — KZ2	Birel ART	14th
2021	CIK-FIA European Championship — KZ2	Birel ART	83rd
2021	WSK Open Cup — KZ2	Birel ART	41st
2022	WSK Euro Series — KZ2	KR Motorsport	49th
2022	WSK Final Cup — KZ2	KR Motorsport	50th

== Racing record ==
=== Racing career summary ===
Season	Series	Team	Races	Wins	Poles	F/Laps	Podiums	Points	Position
2022	ADAC GT4 Germany	Razoon - more than Racing	2	0	0	0	0	0	NC†
2022	Ligier European Series - JS2 R	RLR MSport	12	1	0	0	5	111	4th
2023	Porsche Sprint Challenge Southern Europe – Sport Pro-Am	Huber Racing	6	2	0	0	4	113	2nd
2023	Porsche Carrera Cup Germany	Proton Competition	15	0	0	0	0	10	22nd
2023	Porsche Supercup	Team Huber Racing	1	0	0	0	0	0	NC†
2023	Porsche Carrera Cup Benelux	Huber Racing	11	0	0	0	1	73	7th
2023	Porsche Carrera Cup Italia	The Driving Experiences	2	0	0	0	0	6	27th
2024	Porsche Sprint Challenge Southern Europe – Sport Pro	Proton Huber Competition	8	0	0	0	0	45	12th
2024	Porsche Carrera Cup Italia	The Driving Experiences	10	0	0	0	0	15	20th
2024	Porsche Carrera Cup Germany	Team Proton Huber Competition	16	0	0	0	0	20	19th
2024	Porsche Supercup	Proton Huber Competition	4	0	0	0	0	0	NC†
2025	Le Mans Cup – LMP3 Pro-Am	Reiter Engineering	6	0	0	0	0	28	13th
2025	Porsche Supercup	Proton Huber Competition	2	0	0	0	0	0	NC†
2025	Porsche Supercup	The Driving Experiences SRL	1	0	0	0	0	0	NC†
2025	European Le Mans Series – LMGT3	Proton Competition	2	0	0	0	0	10	19th
2025–26	Asian Le Mans Series – LMP2	Proton Competition	6	0	0	0	0	19	15th
2026	European Le Mans Series – LMP2 Pro-Am	Proton Competition	6	0	0	0	0	6	16th
2026	24 Hours of Le Mans – LMP2 Pro-Am	Proton Competition	1	0	0	0	0	–	6th
2026–27	Asian Le Mans Series – LMP2	Proton Competition	0	0	0	0	0	0	TBD

† As Felbermayr was a guest driver, he was ineligible to score championship points.

=== Complete Ligier European Series results ===
(key) (Races in bold indicate pole position) (Races in italics indicate fastest lap)

Year	Team	Class	Car	1	2	3	4	5	6	7	8	9	10	11	12	DC	Points	Ref
2022	RLR MSport	JS2	Ligier JS2 R	LEC; 1; 3	LEC; 2; 7	IMO; 1; 3	IMO; 2; 8	LMS; 1 Ret	LMS; 2; 22	MNZ; 1; 5	MNZ; 2 Ret	SPA; 1; 2	SPA; 2 Ret	POR; 1; 2	POR; 2; 1	4th	111	

=== Complete Porsche Carrera Cup Benelux results ===
(key) (Races in bold indicate pole position) (Races in italics indicate fastest lap)

Year	Team	1	2	3	4	5	6	7	8	9	10	11	12	DC	Points	Ref
2023	Huber Racing	SPA; 1; 12	SPA; 2; 11	HOC; 1; 11	HOC; 2; 9	ZAN; 1; 7	ZAN; 2; 10	ASS; 1; 15	ASS; 2 Ret	ZOL; 1	ZOL; 2	RBR; 1; 2	RBR; 2; 11	7th	73	

=== Complete Porsche Sprint Challenge Southern Europe results ===
(key) (Races in bold indicate pole position) (Races in italics indicate fastest lap)

Year	Team	Class	1	2	3	4	5	6	7	8	Pos.	Points	Ref
2023	Huber Racing	Sport Pro-Am	VAL; 1; 4	VAL; 2; 6	POR; 1; 2	POR; 2; 1	CAT; 1; 1	CAT; 2; 2			2nd	113	
2024	Proton Huber Competition	Sport Pro	POR; 1; 6	POR; 2; 11	EST; 1; 7	EST; 2; 6	VAL; 1; 7	VAL; 2 Ret	CAT; 1; 12	CAT; 2; 22	12th	45	

=== Complete Porsche Carrera Cup Germany results ===
(key) (Races in bold indicate pole position) (Races in italics indicate fastest lap)

Year	Team	1	2	3	4	5	6	7	8	9	10	11	12	13	14	15	16	Pos.	Points	Ref
2023	Proton Competition	SPA; 1; 20	SPA; 2 DNS	HOC1; 1; 18	HOC1; 2; 13	ZND; 1; 23	ZND; 2; 19	NÜR; 1; 15	NÜR; 2; 26	LAU; 1; 13	LAU; 2 Ret	SAC; 1; 19	SAC; 2 Ret	RBR; 1; 17	RBR; 2 Ret	HOC2; 1; 27	HOC2; 2; 13	22nd	10	
2024	Team Proton Huber Competition	IMO; 1; 14	IMO; 2; 5	OSC; 1 Ret	OSC; 2; 19	ZND; 1 Ret	ZND; 2; 16	HUN; 1; 20	HUN; 2; 17	NÜR; 1; 11	NÜR; 2 Ret	SAC; 1; 14	SAC; 2 Ret	RBR; 1; 17	RBR; 2; 21	HOC2; 1 Ret	HOC2; 2 Ret	19th	20	

=== Complete Porsche Carrera Cup Italia results ===
(key) (Races in bold indicate pole position) (Races in italics indicate fastest lap)

Year	Team	1	2	3	4	5	6	7	8	9	10	11	12	Pos.	Points	Ref
2023	The Driving Experiences	MIS1; 1	MIS1; 2	VAL; 1	VAL; 2	MUG; 1	MUG; 2	MNZ; 1	MNZ; 2	MIS2; 1	MIS2; 2	IMO; 1; 16	IMO; 2; 17	27th	6	
2024	The Driving Experiences	MIS; 1; 14	MIS; 2; 15	IMO1; 1; 12	IMO1; 2; 31	MUG; 1; 29	MUG; 2; 15	IMO2; 1	IMO2; 2	VAL; 1; 13	VAL; 2; 12	MNZ; 1 Ret	MNZ; 2 Ret	20th	15	

=== Complete Le Mans Cup results ===
(key) (Races in bold indicate pole position; results in italics indicate fastest lap)

Year	Entrant	Class	Chassis	1	2	3	4	5	6	7	Rank	Points	Ref
2025	Reiter Engineering	LMP3 Pro-Am	Ligier JS P325	BAR; 5	LEC; 8	LMS; 1; 6	LMS; 2; 11	SPA; Ret	SIL	POR; 6	13th	28	

=== Complete Asian Le Mans Series results ===
(key) (Races in bold indicate pole position; results in italics indicate fastest lap)

Year	Entrant	Class	Chassis	Engine	1	2	3	4	5	6	Rank	Points	Ref
2025–26	Proton Competition	LMP2	Oreca 07	Gibson GK428 4.2 L V8	SEP; 1; 9	SEP; 2; 5	DUB; 1; 10	DUB; 2; 13	ABU; 1; 7	ABU; 2; 13	15th	19	
2026–27	Proton Competition	LMP2	Oreca 07	Gibson GK428 4.2 L V8	LEC; 1	LEC; 2	JER; 1	JER; 2	POR; 1	POR; 2			

=== Complete European Le Mans Series results ===
(key) (Races in bold indicate pole position; results in italics indicate fastest lap)

Year	Entrant	Class	Chassis	Engine	1	2	3	4	5	6	Rank	Points	Ref
2025	Proton Competition	LMGT3	Porsche 911 GT3 R (992)	Porsche M97/80 4.2 L Flat-6	CAT	LEC	IMO	SPA	SIL; 5	ALG; 13	19th	10	
2026	Proton Competition	LMP2 Pro-Am	Oreca 07	Gibson GK428 4.2 L V8	CAT; 9	LEC; 12	IMO; 10	SPA; 9	SIL; 12	ALG; 10	16th	6	

=== 24 Hours of Le Mans results ===
Year	Team	Co-Drivers	Car	Class	Laps	Pos.	Class Pos.	Ref
2026	(Germany) Proton Competition	(Austria) Horst Felbermayr Jr. (Spain) Lorenzo Fluxá	Oreca 07-Gibson	LMP2 Pro-Am	354	28th	14th	
2026	(Germany) Proton Competition	(Austria) Horst Felbermayr Jr. (Spain) Lorenzo Fluxá	Oreca 07-Gibson	LMP2 Pro-Am	354	28th	6th	
