= Gillian Henrion =

French racing driver (born 2003)

- Henrion at Silverstone Circuit in 2026.
- Nationality: France
- Born: 23 March 2003 (age 23) Nancy, France

European Le Mans Series career
- Debut season: 2024
- Current team: RLR MSport
- Categorisation: FIA Silver
- Car number: 15
- Co-driver: Nick Adcock, Michael Jensen
- Starts: 11 (11 entries)
- Wins: 2
- Podiums: 5
- Poles: 0
- Fastest laps: 0
- Best finish: 3rd (LMP3) in 2024

Previous series
- 2023, 2025 2022 2020 2018-2019: Le Mans Cup; Ligier European Series; FR European Championship; French F4 Championship

Championship titles
- 2025 2023 2022: Le Mans Cup - LMP3 Pro-Am; Le Mans Cup - LMP3; Ligier European Series

Gillian Henrion (born 23 March 2003) is a French racing driver. He is the 2022 Ligier European Series champion in the JS P4 category, champion of the 2023 Le Mans Cup and winner of the Pro-Am class of the 2025 Le Mans Cup.

== Early career ==
=== Karting ===
Born in Nancy, Henrion started his karting career in 2014. His only title came in the French Karting Championship in the Cadet class in 2015 against future Formula Renault Eurocup champion Victor Martins. Henrion moved into international karting in 2016, racing in the European and World Championships with his father's team. The Frenchman remained in karts until 2017, where he finished second in the WSK Champions Cup to Ilya Morozov in the OKJ-class.

=== Lower formulae ===
In 2018, Henrion made his single-seater racing debut with an appearance in the final round of the French F4 Championship at Le Castellet. He finished all races in the top-ten, however due to him being a guest driver, Henrion didn't score any points.

The next year, Henrion continued racing in French F4. Despite only winning one race at the Hungaroring, Henrion stayed very consistent throughout the campaign, finishing in the points in all races he contested. With four third-placed finishes, Henrion finished fifth in the FFSA standings. Due to Victor Bernier's classification as a rookie, Henrion ended up fourth in the FIA Formula 4 standings, earning him five FIA Super Licence points.

=== Formula Regional European Championship ===
==== 2020 ====
In 2020, Henrion announced that he would drive for the family-run team Gillian Track Events GTE in the Formula Regional European Championship. He scored points at every event and got one podium in the rookie championship. The most notable moment of his season came at the second race in Mugello, where, due to a strategy gamble, Henrion found himself in the lead by almost half a minute, and finished the race in fourth place, which ended up being his best result of the year. Henrion finished tenth in the overall standings.

==== 2022 ====
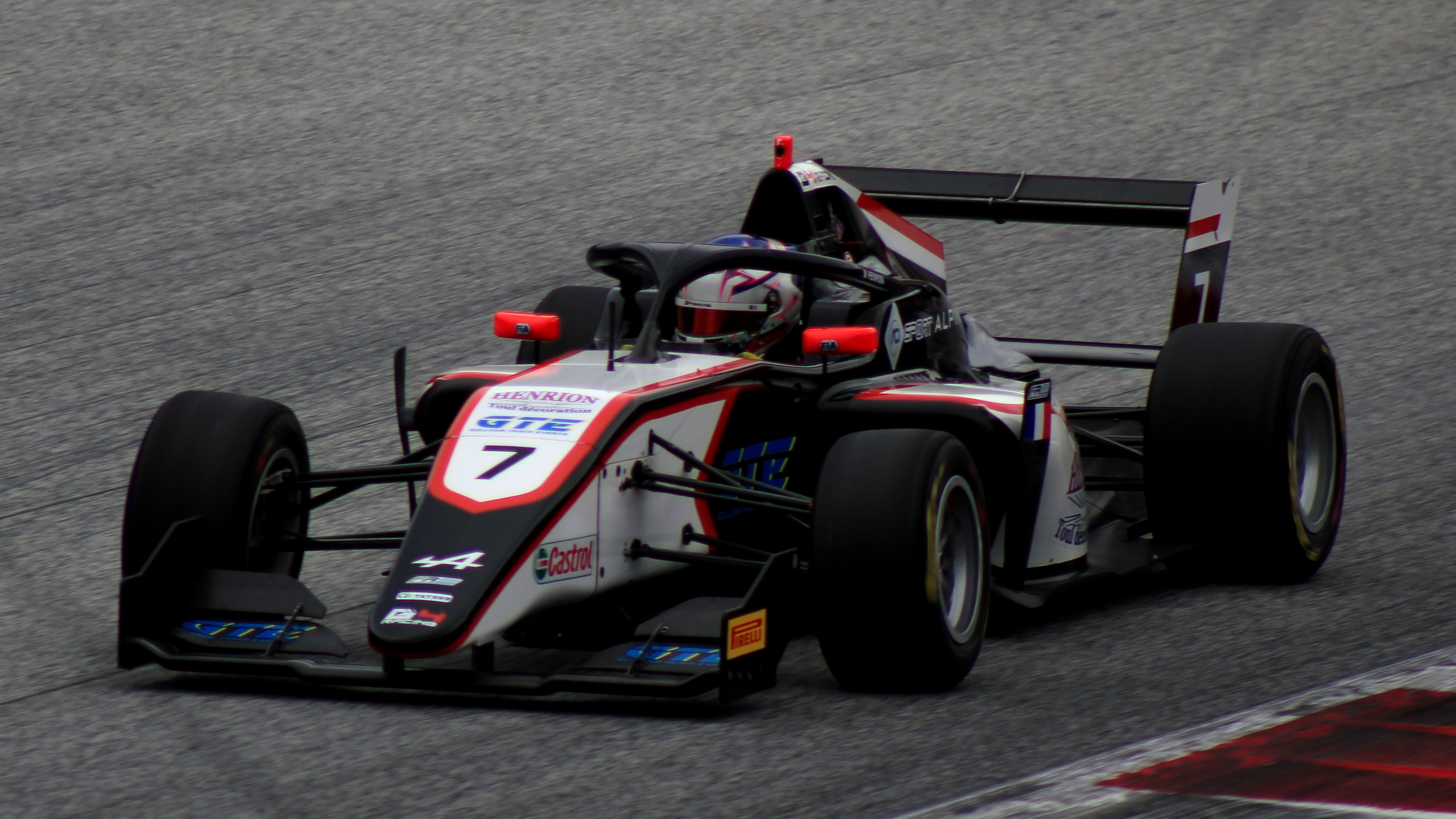
Henrion driving for G4 Racing at the Red Bull Ring in FRECA in 2022.

Henrion made a substitute appearance for G4 Racing in 2022, replacing the injured Axel Gnos at the Red Bull Ring.

== Sportscar career ==
=== 2022: First endurance success ===
After a year-long hiatus from racing, Henrion announced that he would be driving for Team Virage in the 2022 Ligier European Series. He would start out the campaign in brilliant fashion, as two pole positions were converted to two lights-to-flag victories at the season opener in Le Castellet. This became the start of a dominant season for Henrion, as he would take both wins in Imola, a pair of victories at Le Mans, which came as part of the support races for the 24 Hours of Le Mans, and another two wins at Monza. Henrion failed to win Race 1 at Spa-Francorchamps, finishing second, before crowning himself as the champion prematurely by winning Sunday's race. He ended the season in style, taking both victories in the final weekend at the Algarve International Circuit.

=== 2023: Le Mans Cup glory ===
In 2023, Henrion teamed up with Julien Gerbi, returning to Team Virage - this time in the Michelin Le Mans Cup. The season began positively, as Henrion and Gerbi managed to keep their cool during a chaotic opening race in Barcelona to take their first victory of the campaign. Having experienced a disappointing Road to Le Mans weekend, the pairing bounced back at Le Castellet, winning with a 4.9-second gap to the runners-up. Although the next round at MotorLand Aragón saw Henrion being overtaken by Matt Bell following the pit stop phase, the Frenchman managed to extend Team Virage's championship lead by ending up second and would keep the advantage going into the final round despite contact for Gerbi at the start of the race in Belgium. At the season finale held in the Algarve, the team took one further point as a result of Gerbi's maiden pole position in qualifying, and although the Algerian would be hit into the gravel by Torsten Kratz whilst in the lead of a rain-intensive race, with Henrion being unable to make up the lap lost thanks to the car's recovery from the sand trap, a second place for title rivals CD Sport meant that Henrion and Gerbi had taken the championship with a margin of four points.

=== 2024: ELMS debut ===
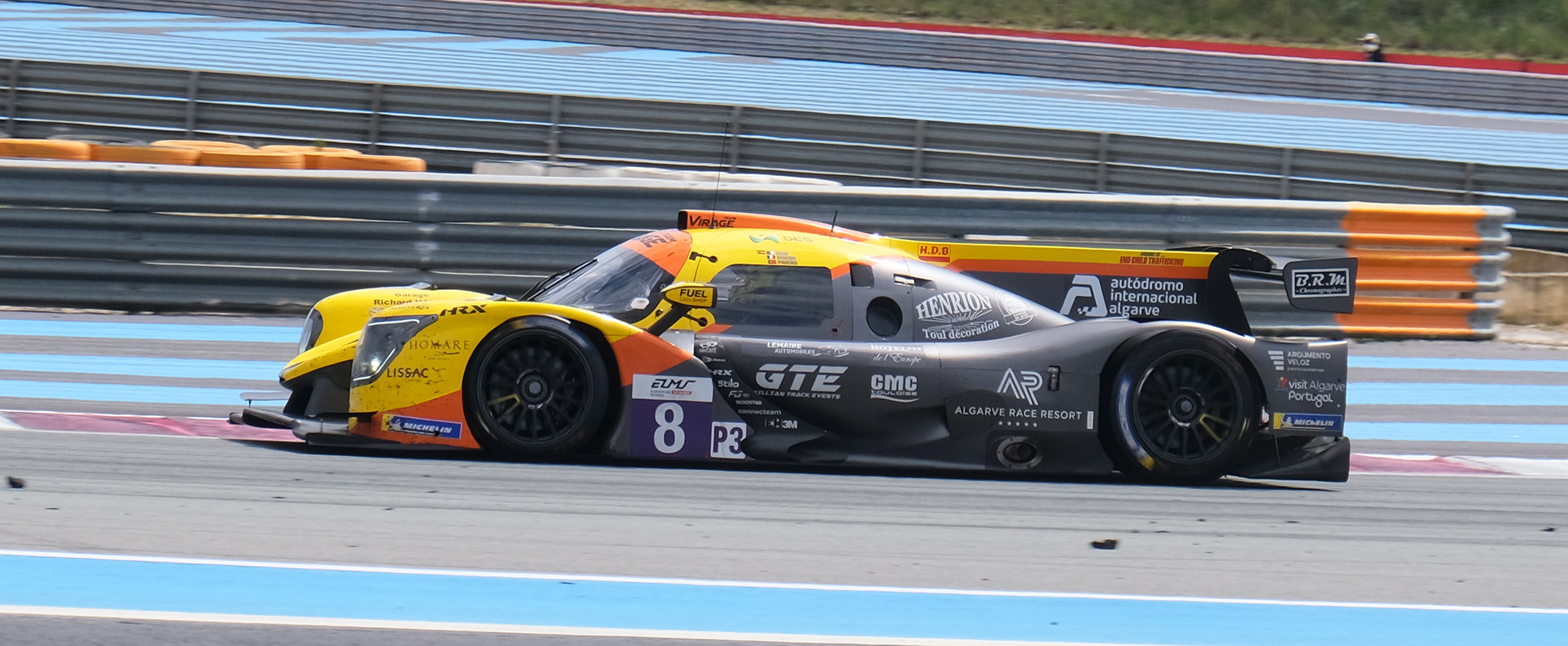
Henrion made his ELMS debut in LMP3 for Team Virage in 2024.

Remaining with Virage for the third year running, Henrion was able to step up to the European Le Mans Series, once again partnering Gerbi and being joined by Bernardo Pinheiro. At the season opener in Barcelona, Henrion and his teammates performed flawlessly to take victory. After finishing seventh in Le Castellet, Henrion made a late pass on Matthieu Lahaye at Imola to secure second. A closely-fought Spa race then yielded sixth place for the Virage squad. Mugello turned out to be Henrion's standout performance of the campaign, as he narrowly beat Gaël Julien to victory by stretching his car's fuel for almost 80 minutes, thus saving himself to make a final pit stop. Though this moved Team Virage into the championship lead going into Portimão, Henrion and his teammates only finished sixth, a result which dropped them to third in the standings. In spite of that, Henrion was named the series's Rookie of the Year. He also drove the Porsche 911 GT3 R (992) of Manthey Pure Rxcing in the FIA World Endurance Championship rookie test in November, having been selected by the series's organisers.

=== 2025: Second Le Mans Cup title ===
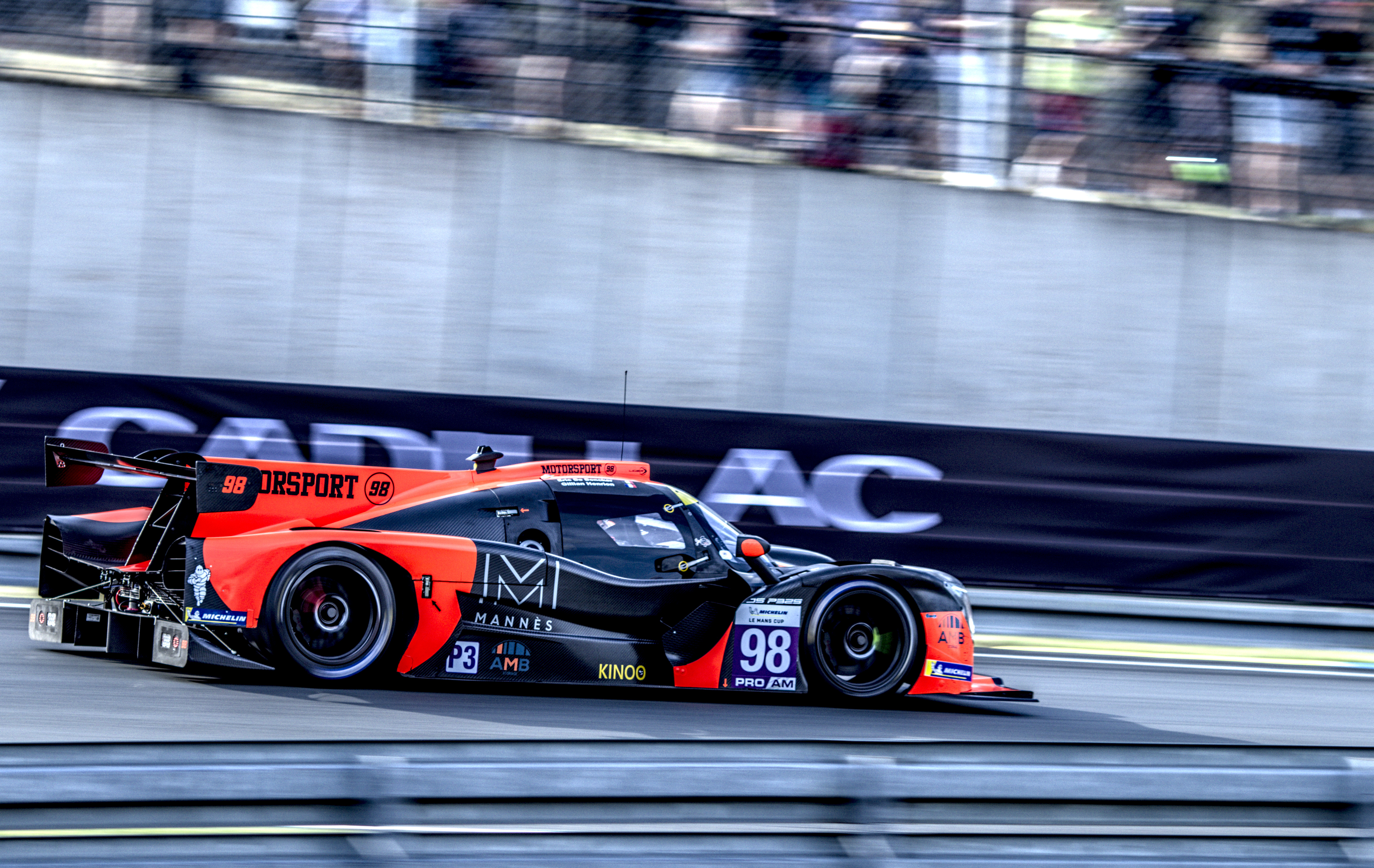
Henrion was crowned Le Mans Cup LMP3 Pro-Am champion for Motorsport98 in 2025.

Henrion contested a double campaign in 2025, driving alongside gentleman driver Eric De Doncker at Motorsport98 in the Pro-Am class of the Le Mans Cup, as well as partnering bronze-ranked Nick Adcock and Michael Jensen at RLR MSport in the ELMS. Though the latter started with a promising runner-up finish at Barcelona, retirements from the next two races — one after Henrion collided with an LMGT3 car in Le Castellet, the other caused by a mechanical issue in Imola — quickly ended any title ambitions. The team then finished second at Spa, 22 seconds behind winners Team Virage, despite having had to change the chassis during the weekend. Henrion narrowly missed out on pole to Griffin Peebles at Silverstone, but a collision for Adcock caused by two LMP2 cars caused the car to fall back to ninth with heavy damage. At Portimão, Henrion initially claimed pole position, before being disqualified for a non-compliant diffuser. With Henrion being mandated to start the car by the sporting regulations after its laptimes had been deleted, the team was forced into an additional early pit stop which put them a lap down; Henrion charged up to fifth later on. Henrion set the fastest lap of the race and finished eighth in the drivers' standings.

The Le Mans Cup season began discretely, as Henrion and De Doncker finished 12th at Barcelona following a lap 1 puncture and broken rear mount which lost them multiple laps. Henrion charged through to pass Paul Trojani for the lead at Le Castellet and crossed the line first in class, but was demoted to second post-race due to a Full-Course Yellow speeding penalty for De Doncker. Henrion finished third in race 1 of Road to Le Mans, passing Terrence Woodward on the final lap, before taking fourth in race 2. After the summer break, Henrion overcame a FCY penalty caused by himself to this time win at Spa. Unfortunately for the team's title hopes, Silverstone only yielded an eighth place, as De Doncker had to be recovered from the gravel following a spin at Vale. The title fight came to its conclusion in the Algarve: Henrion charged through to second in class during his stint, narrowly missing out on the on-track win and the eventual Pro-Am title by a point. However, due to a post-race penalty for the winning Inter Europol entry, Motorsport98 were promoted to the race win which gave Henrion and De Doncker the necessary points to snatch the title away from Rinaldi Racing.

== Karting record ==
=== Karting career summary ===
Season	Series	Team	Position
2011	Championnat Regional Alsace-Lorraine — Mini Kart		8th
2012	Championnat de France — Minime		54th
2012	Sens Trophy — Minime		15th
2012	Championnat Regional Bourgogne Franche-Comte — Mini Kart		NC†
2012	Championnat Regional Alsace-Lorraine — Mini Kart		?
2012	Coupe de France — Minime		24th
2013	Trophée Interclub — Minime		5th
2013	Championnat de France — Minime		13th
2013	Coupe de France — Minime		11th
2014	Stars of Karting — Minime		**3rd**
2014	Championnat de France — Minime		**2nd**
2014	Championnat Regional Île-de-France — Minime		**3rd**
2014	Coupe de France — Minime		**3rd**
2015	Trophée Interclub — Minime		**2nd**
2015	Trophée Oscar Petit — Minime		4th
2015	National Series Karting — Cadet		17th
2015	Coupe de France — Cadet		**1st**
2015	Challenge Rotax Max France — Cadet		**3rd**
2015	Championnat de France — Cadet		**1st**
2016	WSK Champions Cup — OKJ	Gillian Henrion Racing	NC
2016	South Garda Winter Cup — OKJ	Gillian Henrion Racing	NC
2016	German Karting Championship — Junior	Gillian Henrion Racing	74th
2016	WSK Super Master Series — OKJ	Gillian Henrion Racing	24th
2016	CIK-FIA European Championship — OKJ	Gillian Henrion Racing	21st
2016	Championnat de France — OKJ	Gillian Henrion Racing	31st
2016	IAME International Final — X30 Junior	Gillian Henrion Racing	4th
2016	CIK-FIA World Championship — OKJ	Gillian Henrion Racing	NC
2017	WSK Champions Cup — OKJ	CRG Spa	**2nd**
2017	Andrea Margutti Trophy — OKJ	CRG Spa	4th
2017	WSK Super Master Series — OKJ	CRG Spa	24th
2017	Coupe de France — OKJ		9th
2017	CIK-FIA European Championship — OKJ	Baby Race Srl	22nd
2017	CIK-FIA World Championship — OKJ	Baby Race Srl	55th

=== Complete CIK-FIA Karting European Championship results ===
(key) (Races in bold indicate pole position) (Races in italics indicate fastest lap)

Year	Team	Class	1	2	3	4	5	6	7	8	9	10	11	12	DC	Points
2016	Henrion, Samuel	OKJ	ZUE; QH; 24	ZUE; PF; 12	ZUE; R 15	ADR; QH; 28	ADR; PF; 34	ADR; R DNQ	PRT; QH; 3	PRT; PF; 11	PRT; R 20	GEN; QH; 34	GEN; PF; 7	GEN; R 30	21st	33
2017	Baby Race Srl	OKJ	SAR; QH; 49	SAR; R DNQ	CAY; QH; 32	CAY; R 10	LEM; QH; 6	LEM; R 34	ALA; QH; 35	ALA; R DNQ	KRI; QH; 20	KRI; R 14			22nd	13

=== Complete Karting World Championship results ===
Year	Team	Car	Quali Heats	Main race
2016	(France) Henrion, Samuel	OKJ	37th	DNQ

== Racing record ==
=== Racing career summary ===
Season	Series	Team	Races	Wins	Poles	F/Laps	Podiums	Points	Position
2018	French F4 Championship	FFSA Academy	3	0	0	0	0	—N/a	NC†
2019	French F4 Championship	FFSA Academy	20	1	0	0	5	125	5th
2020	Formula Regional European Championship	Gillian Track Events GTE	22	0	0	0	0	78	10th
2022	Ligier European Series - JS P4	Team Virage	12	11	12	10	12	293	**1st**
2022	Formula Regional European Championship	G4 Racing	2	0	0	0	0	—N/a	NC†
2023	Le Mans Cup - LMP3	Team Virage	7	2	0	0	3	73	**1st**
2023	Ultimate Cup Series - Relais 208	Comte Racing Team	1	0	0	0	0	6	29th‡
2024	European Le Mans Series - LMP3	Team Virage	6	2	0	0	3	90	**3rd**
2025	Le Mans Cup - LMP3 Pro-Am	Motorsport98	7	2	0	2	4	88	**1st**
2025	European Le Mans Series - LMP3	RLR MSport	6	0	0	1	2	48	8th
2026	Le Mans Cup - LMP3	Motorsport98	6	3	1	2	3	121	**1st**
2026	European Le Mans Series - LMP3	DKR Engineering	1	0	0	0	1	15	19th
2026–27	Asian Le Mans Cup – LMP3	Motorsport98							

^{†} As Henrion was a guest driver, he was ineligible for championship points.
‡ Teams' standings
^{*} Season still in progress.

=== Complete French F4 Championship results ===
(key) (Races in bold indicate pole position) (Races in italics indicate fastest lap)

Year	1	2	3	4	5	6	7	8	9	10	11	12	13	14	15	16	17	18	19	20	21	Pos	Points
2018	NOG; 1	NOG; 2	NOG; 3	PAU; 1	PAU; 2	PAU; 3	SPA; 1	SPA; 2	SPA; 3	DIJ; 1	DIJ; 2	DIJ; 3	MAG; 1	MAG; 2	MAG; 3	JER; 1	JER; 2	JER; 3	LEC; 1; 9	LEC; 2; 10	LEC; 3; 7	NC†	0
2019	NOG; 1; 7	NOG; 2; 3	NOG; 3; 5	PAU; 1; 6	PAU; 2; 3	PAU; 3; 7	SPA; 1; 9	SPA; 2; 3	SPA; 3; 6	LÉD; 1; 6	LÉD; 2; 6	LÉD; 3; 6	HUN; 1; 9	HUN; 2; 1	HUN; 3; 9	MAG; 1; 5	MAG; 2; 7	MAG; 3 DNS	LEC; 1; 11	LEC; 2; 6	LEC; 3; 3	5th	129

^{†} As Henrion was a guest driver, he was ineligible for championship points.

=== Complete Formula Regional European Championship results ===
(key) (Races in bold indicate pole position) (Races in italics indicate fastest lap)

Year	Team	1	2	3	4	5	6	7	8	9	10	11	12	13	14	15	16	17	18	19	20	21	22	23	24	Pos	Points
2020	Gillian Track Events GTE	MIS; 1; 8‡	MIS; 2; 10	MIS; 3; 8	LEC; 1; 9	LEC; 2; 8	LEC; 3; 10	RBR; 1 Ret	RBR; 2 Ret	RBR; 3; 8	MUG; 1 DNS	MUG; 2; 4	MUG; 3; 10	MNZ; 1; 6	MNZ; 2 Ret	MNZ; 3 Ret	CAT; 1; 8	CAT; 2; 7	CAT; 3; 9	IMO; 1; 7	IMO; 2; 8	IMO; 3 Ret	VLL; 1; 7	VLL; 2 C	VLL; 3; 8	10th	78
2022	G4 Racing	MNZ; 1	MNZ; 2	IMO; 1	IMO; 2	MCO; 1	MCO; 2	LEC; 1	LEC; 2	ZAN; 1	ZAN; 2	HUN; 1	HUN; 2	SPA; 1	SPA; 1	RBR; 1 Ret	RBR; 2; 20	CAT; 1	CAT; 2	MUG; 1	MUG; 2					NC†	0

^{†} As Henrion was a guest driver, he was ineligible for championship points.
^{‡} Driver did not finish the race, but was classified as they completed more than 90% of the race distance.

=== Complete Ligier European Series results ===
(key) (Races in bold indicate pole position; results in italics indicate fastest lap)

Year	Entrant	Class	Chassis	1	2	3	4	5	6	7	8	9	10	11	12	Rank	Points
2022	Team Virage	JS P4	Ligier JS P4	**LEC**; **1**; 1	**LEC**; **2**; 1	**IMO**; **1**; 1	**IMO**; **2**; 1	**LMS**; **1**; 1	**LMS**; **2**; 1	**MNZ**; **1**; 1	**MNZ**; **2**; 1	**SPA**; **1**; 2	**SPA**; **2**; 1	**ALG**; **1**; 1	**ALG**; **2**; 1	1st	293

=== Complete Le Mans Cup results ===
(key) (Races in bold indicate pole position; results in italics indicate fastest lap)

Year	Entrant	Class	Chassis	1	2	3	4	5	6	7	Rank	Points
2023	Team Virage	LMP3	Ligier JS P320	CAT; 1	LMS; 1; 8	LMS; 2 Ret	LEC; 1	ARA; 2	SPA; 18	**ALG**; 21	1st	73
2025	Motorsport98	LMP3 Pro-Am	Ligier JS P325	CAT; 12	LEC; 2	LMS; 1; 3	LMS; 2; 4	SPA; 1	SIL; 8	ALG; 1	1st	78
2026	Motorsport98	LMP3 Pro-Am	Ligier JS P325	BAR; 6	LEC; 1	**LMS**; 1	SPA; 1	SIL; 4	POR; 4		1st	121

^{*} Season still in progress.

=== Complete European Le Mans Series results ===
(key) (Races in bold indicate pole position; results in italics indicate fastest lap)

Year	Entrant	Class	Chassis	Engine	1	2	3	4	5	6	Rank	Points
2024	Team Virage	LMP3	Ligier JS P320	Nissan VK56DE 5.6L V8	CAT; 1	LEC; 7	IMO; 2	SPA; 6	MUG; 1	ALG; 6	3rd	90
2025	RLR MSport	LMP3	Ligier JS P325	Toyota V35A 3.5 L V6	CAT; 2	LEC; Ret	IMO; Ret	SPA; 2	SIL; 9	ALG; 5	8th	48

^{*} Season still in progress.
