= 2022 Ligier European Series =

Motorsport event

The 2022 Ligier European Series was the third season of the Ligier European Series. The six-event season began at Circuit Paul Ricard on 15 April, and finished at Algarve International Circuit on 15 October.

== Calendar ==
Round	Race	Circuit	Date
1	Le Castellet Heat	(France) Circuit Paul Ricard	15–16 April
2	Imola Heat	(Italy) Imola Circuit	13–14 May
3	Le Mans Heat	(France) Circuit de la Sarthe	8–11 June
4	Monza Heat	(Italy) Autodromo Nazionale di Monza	1–2 July
5	Spa-Francorchamps Heat	(Belgium) Circuit de Spa-Francorchamps	23–24 September
6	Portimao Heat	(Portugal) Algarve International Circuit	14–15 October

== Entries ==
=== Teams and drivers ===
Team	Car	No.	Drivers	Rounds
JS P4
(Italy) LR Motorsport	Ligier JS P4	3	(Italy) Nicola Neri	All
(Italy) LR Motorsport	Ligier JS P4	3	(Italy) Simone Riccitelli	All
(Luxembourg) DKR Engineering by HRC	Ligier JS P4	9	(Belgium) Tom van Rompuy	3
(Luxembourg) DKR Engineering by HRC	Ligier JS P4	9	(Belgium) Kris Cools	3
(Italy) HP Racing by EuroInternational	Ligier JS P4	12	(Italy) Jacopo Faccioni	1–4
(Italy) HP Racing by EuroInternational	Ligier JS P4	12	(Italy) Andrea Dromedari	1–2
(Italy) HP Racing by EuroInternational	Ligier JS P4	12	(Japan) Masaki Tanaka	3
(Poland) Team Virage	Ligier JS P4	16	(France) Gillian Henrion	All
(Poland) Team Virage	Ligier JS P4	21	Vyacheslav Gutak (Note: Vyacheslav Gutak is Russian, but competes as a neutral competitor as Russian national emblems were banned by the FIA due to the Russian invasion of Ukraine.)	3
(Poland) Team Virage	Ligier JS P4	21	(Italy) Alessandro Bracalente	3
(Poland) Team Virage	Ligier JS P4	43	(Portugal) Bernardo Pinheiro	6
(Poland) Team Virage	Ligier JS P4	43	(Portugal) José Maria Marreiros	6
(France) Pegasus Racing	Ligier JS P4	17	(France) Dimitri Enjalbert	All
(France) Pegasus Racing	Ligier JS P4	17	(France) Anthony Nahra	All
(Italy) Monza Garage	Ligier JS P4	23	(United Kingdom) George King	All
(Italy) Monza Garage	Ligier JS P4	23	(Italy) Ronnie Valori	1–5
(Italy) Monza Garage	Ligier JS P4	99	(Taiwan) Wang Ray Yu	4
(France) Les Deux Arbres	Ligier JS P4	33	(France) Jacques Nicolet	1, 3–6
(France) Les Deux Arbres	Ligier JS P4	33	(Switzerland) Steve Zacchia	1
(France) Les Deux Arbres	Ligier JS P4	33	(France) Thomas Duchene	3
(France) Les Deux Arbres	Ligier JS P4	33	(France) Erwin Creed	5
(France) Les Deux Arbres	Ligier JS P4	33	(France) Louis Rossi	6
(France) Les Deux Arbres	Ligier JS P4	50	(France) Philippe Haezebrouck	1
(France) Les Deux Arbres	Ligier JS P4	50	(United States) Kevin Madsen	3
(France) Les Deux Arbres	Ligier JS P4	50	(United States) Lance Fenton	3
(France) Les Deux Arbres	Ligier JS P4	50	(France) Raymond Narac	6
(France) Les Deux Arbres	Ligier JS P4	50	(France) Raphaël Narac	6
(Romania) Smart Driving	Ligier JS P4	44	(Romania) Alexandru Mirea	1–5
(Romania) Smart Driving	Ligier JS P4	44	(Romania) Philip Andriescu	1–3
(Romania) Smart Driving	Ligier JS P4	44	(Romania) Mihnea Ștefan	6
(Romania) Smart Driving	Ligier JS P4	85	(Romania) Andrei Vajda	2–6
(Romania) Smart Driving	Ligier JS P4	85	(Romania) Emil Nestor	2
(France) M Racing	Ligier JS P4	53	(France) Natan Bihel	All
JS2 R
(France) M3	Ligier JS2 R	2	(France) Stéphane Adler	3
(France) M3	Ligier JS2 R	2	(France) Mickaël Mota	3
(France) M3	Ligier JS2 R	27	(France) Vincent Congnet	3
(France) M3	Ligier JS2 R	27	(France) Jean Christophe David	3
(France) M3	Ligier JS2 R	63	(France) Sylvain Caroff	3
(France) M3	Ligier JS2 R	63	(France) Vincent Roches	3
(Switzerland) Cool Racing	Ligier JS2 R	4	(Switzerland) Cédric Oltramare	All
(Romania) Smart Driving	Ligier JS2 R	5	(Romania) Bogdan Dobranici	1
(Romania) Smart Driving	Ligier JS2 R	5	(Romania) Ovidiu Zaberca	1
(Romania) Smart Driving	Ligier JS2 R	22	(Romania) Radu Dumitrescu	1–5
(Romania) Smart Driving	Ligier JS2 R	22	(Romania) Marian Oancea	1–5
(Romania) Smart Driving	Ligier JS2 R	22	(Romania) Bogdan Dobranici	6
(Romania) Smart Driving	Ligier JS2 R	22	(Romania) Mihai Zamfir	6
(France) ANS Motorsport	Ligier JS2 R	6	(France) Mathys Jaubert	3
(France) ANS Motorsport	Ligier JS2 R	6	(France) Grégory Segers	3
(France) SK Racing	Ligier JS2 R	7	(France) Franco Lemma	3
(France) SK Racing	Ligier JS2 R	7	(France) Jérome Dacosta	3
(France) Pôle Position 81	Ligier JS2 R	8	(France) Gregor Raymondis	3
(France) Pôle Position 81	Ligier JS2 R	8	(France) Franck Coibion	3
(France) Zosh - Di Environnement (France) Zosh - Formula Concept (France) Zosh - Groupe Dirob	Ligier JS2 R	10	(France) Hugo Rosati	3
(France) Zosh - Di Environnement (France) Zosh - Formula Concept (France) Zosh - Groupe Dirob	Ligier JS2 R	10	(France) Jean-René de Fournoux	3
(France) Zosh - Di Environnement (France) Zosh - Formula Concept (France) Zosh - Groupe Dirob	Ligier JS2 R	46	(France) Pascal Roux	3
(France) Zosh - Di Environnement (France) Zosh - Formula Concept (France) Zosh - Groupe Dirob	Ligier JS2 R	46	(France) Frederic Fauchere	3
(France) Zosh - Di Environnement (France) Zosh - Formula Concept (France) Zosh - Groupe Dirob	Ligier JS2 R	93	(France) Didier Robin	3
(France) Zosh - Di Environnement (France) Zosh - Formula Concept (France) Zosh - Groupe Dirob	Ligier JS2 R	93	(France) Nicolas Beloou	3
(France) TM Evolution	Ligier JS2 R	11	(France) Alain Grand	All
(France) TM Evolution	Ligier JS2 R	11	(France) Laurent Prunet	1–2
(France) TM Evolution	Ligier JS2 R	11	(France) Olivier Biotteau	3
(France) TM Evolution	Ligier JS2 R	11	(France) Paul Jouffreau	4
(France) TM Evolution	Ligier JS2 R	11	(Belgium) Mathieu Detry	5
(France) TM Evolution	Ligier JS2 R	11	(France) Simon Escallier	6
(France) TM Evolution	Ligier JS2 R	25	(France) Bruno Chaudet	All
(France) TM Evolution	Ligier JS2 R	25	(France) Freddy Menanteau	All
(France) TM Evolution	Ligier JS2 R	66	(France) Philippe Lefaure	3
(France) TM Evolution	Ligier JS2 R	66	(France) Laurent Prunet	3
(France) Extrême Limite	Ligier JS2 R	19	(France) Benjamin Redais	3
(France) Extrême Limite	Ligier JS2 R	19	(France) Eric Jacquet	3
(France) Orhès Racing	Ligier JS2 R	24	(France) Mathieu Martins	3
(France) Orhès Racing	Ligier JS2 R	24	(France) Tanguy Ide	3
(France) Orhès Racing	Ligier JS2 R	42	(France) François Pigeat	3
(France) Orhès Racing	Ligier JS2 R	42	(United Kingdom) Adrian Watt	3
(France) Pegasus Racing	Ligier JS2 R	29	(France) David Caussanel	1–4
(France) Pegasus Racing	Ligier JS2 R	29	(France) Christophe Weber	1–2, 4–5
(France) Pegasus Racing	Ligier JS2 R	29	(France) Christophe Rousseau	3
(France) Pegasus Racing	Ligier JS2 R	29	(France) Julien Schell	5
(France) LADC Motorsport (France) Massé Motorsport by LADC	Ligier JS2 R	35	(United States) Jason McCarthy	3
(France) LADC Motorsport (France) Massé Motorsport by LADC	Ligier JS2 R	48	(France) Martin Massé	3
(France) LADC Motorsport (France) Massé Motorsport by LADC	Ligier JS2 R	48	(France) Antoine Massé	3
(France) LADC Motorsport (France) Massé Motorsport by LADC	Ligier JS2 R	72	(France) Paul Cocaign	3
(France) LADC Motorsport (France) Massé Motorsport by LADC	Ligier JS2 R	72	(France) Xavier Follenfant	3
(United Kingdom) RLR MSport	Ligier JS2 R	40	(Austria) Horst Felix Felbermayr	All
(United Kingdom) RLR MSport	Ligier JS2 R	75	(Kuwait) Haytham Qarajouli	All
(United Kingdom) RLR MSport	Ligier JS2 R	75	(United Kingdom) Martin Rich	6
(France) M Racing	Ligier JS2 R	69	(France) Laurent Millara	All
(France) No Limit Racing	Ligier JS2 R	78	(France) Sébastien Margot	3
(Italy) Granducato	Ligier JS2 R	81	(Italy) Paolo Frullini	2
(France) CTF Performance	Ligier JS2 R	95	(France) Nicolas Beraud	1, 3
(France) CTF Performance	Ligier JS2 R	95	(France) Alban Varutti	3
(France) CTF Performance	Ligier JS2 R	95	(France) Gilles Poret	6
(France) CTF Performance	Ligier JS2 R	96	(France) Fabien Delaplace	All
(France) CTF Performance	Ligier JS2 R	96	(France) Laurent Piguet	All
EntryLists:

== Results ==
Bold indicates overall winner.

Rnd.		Circuit	JS P4 Winning Team	JS2 R Winning Team	Results
Rnd.		Circuit	JS P4 Winning Drivers	JS2 R Winning Drivers	Results
1	R1	(France) Circuit Paul Ricard	(Poland) No. 16 Team Virage	(United Kingdom) No. 75 RLR MSport	Race results
1	R1	(France) Circuit Paul Ricard	(France) Gillian Henrion	(Kuwait) Haytham Qarajouli	Race results
1	R2	(France) Circuit Paul Ricard	(Poland) No. 16 Team Virage	(France) No. 95 CTF Performance	Race results
1	R2	(France) Circuit Paul Ricard	(France) Gillian Henrion	(France) Nicolas Beraud	Race results
2	R1	(Italy) Imola	(Poland) No. 16 Team Virage	(United Kingdom) No. 75 RLR MSport	Race results
2	R1	(Italy) Imola	(France) Gillian Henrion	(Kuwait) Haytham Qarajouli	Race results
2	R2	(Italy) Imola	(Poland) No. 16 Team Virage	(United Kingdom) No. 75 RLR MSport	Race results
2	R2	(Italy) Imola	(France) Gillian Henrion	(Kuwait) Haytham Qarajouli	Race results
3	R1	(France) Le Mans	(Poland) No. 16 Team Virage	(France) No. 10 Zosh - Di Environnement	Race results
3	R1	(France) Le Mans	(France) Gillian Henrion	(France) Hugo Rosati (France) Jean-René de Fournoux	Race results
3	R2	(France) Le Mans	(Poland) No. 16 Team Virage	(France) No. 10 Zosh - Di Environnement	Race results
3	R2	(France) Le Mans	(France) Gillian Henrion	(France) Hugo Rosati (France) Jean-René de Fournoux	Race results
4	R1	(Italy) Autodromo Nazionale di Monza	(Poland) No. 16 Team Virage	(Switzerland) No. 4 Cool Racing	Race results
4	R1	(Italy) Autodromo Nazionale di Monza	(France) Gillian Henrion	(Switzerland) Cédric Oltramare	Race results
4	R2	(Italy) Autodromo Nazionale di Monza	(Poland) No. 16 Team Virage	(United Kingdom) No. 75 RLR MSport	Race results
4	R2	(Italy) Autodromo Nazionale di Monza	(France) Gillian Henrion	(Kuwait) Haytham Qarajouli	Race results
5	R1	(Belgium) Circuit de Spa-Francorchamps	(France) No. 53 M Racing	(France) No. 96 CTF Performance	Race results
5	R1	(Belgium) Circuit de Spa-Francorchamps	(France) Natan Bihel	(France) Fabien Delaplace (France) Laurent Piguet	Race results
5	R2	(Belgium) Circuit de Spa-Francorchamps	(Poland) No. 16 Team Virage	(United Kingdom) No. 75 RLR MSport	Race results
5	R2	(Belgium) Circuit de Spa-Francorchamps	(France) Gillian Henrion	(Kuwait) Haytham Qarajouli	Race results
6	R1	(Portugal) Algarve International Circuit	(Poland) No. 16 Team Virage	(France) No. 96 CTF Performance	Race results
6	R1	(Portugal) Algarve International Circuit	(France) Gillian Henrion	(France) Fabien Delaplace (France) Laurent Piguet	Race results
6	R2	(Portugal) Algarve International Circuit	(Poland) No. 16 Team Virage	(United Kingdom) No. 40 RLR MSport	Race results
6	R2	(Portugal) Algarve International Circuit	(France) Gillian Henrion	(Austria) Horst Felix Felbermayr	Race results

== Championships ==
=== JS P4 Drivers ===
Pos.	Driver	Team	LEC (France)		IMO (Italy)		LMS (France)		MNZ (Italy)		SPA (Belgium)		POR (Portugal)		Points
Pos.	Driver	Team	R1	R2	R1	R2	R1	R2	R1	R2	R1	R2	R1	R2	Points
1	(France) Gillian Henrion	(Poland) Team Virage	1	1	1	1	1	1	1	1	2	1	1	1	293
2	(France) Natan Bihel	(France) M Racing	4	2	2	2	3	2	2	3	1	5	2	3	200
3	(United Kingdom) George King	(Italy) Monza Garage	3	3	3	4	5	3	3	5	5	DNS	5	5	137
4	(Italy) Ronnie Valori	(Italy) Monza Garage	3	3	3	4	5	3	3	5	5	DNS			117
5	(Italy) Nicola Neri (Italy) Simone Riccitelli	(Italy) LR Motorsport	2	4	Ret	5	8	8	8	6	6	6	6	2	102
6	(France) Dimitri Enjalbert (France) Anthony Nahra	(France) Pegasus Racing	5	5	4	3	2	Ret	Ret	8	3	Ret	8	4	100
7	(Romania) Alexandru Mirea	(Romania) Smart Driving	7	7	5	6	9	4	9	2	4	4			88
8	(Romania) Andrei Vajda	(Romania) Smart Driving			8	7	4	Ret	4	4	Ret	2	7	7	78
9	(France) Jacques Nicolet	(France) Les Deux Arbres	6	6			11	9	5	7	Ret	3	9	9	53
10	(Romania) Philip Andriescu	(Romania) Smart Driving	7	7	5	6	9	4							44
11	(Romania) Mihnea Ștefan	(Romania) Smart Driving											3	6	23
12	(Belgium) Tom van Rompuy (Belgium) Kris Cools	(Luxembourg) DKR Engineering by HRC					6	5							18
13	(Switzerland) Steve Zacchia	(France) Les Deux Arbres	6	6											16
14	(Italy) Jacopo Faccioni	(Italy) HP Racing by Eurointernational	Ret	DNS	6	Ret	Ret	Ret	6	Ret					16
15	(France) Erwin Creed	(France) Les Deux Arbres									Ret	3			15
16	(France) Raymond Narac (France) Raphaël Narac	(France) Les Deux Arbres											4	10	13
17	(Romania) Emil Nestor	(Romania) Smart Driving			8	7									12
18	(United States) Kevin Madsen (United States) Lance Fenton	(France) Les Deux Arbres					7	7							12
19	Vyacheslav Gutak (Italy) Alessandro Bracalente	(Poland) Team Virage					10	6							9
20	(Italy) Andrea Dromedari	(Italy) HP Racing by Eurointernational	Ret	DNS	6	Ret									8
21	(France) Philippe Haezebrouck	(France) Les Deux Arbres	8	8											8
22	(Taiwan) Wang Ray-Yu	(Italy) Monza Garage							7	Ret					6
23	(Portugal) Bernardo Pinheiro (Portugal) José Maria Marreiros	(Poland) Team Virage											10	8	5
24	(France) Louis Rossi	(France) Les Deux Arbres											9	9	4
25	(France) Thomas Duchene	(France) Les Deux Arbres					11	9							2
26	(Japan) Masaki Tanaka	(Italy) HP Racing by EuroInternational					Ret	WD							0
–	(France) Hervé Roger	(France) HRC	WD	WD											-
Standings:

=== JS2 R Drivers ===
Pos.	Driver	Team	LEC (France)		IMO (Italy)		LMS (France)		MNZ (Italy)		SPA (Belgium)		POR (Portugal)		Points
Pos.	Driver	Team	R1	R2	R1	R2	R1	R2	R1	R2	R1	R2	R1	R2	Points
1	(Kuwait) Haytham Qarajouli	(United Kingdom) RLR MSport	1	2	1	1	4	12	4	1	Ret	1	Ret	2	185
2	(France) Fabien Delaplace (France) Laurent Piguet	(France) CTF Performance	2	Ret	6	2	9	16	2	4	1	6	1	4	146
3	(France) Laurent Millara	(France) M Racing	4	3	2	3	10	10	6	3	4	3	3	6	135
4	(Austria) Horst Felix Felbermayr	(United Kingdom) RLR MSport	3	7	3	8	Ret	22	5	Ret	2	Ret	2	1	111
5	(France) Bruno Chaudet (France) Freddy Menanteau	(France) TM Evolution	5	5	4	4	14	Ret	7	Ret	3	4	7	5	93
6	(Switzerland) Cédric Oltramare	(Switzerland) Cool Racing	Ret	Ret	Ret	Ret	Ret	Ret	1	2	Ret	2	4	Ret	73
7	(France) Alain Grand	(France) TM Evolution	6	4	5	7	12	13	Ret	Ret	Ret	5	5	Ret	56
8	(France) Hugo Rosati (France) Jean-René de Fournoux	(France) Zosh - Di Environnement					1	1							50
9	(France) Nicolas Beraud	(France) CTF Performance	Ret	1			3	6							48
10	(France) David Caussanel	(France) Pegasus Racing	Ret	6	7	6	17	18	3	5					47
11	(France) Christophe Weber	(France) Pegasus Racing	Ret	6	7	6			3	5					47
12	(France) Mathys Jaubert (France) Grégory Segers	(France) ANS Motorsport					2	2							36
13	(France) Laurent Prunet	(France) TM Evolution	6	4	5	7									36
14	(Romania) Radu Dumitrescu (Romania) Marian Oancea	(Romania) Smart Driving	8	9	8	5	21	15	8	6					32
15	(France) Paul Cocaign (France) Xavier Follenfant	(France) LADC Motorsport					5	3							25
16	(France) Alban Varutti	(France) CTF Performance					3	6							23
17	(France) Gilles Poret	(France) CTF Performance											6	3	23
18	(Romania) Bogdan Dobranici	(Romania) Smart Driving	7	8									8	7	20
19	(United Kingdom) Martin Rich	(United Kingdom) RLR MSport											Ret	2	18
20	(France) Sylvain Caroff (France) Vincent Roches	(France) M3					13	4							12
21	(France) Stéphane Adler (France) Mickaël Mota	(France) M3					7	7							12
22	(France) Pascal Roux (France) Frederic Fauchere	(France) Zosh - Formula Concept					16	5							10
23	(Belgium) Mathieu Detry	(France) TM Evolution									Ret	5			10
24	(France) Simon Escallier	(France) TM Evolution											5	Ret	10
25	(Romania) Ovidiu Zaberca	(Romania) Smart Driving	7	8											10
26	(Romania) Mihai Zamfir	(Romania) Smart Driving											8	7	10
27	(France) Vincent Congnet (France) Jean Christophe David	(France) M3					6	Ret							8
28	(France) Martin Massé (France) Antoine Massé	(France) Massé Motorsport by LADC					8	8							8
29	(United States) Jason McCarthy	(France) LADC Motorsport					Ret	9							2
30	(France) Franco Lemma (France) Jérome Dacosta	(France) SK Racing					18	11							0
30	(France) Olivier Biotteau	(France) TM Evolution					12	13							0
30	(France) Didier Robin (France) Nicolas Beloou	(France) Zosh - Groupe Dirob					20	14							0
30	(France) Sébastien Margot	(France) No Limit Racing					15	17							0
30	(France) Christophe Rousseau	(France) Pegasus Racing					17	18							0
30	(France) Philippe Lefaure (France) Laurent Prunet	(France) TM Evolution					19	21							0
30	(France) Benjamin Redais (France) Eric Jacquet	(France) Extrême Limite					22	19							0
30	(France) François Pigeat (United Kingdom) Adrian Watt	(France) Orhès Racing					23	20							0
31	(France) Gregor Raymondis (France) Franck Coibion	(France) Pôle Position 81					11	Ret							0
32	(France) Mathieu Martins (France) Tanguy Ide	(France) Orhès Racing					Ret	Ret							0
33	(France) Paul Jouffreau	(France) TM Evolution							Ret	Ret					0
34	(Italy) Paolo Frullini	(Italy) Granducato			Ret	WD									0
Standings:

=== JS P4 Teams ===
Pos.	Team	LEC (France)		IMO (Italy)		LMS (France)		MNZ (Italy)		SPA (Belgium)		POR (Portugal)		Points
Pos.	Team	R1	R2	R1	R2	R1	R2	R1	R2	R1	R2	R1	R2	Points
1	(Poland) #16 Team Virage	1	1	1	1	1	1	1	1	2	1	1	1	293
2	(France) #53 M Racing	4	2	2	2	3	2	2	3	1	5	2	3	200
3	(Italy) #23 Monza Garage	3	3	3	4	5	3	3	5	5	DNS	5	5	137
4	(Romania) #44 Smart Driving	7	7	5	6	9	4	9	2	4	4	3	6	111
5	(Italy) #3 LR Motorsport	2	4	Ret	5	8	8	8	6	6	6	6	2	102
6	(France) #17 Pegasus Racing	5	5	4	3	2	Ret	Ret	8	3	Ret	8	4	100
7	(Romania) #85 Smart Driving			7	7	4	Ret	4	4	Ret	2	7	7	78
8	(France) #33 Les Deux Arbres	6	6			11	9	5	7	Ret	3	9	9	53
9	(France) #50 Les Deux Arbres	8	8			7	7					4	10	33
10	(Luxembourg) #9 DKR Engineering by HRC					6	5							18
11	(Italy) #12 HP Racing	Ret	DNS	6	Ret	Ret	Ret	6	Ret					16
12	(Poland) #21 Team Virage					10	6							9
13	(Italy) #99 Monza Garage							7	Ret					6
14	(Poland) #43 Team Virage											10	8	5
Standings:

=== JS2 R Teams ===
Pos.	Team	LEC (France)		IMO (Italy)		LMS (France)		MNZ (Italy)		SPA (Belgium)		POR (Portugal)		Points
Pos.	Team	R1	R2	R1	R2	R1	R2	R1	R2	R1	R2	R1	R2	Points
1	(United Kingdom) #75 RLR MSport	1	2	1	1	4	12	4	1	Ret	1	Ret	2	185
2	(France) #96 CTF Performance	2	Ret	6	2	9	16	2	4	1	6	1	4	146
3	(France) #69 M Racing	4	3	2	3	10	10	6	3	4	3	3	6	135
4	(United Kingdom) #40 RLR MSport	3	7	3	8	Ret	22	5	Ret	2	Ret	2	1	111
5	(France) #25 TM Evolution	5	5	4	4	14	Ret	7	Ret	3	4	7	5	93
6	(Switzerland) #4 Cool Racing	Ret	Ret	Ret	Ret	Ret	Ret	1	2	Ret	2	4	Ret	73
7	(France) #95 CTF Performance	Ret	1			3	6					6	3	71
8	(France) #11 TM Evolution	6	4	5	7	12	13	Ret	Ret	Ret	5	5	Ret	56
9	(France) #10 Zosh - Di Environnement					1	1							50
10	(France) #29 Pegasus Racing	Ret	6	7	6	17	18	3	5					47
11	(Romania) #22 Smart Driving	8	9	8	5	21	15	8	6			8	7	42
12	(France) #6 ANS Motorsport					2	2							36
13	(France) #72 LADC Motorsport					5	3							25
14	(France) #63 M3					13	4							12
15	(France) #2 M3					7	7							12
16	(France) #46 Zosh - Formula Concept					16	5							10
17	(Romania) #5 Smart Driving	7	8											10
18	(France) #27 M3					6	Ret							8
19	(France) #48 Massé Motorsport by LADC					8	8							8
20	(France) #35 LADC Motorsport					Ret	9							2
21	(France) #7 SK Racing					18	11							0
21	(France) #93 Zosh - Groupe Dirob					20	14							0
21	(France) #78 No Limit Racing					15	17							0
21	(France) #66 TM Evolution					19	21							0
21	(France) #19 Extrême Limite					22	19							0
21	(France) #42 Orhès Racing					23	20							0
22	(France) #8 Pôle Position 81					11	Ret							0
23	(France) #24 Orhès Racing					Ret	Ret							0
24	(Italy) #81 Granducato			Ret	WD									0
Standings:
