= Inter Europol Competition =

Polish motorsports team

(Poland) Inter Europol Competition
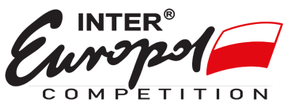
- Founded: 2010
- Founder(s): Wojciech Śmiechowski
- Base: Warsaw metropolitan area, Małopole, Poland
- Team principal(s): Wojciech Śmiechowski (Team Owner); Jakub Śmiechowski (Team Principal); Sascha Fassbender (Team Director); Aleksander Jeżewski (Chief Operating Officer)
- Current series: IMSA SportsCar Championship; European Le Mans Series; Asian Le Mans Series; Le Mans Cup
- Former series: Formula Renault 2.0 NEC; BOSS GP; V de V Endurance Series; FIA World Endurance Championship
- Teams' Championships: 2 (Asian Le Mans Series 2018–19 LMP3, IMSA SportsCar Championship 2024 LMP2)
- Website: https://intereuropolcompetition.eu/en/

Inter Europol Competition is a Polish auto racing team that competes in endurance racing. The team contested the 24 Hours of Le Mans, IMSA SportsCar Championship, European Le Mans Series, Asian Le Mans Series and Le Mans Cup in 2026. As a reference to the focus of its owner and sponsor, the bakery goods producer Inter Europol SA, the team is often referred to as Turbo Piekarze (Turbo Bakers).

Since 2023 the team established itself as one of the most successful sports car racing teams, having scored three victories in the 24 Hours of Le Mans, class championship and runner-up title of the IMSA SportsCar Championship and multiple runner-up titles of the FIA World Endurance Championship and European Le Mans Series.

== History ==
=== 2010-2015: Pre-endurance efforts ===
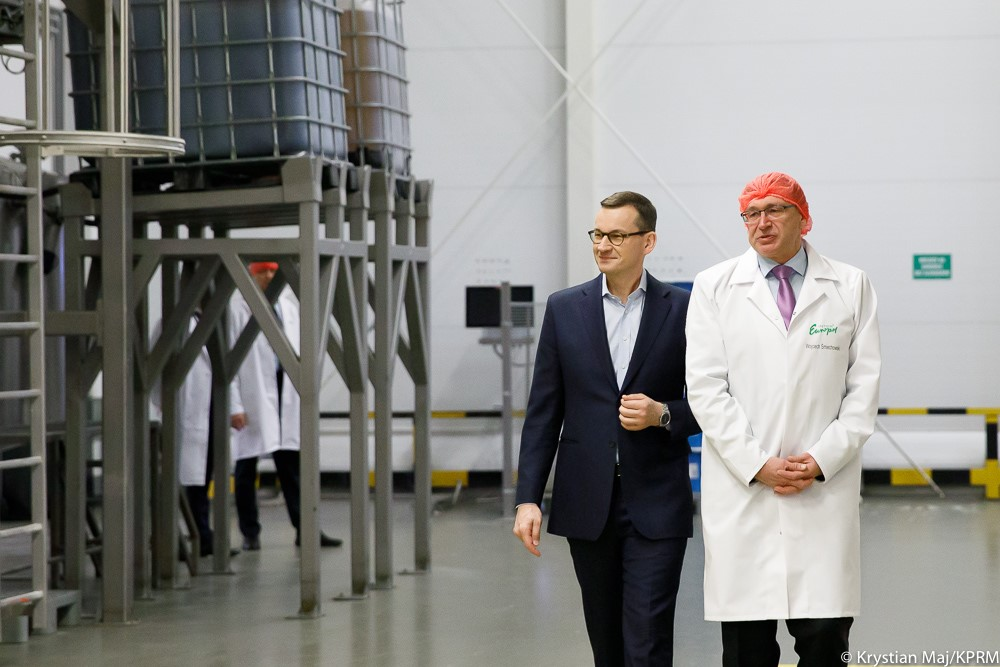
Wojciech Śmiechowski, team owner, with the former Prime Minister of Poland Mateusz Morawiecki in Inter Europol's factory in Małopole

The team was founded in 2010 and grew out of a cooperation between Maurycy Kochański's Kochanski Motorsport and Michael Keese Motorsport. Their joint effort competed first in Formula Ford and Formula Three, then in 2009 in the Italian Formula Renault Championship and in 2010 in the Formula Renault 2.0 Northern European Cup. At the end of the 2010 season, Kochański ran into financial problems. His share in the team was taken over by Wojciech Śmiechowski, father of its driver Jakub Śmiechowski and owner of the Inter Europol SA bakery. The new team was named Inter Europol Competition after its new owner-sponsor.

Inter Europol Competition started as a single-seater team. Inter Europol's drivers competed in the Formula Renault 2.0 Northern European Cup in the 2010–2016 seasons, with team's drivers' best overall result being 12th by Jakub Śmiechowski in the 2011 season. 2014 marked the beginning of 6-years long team's effort in BOSS GP, which championship was claimed by Jakub Śmiechowski in that year. Śmiechowski also finished as the runner-up in the 2015 season.

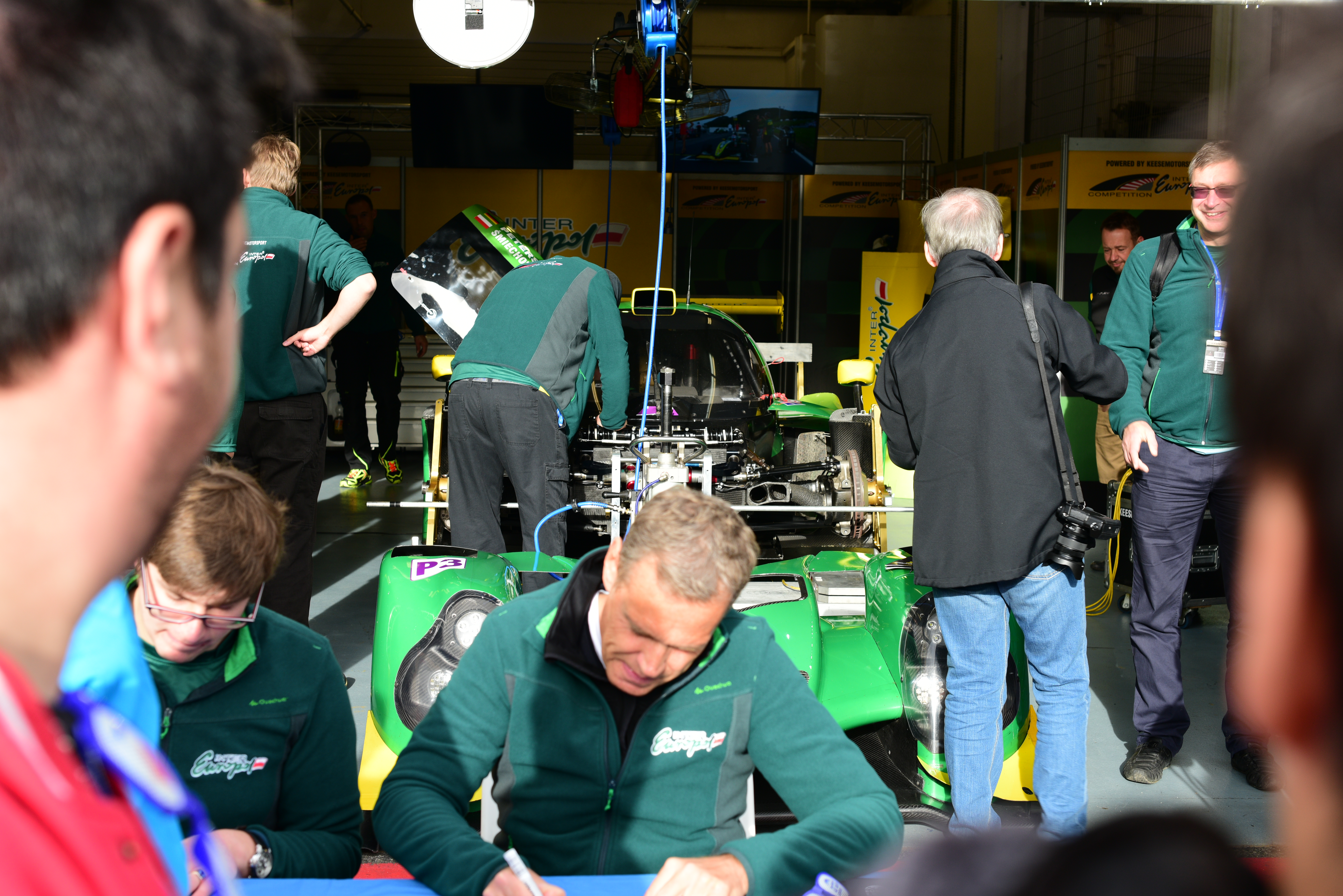
Jakub Śmiechowski and Jens Petersen at the autograph session at the 2016 4 Hours of Estoril

=== 2016-2018: Beginnings in endurance racing ===
2016 marked an important milestone for Inter Europol Competition as the team made its full European Le Mans Series and 2016 V de V Endurance Series entries, taking first steps in the endurance racing. The maiden LMP3 campaign in the ELMS with Jakub Śmiechowski and Jens Petersen driving the Ligier JS P3 brought the team 10th place overall. The effort in the V de V was more successful, as Śmiechowski paired with Martin Hippe claimed the championship of the series.

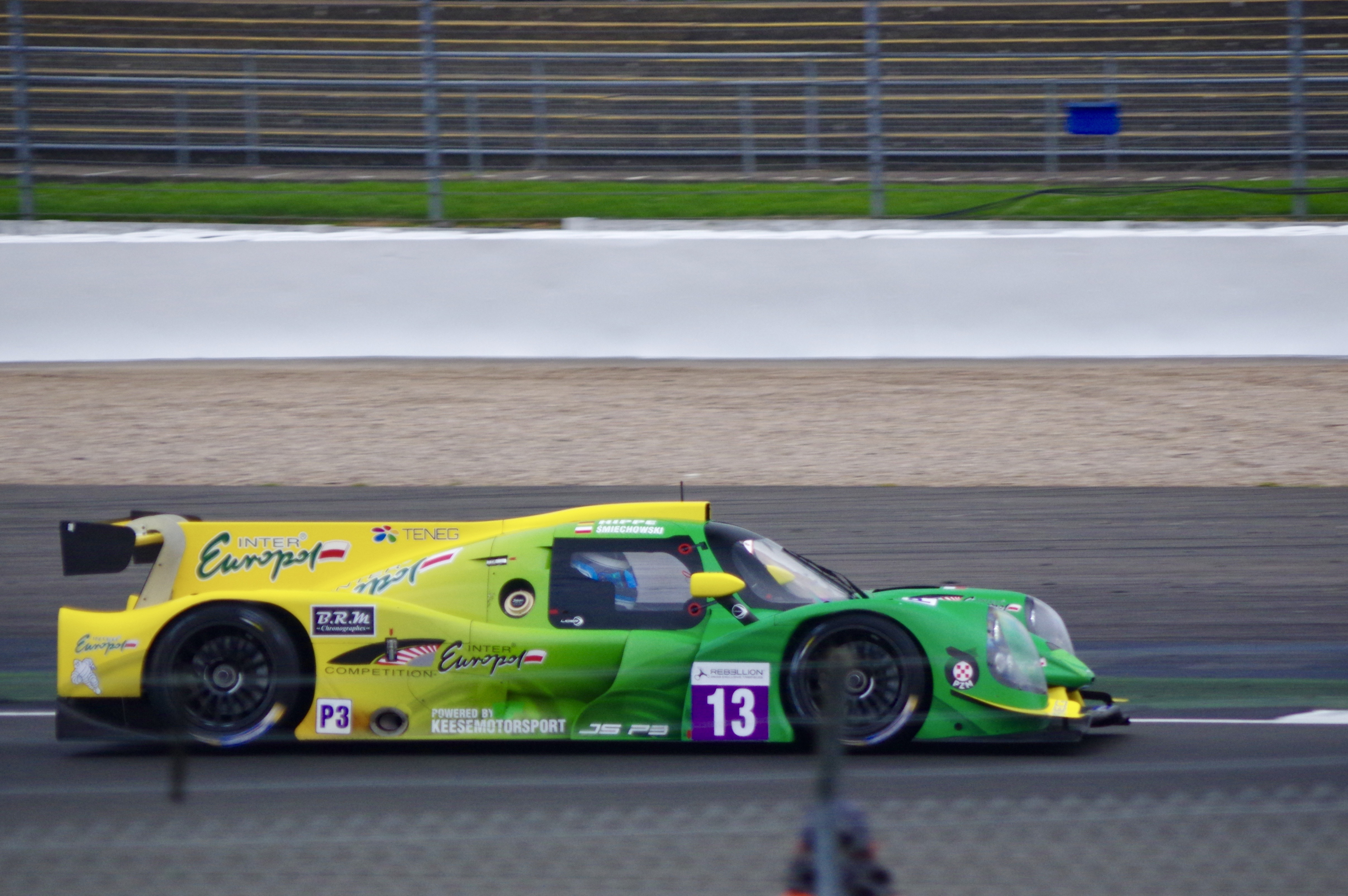
Inter Europol Competition's Ligier JS P3 at the 2017 4 Hours of Silverstone

In their second year in the endurance racing Inter Europol Competition continued their effort in the European Le Mans Series, bringing to the 2017 field a single LMP3 car, Ligier JS P3 number 13. Jens Petersen has been replaced by Martin Hippe, who became team's regular ELMS driver in the years to come. After scoring their maiden podium in the 4 Hours of Castellet, the team achieved a fifth-place finish in the general LMP3 standings. The team entered the V de V Endurance Series as well, claiming the championship with a car number 22 with Jakub Śmiechowski and Hendrik Still behind the wheel. The best of the #33 car drivers, Paul Scheuschner, finished eighth.

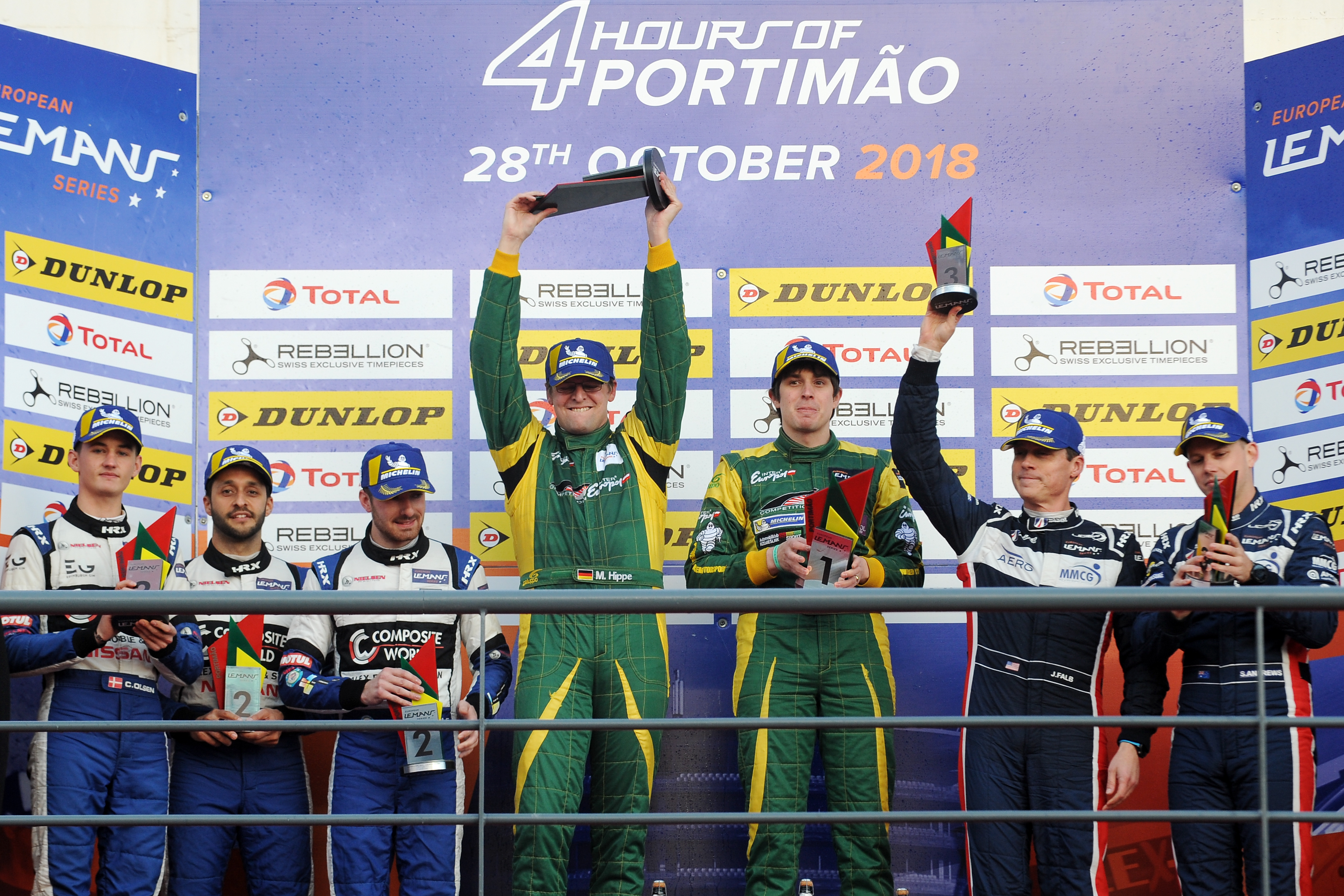
Martin Hippe and Jakub Śmiechowski in Ligier JS P3 won the 2018 4 Hours of Portimão, earning the title of the Vice Champions of the ELMS LMP3

In 2018, Inter Europol Competition once again entered the LMP3 class of the European Le Mans Series, this time with two Ligier JS P3 cars. 2018 was a breakthrough for a car number 13, as Martin Hippe and Jakub Śmiechowski scored a race win in 4 Hours of Portimão and a third place in 4 Hours of Red Bull Ring – two podiums in total - to finish runners-up in the championship standings. A new entry from the team, car number 14, hosted a total of six drivers in six races, resulting in 15th place in the final LMP3 classification. 2018 also marked the final run of Inter Europol Competition in the V de V Endurance series. Paul Scheuschner, driving a car number 33, finished 3rd in the general standings, while the pair of Jakub Śmiechowski and Pontus Fredriksson in a car number 22 claimed 5th overall. In the first years in the endurance racing Inter Europol Competition remained in the BOSS GP series, however, without Jakub Śmiechowski behind the wheel. The best result was Walter Seding’s fourth overall in the 2018 season.

=== 2019-2020: Le Mans and LMP2 debuts ===
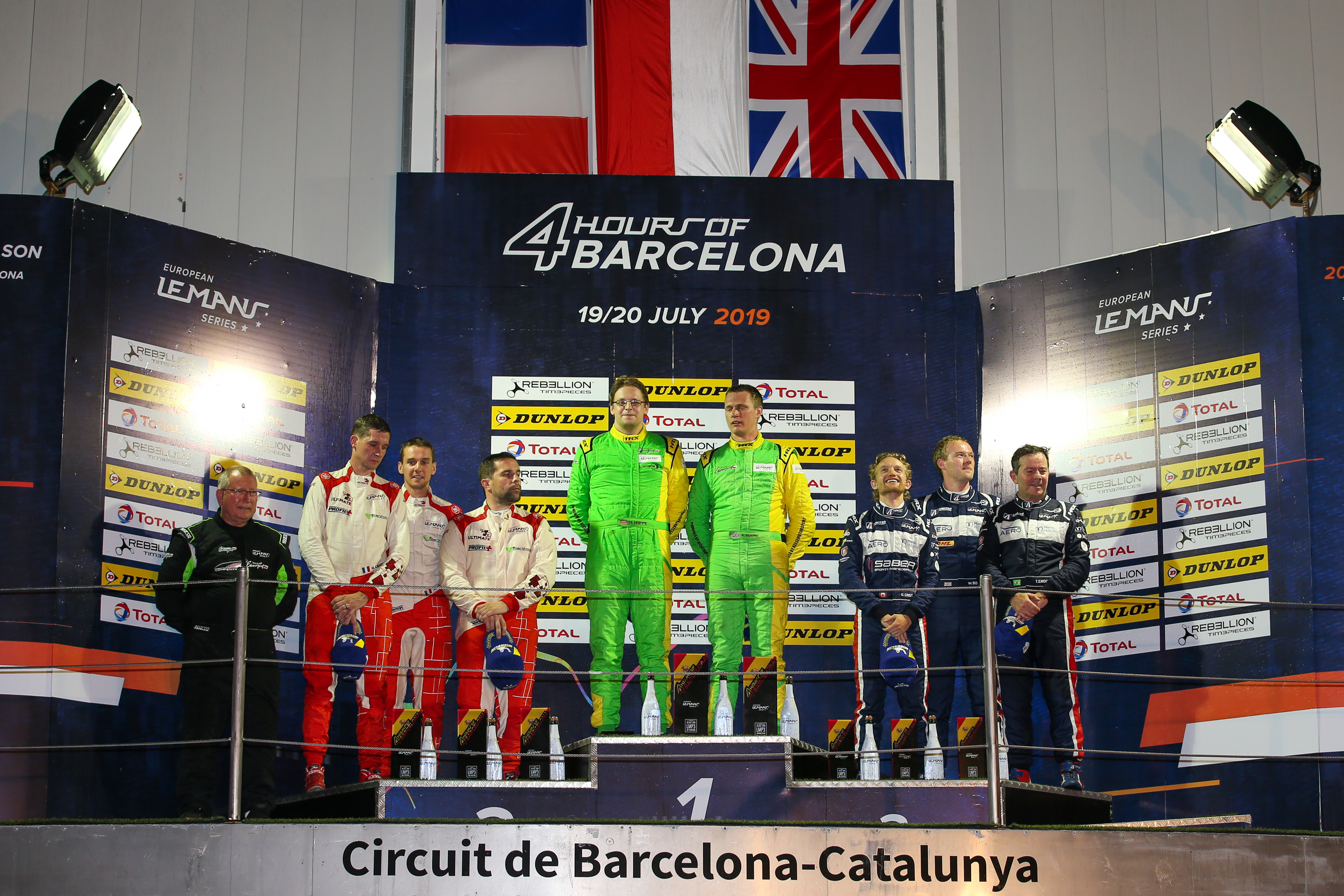
Martin Hippe and Nigel Moore at the top of the podium of the 4 Hours of Barcelona 2019

The new season of 2019 saw Inter Europol Competition branching out into new territory of Asian Le Mans Series with Martin Hippe and Jakub Śmiechowski behind the wheel of a number 13 Ligier JS P3 car. The campaign proved to be successful for the team, which claimed the overall victory and an invitation for the 2019 24 Hours of Le Mans.

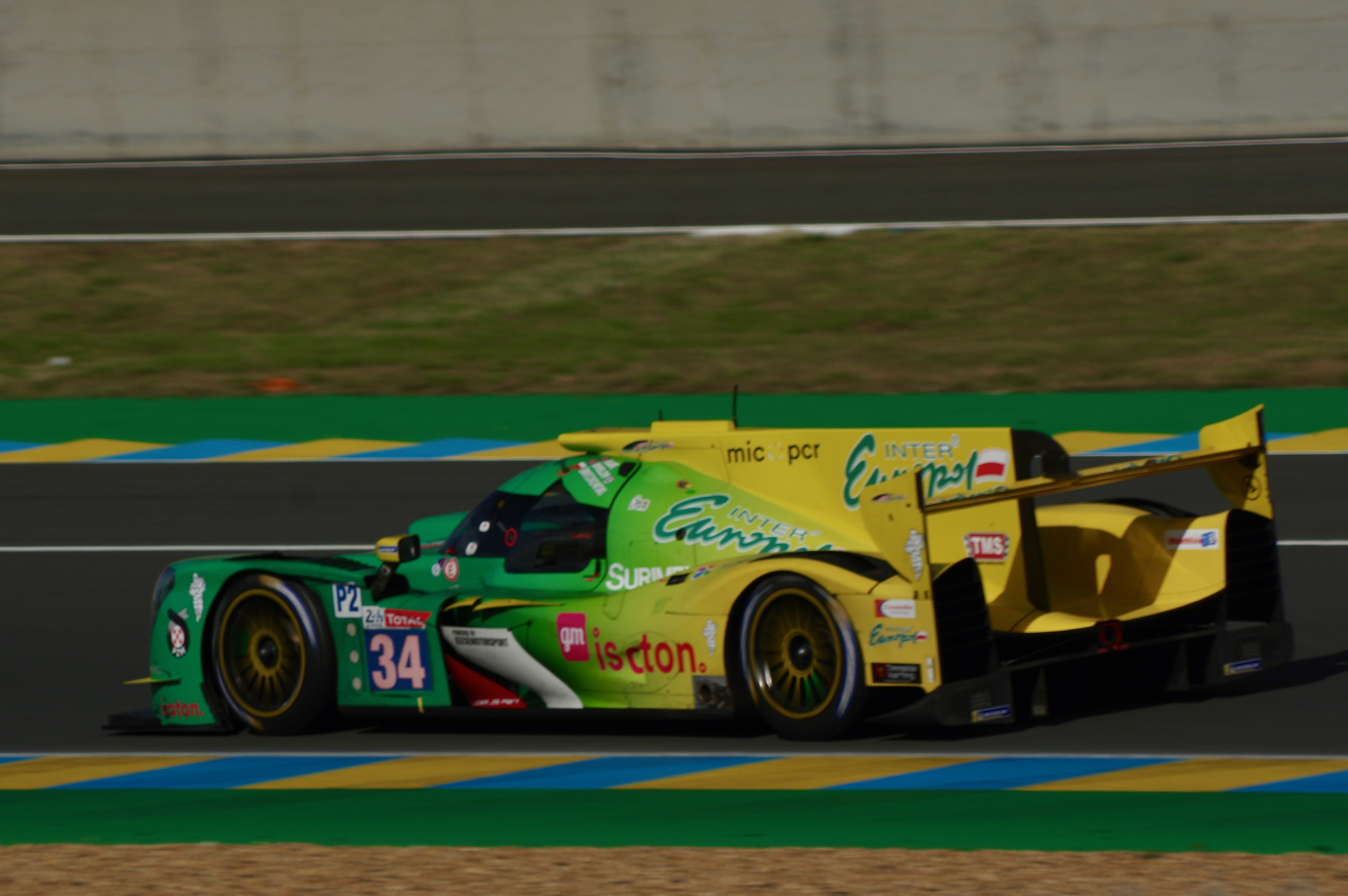
Inter Europol Competition reached the finish line of the 2019 24 Hours of Le Mans, marking the first Polish entry in the history of the race

In 2019 European Le Mans Series, the team stepped up to the LMP2 class after purchasing a Ligier JS P217 in addition to fielding two LMP3 Ligier JS P3 cars for the second consecutive year. The LMP2 campaign didn't bring good results and after frequent lineup changes Inter Europol Competition claimed 17th place in the overall classification. The effort of a car number 13 in the LMP3 class turned out to be much more fruitful with the team claiming the back-to-back 2nd place overall after a penalty in the last race of the season and rejection of the team's appeal. Car number 14 finished 12th overall.

In June, Inter Europol Competition made their debut in the 24 Hours of Le Mans race. Jakub Śmiechowski, Nigel Moore and James Winslow (who replaced Léo Roussel three weeks before the race as the effect of Roussel's back injury), driving a Ligier JS P217, recorded 45th in the race overall standings and 16th in the LMP2 class standings, after having dealt with a lot of technical issues.

In team's last season in BOSS GP, the only full-season driver Walter Steding took ninth place in the general standings.

In 2020 Inter Europol Competition again started the year with Asian Le Mans Series bid, claiming 4th with car 33 and 5th with car 34 in the LMP2 standings. The team ran also one full season entry in the LMP3 class with car 13, who finished 3rd overall, and two part season entries with cars 14 and 18.

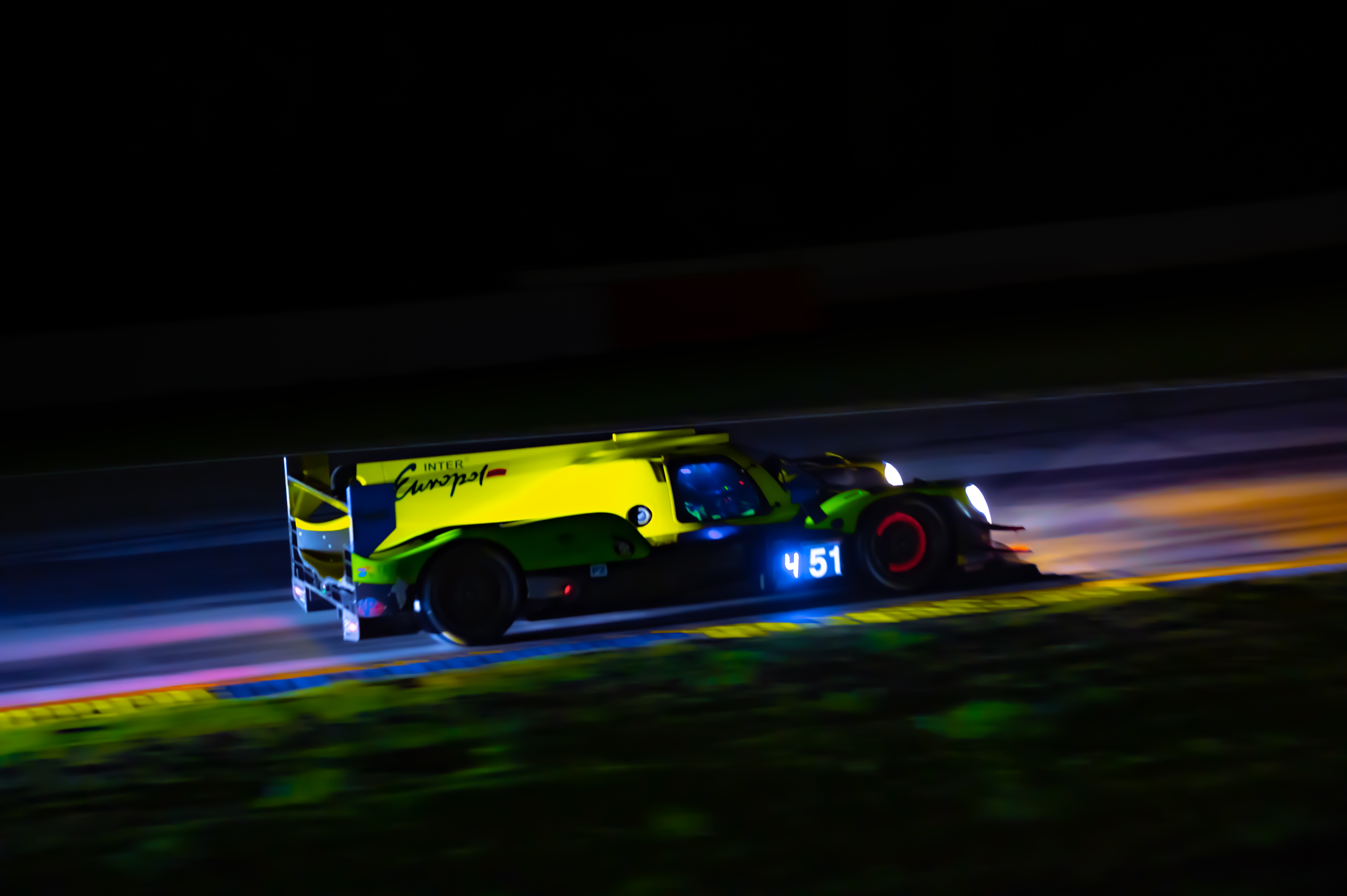
Inter Europol Competition's Oreca 07 at the 2020 Petit Le Mans

Inter Europol Competition contested the shortened European Le Mans Series season as well, with one entry in LMP2 and LMP3 classes. LMP2 #34 car, the only Ligier on the grid, saw a major lineup overhaul with Rene Binder and Matevos Isaakyan joining Jakub Śmiechowski for the ELMS and Le Mans effort. The LMP2 crew finished the season 12th overall, while Hippe, Moore and Dino Lunardi from car number 13 claimed the third consecutive ELMS LMP3 vice champion title for the Inter Europol Competition.

The team appeared on the grid of the 24 Hours of Le Mans race for the second time, struggling with technical and regulatory issues, finishing 17th in class and 45th overall.

Inter Europol Competition finished the 2020 season with two races of the IMSA SportsCar Championship, in which the team used the Oreca 07 prototype for the first time. They finished third in LMP2 class and 9th overall in the Petit Le Mans. and 4th in class and 17th overall in the 12 Hours of Sebring.

=== 2021-2023: Performing in the WEC and winning Le Mans ===
With a single Oreca 07, the team made their debut at the World Endurance Championship, moving up there for the 2021 season from European Le Mans Series. Car 34 was driven by Jakub Śmiechowski, Renger van der Zande, Alex Brundle and Louis Delétraz.

In their first season in WEC, the "Turbo Bakers" have consistently achieved results in the middle of the pack, finishing 5th in as many as four out of six races. The worst result was 9th at 6 Hours of Bahrain, after plenty of incidents. This allowed Inter Europol Competition to finish their debut season in the World Endurance Championship in 5th place.

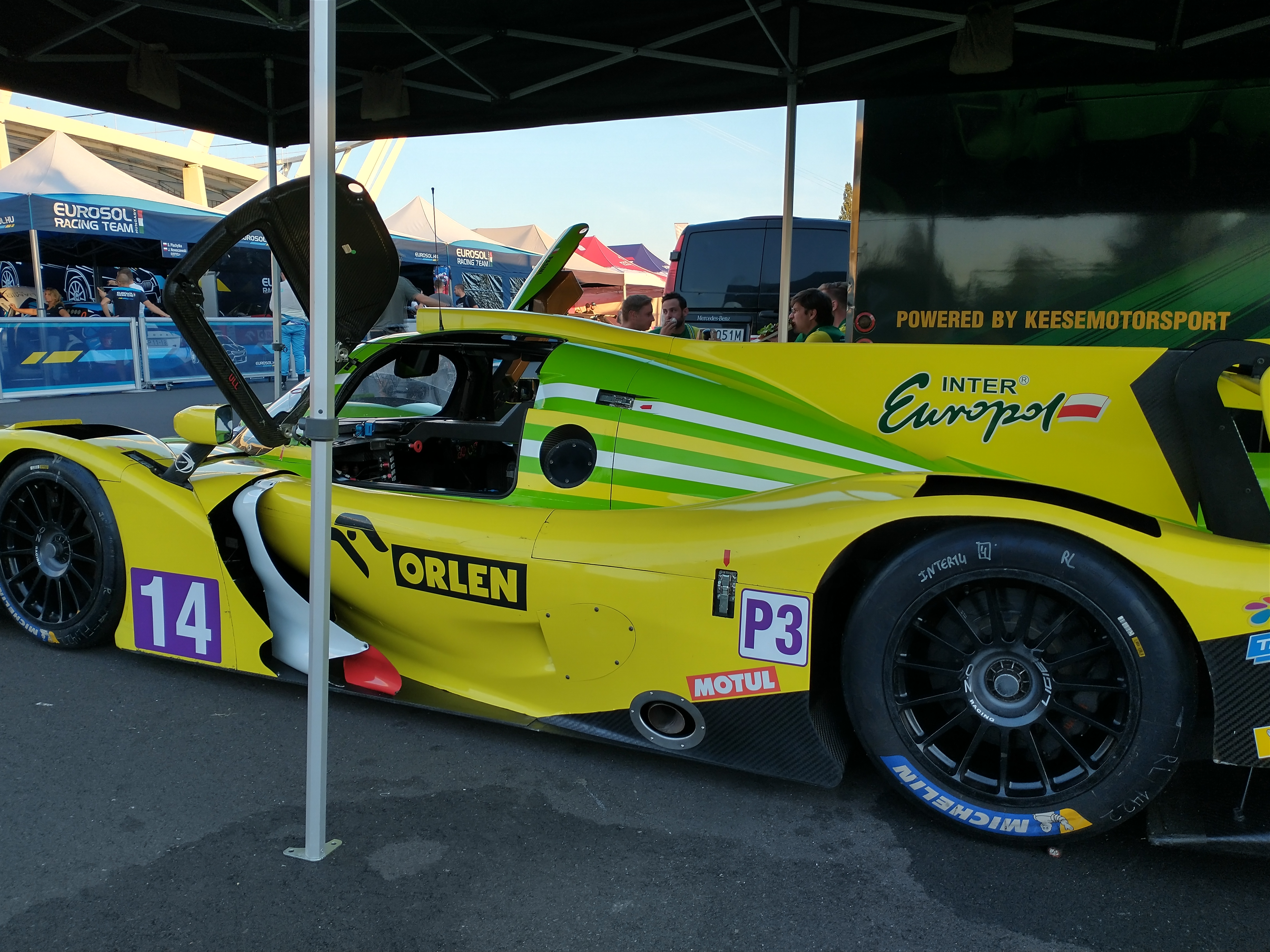
Inter Europol Competition organized a promotional event during Silesia Rally 2021, presenting their Ligier JS P320

The team's third participation in the 24 Hours of Le Mans was the most successful race to date - the team finished 5th in the LMP2 class and 10th overall. Śmiechowski, Brundle and van der Zande, driving a car number 34 avoided major mistakes and bad luck - with the exceptions of a puncture in Brundle's car, an unfaulted collision with the Racing Team India Eurasia car and problems with the refuelling machine.

The other part of Inter Europol Competition racing programme for 2021 was LMP3 class of European Le Mans Series, in which the team took part running two Ligier JS P320 machineries. Prototype number 13, as in the 2018 and 2019 seasons, recorded better results than its sister crew, scoring three podiums in total, including one win - thanks to the efforts of German Martin Hippe, who has been driving for the team since the 2016 season, young Belgian Ugo de Wilde and their changing partners. This was enough to finish fourth overall - primarily due to crashes and car's failures at Le Castellet and Spa-Francorchamps. Crew number 14 recorded results in the middle of the ELMS stakes, finishing 6th overall - the best result ever for the #14. A total of nine drivers drove a second Ligier.

The team fielded two cars in the 2022 24 Hours of Le Mans, one of them being full-season WEC entry

Inter Europol Competition began their 2022 season with a single LMP3 entry in the Asian Le Mans Series, finishing 7th despite showing a race-winning pace - after a sudden and forced change to the driver line-up, technical problems and drivers' mistakes.

For the rest of the 2022 season the team expanded their programme, which included two LMP2 entries in total - one in the World Endurance Championship and the other in the European Le Mans Series, as well as two LMP3 cars in the ELMS.

The WEC part of the 2022 season went poorly for the team. In every race, besides the 6 Hours of Monza, Inter Europol Competition was struggling with all kinds of problems - drivers' mistakes, technical problems, and sheer lack of pace, which resulted in scoring 20 points and placing 11th in the general standings.

The story of poor results continued in the 2022 24 Hours of Le Mans; IEC cars crossed the finish line in 13th (number 34) and 14th (number 43) place in class. The WEC car struggled with maximum speed, and other lesser issues. Car number 43 (loaned from the DragonSpeed team, as Oreca due to worldwide supply chain issues was not able to deliver the purchased car on time) has been swinging in the latter half of the top ten of the ranks until early morning, when the ignition coil failure forced David Heinemeier Hansson to come to the pits for repairs. The main reasons for the team's poor performance were the sudden departure of team's technical director, the need to restructure the team and significant turnover among the staff.

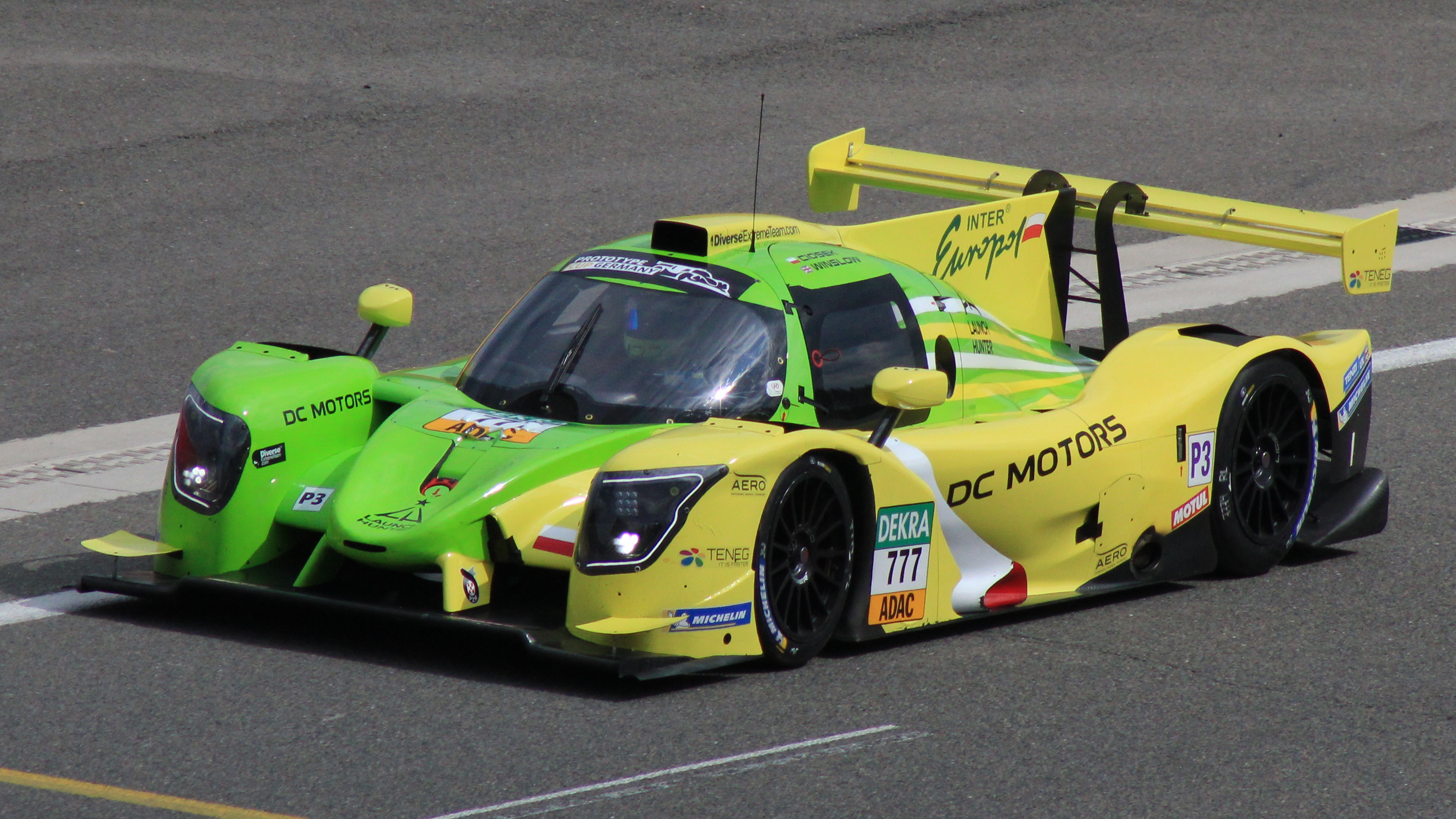
A guest start in the new Prototype Cup Germany series resulted in a 2nd place for the team

ELMS performances were uneven. The LMP2 car came alive in the second part of the season, which was a sign of things to come in 2023 and subsequent seasons, including scoring team's first ever LMP2 podium, placing 2nd at Spa-Francorchamps after starting from the bottom of the pile, and 4th in the season finale at Portimao, finishing the year in 8th place. Dramatic was the LMP3 season, which started with car's disqualification, taking three wins in a row at Monza, Circuit de Catalunya and Spa-Francorchamps and finally losing the championship an hour before the finish of the 4 Hours of Portimao - as a result of a collision between Nico Pino and Mathias Beche and the resulting suspension damage. The damage, originally resulting in a significant pace drop, soon proved to be terminal and eliminated the car from the race 12 minutes before the end of the season. Car No. 14, meanwhile, finished last, 13th overall, mainly as a result of slow runs and numerous mistakes by James Dayson.

The last part of the team's 2022 effort was a guest start in the new Prototype Cup Germany series - with a single LMP3 car, driven by James Winslow, returning to the team, and Damian Ciosek. They have finished 6th and 2nd during the weekend at Spa-Francorchamps.

In the 2023 season Inter Europol Competition contested the 24 Hours of Le Mans, FIA World Endurance Championship, European Le Mans Series, Asian Le Mans Series and Le Mans Cup with respectively two, one, two, four and three entries.

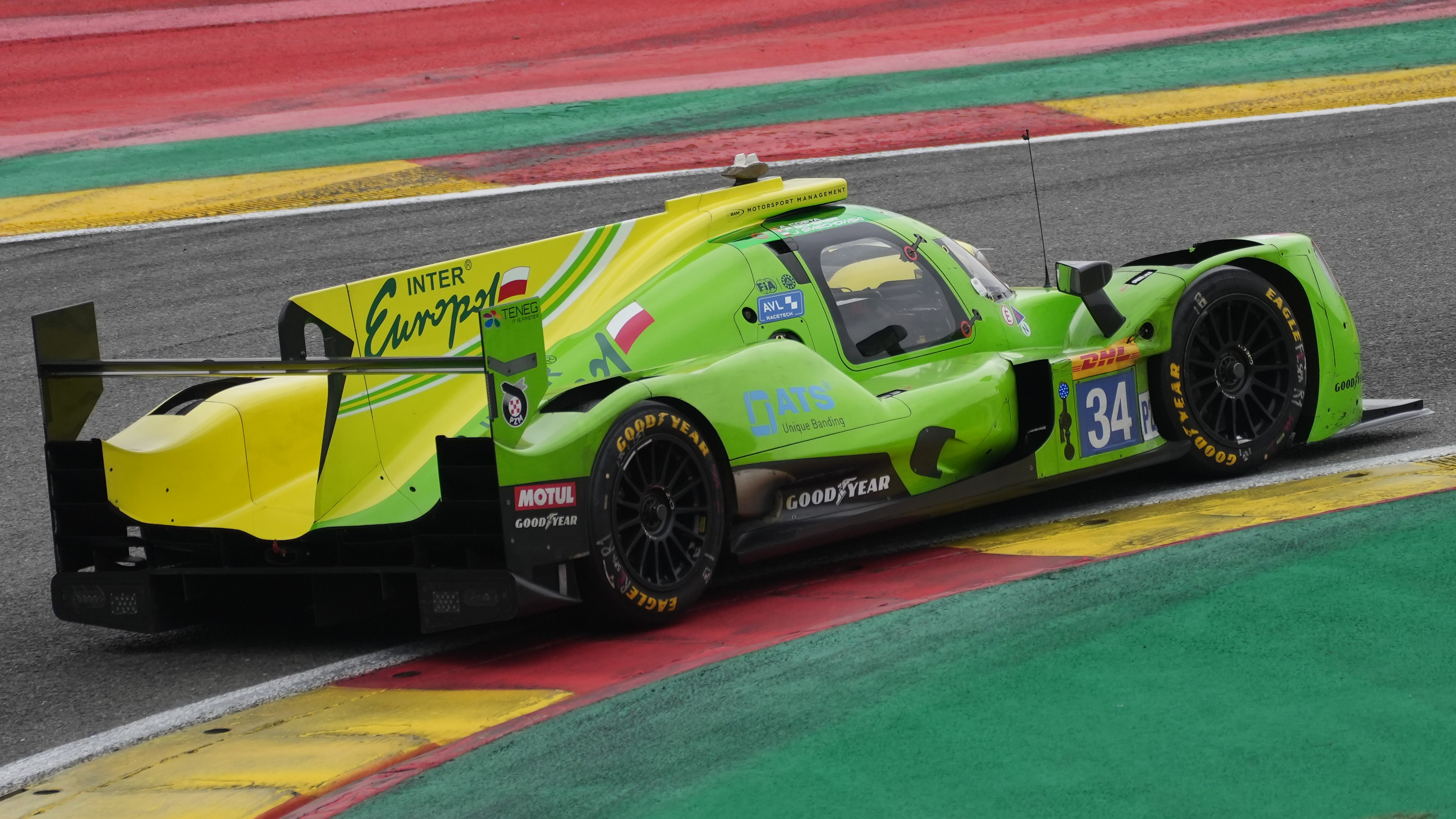
The team recorded their first WEC podium during 2023 6 Hours of Spa-Francorchamps

The season started with a four car effort in Asian Le Mans Series. LMP2 car was very quick throughout the whole season, with pace of Nolan Siegel being one of the most important factors. However, two mechanical failures in last minutes of the first and last races, with Siegel respectively in P3 and P1, stripped the team from the championship. LMP3 crews finished 7th, 12th and 15th (last) in the general standings.

The World Endurance Championship season was finished by Jakub Śmiechowski, Albert Costa and Fabio Scherer as runner-ups with 114 points scored. This was how the team ended their three-year stint in the WEC, following the removal of the LMP2 class from the series (with the exception of the 24 Hours of Le Mans).

The high point of the season and team's highest point to date was victory at the 2023 24 Hours of Le Mans. The team again fielded two cars - a regular car competing in the WEC and a car numbered 32, crewed by Jan Magnussen, Anders Fjordbach and amateur driver Mark Kvamme (the crew started in the Pro-am subclass). The crew of the second car ended its participation in the race during the night after Magnussen's accident.

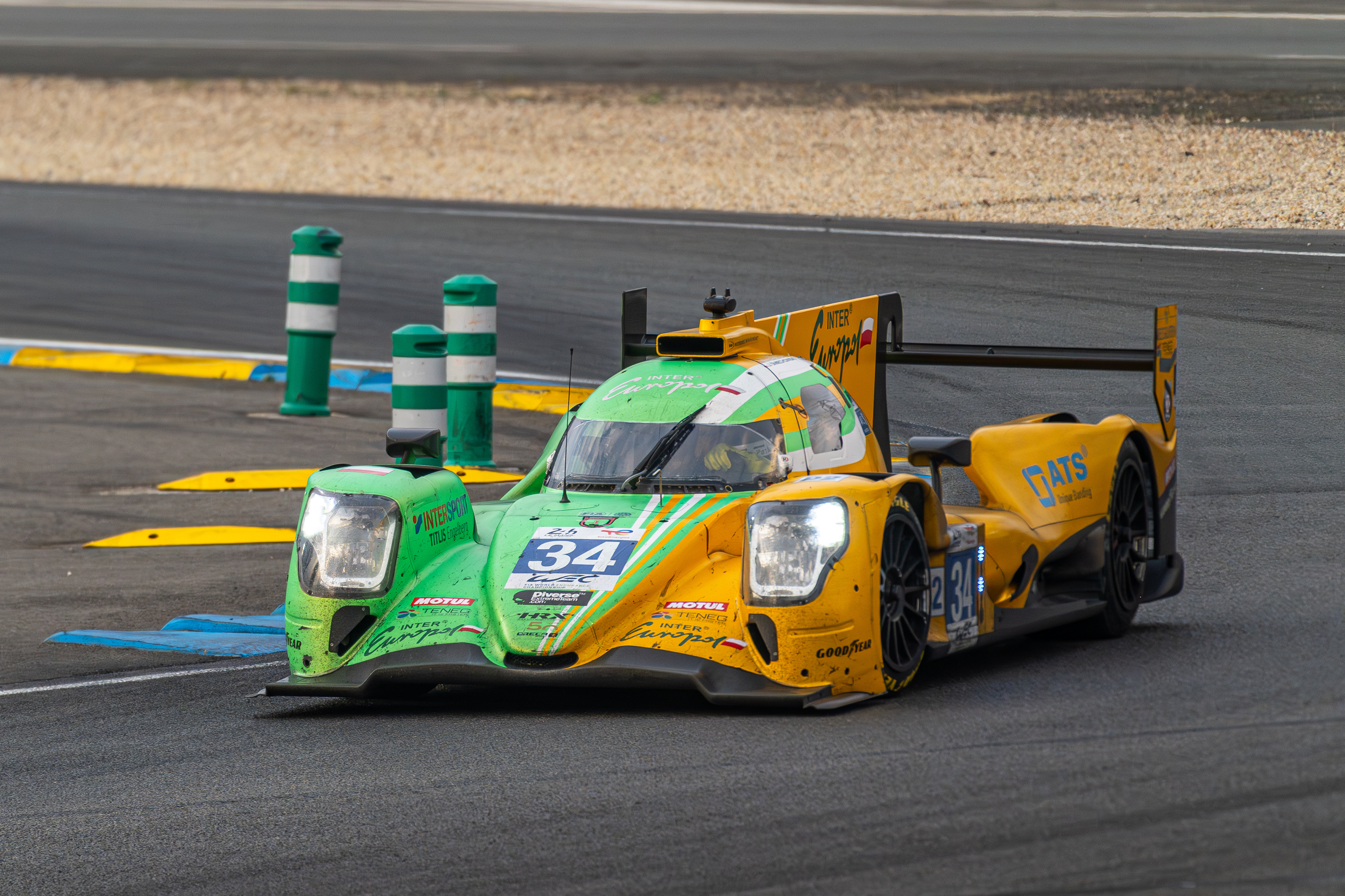
Inter Europol Competition on their way to win the 2023 24 Hours of Le Mans

Śmiechowski, Scherer and Costa showed pace which second-place finisher Robert Kubica described as "in a league of its own" and avoided mistakes other than Costa's minor exit in a gravel trap in the Mulsanne's corner in the final hours of the race and a safety car infringement, for which the team had to serve a drive-through penalty. Widely recognized was Scherer's drive, who was hit in the leg by a Corvette Racing machinery when exiting the car in the first hour of the race and suffered ligament and heel damage and an incomplete fracture to his mid-left foot with three bones broken. After being cared for by the team's physiotherapists the Swiss spent more than eight hours behind the wheel of the Oreca 07, having to change his braking method and limping on one leg when entering and exiting the car. Scherer also had to deal with a radio malfunction at the end of the race. A big improvement was made by Jakub Śmiechowski, who showed the pace of a quality silver-category driver and Albert Costa was the team's fastest driver.

After the race, the team's rivals, notably the driver of the second-placed car at the finish, Louis Delétraz, accused the team of breaching the technical regulations, citing short refuelling times, low fuel consumption and high acceleration of the car. After a procedure that lasted more than a month, the race organisers confirmed the results on the basis of a report from the FIA and ACO technical delegates, who 'after deep analysis' found all cars - including the Polish team's Oreca - in compliance with their respective regulations.

The ELMS season was not successful for the IEC. In the LMP2 class, a gearbox failure in the first race proved to be the harbinger of the whole season, during which car #43 scored just one podium in the seven-team field. The drivers showed mostly average pace as well as kept making mistakes. At Aragon they had to withdraw from the race after an unfaulted crash. The team showed from a better side in the LMP3 class, whose season ended in fourth place overall with two second places. The drivers of a Ligier JS P320 were not lucky either – not finishing two races, at Aragon and Algarve, was due to car breakdowns.

The team's debut season in the Le Mans Cup saw all three crews finish in last places in the overall standings. The best and most consistent performances came from the drivers of the number 15 car, Bryson Morris and Chris Short, while Santiago Concepción Serrano and Ben Stone of the number 13 Ligier failed to finish as many as five out of the seven races of the season.

=== 2024-: At the front of LMP2 ===
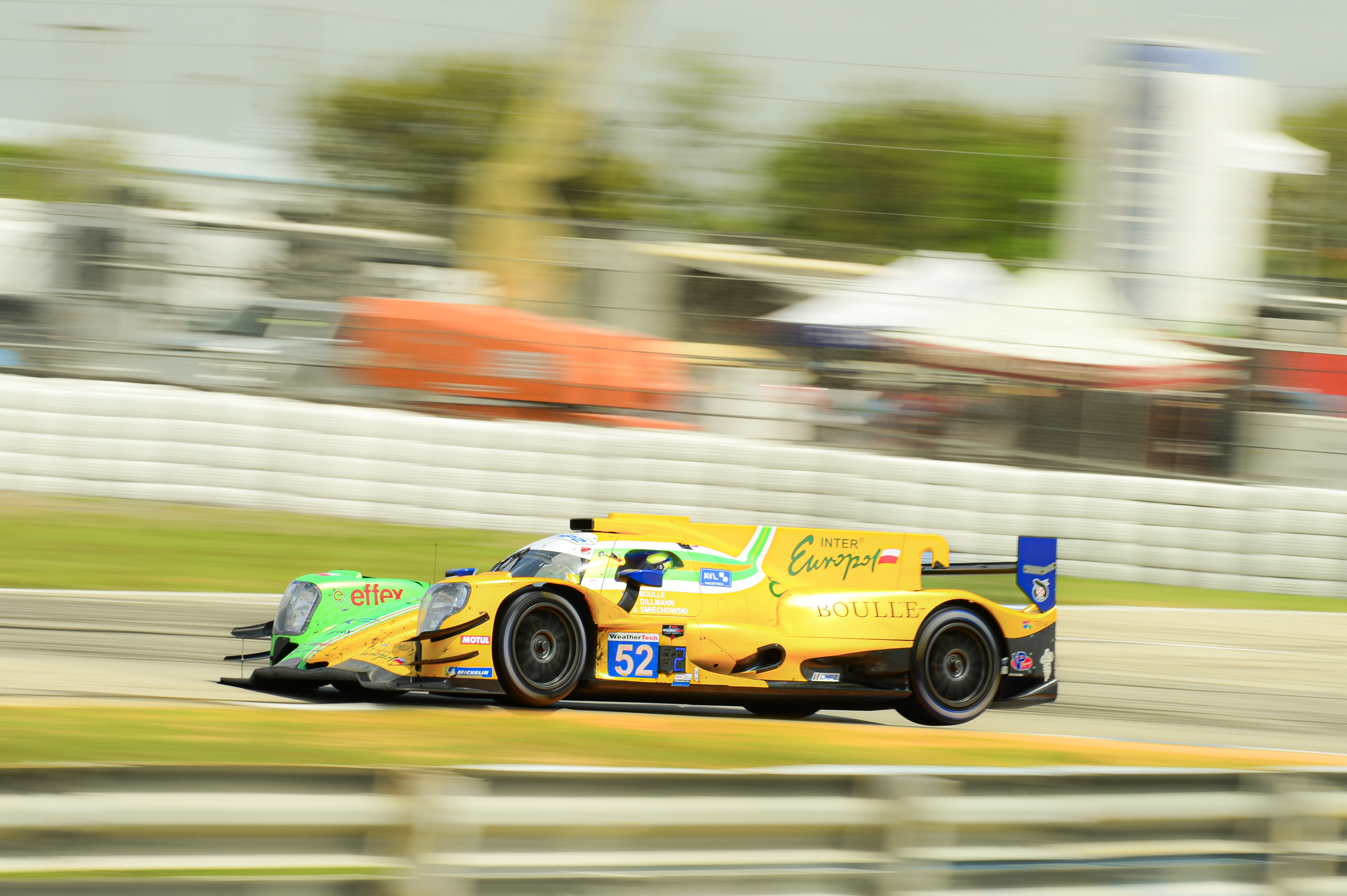
Inter Europol Competition, in a cooperation with the American team PR1/Mathiasen, won the IMSA Sportscar Championship in their debut year

The team's programme for the 2024 season included 24 Hours of Le Mans - with one LMP2 car, European Le Mans Series - with two LMP2s and one LMP3, Le Mans Cup - with two cars in the LMP3 class and the IMSA SportsCar Championship with one entry in the LMP2 class. As a result of the withdrawal of the LMP2 class from the FIA WEC, the team's only start in this series was the race at Le Mans. Inter Europol also entered its cars in the less prestigious series - a Ligier JS P4 in the Ligier European Series and the Ligier JS P320 in the Ultimate Cup.

In the IMSA series the team's management decided to partner with the American PR1/Mathiasen Motorsports team, due to lack of familiarity with the specifics of car racing in the USA and logistical issues. The day-to-day running of the car in the 2024 season was left to PR1, while the engineers working on it came from both teams. The selection of drivers – including American jewellery company owner Nick Boulle, Tom Dillmann and Jakub Śmiechowski - was down to the team from Poland. The American outings of the team brought them IMSA LMP2 champions title in the debut year. Victory at Canadian Tire Motorsport Park, podiums at Watkins Glen and Indianapolis and overall consistent performance from Inter Europol by PR1/Mathiasen, with 7th at Road America being the worst result of the season, not only brought the Polish-American project the champions’ crown, but also an invitation for team’s bronze driver Nick Boulle to 2025 24 Hours of Le Mans – with Boulle choosing Inter Europol Competition as his team for the race.

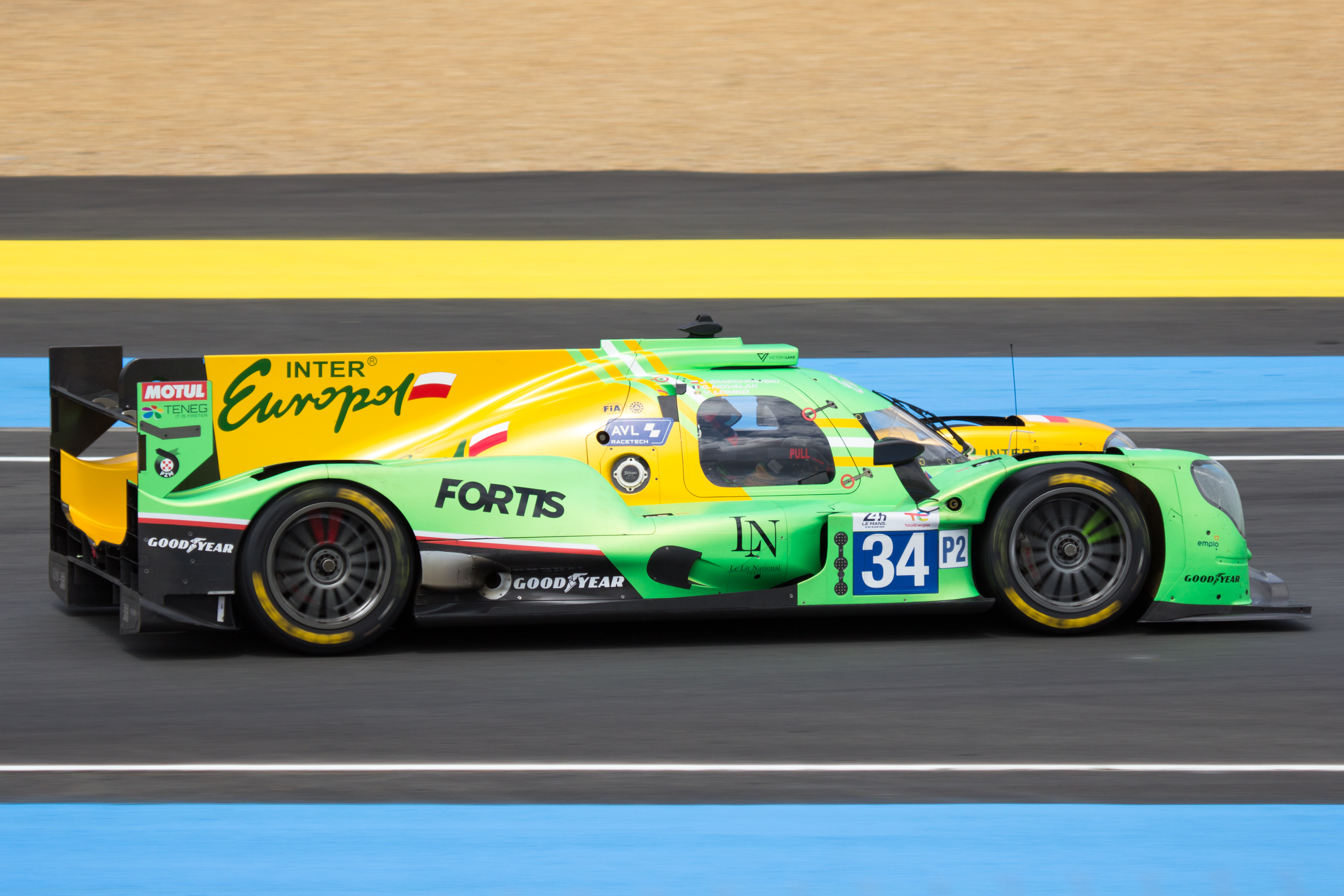
Inter Europol Competition was the runner up of the 2024 24 Hours of Le Mans

In the 92nd edition of the 24 Hours of Le Mans, the team came very close to defending last year's victory. Śmiechowski, Vladislav Lomko and Clement Novalak finished second, 18 seconds behind the winners from United Autosports. In the fourth hour of the race Novalak lost his left front wheel and returned to the pits on three wheels, soon making another enforced stop to change the front of the car. Eventually the Frenchman brought the car to the finish in second position, remaining in the top five for the last hours of the race.

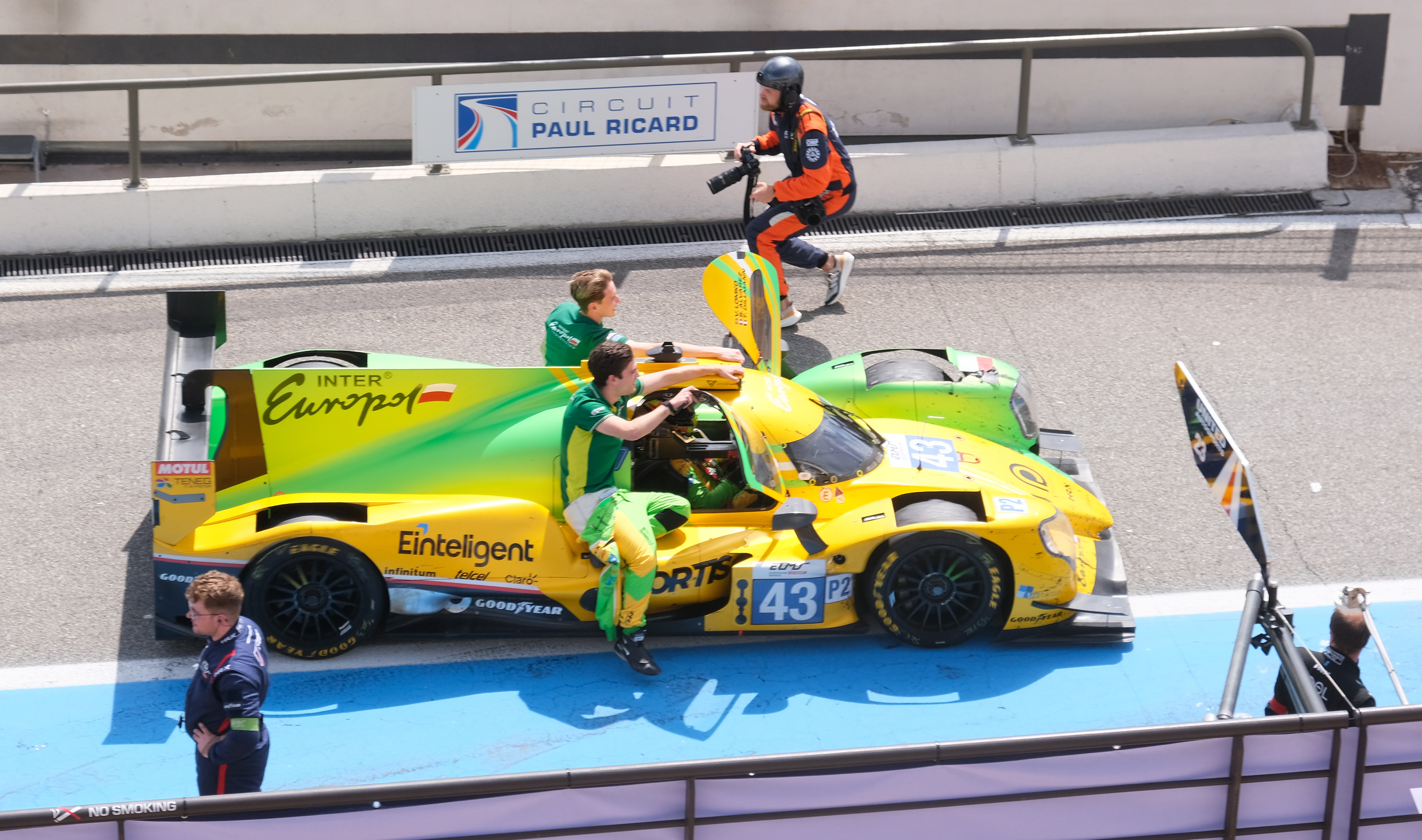
Alvarez, Dillmann and Lomko won the 4h of Le Castellet, team's first victory in the ELMS. The only victory of the season resulted in 2nd place in the overall classification

The ELMS part of the 2024 season also went well for the team. At Circuit Paul Ricard team achieved their first win in the LMP2 class of the series, after a dramatic race and missing on 1-2 result just before the finish. This victory was the only one of the season, but just as in IMSA consistency (7th similarly being worst result) was the deciding factor on the way to second position in overall classification for the informal captain of the #43 car Dillmann, as well as Lomko and Sebastián Álvarez. The crew finished the final race of the season in Portimao in fourth place, after confusion over serving a later revoked penalty. Driving the No. 34 Oreca 07, Luca Ghiotto, Oliver Gray and Novalak placed seventh overall, scoring a single podium in Mugello. The LMP3 car just as #34 scored a single podium in the campaign, which was enough only for 9th, next-to-last, place overall.

The second season in the Le Mans Cup series ended with better results than the first. Alexander Bukhantsov and Rik Koen from the #34 Ligier ended the season in 11th place overall, scoring a single podium place, while Timothy Creswick, Sebastian Gravlund and Daniel Ali generally presented a weaker pace and finished the season in 19th place.

In 2025 Inter Europol Competition again took part in IMSA SportsCar Championship with a single LMP2 car, numbered 43 - with a standalone effort, managed from a new base established in the United States. Team took also part in the Asian Le Mans Series with two LMP3 cars. Finally, Inter Europol returned to the European Le Mans Series and Le Mans Cup.

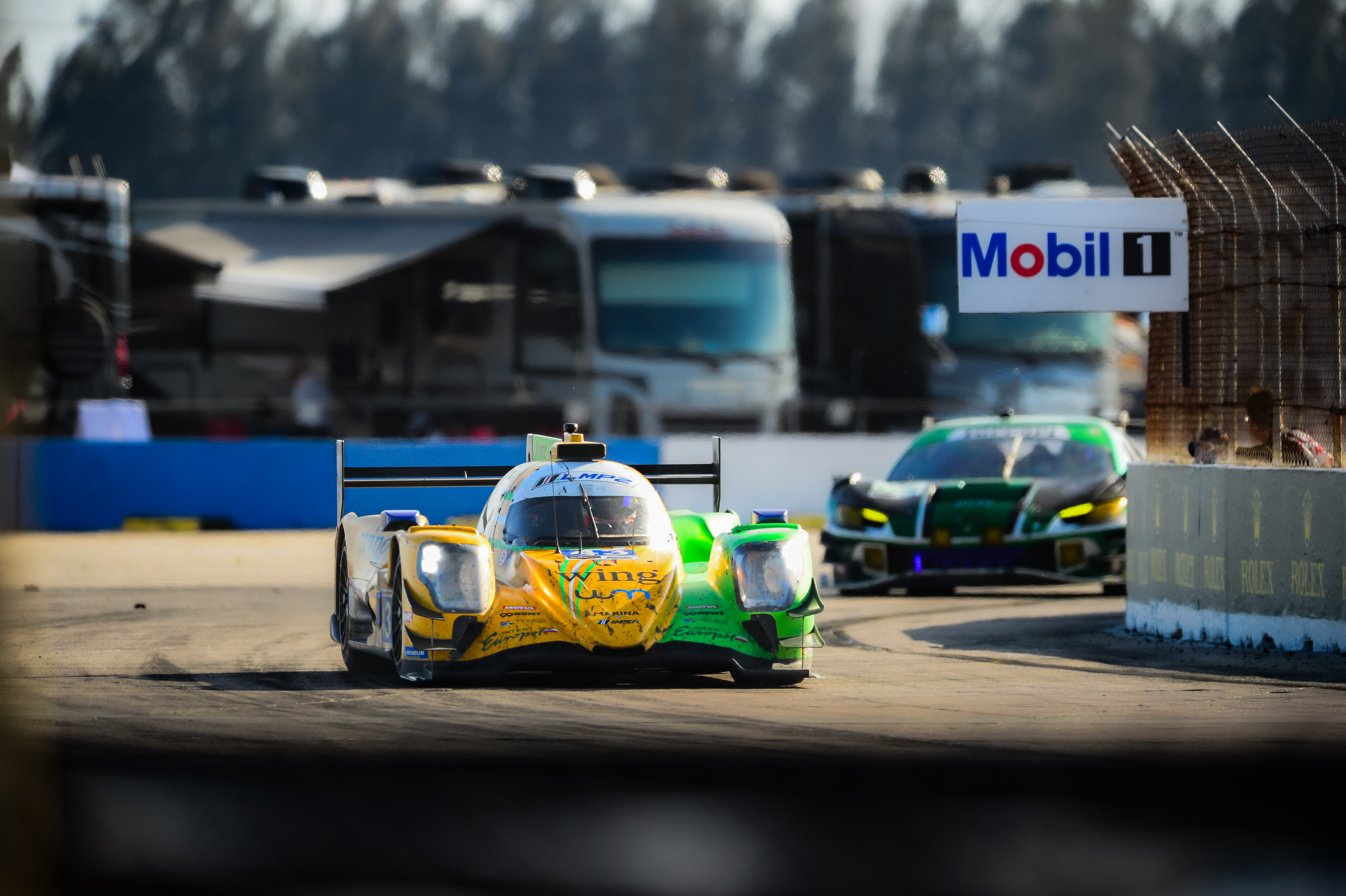
Inter Europol Competition took the victory in the 2025 12 Hours of Sebring

The year began with entries in the Asian Le Mans Series with two Ligier JS P320 LMP3 cars, numbered 34 and 43, which were the last appearances for these cars, as they were later replaced by the new generation JS P325 models. In a total of twelve starts, the team scored one podium finish, which earned both cars last places in the overall standings.

The team finished its first independent season in the IMSA Sportscar Championship in third place overall, achieved after winning the 12 Hours of Sebring in the final minutes of the race, three second places, and low finishes in the remaining three races due to technical problems. A suspension failure late in the race at Canadian Tires Motorsport Park, while Tom Dillmann was leading the race, resulted in a serious accident, causing Dillmann to undergo surgery on his injured spine and miss the race at Road America, where he was replaced by BMW driver Connor De Phillippi.

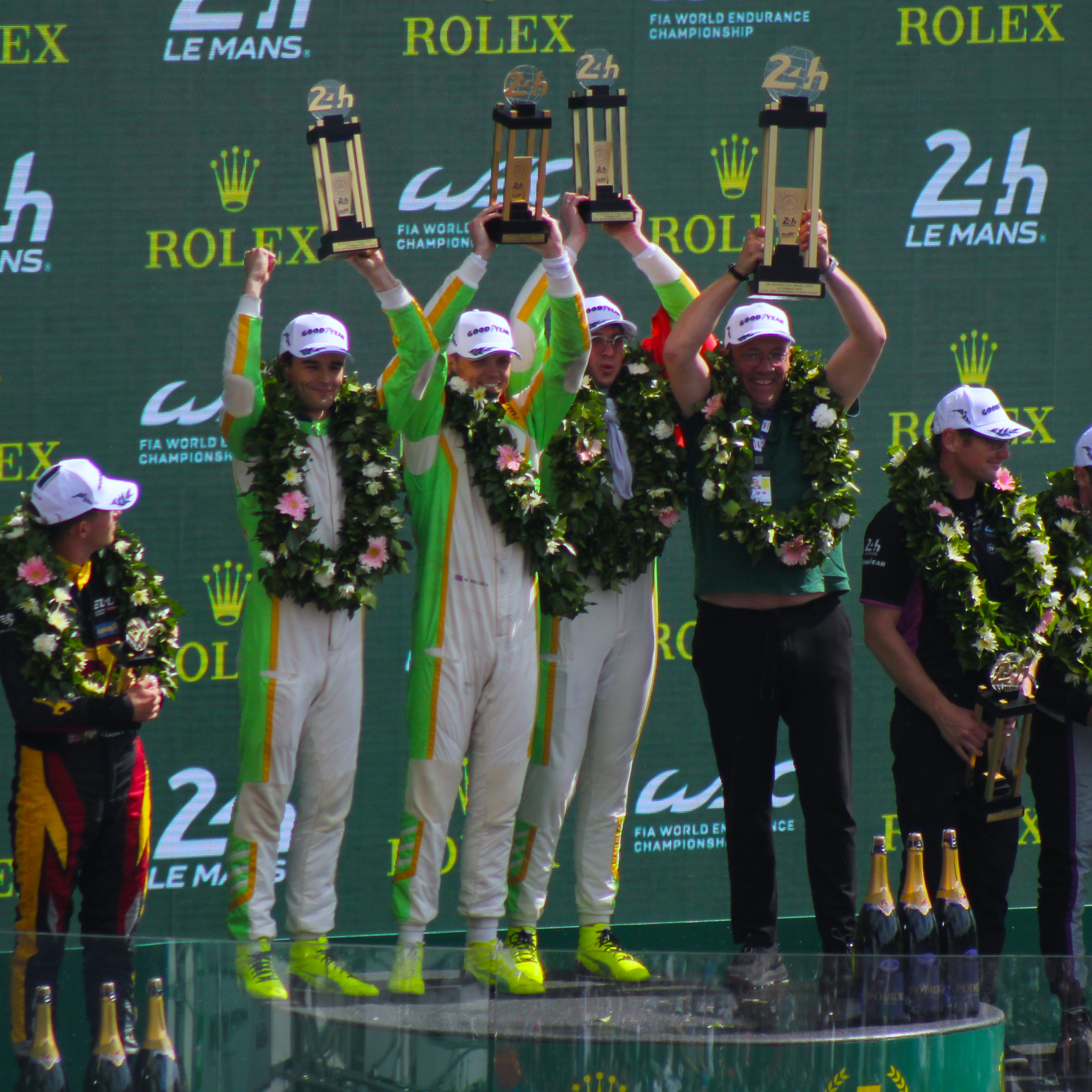
The team took their second 24 Hours of Le Mans victory after a race-long battle with VDS Panis Racing

With two official invitations received - one for Nick Boulle for winning the IMSA Jim Trueman Award and another for the team for placing 2nd overall in 2024 ELMS - the team also raced at the 24h Le Mans. Śmiechowski, Dillmann and new team driver Nick Yelloly scored Inter Europol's second win and third podium of the race. The number 43 car led the race from the morning, maintaining a lead of no more than twenty seconds over the number 48 car of the VDS Panis Racing team. The last hour of the race had a dramatic twist; 34 minutes before the finish, the team was given a drive-through penalty as a result of Yelloly's speeding in the pit lane during the previous stop. Subsequently lost lead was regained after another few minutes due to a suspension failure in the rivals' car. Yelloly finished the race with a lead of nearly two minutes over Panis team.

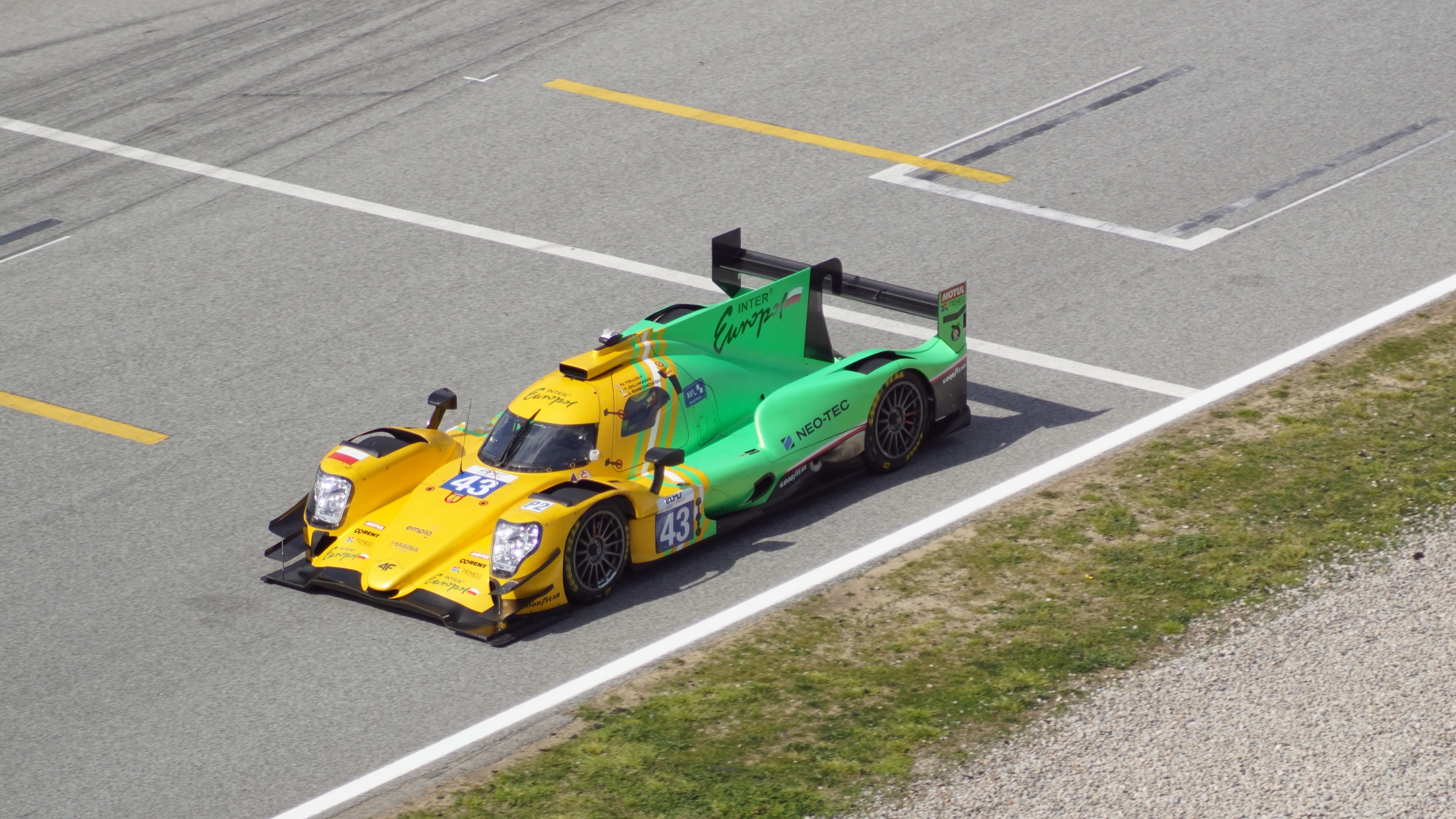
Five second place finishes in the 2025 ELMS season resulted in second place in the overall standings

The battle with VDS Panis Racing continued throughout the year in the ELMS series, where it ended with a victory for the French team. Five second places in a total of six races earned Śmiechowski, Dillmann, and Yelloly second place in the overall series standings. Driving car #34, Pedro Perino, Luca Ghiotto, and Jean-Baptiste Simmenauer finished the season in tenth place overall, with fifth place at Spa-Francorchamps as their best result of the season. After a two-year break, the team returned to the podium in the LMP3 overall standings after two podium finishes and scoring points in every race. The #88 Ligier JS P325 was driven by Timothy Creswick, Reece Gold, and Douwe Dedecker.

Another season of Le Mans Cup racing was marked by numerous driver and class changes. The best result in the overall standings was 6th place for car number 34 in the LMP3 Pro-am class, which was driven by four different crews during the year, achieving one podium finish in the race at Spa-Francorchamps; the victory in the last race of the season was lost due to a regulatory error.

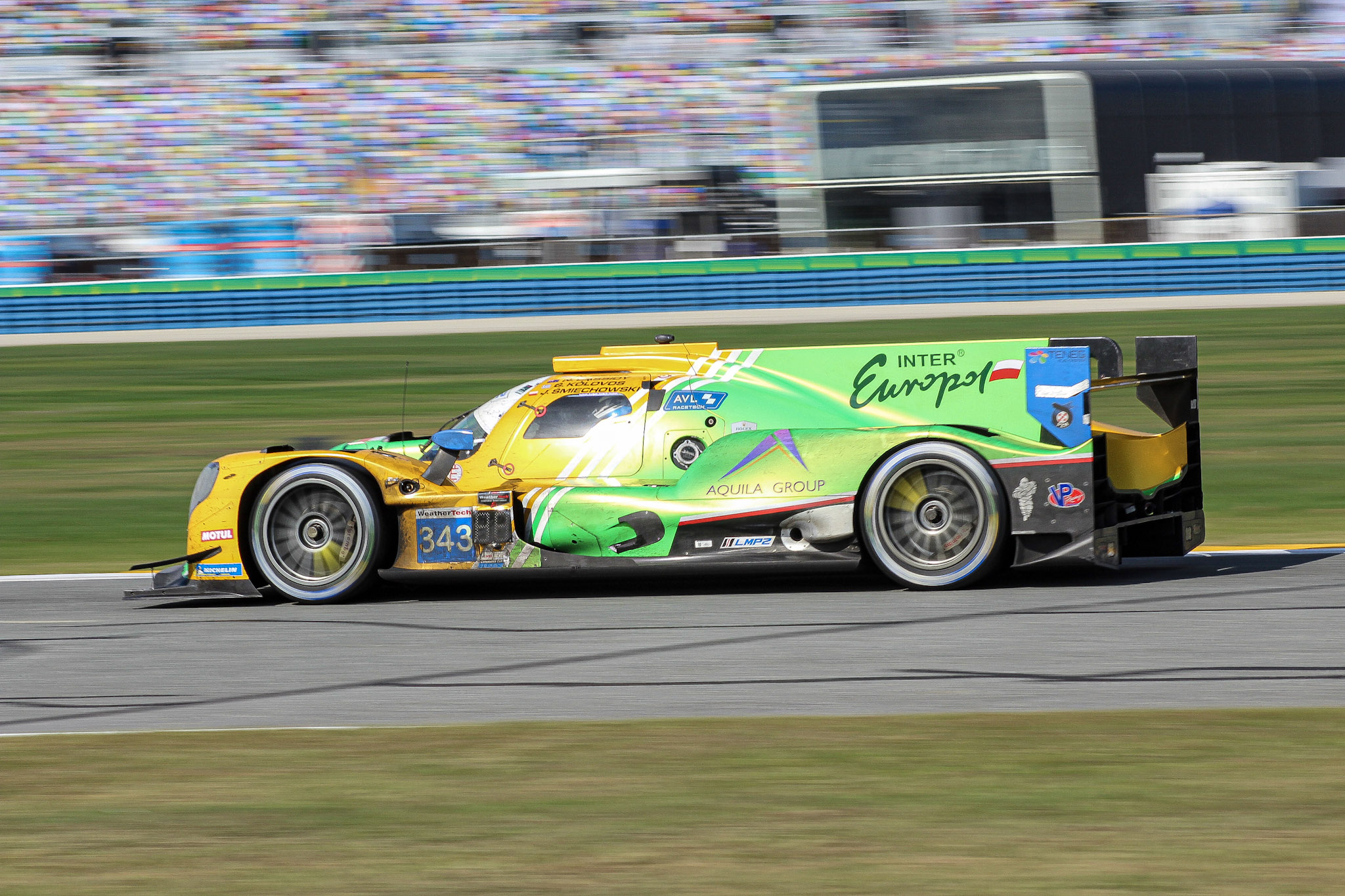
2026 24 Hours of Daytona ended with a double podium for Inter Europol, including a third place of the one-off entry #343

In the season of 2026 the team competed in the same series and classes as in the previous year and two years earlier - 24 Hours of Le Mans, IMSA SportsCar Championship, European Le Mans Series, Asian Le Mans Series and Le Mans Cup. The year started with a double entry in the 24 Hours of Daytona, which brought the team their first double podium in the LMP2 class. The full-season car number 43, driven by returning for another year Tom Dillmann, Jeremy Clarke, Bijoy Garg and António Félix da Costa finished second, while the one-off entry of a car #343 in the hands of Śmiechowski, Nick Cassidy, returning to the team after three years Nolan Siegel and Georgios Kolovos took the lowest step of the podium. After finishing first in the overall standings in the 2024 season and third in the 2025 season, the #43 team ended the season of 2026 as series runners-up, missing the championship title by less than a second, following a year-long battle with the Crowdstrike by APR team, in which both teams were the only ones in the series to win two races each.

In the Asian Le Mans Series, both teams – LMP2 #43 and LMP3 #13 – had very different seasons. One second place in the LMP2 class earned the team 11th place in the overall standings. In the LMP3 class, the team came very close to winning the championship again after seven years, with two wins and one second place, with a car being driven by returning to the team after a year's hiatus Alexander Bukhantsov and two new drivers, Chun-Ting Chou and Henry Cubides Olarte. The car with number 13 ultimately won the series runner-up title, having lost the championship as the result of the disqualification from the first race in Abu Dhabi due to a technical infringement.

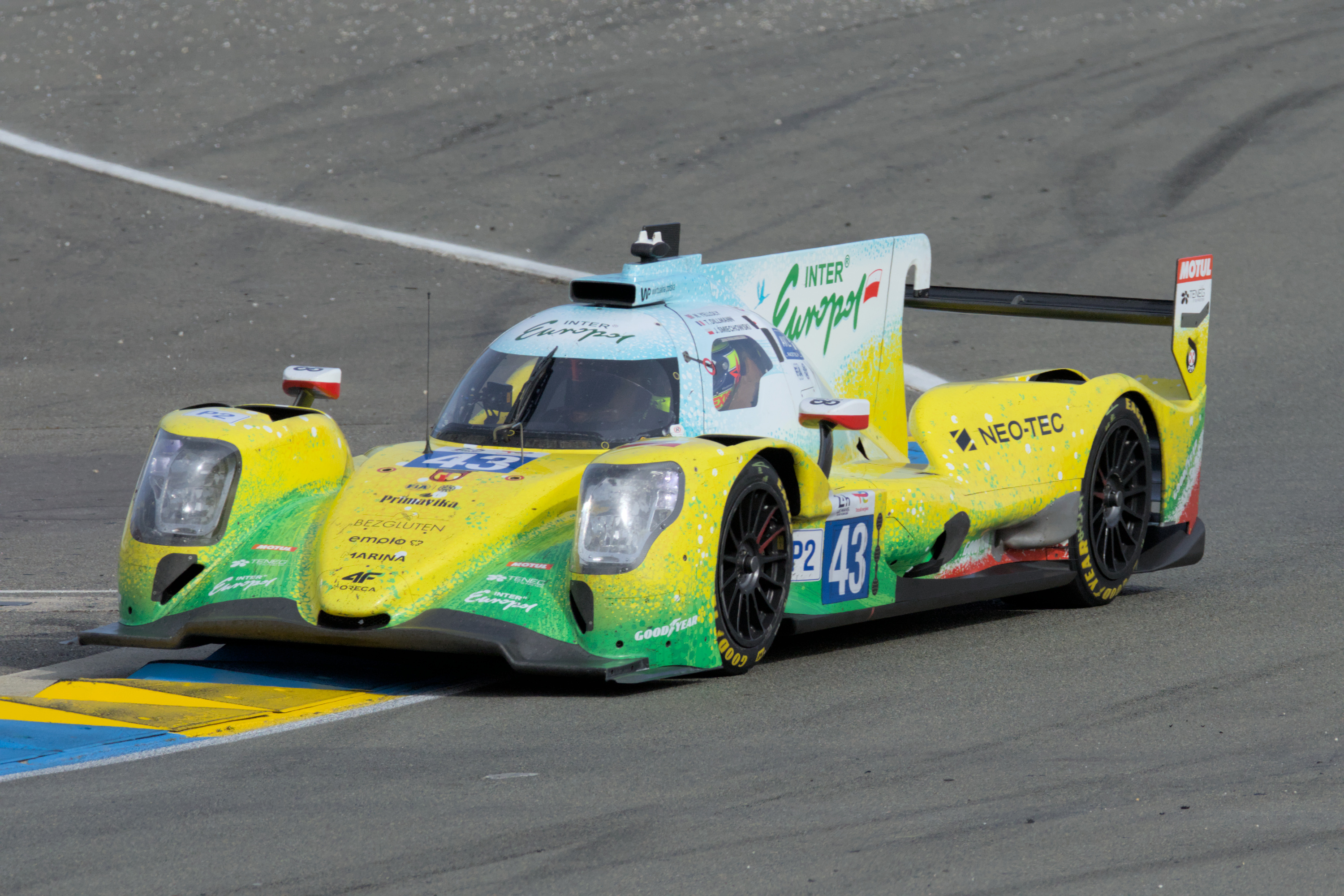
Inter Europol Competition took the 1-2 result in the 2026 edition of the 24 Hours of Le Mans, including a #43 car defending their 2025 victory

The team returned to the 24 hours of Le Mans with two cars. Car number 43, spotting a special livery inspired by Polish rapeseed fields, was again driven by Dillmann, Śmiechowski and Yelloly, while for the #343 the team hired the duo of Bijoy Garg and Reshad de Gerus driving for the team in the ELMS, as well as a Porsche factory driver Nico Müller. The race ended with #43 successfully defending their 2025 victory and #343 finishing second. The main rivals of the team were the long-leading number 30 car of the Duqueine team, which had to retire from the race in its 21st hour due to a brake disc failure and, again, Forestier Racing by Panis. Dillmann, Śmiechowski and Yelloly utilized a slightly different tyre strategy than a sister car, which was in part due to both cars running close to each other in the last hours of the race, as well as saved fuel for most of the race.

All three crews, including #13 LMP3 car, finished in the middle of the overall standings in the 2026 European Le Mans Series

The ELMS series was the weakest point of Inter Europol Competition’s 2026 campaign. The 4 Hours of Imola was the only race of the season that did not yield a podium finish for any of the crews, but all three finished the season in the middle of the pack in their respective classes, with car #43’s fifth-place finish and 59 points marking the best result.

The Le Mans Cup season was marked by 5 pole positions of the #34 LMP3 Pro-am car in six races, achieved due to Bukhantsov's efforts, which were not converted to any victory, resulting in 5th place overall for him and his changing partners. The #43 LMP3 entry scored points only once and was withdrawn from the series before its finale.

=== Hypercar and next generation LMP2 plans ===
Inter Europol Competition has been planning to compete in the top class of endurance racing since 2021. Until 2026, team management repeatedly pointed to the significant costs of fielding a top class prototype in the WEC or IMSA series and the need to secure appropriate manufacturer support. In January 2026, industry media reported that the team would field at least one car in the Hypercar class of the WEC as early as the 2027 season in collaboration with Honda. In June 2026 team director Sascha Fassbender stated that the deal fell apart right before completing it due to the Honda decision. In May 2026, according to media reports, the team was still in talks regarding competing in the top class of the endurance racing, including discussions with potential drivers; Fassbender, however, claimed that the Hypercar or GTP move before the season of 2028 is unlikely and again confirmed that team's plan involves only operating the factory effort and not a privateer one.

Independently, in the season of 2028 the team will field entries in the next-generation LMP2 class - switching to the Ligier JS P228 model, making their return to the Ligier LMP2 collaboration after 7 years of using Oreca 07.

== Racing record ==
=== 24 Hours of Le Mans ===
Year	Entrant	No.	Car	Drivers	Class	Laps	Pos.	Class Pos.
2019	(Poland) Inter Europol Competition	34	Ligier JS P217-Gibson	(United Kingdom) Nigel Moore (Poland) Jakub Śmiechowski (United Kingdom) James Winslow	LMP2	325	45th	16th
2020	(Poland) Inter Europol Competition	34	Ligier JS P217-Gibson	(Austria) René Binder (Russia) Matevos Isaakyan (Poland) Jakub Śmiechowski	LMP2	316 (Note: The No. 34 Ligier was penalised 9 laps and 56 seconds for René Binder failing to meet the minimum overall drive time of six hours. The penalty demoted the car one position.)	42nd	17th
2021	(Poland) Inter Europol Competition	34	Oreca 07-Gibson	(United Kingdom) Alex Brundle (Poland) Jakub Śmiechowski (Netherlands) Renger van der Zande	LMP2	360	10th	5th
2022	(Poland) Inter Europol Competition	34	Oreca 07-Gibson	(United Kingdom) Alex Brundle (Mexico) Esteban Gutiérrez (Poland) Jakub Śmiechowski	LMP2	365	17th	13th
2022	(Poland) Inter Europol Competition	43	Oreca 07-Gibson	(Brazil) Pietro Fittipaldi (Denmark) David Heinemeier Hansson (Switzerland) Fabio Scherer	LMP2	364	18th	14th
2023	(Poland) Inter Europol Competition	32	Oreca 07-Gibson	(Denmark) Anders Fjordbach (United States) Mark Kvamme (Denmark) Jan Magnussen	LMP2 (Pro-Am)	117	DNF	DNF
2023	(Poland) Inter Europol Competition	34	Oreca 07-Gibson	(Spain) Albert Costa (Switzerland) Fabio Scherer (Poland) Jakub Śmiechowski	LMP2	328	9th	1st
2024	(Poland) Inter Europol Competition	34	Oreca 07-Gibson	(Grenada) Vladislav Lomko (Note: Lomko and Bukhantsov are Russian, but they compete under foreign or neutral licences as Russian national emblems were banned by the FIA following the Russian invasion of Ukraine. Bukhantsov uses Emirati and Kittitian licences, while Lomko has held French and Grenadian licences.) (France) Clément Novalak (Poland) Jakub Śmiechowski	LMP2	297	16th	2nd
2025	(Poland) Inter Europol Competition	34	Oreca 07-Gibson	(United States) Nick Boulle (Italy) Luca Ghiotto (France) Jean-Baptiste Simmenauer	LMP2 (Pro-Am)	363	27th	5th
2025	(Poland) Inter Europol Competition	43	Oreca 07-Gibson	(France) Tom Dillmann (Poland) Jakub Śmiechowski (United Kingdom) Nick Yelloly	LMP2	367	18th	1st
2026	(Poland) Inter Europol Competition	43	Oreca 07-Gibson	(France) Tom Dillmann (Poland) Jakub Śmiechowski (United Kingdom) Nick Yelloly	LMP2	361	15th	1st
2026	(Poland) Inter Europol Competition	343	Oreca 07-Gibson	(France) Reshad de Gerus (United States) Bijoy Garg (Switzerland) Nico Müller	LMP2	360	16th	2nd

=== FIA World Endurance Championship ===
Year	Class	No	Chassis	Engine	Drivers	1	2	3	4	5	6	7	Pos.	Pts
2021	LMP2	34	Oreca 07	Gibson GK428 4.2 L V8	(United Kingdom) Alex Brundle (all rounds) (Poland) Jakub Śmiechowski (all rounds) (Netherlands) Renger van der Zande (rounds 1, 3–6) (Switzerland) Louis Delétraz (round 2)	SPA; 5	POR; 5	MON; 4	LMN; 5	BAH; 9	BAH; 5		5th	84
2022	LMP2	34	Oreca 07	Gibson GK428 4.2 L V8	(Mexico) Esteban Gutiérrez (all rounds) (Switzerland) Fabio Scherer (round 1) (Poland) Jakub Śmiechowski (all rounds) (United Kingdom) Alex Brundle (rounds 2–6)	SEB; 14	SPA; RET	LMN; 13	MON; 4	FUJ; 11	BAH; RET		11th	20
2023	LMP2	34	Oreca 07	Gibson GK428 4.2 L V8	(Spain) Albert Costa (Switzerland) Fabio Scherer (Poland) Jakub Śmiechowski	SEB; 4	POR; 10	SPA; 3	LMN; 1	MON; 5	FUJ; 9	BAH; 6	2nd	114

=== IMSA SportsCar Championship ===
Year	Class	No	Chassis	Engine	Drivers	1	2	3	4	5	6	7	Pos.	Pts
2020	LMP2	51	Oreca 07	Gibson GK428 4.2 L V8	(United States) Rob Hodes (round 5) (United States) Austin McCusker (round 5) (Poland) Jakub Śmiechowski (rounds 5, 7) (United Kingdom) Matthew Bell (round 7) (United States) Naveen Rao (round 7)	DAY	SEB	ELK	ATL	PLM; 3	LGA	SEB; 4	6th	58
2024	LMP2	52 (Note: The team has partnered with the PR1/Mathiasen Motorsports team, with Inter Europol by PR1/Mathiasen Motorsports being the name of the entry.)	Oreca 07	Gibson GK428 4.2 L V8	(United States) Nick Boulle (all rounds) (France) Tom Dillmann (all rounds) (Brazil) Pietro Fittipaldi (round 1) (Poland) Jakub Śmiechowski (rounds 1–3, 6–7)	DAY; 4	SEB; 6	WAT; 3	MOS; 1	RAM; 7	IND; 2	PLM; 4	1st	2227
2025	LMP2	43	Oreca 07	Gibson GK428 4.2 L V8	(France) Tom Dillmann (rounds 1–4, 6–7) (Portugal) António Félix da Costa (round 1) (United States) Jon Field (round 1) (United States) Bijoy Garg (rounds 1–3, 6–7) (United States) Jeremy Clarke (rounds 2–7) (United States) Connor De Phillippi (round 5)	DAY; 10	SEB; 1	WAT; 8	MOS; 10	RAM; 2	IND; 2	PLM; 2	3rd	2117
2026	LMP2	43	Oreca 07	Gibson GK428 4.2 L V8	(United States) Jeremy Clarke (all rounds) (France) Tom Dillmann (all rounds) (Portugal) António Félix da Costa (round 1) (United States) Bijoy Garg (rounds 1–3, 5, 7)	DAY; 2	SEB; 11	WAT; 4	MOS; 1	RAM; 1	IND; 6	PLM; 2	2nd	2302
2026	LMP2	343	Oreca 07	Gibson GK428 4.2 L V8	(New Zealand) Nick Cassidy (Greece) Georgios Kolovos (United States) Nolan Siegel (Poland) Jakub Śmiechowski	DAY; 3	SEB	WAT	MOS	RAM	IND	PLM	12th	325
2027	LMP2	43	Oreca 07	Gibson GK428 4.2 L V8	(United States) Jeremy Clarke (France) Tom Dillmann (Portugal) António Félix da Costa (United States) Bijoy Garg	DAY	SEB	WAT	MOS	RAM	IND	PLM		
2027	LMP2	343	Oreca 07	Gibson GK428 4.2 L V8	(United States) Dan Goldburg (United States) Nolan Siegel (Poland) Jakub Śmiechowski (United Kingdom) Nick Yelloly	DAY	SEB	WAT	MOS	RAM	IND	PLM		

=== European Le Mans Series ===
Year	Class	No	Chassis	Engine	Drivers	1	2	3	4	5	6	Pos.	Pts
2016	LMP3	13	Ligier JS P3	Nissan VK50VE 5.0 L V8	(Germany) Jens Petersen (Poland) Jakub Śmiechowski	SIL; RET	IMO; 15	RBR; RET	LEC; 7	SPA; 6	EST; 5	10th	24.5
2017	LMP3	13	Ligier JS P3	Nissan VK50VE 5.0 L V8	(Germany) Martin Hippe (Poland) Jakub Śmiechowski	SIL; 6	MON; 6	RBR; 5	LEC; 2	SPA; 4	POR; RET	5th	56
2018	LMP3	13	Ligier JS P3	Nissan VK50VE 5.0 L V8	(Germany) Martin Hippe (Poland) Jakub Śmiechowski	LEC; 6	MON; 4	RBR; 3	SIL; 5	SPA; 12	POR; 1	2nd	70.25
2018	LMP3	14	Ligier JS P3	Nissan VK50VE 5.0 L V8	(Germany) Paul Scheuschner (all rounds) (Italy) Luca Demarchi (rounds 1–5) (Sweden) Henning Enqvist (round 1) (Germany) Hendrik Still (rounds 2, 4) (Italy) Guglielmo Belotti (round 3) (Switzerland) Moritz Müller-Crepon (rounds 5–6)	LEC; 12	MON; 15	RBR; 11	SIL; 13	SPA; 15	POR; 8	15th	6.25
2019	LMP2	34	Ligier JS P217	Gibson GK428 4.2 L V8	(Poland) Jakub Śmiechowski (all rounds) (Spain) Dani Clos (rounds 1–3) (France) Léo Roussel (rounds 1–2) (France) Adrien Tambay (rounds 3–4) (Austria) Lukas Dunner (round 4) (Belgium) Sam Dejonghe (rounds 5–6) (Switzerland) Mathias Beche (rounds 5–6)	LEC; 15	MON; 13	CAT; RET	SIL; 12	SPA; 12	POR; RET	17th	2
2019	LMP3	13	Ligier JS P3	Nissan VK50VE 5.0 L V8	(Germany) Martin Hippe (United Kingdom) Nigel Moore	LEC; 3	MON; 2	CAT; 1	SIL; 2	SPA; 2	POR; 11	2nd	94.5
2019	LMP3	14	Ligier JS P3	Nissan VK50VE 5.0 L V8	(Germany) Paul Scheuschner (all rounds) (France) Dino Lunardi (round 1) (Belgium) Sam Dejonghe (rounds 2–4) (Austria) Constantin Schöll (rounds 5–6)	LEC; 13	MON; 9	CAT; RET	SIL; RET	SPA; 6	POR; 7	12th	16.5
2020	LMP2	34	Ligier JS P217	Gibson GK428 4.2 L V8	(Poland) Jakub Śmiechowski (all rounds) (Austria) Rene Binder (all rounds) (Russia) Matevos Isaakyan (rounds 1–4)	LEC; 7	SPA; 11	LEC; 6	MON; 12	POR; RET	--	12th	15.5
2020	LMP3	13	Ligier JS P320	Nissan VK56DE 5.6 L V8	(Germany) Martin Hippe (all rounds) (United Kingdom) Nigel Moore (rounds 1–3) (France) Dino Lunardi (rounds 4–5)	LEC; 2	SPA; RET	LEC; 3	MON; 1	POR; 3	--	2nd	73
2021	LMP3	13	Ligier JS P320	Nissan VK56DE 5.6 L V8	(Germany) Martin Hippe (all rounds) (Belgium) Ugo de Wilde (all rounds) (France) Julien Falchero (round 1) (Belgium) Ulysse de Pauw (rounds 2–3) (Italy) Mattia Pasini (round 4) (Australia) Aidan Read (round 5) (France) Adam Eteki (round 6)	CAT; 3	RBR; 4	LEC; RET	MON; 3	SPA; RET	POR; 1	4th	67
2021	LMP3	14	Ligier JS P320	Nissan VK56DE 5.6 L V8	(Lithuania) Julius Adomavičius (rounds 1, 3) (Italy) Alessandro Bracalente (round 1) (Italy) Mattia Pasini (rounds 1–3, 5) (Lithuania) Gustas Grinbergas (round 2) (Poland) Mateusz Kaprzyk (rounds 2–6) (France) Erwin Creed (round 4) (Germany) Marius Zug (round 4) (Chile) Nico Pino (rounds 5–6) (Poland) Patryk Krupiński (round 6)	CAT; 8	RBR; 5	LEC; 6	MON; 7	SPA; RET	POR; 7	6th	36
2022	LMP2	43	Oreca 07	Gibson GK428 4.2 L V8	(Brazil) Pietro Fittipaldi (Denmark) David Heinemeier Hansson (Switzerland) Fabio Scherer	LEC; 11	IMO; 9	MON; 11	CAT; 16	SPA; 2	POR; 4	8th	32
2022	LMP3	13	Ligier JS P320	Nissan VK56DE 5.6 L V8	(United States) Charles Crews (Portugal) Guilherme Oliveira (Chile) Nico Pino	LEC; DSQ	IMO; 8	MON; 1	CAT; 1	SPA; 1	POR; RET	2nd	79
2022	LMP3	14	Ligier JS P320	Nissan VK56DE 5.6 L V8	(France) Noam Abramczyk (Canada) James Dayson (Poland) Mateusz Kaprzyk	LEC; 9	IMO; RET	MON; RET	CAT; 10	SPA; 8	POR; 8	13th	13
2023	LMP2	43	Oreca 07	Gibson GK428 4.2 L V8	(South Africa) Jonathan Aberdein (Angola) Rui Andrade (United Kingdom) Olli Caldwell	CAT; RET	LEC; 3	ARA; RET	SPA; RET	POR; 7	POR; 4	7th	33
2023	LMP3	13	Ligier JS P320	Nissan VK56DE 5.6 L V8	(United Kingdom) Kai Askey (United States) Wyatt Brichacek (Portugal) Miguel Cristóvão	CAT; 2	LEC; 6	ARA; RET	SPA; 2	POR; RET	POR; 4	4th	57
2024	LMP2	34	Oreca 07	Gibson GK428 4.2 L V8	(Italy) Luca Ghiotto (United Kingdom) Oliver Gray (France) Clément Novalak	CAT; 8	LEC; RET	IMO; 7	SPA; 4	MUG; 3	POR; 5	7th	47
2024	LMP2	43	Oreca 07	Gibson GK428 4.2 L V8	(Mexico) Sebastián Álvarez (France) Tom Dillmann (France) Vladislav Lomko	CAT; 6	LEC; 1	IMO; 4	SPA; 2	MUG; 7	POR; 4	2nd	81
2024	LMP3	88	Ligier JS P320	Nissan VK56DE 5.6 L V8	(United Kingdom) Kai Askey (United Arab Emirates) Alexander Bukhantsov (Portugal) Pedro Perino	CAT; 6	LEC; RET	IMO; 9	SPA; 9	MUG; 3	POR; RET	9th	27
2025	LMP2	34	Oreca 07	Gibson GK428 4.2 L V8	(Italy) Luca Ghiotto (Portugal) Pedro Perino (France) Jean-Baptiste Simmenauer	CAT; 9	LEC; 10	IMO; 6	SPA; 5	SIL; 9	POR; RET	10th	23
2025	LMP2	43	Oreca 07	Gibson GK428 4.2 L V8	(France) Tom Dillmann (Poland) Jakub Śmiechowski (United Kingdom) Nick Yelloly	CAT; 10	LEC; 2	IMO; 2	SPA; 2	SIL; 2	POR; 2	2nd	92
2025	LMP3	88	Ligier JS P325	Toyota V35A-FTS 3.5 L V6	(United Kingdom) Timothy Creswick (Belgium) Douwe Dedecker (United States) Reece Gold	CAT; 3	LEC; 4	IMO; 7	SPA; 3	SIL; 5	POR; 6	3rd	66
2026	LMP2	34	Oreca 07	Gibson GK428 4.2 L V8	(United States) Bijoy Garg (France) Reshad de Gerus	CAT; 2	LEC; 2	IMO; 6	SPA; 11	SIL; 6	POR; 8	6th	55
2026	LMP2	43	Oreca 07	Gibson GK428 4.2 L V8	(France) Tom Dillmann (all rounds) (Poland) Jakub Śmiechowski (all rounds) (United Kingdom) Nick Yelloly (rounds 1, 3–6) (Italy) Luca Ghiotto (round 2)	CAT; 5	LEC; 7	IMO; 9	SPA; 1	SIL; 9	POR; 3	5th	59
2026	LMP3	13	Ligier JS P325	Toyota V35A-FTS 3.5 L V6	(United Arab Emirates) Alexander Bukhantsov (Taiwan) Chun-Ting Chou (Colombia) Henry Cubides Olarte	CAT; 3	LEC; 1	IMO; 10	SPA; RET	SIL; 3	POR; 9	5th	58

=== Asian Le Mans Series ===
Year	Class	No	Chassis	Engine	Drivers	1	2	3	4	5	6	Pos.	Pts
2018-19	LMP3	13	Ligier JS P3	Nissan VK50VE 5.0 L V8	(Germany) Martin Hippe (Poland) Jakub Śmiechowski	SHA; 1	FUJ; 2	CHA; 2	SEP; 1			1st	87
2019-20	LMP2	33	Ligier JS P217	Gibson GK428 4.2 L V8	(Australia) John Corbett (all rounds) (Australia) Nathan Kumar (all rounds) (Australia) Mitchell Neilson (rounds 1–2) (Singapore) Danial Frost (rounds 3–4)	SHA; 5	BEN; 4	SEP; 6	CHA; 6			4th	38
2019-20	LMP2	34	Ligier JS P217	Gibson GK428 4.2 L V8	(Switzerland) Mathias Beche (Poland) Jakub Śmiechowski (United Kingdom) James Winslow	SHA; 4	BEN; RET	SEP; 5	CHA; 7			5th	28
2019-20	LMP3	13	Ligier JS P3	Nissan VK50VE 5.0 L V8	(Germany) Martin Hippe (United Kingdom) Nigel Moore	SHA; 1	BEN; 2	SEP; 3	CHA; RET			3rd	59
2019-20	LMP3	14	Ligier JS P3	Nissan VK50VE 5.0 L V8	(Australia) Peter Paddon (Australia) Garth Walden (United States) Austin McCusker		BEN; 4					9th	12
2019-20	LMP3	18	Ligier JS P3	Nissan VK50VE 5.0 L V8	(Hong Kong) Philip Kadoorie (United Kingdom) Dan Wells			SEP; 6	CHA; 6			8th	16
2022	LMP3	13	Ligier JS P320	Nissan VK56DE 5.6 L V8	(Russia) Alexander Bukhantsov (rounds 1–2) (Portugal) Guilherme Oliveira (all rounds) (Chile) Nico Pino (all rounds) (Canada) James Dayson (rounds 3–4)	DUB; 5	DUB; 5	ABU; 7	ABU; 5			7th	36
2023	LMP2	43	Oreca 07	Gibson GK428 4.2 L V8	(United States) Christian Bogle (United States) Charles Crews (United States) Nolan Siegel	DUB; RET	DUB; 1	ABU; 4	ABU; RET			5th	39
2023	LMP3	53	Ligier JS P320	Nissan VK56DE 5.6 L V8	(United Kingdom) Kai Askey (United States) Wyatt Brichacek (Portugal) Miguel Cristóvão	DUB; 9	DUB; RET	ABU; 9	ABU; 6			12th	12
2023	LMP3	63	Ligier JS P320	Nissan VK56DE 5.6 L V8	(Canada) Adam Ali (Canada) James Dayson (United States) John Schauerman	DUB; 11	DUB; 11	ABU; 12	ABU; RET			15th	0
2023	LMP3	73	Ligier JS P320	Nissan VK56DE 5.6 L V8	(United Arab Emirates) Alexander Bukhantsov (Australia) John Corbett (United Kingdom) James Winslow	DUB; 5	DUB; 7	ABU; 10	ABU; 5			7th	27
2024-25	LMP3	34	Ligier JS P320	Nissan VK56DE 5.6 L V8	(Canada) Daniel Ali (United Kingdom) Timothy Creswick (Belgium) Douwe Dedecker	SEP; RET	SEP; 5	DUB; 3	DUB; 5	ABU; 4	ABU; 6	5th	55
2024-25	LMP3	43	Ligier JS P320	Nissan VK56DE 5.6 L V8	(United Kingdom) Steve Brooks (Denmark) Mikkel Kristensen (Switzerland) Kevin Rabin	SEP; RET	SEP; 6	DUB; 5	DUB; 6	ABU; RET	ABU; 5	7th	36
2025-26	LMP2	43	Oreca 07	Gibson GK428 4.2 L V8	(New Zealand) Nick Cassidy (rounds 1–2) (Greece) Georgios Kolovos (all rounds) (United States) Nolan Siegel (all rounds) (United States) Bijoy Garg (rounds 3–6)	SEP; 13	SEP; 12	DUB; 11	DUB; RET	ABU; 9	ABU; 2	11th	20
2025-26	LMP3	13	Ligier JS P325	Toyota V35A-FTS 3.5 L V6	(Saint Kitts and Nevis) Alexander Bukhantsov (Taiwan) Chun-Ting Chou (Colombia) Henry Cubides Olarte	SEP; 1	SEP; 4	DUB; 1	DUB; 7	ABU; DSQ	ABU; 2	2nd	86
2026-27	LMP2	34	Oreca 07	Gibson GK428 4.2 L V8	(Canada) Antoine Comeau (United States) Bijoy Garg (Netherlands) Niels Koolen	LEC; 15	LEC; 13	JER	JER	POR	POR	15th*	0*
2026-27	LMP2	43	Oreca 07	Gibson GK428 4.2 L V8	(Germany) Torsten Kratz (United Kingdom) Cian Shields (United Kingdom) Nick Yelloly	LEC; 3	LEC; 14	JER	JER	POR	POR	7th*	15*

(*) Season in progress.

=== Le Mans Cup ===
Year	Class	No	Chassis	Engine	Drivers	1	2	3	4	5	6	7	Pos.	Pts
2022	LMP3	54	Ligier JS P320	Nissan VK56DE 5.6 L V8	(France) Noam Abramczyk (United States) Don Yount			LMN; RET	LMN; 20				-	-
2023	LMP3	13	Ligier JS P320	Nissan VK56DE 5.6 L V8	(Spain) Santiago Concepción Serrano (United Kingdom) Ben Stone	CAT; RET	LMN; 20	LMN; RET	LEC; RET	ARA; RET	SPA; RET	POR; 9	25th	2
2023	LMP3	14	Ligier JS P320	Nissan VK56DE 5.6 L V8	(Canada) Daniel Ali (Australia) Andres Latorre Canon	CAT; 22	LMN; DNS	LMN; 25	LEC; 12	ARA; RET	SPA; 16	POR; 18	28th	0
2023	LMP3	15	Ligier JS P320	Nissan VK56DE 5.6 L V8	(United States) Bryson Morris (United Kingdom) Chris Short	CAT; RET	LMN; 30	LMN; 12	LEC; 24	ARA; 13	SPA; 17	POR; 7	20th	6
2024	LMP3	34	Ligier JS P320	Nissan VK56DE 5.6 L V8	(United Arab Emirates) Alexander Bukhantsov (Netherlands) Rik Koen	CAT; 3	LEC; 8	LMN; RET	LMN; 11	SPA; RET	MUG; 9	POR; 16	11th	21
2024	LMP3	43	Ligier JS P320	Nissan VK56DE 5.6 L V8	(United Kingdom) Timothy Creswick (all rounds) (Denmark) Sebastian Gravlund (rounds 1–5, 7) (Canada) Daniel Ali (round 6)	CAT; 10	LEC; 22	LMN; DNS	LMN; 20	SPA; RET	MUG; 18	POR; 9	19th	3
2025	LMP3; Pro/Am	34	Ligier JS P325	Toyota V35A-FTS 3.5 L V6	(United States) Ari Balogh (rounds 1–2) (Canada) Garett Grist (rounds 1–2) (Sweden) William Karlsson (rounds 3–4) (United Kingdom) Chris Short (rounds 3–4) (United Kingdom) Timothy Creswick (round 5) (United States) Bijoy Garg (round 5) (Portugal) Jose Cautela (round 7) (United States) Shawn Rashid (round 7)	CAT; 11	LEC; 10	LMN; 5	LMN; 5	SPA; 3	SIL	POR; 4	6th	40
2025	LMP3; Pro/Am	43	Ligier JS P325	Toyota V35A-FTS 3.5 L V6	(China) David Pun (Brazil) Sérgio Sette Câmara	CAT	LEC	LMN; 10	LMN; 7	SPA	SIL	POR	14th	5
2025	LMP3	5	Ligier JS P325	Toyota V35A-FTS 3.5 L V6	(United States) Brady Golan (United States) Nolan Siegel	CAT	LEC	LMN	LMN	SPA	SIL; 15	POR	-	-
2026	LMP3; Pro/Am	34	Ligier JS P325	Toyota V35A-FTS 3.5 L V6	(United Arab Emirates) Alexander Bukhantsov (all rounds) (United States) Shawn Rashid (rounds 1–3) (United Kingdom) George King (round 4) (United Kingdom) James Winslow (round 5) (Denmark) Christian Dannemand Jørgensen (round 6)	CAT; 5	LEC; 4	LMN; DSQ	SPA; 3	SIL; 7	POR; 3		5th	63
2026	LMP3	43	Ligier JS P325	Toyota V35A-FTS 3.5 L V6	(Denmark) Christian Dannemand Jørgensen (rounds 1–5) (Sweden) William Karlsson (rounds 1–3) (Canada) Jonathan Woolridge (round 4) (United Kingdom) Callum Voisin (round 5)	CAT; 12	LEC; RET	LMN; 16	SPA; 16	SIL; 7	POR		15th	6

== Timeline ==
Current series
European Le Mans Series	2016–present
Asian Le Mans Series	2018–2020, 2022–2023, 2024–present
Le Mans Cup	2023–present
IMSA SportsCar Championship	2024–present
Former series
Formula Renault 2.0 NEC	2010–2016
BOSS GP	2014–2019
V de V Endurance Series	2016–2018
FIA World Endurance Championship	2021–2023
