= 2027 24 Hours of Daytona =

Endurance sports car race in Florida, US

Previous: 2026	Next: 2028
Index: Races | Winners

Map of the Daytona International Speedway combined road course

The 2027 24 Hours of Daytona will be the 65th Daytona 24 Hours endurance sports car race sanctioned by International Motor Sports Association (IMSA), taking place from January 28 to January 31, 2027, at the Daytona International Speedway combined road course in Daytona Beach, Florida. The race will be the opening round of the 2027 IMSA SportsCar Championship season.

IMSA SportsCar Championship
Previous race: none	2027 season	Next race: 12 Hours of Sebring
