= Nicolai Sylvest =

Danish racing driver (born 1997)

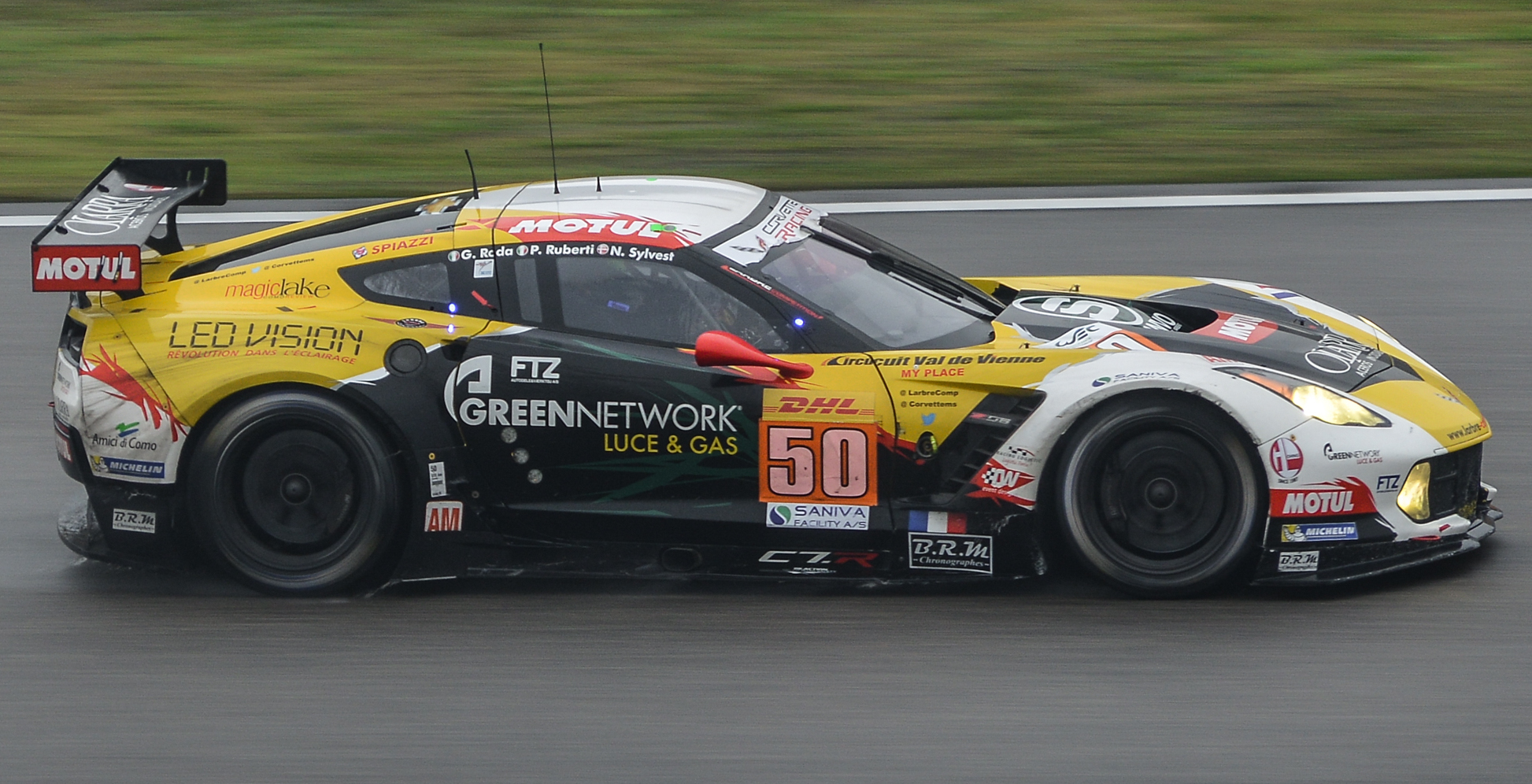
- Sylvest driving for Larbre Compétition in 2015
- Nationality: (Denmark) Danish
- Born: 23 June 1997 (age 29) Jægerspris, Denmark
- Categorisation: FIA Silver

Championship titles
- 2012: Formula Ford Denmark

Nicolai Sylvest (born 23 June 1997) is a Danish racing driver who last raced for Birk Motorsport in Super GT Denmark.

== Personal life ==
Sylvest is the son of Jesper Sylvest, a former racing driver who won the 1999 Danish Touringcar Championship.

== Career ==
Sylvest made his full-time karting debut in 2009, a year in which he won the Danish Karting Championship in the Cadet class. After spending the next two years in KF3, Sylvest made his single-seater debut in 2012 by racing in various Formula Ford Championships around Europe. Mainly racing in the Danish championship, Sylvest scored five wins and 11 more podiums to clinch the title at season's end.

Having spent most of 2013 on the sidelines, Sylvest partook in a Formula 3 test at Lausitzring with JBR Motorsport & Engineering, before joining them to race in two of the final three rounds of that year's German Formula Three Championship. Racing at the Lausitzring and Hockenheimring rounds, Sylvest scored a best result of seventh in race two in the former. Remaining with the team for his first full season of German Formula Three the following year, Sylvest scored his maiden podium at Lausitzring, before taking his only win of the season four rounds later at the Nürburgring en route to a sixth-place points finish.

Sylvest switched to GT3 competition for 2015, joining Mercedes-fielding Rowe Racing to compete in all but one rounds of the Blancpain Endurance Series. In the midst of his only campaign in the series, in which he scored a lone point at Monza, Sylvest competed in two rounds of the FIA World Endurance Championship for Larbre Compétition in the LMGTE Am class. Racing at Fuji and Shanghai, Sylvest scored a best result of fourth in class in the former.

The following year, Sylvest joined Mercedes-fielding Zakspeed to make his ADAC GT Masters debut alongside Nikolaj Rogivue from the second round onwards. Racing in the final six rounds of the season, Sylvest scored his maiden podium by finishing third in race one at the Nürburgring, before ending the season with a third-place finish in race two at Hockenheimring to take 20th in the overall standings.

Remaining with Zakspeed for the following two years, Sylvest scored only two points in 2017 with a best result of ninth in Hockenheimring, whereas in 2018, he scored his third series podium at Sachsenring en route to a 21st-place points finish. For his fourth season in ADAC GT Masters, Sylvest switched to BMW-fielding MRS GT-Racing alongside Jens Klingmann. In their only full-time season together, the pair scored a lone win at the Red Bull Ring and ended the year 14th in points.

Switching to TCR competition for 2020, Sylvest joined LM Racing in the newly-established TCR Denmark alongside Jan Magnussen. In the season's first season, Sylvest took a lone win in the opening Jyllands-Ringen and scored four more podiums to finish third in the overall standings. During 2020, Sylvest also contested the opening round of ADAC GT Masters with MRS GT-Racing. Remaining with LM Racing for his sophomore season in TCR Denmark, Sylvest took four wins across the last two Jyllands-Ringen rounds to finish fourth in points, 23 behind teammate Jan Magnussen.

In 2022, Sylvest stayed in TCR Denmark for a third season, as he joined series newcomers Green Development. Sylvest began the season with a win at Ring Djursland, before taking a pair of wins at Copenhagen, and ending the season with two more wins at Jyllands-Ringen and Padborg Park to end the year third in points. Remaining with Green Development for a fourth season in TCR Denmark, Sylvest took wins at Ring Djursland and in Copenhagen to secure third in points for the second consecutive year.

After spending a season on the sidelines, Sylvest returned to racing by joining Birk Motorsport to race in Super GT Denmark. In his maiden season in the series, Sylvest won two races before leaving the team ahead of the fourth round.

== Karting record ==
=== Karting career summary ===
Season	Series	Team	Position
2009	ROK Cup International Final – Mini Rok		12th
2010	South Garda Winter Cup – KF3	Becher-Madsen Service	NC
2010	Viking Trophy – KF3	Becher-Madsen Service	13th
2010	Andrea Margutti Trophy – KF3	Rium Motorfast	26th
2010	Karting European Championship – KF3	Becher-Madsen Service; Ricky Flynn Motorsport	NC
2010	Karting World Cup – KF3	Ricky Flynn Motorsport	NC
2011	South Garda Winter Cup – KF3	Babyrace Driver Academy	12th
2011	WSK Super Master Series – KF3	Babyrace Driver Academy	3rd
2011	WSK Euro Series – KF3	Babyrace Driver Academy	4th
2011	Karting European Championship – KF3	Babyrace Driver Academy	NC
2011	Karting World Cup – KF3	Babyrace Driver Academy	NC

== Racing record ==
=== Racing career summary ===
Season	Series	Team	Races	Wins	Poles	F/Laps	Podiums	Points	Position
2012	Formula Ford Denmark	Fluid Motorsport	21	5	2	7	16	340	**1st**
2012	Dutch Formula Ford Championship	Fluid Motorsport	6	0	0	0	1	48	13th
2012	British Formula Ford Championship	Fluid Motorsport	3	0	0	0	0	0	NC
2012	Formula Ford NEZ	Fluid Motorsport Scandinavia	3	0	0	0	0	36	**2nd**
2013	German Formula Three Championship	JBR Motorsport & Engineering	6	0	0	0	0	11	15th
2014	German Formula Three Championship	JBR Motorsport & Engineering	17	1	0	0	4	182	6th
2015	Blancpain Endurance Series – Pro	Team Astana by Rowe	4	0	0	0	0	1	27th
2015	FIA World Endurance Championship – LMGTE Am	Larbre Compétition	2	0	0	0	0	22	17th
2016	ADAC GT Masters	AMG - Team Zakspeed	11	0	0	0	2	41	20th
2016	24H Series – A6 Pro	Massive Motorsport	3	0	0	0	1	35	7th
2016	Danish Thundersport Championship	Demetra by Massive Motorsport	8	0	0	0	1	52	20th
2017	ADAC GT Masters	Team Zakspeed	14	0	1	0	0	2	37th
2018	ADAC GT Masters	Team Zakspeed BKK Mobil Oil Racing	14	0	1	0	1	26	21st
2018	VLN Endurance	MKR-Engineering	1	0	0	0	0	6.56	610th
2019	ADAC GT Masters	MRS GT-Racing	14	1	1	1	1	71	14th
2019	VLN Series – Cup 3	Overdrive Racing	1	0	0	0	0	5	35th
2019	VLN Series – Cup 5	MKR-Engineering	1	0	0	0	0	3.93	84th
2020	TCR Denmark Touring Car Series	LM Racing	15	1	0	3	5	231	**3rd**
2020	ADAC GT Masters	MRS GT-Racing	2	0	0	0	0	0	NC
2021	TCR Denmark Touring Car Series	LM Racing	20	4	2	8	9	286	4th
2021	Lamborghini Super Trofeo Europe – Pro	GSM Racing	2	0	0	0	0	6	15th
2022	TCR Denmark Touring Car Series	Green Development	21	5	1	4	12	387	**3rd**
2023	TCR Denmark Touring Car Series	Green Development	20	2	1	3	10	313	**3rd**
2023	Nürburgring Langstrecken-Serie – TCR	Halder Motorsport	1	0	0	0	0	0	NC
2025	Selected Car Group Super GT Danmark	Birk Motorsport	6	2	1	0	2	124	18th

=== Complete German Formula Three Championship results ===
(key) (Races in bold indicate pole position) (Races in italics indicate fastest lap)

Year	Entrant	1	2	3	4	5	6	7	8	9	10	11	12	13	14	15	16	17	18	19	20	21	22	23	24	25	26	27	DC	Points
2013	JBR Motorsport & Engineering	OSC1; 1	OSC1; 2	OSC1; 2	SPA; 1	SPA; 2	SPA; 3	NÜR1; 1	NÜR1; 2	NÜR1; 3	SAC; 1	SAC; 2	SAC; 3	LAU1; 1	LAU1; 2	LAU1; 3	NÜR2; 1	NÜR2; 2	NÜR2; 3	LAU2; 1; 12	LAU2; 2; 7	LAU2; 3; 11	OSC2; 1	OSC2; 2	OSC2; 3	HOC; 1; 9	HOC; 2; 8	HOC; 3; 9	15th	11
2014	JBR Motorsport & Engineering	OSC; 1; 4	OSC; 2; 10	OSC; 2; 6	LAU1; 1; 3	LAU1; 2; 4	LAU1; 3; 6	RBR; 1; 11	RBR; 2; 5	RBR; 3; 5	HOC1; 1; 8	HOC1; 2; 9	HOC1; 3; 3	NÜR; 1; 3	NÜR; 2; 1	NÜR; 3; 5	LAU2; 1; 5	LAU2; 2 C	LAU2; 3; 5	SAC; 1; 5	SAC; 2; 4	SAC; 3; 6	HOC2; 1 DSQ	HOC2; 2; 4	HOC2; 3; 4				6th	182

=== Complete GT World Challenge Europe results ===
==== GT World Challenge Europe Endurance Cup ====
Year	Team	Car	Class	1	2	3	4	5	6	7	Pos.	Pts
2015	Team Astana by Rowe	Mercedes-Benz SLS AMG GT3	Pro	MNZ; 15	SIL; 11	LEC; Ret	SPA; 6H	SPA; 12H	SPA; 24H	NÜR; 15	27th	1

=== Complete FIA World Endurance Championship results ===
Year	Entrant	Class	Car	Engine	1	2	3	4	5	6	7	8	Rank	Points
2015	Larbre Compétition	LMGTE Am	Chevrolet Corvette C7.R	Chevrolet LT5.5R 5.5 L V8	SIL	SPA	LMS	NÜR	COA	FUJ; 4	SHA; 5	BHR	17th	22

=== Complete ADAC GT Masters results ===
(key) (Races in bold indicate pole position) (Races in italics indicate fastest lap)

Year	Team	Car	1	2	3	4	5	6	7	8	9	10	11	12	13	14	DC	Points
2016	AMG - Team Zakspeed	Mercedes-AMG GT3	OSC; 1	OSC; 2	SAC; 1; 25	SAC; 2; 18	LAU; 1; 10	LAU; 2; 14	RBR; 1; 7	RBR; 2; 18	NÜR; 1; 3	NÜR; 2; 28	ZAN; 1 DNS	ZAN; 2 Ret	HOC; 1; 8	HOC; 2; 3	20th	41
2017	Mercedes-AMG Team Zakspeed	Mercedes-AMG GT3	OSC; 1; 21	OSC; 2; 13	LAU; 1 Ret	LAU; 2; 18	RBR; 1; 22	RBR; 2; 15	ZAN; 1; 16	ZAN; 2; 23	NÜR; 1; 20	NÜR; 2 Ret	SAC; 1 DSQ	**SAC**; **2** DSQ			37th	2
2017	Team Zakspeed	Mercedes-AMG GT3													HOC; 1; 9	HOC; 2; 15	37th	2
2018	Team Zakspeed BKK Mobil Oil Racing	Mercedes-AMG GT3	OSC; 1; 21	OSC; 2; 31	MST; 1; 14	MST; 2; 26	RBR; 1; 22	RBR; 2; 23	**NÜR**; **1**; 22	NÜR; 2; 16	ZAN; 1; 25	ZAN; 2; 17	SAC; 1; 2	SAC; 2; 6	HOC; 1; 18	HOC; 2 Ret	21st	26
2019	MRS GT-Racing	BMW M6 GT3	OSC; 1; 16	OSC; 2; 6	MST; 1 Ret	MST; 2; 22	**RBR**; **1**; 1	RBR; 2; 4	ZAN; 1; 6	ZAN; 2 Ret	NÜR; 1; 10	NÜR; 2 Ret	HOC; 1; 18	HOC; 2; 26	SAC; 1; 14	SAC; 2; 12	14th	71
2020	MRS GT-Racing	BMW M6 GT3	LAU1; 1 Ret	LAU1; 2 Ret	NÜR; 1	NÜR; 2	HOC; 1	HOC; 2	SAC; 1	SAC; 2	RBR; 1	RBR; 2	LAU2; 1	LAU2; 2	OSC; 1	OSC; 2	NC	0
