= 2021 TCR Denmark Touring Car Series =

Car racing series

The 2021 TCR Denmark Touring Car Series was the second season of the TCR Denmark Touring Car Series.

== Teams and drivers ==
Team	Car	No.	Drivers	Class	Rounds	Ref.
(Denmark) Carlsen Motorsport	Peugeot 308 TCR	4	(Denmark) Michael Carlsen	T	All	
(Denmark) Brian Madsen Motorsport	Peugeot 308 TCR	5	(Denmark) Johnny Vejlebo	T	All	
(Denmark) Brian Madsen Motorsport	Peugeot 308 TCR	16	(Denmark) Casper Elgaard		All	
(Denmark) Brian Madsen Motorsport	Peugeot 308 TCR	44	(Denmark) Gustav Birch	U	All	
(Denmark) Massive Motorsport	Honda Civic Type R TCR (FK8)	6	(Denmark) Kasper H. Jensen		All	
(Denmark) Massive Motorsport	Honda Civic Type R TCR (FK8)	88	(Denmark) Kenn Bach	T	All	
(Denmark) Madbull Racing	CUPRA León TCR	7	(Denmark) Kim Lund	T	1–2, 4–6	
(Denmark) Meteor Racing	Volkswagen Golf GTI TCR	8	(Denmark) Allan Kristensen	T	All	
(Denmark) Meteor Racing	Volkswagen Golf GTI TCR	41	(Denmark) René Povlsen	T	All	
(Denmark) Insight Racing	Alfa Romeo Giulietta Veloce TCR	9	(Denmark) Jacob Mathiassen		All	
(Denmark) Insight Racing	Alfa Romeo Giulietta Veloce TCR	10	(Norway) Kristian Sætheren	U	All	
(Denmark) Insight Racing	Alfa Romeo Giulietta TCR	17	(Denmark) Philip Lindberg		1–2, 4–7	
(Denmark) LM Racing	CUPRA León Competición TCR	11	(Denmark) Nicolai Sylvest		All	
(Denmark) LM Racing	CUPRA León Competición TCR	23	(Denmark) Jan Magnussen		1–3, 5–7	
(Denmark) Sally Racing	CUPRA León TCR	12	(Denmark) Peter Obel		4	
(Sweden) TPR Motorsport	Honda Civic Type R TCR (FK8)	14	(Sweden) William Nyberg	U T	All	
(Sweden) TPR Motorsport	Honda Civic Type R TCR (FK8)	94	(Denmark) Louise Frost		1, 3–7	
(Denmark) Markussen Racing	Peugeot 308 TCR	18	(Denmark) Michael Markussen		All	
(Denmark) Larsen Motorsport	Honda Civic Type R TCR (FK2)	20	(Denmark) Steffen Larsen	T	1–2, 4, 7	
(Denmark) Højris Motorsport	Opel Astra TCR	33	(Denmark) Lars Højris	T	1–2, 4–7	
(Denmark) Miccar Racing	Honda Civic Type R TCR (FK2)	71	(Denmark) Carsten Lorenzen	T	All	

Icon	Class
T	Trophy
U	U23/Drivers below 23

== Calendar and results ==
The 2021 calendar was introduced on December 12, 2020. The first and second stages was postponed on April 22 to a later date. .

Rnd.		Circuit	Date	Pole position	Fastest lap	Winning driver	Winning team	Trophy winner	U23 winner	Info
1	R1	Ring Djursland	5–6 June	(Denmark) Jan Magnussen	(Denmark) Jan Magnussen	(Denmark) Jan Magnussen	(Denmark) LM Racing	(Denmark) Michael Carlsen	(Denmark) Gustav Birch	
1	R2	Ring Djursland	5–6 June		(Denmark) Jan Magnussen	(Denmark) Jan Magnussen	(Denmark) LM Racing	(Denmark) René Povlsen	(Norway) Kristian Sætheren	
1	R3	Ring Djursland	5–6 June		(Denmark) Jan Magnussen	(Denmark) Jan Magnussen	(Denmark) LM Racing	(Denmark) Michael Carlsen	(Denmark) Gustav Birch	
2	R4	Jyllandsringen	3–4 July	(Denmark) Nicolai Sylvest	(Denmark) Jan Magnussen	(Denmark) Jan Magnussen	(Denmark) LM Racing	(Denmark) Kenn Bach	(Denmark) Gustav Birch	
2	R5	Jyllandsringen	3–4 July		(Denmark) Jan Magnussen	(Denmark) Michael Carlsen	(Denmark) Carlsen Motorsport	(Denmark) Michael Carlsen	(Denmark) Gustav Birch	
2	R6	Jyllandsringen	3–4 July		(Denmark) Jan Magnussen	(Denmark) Jan Magnussen	(Denmark) LM Racing	(Denmark) Michael Carlsen	(Sweden) William Nyberg	
3	R7	Copenhagen	6–8 August	(Denmark) Michael Markussen	(Denmark) Gustav Birch	(Denmark) Kasper H. Jensen	(Denmark) Massive Motorsport	(Denmark) Johnny Vejlebo	(Denmark) Gustav Birch	
3	R8	Copenhagen	6–8 August		(Denmark) Nicolai Sylvest	(Denmark) Casper Elgaard	(Denmark) Brian Madsen Motorsport	(Denmark) Kenn Bach	(Norway) Kristian Sætheren	
3	R9	Copenhagen	6–8 August		(Denmark) Nicolai Sylvest	(Denmark) Kasper H. Jensen	(Denmark) Massive Motorsport	(Denmark) Michael Carlsen	(Denmark) Gustav Birch	
4	R10	Jyllandsringen	20–22 August	(Denmark) Nicolai Sylvest	(Denmark) Nicolai Sylvest	(Denmark) Nicolai Sylvest	(Denmark) LM Racing	(Denmark) René Povlsen	(Norway) Kristian Sætheren	
4	R11	Jyllandsringen	20–22 August		(Denmark) Casper Elgaard	(Denmark) Casper Elgaard	(Denmark) Brian Madsen Motorsport	(Denmark) Michael Carlsen	(Norway) Kristian Sætheren	
4	R12	Jyllandsringen	20–22 August		(Denmark) Nicolai Sylvest	(Denmark) Nicolai Sylvest	(Denmark) LM Racing	(Denmark) Kenn Bach	(Denmark) Gustav Birch	
5	R13	Aarhus	17–19 September	(Denmark) Jan Magnussen	(Denmark) Jan Magnussen	(Denmark) Jan Magnussen	(Denmark) LM Racing	(Denmark) Kenn Bach	(Norway) Kristian Sætheren	
5	R14	Aarhus	17–19 September		(Denmark) Nicolai Sylvest	(Denmark) Casper Elgaard	(Denmark) Brian Madsen Motorsport	(Denmark) Kenn Bach	(Norway) Kristian Sætheren	
5	R15	Aarhus	17–19 September		(Denmark) Kasper H. Jensen	(Denmark) Kasper H. Jensen	(Denmark) Massive Motorsport	(Denmark) Johnny Vejlebo	(Sweden) William Nyberg	
6	R16	Jyllandsringen	2–3 October	(Denmark) Kasper H. Jensen	(Denmark) Nicolai Sylvest	(Denmark) Nicolai Sylvest	(Denmark) LM Racing	(Denmark) Kenn Bach	(Denmark) Gustav Birch	
6	R17	Jyllandsringen	2–3 October		(Denmark) Michael Markussen	(Denmark) Jan Magnussen	(Denmark) LM Racing	(Denmark) Michael Carlsen	(Denmark) Gustav Birch	
6	R18	Jyllandsringen	2–3 October		(Denmark) Nicolai Sylvest	(Denmark) Nicolai Sylvest	(Denmark) LM Racing	(Denmark) Michael Carlsen	(Denmark) Gustav Birch	
7	R19	Padborg Park	15–17 October	(Denmark) Kasper H. Jensen	(Denmark) Nicolai Sylvest	(Denmark) Jan Magnussen	(Denmark) LM Racing	(Denmark) Kenn Bach	(Denmark) Gustav Birch	
7	R20	Padborg Park	15–17 October		(Denmark) Michael Markussen	(Denmark) Michael Markussen	(Denmark) Markussen Racing	(Denmark) Michael Carlsen	(Denmark) Gustav Birch	
7	R21	Padborg Park	15–17 October		(Denmark) Kasper H. Jensen	(Denmark) Kasper H. Jensen	(Denmark) Massive Motorsport	(Denmark) Kenn Bach	(Norway) Kristian Sætheren	

Scoring system

Position	**1st**	**2nd**	**3rd**	**4th**	**5th**	**6th**	**7th**	**8th**	**9th**	**10th**	**11th**	**12th**	**13th**	**14th**	**15th**	**16th**	**17th**
Race	25	20	17	15	13	12	11	10	9	8	7	6	5	4	3	2	1

=== Drivers' championship ===
Pos.	Driver	DJU			JYL1			COP			JYL2			ARH			JYL3			PDB			Pts.
Pos.	Driver	RD1	RD2	RD3	RD1	RD2	RD3	RD1	RD2	RD3	RD1	RD2	RD3	RD1	RD2	RD3	RD1	RD2	RD3	RD1	RD2	RD3	Pts.
1	(Denmark) Kasper H. Jensen	4	2	2	2	5	15	1	3	1	2	3	3	2	3	1	**3**	3	3	**2**	6	1	371
2	(Denmark) Michael Markussen	6	4	6	8	2	4	**2**	4	2	5	4	4	3	2	2	7	2	4	3	1	2	327
3	(Denmark) Jan Magnussen	**1**	1	1	1	6	1	Ret	DNS	DNS				**1**	4	Ret	2	1	2	1	3	3	309
4	(Denmark) Nicolai Sylvest	2	Ret	DNS	**3**	7	6	3	2	3	**1**	8	1	15	5	Ret	1	4	1	12	4	4	286
5	(Denmark) Casper Elgaard	3	3	3	4	3	3	5	1	5	4	1	2	4	1	Ret	Ret	8	7	6	12	6	280
6	(Denmark) Michael Carlsen	7	7	5	10	1	2	11	9	7	10	6	9	11	10	Ret	5	5	5	7	8	15	186
7	(Denmark) René Povlsen	8	6	7	9	4	5	9	10	9	6	13	8	10	9	5	10	6	11	5	10	9	168
8	(Denmark) Kenn Bach	10	8	9	7	8	7	8	5	DSQ	13	9	7	6	6	10	4	17	6	4	9	8	162
9	(Denmark) Gustav Birch	9	13	8	6	9	16†	4	Ret	4	9	5	5	9	DSQ	13	6	9	8	8	7	11	150
10	(Denmark) Jacob Mathiassen	5	5	4	5	18†	9	14†	DNS	DNS	3	10	Ret	Ret	7	3	9	Ret	DNS	10	2	5	146
11	(Norway) Kristian Sætheren	11	9	10	11	11	Ret	13	8	12	8	2	6	7	18	Ret	11	10	9	11	11	10	125
12	(Denmark) Johnny Vejlebo	12	12	13	18	12	8	6	Ret	10	15	12	16	8	8	4	18	14	12	16	14	13	85
13	(Denmark) Philip Lindberg	Ret	14	17†	19†	15	10				7	7	Ret	5	13	Ret	8	Ret	15	9	5	7	77
14	(Denmark) Allan Kristensen	Ret	10	11	14	13	11	10	6	8	19†	15	11	Ret	14	12	13	11	Ret	Ret	18†	12	70
15	(Denmark) Louise Frost	WD	WD	WD				7	7	6	DNS	DNS	DNS	Ret	11	6	16	12	Ret	DSQ	DNS	DNS	48
16	(Denmark) Kim Lund Johansen	Ret	15	Ret	12	14	Ret				11	11	10	Ret	12	8	12	7	10				45
17	(Sweden) William Nyberg	14	16	14	16	17	12	12	12	11	16	Ret	14	12	15	7	17	15	Ret	14	13	Ret	44
18	(Denmark) Steffen Larsen	13	11	12	15	10	Ret				12	14	12							Ret	16	14	31
19	(Denmark) Lars Højris	16†	17	15	13	Ret	13				14	Ret	13	13	17†	9	14	16	13	15	15	Ret	30
20	(Denmark) Carsten Lorenzen	15	18	16	17	16	14	15	11	13	18	17†	DNS	14	16	11	15	13	14	13	17	16†	29
21	(Denmark) Peter Obel										17	16	15										1
Pos.	Driver	DJU			JYL1			COP			JYL2			ARH			JYL3			PDB			Pts.

Colour	Result
Gold	Winner
Silver	Second place
Bronze	Third place
Green	Points classification
Blue	Non-points classification
Blue	Non-classified finish (NC)
Purple	Retired, not classified (Ret)
Red	Did not qualify (DNQ)
Red	Did not pre-qualify (DNPQ)
Black	Disqualified (DSQ)
White	Did not start (DNS)
White	Withdrew (WD)
White	Race cancelled (C)
Blank	Did not practice (DNP)
Blank	Did not arrive (DNA)
Blank	Excluded (EX)

**Bold** – Pole
Italics – Fastest Lap

† – Drivers did not finish the race, but were classified as they completed over 75% of the race distance.

=== Teams' championship ===
Pos.	Driver	DJU			JYL1			COP			JYL2			ARH			JYL3			PDB			Pts.
Pos.	Driver	RD1	RD2	RD3	RD1	RD2	RD3	RD1	RD2	RD3	RD1	RD2	RD3	RD1	RD2	RD3	RD1	RD2	RD3	RD1	RD2	RD3	Pts.
1	(Denmark) LM Racing	**1**	1	1	1	6	1	3	2	3	**1**	8	1	15	5	Ret	1	4	1	12	4	4	593
1	(Denmark) LM Racing	2	Ret	DNS	**3**	7	6	Ret	DNS	DNS				**1**	4	Ret	2	1	2	1	3	3	593
2	(Denmark) Massive Motorsport	4	2	2	2	5	7	1	3	1	2	3	3	2	3	1	**3**	3	3	**2**	6	1	533
2	(Denmark) Massive Motorsport	10	8	9	7	8	15	8	5	DSQ	13	9	7	6	6	10	4	17	6	4	9	8	533
3	(Denmark) Brian Madsen Motorsport	3	3	3	4	3	3	4	1	4	4	1	2	8	8	4	6	8	7	6	12	6	430
3	(Denmark) Brian Madsen Motorsport	9	13	8	6	9	16†	5	Ret	5	9	5	5	4	1	13	18	9	8	8	7	11	430
4	(Denmark) Markussen Racing	6	4	6	8	2	4	**2**	4	2	5	4	4	3	2	2	7	2	4	3	1	2	327
5	(Denmark) Insight Racing	5	5	4	5	11	9	13	8	12	3	2	6	7	7	3	8	Ret	9	9	2	5	271
5	(Denmark) Insight Racing	11	9	10	11	18†	Ret	14†	DNS	DNS	8	10	Ret	5	13	Ret	9	10	15	10	5	7	271
6	(Denmark) Meteor Racing	8	6	7	9	4	5	9	6	8	6	13	8	Ret	14	12	13	11	Ret	Ret	18†	12	238
6	(Denmark) Meteor Racing	Ret	10	11	14	13	11	10	10	9	19†	15	11	10	9	5	10	6	11	5	10	9	238
7	(Denmark) Carlsen Motorsport	7	7	5	10	1	2	11	9	7	10	6	9	11	10	Ret	5	5	5	7	8	15	186
8	(Sweden) TPR Motorsport	14	16	14	16	17	12	7	7	6	16	Ret	14	12	15	7	17	15	Ret	14	13	Ret	92
8	(Sweden) TPR Motorsport	WD	WD	WD				12	12	11	DNS	DNS	DNS	Ret	11	6	16	12	Ret	DSQ	DNS	DNS	92
9	(Denmark) Madbull Racing	Ret	15	Ret	12	14	Ret				11	11	10	Ret	12	8	12	7	10				45
10	(Denmark) Larsen Motorsport	13	11	12	15	10	Ret				12	14	12							Ret	16	14	31
11	(Denmark) Højris Motorsport	16†	17	15	13	Ret	13				14	Ret	13	13	17†	9	14	16	13	15	15	Ret	30
12	(Denmark) Miccar Racing	15	18	16	17	16	14	15	11	13	18	17†	DNS	14	16	11	15	13	14	13	17	16†	29
13	(Denmark) Sally Racing										17	16	15										1
Pos.	Driver	DJU			JYL1			COP			JYL2			ARH			JYL3			PDB			Pts.

† – Drivers did not finish the race, but were classified as they completed over 75% of the race distance.

=== Trophy championship ===
Pos.	Driver	DJU			JYL1			COP			JYL2			ARH			JYL3			PDB			Pts.
Pos.	Driver	RD1	RD2	RD3	RD1	RD2	RD3	RD1	RD2	RD3	RD1	RD2	RD3	RD1	RD2	RD3	RD1	RD2	RD3	RD1	RD2	RD3	Pts.
1	(Denmark) Michael Carlsen	7	7	5	10	1	2	11	9	7	10	6	9	11	10	Ret	5	5	5	7	8	15	189
2	(Denmark) René Povlsen	8	6	7	9	4	5	9	10	9	6	13	8	10	9	5	10	6	11	5	10	9	188
3	(Denmark) Kenn Bach	10	8	9	7	8	7	8	5	DSQ	13	9	7	6	6	10	4	17	6	4	9	8	186
4	(Denmark) Johnny Vejlebo	12	12	13	18	12	8	6	Ret	10	15	12	16	8	8	4	18	14	12	16	14	13	105
5	(Denmark) Allan Kristensen	Ret	10	11	14	13	11	10	6	8	19†	15	11	Ret	14	12	13	11	Ret	Ret	18†	12	81
6	(Denmark) Kim Lund Johansen	Ret	15	Ret	12	14	Ret				11	11	10	Ret	12	8	12	7	10				59
7	(Denmark) Carsten Lorenzen	15	18	16	17	16	14	15	11	13	18	17†	DNS	14	16	11	15	13	14	13	17	16†	49
8	(Denmark) Lars Højris	16†	17	15	13	Ret	13				14	Ret	13	13	17†	9	14	16	13	15	15	Ret	45
9	(Sweden) William Nyberg	14	16	14	16	17	12	12	12	11	16	Ret	14	12	15	7	17	15	Ret	14	13	Ret	44
10	(Denmark) Steffen Larsen	13	11	12	15	10	Ret				12	14	12							Ret	16	14	39
Pos.	Driver	DJU			JYL1			COP			JYL2			ARH			JYL3			PDB			Pts.

† – Drivers did not finish the race, but were classified as they completed over 75% of the race distance.

=== Under 23 championship ===
Pos.	Driver	DJU			JYL1			COP			JYL2			ARH			JYL3			PDB			Pts.
Pos.	Driver	RD1	RD2	RD3	RD1	RD2	RD3	RD1	RD2	RD3	RD1	RD2	RD3	RD1	RD2	RD3	RD1	RD2	RD3	RD1	RD2	RD3	Pts.
1	(Denmark) Gustav Birch	9	13	8	6	9	16†	4	Ret	4	9	5	5	9	DSQ	13	6	9	8	8	7	11	214
3	(Norway) Kristian Sætheren	11	9	10	11	11	Ret	13	8	12	8	2	6	7	18	Ret	11	10	9	11	11	10	198
2	(Sweden) William Nyberg	14	16	14	16	17	12	12	12	11	16	Ret	14	12	15	7	17	15	Ret	14	13	Ret	162
Pos.	Driver	DJU			JYL1			COP			JYL2			ARH			JYL3			PDB			Pts.

† – Drivers did not finish the race, but were classified as they completed over 75% of the race distance.
