= 2012 Danish Thundersport Championship =

Seasons
- ← 2010 2013 →

The 2012 Auto-G Danish Thundersport Championship season was the first season of the Danish Thundersport Championship, it began at Jyllandsringen in May and concluded at the same venue in September.

The championship succeeded the Danish Touringcar Championship, with the Super 2000 cars being replaced with the Camaro Cup/Trans Am cars.

Jan Magnussen won the championship, driving for Fukamuni Racing.

== Teams and drivers ==
All teams ran the Chevrolet Camaro.

Team	No.	Drivers	Rounds
(Sweden) Memphis Racing	4	(Denmark) Henrik Jansen	6
(Sweden) Memphis Racing	60	(Denmark) Dennis Lind	All*
(Sweden) Memphis Racing	77	(Denmark) Kasper Aaskov	6
(Denmark) STARK Racing (Note: Car No. 5 entered as STARK Racing and cars No. 8 and 25 are entered as Elgaard Motorsport.) (Denmark) Elgaard Motorsport	5	(Denmark) Casper Elgaard	All*
(Denmark) STARK Racing (Denmark) Elgaard Motorsport	8	(Denmark) Michael Outzen	2
(Denmark) STARK Racing (Denmark) Elgaard Motorsport	8	(Denmark) Kristian Poulsen	1*
(Denmark) STARK Racing (Denmark) Elgaard Motorsport	8	(Denmark) Jesper Sørensen	3–6
(Denmark) STARK Racing (Denmark) Elgaard Motorsport	25	(Denmark) Carsten Andersen	4, 6
(Denmark) STARK Racing (Denmark) Elgaard Motorsport	25	(Denmark) Peter Elgaard	1, 5*
Privateer	21	(Sweden) William Frank	4
(Denmark) Fukamuni Racing	22	(Denmark) Mikkel Mac	All*
(Denmark) Fukamuni Racing	23	(Denmark) Jan Magnussen	1–4, 6
(Denmark) Fukamuni Racing	23	(Denmark) Kevin Magnussen	*
(Denmark) Fukamuni Racing	24	(Denmark) Kim Rødkjær	1–2, 4, 6*
(Denmark) Fukamuni Racing	24	(Denmark) Nicholai Sørensen	3, 5
(Norway) Fjeld Racing	33	(Norway) Fredrik Fjeld	6
(Norway) Fjeld Racing	33	(Norway) Marius Fjeld	4
(Norway) Fjeld Racing	66	(Norway) Marius Fjeld	6
(Sweden) Bryntesson Motorsport	34	(Sweden) Jens Edman	4
(Norway) Sesam Data Motorsport	42	(Norway) Bjarne Nordal	1, 4, 6
(Norway) Sesam Data Motorsport	58	(Norway) Ronny Vestengen	1, 6
(Norway) SEB Power Group	43	(Norway) Marius Nakken	1, 6
(Denmark) Polar Seafood Racing	61	(Denmark) John Nielsen	All*
(Denmark) Polar Seafood Racing	62	(Denmark) Anders Fjordbach	3–6*
(Denmark) Polar Seafood Racing	62	(Denmark) Michael Outzen	1
(Denmark) Polar Seafood Racing	62	(Denmark) Peter Vesti	2

Drivers with an asterisk on their "Rounds" column took part in the non-championship round held at the Copenhagen Historic Grand Prix.

== Calendar ==
All rounds was held in Denmark.

Rnd.		Circuit/Location	Date
1	R1	Jyllandsringen, Silkeborg	27 May
1	R2	Jyllandsringen, Silkeborg	27 May
2	R1	Padborg Park, Padborg	10 June
2	R2	Padborg Park, Padborg	10 June
3	R1	Padborg Park, Padborg	1 July
3	R2	Padborg Park, Padborg	1 July
*	R1	Copenhagen Historic Grand Prix, Copenhagen	5 August
*	R2	Copenhagen Historic Grand Prix, Copenhagen	5 August
4	R1	Jyllandsringen, Silkeborg	26 August
4	R2	Jyllandsringen, Silkeborg	26 August
5	R1	Ring Djursland, Pederstrup	16 September
5	R2	Ring Djursland, Pederstrup	16 September
6	R1	Jyllandsringen, Silkeborg	30 September
6	R2	Jyllandsringen, Silkeborg	30 September

== Results ==
Rnd.		Circuit	Pole position	Fastest lap	Winning driver	Winning team
1	R1	Jyllandsringen	(Denmark) Jan Magnussen	(Denmark) Jan Magnussen	(Denmark) Jan Magnussen	(Denmark) Fukamuni Racing
1	R2	Jyllandsringen		(Denmark) Jan Magnussen	(Denmark) Jan Magnussen	(Denmark) Fukamuni Racing
2	R1	Padborg Park	(Denmark) Mikkel Mac	(Denmark) Mikkel Mac	(Denmark) John Nielsen	(Denmark) Polar Seafood Racing
2	R2	Padborg Park		(Denmark) Mikkel Mac	(Denmark) Mikkel Mac	(Denmark) Fukamuni Racing
3	R1	Padborg Park	(Denmark) Jan Magnussen	(Denmark) Jan Magnussen	(Denmark) Jan Magnussen	(Denmark) Fukamuni Racing
3	R2	Padborg Park		(Denmark) Jan Magnussen	(Denmark) Jan Magnussen	(Denmark) Fukamuni Racing
NC	R1	Copenhagen Historic Grand Prix			(Denmark) Mikkel Mac	(Denmark) Fukamuni Racing
NC	R2	Copenhagen Historic Grand Prix			(Denmark) Kevin Magnussen	(Denmark) Fukamuni Racing
4	R1	Jyllandsringen	(Denmark) John Nielsen	(Denmark) John Nielsen	(Denmark) Jan Magnussen	(Denmark) Fukamuni Racing
4	R2	Jyllandsringen		(Denmark) John Nielsen	(Denmark) John Nielsen	(Denmark) Polar Seafood Racing
5	R1	Ring Djursland	(Denmark) Mikkel Mac	(Denmark) Mikkel Mac	(Denmark) Mikkel Mac	(Denmark) Fukamuni Racing
5	R2	Ring Djursland		(Denmark) John Nielsen	(Denmark) John Nielsen	(Denmark) Polar Seafood Racing
6	R1	Jyllandsringen	(Denmark) John Nielsen	(Denmark) John Nielsen	(Denmark) Dennis Lind	(Sweden) Memphis Racing
6	R2	Jyllandsringen		(Denmark) Dennis Lind	(Denmark) Dennis Lind	(Sweden) Memphis Racing

== Championship standings ==
Points are awarded to the top 15 classified finishers in each race. No points are awarded for pole position or fastest lap.

Position	**1st**	**2nd**	**3rd**	**4th**	**5th**	**6th**	**7th**	**8th**	**9th**	**10th**	**11th**	**12th**	**13th**	**14th**	**15th**
Points	20	17	15	13	11	10	9	8	7	6	5	4	3	2	1

=== Drivers' standings ===
Pos	Driver	JYL1		PAD1		PAD2		CHGP‡		JYL2		DJU		JYL3		Total	Drop	Pts
1	(Denmark) Jan Magnussen	**1**	1	5	2	**1**	1			1	5			3	5	165		165
2	(Denmark) Dennis Lind	4	2	2	4	4	3	DNS	DNS	3	4	Ret	2	1	1	173	13	160
3	(Denmark) John Nielsen	6	11†	1	5	3	4	4	4	**2**	1	Ret	1	**2**	3	163	5	158
4	(Denmark) Casper Elgaard	2	3	3	6	2	2	3	2	4	2	3	3	8	2	176	18	158
5	(Denmark) Mikkel Mac	5	5	**8†**	1	5	6	1	3	5	6	**1**	4	4	4	151	18	133
6	(Denmark) Anders Fjordbach					6	7	5	DNS	6	8	5	5	5	8	78		78
7	(Denmark) Kim Rødkjær	7	9	6	7			DSQ	6	7	11			7	6	68		68
8	(Denmark) Jesper Sørensen					8	8			12	10	6	8	10	12	54		54
9	(Denmark) Nicholai Sørensen					7	5					2	6			47		47
10	(Denmark) Michael Outzen	DNS	6	4	3											38		38
11	(Norway) Bjarne Nordal	9	10							10	9			15	13	30		30
12	(Norway) Ronny Vestengen	8	8											9	10	29		29
13	(Denmark) Kristian Poulsen	3	4					2	5							28		28
14	(Norway) Marius Nakken	Ret	7											6	8	26		26
15	(Sweden) Jens Edman									8	3					23		23
16	(Denmark) Peter Elgaard	DNS	DNS					DNS	DNS			4	7			22		22
17	(Denmark) Peter Vesti			7	8											17		17
18	(Norway) Marius Fjeld									9	7					16		16
19	(Denmark) Carsten Andersen									11	13†			12	14	14		14
20	(Norway) Fredrik Fjeld													14	7	11		11
21	(Denmark) Kasper Aaskov													13	11	8		8
22	(Denmark) Henrik Jansen													11	DNS	5		5
23	(Sweden) William Frank									Ret	12					4		4
24	(Denmark) Kevin Magnussen							DNS	1							0		0
Pos	Driver	JYL1		PAD1		PAD2		CHGP‡		JYL2		DJU		JYL3		Total	Drop	Pts

Colour	Result
Gold	Winner
Silver	Second place
Bronze	Third place
Green	Points classification
Blue	Non-points classification
Blue	Non-classified finish (NC)
Purple	Retired, not classified (Ret)
Red	Did not qualify (DNQ)
Red	Did not pre-qualify (DNPQ)
Black	Disqualified (DSQ)
White	Did not start (DNS)
White	Withdrew (WD)
White	Race cancelled (C)
Blank	Did not practice (DNP)
Blank	Did not arrive (DNA)
Blank	Excluded (EX)

**Bold** – Pole
Italics – Fastest Lap

Notes:

- † — Driver retired, but was classified as they completed 90% of the race distance.
- ‡ — No points are awarded for the non-championship round held at the Copenhagen Historic Grand Prix.
