= 2020 TCR Denmark Touring Car Series =

Touring car series in Denmark

The 2020 TCR Denmark Touring Car Series (known for sponsorship reasons as the 2020 HC Container TCR Denmark Touring Car Series) was the inaugural season of the TCR Denmark Touring Car Series. The season started on the 18/19 April at Jyllandsringen and concluded on the 10/11 October at Padborg Park.

== Calendar ==
Five events were set to take place in Denmark. Two of the former rounds were scheduled to be supporting the STCC TCR Scandinavia Touring Car Championship.

Each round consisted of three 15-minute and 1-lap races, the starting order for the first race was based on the results from qualifying while the second race utilised a reversed grid of the top eight cars from qualifying. The third and final race had its grid decided by the most points gathered from the first two races.

The 2020 calendar was announced on 17 December 2019 with the addition of a round supporting the Copenhagen Historic Grand Prix announced on 19 February 2020.

The opening round of the season was then moved to 2–3 May 2020 due to the COVID-19 pandemic. Round 2 of the championship, that was due to take place in Aarhus, supporting the Classic Race Aarhus event, was postponed due to the COVID-19 pandemic until 2021.

On 1 May 2020, a new, preliminary, calendar was released featuring a double header round at Jyllandsringen.

Round	Race	Circuit	Location	Date	Supporting
1	1	Jyllandsringen	Silkeborg	20–21 June	F4 Danish Championship; Yokohama Supercup; Yokohama 1600 Challenge; Legend Car Cup
1	2	Jyllandsringen	Silkeborg	20–21 June	F4 Danish Championship; Yokohama Supercup; Yokohama 1600 Challenge; Legend Car Cup
1	3	Jyllandsringen	Silkeborg	20–21 June	F4 Danish Championship; Yokohama Supercup; Yokohama 1600 Challenge; Legend Car Cup
2	4	Jyllandsringen	Silkeborg	5–6 September	
2	5	Jyllandsringen	Silkeborg	5–6 September	
2	6	Jyllandsringen	Silkeborg	5–6 September	
2	7	Jyllandsringen	Silkeborg	5–6 September	
2	8	Jyllandsringen	Silkeborg	5–6 September	
3	9	Ring Djursland	Ballerup	26–27 September	F4 Danish Championship
3	10	Ring Djursland	Ballerup	26–27 September	F4 Danish Championship
3	11	Ring Djursland	Ballerup	26–27 September	F4 Danish Championship
4	12	Padborg Park	Padborg	10–11 October	F4 Danish Championship
4	13	Padborg Park	Padborg	10–11 October	F4 Danish Championship
4	14	Padborg Park	Padborg	10–11 October	F4 Danish Championship
5	15	Jyllandsringen	Silkeborg	23–25 October	F4 Danish Championship
5	16	Jyllandsringen	Silkeborg	23–25 October	F4 Danish Championship
5	17	Jyllandsringen	Silkeborg	23–25 October	F4 Danish Championship

== Test days ==
The official test days for the season were announced on 16 January 2020. The announced dates were the 1, 2 and 16 April at Jyllandsringen. These also served as the series' media days for photos and interviews for the drivers and team to take place. These were later postponed to 9–10 June.

== Teams and drivers ==
Team	Car	No.	Drivers	Class	Rounds	Ref.
(Denmark) Carlsen Motorsport	Peugeot 308 TCR	4	(Denmark) Michael Carlsen	DSG	All	
(Denmark) Insight Racing	Peugeot 308 TCR	5	(Denmark) Johnny Vejlebo	DSG	All	
(Denmark) Insight Racing	Alfa Romeo Giulietta TCR	9	(Denmark) Jacob Mathiassen		All	
(Denmark) Insight Racing	Alfa Romeo Giulietta Veloce TCR	10	(Norway) Kristian Sætheren	A	1, 5	
(Denmark) Massive Motorsport	Honda Civic Type R TCR (FK8)	6	(Denmark) Kasper Jensen		All	
(Denmark) Massive Motorsport	Honda Civic Type R TCR (FK8)	88	(Denmark) Kenn Bach	DSG	All	
(Denmark) Madbull Racing	CUPRA León TCR	7	(Denmark) Kim Lund	DSG	All	
(Denmark) Meteor Racing	Volkswagen Golf GTI TCR	8	(Denmark) Allan Kristensen	DSG	1–2, 5	
(Denmark) Meteor Racing	Volkswagen Golf GTI TCR	41	(Denmark) René Povlsen	DSG	All	
(Denmark) LM Racing	Volkswagen Golf GTI TCR	11	(Denmark) Nicolai Sylvest	A	All	
(Denmark) LM Racing	Volkswagen Golf GTI TCR	23	(Denmark) Jan Magnussen		All	
(Denmark) Team Sally Racing	CUPRA León TCR	12	(Denmark) Peter Obel		5	
(Sweden) TPR Motorsport	Honda Civic Type R TCR (FK8)	16	(Denmark) Casper Elgaard		2–3, 5	
(Denmark) Markussen Racing	Peugeot 308 TCR	18	(Denmark) Michael Markussen		All	
Peugeot Sport Denmark	Peugeot 308 TCR	32	(Denmark) Michelle Gatting		1	
(Denmark) Andersen Motorsport	Hyundai i30 N TCR	19	(Denmark) Martin Andersen		All	
(Denmark) Lindhard Motorsport	Volkswagen Golf GTI TCR	67	(Denmark) Jonas Lindhard	DSG A	All	

Icon	Class
DSG	Cars with DSG Gearboxes
A	Am/U23/Drivers below 23

=== Summary ===
- LM Racing, run by Lars Mogensen, will compete in the championship using two Volkswagen Golf GTI TCR cars for ex-Formula One and Corvette Racing driver Jan Magnussen and 2019 ADAC GT Masters driver Nicolai Sylvest.
- Massive Motorsport will compete in the championship entering DS3 Cup Denmark driver Kenn Bach and Three-time Danish Thundersport Championship winner Kasper Jensen. Casper Elgaard, who was originally scheduled to enter the series with the team, announced on 28 January that he has left the team. Bach will drive an FK8 Honda Civic Type R previously driven by Josh Files for KCMG while Jensen's car is not yet confirmed.
- A pair of ex-Kristoffersson Motorsport Volkswagen Golf GTI TCRs will be entered by 2019 Yokohama SuperCup Denmark champion Rene Povlsen and runner-up Allan Kristensen. The team for which the two drivers will compete is yet to be confirmed.
- Insight Racing will enter an Alfa Romeo Giulietta Veloce TCR for Norwegian driver Kristian Sætheren, who competed in the 2019 TCR Scandinavia Series for the team and an Alfa Romeo Giulietta TCR for British GT driver Jacob Mathiassen. Johnny Vejlebo will also compete in the championship for Insight in a Peugeot 308 TCR, driving in the Trofeo Championship.
- TPR Motorsport will compete in the championship using a Volkswagen Golf GTI TCR with 2019 Danish Thundersport Championship driver and team owner Toni Persic driving the car. Casper Elgaard was later confirmed to drive for team after leaving Massive Motorsport, alongside Daniel Träger in a pair of Honda Civic Type R TCR cars.
- Two-time Danish Touringcar Champion Michael Carlsen will compete in the championship in a Peugeot 308 TCR.
- Danish Yokohama Super Cup driver Mikael Kildevæld will compete in the championship in a Volkswagen Golf GTI TCR for his team, Kildevæld Racing.
- Danish Thundersport Championship driver Michael Markussen will compete in the championship in a Peugeot 308 TCR for his team, Markussen Racing. Michelle Gatting will guest star alongside Markussen in the opening round.
- Kim Lund will compete in the championship in an ex-PWR CUPRA León TCR driving in the Trophy Championship for Madbull Racing.
- Jonas Lindhard will compete in the championship in a Volkswagen Golf GTI TCR driving for his family team, Lindhard Motorsport.
- Martin Andersen will compete in the championship in a Hyundai i30 N TCR driving for his own team, Andersen Motorsport.

== Results and standings ==
Rnd.		Circuit	Pole position	Fastest lap	Winning driver	Winning team	DSG winner	U23 winner	Info
1	R1	Jyllandsringen	(Denmark) Kasper Jensen	(Denmark) Kasper Jensen	(Denmark) Kasper Jensen	(Denmark) Massive Motorsport	(Denmark) René Povlsen	(Denmark) Nicolai Sylvest	
1	R2	Jyllandsringen	**No dispute**	(Denmark) Nicolai Sylvest	(Denmark) Nicolai Sylvest	(Denmark) LM Racing	(Denmark) René Povlsen	(Denmark) Nicolai Sylvest	
1	R3	Jyllandsringen	**No dispute**	(Denmark) Nicolai Sylvest	(Denmark) Kasper Jensen	(Denmark) Massive Motorsport	(Denmark) René Povlsen	(Denmark) Nicolai Sylvest	
2	R1	Jyllandsringen	**No dispute**	(Denmark) Casper Elgaard^{1}		(Sweden) TPR Motorsport	(Denmark) Michael Carlsen	(Denmark) Nicolai Sylvest	
2	R2	Jyllandsringen	(Denmark) Casper Elgaard^{1}	(Denmark) Martin Andersen	(Denmark) Casper Elgaard	(Sweden) TPR Motorsport	(Denmark) Michael Carlsen	(Denmark) Nicolai Sylvest	
2	R3	Jyllandsringen	**No dispute**	(Denmark) Martin Andersen	(Denmark) Martin Andersen	(Denmark) Andersen Motorsport	(Denmark) René Povlsen	(Denmark) Nicolai Sylvest	
2	R4	Jyllandsringen	(Denmark) Jan Magnussen	(Denmark) Kasper Jensen	(Denmark) Casper Elgaard	(Sweden) TPR Motorsport	(Denmark) Kenn Bach	(Denmark) Nicolai Sylvest	
2	R5	Jyllandsringen	**No dispute**	(Denmark) Jacob Mathiassen	(Denmark) Jacob Mathiassen	(Denmark) Insight Racing	(Denmark) René Povlsen	(Denmark) Nicolai Sylvest	
2	R6	Jyllandsringen	**No dispute**	(Denmark) Casper Elgaard	(Denmark) Casper Elgaard	(Sweden) TPR Motorsport	(Denmark) Johnny Vejlebo	(Denmark) Nicolai Sylvest	
3	R1	Ring Djursland	**No dispute**	(Denmark) Jan Magnussen^{2}		(Denmark) LM Racing	(Denmark) Michael Carlsen	(Denmark) Nicolai Sylvest	
3	R2	Ring Djursland	(Denmark) Jan Magnussen	(Denmark) Martin Andersen	(Denmark) Martin Andersen	(Denmark) Andersen Motorsport	(Denmark) Michael Carlsen	(Denmark) Nicolai Sylvest	
3	R3	Ring Djursland	**No dispute**	(Denmark) Nicolai Sylvest	(Denmark) Jan Magnussen	(Denmark) LM Racing	(Denmark) Kim Lund	(Denmark) Nicolai Sylvest	
–	R1	Padborg Park	Event cancelled						
–	R2	Padborg Park	Event cancelled						
–	R3	Padborg Park	Event cancelled						
4	R1	Jyllandsringen	(Denmark) Kasper Jensen	(Denmark) Kasper Jensen	(Denmark) Kasper Jensen	(Denmark) Massive Motorsport	(Denmark) Michael Carlsen	(Denmark) Nicolai Sylvest	
4	R2	Jyllandsringen	**No dispute**	(Denmark) Casper Elgaard	(Denmark) Jacob Mathiassen	(Denmark) Insight Racing	(Denmark) Allan Kristensen	(Norway) Kristian Sætheren	
4	R3	Jyllandsringen	**No dispute**	(Denmark) Kasper Jensen	(Denmark) Kasper Jensen	(Denmark) Massive Motorsport	(Denmark) Michael Carlsen	(Denmark) Nicolai Sylvest	

^{1} – Original race 1 was replaced by a qualifying session for the then Race 1, and normal points were awarded.

^{2} – Original race 1 was replaced by a qualifying session for the then Race 1, and normal points were awarded.

Scoring system

Position	**1st**	**2nd**	**3rd**	**4th**	**5th**	**6th**	**7th**	**8th**	**9th**	**10th**	**11th**	**12th**	**13th**	**14th**	**15th**	**16th**	**17th**
Race	25	20	17	15	13	12	11	10	9	8	7	6	5	4	3	2	1

=== Drivers' championship ===
Pos.	Driver	JYL1			JYL2						DJU			JYL3			Pts.
Pos.	Driver	RD1	RD2	RD3	RD1	RD2	RD3	RD4	RD5	RD6	RD1	RD2	RD3	RD1	RD2	RD3	Pts.
1	(Denmark) Kasper Jensen	**1**	3	**1**	2	2	4	3	3	2	6	3	2	1	4	1	290
2	(Denmark) Martin Andersen	2	6	4	3	3	1	4	11	5	2	1	4	7	2	5	245
3	(Denmark) Nicolai Sylvest	5	1	2	5	6	3	6	4	6	4	4	3	2	8	4	231
4	(Denmark) Jan Magnussen	3	4	NC	7	Ret	5	**2**	Ret	4	**1**	2	1	3	3	2	215
5	(Denmark) Jacob Mathiassen	7	**2**	3	4	4	7	7	1	13	3	12	DNS	6	1	8	200
6	(Denmark) Michael Markussen	4	5	5	8	5	2	5	2	3	5	5	10	4	5	Ret	195
7	(Denmark) Casper Elgaard				1	**1**	8	1	5	1	7	Ret	Ret	15	6	3	167
8	(Denmark) René Povlsen	8	7	7	10	8	9	Ret	6	8	9	11	9	16	12	9	124
9	(Denmark) Michael Carlsen	13	9	8	6	DSQ	12	11	10	11	8	6	6	8	13	7	124
10	(Denmark) Kenn Bach	10	Ret	10†	11	7	6	8	Ret	10	11	8	7	11	15	DNS	102
11	(Denmark) Jonas Lindhard	12	11	9	9	11	13	12	7	12	10	9	8	10	14	DNS	100
12	(Denmark) Johnny Vejlebo	14†	Ret	DNS	12	10	10	9	8	7	13	10	DSQ	9	11	11	100
13	(Denmark) Allan Kristensen	9	Ret	DNS	14	9	11	10	9	9				13	9	10	78
14	(Norway) Kristian Sætheren	6	8	6										5	7	6	70
15	(Denmark) Kim Lund Johansen	11	10	Ret	13	DNS	DNS	DNS	DNS	DNS	12	7	5	14	10	Ret	63
16	(Denmark) Michelle Gatting	15†	Ret	DNS													3
-	(Denmark) Peter Obel													12	16	12	-
Pos.	Driver	JYL1			JYL2						DJU			JYL3			Pts.

Colour	Result
Gold	Winner
Silver	Second place
Bronze	Third place
Green	Points classification
Blue	Non-points classification
Blue	Non-classified finish (NC)
Purple	Retired, not classified (Ret)
Red	Did not qualify (DNQ)
Red	Did not pre-qualify (DNPQ)
Black	Disqualified (DSQ)
White	Did not start (DNS)
White	Withdrew (WD)
White	Race cancelled (C)
Blank	Did not practice (DNP)
Blank	Did not arrive (DNA)
Blank	Excluded (EX)

**Bold** – Pole
Italics – Fastest Lap

† – Drivers did not finish the race, but were classified as they completed over 75% of the race distance.

=== Teams' championship ===
Pos.	Team	JYL1			JYL2						DJU			JYL3			Pts.
Pos.	Team	RD1	RD2	RD3	RD1	RD2	RD3	RD4	RD5	RD6	RD1	RD2	RD3	RD1	RD2	RD3	Pts.
1	(Denmark) LM Racing	5	1	2	5	6	3	6	4	6	4	4	3	2	8	4	446
1	(Denmark) LM Racing	3	4	NC	7	Ret	5	**2**	Ret	4	**1**	2	1	3	3	2	446
2	(Denmark) Massive Motorsport	**1**	3	**1**	2	2	4	3	3	2	6	3	2	1	4	1	392
2	(Denmark) Massive Motorsport	10	Ret	10†	11	7	6	8	Ret	10	11	8	7	11	15	DNS	392
3	(Denmark) Insight Racing	7	**2**	3	4	4	7	7	1	13	3	12	DNS	6	1	8	362
3	(Denmark) Insight Racing	6	8	6										5	7	6	362
3	(Denmark) Insight Racing	14†	Ret	DNS	12	10	10	9	8	7	13	10	DSQ	9	11	11	362
4	(Denmark) Andersen Motorsport	2	6	4	3	3	1	4	11	5	2	1	4	7	2	5	245
5	(Denmark) Meteor Racing	8	7	7	10	8	9	Ret	6	8	9	11	9	16	12	9	200
5	(Denmark) Meteor Racing	9	Ret	DNS	14	9	11	10	9	9				13	9	10	200
6	(Denmark) Markussen Racing	4	5	5	8	5	2	5	2	3	5	5	10	4	5	Ret	196
7	(Sweden) TPR Motorsport				1	**1**	8	1	5	1	7	Ret	Ret	15	6	3	167
8	(Denmark) Carlsen Motorsport	13	9	8	6	DSQ	12	11	10	11	8	6	6	8	13	7	124
9	(Denmark) Lindhard Motorsport	12	11	9	9	11	13	12	7	12	10	9	8	10	14	DNS	100
10	(Denmark) Madbull Racing	11	10	Ret	13	DNS	DNS	DNS	DNS	DNS	12	7	5	14	10	Ret	63
11	(Denmark) Team Sally Racing													12	16	12	14
12	Peugeot Sport Denmark	15†	Ret	DNS													3
Pos.	Driver	JYL1			JYL2						DJU			JYL3			Pts.

† – Drivers did not finish the race, but were classified as they completed over 75% of the race distance.
