= TCR Denmark Touring Car Series =

Touring car series based in Denmark

- Category: Touring cars
- Country: Denmark
- Inaugural season: 2020
- Folded: 2025
- Last Drivers' champion: (Denmark) Malte Ebdrup
- Last Teams' champion: (Denmark) Mascot Motorsport
- Official website: https://www.tcr-denmark.com/

The TCR Denmark Touring Car Series was a touring car racing series based in Denmark. It began in 2020 and folded following the 2025 season due to the promoter stepping down.

== Background ==
The TCR Touring Car formula is recognised as a popular and affordable type of series in motorsport. The TCR Denmark Touring Car Championship provides opportunities for Danish drivers and a way for national drivers to move up to larger TCR international series among professional drivers.

Martin Jensen, who entered in the Danish round of the 2019 TCR Scandinavia Touring Car Championship at Jyllands-Ringen, will act as the CEO for the series. Jensen stated that "Our aim was presenting the best of Touring Car racing to the Danish fans at all the Danish racetracks".

The series will also re-introduce Touring car racing to Denmark for the first time since the Danish Touringcar Championship, which folded in 2010 to create the Scandinavian Touring Car Championship.

== 2020 season ==
Within the first two weeks of the series' announcement, six confirmed entries had already been made, and two drivers; ex-Formula One and Corvette Racing driver Jan Magnussen and quadruple Danish Touringcar Champion Casper Elgaard. 2019 ADAC GT Masters race winner Nicolai Sylvest will join Magnussen. Norwegian TCR Scandinavia driver Kristian Sætheren will pilot an Alfa Romeo Giulietta Veloce TCR for Insight Racing.

The calendar for the 2020 season was announced on 17 December 2019, confirming six rounds, three at Jyllandsringen, one in Aarhus which is the site of the annual Classic Race Aarhus, one at Ring Djursland and the final round taking place at Padborg Park.

One round of the season is scheduled to be supporting the Danish round of the STCC TCR Scandinavia Touring Car Championship at Bellahøj Park in Copenhagen.

The official test days for the season were announced on 16 January 2020. The announced dates were the 1st, 2nd and 16th of April at Jyllandsringen. These will also serve as the series' media days for photos and interviews for the drivers and team to take place.

A new calendar was released on 1 May 2020 featuring 18 races as well as a six-race double header at Jyllandsringen. 16 Cars were entered for the first round.

== Media coverage ==
On 12 June 2020, it was announced that Discovery Networks Denmark would broadcast all the rounds of the 2020 TCR Denmark season.

== Champions ==
Year	Driver	Car
2020	(Denmark) Kasper H. Jensen	Honda Civic Type R TCR (FK8)
2021	(Denmark) Kasper H. Jensen	Honda Civic Type R TCR (FK8)
2022	(Denmark) Kasper H. Jensen	Honda Civic Type R TCR (FK8)
2023	(Denmark) Kasper H. Jensen	Honda Civic Type R TCR (FK8)
2024	(Denmark) Kasper H. Jensen	Honda Civic Type R TCR (FL5)
2025	(Denmark) Malte Ebdrup	Honda Civic Type R TCR (FL5)
