= 2022 TCR Denmark Touring Car Series =

Car racing competition

The 2022 TCR Denmark Touring Car Series was the third season of the TCR Denmark Touring Car Series.

== Teams and drivers ==
Team	Car	No.	Drivers	Class	Rounds	Ref.
(Denmark) Carlsen Motorsport	Peugeot 308 TCR	4	(Denmark) Michael Carlsen		5	
(Denmark) Brian Madsen Motorsport	Peugeot 308 TCR	5	(Denmark) Johnny Vejlebo	T	1–4	
(Denmark) GMB Motorsport	Honda Civic Type R TCR (FK8)	6	(Denmark) Kasper Jensen		All	
(Denmark) GMB Motorsport	Honda Civic Type R TCR (FK8)	44	(Denmark) Gustav Birch	U	All	
(Denmark) Madbull Racing	Honda Civic Type R TCR (FK8)	7	(Denmark) Kim Lund Johansen	T	1, 3, 5	
(Denmark) Meteor Racing	Audi RS 3 LMS TCR (2021)	8	(Denmark) Allan Kristensen	T	All	
(Denmark) Meteor Racing	Audi RS 3 LMS TCR (2021)	41	(Denmark) René Povlsen	T	All	
(Denmark) Insight Racing	Alfa Romeo Giulietta Veloce TCR	9	(Denmark) Jacob Mathiassen		All	
(Denmark) Insight Racing	Alfa Romeo Giulietta Veloce TCR	10	(Norway) Kristian Sætheren	U	1–4, 7	
(Denmark) Insight Racing	Alfa Romeo Giulietta Veloce TCR	169	(Denmark) Kim König	T	1–3, 5, 7	
(Denmark) Green Development	CUPRA León Competición TCR	11	(Denmark) Nicolai Sylvest	U	All	
(Sweden) Team Auto Lounge Racing	Audi RS 3 LMS TCR (2021)	13	(Sweden) Christian Skaar	T	7	
(Sweden) Team Auto Lounge Racing	Audi RS 3 LMS TCR (2021)	14	(Sweden) Kevin Engman		7	
(Denmark) Markussen Racing	CUPRA León Competición TCR	18	(Denmark) Michael Markussen		All	
(Denmark) Larsen Motorsport	Peugeot 308 TCR	20	(Denmark) Steffen Larsen	T	1–3, 5, 7	
(Sweden) TPR Motorsport	Honda Civic Type R TCR (FK8)	21	(Sweden) Anton Bergström	U	All	
(Sweden) TPR Motorsport	Honda Civic Type R TCR (FK8)	53	(Germany) Michelle Halder		7	
(Sweden) TPR Motorsport	Honda Civic Type R TCR (FK8)	77	(Germany) Mike Halder		All	
(Denmark) Outzen Motorsport	Hyundai i30 N TCR	22	(Denmark) Philip Lindberg	U	All	
(Denmark) Hartmann Racing	Alfa Romeo Giulietta Veloce TCR	31	(Denmark) Hans Hartmann	T	1–3, 5, 7	
(Denmark) LM Racing	CUPRA León Competición TCR	33	(Denmark) Lars Højris	T	All	
(Denmark) LM Racing	CUPRA León Competición TCR	88	(Denmark) Kenn Bach	T	All	
(Denmark) Budweg Racing	Honda Civic Type R TCR (FK2)	71	(Denmark) Carsten Lorenzen	T	1–6	

Icon	Class
T	Trophy
U	U25/Drivers below 25

== Calendar and results ==
The 2022 calendar was introduced on November 29, 2021.

Rnd.		Circuit	Date	Pole position	Fastest lap	Winning driver	Winning team	Trophy winner	U23 winner
1	R1	Padborg Park	8 May	(Denmark) Kasper Jensen	(Denmark) Kasper Jensen	(Denmark) Kasper Jensen	(Denmark) GMB Motorsport	(Denmark) René Povlsen	(Denmark) Nicolai Sylvest
1	R2	Padborg Park	8 May		(Denmark) Gustav Birch	(Denmark) Gustav Birch	(Denmark) GMB Motorsport	(Denmark) Allan Kristensen	(Denmark) Gustav Birch
1	R3	Padborg Park	8 May		(Germany) Mike Halder	(Denmark) Kasper Jensen	(Denmark) GMB Motorsport	(Denmark) René Povlsen	(Denmark) Gustav Birch
2	R4	Ring Djursland	29 May	(Denmark) Nicolai Sylvest	(Denmark) Nicolai Sylvest	(Denmark) Nicolai Sylvest	(Denmark) Green Development	(Denmark) René Povlsen	(Denmark) Nicolai Sylvest
2	R5	Ring Djursland	29 May		(Denmark) Kasper Jensen	(Denmark) Kasper Jensen	(Denmark) GMB Motorsport	(Denmark) Steffen Larsen	(Norway) Kristian Sætheren
2	R6	Ring Djursland	29 May		(Denmark) Kasper Jensen	(Denmark) Kasper Jensen	(Denmark) GMB Motorsport	(Denmark) René Povlsen	(Denmark) Nicolai Sylvest
3	R7	Jyllandsringen	26 June	(Germany) Mike Halder	(Germany) Mike Halder	(Germany) Mike Halder	(Sweden) TPR Motorsport	(Denmark) Kenn Bach	(Denmark) Nicolai Sylvest
3	R8	Jyllandsringen	26 June		(Germany) Mike Halder	(Germany) Mike Halder	(Sweden) TPR Motorsport	(Denmark) René Povlsen	(Denmark) Philip Lindberg
3	R9	Jyllandsringen	26 June		(Denmark) Kasper Jensen	(Denmark) Kasper Jensen	(Denmark) GMB Motorsport	(Denmark) Kenn Bach	(Denmark) Philip Lindberg
4	R10	Copenhagen	7 August	(Germany) Mike Halder	(Germany) Mike Halder	(Germany) Mike Halder	(Sweden) TPR Motorsport	(Denmark) Kenn Bach	(Denmark) Nicolai Sylvest
4	R11	Copenhagen	7 August		(Denmark) Nicolai Sylvest	(Denmark) Nicolai Sylvest	(Denmark) Green Development	(Denmark) Kenn Bach	(Denmark) Nicolai Sylvest
4	R12	Copenhagen	7 August		(Denmark) Nicolai Sylvest	(Denmark) Nicolai Sylvest	(Denmark) Green Development	(Denmark) Johnny Vejlebo	(Denmark) Nicolai Sylvest
5	R13	Jyllandsringen	27 August	(Denmark) Kasper Jensen	(Germany) Mike Halder	(Germany) Mike Halder	(Sweden) TPR Motorsport	(Denmark) Kenn Bach	(Denmark) Gustav Birch
5	R14	Jyllandsringen	27 August		(Denmark) Kasper Jensen	(Denmark) Nicolai Sylvest	(Denmark) Green Development	(Denmark) Kenn Bach	(Denmark) Nicolai Sylvest
5	R15	Jyllandsringen	27 August		(Denmark) Kasper Jensen	(Germany) Mike Halder	(Sweden) TPR Motorsport	(Denmark) René Povlsen	(Denmark) Gustav Birch
6	R16	Padborg Park	10 September	(Denmark) Kasper Jensen	(Denmark) Kasper Jensen	(Denmark) Kasper Jensen	(Denmark) GMB Motorsport	(Denmark) René Povlsen	(Denmark) Nicolai Sylvest
6	R17	Padborg Park	10 September		(Denmark) Nicolai Sylvest	(Denmark) Nicolai Sylvest	(Denmark) Green Development	(Denmark) René Povlsen	(Denmark) Nicolai Sylvest
6	R18	Padborg Park	10 September		(Germany) Mike Halder	(Denmark) Kasper Jensen	(Denmark) GMB Motorsport	(Denmark) René Povlsen	(Denmark) Nicolai Sylvest
7	R19	Jyllandsringen	9 October	(Germany) Mike Halder	(Germany) Mike Halder	(Germany) Mike Halder	(Sweden) TPR Motorsport	(Denmark) René Povlsen	(Denmark) Nicolai Sylvest
7	R20	Jyllandsringen	9 October		(Denmark) Kasper Jensen	(Denmark) Michael Markussen	(Denmark) Markussen Racing	(Denmark) Allan Kristensen	(Sweden) Anton Bergström
7	R21	Jyllandsringen	9 October		(Germany) Mike Halder	(Germany) Mike Halder	(Sweden) TPR Motorsport	(Denmark) Kenn Bach	(Denmark) Nicolai Sylvest

== Championship Standings ==
Scoring system

Position	**1st**	**2nd**	**3rd**	**4th**	**5th**	**6th**	**7th**	**8th**	**9th**	**10th**	**11th**	**12th**	**13th**	**14th**	**15th**	Fastest lap
Race	25	21	18	16	14	12	10	8	7	6	5	4	3	2	1	2

=== Drivers' Championship ===
Pos.	Driver	PDB1			DJU			JYL1			COP			JYL2			PDB2			JYL3			Pts.
Pos.	Driver	RD1	RD2	RD3	RD1	RD2	RD3	RD1	RD2	RD3	RD1	RD2	RD3	RD1	RD2	RD3	RD1	RD2	RD3	RD1	RD2	RD3	Pts.
1	(Denmark) Kasper Jensen	**1**	6	1	5	1	1	2	3	1	2	2	2	**DSQ**	4	2	**1**	6	1	2	3	2	428
2	(Germany) Mike Halder	3	2	10	6	3	5	**1**	1	4	**1**	3	3	1	2	1	2	12	3	**1**	2	1	417
3	(Denmark) Nicolai Sylvest	4	5	3	**1**	7	2	3	6	5	3	1	1	4	1	4	4	1	2	3	7	4	387
4	(Denmark) Jacob Mathiassen	5	3	4	2	6	3	6	5	8	5	5	7	5	6	5	6	3	5	5	6	5	295
5	(Denmark) Gustav Birch	9	1	2	11	10	9	5	9	3	4	4	4	2	7	3	3	7	6	4	10	7	281
6	(Denmark) Michael Markussen	2	10	6	3	8	6	4	7	13	Ret	6	6	3	Ret	Ret	5	4	4	10	1	3	243
7	(Denmark) René Povlsen	6	16	5	4	5	4	10	4	7	10	10	10	13	11	6	8	2	7	8	9	9	202
8	(Denmark) Philip Lindberg	12	9	12	Ret	DNS	DNS	7	2	2	6	8	5	8	3	12	13	5	9	6	Ret	10	173
9	(Sweden) Anton Bergström	11	12	7	7	12	15	11	13	10	7	Ret	9	6	8	7	7	10	8	7	5	8	150
10	(Denmark) Kenn Bach	7	7	17	17	Ret	11	8	14	6	8	7	12	7	5	11	10	9	10	12	12	6	142
11	(Denmark) Allan Kristensen	8	4	9	12	11	8	14	10	9	12	9	11	9	10	9	9	8	12	11	8	11	135
12	(Denmark) Lars Højris	16	Ret	DNS	14	14	10	12	11	12	9	13	DNS	10	9	8	11	13	11	16	14	12	73
13	(Denmark) Johnny Vejlebo	13	11	11	8	9	Ret	13	8	15	11	12	8										56
14	(Norway) Kristian Sætheren	10	8	8	10	4	Ret	DSQ	12	14	Ret	Ret	Ret							14	15	Ret	53
15	(Denmark) Steffen Larsen	18	15	15	9	2	7	DSQ	Ret	11				DSQ	Ret	Ret				15	13	13	52
16	(Denmark) Carsten Lorenzen	17	Ret	18	13	DSQ	12	15	16	16	13	11	13	11	13	15	12	11	13				40
17	(Sweden) Kevin Engman																			9	4	DSQ	23
18	(Denmark) Kim Lund Johansen	14	14	13				9	Ret	Ret				Ret	12	10							23
19	(Denmark) Kim König	15	13	14	16	15	13	16	Ret	18				14	15	14				13	16	14	20
20	(Denmark) Hans Hartmann	19	DNS	16	15	13	14	17	15	17				12	14	13				DSQ	17	15	17
21	(Germany) Michelle Halder																			17	11	Ret	5
22	(Sweden) Christian Skaar																			18	Ret	DNS	0
23	(Denmark) Michael Carlsen													Ret	DNS	DNS							0
Pos.	Driver	PDB1			DJU			JYL1			COP			JYL2			PDB2			JYL3			Pts.

Colour	Result
Gold	Winner
Silver	Second place
Bronze	Third place
Green	Points classification
Blue	Non-points classification
Blue	Non-classified finish (NC)
Purple	Retired, not classified (Ret)
Red	Did not qualify (DNQ)
Red	Did not pre-qualify (DNPQ)
Black	Disqualified (DSQ)
White	Did not start (DNS)
White	Withdrew (WD)
White	Race cancelled (C)
Blank	Did not practice (DNP)
Blank	Did not arrive (DNA)
Blank	Excluded (EX)

**Bold** – Pole
Italics – Fastest Lap
