= Kasper H. Jensen =

Danish racing driver (born 1991)

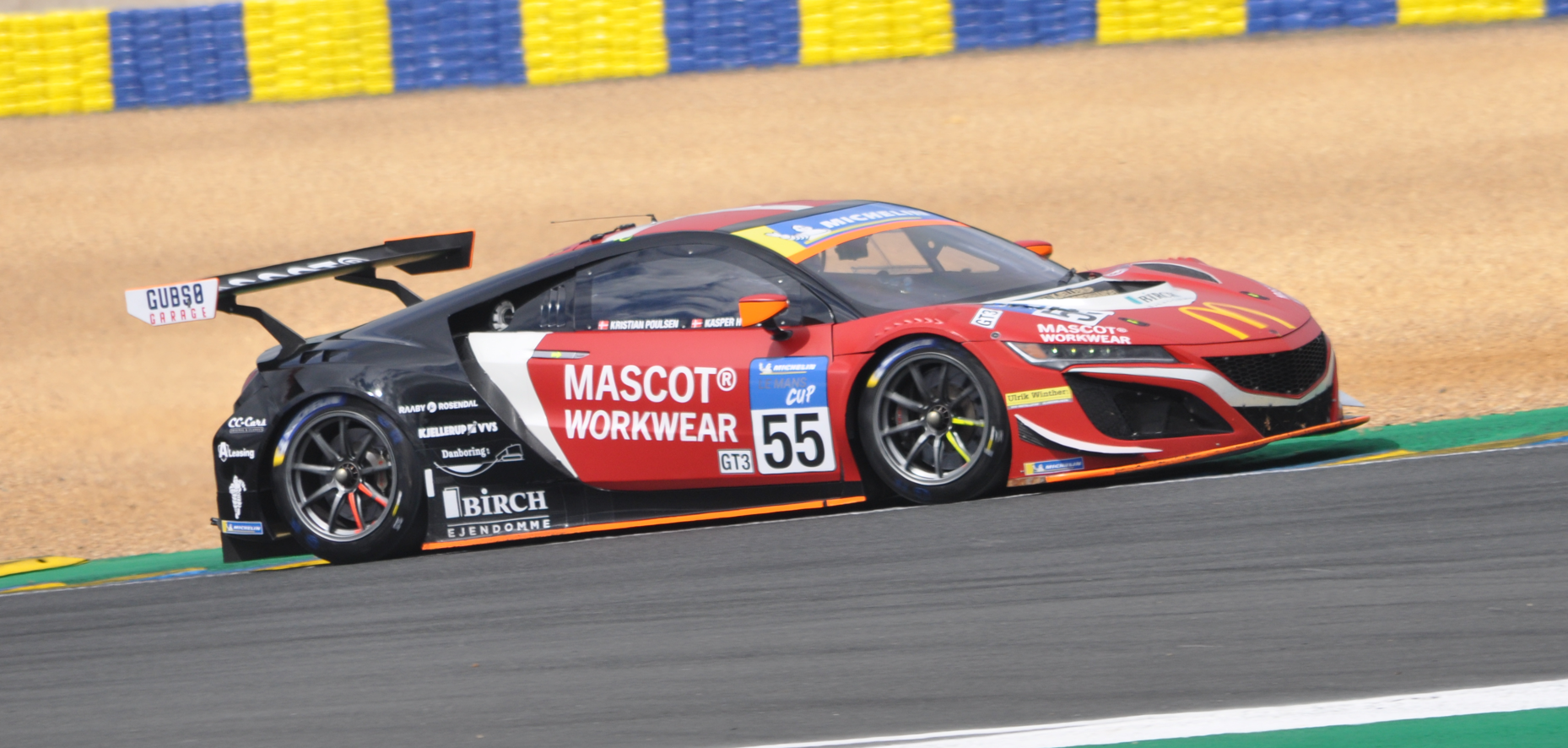
- Jensen in 2022
- Nationality: (Denmark) Danish
- Born: 10 July 1991 (age 35) Åbyhøj, Denmark
- Categorisation: FIA Silver

Previous series
- 2012–2013 2013–2014 2014–2019 2017 2020–2025 2022: Volkswagen Scirocco R-Cup; Legends Car Cup; Danish Thundersport Championship; VLN Series; TCR Denmark Touring Car Series; Le Mans Cup

Championship titles
- 2020–2024 2022 2016, 2018–2019: TCR Denmark Touring Car Series; Le Mans Cup – GT3; Danish Thundersport Championship

Kasper Herold Jensen (born 10 July 1991) is a Danish racing driver who currently competes in the Super GT Danmark for Mascot Motorsport Powered By Hegelund Motorsport.

Jensen is a five-time consecutive champion of the TCR Denmark Touring Car Series, winning every title from 2020 to 2024 and becoming the first TCR driver to accomplish this feat.

== Racing record ==
=== Racing career summary ===
Season	Series	Team	Races	Wins	Poles	F/Laps	Podiums	Points	Position
2012	Volkswagen Scirocco R-Cup		10	0	0	0	3	298	**3rd**
2013	Volkswagen Scirocco R-Cup		9	1	1	0	7	295	**2nd**
2013	Legends Car Cup	Nymark Racing	?	?	?	?	?	?	?
2014	Dubai 24 Hour – Sp3	Perfection Racing Europe	1	0	0	0	1	N/A	**2nd**
2014	Danish Thundersport Championship		3	0	0	0	0	20	22nd
2014	Legends Car Cup	KHJ Racing	?	?	?	?	?	?	**1st**
2015	Dubai 24 Hour – 997	HRT Performance 2	1	0	0	0	0	N/A	14th
2015	Danish Thundersport Championship	AD-Racing	23	0	0	0	6	280	4th
2016	Danish Thundersport Championship	AD-Racing	20	7	2	9	14	353	**1st**
2017	VLN Series – Cup 5	Walkenhorst Motorsport	2	0	0	0	0	12	28th
2017	24 Hours of Nürburgring – Cup 5	Walkenhorst Motorsport	1	0	0	0	0	N/A	4th
2017	Danish Thundersport Championship	STARK Racing 1	20	3	5	7	10	291	**3rd**
2018	Danish Thundersport Championship	STARK Racing	21	7	4	5	16	364	**1st**
2019	Danish Thundersport Championship	STARK Racing	8	4	5	3	6	892	**1st**
2020	TCR Denmark Touring Car Series	Massive Motorsport	15	4	3	3	13	290	**1st**
2021	TCR Denmark Touring Car Series	Massive Motorsport	21	4	2	2	17	371	**1st**
2022	TCR Denmark Touring Car Series	GMB Motorsport	21	7	3	8	16	428	**1st**
2022	Le Mans Cup – GT3	GMB Motorsport	7	2	0	0	6	109	**1st**
2023	Dubai 24 Hour – GT3	Poulsen Motorsport	1	0	0	0	0	N/A	27th
2023	TCR Denmark Touring Car Series	GMB Motorsport	21	8	6	8	12	362	**1st**
2024	TCR Denmark Touring Car Series	Mascot Motorsport	18	9	4	8	16	492	**1st**
2025	TCR Denmark Touring Car Series	Mascot Motorsport	18	6	3	9	16	469	**2nd**
2026	Super GT Danmark	Mascot Motorsport Powered By Hegelund Motorsport							
2026	GT World Challenge Europe Endurance Cup	Steller Motorsport	1	0	0	0	0	0	NC
2026	GT World Challenge Europe Endurance Cup – Gold	Steller Motorsport	1	0	0	0	0	0	NC†

=== Complete 24 Hours of Nürburgring results ===
Year	Team	Co-Drivers	Car	Class	Laps	Pos.	Class Pos.
2017	(Germany) Walkenhorst Motorsport	(Germany) Stefan Kruse (New Zealand) Guy Stewart (Germany) Florian Weber	BMW M235i Racing	Cup 5	129	63rd	4th

=== Complete TCR Denmark Touring Car Series results ===
(key) (Races in bold indicate pole position) (Races in italics indicate fastest lap)

Year	Team	Car	1	2	3	4	5	6	7	8	9	10	11	12	13	14	15	16	17	18	19	20	21	DC	Points
2020	Massive Motorsport	Honda Civic Type R TCR (FK7)	**JYL1**; **1**; 1	JYL1; 2; 3	JYL1; 3; 1	JYL2; 1; 2	JYL2; 2; 2	JYL2; 3; 4	JYL2; 4; 3	JYL2; 5; 3	JYL2; 6; 2	DJU; 1; 6	DJU; 2; 3	DJU; 3; 2	PDB; 1 C	PDB; 2 C	PDB; 3 C	**JYL3**; **1**; 1	JYL3; 2; 4	**JYL3**; **3**; 1				1st	290
2021	Massive Motorsport	Honda Civic Type R TCR (FK7)	DJU; 1; 4	DJU; 2; 2	DJU; 3; 2	JYL1; 1; 2	JYL1; 2; 5	JYL1; 3; 15	COP; 1; 1	COP; 2; 3	COP; 3; 1	JYL2; 1; 2	JYL2; 2; 3	JYL2; 3; 3	ARH; 1; 2	ARH; 2; 3	**ARH**; **3**; 1	JYL3; 1; 3	JYL3; 2; 3	JYL3; 3; 3	PDB; 1; 2	PDB; 2; 6	**PDB**; **3**; 1	1st	371
2022	GMB Motorsport	Honda Civic Type R TCR (FK7)	**PDB1**; **1**; 1	PDB1; 2; 6	PDB1; 3; 1	DJU; 1; 5	DJU; 2; 1	DJU; 3; 1	JYL1; 1; 2	JYL1; 2; 3	JYL1; 3; 1	COP; 1; 2	COP; 2; 2	COP; 3; 2	**JYL2**; **1** DSQ	JYL2; 2; 4	JYL2; 3; 2	**PDB2**; **1**; 1	PDB2; 2; 5	PDB2; 3; 1	JYL3; 1; 2	JYL3; 2; 3	JYL3; 3; 2	1st	428
2023	GMB Motorsport	Honda Civic Type R TCR (FK7)	**JYL1**; **1**; 1	JYL1; 2 Ret	JYL1; 3; 7	DJU; 1; 2	DJU; 2; 6	DJU; 3; 2	**FAL**; **1**; 1	FAL; 2; 8	FAL; 3; 16	**COP**; **1**; 1	COP; 2 Ret	COP; 3; 3	**JYL2**; **1**; 1	JYL2; 2; 4	JYL2; 3; 1	**PDB**; **1**; 1	PDB; 2; 6	PDB; 3; 1	**JYL3**; **1**; 1	JYL3; 2; 9	JYL3; 3; 2	1st	362
2024	Mascot Motorsport	Honda Civic Type R TCR (FL5)	**PDB1**; **1**; 2	PDB1; 2; 1	PDB1; 3; 2	**JYL1**; **1**; 1	JYL1; 2; 2	JYL1; 3; 3	**RUD**; **1**; 1	RUD; 2; 1	RUD; 3; 1	JYL2; 1; 2	JYL2; 2; 4	JYL2; 3; 3	DJU; 1 C	DJU; 2 C	DJU; 3 C	PDB2; 1; 1	PDB2; 2; 1	PDB2; 3; 10	**JYL3**; **1**; 1	JYL3; 2; 2	JYL3; 3; 1	1st	492
2025	Mascot Motorsport	Honda Civic Type R TCR (FL5)	PDB1; 1; 2	PDB1; 2; 1	**PDB1**; **3**; 1	JYL1; 1; 4	JYL1; 2; 3	JYL1; 3; 3	DJU; 1; 3	DJU; 2; 2	DJU; 3; 3	COP; 1; 2	COP; 2; 3	COP; 3; 2	JYL2; 1; 1	JYL2; 2; 1	**JYL2**; **3**; 1	**PDB2**; **1**; 2	PDB2; 2 Ret	PDB2; 3; 1				2nd	469

^{†} Driver did not finish, but was classified as he completed over 75% of the race distance.

=== Complete Le Mans Cup results ===
(key) (Races in bold indicate pole position; results in italics indicate fastest lap)

Year	Entrant	Class	Chassis	Engine	1	2	3	4	5	6	7	Rank	Points
2022	GMB Motorsport	GT3	Honda NSX GT3 Evo22	Honda JNC1 3.5 L Turbo V6	LEC; 1	IMO; 5	LMS; 1; 3	LMS; 2; 1	MNZ; 2	SPA; 3	**ALG**; 3	1st	109
