= DTCC =

DTCC is a four-letter initialism for:

- Depository Trust & Clearing Corporation
- Delaware Technical Community College
- Danish Touringcar Championship
