= Michael Carlsen =

Danish racing driver

Michael Carlsen (born 8 November 1963) is a Danish auto racing driver. Since its inaugural season in 1999 he has competed in the Danish Touring Car Championship. He is twice champion of the DTC in both 2000 and 2001 for his own Team Carlsen BP in a Peugeot 306. In his last full season in the DTC in 2008, he raced in a Peugeot 407.

== Career results ==
=== Complete TCR Denmark Touring Car Series results ===
(key) (Races in bold indicate pole position) (Races in italics indicate fastest lap)

Year	Team	Car	1	2	3	4	5	6	7	8	9	10	11	12	13	14	15	16	17	18	DC	Points
2020	Carlsen Motorsport	Peugeot 308 TCR	JYL1; 1; 13	JYL1; 2; 9	JYL1; 3; 8	JYL2; 1; 6	JYL2; 2 DSQ	JYL2; 3; 12	JYL2; 4; 11	JYL2; 5; 10	JYL2; 6; 11	DJU; 1	DJU; 2	DJU; 3	PAD; 1	PAD; 2	PAD; 3	JYL3; 1	JYL3; 2	JYL3; 3	11th*	64*

^{*} Season still in progress.

Sporting positions
Preceded by Jesper Sylvest	Danish Touring Car Champion; 2000 - 2001	Succeeded by Jason Watt
