= 2019 ADAC GT Masters =

Motorsport season

The 2019 ADAC GT Masters was the thirteenth season of the ADAC GT Masters, the grand tourer-style sports car racing founded by the German automobile club ADAC. The season began on 27 April at Oschersleben and ended on 29 September at the Sachsenring after seven double-header meetings.

== Entry list ==
Team	Car	No.	Driver	Status	Rounds
(Germany) Precote Herberth Motorsport	Porsche 911 GT3 R	1	(Austria) Thomas Preining		All
(Germany) Precote Herberth Motorsport	Porsche 911 GT3 R	1	(Germany) Robert Renauer		All
(Germany) Toksport WRT	Mercedes-AMG GT3	2	(Germany) Maro Engel		4–5
(Germany) Toksport WRT	Mercedes-AMG GT3	2	(Germany) Luca Stolz		4–5
(Germany) Aust Motorsport	Audi R8 LMS Evo	3	(Germany) Maximilian Hackländer		All
(Germany) Aust Motorsport	Audi R8 LMS Evo	3	(Switzerland) Remo Lips	T	1–5
(Germany) Aust Motorsport	Audi R8 LMS Evo	3	(Germany) Christopher Dreyspring	J	6–7
(Germany) Aust Motorsport	Audi R8 LMS Evo	4	(Germany) Arlind Hoti	J	All
(Germany) Aust Motorsport	Audi R8 LMS Evo	4	(Germany) Wolfgang Triller	T	1
(Germany) Aust Motorsport	Audi R8 LMS Evo	4	(Germany) Christopher Dreyspring	J	2
(Germany) Aust Motorsport	Audi R8 LMS Evo	4	(France) Stéphane Tribaudini	T	3–5, 7
(Germany) Aust Motorsport	Audi R8 LMS Evo	4	(Poland) Gosia Rdest		6
(Austria) HB Racing	Ferrari 488 GT3	7	(Germany) Sebastian Asch		All
(Austria) HB Racing	Ferrari 488 GT3	7	(Germany) Luca Ludwig		All
(Germany) HCB-Rutronik Racing	Audi R8 LMS Evo	8	(Germany) Dennis Marschall	J	All
(Germany) HCB-Rutronik Racing	Audi R8 LMS Evo	8	(Germany) Carrie Schreiner	J	All
(Germany) HCB-Rutronik Racing	Audi R8 LMS Evo	31	(South Africa) Kelvin van der Linde		All
(Germany) HCB-Rutronik Racing	Audi R8 LMS Evo	31	(Switzerland) Patric Niederhauser		All
(Germany) EFP Car Collection by TECE	Audi R8 LMS Evo	11	(Germany) Elia Erhart		All
(Germany) EFP Car Collection by TECE	Audi R8 LMS Evo	11	(Germany) Pierre Kaffer		All
(Germany) EFP Car Collection by TECE	Audi R8 LMS Evo	12	(Germany) Florian Spengler		All
(Germany) EFP Car Collection by TECE	Audi R8 LMS Evo	12	(Italy) Mattia Drudi	J	1–6
(Germany) EFP Car Collection by TECE	Audi R8 LMS Evo	12	(Germany) Christer Jöns		7
(Austria) RWT Racing	Corvette C7 GT3-R	13	(Germany) Sven Barth	T	All
(Austria) RWT Racing	Corvette C7 GT3-R	13	(Germany) David Jahn		All
(Germany) MRS GT-Racing	BMW M6 GT3	14	(Germany) Jens Klingmann		All
(Germany) MRS GT-Racing	BMW M6 GT3	14	(Denmark) Nicolai Sylvest	J	All
(Germany) KÜS Team75 Bernhard	Porsche 911 GT3 R	17	(Austria) Klaus Bachler		All
(Germany) KÜS Team75 Bernhard	Porsche 911 GT3 R	17	(Germany) Timo Bernhard		All
(Germany) KÜS Team75 Bernhard	Porsche 911 GT3 R	18	(Italy) Matteo Cairoli		All
(Germany) KÜS Team75 Bernhard	Porsche 911 GT3 R	18	(Belgium) Adrien De Leener		All
(Austria) Orange1 by GRT Grasser	Lamborghini Huracán GT3 Evo	19	(Italy) Michele Beretta	J	1–6
(Austria) Orange1 by GRT Grasser	Lamborghini Huracán GT3 Evo	19	(Italy) Marco Mapelli		1–6
(Austria) Orange1 by GRT Grasser	Lamborghini Huracán GT3 Evo	63	(Italy) Mirko Bortolotti		All
(Austria) Orange1 by GRT Grasser	Lamborghini Huracán GT3 Evo	63	(Germany) Christian Engelhart		All
(Austria) Orange1 by GRT Grasser	Lamborghini Huracán GT3 Evo	82	(Switzerland) Rolf Ineichen	T	All
(Austria) Orange1 by GRT Grasser	Lamborghini Huracán GT3 Evo	82	(France) Franck Perera		All
(Germany) Team Zakspeed BKK Mobil Oil Racing	Mercedes-AMG GT3	20	(Netherlands) Kelvin Snoeks		All
(Germany) Team Zakspeed BKK Mobil Oil Racing	Mercedes-AMG GT3	20	(Austria) Mick Wishofer	J	All
(Germany) Team Zakspeed BKK Mobil Oil Racing	Mercedes-AMG GT3	21	(Sweden) Jimmy Eriksson		All
(Germany) Team Zakspeed BKK Mobil Oil Racing	Mercedes-AMG GT3	21	(Netherlands) Jeroen Bleekemolen		1–2, 4–5
(Germany) Team Zakspeed BKK Mobil Oil Racing	Mercedes-AMG GT3	21	(Austria) Lucas Auer		3
(Germany) Team Zakspeed BKK Mobil Oil Racing	Mercedes-AMG GT3	21	(Germany) Daniel Keilwitz		6–7
(Germany) BWT Mücke Motorsport	Audi R8 LMS Evo	24	(Germany) Mike David Ortmann	J	All
(Germany) BWT Mücke Motorsport	Audi R8 LMS Evo	24	(Germany) Markus Winkelhock		All
(Germany) BWT Mücke Motorsport	Audi R8 LMS Evo	25	(Germany) Christopher Haase		All
(Germany) BWT Mücke Motorsport	Audi R8 LMS Evo	25	(Switzerland) Jeffrey Schmidt	J	All
(Germany) BWT Mücke Motorsport	Audi R8 LMS Evo	26	(Switzerland) Nikolaj Rogivue	J	All
(Germany) BWT Mücke Motorsport	Audi R8 LMS Evo	26	(Germany) Stefan Mücke		1–2, 5–7
(Germany) BWT Mücke Motorsport	Audi R8 LMS Evo	26	(Belgium) Frédéric Vervisch		3–4
(Germany) Montaplast by Land-Motorsport	Audi R8 LMS Evo	28	(Switzerland) Ricardo Feller	J	All
(Germany) Montaplast by Land-Motorsport	Audi R8 LMS Evo	28	(Belgium) Dries Vanthoor		1–6
(Germany) Montaplast by Land-Motorsport	Audi R8 LMS Evo	28	(Belgium) Frédéric Vervisch		7
(Germany) Montaplast by Land-Motorsport	Audi R8 LMS Evo	29	(Austria) Max Hofer	J	All
(Germany) Montaplast by Land-Motorsport	Audi R8 LMS Evo	29	(Germany) Christopher Mies		All
(Germany) Frikadelli Racing Team	Porsche 911 GT3 R	30	(Germany) Klaus Abbelen		5
(Germany) Frikadelli Racing Team	Porsche 911 GT3 R	30	(Australia) Matt Campbell		5
(Czech Republic) Team ISR	Audi R8 LMS Evo	33	(Czech Republic) Filip Salaquarda		All
(Czech Republic) Team ISR	Audi R8 LMS Evo	33	(Germany) Frank Stippler		All
(Germany) Schütz Motorsport	Mercedes-AMG GT3	36	(Germany) Marvin Dienst	J	All
(Germany) Schütz Motorsport	Mercedes-AMG GT3	36	(Australia) Aidan Read	J	All
(Germany) Mann-Filter Team HTP	Mercedes-AMG GT3	47	(Netherlands) Indy Dontje		All
(Germany) Mann-Filter Team HTP	Mercedes-AMG GT3	47	(Germany) Maximilian Götz		All
(Germany) Mann-Filter Team HTP	Mercedes-AMG GT3	48	(United Kingdom) Philip Ellis		All
(Germany) Mann-Filter Team HTP	Mercedes-AMG GT3	48	(Germany) Fabian Vettel	J	All
(Germany) IronForce Racing	Porsche 911 GT3 R	69	(Germany) Lucas Luhr		All
(Germany) IronForce Racing	Porsche 911 GT3 R	69	(Germany) Jan-Erik Slooten	T	1–3
(Germany) IronForce Racing	Porsche 911 GT3 R	69	(Germany) Marco Holzer		4–7
(Germany) T3 Motorsport	Audi R8 LMS Evo	71	(Germany) Maximilian Paul	J	All
(Germany) T3 Motorsport	Audi R8 LMS Evo	71	(Austria) Simon Reicher	J	1–2
(Germany) T3 Motorsport	Audi R8 LMS Evo	71	(United Kingdom) Will Tregurtha	J	3–7
(Germany) Callaway Competition	Corvette C7 GT3-R	77	(Germany) Marvin Kirchhöfer		1–6
(Germany) Callaway Competition	Corvette C7 GT3-R	77	(Germany) Markus Pommer		1–6
(Germany) PROpeak Performance	Aston Martin Vantage AMR GT3	98	(France) Valentin Hasse-Clot	J	1–2
(Germany) PROpeak Performance	Aston Martin Vantage AMR GT3	98	(Switzerland) Hugo de Sadeleer	J	1–2
(Germany) PROpeak Performance	Aston Martin Vantage AMR GT3	99	(Germany) Daniel Keilwitz		1–4
(Germany) PROpeak Performance	Aston Martin Vantage AMR GT3	99	(Belgium) Maxime Martin		1–3
(Germany) PROpeak Performance	Aston Martin Vantage AMR GT3	99	(Argentina) Ezequiel Pérez Companc	J	4

Icon	Legend
J	Junior
T	Trophy

== Race calendar and results ==
On 23 September 2018, the ADAC announced the 2019 calendar.

Round		Circuit	Date	Pole position	Race winner
1	R1	(Germany) Motorsport Arena Oschersleben	27 April	(Germany) No. 36 Schütz Motorsport	(Germany) No. 77 Callaway Competition
1	R1	(Germany) Motorsport Arena Oschersleben	27 April	(Germany) Marvin Dienst (Australia) Aidan Read	(Germany) Marvin Kirchhöfer (Germany) Markus Pommer
1	R2	(Germany) Motorsport Arena Oschersleben	28 April	(Austria) No. 63 Orange1 by GRT Grasser	(Germany) No. 1 Precote Herberth Motorsport
1	R2	(Germany) Motorsport Arena Oschersleben	28 April	(Italy) Mirko Bortolotti (Germany) Christian Engelhart	(Austria) Thomas Preining (Germany) Robert Renauer
2	R1	(Czech Republic) Autodrom Most	18 May	(Germany) No. 31 HCB-Rutronik Racing	(Germany) No. 31 HCB-Rutronik Racing
2	R1	(Czech Republic) Autodrom Most	18 May	(South Africa) Kelvin van der Linde (Switzerland) Patric Niederhauser	(South Africa) Kelvin van der Linde (Switzerland) Patric Niederhauser
2	R2	(Czech Republic) Autodrom Most	19 May	(Austria) No. 82 Orange1 by GRT Grasser	(Germany) No. 77 Callaway Competition
2	R2	(Czech Republic) Autodrom Most	19 May	(Switzerland) Rolf Ineichen (France) Franck Perera	(Germany) Marvin Kirchhöfer (Germany) Markus Pommer
3	R1	(Austria) Red Bull Ring	8 June	(Germany) No. 14 MRS GT-Racing	(Germany) No. 14 MRS GT-Racing
3	R1	(Austria) Red Bull Ring	8 June	(Germany) Jens Klingmann (Denmark) Nicolai Sylvest	(Germany) Jens Klingmann (Denmark) Nicolai Sylvest
3	R2	(Austria) Red Bull Ring	9 June	(Germany) No. 77 Callaway Competition	(Germany) No. 77 Callaway Competition
3	R2	(Austria) Red Bull Ring	9 June	(Germany) Marvin Kirchhöfer (Germany) Markus Pommer	(Germany) Marvin Kirchhöfer (Germany) Markus Pommer
4	R1	(Netherlands) Circuit Zandvoort	10 August	(Austria) No. 63 Orange1 by GRT Grasser	(Austria) No. 63 Orange1 by GRT Grasser
4	R1	(Netherlands) Circuit Zandvoort	10 August	(Italy) Mirko Bortolotti (Germany) Christian Engelhart	(Italy) Mirko Bortolotti (Germany) Christian Engelhart
4	R2	(Netherlands) Circuit Zandvoort	11 August	(Germany) No. 29 Montaplast by Land-Motorsport	(Germany) No. 28 Montaplast by Land-Motorsport
4	R2	(Netherlands) Circuit Zandvoort	11 August	(Austria) Max Hofer (Germany) Christopher Mies	(Switzerland) Ricardo Feller (Belgium) Dries Vanthoor
5	R1	(Germany) Nürburgring	17 August	(Austria) No. 63 Orange1 by GRT Grasser	(Austria) No. 63 Orange1 by GRT Grasser
5	R1	(Germany) Nürburgring	17 August	(Italy) Mirko Bortolotti (Germany) Christian Engelhart	(Italy) Mirko Bortolotti (Germany) Christian Engelhart
5	R2	(Germany) Nürburgring	18 August	(Austria) No. 82 Orange1 by GRT Grasser	(Germany) No. 17 KÜS Team75 Bernhard
5	R2	(Germany) Nürburgring	18 August	(Switzerland) Rolf Ineichen (France) Franck Perera	(Austria) Klaus Bachler (Germany) Timo Bernhard
6	R1	(Germany) Hockenheimring	14 September	(Germany) No. 8 HCB-Rutronik Racing	(Austria) No. 63 Orange1 by GRT Grasser
6	R1	(Germany) Hockenheimring	14 September	(Germany) Dennis Marschall (Germany) Carrie Schreiner	(Italy) Mirko Bortolotti (Germany) Christian Engelhart
6	R2	(Germany) Hockenheimring	15 September	(Germany) No. 31 HCB-Rutronik Racing	(Germany) No. 31 HCB-Rutronik Racing
6	R2	(Germany) Hockenheimring	15 September	(South Africa) Kelvin van der Linde (Switzerland) Patric Niederhauser	(South Africa) Kelvin van der Linde (Switzerland) Patric Niederhauser
7	R1	(Germany) Sachsenring	28 September	(Germany) No. 47 Mann-Filter Team HTP	(Germany) No. 47 Mann-Filter Team HTP
7	R1	(Germany) Sachsenring	28 September	(Netherlands) Indy Dontje (Germany) Maximilian Götz	(Netherlands) Indy Dontje (Germany) Maximilian Götz
7	R2	(Germany) Sachsenring	29 September	(Germany) No. 31 HCB-Rutronik Racing	(Germany) No. 31 HCB-Rutronik Racing
7	R2	(Germany) Sachsenring	29 September	(South Africa) Kelvin van der Linde (Switzerland) Patric Niederhauser	(South Africa) Kelvin van der Linde (Switzerland) Patric Niederhauser

== Championship standings ==
Scoring system

Championship points are awarded for the first fifteen positions in each race. Entries are required to complete 75% of the winning car's race distance in order to be classified and earn points. Individual drivers are required to participate for a minimum of 25 minutes in order to earn championship points in any race.

Position	**1st**	**2nd**	**3rd**	**4th**	**5th**	**6th**	**7th**	**8th**	**9th**	**10th**	**11th**	**12th**	**13th**	**14th**	**15th**
Points	25	20	16	13	11	10	9	8	7	6	5	4	3	2	1

=== Drivers' championships ===
==== Overall ====
Pos.	Driver	Team	OSC (Germany)		MST (Czech Republic)		RBR (Austria)		ZAN (Netherlands)		NÜR (Germany)		HOC (Germany)		SAC (Germany)		Points
1	(South Africa) Kelvin van der Linde (Switzerland) Patric Niederhauser	(Germany) HCB-Rutronik Racing	2	4	**1**	4	4	3	17	9	3	2	9	**1**	19	**1**	205
2	(Italy) Mirko Bortolotti (Germany) Christian Engelhart	(Austria) Orange1 by GRT Grasser	Ret	**21**	2	23	25	5	**1**	6	**1**	Ret	1	8	5	6	146
3	(Netherlands) Indy Dontje (Germany) Maximilian Götz	(Germany) Mann-Filter Team HTP	9	8	5	6	Ret	2	Ret	21	6	5	2	7	**1**	5	145
4	(Austria) Max Hofer (Germany) Christopher Mies	(Germany) Montaplast by Land-Motorsport	7	20	3	25	6	6	5	**2**	5	8	Ret	17	2	3	134
5	(Switzerland) Ricardo Feller	(Germany) Montaplast by Land-Motorsport	4	2	15	10	12	23	11	1	8	18	6	2	12	24	117
6	(Belgium) Dries Vanthoor	(Germany) Montaplast by Land-Motorsport	4	2	15	10	12	23	11	1	8	18	6	2			113
7	(Germany) Sven Barth (Germany) David Jahn	(Austria) RWT Racing	8	13	4	3	2	8	12	Ret	4	22	11	15	7	10	110
8	(Germany) Markus Pommer	(Germany) Callaway Competition	1	12	19	1	5	**1**	24	20	12	7	Ret	Ret	23	19	105
8	(Germany) Marvin Kirchhöfer	(Germany) Callaway Competition	1	12	19	1	5	**1**	24	20	12	7	Ret	Ret			105
9	(Austria) Klaus Bachler (Germany) Timo Bernhard	(Germany) KÜS Team75 Bernhard	14	Ret	Ret	21	3	22	2	10	13	1	5	4	16	11	103
10	(Switzerland) Rolf Ineichen (France) Franck Perera	(Austria) Orange1 by GRT Grasser	20	3	22	**2**	Ret	7	10	4	17	**DSQ**	12	3	11	22	89
11	(Sweden) Jimmy Eriksson	(Germany) Team Zakspeed BKK Mobil Oil Racing	18	18	9	12	8	11	13	16	16	12	4	9	4	2	87
12	(Germany) Mike David Ortmann (Germany) Markus Winkelhock	(Germany) BWT Mücke Motorsport	12	10	8	5	22	15	4	8	19	10	13	16	6	9	80
13	(Austria) Thomas Preining (Germany) Robert Renauer	(Germany) Precote Herberth Motorsport	6	1	21	Ret	7	Ret	Ret	17	9	11	24	6	13	8	79
14	(Germany) Jens Klingmann (Denmark) Nicolai Sylvest	(Germany) MRS GT-Racing	16	6	Ret	22	**1**	4	6	Ret	10	Ret	18	26	14	12	71
15	(Germany) Sebastian Asch (Germany) Luca Ludwig	(Austria) HB Racing	10	15	11	8	10	Ret	16	12	7	4	21	18	15	7	67
16	(Czech Republic) Filip Salaquarda (Germany) Frank Stippler	(Czech Republic) Team ISR	22	16	20	Ret	11	13	9	11	11	21	7	5	9	4	67
17	(Germany) Daniel Keilwitz	(Germany) PROpeak Performance	DSQ	DSQ	10	19	23	9	21	29							66
17	(Germany) Daniel Keilwitz	(Germany) Team Zakspeed BKK Mobil Oil Racing											4	9	4	2	66
18	(Italy) Michele Beretta (Italy) Marco Mapelli	(Austria) Orange1 by GRT Grasser	15	5	18	11	21	12	3	7	22	6	14	22			60
19	(Switzerland) Jeffrey Schmidt	(Germany) BWT Mücke Motorsport	3	11	26	9	9	10	15	14	21	9	10	19	17	17	59
19	(Germany) Christopher Haase	(Germany) BWT Mücke Motorsport	3	11	26	9	9	10	15	14	21	9	10	19			59
20	(Germany) Marvin Dienst (Australia) Aidan Read	(Germany) Schütz Motorsport	**5**	DSQ	6	13	18	14	Ret	24	15	14	23	11	8	14	46
21	(United Kingdom) Philip Ellis (Germany) Fabian Vettel	(Germany) Mann-Filter Team HTP	24	23	14	7	13	DSQ	7	3	29	16	Ret	DNS	22	16	40
22	(Switzerland) Nikolaj Rogivue	(Germany) BWT Mücke Motorsport	13	14	12	16	24	19	8	13	20	20	16	DSQ	10	23	33
23	(Netherlands) Kelvin Snoeks (Austria) Mick Wishofer	(Germany) Team Zakspeed BKK Mobil Oil Racing	Ret	DNS	28	DNS	14	18	Ret	23	30	25	Ret	13	3	27	22
24	(Germany) Dennis Marschall (Germany) Carrie Schreiner	(Germany) HCB-Rutronik Racing	25	22	Ret	15	Ret	Ret	14	19	14	17	**3**	Ret	DNS	25	22
25	(Netherlands) Jeroen Bleekemolen	(Germany) Team Zakspeed BKK Mobil Oil Racing	18	18	9	12			13	16	16	12					20
26	(Italy) Matteo Cairoli (Belgium) Adrien De Leener	(Germany) KÜS Team75 Bernhard	17	7	27	26	Ret	16	23	15	18	28	Ret	10	20	13	20
27	(Germany) Florian Spengler	(Germany) EFP Car Collection by TECE	11	19	7	14	15	Ret	Ret	18	28	15	Ret	20	21	20	19
27	(Italy) Mattia Drudi	(Germany) EFP Car Collection by TECE	11	19	7	14	15	Ret	Ret	18	28	15	Ret	20			19
28	(Belgium) Frédéric Vervisch	(Germany) BWT Mücke Motorsport					24	19	8	13					12	24	16
29	(Germany) Stefan Mücke	(Germany) BWT Mücke Motorsport	13	14	12	16					20	20	16	DSQ	10	23	15
30	(Austria) Lucas Auer	(Germany) Team Zakspeed BKK Mobil Oil Racing					8	11									13
31	(Belgium) Maxime Martin	(Germany) PROpeak Performance	DSQ	DSQ	10	19	23	9									13
32	(Germany) Elia Erhart (Germany) Pierre Kaffer	(Germany) EFP Car Collection by TECE	DSQ	9	13	Ret	16	Ret	18	22	27	19	17	21	24	26	10
33	(Germany) Lucas Luhr	(Germany) IronForce Racing	19	17	24	18	17	20	20	25	26	13	15	14	18	15	9
33	(Germany) Marco Holzer	(Germany) IronForce Racing							20	25	26	13	15	14	18	15	9
34	(Germany) Maximilian Paul	(Germany) T3 Motorsport	23	Ret	25	Ret	19	Ret	22	27	24	Ret	8	25	DNS	18	8
34	(United Kingdom) Will Tregurtha	(Germany) T3 Motorsport					19	Ret	22	27	24	Ret	8	25	DNS	18	8
	(Germany) Maximilian Hackländer	(Germany) Aust Motorsport	21	Ret	16	24	Ret	17	19	26	25	24	Ret	DNS	23	19	0
	(Switzerland) Remo Lips	(Germany) Aust Motorsport	21	Ret	16	24	Ret	17	19	26	25	24			DNS	21	0
	(Germany) Jan-Erik Slooten	(Germany) IronForce Racing	19	17	24	18	17	20									0
	(Germany) Arlind Hoti	(Germany) Aust Motorsport	27	24	17	17	20	21	Ret	28	31	26	19	24			0
	(Germany) Christopher Dreyspring	(Germany) Aust Motorsport			17	17							Ret	DNS			0
	(Poland) Gosia Rdest	(Germany) Aust Motorsport											19	24			0
	(France) Stéphane Tribaudini	(Germany) Aust Motorsport					20	21	Ret	28	31	26			DNS	21	0
	(France) Valentin Hasse-Clot (Switzerland) Hugo de Sadeleer	(Germany) PROpeak Performance	26	DSQ	23	20											0
	(Argentina) Ezequiel Pérez Companc	(Germany) PROpeak Performance							21	29							0
	(United Kingdom) Matthew George (Germany) David Griessner	(Germany) PROpeak Performance											22	23			0
	(Austria) Simon Reicher	(Germany) T3 Motorsport	23	Ret	25	Ret											0
	(Germany) Wolfgang Triller	(Germany) Aust Motorsport	27	24													0
Entries ineligible to score points
	(Germany) Maro Engel (Germany) Luca Stolz	(Germany) Toksport WRT							Ret	5	2	3					
	(Australia) Matt Campbell (Germany) Marco Seefried	(Germany) SSR Performance											20	12			
	(Germany) Klaus Abbelen (Australia) Matt Campbell	(Germany) Frikadelli Racing Team									23	23					
Pos.	Driver	Team	OSC (Germany)		MST (Czech Republic)		RBR (Austria)		ZAN (Netherlands)		NÜR (Germany)		HOC (Germany)		SAC (Germany)		Points

Key
Colour	Result
Gold	Race winner
Silver	2nd place
Bronze	3rd place
Green	Points finish
Blue	Non-points finish
Blue	Non-classified finish (NC)
Purple	Did not finish (Ret)
Black	Disqualified (DSQ)
Black	Excluded (EX)
White	Did not start (DNS)
White	Race cancelled (C)
White	Withdrew (WD)
Blank	Did not participate

**Bold** – Pole
Italics – Fastest Lap

==== Junior Cup ====
Pos.	Driver	Team	OSC (Germany)		MST (Czech Republic)		RBR (Austria)		ZAN (Netherlands)		NÜR (Germany)		HOC (Germany)	SAC (Germany)	Points
1	(Austria) Max Hofer	(Germany) Montaplast by Land-Motorsport	7	20	**3**	25	6	6	5	2	5	9			170
2	(Switzerland) Ricardo Feller	(Germany) Montaplast by Land-Motorsport	4	**2**	15	**10**	12	23	11	1	8	19			147
3	(Germany) Marvin Dienst (Australia) Aidan Read	(Germany) Schütz Motorsport	**5**	DSQ	6	13	18	14	Ret	24	15	15			138
4	(Germany) Fabian Vettel	(Germany) Mann-Filter Team HTP	24	23	14	7	13	DSQ	7	3	29	17			138
5	(Italy) Michele Beretta	(Austria) Orange1 by GRT Grasser	15	5	18	11	21	12	3	7	22	7			134
6	(Germany) Mike David Ortmann	(Germany) BWT Mücke Motorsport	12	10	8	5	22	15	4	8	19	11			129
7	(Switzerland) Jeffrey Schmidt	(Germany) BWT Mücke Motorsport	3	11	26	9	9	10	15	14	21	10			128
8	(Italy) Mattia Drudi	(Germany) EFP Car Collection by TECE	11	19	7	14	15	Ret	Ret	18	28	16			115.5
9	(Denmark) Nicolai Sylvest	(Germany) MRS GT-Racing	16	6	Ret	22	**1**	**4**	6	Ret	10	Ret			106
10	(Switzerland) Nikolaj Rogivue	(Germany) BWT Mücke Motorsport	13	14	12	16	24	19	8	13	20	21			83
11	(Germany) Dennis Marschall (Germany) Carrie Schreiner	(Germany) HCB-Rutronik Racing	25	22	Ret	15	Ret	Ret	14	19	14	18			82.5
12	(Germany) Arlind Hoti	(Germany) Aust Motorsport	27	24	17	17	20	21	Ret	28	31	27			66.75
13	(Austria) Mick Wishofer	(Germany) Team Zakspeed BKK Mobil Oil Racing	Ret	DNS	28	DNS	14	18	Ret	23	30	26			54
14	(Germany) Maximilian Paul	(Germany) T3 Motorsport	23	Ret	25	Ret	19	Ret	22	27	24	Ret			49.5
15	(United Kingdom) Will Tregurtha	(Germany) T3 Motorsport					19	Ret	22	27	24	Ret			33
16	(Germany) Christopher Dreyspring	(Germany) Aust Motorsport			17	17									21
17	(France) Valentin Hasse-Clot (Switzerland) Hugo de Sadeleer	(Germany) PROpeak Performance	26	DSQ	23	20									21
18	(Austria) Simon Reicher	(Germany) T3 Motorsport	23	Ret	25	Ret									16.5
19	(Argentina) Ezequiel Pérez Companc	(Germany) PROpeak Performance							21	29					8
Pos.	Driver	Team	OSC (Germany)		MST (Czech Republic)		RBR (Austria)		ZAN (Netherlands)		NÜR (Germany)		HOC (Germany)	SAC (Germany)	Points

==== Trophy Cup ====
Pos.	Driver	Team	Points
1	(Germany) Sven Barth	(Austria) RWT Racing	300
2	(Switzerland) Remo Lips	(Germany) Aust Motorsport	227.5
3	(Switzerland) Rolf Ineichen	(Austria) Orange1 by GRT Grasser	202
4	(Germany) Jan-Erik Slooten	(Germany) IronForce Racing	147
5	(France) Stéphane Tribaudini	(Germany) Aust Motorsport	103.5
6	(Germany) Wolfgang Triller	(Germany) Aust Motorsport	42

=== Teams' championship ===
Pos.	Team	Manufacturer	OSC (Germany)		MST (Czech Republic)		RBR (Austria)		ZAN (Netherlands)		NÜR (Germany)		HOC (Germany)	SAC (Germany)	Points
1	(Austria) Orange1 by GRT Grasser	Lamborghini	15	**3**	2	**2**	21	5	**1**	4	**1**	**1**			162
2	(Germany) HCB-Rutronik Racing	Audi	2	4	**1**	4	4	3	14	9	3	3			153
3	(Germany) Montaplast by Land-Motorsport	Audi	4	2	3	10	6	6	5	**1**	5	9			137
4	(Germany) Callaway Competition	Chevrolet	1	12	19	1	5	**1**	24	20	12	8			115
5	(Germany) Mann-Filter Team HTP	Mercedes-AMG	9	8	5	6	13	2	7	3	6	6			114
6	(Austria) RWT Racing	Chevrolet	8	13	4	3	2	8	12	Ret	4	23			97
7	(Germany) BWT Mücke Motorsport	Audi	3	10	8	5	9	10	4	8	19	10			95
8	(Germany) KÜS Team75 Bernhard	Porsche	14	7	27	21	3	16	2	10	13	2			90
9	(Germany) MRS GT-Racing	BMW	16	6	Ret	22	**1**	4	6	Ret	10	Ret			71
10	(Germany) Precote Herberth Motorsport	Porsche	6	1	21	Ret	7	Ret	Ret	17	9	12			67
11	(Austria) HB Racing	Ferrari	10	15	11	8	10	Ret	16	12	7	5			67
12	(Germany) Team Zakspeed BKK Mobil Oil Racing	Mercedes-AMG	18	18	9	12	8	11	13	16	16	13			54
13	(Germany) Schütz Motorsport	Mercedes-AMG	**5**	DSQ	6	13	18	14	Ret	24	15	15			43
14	(Germany) EFP Car Collection by TECE	Audi	11	9	7	14	15	Ret	18	18	27	16			43
15	(Czech Republic) Team ISR	Audi	22	16	20	Ret	11	13	9	11	11	22			43
16	(Germany) IronForce Racing	Porsche	19	17	24	18	17	20	20	25	26	14			18
17	(Germany) PROpeak Performance	Aston Martin	26	DSQ	10	19	23	9	21	29					17
18	(Germany) Aust Motorsport	Audi	21	24	16	17	20	17	19	26	25	25			14
19	(Germany) T3 Motorsport	Audi	23	Ret	25	Ret	19	Ret	22	27	24	Ret			1
Entries ineligible to score points
	(Germany) Toksport WRT	Mercedes-AMG							Ret	5	2	4			
	(Germany) Frikadelli Racing Team	Porsche									23	24			
Pos.	Team	Manufacturer	OSC (Germany)		MST (Czech Republic)		RBR (Austria)		ZAN (Netherlands)		NÜR (Germany)		HOC (Germany)	SAC (Germany)	Points

== Bibliography ==
- Tim Upietz; Oliver Runschke (2019). ADAC GT Masters Jahrbuch 2019 (in German). Duisburg: Gruppe C Motorsport Verlag. p. 224. ISBN 978-3-948501-01-3.
