= Danish Thundersport Championship =

- Country: Denmark
- Inaugural season: 2012
- Folded: 2019

The Danish Thundersport Championship (DTC) was a Danish stock car racing series held from 2012 to 2019. It was administered by DTC Motorsport A / S (DTC A / S), and ran according to DASU regulations. The series featured American muscle by Campbell Camaro Racing (CCR). DTC took over the abbreviation from the Danish Touringcar Championship.

== Champions ==
Year	Driver
2012	Jan Magnussen
2013	Dennis Lind
2014	Casper Elgaard
2015	Casper Elgaard
2016	Kasper H. Jensen
2017	Lasse Sørensen
2018	Kasper H. Jensen
2019	Kasper H. Jensen

== Weblinks ==
- https://raceresult.dk/
- https://web.archive.org/web/20191213000334/http://www.dtc-motorsport.dk/ (DTC Official Website 2019 archive)
