= Casper Elgaard =

Danish auto racing driver (born 1978)

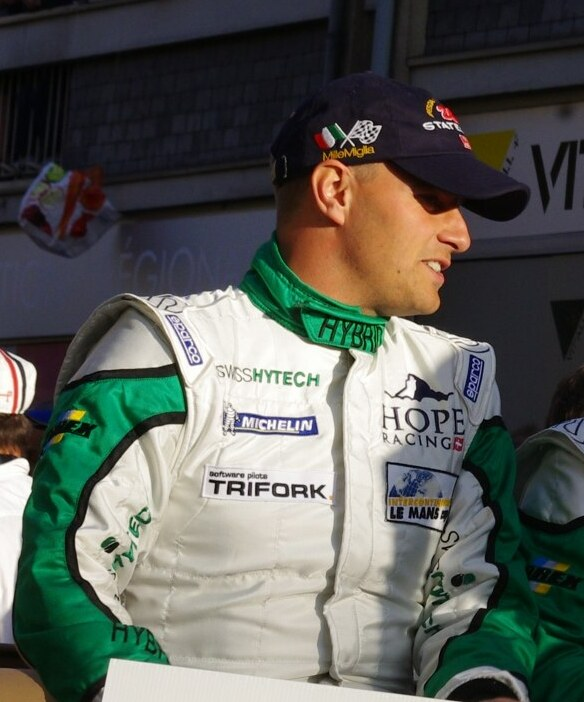
- Elgaard in 2011
- Nationality: (Denmark) Danish
- Born: Casper Gunvad Elgaard; 5 April 1978 (age 48) Aarhus, Denmark
- Categorisation: FIA Gold (until 2014); FIA Silver (2015–2023); FIA Bronze (2024–)

24 Hours of Le Mans career
- Years: 2001, 2003–2004, 2006 – 2009, 2011
- Teams: Massive Motorsport, Elgaard Motorsport, Team Den Blå Avis, RN Motorsport Ltd., Lister Racing, Zytek Engineering, Aston Martin Racing Larbre, Team Essex
- Best finish: 7th (2007)
- Class wins: 1 (2009)

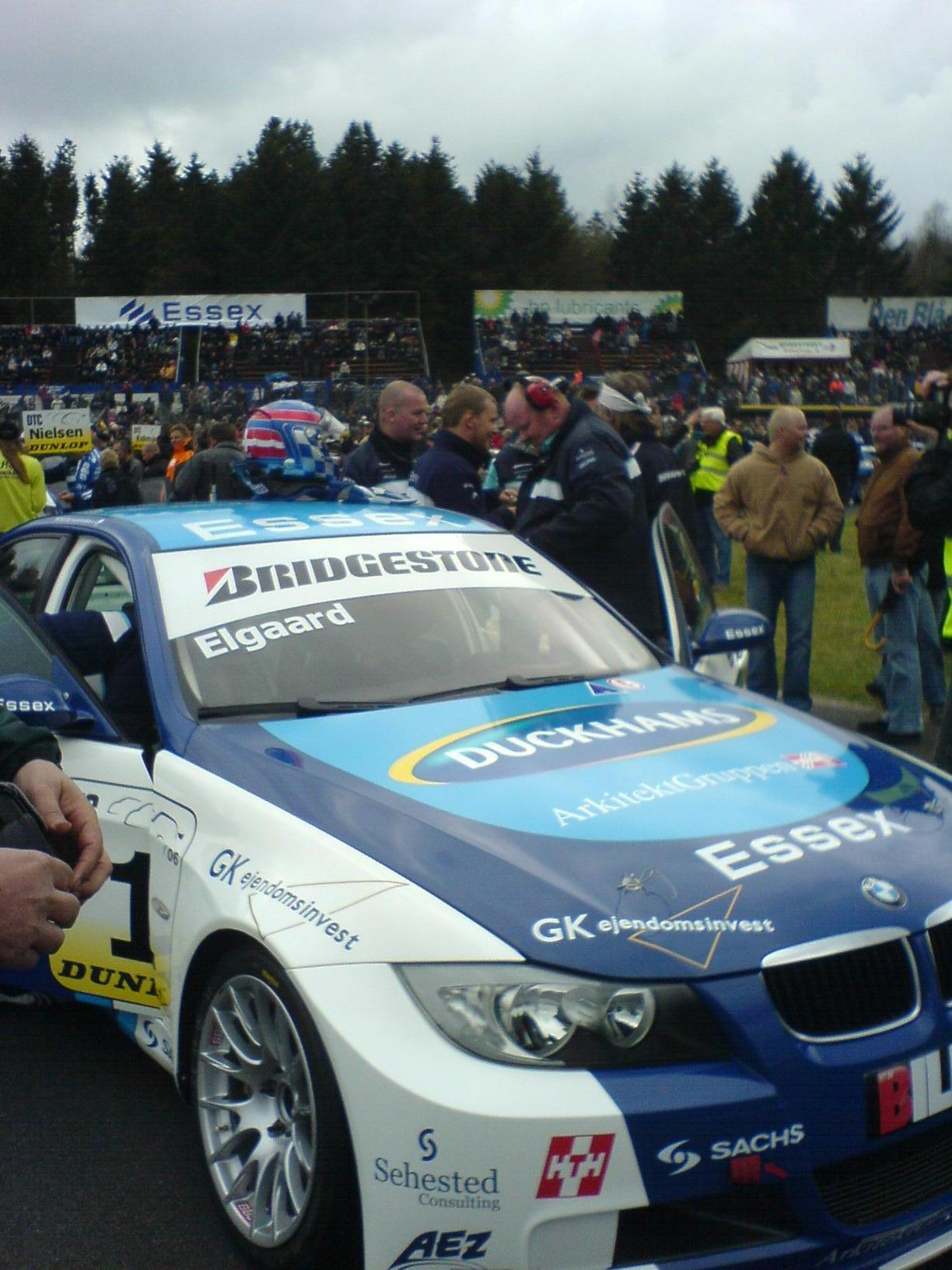
Elgaard in a BMW 320si waiting to start in the Danish Touring Car Championship.

Casper Gunvad Elgaard (born 5 April 1978) is a Danish auto racing driver. He has competed several times in the 24 Hours of Le Mans since 2001, as well as regular drives in the Le Mans Series. In 2008, he finished second in the LMP2 class of Le Mans for Team Essex in a Porsche RS Spyder. He also won his class at the 2008 1000 km of Monza. In 2009 24 Hours of Le Mans Elgaard won the LMP2 class in the Team Essex Porsche Spyder.

Elgaard won the Danish Touring Car Championship between 2004 and 2006, and again in the series final season in 2010. Later, he won the Danish Thundersport Championship in 2014 and 2015. Early racing includes finishing as runner-up in the 1998 Danish Formula Ford series, as well as a drive in German Formula Ford. In 1999 he raced in the Formula Renault Euro Cup.

After competing in the TCR Scandinavia Touring Car Championship in 2019, Elgaard would drive for his team, Massive Motorsport, which was the first team to enter, in the inaugural TCR Denmark Touring Car Series in 2020.

== 24 Hours of Le Mans results ==
Year	Team	Co-Drivers	Car	Class	Laps	Pos.	Class Pos.
2001	(Denmark) Team Den Blå Avis (Japan) Team Goh	(Denmark) John Nielsen (Japan) Hiroki Katoh	Dome S101-Judd	LMP900	66	DNF	DNF
2003	(United Kingdom) RN Motorsport	(Denmark) John Nielsen (Japan) Hayanari Shimoda	DBA4 03S-Zytek	LMP675	288	22nd	**2nd**
2004	(United Kingdom) Lister Racing	(Denmark) John Nielsen (Denmark) Jens Reno Møller	Lister Storm LMP-Chevrolet	LMP1	279	24th	9th
2006	(United Kingdom) Zytek Engineering (Denmark) Team Essex Invest	(Denmark) John Nielsen (Denmark) Philip Andersen	Zytek 06S	LMP1	269	NC	NC
2007	(France) Aston Martin Racing Larbre	(France) Christophe Bouchut (Italy) Fabrizio Gollin	Aston Martin DBR9	GT1	341	7th	**3rd**
2008	(Denmark) Team Essex	(Denmark) John Nielsen (Germany) Sascha Maassen	Porsche RS Spyder Evo	LMP2	347	12th	**2nd**
2009	(Denmark) Team Essex	(Denmark) Kristian Poulsen (France) Emmanuel Collard	Porsche RS Spyder Evo	LMP2	357	10th	**1st**
2011	(Switzerland) Hope Racing	(Switzerland) Steve Zacchia (Netherlands) Jan Lammers	Oreca 01-Swiss HyTech	LMP1	115	DNF	DNF

=== Complete TCR Denmark Touring Car Series results ===
(key) (Races in bold indicate pole position) (Races in italics indicate fastest lap)

Year	Team	Car	1	2	3	4	5	6	7	8	9	10	11	12	13	14	15	16	17	18	DC	Points
2020	TPR Motorsport	Honda Civic Type R TCR (FK8)	JYL1; 1	JYL1; 2	JYL1; 3	JYL2; 1; 1	**JYL2**; **2**; 1	JYL2; 3; 8	JYL2; 4; 1	JYL2; 5; 5	JYL2; 6; 1	DJU; 1 Ret	DJU; 1 Ret	DJU; 3	PAD; 1	PAD; 2	PAD; 3	JYL3; 1; 15	JYL3; 2; 6	JYL3; 3; 3	7th	167

^{*} Season still in progress.

Sporting positions
Preceded by Jan Magnussen	Danish Touring Car Champion; 2004 – 2006	Succeeded by Michel Nykjaer
Preceded by Michel Nykjaer	Danish Touring Car Champion; 2010	Succeeded by series became STCC
