= Jyllands-Ringen =

Racing circuit in Resenbro, Denmark

- Full Circuit (2003–present)
- Location: Silkeborg (Resenbro), Denmark
- Coordinates: 56°10′32″N 9°39′39″E
- FIA Grade: 4
- Broke ground: 1965
- Opened: 15 May 1966; 60 years ago
- Major events: Current: PCC Scandinavia (2004–2005, 2010–2011, 2024–present); Nordic 4 (2017–present); Former: TCR Denmark (2020–2025); STCC (2001, 2010–2012, 2019); F5000 (1973); Danish Grand Prix (1974–1977, 1995)
- Website: http://www.jyllands-ringen.dk/

Full Circuit (2003–present)
- Length: 2.300 km (1.429 mi)
- Turns: 16
- Race lap record: 1:04.349 ( (Denmark) Casper Pilgaard, Mygale M14-F4, 2018, F4)

Short Circuit (1967–present)
- Length: 1.475 km (0.917 mi)
- Turns: 9
- Race lap record: 0:42.410 ( (Finland) Jonas Salmimäki, Reynard 913, 1995, F3)

Original Circuit (1966–1975)
- Length: 1.699 km (1.056 mi)
- Turns: 12
- Race lap record: 0:45.500 ( (Belgium) Teddy Pilette, Chevron B24, 1973, F5000)

FDM Jyllands-Ringen is a motor racing circuit in Resenbro, near Silkeborg in Denmark. The circuit was extended from 1.475 km (0.917 mi) to 2.300 km (1.429 mi) in 2003, by linking the track to an adjacent oval circuit.

Jyllands-Ringen hosted regular rounds of the Danish Touringcar Championship. From 2014 to 2019, it hosted multiple annual rounds of the Danish Thundersport Championship. Since 2020, it has hosted multiple annual rounds of the TCR Denmark Touring Car Series.

This was the home of the Danish Grand Prix in 1968, 1969 and 1970 the races were for Sports Prototypes and Sports GT cars. The 1968 and 1969 Danish Grand Prix were both won by Barrie Smith in a Chevron B8 Ford. A Ford twin cam engine car in 1968 and a Cosworth FVA engine car in 1969.

== Lap records ==
As of June 2026, the fastest official race lap records at the Jyllands-Ringen are listed as:

Category	Time	Driver	Vehicle	Event
Full Circuit (2003–present): 2.300 km (1.429 mi)
Formula 4	1:04.349	Casper Pilgaard	Mygale M14-F4	2018 2nd Jyllands-Ringen Danish F4 round
Lamborghini Super Trofeo	1:04.629	Frederik Schandorff	Lamborghini Huracán Super Trofeo Evo2	2023 1st Jyllands-Ringen Special Saloon Car Denmark round
GT3	1:04.862	Walther Trabjerg	Porsche 911 (991 II) GT3 R	2023 1st Jyllands-Ringen Danish Endurance Championship round
Formula Renault 2.0	1:06.103	Steffen Møller	Tatuus FR2000	2006 2nd Jyllands-Ringen Formula Renault 2.0 Nordic Series round
Formula Ford	1:06.486	Aske Nygaard Bramming	Mygale SJ08	2017 3rd Jyllands-Ringen Danish F4 round
Porsche Carrera Cup	1:06.714	William Siverholm	Porsche 911 (992 II) Cup	2026 Jyllands-Ringen Porsche Carrera Cup Scandinavia round
Formula Nova	1:07.609	Richard Olson	Aquila Formula Nova	2026 1st Jyllands-Ringen Nordic 4 round
TCR Touring Car	1:09.900	Kasper Jensen	Honda Civic Type R TCR (FL5)	2025 2nd Jyllands-Ringen TCR Denmark round
Super 2000	1:10.742	Jan Magnussen	BMW 320si	2008 1st Jyllands-Ringen DTC round
Short Circuit (1967–present): 1.475 km (0.917 mi)
Formula Three	0:42.410	Jonas Salmimäki	Reynard 913	1995 Danish Grand Prix
Formula Renault 2.0	0:43.636	Jacob Ludvigsen	Tatuus FR2000	2002 3rd Jyllands-Ringen Formula Renault 2000 Scandinavia round
Formula Ford	0:45.061	Mikkel C. Johansen	Van Diemen DP08	2010 3rd Jyllands-Ringen Danish Formula Ford round
Super Touring	0:45.372	Jan Lindblom	Volvo S40	2001 Jyllands-Ringen STCC round
GT1	0:45.598	Henrik Vestergaard	Chevrolet Corvette C5-R	2001 Jyllands-Ringen Swedish GTR round
Super 2000	0:46.309	Casper Elgaard	BMW 320si	2010 4th Jyllands-Ringen DTC round
Original Circuit (1966–1975): 1.699 km (1.056 mi)
Formula 5000	0:45.500	Teddy Pilette	Chevron B24	1973 Jyllands-Ringen F5000 round
Group 6	0:47.700	Jo Bonnier	Lola T210	1970 Jyllands-Ringen Danish Grand Prix
Formula Three	0:50.800	Reine Wisell	Brabham BT18	1967 Esso Jyllands Grand National
