= Copenhagen Historic Grand Prix =

Racetrack in Denmark

Bellahøj Park
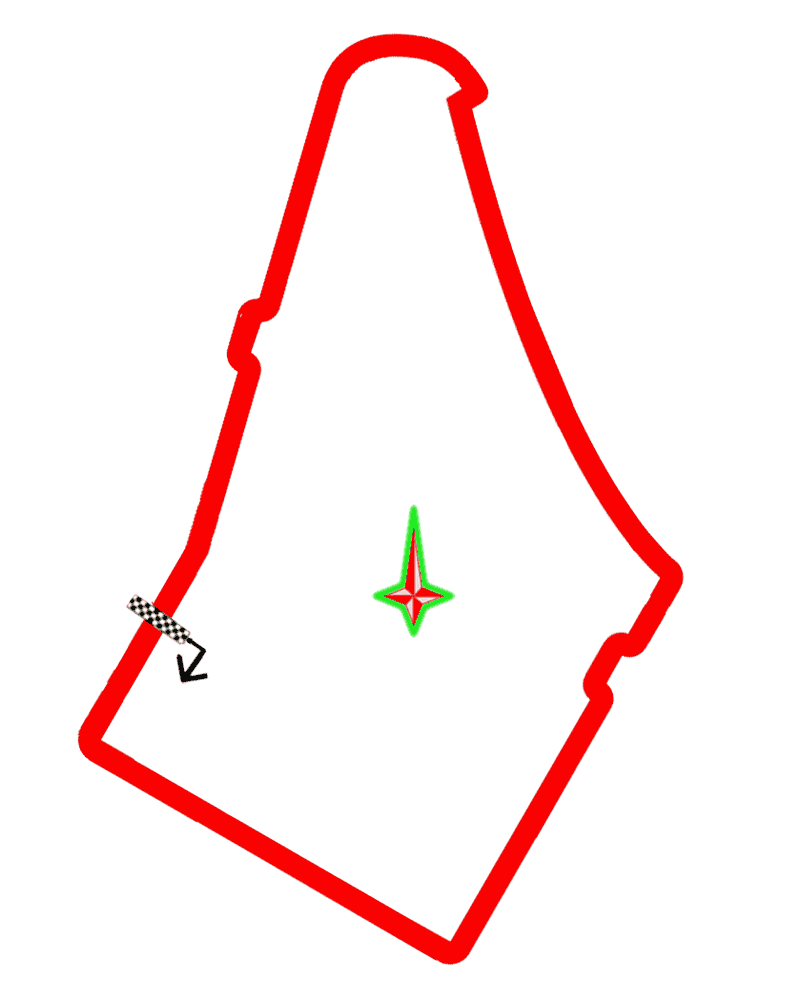
- Grand Prix Circuit (2013–present)
- Location: Bellahøj, Copenhagen, Denmark
- Coordinates: 55°42′05″N 12°30′35″E
- Opened: 2013
- Major events: Former: Copenhagen Historic Grand Prix (2013–2019, 2021–2025); TCR Denmark (2021–2023, 2025); Pure ETCR (2021)

Grand Prix Circuit (2013–present)
- Length: 2.274 km (1.413 mi)
- Turns: 15
- Race lap record: 1:04.312 ( (Germany) Mike Halder, Honda Civic Type R TCR (FK8), 2022, TCR)

Copenhagen Historic Grand Prix is a vintage motor sports car race held annually on the grounds of Bellahøj in Copenhagen, Denmark. It has been arranged since 2001 (at Fælledparken from 2001 to 2012) except 2020 and takes place in the first weekend of August. Prince Joachim of Denmark is a regular participator along with numerous Danish and International professional racing drivers.

Cars compete separately in various classes, including a large number of vehicles in the pre-World War II class. Around 200 vintage cars participate, such as Bentley's from the 1920s, Bugatti's from the 1930s, Jaguar's and Porsche's from the 1950s and Lotus Cortina's, Alfa Romeo's and Jaguar E's from the 1960s. The only non-historic car to participate in the event was the Zenvo ST1.

The Royal Pro-Am Class is the class where Prince Joachim and other amateurs share their cars with professional drivers. In 2008, 25 Le Mans drivers attended the race, including the eight time Le Mans winner Tom Kristensen.

The event also features other races, such as the Danish Thundersport Championship, Super GT Danmark, TCR Denmark, Pure ETCR, and Legends Cars.

In addition, various other demonstrations, presentations and car shows take place as well as the marking of historic car models.

== Lap records ==
As of August 2022, the fastest official race lap records at the Bellahøj Park Copenhagen Historic Grand Prix Circuit are listed as:

Category	Time	Driver	Vehicle	Event
Grand Prix Circuit (2013–present): 2.274 km (1.413 mi)
TCR Touring Car	1:04.312	Mike Halder	Honda Civic Type R TCR (FK8)	2022 Copenhagen TCR Denmark round
ETCR	1:09.902	Philipp Eng	Alfa Romeo Giulia ETCR	2021 Copenhagen Pure ETCR round

== Environmental sustainability ==
They have set goals for 2022, 2023 and 2025 for environmental sustainability. In 2022, the Copenhagen Historic Grand Prix received an Environmental Accreditation Programme star from the FIA. To meet the requirements for the star, they implemented electric shuttles buses, bought offsets for their fuel, measured annual noise pollution, put deposit tokens on drinking glasses, and had their electricity supplied Ørsted , or an on site generator. In 2023, they reduced food waste, handled fossil fuel spills better, refined handling of car parts, produced merchandise sustainably, emphasized showcasing of Electric and Hybrid cars, expanded use of synthetic and CO_{2} compensated fuel, reported CO_{2} emissions, created space for bicycling, provided vegetarian food alternatives, among others. For these and other efforts, a second Environmental Accreditation Programme star was later rewarded to them in 2023. They have expressed the intent to achieve the final FIA Environmental Accreditation Programme star. The Copenhagen Historic Grand Prix states that they will decrease emissions and better handle waste to do this.

== Race for the kingdom fundraiser ==
Race for the kingdom is a charity event to aid children and young people in times of need. All proceeds go to the Children and Youth Program at Rigshospitalet. Those who choose to partake in it can watch the drivers of the cars while being beside them. It runs for one hour on both Saturday and Sunday, spectators and visitors to the Copenhagen Historic Grand Prix at Bellahøj Park. Prices differ depending on the car and the driver. The Ryttergården in front of Grøndal MultiCenter is where tickets are purchased. According to the website, 6,500,000 Danish krone has been raised since 2010. There are three different classes AM, RACE, and PRO, with PRO being the most expensive.
