= Ring Djursland =

Motor racing circuit in Pederstrup, Denmark

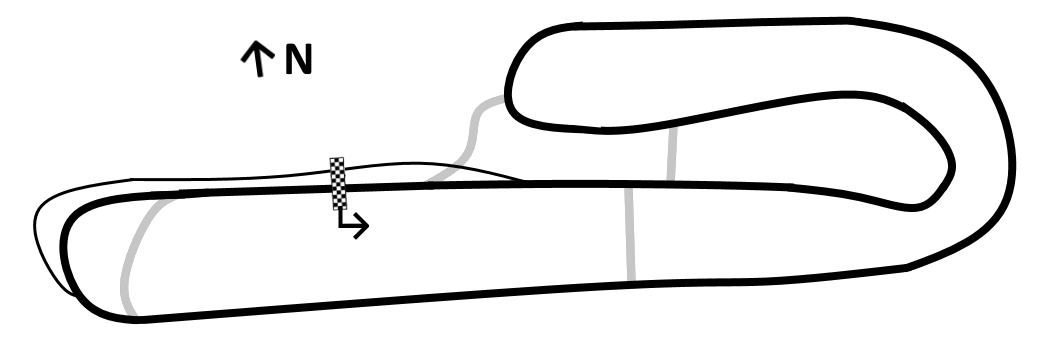
- Full Circuit (1965–present)
- Location: Pederstrup, Denmark
- Coordinates: 56°20′14″N 10°41′00″E
- Owner: Tradium Transport Uddannelsescenter Djursland
- Opened: 9 August 1965; 60 years ago
- Major events: Former: TCR Denmark (2020–2025); Nordic 4 (2017–2025); European F3 (1975); Danish Grand Prix (1973)

Full Circuit (1965–present)
- Length: 1.750 km (1.087 mi)
- Turns: 6
- Race lap record: 0:46.597 ( (Denmark) Henrik Lilja, PVP Superkart, 2012, Superkart)

Ring Djursland is a motor racing circuit in Pederstrup, Denmark. The circuit is owned by Tradium, who run daily driving courses there. It used to host rounds of the Danish Touringcar Championship and the Danish Thundersport Championship. it hosts the F4 Danish Championship since 2017, and TCR Denmark Touring Car Series since 2020.

Ring Djursland first opened in 1965, but was altered a year later to its current layout. In 1983 it was bought by the Danish state, who renovated the track to use it as an educational centre with advanced driving courses for lorry drivers. After losing its environmental permit in the late 1980s, it reopened for racing in 1994. A relatively short circuit at 1.750 km (1.087 mi), it is known for its tight and hilly circuit layout.

== Lap records ==
As of September 2020, the fastest official race lap records at the Ring Djursland are listed as:

| Category | Time | Driver | Vehicle | Event |
Full Circuit (1965–present): 1.750 km (1.087 mi)
| Superkart | 0:46.597 | Henrik Lilja | PVP Superkart | 2012 Djursland Danish Superkart round |
| Formula Renault 2.0 | 0:47.440 | Jesper Wulff Laursen | Tatuus FR2000 | 2005 Djursland Formula Renault Scandinavia round |
| Formula Ford | 0:48.797 | Aske Nygaard Bramming | Mygale SJ08 | 2017 2nd Djursland Danish F4 round |
| Formula 4 | 0:49.702 | Benjamin Bailly | Mygale M14-F4 | 2017 2nd Djursland Danish F4 round |
| TCR Touring Car | 0:50.625 | Martin Andersen | Hyundai i30 N TCR | 2020 Djursland TCR Denmark round |
| Group A | 0:55.532 | Michael Carlsen | Peugeot 306 GTI | 2001 Djursland DTC round |
