= Danish Touringcar Championship =

- Category: Touring cars
- Country: Denmark
- Inaugural season: 1999
- Folded: 2010
- Last Drivers' champion: (Denmark) Casper Elgaard
- Last Makes' champion: BMW
- Last Teams' champion: Team Telesikring
- Official website: dtc-net

The Danish Touringcar Championship (abbreviated as the DTC) was a touring car racing series in Denmark. The inaugural year for the DTC was 1999, after the huge success in Scandinavia of the British Touring Car Championship. For the first two years it was known as the Danish Touring Car Challenge. The final DTC season was in 2010, as the series merged with the Swedish Touring Car Championship to form the Scandinavian Touring Car Championship.

In 2012 the series was succeeded by the Danish Thundersport Championship to inherit the DTC abbreviation, using the Camaro Cup cars as a basis.

== Champions ==
Season	Driver	Team	Car
1999	(Denmark) Jesper Sylvest	Sylvest Motorsport	Peugeot 306 GTi
2000	(Denmark) Michael Carlsen	Team Carlsen BP	Peugeot 306 GTi
2001	(Denmark) Michael Carlsen	Team Carlsen BP	Peugeot 306 GTi
2002	(Denmark) Jason Watt	Peugeot Statoil Motorsport	Peugeot 307 XSi
2003	(Denmark) Jan Magnussen	Peugeot Statoil Motorsport	Peugeot 307 GTi
2004	(Denmark) Casper Elgaard	Team Essex Invest	BMW 320i
2005	(Denmark) Casper Elgaard	Team Essex Invest	BMW 320i
2006	(Denmark) Casper Elgaard	Team Essex Invest	BMW 320si
2007	(Denmark) Michel Nykjær	SEAT Racing Team	SEAT León
2008	(Denmark) Jan Magnussen	Den Blå Avis Fleggaard Racing	BMW 320si
2009	(Denmark) Michel Nykjær	Chevrolet Motorsport Danmark	Chevrolet Lacetti
2010	(Denmark) Casper Elgaard	Team Telesikring	BMW 320si

== Weblinks ==
- https://raceresult.dk/
- https://web.archive.org/web/20041210042410/http://www.dtc-net.dk/ (DTC Official Website 2004 archive)
- https://web.archive.org/web/20100728205044/http://www.dtc-net.dk/ (DTC Official Website 2010 archive)
