= 2024 Nürburgring Langstrecken-Serie drivers classification =

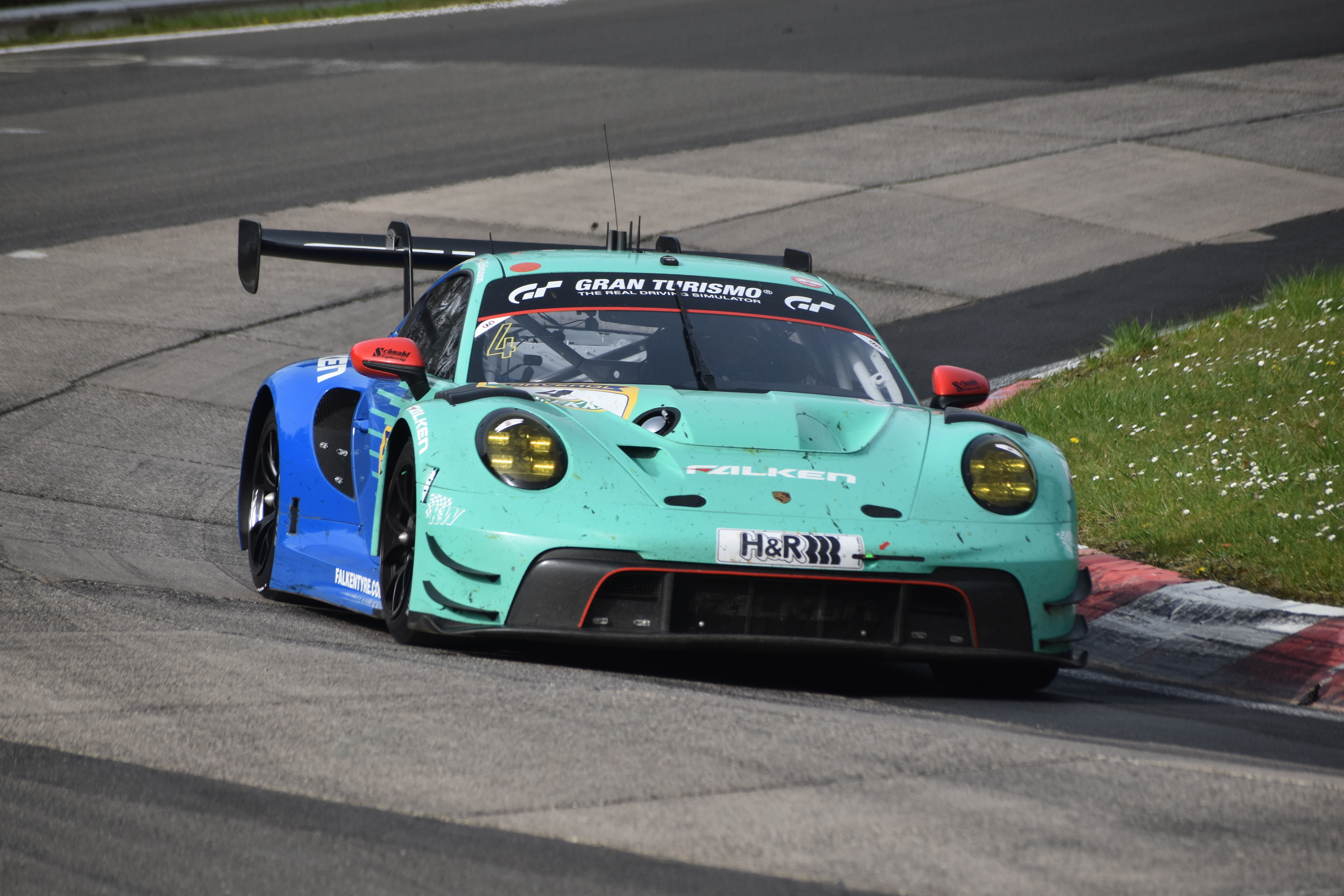
The overall teams' champions, #4 Falken Motorsports and their Porsche 911 GT3 R.

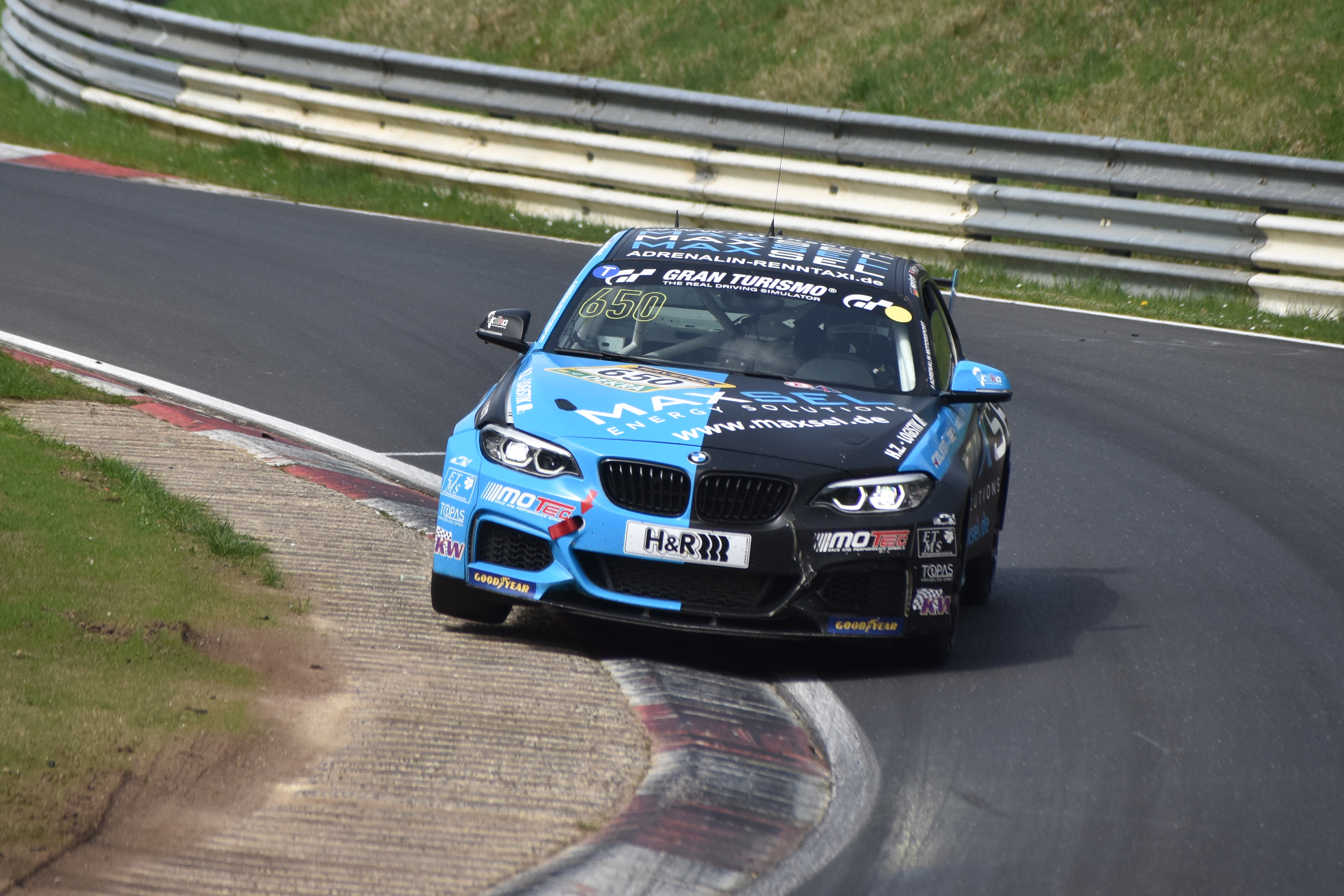
Toby Goodman, Sven Markert, and Ranko Mijatovic won the overall drivers' championship.

The 2024 Nürburgring Langstrecken-Serie is the 47th season of the German endurance series (formerly VLN) run at the Nürburgring Nordschleife, and fifth run as the Nürburgring Langstrecken Serie (NLS). The season will begin on 6 April and end on 16 November.

== Drivers classification ==
=== Overall ===
Pos.	Driver	Team	Class	NLS1	NLS2	24H-Q1	24H-Q2	NLS3	NLS4	NLS5	NLS6	Points
1	(United Kingdom) Toby Goodman	(Germany) #650 Adrenalin Motorsport Team Mainhatten Wheels	M240i	1^{15}	1^{15}	1^{15}	1^{15}	Ret		1^{15}	1^{15}	90
1	(United Kingdom) Toby Goodman	(Germany) #711 Adrenalin Motorsport Team Mainhatten Wheels	V4						Ret			90
1	(Germany) Sven Markert	(Germany) #650 Adrenalin Motorsport Team Mainhatten Wheels	M240i	1^{15}	1^{15}	1^{15}	1^{15}	Ret		1^{15}	1^{15}	90
1	(Germany) Sven Markert	(Germany) #711 Adrenalin Motorsport Team Mainhatten Wheels	V4						Ret			90
1	(Switzerland) Ranko Mijatovic	(Germany) #650 Adrenalin Motorsport Team Mainhatten Wheels	M240i	1^{15}	1^{15}	1^{15}	1^{15}	Ret		1^{15}	1^{15}	90 (95)
1	(Switzerland) Ranko Mijatovic	(Germany) #711 Adrenalin Motorsport Team Mainhatten Wheels	V4						Ret			90 (95)
1	(Switzerland) Ranko Mijatovic	(Germany) #930 Adrenalin Motorsport Team Mainhatten Wheels	CUP3						5^{(5)}	Ret		90 (95)
4	(Germany) Joshua Bednarski	(Germany) #962 AVIA W&S Motorsport	CUP3	2^{11}	1^{15}	1^{15}	1^{15}	1^{15}	1^{19}	WD	Ret	90
4	(Germany) Lucas Daugaard	(Germany) #962 AVIA W&S Motorsport	CUP3	2^{11}	1^{15}	1^{15}	1^{15}	1^{15}	1^{19}	WD	Ret	90
4	(Germany) Moritz Oberheim	(Germany) #962 AVIA W&S Motorsport	CUP3	2^{11}	1^{15}	1^{15}	1^{15}	1^{15}	1^{19}	WD	Ret	90
7	(United Kingdom) Joshua Hislop	(Germany) #491 Mertens Motorsport	VT2-FWD	1^{15}	1^{15}	1^{15}	NC	1^{15}	1^{14}	6^{3}	2^{11}	85 (88)
7	(Germany) Daniel Mertens	(Germany) #491 Mertens Motorsport	VT2-FWD	1^{15}	1^{15}	1^{15}	NC	1^{15}	1^{14}	6^{3}	2^{11}	85 (88)
7	(Germany) Daniel Mertens	(Germany) #496 Mertens Motorsport	VT2-FWD					5^{(4)}				85 (88)
9	(Germany) Tobias Müller	(Germany) #148 Black Falcon Team 48 LOSCH	CUP2	4^{6}	1^{15}	1^{15}	3^{8}	3^{8}	1^{19}	1^{15}		83 (97)
9	(Germany) Tobias Müller	(Germany) #103 Black Falcon	CUP2	12^{(1)}	5^{(4)}						2^{11}	83 (97)
10	(Germany) Tim Sandtler	(Germany) #170 Toyo Tires with Ring Racing	SP10	1^{15}	2^{11}	1^{15}	Ret	1^{15}	4^{8}	1^{15}		79 (85)
10	(Germany) Tim Sandtler	(Germany) #171 Toyo Tires with Ring Racing	SP10								2^{6}	79 (85)
10	(Germany) Tim Sandtler	(Germany) #347 Toyo Tires with Ring Racing	SP-Pro						1^{(3)}	DNS	1^{(2)}	79 (85)
11	(Germany) Andreas Gülden	(Germany) #170 Toyo Tires with Ring Racing	SP10	1^{15}	2^{11}	1^{15}	Ret	1^{15}	4^{8}	1^{15}	1^{2}	79 (81)
11	(Germany) Andreas Gülden	(Germany) #347 Toyo Tires with Ring Racing	SP-Pro						1^{(3)}	DNS		79 (81)
11	(Germany) Marc Hennerici	(Germany) #170 Toyo Tires with Ring Racing	SP10	1^{15}	2^{11}	1^{15}	Ret	1^{15}	4^{8}	1^{15}	1^{2}	79 (81)
11	(Germany) Marc Hennerici	(Germany) #347 Toyo Tires with Ring Racing	SP-Pro						1^{(3)}	DNS		79 (81)
13	(Israel) Moran Gott	(Germany) #1/500 Adrenalin Motorsport Team Mainhatten Wheels	VT2-R+4WD	1^{15}	7^{2}	1^{15}	1^{15}	Ret	Ret	1^{15}	1^{15}	77
13	(Germany) Philipp Leisen	(Germany) #1/500 Adrenalin Motorsport Team Mainhatten Wheels	VT2-R+4WD	1^{15}	7^{2}	1^{15}	1^{15}	Ret	Ret	1^{15}	1^{15}	77
13	(Germany) Daniel Zils	(Germany) #1/500 Adrenalin Motorsport Team Mainhatten Wheels	VT2-R+4WD	1^{15}	7^{2}	1^{15}	1^{15}	Ret	Ret	1^{15}	1^{15}	77 (85)
13	(Germany) Daniel Zils	(Germany) #396 Adrenalin Motorsport Team Mainhatten Wheels	V6	1^{(3)}	1^{(3)}	1^{(4)}	1^{(4)}	1^{(3)}	1^{(5)}	2^{(3)}	1^{(3)}	77 (85)
16	(Germany) Heiko Eichenberg	(Germany) #959 SRS Team Sorg Rennsport	CUP3	1^{15}	Ret	Ret	2^{11}	2^{11}	3^{10}	1^{15}	1^{15}	77
16	(Germany) Heiko Eichenberg	(Germany) #181 SRS Team Sorg Rennsport	SP10								4^{(3)}	77
16	(Germany) Fabio Grosse	(Germany) #959 SRS Team Sorg Rennsport	CUP3	1^{15}	Ret	Ret	2^{11}	2^{11}	3^{10}	1^{15}	1^{15}	77
16	(Germany) Patrik Grütter	(Germany) #959 SRS Team Sorg Rennsport	CUP3	1^{15}	Ret	Ret	2^{11}	2^{11}	3^{10}	1^{15}	1^{15}	77
19	(Germany) Daniel Blickle	(Germany) #120 AVIA W&S Motorsport	CUP2	1^{15}	Ret	2^{11}	4^{6}	2^{11}	2^{14}	2^{11}	1^{15}	77 (83)
19	(Germany) David Jahn	(Germany) #120 AVIA W&S Motorsport	CUP2	1^{15}	Ret	2^{11}	4^{6}	2^{11}	2^{14}	2^{11}	1^{15}	77 (83)
19	(Germany) Tim Scheerbarth	(Germany) #120 AVIA W&S Motorsport	CUP2	1^{15}	Ret	2^{11}	4^{6}	2^{11}	2^{14}	2^{11}	1^{15}	77 (83)
22	(Luxembourg) Steve Jans	(Germany) #148 Black Falcon Team 48 LOSCH	CUP2	4^{6}	1^{15}	1^{15}	3^{8}	3^{8}	1^{19}			76 (82)
22	(Luxembourg) Steve Jans	(Germany) #103 Black Falcon	CUP2								2^{11}	76 (82)
23	(Germany) Noah Nagelsdiek	(Germany) #148 Black Falcon Team 48 LOSCH	CUP2	4^{6}	1^{15}	1^{15}	3^{8}			1^{15}		70
23	(Germany) Noah Nagelsdiek	(Germany) #103 Black Falcon								2^{11}		70
24	(Norway) Oskar Sandberg	(Germany) #169 Dörr Motorsport	SP10	2^{11}	1^{15}			Ret	2^{14}	Ret	1^{8}	67
24	(Norway) Oskar Sandberg	(Germany) #169 Dörr Motorsport	SP8T			1^{11}	1^{8}					67
24	(Germany) Nick Wüstenhagen	(Germany) #169 Dörr Motorsport	SP10	2^{11}	1^{15}			Ret	2^{14}	Ret	1^{8}	67
24	(Germany) Nick Wüstenhagen	(Germany) #169 Dörr Motorsport	SP8T			1^{11}	1^{8}					67
26	(Netherlands) Piet-Jan Ooms	(Germany) #504 SRS Team Sorg Rennsport	VT2-R+4WD	3^{8}	2^{11}	2^{11}	3^{8}	3^{8}	1^{19}	4^{6}	3^{8}	65 (79)
27	(Germany) Yannik Himmels	(Germany) #651 Adrenalin Motorsport Team Mainhatten Wheels	M240i	2^{11}	2^{11}	Ret	2^{11}	1^{8}	1^{8}	2^{11}	Ret	60
27	(United States) Nico Silva	(Germany) #651 Adrenalin Motorsport Team Mainhatten Wheels	M240i	2^{11}	2^{11}	Ret	2^{11}	1^{8}	1^{8}	2^{11}	Ret	60
29	(India) Akshay Gupta	(Germany) #492 Mertens Motorsport	VT2-FWD	5^{4}	5^{4}	3^{8}	Ret	Ret	2^{10}	1^{15}	1^{15}	56
29	(Germany) Alex Georg Schneider	(Germany) #492 Mertens Motorsport	VT2-FWD	5^{4}	5^{4}	3^{8}	Ret	Ret	2^{10}	1^{15}	1^{15}	56
Pos.	Driver	Team	Class	NLS1	NLS2	24H-Q1	24H-Q2	NLS3	NLS4	NLS5	NLS6	Points

Pos.	Driver	Team	Class	NLS1	NLS2	24H-Q1	24H-Q2	NLS3	NLS4	NLS5	NLS6	Points
31	(Germany) Michael Eichhorn	(Germany) #469 Auto Thomas by Jung Motorsport	VT2-FWD	2^{11}	Ret							56
31	(Germany) Michael Eichhorn	(Germany) #470 Auto Thomas by Jung Motorsport	VT2-FWD					2^{11}		3^{8}	Ret	56
31	(Germany) Michael Eichhorn	(Germany) #495 Auto Thomas by Jung Motorsport	VT2-FWD			2^{11}	1^{15}					56
31	(Germany) Tobias Jung	(Germany) #469 Auto Thomas by Jung Motorsport	VT2-FWD	2^{11}	Ret			4^{6}				56
31	(Germany) Tobias Jung	(Germany) #470 Auto Thomas by Jung Motorsport	VT2-FWD	DNS				2^{11}		3^{8}	Ret	56
31	(Germany) Tobias Jung	(Germany) #495 Auto Thomas by Jung Motorsport	VT2-FWD			2^{11}	1^{15}					56
33	(Germany) Florian Kramer	(United States) #731 Plusline Racing Team	V4			2^{4}	1^{8}	3^{8}	1^{19}	1^{8}	2^{8}	55
33	(Germany) Romano Schultz	(United States) #731 Plusline Racing Team	V4			2^{4}	1^{8}	3^{8}	1^{19}	1^{8}	2^{8}	55
35	(Germany) Aaron Wenisch	(Germany) #169 Dörr Motorsport	SP10	2^{11}	1^{15}			Ret		Ret	1^{8}	53
35	(Germany) Aaron Wenisch	(Germany) #169 Dörr Motorsport	SP8T			1^{11}	1^{8}					53
36	(Germany) Horst Baumann	(Germany) #950 Schmickler Performance powered by Ravenol	CUP3	3^{8}	2^{11}	4^{6}	3^{8}	7^{2}		2^{11}	3^{8}	52 (54)
37	(Germany) Ben Bünnagel	(Belgium) #122 Mühlner Motorsport	CUP2	2^{11}	3^{8}	4^{6}	2^{11}	4^{6}	4^{8}	Ret	3^{8}	52 (58)
38	(Denmark) Mads Gravsen	(Germany) #949 SRS Team Sorg Rennsport	CUP3	Ret	4^{6}	2^{11}	5^{4}	3^{8}	2^{14}	9^{1}	4^{6}	49 (50)
38	(United Kingdom) Harley Haughton	(Germany) #949 SRS Team Sorg Rennsport	CUP3	Ret	4^{6}	2^{11}	5^{4}	3^{8}	2^{14}	9^{1}	4^{6}	49 (50)
40	(Germany) Desiree Müller	(Germany) #701/711 EiFelkind Racing Team	V4	2^{6}	2^{6}	DNS	4^{3}	1^{15}	2^{14}	3^{4}	DSQ	45 (48)
40	(Germany) Tim Lukas Müller	(Germany) #701/711 EiFelkind Racing Team	V4	2^{6}	2^{6}	DNS	4^{3}	1^{15}	2^{14}	3^{4}	DSQ	45 (48)
37	(Germany) Andreas Winterwerber	(Germany) #495 Auto Thomas by Jung Motorsport	VT2-FWD			2^{11}	1^{15}					45
37	(Germany) Andreas Winterwerber	(Germany) #470 Auto Thomas by Jung Motorsport	VT2-FWD					2^{11}		3^{8}	Ret	45
43	(Sweden) Dan Berghult	(Germany) #703/750 Keeevin Sports and Racing	V4	1^{8}	DNS	3^{3}	3^{4}	4^{6}	4^{8}	2^{6}	1^{11}	43 (46)
43	(Finland) Juha Miettinen	(Germany) #703/750 Keeevin Sports and Racing	V4	1^{8}	DNS	3^{3}	3^{4}	4^{6}	4^{8}	2^{6}	1^{11}	43 (46)
43	(Brazil) Flavia Pellegrino Fernandes	(Germany) #703/750 Keeevin Sports and Racing	V4	1^{8}	DNS	3^{3}	3^{4}	4^{6}	4^{8}	2^{6}	1^{11}	43 (46)
46	(Germany) Christopher Brück	(Germany) #121 KKrämer Racing	CUP2	3^{8}	NC	7^{2}	1^{15}	Ret	3^{10}	3^{8}	Ret	43
46	(Germany) Christopher Brück	(Germany) #112 KKrämer Racing	CUP2					Ret				43
46	(Germany) Michele Di Martino	(Germany) #121 KKrämer Racing	CUP2	3^{8}	NC	7^{2}	1^{15}	Ret	3^{10}	3^{8}	Ret	43
48	(Germany) Klaus Faßbender	(Germany) #652 Adrenalin Motorsport Team Mainhatten Wheels	M240i	3^{8}	Ret	2^{11}	3^{8}		2^{5}	3^{8}		40
49	(Germany) Peter Terting	(Belgium) #124 Mühlner Motorsport	CUP2	11^{1}	2^{11}	3^{8}	Ret	1^{15}	6^{4}			39
50	(Germany) Michael Tischner	(Germany) #171 Toyo Tires with Ring Racing	SP10	8^{1}	5^{4}	2^{11}	2^{11}	3^{8}	6^{4}			39
51	(Germany) "Sub7BTG"	(Germany) #501 Adrenalin Motorsport Team Mainhatten Wheels	VT2-R+4WD	4^{6}	5^{4}	4^{6}	2^{11}		4^{8}	8^{1}		36
52	(Switzerland) Ivan Jacoma	(Germany) #184/165 Schmickler Performance powered by Ravenol	SP10	3^{8}	3^{8}	3^{8}	Ret	2^{11}		Ret	Ret	35
52	(Germany) Claudius Karch	(Germany) #184/165 Schmickler Performance powered by Ravenol	SP10	3^{8}	3^{8}	3^{8}	Ret	2^{11}		Ret	Ret	35
52	(Germany) Kai Riemer	(Germany) #184/165 Schmickler Performance powered by Ravenol	SP10	3^{8}	3^{8}	3^{8}	Ret	2^{11}		Ret	Ret	35
55	(Germany) Marvin Marino	(Germany) #651 Adrenalin Motorsport Team Mainhatten Wheels	M240i	2^{11}	2^{11}	Ret	2^{11}					33
56	(Germany) Danny Brink	(Germany) #476 Sharky Racing	VT2-FWD	3^{8}	3^{8}	Ret	WD					32
56	(Germany) Danny Brink	(Germany) #650 Adrenalin Motorsport Team Mainhatten Wheels	M240i					Ret				32
56	(Germany) Danny Brink	(Germany) #652 Adrenalin Motorsport Team Mainhatten Wheels	M240i								3^{8}	32
56	(Germany) Danny Brink	(Germany) #711 Adrenalin Motorsport Team Mainhatten Wheels	V4						Ret			32
56	(Germany) Danny Brink	(Germany) #313 Sharky Racing	SP3T							1^{8}		32
57	(Germany) Moritz Kranz	(Belgium) #122 Mühlner Motorsport	CUP2	2^{(11)}	3^{(8)}	4^{6}	2^{(11)}	4^{6}	4^{8}	Ret		32 (55)
57	(Germany) Moritz Kranz	(Belgium) #124 Mühlner Motorsport	CUP2	11^{1}	2^{11}	3^{(8)}	Ret					32 (55)
58	(Germany) Oliver Frisse	(Germany) #700/702 IFB powered by QTQ Race Performance	V4	Ret	1^{8}	1^{6}	2^{6}	Ret	3^{10}			30
58	(Germany) Jürgen Huber	(Germany) #700/702 IFB powered by QTQ Race Performance	V4	Ret	1^{8}	1^{6}	2^{6}	Ret	3^{10}			30
58	(Germany) Simon Sagmeister	(Germany) #700/702 IFB powered by QTQ Race Performance	V4	Ret	1^{8}	1^{6}	2^{6}	Ret	3^{10}			30
61	(Austria) David Griessner	(Germany) #930 Adrenalin Motorsport Team Mainhatten Wheels	CUP3	4^{6}	3^{8}	3^{8}	9^{1}	Ret	5^{5}	Ret	11^{1}	29
61	(Germany) Stefan Kruse	(Germany) #930 Adrenalin Motorsport Team Mainhatten Wheels	CUP3	4^{6}	3^{8}	3^{8}	9^{1}	Ret	5^{5}	Ret	11^{1}	29
63	(Norway) Håkon Schjærin	(Norway) #801 Møller Bil Motorsport	TCR	1^{6}		2^{11}		1^{3}		1^{8}		28
64	(Ukraine) Oleksii Kikireshko	(Germany) #969 SRS Team Sorg Rennsport	CUP3	Ret	5^{4}	5^{4}	7^{2}	5^{4}	6^{4}	3^{8}	5^{4}	28 (30)
65	(Germany) Daniel Korn	(Germany) #444 Adrenalin Motorsport Team Mainhatten Wheels	V5	1^{4}	1^{4}	1^{6}	Ret	1^{4}	1^{5}	2^{4}	Ret	27
65	(Germany) Tobias Korn	(Germany) #444 Adrenalin Motorsport Team Mainhatten Wheels	V5	1^{4}	1^{4}	1^{6}	Ret	1^{4}	1^{5}	2^{4}	Ret	27
65	(Germany) Ulrich Korn	(Germany) #444 Adrenalin Motorsport Team Mainhatten Wheels	V5	1^{4}	1^{4}	1^{6}	Ret	1^{4}	1^{5}	2^{4}	Ret	27
68	(Germany) Christian Kraus	(Germany) #652 Adrenalin Motorsport Team Mainhatten Wheels	M240i					2^{6}	2^{5}	3^{8}	3^{8}	27
69	(Germany) Richard Jodexnis	(Germany) #181 SRS Team Sorg Rennsport	SP10	7^{2}	NC	7^{2}	4^{6}	6^{3}	7^{3}	3^{8}	4^{3}	25 (27)
70	(Turkey) Mustafa Mehmet Kaya	(Germany) #103 Black Falcon	CUP2	12^{1}	5^{4}	5^{4}	5^{4}	5^{4}	7^{3}	4^{6}		25 (26)
70	(Germany) Mike Stursberg	(Germany) #103 Black Falcon	CUP2	12^{1}	5^{4}	5^{4}	5^{4}	5^{4}	7^{3}	4^{6}		25 (26)
72	(Germany) Achim Wawer	(Germany) #184/165 Schmickler Performance powered by Ravenol	SP10	3^{8}	3^{8}	3^{8}	Ret			Ret		24
73	(Denmark) Kaj Schubert	(Germany) #505 (BMW 328i)	VT2-R+4WD	Ret	6^{3}	3^{8}	WD	2^{11}	10^{1}			23
74	(Germany) Roland Froese	(Germany) #930 Adrenalin Motorsport Team Mainhatten Wheels	CUP3	4^{6}	3^{8}	3^{8}	9^{1}					23
75	(Germany) Tobias Wahl	(Germany) #191 Walkenhorst Racing	SP10	5^{4}	4^{6}	DNS	6^{3}		3^{10}			23
76	(Germany) Christian Büllesbach	(Germany) #396 Adrenalin Motorsport Team Mainhatten Wheels	V6	1^{3}	1^{3}	1^{4}	1^{4}	1^{3}	1^{5}	2^{3}	1^{3}	22 (28)
76	(Germany) Lutz Rühl	(Germany) #396 Adrenalin Motorsport Team Mainhatten Wheels	V6	1^{3}	1^{3}	1^{4}	1^{4}	1^{3}	1^{5}	2^{3}	1^{3}	22 (28)
76	(Germany) Andreas Schettler	(Germany) #396 Adrenalin Motorsport Team Mainhatten Wheels	V6	1^{3}	1^{3}	1^{4}	1^{4}	1^{3}	1^{5}	2^{3}	1^{3}	22 (28)
79	(Germany) Pascal Fritzsche	(Germany) #499 Keeevin Sports and Racing	VT2-FWD	Ret	Ret	Ret	2^{11}	Ret				22
79	(Germany) Pascal Fritzsche	(Germany) #494 (Volkswagen Golf 8 GTI Clubsport)	VT2-FWD							2^{11}	Ret	22
79	(Germany) Thomas Schönfeld	(Germany) #499 Keeevin Sports and Racing	VT2-FWD	Ret	Ret	Ret	2^{11}	Ret				22
79	(Germany) Thomas Schönfeld	(Germany) #494 (Volkswagen Golf 8 GTI Clubsport)	VT2-FWD							2^{11}	Ret	22
Pos.	Driver	Team	Class	NLS1	NLS2	24H-Q1	24H-Q2	NLS3	NLS4	NLS5	NLS6	Points

=== SP9 Pro-Am ===
Pos.	Drivers	Team	NLS1	NLS2	24H-Q1	24H-Q2	NLS3	NLS4	NLS5	NLS6	Points
1	(Germany) Michael Heimrich	(Germany) #50 équipe vitesse			4^{(6)}‡	4^{(6)}‡				1^{2}	2 (14)
1	(Germany) Arno Klasen	(Germany) #50 équipe vitesse			4^{(6)}‡	4^{(6)}‡				1^{2}	2 (14)
Pos.	Drivers	Team	NLS1	NLS2	24H-Q1	24H-Q2	NLS3	NLS4	NLS5	NLS6	Points

‡: Result not counted for classification

=== SP9 Am ===
Pos.	Drivers	Team	NLS1	NLS2	24H-Q1	24H-Q2	NLS3	NLS4	NLS5	NLS6	Points
1	(Germany) Michael Heimrich	(Germany) #50 équipe vitesse	2^{3}	2^{3}	2^{3}	2^{3}	1^{3}	1^{4}	2^{2}		19 (21)
1	(Germany) Arno Klasen	(Germany) #50 équipe vitesse	2^{3}	2^{3}	2^{3}	2^{3}	1^{3}	1^{4}	2^{2}		19 (21)
3	(Germany) Alexey Veremenko (Note: Veremenko and "Selv" are Russians, but are competing under German license as Russian national emblems were banned by the FIA due to the Russian invasion of Ukraine.)	(Lithuania) #8/71 Juta Racing	1^{4}	Ret	1^{4}	1^{4}	Ret	Ret	1^{3}	Ret	15
3	(Germany) "Selv"	(Lithuania) #8/71 Juta Racing	1^{4}	Ret	1^{4}	1^{4}	Ret	Ret	1^{3}	Ret	15
3	(Switzerland) Lorenzo Rocco	(Germany) #50 équipe vitesse	2^{3}	2^{3}			1^{3}	1^{4}	2^{2}		15
6	(Germany) Danny Kubasik / "Dieter Schmidtmann"	(Thailand) #786 Renazzo Motor with mcchip-dkr	3^{2}	1^{4}							6
7	(Germany) Pierre Lemmerz	(Germany) #20 Up2Race								1^{3}	3
Pos.	Drivers	Team	NLS1	NLS2	24H-Q1	24H-Q2	NLS3	NLS4	NLS5	NLS6	Points

=== SP10 ===
Pos.	Drivers	Team	NLS1	NLS2	24H-Q1	24H-Q2	NLS3	NLS4	NLS5	NLS6	Points
1	(Germany) Tim Sandtler	(Germany) #170 Toyo Tires with Ring Racing	1^{15}	2^{11}	1^{15}	Ret	1^{15}	4^{8}	1^{15}		79 (85)
1	(Germany) Tim Sandtler	(Germany) #171 Toyo Tires with Ring Racing								2^{6}	79 (85)
2	(Germany) Andreas Gülden	(Germany) #170 Toyo Tires with Ring Racing	1^{15}	2^{11}	1^{15}	Ret	1^{15}	4^{8}	1^{15}		79
2	(Germany) Marc Hennerici	(Germany) #170 Toyo Tires with Ring Racing	1^{15}	2^{11}	1^{15}	Ret	1^{15}	4^{8}	1^{15}		79
4	(Norway) Oskar Sandberg	(Germany) #169 Dörr Motorsport	2^{11}	1^{15}			Ret	2^{14}	Ret	1^{8}	48
4	(Germany) Nick Wüstenhagen	(Germany) #169 Dörr Motorsport	2^{11}	1^{15}			Ret	2^{14}	Ret	1^{8}	48
6	(Germany) Michael Tischner	(Germany) #171 Toyo Tires with Ring Racing	8^{1}	5^{4}	2^{11}	2^{11}	3^{8}	6^{4}			39
7	(Switzerland) Ivan Jacoma	(Germany) #184/165 Schmickler Performance powered by Ravenol	3^{8}	3^{8}	3^{8}	Ret	2^{11}		Ret	Ret	35
7	(Germany) Claudius Karch	(Germany) #184/165 Schmickler Performance powered by Ravenol	3^{8}	3^{8}	3^{8}	Ret	2^{11}		Ret	Ret	35
7	(Germany) Kai Riemer	(Germany) #184/165 Schmickler Performance powered by Ravenol	3^{8}	3^{8}	3^{8}	Ret	2^{11}		Ret	Ret	35
10	(Germany) Aaron Wenisch	(Germany) #169 Dörr Motorsport	2^{11}	1^{15}			Ret		Ret	1^{8}	34
11	(Germany) Richard Jodexnis	(Germany) #181 SRS Team Sorg Rennsport	7^{2}	NC	7^{2}	4^{6}	6^{3}	7^{3}	3^{8}	4^{3}	25 (27)
12	(Germany) Achim Wawer	(Germany) #184/165 Schmickler Performance powered by Ravenol	3^{8}	3^{8}	3^{8}	Ret			Ret		24
13	(Germany) Tobias Wahl	(Germany) #191 Walkenhorst Racing	5^{4}	4^{6}	DNS	6^{3}		3^{10}			23
14	(Belgium) Aris Balanian	(Germany) #191 Walkenhorst Racing	5^{4}	4^{6}	DNS	6^{3}	4^{6}				19
14	(Belgium) Aris Balanian	(Germany) #179 Dörr Motorsport						Ret			19
15	(Germany) Stephan Brodmerkel	(Germany) #164 AVIA W&S Motorsport	6^{3}		8^{1}	5^{4}	7^{2}	Ret	4^{6}		16
15	(Germany) Jürgen Vöhringer	(Germany) #164 AVIA W&S Motorsport	6^{3}		8^{1}	5^{4}	7^{2}	Ret	4^{6}		16
Pos.	Drivers	Team	NLS1	NLS2	24H-Q1	24H-Q2	NLS3	NLS4	NLS5	NLS6	Points

=== SP-Pro ===
Pos.	Drivers	Team	NLS1	NLS2	24H-Q1	24H-Q2	NLS3	NLS4	NLS5	NLS6	Points
1	(Germany) Andreas Gülden	(Germany) #347 Toyo Tires with Ring Racing						1^{3}‡	DNS	1^{2}	2 (5)
1	(Germany) Marc Hennerici	(Germany) #347 Toyo Tires with Ring Racing						1^{3}‡	DNS	1^{2}	2 (5)
Pos.	Drivers	Team	NLS1	NLS2	24H-Q1	24H-Q2	NLS3	NLS4	NLS5	NLS6	Points

=== SP8T ===
Pos.	Drivers	Team	NLS1	NLS2	24H-Q1	24H-Q2	NLS3	NLS4	NLS5	NLS6	Points
1	(Norway) Oskar Sandberg	(Germany) #169 Dörr Motorsport			1^{11}	1^{8}					19
1	(Germany) Aaron Wenisch	(Germany) #169 Dörr Motorsport			1^{11}	1^{8}					19
1	(Germany) Nick Wüstenhagen	(Germany) #169 Dörr Motorsport			1^{11}	1^{8}					19
Pos.	Drivers	Team	NLS1	NLS2	24H-Q1	24H-Q2	NLS3	NLS4	NLS5	NLS6	Points

=== SP7 ===
Pos.	Drivers	Team	NLS1	NLS2	24H-Q1	24H-Q2	NLS3	NLS4	NLS5	NLS6	Points
1	(Germany) Fabio Sacchi	(Germany) #80 Plusline Racing Team	1^{2}	1^{2}	1^{2}	1^{2}	1^{2}	3^{5}	1^{4}		17 (19)
2	(Germany) Reiner Neuffer	(Germany) #80 Plusline Racing Team	1^{2}		1^{2}	1^{2}	1^{2}	3^{5}			13
Pos.	Drivers	Team	NLS1	NLS2	24H-Q1	24H-Q2	NLS3	NLS4	NLS5	NLS6	Points

=== SP3T ===
Pos.	Drivers	Team	NLS1	NLS2	24H-Q1	24H-Q2	NLS3	NLS4	NLS5	NLS6	Points
1	(Germany) Oliver Kriese	(Germany) #300/318 Ollis Garage			1^{2}	2^{2}	3^{2}	1^{4}	3^{4}	2^{2}	16
2	(Germany) Danny Brink	(Germany) #313 Sharky Racing							1^{8}		8
3	(Germany) Matthias Wasel	(Germany) #819 Max Kruse Racing								1^{3}	3
4	(Germany) Wolfgang Haugg	(Germany) #311 2R Racing	1^{2}								2
Pos.	Drivers	Team	NLS1	NLS2	24H-Q1	24H-Q2	NLS3	NLS4	NLS5	NLS6	Points

=== AT(-G) ===
Pos.	Drivers	Team	NLS1	NLS2	24H-Q1	24H-Q2	NLS3	NLS4	NLS5	NLS6	Points
1	(Germany) Matthias Wasel	(Germany) #10 Max Kruse Racing	Ret	WD	1^{6}	3^{2}	1^{2}	Ret	4^{6}		16 (17)
1	(Germany) Matthias Wasel	(Germany) #333 Max Kruse Racing			2^{(4)}	2^{(3)}					16 (17)
1	(Germany) Matthias Wasel	(Germany) #819 Max Kruse Racing							6^{(3)}		16 (17)
1	(Germany) Timo Hochwind	(Germany) #10 Max Kruse Racing	Ret	WD	1^{6}	3^{2}	1^{2}	Ret	4^{6}		16 (21)
1	(Germany) Timo Hochwind	(Germany) #333 Max Kruse Racing							2^{(11)}		16 (21)
3	(Turkey) Emir Asari	(Germany) #10 Max Kruse Racing	Ret	WD	1^{6}	3^{2}		Ret			8
3	(Turkey) Emir Asari	(Germany) #333 Max Kruse Racing			2^{(4)}	2^{(3)}					8
Pos.	Drivers	Team	NLS1	NLS2	24H-Q1	24H-Q2	NLS3	NLS4	NLS5	NLS6	Points

=== TCR ===
Pos.	Drivers	Team	NLS1	NLS2	24H-Q1	24H-Q2	NLS3	NLS4	NLS5	NLS6	Points
1	(Norway) Håkon Schjærin	(Norway) #801 Møller Bil Motorsport	1^{6}		2^{11}		1^{3}		1^{8}		28
2	(Germany) Sebastian Schemmann	(Germany) #800 asBest Racing	3^{3}	2^{2}	7^{2}	4^{4}		2^{4}	4^{3}		18
3	(Germany) Joachim Nett	(Germany) #821 Bonk Motorsport						3^{3}	Ret		3
3	(Germany) Jürgen Nett	(Germany) #821 Bonk Motorsport						3^{3}	Ret		3
3	(Germany) Timo Beuth	(Germany) #821 Bonk Motorsport						3^{3}			3
Pos.	Drivers	Team	NLS1	NLS2	24H-Q1	24H-Q2	NLS3	NLS4	NLS5	NLS6	Points

=== V6 ===
Pos.	Drivers	Team	NLS1	NLS2	24H-Q1	24H-Q2	NLS3	NLS4	NLS5	NLS6	Points
1	(Germany) Christian Büllesbach	(Germany) #396 Adrenalin Motorsport Team Mainhatten Wheels	1^{3}	1^{3}	1^{4}	1^{4}	1^{3}	1^{5}	2^{3}	1^{3}	22 (28)
1	(Germany) Lutz Rühl	(Germany) #396 Adrenalin Motorsport Team Mainhatten Wheels	1^{3}	1^{3}	1^{4}	1^{4}	1^{3}	1^{5}	2^{3}	1^{3}	22 (28)
1	(Germany) Andreas Schettler	(Germany) #396 Adrenalin Motorsport Team Mainhatten Wheels	1^{3}	1^{3}	1^{4}	1^{4}	1^{3}	1^{5}	2^{3}	1^{3}	22 (28)
4	(Germany) David Ackermann	(Germany) #410 rent2Drive Racing	2^{2}	2^{2}	2^{3}	3^{2}	2^{2}	3^{3}	3^{2}	2^{2}	14 (18)
Pos.	Drivers	Team	NLS1	NLS2	24H-Q1	24H-Q2	NLS3	NLS4	NLS5	NLS6	Points

=== V5 ===
Pos.	Drivers	Team	NLS1	NLS2	24H-Q1	24H-Q2	NLS3	NLS4	NLS5	NLS6	Points
1	(Germany) Daniel Korn	(Germany) #444 Adrenalin Motorsport Team Mainhatten Wheels	1^{4}	1^{4}	1^{6}	Ret	1^{4}	1^{5}	2^{4}	Ret	27
1	(Germany) Tobias Korn	(Germany) #444 Adrenalin Motorsport Team Mainhatten Wheels	1^{4}	1^{4}	1^{6}	Ret	1^{4}	1^{5}	2^{4}	Ret	27
1	(Germany) Ulrich Korn	(Germany) #444 Adrenalin Motorsport Team Mainhatten Wheels	1^{4}	1^{4}	1^{6}	Ret	1^{4}	1^{5}	2^{4}	Ret	27
Pos.	Drivers	Team	NLS1	NLS2	24H-Q1	24H-Q2	NLS3	NLS4	NLS5	NLS6	Points

=== V4 ===
Pos.	Drivers	Team	NLS1	NLS2	24H-Q1	24H-Q2	NLS3	NLS4	NLS5	NLS6	Points
1	(Germany) Florian Kramer	(United States) #731 Plusline Racing Team			2^{4}	1^{8}	3^{8}	1^{19}	1^{8}	2^{8}	55
1	(Germany) Romano Schultz	(United States) #731 Plusline Racing Team			2^{4}	1^{8}	3^{8}	1^{19}	1^{8}	2^{8}	55
3	(Germany) Desiree Müller	(Germany) #701/711 EiFelkind Racing Team	2^{6}	2^{6}	DNS	4^{3}	1^{15}	2^{14}	3^{4}	DSQ	45 (48)
3	(Germany) Tim Lukas Müller	(Germany) #701/711 EiFelkind Racing Team	2^{6}	2^{6}	DNS	4^{3}	1^{15}	2^{14}	3^{4}	DSQ	45 (48)
5	(Sweden) Dan Berghult	(Germany) #703/750 Keeevin Sports and Racing	1^{8}	DNS	3^{3}	3^{4}	4^{6}	4^{8}	2^{6}	1^{11}	43 (46)
5	(Brazil) Flavia Pellegrino Fernandes	(Germany) #703/750 Keeevin Sports and Racing	1^{8}	DNS	3^{3}	3^{4}	4^{6}	4^{8}	2^{6}	1^{11}	43 (46)
5	(Finland) Juha Miettinen	(Germany) #703/750 Keeevin Sports and Racing	1^{8}	DNS	3^{3}	3^{4}	4^{6}	4^{8}	2^{6}	1^{11}	43 (46)
8	(Germany) Oliver Frisse	(Germany) #700/702 IFB powered by QTQ Race Performance	Ret	1^{8}	1^{6}	2^{6}	Ret	3^{10}			30
8	(Germany) Jürgen Huber	(Germany) #700/702 IFB powered by QTQ Race Performance	Ret	1^{8}	1^{6}	2^{6}	Ret	3^{10}			30
8	(Germany) Simon Sagmeister	(Germany) #700/702 IFB powered by QTQ Race Performance	Ret	1^{8}	1^{6}	2^{6}	Ret	3^{10}			30
11	(Germany) Markus Löw	(United States) #747 Rockstar Games By Viken Motorsport	3^{4}	4^{3}	4^{2}	5^{2}				5^{3}	14
11	(United Kingdom) Benjamin Lyons	(United States) #747 Rockstar Games By Viken Motorsport	3^{4}	4^{3}	4^{2}	5^{2}				5^{3}	14
Pos.	Drivers	Team	NLS1	NLS2	24H-Q1	24H-Q2	NLS3	NLS4	NLS5	NLS6	Points

=== VT3 ===
Pos.	Drivers	Team	NLS1	NLS2	24H-Q1	24H-Q2	NLS3	NLS4	NLS5	NLS6	Points
1	(Germany) Jörg Schönfelder	(Germany) #460 Keeevin Sports and Racing						1^{3}			3
2	(Germany) Serge van Vooren	(Germany) #460 Keeevin Sports and Racing					1^{2}				2
Pos.	Drivers	Team	NLS1	NLS2	24H-Q1	24H-Q2	NLS3	NLS4	NLS5	NLS6	Points

=== VT2-FWD ===
Pos.	Drivers	Team	NLS1	NLS2	24H-Q1	24H-Q2	NLS3	NLS4	NLS5	NLS6	Points
1	(United Kingdom) Joshua Hislop	(Germany) #491 Mertens Motorsport	1^{15}	1^{15}	1^{15}	NC	1^{15}	1^{14}	6^{3}	2^{11}	85 (88)
1	(United Kingdom) Joshua Hislop	(Germany) #496 Mertens Motorsport								5^{(4)}	85 (88)
1	(Germany) Daniel Mertens	(Germany) #491 Mertens Motorsport	1^{15}	1^{15}	1^{15}	NC	1^{15}	1^{14}	6^{3}	2^{11}	85 (88)
1	(Germany) Daniel Mertens	(Germany) #496 Mertens Motorsport					5^{(4)}				85 (88)
3	(India) Akshay Gupta	(Germany) #492 Mertens Motorsport	5^{4}	5^{4}	3^{8}	Ret	Ret	2^{10}	1^{15}	1^{15}	56
3	(Germany) Alex Georg Schneider	(Germany) #492 Mertens Motorsport	5^{4}	5^{4}	3^{8}	Ret	Ret	2^{10}	1^{15}	1^{15}	56
5	(Germany) Michael Eichhorn	(Germany) #469 Auto Thomas by Jung Motorsport	2^{11}	Ret							56
5	(Germany) Michael Eichhorn	(Germany) #470 Auto Thomas by Jung Motorsport					2^{11}		3^{8}	Ret	56
5	(Germany) Michael Eichhorn	(Germany) #495 Auto Thomas by Jung Motorsport			2^{11}	1^{15}					56
5	(Germany) Tobias Jung	(Germany) #469 Auto Thomas by Jung Motorsport	2^{11}	Ret			4^{(6)}				56
5	(Germany) Tobias Jung	(Germany) #470 Auto Thomas by Jung Motorsport	DNS				2^{11}		3^{8}	Ret	56
5	(Germany) Tobias Jung	(Germany) #495 Auto Thomas by Jung Motorsport			2^{11}	1^{15}					56
7	(Germany) Andreas Winterwerber	(Germany) #495 Auto Thomas by Jung Motorsport			2^{11}	1^{15}					45
7	(Germany) Andreas Winterwerber	(Germany) #470 Auto Thomas by Jung Motorsport					2^{11}		3^{8}	Ret	45
8	(Germany) Pascal Fritzsche	(Germany) #499 Keeevin Sports and Racing	Ret	Ret	Ret	2^{11}	Ret				22
8	(Germany) Pascal Fritzsche	(Germany) #494 (Volkswagen Golf 8 GTI Clubsport)							2^{11}	Ret	22
8	(Germany) Thomas Schönfeld	(Germany) #499 Keeevin Sports and Racing	Ret	Ret	Ret	2^{11}	Ret				22
8	(Germany) Thomas Schönfeld	(Germany) #494 (Volkswagen Golf 8 GTI Clubsport)							2^{11}	Ret	22
10	(Germany) Timo Beuth	(Germany) #476 Sharky Racing	3^{8}	3^{8}	Ret	WD					16
10	(Germany) Danny Brink	(Germany) #476 Sharky Racing	3^{8}	3^{8}	Ret	WD					16
10	(Germany) Joachim Nett	(Germany) #476 Sharky Racing	3^{8}	3^{8}	Ret	WD					16
10	(Germany) Jürgen Nett	(Germany) #476 Sharky Racing	3^{8}	3^{8}	Ret	WD					16
10	(Germany) Niklas Walter	(Germany) #492 Mertens Motorsport	5^{4}	5^{4}	3^{8}	Ret	Ret				16
15	(Germany) Carsten Erpenbach	(Germany) #496 Mertens Motorsport	8^{1}	DNS				Ret	Ret		12
15	(Germany) Carsten Erpenbach	(Germany) #493 Mertens Motorsport			6^{3}	3^{8}					12
Pos.	Drivers	Team	NLS1	NLS2	24H-Q1	24H-Q2	NLS3	NLS4	NLS5	NLS6	Points

=== VT2-R+4WD ===
Pos.	Drivers	Team	NLS1	NLS2	24H-Q1	24H-Q2	NLS3	NLS4	NLS5	NLS6	Points
1	(Israel) Moran Gott	(Germany) #1/500 Adrenalin Motorsport Team Mainhatten Wheels	1^{15}	7^{2}	1^{15}	1^{15}	Ret	Ret	1^{15}	1^{15}	77
1	(Germany) Philipp Leisen	(Germany) #1/500 Adrenalin Motorsport Team Mainhatten Wheels	1^{15}	7^{2}	1^{15}	1^{15}	Ret	Ret	1^{15}	1^{15}	77
1	(Germany) Daniel Zils	(Germany) #1/500 Adrenalin Motorsport Team Mainhatten Wheels	1^{15}	7^{2}	1^{15}	1^{15}	Ret	Ret	1^{15}	1^{15}	77
4	(Netherlands) Piet-Jan Ooms	(Germany) #504 SRS Team Sorg Rennsport	3^{8}	2^{11}	2^{11}	3^{8}	3^{8}	1^{19}	4^{6}	3^{8}	65 (79)
5	(Germany) "Sub7BTG"	(Germany) #501 Adrenalin Motorsport Team Mainhatten Wheels	4^{6}	5^{4}	4^{6}	2^{11}		4^{8}	8^{1}		36
6	(Denmark) Kaj Schubert	(Germany) #505 (BMW 328i)	Ret	6^{3}	3^{8}	WD	2^{11}	10^{1}			23
7	(Austria) Maximilian Malinowski	(Germany) #510 Dupré Engineering	7^{2}	Ret	5^{4}	Ret			Ret		7
7	(Austria) Maximilian Malinowski	(Germany) #511 Dupré Engineering					10^{1}				7
8	(Germany) Christoph Dupré	(Germany) #510 Dupré Engineering	7^{2}	Ret	5^{4}	Ret	Ret		Ret		6
9	(Germany) Jacob Erlbacher	(Germany) #510 Dupré Engineering	7^{2}	Ret							2
Pos.	Drivers	Team	NLS1	NLS2	24H-Q1	24H-Q2	NLS3	NLS4	NLS5	NLS6	Points

=== NLS Cup2 ===
Pos.	Drivers	Team	NLS1	NLS2	24H-Q1	24H-Q2	NLS3	NLS4	NLS5	NLS6	Points
1	(Germany) Tobias Müller	(Germany) #148 Black Falcon Team 48 LOSCH	4^{6}	1^{15}	1^{15}	3^{8}	3^{8}	1^{19}	1^{15}		83 (97)
1	(Germany) Tobias Müller	(Germany) #103 Black Falcon	12^{(1)}	5^{(4)}						2^{11}	83 (97)
2	(Germany) Daniel Blickle	(Germany) #120 AVIA W&S Motorsport	1^{15}	Ret	2^{11}	4^{6}	2^{11}	2^{14}	2^{11}	1^{15}	77 (83)
2	(Germany) David Jahn	(Germany) #120 AVIA W&S Motorsport	1^{15}	Ret	2^{11}	4^{6}	2^{11}	2^{14}	2^{11}	1^{15}	77 (83)
2	(Germany) Tim Scheerbarth	(Germany) #120 AVIA W&S Motorsport	1^{15}	Ret	2^{11}	4^{6}	2^{11}	2^{14}	2^{11}	1^{15}	77 (83)
5	(Luxembourg) Steve Jans	(Germany) #148 Black Falcon Team 48 LOSCH	4^{6}	1^{15}	1^{15}	3^{8}	3^{8}	1^{19}			76 (82)
5	(Luxembourg) Steve Jans	(Germany) #103 Black Falcon								2^{11}	76 (82)
6	(Germany) Noah Nagelsdiek	(Germany) #148 Black Falcon Team 48 LOSCH	4^{6}	1^{15}	1^{15}	3^{8}			1^{15}		70
6	(Germany) Noah Nagelsdiek	(Germany) #103 Black Falcon								2^{11}	70
7	(Germany) Ben Bünnagel	(Belgium) #122 Mühlner Motorsport	2^{11}	3^{8}	4^{6}	2^{11}	4^{6}	4^{8}	Ret	3^{8}	52 (58)
8	(Germany) Christopher Brück	(Germany) #121 KKrämer Racing	3^{8}	NC	7^{2}	1^{15}	Ret	3^{10}	3^{8}	Ret	43
8	(Germany) Christopher Brück	(Germany) #112 KKrämer Racing					Ret				43
8	(Germany) Michele Di Martino	(Germany) #121 KKrämer Racing	3^{8}	NC	7^{2}	1^{15}	Ret	3^{10}	3^{8}	Ret	43
10	(Germany) Peter Terting	(Belgium) #124 Mühlner Motorsport	11^{1}	2^{11}	3^{8}	Ret	1^{15}	6^{4}			39
11	(Germany) Moritz Kranz	(Belgium) #122 Mühlner Motorsport	2^{(11)}	3^{(8)}	4^{6}	2^{(11)}	4^{6}	4^{8}	Ret		32 (55)
11	(Germany) Moritz Kranz	(Belgium) #124 Mühlner Motorsport	11^{1}	2^{11}	3^{(8)}	Ret					32 (55)
12	(Turkey) Mustafa Mehmet Kaya	(Germany) #103 Black Falcon	12^{1}	5^{4}	5^{4}	5^{4}	5^{4}	7^{3}	4^{6}		25 (26)
12	(Germany) Mike Stursberg	(Germany) #103 Black Falcon	12^{1}	5^{4}	5^{4}	5^{4}	5^{4}	7^{3}	4^{6}		25 (26)
14	(Germany) Karsten Krämer	(Germany) #112 KKrämer Racing	6^{3}	4^{6}	6^{3}	6^{3}	Ret	8^{1}	7^{2}	5^{4}	21 (22)
14	(Germany) Fidel Leib Jun.	(Germany) #112 KKrämer Racing	6^{3}	4^{6}	6^{3}	6^{3}	Ret	8^{1}	7^{2}	5^{4}	21 (22)
16	(Germany) Tobias Vazquez-Garcia	(Belgium) #123 Mühlner Motorsport	9^{1}	10^{1}	9^{1}	8^{1}	7^{2}	9^{1}	5^{4}	4^{6}	15 (17)
17	(Germany) Robin Chrzanowski	(Germany) #119 Clickversicherungs Team	7^{2}	7^{2}	8^{1}	7^{2}		10^{1}	6^{3}		11
17	(Germany) Kersten Jodexnis	(Germany) #119 Clickversicherungs Team	7^{2}	7^{2}	8^{1}	7^{2}		10^{1}	6^{3}		11
19	(Germany) Benjamin Leuchter	(Germany) #100 Max Kruse Racing	5^{4}	DNS							4
19	(Germany) Nicholas Otto	(Germany) #100 Max Kruse Racing	5^{4}	DNS							4
19	(Germany) Nicholas Otto	(Germany) #105 Max Kruse Racing					Ret				4
19	(Germany) Mike Halder	(Germany) #117 Halder Motorsport	8^{1}	6^{3}							4
19	(Germany) Stefan Kiefer	(Germany) #131 Teichmann Racing	10^{1}	9^{1}	13^{1}	Ret		11^{1}			4
Pos.	Drivers	Team	NLS1	NLS2	24H-Q1	24H-Q2	NLS3	NLS4	NLS5	NLS6	Points

=== NLS Cup3 ===
Pos.	Drivers	Team	NLS1	NLS2	24H-Q1	24H-Q2	NLS3	NLS4	NLS5	NLS6	Points
1	(Germany) Joshua Bednarski	(Germany) #962 AVIA W&S Motorsport	2^{11}	1^{15}	1^{15}	1^{15}	1^{15}	1^{19}	WD	Ret	90
1	(Germany) Lucas Daugaard	(Germany) #962 AVIA W&S Motorsport	2^{11}	1^{15}	1^{15}	1^{15}	1^{15}	1^{19}	WD	Ret	90
1	(Germany) Moritz Oberheim	(Germany) #962 AVIA W&S Motorsport	2^{11}	1^{15}	1^{15}	1^{15}	1^{15}	1^{19}	WD	Ret	90
4	(Germany) Heiko Eichenberg	(Germany) #959 SRS Team Sorg Rennsport	1^{15}	Ret	Ret	2^{11}	2^{11}	3^{10}	1^{15}	1^{15}	77
4	(Germany) Fabio Grosse	(Germany) #959 SRS Team Sorg Rennsport	1^{15}	Ret	Ret	2^{11}	2^{11}	3^{10}	1^{15}	1^{15}	77
4	(Germany) Patrik Grütter	(Germany) #959 SRS Team Sorg Rennsport	1^{15}	Ret	Ret	2^{11}	2^{11}	3^{10}	1^{15}	1^{15}	77
7	(Germany) Horst Baumann	(Germany) #950 Schmickler Performance powered by Ravenol	3^{8}	2^{11}	4^{6}	3^{8}	7^{2}		2^{11}	3^{8}	52 (54)
8	(Denmark) Mads Gravsen	(Germany) #949 SRS Team Sorg Rennsport	Ret	4^{6}	2^{11}	5^{4}	3^{8}	2^{14}	9^{1}	4^{6}	49 (50)
8	(United Kingdom) Harley Haughton	(Germany) #949 SRS Team Sorg Rennsport	Ret	4^{6}	2^{11}	5^{4}	3^{8}	2^{14}	9^{1}	4^{6}	49 (50)
10	(Austria) David Griessner	(Germany) #930 Adrenalin Motorsport Team Mainhatten Wheels	4^{6}	3^{8}	3^{8}	9^{1}	Ret	5^{5}	Ret	11^{1}	29
10	(Germany) Stefan Kruse	(Germany) #930 Adrenalin Motorsport Team Mainhatten Wheels	4^{6}	3^{8}	3^{8}	9^{1}	Ret	5^{5}	Ret	11^{1}	29
12	(Ukraine) Oleksii Kikireshko	(Germany) #969 SRS Team Sorg Rennsport	Ret	5^{4}	5^{4}	7^{2}	5^{4}	6^{4}	3^{8}	5^{4}	28 (30)
13	(Germany) Roland Froese	(Germany) #930 Adrenalin Motorsport Team Mainhatten Wheels	4^{6}	3^{8}	3^{8}	9^{1}					23
14	(Germany) Leonard Oehme	(Germany) #944 Team Oehme					6^{3}	4^{8}	5^{4}	8^{1}	16
14	(Germany) Moritz Oehme	(Germany) #944 Team Oehme					6^{3}	4^{8}	5^{4}	8^{1}	16
16	(Germany) Markus Nölken	(Germany) / (Thailand) #945 mcchip-dkr / Renazzo Motorsport Team	5^{4}	6^{3}	7^{2}		8^{1}		6^{3}		13
17	(Germany) Niklas Oehme	(Germany) #944 Team Oehme					6^{3}			8^{1}	4
Pos.	Drivers	Team	NLS1	NLS2	24H-Q1	24H-Q2	NLS3	NLS4	NLS5	NLS6	Points

=== Porsche Endurance Trophy Nürburgring Cup2 ===
Pos.	Drivers	Team	NLS1	NLS2	24H-Q1	24H-Q2	NLS3	NLS4	NLS5	NLS6	Points
1	(Germany) Tobias Müller	(Germany) #148 Black Falcon Team 48 LOSCH	4	1	1	3	3	1	1		128 (156)
1	(Germany) Tobias Müller	(Germany) #103 Black Falcon	12	5						2	128 (156)
2	(Germany) Daniel Blickle	(Germany) #120 AVIA W&S Motorsport	1	Ret	2	4	2	2	2	1	122.5 (135.5)
2	(Germany) David Jahn	(Germany) #120 AVIA W&S Motorsport	1	Ret	2	4	2	2	2	1	122.5 (135.5)
2	(Germany) Tim Scheerbarth	(Germany) #120 AVIA W&S Motorsport	1	Ret	2	4	2	2	2	1	122.5 (135.5)
3	(Luxembourg) Steve Jans	(Germany) #148 Black Falcon Team 48 LOSCH	4	1	1	3	3	1			121 (134)
3	(Luxembourg) Steve Jans	(Germany) #103 Black Falcon								2	121 (134)
4	(Germany) Noah Nagelsdiek	(Germany) #148 Black Falcon Team 48 LOSCH	4	1	1	3			1		97 (110)
4	(Germany) Noah Nagelsdiek	(Germany) #103 Black Falcon							2		97 (110)
5	(Germany) Ben Bünnagel	(Belgium) #122 Mühlner Motorsport	2	3	4	2	4	4	Ret	3	96.5 (109.5)
6	(Germany) Arne Hoffmeister	(Belgium) #122 Mühlner Motorsport			4	2					91.5
6	(Germany) Arne Hoffmeister	(Belgium) #124 Mühlner Motorsport					1	6			91.5
6	(Germany) Arne Hoffmeister	(Belgium) #123 Mühlner Motorsport							5	4	91.5
7	(Germany) Christopher Brück	(Germany) #121 KKrämer Racing	3	NC	7	1	Ret	3	3	Ret	81.5
7	(Germany) Christopher Brück	(Germany) #112 KKrämer Racing					Ret				81.5
7	(Germany) Michele Di Martino	(Germany) #121 KKrämer Racing	3	NC	7	1	Ret	3	3	Ret	81.5
8	(Germany) Peter Terting	(Belgium) #124 Mühlner Motorsport	11	2	3	Ret	1	6			74.5
9	(Germany) Moritz Kranz	(Belgium) #122 Mühlner Motorsport	2	3	4	2	4	4	Ret		69.5
9	(Germany) Moritz Kranz	(Belgium) #124 Mühlner Motorsport	11	2	3	Ret					69.5
10	(Germany) Karsten Krämer	(Germany) #112 KKrämer Racing	6	4	6	6	Ret	8	7	5	67.5 (76.5)
10	(Germany) Fidel Leib Jun.	(Germany) #112 KKrämer Racing	6	4	6	6	Ret	8	7	5	67.5 (76.5)
11	(United Kingdom) Alex Brundle	(Belgium) #122 Mühlner Motorsport	2	3				4		3	66.5
12	(Turkey) Mustafa Mehmet Kaya	(Germany) #103 Black Falcon	12	5	5	5	5	7	4		62 (79)
12	(Germany) Mike Stursberg	(Germany) #103 Black Falcon	12	5	5	5	5	7	4		62 (79)
13	(Germany) Tobias Vazquez-Garcia	(Belgium) #123 Mühlner Motorsport	9	10	9	8	7	9	5	4	61 (74)
13	(Germany) Marcel Hoppe	(Belgium) #123 Mühlner Motorsport	9	10	9	8	7	9	5	4	61 (74)
14	(Germany) Robin Chrzanowski	(Germany) #119 Clickversicherungs Team	7	7	8	7		10	6		55.5
14	(Germany) Kersten Jodexnis	(Germany) #119 Clickversicherungs Team	7	7	8	7		10	6		55.5
15	(Switzerland) Gabriele Piana	(Germany) #103 Black Falcon			5	5	5	7			50
15	(Switzerland) Gabriele Piana	(Germany) #148 Black Falcon Team 48 LOSCH						1			50
16	(Netherlands) Tom Coronel	(Germany) #127 Max Kruse Racing		8	11	9		Ret	8		29
16	(Netherlands) Jan Jaap van Roon	(Germany) #127 Max Kruse Racing		8	11	9		Ret	8		29
17	(Germany) Nick Salewsky	(Germany) #119 Clickversicherungs Team			8	7		10			27.5
18	(Germany) David Kiefer	(Germany) #131 Teichmann Racing	10	9	13	Ret		11			26
18	(Germany) Marius Kiefer	(Germany) #131 Teichmann Racing	10	9	13	Ret		11			26
18	(Germany) Stefan Kiefer	(Germany) #131 Teichmann Racing	10	9	13	Ret		11			26
18	(Austria) Luca Rettenbacher	(Germany) #131 Teichmann Racing	10	9	13	Ret		11			26
19	(Estonia) Martin Rump	(Belgium) #124 Mühlner Motorsport						6	9	NC	23.5
20	(Germany) Bill Cameron	(Germany) #113 Team Cameron					8	12	10		22.5
20	(Germany) Jim Cameron	(Germany) #113 Team Cameron					8	12	10		22.5
21	(Portugal) Tiago Monteiro	(Germany) #127 Max Kruse Racing		8	11	9					21
22	(New Zealand) Peter Scharmach	(Germany) #119 Clickversicherungs Team						10	6		20.5
23	(Germany) Jan-Erik Slooten	(Germany) #112 KKrämer Racing			6	6					20
24	(France) Leo Messenger	(Belgium) #123 Mühlner Motorsport						9			19
24	(France) Leo Messenger	(Belgium) #124 Mühlner Motorsport							9	NC	19
25	(Germany) Mike Halder	(Germany) #117 Halder Motorsport	8	6							18
25	(Germany) Michelle Halder	(Germany) #117 Halder Motorsport	8	6							18
26	(Germany) Hendrik Still	(Germany) #112 KKrämer Racing						8			13.5
27	(United States) Peter Ludwig	(Belgium) #123 Mühlner Motorsport	9	10							13
27	(United Kingdom) Adam Christodoulou	(Germany) #103 Black Falcon							4		13
28	(Finland) Philip Miemois	(Belgium) #123 Mühlner Motorsport						9			12
29	(Germany) Nicholas Otto	(Germany) #100 Max Kruse Racing	5	DNS							11
29	(Germany) Nicholas Otto	(Germany) #105 Max Kruse Racing					Ret				11
29	(Germany) Benjamin Leuchter	(Germany) #100 Max Kruse Racing	5	DNS							11
29	(Germany) Ralf-Peter Bonk	(Germany) #106 pb-performance			12	10		Ret			11
29	(Netherlands) Marco van Ramshorst	(Germany) #106 pb-performance			12	10		Ret			11
30	(Poland) Patryk Krupinski	(Germany) #112 KKrämer Racing							7		9
31	(Germany) Michael Rebhan	(Belgium) #123 Mühlner Motorsport				8					8
32	(Netherlands) Paul Meijer	(Germany) #127 Max Kruse Racing				9					7
–	(Netherlands) Jos Menten	(Germany) #116 Scherer Sport PHX					Ret		Ret	Ret	0
–	(Luxembourg) Carlos Rivas	(Germany) #116 Scherer Sport PHX							Ret	Ret	0
–	(Germany) Hendrik von Danwitz	(Germany) #116 Scherer Sport PHX					Ret				0
Guest drivers ineligible for championship
–	(Germany) Dominik Fugel	(Germany) #105 Max Kruse Racing					Ret	5			–
–	(Germany) Marcel Fugel	(Germany) #105 Max Kruse Racing					Ret	5			–
–	(Germany) Thomas Kiefer	(Germany) #125 Huber Motorsport			10	Ret	6				–
–	(Germany) Hans Wehrmann	(Germany) #125 Huber Motorsport			10	Ret	6		NC		–
–	(Sweden) Niclas Jönsson	(Germany) #101 RPM Racing							11		–
–	(United States) Tracy Krohn	(Germany) #101 RPM Racing							11		–
–	(Germany) Joachim Thyssen	(Germany) #125 Huber Motorsport							NC		–
–	(Netherlands) Morris Schuring	(Germany) #104 Black Falcon			DNS	Ret					–
–	(Romania) Alexandru Vasilescu	(Germany) #104 Black Falcon			DNS	Ret					–
Pos.	Drivers	Team	NLS1	NLS2	24H-Q1	24H-Q2	NLS3	NLS4	NLS5	NLS6	Points

PETN Cup2 Am

Pos.	Drivers	Team	NLS1	NLS2	24H-Q1	24H-Q2	NLS3	NLS4	NLS5	NLS6	Points
1	(Turkey) Mustafa Mehmet Kaya	(Germany) #103 Black Falcon	12	5	5	5	5	7	4		127 (140)
1	(Germany) Mike Stursberg	(Germany) #103 Black Falcon	12	5	5	5	5	7	4		127 (140)
2	(Germany) Karsten Krämer	(Germany) #112 KKrämer Racing	6	4	6	6	Ret	8	7	5	119.5 (136.5)
2	(Germany) Fidel Leib Jun.	(Germany) #112 KKrämer Racing	6	4	6	6	Ret	8	7	5	119.5 (136.5)
3	(Germany) Stefan Kiefer	(Germany) #131 Teichmann Racing	10	9	13	Ret		11			62.5
3	(Germany) David Kiefer	(Germany) #131 Teichmann Racing	10	9	13	Ret		11			62.5
3	(Germany) Marius Kiefer	(Germany) #131 Teichmann Racing	10	9	13	Ret		11			62.5
4	(Germany) Bill Cameron	(Germany) #113 Team Cameron					8	12	10		51.5
4	(Germany) Jim Cameron	(Germany) #113 Team Cameron					8	12	10		51.5
5	(Germany) Marcel Hoppe	(Belgium) #123 Mühlner Motorsport	9	10	9	NC	NC	NC	NC	NC	45
6	(United States) Peter Ludwig	(Belgium) #123 Mühlner Motorsport	9	10							30
7	(Netherlands) Jan Jaap van Roon	(Germany) #127 Max Kruse Racing			11	9		Ret	NC		28
7	(Portugal) Tiago Monteiro	(Germany) #127 Max Kruse Racing			11	9					28
8	(Germany) Ralf-Peter Bonk	(Germany) #106 pb-performance			12	10		Ret			24
8	(Netherlands) Marco van Ramshorst	(Germany) #106 pb-performance			12	10		Ret			24
9	(Netherlands) Paul Meijer	(Germany) #127 Max Kruse Racing				9					15
Pos.	Drivers	Team	NLS1	NLS2	24H-Q1	24H-Q2	NLS3	NLS4	NLS5	NLS6	Points

=== Porsche Endurance Trophy Nürburgring Cup3 ===
Pos.	Drivers	Team	NLS1	NLS2	24H-Q1	24H-Q2	NLS3	NLS4	NLS5	NLS6	Points
1	(Germany) Joshua Bednarski	(Germany) #962 AVIA W&S Motorsport	2	1	1	1	1	1	WD	Ret	134
1	(Germany) Lucas Daugaard	(Germany) #962 AVIA W&S Motorsport	2	1	1	1	1	1	WD	Ret	134
1	(Germany) Moritz Oberheim	(Germany) #962 AVIA W&S Motorsport	2	1	1	1	1	1	WD	Ret	134
2	(Germany) Heiko Eichenberg	(Germany) #959 SRS Team Sorg Rennsport	1	Ret	Ret	2	2	3	1	1	122.5
2	(Germany) Fabio Grosse	(Germany) #959 SRS Team Sorg Rennsport	1	Ret	Ret	2	2	3	1	1	122.5
2	(Germany) Patrik Grütter	(Germany) #959 SRS Team Sorg Rennsport	1	Ret	Ret	2	2	3	1	1	122.5
3	(Denmark) Mads Gravsen	(Germany) #949 SRS Team Sorg Rennsport	Ret	4	2	5	3	2	9	4	97.5 (106.5)
3	(United Kingdom) Harley Haughton	(Germany) #949 SRS Team Sorg Rennsport	Ret	4	2	5	3	2	9	4	97.5 (106.5)
4	(Germany) Horst Baumann	(Germany) #950 Schmickler Performance powered by Ravenol	3	2	4	3	7		2	3	92 (101)
4	(Germany) Stefan Schmickler	(Germany) #950 Schmickler Performance powered by Ravenol	3	2	4	3	7		2	3	92 (101)
5	(Austria) David Griessner	(Germany) #930 Adrenalin Motorsport Team Mainhatten Wheels	4	3	3	9	Ret	5	Ret	11	77.5
5	(Germany) Stefan Kruse	(Germany) #930 Adrenalin Motorsport Team Mainhatten Wheels	4	3	3	9	Ret	5	Ret	11	77.5
6	(Ukraine) Oleksii Kikireshko	(Germany) #969 SRS Team Sorg Rennsport	Ret	5	5	7	5	6	3	5	74 (84)
6	(Germany) Rüdiger Schicht	(Germany) #969 SRS Team Sorg Rennsport	Ret	5	5	7	5	6	3	5	74 (84)
7	(Germany) Alex Fielenbach	(Germany) #969 SRS Team Sorg Rennsport	Ret	5	5	7	5	6		5	69
8	(Italy) Edoardo Bugane	(Germany) #949 SRS Team Sorg Rennsport	Ret	4	2	5	3				59
9	(Germany) Roland Froese	(Germany) #930 Adrenalin Motorsport Team Mainhatten Wheels	4	3	3	9					52
10	(Germany) Leonard Oehme	(Germany) #944 Team Oehme					6	4	5	8	51.5
10	(Germany) Moritz Oehme	(Germany) #944 Team Oehme					6	4	5	8	51.5
11	(Germany) Markus Nölken	(Germany) / (Thailand) #945 mcchip-dkr / Renazzo Motorsport Team	5	6	7		8		6		49
12	(Germany) Markus Schmickler	(Germany) #950 Schmickler Performance powered by Ravenol		2	4	3					45
13	(Germany) Constantin Berz	(Germany) #970 Schmickler Performance powered by Ravenol	7	DNS	6	8	Ret		7		39
13	(Germany) Marcus Berz	(Germany) #970 Schmickler Performance powered by Ravenol	7	DNS	6	8	Ret		7		39
14	(Germany) Alex Koch	(Germany) #953 Smyrlis Racing	Ret	9	NC	6	Ret		10	6	38
14	(Germany) Niklas Koch	(Germany) #953 Smyrlis Racing	Ret	9	NC	6	Ret		10	6	38
15	(Germany) Christopher Rink	(Germany) #952 Smyrlis Racing	DNS	Ret	Ret		4		Ret	2	30
16	(Germany) Philipp Eis	(Germany) #945 mcchip-dkr	5	6	7						30
17	(Germany) Björn Simon	(Germany) #949 SRS Team Sorg Rennsport						2			25.5
18	(Switzerland) Ranko Mijatovic	(Germany) #930 Adrenalin Motorsport Team Mainhatten Wheels						5	Ret	11	24.5
19	(Lithuania) Kasparas Vingilis	(Germany) #949 SRS Team Sorg Rennsport							9	4	22
20	(Germany) Anton Ruf	(Germany) #953 Smyrlis Racing	Ret	9	NC	6	Ret				20
21	(Germany) Niklas Oehme	(Germany) #944 Team Oehme					6			8	19
22	(Germany) Phil Hill	(Germany) #952 Smyrlis Racing								2	17
23	(Germany) Matthias Beckwermert	(Germany) #930 Adrenalin Motorsport Team Mainhatten Wheels						5			16.5
24	(Germany) Philipp Stahlschmidt	(Germany) #952 Smyrlis Racing			Ret		4		Ret		12
25	(Japan) Kohei Fukuda	(Germany) #945 mcchip-dkr	5							Ret	11
25	(Germany) Nils Steinberg	(Thailand) #945 Renazzo Motorsport Team							6	Ret	11
26	(Japan) Kouichi Okumura	(Germany) #945 mcchip-dkr	5								11
27	(Germany) Otto Klohs	(Germany) #945 mcchip-dkr		6							10
28	(Germany) Yves Volte	(Thailand) #945 Renazzo Motorsport Team					8				8
29	(United Kingdom) Brett Lidsey	(Germany) #930 Adrenalin Motorsport Team Mainhatten Wheels					Ret				1
–	(Italy) Francesco Merlini	(Germany) #952 Smyrlis Racing	DNS	Ret	Ret						–
–	(Germany) Timo Mölig	(Germany) #952 Smyrlis Racing		Ret							
Pos.	Drivers	Team	NLS1	NLS2	24H-Q1	24H-Q2	NLS3	NLS4	NLS5	NLS6	Points

=== BMW M240i Cup ===
Pos.	Drivers	Team	NLS1	NLS2	24H-Q1	24H-Q2	NLS3	NLS4	NLS5	NLS6	Points
1	(United Kingdom) Toby Goodman	(Germany) #650 Adrenalin Motorsport Team Mainhatten Wheels	1^{15}	1^{15}	1^{15}	1^{15}	Ret		1^{15}	1^{15}	90
1	(Germany) Sven Markert	(Germany) #650 Adrenalin Motorsport Team Mainhatten Wheels	1^{15}	1^{15}	1^{15}	1^{15}	Ret		1^{15}	1^{15}	90
1	(Switzerland) Ranko Mijatovic	(Germany) #650 Adrenalin Motorsport Team Mainhatten Wheels	1^{15}	1^{15}	1^{15}	1^{15}			1^{15}	1^{15}	90
4	(Germany) Yannik Himmels	(Germany) #651 Adrenalin Motorsport Team Mainhatten Wheels	2^{11}	2^{11}	Ret	2^{11}	1^{8}	1^{8}	2^{11}	Ret	60
4	(United States) Nico Silva	(Germany) #651 Adrenalin Motorsport Team Mainhatten Wheels	2^{11}	2^{11}	Ret	2^{11}	1^{8}	1^{8}	2^{11}	Ret	60
6	(Germany) Klaus Faßbender	(Germany) #652 Adrenalin Motorsport Team Mainhatten Wheels	3^{8}	Ret	2^{11}	3^{8}		2^{5}	3^{8}		40
6	(Germany) Marvin Marino	(Germany) #651 Adrenalin Motorsport Team Mainhatten Wheels	2^{11}	2^{11}	Ret	2^{11}					33
8	(Germany) Christian Kraus	(Germany) #652 Adrenalin Motorsport Team Mainhatten Wheels					2^{6}	2^{5}	3^{8}	3^{8}	27
9	(Germany) Danny Brink	(Germany) #650 Adrenalin Motorsport Team Mainhatten Wheels					Ret				8
9	(Germany) Danny Brink	(Germany) #652 Adrenalin Motorsport Team Mainhatten Wheels								3^{8}	8
10	(Germany) Pierre Lemmerz	(Germany) #674 Teichmann Racing	6^{(3)}‡	7^{2}							2 (5)
Pos.	Drivers	Team	NLS1	NLS2	24H-Q1	24H-Q2	NLS3	NLS4	NLS5	NLS6	Points

‡: Result not counted for classification

=== BMW M2 CS Cup ===
Pos.	Drivers	Team	NLS1	NLS2	24H-Q1	24H-Q2	NLS3	NLS4	NLS5	NLS6	Points
1	(Switzerland) Martin Kroll	(Switzerland) #888/885 Hofor Racing by Bonk Motorsport	1^{2}		1^{2}	1^{2}	1^{3}	1^{3}			12
Pos.	Drivers	Team	NLS1	NLS2	24H-Q1	24H-Q2	NLS3	NLS4	NLS5	NLS6	Points
