= 2019 ADAC TCR Germany Touring Car Championship =

Motorsport season

The 2019 ADAC TCR Germany Touring Car Championship was the fourth season of touring car racing ran by the German-based sanctioning body ADAC to the TCR regulations. The series ran predominantly in ADAC's home nation Germany. As a support category to the ADAC GT Masters series, the championship will also took in races in the neighbouring nations of Austria, the Netherlands and the Czech Republic.

On 20 December 2018 it was announced a partnership between the series' promoter and Auto Sport Switzerland, the Swiss National Sporting Authority, which was going see all 7 rounds of the calendar as part of the 2019 TCR Swiss Trophy which was set to be in its second edition. The TCR Swiss Trophy was set be open to Swiss drivers as well as any driver with valid racing license, issued by Auto Sport Switzerland. On 23 April 2019 it was announced by Auto Sport Switzerland that the TCR Swiss Trophy would be postponed until 2020 due to lack of entries.

Harald Proczyk was the defending Drivers' champion, while HP Racing International was the defending Teams' champions. This year Max Hesse and Hyundai Team Engstler won.

== Teams and drivers ==
Yokohama was the official tire supplier, taking over from Hankook.

Team	Car	No.	Drivers	Class	Rounds
(Austria) HP Racing International	Hyundai i30 N TCR	1	(Austria) Harald Proczyk		All
(Austria) HP Racing International	Hyundai i30 N TCR	42	(Austria) Lukas Niedertscheider		1–6
(United Kingdom) Pyro Motorsport	Honda Civic Type R TCR (FK8)	6	(United Kingdom) Bradley Burns	J	1–6
(Germany) Profi-Car Team Honda ADAC Sachsen	Honda Civic Type R TCR (FK8)	7	(Germany) Mike Halder		All
(Germany) Profi-Car Team Honda ADAC Sachsen	Honda Civic Type R TCR (FK8)	88	(Germany) Dominik Fugel		All
(Germany) RacingOne	Audi RS3 LMS TCR	8	(Germany) René Kircher	J	All
(Finland) LMS Racing	Audi RS3 LMS TCR	13	(Finland) Antti Buri		All
(Germany) Hyundai Team Engstler	Hyundai i30 N TCR	19	(Germany) Max Hesse		All
(Germany) Hyundai Team Engstler	Hyundai i30 N TCR	27	(France) Théo Coicaud		All
(Switzerland) TOPCAR Sport	CUPRA León TCR	22	(Switzerland) Julien Apothéloz	J	All
(Switzerland) TOPCAR Sport	CUPRA León TCR	33	(United States) Joshua Corren Reynolds		1–3
(Germany) Steibel Motorsport	Volkswagen Golf GTI TCR	23	(Germany) Sebastian Steibel		1, 3–7
(Germany) Volkswagen Team Oettinger	Volkswagen Golf GTI TCR	29	(Malaysia) Mitchell Cheah	J	All
(Germany) Volkswagen Team Oettinger	Volkswagen Golf GTI TCR	50	(Germany) Kai Jordan		5–6
(Germany) Volkswagen Team Oettinger	Volkswagen Golf GTI TCR	99	(Netherlands) Maurits Sandberg		1–4, 7
(Germany) RaceSing	Hyundai i30 N TCR	34	(Germany) Patrick Sing		2
(Germany) IMC Motorsport	Opel Astra TCR	41	(Germany) Steve Kirsch		1–2
(Germany) Profi-Car Team Halder	Honda Civic Type R TCR (FK8)	53	(Germany) Michelle Halder	J	All
(Germany) Lubner Motorsport	Opel Astra TCR	98	(Germany) Jan Seyffert	J	1–3
(Germany) Lubner Motorsport	LADA Vesta TCR	98	(Germany) Jan Seyffert	J	4–7
Entries ineligible to score points
(Italy) Target Competition	Hyundai i30 N TCR	9	(Sweden) Andreas Bäckman		6
(Italy) Target Competition	Hyundai i30 N TCR	101	(Sweden) Jessica Bäckman		6
(Germany) Lubner Motorsport	Opel Astra TCR	20	(Germany) Philipp Regensperger		7
(Germany) Lubner Motorsport	Opel Astra TCR	61	(Switzerland) Jörg Schori		5
(Belgium) Comtoyou Racing	Audi RS3 LMS TCR	25	(Morocco) Sami Taoufik		7
(Germany) Steibel Motorsport	CUPRA León TCR	28	(Switzerland) Pascal Eberle		5–7
(Switzerland) Young Driver Challenge	CUPRA León TCR	30	(Switzerland) Karen Gaillard		5
(Switzerland) Young Driver Challenge	CUPRA León TCR	31	(Switzerland) Mario Anderegg		6
(Switzerland) Young Driver Challenge	CUPRA León TCR	32	(Switzerland) James Bischof		7
(Switzerland) TOPCAR Sport	CUPRA León TCR	48	(Germany) Sophie Hofmann		7
(Germany) Profi-Car Team Halder	Honda Civic Type R TCR (FK2)	55	(Germany) Marcel Fugel		2, 6–7
(Germany) ALL-INKL.COM Münnich Motorsport	Honda Civic Type R TCR (FK8)	77	(Germany) René Münnich		7
(Germany) Hyundai Team Engstler	Hyundai i30 N TCR	100	(Germany) Guido Naumann		1
(Germany) Hyundai Team Engstler	Hyundai i30 N TCR	101	(Sweden) Jessica Bäckman		2
(Germany) Hyundai Team Engstler	Hyundai i30 N TCR	102	(Italy) Gabriele Tarquini		3
(Germany) Hyundai Team Engstler	Hyundai i30 N TCR	103	(Germany) Lance David Arnold		4
(Germany) Hyundai Team Engstler	Hyundai i30 N TCR	104	(Belgium) Thierry Neuville		5
(Germany) Hyundai Team Engstler	Hyundai i30 N TCR	105	(Germany) Franz Simon		6

== Calendar and results ==
The 2018 schedule was announced on 23 September 2018, with three events scheduled to be held outside Germany. The championship will again run in support of the ADAC GT Masters weekends as well as ADAC GT4 Germany and ADAC Formula 4 (with the exception at Autodrom Most).

Rnd.		Circuit	Date	Pole position	Fastest lap	Winning driver	Winning team	Junior winner
1	1	(Germany) Motorsport Arena Oschersleben, Oschersleben	27 April	(Germany) Max Hesse (Note: Qualification won by Harald Proczyk, but he received a three-place grid penalty for speeding during red flag period.)	(Germany) Mike Halder	(Germany) Mike Halder	(Germany) Profi-Car Team Honda ADAC Sachsen	(United Kingdom) Bradley Burns
1	2	(Germany) Motorsport Arena Oschersleben, Oschersleben	28 April		(Austria) Harald Proczyk	(Finland) Antti Buri	(Finland) LMS Racing	(United Kingdom) Bradley Burns
2	3	(Czech Republic) Autodrom Most, Most	18 May	(Austria) Harald Proczyk	(Germany) Mike Halder	(Germany) Mike Halder	(Germany) Profi-Car Team Honda ADAC Sachsen	(Malaysia) Mitchell Cheah
2	4	(Czech Republic) Autodrom Most, Most	19 May		(United Kingdom) Bradley Burns	(Finland) Antti Buri	(Finland) LMS Racing	(United Kingdom) Bradley Burns
3	5	(Austria) Red Bull Ring, Spielberg	8 June	(Germany) Sebastian Steibel	(Finland) Antti Buri	(Austria) Harald Proczyk	(Austria) HP Racing International	(Malaysia) Mitchell Cheah
3	6	(Austria) Red Bull Ring, Spielberg	9 June		(Finland) Antti Buri	(Finland) Antti Buri	(Finland) LMS Racing	(Germany) René Kircher
4	7	(Netherlands) Circuit Park Zandvoort, Zandvoort	10 August	(Germany) Dominik Fugel	(Germany) Max Hesse	(Germany) Max Hesse	(Germany) Hyundai Team Engstler	(United Kingdom) Bradley Burns
4	8	(Netherlands) Circuit Park Zandvoort, Zandvoort	11 August		(Austria) Harald Proczyk	(Germany) Michelle Halder	(Germany) Profi-Car Team Halder	(Germany) Michelle Halder
5	9	(Germany) Nürburgring, Nürburg	17 August	(Germany) Max Hesse (Note: Actual pole position taken by guest driver Thierry Neuville from Hyundai Team Engstler.)	(Germany) Max Hesse (Note: Actual fastest lap of the race set by guest driver Thierry Neuville from Hyundai Team Engstler.)	(Germany) Max Hesse (Note: Actual race winner was guest driver Thierry Neuville from Hyundai Team Engstler.)	(Germany) Hyundai Team Engstler	(Switzerland) Julien Apothéloz
5	10	(Germany) Nürburgring, Nürburg	18 August		(Finland) Antti Buri (Note: Actual fastest lap of the race set by guest driver Pascal Eberle from Steibel Motorsport.)	(Germany) Max Hesse	(Germany) Hyundai Team Engstler	(Switzerland) Julien Apothéloz
6	11	(Germany) Hockenheimring, Hockenheim	14 September	(Austria) Harald Proczyk	(France) Theo Coicaud	(Austria) Harald Proczyk	(Austria) HP Racing International	(Malaysia) Mitchell Cheah
6	12	(Germany) Hockenheimring, Hockenheim	15 September		(Austria) Harald Proczyk	(Germany) Max Hesse	(Germany) Hyundai Team Engstler	(Germany) Michelle Halder
7	13	(Germany) Sachsenring, Hohenstein-Ernstthal	28 September	(Germany) Dominik Fugel	(Germany) Dominik Fugel	(Germany) Dominik Fugel	(Germany) Profi-Car Team Honda ADAC Sachsen	(Germany) Michelle Halder
7	14	(Germany) Sachsenring, Hohenstein-Ernstthal	29 September		(Germany) Dominik Fugel	(Germany) Max Hesse	(Germany) Hyundai Team Engstler	(Switzerland) Julien Apothéloz

=== Drivers' Championship ===
Scoring systems

Position	1st	2nd	3rd	4th	5th	6th	7th	8th	9th	10th	11th	12th	13th	14th	15th	16th	17th	18th	19th	20th	PP	FL
Points	40	36	32	29	26	23	20	18	16	14	12	10	8	7	6	5	4	3	2	1	**5**	1

Pos.	Driver	OSC (Germany)		MST (Czech Republic)		RBR (Austria)		ZAN (Netherlands)		NÜR (Germany)		HOC (Germany)		SAC (Germany)		Pts.
1	(Germany) Max Hesse	**2**^{1}	3	2^{3}	5	11	5	1	9	**2**^{1}	1	2^{3}	1	8^{5}	1	438
2	(Austria) Harald Proczyk	3^{4}	6	**3**^{1}	8	1^{3}	2	3^{3}	5	10^{4}	14	**1**^{1}	3	4^{3}	2	431
3	(Finland) Antti Buri	4	1	5	1	3	1	5^{5}	2	4	3	10	12	2^{4}	3	426
4	(Germany) Mike Halder	1^{2}	2	1^{2}	4	15	8	2^{4}	3	16^{2}	4	4^{4}	5	3^{2}	4	399
5	(Germany) Dominik Fugel	12^{3}	17	4^{5}	3	14	Ret	**4**^{1}	13	Ret	10	5	4	**1**^{1}	5	271
6	(France) Theo Coicaud	6^{5}	5	6	7	5^{5}	7	8	Ret	6^{3}	Ret	3^{2}	Ret	9	6	266
7	(Germany) Michelle Halder	17	9	9	11	8	4	12	1	12	15	13	6	5	12	249
8	(Switzerland) Julien Apothéloz	14	16	Ret^{4}	9	4^{2}	9	11	8	3	5	18	17	7	7	226.5
9	(Germany) René Kircher	10	8	11	Ret	9	3	10	11	9	13	12	7	14	14	214
10	(Austria) Lukas Niedertscheider	7	7	7	6	7	6	9	7	5^{5}	16	Ret^{5}	DNS			202
11	(Malaysia) Mitchell Cheah	Ret	10	8	Ret	2^{4}	10	Ret	Ret	8	12	11	9	Ret	9	171
12	(United Kingdom) Bradley Burns	5	4	15	2	Ret	Ret	6^{2}	6	Ret	11	WD	WD			159
13	(Germany) Sebastian Steibel	13	13			**6**^{1}	13	13	Ret	13	7	9	10	11	16	158
14	(Germany) Jan Seyffert	8	15	DNS	Ret	13	11	15	12	14	8	15	15	Ret	17	115.5
15	(Netherlands) Maurits Sandberg	15	Ret	10	14	10	15	14	10					12	15	102
16	(Germany) Steve Kirsch	9	12	12	10											52
17	(Germany) Kai Jordan									10	17	14	14			47.5
18	(United States) J. C. Reynolds	16	14	13	WD	12	12									42
19	(Germany) Patrick Sing			14	Ret											7
Drivers ineligible to score points
	(Belgium) Thierry Neuville									**1**	6					
	(Switzerland) Pascal Eberle									7	2	6	Ret	6	8	
	(Sweden) Jessica Bäckman			Ret	13							7	2			
	(Germany) Lance David Arnold							7	4							
	(Germany) Marcel Fugel			Ret	12							Ret	8	13	10	
	(Sweden) Andreas Bäckman											8	11			
	(Switzerland) Karen Gaillard									17	9					
	(Morocco) Sami Taoufik													10	11	
	(Germany) Guido Naumann	11	11													
	(Germany) Franz Simon											16	13			
	(Germany) René Münnich													18†	13	
	(Italy) Gabriele Tarquini					Ret	14									
	(Switzerland) Jörg Schori									15	18					
	(Switzerland) James Bischof													15	18	
	(Switzerland) Mario Anderegg											17	16			
	(Germany) Philipp Regensperger													16	Ret	
	(Germany) Sophie Hofmann													17	19	
Pos.	Driver	OSC (Germany)		MST (Czech Republic)		RBR (Austria)		ZAN (Netherlands)		NÜR (Germany)		HOC (Germany)		SAC (Germany)		Pts.

Colour	Result
Gold	Winner
Silver	Second place
Bronze	Third place
Green	Points classification
Blue	Non-points classification
Blue	Non-classified finish (NC)
Purple	Retired, not classified (Ret)
Red	Did not qualify (DNQ)
Red	Did not pre-qualify (DNPQ)
Black	Disqualified (DSQ)
White	Did not start (DNS)
White	Withdrew (WD)
White	Race cancelled (C)
Blank	Did not practice (DNP)
Blank	Did not arrive (DNA)
Blank	Excluded (EX)

**Bold** – Pole
Italics – Fastest Lap

=== Teams' Championship ===
Pos.	Driver	OSC (Germany)		MST (Czech Republic)		RBR (Austria)		ZAN (Netherlands)		NÜR (Germany)		HOC (Germany)		SAC (Germany)		Pts.
1	(Germany) Hyundai Team Engstler	2	3	2	5	5	5	1	9	2	1	2	1	8	1	680
1	(Germany) Hyundai Team Engstler	6	5	6	7	11	7	8	Ret	6	Ret	3	Ret	9	6	680
2	(Germany) Profi-Car Team Honda ADAC Sachsen	1	2	1	3	14	8	2	3	16	4	4	4	1	4	640
2	(Germany) Profi-Car Team Honda ADAC Sachsen	12	17	4	4	15	Ret	4	13	Ret	10	5	5	3	5	640
3	(Austria) HP Racing International	3	6	3	6	1	2	3	5	5	14	1	3	4	2	608
3	(Austria) HP Racing International	7	7	7	8	7	6	9	7	10	16	Ret	DNS			608
4	(Finland) LMS Racing	4	1	5	1	3	1	5	2	4	3	10	12	2	3	421
5	(Germany) Volkswagen Team Oettinger	15	10	8	14	2	10	14	10	8	12	11	9	12	9	314,5
5	(Germany) Volkswagen Team Oettinger	Ret	Ret	10	Ret	10	15	Ret	Ret	10	17	14	14	Ret	15	314,5
6	(Germany) Profi-Car Team Halder	17	9	9	11	8	4	12	1	12	15	13	6	5	12	269
7	(Switzerland) TOPCAR Sport	14	14	13	9	4	9	11	8	3	5	18	17	7	7	260,5
7	(Switzerland) TOPCAR Sport	16	16	Ret	DNS	12	12									260,5
8	(Germany) RacingOne	10	8	11	Ret	9	3	10	11	9	13	12	7	14	14	214
9	(United Kingdom) Team Pyro Motorsport	5	4	15	2	Ret	Ret	6	6	Ret	11	DNS	DNS			155
10	(Germany) Steibel Motorsport	13	13			6	13	13	Ret	13	7	9	10	11	16	152
11	(Germany) Lubner Motorsport	8	15	DNS	Ret	13	11	15	12	14	8	15	15	Ret	17	113,5
12	(Germany) IMC Motorsport	9	12	12	10											52
13	(Germany) ALL-INKL.COM Münnich Motorsport													18†	13	10
14	(Germany) RaceSing			14	Ret											7
Teams ineligible to score points
	(Germany) Hyundai Team Engstler	11	11	Ret	13	Ret	14	7	4	1	6	16	13			
	(Germany) Steibel Motorsport									7	2	6	Ret	6	8	
	(Italy) Target Competition											7	2			
	(Italy) Target Competition											8	11			
	(Germany) Profi-Car Team Halder			Ret	12							Ret	8	13	10	
	(Switzerland) Young Driver Challenge									17	9			15	18	
	(Belgium) Comtoyou Racing													10	11	
	(Germany) Lubner Motorsport									15	18			16	Ret	
	(Switzerland) TOPCAR Sport											17	16	17	19	
Pos.	Driver	OSC (Germany)		MST (Czech Republic)		RBR (Austria)		ZAN (Netherlands)		NÜR (Germany)		HOC (Germany)		SAC (Germany)		Pts.

Colour	Result
Gold	Winner
Silver	Second place
Bronze	Third place
Green	Points classification
Blue	Non-points classification
Blue	Non-classified finish (NC)
Purple	Retired, not classified (Ret)
Red	Did not qualify (DNQ)
Red	Did not pre-qualify (DNPQ)
Black	Disqualified (DSQ)
White	Did not start (DNS)
White	Withdrew (WD)
White	Race cancelled (C)
Blank	Did not practice (DNP)
Blank	Did not arrive (DNA)
Blank	Excluded (EX)

**Bold** – Pole
Italics – Fastest Lap
