= 2023 TCR Denmark Touring Car Series =

Car racing competition

The 2023 TCR Denmark Touring Car Series was the fourth season of the TCR Denmark Touring Car Series.

The season began at Jyllandsringen in May and concluded at the same circuit in October.

Kasper Jensen won his fourth TCR Denmark drivers title, while his team GMB Motorsport won the teams championship for a second time. Honda won their second constructors title, René Povlsen secured his second Trophy title and Gustav Birch won his first U25 title.

== Teams and drivers ==
Team	Car	No.	Drivers	Class	Rounds	Ref.
(Denmark) Sally Racing	CUPRA León TCR	3	(Denmark) Niels Nyboe	T	1–3	
(Denmark) Insight Racing	Alfa Romeo Giulietta Veloce TCR	5	(Denmark) Johnny Vejlebo	T	1–4	
(Denmark) Insight Racing	Hyundai i30 N TCR	444	(Denmark) Silas Rytter	U	All	
(Denmark) GMB Motorsport	Honda Civic Type R TCR (FK8)	6	(Denmark) Kasper Jensen		All	
(Denmark) GMB Motorsport	Honda Civic Type R TCR (FK8)	44	(Denmark) Gustav Birch	U	All	
(Denmark) Meteor Racing	Audi RS 3 LMS TCR (2021)	8	(Denmark) Allan Kristensen	T	All	
(Denmark) Meteor Racing	Audi RS 3 LMS TCR (2021)	41	(Denmark) René Povlsen	T	All	
(Denmark) Green Development	CUPRA León Competición TCR	11	(Denmark) Nicolai Sylvest		All	
(Denmark) Green Development	CUPRA León Competición TCR	33	(Denmark) Lars Højris	T	All	
(Denmark) Markussen Racing	CUPRA León Competición TCR	18	(Denmark) Michael Markussen		All	
(Denmark) Outzen Motorsport	Hyundai i30 N TCR	19	(Denmark) Martin Andersen		5–6	
(Denmark) Team Low Budget	Peugeot 308 TCR	20	(Denmark) Steffen Larsen	T	5	
(Sweden) TPR Motorsport (Note: Cars No. 21 and No. 77 scored team points as "TPR Motorsport Audi". Cars No. 37 and No. 53 scored team points as "TPR Motorsport Honda".)	Audi RS 3 LMS TCR (2021)	21	(Sweden) Anton Bergström	U	All	
(Sweden) TPR Motorsport	Audi RS 3 LMS TCR (2021)	77	(Germany) Mike Halder		All	
(Sweden) TPR Motorsport	Honda Civic Type R TCR (FK8)	37	(Denmark) Kevin Brandsborg	U	All	
(Sweden) TPR Motorsport	Honda Civic Type R TCR (FK8)	53	(Germany) Michelle Halder		All	
(Denmark) PL Racing	Honda Civic Type R TCR (FL5)	22	(Denmark) Philip Lindberg	U	All	
(Sweden) Team Auto Lounge Racing (Note: Cars No. 23 and No. 24 scored team points as "Auto Lounge 1". Cars No. 25 and No. 60 scored team points as "Auto Lounge 2".)	CUPRA León Competición TCR	23	(Denmark) Jan Magnussen		All	
(Sweden) Team Auto Lounge Racing	Audi RS 3 LMS TCR (2021)	24	(Sweden) Kevin Engman		All	
(Sweden) Team Auto Lounge Racing	Audi RS 3 LMS TCR (2021)	25	(Sweden) Christian Skaar	T	All	
(Sweden) Team Auto Lounge Racing	Audi RS 3 LMS TCR (2021)	60	(Norway) Marius Solberg Hansen	U	1–4	
(Denmark) Team Bundgas	Honda Civic Type R TCR (FK8)	169	(Denmark) Kim König	T	All	
(Norway) Esbjug Motorsport	Honda Civic Type R TCR (FK8)	230	(Norway) Didrik Esbjug	U	1, 3, 5, 7	

Icon	Class
T	Trophy
U	U25/Drivers below 25

== Calendar and results ==
The 2023 calendar was announced on November 18, 2022, with six rounds held in Denmark and one in Sweden.

Rnd.		Circuit	Date	Pole position	Fastest lap	Winning driver	Winning team	Trophy winner	U25 winner
1	R1	Jyllandsringen	21 May	(Denmark) Kasper Jensen	(Denmark) Kasper Jensen	(Denmark) Kasper Jensen	(Denmark) GMB Motorsport	(Denmark) Lars Højris	(Denmark) Gustav Birch
1	R2	Jyllandsringen	21 May		(Sweden) Kevin Engman	(Sweden) Kevin Engman	(Sweden) Team Auto Lounge Racing	(Denmark) Lars Højris	(Denmark) Kevin Brandsborg
1	R3	Jyllandsringen	21 May		(Denmark) Jan Magnussen	(Denmark) Jan Magnussen	(Sweden) Team Auto Lounge Racing	(Denmark) Allan Kristensen	(Denmark) Gustav Birch
2	R4	Ring Djursland	18 June	(Denmark) Nicolai Sylvest	(Denmark) Nicolai Sylvest	(Denmark) Nicolai Sylvest	(Denmark) Green Development	(Denmark) René Povlsen	(Denmark) Gustav Birch
2	R5	Ring Djursland	18 June		(Denmark) Silas Rytter	(Denmark) Silas Rytter	(Denmark) Insight Racing	(Sweden) Christian Skaar	(Denmark) Silas Rytter
2	R6	Ring Djursland	18 June		(Denmark) Jan Magnussen	(Denmark) Silas Rytter	(Denmark) Insight Racing	(Denmark) René Povlsen	(Denmark) Silas Rytter
3	R7	Falkenbergs Motorbana	9 July	(Denmark) Kasper Jensen	(Denmark) Kasper Jensen	(Denmark) Kasper Jensen	(Denmark) GMB Motorsport	(Denmark) René Povlsen	(Norway) Marius Solberg Hansen
3	R8	Falkenbergs Motorbana	9 July		(Denmark) Michael Markussen	(Germany) Mike Halder	(Sweden) TPR Motorsport	(Denmark) René Povlsen	(Norway) Marius Solberg Hansen
3	R9	Falkenbergs Motorbana	9 July		(Denmark) Jan Magnussen	(Denmark) Jan Magnussen	(Sweden) Team Auto Lounge Racing	(Denmark) René Povlsen	(Norway) Marius Solberg Hansen
4	R10	Copenhagen	5 August	(Denmark) Kasper Jensen	(Denmark) Kasper Jensen	(Denmark) Kasper Jensen	(Denmark) GMB Motorsport	(Denmark) Lars Højris	(Denmark) Kevin Brandsborg
4	R11	Copenhagen	6 August		(Denmark) Nicolai Sylvest	(Denmark) Nicolai Sylvest	(Denmark) Green Development	(Denmark) Lars Højris	(Denmark) Silas Rytter
4	R12	Copenhagen	6 August		(Denmark) Nicolai Sylvest	(Denmark) Michael Markussen	(Denmark) Markussen Racing	(Denmark) René Povlsen	(Denmark) Silas Rytter
5	R13	Jyllandsringen	20 August	(Denmark) Kasper Jensen	(Denmark) Kasper Jensen	(Denmark) Kasper Jensen	(Denmark) GMB Motorsport	(Denmark) René Povlsen	(Denmark) Silas Rytter
5	R14	Jyllandsringen	20 August		(Denmark) Kasper Jensen	(Germany) Mike Halder	(Sweden) TPR Motorsport	(Denmark) Lars Højris	(Denmark) Gustav Birch
5	R15	Jyllandsringen	20 August		(Denmark) Jan Magnussen	(Denmark) Kasper Jensen	(Denmark) GMB Motorsport	(Denmark) Lars Højris	(Denmark) Silas Rytter
6	R16	Padborg Park	16 September	(Denmark) Kasper Jensen	(Denmark) Kasper Jensen	(Denmark) Kasper Jensen	(Denmark) GMB Motorsport	(Denmark) René Povlsen	(Denmark) Gustav Birch
6	R17	Padborg Park	16 September		(Germany) Mike Halder	(Germany) Mike Halder	(Sweden) TPR Motorsport	(Sweden) Christian Skaar	(Denmark) Kevin Brandsborg
6	R18	Padborg Park	16 September		(Denmark) Kasper Jensen	(Denmark) Kasper Jensen	(Denmark) GMB Motorsport	(Denmark) René Povlsen	(Denmark) Gustav Birch
7	R19	Jyllandsringen	1 October	(Denmark) Kasper Jensen	(Denmark) Kasper Jensen	(Denmark) Kasper Jensen	(Denmark) GMB Motorsport	(Sweden) Christian Skaar	(Denmark) Gustav Birch
7	R20	Jyllandsringen	1 October		(Germany) Mike Halder	(Denmark) Philip Lindberg	(Denmark) PL Racing	(Denmark) Allan Kristensen	(Denmark) Kevin Brandsborg
7	R21	Jyllandsringen	1 October		(Germany) Mike Halder	(Germany) Mike Halder	(Sweden) TPR Motorsport	(Denmark) Allan Kristensen	(Denmark) Gustav Birch

== Championship Standings ==
Scoring system

Position	**1st**	**2nd**	**3rd**	**4th**	**5th**	**6th**	**7th**	**8th**	**9th**	**10th**	**11th**	**12th**	**13th**	**14th**	**15th**	Fastest lap
Race	25	21	18	16	14	12	10	8	7	6	5	4	3	2	1	2

=== Drivers' Championship ===
Pos.	Driver	JYL1			DJU			FAL			COP			JYL2			PDB			JYL3			Pts.
Pos.	Driver	RD1	RD2	RD3	RD1	RD2	RD3	RD1	RD2	RD3	RD1	RD2	RD3	RD1	RD2	RD3	RD1	RD2	RD3	RD1	RD2	RD3	Pts.
1	(Denmark) Kasper Jensen	**1**	Ret	7	2	6	2	**1**	8	16	**1**	Ret	3	**1**	4	1	**1**	6	1	**1**	9	2	362
2	(Germany) Mike Halder	5	4	4	5	4	5	8	1	3	3	6	4	9	1	4	10	1	2	4	2	1	334
3	(Denmark) Nicolai Sylvest	4	13	DNS	**1**	7	3	3	4	2	6	1	2	3	6	8	2	Ret	5	3	4	3	313
4	(Denmark) Jan Magnussen	3	6	1	DSQ	8	4	2	3	1	2	Ret	5	2	5	2	5	7	Ret	2	Ret	6	291
5	(Sweden) Kevin Engman	8	1	2	3	10	7	7	2	4	8	11	8	DNS	15	6	7	4	4	6	5	4	249
6	(Denmark) Michael Markussen	7	3	5	8	2	6	5	5	5	4	2	1	5	8	7	3	Ret	DNS	Ret	14	10	239
7	(Denmark) Gustav Birch	2	7	3	4	9	8	6	7	12	7	5	7	8	2	9	4	9	6	5	6	5	233
8	(Denmark) Silas Rytter	11	11	8	6	1	1	12	11	7	10	3	6	7	7	5	12	8	14	9	8	8	198
9	(Denmark) Philip Lindberg	Ret	16	12	7	11	9	10	Ret	17	Ret	DNS	DNS	6	3	3	8	3	9	10	1	7	154
10	(Denmark) Kevin Brandsborg	9	2	6	11	13	10	9	NC	Ret	5	Ret	DNS	12	9	10	6	5	Ret	8	3	9	151
11	(Germany) Michelle Halder	6	5	11	9	5	11	11	9	9	Ret	DNS	DNS	10	Ret	16	14	11	Ret	7	7	Ret	109
12	(Norway) Marius Solberg Hansen	18	10	10	10	3	DSQ	4	6	6	Ret	7	Ret										86
13	(Denmark) René Povlsen	Ret	15	14	12	19	12	14	12	10	12	10	9	13	13	14	11	12	7	15	13	14	72
14	(Denmark) Lars Højris	10	9	Ret	14	18	14	18	16	15	9	4	Ret	14	11	11	16	16	10	14	Ret	13	64
15	(Denmark) Martin Andersen													4	DSQ	DNS	9	2	3				62
16	(Sweden) Anton Bergström	13	Ret	DNS	13	12	Ret	13	10	8	11	8	DNS	DNS	17	17	17	13	8	17	11	11	61
17	(Denmark) Allan Kristensen	17	14	13	18	DNS	DNS	15	13	11	13	12	10	15	12	12	13	14	11	13	12	12	57
18	(Norway) Didrik Esbjug	12	8	9				Ret	14	Ret				11	10	Ret				11	10	15	44
19	(Sweden) Christian Skaar	19	12	DSQ	Ret	14	13	DSQ	19	13	14	9	Ret	DSQ	DSQ	DSQ	Ret	10	12	12	15	Ret	36
20	(Denmark) Kim König	14	17	Ret	15	15	Ret	16	17	14	15	13	11	16	16	15	15	15	13	16	16	16	21
21	(Denmark) Steffen Larsen													17	14	13							5
22	(Denmark) Johnny Vejlebo	15	18	15	16	16	16	17	15	Ret	DNS	DNS	DNS										3
23	(Denmark) Niels Nyboe	16	Ret	DNS	17	17	15	19	18	Ret													1
Pos.	Driver	JYL1			DJU			FAL			COP			JYL2			PDB			JYL3			Pts.

Colour	Result
Gold	Winner
Silver	Second place
Bronze	Third place
Green	Points classification
Blue	Non-points classification
Blue	Non-classified finish (NC)
Purple	Retired, not classified (Ret)
Red	Did not qualify (DNQ)
Red	Did not pre-qualify (DNPQ)
Black	Disqualified (DSQ)
White	Did not start (DNS)
White	Withdrew (WD)
White	Race cancelled (C)
Blank	Did not practice (DNP)
Blank	Did not arrive (DNA)
Blank	Excluded (EX)

**Bold** – Pole
Italics – Fastest Lap

=== Teams' Championship ===
Pos.	Team	Points
1	(Denmark) GMB Motorsport	613
2	(Sweden) Auto Lounge 1	554
3	(Sweden) TPR Motorsport Audi	416
4	(Denmark) Green Development	380
5	(Sweden) TPR Motorsport Honda	261
6	(Denmark) Markussen Racing	247
7	(Denmark) Insight Racing	211
8	(Denmark) PL Racing	154
9	(Denmark) Meteor Racing	130
10	(Sweden) Auto Lounge 2	122
11	(Denmark) Outzen Motorsport	62
12	(Norway) Esbjug Motorsport	44
13	(Denmark) Team Bundgas	21
14	(Denmark) Team Low Budget	5
15	(Denmark) Sally Racing	1

=== Constructors' Championship ===
Pos.	Manufacturer	Points
1	Honda	94
2	Cupra	85
3	Audi	79
4	Hyundai	57
5	Alfa Romeo	8

=== Trophy Championship ===
Pos.	Driver	JYL1			DJU			FAL			COP			JYL2			PDB			JYL3			Pts.
Pos.	Driver	RD1	RD2	RD3	RD1	RD2	RD3	RD1	RD2	RD3	RD1	RD2	RD3	RD1	RD2	RD3	RD1	RD2	RD3	RD1	RD2	RD3	Pts.
1	(Denmark) René Povlsen	Ret	15	14	12	19	12	14	12	10	12	10	9	13	13	14	11	12	7	15	13	14	193
2	(Denmark) Allan Kristensen	17	14	13	18	DNS	DNS	15	13	11	13	12	10	15	12	12	13	14	11	13	12	12	169
3	(Denmark) Lars Højris	10	9	Ret	14	18	14	18	16	15	9	4	Ret	14	11	11	16	16	10	14	Ret	13	158
4	(Denmark) Kim König	14	17	Ret	15	15	Ret	16	17	14	15	13	11	16	16	15	15	15	13	16	16	16	110
5	(Sweden) Christian Skaar	19	12	DSQ	Ret	14	13	DSQ	19	13	14	9	Ret	DSQ	DSQ	DSQ	Ret	10	12	12	15	Ret	105
6	(Denmark) Johnny Vejlebo	15	18	15	16	16	16	17	15	Ret	DNS	DNS	DNS										51
7	(Denmark) Niels Nyboe	16	Ret	DNS	17	17	15	19	18	Ret													28
8	(Denmark) Steffen Larsen													17	14	13							18
Pos.	Driver	JYL1			DJU			FAL			COP			JYL2			PDB			JYL3			Pts.

=== U25 Championship ===
Pos.	Driver	JYL1			DJU			FAL			COP			JYL2			PDB			JYL3			Pts.
Pos.	Driver	RD1	RD2	RD3	RD1	RD2	RD3	RD1	RD2	RD3	RD1	RD2	RD3	RD1	RD2	RD3	RD1	RD2	RD3	RD1	RD2	RD3	Pts.
1	(Denmark) Gustav Birch	2	7	3	4	9	8	6	7	12	7	5	7	8	2	9	4	9	6	5	6	5	202
2	(Denmark) Silas Rytter	11	11	8	6	1	1	12	11	7	10	3	6	7	7	5	12	8	14	9	8	8	178
3	(Denmark) Kevin Brandsborg	9	2	6	11	13	10	9	NC	Ret	5	Ret	DNS	12	9	10	6	5	Ret	8	3	9	139
4	(Germany) Michelle Halder	6	5	11	9	5	11	11	9	9	Ret	DNS	DNS	10	Ret	16	14	11	Ret	7	7	Ret	109
5	(Sweden) Anton Bergström	13	Ret	DNS	13	12	Ret	13	10	8	11	8	DNS	DNS	17	17	17	13	8	17	11	11	77
6	(Norway) Marius Solberg Hansen	18	10	10	10	3	DSQ	4	6	6	Ret	7	Ret										73
7	(Norway) Didrik Esbjug	12	8	9				Ret	14	Ret				11	10	Ret				11	10	15	43
Pos.	Driver	JYL1			DJU			FAL			COP			JYL2			PDB			JYL3			Pts.
