= Michelle Halder =

German racing driver (born 1999)

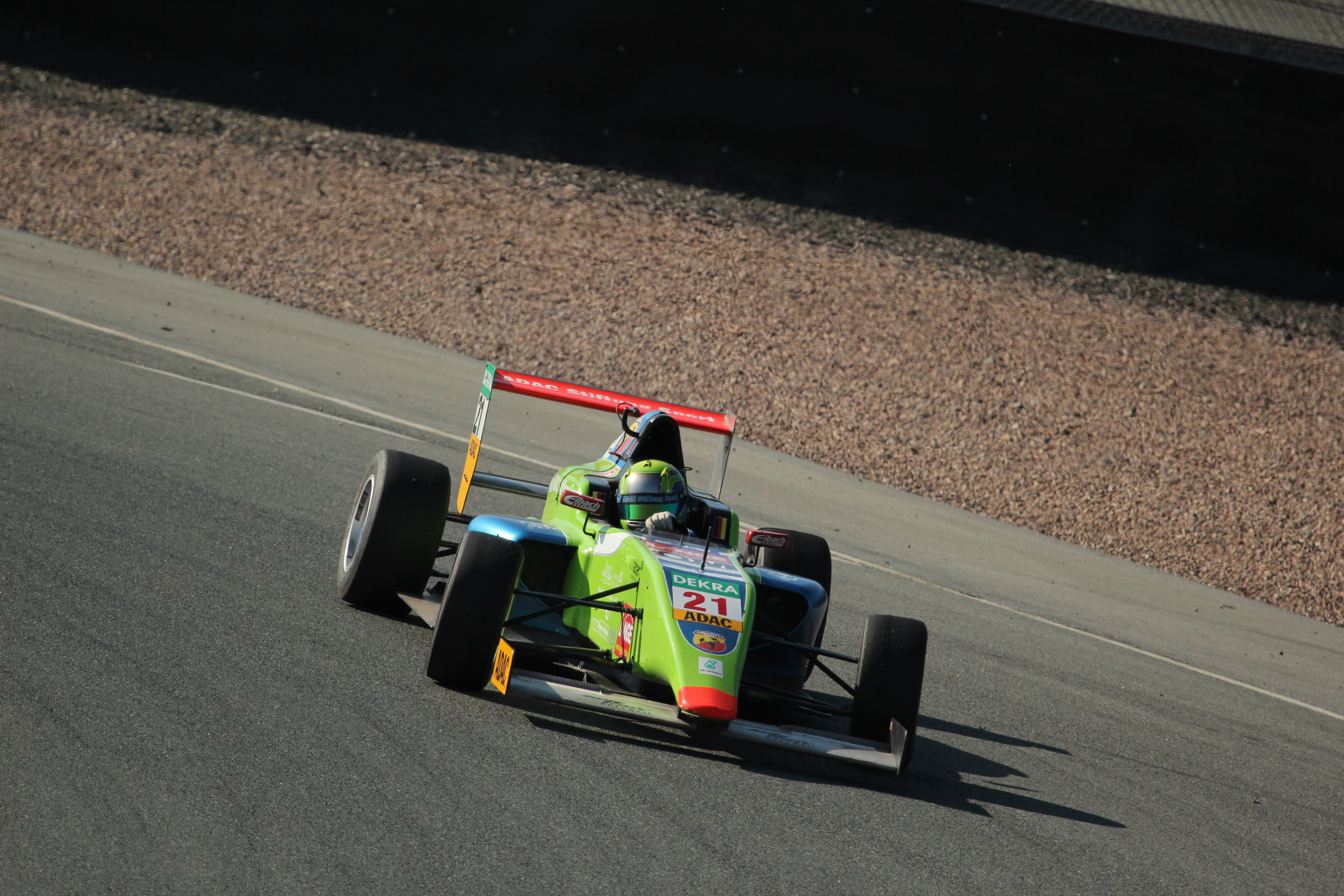
- Halder at the Sachsenring in 2015
- Born: Michelle Halder; 25 July 1999 (age 27); Überlingen am Bodensee, Germany
- Nationality: (Germany) German
- Relatives: Mike Halder (brother)
- Categorisation: FIA Silver

Michelle Halder (born 25 July 1999) is a German racing driver who last competed in the AT2 class of the Nürburgring Langstrecken-Serie for Giti Tire Motorsport by WS Racing.

== Personal life ==
Halder is the sister of fellow racing driver Mike Halder.

== Career ==
Halder began karting in 2007, competing until 2014. In her karting career, she most notably won the 2011 Kart Trophy Weiss Blau in the Mini class and the 2013 ADAC Kart Bundesendlauf title in the KF3 class ahead of her step-up to single-seaters.

In 2015, Halder made her single-seater debut in the ADAC Formula 4 Championship for Engstler Motorsport. In her first season in cars, she scored a best result of 20th twice on her way to 47th in points. Despite returning to the series and team for 2016, Halder only scored a best result of 23rd at the Red Bull Ring before leaving single-seaters at the end of the year.

Following a season in the Spezial-Tourenwagen-Trophy (STT), in which she scored one overall podium, Halder joined the ADAC TCR Germany Touring Car Championship with her family-owned team Halder Motorsport. In the second round of the season at Most, Halder scored her maiden series podium by finishing second in race two but collected maximum points as race winner Petr Fulín was a guest driver. Halder then scored her second and final podium of the season in race two at Sachsenring by finishing second and taking the fastest lap, which helped her end the year ninth in points.

Halder and her team returned to the series for 2019. In her sophomore season in the series, Halder took her only overall win in the series in race two at Circuit Zandvoort, en route to a seventh-place points finish. The following year, Halder returned to the series with her family-owned team, but left the series despite collecting maximum points at the Nürburgring. Switching to TCR Europe for the rest of the season, Halder became the first woman to take an overall win in the series at Zolder as she ended the year 15th in points.

The following year, Halder competed in both the SP8T class of the Nürburgring Langstrecken-Serie and the TCR Spain Touring Car Championship. In the former, Halder finished fourth in the class standings, whereas in TCR Spain, she ended the year third overall after scoring two wins. Halder then returned to TCR Europe for 2022, taking just five points finishes all season with a best result of 13th at the Norisring on her way to 21st in points.

Having made her debut in TCR Denmark at the end of 2022, Halder returned to the series for the following year, albeit on a full-time basis as she joined TPR Motorsport. In her only full-time season in the series, Halder scored a best result of fifth at Ring Djursland as she ended the year 11th in points.

Halder returned to Nürburgring-based races for 2024, also making her debut in the 24 Hours of Nürburgring, winning in the AT 2 class on her debut and also taking a class win in the Nürburgring Langstrecken-Serie that same year. The following year, Halder remained in the NLS and once again returned to the 24 Hours of Nürburgring, finishing third in the AT 2 class.

== Karting record ==
=== Karting career summary ===
Season	Series	Team	Position
2011	Rotax Max Challenge Germany – Mini		12th
2012	Rotax Max Challenge Germany – Junior World		14th
2012	DMV Kart Championship – KF3		7th
2012	IAME International Final – X30 Junior		11th
2013	ADAC Kart Bundesendlauf – KF3		1st
2013	ADAC Kart Masters – KF3		17th
2013	X30 Challenge Europe – X30 Junior	Wild Kart Racing Team	15th
2013	IAME International Final – X30 Junior	Wild Kart Racing Team	32nd
2014	ADAC Kart Bundesendlauf – X30 Junior		4th
2014	ADAC Kart Masters – X30 Junior		3rd
2014	IAME International Final – X30 Junior		5th

== Racing record ==
=== Racing career summary ===
Season	Series	Team	Races	Wins	Poles	F/Laps	Podiums	Points	Position
2015	ADAC Formula 4 Championship	Engstler Motorsport	21	0	0	0	0	0	47th
2016	ADAC Formula 4 Championship	Liqui Moly Team Engstler	15	0	0	0	0	0	46th
2018	ADAC TCR Germany Touring Car Championship	Profi-Car Team Halder	14	1	0	1	2	208.5	9th
2018	TCR Swiss Trophy	Profi-Car Team Halder	2	0	0	0	0	0	NC
2018	Audi Sport Seyffarth R8 LMS Cup		4	0	0	0	0	28	14th
2019	ADAC TCR Germany Touring Car Championship	Profi-Car Team Halder	14	1	0	1	1	249	7th
2019	VLN Series – SP3	Profi-Car Team Halder	1	0	0	0	0	0	NC
2019	VLN Series – V4	Lubner Motorsport	2	0	0	0	0	8.69	69th
2019	VLN Series – V4		1	0	0	0	0	8.69	69th
2019	VLN Series – V4	Scuderia Solagon	1	0	0	0	0	8.69	69th
2020	ADAC TCR Germany Touring Car Championship	Profi-Car Team Halder	3	1	0	0	1	43	11th
2020	TCR Europe Touring Car Series	Profi-Car Team Halder	12	1	0	0	1	115	15th
2020	Nürburgring Langstrecken-Serie – SP3T	Profi-Car Team Halder	2	0	0	0	0	0	NC
2020	TCR Iberico	Profi-Car Team Halder						6	19th
2021	TCR Spain	Profi Car Team Halder	13	2	2	0	7	371	**3rd**
2021	Nürburgring Langstrecken-Serie – SP3T	Profi Car Team Halder	8	0	0	0	6	29.4	4th
2021	TCR Ibérico Sprint	Profi Car Team Halder						78	4th
2022	TCR Europe Touring Car Series	Profi-Car Team Halder	13	0	0	0	0	19	21st
2022	TCR Denmark Touring Car Series	TPR Motorsport	3	0	0	0	0	5	21st
2023	TCR Denmark Touring Car Series	TPR Motorsport	19	0	0	0	0	109	11th
2023	Nürburgring Langstrecken-Serie – TCR	Halder Motorsport	5	1	0	0	1	0	NC
2024	Porsche Endurance Trophy Nürburgring – CUP2	Halder Motorsport	2	0	0	0	0	18	25th
2024	Nürburgring Langstrecken-Serie – AT(-G)	Four Motors Bioconcept-Car	2	1	0	0	2	0	NC
2024	24 Hours of Nürburgring – AT 2	Four Motors Bioconcept-Car	1	1	1	1	1	—N/a	**1st**
2025	Nürburgring Langstrecken-Serie – AT 2	Four Motors Bioconcept-Car	1	0	0	0	1	0	NC
2025	24 Hours of Nürburgring – AT 2	Four Motors Bioconcept-Car	1	0	0	0	1	—N/a	**3rd**
2026	Nürburgring Langstrecken-Serie – AT 2	Giti Tire Motorsport by WS Racing	1	0	0	0	1	2	NC
2026	24 Hours of Nürburgring – AT 2	Giti Tire Motorsport by WS Racing	0	0	0	0	0	—N/a	WD
2026	Nürburgring Langstrecken-Serie – SP10	Giti Tire Motorsport by WS Racing	1	0	0	0	0	0	NC

=== Complete ADAC Formula 4 Championship results ===
(key) (Races in bold indicate pole position) (Races in italics indicate fastest lap)

Year	Team	1	2	3	4	5	6	7	8	9	10	11	12	13	14	15	16	17	18	19	20	21	22	23	24	DC	Points
2015	Engstler Motorsport	OSC; 1 DNQ	OSC; 2 DNQ	OSC; 3 DNQ	RBR; 1; 30	RBR; 2; 29	RBR; 3; 27	SPA; 1; 31	SPA; 2; 32	SPA; 3; 31	LAU; 1; 22	LAU; 2 Ret	LAU; 3; 24	NÜR; 1; 31	NÜR; 2; 24	NÜR; 3; 30	SAC; 1; 20	SAC; 2; 25	SAC; 3; 24	OSC; 1; 27	OSC; 2; 22	OSC; 3; 27	HOC; 1 Ret	HOC; 2; 22	HOC; 3; 20	47th	0
2016	Liqui Moly Team Engstler	OSC1; 1; 25	OSC1; 2; 27	OSC1; 3; 24	SAC; 1 DNQ	SAC; 2 DNQ	SAC; 3 DNQ	LAU; 1	LAU; 2	LAU; 3	OSC2; 1	OSC2; 2	OSC2; 3	RBR; 1; 29	RBR; 2; 28	RBR; 3; 23	NÜR; 1; 28	NÜR; 2; 27	NÜR; 3; 26	ZAN; 1; 27	ZAN; 2; 26	ZAN; 3; 31	HOC; 1; 25	HOC; 2; 25	HOC; 3; 26	46th	0

=== Complete ADAC TCR Germany Touring Car Championship results ===
(key) (Races in bold indicate pole position) (Races in italics indicate fastest lap)

Year	Team	Car	1	2	3	4	5	6	7	8	9	10	11	12	13	14	DC	Points
2018	Profi-Car Team Halder	CUPRA León TCR	OSC; 1; 13	OSC; 2; 15	MST; 1; 18	MST; 2; 2	RBR; 1; 15	RBR; 2; 13	NÜR; 1; 5^{5}	NÜR; 2; 10	ZAN; 1 Ret	ZAN; 2; 12	SAC; 1; 5	SAC; 2; 2	HOC; 1; 15	HOC; 2; 10	9th	208.5
2019	Profi-Car Team Halder	Honda Civic Type R TCR (FK8)	OSC; 1; 17	OSC; 2; 9	MST; 1; 9	MST; 2; 11	RBR; 1; 8	RBR; 2; 4	ZAN; 1; 12	ZAN; 2; 1	NÜR; 1; 12	NÜR; 2; 15	HOC; 1; 13	HOC; 2; 6	SAC; 1; 5	SAC; 2; 12	7th	249
2020	Profi-Car Team Halder	Honda Civic Type R TCR (FK8)	LAU; 1; 11	LAU; 2; 5	NÜR; 1; 3^{3}	NÜR; 2 WD	HOC; 1	HOC; 2	SAC; 1	SAC; 2	RBR; 1	RBR; 2	ZAN; 1	ZAN; 2	OSC; 1	OSC; 2	11th	43

=== Complete TCR Europe Touring Car Series results ===
(key) (Races in bold indicate pole position) (Races in italics indicate fastest lap)

Year	Team	Car	1	2	3	4	5	6	7	8	9	10	11	12	13	14	DC	Points
2020	Profi-Car Team Halder	Honda Civic Type R TCR (FK8)	LEC; 1; 12	LEC; 2; 13	ZOL; 1; 7^{9}	ZOL; 2; 1	MNZ; 1; 8	MNZ; 2; 11	CAT; 1; 21	CAT; 2; 7	SPA; 1; 16	SPA; 2 Ret	JAR; 1; 17	JAR; 2; 15			15th	115
2022	Profi-Car Team Halder	Honda Civic Type R TCR (FK8)	ALG; 1; 14	ALG; 2; 14	LEC; 1; 16	LEC; 2; 15	SPA; 1; 16	SPA; 2; 14	NOR; 1; 16	NOR; 2; 13	NÜR; 1 Ret	NÜR; 2 C	MNZ; 1 Ret	MNZ; 2; 18	CAT; 1; 16	CAT; 2 Ret	21st	19

^{†} Driver did not finish, but was classified as he completed over 75% of the race distance.

=== Complete Nürburgring 24 Hours results ===
Year	Team	Co-Drivers	Car	Class	Laps	Ovr. Pos.	Class Pos.
2024^{1}	(Germany) Four Motors	(Denmark) Henrik Bollerslev (Germany) Thomas von Löwis of Menar (Germany) "Smudo"	Porsche 911 (992) GT3 Cup	AT2	44	53rd	**1st**
2025	(Germany) Four Motors	(Germany) Ralf-Peter Bonk (Netherlands) Marco van Ramshorst (Germany) "Smudo"	Porsche 911 (992) GT3 Cup	AT2	127	27th	**3rd**
2026	(Germany) WS Racing	(Germany) Janina Schall (Germany) Carrie Schreiner (Liechtenstein) Fabienne Wohlwend	Porsche 911 (992) GT3 Cup	AT2	0	WD	

- **^1** – Race was shortened due to inclement weather conditions.
