= Mike Halder =

German racing driver (born 1996)

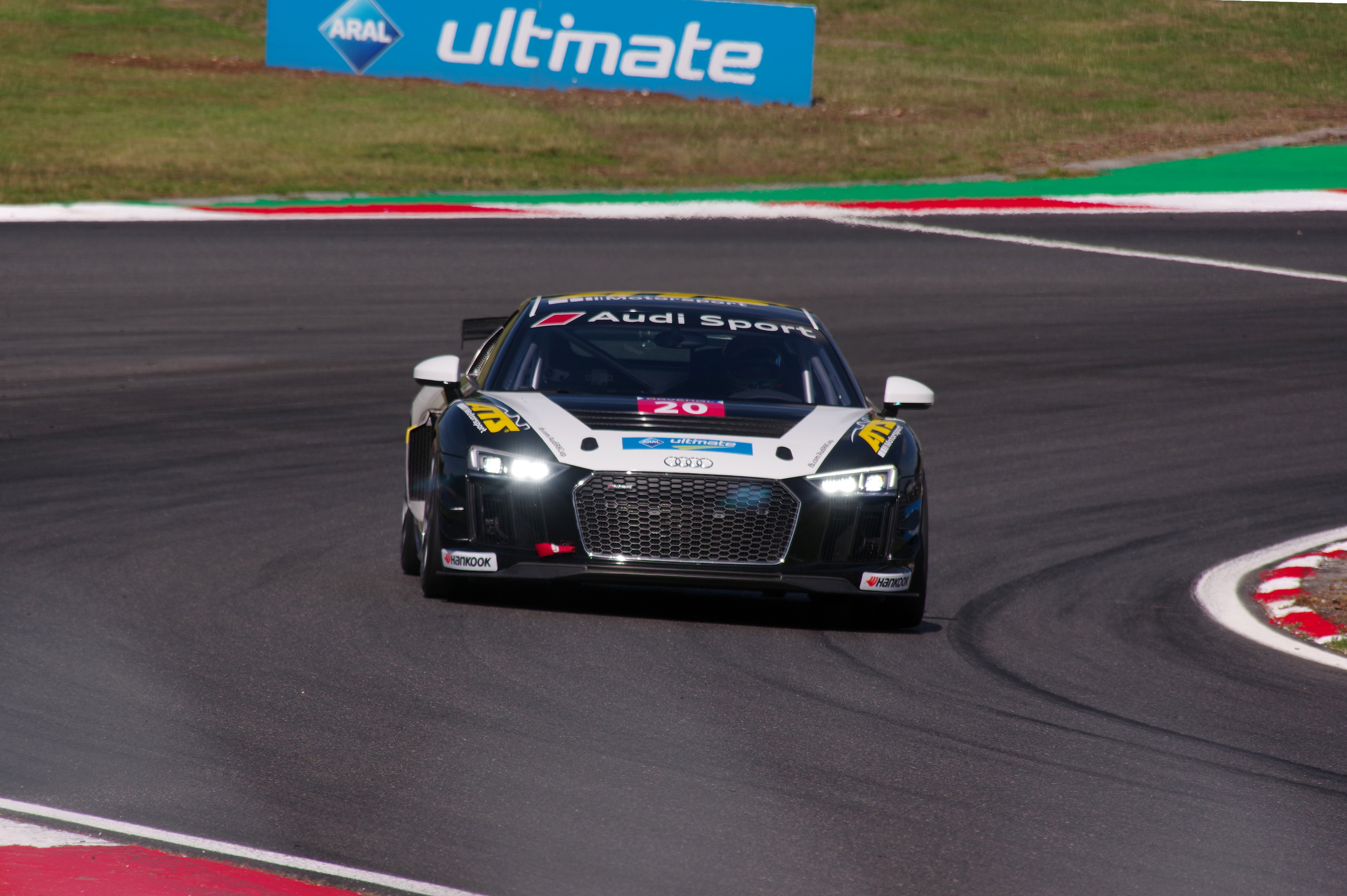
- Halder at Brands Hatch in 2018
- Born: Mike Halder; 2 May 1996 (age 30); Überlingen am Bodensee, Germany
- Nationality: (Germany) German
- Relatives: Michelle Halder (sister)
- Categorisation: FIA Silver

Championship titles
- 2021, 2025 2021: TCR Spain; TCR Ibérico Sprint

Mike Halder (born 2 May 1996) is a German racing driver who last competed for ALM Motorsport in TCR Europe.

== Personal life ==
Halder is the brother of fellow racing driver Michelle Halder.

== Career ==
Halder began karting at the age of five, competing until 2013. During his karting career, Halder won the 2013 IAME International Final in the X30 Class, and was also runner-up in the KZ2 class of the ADAC Kart Bundesendlauf that same year.

Stepping up to cars in 2014, Halder spent two years in Porsche Carrera Cup Germany before switching to Touring cars for 2016 as he joined Wolf-Power Racing to race in the inaugural season of the ADAC TCR Germany Touring Car Championship. In his first season in the series, Halder scored three podiums, with two of those being second-place finishes en route to a sixth-place points finish at the end of the year.

The following year, Halder remained in the series, albeit switching to Wolf-Power Racing for his sophomore season. After taking his first podiums of the year at the Red Bull Ring by finishing second and third in the two races, Halder then took his maiden series pole at the Nürburgring before finishing second in race one. In the final two rounds of the season at Sachsenring and Hockenheimring, Halder finished on the podium in all but one race to secure runner-up honors in the championship.

Switching to Honda ADAC Sachsen for 2018, Halder took his maiden win in TCR competition in the season-opening round at Oschersleben. Following this, Halder took two more wins at Nürburgring and at the Hockenheimring, which helped him end the year fourth in points. During 2018, Halder also made a one-off appearance in TCR Europe for KCMG at Barcelona, in which he won race two.

Remaining with Honda ADAC Sachsen for 2019, Halder won at Oschersleben and Most to take an early championship lead. However, in the final five rounds of the season, Halder only scored four podiums as he ended the year fourth in points. Halder returned to the series for 2020, but left the series with immediate effect after being disqualified from race one at the Nürburgring. Switching to TCR Europe and Halder Motorsport for the rest of the season, Halder won at Le Castellet and Barcelona as he secured fourth in points.

After winning both the TCR Spain and TCR Iberico titles in 2021, Halder remained with his family-owned team to race in TCR Europe and joined TPR Motorsport to compete in TCR Denmark. In the former, Halder took a lone win at the Norisring and ended the year on his way to eighth in points despite missing the round at the Nürburgring to focus on TCR Denmark. In the latter, Halder took his first series wins at Jyllandsringen, before taking further wins at Copenhagen and at the final two Jyllandsringen rounds to finish runner-up in the standings, missing the title by 11 points.

Staying with TPR Motorsport to focus on TCR Denmark for 2023, finished in the top five in all six races of the first two rounds before taking his first win of the season at Falkenbergs Motorbana in race two. Halder then scored one win in each of the final three rounds of the season at Jyllandsringen and Padborg Park to once again finish second in points, this time 28 away from Kasper Jensen.

Halder remained with TPR Motorsport for his third season in TCR Denmark, taking five wins but losing out to the title after colliding with Jensen in the penultimate race of the season and ended the year 37 points adrift from the Dane. During 2024, Halder also made a one-off appearance in TCR Spain at Barcelona for the same team, in which he dominated the weekend by winning both races.

The following year, Halder competed in both TCR Denmark and TCR Spain on a full-time basis. In Denmark, Halder won the season opening round at Padborg Park, before then winning five races across the following three rounds, as he ended the year third in points after the team skipped the final round to race in the Spanish series. In TCR Spain, Halder won five races and stood on the podium in all but one race to secure his second TCR Spain title at the finale in Barcelona.

In 2026, Halder returned to TCR Europe with ALM Motorsport. On his return to the series, Halder scored a pair of podiums at Mugello and Barcelona en route to runner-up honours overall.

== Karting record ==
=== Karting career summary ===
Season	Series	Team	Position
2009	Rotax Max Challenge World Finals – Junior Max	Team DMV	24th
2010	Rotax Max Wintercup – Junior Max		30th
2011	Rotax Euro Challenge – DD2	Team DMV	38th
2011	24 Hours of Leipzig	Team WEITRACON	7th
2011	TAG Challenge International – Shifter	Wildkart Racing	3rd
2012	24 Hours of Leipzig	Team WEITRACON	9th
2012	IAME International Final – X30 Super Shifter		3rd
2013	ADAC Kart Bundesendlauf – KZ2		2nd
2013	ADAC Kart Masters – KZ2		5th
2013	X30 Challenge Europe – X30 Shifter	Wild Kart Racing Team	3rd
2013	IAME International Final – X30 Super Shifter		1st

== Racing record ==
=== Racing career summary ===
Season	Series	Team	Races	Wins	Poles	F/Laps	Podiums	Points	Position
2014	Porsche Carrera Cup Germany	SMS Seyffarth Motorsport	18	0	0	0	0	19	23rd
2015	Porsche Carrera Cup Germany	Aust Motorsport	7	0	0	0	0	21	18th
2016	ADAC TCR Germany Touring Car Championship	Liqui Moly Team Engstler	14	0	0	0	3	111	6th
2017	ADAC TCR Germany Touring Car Championship	Wolf-Power Racing	14	0	1	2	6	346	**2nd**
2018	ADAC TCR Germany Touring Car Championship	Honda ADAC Sachsen	14	3	3	4	7	366	4th
2018	TCR Swiss Trophy	Hell Energy Racing with KCMG	2	0	0	0	0	12	24th
2018	TCR Ibérico Touring Car Series	Hell Energy Racing with KCMG	2	1	0	0	1	25	**3rd**
2018	TCR Europe Touring Car Series	Hell Energy Racing with KCMG	2	1	0	0	1	25	18th
2018	Audi Sport Seyffarth R8 LMS Cup		2	0	0	0	0	0	NC
2019	ADAC TCR Germany Touring Car Championship	Profi-Car Team Honda ADAC Sachsen	14	2	0	2	7	399	4th
2019	VLN Series – SP3	Profi-Car Team Halder	1	0	0	0	0	0	NC
2019	VLN Series – V4	Lubner Motorsport	3	0	0	0	0	8.69	69th
2019	VLN Series – V4		1	0	0	0	0	8.69	69th
2019	VLN Series – V4	Scuderia Solagon	1	0	0	0	0	8.69	69th
2020	ADAC TCR Germany Touring Car Championship	Profi-Car Team Honda ADAC Sachsen	3	0	0	0	1	22	13th
2020	TCR Europe Touring Car Series	Profi-Car Team Halder	12	2	0	0	4	242	4th
2020	Nürburgring Langstrecken-Serie – TCR Am	Profi-Car Team Halder	2	0	0	0	1	2.5	6th
2020	Nürburgring Langstrecken-Serie – SP3T	Profi-Car Team Halder	2	0	0	0	0	0	NC
2020	TCR Iberico	Profi-Car Team Halder						37	4th
2021	TCR Spain	Profi Car Team Halder	15	8	1	0	13	371	**1st**
2021	Nürburgring Langstrecken-Serie – SP3T	Profi Car Team Halder	8	0	0	0	6	29.4	4th
2021	TCR Ibérico Sprint	Profi Car Team Halder						129	**1st**
2022	TCR Europe Touring Car Series	Profi-Car Team Halder	12	1	2	0	3	228	8th
2022	TCR Denmark Touring Car Series	TPR Motorsport	21	7	3	8	16	417	**2nd**
2023	TCR Denmark Touring Car Series	TPR Motorsport	21	4	0	3	8	334	**2nd**
2023	Nürburgring Langstrecken-Serie – TCR	Halder Motorsport	6	1	0	0	1	0	NC
2024	Porsche Endurance Trophy Nürburgring – CUP2	Halder Motorsport	2	0	0	0	0	18	25th
2024	TCR Denmark Touring Car Series	TPR Motorsport	18	5	1	10	15	455	**2nd**
2024	TCR Spain Touring Car Championship	TPR Motorsport	2	2	1	2	2	90	9th
2025	TCR Denmark Touring Car Series	TPR Motorsport	14	6	1	3	13	383.5	**3rd**
2025	TCR Spain Touring Car Championship	TPR Motorsport	10	5	2	5	9	372	**1st**
2025	Nürburgring Langstrecken-Serie – TCR	ALM Motorsport	1	0	0	0	0	0	NC
2025	GT Cup Open Europe – Pro-Am	Halder Motorsport	2	0	0	0	1	0	NC†
2026	TCR Europe Touring Car Series	ALM Motorsport	12	0	1	0	2	197	**2nd**

=== Complete ADAC TCR Germany Touring Car Championship results ===
(key) (Races in bold indicate pole position) (Races in italics indicate fastest lap)

Year	Team	Car	1	2	3	4	5	6	7	8	9	10	11	12	13	14	DC	Points
2016	Liqui Moly Team Engstler	SEAT León Cup Racer	OSC; 1; 7	OSC; 2; 5	SAC; 1; 4	SAC; 2; 17	OSC; 1; 2	OSC; 2; 4	RBR; 1; 8	RBR; 2; 12	NÜR; 1; 8	NÜR; 2; 2	ZAN; 1; 6^{4}	ZAN; 2; 3	HOC; 1; 11	HOC; 2 Ret	6th	111
2017	Wolf-Power Racing	SEAT León TCR	OSC; 1; 15	OSC; 2 Ret	RBR; 1; 2^{5}	RBR; 2; 3	OSC; 1; 14	OSC; 2; 8	ZAN; 1; 15^{2}	ZAN; 2; 4	**NÜR**; **1**; 2^{1}	NÜR; 2; 4	SAC; 1; 3	SAC; 2; 2	HOC; 1; 2^{4}	HOC; 2; 4	2nd	346
2018	Honda ADAC Sachsen	Honda Civic Type R TCR (FK8)	**OSC**; **1**; 24^{1}	OSC; 2; 1	**MST**; **1**; 2^{1}	MST; 2; 10	RBR; 1; 4^{4}	RBR; 2 Ret	**NÜR**; **1**; 1^{1}	NÜR; 2; 3	ZAN; 1; 4^{5}	ZAN; 2; 5	SAC; 1; 2^{2}	SAC; 2 Ret	HOC; 1; 2^{3}	HOC; 2; 1	4th	366
2019	Profi-Car Team Honda ADAC Sachsen	Honda Civic Type R TCR (FK8)	OSC; 1; 1^{2}	OSC; 2; 2	MST; 1; 1^{2}	MST; 2; 4	RBR; 1; 15	RBR; 2; 8	ZAN; 1; 2^{4}	ZAN; 2; 3	NÜR; 1; 16^{2}	NÜR; 2; 4	HOC; 1; 4^{4}	HOC; 2; 5	SAC; 1; 3^{2}	SAC; 2; 4	4th	399
2020	Profi-Car Team Honda ADAC Sachsen	Honda Civic Type R TCR (FK8)	LAU; 1; 2	LAU; 2 Ret	NÜR; 1 DSQ^{2}	NÜR; 2 WD	HOC; 1	HOC; 2	SAC; 1	SAC; 2	RBR; 1	RBR; 2	ZAN; 1	ZAN; 2	OSC; 1	OSC; 2	11th	43

=== Complete TCR Europe Touring Car Series results ===
(key) (Races in bold indicate pole position) (Races in italics indicate fastest lap)

Year	Team	Car	1	2	3	4	5	6	7	8	9	10	11	12	13	14	DC	Points
2018	Hell Energy Racing with KCMG	Honda Civic Type R TCR (FK8)	LEC; 1	LEC; 2	ZAN; 1	ZAN; 2	SPA; 1	SPA; 2	HUN; 1	HUN; 2	ASS; 1	ASS; 2	MNZ; 1	MNZ; 2	CAT; 1 Ret	CAT; 2; 1	18th	25
2020	Profi-Car Team Halder	Honda Civic Type R TCR (FK8)	LEC; 1; 10^{10}	LEC; 2; 1	ZOL; 1; 2^{5}	ZOL; 2; 4	MNZ; 1; 18†^{9}	MNZ; 2 Ret	CAT; 1; 1^{2}	CAT; 2; 4	SPA; 1; 3^{8}	SPA; 2; 10	JAR; 1 Ret	JAR; 2 Ret			4th	242
2022	Profi-Car Team Halder	Honda Civic Type R TCR (FK8)	**ALG**; **1**; 2	ALG; 2; 9	LEC; 1; 10	LEC; 2 Ret	SPA; 1; 13	SPA; 2; 13	**NOR**; **1**; 1	NOR; 2; 7	NÜR; 1	NÜR; 2	MNZ; 1; 3	MNZ; 2; 12	CAT; 1; 10	CAT; 2; 4	8th	228
2026	ALM Motorsport	Honda Civic Type R TCR (FL5)	MUG; 1; 5^{4}	MUG; 2; 3	SPA; 1; 4^{4}	SPA; 2; 4	HUN; 1; 17^{2}	HUN; 2; 14	MIS; 1; 4	MIS; 2; 10	MNZ; 1; 17^{4}	MNZ; 2; 7	**CAT**; **1**; 2^{1}	CAT; 2; 8			2nd	197

^{†} Halder did not finish, but was classified as he completed over 75% of the race distance.
