= Halder Motorsport =

Auto racing team in Germany

(Germany) Halder Motorsport
- Team principal(s): Mike Halder
- Current series: NLS Series; TCR Europe Touring Car Series
- Former series: ADAC TCR Germany Touring Car Championship
- Current drivers: (Germany) Mike Halder (Germany) Michelle Halder (United Kingdom) Jack Young
- Website: http://motorsport-halder.de/

Halder Motorsport (competing as Profi Car Team Halder) is a German auto racing team based in Meßkirch, Germany, run by siblings Mike and Michelle Halder. The team has previously competed in the TCR Europe Touring Car Series and the ADAC TCR Germany Touring Car Championship.

== ADAC TCR Germany Touring Car Championship ==
The team made its début in the 2018 ADAC TCR Germany Touring Car Championship with the help of Fugel Sport fielding a CUPRA León TCR for Michelle Halder and a Honda Civic Type R TCR (FK2). The team's best finish during this season was two second places by Halder in the second race at the Autodrom Most and in the second race at the Sachsenring. In the overall standings Halder finished 9th, while Fugel finished 23rd. In the teams' classification the team finished 8th.

For the next season the team entered a single Honda Civic Type R TCR (FK8) for Halder, while Marcel Fugel was entered in the older Civic at selected events as a guest driver. At the Circuit Zandvoort Halder managed to score her first win in the second race, which helped her finish 7th in the drivers' standings while the team was classified 6th.

For the 2020 season Michelle was joined in the team by her brother Mike, who moved from the Profi-Car Team Honda ADAC Sachsen team. However the team abruptly withdrew from the series during the second round at the Nürburgring following a disqualification of Mike Halder (who competed for the Profi-Car Team Honda ADAC Sachsen team) for parc fermé irregularities with Michelle Halder inheriting the full championship points. (Note: The actual race winner was Norbert Michelisz, but since he was registered as guest driver he was ineligible for championship points. After Mike Halder (who finished second) was disqualified, Michelle Halder (who moved to third place) took the full championship points since Andreas Bäckman (who was promoted to 2nd) was also registered as guest driver.)

== TCR Europe Touring Car Series ==
Following their withdrawal from the ADAC TCR Germany Touring Car Championship, both Halder siblings moved to the TCR Europe Touring Car Series again racing under the Profi Car Team Halder banner entering their two Honda Civic Type R TCR (FK8) cars.
