= 2025 GT2 European Series =

Fifth season of the GT2 European Series

The 2025 GT2 European Series Powered by Pirelli was a motor racing championship for GT2 cars and was the 5th running of the GT2 European Series. It was organised by SRO Motorsports Group. The championship was contested over twelve races at six rounds held at European circuits between April and October. Races were run in support of the GT World Challenge Europe, and also the Intercontinental GT Challenge at the 2025 24 Hours of Spa.

Czechoslovak duo Štefan Rosina and Broněk Formánek took the Pro-Am title for Mičánek Motorsport, with Philippe Prette victorious in the Am category for LP Racing.

== Calendar ==
Round	Circuit	Date	Supporting
1	(France) Circuit Paul Ricard	11–13 April	GT World Challenge Europe Endurance Cup
2	(Netherlands) Circuit Zandvoort	16–18 May	GT World Challenge Europe Sprint Cup
3	(Belgium) Circuit de Spa-Francorchamps	26–29 June	Intercontinental GT Challenge; GT World Challenge Europe Endurance Cup
4	(Italy) Misano World Circuit Marco Simoncelli	18–20 July	GT World Challenge Europe Sprint Cup
5	(Spain) Circuit Ricardo Tormo	19–21 September	GT World Challenge Europe Sprint Cup
6	(Spain) Circuit de Barcelona-Catalunya	10–12 October	GT World Challenge Europe Endurance Cup

== Series news ==
- For this season, the GT2 European Series will switch to Pirelli's new P Zero DHG tyres, as the SRO Motorsports Group adopts these for all its GT2, GT3 and GT4 championships in 2025. They feature FSC-certified natural rubber. The DHG replaces the DHF, which has been used globally for three years. It includes a wider working range and optimised construction for better grip and uniformity. Pirelli, SRO's exclusive tyre supplier since 2013, will continue its partnership until at least 2028.
- The race lengths have also been extended from 50 minutes per race to 60 minutes per race. This provides drivers with an additional 20 minutes of racing time each weekend.
- The Ginetta G56 GT2 made its racing debut at the final round of the 2025 GT2 European Series. It will be entered by French outfit CMR, driven by British drivers Lawrence, who acts as Ginetta's chairman, and Freddie Tomlinson.

== Entries ==
Entrant	Car	Engine	No.	Class	Drivers	Rounds
(Italy) LP Racing	Maserati MC20 GT2	Maserati Nettuno 3.0 L twin-turbocharged V6	1	Am	(Italy) Philippe Prette	All
(Italy) LP Racing	Maserati MC20 GT2	Maserati Nettuno 3.0 L twin-turbocharged V6	8	PA	(Italy) Eddie Cheever III	1
(Italy) LP Racing	Maserati MC20 GT2	Maserati Nettuno 3.0 L twin-turbocharged V6	8	PA	(United States) Anik Patel	1
(Italy) LP Racing	Maserati MC20 GT2	Maserati Nettuno 3.0 L twin-turbocharged V6	8	Am	(Switzerland) Jean-Denis Deletraz	6
(Italy) LP Racing	Maserati MC20 GT2	Maserati Nettuno 3.0 L twin-turbocharged V6	8	Am	(France) Stéphane Ratel	6
(Italy) LP Racing	Audi R8 LMS GT2	Audi DAR 5.2 L V10	88	PA	(Italy) Daniele Cazzaniga	3
(Italy) LP Racing	Audi R8 LMS GT2	Audi DAR 5.2 L V10	88	PA	(Italy) Gianluca Giorgi	3
(Italy) LP Racing	Audi R8 LMS GT2	Audi DAR 5.2 L V10	88	Am	(Italy) Luca Pirri	4–5
(Italy) LP Racing	Audi R8 LMS GT2	Audi DAR 5.2 L V10	88	Am	(France) Stéphane Ratel	4
(Italy) LP Racing	Audi R8 LMS GT2	Audi DAR 5.2 L V10	88	PA	(Germany) Otto Blank	6
(Italy) LP Racing	Audi R8 LMS GT2	Audi DAR 5.2 L V10	88	PA	(Germany) Pierre Kaffer	6
(Italy) Dinamic Motorsport	Maserati MC20 GT2	Maserati Nettuno 3.0 L twin-turbocharged V6	7	PA	(Switzerland) Mauro Calamia	All
(Italy) Dinamic Motorsport	Maserati MC20 GT2	Maserati Nettuno 3.0 L twin-turbocharged V6	7	PA	(Italy) Roberto Pampanini	All
(United Arab Emirates) Micanek Motorsport powered by Buggyra	Lamborghini Huracán Super Trofeo Evo2 GT2	Lamborghini DGF 5.2 L V10	11	PA	(Czech Republic) Bronek Formanek	1–5
(United Arab Emirates) Micanek Motorsport powered by Buggyra	Lamborghini Huracán Super Trofeo Evo2 GT2	Lamborghini DGF 5.2 L V10	11	PA	(Slovakia) Stefan Rosina	1–5
(Kazakhstan) ART-Line	Lamborghini Huracán Super Trofeo Evo2 GT2	Lamborghini DGF 5.2 L V10	12	PA	Shota Abkhazava	4
(Kazakhstan) ART-Line	Lamborghini Huracán Super Trofeo Evo2 GT2	Lamborghini DGF 5.2 L V10	12	PA	Egor Orudzhev	4
(Germany) AKF Motorsport	Lamborghini Huracán Super Trofeo Evo2 GT2	Lamborghini DGF 5.2 L V10	24	Am	(Germany) Oliver Freymuth	1–3, 5–6
(France) TFT Racing	Maserati MC20 GT2	Maserati Nettuno 3.0 L twin-turbocharged V6	28	Am	(France) Jordan Boisson	1
(France) TFT Racing	Maserati MC20 GT2	Maserati Nettuno 3.0 L twin-turbocharged V6	28	Am	(France) Patrick Charlaix	1
(France) Akkodis ASP Team	Mercedes-AMG GT2	Mercedes-AMG M178 4.0 L twin-turbocharged V8	53	Am	(France) Christophe Bourret	1–4
(France) Akkodis ASP Team	Mercedes-AMG GT2	Mercedes-AMG M178 4.0 L twin-turbocharged V8	53	Am	(France) Pascal Gibon	1–4
(France) CMR	Ginetta G56 GT2	Ginetta 6.2 L LTR V8	62	PA	(United Kingdom) Freddie Tomlinson	6
(France) CMR	Ginetta G56 GT2	Ginetta 6.2 L LTR V8	62	PA	(United Kingdom) Lawrence Tomlinson	6
(Italy) DL Racing	Lamborghini Huracán Super Trofeo Evo2 GT2	Lamborghini DGF 5.2 L V10	72	PA	(Italy) Diego Locanto	4
(Italy) DL Racing	Lamborghini Huracán Super Trofeo Evo2 GT2	Lamborghini DGF 5.2 L V10	72	PA	(Italy) Luca Segù	4
(Austria) Razoon – more than racing	KTM X-Bow GT2	Audi TFSI 2.5 L I5	80	PA	(Denmark) Thomas Andersen	1
(Austria) Razoon – more than racing	KTM X-Bow GT2	Audi TFSI 2.5 L I5	80	PA	(Denmark) Simon Birch	1
(Czech Republic) RTR Projects	KTM X-Bow GT2	Audi TFSI 2.5 L I5	89	PA	(Slovakia) Mato Homola	All
(Czech Republic) RTR Projects	KTM X-Bow GT2	Audi TFSI 2.5 L I5	89	PA	(Georgia (country)) Davit Kajaia	3–5
(Czech Republic) RTR Projects	KTM X-Bow GT2	Audi TFSI 2.5 L I5	89	PA	(Austria) Laura Kraihamer	1–2
(Czech Republic) RTR Projects	KTM X-Bow GT2	Audi TFSI 2.5 L I5	89	PA	(Germany) Lennart Marioneck	6
(Czech Republic) RTR Projects	KTM X-Bow GT2	Audi TFSI 2.5 L I5	789	Am	(Slovakia) Viktor Mraz	1, 3–4
(Czech Republic) RTR Projects	KTM X-Bow GT2	Audi TFSI 2.5 L I5	789	Am	(Czech Republic) Petr Lisa	3–4
(Czech Republic) RTR Projects	KTM X-Bow GT2	Audi TFSI 2.5 L I5	789	Am	(Czech Republic) Tomas Miniberger	1
(Czech Republic) RTR Projects	Mercedes-AMG GT2	Mercedes-AMG M178 4.0 L twin-turbocharged V8	294	Am	(Czech Republic) Petr Lisa	1–2, 5–6
(Czech Republic) RTR Projects	Mercedes-AMG GT2	Mercedes-AMG M178 4.0 L twin-turbocharged V8	294	Am	(Czech Republic) Ondrej Rokos	1–2, 5–6
(Spain) NM Racing Team	Mercedes-AMG GT2	Mercedes-AMG M178 4.0 L twin-turbocharged V8	115	PA	(Spain) Alberto De Martin	All
(Spain) NM Racing Team	Mercedes-AMG GT2	Mercedes-AMG M178 4.0 L twin-turbocharged V8	115	PA	(Spain) Nil Montserrat	All
(Austria) MZR Motorsportzentrum Ried	KTM X-Bow GT2	Audi TFSI 2.5 L I5	117	PA	(Austria) Marcus Aigner	6
(Austria) MZR Motorsportzentrum Ried	KTM X-Bow GT2	Audi TFSI 2.5 L I5	117	PA	(Austria) Reinhard Kofler	6

Icon	Class
PA	Pro-Am Cup
Am	Am Cup
INV	Invitational

== Results and standings ==
=== Race results ===
Bold indicates overall winner

Round		Circuit	Pole position	Pro-Am Winners	Am Winners	Results
1	R1	(France) Paul Ricard	(United Arab Emirates) No. 11 Micanek Motorsport powered by Buggyra	**(United Arab Emirates) No. 11 Micanek Motorsport powered by Buggyra**	(Italy) No. 1 LP Racing	Report
1	R1	(France) Paul Ricard	(Czech Republic) Bronek Formanek (Slovakia) Stefan Rosina	**(Czech Republic) Bronek Formanek** **(Slovakia) Stefan Rosina**	(Monaco) Philippe Prette	Report
1	R2	(France) Paul Ricard	(Italy) No. 8 LP Racing	**(United Arab Emirates) No. 11 Micanek Motorsport powered by Buggyra**	(Germany) No. 24 AKF Motorsport	Report
1	R2	(France) Paul Ricard	(Italy) Eddie Cheever III (United States) Anik Patel	**(Czech Republic) Bronek Formanek** **(Slovakia) Stefan Rosina**	(Germany) Oliver Freymuth	Report
2	R1	(Netherlands) Zandvoort	(Italy) No. 1 LP Racing	(United Arab Emirates) No. 11 Micanek Motorsport powered by Buggyra	(Italy) **No. 1 LP Racing**	Report
2	R1	(Netherlands) Zandvoort	(Italy) Philippe Prette	(Czech Republic) Bronek Formanek (Slovakia) Stefan Rosina	(Italy) **Philippe Prette**	Report
2	R2	(Netherlands) Zandvoort	(United Arab Emirates) No. 11 Micanek Motorsport powered by Buggyra	(Italy) **No. 7** **Dinamic Motorsport**	(Italy) No. 1 LP Racing	Report
2	R2	(Netherlands) Zandvoort	(Czech Republic) Bronek Formanek (Slovakia) Stefan Rosina	(Switzerland) **Mauro Calamia** **(Italy) Roberto Pampanini**	(Italy) Philippe Prette	Report
3	R1	(Belgium) Spa	(United Arab Emirates) No. 11 Micanek Motorsport powered by Buggyra	**(United Arab Emirates) No. 11 Micanek Motorsport powered by Buggyra**	(Italy) No. 1 LP Racing	Report
3	R1	(Belgium) Spa	(Czech Republic) Bronek Formanek (Slovakia) Stefan Rosina	**(Czech Republic) Bronek Formanek** **(Slovakia) Stefan Rosina**	(Italy) Philippe Prette	Report
3	R2	(Belgium) Spa	(United Arab Emirates) No. 11 Micanek Motorsport powered by Buggyra	**(United Arab Emirates) No. 11 Micanek Motorsport powered by Buggyra**	(Czech Republic) No. 789 RTR Projects	Report
3	R2	(Belgium) Spa	(Czech Republic) Bronek Formanek (Slovakia) Stefan Rosina	**(Czech Republic) Bronek Formanek** **(Slovakia) Stefan Rosina**	(Czech Republic) Petr Lisa (Slovakia) Viktor Mraz	Report
4	R1	(Italy) Misano	(Italy) No. 1 LP Racing	**(Kazakhstan) No. 12 ART-Line**	(Italy) No. 1 LP Racing	Report
4	R1	(Italy) Misano	(Italy) Philippe Prette	**Shota Abkhazava**; **Egor Orudzhev**	(Italy) Philippe Prette	Report
4	R2	(Italy) Misano	(Spain) No. 115 NM Racing Team	**(Italy) No. 72 DL Racing**	(Italy) No. 1 LP Racing	Report
4	R2	(Italy) Misano	(Spain) Alberto De Martin (Spain) Nil Montserrat	**(Italy) Diego Locanto** **(Italy) Luca Segú**	(Italy) Philippe Prette	Report
5	R1	(Spain) Valencia	(Italy) No. 1 LP Racing	(Italy) No. 7 Dinamic Motorsport	**(Italy) No. 1 LP Racing**	Report
5	R1	(Spain) Valencia	(Italy) Philippe Prette	(Switzerland) Mauro Calamia (Italy) Roberto Pampanini	**(Italy) Philippe Prette**	Report
5	R2	(Spain) Valencia	(Italy) No. 7 Dinamic Motorsport	(Spain) No. 115 NM Racing Team	**(Italy) No. 1 LP Racing**	Report
5	R2	(Spain) Valencia	(Switzerland) Mauro Calamia (Italy) Roberto Pampanini	(Spain) Alberto De Martin (Spain) Nil Montserrat	**(Italy) Philippe Prette**	Report
6	R1	(Spain) Barcelona	(Czech Republic) No. 89 RTR Projects	(Spain) No. 115 NM Racing Team	**(Italy) No. 1 LP Racing**	Report
6	R1	(Spain) Barcelona	(Slovakia) Mato Homola (Germany) Lennart Marioneck	(Spain) Alberto De Martin (Spain) Nil Montserrat	**(Italy) Philippe Prette**	Report
6	R2	(Spain) Barcelona	(Italy) No. 7 Dinamic Motorsport	**(Czech Republic) No. 89 RTR Projects**	(Italy) No. 1 LP Racing	Report
6	R2	(Spain) Barcelona	(Switzerland) Mauro Calamia (Italy) Roberto Pampanini	**(Slovakia) Mato Homola** **(Germany) Lennart Marioneck**	(Italy) Philippe Prette	Report

=== Scoring system ===
Championship points are awarded for the first ten positions in each race. Entries are required to complete 75% of the winning car's race distance in order to be classified and earn points.

Position	**1st**	**2nd**	**3rd**	**4th**	**5th**	**6th**	**7th**	**8th**	**9th**	**10th**	**Pole**
Points	25	18	15	12	10	8	6	4	2	1	1

=== Drivers' championships ===
==== Pro-Am drivers' championship ====
Pos.	Driver	Team	LEC (France)		ZAN (Netherlands)		SPA (Belgium)		MIS (Italy)		VAL (Spain)		BAR (Spain)		Points
1	(Czech Republic) Bronek Formanek (Slovakia) Stefan Rosina	(United Arab Emirates) Micanek Motorsport powered by Buggyra	1^{P}	1	1^{P}	2^{P}	1^{P}	1^{P}	5	3	3	2			206
2	(Spain) Alberto De Martin (Spain) Nil Montserrat	(Spain) NM Racing Team	3	2	4	3	5	4	2	Ret^{P}	4	1	3	5	181
3	(Switzerland) Mauro Calamia (Italy) Roberto Pampanini	(Italy) Dinamic Motorsport	5	3	2	1	2	3	6	2	1	Ret^{P}	4	Ret^{P}	172
4	(Slovakia) Mato Homola	(Czech Republic) RTR Projects	4	Ret	3	Ret	3	2	4	5	2^{P}	Ret	DNS^{P}	1	127
5	(Georgia (country)) Davit Kajaia	(Czech Republic) RTR Projects					3	2	4	5					55
6	(Italy) Diego Locanto (Italy) Luca Segú	(Italy) DL Racing							3	1					40
7	Shota Abkhazava; Egor Orudzhev	(Kazakhstan) ART-Line							1^{P}	4					38
8	(Denmark) Thomas Anderson (Denmark) Simon Birch	(Austria) Razoon - more than racing	2	4											30
9	(Austria) Laura Kraihamer	(Czech Republic) RTR Projects	4	Ret	3	Ret									27
10	(Slovakia) Viktor Mraz	(Czech Republic) RTR Projects									2^{P}	Ret			19
11	(Italy) Daniele Cazzaniga (Italy) Gianluca Giorgi	(Italy) LP Racing					4	Ret							12
12	(Italy) Eddie Cheever III (United States) Anik Patel	(Italy) LP Racing	Ret	DNS^{P}											1
Not classified
-	(Germany) Otto Blank (Germany) Pierre Kaffer	(Italy) LP Racing											1	4	0
-	(Germany) Lennart Marioneck	(Czech Republic) RTR Projects											DNS^{P}	1	0
-	(United Kingdom) Freddie Tomlinson (United Kingdom) Lawrence Tomlison	(France) CMR											2	3	0
-	(Austria) Marcus Aigner (Austria) Reinhard Kofler	(Austria) MZR Motorsportzentrum Ried											5	2	0
Pos.	Driver	Team	LEC (France)		ZAN (Netherlands)		SPA (Belgium)		MIS (Italy)		VAL (Spain)		BAR (Spain)		Points

Colour	Result
Gold	Winner
Silver	Second place
Bronze	Third place
Green	Points classification
Blue	Non-points classification
Blue	Non-classified finish (NC)
Purple	Retired, not classified (Ret)
Red	Did not qualify (DNQ)
Red	Did not pre-qualify (DNPQ)
Black	Disqualified (DSQ)
White	Did not start (DNS)
White	Withdrew (WD)
White	Race cancelled (C)
Blank	Did not practice (DNP)
Blank	Did not arrive (DNA)
Blank	Excluded (EX)

- **^{P}** - Pole position

==== Am drivers' championship ====
Pos.	Driver	Team	LEC (France)		ZAN (Netherlands)		SPA (Belgium)		MIS (Italy)		VAL (Spain)		BAR (Spain)		Points
1	(Italy) Philippe Prette	(Italy) LP Racing	1^{P}	4	1^{P}	1	1^{P}	4^{P}	1^{P}	1^{P}	1^{P}	1^{P}	1^{P}	1^{P}	284
2	(Czech Republic) Petr Lisa	(Czech Republic) RTR Projects	6	3^{P}	2	3^{P}	Ret	1	3	4	3	3	3	2	173
3	(Germany) Oliver Freymuth	(Germany) AFK Motorsport	3	1	4	4	2	3			4	4	4	3	148
4	(France) Christophe Bourret (France) Pascal Gibon	(France) AKKODIS ASP Team	2	2	3	2	3	2	4	3					129
5	(Czech Republic) Ondrej Rokos	(Czech Republic) RTR Projects	6	3^{P}	2	3^{P}					3	3	3	2	121
6	(Italy) Luca Pirri	(Italy) LP Racing							2	2	2	2			72
7	(Slovakia) Viktor Mraz	(Czech Republic) RTR Projects	5	Ret			Ret	1	3	4					62
8	(France) Stéphane Ratel	(Italy) LP Racing							2	2			2	Ret	54
9	(France) Jordan Boison (France) Patrick Charlaix	(France) TFT Racing	4	5											22
10	(Czech Republic) Tomas Miniberger	(Czech Republic) RTR Projects	5	Ret											10
Not classified
-	(Switzerland) Jean-Denis Deletraz	(Italy) LP Racing											2	Ret	0
Pos.	Driver	Team	LEC (France)		ZAN (Netherlands)		SPA (Belgium)		MIS (Italy)		VAL (Spain)		BAR (Spain)		Points

=== Teams' championships ===
==== Pro-Am teams' championship ====
Pos.	Team	LEC (France)		ZAN (Netherlands)		SPA (Belgium)		MIS (Italy)		VAL (Spain)		BAR (Spain)		Points
1	(United Arab Emirates) Micanek Motorsport powered by Buggyra	1^{P}	1	1^{P}	2^{P}	1^{P}	1^{P}	5	3	3	2			206
2	(Italy) Dinamic Motorsport	5	3	2	1	2	3	6	2	1	Ret^{P}	4	Ret^{P}	166
3	(Spain) NM Racing Team	3	2	4	3	5	4	2	Ret	4	1	3	5	163
4	(Czech Republic) RTR Projects	4	Ret	3	Ret	3	2	4	5	2^{P}	Ret	Ret^{P}	1	127
5	(Italy) LP Racing	Ret	DNS^{P}			4	Ret					1	4	50
6	(Italy) DL Racing							3	1					40
7	(Kazakhstan) ART-Line							1^{P}	4					38
8	(France) CMR											2	3	33
9	(Austria) Razoon - more than racing	2	4											30
10	(Austria) MZR Motorsportzentrum Ried											5	2	28
Pos.	Team	LEC (France)		ZAN (Netherlands)		SPA (Belgium)		MIS (Italy)		VAL (Spain)		BAR (Spain)		Points

Colour	Result
Gold	Winner
Silver	Second place
Bronze	Third place
Green	Points classification
Blue	Non-points classification
Blue	Non-classified finish (NC)
Purple	Retired, not classified (Ret)
Red	Did not qualify (DNQ)
Red	Did not pre-qualify (DNPQ)
Black	Disqualified (DSQ)
White	Did not start (DNS)
White	Withdrew (WD)
White	Race cancelled (C)
Blank	Did not practice (DNP)
Blank	Did not arrive (DNA)
Blank	Excluded (EX)

- **^{P}** - Pole position

==== Am teams' championship ====
Pos.	Team	LEC (France)		ZAN (Netherlands)		SPA (Belgium)		MIS (Italy)		VAL (Spain)		BAR (Spain)		Points
1	(Italy) LP Racing	1^{P}	4	1^{P}	1	1^{P}	4^{P}	1^{P}	1^{P}	1^{P}	1^{P}	1^{P}	1^{P}	284
2	(Czech Republic) RTR Projects	5	3^{P}	2	3^{P}	Ret	1	3	3	3	3	3	2	190
3	(Germany) AFK Motorsport	3	1	4	4	2	3			4	4	4	3	157
4	(France) AKKODIS ASP Team	2	2	3	2	3	2	4	2					135
5	(France) TFT Racing	4	5											22
Pos.	Team	LEC (France)		ZAN (Netherlands)		SPA (Belgium)		MIS (Italy)		VAL (Spain)		BAR (Spain)		Points

Notes:

- † – Entry did not finish the race but was classified, as it completed more than 75% of the race distance.
