= 2026 GT2 European Series =

Sixth season of the GT2 European Series

The 2026 GT2 European Series Powered by Pirelli was the 6th season of the GT2 European Series for GT2 cars. It was organised by SRO Motorsports Group. The championship was contested over five rounds, with two races per round, in support of the 2026 GT World Challenge Europe season and the 2026 British GT Championship. It started in May of 2026 and finished in October.

== Calendar ==
Round	Circuit	Date	Supporting
1	(Italy) Monza Circuit	28–31 May	GT World Challenge Europe Endurance Cup
2	(Belgium) Circuit de Spa-Francorchamps	19–21 June	British GT Championship
3	(Italy) Misano World Circuit	16–19 July	GT World Challenge Europe Sprint Cup
4	(Netherlands) Circuit Zandvoort	18–20 September	GT World Challenge Europe Sprint Cup
5	(Portugal) Algarve International Circuit	17–18 October	GT World Challenge Europe Endurance Cup

=== Calendar changes ===
For 2026, the GT2 European Series reduced the number of rounds from 6 to 5. In contrast to 2025, the series raced at the Monza Circuit for the season opener and at the Algarve International Circuit to finish the season, which returns to SRO competition. Circuit Ricardo Tormo has also been dropped, but the championship returned to Circuit de Spa-Francorchamps, Misano World Circuit and Circuit Zandvoort.

== Series news ==
- 2026 introduced a new Silver class and permit Gold and Platinum-rated drivers to compete in the series for the first time. Additionally, the Am class has been renamed to the Masters class.
- The series was also incorporated into the SRO GT Academy program, where the fastest Silver-rated driver racing a Maserati MC20 GT2 or a Mercedes-AMG GT2 would be awarded a full season GT World Challenge Europe drive in a Mercedes-AMG GT3. Later it was announced that Ginetta would also join the initiative with their Ginetta G56 GT2.
- In November 2025, the GT2 European Series announced that the Nürburgring would no longer host a round in the 2026 championship, reducing the number of rounds from six to five.
- Ligier Automotive also announced that it would seek to enter the GT2 European Series with its new JS2 RS. In the announcement, they confirmed that their entry would support the SRO GT Academy initiative.

== Entries ==
Entrant	Car	Engine	No.	Class	Drivers	Rounds
(Italy) LP Racing	Maserati MC20 GT2	Maserati Nettuno 3.0 L Turbo V6	1	M	(Monaco) Philippe Prette	1–4
(Italy) LP Racing	Maserati MC20 GT2	Maserati Nettuno 3.0 L Turbo V6	1	PA	(Monaco) Louis Prette	5
(Italy) LP Racing	Maserati MC20 GT2	Maserati Nettuno 3.0 L Turbo V6	1	PA	(Monaco) Philippe Prette	5
(Italy) LP Racing	Maserati MC20 GT2	Maserati Nettuno 3.0 L Turbo V6	8	PA	(United States) Thomas Yu Lee	1–4
(Italy) LP Racing	Maserati MC20 GT2	Maserati Nettuno 3.0 L Turbo V6	8	PA	(Italy) Niccoló Pirri	1–4
(Italy) LP Racing	Maserati MC20 GT2	Maserati Nettuno 3.0 L Turbo V6	8	M	(United States) Thomas Yu Lee	5
(Italy) LP Racing	Maserati MC20 GT2	Maserati Nettuno 3.0 L Turbo V6	18	S	(Slovakia) Štefan Rosina	1, 5
(Italy) LP Racing	Maserati MC20 GT2	Maserati Nettuno 3.0 L Turbo V6	18	S	(Austria) Gerhard Tweraser	1
(Italy) LP Racing	Maserati MC20 GT2	Maserati Nettuno 3.0 L Turbo V6	18	S	(Italy) Niccoló Pirri	5
(Italy) LP Racing	Maserati MC20 GT2	Maserati Nettuno 3.0 L Turbo V6	18	M	(France) Célia Martin	3
(Italy) LP Racing	Maserati MC20 GT2	Maserati Nettuno 3.0 L Turbo V6	18	M	(Italy) Luca Pirri	3
(Italy) LP Racing	Audi R8 LMS GT2	Audi DAR 5.2 L V10	88	M	(France) Stéphane Ratel	1
(Italy) LP Racing	Audi R8 LMS GT2	Audi DAR 5.2 L V10	88	S	(Slovakia) Stefan Rosina	2–4
(Italy) LP Racing	Audi R8 LMS GT2	Audi DAR 5.2 L V10	88	S	(Italy) Lorenzo Marcucci	3–4
(Italy) LP Racing	Audi R8 LMS GT2	Audi DAR 5.2 L V10	88	S	(Monaco) Louis Prette	2
(France) CMR	Ginetta G56 GT2	Ginetta LS3 6.2 L V8	3	S	(France) Ethan Gialdini	All
(France) CMR	Ginetta G56 GT2	Ginetta LS3 6.2 L V8	3	S	(Denmark) Mikkel Njor	All
(France) CMR	Ginetta G56 GT2	Ginetta LS3 6.2 L V8	62	PA	(United Kingdom) Mike Simpson	All
(France) CMR	Ginetta G56 GT2	Ginetta LS3 6.2 L V8	62	PA	(United Kingdom) Lawrence Tomlinson	All
(France) CMR	Lamborghini Huracán Super Trofeo Evo2	Lamborghini DGF 5.2 L V10	27	M	(France) Alexis Berthet	1–3
(France) CMR	Lamborghini Huracán Super Trofeo Evo2	Lamborghini DGF 5.2 L V10	27	M	(France) Vincent Iogna	1, 3
(France) CMR	Lamborghini Huracán Super Trofeo Evo2	Lamborghini DGF 5.2 L V10	27	M	(Belgium) Rodrigue Gillion	2
(France) CMR	Lamborghini Huracán Super Trofeo Evo2	Lamborghini DGF 5.2 L V10	27	PA	(France) Alexis Berthet	5
(France) CMR	Lamborghini Huracán Super Trofeo Evo2	Lamborghini DGF 5.2 L V10	27	PA	(United Kingdom) Georgi Dimitrov	5
(France) CMR	Ferrari 296 Challenge	Ferrari F163 3.0 L Turbo V6	73	M	(France) Patrick Michellier	1–4
(Belgium) i4Race	Maserati MC20 GT2	Maserati Nettuno 3.0 L Turbo V6	6	S	(Belgium) Antoine Potty	1–3, 5
(Italy) Dinamic Motorsport	Maserati MC20 GT2	Maserati Nettuno 3.0 L Turbo V6	7	PA	(Switzerland) Mauro Calamia	1, 3–5
(Italy) Dinamic Motorsport	Maserati MC20 GT2	Maserati Nettuno 3.0 L Turbo V6	7	PA	(Italy) Roberto Pampanini	1, 3–5
(Italy) SP Racing Team	Porsche 992 GT3 Cup (992.1)	Porsche 4.0 L Flat-6	55	PA	(Italy) Eugenio Pisani	1
(Italy) SP Racing Team	Porsche 992 GT3 Cup (992.1)	Porsche 4.0 L Flat-6	55	PA	(Italy) Stefano Zerbi	1
(Italy) Iron Dames by SP Racing	Porsche 992 GT3 Cup (992.1)	Porsche 4.0 L Flat-6	85	PA	(Belgium) Sarah Bovy	1, 3
(Italy) Iron Dames by SP Racing	Porsche 992 GT3 Cup (992.1)	Porsche 4.0 L Flat-6	85	PA	(Netherlands) Laura van den Hengel	1, 3
(Italy) Iron Dames by SP Racing	Maserati MC20 GT2	Maserati Nettuno 3.0 L Turbo V6	85	PA	(Belgium) Sarah Bovy	2, 4–5
(Italy) Iron Dames by SP Racing	Maserati MC20 GT2	Maserati Nettuno 3.0 L Turbo V6	85	PA	(Netherlands) Laura van den Hengel	2, 4–5
(Austria) Razoon – more than racing	KTM X-Bow GT2	Audi DNWA 2.5 L Turbo I5	10	M	(Turkey) Önder Erdem	1
(Austria) Razoon – more than racing	KTM X-Bow GT2	Audi DNWA 2.5 L Turbo I5	10	M	(Austria) Dominik Olbert	1
(Austria) Razoon – more than racing	KTM X-Bow GT2	Audi DNWA 2.5 L Turbo I5	10	PA	(Denmark) Thomas Andersen	2–3
(Austria) Razoon – more than racing	KTM X-Bow GT2	Audi DNWA 2.5 L Turbo I5	10	PA	(Denmark) Simon Birch	2
(Georgia (country)) ART-Line	Lamborghini Huracán Super Trofeo Evo2	Lamborghini DGF 5.2 L V10	12	M	(Georgia (country)) Shota Abkhazava	2
(Germany) AKF Motorsport	Lamborghini Huracán Super Trofeo Evo2	Lamborghini DGF 5.2 L V10	24	M	(Germany) Oliver Freymuth	1–4
(Denmark) High Class Racing	Ligier JS2 RS	Ford EcoBoost 3.5 L Turbo V6	77	PA	(Denmark) Anders Fjordbach	5
(Denmark) High Class Racing	Ligier JS2 RS	Ford EcoBoost 3.5 L Turbo V6	77	PA	(Iceland) Auðunn Guðmundsson	5
(Czech Republic) RTR Projects	KTM X-Bow GT2	Audi DNWA 2.5 L Turbo I5	89	M	(Slovakia) Viktor Mráz	All
(Czech Republic) RTR Projects	KTM X-Bow GT2	Audi DNWA 2.5 L Turbo I5	89	M	(Germany) Lennart Marioneck	2, 4–5
(Czech Republic) RTR Projects	KTM X-Bow GT2	Audi DNWA 2.5 L Turbo I5	89	M	(Georgia (country)) Davit Kajaia	1, 3
(Czech Republic) RTR Projects	Mercedes-AMG GT2	Mercedes-AMG M178 4.0 L Turbo V8	294	M	(Czech Republic) Petr Lisa	All
(Czech Republic) RTR Projects	Mercedes-AMG GT2	Mercedes-AMG M178 4.0 L Turbo V8	294	M	(Czech Republic) Ondřej Rokos	All
(Germany) SR Motorsport by Schnitzelalm	Mercedes-AMG GT2	Mercedes-AMG M178 4.0 L Turbo V8	110	PA	(Germany) Wilhelm Kühne	All
(Germany) SR Motorsport by Schnitzelalm	Mercedes-AMG GT2	Mercedes-AMG M178 4.0 L Turbo V8	110	PA	(Germany) Moritz Wiskirchen	All
(Germany) SR Motorsport by Schnitzelalm	Mercedes-AMG GT2	Mercedes-AMG M178 4.0 L Turbo V8	111	PA	(Germany) Jay Mo Härtling	All
(Germany) SR Motorsport by Schnitzelalm	Mercedes-AMG GT2	Mercedes-AMG M178 4.0 L Turbo V8	111	PA	(United States) David Thilenius	All
(Spain) NM Racing Team	Mercedes-AMG GT2	Mercedes-AMG M178 4.0 L Turbo V8	115	PA	(Spain) Alberto De Martin	All
(Spain) NM Racing Team	Mercedes-AMG GT2	Mercedes-AMG M178 4.0 L Turbo V8	115	PA	(Spain) Nil Montserrat	All
(Spain) NM Racing Team	Mercedes-AMG GT2	Mercedes-AMG M178 4.0 L Turbo V8	116	S	(Spain) Adrián Ferrer	1–3
(Spain) NM Racing Team	Mercedes-AMG GT2	Mercedes-AMG M178 4.0 L Turbo V8	116	S	(United Kingdom) Branden Oxley	1–2
(Spain) NM Racing Team	Mercedes-AMG GT2	Mercedes-AMG M178 4.0 L Turbo V8	116	S	(Netherlands) Bas Visser	3
(Austria) MZR Motorsportzentrum Ried	KTM X-Bow GT2	Audi DNWA 2.5 L Turbo I5	119	PA	(Austria) Marius Aigner	All
(Austria) MZR Motorsportzentrum Ried	KTM X-Bow GT2	Audi DNWA 2.5 L Turbo I5	119	PA	(Austria) Reinhard Kofler	All
(Austria) MZR Motorsportzentrum Ried	KTM X-Bow GT2	Audi DNWA 2.5 L Turbo I5	898	M	(Austria) "Max Grip"	All
(Austria) MZR Motorsportzentrum Ried	KTM X-Bow GT2	Audi DNWA 2.5 L Turbo I5	898	M	(Austria) Jack Russel	All

Icon	Class
S	Silver Cup
PA	Pro-Am Cup
M	Masters Cup
	GT Academy Entrant

== Results and standings ==
=== Race results ===
Bold indicates overall winner

Round		Circuit	Pole position	Silver Winners	Pro-Am Winners	Masters Winners	Reports
1	R1	(Italy) Monza	(Spain) No. 116 NM Racing Team	**(Belgium) No. 6 i4Race**	(Germany) No. 111 SR Motorsport by Schnitzelalm	(Italy) No. 1 LP Racing	Report
1	R1	(Italy) Monza	(Spain) Adrián Ferrer **(United Kingdom) Branden Oxley**	**(Belgium) Antoine Potty**	(Germany) Jay Mo Härtling (United States) David Thilenius	(Monaco) Philippe Prette	Report
1	R2	(Italy) Monza	(Germany) No. 111 SR Motorsport by Schnitzelalm	(France) No. 3 CMR	**(Germany) No. 111 SR Motorsport by Schnitzelalm**	(Italy) No. 1 LP Racing	Report
1	R2	(Italy) Monza	**(Germany) Jay Mo Härtling** (United States) David Thilenius	(France) Ethan Gialdini (Denmark) Mikkel Njor	**(Germany) Jay Mo Härtling** **(United States) David Thilenius**	(Monaco) Philippe Prette	Report
2	R1	(Belgium) Spa	(France) No. 3 CMR	**(France) No. 3 CMR**	(France) No. 62 CMR	(Georgia (country)) No. 12 ART-Line	Report
2	R1	(Belgium) Spa	**(France) Ethan Gialdini** (Denmark) Mikkel Njor	**(France) Ethan Gialdini** **(Denmark) Mikkel Njor**	(United Kingdom) Mike Simpson (United Kingdom) Lawrence Tomlinson	(Georgia (country)) Shota Abkhazava	Report
2	R2	(Belgium) Spa	(France) No. 62 CMR	(Belgium) No. 6 i4Race	**(Austria) No. 10 Razoon – more than racing**	(Czech Republic) No. 89 RTR Projects	Report
2	R2	(Belgium) Spa	**(United Kingdom) Mike Simpson** (United Kingdom) Lawrence Tomlinson	(Belgium) Antoine Potty	**(Denmark) Thomas Andersen** **(Denmark) Simon Birch**	(Germany) Lennart Marioneck (Slovakia) Viktor Mráz	Report
3	R1	(Italy) Misano	(Belgium) No. 6 i4Race	(Italy) No. 88 LP Racing	**(Austria) No. 119 MZR Motorsportzentrum Ried**	(Italy) No. 1 LP Racing	Report
3	R1	(Italy) Misano	**(Belgium) Antoine Potty**	(Italy) Lorenzo Marcucci (Slovakia) Štefan Rosina	**(Austria) Marius Aigner** **(Austria) Reinhard Kofler**	(Monaco) Philippe Prette	Report
3	R2	(Italy) Misano	(Germany) No. 111 SR Motorsport by Schnitzelalm	**(France) No. 3 CMR**	(Germany) No. 111 SR Motorsport by Schnitzelalm	(Czech Republic) No. 89 RTR Projects	Report
3	R2	(Italy) Misano	**(Germany) Jay Mo Härtling** (United States) David Thilenius	**(France) Ethan Gialdini** **(Denmark) Mikkel Njor**	(Germany) Jay Mo Härtling (United States) David Thilenius	(Georgia (country)) Davit Kajaia (Slovakia) Viktor Mráz	Report
4	R1	(Netherlands) Zandvoort	(France) No. 3 CMR	**(France) No. 3 CMR**	(France) No. 62 CMR	(Italy) No. 1 LP Racing	Report
4	R1	(Netherlands) Zandvoort	**(France) Ethan Gialdini** (Denmark) Mikkel Njor	**(France) Ethan Gialdini** **(Denmark) Mikkel Njor**	(United Kingdom) Mike Simpson (United Kingdom) Lawrence Tomlinson	(Monaco) Philippe Prette	Report
4	R2	(Netherlands) Zandvoort	(Austria) No. 119 MZR Motorsportzentrum Ried	**(France) No. 3 CMR**	(Austria) No. 119 MZR Motorsportzentrum Ried	(Italy) No. 1 LP Racing	Report
4	R2	(Netherlands) Zandvoort	(Austria) Marius Aigner **(Austria) Reinhard Kofler**	**(France) Ethan Gialdini** **(Denmark) Mikkel Njor**	(Austria) Marius Aigner (Austria) Reinhard Kofler	(Monaco) Philippe Prette	Report
5	R1	(Portugal) Portimão	(Belgium) No. 6 i4Race	(Belgium) No. 6 i4Race	**(Germany) No. 110 SR Motorsport by Schnitzelalm**	(Czech Republic) No. 89 RTR Projects	Report
5	R1	(Portugal) Portimão	**(Belgium) Antoine Potty**	(Belgium) Antoine Potty	**(Germany) Wilhelm Kühne** **(Germany) Moritz Wiskirchen**	(Germany) Lennart Marioneck (Slovakia) Viktor Mráz	Report
5	R2	(Portugal) Portimão	(Italy) No. 1 LP Racing	(Italy) No. 18 LP Racing	**(Italy) No. 1 LP Racing**	(Italy) No. 8 LP Racing	Report
5	R2	(Portugal) Portimão	(Monaco) Philippe Prette **(Monaco) Louis Prette**	(Italy) Niccoló Pirri (Slovakia) Štefan Rosina	**(Monaco) Philippe Prette** **(Monaco) Louis Prette**	(United States) Thomas Yu Lee	Report

=== Scoring system ===
Championship points are awarded for the first ten positions in each race. Entries are required to complete 75% of the winning car's race distance in order to be classified and earn points.

Position	**1st**	**2nd**	**3rd**	**4th**	**5th**	**6th**	**7th**	**8th**	**9th**	**10th**	**Pole**
Points	25	18	15	12	10	8	6	4	2	1	1

=== Drivers' championships ===
==== Silver Cup ====
Pos.	Driver	Team	MON (Italy)		SPA (Belgium)		MIS (Italy)		ZAN (Netherlands)		POR (Portugal)		Points
1	(France) Ethan Gialdini (Denmark) Mikkel Njor	(France) CMR	4	1	1**^{P}**	3**^{P}**	Ret	1	1**^{P}**	1**^{P}**	3	2	189
2	(Slovakia) Štefan Rosina	(Italy) LP Racing	2	Ret	Ret	WD	1	2	2	2	2	1	140
3	(Belgium) Antoine Potty	(Belgium) i4Race	1	Ret	2	1	Ret**^{P}**	WD**^{P}**			1**^{P}**	3**^{P}**	112
4	(Spain) Adrián Ferrer	(Spain) NM Racing Team	3**^{P}**	2**^{P}**	3	2	Ret	3					83
5	(Italy) Lorenzo Marcucci	(Italy) LP Racing					1	2	2	2			79
6	(United Kingdom) Branden Oxley	(Spain) NM Racing Team	3**^{P}**	2**^{P}**	3	2							68
7	(Austria) Gerhard Tweraser	(Italy) LP Racing	2	Ret									18
8	(Netherlands) Bas Visser	(Spain) NM Racing Team					Ret	3					15
–	(Monaco) Louis Prette	(Italy) LP Racing			Ret	WD							0
Guest drivers ineligible to score points
–	(Italy) Niccoló Pirri	(Italy) LP Racing									2	1	0
Pos.	Driver	Team	MON (Italy)		SPA (Belgium)		MIS (Italy)		ZAN (Netherlands)		POR (Portugal)		Points

Colour	Result
Gold	Winner
Silver	Second place
Bronze	Third place
Green	Points classification
Blue	Non-points classification
Blue	Non-classified finish (NC)
Purple	Retired, not classified (Ret)
Red	Did not qualify (DNQ)
Red	Did not pre-qualify (DNPQ)
Black	Disqualified (DSQ)
White	Did not start (DNS)
White	Withdrew (WD)
White	Race cancelled (C)
Blank	Did not practice (DNP)
Blank	Did not arrive (DNA)
Blank	Excluded (EX)

- **^{P}** - Pole position

==== Pro-Am Cup ====
Pos.	Driver	Team	MON (Italy)		SPA (Belgium)		MIS (Italy)		ZAN (Netherlands)		POR (Portugal)		Points
1	(Germany) Jay Mo Härtling (United States) David Thilenius	(Germany) SR Motorsport by Schnitzelalm	1	1**^{P}**	2	5	6	1**^{P}**	3	5	5	6	160
2	(United Kingdom) Mike Simpson (United Kingdom) Lawrence Tomlinson	(France) CMR	4	5	1**^{P}**	4**^{P}**	4	3	1**^{P}**	3	Ret	5	141
3	(Austria) Marius Aigner (Austria) Reinhard Kofler	(Austria) MZR Motorsportzentrum Ried	5	6	7	3	1	5	5	1**^{P}**	7	9	124
4	(Spain) Alberto De Martin (Spain) Nil Montserrat	(Spain) NM Racing Team	2	2	6	2	7	7	4	6	4	5	124
5	(Switzerland) Mauro Calamia (Italy) Roberto Pampanini	(Italy) Dinamic Motorsport	3	3			8	2	6	2	6	3	113
6	(Germany) Wilhelm Kühne (Germany) Moritz Wiskirchen	(Germany) SR Motorsport by Schnitzelalm	Ret	9	3	6	2	6	7	7	1	4	106
7	(Belgium) Sarah Bovy (Netherlands) Laura van den Hengel	(Italy) Iron Dames by SP Racing	6	7	5	7	5	4	DNS	Ret	3	8	78
8	(United States) Thomas Yu Lee (Italy) Niccoló Pirri	(Italy) LP Racing	8**^{P}**	4	8	Ret	3**^{P}**	Ret	2	4			67
9	(Denmark) Thomas Andersen (Denmark) Simon Birch	(Austria) Razoon – more than racing			4	1							37
10	(Italy) Eugenio Pisani (Italy) Stefano Zerbi	(Italy) SP Racing Team	7	8									10
11	(Monaco) Louis Prette (Monaco) Philippe Prette	(Italy) LP Racing									2	1**^{P}**	1
11	(Denmark) Anders Fjordbach (Iceland) Auðunn Guðmundsson	(Denmark) High Class Racing									WD**^{P}**	WD	1
Guest drivers ineligible to score points
–	(France) Alexis Berthet (United Kingdom) Georgi Dimitrov	(France) CMR									Ret	2	0
Pos.	Driver	Team	MON (Italy)		SPA (Belgium)		MIS (Italy)		ZAN (Netherlands)		POR (Portugal)		Points

==== Masters Cup ====
Pos.	Driver	Team	MON (Italy)		SPA (Belgium)		MIS (Italy)		ZAN (Netherlands)		POR (Portugal)		Points
1	(Monaco) Philippe Prette	(Italy) LP Racing	1	1	2	2	1	7**^{P}**	1**^{P}**	1**^{P}**			170
2	(Slovakia) Viktor Mráz	(Czech Republic) RTR Projects	5	6	6	1**^{P}**	DNS**^{P}**	1	2	2	1**^{P}**	2**^{P}**	166
3	(Czech Republic) Petr Lisa (Czech Republic) Ondřej Rokos	(Czech Republic) RTR Projects	2**^{P}**	2**^{P}**	Ret	7	2	4	3	4	3	3	137
4	(Germany) Lennart Marioneck	(Czech Republic) RTR Projects			6	1**^{P}**			2	2	1**^{P}**	2**^{P}**	122
5	(Austria) "Max Grip" (Austria) Jack Russel	(Austria) MZR Motorsportzentrum Ried	Ret	3	5	6	3	3	4	3	4	4	120
6	(Germany) Oliver Freymuth	(Germany) AKF Motorsport	4	5	3	4	Ret	6	6	5			75
7	(France) Patrick Michellier	(France) CMR	Ret	WD	7	8	4	5	5	6			50
8	(France) Alexis Berthet	(France) CMR	3	7	4	3	Ret	Ret					48
9	(Georgia (country)) Davit Kajaia	(Czech Republic) RTR Projects	5	6			DNS**^{P}**	1					44
10	(Georgia (country)) Shota Abkhazava	(Georgia (country)) ART-Line			1**^{P}**	5							36
11	(Belgium) Rodrigue Gillion	(France) CMR			4	3							27
12	(France) Vincent Iogna	(France) CMR	3	7			Ret	Ret					21
13	(France) Stéphane Ratel	(Italy) LP Racing	6	4									20
14	(France) Célia Martin (Italy) Luca Pirri	(France) CMR					DSQ	2					18
15	(Turkey) Önder Erdem (Austria) Dominik Olbert	(Austria) Razoon – more than racing	DNS	8									4
Guest drivers ineligible to score points
–	(United States) Thomas Yu Lee	(Italy) LP Racing									2	1	0
Pos.	Driver	Team	MON (Italy)		SPA (Belgium)		MIS (Italy)		ZAN (Netherlands)		POR (Portugal)		Points

==== SRO GT Academy ====
Rather than on race results, points are awarded largely on the basis of single-driver performance, average pace and fastest laps. The winner of the class will receive a fully funded seat with a Mercedes-AMG Customer Team for the full 2027 GT World Challenge Europe Endurance Cup.

Pos.	Driver	Team	Points
1	(Germany) Jay Mo Härtling	(Germany) SR Motorsport by Schnitzelalm	234
2	(France) Ethan Gialdini	(France) CMR	152
3	(Germany) Moritz Wiskirchen	(Germany) SR Motorsport by Schnitzelalm	143
4	(Belgium) Antoine Potty	(Belgium) i4Race	138
5	(Denmark) Mikkel Njor	(France) CMR	123
6	(Italy) Niccoló Pirri	(Italy) LP Racing	90
7	(Spain) Adrián Ferrer	(Spain) NM Racing Team	56
8	(United Kingdom) Branden Oxley	(Spain) NM Racing Team	49

=== Teams' championships ===
==== Silver Cup ====
Pos.	Team	MON (Italy)		SPA (Belgium)		MIS (Italy)		ZAN (Netherlands)		POR (Portugal)		Points
1	(France) CMR	4	1	1**^{P}**	3**^{P}**	Ret	1	1**^{P}**	1**^{P}**	3	2	189
2	(Italy) LP Racing	2	Ret	Ret	WD	1	2	2	2	2	1	140
3	(Belgium) i4Race	1	Ret	2	1	Ret**^{P}**	WD**^{P}**			1**^{P}**	3**^{P}**	112
4	(Spain) NM Racing Team	3**^{P}**	2**^{P}**	3	2	Ret	3					83
Pos.	Team	MON (Italy)		SPA (Belgium)		MIS (Italy)		ZAN (Netherlands)		POR (Portugal)		Points

==== Pro-Am Cup ====
Pos.	Team	MON (Italy)		SPA (Belgium)		MIS (Italy)		ZAN (Netherlands)		POR (Portugal)		Points
1	(Germany) SR Motorsport by Schnitzelalm	1	1**^{P}**	2	5	2	1**^{P}**	3	5	1	4	185
2	(France) CMR	4	5	1**^{P}**	4**^{P}**	4	3	1**^{P}**	3	Ret	2	147
3	(Austria) MZR Motorsportzentrum Ried	5	6	6	3	1	5	5	1**^{P}**	6	7	126
4	(Spain) NM Racing Team	2	2	5	2	7	7	4	6	4	5	122
5	(Italy) LP Racing	8**^{P}**	4	7	Ret	3**^{P}**	Ret	2	4	2	1**^{P}**	115
6	(Italy) Dinamic Motorsport	3	3			8	2	6	2	5	3	105
7	(Italy) SP Racing Team	6	7	4	6	5	4	DNS	Ret	3	6	79
8	(Austria) Razoon – more than racing			3	1							40
9	(Denmark) High Class Racing									WD**^{P}**	WD	1
Pos.	Team	MON (Italy)		SPA (Belgium)		MIS (Italy)		ZAN (Netherlands)		POR (Portugal)		Points

==== Masters Cup ====
Pos.	Team	MON (Italy)		SPA (Belgium)		MIS (Italy)		ZAN (Netherlands)		POR (Portugal)		Points
1	(Czech Republic) RTR Projects	2**^{P}**	2**^{P}**	6	1**^{P}**	2**^{P}**	1	2	2	1**^{P}**	2**^{P}**	204
2	(Italy) LP Racing	1	1	2	2	1	2**^{P}**	1**^{P}**	1**^{P}**	2	1	182
3	(Austria) MZR Motorsportzentrum Ried	Ret	3	5	6	3	3	3	3	3	3	129
4	(France) CMR	3	7	4	3	4	5	5	6			98
5	(Germany) AFK Motorsport	4	5	3	4	Ret	6	6	5			83
6	(Georgia (country)) ART-Line			1**^{P}**	5							36
7	(Austria) Razoon – more than racing	DNS	8									8
Pos.	Team	MON (Italy)		SPA (Belgium)		MIS (Italy)		ZAN (Netherlands)		POR (Portugal)		Points

Notes:

- † – Entry did not finish the race but was classified, as it completed more than 75% of the race distance.
