= Laura van den Hengel =

Dutch racing driver (born 1991)

- Nationality: (Netherlands) Dutch
- Born: 27 February 1991 (age 35) Achterveld, Utrecht, Netherlands
- Categorisation: FIA Bronze

Championship titles
- 2025: GT Cup Open Europe – Pro-Am

Laura van den Hengel (born 27 February 1991 in Achterveld) is a Dutch racing driver.

== Career ==
Van den Hengel started karting in 2010. Competing for TR Motorsport in 2011, van den Hengel won the Dutch Karting Championship in the O18 class and raced with them until 2013. Returning to karts in 2018 after a five-year hiatus, van den Hengel raced in karts until 2021, competing for CRG Holland in the KZ2 and KZ class of the German and Dutch Karting Championships, respectively.

After a move to the GT Cup Championship fell through in 2022, van den Hengel tested a Mazda MX-5 Cup car at Assen, ahead of the final round of the MX-5 Nederland championship. Half a year later, van den Hengel made her car racing debut in GT Cup Open Europe, joining Ghinzani Arco Motorsport alongside Maurizio Fondi in the Am class. Racing in the Paul Ricard and Monza rounds, van den Hengel finished ninth in class in race two at Paul Ricard, and eighth in class at Monza in both races.

In 2024, van den Hengel returned to GT Cup Open Europe, joining Mertel Motorsport alongside Alba Vázquez. After finishing in the top 10 in class in the opening round of the season at Algarve, van den Hengel scored her first top five of the season at Spa in race two with a fifth-place finish. At the penultimate round of the season at Barcelona, van den Hengel scored her best class result, finishing fourth in race two. van den Hengel was joined by Tommaso Lovati for the season finale at Monza. In the two season-ending races, van den Hengel suffered a puncture in race one and finished outside of the top 20, while in race two she retired due to a mechanical issue. During 2024, van den Hengel made a one-off appearance in the 2024 Italian GT Cup Sprint Championship for SP Racing at Mugello alongside Ian Rodríguez. Starting from class pole in race one, van den Hengel finished second in the Pro-Am class on her series debut.

In early 2025, van den Hengel became the one of three drivers to be part of Iron Dames' "Supported by Iron Dames" programme. One month later it was announced that van den Hengel would return to GT Cup Open Europe, driving for Burgers motorsport by HWM alongside Paul Meijer. In her second full-time season in GT Cup Europe, Van den Hengel began the year with a win at Algarve, before taking a double win at Spa and Le Castellet, and taking further wins at Barcelona and Monza to seal the Pro-Am title. Ahead of the GT Cup Open Europe season, van den Hengel competed in the 12 Hours of Mugello for Proton Huber Competition in GT3 Pro-Am. In her first race in GT3 machinery, van den Hengel finished fifth in class and 13th in GT3.

The following year, van den Hengel teamed up with Sarah Bovy to compete in the GT Cup class of the GT2 European Series for Iron Dames, in a collaboration with SP Racing. Dabbling between the Porsche 992 GT3 Cup (992.1) and the Maserati MC20 GT2, Van den Hengel took a lone podium at Algarve to end the year seventh in the Pro-Am standings.

== Karting record ==
=== Karting career summary ===
Season	Series	Team	Position
2021	International Super Cup - KZ2	Laura van den Hengel	NC

== Racing record ==
=== Racing career summary ===
Season	Series	Team	Races	Wins	Poles	F/Laps	Podiums	Points	Position
2023	GT Cup Open Europe – Am	Ghinzani Arco Motorsport	4	0	0	0	0	0	20th
2024	GT Cup Open Europe – Am	Mertel Motorsport	9	0	0	0	0	5	14th
2024	GT Cup Open Europe – Pro-Am	Mertel Motorsport	2	0	0	0	0	0	NC
2024	Italian GT Sprint Championship – GT Cup Pro-Am	SP Racing	2	0	1	0	1	16	NC
2025	24H Series – GT3 Pro-Am	Proton Huber Competition	1	0	0	0	0	24	NC
2025	GT Cup Open Europe – Pro-Am	Burgers Motorsport by Hans Weijs Motorsport	12	8	4	0	9	69	**1st**
2026	GT2 European Series – Pro-Am	Iron Dames by SP Racing	9	0	0	0	1	78	7th

=== Complete GT Cup Open Europe results ===
Year	Team	Car	Class	1	2	3	4	5	6	7	8	9	10	11	12	Pos.	Points
2023	Ghinzani Arco Motorsport	Porsche 992 GT3 Cup	Am	PRT; 1	PRT; 2	SPA	LEC; 1; 12	LEC; 2; 10	MNZ; 1; 8	MNZ; 2; 8	CAT; 1	CAT; 2				20th	0
2024	Mertel Motorsport	Ferrari 488 Challenge Evo	Am	ALG; 1; 9	ALG; 2; 7	HOC; 1; 8†	HOC; 2; 8	SPA; 1; 8	SPA; 2; 5	LEC; 1 Ret	LEC; 2 DNS	CAT; 1; 8	CAT; 2; 4			14th	5
2024	Mertel Motorsport	Ferrari 488 Challenge Evo	Pro-Am											MNZ; 1; 10	MNZ; 2 Ret	NC	0
2025	Burgers Motorsport by Hans Weijs Motorsport	Porsche 992 GT3 Cup	Pro-Am	PRT; 1; 1	PRT; 2 Ret	SPA; 1; 1	SPA; 2; 1	HOC; 1 Ret	HOC; 2; 2	LEC; 1; 1	LEC; 2; 1	CAT; 1; 4	CAT; 2; 1	MNZ; 1; 4	MNZ; 2; 3	1st	69

=== Complete GT2 European Series results ===
(key) (Races in bold indicate pole position) (Races in italics indicate fastest lap)

Year	Team	Car	Class	1	2	3	4	5	6	7	8	9	10	Pos	Points
2026	Iron Dames by SP Racing	Porsche 992 GT3 Cup (992.1)	Pro-Am	MNZ; 1; 6	MNZ; 2; 7			MIS; 1; 5	MIS; 2; 4					7th	78
2026	Iron Dames by SP Racing	Maserati MC20 GT2	Pro-Am			SPA; 1; 5	SPA; 2; 7			ZAN; 1 DNS	ZAN; 2 Ret	ALG; 1; 3	ALG; 2; 8	7th	78
