= Maserati Grecale =

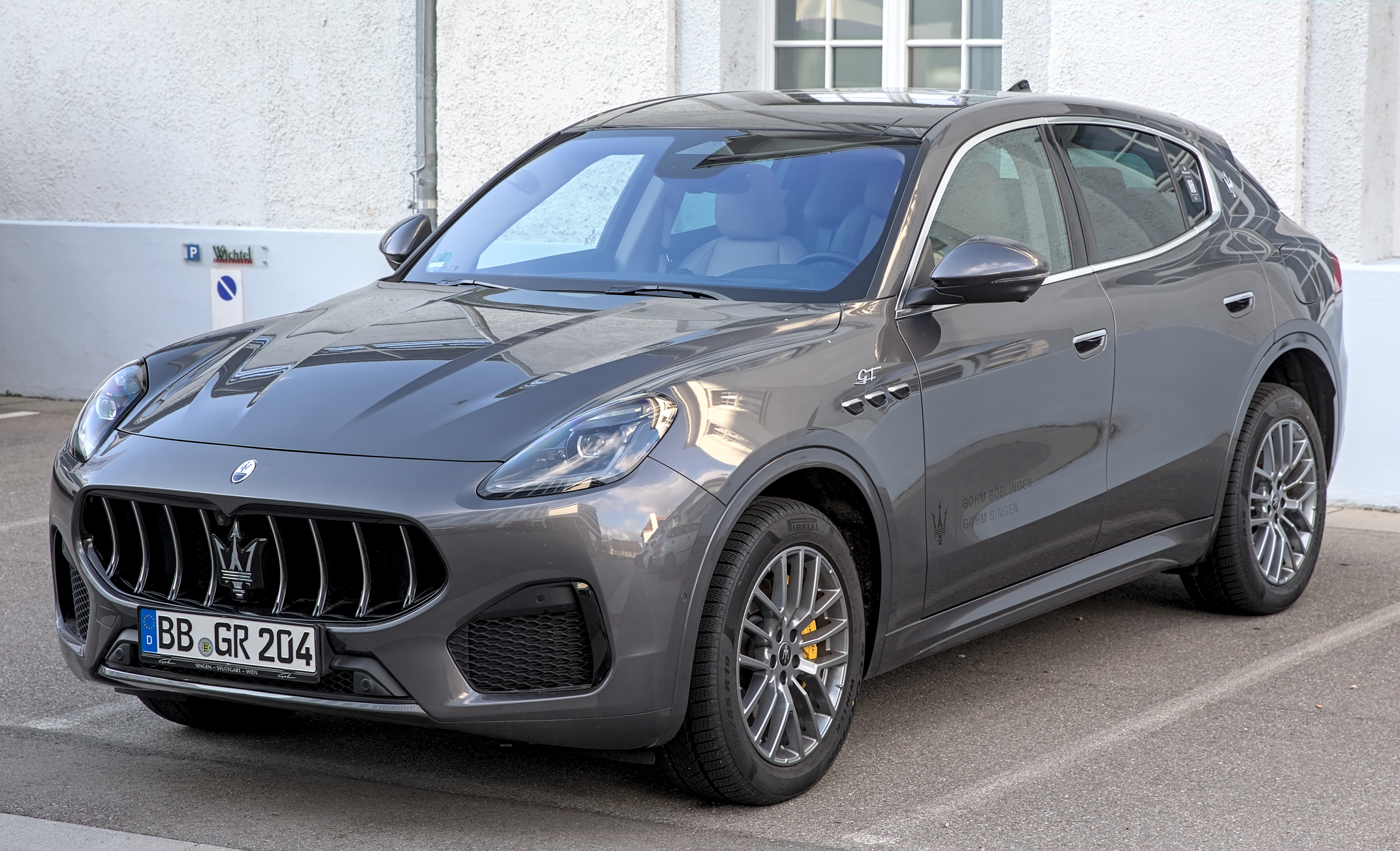
- Maserati Grecale GT

Overview
- Manufacturer: Maserati
- Model code: Tipo M182
- Production: March 2022 – present
- Model years: 2023–present
- Assembly: Italy: Piedimonte San Germano, Lazio (Cassino Plant)
- Designer: Klaus Busse at Centro Stile Maserati

Body and chassis
- Class: Compact luxury crossover SUV (D)
- Body style: 5-door SUV
- Layout: Front-engine, four-wheel-drive; Dual-motor, four-wheel-drive (Folgore)
- Platform: FCA Giorgio
- Related: Alfa Romeo Stelvio

Powertrain
- Engine: Petrol: 2.0 L GME T4 Multiair turbo I4 (mild hybrid); 3.0 L Nettuno twin-turbocharged V6
- Electric motor: Permanent magnet synchronous motor (Folgore)
- Transmission: 8-speed ZF 8HP automatic
- Battery: 105 kWh, 400V lithium ion (Folgore)

Dimensions
- Wheelbase: 2,901 mm (114.2 in)
- Length: 4,846 mm (190.8 in)
- Width: 1,948 mm (76.7 in)
- Height: 1,670 mm (65.7 in)
- Kerb weight: 1,870 kg (4,123 lb)

The Maserati Grecale (Tipo M182) is a front-engine, five-door, five passenger compact luxury crossover SUV (D-segment) manufactured and marketed by the Maserati subdivision of Stellantis, entering production at the company's Cassino Plant in March 2022. Internally designated model M182, the Grecale shares the company's Giorgio platform with the Alfa Romeo Stelvio and the fifth generation Jeep Grand Cherokee.

The nameplate Grecale derives from the Mediterranean wind, Gregale.

A notable safety issue is the car stopping dead while driving in motion.

== Announcement ==
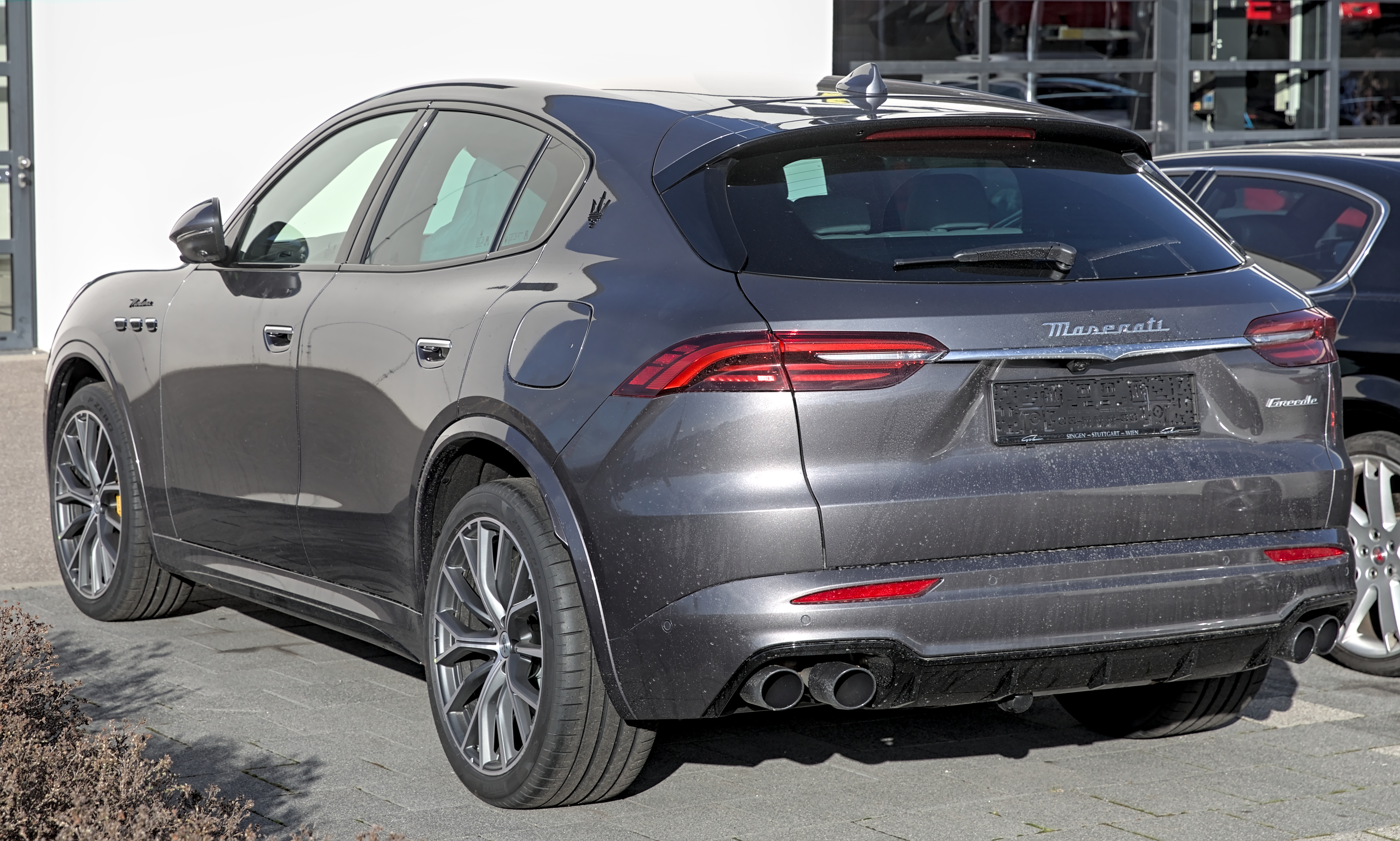
Maserati Grecale Modena

During the unveiling ceremony for the Maserati MC20 sports car in late 2020, Maserati also announced it would release an SUV below the Levante, named the Grecale. It is to be offered with options of hybrid, full electric and petrol drivetrains. The Maserati Grecale became available for purchase in North America in early 2023.

== 2026 facelift ==
On 18 June 2026, Maserati introduced a mid-cycle facelift for the Grecale for the 2027 model year. The updates introduce revisions to the exterior styling, interior technology, and variant powertrains.

2026 Maserati Grecale Modena V6

Rear view

Interior

== Powertrain ==
The Grecale is available with several mild hybrid inline-four powertrains and a 530 PS (390 kW) V6 engine for the Trofeo specification. A full electric version, called the Folgore, is available. It is equipped with a 105 kWh battery and went on sale in 2023 as a 2024 model. The Folgore features dual motors that each produce 279 PS (205 kW; 275 hp), adding up to 558 PS (410 kW; 550 hp) altogether.

Internal combustion engines
Spec Model	Engine	Power	Torque	Displacement	Top speed	Transmission	Acceleration (0-60/100)	Drive	Production
Petrol models
Modena V6*	3.0 L Nettuno twin-turbo V6	390 PS (287 kW; 385 hp)	522 N⋅m (385 lb⋅ft) at 2000-3750	2,992 cc (3.0 L; 182.6 cu in)	257 km/h (160 mph)	8-speed automatic transmission	5.0 sec	AWD	2026-
Trofeo	3.0 L Nettuno twin-turbo V6	530 PS (390 kW; 523 hp) at 6200	620 N⋅m (457 lb⋅ft) at 3000-5500	2,992 cc (3.0 L; 182.6 cu in)	285 km/h (177 mph)	8-speed automatic transmission	3.8 sec	AWD	2022–
Mild hybrid models
GT	2.0 L TBI-M T4 turbo I4	300 PS (221 kW; 296 hp) at 5750	450 N⋅m (332 lb⋅ft) at 2000-4000	1,995 cc (2.0 L; 121.7 cu in)	240 km/h (149 mph)	8-speed automatic transmission	5.6 sec	AWD	2022– (discontinued in 2026 in North America)
Modena	2.0 L TBI-M T4 turbo I4	330 PS (243 kW; 325 hp) at 5750	450 N⋅m (332 lb⋅ft) at 2000-4000	1,995 cc (2.0 L; 121.7 cu in)	240 km/h (149 mph)	8-speed automatic transmission	5.3 sec	AWD	2022– (discontinued in 2026 in North America)

* - Only available in North America.

Electric details
Spec Model	Battery	Battery capacity	Range (WLTP)	Power	Torque	0–100 km/h (0–62 mph)	Top speed	Transmission	Drive	Production
Folgore (EV)	Lithium-ion	105.0 kWh (378 MJ)	500 km (310 mi)	558 PS (410 kW; 550 hp)	820 N⋅m (605 lb⋅ft)	4.1 s	220 km/h (137 mph)	N/A	AWD	2023–
