= Simon Birch (racing driver) =

Danish racing driver (born 2007)

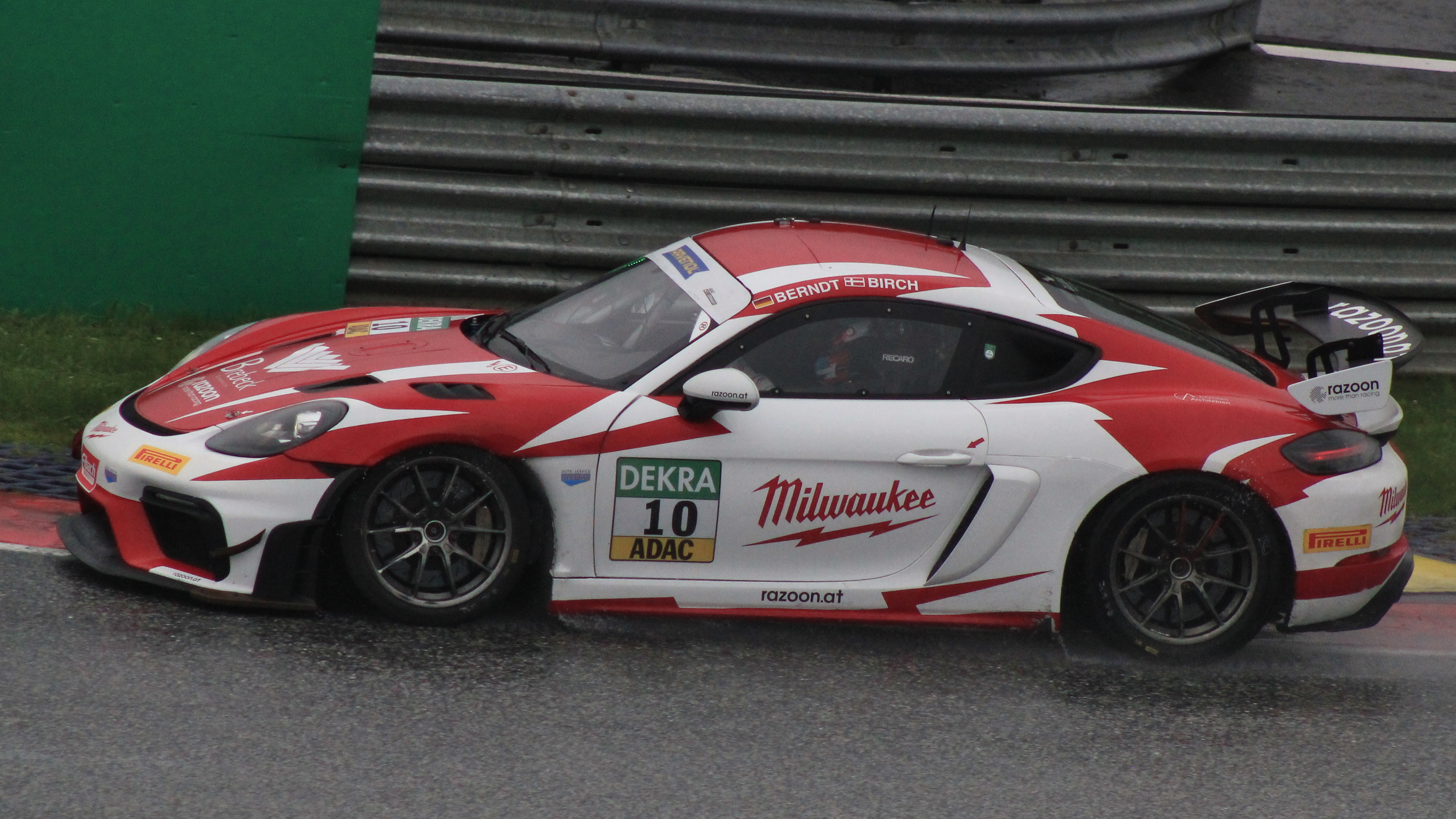
- Birch in 2024
- Nationality: (Denmark) Danish
- Born: Simon Birch Kristensen; 4 January 2007 (age 19) Ikast, Denmark
- Categorisation: FIA Silver

Championship titles
- 2022: Yokohama SuperCup Denmark

Simon Birch Kristensen (born 4 January 2007 in Ikast) is a Danish racing driver who last competed for Selected Car Racing in the GT World Challenge Europe Endurance Cup.

== Career ==
Birch started karting in 2016 and mainly competed in Rotax Max Challenge Denmark until 2021. During his time in karts, Birch most notably won the 2019 Rotax Max Challenge Denmark in the Mini class.

Stepping up to car racing in 2021, Birch competed in the Yokohama 1600 Challenge Denmark for Brian Madsen Sport. In his first season in cars, Birch won race one at the second round of the season at Padborg Park, and with a further win in the penultimate round at Jyllandsringen and seven more podiums, Birch finished runner-up in the standings to Mirel Lovic.

Birch stepped up to the Yokohama SuperCup for 2022, joining GMB Motorsport. After not scoring points in the season-opening Padborg Park round, Birch then went on to win all but two of the remaining 15 races on his way to the title, 18 points ahead of Oliver Rømer.

Returning to GMB Motorsport for 2023, Birch made his debut in Super GT Denmark and also made his GT3 debut, racing in the Le Mans Cup alongside Thomas Andersen. In Super GT, Birch won on his debut at Padborg Park and scored a further win at the third round of the season at Ring Djursland en route to fourth in points. In the latter, Birch won at Spa on track, but was given a ten-second penalty after the race for not slowing down within the required time during a VSC period and thus dropped to eighth.

In 2024, Birch was set to compete in both the GT World Challenge Europe Endurance Cup and GT World Challenge Europe Sprint Cups for GMB Motorsport, but the team folded prior to the start of the season. With the collapse of GMB Motorsport, Birch joined Razoon – More than Racing for a dual campaign in the GT2 European Series and ADAC GT4 Germany. In the former, Birch took five podiums across the season, taking a best result of second three times, on his way to third in the Pro-Am standings. In ADAC GT4 Germany, Birch won the season finale at the Hockenheimring and scored two more podiums to finish ninth in points.

Birch returned to Razoon – More than Racing for 2025, stepping up to ADAC GT Masters, whilst also returning to the GT2 European Series. In his first season in ADAC GT Masters, Birch won both races at the Lausitzring on debut, and scored three further podiums to end the year third in the overall standings. During 2025, Birch also won the 6 Hours of Portimão and the 6 Hours of Barcelona for the same team, as well as making one-off appearances in the GT World Challenge Europe Sprint Cup and the Gulf 12 Hours.

Remaining in GT3 competition for the following year, Birch joined Ferrari-linked AF Corse-run Selected Car Racing to race in the GT World Challenge Europe Endurance Cup. In his first season in Ferrari machinery, Birch scored Gold Cup wins at Monza and Algarve to secure runner-up honours in class. During 2026, Birch also competed for Razoon in select outings of the GT World Challenge Europe Sprint Cup, in which he took a best result of fourth in a guest return in the Pro class at Zandvoort with Klaus Bachler, as well as scoring a lone overall win on his return to the GT2 European Series at Spa. At the end of the year, Birch joined AMG customer team Petrolife Racing Team to race in the GT3 class of the 2026–27 Asian Le Mans Series.

== Karting record ==
=== Karting career summary ===
Season	Series	Team	Position
2019	Rotax Max Challenge Denmark – Junior		30th
2019	Rotax Max Challenge International Trophy – Mini Max	Mads R. Thomsen	4th
2019	Rotax Challenge Grand Finals – Mini Max	Mads R. Thomsen	35th
2020	Rotax Max Challenge Denmark – Junior		2nd
2020	BNL Karting Series Kick-Off – Junior Max		12th
2021	Rotax Max Challenge Denmark – Junior		11th

== Racing record ==
=== Racing career summary ===
Season	Series	Team	Races	Wins	Poles	F/Laps	Podiums	Points	Position
2021	Yokohama 1600 Challenge Denmark	Brian MaDSEN sPORT	15	2	0	1	9	294	**2nd**
2022	Yokohama SuperCup Denmark	GMB Motorsport	16	13	5	11	15	369	**1st**
2023	Danish Super GT	GMB Motorsport	18	2	1	0	4	320	4th
2023	Le Mans Cup – GT3	GMB Motorsport	7	0	0	0	0	30	9th
2024	GT2 European Series – Pro-Am	Razoon – More than Racing	12	0	0	0	5	140	**3rd**
2024	ADAC GT4 Germany	Razoon – More than Racing	12	1	0	0	3	101	7th
2024	GT4 European Series – Silver	Razoon – More than Racing	2	0	0	0	0	0	NC
2024	24H Series – GTX	Razoon – More than Racing	1	0	1	1	1	54	5th
2024	Selected Car Group Super GT Danmark	ST Competition	6	0	0	0	3	109	12th
2025	Middle East Trophy – 992	Razoon – More than Racing	2	0	0	0	1	0	NC
2025	6 Hour of Portimão	Razoon – More than Racing	1	1	1	1	1	—N/a	**1st**
2025	6 Hour of Barcelona	Razoon – More than Racing	1	0	1	1	1	—N/a	**1st**
2025	GT Winter Series – GT3	Razoon – More than Racing	6	2	3	3	5	82*	4th*
2025	GT2 European Series – Pro-Am	Razoon – More than Racing	2	0	0	0	1	30	8th
2025	ADAC GT Masters	Razoon – More than Racing	12	2	1	1	4	155	**3rd**
2025	GT World Challenge Europe Sprint Cup	Razoon – More than Racing	2	0	0	0	0	0	NC
2025	Gulf 12 Hours – Pro-Am	Razoon – More than Racing	1	0	0	0	0	—N/a	5th
2025–26	24H Series Middle East – GT3	Razoon – more than racing	2	0	0	0	0	31	14th
2026	GT World Challenge Europe Endurance Cup	Selected Car Racing	5	0	0	0	0	12	21st
2026	GT World Challenge Europe Endurance Cup – Gold	Selected Car Racing	5	2	1	0	3	104	**2nd**
2026	Intercontinental GT Challenge	Selected Car Racing	1	0	0	0	0	0	NC
2026	GT World Challenge Europe Sprint Cup	Razoon – more than racing	4	0	0	0	0	0	NC
2026	GT World Challenge Europe Sprint Cup – Silver	Razoon – more than racing	2	0	0	0	0	1	15th
2026	GT2 European Series – Pro-Am	Razoon – more than racing	2	1	0	0	1	37	9th
2026	ADAC GT4 Germany	Razoon – more than racing	2	0	0	0	0	8	25th
2026–27	Asian Le Mans Series – GT3	Petrolife Racing Team							

=== Complete Le Mans Cup results ===
(key) (Races in bold indicate pole position; results in italics indicate fastest lap)

Year	Entrant	Class	Chassis	1	2	3	4	5	6	7	Rank	Points
2023	GMB Motorsport	GT3	Honda NSX GT3 Evo22	CAT; 6	LMS; 1; 16	LMS; 2; 8	LEC; 12	ARA; 4	SPA; 8	ALG; 11	9th	30

=== Complete ADAC GT4 Germany results ===
(key) (Races in bold indicate pole position) (Races in italics indicate fastest lap)

Year	Team	Car	1	2	3	4	5	6	7	8	9	10	11	12	13	DC	Points
2024	Razoon – more than racing	Porsche 718 Cayman GT4 Clubsport	OSC; 1; 10	OSC; 2; 4	LAU; 1; 16	LAU; 2; 11	NOR; 1; 18	NOR; 2; 2	NÜR; 1; 20	NÜR; 2; 8	RBR; 1; 2	RBR; 2; 12	HOC; 1 Ret	HOC; 2; 1		7th	101
2026	Razoon – more than racing	BMW M4 GT4 Evo (G82)	RBR; 1	RBR; 2	NOR; 1; 12	NOR; 2; 12	OSC; 1	OSC; 2	NÜR; 1	NÜR; 2	SAC; 1	SAC; 2	HOC; 1	HOC; 2	HOC; 3	25th	8

=== Complete GT2 European Series results ===
(key) (Races in bold indicate pole position) (Races in italics indicate fastest lap)

Year	Team	Car	Class	1	2	3	4	5	6	7	8	9	10	11	12	Pos	Points
2024	Razoon – more than racing	KTM X-Bow GT2	Pro-Am	LEC; 1; 5	LEC; 2; 3	MIS; 1; 6	MIS; 2; 3	SPA; 1; 2	SPA; 2; 2	HOC; 1; 4	HOC; 2; 2	MNZ; 1 Ret	MNZ; 2; 5	BAR; 1; 6	BAR; 2; 6	3rd	140
2025	Razoon – more than racing	KTM X-Bow GT2	Pro-Am	LEC; 1; 2	LEC; 2; 4	ZAN; 1	ZAN; 2	SPA; 1	SPA; 2	MIS; 1	MIS; 2	VAL; 1	VAL; 2	BAR; 1	BAR; 2	8th	30
2026	Razoon – more than racing	KTM X-Bow GT2	Pro-Am	MNZ; 1	MNZ; 2	SPA; 1; 4	SPA; 2; 1	MIS; 1	MIS; 2	ZAN; 1	ZAN; 2	ALG; 1	ALG; 2			9th	37

=== Complete GT4 European Series results ===
(key) (Races in bold indicate pole position) (Races in italics indicate fastest lap)

Year	Team	Car	Class	1	2	3	4	5	6	7	8	9	10	11	12	Pos	Points
2024	Razoon – more than racing	Porsche 718 Cayman GT4 Clubsport	Silver	LEC; 1	LEC; 2	MIS; 1	MIS; 2	SPA; 1	SPA; 2	HOC; 1	HOC; 2	MNZ; 1	MNZ; 2	JED; 1 Ret	JED; 2; 12	NC	0

=== Complete ADAC GT Masters results ===
(key) (Races in bold indicate pole position) (Races in italics indicate fastest lap)

Year	Team	Car	1	2	3	4	5	6	7	8	9	10	11	12	DC	Points
2025	Razoon – more than racing	Porsche 911 GT3 R (992)	LAU; 1; 1	LAU; 2; 1	ZAN; 1; 8	ZAN; 2; 10	NÜR; 1; 5	NÜR; 2; 15	SAL; 1; 4	SAL; 2; 10^{3}	RBR; 1; 7	RBR; 2; 3	**HOC**; **1**; 2^{1}	HOC; 2; 10	3rd	155

* Season in progress.

=== Complete GT World Challenge Europe results ===
==== GT World Challenge Europe Sprint Cup ====
(key) (Races in bold indicate pole position) (Races in italics indicate fastest lap)

Year	Team	Car	Class	1	2	3	4	5	6	7	8	9	10	Pos.	Points
2025	Razoon - more than racing	Porsche 911 GT3 R (992)	Pro	BRH; 1	BRH; 2	ZAN; 1	ZAN; 2	MIS; 1; 33	MIS; 2; 23	MAG; 1	MAG; 2	VAL; 1	VAL; 2	NC	0
2026	Razoon - more than racing	Porsche 911 GT3 R (992.2)	Silver	BRH; 1; 30	BRH; 2; 28	MIS; 1	MIS; 2	MAG; 1	MAG; 2					15th	1
2026	Razoon - more than racing	Porsche 911 GT3 R (992.2)	Pro							ZAN; 1; 4	ZAN; 2; 18	CAT; 1	CAT; 2	NC†	0†

==== GT World Challenge Europe Endurance Cup ====
(key) (Races in bold indicate pole position) (Races in italics indicate fastest lap)

Year	Team	Car	Class	1	2	3	4	5	6	7	Pos.	Points
2026	Selected Car Racing	Ferrari 296 GT3 Evo	Gold	LEC; 16	MNZ; 14	SPA; 6H; 16	SPA; 12H; 42	SPA; 24H; 26	NÜR; 11	**ALG**; 4	2nd	104
