= Maserati Nettuno engine =

Maserati Nettuno
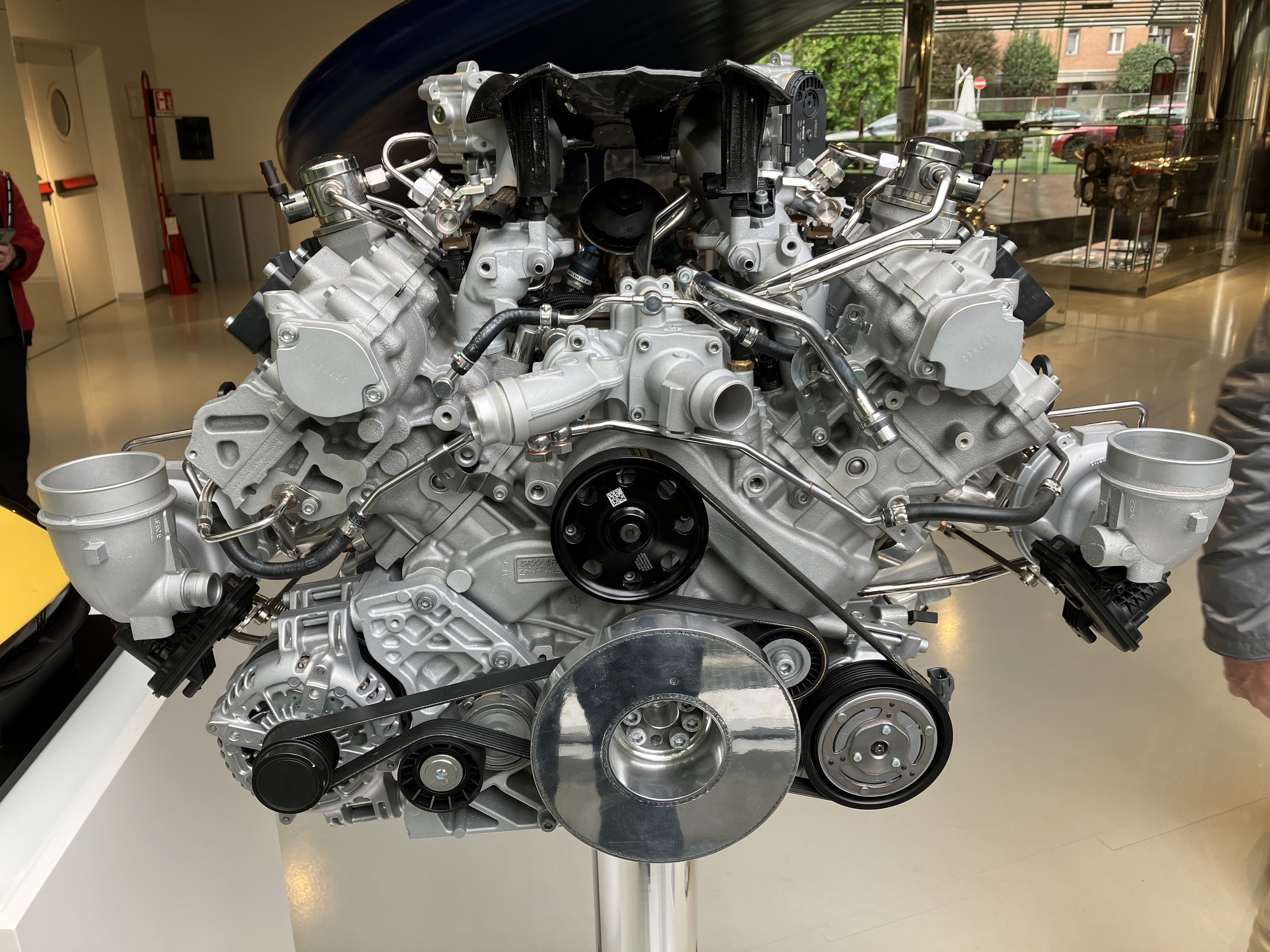
- Nettuno engine of the Maserati MC20, front view

Overview
- Manufacturer: Maserati
- Designer: Gianluca Pivetti and Matteo Valentini
- Production: 2020–present

Layout
- Configuration: 90° V6
- Displacement: 3.0 L; 182.6 cu in (2,992 cc)
- Cylinder bore: 88 mm (3.46 in)
- Piston stroke: 82 mm (3.23 in)
- Cylinder block material: Closed-deck Aluminium with wet steel cylinder liners
- Cylinder head material: Aluminium
- Valvetrain: DOHC, 24-valve with continuous camshaft phasing
- Valvetrain drive system: Chains
- Compression ratio: 11:1

RPM range
- Max. engine speed: 8,000 rpm

Combustion
- Turbocharger: Two single-scroll parallel turbochargers with electronic wastegates and air-to-liquid intercoolers
- Fuel system: Port and direct injection
- Fuel type: Petrol
- Oil system: Dry sump with scavenge pumps and external tank, water heat exchanger, variable-speed oil pump
- Cooling system: Water-cooled

Output
- Power output: 360–544 kW (490–740 PS; 483–730 hp) @ 7,500 rpm
- Torque output: 600–730 N⋅m (443–538 lb⋅ft) @ 3,000–5,500 rpm

Dimensions
- Length: 600 mm (24 in)
- Width: 1,000 mm (39 in)
- Height: 650 mm (26 in)
- Dry weight: 220 kg (490 lb)

The Maserati Nettuno is a twin-turbo port and direct injected V6 petrol engine with prechamber ignition, designed and produced by Maserati in its Modena plant since 2020.

== Development ==
The engine, an integral part of the renewal of the Modena brand, was born from the need to equip Maserati with a new generation engine, replacing the Ferrari-Maserati F136 V8 that previously equipped the cars of the trident. Starting with the MC20, the engine replaced the V8 F136 in Maserati's engine range. The new engine family is characterized by a displacement of 3.0 liters, with a maximum power output ranging between 360 and 471 kW (490 and 640 PS; 483 and 631 hp) in the versions approved for road use, and can reach 544 kW (740 PS; 730 hp) in the configurations intended for track use.

== Description ==
External image
- Nettuno engine cross section (drawing released by Maserati)

The engine represents a profound evolution of the Alfa Romeo 690T, in turn partly derived from the V8 Ferrari F154. The engine maintains the 6 cylinders with a 90-degree angle between the banks, firing order of 1-6-3-4-2-5, and a stroke of 82 mm from the 690T. The bore, however, was increased to 88 mm, thus reaching a total displacement of 3.0 liters. Similarly, the engine is equipped with two turbochargers mounted outside the banks, a configuration that realizes the so-called cold vee, as opposed to hot vee.

Characterized by a high compression ratio of 11 to 1, the engine is able to deliver specific powers of more than 200 hp/litre and maximum torque values above 700 N⋅m (520 lb⋅ft).

=== Combustion system ===
The engine is equipped with an innovative pre-chamber combustion system, called turbulent jet ignition (TJI). In the pre-chamber takes place the injection and combustion of a small amount of mixture; from this combustion a turbulent jet is generated that, through special holes, reaches the main chamber, triggering the actual combustion. This process creates a very large number of ignition points in the main chamber, significantly increasing the speed of flame propagation. Thanks to this optimized and more homogeneous combustion, it is possible to use lean mixtures in the main chamber and high compression ratios, improving engine efficiency while reducing emissions. This engine is also equipped with a dual ignition spark plug system, called Maserati Twin Combustion (MTC). The first spark plug is placed inside the prechamber and is used to trigger the first combustion. The second spark plug, on the other hand, is placed sideways in the main chamber and intervenes at partial load, when the turbulent jet generated in the prechamber may find it difficult to reach the main chamber. This is the first application of this technology to a mass-produced engine.

The engine is also equipped with a partial cylinder deactivation system, which at low load allows the operation of only three cylinders, excluding the entire right bank. This system is particularly innovative, as it is not only interrupting the injection and ignition, but also deactivates the intake and exhaust cycles. In this way, the resistances associated with the movement of the pistons in cylinders where there is no combustion is significantly reduced.

== Design and manufacturing ==
The engine was conceived and designed in Modena, between the workshops of the Tridente house, the Maserati Innovation Lab in Via Emilia Ovest, and the workshops in Via delle Nazioni, the historic headquarters of the Maserati Corse. The development and production are instead entrusted to the Polo Motori of the Ciro Menotti plant in Viale Ciro Menotti, the same production complex where the Maserati MC20 is also assembled. The project was led by Matteo Valentini, supported by a dedicated team created specifically. The engine is composed of about 1,300 components, and its assembly, while being artisanal, follows strict parameters controlled by computerized systems.

== Applications ==
=== Maserati ===
Engine code	Displacement Bore x stroke	Years	Usage	Power	Torque	Notes
	2992 cm³ 88 x 82 mm	2020–present	Maserati MC20 Maserati MC20 Cielo	463 kW (630 PS; 621 hp) at 7,500 rpm	730 N⋅m (540 lb⋅ft) at 3,000–5,500 rpm	Dry sump
	2992 cm³ 88 x 82 mm	2022–present	Maserati Grecale Trofeo	390 kW (530 PS; 523 hp) at 6,500 rpm	620 N⋅m (460 lb⋅ft) at 3,000–5,500 rpm	Wet sump
	2992 cm³ 88 x 82 mm	2022–present	Maserati GranTurismo Trofeo Maserati GranCabrio Trofeo	405 kW (550 PS; 542 hp) at 6,500 rpm	650 N⋅m (480 lb⋅ft) at 3,000–5,500 rpm	Wet sump
	2992 cm³ 88 x 82 mm	2022–present	Maserati GranTurismo Modena	360 kW (490 PS; 483 hp) at 6,500 rpm	600 N⋅m (440 lb⋅ft) at 3,000–5,500 rpm	Wet sump
	2992 cm³ 88 x 82 mm	2024–present	Maserati MCXtrema	544 kW (740 PS; 730 hp) at 7,500 rpm	730 N⋅m (540 lb⋅ft) at 3,000–5,500 rpm	Dry sump Not approved for road use
	2992 cm³ 88 x 82 mm	2024–present	Maserati MC20 GT2 Stradale	471 kW (640 PS; 631 hp) at 7,500 rpm	720 N⋅m (530 lb⋅ft) at 3,000–5,500 rpm	Dry sump
