= Maserati MC20 =

Italian high performance sports car model

Maserati MC20/MCPura Maserati MC20/MCPura Cielo
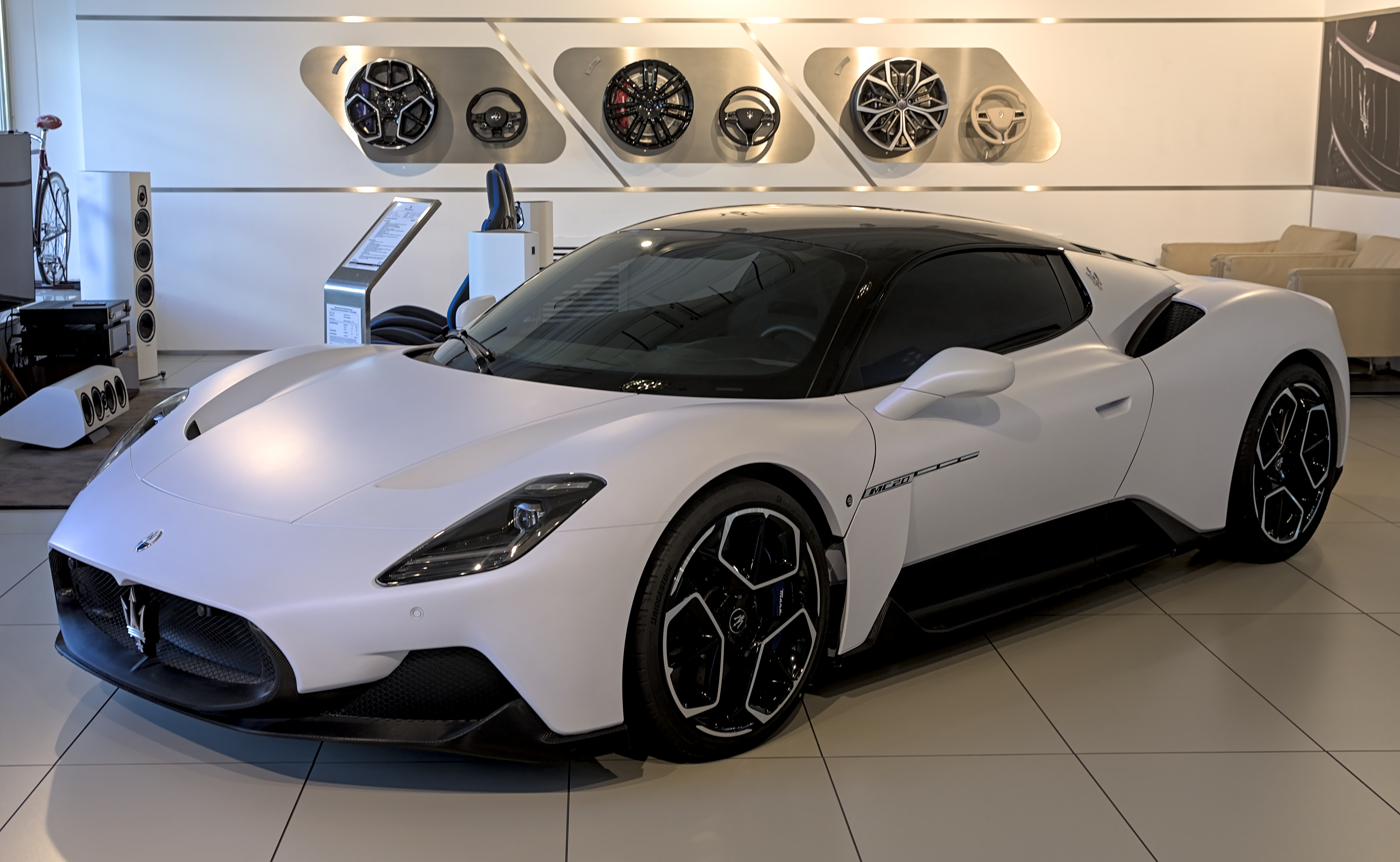

Overview
- Manufacturer: Maserati
- Also called: Maserati MCPura (2025–present)
- Production: 2020–present
- Assembly: Italy: Modena
- Designer: Klaus Busse at Centro Stile Maserati

Body and chassis
- Class: Sports car (S)
- Body style: 2-door coupé 2-door retractable hard-top convertible
- Layout: Rear mid-engine, rear-wheel drive
- Doors: Butterfly
- Related: Alfa Romeo 33 Stradale (2023)

Powertrain
- Engine: 3.0 L Maserati Nettuno 90° twin-turbocharged V6
- Power output: 463 kW (630 PS; 621 hp)
- Transmission: 8-speed Tremec TR-9080 dual-clutch

Dimensions
- Wheelbase: 2,700 mm (106.3 in)
- Length: 4,669 mm (183.8 in)
- Width: 1,965 mm (77.4 in)
- Height: 1,224 mm (48.2 in)
- Kerb weight: 1,475–1,540 kg (3,252–3,395 lb)

Chronology
- Predecessor: Maserati MC12 (spiritual)

The Maserati MC20 (MC being the acronym for Maserati Corse 2020, internal code M240) is a two-seater, rear-mid-engine sports car produced by Italian car manufacturer Maserati.

The debut of the MC20 was initially scheduled for May 2020, but was rescheduled along with brand redesign for September 2020 in Modena. A racing variant was also announced at the same time. The open top variant of the MC20 called the Cielo (Italian for sky) made its debut in May 2022. The car was developed by the Maserati Innovation Lab with an all-electric option slated to reach production in the future. The new sports car is produced at the Maserati Modena plant that is undergoing necessary modernization. The new car's logo appeared on a Maserati-sponsored Multi 70 trimaran's mainsail that was due to race in the RORC Caribbean 600.

Beginning in 2025, the MC20 was rebranded as the Maserati MCPura, which features slight design changes and a wider variety of paint options.

== Development ==
=== Test mules ===
In late 2019, a series of spy shots were published online showing a highly modified Alfa Romeo 4C-based test mule of an upcoming new Maserati sports car. Apart from the typical camouflage, the car featured a much larger rear portion and wider track.

Maserati later confirmed that it was using the test mules for development of a new powertrain for the upcoming sports car, but did not confirm whether the car will be based on the Alfa Romeo 4C's platform.

=== Prototypes ===
In March 2020, Maserati had completed their first prototype for the new car which was ready for both road and track testing.

On 13 May 2020, a prototype of the MC20 was covered with graphics commemorating Sir Stirling Moss, who died on 12 April 2020 at the age of 90. The Maserati 420M/58 "Eldorado", an iconic single-seater race car was also brought out on the commemoration of its debut in 1958 on the occasion of the Race of Two Worlds on Monza circuit.

The electric trimotor Folgore was tested in 2023, but canceled in 2025.

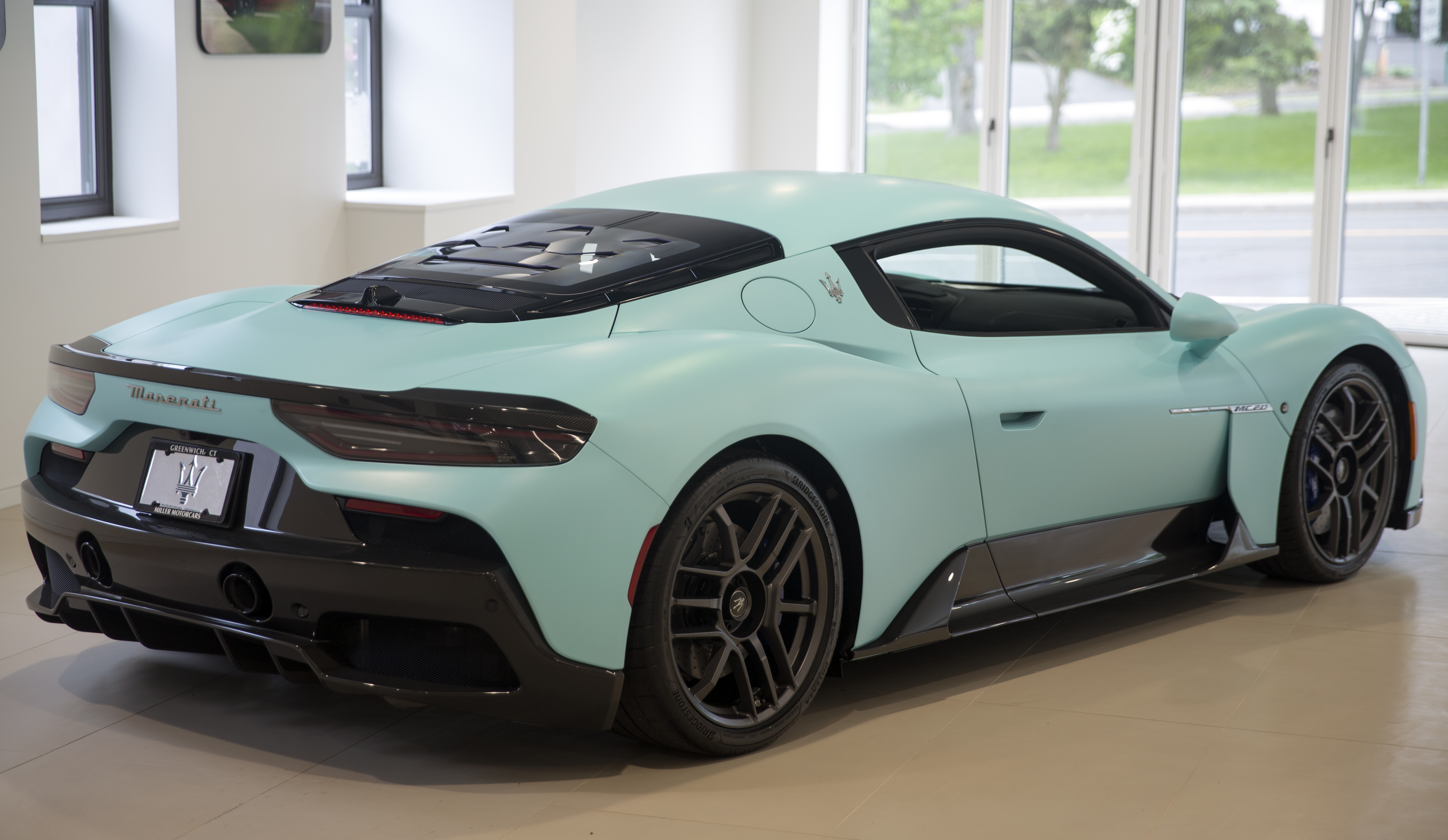
Rear view

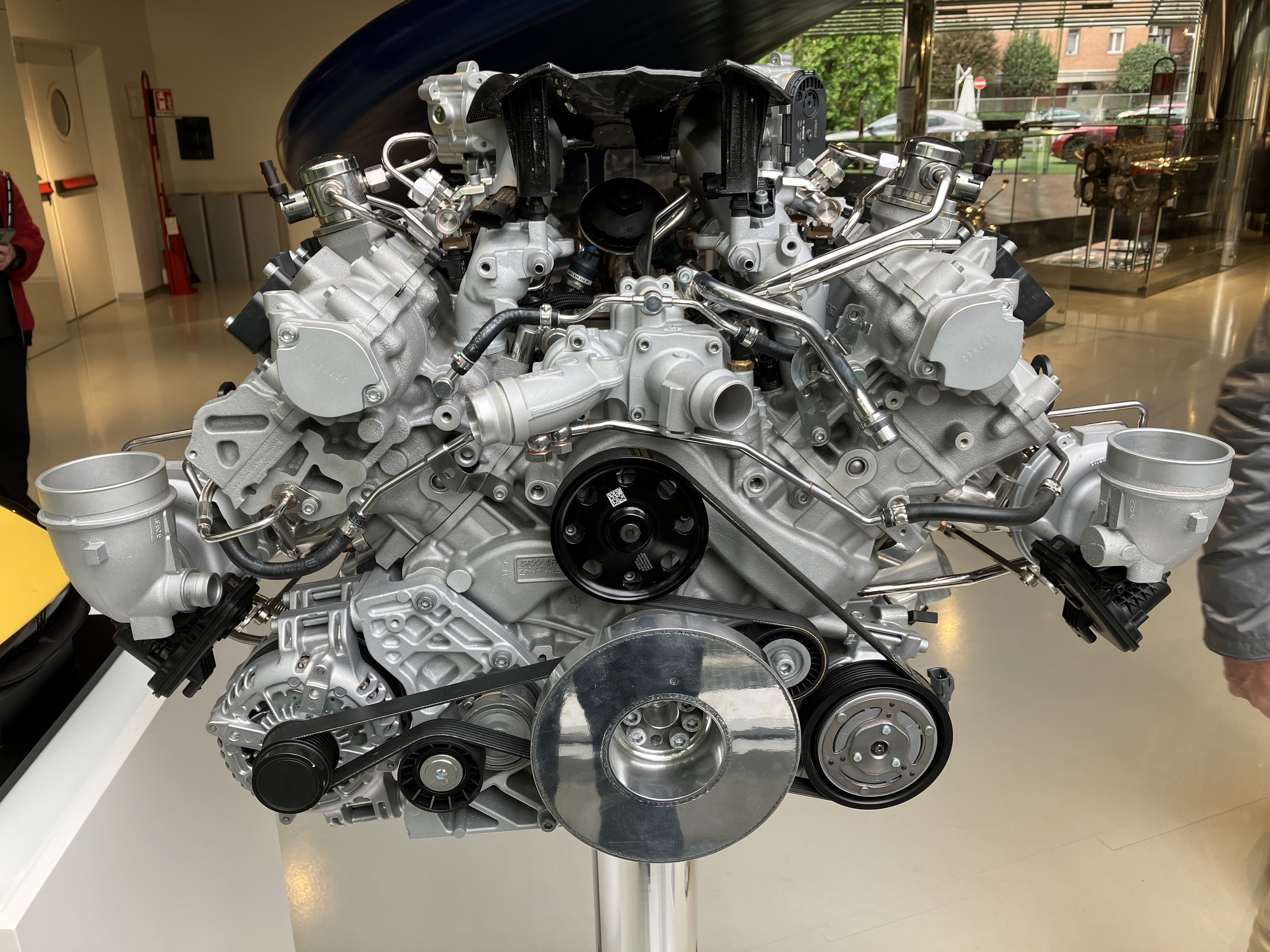
Nettuno engine at the Maserati Modena showroom

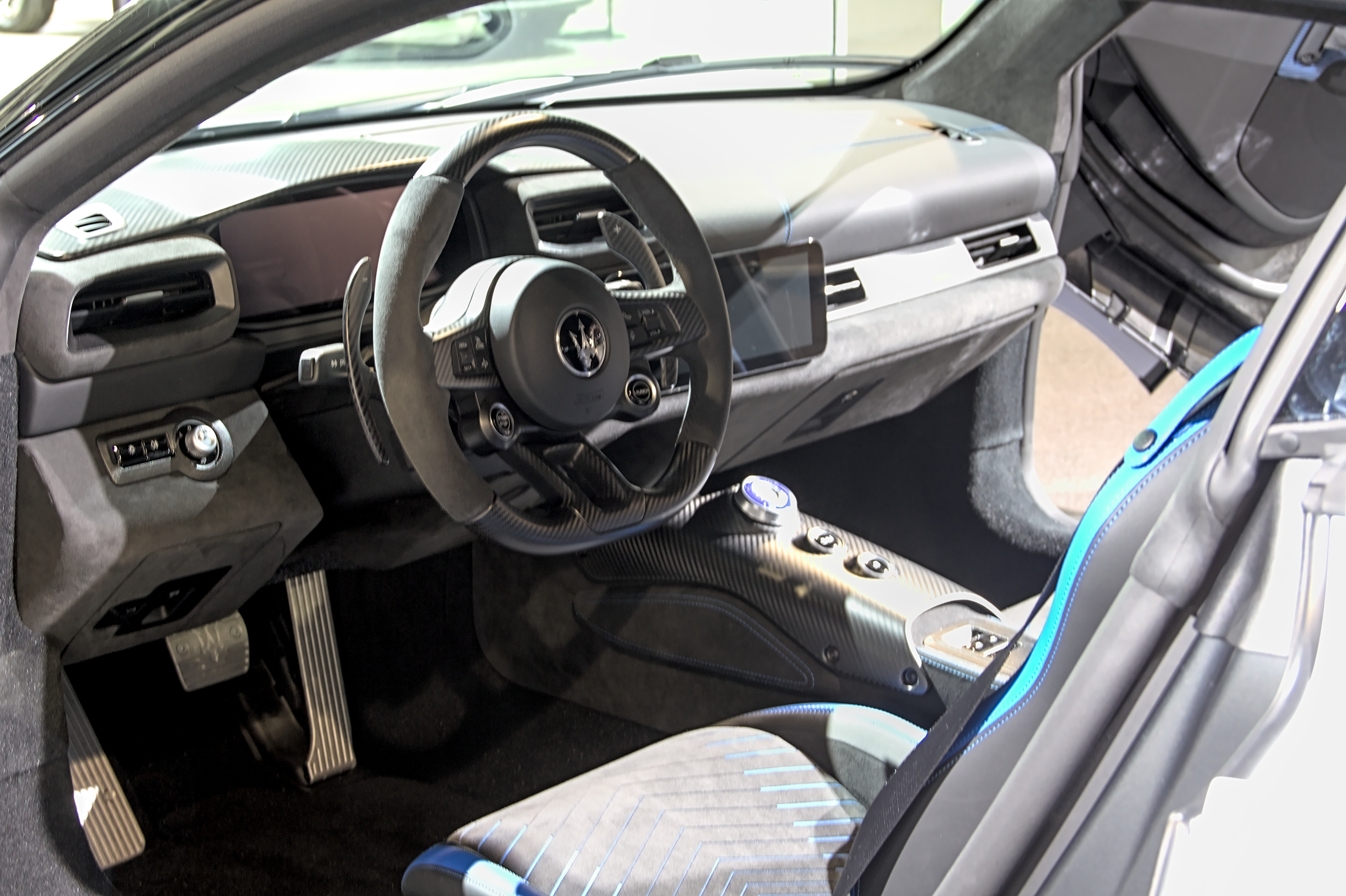
Interior

== Specifications ==
=== Engine ===
On 1 July 2020, Maserati announced a six-cylinder engine for the MC20 called the Nettuno. The engine was described as a 90-degree, 2,992 cc (3.0 L; 182.6 cu in) V6 with a dry sump, twin-spark and pre-chamber ignition system. It also has twin-turbochargers and fuel injectors. The 220 kg (485 lb) engine can generate a power output of 630 PS (463 kW; 621 hp) at 7,500 rpm and 730 N⋅m (538 lbf⋅ft) of torque from 3,000 to 5,500 rpm. The red-line of the engine is set at 8,000 rpm.

The engine's use of a passive pre-chamber is a unique quirk. Inspired by Formula 1 and combined with the use of twin-spark ignition, one inside the small cylindrical pre-chamber placed at the center of combustion chamber, and another placed in the traditional combustion chamber, designed to help combustion in low-load scenarios. The air-fuel mixture, provided by a hybrid port and direct injection system is compressed during the compression stroke of the engine into the pre-chamber, where it is then ignited by the chamber's spark plug. The resulting explosion spreads throughout the traditional chamber, creating a faster fuel burn. The system is mainly designed with the reduction of emissions in mind, but also promises increased fuel economy.

On 2 July 2020, Road & Track magazine criticized a press release from Maserati that claimed the engine is "100% Maserati". The magazine countered that "it's not hard to see the connection to the Ferrari F154 engine and the Alfa Romeo 690T engine". The publication argued that the similarities that were identical to the aforementioned engines included the 90-degree V angle, the firing order of 1-6-3-4-2-5 (identical to the F154-based V6 engine found in the Alfa Romeo Giulia and Stelvio), arrangement of cooling passages, cylinders, and liners, oil filter mounting, bore and stroke, and rev limit of 8,000 rpm (the same as the Ferrari SF90 Stradale). However, the unique 11:1 compression ratio indicated that the heads are new and Maserati-developed.

== Interior ==
The interior features a steering wheel constructed mostly of carbon fiber, with Alcantara accents. There is a TFT 10.25 inch digital instrument cluster, and a 10.25 inch infotainment screen. The seats have leather seating surfaces on the bolsters and headrest, with the middle seating surface made from Alcantara.

== Variants ==
=== Cielo (2022–present) ===
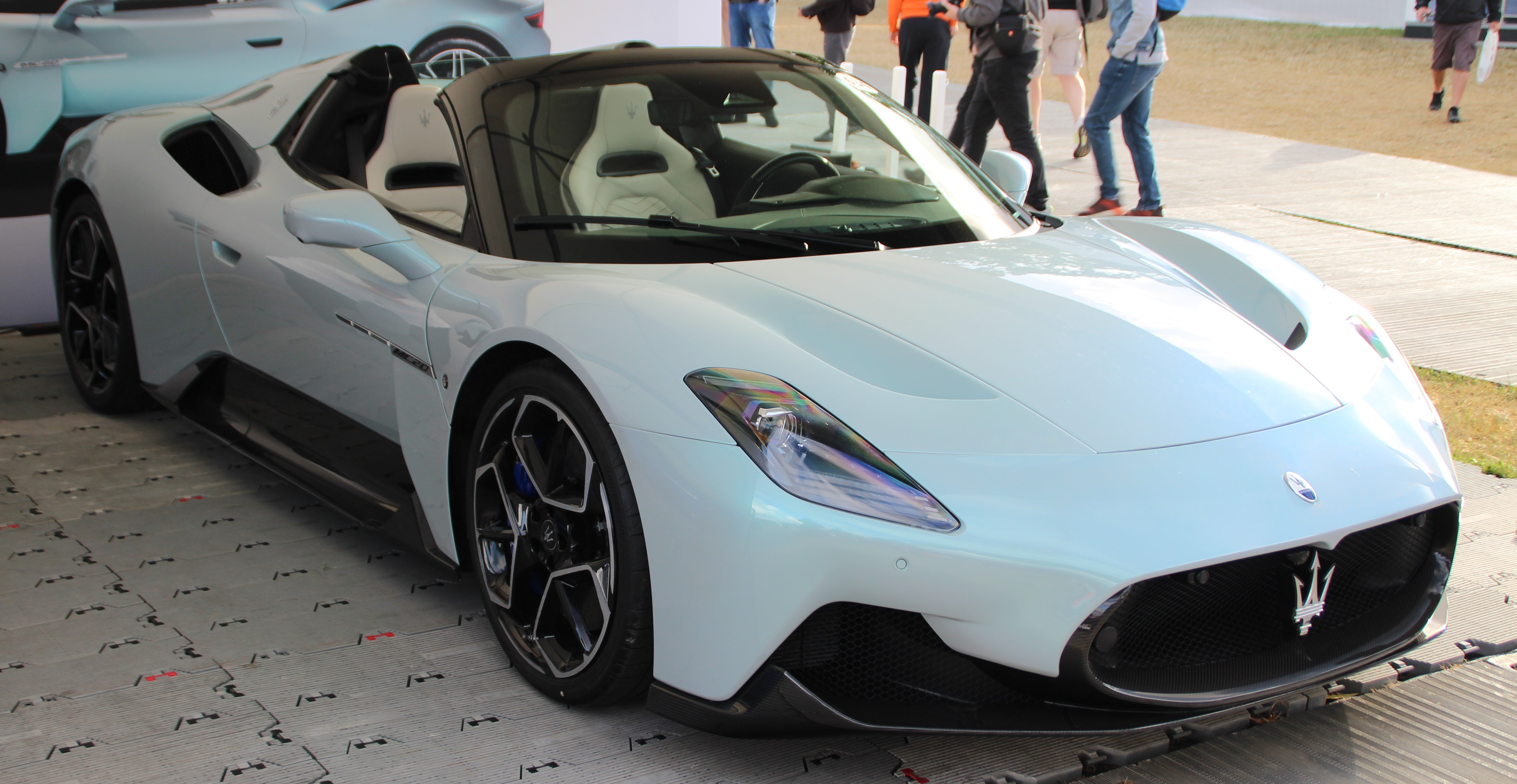
MC20 Cielo

In May 2022, Maserati unveiled the MC20 Cielo, an open-top variant of the MC20. It features the same 3.0 litre twin-turbo V6 and styling but adds on the two-piece foldable hard-top that has an electrochromic glass roof. The roof system adds an additional 65 kg (143 lb), and the folding and unfolding of the roof sequence takes only 12 seconds.

=== MCXtrema (2023) ===
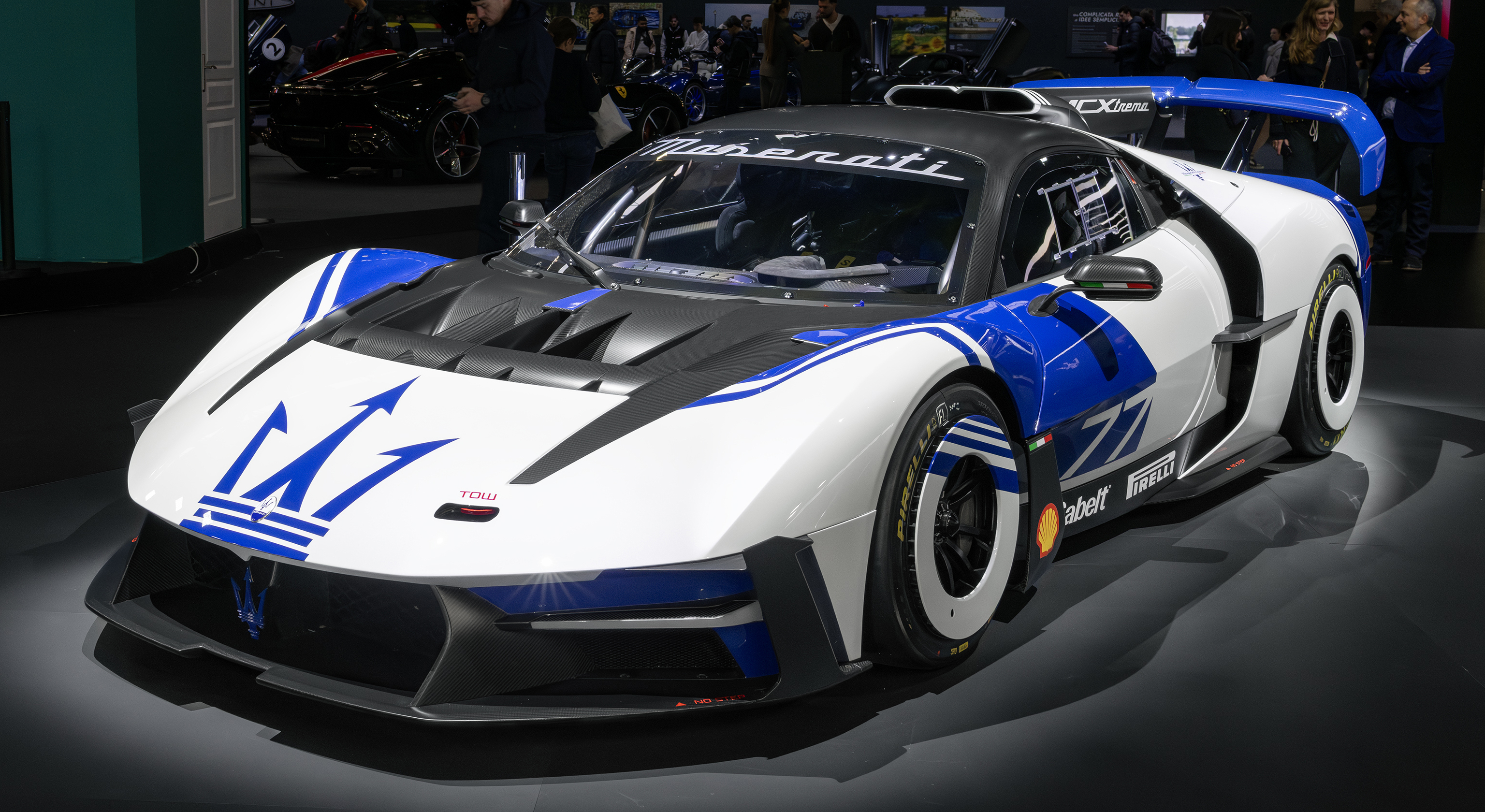
MCXtrema

The MCXtrema is a track-only derivative of the Maserati MC20 introduced in August 2023, with significant weight savings and more advanced aerodynamics. The Nettuno engine found in the MC20 has also undergone changes to produce more power. Customers who purchase the car will be able to customise it via Maserati's Fuoriserie (custom-built) program, and production will be limited to 62 units.

The car features significant use of carbon-fibre along with other natural fibres to significantly lower the weight compared to the road-legal MC20. Maserati aims for a dry weight of 1,250 kg (2,756 lb), which would mean that it is over 250 kg (551 lb) lighter than the MC20. Double wishbone suspension along with adjustable dampers, front and rear anti-roll bars provide ride height control for the car. The Nettuno engine has been fitted with two new turbochargers, increasing the power output to 544 kW (740 PS; 730 hp), sent to the rear 18 in forged aluminium wheels via a 6-speed sequential manual transmission paired with a mechanical limited-slip differential. Stopping power is provided by ventilated carbon ceramic Brembo brakes. Other features include a FIA-standard 120 L (32 US gal; 26 imp gal) fuel tank, along with a FIA-standard fire extinguisher and roll cage. Air-conditioning, a feature traditionally not found on track-focused cars, is also standard along with a seat for a passenger.

=== Icona (2024) ===
MC20 Icona recalls the livery and colors of the 2004 MC12 Stradale.

=== Leggenda (2024) ===
MC20 Legenda recalls the livery and colors of the Maserati MC12 GT1.

=== Tributo Modenese (2024) ===
Maserati has created this new one-off MC20 for the 2024 Monterey Car Week.

=== GT2 Stradale (2024) ===
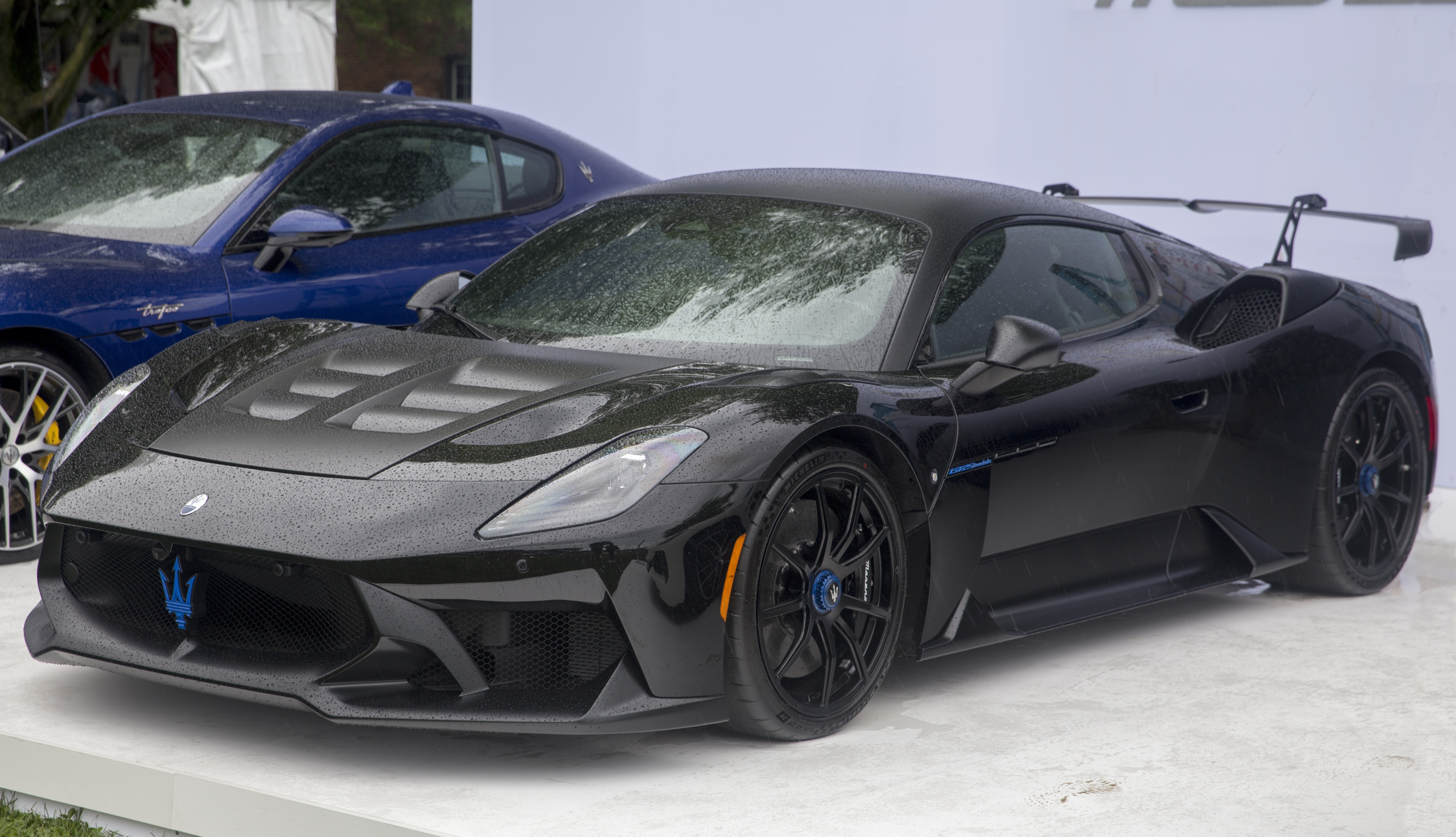
GT2 Stradale

At the 2024 Monterey Car Week Maserati presented the GT2 Stradale, the GT2 version approved for road use but with extreme track performance. The Maserati GT2 Stradale is powered by a 640 hp 3.0 twin-turbo Nettuno V6 with rear-wheel drive and a dual-clutch automatic transmission with 10 more horsepower and 60 kg less than other MC20 variants.

=== MC20 Maserati per Maserati (2024) ===
Maserati has unveiled an exclusive version of the MC20 tailor-made for Alberto and Ettore Maserati, descendants of founder Ettore Maserati. This special edition, called "MC20 Maserati for Maserati", is part of the Fuoriserie customization program. The car stands out with Blu Infinito livery and a double stripe in Bianco Pastello, a combination that recalls the style of racing cars.

=== MC20 Fuoriserie (2025) ===
The Maserati MC20 Fuoriserie represent tailor-made cars built by the specific department called Officine Fuoriserie, where the buyer requests a completely customized MC20. Among these is the Trident Collection, made up of three Maserati MC20 cars with Blu Nettuno, Blu Oceano and Blu Mediterraneo liveries.

=== MC20 Cielo Opera d’Arte (2025) ===
On November 21, 2025, at the Milano AutoClassica, held at Fiera Milano (Rho), Maserati presented a one-of-a-kind MC20 Cielo Opera d’Arte. The special hand-painted car, created by Officine Fuoriserie, quickly became the event's one of the headline attractions.

== MCPura (2025) ==
The Maserati MCPura was unveiled at the Goodwood Festival of Speed 2025. It is largely based on the previous MC20 but features minor stylistic changes, including redesigned front and rear fascias in addition to slightly modified driver and passenger seats. It is expected to begin production in 2026 and will replace the MC20. As for the MC20, the MCPura is also available in open-top "Cielo" version. Furthermore, the customization program developed by Officine Fuoriserie also continues for the MCPura. In particular, it was unveiled in the AI Acqua Rainbow color belonging to the Fuoriserie Collezione Futura program.

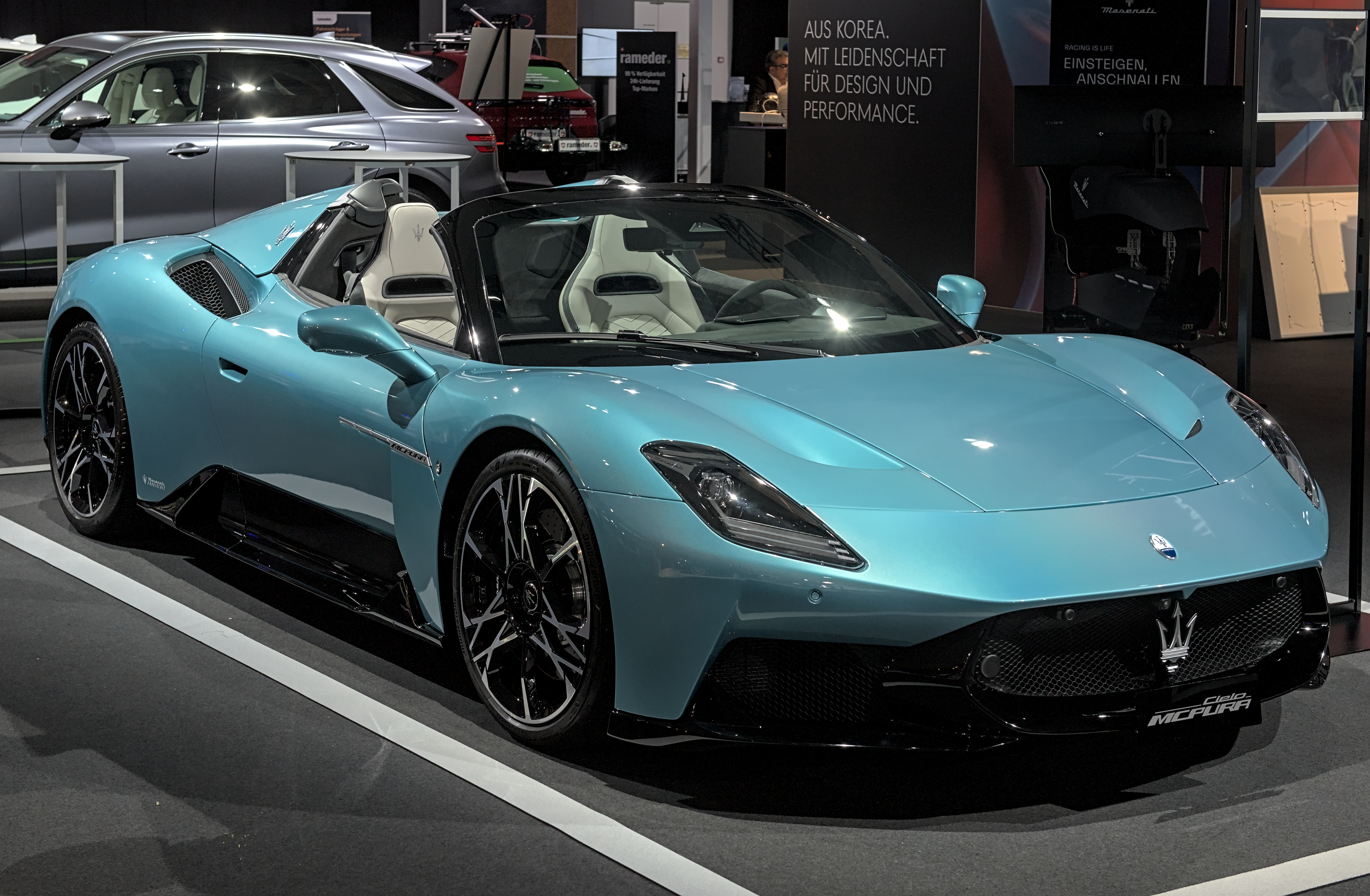
MCPura Cielo

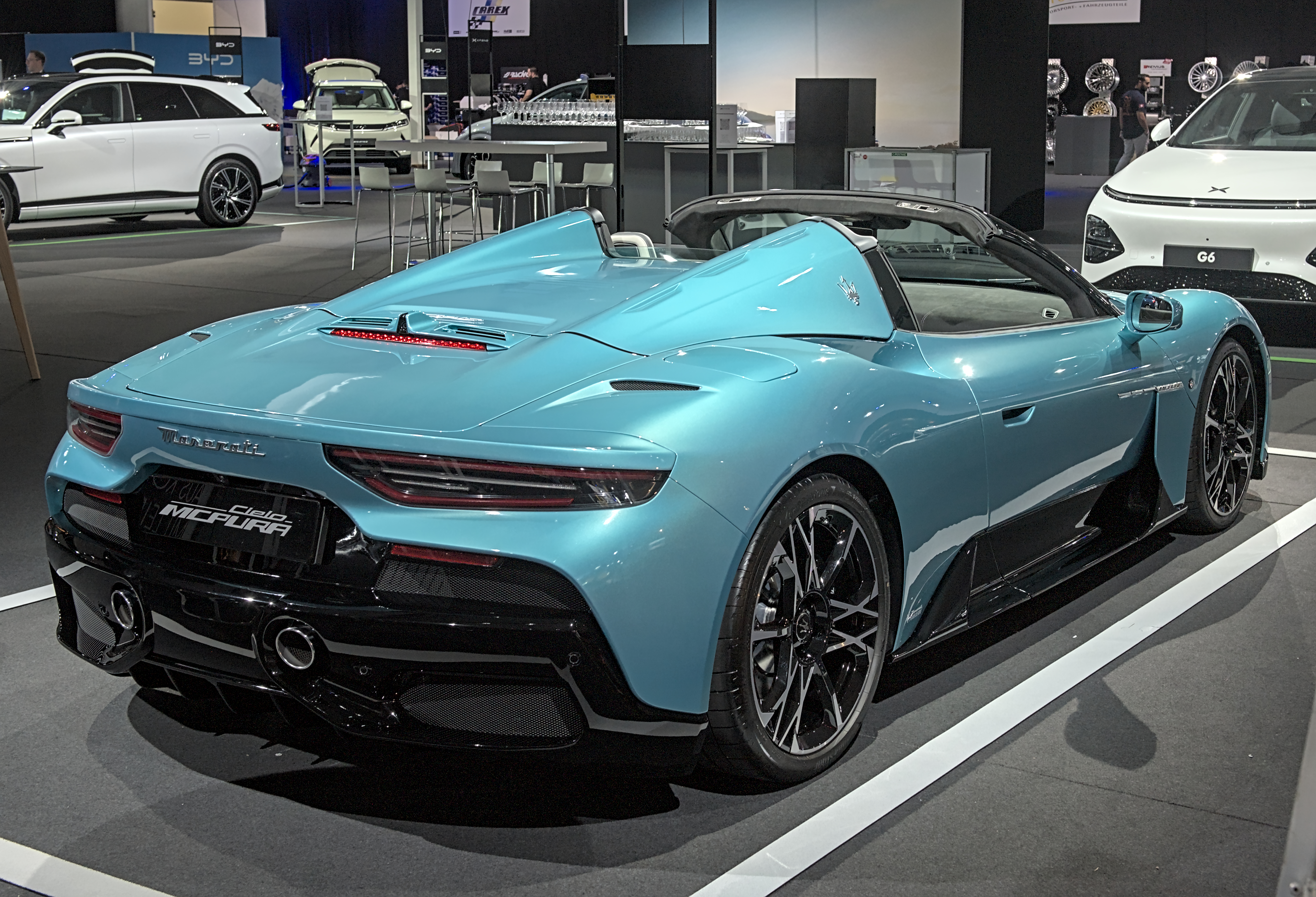
Rear view (MCPura Cielo)

=== MCPura Carabinieri (2025) ===
On 27 October 2025, a custom-built Maserati MCPura for the Carabinieri was delivered, along with an Alfa Romeo Giulia Quadrifoglio, already in service with the Carabinieri. The ceremony took place at the Carabinieri General Headquarters in Rome, in the presence of Commander General Salvatore Luongo, Chief of Staff General Andrea Taurelli Salimbeni, and Head of the IV "Logistics Support" Department General Antonio Di Stasio. Stellantis was represented by CEO Antonio Filosa, the new head of Stellantis Europe, Emanuele Cappellano, Alfa Romeo Brand Manager and COO of Maserati, Santo Ficili, and CEO of Stellantis Italy, Antonella Bruno.

=== MCPura Mille Miglia Centenario (2027) ===
The MCPura Cielo Mille Miglia Centenario is a car that will celebrate the centenary of the famous Mille Miglia race. The car, painted Rosso Vincente, is inspired by the 1957 Maserati 450S (Tipo 54). It also celebrates the 70th anniversary of the car it was inspired by and the final year of the race.

== Motorsport ==
Ahead of the 2022 24 hours of Spa, Maserati launched the MC20 GT2 intended for competition in the GT2 European Series in 2023.

=== GT2 (2023–present) ===
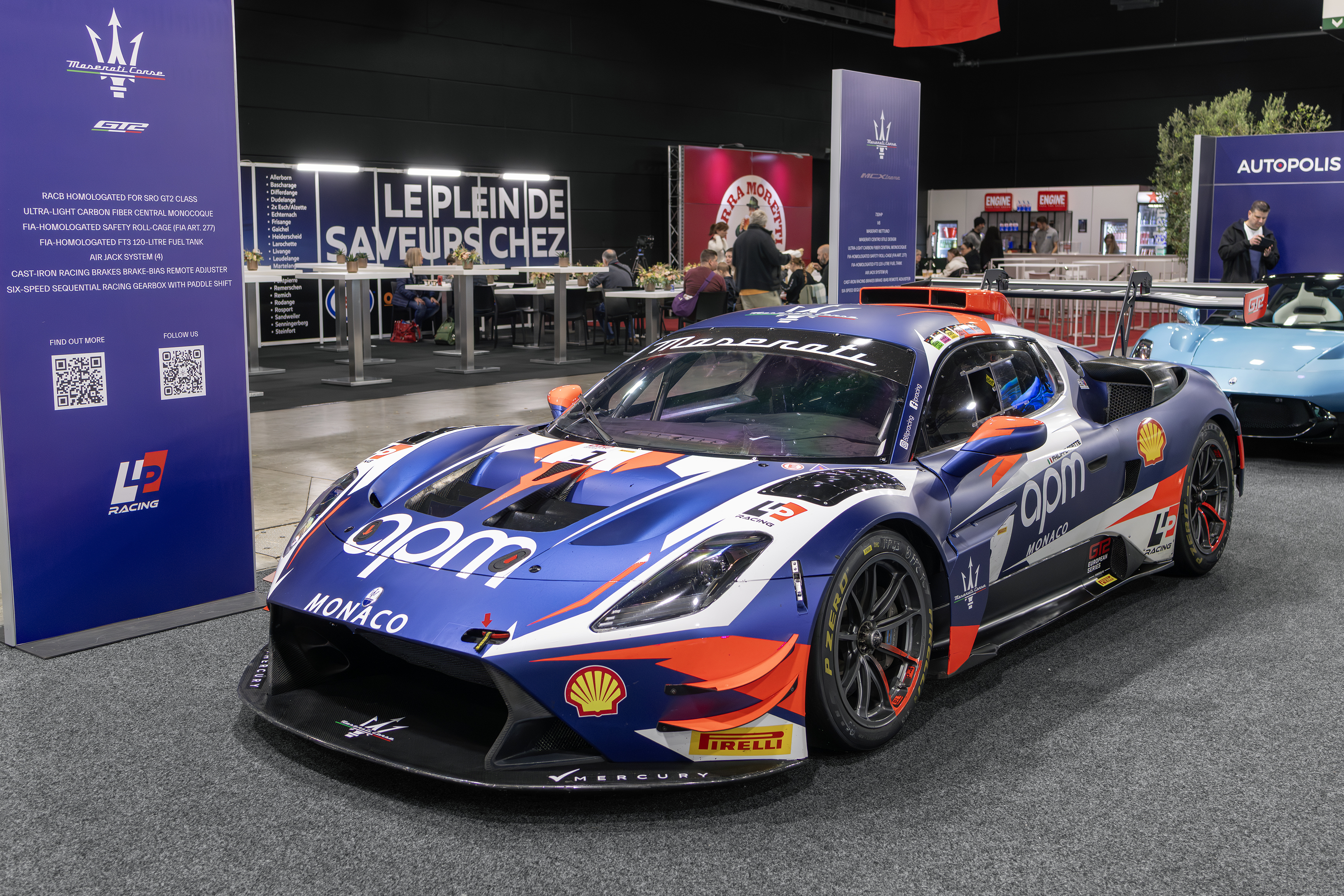
MC20 GT2

The racing variant of the MC20, named the GT2, made its public debut at the 2023 24 Hours of Spa in June 2023. While the engine and body shell remain the same as the road-going counterpart, the differences include an aerodynamic package consisting of a large rear wing, a new rear diffuser and a roof scoop, a stripped down interior having a single seat, fire extinguisher, adjustable steering wheel column and pedal box, a new 6.5-inch display and an FIA homologated roll-cage while retaining the air-conditioning, a six-speed sequential gearbox with a self-locking mechanical limited-slip differential, two-way adjustable dampers, a racing spec exhaust system and 18-inch forged alloy wheels. An extreme aero package consisting of canards on the front bumper, a front splitter and a newly designed hood is optional. Customers can also add the passenger seat, a rearview camera and a tire pressure monitoring system at an extra cost. The car made its racing debut at the final round of the Fanatec GT2 European Series with LP Racing, taking pole position and finishing in second place in race one, while finishing seventh in race two. In 2024, LP Racing will compete and defend the title with two MC20s; Van Der Horst Motorsport and TFT Racing will also compete with the Maserati MC20 GT2.
