= 2016 Blancpain GT Sports Club =

Seasons
- ← 2015 2017 →

The 2016 Blancpain GT Sports Club was the second season of the SRO Group's Blancpain GT Sports Club, an auto racing series for grand tourer cars. The Blancpain GT Sports Club is a championship for Bronze and Iron drivers only. The "Iron" categorisation is within the Bronze category, for drivers over the age of 60. All drivers must participate with GT3-spec cars, RACB G3 cars or GTE-spec cars.

== Calendar ==
Event	Circuit	Date	Supporting
1	Misano World Circuit Marco Simoncelli, Misano, Italy	10 April	Blancpain GT Series Sprint Cup
2	(United Kingdom) Brands Hatch, Kent, Great Britain	8 May	Blancpain GT Series Sprint Cup
3	Circuit Paul Ricard, Le Castellet, France	26 June	Blancpain GT Series Endurance Cup
4	Circuit de Spa-Francorchamps, Spa, Belgium	30 July	Total 24 Hours of Spa
5	Circuit de Barcelona-Catalunya, Montmeló, Spain	2 October	Blancpain GT Series Sprint Cup

== Entry list ==
Team	Car	No.	Driver	Class	Rounds
(Italy) Oregon Team	Renault R.S. 01	1	(Italy) Davide Roda	Xtra	4
(France) Saintéloc Junior Team	Audi R8 LMS ultra	5	(France) Claude-Yves Gosselin		All
(France) Saintéloc Junior Team	Audi R8 LMS ultra	6	(France) Pierre Feligioni		All
(France) Saintéloc Junior Team	Audi R8 LMS ultra	7	(France) Gilles Lallemant		2–3
(France) JPB Racing	Mercedes-Benz SLS AMG GT3	9	(France) Jean-Paul Buffin		All
(Switzerland) Kessel Racing (Note: Cars No. 11, 38, 65, 77, 111 and 177 entered as Kessel Racing under Swiss licence, car No. 60 entered as Team Malucelli under Sammarinese licence and car No. 88 entered as Dragon Racing under Emirate licence.) (San Marino) Team Malucelli (United Arab Emirates) Dragon Racing	Ferrari 458 Italia GTE	11	(Poland) Michał Broniszewski		1
(Switzerland) Kessel Racing (San Marino) Team Malucelli (United Arab Emirates) Dragon Racing	Ferrari 458 Italia GT3	11	(Poland) Michał Broniszewski		2–5
(Switzerland) Kessel Racing (San Marino) Team Malucelli (United Arab Emirates) Dragon Racing	Ferrari 458 Italia GT3	38	(Hong Kong) Wong Chong Yau Runme		1
(Switzerland) Kessel Racing (San Marino) Team Malucelli (United Arab Emirates) Dragon Racing	Ferrari 458 Italia GT3	60	(San Marino) Marco Galassi		4
(Switzerland) Kessel Racing (San Marino) Team Malucelli (United Arab Emirates) Dragon Racing	Ferrari 458 Italia GT3	65	(Luxembourg) Alexis De Bernardi		All
(Switzerland) Kessel Racing (San Marino) Team Malucelli (United Arab Emirates) Dragon Racing	Ferrari 458 Italia GT3	77	(Italy) Marco Zanuttini		4
(Switzerland) Kessel Racing (San Marino) Team Malucelli (United Arab Emirates) Dragon Racing	Ferrari 458 Italia GT3	88	(South Africa) Leon Price	Iron	All
(Switzerland) Kessel Racing (San Marino) Team Malucelli (United Arab Emirates) Dragon Racing	Ferrari 458 Italia GT3	111	(United States) Stephen Earle	Iron	All
(Switzerland) Kessel Racing (San Marino) Team Malucelli (United Arab Emirates) Dragon Racing	Ferrari 458 Italia GT3	177	(Netherlands) Fons Scheltema		5
(Belgium) Team WRT	Audi R8 LMS ultra	12	(Belgium) Jean-Michel Baert		1–4
(Belgium) Team WRT	Audi R8 LMS	12	(Belgium) Jean-Michel Baert		5
(Belgium) Team WRT	Audi R8 LMS ultra	25	(Belgium) Louis-Philippe Soenen	Iron	All
(Austria) HP Racing	Lamborghini Gallardo GT3	17	(Germany) Coach McKansy		All
(Austria) HP Racing	Mercedes-Benz SLS AMG GT3	18	(Liechtenstein) Daniel Vogt		3–5
(Belgium) Boutsen Ginion	BMW M6 GT3	18	(Saudi Arabia) Karim Ojjeh		2
(France) CMR	BMW Z4 GT3	21	(Switzerland) Pierre Hirschi		1, 3–4
(France) CMR	Ferrari 458 Italia GT3	22	(France) Nicolas Misslin		1
(France) CMR	Mercedes-Benz SLS AMG GT3	30	(France) Marc Sourd	Iron	3
(France) CMR	Ferrari 458 Italia GT3	300	(France) Éric Cayrolle		5
(San Marino) Stile F Squadra Corse	Ferrari 458 Italia GTE	23	(Switzerland) Martin Grab		3
(San Marino) Stile F Squadra Corse	Ferrari 458 Italia GTE	666	(Switzerland) Yoshiki Ohmura		1, 3
(Germany) HTP Motorsport	Mercedes-AMG GT3	39	(Netherlands) Wim de Pundert		1–3, 5
(Germany) Artega Rennsport	Ferrari 488 GT3	46	(Germany) Klaus Dieter Frers	Iron	3–5
(Italy) AF Corse (Note: Cars No. 48, 49, 50, 51, 54 and 488 entered as AF Corse under Italian licence and car No. 52 entered as Kaspersky Motorsport under Russian licence.) (Russia) Kaspersky Motorsport	Ferrari 458 Italia GTE	48	(Monaco) Martin Lanting	Iron	All
(Italy) AF Corse (Russia) Kaspersky Motorsport	Ferrari 458 Italia GT3	49	(Italy) Mario Cordoni		All
(Italy) AF Corse (Russia) Kaspersky Motorsport	Ferrari 458 Italia GTE	50	(Italy) Piergiuseppe Perazzini	Iron	1
(Italy) AF Corse (Russia) Kaspersky Motorsport	Ferrari 458 Italia GTE	51	(Switzerland) Christoph Ulrich		1, 3–4
(Italy) AF Corse (Russia) Kaspersky Motorsport	Ferrari 458 Italia GT3	51	(Switzerland) Christoph Ulrich		5
(Italy) AF Corse (Russia) Kaspersky Motorsport	Ferrari 458 Italia GT3	52	(Russia) Garry Kondakov		3
(Italy) AF Corse (Russia) Kaspersky Motorsport	Ferrari 458 Italia GT3	54	(United States) Michael Luzich	Iron	1–2
(Italy) AF Corse (Russia) Kaspersky Motorsport	Ferrari 488 GT3	488	(Belgium) Patrick Van Glabeke		1, 3–5
(Italy) AF Corse (Russia) Kaspersky Motorsport	Ferrari 458 Italia GT3	488	(Belgium) Patrick Van Glabeke		2
(Belgium) Selleslagh Racing Team	Corvette ZR1 GTE	63	(Belgium) Nicolas Vandierendonck		All
(Germany) Attempto Racing	Lamborghini Huracán Super Trofeo	66	(Italy) Mauro Casadei	Xtra	1
(Spain) Monlau Competición	Renault R.S. 01	69	(Belgium) Jürgen Smet	Xtra	5
(France) AKKA ASP	Ferrari 458 Italia GTE	72	(France) Anthony Pons		1–2, 4–5
(France) AKKA ASP	Mercedes-AMG GT3	87	(Switzerland) Daniele Perfetti		3
(France) AKKA ASP	Mercedes-AMG GT3	89	(France) Maurice Ricci		1, 3, 5
(Spain) Baporo Motorsport	Ferrari 458 Italia GT3	93	(Spain) Jaime Font Casas		5
(Sweden) JB Motorsport	Audi R8 LMS ultra	98	(Sweden) Jan Brunstedt	Iron	All
(Netherlands) Mentos Racing	Porsche 997 GT3 RSR	154	(Italy) Augusto Perfetti	Iron	3
(Netherlands) Mentos Racing	Porsche 911 GT3 R	888	(Norway) Egidio Perfetti		3
(Germany) Black Pearl Racing	Ferrari 458 Italia GT3	458	(Germany) Christian Hook		1
(Switzerland) X-Bionic Racing Team	Lamborghini Huracán GT3	963	(Switzerland) Cédric Leimer		5

Icon	Class
Iron	Iron Cup
Xtra	Xtra Cup

== Race results ==
Event	Circuit	Pole position	Qualifying Race Winner	Main Race		
Event	Circuit	Pole position	Qualifying Race Winner	Overall winner	Iron Cup Winner	Xtra Cup Winner
1	(Italy) Misano	(France) No. 22 CMR	(France) No. 22 CMR	(Italy) No. 49 AF Corse	(Italy) No. 50 AF Corse	(Germany) No. 66 Attempto Racing
1	(Italy) Misano	(France) Nicolas Misslin	(France) Nicolas Misslin	(Italy) Mario Cordoni	(Italy) Piergiuseppe Perazzini	(Italy) Mauro Casadei
2	(United Kingdom) Brands Hatch	(Switzerland) No. 11 Kessel Racing	(Switzerland) No. 11 Kessel Racing	(Switzerland) No. 11 Kessel Racing	(Switzerland) No. 111 Kessel Racing	No entries
2	(United Kingdom) Brands Hatch	(Poland) Michał Broniszewski	(Poland) Michał Broniszewski	(Poland) Michał Broniszewski	(United States) Stephen Earle	No entries
3	(France) Paul Ricard	(Netherlands) No. 888 Mentos Racing	(France) No. 87 AKKA ASP	(France) No. 87 AKKA ASP	(Italy) No. 48 AF Corse	No entries
3	(France) Paul Ricard	(Norway) Egidio Perfetti	(Switzerland) Daniele Perfetti	(Switzerland) Daniele Perfetti	(Monaco) Martin Lanting	No entries
4	(Belgium) Spa-Francorchamps	(Switzerland) No. 11 Kessel Racing	(Switzerland) No. 11 Kessel Racing	(Switzerland) No. 11 Kessel Racing	(Italy) No. 48 AF Corse	(Italy) No. 1 Oregon Team
4	(Belgium) Spa-Francorchamps	(Poland) Michał Broniszewski	(Poland) Michał Broniszewski	(Poland) Michał Broniszewski	(Monaco) Martin Lanting	(Italy) Davide Roda
5	(Spain) Barcelona-Catalunya	(Belgium) No. 63 Selleslagh Racing Team	(Switzerland) No. 963 X-Bionic Racing Team	(Switzerland) No. 963 X-Bionic Racing Team	(Switzerland) No. 111 Kessel Racing	(Spain) No. 69 Monlau Competición
5	(Spain) Barcelona-Catalunya	(Belgium) Nicolas Vandierendonck	(Switzerland) Cédric Leimer	(Switzerland) Cédric Leimer	(United States) Stephen Earle	(Belgium) Jürgen Smet

== Championship standings ==
Scoring system

Championship points were awarded for the first six positions in each Qualifying Race and for the first ten positions in each Main Race. Entries were required to complete 75% of the winning car's race distance in order to be classified and earn points.

Qualifying Race points

Position	**1st**	**2nd**	**3rd**	**4th**	**5th**	**6th**
Points	8	6	4	3	2	1

Main Race points

Position	**1st**	**2nd**	**3rd**	**4th**	**5th**	**6th**	**7th**	**8th**	**9th**	**10th**
Points	25	18	15	12	10	8	6	4	2	1

=== Drivers' championships ===
==== Overall ====
Pos.	Driver	Team	MIS (Italy)		BRH (United Kingdom)		LEC (France)		SPA (Belgium)		CAT (Spain)		Points
Pos.	Driver	Team	QR	MR	QR	MR	QR	MR	QR	MR	QR	MR	Points
1	(Poland) Michał Broniszewski	(Switzerland) Kessel Racing	DNS	DNS	**1**	1	8	3	**1**	1	2	2	105
2	(Belgium) Nicolas Vandierendonck	(Belgium) Selleslagh Racing Team	10	5	4	9	6	8	3	3	**4**	3	62
3	(Italy) Mario Cordoni	(Italy) AF Corse	4	1	16	5	Ret	DNS	7	10	3	6	53
4	(Belgium) Patrick Van Glabeke	(Italy) AF Corse	19	11	2	3	Ret	DNS	20	5	7	9	35
5	(Monaco) Martin Lanting	(Italy) AF Corse	16	4	19	8	4	7	6	7	11	21	35
6	(Switzerland) Cédric Leimer	(Switzerland) X-Bionic Racing Team									1	1	33
6	(Switzerland) Daniele Perfetti	(France) AKKA ASP					1	1					33
7	(Luxembourg) Alexis De Bernardi	(Switzerland) Kessel Racing	13	DNS	6	4	5	13	5	4	9	11	33
8	(France) Nicolas Misslin	(France) CMR	**1**	2									26
9	(Saudi Arabia) Karim Ojjeh	(Belgium) Boutsen Ginion			3	2							22
10	(Germany) Coach McKansy	(Austria) HP Racing	9	Ret	7	6	3	5	18	15	13	16	22
11	(Italy) Piergiuseppe Perazzini	(Italy) AF Corse	2	3									21
12	(France) Maurice Ricci	(France) AKKA ASP	7	9			16	6			6	5	21
13	(France) Anthony Pons	(France) AKKA ASP	3	Ret	8	DNS			4	6	10	10	19
14	(Liechtenstein) Daniel Vogt	(Austria) HP Racing					2	4	14	18	DNS	15	18
15	(Norway) Egidio Perfetti	(Netherlands) Mentos Racing					**7**	2					18
16	(Switzerland) Pierre Hirschi	(France) CMR	6	6			11	15	12	8			15
17	(United States) Stephen Earle	(Switzerland) Kessel Racing	12	8	10	7	12	10	9	9	22	13	15
18	(France) Éric Cayrolle	(France) CMR									5	4	14
19	(Belgium) Jean-Michel Baert	(Belgium) Team WRT	5	7	Ret	16	9	11	10	22	14	Ret	8
20	(Spain) Jaime Font Casas	(Spain) Baporo Motorsport									21	7	6
21	(Switzerland) Christoph Ulrich	(Italy) AF Corse	15	13			26	18	16	11	8	8	5
22	(Sweden) Jan Brunstedt	(Sweden) JB Motorsport	14	10	5	15	13	12	19	12	15	14	3
23	(France) Marc Sourd	(France) CMR					10	9					2
24	(France) Gilles Lallemant	(France) Saintéloc Junior Team			9	10	27	Ret					1
	(Germany) Christian Hook	(Germany) Black Pearl Racing	8	15									0
	(Italy) Marco Zanuttini	(Switzerland) Kessel Racing							8	17			0
	(South Africa) Leon Price	(United Arab Emirates) Dragon Racing	22	18	11	11	20	22	17	20	23	DNS	0
	(France) Claude-Yves Gosselin	(France) Saintéloc Junior Team	11	12	15	Ret	14	16	Ret	16	18	18	0
	(Germany) Klaus Dieter Frers	(Germany) Artega Rennsport					19	21	11	14	DNS	17	0
	(Netherlands) Fons Scheltema	(Switzerland) Kessel Racing									12	12	0
	(France) Jean-Paul Buffin	(France) JPB Racing	20	14	12	Ret	17	14	DNS	DNS	Ret	DNS	0
	(Belgium) Louis-Philippe Soenen	(Belgium) Team WRT	18	16	14	12	15	17	15	19	19	20	0
	(San Marino) Marco Galassi	(San Marino) Team Malucelli							13	13			0
	(Netherlands) Wim de Pundert	(Germany) HTP Motorsport	21	17	13	Ret	18	19			16	23	0
	(France) Pierre Feligioni	(France) Saintéloc Junior Team	24	Ret	18	13	24	25	21	21	20	19	0
	(United States) Michael Luzich	(Italy) AF Corse	23	21	17	14							0
	(Switzerland) Yoshiki Ohmura	(San Marino) Stile F Squadra Corse	25	19			23	Ret					0
	(Italy) Augusto Perfetti	(Netherlands) Mentos Racing					22	20					0
	(Switzerland) Martin Grab	(San Marino) Stile F Squadra Corse					21	23					0
	(Russia) Garry Kondakov	(Russia) Kaspersky Motorsport					25	24					0
	(Hong Kong) Wong Chong Yau Runme	(Switzerland) Kessel Racing	DNS	Ret									
Xtra Cup
1	(Italy) Davide Roda	(Italy) Oregon Team							**2**	2			33
1	(Italy) Mauro Casadei	(Germany) Attempto Racing	**17**	20									33
1	(Belgium) Jürgen Smet	(Spain) Monlau Competición									**17**	22	33
Pos.	Driver	Team	QR	MR	QR	MR	QR	MR	QR	MR	QR	MR	Points
Pos.	Driver	Team	MIS (Italy)		BRH (United Kingdom)		LEC (France)		SPA (Belgium)		CAT (Spain)		Points

Key
Colour	Result
Gold	Race winner
Silver	2nd place
Bronze	3rd place
Green	Points finish
Blue	Non-points finish
Blue	Non-classified finish (NC)
Purple	Did not finish (Ret)
Black	Disqualified (DSQ)
Black	Excluded (EX)
White	Did not start (DNS)
White	Race cancelled (C)
White	Withdrew (WD)
Blank	Did not participate

**Bold** – Pole
Italics – Fastest Lap

==== Iron Cup ====
Pos.	Driver	Team	MIS (Italy)		BRH (United Kingdom)		LEC (France)		SPA (Belgium)		CAT (Spain)		Points
Pos.	Driver	Team	QR	MR	QR	MR	QR	MR	QR	MR	QR	MR	Points
1	(Monaco) Martin Lanting	(Italy) AF Corse	16	4	**19**	8	**4**	7	6	7	**11**	21	124
2	(United States) Stephen Earle	(Switzerland) Kessel Racing	12	8	10	7	12	10	**9**	9	22	13	123
3	(Sweden) Jan Brunstedt	(Sweden) JB Motorsport	14	10	5	15	13	12	19	12	15	14	87
4	(Belgium) Louis-Philippe Soenen	(Belgium) Team WRT	18	16	14	12	15	17	15	19	19	20	68
5	(South Africa) Leon Price	(United Arab Emirates) Dragon Racing	22	18	11	11	20	22	17	20	23	DNS	44
6	(Germany) Klaus Dieter Frers	(Germany) Artega Rennsport					19	21	11	14	DNS	17	38
7	(Italy) Piergiuseppe Perazzini	(Italy) AF Corse	**2**	3									33
8	(France) Marc Sourd	(France) CMR					10	9					24
9	(United States) Michael Luzich	(Italy) AF Corse	23	21	17	14							18
10	(Italy) Augusto Perfetti	(Netherlands) Mentos Racing					22	20					8
Pos.	Driver	Team	QR	MR	QR	MR	QR	MR	QR	MR	QR	MR	Points
Pos.	Driver	Team	MIS (Italy)		BRH (United Kingdom)		LEC (France)		SPA (Belgium)		CAT (Spain)		Points

== See also ==
- 2016 Blancpain GT Series
