= 2027 GT2 European Series =

Seventh season of the GT2 European Series

The 2027 GT2 European Series Powered by Pirelli will mark the 7th season of the GT2 European Series. It is organised by the SRO Motorsports Group. The championship will be contested with SRO GT2 cars over five rounds, with two races per round, in support of the 2027 GT World Challenge Europe season. It is scheduled to start in April 2027 and finish in October.

== Calendar ==
Round	Circuit	Date	Supporting	Map
1	(France) Circuit Paul Ricard	16–18 April	GT World Challenge Europe Endurance Cup	2027 GT2 European Series is located in Europe
2	(Italy) Imola Circuit	21–23 May	GT World Challenge Europe Endurance Cup	2027 GT2 European Series is located in Europe
3	(Italy) Misano World Circuit	16–18 July	GT World Challenge Europe Sprint Cup	2027 GT2 European Series is located in Europe
4	(Germany) Nürburgring	27–29 August	GT World Challenge Europe Endurance Cup	2027 GT2 European Series is located in Europe
5	(Hungary) Hungaroring	1–3 October	GT World Challenge Europe Sprint Cup	2027 GT2 European Series is located in Europe

=== Calendar changes ===
The 2027 GT2 European Series calendar retains only one circuit from the 2026 season, Misano World Circuit. Due to renovations, Monza will not return to the calendar in 2027 and will be replaced by Imola, which makes its first appearance since 2022, in line with the GT World Challenge Europe season. Additionally, Circuit de Spa-Francorchamps, Circuit Zandvoort and the Algarve International Circuit will not return. Instead, the Nürburgring will host a round for the first time, while the Hungaroring will return for the first time since 2018.
