= Jens Reno Møller =

Danish racing driver (born 1971)

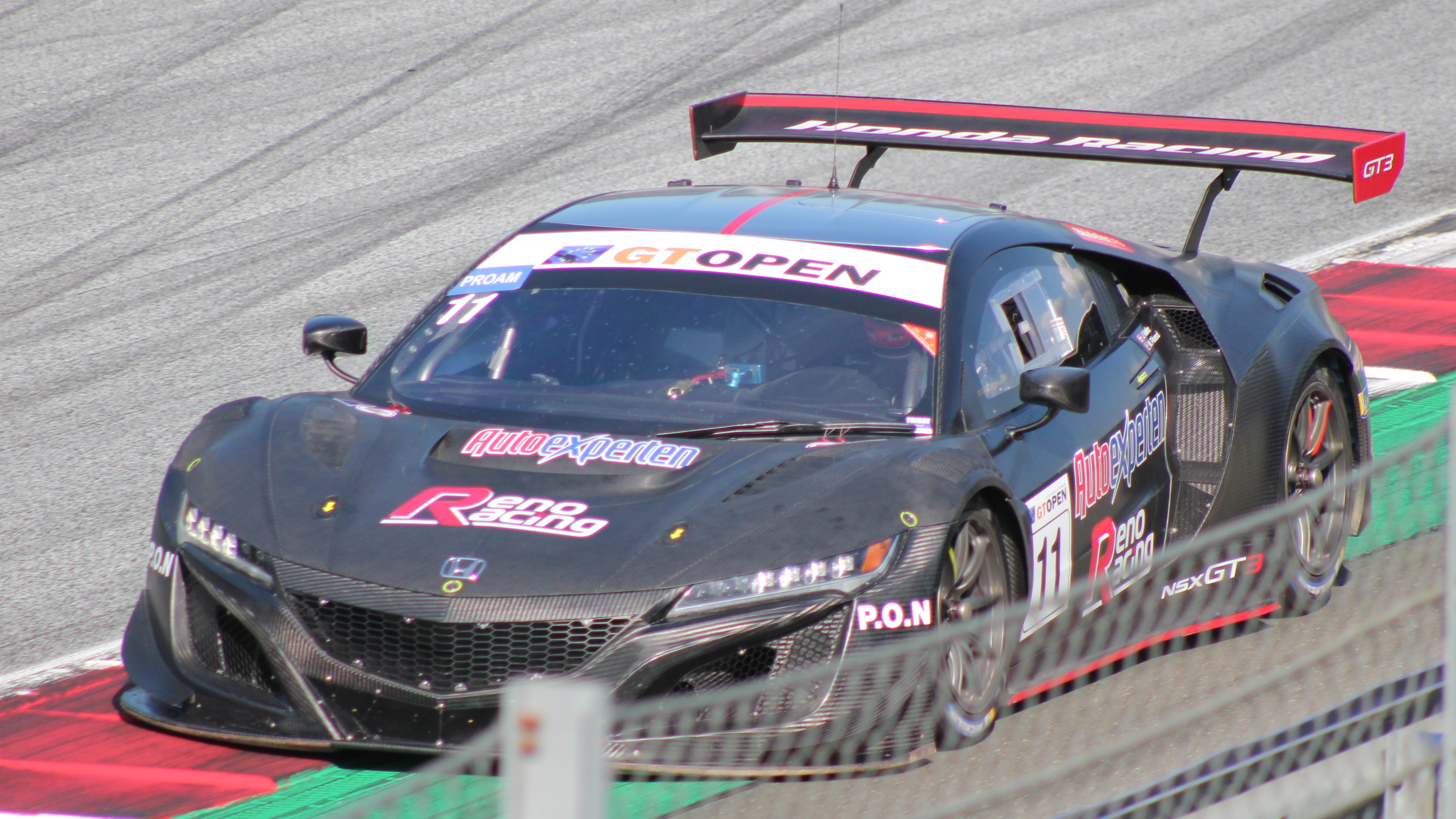
- Nationality: (Denmark) Danish
- Born: 14 January 1971 (age 55) Ikast, Denmark

Le Mans Cup career
- Debut season: 2023
- Current team: High Class Racing
- Categorisation: FIA Bronze
- Car number: 20
- Former teams: GMB Motorsport; High Class Racing
- Starts: 1
- Wins: 1
- Best finish: 1

Previous series
- 2016 2010 2007–08 2005–06 2002–10: Danish Supertourisme Turbo; Scandinavian Touring Car Cup; European Touring Car Cup; Le Mans Series; Danish Touringcar Championship; TCR International Series; Blancpain GT Sports Club; Le Mans Cup; European Le Mans Series

Championship titles
- 2009 2019: DTC – Independent Champion; Blancpain GT Sports Club – Overall

24 Hours of Le Mans career
- Years: 2004, 2006, 2023
- Teams: Lister Storm Racing
- Best finish: 9th (2004)

Jens Reno Møller (born 14 January 1971) is a Danish racing driver currently competing in the Le Mans Cup. Having previously competed in the Danish Touringcar Championship, European Touring Car Cup and Le Mans Series amongst others.

== Racing career ==
Møller began his career in 2002 in the Danish Touringcar Championship, finishing twentieth in the standings. He continued in the championship for many years, finishing seventh in the overall championship standings in 2009, as well as winning the independent championship that year. In the 2004 he made his 24 Hours of Le Mans debut with the Lister Storm Racing team, teaming up with fellow Danes John Nielsen and Casper Elgaard, they finished ninth in the LMP1 class. He returned in 2006 again racing with the Lister team, but this time teaming up with Brit Gavin Pickering and fellow Dane Nicolas Kiesa. The teams retired from the race after having completed 192 laps. In 2007 he entered the European Touring Car Cup, he finished seventh in Race 1 and retired in Race 2, finishing ninth in the championship standings. He returned in 2008, finishing sixth in both races and ending up fifth in the championship standings. In 2010, he took part in his last Danish Touringcar Championship season, as well as taking part in the Scandinavian Touring Car Cup. Møller finished fourth in the overall DTC standings taking two victories and winning the independent championship title. In the Scandinavian championship he finished fifthtenth in standings. After a six-year hiatus from racing Møller made his racing return in 2016, making his Danish Supertourisme Turbo debut. He finished eleventh in standings taking two podiums.

In March 2017, it was announced that Møller would race in the TCR International Series, driving a Honda Civic Type R TCR for his own Reno Racing team.

In 2019, Møller moved to the Blancpain GT Sports Club driving a JAS Motorsport Honda NSX GT3, where he would go on to win six of ten races and win the overall championship title.

In 2020–2021, Møller moved to the International GT Open series, where he won three Pro-AM Races and ended the season second overall.

In 2022, Møller moved to Le Mans Cup with GMB Motorsport, where he won three races and finished the season third overall.

In 2023, Møller competed in the European Le Mans Series with GMB Motorsport as their bronze classified driver, with a fifth-place finish being their best result.

In 2024, Møller is competing with High Class Racing in Le Mans Cup in the LMP3 Class.

== Racing record ==
=== 24 Hours of Le Mans results ===
Year	Team	Co-Drivers	Car	Class	Laps	Pos.	Class Pos.
2004	(United Kingdom) Lister Storm Racing	(Denmark) John Nielsen (Denmark) Casper Elgaard	Lister Storm LMP	LMP1	279	24th	9th
2006	(United Kingdom) Lister Storm Racing	(United Kingdom) Gavin Pickering (Denmark) Nicolas Kiesa	Lister Storm LMP Hybrid	LMP1	192	DNF	DNF
2023	(Denmark) GMB Motorsport	(Denmark) Gustav Birch (Denmark) Marco Sørensen	Aston Martin Vantage AMR	GTE; Am	21	DNF	DNF

=== Complete European Le Mans Series results ===
(key) (Races in bold indicate pole position) (Races in italics indicate fastest lap)

Year	Team	Class	Car	Engine	1	2	3	4	5	6	Rank	Points
2005	Lister Racing	LMP1	Lister Storm LMP	Chevrolet 6.0 L V8	SPA; Ret	MNZ	SIL; 7	NÜR	IST		23rd	2
2006	Lister Strom Racing	LMP1	Lister Storm LMP	Chevrolet 6.0 L V8	IST; 2	SPA; Ret	NÜR	DON; Ret	JAR		10th	8
2023	GMB Motorsport	LMGTE	Aston Martin Vantage AMR	Aston Martin 4.0 L Turbo V8	CAT; Ret	LEC; 12	ARA; 8	SPA; Ret	ALG; 8	ALG; 5	17th	18
2026	Vector Sport	LMP2 Pro-Am	Oreca 07	Gibson GK428 4.2 L V8	CAT; 6	LEC; 5	IMO; 1	SPA; 7	SIL; 8	ALG; 4	5th	65

=== Complete TCR International Series results ===
(key) (Races in bold indicate pole position) (Races in italics indicate fastest lap)

Year	Team	Car	1	2	3	4	5	6	7	8	9	10	11	12	13	14	15	16	17	18	19	20	DC	Points
2017	Reno Racing	Honda Civic Type R TCR	RIM; 1	RIM; 2	BHR; 1	BHR; 2	SPA; 1; 21	SPA; 2 Ret	MNZ; 1; 14	MNZ; 2; 13	SAL; 1; 8	SAL; 2; 9	HUN; 1; 14	HUN; 2; 3	OSC; 1; 17†	OSC; 2; 8	CHA; 1	CHA; 2	ZHE; 1	ZHE; 2	DUB; 1	DUB; 2	21st	25

^{†} Driver did not finish the race, but was classified as he completed over 90% of the race distance.

=== Complete TCR Europe Series results ===
(key) (Races in bold indicate pole position) (Races in italics indicate fastest lap)

Year	Team	Car	1	2	3	4	5	6	7	8	9	10	11	12	13	14	DC	Points
2018	Reno Racing	Honda Civic Type R TCR	LEC; 1; 9	LEC; 2; 7	ZAN; 1; 10	ZAN; 2; 7	SPA; 1; 18	SPA; 2; 13	HUN; 1; 6	HUN; 2; 16	ASS; 1; 13	ASS; 2; 9	MNZ; 1; 17	MNZ; 2 Ret	CAT; 1; 25	CAT; 2 Ret	19th	25
