= GT2 European Series =

Sports event

- GT2 European Series since 2025
- Category: Sports car racing
- Region: Europe
- Inaugural season: 2021
- Classes: Silver • Pro-Am • Masters
- Tyre suppliers: Pirelli
- Current champions: (France) Ethan Gialdini (Denmark) Mikkel Njor
- Teams' champion: (France) CMR
- Official website: www.gt2europeanseries.com

The GT2 European Series (formerly the GT Sports Club and Blancpain GT Sports Club), organized by SRO Motorsports Group, is an auto racing series for the SRO GT2 class of grand tourer cars, designed for amateur pay drivers in the FIA Bronze category. This target audience is also known in sportscar as "gentleman drivers".

The GT Sports Club Europe series was fully suspended in 2020 as a consequence of the global COVID-19 pandemic, and thus no GT2-class competition was held in 2020. The GT2 series was re-established in a significantly different format in 2021, adding a Pro-Am style subclass and Fanatec as the title sponsor; this Fanatec GT2 European Series continued in 2022.

The 2021-onwards GT2 series runs in support of the GT World Challenge Europe weekends and includes Friday practice and qualifying with one race each on Saturday and Sunday.

== History ==
The inaugural Blancpain GT Sports Club series in 2015 was aimed at amateur pay drivers, with competition limited to drivers of a grade similar to the FIA Bronze category at the time, and with cars homologated in a number of ways and open to running older chassis. By the end of 2019 it was possible to use any of: FIA GT3 for that season, re-homologated cars from earlier GT3 generations, RACB G3 cars, GTE-spec cars, and Renault Sport Trophy cars, all competing in a single class through a Balance of Performance process and additional Cup Trophys based on driver age or car subclass. In the early seasons Bronze included subcategories Titanium for drivers aged 50-59 and Iron for drivers over 60 years of age; these subcategories are not in use in 2022.

The Sports Club raceday design was originally focused on running lunchtime-to-lunchtime to ease weekend travel and encourage "arrive and drive" entries, with free practice and qualifying sessions on day one, followed by qualifying and main races the following day.

GT Sports Club Europe was suspended in 2020 as a consequence of the global COVID-19 pandemic. The "GT Sports Club" concept was relaunched in 2021 as an umbrella covering a championship built on an also new GT2 class; a sister GT3-only championship with a similar approach as before to running multiple generations of GT3 together; and a non-competitive "GT1 Sports Club" aimed at bringing road-going supercars on track together. These series now support the GT World Challenge Europe calendar.

== Champions ==
Year	Overall	Titanium Cup	Iron Cup	Xtra Cup	Cup Challenge (2015) Cup (2017–)
2015	(Italy) Max Bianchi	Not held	(Monaco) Martin Lanting	Not held	(Hong Kong) Wong Chong Yau Runme
2016	(Poland) Michał Broniszewski	Not held	(Monaco) Martin Lanting	(Italy) Mauro Casadei (Italy) Davide Roda (Belgium) Jürgen Smet	Not held
2017	(France) Anthony Pons	Not held	(United States) Stephen Earle	(Sri Lanka) Dilantha Malagamuwa	(United States) Howard Blank
2018	(Saudi Arabia) Karim Ojjeh	(Saudi Arabia) Karim Ojjeh	(United States) Stephen Earle	Not held	Not awarded
2019	(Denmark) Jens Reno Møller	(Germany) Coach McKansy	(United States) Stephen Earle	Not held	Not awarded
GT2 European Series
	Silver	Pro-Am Cup	Am Cup		
2021	Not held	(Denmark) Anders Fjordbach (United States) Mark Patterson	(Switzerland) Christoph Ulrich		
2022	Not held	(Belgium) Nicolas Saelens (Belgium) Stienes Longin	(Luxembourg) Henry Hassid		
2023	Not held	(France) Henry Hassid (France) Anthony Beltoise	(Czech Republic) Jan Krabec		
2024	Not held	(Switzerland) Martin Koch (Austria) Reinhard Kofler	(Monaco) Philippe Prette		
2025	Not held	(Czech Republic) Bronek Formanek (Slovakia) Stefan Rosina	(Italy) Philippe Prette		

== Circuits ==
- **Bold** denotes a circuit will be used in the 2026 season.
- **Italic** denotes a future circuit will be used in the 2027 season.
- (Portugal) **Algarve International Circuit** (2015, 2023, 2026)
- (United Kingdom) Brands Hatch (2016)
- (Spain) Circuit de Barcelona-Catalunya (2015–2019, 2021, 2024–2025)
- (Belgium) **Circuit de Spa-Francorchamps** (2016–2019, 2021–2022, 2024–2026)
- (France) **Circuit Paul Ricard** (2015–2019, 2021–2025, 2027)
- (Spain) Circuit Ricardo Tormo (2022–2023, 2025)
- (Netherlands) **Circuit Zandvoort** (2022–2023, 2025–2026)
- (France) Dijon-Prenois (2023)
- (Germany) Hockenheimring (2021, 2024)
- (Hungary) **Hungaroring** (2017–2018, 2027)
- (Italy) **Imola Circuit** (2022, 2027)
- (Italy) **Misano World Circuit** (2015–2019, 2021–2022, 2024–present)
- (Italy) **Monza Circuit** (2018–2019, 2021, 2023–2024, 2026)
- (Germany) **Nürburgring** (2027)
- (Austria) Red Bull Ring (2022–2023)
- (United Kingdom) Silverstone Circuit (2017)
