= 2024 GT2 European Series =

Fourth season of the GT2 European Series

The 2024 Fanatec GT2 European Series was the fourth season of the GT2 European Series. The season started on 5 April at Circuit Paul Ricard and ended on 13 October at Circuit de Barcelona-Catalunya.

== Calendar ==
For 2024 the opening round of the season was moved to Circuit Paul Ricard, which had previously hosted the season finale from 2021 to 2023. The only other track to remain on the calendar from the 2023 season was Monza, having been moved from the season opener to September. This season also marks the return to Circuit de Spa-Francorchamps, Misano and Hockenheim, which had been absent from the calendar in 2023. The season finale marks the series' first appearance at Circuit de Barcelona-Catalunya.

Round	Circuit	Date	Supporting
1	Circuit Paul Ricard, Le Castellet, France	5–6 April	GT World Challenge Europe Endurance Cup
2	Misano World Circuit Marco Simoncelli, Misano Adriatico, Italy	17–19 May	GT World Challenge Europe Sprint Cup
3	Circuit de Spa-Francorchamps, Stavelot, Belgium	27–29 June	GT World Challenge Europe Endurance Cup
4	Hockenheimring, Hockenheim, Germany	19–21 July	GT World Challenge Europe Sprint Cup
5	Autodromo Nazionale Monza, Monza, Italy	20–22 September	GT World Challenge Europe Endurance Cup
6	Circuit de Barcelona-Catalunya, Montmeló, Spain	11–13 October	GT World Challenge Europe Sprint Cup

== Entry list ==
Team	Car	No.	Drivers	Class	Iron	Rounds
(Italy) LP Racing	Maserati MC20 GT2	1	(Switzerland) Leonardo Gorini	PA		All
(Italy) LP Racing	Maserati MC20 GT2	1	(Italy) Carlo Tamburini	PA		All
(Italy) LP Racing	Maserati MC20 GT2	2	(Monaco) Philippe Prette	Am		All
(Italy) LP Racing	Audi R8 LMS GT2	18	(Germany) Michael Doppelmayr	PA	Iron	2–4
(Italy) LP Racing	Audi R8 LMS GT2	18	(Germany) Pierre Kaffer	PA	Iron	2–4
(Italy) LP Racing	Audi R8 LMS GT2	18	(France) Philippe Chatelet	PA		5
(Italy) LP Racing	Audi R8 LMS GT2	18	(Germany) Pierre Kaffer	PA		5
(Italy) LP Racing	Audi R8 LMS GT2	88	(France) Stéphane Ratel	Am		1
(Italy) LP Racing	Audi R8 LMS GT2	88	(Italy) Stefano Costantini	PA		3
(Italy) LP Racing	Audi R8 LMS GT2	88	(Italy) Alfio Spina	PA		3, 6
(Italy) LP Racing	Audi R8 LMS GT2	88	(Slovakia) Štefan Rosina	PA		4–5
(Italy) LP Racing	Audi R8 LMS GT2	88	(France) Stéphane Ratel	PA		4
(Italy) LP Racing	Audi R8 LMS GT2	88	(France) Gianluca Giorgi	PA		5–6
(Belgium) BDR Compétition by Group Prom	Lamborghini Huracán Super Trofeo Evo2	7	(Mexico) Alfredo Hernández Ortega	Am		3
(Denmark) RacingLab	KTM X-Bow GT2	10	(Denmark) Ronnie Bremer	PA		1
(Denmark) RacingLab	KTM X-Bow GT2	10	(Denmark) Jacob Mathiassen	PA		1
(Austria) KTM True Racing	KTM X-Bow GT2	16	(Austria) Klaus Angerhofer	Am	Iron	All
(Austria) KTM True Racing	KTM X-Bow GT2	16	(Austria) Sedhi Sarmini	Am	Iron	All
(Austria) KTM True Racing	KTM X-Bow GT2	17	(Austria) Laura Krahaimer	PA		All
(Austria) KTM True Racing	KTM X-Bow GT2	17	(Austria) Hubert Trunkenpolz	PA		1–2, 4–6
(France) TFT Racing	Maserati MC20 GT2	24	(France) Alexandre Leroy	Am		All
(France) Akkodis ASP Team	Mercedes-AMG GT2	53	(France) Christophe Bourret	Am	Iron	1–4
(France) Akkodis ASP Team	Mercedes-AMG GT2	53	(France) Pascal Gibon	Am	Iron	1–4
(France) Akkodis ASP Team	Mercedes-AMG GT2	53	(France) Pascal Gibon	Am		5–6
(France) Akkodis ASP Team	Mercedes-AMG GT2	61	(Switzerland) Benjamin Ricci	PA		1, 3–6
(France) Akkodis ASP Team	Mercedes-AMG GT2	61	(Monaco) Mauro Ricci	PA		1, 3–6
(France) Akkodis ASP Team	Mercedes-AMG GT2	61	(France) Ludovic Badey	PA	Iron	2
(France) Akkodis ASP Team	Mercedes-AMG GT2	61	(Monaco) Mauro Ricci	PA	Iron	2
(France) Akkodis ASP Team	Mercedes-AMG GT2	87	(France) Jean-Luc Beaubelique	Am	Iron	All
(France) Akkodis ASP Team	Mercedes-AMG GT2	87	(France) Gilles Vannelet	Am	Iron	All
(France) Team CMR	Ginetta G56 GTX	56	(United Kingdom) Lawrence Tomlinson	Am		3
(Germany) Attempto Racing	Audi R8 LMS GT2	66	(Italy) Lorenzo Patrese	PA		3
(Germany) Attempto Racing	Audi R8 LMS GT2	66	Andrey Mukovoz	PA		3
(Italy) Dinamic Motorsport	Maserati MC20 GT2	67	(Switzerland) Mauro Calamia	PA		5–6
(Italy) Dinamic Motorsport	Maserati MC20 GT2	67	(Italy) Roberto Pampanini	PA		5–6
(Germany) Proton Competition	Porsche 911 GT2 RS Clubsport	77	(Germany) Patrick Dinkeldein	Am		1
(Austria) Razoon – More Than Racing	KTM X-Bow GT2	80	(Denmark) Thomas Andersen	PA		All
(Austria) Razoon – More Than Racing	KTM X-Bow GT2	80	(Denmark) Simon Birch	PA		All
(Austria) Razoon – More Than Racing	KTM X-Bow GT2	90	(Austria) Denis Liebl	Am		1–4
(Austria) Razoon – More Than Racing	KTM X-Bow GT2	90	(Austria) Dominik Olbert	Am		1–4, 6
(Austria) Razoon – More Than Racing	KTM X-Bow GT2	90	(Poland) Arthur Chwist	Am		6
(Luxembourg) Bosi Race Tech	Mercedes-AMG GT2	81	(Netherlands) Wim de Pundert	PA		6
(Luxembourg) Bosi Race Tech	Mercedes-AMG GT2	81	(Germany) Bernt Schneider	PA		6
(Czech Republic) RTR Projects	KTM X-Bow GT2	89	(Czech Republic) Jan Krabec	PA		1–2, 5
(Czech Republic) RTR Projects	KTM X-Bow GT2	89	(Slovakia) Matej Homola	PA		1, 3, 6
(Czech Republic) RTR Projects	KTM X-Bow GT2	89	(Czech Republic) Erik Janiš	PA		2
(Czech Republic) RTR Projects	KTM X-Bow GT2	89	(Czech Republic) Petr Lisa	PA		3
(Czech Republic) RTR Projects	KTM X-Bow GT2	89	(Czech Republic) Viktor Mraz	PA		5
(Czech Republic) RTR Projects	KTM X-Bow GT2	89	(Germany) Lennart Marioneck	PA		6
(Belgium) Motorsport 98	Mercedes-AMG GT2	98	(Belgium) Eric De Doncker	PA		1–4
(Belgium) Motorsport 98	Mercedes-AMG GT2	98	(Netherlands) Loris Hezemans	PA		1–4
(Austria) MZR Motorsportzentrum Ried	KTM X-Bow GT2	812	(Switzerland) Martin Koch	PA		1–4, 6
(Austria) MZR Motorsportzentrum Ried	KTM X-Bow GT2	812	(Austria) Reinhard Kofler	PA		1–4, 6
(Spain) NM Racing Team	Mercedes-AMG GT2	888	(France) Stéphane Perrin	Am	Iron	1–5
(Spain) NM Racing Team	Mercedes-AMG GT2	888	(Germany) Jörg Viebahn	Am	Iron	1–6
(Spain) NM Racing Team	Mercedes-AMG GT2	888	(United States) Andy Cantu	Am		6
Entrylists:

Icon	Class
PA	Pro-Am Cup
Am	Am Cup
INV	Invitational

== Race results ==
Bold indicates overall winner

Round		Circuit	Pole position	Pro-Am Winners	Am Winners	Report
1	R1	(France) Paul Ricard	(Italy) No. 1 LP Racing	**(Italy) No. 1 LP Racing**	(France) No. 87 Akkodis ASP Team	Report
1	R1	(France) Paul Ricard	(Switzerland) Leonardo Gorini (Italy) Carlo Tamburini	**(Switzerland) Leonardo Gorini** **(Italy) Carlo Tamburini**	(France) Jean-Luc Beaubelique (France) Gilles Vannelet	Report
1	R2	(France) Paul Ricard	(Italy) No. 1 LP Racing	**(Czech Republic) No. 89 RTR Projects**	(Italy) No. 2 LP Racing	Report
1	R2	(France) Paul Ricard	(Switzerland) Leonardo Gorini (Italy) Carlo Tamburini	**(Slovakia) Matej Homola** **(Czech Republic) Jan Krabec**	(Monaco) Philippe Prette	Report
2	R1	(Italy) Misano	(Italy) No. 2 LP Racing	**(Italy) No. 1 LP Racing**	(Italy) No. 2 LP Racing	Report
2	R1	(Italy) Misano	(Monaco) Philippe Prette	**(Switzerland) Leonardo Gorini** **(Italy) Carlo Tamburini**	(Monaco) Philippe Prette	Report
2	R2	(Italy) Misano	(Italy) No. 1 LP Racing	**(Austria) No. 812 MZR Motorsportzentrum Ried**	(France) No. 24 TFT Racing	Report
2	R2	(Italy) Misano	(Switzerland) Leonardo Gorini (Italy) Carlo Tamburini	**(Switzerland) Martin Koch** **(Austria) Reinhard Kofler**	(France) Alexandre Leroy	Report
3	R1	(Belgium) Spa	(France) No. 24 TFT Racing	**(Italy) No. 1 LP Racing**	(Italy) No. 2 LP Racing	Report
3	R1	(Belgium) Spa	(France) Alexandre Leroy	**(Switzerland) Leonardo Gorini** **(Italy) Carlo Tamburini**	(Monaco) Philippe Prette	Report
3	R2	(Belgium) Spa	(Italy) No. 18 LP Racing	**(Austria) No. 812 MZR Motorsportzentrum Ried**	(France) No. 87 Akkodis ASP Team	Report
3	R2	(Belgium) Spa	(Germany) Michael Doppelmayr (Germany) Pierre Kaffer	**(Switzerland) Martin Koch** **(Austria) Reinhard Kofler**	(France) Jean-Luc Beaubelique (France) Gilles Vannelet	Report
4	R1	(Germany) Hockenheimring	(Italy) No. 2 LP Racing	**(Austria) No. 812 MZR Motorsportzentrum Ried**	(Italy) No. 2 LP Racing	Report
4	R1	(Germany) Hockenheimring	(Monaco) Philippe Prette	**(Switzerland) Martin Koch** **(Austria) Reinhard Kofler**	(Monaco) Philippe Prette	Report
4	R2	(Germany) Hockenheimring	(Italy) No. 18 LP Racing	**(Austria) No. 812 MZR Motorsportzentrum Ried**	(France) No. 53 Akkodis ASP Team	Report
4	R2	(Germany) Hockenheimring	(Germany) Michael Doppelmayr (Germany) Pierre Kaffer	**(Switzerland) Martin Koch** **(Austria) Reinhard Kofler**	(France) Christophe Bourret (France) Pascal Gibon	Report
5	R1	(Italy) Monza	(France) No. 87 Akkodis ASP Team	**(Italy) No. 1 LP Racing**	(France) No. 24 TFT Racing	Report
5	R1	(Italy) Monza	(France) Jean-Luc Beaubelique (France) Gilles Vannelet	**(Switzerland) Leonardo Gorini** **(Italy) Carlo Tamburini**	(France) Alexandre Leroy	Report
5	R2	(Italy) Monza	(Austria) No. 812 MZR Motorsportzentrum Ried	**(Austria) No. 812 MZR Motorsportzentrum Ried**	(France) No. 87 Akkodis ASP Team	Report
5	R2	(Italy) Monza	(Switzerland) Martin Koch (Austria) Reinhard Kofler	**(Switzerland) Martin Koch** **(Austria) Reinhard Kofler**	(France) Jean-Luc Beaubelique (France) Gilles Vannelet	Report
6	R1	(Spain) Barcelona	(France) No. 87 Akkodis ASP Team	**(Italy) No. 67 Dinamic Motorsport**	(France) No. 87 Akkodis ASP Team	Report
6	R1	(Spain) Barcelona	(France) Jean-Luc Beaubelique (France) Gilles Vannelet	**(Switzerland) Mauro Calamia** **(Italy) Roberto Pampanini**	(France) Jean-Luc Beaubelique (France) Gilles Vannelet	Report
6	R2	(Spain) Barcelona	(Italy) No. 1 LP Racing	**(Spain) No. 888 NM Racing Team**	(Italy) No. 2 LP Racing	Report
6	R2	(Spain) Barcelona	(Switzerland) Leonardo Gorini (Italy) Carlo Tamburini	**(Germany) Jörg Viebahn** **(United States) Andy Cantu**	(Monaco) Philippe Prette	Report

== Championship standings ==
Scoring system

Championship points are awarded for the first ten positions in each race. Entries are required to complete 75% of the winning car's race distance in order to be classified and earn points.

Position	1st	2nd	3rd	4th	5th	6th	7th	8th	9th	10th	Pole
Points	25	18	15	12	10	8	6	4	2	1	1

=== Drivers' championships ===
==== Pro-Am Drivers' Championship ====
Pos.	Driver	Team	LEC (France)		MIS (Italy)		SPA (Belgium)		HOC (Germany)		MNZ (Italy)		BAR (Spain)		Points
1	(Switzerland) Martin Koch (Austria) Reinhard Kofler	(Austria) MZR Motorsportzentrum Ried	2	2	2	1	4	1	1^{P}	1	3^{P}	1^{P}	5	3	237
2	(Switzerland) Leonardo Gorini (Italy) Carlo Tamburini	(Italy) LP Racing	1^{P}	6^{P}	1^{P}	2^{P}	1^{P}	6	Ret	4	1	2	3	4^{P}	197
3	(Denmark) Thomas Andersen (Denmark) Simon Birch	(Austria) Razoon – More Than Racing	5	3	6	3	2	2	4	2	Ret	5	6	6	140
4	(Slovakia) Matej Homola	(Czech Republic) RTR Projects	3	1			Ret	3					3^{P}	3	92
5	(Belgium) Eric De Doncker (Netherlands) Loris Hezemans	(Belgium) Motorsport 98	6	5	3	4	4	4	2	Ret					87
6	(Austria) Hubert Trunkenpolz (Austria) Laura Krahaimer	(Austria) KTM True Racing	8	Ret	5	5					2	6	7	8	60
7	(Germany) Pierre Kaffer	(Italy) LP Racing			4	6	5	5^{P}	Ret	Ret^{P}	Ret	3			57
8	(Germany) Jörg Viebahn	(Spain) NM Racing Team											1	1	50
9	(Germany) Michael Doppelmayr	(Italy) LP Racing			4	6	5	5^{P}	Ret	DNS^{P}					42
10	(Czech Republic) Jan Krabec	(Czech Republic) RTR Projects	3	1	DNS	Ret									40
11	(Switzerland) Benjamin Ricci (Switzerland) Mauro Ricci	(France) Akkodis ASP Team	7	7	Ret	DNS			Ret	5	Ret	4	Ret	7	40
12	(France) Stéphane Ratel (Slovakia) Štefan Rosina	(Italy) LP Racing							3	3					30
13	(Italy) Alfio Andrea Spina	(Italy) LP Racing					DNS	7					4	5	28
14	(Denmark) Ronnie Bremer (Denmark) Jacob Mathiassen	(Denmark) RacingLab	4	4											24
15	(Czech Republic) Petr Lisa	(Czech Republic) RTR Projects					Ret	3							15
16	(Italy) Stefano Costantini	(Italy) LP Racing					Ret	7							6
Pos.	Driver	Team	LEC (France)		MIS (Italy)		SPA (Belgium)		HOC (Germany)		MNZ (Italy)		BAR (Spain)		Points

Colour	Result
Gold	Winner
Silver	Second place
Bronze	Third place
Green	Points classification
Blue	Non-points classification
Blue	Non-classified finish (NC)
Purple	Retired, not classified (Ret)
Red	Did not qualify (DNQ)
Red	Did not pre-qualify (DNPQ)
Black	Disqualified (DSQ)
White	Did not start (DNS)
White	Withdrew (WD)
White	Race cancelled (C)
Blank	Did not practice (DNP)
Blank	Did not arrive (DNA)
Blank	Excluded (EX)

- ^{P} - Pole position

==== Am Drivers' Championship ====
Pos.	Driver	Team	LEC (France)		MIS (Italy)		SPA (Belgium)		HOC (Germany)		MNZ (Italy)		BAR (Spain)		Points
1	(Monaco) Philippe Prette	(Italy) LP Racing	3^{P}	1	1^{P}	DNS^{P}	1	8^{P}	1^{P}	3^{P}	2	4^{P}	4	1^{P}	209
2	(France) Jean-Luc Beaubelique (France) Gilles Vannelet	(France) Akkodis ASP Team	1	2^{P}	2	DNS	3	1	2	1	5^{P}	1	1^{P}	Ret	207
3	(France) Alexandre Leroy	(France) TFT Racing	2	3	3	1	2^{P}	3	5	5	1	5	2	2	198
4	(France) Christophe Bourret (France) Pascal Gibon	(France) Akkodis ASP Team	5	4	6	4	9	2	6	2	4	2	3	DNS	133
5	(Austria) Klaus Angerhofer (Austria) Sedhi Sarmini	(Austria) KTM True Racing	Ret	5	5	3	7	6	4	4	3	3	5	3	128
6	(France) Stéphane Perrin (Germany) Jörg Viebahn	(Spain) NM Racing Team	4	8	4	DNS	4	7	3	6	DNS				69
7	(Austria) Dominik Olbert	(Austria) Razoon – More Than Racing	Ret	7	7	2	8	Ret					6	DSQ	42
8	(Austria) Denis Liebl	(Austria) Razoon – More Than Racing	Ret	7	7	2	8	Ret							34
9	(Mexico) Alfredo Hernández Ortega	(Belgium) BDR Compétition by Group Prom					6	4							20
10	(United Kingdom) Lawrence Tomlinson	(France) Team CMR					5	5							20
11	(Germany) Patrick Dinkeldein	(Germany) Proton Competition	7	6											14
12	(France) Stéphane Ratel	(Italy) LP Racing	6	Ret											8
Pos.	Driver	Team	LEC (France)		MIS (Italy)		SPA (Belgium)		HOC (Germany)		MNZ (Italy)		BAR (Spain)		Points

Notes:

- † – Entry did not finish the race but was classified, as it completed more than 75% of the race distance.
