= 2010 Danish Touringcar Championship season =

Danish motorsport competition

2010 Danish Touringcar Championship

Seasons
- ← 2009 2011 (Scandinavia) →

The 2010 Danish Touringcar Championship season was the 11th and last Danish Touringcar Championship (DTC) season. Four of the race weekends will be held together with the Swedish Touring Car Championship and the results from these races will also count towards the Scandinavian Touring Car Cup. From 2011, the new Scandinavian Touring Car Championship will replace both the Swedish and the Danish Touring Car Championships.

In 2012 the series was succeeded by the Danish Thundersport Championship, using the Camaro Cup cars as a basis.

== Teams and drivers ==
The official entry list for the 2010 DTC season was released on April 13.

Team	Car	No.	Drivers	Rounds
(Sweden) Flash Engineering	BMW 320si	2	(Sweden) Thed Björk	1, 3, 6–7
(Sweden) Flash Engineering	BMW 320si	106	(Sweden) Jan Nilsson	1, 3, 6–7
(Denmark) Hartmann Honda Racing	Honda Accord Euro R	3	(Denmark) Tom Pedersen	2
(Denmark) Hartmann Honda Racing	Honda Accord Euro R	3	(United Kingdom) James Thompson	5–6
(Denmark) Hartmann Honda Racing	Honda Accord Euro R	16	(Sweden) Tomas Engström	1
(Denmark) Hartmann Honda Racing	Honda Accord Euro R	16	(Austria) Wolfgang Treml	5
(Denmark) Team Bygma	SEAT León	6	(Denmark) Jason Watt	All
(Denmark) JM Racing	BMW 320i E46	7	(Denmark) Michael Outzen	8
(Denmark) KC Motorsport	BMW 320i E46	8	(Denmark) Kim Morgan Jensen	1–2, 4, 6, 8
(Denmark) Carlsen Motorsport	Peugeot 407	9	(Denmark) Michael Carlsen	1, 3, 6–8
(Denmark) Team FDM	SEAT León	11	(Denmark) Jens Reno Møller	1–2, 4–8
(Denmark) Team FDM	SEAT León	12	(Denmark) Kim Holmgaard	1–2, 4, 6, 8
(Denmark) Team Bauhaus (Denmark) Bauhaus Telesikring	Chevrolet Lacetti	20	(Denmark) Jesper Sylvest	8
(Denmark) Team Bauhaus (Denmark) Bauhaus Telesikring	Chevrolet Lacetti	23	(Denmark) Jan Magnussen	3, 6–7
(Denmark) Team Bauhaus (Denmark) Bauhaus Telesikring	BMW 320si	23	(Denmark) Jan Magnussen	1–2
(Denmark) Team Bauhaus (Denmark) Bauhaus Telesikring	BMW 320si	87	(Denmark) Casper Elgaard	1–2
(Denmark) Alternative Engineering (Denmark) Team Telesikring	BMW 320si	22	(Denmark) Robert Schlünssen	1, 3–8
(Denmark) Alternative Engineering (Denmark) Team Telesikring	BMW 320si	87	(Denmark) Casper Elgaard	3–8
(Denmark) Team Niels Christiansen	Toyota Corolla T-Sport	24	(Denmark) Niels Christiansen	2, 4–6, 8

== Race calendar and results ==
The calendar for the 2010 season was published in December 2009. As a first step towards the planned merger with the Swedish Touring Car Championship, four of the races will be held together with STCC.

Round		Circuit	Date	Pole position	Fastest lap	Winning driver	Winning team
1	R1	(Denmark) Jyllands-Ringen *	25 April	(Sweden) Thed Björk	(Denmark) Jan Magnussen	(Denmark) Jan Magnussen	(Denmark) Bauhaus Telesikring
1	R2	(Denmark) Jyllands-Ringen *	25 April		(Denmark) Jens Reno Møller	(Denmark) Robert Schlünssen	(Denmark) Alternative Engineering
2	R3	(Denmark) Padborg Park	16 May	(Denmark) Jan Magnussen	(Denmark) Jan Magnussen	(Denmark) Jan Magnussen	(Denmark) Bauhaus Telesikring
2	R4	(Denmark) Padborg Park	16 May		(Denmark) Jan Magnussen	(Denmark) Tom Pedersen	(Denmark) Hartmann Honda Racing
3	R5	(Sweden) Göteborg City Race *	5 June	(Denmark) Jan Magnussen	(Denmark) Jan Magnussen	(Denmark) Robert Schlünssen	(Denmark) Alternative Engineering
3	R6	(Sweden) Göteborg City Race *	5 June		(Denmark) Robert Schlünssen	(Denmark) Robert Schlünssen	(Denmark) Alternative Engineering
4	R7	(Denmark) Jyllands-Ringen	20 June	(Denmark) Jens Reno Møller	(Denmark) Jens Reno Møller	(Denmark) Jens Reno Møller	(Denmark) Team FDM
4	R8	(Denmark) Jyllands-Ringen	20 June		(Denmark) Jens Reno Møller	(Denmark) Jason Watt	(Denmark) Team Bygma
5	R9	(Denmark) Ring Djursland	15 August	(United Kingdom) James Thompson	(United Kingdom) James Thompson	(United Kingdom) James Thompson	(Denmark) Hartmann Honda Racing
5	R10	(Denmark) Ring Djursland	15 August		(Denmark) Casper Elgaard	(Denmark) Casper Elgaard	(Denmark) Team Telesikring
6	R11	(Denmark) Jyllands-Ringen *	5 September	(United Kingdom) James Thompson	(Denmark) Jens Reno Møller	(United Kingdom) James Thompson	(Denmark) Hartmann Honda Racing
6	R12	(Denmark) Jyllands-Ringen *	5 September		(Sweden) Thed Björk	(Sweden) Thed Björk	(Sweden) Flash Engineering
7	R13	(Sweden) Ring Knutstorp *	18 September	(Sweden) Thed Björk	(Denmark) Jan Magnussen	(Denmark) Jan Magnussen	(Denmark) Team Bauhaus
7	R14	(Sweden) Ring Knutstorp *	18 September		(Sweden) Thed Björk	(Sweden) Thed Björk	(Sweden) Flash Engineering
8	R15	(Denmark) Jyllands-Ringen	10 October	(Denmark) Casper Elgaard	(Denmark) Jason Watt	(Denmark) Jason Watt	(Denmark) Team Bygma
8	R16	(Denmark) Jyllands-Ringen	10 October		none	(Denmark) Jens Reno Møller	(Denmark) Team FDM

*Joint STCC and DTC races. In the joint STCC and DTC races, only the highest placed DTC driver/team is listed

== Championship standings ==
=== Drivers' Championship ===
Pos.	Driver	JYL (Denmark)		PAD (Denmark)		GÖT (Sweden)		JYL (Denmark)		DJU (Denmark)		JYL (Denmark)		KNU (Sweden)		JYL (Denmark)		Pts
1	(Denmark) Casper Elgaard	10	6	2	3	5	4	3	2	2	1	2	3	Ret	6	**2**	3	201,5
2	(Denmark) Robert Schlünssen	3	1			1	1	4	3	3	Ret	4	2	4	7	3	6	190
3	(Denmark) Jason Watt	4	3	4	6	3	Ret	2	1	4	Ret	3	4	Ret	3	1	5	184,5
4	(Denmark) Jens Reno Møller	2	2	3	4			**1**	4	Ret	2	9	7	3	4	6	1	176
5	(Denmark) Jan Magnussen	1	4	**1**	2	**2**	Ret					Ret	6	1	2			134
6	(Sweden) Thed Björk	5	5			DNS	5					5	1	**2**	1			101
7	(Denmark) Michael Carlsen	8	8			4	3					7	Ret	5	5	5	8	90
8	(Denmark) Kim Holmgaard	9	9	Ret	5			5	5			8	8			Ret	9	66
9	(Denmark) Kim Morgan Jensen	Ret	10	6	7			Ret	6			Ret	9			8	2	58
10	(United Kingdom) James Thompson									**1**	Ret	**1**	5					51
11	(Sweden) Jan Nilsson	6	Ret			Ret	2					6	Ret	Ret	8			45
12	(Denmark) Niels Christiansen			5	8			6	7	Ret	Ret	Ret	Ret			Ret	7	42,5
13	(Austria) Wolfgang Treml									5	3							26
14	(Denmark) Tom Pedersen			Ret	1													20
15	(Denmark) Michael Outzen															4	4	19,5
16	(Sweden) Tomas Engström	7	7															18
17	(Denmark) Jesper Sylvest															7	Ret	9
Pos.	Driver	JYL (Denmark)		PAD (Denmark)		GÖT (Sweden)		JYL (Denmark)		DJU (Denmark)		JYL (Denmark)		KNU (Sweden)		JYL (Denmark)		Pts

Colour	Result
Gold	Winner
Silver	Second place
Bronze	Third place
Green	Points classification
Blue	Non-points classification
Blue	Non-classified finish (NC)
Purple	Retired, not classified (Ret)
Red	Did not qualify (DNQ)
Red	Did not pre-qualify (DNPQ)
Black	Disqualified (DSQ)
White	Did not start (DNS)
White	Withdrew (WD)
White	Race cancelled (C)
Blank	Did not practice (DNP)
Blank	Did not arrive (DNA)
Blank	Excluded (EX)

**Bold** – Pole
Italics – Fastest Lap

† — Drivers did not finish the race, but were classified as they completed over 90% of the race distance.

=== Teams' Championship ===
Pos.	Team	JYL (Denmark)		PAD (Denmark)		GÖT (Sweden)		JYL (Denmark)		DJU (Denmark)		JYL (Denmark)		KNU (Sweden)		JYL (Denmark)		Pts
1	(Denmark) Alternative Engineering (Denmark) Team Telesikring	3	1	2	3	1	1	3	2	2	1	2	2	4	6	2	3	349,5
2	(Denmark) Team FDM	2	2	3	4			1	4	Ret	2	8	7	3	4	6	1	244,5
3	(Denmark) Team Bauhaus	1	4	1	2	2	Ret					Ret	6	1	2	7	Ret	194
4	(Denmark) Team Bygma	4	3	4	6	3	Ret	2	1	4	Ret	3	4	Ret	3	1	5	184,5
5	(Sweden) Flash Engineering	5	5			Ret	2					5	1	2	1			146
6	(Denmark) Carlsen Motorsport	8	8			4	3					7	Ret	5	5	5	8	90
7	(Denmark) Hartmann Honda Racing	7	7	Ret	1					1	3	1	5					89
8	(Denmark) KC Motorsport	Ret	10	6	7			Ret	6			Ret	9			8	2	58,5
9	(Denmark) Team Niels Christiansen			5	8			6	7	Ret	Ret	Ret	Ret			Ret	7	42,5
10	(Denmark) JM Racing															4	4	19,5
Pos.	Team	JYL (Denmark)		PAD (Denmark)		GÖT (Sweden)		JYL (Denmark)		DJU (Denmark)		JYL (Denmark)		KNU (Sweden)		JYL (Denmark)		Pts

Colour	Result
Gold	Winner
Silver	Second place
Bronze	Third place
Green	Points classification
Blue	Non-points classification
Blue	Non-classified finish (NC)
Purple	Retired, not classified (Ret)
Red	Did not qualify (DNQ)
Red	Did not pre-qualify (DNPQ)
Black	Disqualified (DSQ)
White	Did not start (DNS)
White	Withdrew (WD)
White	Race cancelled (C)
Blank	Did not practice (DNP)
Blank	Did not arrive (DNA)
Blank	Excluded (EX)

**Bold** – Pole
Italics – Fastest lap
