= 2019 Blancpain GT Sports Club =

Fifth season of the Blancpain GT Sports Club

The 2019 Blancpain GT Sports Club was the fifth and final season of the SRO Motorsports Group's Blancpain GT Sports Club, an auto racing series for grand tourer cars. The Blancpain GT Sports Club is a championship for Bronze level drivers only, with two additional sub-classes based on age, Titanium and Iron, in order to separate the potential of using higher-level drivers who are often in amateur classes based on their age. The Titanium categorisation for drivers between the age of 50 and 59. The Iron categorisation for drivers over the age of 60 (meaning all drivers who would be FIA Platinum or Gold but are 60 or older). The races were contested with GT3-spec, GTE-spec, GT2-spec and Trophy cars. The season began on 13 April at Monza and ended on 29 September at Barcelona-Catalunya.

== Calendar ==
At the annual press conference during the 2018 24 Hours of Spa on 27 July, the Stéphane Ratel Organisation announced the first draft of the 2019 calendar, in which the Nürburgring initially made an appearance. It was dropped from the schedule and replaced by Misano, when the finalised calendar was announced on 28 March 2019.

Round	Circuit	Date	Supporting
1	Autodromo Nazionale Monza, Monza, Italy	13–14 April	Blancpain GT Series Endurance Cup
2	Circuit Paul Ricard, Le Castellet, France	1–2 June	Blancpain GT Series Endurance Cup
3	Misano World Circuit Marco Simoncelli, Misano Adriatico, Italy	29–30 June	Blancpain GT World Challenge Europe
4	Circuit de Spa-Francorchamps, Stavelot, Belgium	20–21 July	SRO Speedweek
5	Circuit de Barcelona-Catalunya, Montmeló, Spain	28–29 September	Blancpain GT Series Endurance Cup

== Entry list ==
Team	Car	No.	Drivers	Class	Rounds
(Switzerland) Kessel Racing	Ferrari 488 GT3	1	(Poland) Michał Broniszewski		2
(Switzerland) Kessel Racing	Ferrari 488 GT3	12	(Canada) Rick Lovat	Iron	1–3, 5
(Switzerland) Kessel Racing	Ferrari 488 GT3	23	(Russia) Murad Sultanov		All
(Switzerland) Kessel Racing	Ferrari 488 GT3	111	(United States) Stephen Earle	Iron	All
(Switzerland) Kessel Racing	Ferrari 488 GT3	133	(Turkey) Murat Cuhadaroglu	Ti	4
(Belgium) Boutsen Ginion	Lamborghini Gallardo R-EX	2	(France) Pierre Feligioni		5
(Italy) BMS Scuderia Italia	Ferrari 458 Italia GT3	7	(Italy) Luigi Lucchini		2, 5
(Denmark) Reno Racing	Honda NSX GT3	11	(Denmark) Jens Reno Møller		All
(Russia) Capital Racing Team	Mercedes-AMG GT3	13	(Russia) Denis Remenyako		2, 5
(Germany) GetSpeed Performance	Mercedes-AMG GT3	13	(Russia) Denis Remenyako		4
(Austria) HB Racing	Lamborghini Huracán GT3	14	(Belgium) Angélique Detavernier		5
(Austria) HB Racing	Lamborghini Huracán GT3	24	(Sri Lanka) Dilantha Malagamuwa	Ti	1–3, 5
(Austria) HB Racing	Lamborghini Huracán GT3	666	(Austria) Bernhard Loffler		4
(Austria) HB Racing	Lamborghini Huracán GT3	888	(Slovakia) Robert Zwinger		2
(Austria) HP Racing International	Lamborghini Huracán GT3	17	(Germany) Coach McKansy	Ti	All
(Belgium) Audi Sport Team WRT	Audi R8 LMS GT2	25	(United States) James Sofronas		5
(Germany) Rinaldi Racing	Ferrari 488 GT3	33	(Germany) Christian Hook	Ti	3
(Germany) Rinaldi Racing	Ferrari 488 GT3	333	(Russia) Vadim Kogay	Ti	1–2
(United Kingdom) ERC Sport	Mercedes-AMG GT3	44	(United Kingdom) Lee Mowle	Ti	1–4
(Italy) AF Corse	Ferrari 488 GT3	50	(Belgium) Louis-Philippe Soenen	Iron	All
(Italy) AF Corse	Ferrari 488 GT3	51	(Italy) Mario Cordoni		1–4
(Italy) AF Corse	Ferrari 488 GT3	53	(Japan) Ken Abe		1–2
(Italy) AF Corse	Ferrari 488 GT3	54	(Greece) Kriton Lendoudis		2
(Italy) AF Corse	Ferrari 488 GT3	55	(Italy) Frederic Fangio		2, 5
(Italy) AF Corse	Ferrari 488 GT3	56	(United States) Howard Blank	Iron	3–4
(San Marino) GDL Racing	Lamborghini Huracán Super Trofeo	61	(Italy) Roberto Rayneri	Iron	1
(San Marino) StileF Squadra Corse	Ferrari 458 Italia GTE	69	(Switzerland) Hardy Woodcock		2
(San Marino) StileF Squadra Corse	Ferrari 458 Italia GT3	84	(Switzerland) Pete Mitchell		2
(San Marino) StileF Squadra Corse	Ferrari 488 GT3	777	(Russia) Pavel Strukov		All
(Netherlands) Van der Horst Motorsport	Lamborghini Huracán GT3 Evo	98	(Netherlands) Gerard van der Horst	Ti	1–2
(Germany) Attempto Racing	Lamborghini Huracán GT3	100	(Germany) Bernd Kleinbach	Iron	1–2

Icon	Class
Ti	Titanium Cup
Iron	Iron Cup

== Race results ==
Round		Circuit	Pole position	Overall winner	Titanium Winner	Iron Winner
1	R1	(Italy) Monza	(Denmark) No. 11 Reno Racing	(Denmark) No. 11 Reno Racing	(Austria) No. 17 HP Racing International	(Switzerland) No. 111 Kessel Racing
1	R1	(Italy) Monza	(Denmark) Jens Reno Møller	(Denmark) Jens Reno Møller	(Germany) Coach McKansy	(United States) Stephen Earle
1	R2	(Italy) Monza	(Denmark) No. 11 Reno Racing	(Denmark) No. 11 Reno Racing	(United Kingdom) No. 44 ERC Sport	(Switzerland) No. 111 Kessel Racing
1	R2	(Italy) Monza	(Denmark) Jens Reno Møller	(Denmark) Jens Reno Møller	(United Kingdom) Lee Mowle	(United States) Stephen Earle
2	R1	(France) Paul Ricard	(Denmark) No. 11 Reno Racing	(Italy) No. 7 BMS Scuderia Italia	(United Kingdom) No. 44 ERC Sport	(Italy) No. 50 AF Corse
2	R1	(France) Paul Ricard	(Denmark) Jens Reno Møller	(Italy) Luigi Lucchini	(United Kingdom) Lee Mowle	(Belgium) Louis-Philippe Soenen
2	R2	(France) Paul Ricard	(Switzerland) No. 23 Kessel Racing	(Switzerland) No. 23 Kessel Racing	(Austria) No. 17 HP Racing International	(Switzerland) No. 111 Kessel Racing
2	R2	(France) Paul Ricard	(Russia) Murad Sultanov	(Russia) Murad Sultanov	(Germany) Coach McKansy	(United States) Stephen Earle
3	R1	(Italy) Misano	(Germany) No. 33 Rinaldi Racing	(Germany) No. 33 Rinaldi Racing	(Germany) No. 33 Rinaldi Racing	(Switzerland) No. 111 Kessel Racing
3	R1	(Italy) Misano	(Germany) Christian Hook	(Germany) Christian Hook	(Germany) Christian Hook	(United States) Stephen Earle
3	R2	(Italy) Misano	(Germany) No. 33 Rinaldi Racing	(Denmark) No. 11 Reno Racing	(Germany) No. 33 Rinaldi Racing	(Switzerland) No. 111 Kessel Racing
3	R2	(Italy) Misano	(Germany) Christian Hook	(Denmark) Jens Reno Møller	(Germany) Christian Hook	(United States) Stephen Earle
4	R1	(Belgium) Spa-Francorchamps	(Denmark) No. 11 Reno Racing	(Denmark) No. 11 Reno Racing	(Austria) No. 17 HP Racing International	(Switzerland) No. 111 Kessel Racing
4	R1	(Belgium) Spa-Francorchamps	(Denmark) Jens Reno Møller	(Denmark) Jens Reno Møller	(Germany) Coach McKansy	(United States) Stephen Earle
4	R2	(Belgium) Spa-Francorchamps	(Denmark) No. 11 Reno Racing	(Germany) No. 13 GetSpeed Performance	(Austria) No. 17 HP Racing International	(Switzerland) No. 111 Kessel Racing
4	R2	(Belgium) Spa-Francorchamps	(Denmark) Jens Reno Møller	(Russia) Denis Remenyako	(Germany) Coach McKansy	(United States) Stephen Earle
5	R1	(Spain) Barcelona-Catalunya	(Russia) No. 13 Capital Racing Team	(Russia) No. 13 Capital Racing Team	(Austria) No. 17 HP Racing International	(Italy) No. 50 AF Corse
5	R1	(Spain) Barcelona-Catalunya	(Russia) Denis Remenyako	(Russia) Denis Remenyako	(Germany) Coach McKansy	(Belgium) Louis-Philippe Soenen
5	R2	(Spain) Barcelona-Catalunya	(Russia) No. 13 Capital Racing Team	(Switzerland) No. 23 Kessel Racing	(Austria) No. 17 HP Racing International	(Switzerland) No. 111 Kessel Racing
5	R2	(Spain) Barcelona-Catalunya	(Russia) Denis Remenyako	(Russia) Murad Sultanov	(Germany) Coach McKansy	(United States) Stephen Earle

== Championship standings ==
Scoring system

Championship points were awarded for the first ten positions in each race. Entries were required to complete 75% of the winning car's race distance in order to be classified and earn points.

Position	**1st**	**2nd**	**3rd**	**4th**	**5th**	**6th**	**7th**	**8th**	**9th**	**10th**
Points	25	18	15	12	10	8	6	4	2	1

=== Drivers' championships ===
==== Overall ====
Pos.	Driver	Team	MNZ (Italy)		LEC (France)		MIS (Italy)		SPA (Belgium)		CAT (Spain)		Points
1	(Denmark) Jens Reno Møller	(Denmark) Reno Racing	**1**	**1**	**2**	5	8	1	**1**	**2**	4	2	180
2	(Russia) Murad Sultanov	(Switzerland) Kessel Racing	3	2	Ret	**1**	4	3	3	4	2	1	155
3	(Germany) Coach McKansy	(Austria) HP Racing International	4	4	Ret	2	5	4	4	3	5	3	116
4	(United Kingdom) Lee Mowle	(United Kingdom) ERC Sport	8	3	6	4	2	DNS	5	5			77
5	(Italy) Mario Cordoni	(Italy) AF Corse	2	5	3	9	3	5	Ret	DNS			70
6	(Russia) Denis Remenyako	(Russia) Capital Racing Team			7	6					**1**	**11**	82
6	(Russia) Denis Remenyako	(Germany) GetSpeed Performance							2	1			82
7	(Germany) Christian Hook	(Germany) Rinaldi Racing					**1**	**2**					43
8	(United States) Stephen Earle	(Switzerland) Kessel Racing	6	8	16	15	7	7	6	7	12	6	46
9	(Italy) Luigi Lucchini	(Italy) BMS Scuderia Italia			1	8					6	Ret	37
10	(Russia) Pavel Strukov	(San Marino) StileF Squadra Corse	11	6	18	12	10	6	7	6	13	7	37
11	(Slovakia) Robert Zwinger	(Austria) HB Racing			4	3							27
12	(Italy) Frederic Fangio	(Italy) AF Corse			10	7					7	4	25
13	(Sri Lanka) Dilantha Malagamuwa	(Austria) HB Racing	9	13	12	14	6	10			9	8	17
14	(Russia) Vadim Kogay	(Germany) Rinaldi Racing	5	7	Ret	11							16
15	(United States) James Sofronas	(Belgium) Audi Sport Team WRT									3	12	15
16	(Belgium) Louis-Philippe Soenen	(Italy) AF Corse	12	12	9	18	9	Ret	8	8	11	10	13
17	(Switzerland) Pete Mitchell	(San Marino) StileF Squadra Corse			5	21							10
18	(Netherlands) Gerard van der Horst	(Netherlands) Van der Horst Motorsport	7	9	13	17							8
19	(Canada) Rick Lovat	(Switzerland) Kessel Racing	10	10	14	19	Ret	8			14	9	8
20	(United States) Howard Blank	(Italy) AF Corse					11	9	10	9			5
21	(Japan) Ken Abe	(Italy) AF Corse	14	14	8	16							4
22	(Austria) Bernhard Loffler	(Austria) HB Racing							9	10			3
23	(Greece) Kriton Lendoudis	(Italy) AF Corse			11	10							1
	(Germany) Bernd Kleinbach	(Germany) Attempto Racing	13	11	15	20							0
	(Switzerland) Hardy Woodcock	(San Marino) StileF Squadra Corse			17	13							0
	(Italy) Roberto Rayneri	(San Marino) GDL Racing	15	DNS									0
	(Poland) Michał Broniszewski	(Switzerland) Kessel Racing			DNS	DNS							
	(Turkey) Murad Cuhadaroglu	(Switzerland) Kessel Racing							DNS	DNS			
Entries ineligible to score points
	(Belgium) Angélique Detavernier	(Austria) HB Racing									10	5	
	(France) Pierre Feligioni	(Belgium) Boutsen Ginion									8	Ret	
Pos.	Driver	Team	MNZ (Italy)		LEC (France)		MIS (Italy)		SPA (Belgium)		CAT (Spain)		Points

Key
Colour	Result
Gold	Race winner
Silver	2nd place
Bronze	3rd place
Green	Points finish
Blue	Non-points finish
Blue	Non-classified finish (NC)
Purple	Did not finish (Ret)
Black	Disqualified (DSQ)
Black	Excluded (EX)
White	Did not start (DNS)
White	Race cancelled (C)
White	Withdrew (WD)
Blank	Did not participate

**Bold** – Pole
Italics – Fastest Lap

==== Titanium Cup ====
Pos.	Driver	Team	MNZ (Italy)		LEC (France)		MIS (Italy)		SPA (Belgium)		CAT (Spain)		Points
1	(Germany) Coach McKansy	(Austria) HP Racing International	**4**	**4**	**Ret**	**2**	5	4	**4**	**3**	**5**	**3**	201
2	(United Kingdom) Lee Mowle	(United Kingdom) ERC Sport	8	3	6	4	2	DNS	5	5			134
3	(Sri Lanka) Dilantha Malagamuwa	(Austria) HB Racing	9	13	12	14	6	10			9	8	113
4	(Netherlands) Gerard van der Horst	(Netherlands) Van der Horst Motorsport	7	9	13	17							52
5	(Germany) Christian Hook	(Germany) Rinaldi Racing					**1**	**2**					50
6	(Russia) Vadim Kogay	(Germany) Rinaldi Racing	5	7	Ret	11							48
	(Turkey) Murat Cuhadaroglu	(Switzerland) Kessel Racing							DNS	DNS			
Pos.	Driver	Team	MNZ (Italy)		LEC (France)		MIS (Italy)		SPA (Belgium)		CAT (Spain)		Points

==== Iron Cup ====
Pos.	Driver	Team	MNZ (Italy)		LEC (France)		MIS (Italy)		SPA (Belgium)		CAT (Spain)		Points
1	(United States) Stephen Earle	(Switzerland) Kessel Racing	**6**	**8**	16	15	7	7	**6**	7	**12**	6	230
2	(Belgium) Louis-Philippe Soenen	(Italy) AF Corse	12	12	**9**	**18**	9	**Ret**	2	2	11	10	164
3	(Canada) Rick Lovat	(Switzerland) Kessel Racing	10	10	14	19	**Ret**	8			14	**9**	120
4	(Germany) Bernd Kleinbach	(Germany) Attempto Racing	13	11	15	20							54
5	(United States) Howard Blank	(Italy) AF Corse					11	9	10	**9**			45
6	(Italy) Roberto Rayneri	(San Marino) GDL Racing	15	DNS									10
Pos.	Driver	Team	MNZ (Italy)		LEC (France)		MIS (Italy)		SPA (Belgium)		CAT (Spain)		Points

== See also ==
- 2019 Blancpain GT Series
