= 2017 Blancpain GT Sports Club =

The 2017 Blancpain GT Sports Club was the third season of the SRO Group's Blancpain GT Sports Club, an auto racing series for grand tourer cars. The Blancpain GT Sports Club is a championship for Bronze and Iron drivers only. The "Iron" categorisation is within the Bronze category, for drivers over the age of 60. All drivers must participate with GT3-spec cars, RACB G3 cars or GTE-spec cars.

== Calendar ==
At the annual press conference during the 2016 24 Hours of Spa on 29 July, the Stéphane Ratel Organisation announced the first draft of the 2017 calendar. The series started at Misano on 2 April and ended in Barcelona on 1 October. The round at Brands Hatch was replaced by a round in Silverstone. On 7 November, the SRO announced the calendar was finalised, confirming the series would go the Hungaroring to support the Blancpain GT Series Sprint Cup.

Event	Circuit	Date	Supporting
1	Misano World Circuit Marco Simoncelli, Misano, Italy	2 April	Blancpain GT Series Sprint Cup
2	(United Kingdom) Silverstone Circuit, Silverstone, Great Britain	14 May	Blancpain GT Series Endurance Cup
3	Circuit Paul Ricard, Le Castellet, France	25 June	Blancpain GT Series Endurance Cup
4	Circuit de Spa-Francorchamps, Spa, Belgium	29 July	Total 24 Hours of Spa
5	Hungaroring, Mogyoród, Hungary	27 August	Blancpain GT Series Sprint Cup
6	Circuit de Barcelona-Catalunya, Montmeló, Spain	1 October	Blancpain GT Series Endurance Cup

== Entry list ==
Team	Car	No.	Drivers	Class	Rounds
(Belgium) Boutsen Ginion	BMW M6 GT3	2	(Saudi Arabia) Karim Ojjeh		All
(Belgium) Boutsen Ginion	Lamborghini Gallardo R-EX	4	(France) Claude-Yves Gosselin		1–4, 6
(Belgium) Boutsen Ginion	Lamborghini Gallardo R-EX	6	(France) Pierre Feligioni		1–4, 6
(Germany) Artega Rennsport	Ferrari 488 GT3	3	(Germany) Klaus Dieter Frers	Iron	All
(Italy) BMS Scuderia Italia	Ferrari 458 Italia GT3	7	(Italy) Luigi Lucchini		3, 6
(Switzerland) Kessel Racing	Ferrari 488 GTE	11	(Poland) Michał Broniszewski		3
(Switzerland) Kessel Racing	Ferrari 458 Italia GT3	27	(Switzerland) Peter Goerke		6
(Switzerland) Kessel Racing	Ferrari 458 Italia GT3	65	(Luxembourg) Alexis De Bernardi		1–5
(Switzerland) Kessel Racing	Ferrari 458 Italia GT3	77	(Netherlands) Fons Scheltema		2
(Switzerland) Kessel Racing	Ferrari 458 Italia GT3	102	(Italy) Claudio Schiavoni		1
(Switzerland) Kessel Racing	Ferrari 458 Italia GT3	108	(France) Deborah Mayer		1
(Switzerland) Kessel Racing	Ferrari 458 Italia GT3	111	(United States) Stephen Earle	Iron	All
(Belgium) Comtoyou Racing	Audi R8 LMS	12	(Belgium) Angélique Detavernier		4
(Germany) Black Falcon	Mercedes-AMG GT3	16	(United Kingdom) Oliver Morley		2
(Austria) HP Racing	Lamborghini Huracán GT3	17	(Germany) Coach McKansy		All
(Austria) HP Racing	Lamborghini Huracán GT3	18	(Liechtenstein) Daniel Vogt		1–4
(France) CMR	BMW Z4 GT3	21	(Switzerland) Pierre Hirschi		1–2, 4
(Italy) AF Corse	Ferrari 488 GT3	22	(Lebanon) Alex Demirdjian		3
(Italy) AF Corse	Ferrari 488 GT3	48	(Monaco) Martin Lanting	Iron	1
(Italy) AF Corse	Ferrari 458 Italia GTE	48	(Monaco) Martin Lanting	Iron	6
(Italy) AF Corse	Ferrari 458 Challenge	49	(United States) Howard Blank	Cup	2, 6
(Italy) AF Corse	Ferrari 488 GT3	50	(Belgium) Louis-Philippe Soenen	Iron	All
(Italy) AF Corse	Ferrari 458 Italia GT3	51	(Switzerland) Christoph Ulrich		All
(Italy) AF Corse	Ferrari 458 Italia GT3	52	(France) Frederic Fangio		3, 6
(Italy) AF Corse	Ferrari 488 GT3	53	(Italy) Piergiuseppe Perazzini	Iron	4
(Italy) AF Corse	Ferrari 488 GT3	488	(Belgium) Patrick Van Glabeke		All
(San Marino) GDL Racing	Lamborghini Huracán Super Trofeo	24	(Sri Lanka) Dilantha Malagamuwa	Xtra	4, 6
(San Marino) GDL Racing	Mercedes-Benz SLS AMG GT3	66	(Italy) Roberto Rayneri		1–4, 6
(San Marino) GDL Racing	Lamborghini Huracán Super Trofeo	70	(Italy) Mario Cordoni	Xtra	1, 6
(United Kingdom) Barwell Motorsport	Lamborghini Huracán GT3	33	(United Kingdom) Jon Minshaw		2
(Germany) Rinaldi Racing	Ferrari 458 Italia GT3	33	(Germany) Christian Hook		3–6
(Germany) HTP Motorsport	Mercedes-AMG GT3	39	(Netherlands) Wim de Pundert	Iron	1, 3–4, 6
(San Marino) Team Malucelli	Ferrari 458 Italia GT3	60	(San Marino) Marco Galassi		1, 3–4
(Italy) Shipex by Ombra Racing	Lamborghini Huracán GT3	63	(Belgium) Nicolas Vandierendonck		1–4, 6
(Austria) DB-Motorsport	Mercedes-Benz SLS AMG GT3	68	(Austria) Oliver Baumann		1, 5–6
(Austria) DB-Motorsport	BMW Z4 GT3	68	(Austria) Oliver Baumann		4
(France) AKKA ASP	Mercedes-AMG GT3	72	(France) Anthony Pons		All
(France) AKKA ASP	Mercedes-AMG GT3	87	(Switzerland) Daniele Perfetti		1
(France) AKKA ASP	Mercedes-AMG GT3	87	(Canada) Mark Thomas		2
(France) AKKA ASP	Mercedes-AMG GT3	87	(Belgium) Mauro Ricci		3, 6
(France) AKKA ASP	Mercedes-AMG GT3	89	(Switzerland) Daniele Perfetti		3
(Italy) Antonelli Motorsport	Lamborghini Huracán Super Trofeo	350	(Italy) Mauro Casadei	Xtra	1
(San Marino) Stile F Squadra Corse	Ferrari 458 Italia GTE	666	(Switzerland) Yoshiki Ohmura		1
(Germany) Herberth Motorsport	Porsche 911 GT3 R	911	(Germany) Jürgen Häring		2
(Germany) Herberth Motorsport	Porsche 911 GT3 R	991	(Germany) Edward Lewis Brauner		4
(Switzerland) Autovitesse Garage R. Affolter	Lamborghini Huracán GT3	963	(Switzerland) Cédric Leimer		1–4

Icon	Class
Iron	Iron Cup
Xtra	Xtra Cup
Cup	Cup

== Race results ==
Event	Circuit	Pole position	Qualifying Race Winner	Main Race			
Event	Circuit	Pole position	Qualifying Race Winner	Overall winner	Iron Cup Winner	Xtra Cup Winner	Cup Winner
1	(Italy) Misano	(France) No. 72 AKKA ASP	(France) No. 72 AKKA ASP	(France) No. 87 AKKA ASP	(Switzerland) No. 111 Kessel Racing	(San Marino) No. 70 GDL Racing	No entries
1	(Italy) Misano	(France) Anthony Pons	(France) Anthony Pons	(Switzerland) Daniele Perfetti	(United States) Stephen Earle	(Italy) Mario Cordoni	No entries
2	(United Kingdom) Silverstone	(United Kingdom) No. 33 Barwell Motorsport	(United Kingdom) No. 33 Barwell Motorsport	(United Kingdom) No. 33 Barwell Motorsport	(Switzerland) No. 111 Kessel Racing	No entries	(Italy) No. 49 AF Corse
2	(United Kingdom) Silverstone	(United Kingdom) Jon Minshaw	(United Kingdom) Jon Minshaw	(United Kingdom) Jon Minshaw	(United States) Stephen Earle	No entries	(United States) Howard Blank
3	(France) Paul Ricard	(France) No. 72 AKKA ASP	(France) No. 72 AKKA ASP	(France) No. 72 AKKA ASP	(Germany) No. 3 Artega Rennsport	No entries	No entries
3	(France) Paul Ricard	(France) Anthony Pons	(France) Anthony Pons	(France) Anthony Pons	(Germany) Klaus Dieter Frers	No entries	No entries
4	(Belgium) Spa-Francorchamps	(Italy) No. 53 AF Corse	(Italy) No. 53 AF Corse	(Italy) No. 53 AF Corse	(Italy) No. 53 AF Corse	(San Marino) No. 24 GDL Racing	No entries
4	(Belgium) Spa-Francorchamps	(Italy) Piergiuseppe Perazzini	(Italy) Piergiuseppe Perazzini	(Italy) Piergiuseppe Perazzini	(Italy) Piergiuseppe Perazzini	(Sri Lanka) Dilantha Malagamuwa	No entries
5	(Hungary) Hungaroring	(Italy) No. 488 AF Corse	(Italy) No. 488 AF Corse	(Italy) No. 51 AF Corse	(Switzerland) No. 111 Kessel Racing	No entries	No entries
5	(Hungary) Hungaroring	(Belgium) Patrick van Glabeke	(Belgium) Patrick van Glabeke	(Switzerland) Christoph Ulrich	(United States) Stephen Earle	No entries	No entries
6	(Spain) Barcelona-Catalunya	(France) No. 72 AKKA ASP	(France) No. 72 AKKA ASP	Race cancelled after two laps due to heavy rain			
6	(Spain) Barcelona-Catalunya	(France) Anthony Pons	(France) Anthony Pons	Race cancelled after two laps due to heavy rain			

== Championship standings ==
Scoring system

Championship points were awarded for the first six positions in each Qualifying Race and for the first ten positions in each Main Race. Entries were required to complete 75% of the winning car's race distance in order to be classified and earn points.

Qualifying Race points

Position	**1st**	**2nd**	**3rd**	**4th**	**5th**	**6th**
Points	8	6	4	3	2	1

Main Race points

Position	**1st**	**2nd**	**3rd**	**4th**	**5th**	**6th**	**7th**	**8th**	**9th**	**10th**
Points	25	18	15	12	10	8	6	4	2	1

=== Drivers' championships ===
==== Overall ====
Pos.	Driver	Team	MIS (Italy)		SIL (United Kingdom)		LEC (France)		SPA (Belgium)		HUN (Hungary)		CAT (Spain)		Points
Pos.	Driver	Team	QR	MR	QR	MR	QR	MR	QR	MR	QR	MR	QR	MR	Points
1	(France) Anthony Pons	(France) AKKA ASP	**1**	2	5	3	**1**	1	2	2	6	5	**1**	C	119
2	(Switzerland) Christoph Ulrich	(Italy) AF Corse	16	12	8	7	7	6	8	4	2	1	DNS	C	57
3	(Saudi Arabia) Karim Ojjeh	(Belgium) Boutsen Ginion	9	22	3	2	4	4	5	3	Ret	DNS	21	C	54
4	(Switzerland) Daniele Perfetti	(France) AKKA ASP	3	1			2	2							53
5	(Belgium) Patrick Van Glabeke	(Italy) AF Corse	17	8	13	9	Ret	11	3	12	**1**	2	3	C	40
6	(Switzerland) Cédric Leimer	(Switzerland) Autovitesse Garage R. Affolter	2	3	2	5	14	Ret	4	Ret					40
7	(Germany) Klaus Dieter Frers	(Germany) Artega Rennsport	6	6	11	15	9	12	6	6	3	4	6	C	35
8	(United Kingdom) Jon Minshaw	(United Kingdom) Barwell Motorsport			**1**	1									33
9	(Italy) Piergiuseppe Perazzini	(Italy) AF Corse							**1**	1					33
10	(United States) Stephen Earle	(Switzerland) Kessel Racing	14	5	10	11	10	14	12	9	4	3	8	C	32
11	(Luxembourg) Alexis De Bernardi	(Switzerland) Kessel Racing	7	10	7	6	5	5	19	DSQ	7	6			29
12	(Belgium) Mauro Ricci	(France) AKKA ASP					3	3					2	C	25
13	(Belgium) Nicolas Vandierendonck	(Italy) Shipex by Ombra Racing	Ret	Ret	4	4	DNS	13	WD	WD			5	C	17
14	(Germany) Christian Hook	(Germany) Rinaldi Racing					13	10	9	5	8	8	14	C	15
15	(Switzerland) Yoshiki Ohmura	(San Marino) Stile F Squadra Corse	11	4											12
16	(Germany) Coach McKansy	(Austria) HP Racing	8	20	14	13	18	21	Ret	15	5	7	4	C	11
17	(San Marino) Marco Galassi	(San Marino) Team Malucelli	Ret	9			12	7	7	13					8
18	(Netherlands) Wim de Pundert	(Germany) HTP Motorsport	12	7			16	15	WD	WD			11	C	6
19	(Germany) Edward Lewis Brauner	(Germany) Herberth Motorsport							14	7					6
20	(Austria) Oliver Baumann	(Austria) DB-Motorsport	4	Ret					16	16	9	9	7	C	5
21	(Liechtenstein) Daniel Vogt	(Austria) HP Racing	13	Ret	DNS	DNS	8	8	Ret	DNS					4
22	(Netherlands) Fons Scheltema	(Switzerland) Kessel Racing			9	8									4
23	(France) Claude-Yves Gosselin	(Belgium) Boutsen Ginion	10	13	20	12	6	19	10	10			Ret	C	3
24	(Switzerland) Pierre Hirschi	(France) CMR	5	21	21	16			11	DSQ					2
25	(Italy) Luigi Lucchini	(Italy) BMS Scuderia Italia					11	9					20	C	2
26	(Belgium) Louis-Philippe Soenen	(Italy) AF Corse	22	18	16	18	15	16	15	11	10	10	12	C	2
27	(United Kingdom) Oliver Morley	(Germany) Black Falcon			6	DNS									1
28	(Germany) Jürgen Häring	(Germany) Herberth Motorsport			15	10									1
	(France) Pierre Feligioni	(Belgium) Boutsen Ginion	19	16	17	17	19	20	17	17			10	C	0
	(Canada) Mark Thomas	(France) AKKA ASP			12	14									0
	(Monaco) Martin Lanting	(Italy) AF Corse	Ret	Ret									13	C	0
	(Belgium) Angélique Detavernier	(Belgium) Comtoyou Racing							Ret	14					0
	(Italy) Claudio Schiavoni	(Switzerland) Kessel Racing	18	15											0
	(Switzerland) Peter Goerke	(Switzerland) Kessel Racing											15	C	0
	(Italy) Roberto Rayneri	(San Marino) GDL Racing	20	19	18	19	17	17	18	18			16	C	0
	(France) Frederic Fangio	(Italy) AF Corse					Ret	18					17	C	0
	(France) Deborah Mayer	(Switzerland) Kessel Racing	21	17											0
	(Lebanon) Alex Demirdjian	(Italy) AF Corse					EX	DNS							
	(Poland) Michał Broniszewski	(Switzerland) Kessel Racing					DNS	DNS							
Xtra Cup
1	(Sri Lanka) Dilantha Malagamuwa	(San Marino) GDL Racing							**13**	8			9	C	41
2	(Italy) Mario Cordoni	(San Marino) GDL Racing	**15**	11									**19**	C	39
3	(Italy) Mauro Casadei	(Italy) Antonelli Motorsport	DNS	14											18
Cup
1	(United States) Howard Blank	(Italy) AF Corse			**19**	20							**18**	C	41
Pos.	Driver	Team	QR	MR	QR	MR	QR	MR	QR	MR	QR	MR	QR	MR	Points
Pos.	Driver	Team	MIS (Italy)		SIL (United Kingdom)		LEC (France)		SPA (Belgium)		HUN (Hungary)		CAT (Spain)		Points

Key
Colour	Result
Gold	Race winner
Silver	2nd place
Bronze	3rd place
Green	Points finish
Blue	Non-points finish
Blue	Non-classified finish (NC)
Purple	Did not finish (Ret)
Black	Disqualified (DSQ)
Black	Excluded (EX)
White	Did not start (DNS)
White	Race cancelled (C)
White	Withdrew (WD)
Blank	Did not participate

**Bold** – Pole
Italics – Fastest Lap

==== Iron Cup ====
Pos.	Driver	Team	MIS (Italy)		SIL (United Kingdom)		LEC (France)		SPA (Belgium)		HUN (Hungary)		CAT (Spain)		Points
Pos.	Driver	Team	QR	MR	QR	MR	QR	MR	QR	MR	QR	MR	QR	MR	Points
1	(United States) Stephen Earle	(Switzerland) Kessel Racing	14	5	10	11	10	14	12	9	4	3	8	C	142
2	(Germany) Klaus Dieter Frers	(Germany) Artega Rennsport	6	6	**11**	15	**9**	12	6	6	**3**	4	**6**	C	141
3	(Belgium) Louis-Philippe Soenen	(Italy) AF Corse	22	18	16	18	15	16	15	11	10	10	12	C	87
4	(Netherlands) Wim de Pundert	(Germany) HTP Motorsport	12	7			16	18	WD	WD			11	C	43
5	(Italy) Piergiuseppe Perazzini	(Italy) AF Corse							**1**	1					33
	(Monaco) Martin Lanting	(Italy) AF Corse	**Ret**	Ret									13	C	2
Pos.	Driver	Team	QR	MR	QR	MR	QR	MR	QR	MR	QR	MR	QR	MR	Points
Pos.	Driver	Team	MIS (Italy)		SIL (United Kingdom)		LEC (France)		SPA (Belgium)		HUN (Hungary)		CAT (Spain)		Points

== See also ==
- 2017 Blancpain GT Series
