= 2018 Blancpain GT Sports Club =

The 2018 Blancpain GT Sports Club was the fourth season of the SRO Motorsports Group's Blancpain GT Sports Club, an auto racing series for grand tourer cars. The Blancpain GT Sports Club is a championship for Bronze, Titanium and Iron drivers only. The Titanium categorisation is within the Bronze category, for drivers between the age of 50 and 59. The Iron categorisation is within the Bronze category, for drivers over the age of 60. The races are contested with GT3-spec, RACB G3, GTE-spec and Trophy cars.

== Calendar ==
At the annual press conference during the 2017 24 Hours of Spa on 28 July, the Stéphane Ratel Organisation announced the first draft of the 2018 calendar. Autodromo Nazionale Monza replaced Silverstone and acted as the season opener. On 9 October 2017, the finalised calendar of the parent series, Blancpain GT Series, was announced, confirming the dates of the races at the Hungaroring.

Round	Circuit	Date	Supporting
1	Autodromo Nazionale Monza, Monza, Italy	22 April	Blancpain GT Series Endurance Cup
2	Circuit Paul Ricard, Le Castellet, France	3 June	Blancpain GT Series Endurance Cup
3	Misano World Circuit Marco Simoncelli, Misano Adriatico, Italy	24 June	Blancpain GT Series Sprint Cup
4	Circuit de Spa-Francorchamps, Stavelot, Belgium	22 July	SRO Speedweek
5	Hungaroring, Mogyoród, Hungary	2 September	Blancpain GT Series Sprint Cup
6	Circuit de Barcelona-Catalunya, Montmeló, Spain	30 September	Blancpain GT Series Endurance Cup

== Entry list ==
Team	Car	No.	Drivers	Class	Rounds
(Belgium) Boutsen Ginion	BMW M6 GT3	2	(Saudi Arabia) Karim Ojjeh	Ti	All
(Belgium) Boutsen Ginion	Lamborghini Gallardo R-EX	4	(France) Claude-Yves Gosselin	Ti	1–4, 6
(Belgium) Boutsen Ginion	Lamborghini Gallardo R-EX	6	(France) Pierre Feligioni		1–4
(Germany) Artega Rennsport	Ferrari 458 Italia GT3	3	(Germany) Klaus Dieter Frers	Iron	1
(Germany) Artega Rennsport	Ferrari 488 GT3	3	(Germany) Klaus Dieter Frers	Iron	2–6
(Italy) BMS Scuderia Italia	Ferrari 458 Italia GT3	7	(Italy) Luigi Lucchini		2–3, 6
(Switzerland) Kessel Racing	Ferrari 488 GT3	8	(France) Deborah Mayer		2
(Switzerland) Kessel Racing	Ferrari 488 GT3	20	(Switzerland) Claudio Schiavoni	Ti	1–2
(Switzerland) Kessel Racing	Ferrari 488 GT3	23	(Russia) Murad Sultanov		2, 4
(Switzerland) Kessel Racing	Ferrari 488 GT3	111	(United States) Stephen Earle	Iron	All
(Austria) HP Racing International	Lamborghini Huracán GT3	17	(Germany) Coach McKansy	Ti	All
(Germany) Car Collection Motorsport	Audi R8 LMS	18	(Germany) Dirg Parhofer	Ti	2, 6
(San Marino) GDL Racing	Porsche 911 GT3 Cup	24	(Sri Lanka) Dilantha Malagamuwa	Cup	1
(San Marino) GDL Racing	Mercedes-Benz SLS AMG GT3	60	(Italy) Roberto Rayneri	Iron	All
(Germany) Reiter Engineering	Lamborghini Gallardo R-EX	24	(Germany) Kurt Wagner	Ti	4
(Germany) Rinaldi Racing	Ferrari 488 GT3	33	(Germany) Christian Hook	Ti	1–2, 4
(Germany) Rinaldi Racing	Ferrari 488 GT3	33	(Russia) Vadim Kogay	Ti	6
(France) 3Y Technology	BMW M6 GT3	42	(France) Jean-Paul Buffin	Ti	6
(Italy) AF Corse	Ferrari 488 GT3	50	(Belgium) Louis-Philippe Soenen	Iron	All
(Italy) AF Corse	Ferrari 488 GT3	51	(Switzerland) Christoph Ulrich		1
(Italy) AF Corse	Ferrari 488 GT3	53	(Switzerland) Frederic Fangio		1
(Italy) AF Corse	Ferrari 458 Italia GT3	53	(Switzerland) Frederic Fangio		2, 6
(Italy) AF Corse	Ferrari 488 GT3	55	(Belgium) Angélique Detavernier		2, 4–6
(Italy) AF Corse	Ferrari 488 GT3	70	(Italy) Mario Cordoni	Ti	All
(Italy) AF Corse	Ferrari 488 GT3	488	(Belgium) Patrick Van Glabeke		All
(Germany) Herberth Motorsport	Porsche 911 GT3 R	66	(Germany) Jürgen Häring	Ti	All
(Germany) Herberth Motorsport	Porsche 911 GT3 R	72	(Russia) Stanislav Minsky		4
(Germany) Herberth Motorsport	Porsche 911 GT3 R	991	(Germany) Edward Lewis Brauner		1–2, 5–6
(United Kingdom) Team Parker Racing	Bentley Continental GT3	88	(France) Stéphane Ratel	Ti	6
(Germany) Attempto Racing	Lamborghini Huracán GT3	99	(Germany) Mike Hansch		1–2
(Germany) Attempto Racing	Lamborghini Huracán GT3	100	(Germany) Bernd Kleinbach	Iron	1
(Germany) Attempto Racing	Porsche 911 GT3 R	100	(Germany) Bernd Kleinbach	Iron	3
(Austria) HB Racing	Lamborghini Huracán GT3	224	(Sri Lanka) Dilantha Malagamuwa	Ti	6
(Australia) SunEnergy1 Racing by AKKA ASP Team	Mercedes-AMG GT3	751	(Australia) Kenny Habul		5

Icon	Class
Ti	Titanium Cup
Iron	Iron Cup
Cup	Cup

== Race results ==
Round	Circuit	Pole position	Qualifying Race Winner	Main Race			
Round	Circuit	Pole position	Qualifying Race Winner	Overall winner	Titanium Cup Winner	Iron Cup Winner	Cup Winner
1	(Italy) Monza	(Italy) No. 70 AF Corse	(Italy) No. 70 AF Corse	(Italy) No. 70 AF Corse	(Italy) No. 70 AF Corse	(Switzerland) No. 111 Kessel Racing	No finishers
1	(Italy) Monza	(Italy) Mario Cordoni	(Italy) Mario Cordoni	(Italy) Mario Cordoni	(Italy) Mario Cordoni	(United States) Stephen Earle	No finishers
2	(France) Paul Ricard	(Italy) No. 70 AF Corse	(Italy) No. 7 BMS Scuderia Italia	(Belgium) No. 2 Boutsen Ginion	(Belgium) No. 2 Boutsen Ginion	(Germany) No. 3 Artega Rennsport	No entries
2	(France) Paul Ricard	(Italy) Mario Cordoni	(Italy) Luigi Lucchini	(Saudi Arabia) Karim Ojjeh	(Saudi Arabia) Karim Ojjeh	(Germany) Klaus Dieter Frers	No entries
3	(Italy) Misano	(Italy) No. 7 BMS Scuderia Italia	(Italy) No. 7 BMS Scuderia Italia	(Italy) No. 7 BMS Scuderia Italia	(Belgium) No. 2 Boutsen Ginion	(Germany) No. 3 Artega Rennsport	No entries
3	(Italy) Misano	(Italy) Luigi Lucchini	(Italy) Luigi Lucchini	(Italy) Luigi Lucchini	(Saudi Arabia) Karim Ojjeh	(Germany) Klaus Dieter Frers	No entries
4	(Belgium) Spa-Francorchamps	(Belgium) No. 2 Boutsen Ginion	(Belgium) No. 2 Boutsen Ginion	(Belgium) No. 2 Boutsen Ginion	(Belgium) No. 2 Boutsen Ginion	(Germany) No. 3 Artega Rennsport	No entries
4	(Belgium) Spa-Francorchamps	(Saudi Arabia) Karim Ojjeh	(Saudi Arabia) Karim Ojjeh	(Saudi Arabia) Karim Ojjeh	(Saudi Arabia) Karim Ojjeh	(Germany) Klaus Dieter Frers	No entries
5	(Hungary) Hungaroring	(Australia) No. 751 SunEnergy1 Racing by AKKA ASP Team	(Australia) No. 751 SunEnergy1 Racing by AKKA ASP Team	(Belgium) No. 2 Boutsen Ginion	(Belgium) No. 2 Boutsen Ginion	(Switzerland) No. 111 Kessel Racing	No entries
5	(Hungary) Hungaroring	(Australia) Kenny Habul	(Australia) Kenny Habul	(Saudi Arabia) Karim Ojjeh	(Saudi Arabia) Karim Ojjeh	(United States) Stephen Earle	No entries
6	(Spain) Barcelona-Catalunya	(Austria) No. 17 HP Racing International	(Austria) No. 17 HP Racing International	(Italy) No. 488 AF Corse	(Austria) No. 17 HP Racing International	(Switzerland) No. 111 Kessel Racing	No entries
6	(Spain) Barcelona-Catalunya	(Germany) Coach McKansy	(Germany) Coach McKansy	(Belgium) Patrick Van Glabeke	(Germany) Coach McKansy	(United States) Stephen Earle	No entries

== Championship standings ==
Scoring system

Championship points were awarded for the first six positions in each Qualifying Race and for the first ten positions in each Main Race. Entries were required to complete 75% of the winning car's race distance in order to be classified and earn points.

Qualifying Race points

Position	**1st**	**2nd**	**3rd**	**4th**	**5th**	**6th**
Points	8	6	4	3	2	1

Main Race points

Position	**1st**	**2nd**	**3rd**	**4th**	**5th**	**6th**	**7th**	**8th**	**9th**	**10th**
Points	25	18	15	12	10	8	6	4	2	1

=== Drivers' championships ===
==== Overall ====
Pos.	Driver	Team	MNZ (Italy)		LEC (France)		MIS (Italy)		SPA (Belgium)		HUN (Hungary)		CAT (Spain)		Points
Pos.	Driver	Team	QR	MR	QR	MR	QR	MR	QR	MR	QR	MR	QR	MR	Points
1	(Saudi Arabia) Karim Ojjeh	(Belgium) Boutsen Ginion	2	2	2	1	4	2	**1**	1	5	1	2	16	142
2	(Germany) Coach McKansy	(Austria) HP Racing International	6	3	3	15	2	3	5	8	3	3	**1**	2	92
3	(Italy) Mario Cordoni	(Italy) AF Corse	**1**	1	**11**	13	5	9	2	3	2	2	WD	WD	82
4	(Italy) Luigi Lucchini	(Italy) BMS Scuderia Italia			1	2	**1**	1					5	3	76
5	(Belgium) Patrick Van Glabeke	(Italy) AF Corse	16	Ret	4	4	3	10	3	2	4	Ret	3	1	74
6	(United States) Stephen Earle	(Switzerland) Kessel Racing	4	4	15	14	9	7	Ret	11	6	6	8	4	42
7	(Germany) Jürgen Häring	(Germany) Herberth Motorsport	15	DNS	8	6	7	4	4	5	DNS	8	7	10	38
8	(Belgium) Angélique Detavernier	(Italy) AF Corse			6	10			6	4	Ret	4	6	9	30
9	(Germany) Klaus Dieter Frers	(Germany) Artega Rennsport	3	10	14	12	8	5	9	9	Ret	9	10	5	29
10	(Germany) Christian Hook	(Germany) Rinaldi Racing	Ret	5	12	5			7	6					28
11	(France) Claude-Yves Gosselin	(Belgium) Boutsen Ginion	7	6	Ret	8	6	Ret	12	10			9	6	22
12	(Russia) Murad Sultanov	(Switzerland) Kessel Racing			9	3			8	7					21
13	(Germany) Edward Lewis Brauner	(Germany) Herberth Motorsport	5	11	7	9					8	5	4	Ret	17
14	(France) Pierre Feligioni	(Belgium) Boutsen Ginion	10	8	5	11	Ret	6	Ret	12					14
15	(Switzerland) Frederic Fangio	(Italy) AF Corse	11	7	10	7							13	13	12
16	(Belgium) Louis-Philippe Soenen	(Italy) AF Corse	13	9	16	16	10	8	Ret	13	7	7	11	11	12
17	(Australia) Kenny Habul	(Australia) SunEnergy1 Racing by AKKA ASP Team									**1**	DNS			8
18	(Sri Lanka) Dilantha Malagamuwa	(Austria) HB Racing											16	7	6
19	(Russia) Vadim Kogay	(Germany) Rinaldi Racing											15	8	4
20	(Italy) Roberto Rayneri	(San Marino) GDL Racing	14	12	20	17	Ret	12	13	15	9	10	17	14	1
	(Switzerland) Claudio Schiavoni	(Switzerland) Kessel Racing	8	Ret	17	19									0
	(Germany) Mike Hansch	(Germany) Attempto Racing	9	14	13	Ret									0
	(Germany) Kurt Wagner	(Germany) Reiter Engineering							10	Ret					0
	(Germany) Bernd Kleinbach	(Germany) Attempto Racing	12	13			11	11							0
	(Russia) Stanislav Minsky	(Germany) Herberth Motorsport							11	14					0
	(Germany) Dirg Parhofer	(Germany) Car Collection Motorsport			18	20							12	12	0
	(France) Jean-Paul Buffin	(France) 3Y Technology											14	15	0
	(France) Deborah Mayer	(Switzerland) Kessel Racing			19	18									0
	(Switzerland) Christoph Ulrich	(Italy) AF Corse	DNS	DNS											
	(France) Stéphane Ratel	(United Kingdom) Team Parker Racing											WD	WD	
Cup
	(Sri Lanka) Dilantha Malagamuwa	(San Marino) GDL Racing	**DNS**	DNS											
Pos.	Driver	Team	QR	MR	QR	MR	QR	MR	QR	MR	QR	MR	QR	MR	Points
Pos.	Driver	Team	MNZ (Italy)		LEC (France)		MIS (Italy)		SPA (Belgium)		HUN (Hungary)		CAT (Spain)		Points

Key
Colour	Result
Gold	Race winner
Silver	2nd place
Bronze	3rd place
Green	Points finish
Blue	Non-points finish
Blue	Non-classified finish (NC)
Purple	Did not finish (Ret)
Black	Disqualified (DSQ)
Black	Excluded (EX)
White	Did not start (DNS)
White	Race cancelled (C)
White	Withdrew (WD)
Blank	Did not participate

**Bold** – Pole
Italics – Fastest Lap

==== Titanium Cup ====
Pos.	Driver	Team	MNZ (Italy)		LEC (France)		MIS (Italy)		SPA (Belgium)		HUN (Hungary)		CAT (Spain)		Points
Pos.	Driver	Team	QR	MR	QR	MR	QR	MR	QR	MR	QR	MR	QR	MR	Points
1	(Saudi Arabia) Karim Ojjeh	(Belgium) Boutsen Ginion	2	2	2	1	4	2	**1**	1	**5**	1	2	16	160
2	(Germany) Coach McKansy	(Austria) HP Racing International	6	3	3	15	2	3	5	8	3	3	**1**	2	126
3	(Italy) Mario Cordoni	(Italy) AF Corse	**1**	1	**11**	13	**5**	9	2	3	2	2	WD	WD	112
4	(Germany) Jürgen Häring	(Germany) Herberth Motorsport	15	DNS	8	6	7	4	4	5	DNS	8	7	10	82
5	(France) Claude-Yves Gosselin	(Belgium) Boutsen Ginion	7	6	Ret	8	6	Ret	12	10			9	6	57
6	(Germany) Christian Hook	(Germany) Rinaldi Racing	Ret	5	12	5			7	6					46
7	(Sri Lanka) Dilantha Malagamuwa	(Austria) HB Racing											16	7	15
8	(Germany) Dirg Parhofer	(Germany) Car Collection Motorsport			18	20							12	12	14
9	(Russia) Vadim Kogay	(Germany) Rinaldi Racing											15	8	12
10	(Switzerland) Claudio Schiavoni	(Switzerland) Kessel Racing	8	Ret	17	19									9
11	(France) Jean-Paul Buffin	(France) 3Y Technology											14	15	7
12	(Germany) Kurt Wagner	(Germany) Reiter Engineering							10	Ret					1
	(France) Stéphane Ratel	(United Kingdom) Team Parker Racing											WD	WD	
Pos.	Driver	Team	QR	MR	QR	MR	QR	MR	QR	MR	QR	MR	QR	MR	Points
Pos.	Driver	Team	MNZ (Italy)		LEC (France)		MIS (Italy)		SPA (Belgium)		HUN (Hungary)		CAT (Spain)		Points

==== Iron Cup ====
Pos.	Driver	Team	MNZ (Italy)		LEC (France)		MIS (Italy)		SPA (Belgium)		HUN (Hungary)		CAT (Spain)		Points
Pos.	Driver	Team	QR	MR	QR	MR	QR	MR	QR	MR	QR	MR	QR	MR	Points
1	(United States) Stephen Earle	(Switzerland) Kessel Racing	4	4	15	14	9	7	Ret	11	6	6	**8**	4	163
2	(Germany) Klaus Dieter Frers	(Germany) Artega Rennsport	**3**	10	**14**	12	8	5	**9**	9	**Ret**	9	10	5	161
3	(Belgium) Louis-Philippe Soenen	(Italy) AF Corse	13	9	16	16	**10**	8	Ret	13	7	7	11	11	117
4	(Italy) Roberto Rayneri	(San Marino) GDL Racing	14	12	20	17	Ret	12	13	15	9	10	17	14	88
5	(Germany) Bernd Kleinbach	(Germany) Attempto Racing	12	13			11	11							29
Pos.	Driver	Team	QR	MR	QR	MR	QR	MR	QR	MR	QR	MR	QR	MR	Points
Pos.	Driver	Team	MNZ (Italy)		LEC (France)		MIS (Italy)		SPA (Belgium)		HUN (Hungary)		CAT (Spain)		Points

== See also ==
- 2018 Blancpain GT Series
