= Daniel Vogt =

Daniel Vogt may refer to:

- Daniel Vogt (skier) (born 1972), Liechtensteiner skier
- Daniel A. Vogt, American politician
