= 2026 4 Hours of Le Castellet =

The 2026 4 Hours of Le Castellet may refer to:

- 2026 4 Hours of Le Castellet (ELMS), a round of the 2026 European Le Mans Series held on 3 May 2026
- 2026 4 Hours of Le Castellet (AsLMS), a round of the 2026–27 Asian Le Mans Series scheduled to be held on 14–15 November 2026
