= Malthe Jakobsen =

Danish racing driver (born 2003)

- Jakobsen at Silverstone Circuit in 2026.
- Nationality: (Denmark) Danish
- Born: Malthe Taarngaard Jakobsen; 29 October 2003 (age 23) Sennels, Denmark

FIA World Endurance Championship career
- Debut season: 2025
- Current team: McLaren Hypercar Team
- Categorisation: FIA Silver (2020–2022); FIA Gold (2023–)
- Former teams: Peugeot TotalEnergies
- Starts: 16
- Wins: 0
- Podiums: 1
- Poles: 1
- Fastest laps: 0
- Best finish: 18th in 2026

Previous series
- 2020-2024 2021, 2023-2024-2025 2020-2022 2018-2019: European Le Mans Series; Asian Le Mans Series; Le Mans Cup; F4 Danish Championship

Championship titles
- 2024-2025 2023-2024 2022 2019: AsLMS - LMP2; AsLMS - LMP2; ELMS - LMP3; F4 Danish Championship

Malthe Taarngaard Jakobsen (born 29 October 2003) is a Danish racing driver who is set to compete in the FIA World Endurance Championship for McLaren. He previously drove for Peugeot. Jakobsen is the 2022 European Le Mans Series champion in the LMP3 class with Cool Racing and three-time champion of the Asian Le Mans Series.

== Single-seater career ==
=== 2018 ===
Jakobsen began his car racing career in his homeland, competing for FSP in the 2018 F4 Danish Championship. Having initially struggled in the first half of the year, the Dane scored three category podiums and a pole position in the final third of the campaign, thus finishing sixth in the standings.

Near the end of the year, Jakobsen also made two cameo appearances in the F4 South East Asia Championship, where he took his first win in single-seater motorsport at Sepang.

=== 2019 ===
The following season, Jakobsen remained with FSP in Danish F4. After missing the season opener, a triple of podiums at Jyllandsringen, which included a win in Race 3, commenced Jakobsen's title campaign. A pair of victories at Djursland and Kinnekulle followed respectively, before he took a hattrick of victories at Padborg Park. Three more wins followed, as Jakobsen locked out the championship in dominating fashion in the season finale, finishing 78 points ahead of his nearest challenger, Jonas Lindhard Nielsen. At the end of the campaign, Jakobsen represented Denmark at the inaugural FIA Motorsport Games Formula 4 Cup.

== Endurance career ==
=== LMP3 journey (2020–2022) ===
==== 2020 ====
For 2020, Jakobsen switched to prototype racing, competing in the LMP3 category of the European Le Mans Series for RLR MSport alongside James Dayson. He finished his rookie campaign, during which he was described as having shown "maturity beyond his years", tenth in the standings, with a sole podium coming at the season opener in Le Castellet.

==== 2021 ====
Jakobsen stayed with RLR for another year in the ELMS, this time partnering Mike Benham and Alex Kapadia. His team once again started their campaign out with a podium, a second place in Barcelona, but failed to finish three of the remaining five races, thus dropping to ninth by season's end.

==== 2022 ====
Going into his third season of the European Le Mans Series, Jakobsen made the move to Cool Racing. Commencing the season at Paul Ricard, Jakobsen started out in strong fashion, taking pole position and helping his team to win the four hour-long race. Another pole position came at the next round in Imola, which would eventually result in a podium finish. The following event, held in Monza, would bear less fruit however, as the team was forced to retire from the race. Following another third place in Barcelona, where Jakobsen scored his fourth pole in four races, a collision by his teammate Maurice Smith meant the end of the race in Spa-Francorchamps, which made the team's title aspirations seem unlikely going into the season finale at Portimão. In spite of the uphill task, Jakobsen managed to take pole position once more, making him the season's only LMP3 polesitter, and ended up winning the race. With title rivals Inter Europol Competition retiring late in the race following a car failure with a subsequent collision, Jakobsen, Smith and Mike Benham were crowned champions of the ELMS' LMP3 category.

As a result of his championship victory, Jakobsen was invited to test the Peugeot 9X8 Hypercar during the FIA World Endurance Championship rookie test in November 2022.

=== LMP2 titles (2023–2024) ===
==== 2023 ====
Progression to the LMP2 class was in order for the 2023 season, as Jakobsen remained with Cool Racing in the ELMS. Before embarking on his European season however, the Dane teamed up with Nicolas Lapierre and amateur Alexandre Coigny in the Asian Le Mans Series. Despite Jakobsen setting the fastest lap in the second race at Dubai, the team experienced a difficult opening event, as Coigny collided with a GT car in Race 1 and the outfit finished fifth on Sunday. For the event at the Yas Marina Circuit, Lapierre would step away from driving duties in order to give Jakobsen more seat time during the races, which ended up paying off immediately, the Dane taking a commanding victory on Saturday. On Sunday, a pair of penalties due to an infringement regarding minimum pit stop time and a collision caused by Jakobsen would end the outfit's chances of obtaining victory, as Jakobsen and Coigny finished third, which earned them the runner-up spot in the championship.

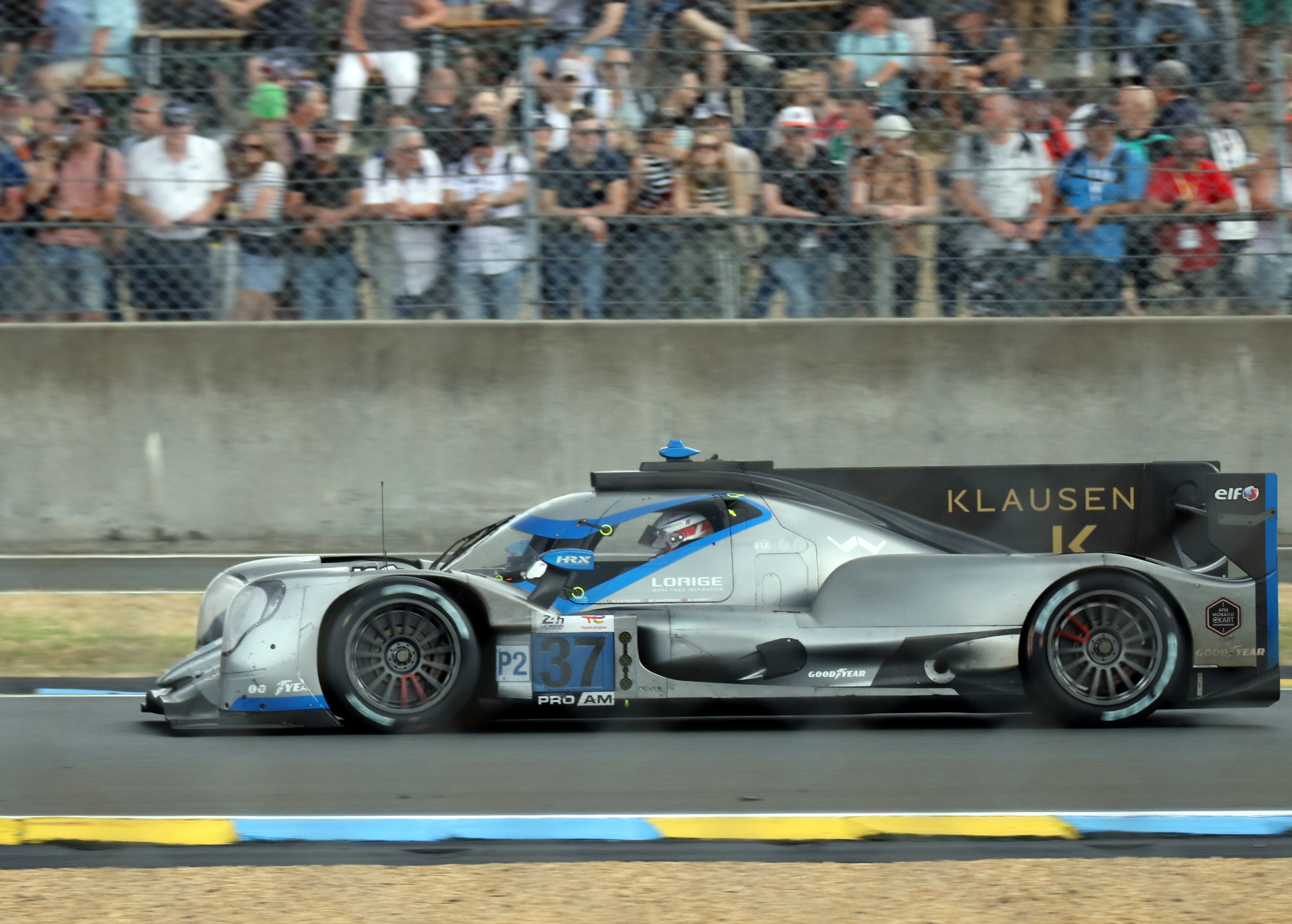
Jakobsen driving the No. 37 Oreca 07 at the 2023 24 Hours of Le Mans

The team's European campaign started positively, as a third place in class at Barcelona was followed by a second place at Le Castellet. During the third round in Aragón however, Jakobsen caused the No. 37 to retire for the only time that year, missing his braking point for turn one and colliding with the fellow Cool Racing car of José María López. The next race at Spa-Francorchamps saw a return to form, with Jakobsen playing a starring role in the team's first Pro-Am victory and overall second place. Another class win followed during the 4 Hours of Algarve, where a late ten-second-penalty for the leading Mathias Beche gifted the No. 37 another 25 points, placing them into championship contention for the season finale. Despite an early spin by Coigny during the second race at Portimão, Jakobsen was able to make up ground during the final stints, getting within a second of the race-winning AF Corse of Ben Barnicoat.

At the start of November, it was announced that Jakobsen would pair up with George Kurtz and Colin Braun in that winter's Asian Le Mans Series, driving for the Algarve Pro Racing-run CrowdStrike Racing team. There, victories at Sepang and Yas Marina gave the trio the AsLMS title.

==== 2024 ====
At the start of 2024, Jakobsen and CrowdStrike Racing by APR took part in the 24 Hours of Daytona, finishing second after losing out in a late battle with Christian Rasmussen. Thereafter, Jakobsen remained with Cool Racing's ELMS outfit in 2024, being partnered by silver-ranked Lorenzo Fluxá and Super Formula champion Ritomo Miyata in the LMP2 Pro class. At the opening round in Barcelona, Jakobsen inherited the lead due to a fast pit stop and held on to win. Jakobsen found himself leading once again at Le Castellet, though his race was ended by a gearbox failure with 43 minutes to go. A crash for substitute teammate Paul-Loup Chatin with an LMP3 car at Imola and two points finishes later, the team were out of the title fight. However, the No. 37 team would take third in the drivers' standings after a controlled display at Portimão, as Jakobsen managed his gap to the title-winning No. 14 AO by TF crew.

Jakobsen once again entered the Asian Le Mans Series going into the winter, driving for Algarve Pro with Valerio Rinicella and Michael Jensen. The trio dominated, winning a race each at Sepang, Dubai, and Abu Dhabi. At the final race, a fourth place was enough to clinch the title.

=== Hypercar step-up and LMP2 double programme (2025–present) ===
==== 2025 ====
Ahead of the 2025 season, Jakobsen was promoted to Peugeot TotalEnergies in the top class of the FIA World Endurance Championship, where he partnered Loïc Duval and Stoffel Vandoorne in the No. 94. The first three races did not yield points, despite the team showing promising pace. At Spa, Jakobsen was running inside the top five before contact with Robin Frijns after a safety car restart caused race-ending suspension damage. After finishing 11th at Le Mans, Jakobsen qualified fourth for the 6 Hours of São Paulo. During the race, the team fell back, finishing sixth. At Cota, Jakobsen and his teammates profited from rainy conditions to finish third. The No. 94 finished the final two races in tenth; Jakobsen shining in qualifying at Bahrain by placing third. The results placed Jakobsen 19th in the standings, with Peugeot being seventh in the manufacturers' championship.

== Racing record ==
=== Racing career summary ===
Season	Series	Team	Races	Wins	Poles	F/Laps	Podiums	Points	Position
2018	F4 Danish Championship	FSP	24	0	1	0	6	238	6th
2018	Formula 4 South East Asia Championship	Meritus.GP	6	1	0	0	2	70	8th
2019	F4 Danish Championship	FSP	21	11	6	6	18	428	**1st**
2019	Formula 4 South East Asia Championship	Meritus.GP	12	0	0	0	3	89	12th
2019	FIA Motorsport Games Formula 4 Cup	Team Denmark	2	0	0	0	0	N/A	17th
2020	European Le Mans Series - LMP3	RLR MSport	5	0	0	0	1	35	10th
2020	Le Mans Cup - LMP3	RLR MSport	2	0	0	0	0	0	NC†
2021	Asian Le Mans Series - LMP3	RLR MSport	4	0	1	2	0	27	7th
2021	European Le Mans Series - LMP3	RLR MSport	6	0	0	2	1	32	9th
2021	IMSA SportsCar Championship - LMP3	Performance Tech Motorsports	1	0	0	0	0	252	32nd
2021	Le Mans Cup - LMP3	RLR Motorsport	2	0	0	0	1	0	NC†
2022	European Le Mans Series - LMP3	Cool Racing	6	2	6	3	4	86	**1st**
2022	Le Mans Cup - LMP3	Cool Racing	7	1	0	2	1	53	4th
2022	IMSA SportsCar Championship - LMP3	Sean Creech Motorsport	5	1	1	1	3	1241	8th
2023	Asian Le Mans Series - LMP2	Cool Racing	4	1	0	2	2	54	**2nd**
2023	European Le Mans Series - LMP2 Pro-Am	Cool Racing	6	2	0	2	5	101	**2nd**
2023	24 Hours of Le Mans - LMP2	Cool Racing	1	0	0	0	0	N/A	12th
2023–24	Asian Le Mans Series - LMP2	CrowdStrike Racing by APR	5	2	0	1	3	83	**1st**
2024	European Le Mans Series - LMP2	Cool Racing	6	2	0	0	2	62	**3rd**
2024	24 Hours of Le Mans - LMP2	Cool Racing	1	0	0	0	0	N/A	12th
2024	IMSA SportsCar Championship - LMP2	CrowdStrike Racing by APR	1	0	0	0	1	612	31st
2024	IMSA SportsCar Championship - LMP2	DragonSpeed	1	0	0	0	0	612	31st
2024	FIA World Endurance Championship - Hypercar	Peugeot TotalEnergies	Reserve driver						
2024–25	Asian Le Mans Series - LMP2	Algarve Pro Racing	6	3	0	0	3	109	**1st**
2025	FIA World Endurance Championship - Hypercar	Peugeot TotalEnergies	8	0	0	0	1	28	19th
2025	IMSA SportsCar Championship - LMP2	CrowdStrike Racing by APR	5	0	0	0	1	1380	23rd
2025–26	Asian Le Mans Series - LMP2	CrowdStrike Racing by APR	6	3	0	0	5	109	**1st**
2026	European Le Mans Series – LMP2 Pro-Am	Algarve Pro Racing	6	2	0	0	4	86	**1st**
2026	IMSA SportsCar Championship - LMP2	CrowdStrike Racing by APR	1	1	0	1	1	373	31st
2026	FIA World Endurance Championship - Hypercar	Peugeot TotalEnergies	8	0	1	0	0	24	18th
2026–27	Asian Le Mans Series - LMP2	Algarve Pro Racing							

^{†} As Jakobsen was a guest driver, he was ineligible to score points.^{*} Season still in progress.

=== Complete F4 Danish Championship results ===
(key) (Races in bold indicate pole position) (Races in italics indicate fastest lap)

Year	Team	1	2	3	4	5	6	7	8	9	10	11	12	13	14	15	16	17	18	19	20	21	22	23	24	DC	Points
2018	FSP	PAD1; 1; 6	PAD1; 2; 8	PAD1; 3; 5	JYL1; 1; 5	JYL1; 2 Ret	JYL1; 3; 9	DJU; 1; 5	DJU; 2; 12	DJU; 3; 8	RUD; 1; 11	RUD; 2; 6	RUD; 3; 7	JYL2; 1; 5	JYL2; 2; 5	JYL2; 3; 4	PAD2; 1; 3	PAD2; 2; 4	PAD2; 3; 3	**DJU2**; **1**; 3	DJU2; 2; 7	DJU2; 3; 4	JYL3; 1; 4	JYL3; 2; 5	JYL3; 3; 7	6th	238
2019	FSP	PAD1; 1	PAD1; 2	PAD1; 3	JYL1; 1; 2	JYL1; 2; 3	JYL1; 3; 1	**DJU1**; **1**; 1	DJU1; 2; 4	DJU1; 3; 1	**KIN**; **1**; 1	KIN; 2; 3	KIN; 3; 1	**PAD2**; **3**; 1	PAD2; 3; 1	PAD2; 3; 1	**JYL2**; **1**; 1	JYL2; 2; 4	JYL2; 3; 1	**DJU2**; **1**; 2	DJU2; 2; 2	DJU2; 3; 1	**JYL3**; **1**; 3	JYL3; 2; 4	JYL3; 3; 2	1st	428

=== Complete FIA Motorsport Games results ===
Year	Entrant	Cup	Qualifying	Quali Race	Main race
2019	Team Denmark	**Formula 4**	8th	6th	17th

=== Complete European Le Mans Series results ===
(key) (Races in bold indicate pole position; results in italics indicate fastest lap)

Year	Entrant	Class	Chassis	Engine	1	2	3	4	5	6	Rank	Points
2020	RLR MSport	LMP3	Ligier JS P320	Nissan VK56DE 5.6L V8	LEC; 3	SPA; 7	LEC; 4	MNZ; 9	ALG; Ret		10th	35
2021	RLR MSport	LMP3	Ligier JS P320	Nissan VK56DE 5.6L V8	CAT; 2	RBR; Ret	LEC; 4	MNZ; 9	SPA; Ret	ALG; Ret	9th	32
2022	Cool Racing	LMP3	Ligier JS P320	Nissan VK56DE 5.6L V8	**LEC**; 1	**IMO**; 3	**MNZ**; Ret	**CAT**; 3	**SPA**; Ret	**ALG**; 1	1st	86
2023	Cool Racing	LMP2 Pro-Am	Oreca 07	Gibson GK428 4.2 L V8	CAT; 3	LEC; 2	ARA; Ret	SPA; 1	PRT; 1	ALG; 2	2nd	101
2024	Cool Racing	LMP2	Oreca 07	Gibson GK428 4.2 L V8	CAT; 1	LEC; Ret	IMO; Ret	SPA; 5	MUG; 9	ALG; 1	3rd	62
2026	Algarve Pro Racing	LMP2 Pro-Am	Oreca 07	Gibson GK428 4.2 L V8	CAT; 1	LEC; 11	IMO; 2	SPA; 2	SIL; 11	ALG; 1	1st	86

^{*} Season still in progress.

=== Complete Le Mans Cup results ===
(key) (Races in bold indicate pole position; results in italics indicate fastest lap)

Year	Entrant	Class	Chassis	1	2	3	4	5	6	7	Rank	Points
2020	RLR MSport	LMP3	Ligier JS P320	LEC1	SPA	LEC2	LMS; 1; 7	LMS; 2; 6	MNZ	ALG	NC†	0
2021	RLR MSport	LMP3	Ligier JS P320	CAT	LEC	MNZ	LMS; 1 Ret	LMS; 2; 3	SPA	ALG	NC†	0
2022	Cool Racing	LMP3	Ligier JS P320	LEC; Ret	IMO; 1	LMS; 1; 27	LMS; 2; 5	MNZ; 16	SPA; 5	ALG; 4	4th	53

=== WeatherTech SportsCar Championship results ===
(key)(Races in bold indicate pole position, Results are overall/class)

Year	Team	Class	Chassis	Engine	1	2	3	4	5	6	7	Rank	Points
2021	Performance Tech Motorsports	LMP3	Ligier JS P320	Nissan VK56DE 5.6 L V8	DAY	SEB	MDO	WGL	WGL	ELK	PET; 9	32nd	252
2022	Sean Creech Motorsport	LMP3	Ligier JS P320	Nissan VK56DE 5.6 L V8	DAY; 2†	SEB; 1	MDO	WGL; 5	MOS	**ELK**; 9	PET; 3	8th	1241
2024	CrowdStrike Racing by APR	LMP2	Oreca 07	Gibson GK428 4.2 L V8	DAY; 2		WGL	MOS	ELK	IMS	PET	31st	612
2024	DragonSpeed	LMP2	Oreca 07	Gibson GK428 4.2 L V8		SEB; 7						31st	612
2025	CrowdStrike Racing by APR	LMP2	Oreca 07	Gibson GK428 4.2 L V8	DAY; 6	SEB; 6	WGL; 3	MOS	ELK; 6	IMS; 10	PET	23rd	1380
2026	CrowdStrike Racing by APR	LMP2	Oreca 07	Gibson GK428 4.2 L V8	DAY; 1	SEB	WGL	MOS	ELK	IMS	PET	31st	373

^{†} Points only counted towards the Michelin Endurance Cup, and not the overall LMP3 Championship.

^{*} Season still in progress.

=== Complete 24 Hours of Daytona results ===
Year	Team	Co-Drivers	Car	Class	Laps	Pos.	Class Pos.
2022	(United States) Sean Creech Motorsport	(Portugal) João Barbosa (Guernsey) Sebastian Priaulx (United States) Lance Willsey	Ligier JS P320	LMP3	722	15th	**2nd**
2024	(United States) CrowdStrike Racing by APR	(United States) Colin Braun (United States) George Kurtz (United Kingdom) Toby Sowery	Oreca 07	LMP2	767	10th	**2nd**
2025	(United States) CrowdStrike Racing by APR	(United States) Colton Herta (United States) George Kurtz (United Kingdom) Toby Sowery	Oreca 07	LMP2	755	14th	7th
2026	(United States) CrowdStrike Racing by APR	(United Kingdom) Alex Quinn (United States) George Kurtz (United Kingdom) Toby Sowery	Oreca 07	LMP2	686	10th	1st

=== Complete Asian Le Mans Series results ===
(key) (Races in bold indicate pole position) (Races in italics indicate fastest lap)

Year	Team	Class	Car	Engine	1	2	3	4	5	6	Pos.	Points
2021	RLR MSport	LMP3	Ligier JS P320	Nissan VK56DE 5.6L V8	DUB; 1; 6	DUB; 2; 7	ABU; 1; 4	**ABU**; **2** Ret			7th	27
2023	Cool Racing	LMP2	Oreca 07	Gibson GK428 4.2 L V8	DUB; 1; 8	DUB; 2; 5	ABU; 1; 1	ABU; 2; 3			2nd	54
2023–24	CrowdStrike Racing by APR	LMP2	Oreca 07	Gibson GK428 4.2 L V8	SEP; 1; 6	SEP; 2; 1	DUB; 3	ABU; 1; 1	ABU; 2; 5		1st	83
2024–25	Algarve Pro Racing	LMP2	Oreca 07	Gibson GK428 4.2 L V8	SEP; 1; 4	SEP; 2; 1	DUB; 1; 1	DUB; 2; 5	ABU; 1; 1	ABU; 2; 4	1st	109
2025–26	CrowdStrike Racing by APR	LMP2	Oreca 07	Gibson GK428 4.2 L V8	SEP; 1; 3	SEP; 2; 3	DUB; 1; 1	DUB; 2; 1	ABU; 1; 1	ABU; 2; 8	1st	109

=== Complete 24 Hours of Le Mans results ===
Year	Team	Co-Drivers	Car	Class	Laps	Pos.	Class Pos.
2023	(Switzerland) Cool Racing	(Switzerland) Alexandre Coigny (France) Nicolas Lapierre	Oreca 07-Gibson	LMP2	317	23rd	12th
2023	(Switzerland) Cool Racing	(Switzerland) Alexandre Coigny (France) Nicolas Lapierre	Oreca 07-Gibson	LMP2 Pro-Am	317	23rd	**2nd**
2024	(Switzerland) Cool Racing	(Spain) Lorenzo Fluxá (Japan) Ritomo Miyata	Oreca 07-Gibson	LMP2	289	26th	12th
2025	(France) Peugeot TotalEnergies	(France) Loïc Duval (Belgium) Stoffel Vandoorne	Peugeot 9X8	Hypercar	384	11th	11th
2026	(France) Peugeot TotalEnergies	(France) Loïc Duval (France) Théo Pourchaire	Peugeot 9X8	Hypercar	377	11th	11th

=== Complete FIA World Endurance Championship results ===
Year	Entrant	Class	Chassis	Engine	1	2	3	4	5	6	7	8	Rank	Points
2025	Peugeot TotalEnergies	Hypercar	Peugeot 9X8	Peugeot X6H 2.6 L Turbo V6	QAT; 12	IMO; 12	SPA; Ret	LMS; 10	SÃO; 6	COA; 3	FUJ; 10	BHR; 10	19th	28
2026	Peugeot TotalEnergies	Hypercar	Peugeot 9X8	Peugeot X6H 2.6 L Turbo V6	IMO; 12	**SPA**; Ret	LMS; 10	SÃO; 14	COA; 10	FUJ; 6	CAT; 13	MNZ; 4	18th	24

^{*} Season still in progress.
