= Sennels =

- Village
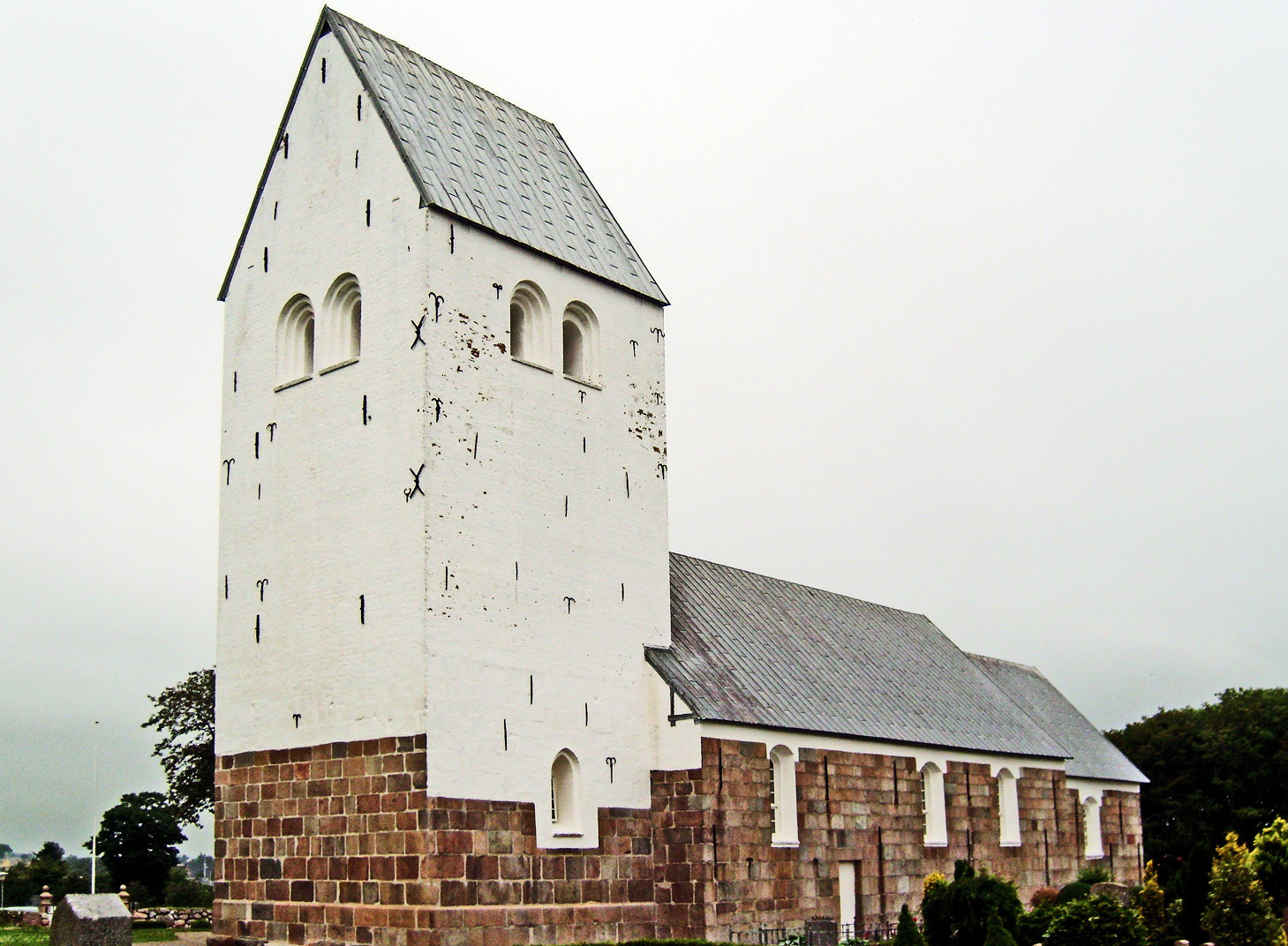
- Sennels Church

- Location within North Jutland Region Location within Denmark
- Coordinates: 56°57′48″N 8°47′33″E
- Country: Denmark
- Region: North Jutland Region
- Municipality: Thisted Municipality

Population (2026)
  - Total: 972

Sennels is a village, with a population of 972 (1 January 2026), in Thisted Municipality, North Jutland Region in Denmark. It is located on the northern shore of the Limfjord 7 km east of Thisted.

Sennels Church from the 12th century is located in the village.

== Notable people ==
- Malthe Jakobsen (born 2003), racing driver
