= 2026 4 Hours of Imola =

Endurance sportscar racing event

The layout of the Imola Circuit

The 2026 4 Hours of Imola was a endurance sportscar racing event, held between 3 and 5 July 2026 at Imola Circuit in Imola, Italy. It was the third of six rounds of the 2026 European Le Mans Series season, and the eighth running of the event as part of the championship.

== Entry list ==
The provisional entry list was published on 1 July 2026 and consisted of 47 entries across 4 categories – 11 in LMP2, 12 in LMP2 Pro-Am, 10 in LMP3, and 14 in LMGT3.

== Schedule ==
Date	Time (local: CEST)	Event
Friday, 3 July	10:50	Free Practice 1
Friday, 3 July	14:55	Bronze Driver Collective Test
Saturday, 4 July	10:50	Free Practice 2
Saturday, 4 July	14:55	Qualifying – LMGT3
Saturday, 4 July	15:20	Qualifying – LMP3
Saturday, 4 July	15:45	Qualifying – LMP2 Pro-Am
Saturday, 4 July	16:10	Qualifying – LMP2
Sunday, 5 July	13:00	Race

== Free practice ==
Two practice sessions were held before the event: one on Friday and one on Saturday. Both sessions ran for 90 minutes.

=== Practice 1 ===
The first practice session started at 10:50 CEST on Friday.

=== Practice 2 ===
The second and final practice session started at 10:50 CEST on Saturday.

== Qualifying ==
Qualifying started at 14:55 CEST on Saturday, with four sessions of fifteen minutes each, one session for each class.

=== Qualifying results ===
Pole position winners in each class are marked in bold.

== Race ==
The race started at 13:00 CEST on Sunday. The race was won by the No. 29 Forestier Racing by Panis Oreca 07, driven by Oliver Gray, Esteban Masson and Louis Rousset.

=== Race results ===
The minimum number of laps for classification (70% of overall winning car's distance) was 89 laps. Class winners are in bold and ‡.

Pos	Class	No	Team	Drivers	Chassis	Tyre	Laps	Time/Retired
Pos	Class	No	Team	Drivers	Engine	Tyre	Laps	Time/Retired
1	**LMP2**	**29**	**(France) Forestier Racing by Panis**	**(United Kingdom) Oliver Gray** **(France) Esteban Masson** **(France) Louis Rousset**	**Oreca 07**	G	**126**	**4:00:05.880‡**
1	**LMP2**	**29**	**(France) Forestier Racing by Panis**	**(United Kingdom) Oliver Gray** **(France) Esteban Masson** **(France) Louis Rousset**	**Gibson GK428 4.2 L V8**	G	**126**	**4:00:05.880‡**
2	LMP2	22	(United Kingdom) United Autosports	(United Kingdom) Ben Hanley (Australia) Griffin Peebles (Switzerland) Grégoire Saucy	Oreca 07	G	126	+51.594
2	LMP2	22	(United Kingdom) United Autosports	(United Kingdom) Ben Hanley (Australia) Griffin Peebles (Switzerland) Grégoire Saucy	Gibson GK428 4.2 L V8	G	126	+51.594
3	LMP2	25	(Portugal) Algarve Pro Racing	(United Kingdom) Jake Hughes (Liechtenstein) Matthias Kaiser (France) Tristan Vautier	Oreca 07	G	126	+59.006
3	LMP2	25	(Portugal) Algarve Pro Racing	(United Kingdom) Jake Hughes (Liechtenstein) Matthias Kaiser (France) Tristan Vautier	Gibson GK428 4.2 L V8	G	126	+59.006
4	LMP2	18	(France) IDEC Sport	(United Kingdom) Jamie Chadwick (Germany) Laurents Hörr (Italy) Valerio Rinicella	Oreca 07	G	126	+1:04.572
4	LMP2	18	(France) IDEC Sport	(United Kingdom) Jamie Chadwick (Germany) Laurents Hörr (Italy) Valerio Rinicella	Gibson GK428 4.2 L V8	G	126	+1:04.572
5	**LMP2 Pro-Am**	**7**	**(United Kingdom) Vector Sport**	**(Turkey) Cem Bölükbaşı** **(Spain) Lorenzo Fluxá** **(Denmark) Jens Reno Møller**	**Oreca 07**	G	**126**	**+1:10.028‡**
5	**LMP2 Pro-Am**	**7**	**(United Kingdom) Vector Sport**	**(Turkey) Cem Bölükbaşı** **(Spain) Lorenzo Fluxá** **(Denmark) Jens Reno Møller**	**Gibson GK428 4.2 L V8**	G	**126**	**+1:10.028‡**
6	LMP2 Pro-Am	20	(Portugal) Algarve Pro Racing	(Denmark) Malthe Jakobsen (Denmark) Michael Jensen (Italy) Enzo Trulli	Oreca 07	G	126	+1:14.131
6	LMP2 Pro-Am	20	(Portugal) Algarve Pro Racing	(Denmark) Malthe Jakobsen (Denmark) Michael Jensen (Italy) Enzo Trulli	Gibson GK428 4.2 L V8	G	126	+1:14.131
7	LMP2 Pro-Am	21	(United Kingdom) United Autosports	(United Kingdom) Oliver Jarvis (Japan) Marino Sato (Brazil) Daniel Schneider	Oreca 07	G	126	+1:15.555
7	LMP2 Pro-Am	21	(United Kingdom) United Autosports	(United Kingdom) Oliver Jarvis (Japan) Marino Sato (Brazil) Daniel Schneider	Gibson GK428 4.2 L V8	G	126	+1:15.555
8	LMP2	24	(United Kingdom) Nielsen Racing	(Australia) Jack Doohan (Israel) Roy Nissany (United Kingdom) Edward Pearson	Oreca 07	G	126	+1:16.962
8	LMP2	24	(United Kingdom) Nielsen Racing	(Australia) Jack Doohan (Israel) Roy Nissany (United Kingdom) Edward Pearson	Gibson GK428 4.2 L V8	G	126	+1:16.962
9	LMP2 Pro-Am	19	(United Arab Emirates) Rossa Racing by Virage	(Portugal) Manuel Espírito Santo (United States) John Falb (Netherlands) Rik Koen	Oreca 07	G	126	+1:22.315
9	LMP2 Pro-Am	19	(United Arab Emirates) Rossa Racing by Virage	(Portugal) Manuel Espírito Santo (United States) John Falb (Netherlands) Rik Koen	Gibson GK428 4.2 L V8	G	126	+1:22.315
10	LMP2 Pro-Am	83	(Italy) AF Corse	(Italy) Antonio Fuoco (France) François Perrodo (France) Matthieu Vaxivière	Oreca 07	G	126	+1:23.752
10	LMP2 Pro-Am	83	(Italy) AF Corse	(Italy) Antonio Fuoco (France) François Perrodo (France) Matthieu Vaxivière	Gibson GK428 4.2 L V8	G	126	+1:23.752
11	LMP2 Pro-Am	47	(Switzerland) CLX Motorsport	(Austria) Ferdinand Habsburg (Greece) Georgios Kolovos (France) Charles Milesi	Oreca 07	G	126	+1:27.745
11	LMP2 Pro-Am	47	(Switzerland) CLX Motorsport	(Austria) Ferdinand Habsburg (Greece) Georgios Kolovos (France) Charles Milesi	Gibson GK428 4.2 L V8	G	126	+1:27.745
12	LMP2 Pro-Am	30	(France) Duqueine Team	(France) Doriane Pin (Italy) Giorgio Roda (Netherlands) Richard Verschoor	Oreca 07	G	126	+1:28.529
12	LMP2 Pro-Am	30	(France) Duqueine Team	(France) Doriane Pin (Italy) Giorgio Roda (Netherlands) Richard Verschoor	Gibson GK428 4.2 L V8	G	126	+1:28.529
13	LMP2	34	(Poland) Inter Europol Competition	(France) Reshad de Gerus (United States) Bijoy Garg	Oreca 07	G	125	+1 Lap
13	LMP2	34	(Poland) Inter Europol Competition	(France) Reshad de Gerus (United States) Bijoy Garg	Gibson GK428 4.2 L V8	G	125	+1 Lap
14	LMP2	9	(Germany) Proton Competition	(United Kingdom) Sebastian Priaulx (Germany) Jonas Ried (Germany) Mike Rockenfeller	Oreca 07	G	125	+1 Lap
14	LMP2	9	(Germany) Proton Competition	(United Kingdom) Sebastian Priaulx (Germany) Jonas Ried (Germany) Mike Rockenfeller	Gibson GK428 4.2 L V8	G	125	+1 Lap
15	LMP2 Pro-Am	3	(Luxembourg) DKR Engineering	(France) Macéo Capietto (Belgium) Jean Glorieux (France) Marlon Hernandez	Oreca 07	G	125	+1 Lap
15	LMP2 Pro-Am	3	(Luxembourg) DKR Engineering	(France) Macéo Capietto (Belgium) Jean Glorieux (France) Marlon Hernandez	Gibson GK428 4.2 L V8	G	125	+1 Lap
16	LMP2 Pro-Am	99	(United States) AO by TF	(United States) Dane Cameron (Switzerland) Louis Delétraz (United States) P. J. Hyett	Oreca 07	G	125	+1 Lap
16	LMP2 Pro-Am	99	(United States) AO by TF	(United States) Dane Cameron (Switzerland) Louis Delétraz (United States) P. J. Hyett	Gibson GK428 4.2 L V8	G	125	+1 Lap
17	LMP2	37	(Switzerland) CLX Motorsport	(Mexico) Ian Aguilera (France) Adrien Closmenil (Denmark) Theodor Jensen	Oreca 07	G	125	+1 Lap
17	LMP2	37	(Switzerland) CLX Motorsport	(Mexico) Ian Aguilera (France) Adrien Closmenil (Denmark) Theodor Jensen	Gibson GK428 4.2 L V8	G	125	+1 Lap
18	LMP2	43	(Poland) Inter Europol Competition	(France) Tom Dillmann (Poland) Jakub Śmiechowski (United Kingdom) Nick Yelloly	Oreca 07	G	125	+1 Lap
18	LMP2	43	(Poland) Inter Europol Competition	(France) Tom Dillmann (Poland) Jakub Śmiechowski (United Kingdom) Nick Yelloly	Gibson GK428 4.2 L V8	G	125	+1 Lap
19	LMP2 Pro-Am	88	(Germany) Proton Competition	(Austria) René Binder (Austria) Horst Felbermayr Jr. (Austria) Horst Felix Felbermayr	Oreca 07	G	124	+2 Laps
19	LMP2 Pro-Am	88	(Germany) Proton Competition	(Austria) René Binder (Austria) Horst Felbermayr Jr. (Austria) Horst Felix Felbermayr	Gibson GK428 4.2 L V8	G	124	+2 Laps
20	LMP2 Pro-Am	27	(United Kingdom) Nielsen Racing	(Australia) James Allen (Greece) Kriton Lendoudis (United Kingdom) Alex Quinn	Oreca 07	G	121	+5 Laps
20	LMP2 Pro-Am	27	(United Kingdom) Nielsen Racing	(Australia) James Allen (Greece) Kriton Lendoudis (United Kingdom) Alex Quinn	Gibson GK428 4.2 L V8	G	121	+5 Laps
21	LMP2	28	(France) IDEC Sport	(France) Paul-Loup Chatin (France) Paul Lafargue (Netherlands) Job van Uitert	Oreca 07	G	121	+5 Laps
21	LMP2	28	(France) IDEC Sport	(France) Paul-Loup Chatin (France) Paul Lafargue (Netherlands) Job van Uitert	Gibson GK428 4.2 L V8	G	121	+5 Laps
22	**LMP3**	**17**	**(Switzerland) CLX Motorsport**	**(France) Louis Iglesias** **(France) Paul Lanchère** **(Brazil) Alexander Jacoby**	**Ligier JS P325**	M	**119**	**+7 Laps‡**
22	**LMP3**	**17**	**(Switzerland) CLX Motorsport**	**(France) Louis Iglesias** **(France) Paul Lanchère** **(Brazil) Alexander Jacoby**	**Toyota V35A-FTS 3.5 L Turbo V6**	M	**119**	**+7 Laps‡**
23	**LMGT3**	**33**	**(United Kingdom) TF Sport**	**(Republic of Ireland) Charlie Eastwood** **(United States) Blake McDonald** **(United States) Alec Udell**	**Chevrolet Corvette Z06 GT3.R**	G	**119**	**+7 Laps‡**
23	**LMGT3**	**33**	**(United Kingdom) TF Sport**	**(Republic of Ireland) Charlie Eastwood** **(United States) Blake McDonald** **(United States) Alec Udell**	**Chevrolet LT6.R 5.5 L V8**	G	**119**	**+7 Laps‡**
24	LMGT3	62	Team Qatar by Iron Lynx	(Qatar) Abdulla Al-Khelaifi (Germany) Julian Hanses (Belgium) Maxime Martin	Mercedes-AMG GT3 Evo	G	119	+7 Laps
24	LMGT3	62	Team Qatar by Iron Lynx	(Qatar) Abdulla Al-Khelaifi (Germany) Julian Hanses (Belgium) Maxime Martin	Mercedes-AMG M159 6.2 L V8	G	119	+7 Laps
25	LMP3	5	(Germany) Rinaldi Racing	(Portugal) José Cautela (Denmark) Mikkel Gaarde Pedersen (Italy) Alvise Rodella	Ligier JS P325	M	119	+7 Laps
25	LMP3	5	(Germany) Rinaldi Racing	(Portugal) José Cautela (Denmark) Mikkel Gaarde Pedersen (Italy) Alvise Rodella	Toyota V35A-FTS 3.5 L Turbo V6	M	119	+7 Laps
26	LMP3	8	(Poland) Team Virage	(Spain) Daniel Nogales (Italy) Matteo Quintarelli (France) Louis Stern	Ligier JS P325	M	119	+7 Laps
26	LMP3	8	(Poland) Team Virage	(Spain) Daniel Nogales (Italy) Matteo Quintarelli (France) Louis Stern	Toyota V35A-FTS 3.5 L Turbo V6	M	119	+7 Laps
27	LMGT3	77	(Germany) Proton Competition	(Netherlands) Huub van Eijndhoven (United Kingdom) Harry King (Japan) "Bankcy"	Porsche 911 GT3 R (992.2)	G	119	+7 Laps
27	LMGT3	77	(Germany) Proton Competition	(Netherlands) Huub van Eijndhoven (United Kingdom) Harry King (Japan) "Bankcy"	Porsche M97/80 4.2 L Flat-6	G	119	+7 Laps
28	LMGT3	75	(Germany) Proton Competition	(United States) Matt Kurzejewski (Austria) Richard Lietz (Australia) Tom Sargent	Porsche 911 GT3 R (992.2)	G	119	+7 Laps
28	LMGT3	75	(Germany) Proton Competition	(United States) Matt Kurzejewski (Austria) Richard Lietz (Australia) Tom Sargent	Porsche M97/80 4.2 L Flat-6	G	119	+7 Laps
29	LMP3	11	(Italy) EuroInternational	(United Kingdom) Matthew Richard Bell (Belgium) Douwe Dedecker (Netherlands) Max van der Snel	Ligier JS P325	M	119	+7 Laps
29	LMP3	11	(Italy) EuroInternational	(United Kingdom) Matthew Richard Bell (Belgium) Douwe Dedecker (Netherlands) Max van der Snel	Toyota V35A-FTS 3.5 L Turbo V6	M	119	+7 Laps
30	LMP3	4	(Luxembourg) DKR Engineering	(United States) Wyatt Brichacek (France) Romain Favre (Estonia) Antti Rammo	Ligier JS P325	M	119	+7 Laps
30	LMP3	4	(Luxembourg) DKR Engineering	(United States) Wyatt Brichacek (France) Romain Favre (Estonia) Antti Rammo	Toyota V35A-FTS 3.5 L Turbo V6	M	119	+7 Laps
31	LMGT3	54	(Denmark) High Class Racing	(Austria) Klaus Bachler (Denmark) Anders Fjordbach (Germany) Max Moritz	Porsche 911 GT3 R (992.2)	G	119	+7 Laps
31	LMGT3	54	(Denmark) High Class Racing	(Austria) Klaus Bachler (Denmark) Anders Fjordbach (Germany) Max Moritz	Porsche M97/80 4.2 L Flat-6	G	119	+7 Laps
32	LMP3	31	(France) Racing Spirit of Léman	(Switzerland) Ralph Meichtry (Germany) Lenny Ried (Switzerland) Grégory de Sybourg	Ligier JS P325	M	119	+7 Laps
32	LMP3	31	(France) Racing Spirit of Léman	(Switzerland) Ralph Meichtry (Germany) Lenny Ried (Switzerland) Grégory de Sybourg	Toyota V35A-FTS 3.5 L Turbo V6	M	119	+7 Laps
33	LMGT3	51	(Italy) AF Corse	(Denmark) Conrad Laursen (Italy) Davide Rigon (France) Charles-Henri Samani	Ferrari 296 GT3 Evo	G	119	+7 Laps
33	LMGT3	51	(Italy) AF Corse	(Denmark) Conrad Laursen (Italy) Davide Rigon (France) Charles-Henri Samani	Ferrari F163CE 3.0 L Turbo V6	G	119	+7 Laps
34	LMGT3	86	(United Kingdom) GR Racing	(United Kingdom) Lorcan Hanafin (Netherlands) Mex Jansen (United Kingdom) Michael Wainwright	Ferrari 296 GT3 Evo	G	119	+7 Laps
34	LMGT3	86	(United Kingdom) GR Racing	(United Kingdom) Lorcan Hanafin (Netherlands) Mex Jansen (United Kingdom) Michael Wainwright	Ferrari F163CE 3.0 L Turbo V6	G	119	+7 Laps
35	LMGT3	50	(Italy) Richard Mille AF Corse	(Italy) Riccardo Agostini (Brazil) Custodio Toledo (France) Lilou Wadoux	Ferrari 296 GT3 Evo	G	118	+8 Laps
35	LMGT3	50	(Italy) Richard Mille AF Corse	(Italy) Riccardo Agostini (Brazil) Custodio Toledo (France) Lilou Wadoux	Ferrari F163CE 3.0 L Turbo V6	G	118	+8 Laps
36	LMP3	35	(France) Ultimate	(Brazil) Lucas Fecury (Denmark) Sebastian Gravlund (United Kingdom) Terrence Woodward	Ligier JS P325	M	118	+8 Laps
36	LMP3	35	(France) Ultimate	(Brazil) Lucas Fecury (Denmark) Sebastian Gravlund (United Kingdom) Terrence Woodward	Toyota V35A-FTS 3.5 L Turbo V6	M	118	+8 Laps
37	LMGT3	55	(Switzerland) Spirit of Race	(United Kingdom) Duncan Cameron (Republic of Ireland) Matt Griffin (South Africa) David Perel	Ferrari 296 GT3 Evo	G	118	+8 Laps
37	LMGT3	55	(Switzerland) Spirit of Race	(United Kingdom) Duncan Cameron (Republic of Ireland) Matt Griffin (South Africa) David Perel	Ferrari F163CE 3.0 L Turbo V6	G	118	+8 Laps
38	LMGT3	74	(Switzerland) Kessel Racing	(United Kingdom) Andrew Gilbert (France) Romain Leroux (Spain) Fran Rueda	Ferrari 296 GT3 Evo	G	118	+8 Laps
38	LMGT3	74	(Switzerland) Kessel Racing	(United Kingdom) Andrew Gilbert (France) Romain Leroux (Spain) Fran Rueda	Ferrari F163CE 3.0 L Turbo V6	G	118	+8 Laps
39	LMP3	85	(France) R-ace GP	(France) Fabien Michal (Luxembourg) Pierre-Alexandre Provost (Germany) Hugo Schwarze	Duqueine D09	M	118	+8 Laps
39	LMP3	85	(France) R-ace GP	(France) Fabien Michal (Luxembourg) Pierre-Alexandre Provost (Germany) Hugo Schwarze	Toyota V35A-FTS 3.5 L Turbo V6	M	118	+8 Laps
40	LMP3	68	(France) M Racing	(United Kingdom) Nick Adcock (France) Thomas Imbourg (France) Quentin Antonel	Ligier JS P325	M	118	+8 Laps
40	LMP3	68	(France) M Racing	(United Kingdom) Nick Adcock (France) Thomas Imbourg (France) Quentin Antonel	Toyota V35A-FTS 3.5 L Turbo V6	M	118	+8 Laps
41	LMGT3	57	(Switzerland) Kessel Racing	(France) Mathys Jaubert (Japan) Takeshi Kimura (Brazil) Daniel Serra	Ferrari 296 GT3 Evo	G	117	+9 Laps
41	LMGT3	57	(Switzerland) Kessel Racing	(France) Mathys Jaubert (Japan) Takeshi Kimura (Brazil) Daniel Serra	Ferrari F163CE 3.0 L Turbo V6	G	117	+9 Laps
42	LMP3	13	(Poland) Inter Europol Competition	(United Arab Emirates) Alexander Bukhantsov (Chinese Taipei) Chun-Ting Chou (Colombia) Henry Cubides Olarte	Ligier JS P325	M	109	+17 Laps
42	LMP3	13	(Poland) Inter Europol Competition	(United Arab Emirates) Alexander Bukhantsov (Chinese Taipei) Chun-Ting Chou (Colombia) Henry Cubides Olarte	Toyota V35A-FTS 3.5 L Turbo V6	M	109	+17 Laps
Not classified
	LMGT3	23	(United Kingdom) United Autosports	(United Kingdom) Michael Birch (United Kingdom) Wayne Boyd (Australia) Garnet Patterson	McLaren 720S GT3 Evo	G	70	Did not finish
	LMGT3	23	(United Kingdom) United Autosports	(United Kingdom) Michael Birch (United Kingdom) Wayne Boyd (Australia) Garnet Patterson	McLaren M840T 4.0 L Turbo V8	G	70	Did not finish
	LMP2 Pro-Am	14	(France) TDS Racing	(United States) Scott Huffaker (France) Sami Meguetounif (United States) Steven Thomas	Oreca 07	G	55	Contact
	LMP2 Pro-Am	14	(France) TDS Racing	(United States) Scott Huffaker (France) Sami Meguetounif (United States) Steven Thomas	Gibson GK428 4.2 L V8	G	55	Contact
	LMGT3	63	(Italy) Iron Lynx	(Angola) Rui Andrade (Zimbabwe) Ameerh Naran (Brazil) Sérgio Sette Câmara	Mercedes-AMG GT3 Evo	G	51	Contact
	LMGT3	63	(Italy) Iron Lynx	(Angola) Rui Andrade (Zimbabwe) Ameerh Naran (Brazil) Sérgio Sette Câmara	Mercedes-AMG M159 6.2 L V8	G	51	Contact
	LMGT3	59	(France) Racing Spirit of Léman	(France) Marius Fossard (France) Valentin Hasse-Clot (France) Clément Mateu	Aston Martin Vantage AMR GT3 Evo	G	51	Contact
	LMGT3	59	(France) Racing Spirit of Léman	(France) Marius Fossard (France) Valentin Hasse-Clot (France) Clément Mateu	Aston Martin M177 4.0 L Turbo V8	G	51	Contact
	LMP2	10	(United Kingdom) Vector Sport	(Republic of Ireland) Ryan Cullen (Brazil) Pietro Fittipaldi (France) Vladislav Lomko	Oreca 07	G	126	Disqualified
	LMP2	10	(United Kingdom) Vector Sport	(Republic of Ireland) Ryan Cullen (Brazil) Pietro Fittipaldi (France) Vladislav Lomko	Gibson GK428 4.2 L V8	G	126	Disqualified

=== Statistics ===
==== Fastest lap ====
Class	No.	Entrant	Driver	Time	Lap
LMP2	29	(France) Forestier Racing by Panis	(France) Esteban Masson	1:32.791	32
LMP2 Pro-Am	3	(Luxembourg) DKR Engineering	(France) Macéo Capietto	1:32.735	11
LMP3	17	(Switzerland) CLX Motorsport	(France) Louis Iglesias	1:40.442	20
LMGT3	23	(United Kingdom) United Autosports	(United Kingdom) Wayne Boyd	1:42.796	4

European Le Mans Series
Previous race: 4 Hours of Le Castellet	2026 season	Next race: 4 Hours of Spa-Francorchamps
