= 2026 4 Hours of Le Castellet (ELMS) =

Endurance sportscar racing event

The layout of Circuit Paul Ricard

The 2026 4 Hours of Le Castellet was an endurance sportscar racing event, held between 1 and 3 May 2026 at Circuit Paul Ricard in Le Castellet, France. It was the second of six rounds of the 2026 European Le Mans Series season, and the fifteenth consecutive running of the event as part of the championship.

== Entry list ==
The provisional entry list was published on 22 April 2026 and consisted of 47 entries across 4 categories – 11 in LMP2, 12 in LMP2 Pro-Am, 10 in LMP3, and 14 in LMGT3. In LMP2, Jonny Edgar filled in for Louis Delétraz in the No. 99 TF by AO Oreca while Luca Ghiotto replaced Nick Yelloly in the No. 43 Inter Europol Competition Oreca due to clash with the IMSA Sportscar Championship round at Laguna Seca.

Another driver at Laguna Seca was Harry King, who was replaced by Joel Sturm in the LMGT3 No. 77 Proton Competition Porsche. Elsewhere in LMGT3, Lilou Wadoux returned to the No. 50 AF Corse Ferrari and Maxime Martin to the No. 62 Team Qatar by Iron Lynx Mercedes-AMG following a clash with the opening round of the GT World Challenge Europe Endurance Cup at Circuit Paul Ricard.

== Schedule ==
Date	Time (local: CEST)	Event
Friday, 1 May	11:50	Free Practice 1
Friday, 1 May	16:20	Bronze Driver Collective Test
Saturday, 2 May	10:10	Free Practice 2
Saturday, 2 May	15:10	Qualifying – LMGT3
Saturday, 2 May	15:32	Qualifying – LMP3
Saturday, 2 May	15:54	Qualifying – LMP2 Pro-Am
Saturday, 2 May	16:16	Qualifying – LMP2
Sunday, 3 May	12:00	Race

== Free practice ==
Two practice sessions were held before the event: one on Friday and one on Saturday. Both sessions ran for 90 minutes.

=== Practice 1 ===
The first practice session started at 11:50 CEST on Friday.

Class	No.	Entrant	Driver	Time
LMP2	28	(France) IDEC Sport	(Netherlands) Job van Uitert	1:50.086
LMP2 Pro-Am	83	(Italy) AF Corse	(France) Matthieu Vaxivière	1:50.280
LMP3	11	(Italy) EuroInternational	(Netherlands) Max van der Snel	2:00.128
LMGT3	57	(Switzerland) Kessel Racing	(Brazil) Daniel Serra	2:03.164

- Note: Only the fastest car in each class is shown.

=== Practice 2 ===
The second practice session started at 10:10 CEST on Saturday.

Class	No.	Entrant	Driver	Time
LMP2	29	(France) Forestier Racing by Panis	(France) Esteban Masson	1:49.660
LMP2 Pro-Am	30	(Italy) Duqueine Team	(France) Doriane Pin	1:50.605
LMP3	85	(France) R-ace GP	(Luxembourg) Pierre-Alexandre Provost	2:00.441
LMGT3	57	(Switzerland) Kessel Racing	(France) Mathys Jaubert	2:02.986

- Note: Only the fastest car in each class is shown.

== Qualifying ==
Qualifying started at 15:10 CEST on Saturday, with four sessions of fifteen minutes each, one session for each class.

=== Qualifying results ===
Pole position winners in each class are marked in bold.

== Race ==
The race started at 12:00 CEST on Sunday, and ran for 4 hours. The race was won by the No. 22 United Autosports Oreca 07, driven by Ben Hanley, Griffin Peebles and Grégoire Saucy.

=== Race results ===
The minimum number of laps for classification (70% of overall winning car's distance) was 79 laps. Class winners are in bold and ‡.

Pos	Class	No	Team	Drivers	Chassis	Tyre	Laps	Time/Retired
Pos	Class	No	Team	Drivers	Engine	Tyre	Laps	Time/Retired
1	**LMP2**	**22**	**(United Kingdom) United Autosports**	**(United Kingdom) Ben Hanley** **(Australia) Griffin Peebles** **(Switzerland) Grégoire Saucy**	**Oreca 07**	G	**112**	**4:00:01.773‡**
1	**LMP2**	**22**	**(United Kingdom) United Autosports**	**(United Kingdom) Ben Hanley** **(Australia) Griffin Peebles** **(Switzerland) Grégoire Saucy**	**Gibson GK428 4.2 L V8**	G	**112**	**4:00:01.773‡**
2	LMP2	34	(Poland) Inter Europol Competition	(France) Reshad de Gerus (United States) Bijoy Garg	Oreca 07	G	112	+8.569
2	LMP2	34	(Poland) Inter Europol Competition	(France) Reshad de Gerus (United States) Bijoy Garg	Gibson GK428 4.2 L V8	G	112	+8.569
3	LMP2	28	(France) IDEC Sport	(France) Paul-Loup Chatin (France) Paul Lafargue (Netherlands) Job van Uitert	Oreca 07	G	112	+9.498
3	LMP2	28	(France) IDEC Sport	(France) Paul-Loup Chatin (France) Paul Lafargue (Netherlands) Job van Uitert	Gibson GK428 4.2 L V8	G	112	+9.498
4	LMP2	18	(France) IDEC Sport	(United Kingdom) Jamie Chadwick (Germany) Laurents Hörr (Italy) Valerio Rinicella	Oreca 07	G	112	+12.001
4	LMP2	18	(France) IDEC Sport	(United Kingdom) Jamie Chadwick (Germany) Laurents Hörr (Italy) Valerio Rinicella	Gibson GK428 4.2 L V8	G	112	+12.001
5	LMP2	10	(United Kingdom) Vector Sport	(Republic of Ireland) Ryan Cullen (Brazil) Pietro Fittipaldi (France) Vladislav Lomko	Oreca 07	G	112	+12.796
5	LMP2	10	(United Kingdom) Vector Sport	(Republic of Ireland) Ryan Cullen (Brazil) Pietro Fittipaldi (France) Vladislav Lomko	Gibson GK428 4.2 L V8	G	112	+12.796
6	LMP2	37	(Switzerland) CLX Motorsport	(Mexico) Ian Aguilera (France) Adrien Closmenil (Denmark) Theodor Jensen	Oreca 07	G	112	+14.284
6	LMP2	37	(Switzerland) CLX Motorsport	(Mexico) Ian Aguilera (France) Adrien Closmenil (Denmark) Theodor Jensen	Gibson GK428 4.2 L V8	G	112	+14.284
7	LMP2	43	(Poland) Inter Europol Competition	(France) Tom Dillmann (Italy) Luca Ghiotto (Poland) Jakub Śmiechowski	Oreca 07	G	112	+14.758
7	LMP2	43	(Poland) Inter Europol Competition	(France) Tom Dillmann (Italy) Luca Ghiotto (Poland) Jakub Śmiechowski	Gibson GK428 4.2 L V8	G	112	+14.758
8	**LMP2 Pro-Am**	**27**	**(United Kingdom) Nielsen Racing**	**(Australia) James Allen** **(Greece) Kriton Lendoudis** **(United Kingdom) Alex Quinn**	**Oreca 07**	G	**112**	**+23.971‡**
8	**LMP2 Pro-Am**	**27**	**(United Kingdom) Nielsen Racing**	**(Australia) James Allen** **(Greece) Kriton Lendoudis** **(United Kingdom) Alex Quinn**	**Gibson GK428 4.2 L V8**	G	**112**	**+23.971‡**
9	LMP2 Pro-Am	99	(United States) AO by TF	(United States) Dane Cameron (United Kingdom) Jonny Edgar (United States) P. J. Hyett	Oreca 07	G	112	+29.722
9	LMP2 Pro-Am	99	(United States) AO by TF	(United States) Dane Cameron (United Kingdom) Jonny Edgar (United States) P. J. Hyett	Gibson GK428 4.2 L V8	G	112	+29.722
10	LMP2 Pro-Am	30	(France) Duqueine Team	(France) Doriane Pin (Italy) Giorgio Roda (Netherlands) Richard Verschoor	Oreca 07	G	112	+37.612
10	LMP2 Pro-Am	30	(France) Duqueine Team	(France) Doriane Pin (Italy) Giorgio Roda (Netherlands) Richard Verschoor	Gibson GK428 4.2 L V8	G	112	+37.612
11	LMP2	9	(Germany) Proton Competition	(United Kingdom) Sebastian Priaulx (Germany) Jonas Ried (Germany) Mike Rockenfeller	Oreca 07	G	112	+43.913
11	LMP2	9	(Germany) Proton Competition	(United Kingdom) Sebastian Priaulx (Germany) Jonas Ried (Germany) Mike Rockenfeller	Gibson GK428 4.2 L V8	G	112	+43.913
12	LMP2 Pro-Am	14	(France) TDS Racing	(United States) Scott Huffaker (France) Sami Meguetounif (United States) Steven Thomas	Oreca 07	G	112	+48.617
12	LMP2 Pro-Am	14	(France) TDS Racing	(United States) Scott Huffaker (France) Sami Meguetounif (United States) Steven Thomas	Gibson GK428 4.2 L V8	G	112	+48.617
13	LMP2 Pro-Am	7	(United Kingdom) Vector Sport	(Turkey) Cem Bölükbaşı (Spain) Lorenzo Fluxá (Denmark) Jens Reno Møller	Oreca 07	G	112	+49.149
13	LMP2 Pro-Am	7	(United Kingdom) Vector Sport	(Turkey) Cem Bölükbaşı (Spain) Lorenzo Fluxá (Denmark) Jens Reno Møller	Gibson GK428 4.2 L V8	G	112	+49.149
14	LMP2 Pro-Am	83	(Italy) AF Corse	(Italy) Antonio Fuoco (France) François Perrodo (France) Matthieu Vaxivière	Oreca 07	G	112	+52.426
14	LMP2 Pro-Am	83	(Italy) AF Corse	(Italy) Antonio Fuoco (France) François Perrodo (France) Matthieu Vaxivière	Gibson GK428 4.2 L V8	G	112	+52.426
15	LMP2 Pro-Am	19	(United Arab Emirates) Rossa Racing by Virage	(Portugal) Manuel Espírito Santo (United States) John Falb (Netherlands) Rik Koen	Oreca 07	G	112	+53.447
15	LMP2 Pro-Am	19	(United Arab Emirates) Rossa Racing by Virage	(Portugal) Manuel Espírito Santo (United States) John Falb (Netherlands) Rik Koen	Gibson GK428 4.2 L V8	G	112	+53.447
16	LMP2 Pro-Am	21	(United Kingdom) United Autosports	(United Kingdom) Oliver Jarvis (Japan) Marino Sato (Brazil) Daniel Schneider	Oreca 07	G	112	+54.177
16	LMP2 Pro-Am	21	(United Kingdom) United Autosports	(United Kingdom) Oliver Jarvis (Japan) Marino Sato (Brazil) Daniel Schneider	Gibson GK428 4.2 L V8	G	112	+54.177
17	LMP2 Pro-Am	47	(Switzerland) CLX Motorsport	(Austria) Ferdinand Habsburg (Greece) Georgios Kolovos (France) Charles Milesi	Oreca 07	G	112	+54.346
17	LMP2 Pro-Am	47	(Switzerland) CLX Motorsport	(Austria) Ferdinand Habsburg (Greece) Georgios Kolovos (France) Charles Milesi	Gibson GK428 4.2 L V8	G	112	+54.346
18	LMP2 Pro-Am	3	(Luxembourg) DKR Engineering	(Mexico) Sebastián Álvarez (Belgium) Jean Glorieux (France) Marlon Hernandez	Oreca 07	G	112	+57.353
18	LMP2 Pro-Am	3	(Luxembourg) DKR Engineering	(Mexico) Sebastián Álvarez (Belgium) Jean Glorieux (France) Marlon Hernandez	Gibson GK428 4.2 L V8	G	112	+57.353
19	LMP2 Pro-Am	20	(Portugal) Algarve Pro Racing	(Denmark) Malthe Jakobsen (Denmark) Michael Jensen (Italy) Enzo Trulli	Oreca 07	G	111	+1 Lap
19	LMP2 Pro-Am	20	(Portugal) Algarve Pro Racing	(Denmark) Malthe Jakobsen (Denmark) Michael Jensen (Italy) Enzo Trulli	Gibson GK428 4.2 L V8	G	111	+1 Lap
20	LMP2	25	(Portugal) Algarve Pro Racing	(United Kingdom) Jake Hughes (Liechtenstein) Matthias Kaiser (France) Tristan Vautier	Oreca 07	G	111	+1 Lap
20	LMP2	25	(Portugal) Algarve Pro Racing	(United Kingdom) Jake Hughes (Liechtenstein) Matthias Kaiser (France) Tristan Vautier	Gibson GK428 4.2 L V8	G	111	+1 Lap
21	LMP2 Pro-Am	88	(Germany) Proton Competition	(Austria) René Binder (Austria) Horst Felbermayr Jr. (Austria) Horst Felix Felbermayr	Oreca 07	G	111	+1 Lap
21	LMP2 Pro-Am	88	(Germany) Proton Competition	(Austria) René Binder (Austria) Horst Felbermayr Jr. (Austria) Horst Felix Felbermayr	Gibson GK428 4.2 L V8	G	111	+1 Lap
22	LMP2	24	(United Kingdom) Nielsen Racing	(Australia) Jack Doohan (Israel) Roy Nissany (United Kingdom) Edward Pearson	Oreca 07	G	110	+2 Laps
22	LMP2	24	(United Kingdom) Nielsen Racing	(Australia) Jack Doohan (Israel) Roy Nissany (United Kingdom) Edward Pearson	Gibson GK428 4.2 L V8	G	110	+2 Laps
23	**LMP3**	**13**	**(Poland) Inter Europol Competition**	**(United Arab Emirates) Alexander Bukhantsov** **(Chinese Taipei) Chun-Ting Chou** **(Colombia) Henry Cubides Olarte**	**Ligier JS P325**	M	**104**	**+8 Laps‡**
23	**LMP3**	**13**	**(Poland) Inter Europol Competition**	**(United Arab Emirates) Alexander Bukhantsov** **(Chinese Taipei) Chun-Ting Chou** **(Colombia) Henry Cubides Olarte**	**Toyota V35A-FTS 3.5 L Turbo V6**	M	**104**	**+8 Laps‡**
24	LMP3	68	(France) M Racing	(United Kingdom) Nick Adcock (France) Thomas Imbourg (France) Quentin Antonel	Ligier JS P325	M	104	+8 Laps
24	LMP3	68	(France) M Racing	(United Kingdom) Nick Adcock (France) Thomas Imbourg (France) Quentin Antonel	Toyota V35A-FTS 3.5 L Turbo V6	M	104	+8 Laps
25	LMP3	4	(Luxembourg) DKR Engineering	(United States) Wyatt Brichacek (France) Romain Favre (Estonia) Antti Rammo	Ligier JS P325	M	104	+8 Laps
25	LMP3	4	(Luxembourg) DKR Engineering	(United States) Wyatt Brichacek (France) Romain Favre (Estonia) Antti Rammo	Toyota V35A-FTS 3.5 L Turbo V6	M	104	+8 Laps
26	LMP3	35	(France) Ultimate	(Brazil) Lucas Fecury (Denmark) Sebastian Gravlund (United Kingdom) Terrence Woodward	Ligier JS P325	M	104	+8 Laps
26	LMP3	35	(France) Ultimate	(Brazil) Lucas Fecury (Denmark) Sebastian Gravlund (United Kingdom) Terrence Woodward	Toyota V35A-FTS 3.5 L Turbo V6	M	104	+8 Laps
27	LMP3	17	(Switzerland) CLX Motorsport	(France) Paul Lanchère (Brazil) Alexander Jacoby (Brazil) Bruno Ribeiro	Ligier JS P325	M	104	+8 Laps
27	LMP3	17	(Switzerland) CLX Motorsport	(France) Paul Lanchère (Brazil) Alexander Jacoby (Brazil) Bruno Ribeiro	Toyota V35A-FTS 3.5 L Turbo V6	M	104	+8 Laps
28	LMP3	85	(France) R-ace GP	(France) Fabien Michal (Luxembourg) Pierre-Alexandre Provost (Germany) Hugo Schwarze	Duqueine D09	M	104	+8 Laps
28	LMP3	85	(France) R-ace GP	(France) Fabien Michal (Luxembourg) Pierre-Alexandre Provost (Germany) Hugo Schwarze	Toyota V35A-FTS 3.5 L Turbo V6	M	104	+8 Laps
29	LMP3	5	(Germany) Rinaldi Racing	(Portugal) José Cautela (Denmark) Mikkel Gaarde Pedersen (Italy) Alvise Rodella	Ligier JS P325	M	104	+8 Laps
29	LMP3	5	(Germany) Rinaldi Racing	(Portugal) José Cautela (Denmark) Mikkel Gaarde Pedersen (Italy) Alvise Rodella	Toyota V35A-FTS 3.5 L Turbo V6	M	104	+8 Laps
30	LMP3	8	(Poland) Team Virage	(Spain) Daniel Nogales (Italy) Matteo Quintarelli (France) Louis Stern	Ligier JS P325	M	104	+8 Laps
30	LMP3	8	(Poland) Team Virage	(Spain) Daniel Nogales (Italy) Matteo Quintarelli (France) Louis Stern	Toyota V35A-FTS 3.5 L Turbo V6	M	104	+8 Laps
31	**LMGT3**	**57**	**(Switzerland) Kessel Racing**	**(France) Mathys Jaubert** **(Japan) Takeshi Kimura** **(Brazil) Daniel Serra**	**Ferrari 296 GT3 Evo**	G	**103**	**+9 Laps‡**
31	**LMGT3**	**57**	**(Switzerland) Kessel Racing**	**(France) Mathys Jaubert** **(Japan) Takeshi Kimura** **(Brazil) Daniel Serra**	**Ferrari F163CE 3.0 L Turbo V6**	G	**103**	**+9 Laps‡**
32	LMGT3	33	(United Kingdom) TF Sport	(Republic of Ireland) Charlie Eastwood (United States) Blake McDonald (United States) Alec Udell	Chevrolet Corvette Z06 GT3.R	G	103	+9 Laps
32	LMGT3	33	(United Kingdom) TF Sport	(Republic of Ireland) Charlie Eastwood (United States) Blake McDonald (United States) Alec Udell	Chevrolet LT6.R 5.5 L V8	G	103	+9 Laps
33	LMGT3	86	(United Kingdom) GR Racing	(United Kingdom) Lorcan Hanafin (Netherlands) Mex Jansen (United Kingdom) Michael Wainwright	Ferrari 296 GT3 Evo	G	103	+9 Laps
33	LMGT3	86	(United Kingdom) GR Racing	(United Kingdom) Lorcan Hanafin (Netherlands) Mex Jansen (United Kingdom) Michael Wainwright	Ferrari F163CE 3.0 L Turbo V6	G	103	+9 Laps
34	LMGT3	55	(Switzerland) Spirit of Race	(United Kingdom) Duncan Cameron (Republic of Ireland) Matt Griffin (South Africa) David Perel	Ferrari 296 GT3 Evo	G	103	+9 Laps
34	LMGT3	55	(Switzerland) Spirit of Race	(United Kingdom) Duncan Cameron (Republic of Ireland) Matt Griffin (South Africa) David Perel	Ferrari F163CE 3.0 L Turbo V6	G	103	+9 Laps
35	LMGT3	77	(Germany) Proton Competition	(Netherlands) Huub van Eijndhoven (Japan) "Bankcy" (Germany) Joel Sturm	Porsche 911 GT3 R (992.2)	G	103	+9 Laps
35	LMGT3	77	(Germany) Proton Competition	(Netherlands) Huub van Eijndhoven (Japan) "Bankcy" (Germany) Joel Sturm	Porsche M97/80 4.2 L Flat-6	G	103	+9 Laps
36	LMGT3	63	(Italy) Iron Lynx	(Angola) Rui Andrade (Zimbabwe) Ameerh Naran (Brazil) Sérgio Sette Câmara	Mercedes-AMG GT3 Evo	G	102	+10 Laps
36	LMGT3	63	(Italy) Iron Lynx	(Angola) Rui Andrade (Zimbabwe) Ameerh Naran (Brazil) Sérgio Sette Câmara	Mercedes-AMG M159 6.2 L V8	G	102	+10 Laps
37	LMGT3	75	(Germany) Proton Competition	(United States) Matt Kurzejewski (Austria) Richard Lietz (Australia) Tom Sargent	Porsche 911 GT3 R (992.2)	G	102	+10 Laps
37	LMGT3	75	(Germany) Proton Competition	(United States) Matt Kurzejewski (Austria) Richard Lietz (Australia) Tom Sargent	Porsche M97/80 4.2 L Flat-6	G	102	+10 Laps
38	LMP3	31	(France) Racing Spirit of Léman	(Switzerland) Ralph Meichtry (Germany) Lenny Ried (Switzerland) Grégory de Sybourg	Ligier JS P325	M	102	+10 Laps
38	LMP3	31	(France) Racing Spirit of Léman	(Switzerland) Ralph Meichtry (Germany) Lenny Ried (Switzerland) Grégory de Sybourg	Toyota V35A-FTS 3.5 L Turbo V6	M	102	+10 Laps
39	LMGT3	54	(Denmark) High Class Racing	(Denmark) Anders Fjordbach (Germany) Max Moritz (Austria) Thomas Preining	Porsche 911 GT3 R (992.2)	G	102	+10 Laps
39	LMGT3	54	(Denmark) High Class Racing	(Denmark) Anders Fjordbach (Germany) Max Moritz (Austria) Thomas Preining	Porsche M97/80 4.2 L Flat-6	G	102	+10 Laps
40	LMGT3	59	(France) Racing Spirit of Léman	(France) Marius Fossard (France) Valentin Hasse-Clot (France) Clément Mateu	Aston Martin Vantage AMR GT3 Evo	G	102	+10 Laps
40	LMGT3	59	(France) Racing Spirit of Léman	(France) Marius Fossard (France) Valentin Hasse-Clot (France) Clément Mateu	Aston Martin M177 4.0 L Turbo V8	G	102	+10 Laps
Not classified
	LMP2	29	(France) Forestier Racing by Panis	(United Kingdom) Oliver Gray (France) Esteban Masson (France) Louis Rousset	Oreca 07	G	91	Sensor
	LMP2	29	(France) Forestier Racing by Panis	(United Kingdom) Oliver Gray (France) Esteban Masson (France) Louis Rousset	Gibson GK428 4.2 L V8	G	91	Sensor
	LMGT3	62	Team Qatar by Iron Lynx	(Qatar) Abdulla Al-Khelaifi (Germany) Julian Hanses (Belgium) Maxime Martin	Mercedes-AMG GT3 Evo	G	85	Collision damage
	LMGT3	62	Team Qatar by Iron Lynx	(Qatar) Abdulla Al-Khelaifi (Germany) Julian Hanses (Belgium) Maxime Martin	Mercedes-AMG M159 6.2 L V8	G	85	Collision damage
	LMGT3	74	(Switzerland) Kessel Racing	(United Kingdom) Andrew Gilbert (France) Romain Leroux (Spain) Fran Rueda	Ferrari 296 GT3 Evo	G	69	Wheel
	LMGT3	74	(Switzerland) Kessel Racing	(United Kingdom) Andrew Gilbert (France) Romain Leroux (Spain) Fran Rueda	Ferrari F163CE 3.0 L Turbo V6	G	69	Wheel
	LMGT3	23	(United Kingdom) United Autosports	(United Kingdom) Michael Birch (United Kingdom) Wayne Boyd (Australia) Garnet Patterson	McLaren 720S GT3 Evo	G	27	Mechanical
	LMGT3	23	(United Kingdom) United Autosports	(United Kingdom) Michael Birch (United Kingdom) Wayne Boyd (Australia) Garnet Patterson	McLaren M840T 4.0 L Turbo V8	G	27	Mechanical
	LMGT3	50	(Italy) Richard Mille AF Corse	(Italy) Riccardo Agostini (Brazil) Custodio Toledo (France) Lilou Wadoux	Ferrari 296 GT3 Evo	G	9	Collision
	LMGT3	50	(Italy) Richard Mille AF Corse	(Italy) Riccardo Agostini (Brazil) Custodio Toledo (France) Lilou Wadoux	Ferrari F163CE 3.0 L Turbo V6	G	9	Collision
	LMGT3	51	(Italy) AF Corse	(Denmark) Conrad Laursen (Italy) Davide Rigon (France) Charles-Henri Samani	Ferrari 296 GT3 Evo	G	103	Disqualified
	LMGT3	51	(Italy) AF Corse	(Denmark) Conrad Laursen (Italy) Davide Rigon (France) Charles-Henri Samani	Ferrari F163CE 3.0 L Turbo V6	G	103	Disqualified
	LMP3	11	(Italy) EuroInternational	(United Kingdom) Matthew Richard Bell (Belgium) Douwe Dedecker (Netherlands) Max van der Snel	Ligier JS P325	M	67	Disqualified
	LMP3	11	(Italy) EuroInternational	(United Kingdom) Matthew Richard Bell (Belgium) Douwe Dedecker (Netherlands) Max van der Snel	Toyota V35A-FTS 3.5 L Turbo V6	M	67	Disqualified

=== Statistics ===
==== Fastest lap ====
Class	No.	Entrant	Driver	Time	Lap
LMP2	22	(United Kingdom) United Autosports	(Australia) Griffin Peebles	1:50.468	6
LMP2 Pro-Am	20	(Portugal) Algarve Pro Racing	(Denmark) Malthe Jakobsen	1:50.686	12
LMP3	85	(France) R-ace GP	(Germany) Hugo Schwarze	2:00.709	26
LMGT3	59	(France) Racing Spirit of Léman	(France) Valentin Hasse-Clot	2:03.741	3

European Le Mans Series
Previous race: 4 Hours of Barcelona	2026 season	Next race: 4 Hours of Imola
