= 2026 European Le Mans Series =

European racing season

The 2026 European Le Mans Series was the twenty-third season of the Automobile Club de l'Ouest's (ACO) European Le Mans Series. The six-event season began at Circuit de Barcelona-Catalunya on 12 April and finished at Algarve International Circuit on 10 October.

The series was open to Le Mans Prototypes, divided into the LMP2 and LMP3 classes, and grand tourer-style racing cars in the LMGT3 class.

== Calendar ==
The provisional calendar for the 2026 season was announced on 28 August 2025. The calendar featured the same six circuits in the same order as the previous season.

In addition to the Le Mans Cup and Ligier European Series, the Eurocup-3 single-seater championship joined the support race lineup for the rounds at Circuit Paul Ricard, Imola Circuit and Silverstone Circuit.

Locations of the 2026 races

Rnd	Race	Circuit	Location	Date
	Prologue	Circuit de Barcelona-Catalunya	Montmeló, Spain	6/7 April
1	4 Hours of Barcelona	Circuit de Barcelona-Catalunya	Montmeló, Spain	12 April
2	4 Hours of Le Castellet	Circuit Paul Ricard	Le Castellet, France	3 May
3	4 Hours of Imola	Imola Circuit	Imola, Italy	5 July
4	4 Hours of Spa-Francorchamps	Circuit de Spa-Francorchamps	Stavelot, Belgium	23 August
5	Goodyear 4 Hours of Silverstone	Silverstone Circuit	Silverstone, United Kingdom	13 September
6	4 Hours of Portimão	Algarve International Circuit	Portimão, Portugal	10 October

== Entries ==
=== LMP2 ===
All cars in the LMP2 class use the Gibson GK428 V8 engine and Goodyear tyres. Entries in the LMP2 Pro-Am class, set aside for teams with a Bronze-rated driver in their line-up, are denoted with icons.

Entrant/Team	Chassis	No.	MISC	Drivers	Rounds
(Luxembourg) DKR Engineering	Oreca 07	3	PA	(Belgium) Jean Glorieux	All
(Luxembourg) DKR Engineering	Oreca 07	3	PA	(France) Marlon Hernandez	All
(Luxembourg) DKR Engineering	Oreca 07	3	PA	(Mexico) Sebastián Álvarez	1–2
(Luxembourg) DKR Engineering	Oreca 07	3	PA	(France) Macéo Capietto	3, 5
(Luxembourg) DKR Engineering	Oreca 07	3	PA	(France) Julien Andlauer	4
(Luxembourg) DKR Engineering	Oreca 07	3	PA	(France) Tristan Vautier	6
(United Kingdom) Vector Sport	Oreca 07	7	PA	(Turkey) Cem Bölükbaşı	All
(United Kingdom) Vector Sport	Oreca 07	7	PA	(Spain) Lorenzo Fluxá	All
(United Kingdom) Vector Sport	Oreca 07	7	PA	(Denmark) Jens Reno Møller	All
(United Kingdom) Vector Sport	Oreca 07	10	P2	(Republic of Ireland) Ryan Cullen	All
(United Kingdom) Vector Sport	Oreca 07	10	P2	(Brazil) Pietro Fittipaldi	All
(United Kingdom) Vector Sport	Oreca 07	10	P2	(France) Vladislav Lomko (Note: Lomko and Bukhantsov are Russian, but they competed under French and Emirati licences respectively as Russian national emblems were banned by the FIA following the Russian invasion of Ukraine. Although the ban was lifted on 13 August 2026, Lomko and Bukhantsov retained their foreign licences.)	All
(Germany) Proton Competition	Oreca 07	9	P2	(United Kingdom) Sebastian Priaulx	All
(Germany) Proton Competition	Oreca 07	9	P2	(Germany) Jonas Ried	All
(Germany) Proton Competition	Oreca 07	9	P2	(Germany) Mike Rockenfeller	All
(Germany) Proton Competition	Oreca 07	88	PA	(Austria) René Binder	All
(Germany) Proton Competition	Oreca 07	88	PA	(Austria) Horst Felbermayr Jr.	All
(Germany) Proton Competition	Oreca 07	88	PA	(Austria) Horst Felix Felbermayr	All
(France) TDS Racing	Oreca 07	14	PA	(United States) Scott Huffaker	All
(France) TDS Racing	Oreca 07	14	PA	(France) Sami Meguetounif	All
(France) TDS Racing	Oreca 07	14	PA	(United States) Steven Thomas	All
(France) Forestier Racing by Panis	Oreca 07	29	P2	(United Kingdom) Oliver Gray	All
(France) Forestier Racing by Panis	Oreca 07	29	P2	(France) Esteban Masson	All
(France) Forestier Racing by Panis	Oreca 07	29	P2	(France) Louis Rousset	All
(France) IDEC Sport	Oreca 07	18	P2	(United Kingdom) Jamie Chadwick	All
(France) IDEC Sport	Oreca 07	18	P2	(Germany) Laurents Hörr	All
(France) IDEC Sport	Oreca 07	18	P2	(Italy) Valerio Rinicella	All
(France) IDEC Sport	Oreca 07	28	P2	(France) Paul-Loup Chatin	All
(France) IDEC Sport	Oreca 07	28	P2	(France) Paul Lafargue	All
(France) IDEC Sport	Oreca 07	28	P2	(Netherlands) Job van Uitert	All
(United Arab Emirates) Rossa Racing by Virage	Oreca 07	19	PA	(Portugal) Manuel Espírito Santo	All
(United Arab Emirates) Rossa Racing by Virage	Oreca 07	19	PA	(United States) John Falb	All
(United Arab Emirates) Rossa Racing by Virage	Oreca 07	19	PA	(Netherlands) Rik Koen	All
(Portugal) Algarve Pro Racing	Oreca 07	20	PA	(Denmark) Malthe Jakobsen	All
(Portugal) Algarve Pro Racing	Oreca 07	20	PA	(Denmark) Michael Jensen	All
(Portugal) Algarve Pro Racing	Oreca 07	20	PA	(Italy) Enzo Trulli	All
(Portugal) Algarve Pro Racing	Oreca 07	25	P2	(United Kingdom) Jake Hughes	All
(Portugal) Algarve Pro Racing	Oreca 07	25	P2	(Liechtenstein) Matthias Kaiser	All
(Portugal) Algarve Pro Racing	Oreca 07	25	P2	(France) Tristan Vautier	1–4
(Portugal) Algarve Pro Racing	Oreca 07	25	P2	(United Kingdom) Ben Barnicoat	5
(Portugal) Algarve Pro Racing	Oreca 07	25	P2	(United Kingdom) Alex Lynn	6
(United Kingdom) United Autosports	Oreca 07	21	PA	(United Kingdom) Oliver Jarvis	All
(United Kingdom) United Autosports	Oreca 07	21	PA	(Japan) Marino Sato	All
(United Kingdom) United Autosports	Oreca 07	21	PA	(Brazil) Daniel Schneider	All
(United Kingdom) United Autosports	Oreca 07	22	P2	(United Kingdom) Ben Hanley	All
(United Kingdom) United Autosports	Oreca 07	22	P2	(Australia) Griffin Peebles	All
(United Kingdom) United Autosports	Oreca 07	22	P2	(Switzerland) Grégoire Saucy	All
(United Kingdom) Nielsen Racing	Oreca 07	24	P2	(Israel) Roy Nissany	All
(United Kingdom) Nielsen Racing	Oreca 07	24	P2	(United Kingdom) Edward Pearson	All
(United Kingdom) Nielsen Racing	Oreca 07	24	P2	(Australia) Jack Doohan	1–4
(United Kingdom) Nielsen Racing	Oreca 07	24	P2	(United Kingdom) Jack Aitken	5
(United Kingdom) Nielsen Racing	Oreca 07	24	P2	(Brazil) Pipo Derani	6
(United Kingdom) Nielsen Racing	Oreca 07	27	PA	(Australia) James Allen	All
(United Kingdom) Nielsen Racing	Oreca 07	27	PA	(Greece) Kriton Lendoudis	All
(United Kingdom) Nielsen Racing	Oreca 07	27	PA	(United Kingdom) Alex Quinn	All
(France) Duqueine Team	Oreca 07	30	PA	(France) Doriane Pin	All
(France) Duqueine Team	Oreca 07	30	PA	(Italy) Giorgio Roda	All
(France) Duqueine Team	Oreca 07	30	PA	(Netherlands) Richard Verschoor	All
(Poland) Inter Europol Competition	Oreca 07	34	P2	(France) Reshad de Gerus	All
(Poland) Inter Europol Competition	Oreca 07	34	P2	(United States) Bijoy Garg	All
(Poland) Inter Europol Competition	Oreca 07	43	P2	(France) Tom Dillmann	All
(Poland) Inter Europol Competition	Oreca 07	43	P2	(Poland) Jakub Śmiechowski	All
(Poland) Inter Europol Competition	Oreca 07	43	P2	(United Kingdom) Nick Yelloly	1, 3–6
(Poland) Inter Europol Competition	Oreca 07	43	P2	(Italy) Luca Ghiotto	2
(Switzerland) CLX Motorsport	Oreca 07	37	P2	(Mexico) Ian Aguilera	All
(Switzerland) CLX Motorsport	Oreca 07	37	P2	(France) Adrien Closmenil	All
(Switzerland) CLX Motorsport	Oreca 07	37	P2	(Denmark) Theodor Jensen	All
(Switzerland) CLX Motorsport	Oreca 07	47	PA	(Greece) Georgios Kolovos	All
(Switzerland) CLX Motorsport	Oreca 07	47	PA	(France) Charles Milesi	All
(Switzerland) CLX Motorsport	Oreca 07	47	PA	(Brazil) Felipe Fraga	1
(Switzerland) CLX Motorsport	Oreca 07	47	PA	(Austria) Ferdinand Habsburg	2–6
(Italy) AF Corse	Oreca 07	83	PA	(Italy) Antonio Fuoco	All
(Italy) AF Corse	Oreca 07	83	PA	(France) François Perrodo	All
(Italy) AF Corse	Oreca 07	83	PA	(France) Matthieu Vaxivière	All
(United States) AO by TF	Oreca 07	99	PA	(United States) Dane Cameron	All
(United States) AO by TF	Oreca 07	99	PA	(United States) P. J. Hyett	All
(United States) AO by TF	Oreca 07	99	PA	(Switzerland) Louis Delétraz	1, 3–6
(United States) AO by TF	Oreca 07	99	PA	(United Kingdom) Jonny Edgar	2

Icon	MISC
P2	LMP2
PA	LMP2 Pro-Am

- Alex Quinn had signed a contract extension with Algarve Pro Racing for 2026, but later switched to Nielsen Racing.
- Jacob Abel was scheduled to compete for Vector Sport, but was replaced prior to the start of the season.
- Tom Blomqvist was scheduled to compete for Inter Europol Competition, but was replaced prior to the start of the season.

=== LMP3 ===
All cars in the LMP3 class use the Toyota V35A-FTS 3.5 L twin-turbo V6 engine and Michelin tyres.

Entrant/Team	Chassis	No.	Drivers	Rounds
(Luxembourg) DKR Engineering	Ligier JS P325	4	(France) Romain Favre	All
(Luxembourg) DKR Engineering	Ligier JS P325	4	(Estonia) Antti Rammo	All
(Luxembourg) DKR Engineering	Ligier JS P325	4	(United States) Wyatt Brichacek	1–5
(Luxembourg) DKR Engineering	Ligier JS P325	4	(France) Gillian Henrion	6
(Germany) Rinaldi Racing	Ligier JS P325	5	(Portugal) José Cautela	All
(Germany) Rinaldi Racing	Ligier JS P325	5	(Denmark) Mikkel Gaarde Pedersen	All
(Germany) Rinaldi Racing	Ligier JS P325	5	(Italy) Alvise Rodella	All
(Poland) Team Virage	Ligier JS P325	8	(Spain) Daniel Nogales	All
(Poland) Team Virage	Ligier JS P325	8	(Italy) Matteo Quintarelli	All
(Poland) Team Virage	Ligier JS P325	8	(France) Louis Stern	All
(Italy) EuroInternational	Ligier JS P325	11	(United Kingdom) Matthew Richard Bell	All
(Italy) EuroInternational	Ligier JS P325	11	(Belgium) Douwe Dedecker	All
(Italy) EuroInternational	Ligier JS P325	11	(Netherlands) Max van der Snel	All
(Poland) Inter Europol Competition	Ligier JS P325	13	(United Arab Emirates) Alexander Bukhantsov	All
(Poland) Inter Europol Competition	Ligier JS P325	13	(Chinese Taipei) Chun-Ting Chou	All
(Poland) Inter Europol Competition	Ligier JS P325	13	(Colombia) Henry Cubides Olarte	All
(Switzerland) CLX Motorsport	Ligier JS P325	17	(France) Paul Lanchère	All
(Switzerland) CLX Motorsport	Ligier JS P325	17	(Brazil) Alexander Jacoby	All
(Switzerland) CLX Motorsport	Ligier JS P325	17	(Brazil) Bruno Ribeiro	1–2
(Switzerland) CLX Motorsport	Ligier JS P325	17	(France) Louis Iglesias	3–6
(France) Racing Spirit of Léman	Ligier JS P325	31	(Switzerland) Ralph Meichtry	All
(France) Racing Spirit of Léman	Ligier JS P325	31	(Germany) Lenny Ried	All
(France) Racing Spirit of Léman	Ligier JS P325	31	(Switzerland) Grégory de Sybourg	1–4
(France) Racing Spirit of Léman	Ligier JS P325	31	(Denmark) Oskar Kristensen	6
(France) Ultimate	Ligier JS P325	35	(Brazil) Lucas Fecury	All
(France) Ultimate	Ligier JS P325	35	(Denmark) Sebastian Gravlund	All
(France) Ultimate	Ligier JS P325	35	(United Kingdom) Terrence Woodward	All
(France) M Racing	Ligier JS P325	68	(United Kingdom) Nick Adcock	All
(France) M Racing	Ligier JS P325	68	(France) Thomas Imbourg	1–4
(France) M Racing	Ligier JS P325	68	(France) Quentin Antonel	1–2
(France) M Racing	Ligier JS P325	68	(United Kingdom) Alfie Briggs	4–6
(France) M Racing	Ligier JS P325	68	(France) Stéphane Tribaudini	5–6
(France) R-ace GP	Duqueine D09	85	(France) Fabien Michal	All
(France) R-ace GP	Duqueine D09	85	(Luxembourg) Pierre-Alexandre Provost	All
(France) R-ace GP	Duqueine D09	85	(Germany) Hugo Schwarze	All

- Isaac Tutumlu and Cindy Gudet were scheduled to compete for Rinaldi Racing and M Racing respectively, but were replaced prior to the start of the season.
- Matthieu Lahaye was scheduled to compete for the Ultimate team he co-owns, but stepped down prior to the start of the season.

=== LMGT3 ===
All cars in the LMGT3 class use Goodyear tyres.

Entrant/Team	Chassis	Engine	No.	Drivers	Rounds
(United Kingdom) United Autosports	McLaren 720S GT3 Evo	McLaren M840T 4.0 L Turbo V8	23	(United Kingdom) Michael Birch	All
(United Kingdom) United Autosports	McLaren 720S GT3 Evo	McLaren M840T 4.0 L Turbo V8	23	(United Kingdom) Wayne Boyd	All
(United Kingdom) United Autosports	McLaren 720S GT3 Evo	McLaren M840T 4.0 L Turbo V8	23	(Australia) Garnet Patterson	All
(United Kingdom) TF Sport	Chevrolet Corvette Z06 GT3.R	Chevrolet LT6.R 5.5 L V8	33	(Republic of Ireland) Charlie Eastwood	All
(United Kingdom) TF Sport	Chevrolet Corvette Z06 GT3.R	Chevrolet LT6.R 5.5 L V8	33	(United States) Blake McDonald	All
(United Kingdom) TF Sport	Chevrolet Corvette Z06 GT3.R	Chevrolet LT6.R 5.5 L V8	33	(United States) Alec Udell	All
(Italy) Richard Mille AF Corse	Ferrari 296 GT3 Evo	Ferrari F163CE 3.0 L Turbo V6	50	(Italy) Riccardo Agostini	All
(Italy) Richard Mille AF Corse	Ferrari 296 GT3 Evo	Ferrari F163CE 3.0 L Turbo V6	50	(Brazil) Custodio Toledo	All
(Italy) Richard Mille AF Corse	Ferrari 296 GT3 Evo	Ferrari F163CE 3.0 L Turbo V6	50	(Monaco) Francesco Castellacci	1
(Italy) Richard Mille AF Corse	Ferrari 296 GT3 Evo	Ferrari F163CE 3.0 L Turbo V6	50	(France) Lilou Wadoux	2–6
(Italy) AF Corse	Ferrari 296 GT3 Evo	Ferrari F163CE 3.0 L Turbo V6	51	(Denmark) Conrad Laursen	All
(Italy) AF Corse	Ferrari 296 GT3 Evo	Ferrari F163CE 3.0 L Turbo V6	51	(Italy) Davide Rigon	All
(Italy) AF Corse	Ferrari 296 GT3 Evo	Ferrari F163CE 3.0 L Turbo V6	51	(France) Charles-Henri Samani	All
(Switzerland) Spirit of Race	Ferrari 296 GT3 Evo	Ferrari F163CE 3.0 L Turbo V6	55	(United Kingdom) Duncan Cameron	All
(Switzerland) Spirit of Race	Ferrari 296 GT3 Evo	Ferrari F163CE 3.0 L Turbo V6	55	(Republic of Ireland) Matt Griffin	All
(Switzerland) Spirit of Race	Ferrari 296 GT3 Evo	Ferrari F163CE 3.0 L Turbo V6	55	(South Africa) David Perel	All
(Denmark) High Class Racing	Porsche 911 GT3 R (992.2)	Porsche M97/80 4.2 L Flat-6	54	(Denmark) Anders Fjordbach	1–4
(Denmark) High Class Racing	Porsche 911 GT3 R (992.2)	Porsche M97/80 4.2 L Flat-6	54	(Denmark) Dennis Andersen	1
(Denmark) High Class Racing	Porsche 911 GT3 R (992.2)	Porsche M97/80 4.2 L Flat-6	54	(Germany) Laurin Heinrich	1
(Denmark) High Class Racing	Porsche 911 GT3 R (992.2)	Porsche M97/80 4.2 L Flat-6	54	(Germany) Max Moritz	2–6
(Denmark) High Class Racing	Porsche 911 GT3 R (992.2)	Porsche M97/80 4.2 L Flat-6	54	(Austria) Thomas Preining	2
(Denmark) High Class Racing	Porsche 911 GT3 R (992.2)	Porsche M97/80 4.2 L Flat-6	54	(Austria) Klaus Bachler	3–6
(Denmark) High Class Racing	Porsche 911 GT3 R (992.2)	Porsche M97/80 4.2 L Flat-6	54	(Belgium) Benjamin Paque	5–6
(Switzerland) Kessel Racing	Ferrari 296 GT3 Evo	Ferrari F163CE 3.0 L Turbo V6	57	(France) Mathys Jaubert	All
(Switzerland) Kessel Racing	Ferrari 296 GT3 Evo	Ferrari F163CE 3.0 L Turbo V6	57	(Japan) Takeshi Kimura	All
(Switzerland) Kessel Racing	Ferrari 296 GT3 Evo	Ferrari F163CE 3.0 L Turbo V6	57	(Brazil) Daniel Serra	All
(Switzerland) Kessel Racing	Ferrari 296 GT3 Evo	Ferrari F163CE 3.0 L Turbo V6	74	(United Kingdom) Andrew Gilbert	All
(Switzerland) Kessel Racing	Ferrari 296 GT3 Evo	Ferrari F163CE 3.0 L Turbo V6	74	(France) Romain Leroux	All
(Switzerland) Kessel Racing	Ferrari 296 GT3 Evo	Ferrari F163CE 3.0 L Turbo V6	74	(Spain) Fran Rueda	All
(France) Racing Spirit of Léman	Aston Martin Vantage AMR GT3 Evo	Aston Martin M177 4.0 L Turbo V8	59	(France) Marius Fossard	All
(France) Racing Spirit of Léman	Aston Martin Vantage AMR GT3 Evo	Aston Martin M177 4.0 L Turbo V8	59	(France) Valentin Hasse-Clot	1–3, 5–6
(France) Racing Spirit of Léman	Aston Martin Vantage AMR GT3 Evo	Aston Martin M177 4.0 L Turbo V8	59	(France) Clément Mateu	1–3, 6
(France) Racing Spirit of Léman	Aston Martin Vantage AMR GT3 Evo	Aston Martin M177 4.0 L Turbo V8	59	(United States) Anthony McIntosh	4
(France) Racing Spirit of Léman	Aston Martin Vantage AMR GT3 Evo	Aston Martin M177 4.0 L Turbo V8	59	(Canada) Parker Thompson	4
(France) Racing Spirit of Léman	Aston Martin Vantage AMR GT3 Evo	Aston Martin M177 4.0 L Turbo V8	59	(France) François Hériau	5
Team Qatar by Iron Lynx	Mercedes-AMG GT3 Evo	Mercedes-AMG M159 6.2 L V8	62	(Qatar) Abdulla Al-Khelaifi	All
Team Qatar by Iron Lynx	Mercedes-AMG GT3 Evo	Mercedes-AMG M159 6.2 L V8	62	(Germany) Julian Hanses	All
Team Qatar by Iron Lynx	Mercedes-AMG GT3 Evo	Mercedes-AMG M159 6.2 L V8	62	(United Kingdom) Adam Christodoulou	1
Team Qatar by Iron Lynx	Mercedes-AMG GT3 Evo	Mercedes-AMG M159 6.2 L V8	62	(Belgium) Maxime Martin	2–4
Team Qatar by Iron Lynx	Mercedes-AMG GT3 Evo	Mercedes-AMG M159 6.2 L V8	62	(Estonia) Ralf Aron	5–6
(Italy) Iron Lynx	Mercedes-AMG GT3 Evo	Mercedes-AMG M159 6.2 L V8	63	(Angola) Rui Andrade	All
(Italy) Iron Lynx	Mercedes-AMG GT3 Evo	Mercedes-AMG M159 6.2 L V8	63	(Zimbabwe) Ameerh Naran	All
(Italy) Iron Lynx	Mercedes-AMG GT3 Evo	Mercedes-AMG M159 6.2 L V8	63	(Brazil) Sérgio Sette Câmara	All
(Germany) Proton Competition	Porsche 911 GT3 R (992.2)	Porsche M97/80 4.2 L Flat-6	75	(United States) Matt Kurzejewski	All
(Germany) Proton Competition	Porsche 911 GT3 R (992.2)	Porsche M97/80 4.2 L Flat-6	75	(Austria) Richard Lietz	All
(Germany) Proton Competition	Porsche 911 GT3 R (992.2)	Porsche M97/80 4.2 L Flat-6	75	(Australia) Tom Sargent	All
(Germany) Proton Competition	Porsche 911 GT3 R (992.2)	Porsche M97/80 4.2 L Flat-6	77	(Netherlands) Huub van Eijndhoven	All
(Germany) Proton Competition	Porsche 911 GT3 R (992.2)	Porsche M97/80 4.2 L Flat-6	77	(Japan) "Bankcy"	1–2
(Germany) Proton Competition	Porsche 911 GT3 R (992.2)	Porsche M97/80 4.2 L Flat-6	77	(United Kingdom) Harry King	1, 3, 5–6
(Germany) Proton Competition	Porsche 911 GT3 R (992.2)	Porsche M97/80 4.2 L Flat-6	77	(Germany) Joel Sturm	2
(Germany) Proton Competition	Porsche 911 GT3 R (992.2)	Porsche M97/80 4.2 L Flat-6	77	(Australia) Martin Berry	3–6
(Germany) Proton Competition	Porsche 911 GT3 R (992.2)	Porsche M97/80 4.2 L Flat-6	77	(Belgium) Alessio Picariello	4
(United Kingdom) GR Racing	Ferrari 296 GT3 Evo	Ferrari F163CE 3.0 L Turbo V6	86	(United Kingdom) Lorcan Hanafin	All
(United Kingdom) GR Racing	Ferrari 296 GT3 Evo	Ferrari F163CE 3.0 L Turbo V6	86	(Netherlands) Mex Jansen	All
(United Kingdom) GR Racing	Ferrari 296 GT3 Evo	Ferrari F163CE 3.0 L Turbo V6	86	(United Kingdom) Michael Wainwright	All

- Matt Bell and Auðunn Guðmundsson were scheduled to compete for TF Sport and High Class Racing respectively, but were replaced prior to the start of the season.

== Results and standings ==
=== Race results ===
Bold indicates overall winner.

Rnd.	Circuit	Pole	LMP2 Winning Team	LMP2 Pro-Am Winning Team	LMP3 Winning Team	LMGT3 Winning Team	Results
Rnd.	Circuit	Pole	LMP2 Winning Drivers	LMP2 Pro-Am Winning Drivers	LMP3 Winning Drivers	LMGT3 Winning Drivers	Results
1	(Spain) Catalunya	(Poland) No. 34 Inter Europol Competition	**(France) No. 29 Forestier Racing by Panis**	(Portugal) No. 20 Algarve Pro Racing	(Germany) No. 5 Rinaldi Racing	(Germany) No. 75 Proton Competition	Report
1	(Spain) Catalunya	**(France) Reshad de Gerus** (United States) Bijoy Garg	**(United Kingdom) Oliver Gray** **(France) Esteban Masson** **(France) Louis Rousset**	(Denmark) Malthe Jakobsen (Denmark) Michael Jensen (Italy) Enzo Trulli	(Portugal) José Cautela (Denmark) Mikkel Gaarde Pedersen (Italy) Alvise Rodella	(United States) Matt Kurzejewski (Austria) Richard Lietz (Australia) Tom Sargent	Report
2	(France) Le Castellet	(France) No. 29 Forestier Racing by Panis	**(United Kingdom) No. 22 United Autosports**	(United Kingdom) No. 27 Nielsen Racing	(Poland) No. 13 Inter Europol Competition	(Switzerland) No. 57 Kessel Racing	Report
2	(France) Le Castellet	(United Kingdom) Oliver Gray **(France) Esteban Masson** (France) Louis Rousset	**(United Kingdom) Ben Hanley** **(Australia) Griffin Peebles** **(Switzerland) Grégoire Saucy**	(Australia) James Allen (Greece) Kriton Lendoudis (United Kingdom) Alex Quinn	(United Arab Emirates) Alexander Bukhantsov (Chinese Taipei) Chun-Ting Chou (Colombia) Henry Cubides Olarte	(France) Mathys Jaubert (Japan) Takeshi Kimura (Brazil) Daniel Serra	Report
3	(Italy) Imola	(France) No. 29 Forestier Racing by Panis	**(France) No. 29 Forestier Racing by Panis**	(United Kingdom) No. 7 Vector Sport	(Switzerland) No. 17 CLX Motorsport	(United Kingdom) No. 33 TF Sport	Report
3	(Italy) Imola	(United Kingdom) Oliver Gray **(France) Esteban Masson** (France) Louis Rousset	**(United Kingdom) Oliver Gray** **(France) Esteban Masson** **(France) Louis Rousset**	(Turkey) Cem Bölükbaşı (Spain) Lorenzo Fluxá (Denmark) Jens Reno Møller	(France) Louis Iglesias (Brazil) Alexander Jacoby (France) Paul Lanchère	(Republic of Ireland) Charlie Eastwood (United States) Blake McDonald (United States) Alec Udell	Report
4	(Belgium) Spa-Francorchamps	(France) No. 18 IDEC Sport	**(Poland) No. 43 Inter Europol Competition**	(Italy) No. 83 AF Corse	(Switzerland) No. 17 CLX Motorsport (Note: The LMP3 class was originally won by the No. 5 Rinaldi Racing entry of José Cautela, Mikkel Gaarde Pedersen and Alvise Rodella, but they were subsequently disqualified for a fuel tank irregularity. As a result, the No. 17 CLX Motorsport car, initially classified second, inherited the win.)	(United Kingdom) No. 86 GR Racing	Report
4	(Belgium) Spa-Francorchamps	(United Kingdom) Jamie Chadwick (Germany) Laurents Hörr **(Italy) Valerio Rinicella**	**(France) Tom Dillmann** **(Poland) Jakub Śmiechowski** **(United Kingdom) Nick Yelloly**	(Italy) Antonio Fuoco (France) François Perrodo (France) Matthieu Vaxivière	(France) Louis Iglesias (Brazil) Alexander Jacoby (France) Paul Lanchère	(United Kingdom) Lorcan Hanafin (Netherlands) Mex Jansen (United Kingdom) Michael Wainwright	Report
5	(United Kingdom) Silverstone	(Poland) No. 43 Inter Europol Competition	**(Portugal) No. 25 Algarve Pro Racing**	(France) No. 14 TDS Racing	(France) No. 85 R-ace GP	No. 62 Team Qatar by Iron Lynx	Report
5	(United Kingdom) Silverstone	**(France) Tom Dillmann** (Poland) Jakub Śmiechowski (United Kingdom) Nick Yelloly	**(United Kingdom) Jake Hughes** **(Liechtenstein) Matthias Kaiser** **(United Kingdom) Ben Barnicoat**	(United States) Scott Huffaker (France) Sami Meguetounif (United States) Steven Thomas	(France) Fabien Michal (Luxembourg) Pierre-Alexandre Provost (Germany) Hugo Schwarze	(Qatar) Abdulla Al-Khelaifi (Germany) Julian Hanses (Estonia) Ralf Aron	Report
6	(Portugal) Algarve	(United Kingdom) No. 22 United Autosports	**(United Kingdom) No. 22 United Autosports**	(Portugal) No. 20 Algarve Pro Racing (Note: The LMP2 Pro-Am class was originally won by the No. 14 TDS Racing entry of Scott Huffaker, Sami Meguetounif and Steven Thomas, but they were subsequently issued with a penalty for exceeding track limits. As a result, the No. 20 Algarve Pro Racing car, initially classified second, inherited the win.)	(Switzerland) No. 17 CLX Motorsport	(Germany) No. 75 Proton Competition	Report
6	(Portugal) Algarve	(United Kingdom) Ben Hanley (Australia) Griffin Peebles **(Switzerland) Grégoire Saucy**	**(United Kingdom) Ben Hanley** **(Australia) Griffin Peebles** **(Switzerland) Grégoire Saucy**	(Denmark) Malthe Jakobsen (Denmark) Michael Jensen (Italy) Enzo Trulli	(France) Louis Iglesias (Brazil) Alexander Jacoby (France) Paul Lanchère	(United States) Matt Kurzejewski (Austria) Richard Lietz (Australia) Tom Sargent	Report

== Season report ==
=== Barcelona ===
Inter Europol's No. 34 took pole for the season opener at Barcelona, with Reshad de Gerus at the wheel. After a six-car pileup necessitated a red flag on the first lap, the No. 22 United Autosports entry of Griffin Peebles dominated the early running, the LMP2 rookie having driven out a 27-second lead before a spin into the gravel by Paul Lafargue neutralised the race. The latter stages featured a charge from the No. 29 Forestier Racing by Panis of Esteban Masson, who overcame multiple penalties caused by the car's silver-ranked driver Louis Rousset to pass the top three in the closing laps to win the race. The No. 34 finished second, while the No. 22 placed third — contact between it and the No. 24 Nielsen Racing of Jack Doohan had caused the Australian to drop out of the podium places with suspension failure.

In LMP2 Pro-Am, the No. 25 Algarve Pro Racing lineup led by Malthe Jakobsen claimed victory, Jakobsen having taken the lead from Doriane Pin at a full-course yellow restart; the No. 83 AF Corse finished second ahead of Pin's No. 30 Duqueine entry. Despite early domination from No. 85 R-ace GP's Fabien Michal, the No. 5 Rinaldi Racing crew won the LMP3 class, with the No. 13 Inter Europol finishing third behind the No. 85. In LMGT3, the No. 62 Team Qatar by Iron Lynx — dominant throughout the first half of the event — was caught and passed by the No. 75 Proton Competition Porsche of Tom Sargent with half an hour left, before dropping to fourth behind the No. 23 United Autosports McLaren and No. 57 Kessel Racing Ferrari.

=== Le Castellet ===
The fight for pole position at Le Castellet was won by Forestier's Esteban Masson, who narrowly beat the No. 22 United of Grégoire Saucy. The polesitting crew lost the lead to a charging Griffin Peebles at the start, who drove out a gap that was later consolidated by Saucy, who matched the chasing Oliver Gray. After the race restarted with 57 minutes to go, Masson slowed from second and was forced to retire, allowing Inter Europol's Reshad de Gerus to chase after United's Ben Hanley. The pair came to blows with 25 minutes to go and collided at the Mistral Chicane; Hanley retained the lead until the end, while de Gerus was forced to pass both IDEC Sport entries in the final stint. Neither driver was penalised for the incident. The No. 28 IDEC entry completed the podium ahead of the sister No. 18, which had started from the back after being disqualified from qualifying.

The LMP2 Pro-Am lead battle was decided by a penalty as Matthieu Vaxivière (AF Corse No. 83) received a drive-through for a yellow flag infringement, which handed victory to the No. 27 Nielsen Racing entry. The No. 99 AO by TF crew finished second, while the No. 30 Duqueine placed third — beating the No. 14 TDS Racing entry that had previously pulled out a commanding lead with Sami Meguetounif before the final caution. Victory in LMP3 went to the No. 13 of Inter Europol, as previous leaders R-ace GP had received multiple penalties that dropped them to sixth. The No. 68 M Racing car finished second ahead of a recovering No. 4 DKR Engineering car; it had led at the hands of Romain Favre before being forced to pit to close the car's left-hand door. A final-hour pass on the No. 33 TF Sport Corvette of Charlie Eastwood earned the No. 57 Kessel Ferrari of Mathys Jaubert the LMGT3 win, with Eastwood placing second and GR Racing completing the podium after two penalties were applied ahead.

=== Imola ===
Masson took pole again at Imola. Having lost the lead in the first stint, the No. 29 battled back with Gray at the wheel to close on the leading No. 22 of Saucy. The former then performed an undercut, which allowed Masson to shuffle out ahead of Hanley ahead of the final hour. Masson grew his gap to Hanley, who held the third-placed No. 25 Algarve Pro entry of Jake Hughes at arm's length in the closing laps, to almost a minute until the finish. The victory proved emotional for the team, as Marc van der Straten, who had backed the Panis effort during its title-winning 2025 campaign, passed away on the same day.

In the LMP2 Pro-Am class, the No. 7 Vector Sport claimed the team's first ever LMP2 win ahead of the No. 20 Algarve Pro entry, with the No. 21 United crew taking third. Thanks to a standout drive by ELMS rookie Louis Iglesias, a substitute from this race onward, the No. 17 CLX Motorsport crew took a commanding triumph in the LMP3 class, beating Rinaldi Racing and Team Virage. The No. 33 Corvette won in LMGT3, as Charlie Eastwood charged past three competitors by using fresh tyres in the final stint. The No. 62 Qatar by Iron Lynx Mercedes beat the No. 77 Proton Porsche to third.

=== Spa-Francorchamps ===
At Spa-Francorchamps, the rookie Valerio Rinicella clinched pole position for the No. 18 IDEC Sport entry. Despite another dominant first stint from United Autosports' Peebles (who had overcome contact from No. 34's Bijoy Garg at the start), the caution-filled race later swung in favour of the No. 43 Inter Europol entry. Led by Nick Yelloly in the third and Tom Dillmann in the fourth hour, the car emerged ahead of the No. 10 Vector Sport team of Pietro Fittipaldi after the final pit stop and maintained the lead until the checkered flag. The No. 10 was penalised post-race for a drive time infringement, allowing the No. 29 Forestier Racing crew to finish second and take the championship lead from United Autosports on countback; the No. 22 had dropped three positions in the third hour when Saucy went off track at the Bus Stop chicane to avoid the spinning No. 88 Proton Competition car. Polesitters IDEC Sport were promoted to third.

Drama filled the closing minutes of the LMP2 Pro-Am class, as the leading No. 83 AF Corse of Vaxivière was being caught by Louis Delétraz in the No. 99 AO by TF entry, who had passed Algarve Pro's Jakobsen for second early in the final stint. With two minutes to go, Delétraz attempted an overtake at Les Combes but spun after a late defensive move from Vaxivière. The AF Corse team went unpenalised, winning ahead of Jakobsen and the recovering Delétraz. In LMP3, it initially looked like a dominant win for the No. 5 Rinaldi crew. However, a post-race disqualification for a fuel tank violation promoted the No. 17 CLX Ligier to first, with R-ace GP and the No. 11 EuroInternational completing the rostrum. The LMGT3 fight turned into a battle on fuel strategy at the end, with GR Racing coming out on top after Lorcan Hanafin held off Proton's Alessio Picariello in the final laps. The No. 62 Qatar by Iron Lynx Mercedes, which had taken the lead during Al-Khelaifi's stints, finished third.

=== Silverstone ===
Off the back of their first win of the season, the No. 43 Inter Europol crew took pole at Silverstone thanks to a lap from Tom Dillmann. The race, held in mixed-weather conditions, proved chaotic. The first hour was dominated by No. 37 CLX's Theodor Jensen, meanwhile Peebles in the title-contending No. 22 United earned a drive-through penalty for colliding with an LMP3 car. As the rain hit during the second hour, the other title contender — Forestier Racing's Oliver Gray — went off at Brooklands and lost two laps while being recovered from the gravel. At the same time, the polesitting No. 43 lost its rear right wheel and a collision between the No. 63 Iron Lynx Mercedes of Ameerh Naran and the No. 74 Kessel Ferrari of Andrew Gilbert resulted in a lengthy safety car period. After the restart, the No. 24 Nielsen entry of Ed Pearson held the lead until being caught and passed for overall honours by the charging No. 14 TDS of Sami Meguetounif. Meguetounif later stopped the car to perform an electrical reset during a full-course yellow period, losing him first overall. In the final hour, No. 25 Algarve Pro's substitute driver, Ben Barnicoat, went from sixth to first and took a dominant win for the 2023 champions, while Scott Huffaker in the No. 14 climbed back to second overall and first in LMP2 Pro-Am. The No. 21 United Autosports Pro-Am entry finished third overall, while the No. 22 United placed third of the Pro cars — giving them a 13-point lead over the No. 29 Forestier car. Second in Pro was the No. 28 IDEC Sport, which finished fourth ahead of the third-in-class No. 19 Virage Pro-Am car.

The LMP3 battle was decided during the third hour, as CLX's leading Alexander Jacoby spun while being chased by R-ace GP's Pierre-Alexandre Provost, who went on to win ahead of a chasing Louis Iglesias. Third went to the No. 13 Inter Europol crew, as the No. 5 Rinaldi of Mikkel Gaarde Pedersen stopped on track in the closing minutes and dropped to fifth. In LMGT3, a battle between the No. 62 Qatar by Iron Lynx Mercedes and No. 33 Corvette broke out: the latter had led the early running with bronze-ranked Blake McDonald at the wheel, before Team Qatar's Ralf Aron passed Corvette's Alec Udell for the lead with 90 minutes to go. Despite pressure from Corvette factory driver Eastwood, Julian Hanses held on to win for the No. 62 in the final laps, while a rapid Harry King secured third for Proton Competition's No. 77 after passing Mathys Jaubert's No. 57 Kessel on the final lap.

=== Portimão ===
For the final race in Portimão, Grégoire Saucy put the championship-leading No. 22 on pole with a three-tenth margin over Forestier's Esteban Masson, who had previously topped both practice sessions. The United crew of Saucy, Peebles, and Hanley dominated the race, leading every lap on their way to the title, United's first since 2020. Masson dropped to fourth during the final stint, losing out on the podium to the No. 18 IDEC Sport and No. 43 Inter Europol entries, but secured second in the LMP2 standings — resulting in an automatic invitation to the 2027 24 Hours of Le Mans.

After a standout run from Meguetounif, the No. 14 TDS crew looked to have sown up the LMP2 Pro-Am win and a corresponding title triumph. However, pressured in the closing laps by the chasing No. 20 Algarve Pro of Jakobsen, TDS's Huffaker received a drive-through penalty for repeated track limits violations, dropping the TDS to third and promoting Algarve Pro to first and the Pro-Am championship. The No. 47 CLX car of Charles Milesi, whom Jakobsen had passed at the start of their final stint, finished second, while previous championship leaders AF Corse dropped down the order with an engine issue in the third hour. In LMP3, the CLX crew defended its 2025 title, with Paul Lanchère going back-to-back and Iglesias — who ended up second in the drivers' championship, having missed the first two races — dominated the final hour to cap off the season win a win, ahead of Rinaldi's No. 5 and DKR's No. 4. They had become the clear title favourites early on, as their only other competitor, the No. 85 R-ace GP crew, had gotten trapped a lap down after attempting to perform its two mandatory long pit stops during an early virtual safety car. The LMGT3 class, won by the No. 75 Proton, saw championship leaders Team Qatar drop down the order after Hanses received a stop-go penalty for pit lane speeding, leaving the No. 33 Corvette of Eastwood with a narrow lead going into the final hour. He hung on to second in the race against the chasing Benjamin Paque and Mathys Jaubert, winning the title by two points to the No. 75. The No. 54 High Class Racing Porsche of Paque inherited third after Jaubert's Ferrari was penalised for pitting under a full-course yellow.

At the end-of-season awards ceremony, Griffin Peebles won the Performance of the Year award as well as the Golden Goodyear Wingfoot Award, the latter for "scoring the best speed and consistency across his stints". Malthe Jakobsen won the latter award in the LMP2 Pro-Am class, while Charlie Eastwood took the award's LMGT3 iteration. Louis Iglesias won Rookie of the Year honours, while departing race director Eduardo Freitas was presented with a Career Achievement Award.

== Drivers' Championships ==
Points are awarded according to the following structure:

Position	**1st**	**2nd**	**3rd**	**4th**	**5th**	**6th**	**7th**	**8th**	**9th**	**10th**	**Pole**
Points	25	18	15	12	10	8	6	4	2	1	1

=== LMP2 Drivers' Championship ===
Pos.	Driver	Team	BAR (Spain)	LEC (France)	IMO (Italy)	SPA (Belgium)	SIL (United Kingdom)	POR (Portugal)	Points
1	(United Kingdom) Ben Hanley	(United Kingdom) United Autosports	3	1	2	4	3	1	110
1	(Australia) Griffin Peebles	(United Kingdom) United Autosports	3	1	2	4	3	1	110
1	(Switzerland) Grégoire Saucy	(United Kingdom) United Autosports	3	1	2	4	3	1	110
2	(United Kingdom) Oliver Gray	(France) Forestier Racing by Panis	1	**Ret**	**1**	2	9	4	84
2	(France) Esteban Masson	(France) Forestier Racing by Panis	1	**Ret**	**1**	2	9	4	84
2	(France) Louis Rousset	(France) Forestier Racing by Panis	1	**Ret**	**1**	2	9	4	84
3	(United Kingdom) Jamie Chadwick	(France) IDEC Sport	4	4	4	**3**	11	2	70
3	(Germany) Laurents Hörr	(France) IDEC Sport	4	4	4	**3**	11	2	70
3	(Italy) Valerio Rinicella	(France) IDEC Sport	4	4	4	**3**	11	2	70
4	(United Kingdom) Jake Hughes	(Portugal) Algarve Pro Racing	9	9	3	5	1	6	62
4	(Liechtenstein) Matthias Kaiser	(Portugal) Algarve Pro Racing	9	9	3	5	1	6	62
5	(France) Tom Dillmann	(Poland) Inter Europol Competition	5	7	10	1	**10**	3	59
5	(Poland) Jakub Śmiechowski	(Poland) Inter Europol Competition	5	7	10	1	**10**	3	59
6	(France) Reshad de Gerus	(Poland) Inter Europol Competition	**2**	2	7	11	6	8	55
6	(United States) Bijoy Garg	(Poland) Inter Europol Competition	**2**	2	7	11	6	8	55
7	(United Kingdom) Nick Yelloly	(Poland) Inter Europol Competition	5		10	1	**10**	3	53
8	(Republic of Ireland) Ryan Cullen	(United Kingdom) Vector Sport	6	5	6	9	7	5	44
8	(Brazil) Pietro Fittipaldi	(United Kingdom) Vector Sport	6	5	6	9	7	5	44
8	(France) Vladislav Lomko	(United Kingdom) Vector Sport	6	5	6	9	7	5	44
9	(Mexico) Ian Aguilera	(Switzerland) CLX Motorsport	8	6	9	7	5	7	36
9	(France) Adrien Closmenil	(Switzerland) CLX Motorsport	8	6	9	7	5	7	36
9	(Denmark) Theodor Jensen	(Switzerland) CLX Motorsport	8	6	9	7	5	7	36
10	(France) Paul-Loup Chatin	(France) IDEC Sport	10	3	11	10	2	Ret	35
10	(France) Paul Lafargue	(France) IDEC Sport	10	3	11	10	2	Ret	35
10	(Netherlands) Job van Uitert	(France) IDEC Sport	10	3	11	10	2	Ret	35
11	(Israel) Roy Nissany	(United Kingdom) Nielsen Racing	7	10	5	8	4	9	35
11	(United Kingdom) Edward Pearson	(United Kingdom) Nielsen Racing	7	10	5	8	4	9	35
12	(France) Tristan Vautier	(Portugal) Algarve Pro Racing	9	9	3	5			29
13	(United Kingdom) Ben Barnicoat	(Portugal) Algarve Pro Racing					1		25
14	(Australia) Jack Doohan	(United Kingdom) Nielsen Racing	7	10	5	8			21
15	(United Kingdom) Sebastian Priaulx	(Germany) Proton Competition	Ret	8	8	6	8	10	21
15	(Germany) Jonas Ried	(Germany) Proton Competition	Ret	8	8	6	8	10	21
15	(Germany) Mike Rockenfeller	(Germany) Proton Competition	Ret	8	8	6	8	10	21
16	(United Kingdom) Jack Aitken	(United Kingdom) Nielsen Racing					4		12
17	(United Kingdom) Alex Lynn	(Portugal) Algarve Pro Racing						6	8
18	(Italy) Luca Ghiotto	(Poland) Inter Europol Competition		7					6
19	(Brazil) Pipo Derani	(United Kingdom) Nielsen Racing						9	2
Pos.	Driver	Team	BAR (Spain)	LEC (France)	IMO (Italy)	SPA (Belgium)	SIL (United Kingdom)	POR (Portugal)	Points

Key
Colour	Result
Gold	Race winner
Silver	2nd place
Bronze	3rd place
Green	Points finish
Blue	Non-points finish
Blue	Non-classified finish (NC)
Purple	Did not finish (Ret)
Black	Disqualified (DSQ)
Black	Excluded (EX)
White	Did not start (DNS)
White	Race cancelled (C)
White	Withdrew (WD)
Blank	Did not participate

**Bold** - Pole

Italics - Fastest lap

=== LMP2 Pro-Am Drivers' Championship ===
Pos.	Driver	Team	BAR (Spain)	LEC (France)	IMO (Italy)	SPA (Belgium)	SIL (United Kingdom)	POR (Portugal)	Points
1	(Denmark) Malthe Jakobsen	(Portugal) Algarve Pro Racing	1	11	2	2	11	1	86
1	(Denmark) Michael Jensen	(Portugal) Algarve Pro Racing	1	11	2	2	11	1	86
1	(Italy) Enzo Trulli	(Portugal) Algarve Pro Racing	1	11	2	2	11	1	86
2	(United States) Scott Huffaker	(France) TDS Racing	4	4	Ret	4	**1**	3	77
2	(France) Sami Meguetounif	(France) TDS Racing	4	4	Ret	4	**1**	3	77
2	(United States) Steven Thomas	(France) TDS Racing	4	4	Ret	4	**1**	3	77
3	(Italy) Antonio Fuoco	(Italy) AF Corse	2	6	5	1	7	11	67
3	(France) François Perrodo	(Italy) AF Corse	2	6	5	1	7	11	67
3	(France) Matthieu Vaxivière	(Italy) AF Corse	2	6	5	1	7	11	67
4	(France) Doriane Pin	(France) Duqueine Team	**3**	3	**7**	**5**	4	7	67
4	(Italy) Giorgio Roda	(France) Duqueine Team	**3**	3	**7**	**5**	4	7	67
4	(Netherlands) Richard Verschoor	(France) Duqueine Team	**3**	3	**7**	**5**	4	7	67
5	(Turkey) Cem Bölükbaşı	(United Kingdom) Vector Sport	6	5	1	7	8	4	65
5	(Spain) Lorenzo Fluxá	(United Kingdom) Vector Sport	6	5	1	7	8	4	65
5	(Denmark) Jens Reno Møller	(United Kingdom) Vector Sport	6	5	1	7	8	4	65
6	(Portugal) Manuel Espírito Santo	(United Arab Emirates) Rossa Racing by Virage	5	7	4	6	3	6	59
6	(United States) John Falb	(United Arab Emirates) Rossa Racing by Virage	5	7	4	6	3	6	59
6	(Netherlands) Rik Koen	(United Arab Emirates) Rossa Racing by Virage	5	7	4	6	3	6	59
7	(United Kingdom) Oliver Jarvis	(United Kingdom) United Autosports	7	8	3	10	2	9	46
7	(Japan) Marino Sato	(United Kingdom) United Autosports	7	8	3	10	2	9	46
7	(Brazil) Daniel Schneider	(United Kingdom) United Autosports	7	8	3	10	2	9	46
8	(United States) Dane Cameron	(United States) AO by TF	10	**2**	9	3	6	Ret	45
8	(United States) P. J. Hyett	(United States) AO by TF	10	**2**	9	3	6	Ret	45
9	(Greece) Georgios Kolovos	(Switzerland) CLX Motorsport	Ret	9	6	11	5	2	38
9	(France) Charles Milesi	(Switzerland) CLX Motorsport	Ret	9	6	11	5	2	38
9	(Austria) Ferdinand Habsburg	(Switzerland) CLX Motorsport		9	6	11	5	2	38
10	(Australia) James Allen	(United Kingdom) Nielsen Racing	Ret	1	11	8	10	8	34
10	(Greece) Kriton Lendoudis	(United Kingdom) Nielsen Racing	Ret	1	11	8	10	8	34
10	(United Kingdom) Alex Quinn	(United Kingdom) Nielsen Racing	Ret	1	11	8	10	8	34
11	(Switzerland) Louis Delétraz	(United States) AO by TF	10		9	3	6	Ret	26
12	(Belgium) Jean Glorieux	(Luxembourg) DKR Engineering	8	10	8	12	9	**5**	22
12	(France) Marlon Hernandez	(Luxembourg) DKR Engineering	8	10	8	12	9	**5**	22
13	(United Kingdom) Jonny Edgar	(United States) AO by TF		**2**					19
14	(France) Tristan Vautier	(Luxembourg) DKR Engineering						**5**	11
15	(France) Macéo Capietto	(Luxembourg) DKR Engineering			8		9		6
16	(Austria) René Binder	(Germany) Proton Competition	9	12	10	9	12	10	6
16	(Austria) Horst Felbermayr Jr.	(Germany) Proton Competition	9	12	10	9	12	10	6
16	(Austria) Horst Felix Felbermayr	(Germany) Proton Competition	9	12	10	9	12	10	6
17	(Mexico) Sebastián Álvarez	(Luxembourg) DKR Engineering	8	10					5
18	(France) Julien Andlauer	(Luxembourg) DKR Engineering				12			0
19	(Brazil) Felipe Fraga	(Switzerland) CLX Motorsport	Ret						0
Pos.	Driver	Team	BAR (Spain)	LEC (France)	IMO (Italy)	SPA (Belgium)	SIL (United Kingdom)	POR (Portugal)	Points

=== LMP3 Drivers' Championship ===
Pos.	Driver	Team	BAR (Spain)	LEC (France)	IMO (Italy)	SPA (Belgium)	SIL (United Kingdom)	POR (Portugal)	Points
1	(France) Paul Lanchère	(Switzerland) CLX Motorsport	8	5	**1**	1	**2**	**1**	110
1	(Brazil) Alexander Jacoby	(Switzerland) CLX Motorsport	8	5	**1**	1	**2**	**1**	110
2	(France) Louis Iglesias	(Switzerland) CLX Motorsport			**1**	1	**2**	**1**	96
3	(Portugal) José Cautela	(Germany) Rinaldi Racing	1	7	2	DSQ	5	2	77
3	(Denmark) Mikkel Gaarde Pedersen	(Germany) Rinaldi Racing	1	7	2	DSQ	5	2	77
3	(Italy) Alvise Rodella	(Germany) Rinaldi Racing	1	7	2	DSQ	5	2	77
4	(France) Fabien Michal	(France) R-ace GP	**2**	6	8	**2**	1	10	76
4	(Luxembourg) Pierre-Alexandre Provost	(France) R-ace GP	**2**	6	8	**2**	1	10	76
4	(Germany) Hugo Schwarze	(France) R-ace GP	**2**	6	8	**2**	1	10	76
5	(United Kingdom) Matthew Richard Bell	(Italy) EuroInternational	4	DSQ	4	3	4	4	63
5	(Belgium) Douwe Dedecker	(Italy) EuroInternational	4	DSQ	4	3	4	4	63
5	(Netherlands) Max van der Snel	(Italy) EuroInternational	4	DSQ	4	3	4	4	63
6	(United Arab Emirates) Alexander Bukhantsov	(Poland) Inter Europol Competition	3	1	10	Ret	3	9	58
6	(Chinese Taipei) Chun-Ting Chou	(Poland) Inter Europol Competition	3	1	10	Ret	3	9	58
7	(Colombia) Henry Cubides Olarte	(Poland) Inter Europol Competition	3	1	10	Ret	3	9	57
8	(France) Romain Favre	(Luxembourg) DKR Engineering	9	**3**	5	6	7	3	57
8	(Estonia) Antti Rammo	(Luxembourg) DKR Engineering	9	**3**	5	6	7	3	57
9	(Spain) Daniel Nogales	(Poland) Team Virage	5	8	3	5	10	7	46
9	(Italy) Matteo Quintarelli	(Poland) Team Virage	5	8	3	5	10	7	46
9	(France) Louis Stern	(Poland) Team Virage	5	8	3	5	10	7	46
10	(United States) Wyatt Brichacek	(Luxembourg) DKR Engineering	9	**3**	5	6	7		42
11	(Brazil) Lucas Fecury	(France) Ultimate	6	4	7	8	6	8	42
11	(Denmark) Sebastian Gravlund	(France) Ultimate	6	4	7	8	6	8	42
11	(United Kingdom) Terence Woodward	(France) Ultimate	6	4	7	8	6	8	42
12	(Switzerland) Ralph Meichtry	(France) Racing Spirit of Léman	7	9	6	4	8	6	40
13	(United Kingdom) Nick Adcock	(France) M Racing	Ret	2	9	7	9	5	38
14	(Germany) Lenny Ried	(France) Racing Spirit of Léman	7	9	6	4	8	6	38
15	(Switzerland) Grégory de Sybourg	(France) Racing Spirit of Léman	7	9	6	4			28
16	(France) Thomas Imbourg	(France) M Racing	Ret	2	9	7			20
17	(France) Quentin Antonel	(France) M Racing	Ret	2					18
18	(United Kingdom) Alfie Briggs	(France) M Racing				7	9	5	18
19	(France) Gillian Henrion	(Luxembourg) DKR Engineering						3	15
20	(Brazil) Bruno Ribeiro	(Switzerland) CLX Motorsport	8	5					14
21	(France) Stéphane Tribaudini	(France) M Racing					9	5	12
22	(Denmark) Oskar Kristensen	(France) Racing Spirit of Léman						6	8
Pos.	Driver	Team	BAR (Spain)	LEC (France)	IMO (Italy)	SPA (Belgium)	SIL (United Kingdom)	POR (Portugal)	Points

=== LMGT3 Drivers' Championship ===
Pos.	Driver	Team	BAR (Spain)	LEC (France)	IMO (Italy)	SPA (Belgium)	SIL (United Kingdom)	POR (Portugal)	Points
1	(Republic of Ireland) Charlie Eastwood	(United Kingdom) TF Sport	Ret	2	**1**	6	2	2	88
1	(United States) Blake McDonald	(United Kingdom) TF Sport	Ret	2	**1**	6	2	2	88
1	(United States) Alec Udell	(United Kingdom) TF Sport	Ret	2	**1**	6	2	2	88
2	(United States) Matt Kurzejewski	(Germany) Proton Competition	1	7	4	5	6	1	86
2	(Austria) Richard Lietz	(Germany) Proton Competition	1	7	4	5	6	1	86
2	(Australia) Tom Sargent	(Germany) Proton Competition	1	7	4	5	6	1	86
3	(Qatar) Abdulla Al-Khelaifi	Team Qatar by Iron Lynx	**4**	**Ret**	2	3	**1**	**8**	78
3	(Germany) Julian Hanses	Team Qatar by Iron Lynx	**4**	**Ret**	2	3	**1**	**8**	78
4	(Netherlands) Huub van Eijndhoven	(Germany) Proton Competition	8	5	3	2	3	5	72
5	(Australia) Martin Berry	(Germany) Proton Competition			3	2	3	5	58
6	(France) Mathys Jaubert	(Switzerland) Kessel Racing	3	1	11	Ret	4	13	52
6	(Japan) Takeshi Kimura	(Switzerland) Kessel Racing	3	1	11	Ret	4	13	52
6	(Brazil) Daniel Serra	(Switzerland) Kessel Racing	3	1	11	Ret	4	13	52
7	(United Kingdom) Lorcan Hanafin	(United Kingdom) GR Racing	Ret	3	7	1	8	9	52
7	(Netherlands) Mex Jansen	(United Kingdom) GR Racing	Ret	3	7	1	8	9	52
7	(United Kingdom) Michael Wainwright	(United Kingdom) GR Racing	Ret	3	7	1	8	9	52
8	(United Kingdom) Harry King	(Germany) Proton Competition	8		3		3	5	44
9	(United Kingdom) Duncan Cameron	(Switzerland) Spirit of Race	6	4	9	7	5	12	38
9	(Republic of Ireland) Matt Griffin	(Switzerland) Spirit of Race	6	4	9	7	5	12	38
9	(South Africa) David Perel	(Switzerland) Spirit of Race	6	4	9	7	5	12	38
10	(Germany) Max Moritz	(Denmark) High Class Racing		8	5	9	7	3	37
11	(Belgium) Maxime Martin	Team Qatar by Iron Lynx		**Ret**	2	3			34
12	(Estonia) Ralf Aron	Team Qatar by Iron Lynx					**1**	**8**	31
13	(Austria) Klaus Bachler	(Denmark) High Class Racing			5	9	7	3	31
14	(Denmark) Conrad Laursen	(Italy) AF Corse	9	DSQ	6	4	Ret	6	30
14	(France) Charles-Henri Samani	(Italy) AF Corse	9	DSQ	6	4	Ret	6	30
15	(United Kingdom) Michael Birch	(United Kingdom) United Autosports	2	Ret	Ret	10	9	10	22
15	(Australia) Garnet Patterson	(United Kingdom) United Autosports	2	Ret	Ret	10	9	10	22
16	(Italy) Davide Rigon	(Italy) AF Corse	9	DSQ	6	4	Ret	6	22
17	(Belgium) Benjamin Paque	(Denmark) High Class Racing					7	3	21
18	(Italy) Riccardo Agostini	(Italy) Richard Mille AF Corse	5	Ret	8	Ret	WD	7	20
18	(Brazil) Custodio Toledo	(Italy) Richard Mille AF Corse	5	Ret	8	Ret	WD	7	20
19	(Belgium) Alessio Picariello	(Germany) Proton Competition				2			18
20	(Angola) Rui Andrade	(Italy) Iron Lynx	7	6	Ret	8	Ret	Ret	18
20	(Zimbabwe) Ameerh Naran	(Italy) Iron Lynx	7	6	Ret	8	Ret	Ret	18
20	(Brazil) Sérgio Sette Câmara	(Italy) Iron Lynx	7	6	Ret	8	Ret	Ret	18
21	(France) Marius Fossard	(France) Racing Spirit of Léman	10	9	Ret	**12**	10	4	17
22	(Denmark) Anders Fjordbach	(Denmark) High Class Racing	11	8	5	9			16
23	(France) Clément Mateu	(France) Racing Spirit of Léman	10	9	Ret			4	15
24	(France) Valentin Hasse-Clot	(France) Racing Spirit of Léman	10	9	Ret		10	4	14
25	(Japan) "Bankcy"	(Germany) Proton Competition	8	5					14
26	(United Kingdom) Adam Christodoulou	Team Qatar by Iron Lynx	**4**						13
27	(Monaco) Francesco Castellacci	(Italy) Richard Mille AF Corse	5						10
28	(Germany) Joel Sturm	(Germany) Proton Competition		5					10
29	(France) Lilou Wadoux	(Italy) Richard Mille AF Corse		Ret	8	Ret	WD	7	10
30	(Austria) Thomas Preining	(Denmark) High Class Racing		8					4
31	(United Kingdom) Wayne Boyd	(United Kingdom) United Autosports	2	Ret	Ret	10	9	10	4
32	(United Kingdom) Andrew Gilbert	(Switzerland) Kessel Racing	12	Ret	10	11	Ret	11	1
32	(France) Romain Leroux	(Switzerland) Kessel Racing	12	Ret	10	11	Ret	11	1
32	(Spain) Fran Rueda	(Switzerland) Kessel Racing	12	Ret	10	11	Ret	11	1
33	(France) François Hériau	(France) Racing Spirit of Léman					10		1
34	(United States) Anthony McIntosh	(France) Racing Spirit of Léman				**12**			1
34	(Canada) Parker Thompson	(France) Racing Spirit of Léman				**12**			1
35	(Denmark) Dennis Andersen	(Denmark) High Class Racing	11						0
35	(Germany) Laurin Heinrich	(Denmark) High Class Racing	11						0
Pos.	Driver	Team	BAR (Spain)	LEC (France)	IMO (Italy)	SPA (Belgium)	SIL (United Kingdom)	POR (Portugal)	Points

== Teams' Championships ==
Points are awarded according to the following structure:

Position	**1st**	**2nd**	**3rd**	**4th**	**5th**	**6th**	**7th**	**8th**	**9th**	**10th**	**Pole**
Points	25	18	15	12	10	8	6	4	2	1	1

=== LMP2 Teams' Championship ===
Pos.	Team	Car	BAR (Spain)	LEC (France)	IMO (Italy)	SPA (Belgium)	SIL (United Kingdom)	POR (Portugal)	Points
1	(United Kingdom) #22 United Autosports	Oreca 07	3	1	2	4	3	**1**	111
2	(France) #29 Forestier Racing by Panis	Oreca 07	1	**Ret**	**1**	2	9	4	84
3	(France) #18 IDEC Sport	Oreca 07	4	4	4	**3**	11	2	70
4	(Portugal) #25 Algarve Pro Racing	Oreca 07	9	9	3	5	1	6	62
5	(Poland) #43 Inter Europol Competition	Oreca 07	5	7	10	1	**10**	3	59
6	(Poland) #34 Inter Europol Competition	Oreca 07	**2**	2	7	11	6	8	55
7	(United Kingdom) #10 Vector Sport	Oreca 07	6	5	6	9	7	5	44
8	(Switzerland) #37 CLX Motorsport	Oreca 07	8	6	9	7	5	7	36
9	(France) #28 IDEC Sport	Oreca 07	10	3	11	10	2	Ret	35
10	(United Kingdom) #24 Nielsen Racing	Oreca 07	7	10	5	8	4	9	35
11	(Germany) #9 Proton Competition	Oreca 07	Ret	8	8	6	8	10	21

Key
Colour	Result
Gold	Race winner
Silver	2nd place
Bronze	3rd place
Green	Points finish
Blue	Non-points finish
Blue	Non-classified finish (NC)
Purple	Did not finish (Ret)
Black	Disqualified (DSQ)
Black	Excluded (EX)
White	Did not start (DNS)
White	Race cancelled (C)
White	Withdrew (WD)
Blank	Did not participate

**Bold** - Pole

Italics - Fastest lap

=== LMP2 Pro-Am Teams' Championship ===
Pos.	Team	Car	BAR (Spain)	LEC (France)	IMO (Italy)	SPA (Belgium)	SIL (United Kingdom)	POR (Portugal)	Points
1	(Portugal) #20 Algarve Pro Racing	Oreca 07	1	11	2	2	11	1	86
2	(France) #14 TDS Racing	Oreca 07	4	4	Ret	4	**1**	3	77
3	(Italy) #83 AF Corse	Oreca 07	2	6	5	1	7	11	67
4	(France) #30 Duqueine Team	Oreca 07	**3**	3	**7**	**5**	4	7	67
5	(United Kingdom) #7 Vector Sport	Oreca 07	6	5	1	7	8	4	65
6	(United Arab Emirates) #19 Rossa Racing by Virage	Oreca 07	5	7	4	6	3	6	59
7	(United Kingdom) #21 United Autosports	Oreca 07	7	8	3	10	2	9	46
8	(United States) #99 AO by TF	Oreca 07	10	**2**	9	3	6	Ret	45
9	(Switzerland) #47 CLX Motorsport	Oreca 07	Ret	9	6	11	5	2	38
10	(United Kingdom) #27 Nielsen Racing	Oreca 07	Ret	1	11	8	10	8	34
11	(Luxembourg) #3 DKR Engineering	Oreca 07	8	10	8	12	9	5	21
12	(Germany) #88 Proton Competition	Oreca 07	9	12	10	9	12	10	6

=== LMP3 Teams' Championship ===
Pos.	Team	Car	BAR (Spain)	LEC (France)	IMO (Italy)	SPA (Belgium)	SIL (United Kingdom)	POR (Portugal)	Points
1	(Switzerland) #17 CLX Motorsport	Ligier JS P325	8	5	**1**	1	**2**	**1**	110
2	(Germany) #5 Rinaldi Racing	Ligier JS P325	1	7	2	DSQ	5	2	77
3	(France) #85 R-ace GP	Duqueine D09	**2**	6	8	**2**	1	10	76
4	(Italy) #11 EuroInternational	Ligier JS P325	4	DSQ	4	3	4	4	63
5	(Poland) #13 Inter Europol Competition	Ligier JS P325	3	1	10	Ret	3	9	58
6	(Luxembourg) #4 DKR Engineering	Ligier JS P325	9	**3**	5	6	7	3	57
7	(Poland) #8 Team Virage	Ligier JS P325	5	8	3	5	10	7	46
8	(France) #35 Ultimate	Ligier JS P325	6	4	7	8	6	8	42
9	(France) #31 Racing Spirit of Léman	Ligier JS P325	7	9	6	4	8	6	40
10	(France) #68 M Racing	Ligier JS P325	Ret	2	9	7	9	5	38

=== LMGT3 Teams' Championship ===
Pos.	Team	Car	BAR (Spain)	LEC (France)	IMO (Italy)	SPA (Belgium)	SIL (United Kingdom)	POR (Portugal)	Points
1	(United Kingdom) #33 TF Sport	Chevrolet Corvette Z06 GT3.R	Ret	2	**1**	6	2	2	88
2	(Germany) #75 Proton Competition	Porsche 911 GT3 R (992.2)	1	7	4	5	6	1	86
3	#62 Team Qatar by Iron Lynx	Mercedes-AMG GT3 Evo	**4**	**Ret**	2	3	**1**	**8**	78
4	(Germany) #77 Proton Competition	Porsche 911 GT3 R (992.2)	8	5	3	2	3	5	72
5	(Switzerland) #57 Kessel Racing	Ferrari 296 GT3 Evo	3	1	11	Ret	4	13	52
6	(United Kingdom) #86 GR Racing	Ferrari 296 GT3 Evo	Ret	3	7	1	8	9	52
7	(Switzerland) #55 Spirit of Race	Ferrari 296 GT3 Evo	6	4	9	7	5	12	38
8	(Denmark) #54 High Class Racing	Porsche 911 GT3 R (992.2)	11	8	5	9	7	3	37
9	(Italy) #51 AF Corse	Ferrari 296 GT3 Evo	9	DSQ	6	4	Ret	6	30
10	(United Kingdom) #23 United Autosports	McLaren 720S GT3 Evo	2	Ret	Ret	10	9	10	22
11	(Italy) #50 Richard Mille AF Corse	Ferrari 296 GT3 Evo	5	Ret	8	Ret	WD	7	20
12	(Italy) #63 Iron Lynx	Mercedes-AMG GT3 Evo	7	6	Ret	8	Ret	Ret	18
13	(France) #59 Racing Spirit of Léman	Aston Martin Vantage AMR GT3 Evo	10	9	Ret	**12**	10	4	17
14	(Switzerland) #74 Kessel Racing	Ferrari 296 GT3 Evo	12	Ret	10	11	Ret	11	1
