= Sebastian Gravlund =

Danish racing driver (born 2004)

- Gravlund at Silverstone Circuit in 2026
- Nationality: (Denmark) Danish
- Born: 21 December 2004 (age 21) Smørumnedre, Denmark
- Categorisation: FIA Silver

Sebastian Gravlund (born 21 December 2004) is a Danish racing driver who last competed for Ultimate in the LMP3 class of the European Le Mans Series.

== Career ==
Gravlund made his single-seater debut in late 2021, racing in the last three rounds of the F4 Danish Championship for Team Formula Sport, taking a lone podium at Jyllands-Ringen by finishing third in race one as he ended the season ninth in points.

Returning to Team Formula Sport and the F4 Danish Championship the following year, winning all three races in the season-opening round at Padborg Park, before taking further wins at Ring Djursland and Padborg Park to end the year runner-up in points.

In parallel to his campaign in Danish F4, Gravlund joined MP Motorsport to race in the F4 Spanish Championship, taking three points finishes with a best result of seventh at Barcelona as he ended the year 21st in points. Staying with MP Motorsport for his step up to Eurocup-3, Gravlund scored points six times with a best result of sixth at Aragón en route to a 13th-place points finish.

Switching to prototype competition the following year, Gravlund joined Inter Europol Competition to make his LMP3 debut in the second round of the Prototype Winter Series. Racing in two of the season's four rounds, Gravlund finished second on debut at Algarve, before ending the winter with a third-place finish at Barcelona. Gravlund then continued with the team as he competed in all but one rounds of the Le Mans Cup, scoring points at Barcelona and Algarve, and taking a best result of ninth in the latter. At the end of the season, Gravlund partook in the European Le Mans Series rookie tests at Algarve, testing LMP3 machinery for DKR Engineering.

Remaining in LMP3 competition for 2025, Gravlund began the year by racing for EuroInternational in the European Le Mans Series alongside Fabien Michal and Ian Aguilera. Following a retirement in the season-opening race at Barcelona, Gravlund left the team ahead of the following round in Le Castellet. Gravlund then joined Team Virage for a one-off appearance at the Le Mans round of the Le Mans Cup alonside Rik Koen. After finishing sixth in race one and nineteenth in race two, Gravlund remained with the team for the remaining three rounds, replacing Sacha Lehmann in the team's No. 16 car. Racing alongside Theo Micouris, Gravlund finished third on debut at Spa before rounding out the season with an eighth at Silverstone and a fifth at Algarve. Following this, Gravlund tested for LMP3 machinery for RLR MSport in the European Le Mans Series rookie tests in Algarve.

In 2026, Gravlund joined Ultimate for his return to the LMP3 class of the European Le Mans Series. In his first full ELMS season, Gravlund took a best result of fourth at Le Castellet to finish 11th in the LMP3 standings. Towards the end of the year, Gravlund partook in the ELMS rookie tests for DKR Engineering in LMP3.

== Karting record ==
=== Karting career summary ===
Season	Series	Team	Position
2013	Danish Karting Championship – Cadet Mini		9th
2014	Danish Karting Championship – Cadet Mini		9th
2015	Danish Karting Championship – Cadet Junior		16th
2016	Andrea Margutti Trophy – 60 Mini	JN Motorsport	30th
2016	WSK Super Master Series – 60 Mini	CRG Holland	95th
2017	WSK Champions Cup – 60 Mini	Evokart	NC
2017	WSK Super Master Series – 60 Mini	Evokart	14th
2017	Andrea Margutti Trophy – 60 Mini	Evokart	17th
2017	Deutsche Kart-Meisterschaft – OK-J		37th
2017	Trofeo Delle Industrie – OK-J	Chiesa Corse	24th
2017	WSK Final Cup – OK-J	Chiesa Corse	43rd
2018	WSK Champions Cup – OK-J	TB Racing Team	NC
2018	WSK Super Master Series – OK-J	KR Motorsport	58th
2018	South Garda Winter Cup – OK-J	KR Motorsport	NC
2018	Karting European Championship – OK-J	KR Motorsport	30th
2018	WSK Open Cup – OK-J	KR Motorsport	10th
2018	Karting World Championship – OK-J	KR Motorsport	NC
2018	WSK Final Cup – OK-J	KR Motorsport	24th
2019	South Garda Winter Cup – OK	KR Motorsport	NC
2019	WSK Super Master Series – OK	KR Motorsport	50th
2019	WSK Euro Series – OK	KR Motorsport	21st
2019	Championnat de France – OK	KR Motorsport	55th
2019	Karting European Championship – OK	KR Motorsport	29th
2019	Karting World Championship – OK	KR Motorsport	NC
2019	WSK Open Cup – OK	KR Motorsport	19th
2019	WSK Final Cup – OK	KR Motorsport	NC
2020	WSK Champions Cup – OK	Ricky Flynn Motorsport	21st
2020	WSK Super Master Series – OK	Ricky Flynn Motorsport	48th
2020	South Garda Winter Cup – OK	Ricky Flynn Motorsport	NC
2020	Karting European Championship – OK	Ricky Flynn Motorsport	51st
2020	WSK Euro Series – OK	Ricky Flynn Motorsport	29th
2020	Champions of the Future – OK	Ricky Flynn Motorsport; Kosmic Racing Department (Note: Gravlund competed for Ricky Flynn Motorsport in round 1 and for Kosmic Racing Department in round 2.)	38th
2020	Karting World Championship – OK	Kosmic Racing Department	NC
2021	WSK Champions Cup – OK	Kosmic Racing Department	41st
2021	WSK Super Master Series – OK	Kosmic Racing Department	31st
2021	WSK Euro Series – OK	Kosmic Racing Department	24th
2021	Champions of the Future – OK	Kosmic Racing Department	41st
2021	Karting European Championship – OK	Kosmic Racing Department	31st

== Racing record ==
=== Racing career summary ===
Season	Series	Team	Races	Wins	Poles	F/Laps	Podiums	Points	Position
2021	F4 Danish Championship	Team Formula Sport	9	0	0	0	1	73	9th
2022	F4 Danish Championship	Team Formula Sport	16	5	2	4	12	273	**2nd**
2022	F4 Spanish Championship	MP Motorsports	21	0	0	0	0	8	21st
2023	Eurocup-3	MP Motorsport	15	0	0	0	0	28	13th
2024	Prototype Winter Series – Class 3	Inter Europol Competition	2	0	1	0	2	14.29	8th
2024	Le Mans Cup – LMP3	Inter Europol Competition	5	0	0	0	0	5	27th
2024	Ultimate Cup Series – Proto P3	Inter Europol Competition	1	0	0	0	0	2	50th
2025	European Le Mans Series – LMP3	EuroInternational	1	0	0	0	0	0	16th
2025	Le Mans Cup – LMP3	Team Virage	5	0	0	0	1	29	10th
2026	European Le Mans Series – LMP3	Ultimate	6	0	0	0	0	42	11th

=== Complete F4 Danish Championship results ===
(key) (Races in bold indicate pole position) (Races in italics indicate fastest lap) (Races with * indicate most race laps led)

Year	Team	1	2	3	4	5	6	7	8	9	10	11	12	13	14	15	16	17	18	19	Rank	Points
2021	Team Formula Sport	PAD1; 1	PAD1; 2	PAD1; 3	PAD2; 1	PAD2; 2	PAD2; 3	JYL1; 1	JYL1; 2	JYL1; 3	PAD3; 1; 6	PAD3; 2; 6	PAD3; 3; 5	DJU; 1; 7	DJU; 2; 6	DJU; 3; 7	JYL2; 1; 3	JYL2; 2; 4	JYL2; 3 Ret		9th	73
2022	Team Formula Sport	PAD1; 1; 1	PAD1; 2; 1	PAD1; 3; 1	STU; 1	STU; 2	STU; 3	JYL1; 1; 5	JYL1; 2; 2	JYL1; 3; 2	DJU; 1 DSQ	DJU; 2; 4	DJU; 3; 1	DJU; 4; 2	**PAD2**; **1**; 2	PAD2; 2; 7	PAD2; 3; 1	**JYL2**; **1**; 2	JYL2; 2; 3	JYL2; 3; 3	2nd	273

=== Complete F4 Spanish Championship results ===
(key) (Races in bold indicate pole position) (Races in italics indicate fastest lap)

Year	Team	1	2	3	4	5	6	7	8	9	10	11	12	13	14	15	16	17	18	19	20	21	DC	Points
2022	MP Motorsports	ALG; 1; 13	ALG; 2; 20	ALG; 3; 12	JER; 1 Ret	JER; 2; 17	JER; 3; 22	CRT; 1; 11	CRT; 2; 26	CRT; 3; 23	SPA; 1; 19	SPA; 2 Ret	SPA; 3; 19	ARA; 1; 16	ARA; 2; 17	ARA; 3 Ret	NAV; 1; 12	NAV; 2; 9	NAV; 3; 22	CAT; 1; 11	CAT; 2; 12	CAT; 3; 7	21st	8

=== Complete Eurocup-3 results ===
(key) (Races in bold indicate pole position) (Races in italics indicate fastest lap)

Year	Team	1	2	3	4	5	6	7	8	9	10	11	12	13	14	15	16	DC	Points
2023	MP Motorsport	SPA; 1; 12	SPA; 2; 12	ARA; 1; 6	ARA; 2 Ret	MNZ; 1 NC	MNZ; 2 Ret	ZAN; 1; 8	ZAN; 2 DNS	JER; 1; 7	JER; 2; 13	EST; 1; 17	EST; 2; 9	CRT; 1; 8	CRT; 2; 8	CAT; 1; 12	CAT; 2; 11	13th	28

=== Complete Le Mans Cup results ===
(key) (Races in bold indicate pole position; results in italics indicate fastest lap)

Year	Entrant	Class	Chassis	1	2	3	4	5	6	7	Rank	Points
2024	Inter Europol Competition	LMP3	Ligier JS P320	CAT; 10	LEC; 22	LMS; 1 WD	LMS; 2; 20	SPA; Ret	MUG	ALG; 9	27th	5
2025	Team Virage	LMP3	Ligier JS P325	CAT	LEC	LMS; 1; 6	LMS; 2; 19	SPA; 3	SIL; 8	ALG; 5	10th	29

=== Complete European Le Mans Series results ===
(key) (Races in bold indicate pole position; results in italics indicate fastest lap)

Year	Entrant	Class	Chassis	Engine	1	2	3	4	5	6	Rank	Points
2025	EuroInternational	LMP3	Ligier JS P325	Toyota V35A 3.5 L V6	CAT; Ret	LEC	IMO	SPA	SIL	ALG	16th	0
2026	Ultimate	LMP3	Ligier JS P325	Toyota V35A 3.5 L V6	CAT; 6	LEC; 4	IMO; 7	SPA; 8	SIL; 6	ALG; 8	11th	42

^{*} Season still in progress.
