= Aurelia Nobels =

Brazilian, Belgian, and American racing driver (born 2007)

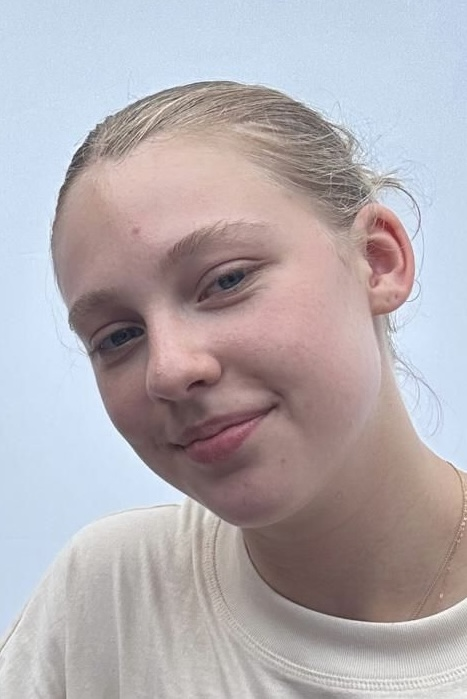
- Nobels at the 2025 Singapore Grand Prix
- Born: Aurelia Corine Nobels; January 7, 2007 (age 19); Boston, Massachusetts, U.S.
- Nationality: (Brazil) Brazilian (Belgium) Belgian (United States) American via triple nationality

GB3 Championship career
- Debut season: 2026
- Current team: Hillspeed
- Car number: 12
- Starts: 23
- Wins: 0
- Podiums: 0
- Poles: 0
- Fastest laps: 1
- Best finish: 18th in 2026

Previous series
- 2025 2024–2025 2024 2024 2024 2023–2024 2023 2022 2022 2022: Eurocup-4 Spanish Winter; F1 Academy; F4 British; F4 Saudi Arabian; F4 UAE; Euro 4 / E4; Italian F4; F4 Brazilian; F4 Spanish; F4 Danish
- Statistics up to date as of 20 November 2026.

Aurelia Corine Nobels (born January 7, 2007) is a Brazilian, Belgian, and American racing driver who last competed in the GB3 Championship with Hillspeed.

Nobels previously competed in F1 Academy for ART Grand Prix as part of the Ferrari Driver Academy with support from Puma in 2024 and 2025.

== Career ==
=== Karting ===
Nobels started karting at the age of ten in Brazil. She competed in the European Championships and the World Championships.

=== Lower formula ===
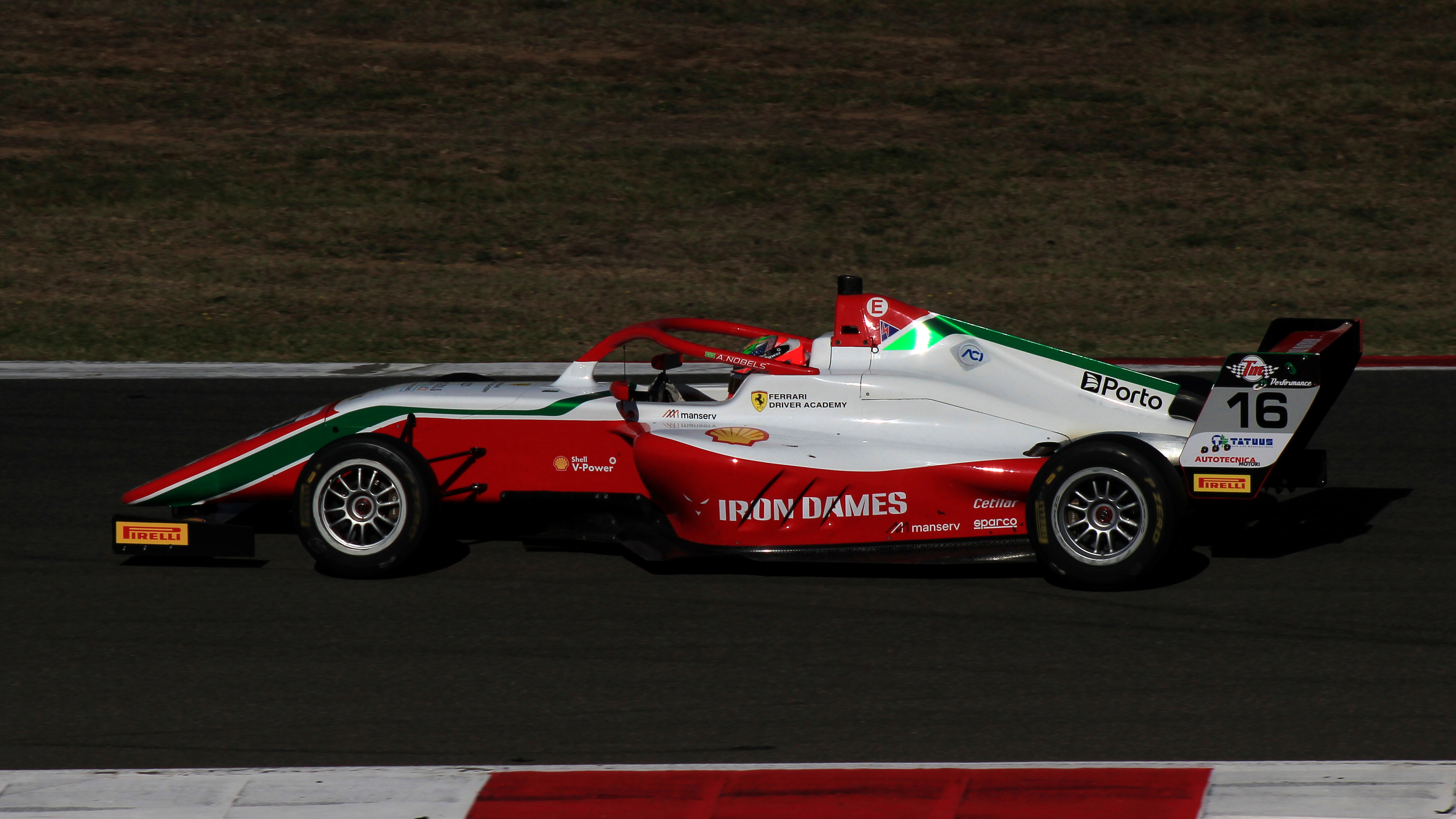
Nobels racing in Italian F4 at Mugello in 2023.

Nobels made her car racing debut in the F4 Brazilian Championship in 2022 with TMG Racing. She finished the season 16th with seven points. She also made a one-off appearance in F4 Spanish Championship. She competed in one round of the F4 Danish Championship where she scored ten points.

In 2023, Nobels competed in the Italian F4 Championship. She was supposed to start for Iron Lynx but later changed to Prema Racing, finishing 26th overall.

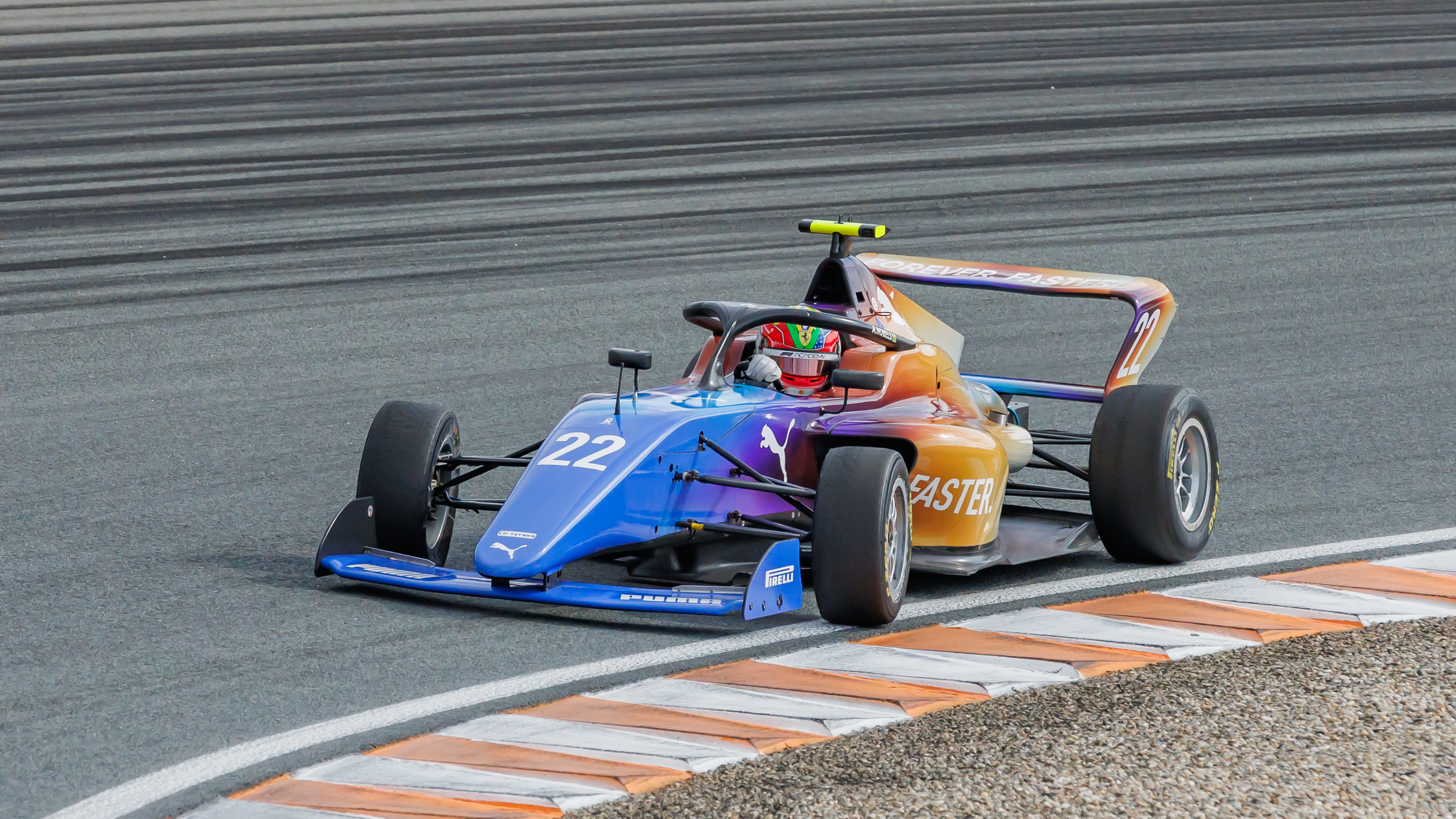
Nobels competing in an F1 Academy race at Zandvoort in 2024.

=== F1 Academy ===
==== 2024 ====
For the 2024 season, she signed with ART Grand Prix to join the F1 Academy grid, with backing from Puma. She finished 12th in the overall standings, with 29 points. Her highest finish was fifth place in Race 2 at Zandvoort.

==== 2025 ====
Nobels continued with Puma and ART Grand Prix for the 2025 season. She earned her maiden podium and highest F1 Academy finish in third place at Race 1 in Las Vegas.

=== GB3 ===
In 2026, Nobels moved to GB3 after two years in F1 Academy, joining Hillspeed.

=== FIA Girls on Track - Rising Stars ===
In December 2022, Nobels won the Senior category of the "Girls on Track – Rising Stars" – programme organized by the FIA Women in Motorsport Commission, and was awarded a place in the Ferrari Driver Academy. She departed the academy at the end of 2025, after concluding her two-year stint in F1 Academy.

== Personal life ==
Nobels was born in Boston to Belgian parents and grew up in Brazil.

Nobels has competed under the flags of both Brazil and Belgium. By virtue of jus soli, otherwise known as birthright citizenship, she is also a United States citizen.

Nobels speaks English, Portuguese, French, Italian, and Spanish.

== Racing record ==
=== Racing career summary ===
Season	Series	Team	Races	Wins	Poles	F/Laps	Podiums	Points	Position
2022	F4 Brazilian Championship	TMG Racing	12	0	0	0	0	7	16th
2022	F4 Danish Championship	STEP Motorsport	3	0	0	0	0	10	18th
2022	F4 Spanish Championship	Fórmula de Campeones	3	0	0	0	0	0	39th
2023	Italian F4 Championship	Prema Racing	16	0	0	0	0	0	26th
2023	Euro 4 Championship	Prema Racing	8	0	0	0	0	0	22nd
2024	Formula 4 UAE Championship	Saintéloc Racing	6	0	0	0	0	0	38th
2024	F1 Academy	ART Grand Prix	14	0	0	0	0	29	12th
2024	Euro 4 Championship	ART Grand Prix	3	0	0	0	0	0	29th
2024	F4 Saudi Arabian Championship	Altawkilat Meritus.GP	4	0	0	0	1	26	11th
2024	F4 British Championship	Phinsys by Argenti	3	0	0	0	0	9	26th
2025	Eurocup-4 Spanish Winter Championship	ART Grand Prix	5	0	0	0	0	0	27th
2025	F1 Academy	ART Grand Prix	14	0	0	0	1	17	13th
2025	E4 Championship	AS Motorsport	3	0	0	0	0	0	40th
2026	GB3 Championship	Hillspeed	23	0	0	1	0	105	18th

* Season still in progress.

=== Complete F4 Brazilian Championship results ===
(key) (Races in bold indicate pole position) (Races in italics indicate fastest lap)

Year	Entrant	1	2	3	4	5	6	7	8	9	10	11	12	13	14	15	16	17	18	Pos	Points
2022	TMG Racing	MOG1; 1 Ret	MOG1; 2; 15†	MOG1; 3; 12	INT1; 1; 13	INT1; 2; 15	INT1; 3; 16	INT2; 1; 10	INT2; 2; 10	INT2; 3; 12	MOG2; 1; 9	MOG2; 2; 12	MOG2; 3; 8	GYN; 1	GYN; 2	GYN; 3	INT3; 1	INT3; 2	INT3; 3	16th	7

=== Complete F4 Danish Championship results ===
(key) (Races in bold indicate pole position) (Races in italics indicate fastest lap)

Year	Entrant	1	2	3	4	5	6	7	8	9	10	11	12	13	14	15	16	17	18	19	Pos	Points
2022	STEP Motorsport	PAD1; 1	PAD1; 2	PAD1; 3	STU; 1	STU; 2	STU; 3	JYL1; 1; 8	JYL1; 2 Ret	JYL1; 3; 7	DJU; 1	DJU; 2	DJU; 3	DJU; 4	PAD2; 1	PAD2; 2	PAD2; 3	JYL2; 1	JYL2; 2	JYL2; 3	18th	10

=== Complete F4 Spanish Championship results ===
(key) (Races in bold indicate pole position) (Races in italics indicate fastest lap)

Year	Entrant	1	2	3	4	5	6	7	8	9	10	11	12	13	14	15	16	17	18	19	20	21	Pos	Points
2022	Fórmula de Campeones	ALG; 1	ALG; 2	ALG; 3	JER; 1	JER; 2	JER; 3	CRT; 1	CRT; 2	CRT; 3	SPA; 1; 23	SPA; 2; 28	SPA; 3; 24	ARA; 1	ARA; 2	ARA; 3	NAV; 1	NAV; 2	NAV; 3	CAT; 1	CAT; 2	CAT; 3	39th	0

=== Complete Italian F4 Championship results ===
(key) (Races in bold indicate pole position) (Races in italics indicate fastest lap)

Year	Entrant	1	2	3	4	5	6	7	8	9	10	11	12	13	14	15	16	17	18	19	20	21	22	Pos	Points
2023	Prema Racing	IMO; 1; 21	IMO; 2; 11	IMO; 3	IMO; 4; 17	MIS; 1; 27†	MIS; 2 DNS	MIS; 3 WD	SPA; 1	SPA; 2	SPA; 3	MNZ; 1; 21	MNZ; 2 Ret	MNZ; 3; 18	LEC; 1; 14	LEC; 2 Ret	LEC; 3; 19	MUG; 1; 22	MUG; 2 Ret	MUG; 3; 22	VLL; 1; 22	VLL; 2; 17	VLL; 3; 24	26th	0

=== Complete Euro 4/E4 Championship results ===
(key) (Races in bold indicate pole position; races in italics indicate fastest lap)

Year	Entrant	1	2	3	4	5	6	7	8	9	Pos	Points
2023	Prema Racing	MUG; 1; 19	MUG; 2; 22	MUG; 3; 20	MNZ; 1; 15	MNZ; 2 Ret	MNZ; 3 WD	CAT; 1; 13	CAT; 2; 11	CAT; 3; 17	22nd	0
2024	ART Grand Prix	MUG; 1	MUG; 2	MUG; 3	RBR; 1	RBR; 2	RBR; 3	MNZ; 1; 14	MNZ; 2; 27	MNZ; 3; 26	29th	0
2025	AS Motorsport	LEC; 1	LEC; 2	LEC; 3	MUG; 1; 23	MUG; 2; 33	MUG; 3; 23	MNZ; 1	MNZ; 2	MNZ; 3	40th	0

=== Complete F4 British Championship results ===
(key) (Races in bold indicate pole position; races in italics indicate fastest lap; ^{superscript} indicates points for positions gained)

Year	Entrant	1	2	3	4	5	6	7	8	9	10	11	12	13	14	15	16	17	18	19	20	21	22	23	24	25	26	27	28	29	30	31	32	Pos	Points
2024	Phinsys by Argenti	DPN; 1	DPN; 2	DPN; 3	BHI; 1	BHI; 2	BHI; 3	SNE; 1	SNE; 2	SNE; 3	THR; 1	THR; 2	THR; 3	SILGP; 1	SILGP; 2	SILGP; 3	ZAN; 1; 23	ZAN; 2; 18^{9}	ZAN; 3; 16	KNO; 1	KNO; 2	KNO; 3	DPGP; 1	DPGP; 2	DPGP; 3	DPGP; 4	SILN; 1	SILN; 2	SILN; 3	BHGP; 1	BHGP; 2	BHGP; 3	BHGP; 4	26th	9

=== Complete Formula 4 UAE Championship results ===
(key) (Races in bold indicate pole position; races in italics indicate fastest lap)

Year	Entrant	1	2	3	4	5	6	7	8	9	10	11	12	13	14	15	Pos	Points
2024	Saintéloc Racing	YMC1; 1; 32	YMC1; 2; 25	YMC1; 3; 25	YMC2; 1; 19	YMC2; 2 Ret	YMC2; 3; 26	DUB1; 1	DUB1; 2	DUB1; 3	YMC3; 1	YMC3; 2	YMC3; 3	DUB2; 1	DUB2; 2	DUB2; 3	38th	0

=== Complete F4 Saudi Arabian Championship results ===
(key) (Races in bold indicate pole position; races in italics indicate fastest lap)

Year	Entrant	1	2	3	4	5	6	7	8	9	10	11	12	13	14	15	16	17	Pos	Points
2024	Altawkilat Meritus.GP	KMT1; 1	KMT1; 2	KMT1; 3	KMT1; 4	LSL; 1; 8	LSL; 2; 6	LSL; 3; 7	LSL; 4; 3	JED1; 1	JED1; 2	JED1; 3	JED2; 1	JED2; 2	JED2; 3	JED3; 1	JED3; 2	JED3; 3	11th	26

=== Complete F1 Academy results ===
(key) (Races in bold indicate pole position; races in italics indicate points for the fastest lap of the points finishers)

Year	Team	1	2	3	4	5	6	7	8	9	10	11	12	13	14	15	DC	Points
2024	ART Grand Prix	JED; 1; 7	JED; 2 Ret	MIA; 1; 13	MIA; 2; 13	CAT; 1; 13	CAT; 2; 14	ZAN; 1; 7	ZAN; 2; 5	SIN; 1; 14	SIN; 2; 12	LSL; 1; 9	LSL; 2 C	YMC; 1; 10	YMC; 2; 11	YMC; 2; 8	12th	29
2025	ART Grand Prix	SHA; 1 Ret	SHA; 2 Ret	JED; 1; 10	JED; 2; 11	MIA; 1; 6	MIA; 2 C	MTL; 1; 9	MTL; 2; 13	MTL; 3 Ret	ZAN; 1; 9	ZAN; 2; 14	SIN; 1; 4	SIN; 2; 12	LVG; 1; 3	LVG; 2; 10	13th	17

=== Complete Eurocup-4 Spanish Winter Championship results ===
(key) (Races in bold indicate pole position) (Races in italics indicate fastest lap)

Year	Entrant	1	2	3	4	5	6	7	8	9	Pos	Points
2025	ART Grand Prix	JER; 1; 17	JER; 2 DNS	JER; 3; 15	POR; 1; 14	POR; 2; 19	POR; 3; 28	NAV; 1	NAV; 2	NAV; 3	28th	0

=== Complete GB3 Championship results ===
(key) (Races in bold indicate pole position; races in italics indicate fastest lap; ^{superscript} indicates points for positions gained)

Year	Entrant	1	2	3	4	5	6	7	8	9	10	11	12	13	14	15	16	17	18	19	20	21	22	23	24	Pos	Points
2026	Hillspeed	SIL1; 1; 15	SIL1; 2; 15	SIL1; 3; 19	SPA; 1; 14	SPA; 2; 20	SPA; 3 C	HUN; 1 Ret	HUN; 2; 8	HUN; 3; 15	RBR; 1 Ret	RBR; 2; 12	RBR; 3; 8^{5}	SIL2; 1; 18	SIL2; 2; 16	SIL2; 3; 19	DON; 1; 14	DON; 2; 15	DON; 3; 13^{4}	BRH; 1; 16	BRH; 2 Ret	BRH; 3 Ret	CAT; 1 Ret	CAT; 2; 18	CAT; 3; 4	18th	105
