= 2021 F4 Danish Championship =

Motor racing competition

Seasons
- ← 2020 2022 →

The 2021 F4 Danish Championship season was the fifth season of the F4 Danish Championship. The season began at Padborg Park in May and concluded at Jyllandsringen in October.

Mads Hoe became the drivers' champion, having driven for his own team in F5 machinery.

== Teams and drivers ==
Formula 4 entries
Team	No.	Drivers	Class	Rounds
(Denmark) Team Formula Sport	1	(Denmark) Sebastian Gravlund	R	4–6
(Denmark) Team Formula Sport	9	(Denmark) Frederik Lund	R	5–6
(Denmark) FSP Racing	3	(Denmark) Morten Strømsted	R	3, 6
(Denmark) FSP Racing	20	(Mexico) Jesse Carrasquedo Jr.		2, 4
(Denmark) FSP Racing	22	(Denmark) William Wulf		All
(Denmark) FSP Racing	75	(Denmark) Noah Strømsted	R	3–6
(Denmark) FSP Racing	77	(Brazil) Emerson Fittipaldi Jr.	R	All
(Japan) Noda Racing	10	(Japan) Juju Noda		All
(Denmark) SD Racing	11	(Denmark) Frederik Stenå	R	1–5
(Denmark) SD Racing	11	(Denmark) Ann-Sofie Degel	R	6
(Denmark) Henriksen Racing	15	(Denmark) Michella Rasmussen	R	4–6
(Denmark) Henriksen Racing	16	(Denmark) Peter Henriksen		1–2, 4–6
(Denmark) J.E.L Racing	18	(Denmark) Laura Lylloff	R	1–4, 6
(Denmark) J.E.L Racing	97	(Denmark) Jan Lylloff		3–4, 6
Formula 5 entries
(Denmark) Mads Hoe Motorsport	7	(Denmark) Jacob S. Bjerring		All
(Denmark) Mads Hoe Motorsport	47	(Denmark) Mads Hoe		All
(Denmark) Mads Hoe Motorsport	56	(Denmark) Mille Hoe		All
(Denmark) Mads Hoe Motorsport	69	(Denmark) Mads Riis	R	1–3, 5–6
(Denmark) Sønderskov Motorsport	39	(Denmark) Line Sønderskov		All

Icon	Class
R	Rookie

== Calendar ==
The first provisional calendar consisting of 5 rounds was published on 16 November 2020. The next 2 competitions were announced on 2 December 2020. The planned opening round at Padborg Park on 24–25 April was postponed to 15–16 May due to the pandemic restrictions and economic reasons. The round at Sturup Raceway was cancelled due to the travel restrictions between Denmark and Sweden.

Rnd.		Circuit/Location	Date	Supporting
1	R1	(Denmark) Padborg Park, Padborg	15–16 May	Historic meeting
1	R2	(Denmark) Padborg Park, Padborg	15–16 May	Historic meeting
1	R3	(Denmark) Padborg Park, Padborg	15–16 May	Historic meeting
–		(Sweden) Sturup Raceway, Svedala	12–13 June	Cancelled
2	R1	(Denmark) Padborg Park, Padborg	19–20 June	Super GT Denmark
2	R2	(Denmark) Padborg Park, Padborg	19–20 June	Super GT Denmark
2	R3	(Denmark) Padborg Park, Padborg	19–20 June	Super GT Denmark
3	R1	(Denmark) Jyllandsringen, Silkeborg	20–22 August	Super GT Denmark; TCR Denmark
3	R2	(Denmark) Jyllandsringen, Silkeborg	20–22 August	Super GT Denmark; TCR Denmark
3	R3	(Denmark) Jyllandsringen, Silkeborg	20–22 August	Super GT Denmark; TCR Denmark
4	R1	(Denmark) Padborg Park, Padborg	3–4 September	Super GT Denmark
4	R2	(Denmark) Padborg Park, Padborg	3–4 September	Super GT Denmark
4	R3	(Denmark) Padborg Park, Padborg	3–4 September	Super GT Denmark
5	R1	(Denmark) Ring Djursland, Pederstrup	18 September	Main Event
5	R2	(Denmark) Ring Djursland, Pederstrup	18 September	Main Event
5	R3	(Denmark) Ring Djursland, Pederstrup	18 September	Main Event
6	R1	(Denmark) Jyllandsringen, Silkeborg	2–3 October	TCR Denmark
6	R2	(Denmark) Jyllandsringen, Silkeborg	2–3 October	TCR Denmark
6	R3	(Denmark) Jyllandsringen, Silkeborg	2–3 October	TCR Denmark

== Race results ==
Rnd.		Circuit	Formula 4			Formula 5
Rnd.		Circuit	Pole position	Fastest lap	Winning driver	Winning driver
1	R1	(Denmark) Padborg Park	(Japan) Juju Noda (Note: Noda started second as Mads Hoe qualified for pole position in F5 machinery.)	(Japan) Juju Noda	(Japan) Juju Noda (Note: Mads Hoe was the overall winner of the race in F5 machinery.)	(Denmark) Mads Hoe
1	R2	(Denmark) Padborg Park		(Brazil) Emerson Fittipaldi Jr. (Note: Jacob S. Bjerring set the fastest lap in F5 machinery.)	(Japan) Juju Noda	(Denmark) Mads Hoe
1	R3	(Denmark) Padborg Park		(Denmark) William Wulf (Note: Mads Hoe set the fastest lap in F5 machinery.)	(Denmark) William Wulf	(Denmark) Mads Hoe
2	R1	(Denmark) Padborg Park	(Brazil) Emerson Fittipaldi Jr.	(Mexico) Jesse Carrasquedo Jr.	(Mexico) Jesse Carrasquedo Jr. (Note: Juju Noda finished first but was disqualified for causing a collision with Emerson Fittipaldi Jr.)	(Denmark) Jacob S. Bjerring
2	R2	(Denmark) Padborg Park		(Japan) Juju Noda	(Denmark) William Wulf	(Denmark) Mads Hoe
2	R3	(Denmark) Padborg Park		(Brazil) Emerson Fittipaldi Jr.	(Mexico) Jesse Carrasquedo Jr.	(Denmark) Mads Hoe
3	R1	(Denmark) Jyllandsringen	(Denmark) Noah Strømsted	(Denmark) Noah Strømsted	(Denmark) Noah Strømsted	(Denmark) Mads Hoe
3	R2	(Denmark) Jyllandsringen		(Denmark) Noah Strømsted	(Brazil) Emerson Fittipaldi Jr.	(Denmark) Mads Hoe
3	R3	(Denmark) Jyllandsringen		(Denmark) Noah Strømsted	(Denmark) Noah Strømsted	(Denmark) Mads Hoe
4	R1	(Denmark) Padborg Park	(Denmark) Noah Strømsted (Note: N. Strømsted started second as Mads Hoe qualified for pole position in F5 machinery.)	(Denmark) Noah Strømsted	(Denmark) Noah Strømsted	(Denmark) Mads Hoe
4	R2	(Denmark) Padborg Park		(Brazil) Emerson Fittipaldi Jr.	(Brazil) Emerson Fittipaldi Jr.	(Denmark) Jacob S. Bjerring
4	R3	(Denmark) Padborg Park		(Brazil) Emerson Fittipaldi Jr.	(Brazil) Emerson Fittipaldi Jr.	(Denmark) Mads Hoe
5	R1	(Denmark) Ring Djursland	(Denmark) Noah Strømsted	(Denmark) Noah Strømsted	(Denmark) Noah Strømsted	(Denmark) Mads Hoe
5	R2	(Denmark) Ring Djursland		(Denmark) Noah Strømsted	(Denmark) Noah Strømsted	(Denmark) Jacob S. Bjerring
5	R3	(Denmark) Ring Djursland		(Denmark) Noah Strømsted	(Denmark) Noah Strømsted	(Denmark) Mads Hoe
6	R1	(Denmark) Jyllandsringen	(Denmark) Noah Strømsted	(Denmark) Noah Strømsted	(Denmark) Noah Strømsted	(Denmark) Mads Hoe
6	R2	(Denmark) Jyllandsringen		(Denmark) Noah Strømsted	(Denmark) Noah Strømsted	(Denmark) Mads Hoe
6	R3	(Denmark) Jyllandsringen		(Denmark) Noah Strømsted	(Denmark) Noah Strømsted	(Denmark) Mads Hoe

== Championship standings ==
Points are awarded to the top 10 classified finishers in each race. No points are awarded for pole position or fastest lap.

Position	**1st**	**2nd**	**3rd**	**4th**	**5th**	**6th**	**7th**	**8th**	**9th**	**10th**
Points	25	18	15	12	10	8	6	4	2	1

=== Drivers' standings ===
Pos	Driver	PAD1 (Denmark)			PAD2 (Denmark)			JYL1 (Denmark)			PAD3 (Denmark)			DJU (Denmark)			JYL2 (Denmark)			Pts
Pos	Driver	R1	R2	R3	R1	R2	R3	R1	R2	R3	R1	R2	R3	R1	R2	R3	R1	R2	R3	Pts
1	(Denmark) Mads Hoe **(F5)**	**1**	1	1	3	2	3	2	3	2	**3**	5	1	**3**	Ret	4	4	2	2	299
2	(Denmark) Noah Strømsted **(R)**							**1**	2	1	1	Ret	DNS	1	1	1	**1**	1	1	243
3	(Brazil) Emerson Fittipaldi Jr. **(R)**	10†	4	3	**9†**	5	2	4	1	3	5	1	2	4	2	2	12	5	5	231
4	(Denmark) Jacob S. Bjerring **(F5)**	3	3	4	2	7	6	Ret	4	6	4	2	4	5	3	5	7	6	Ret	185
5	(Denmark) Mads Riis **(F5) (R)**	5	5	5	5	3	5	5	6	5				6	7	6	6	3	3	153
6	(Denmark) William Wulf	7	10	2	4	1	4	3	5	11†	Ret	4	3	Ret	5	3	Ret	DNS	DNS	151
7	(Japan) Juju Noda	2	2	8†	DSQ	6	11	DNS	DNS	4	2	3	Ret	2	4	Ret	5	8	4	149
8	(Denmark) Mille Hoe **(F5)**	6	6	Ret	7	10	8	7	7	9	7	7	8	8	10	10	9	7	7	77
9	(Denmark) Sebastian Gravlund **(R)**										6	6	5	7	6	7	3	4	Ret	73
10	(Denmark) Line Sønderskov **(F5)**	4	7	7	6	DSQ	7	6	Ret	8	8	Ret	DNS	9	8	9	11	9	8	68
11	(Mexico) Jesse Carrasquedo Jr.				1	4	1				EX (Note: Jesse Carrasquedo Jr. got excluded from the event for non-respect of flag signal in Race 3.)		DSQ							62
12	(Denmark) Frederik Stenå **(R)**	8	9	6	DNS	8	9	9†	8	7	Ret	11	7	DNS	9	13†				40
13	(Denmark) Peter Henriksen	9	8	9†	8	9	10				10	8	6	10	Ret	11	10	10	11	31
14	(Denmark) Frederik Lund **(R)**													Ret	DNS	8	2	Ret	6	30
15	(Denmark) Jan Lylloff							Ret	9	10	9	9	9				13	15	10	10
16	(Denmark) Laura Lylloff **(R)**	11	DNS	WD	10	DNS	12	8	10	Ret	Ret	10	10				Ret	13	13	8
17	(Denmark) Morten Strømsted **(R)**							DNS	DSQ	Ret							8	11	9	6
18	(Denmark) Michella Rasmussen **(R)**										11	12	11	Ret	11	12	15	14	14	0
19	(Denmark) Ann-Sofie Degel **(R)**																14	12	12	0
Pos	Driver	R1	R2	R3	R1	R2	R3	R1	R2	R3	R1	R2	R3	R1	R2	R3	R1	R2	R3	Pts
Pos	Driver	PAD1 (Denmark)			PAD2 (Denmark)			JYL1 (Denmark)			PAD3 (Denmark)			DJU (Denmark)			JYL2 (Denmark)			Pts

Colour	Result
Gold	Winner
Silver	Second place
Bronze	Third place
Green	Points classification
Blue	Non-points classification
Blue	Non-classified finish (NC)
Purple	Retired, not classified (Ret)
Red	Did not qualify (DNQ)
Red	Did not pre-qualify (DNPQ)
Black	Disqualified (DSQ)
White	Did not start (DNS)
White	Withdrew (WD)
White	Race cancelled (C)
Blank	Did not practice (DNP)
Blank	Did not arrive (DNA)
Blank	Excluded (EX)

**Bold** – Pole
Italics – Fastest Lap

- † – Driver did not finish the race, but was classified as they completed over 75% of the race distance.
