= Emerson Fittipaldi Jr. =

Brazilian racing driver (born 2007)

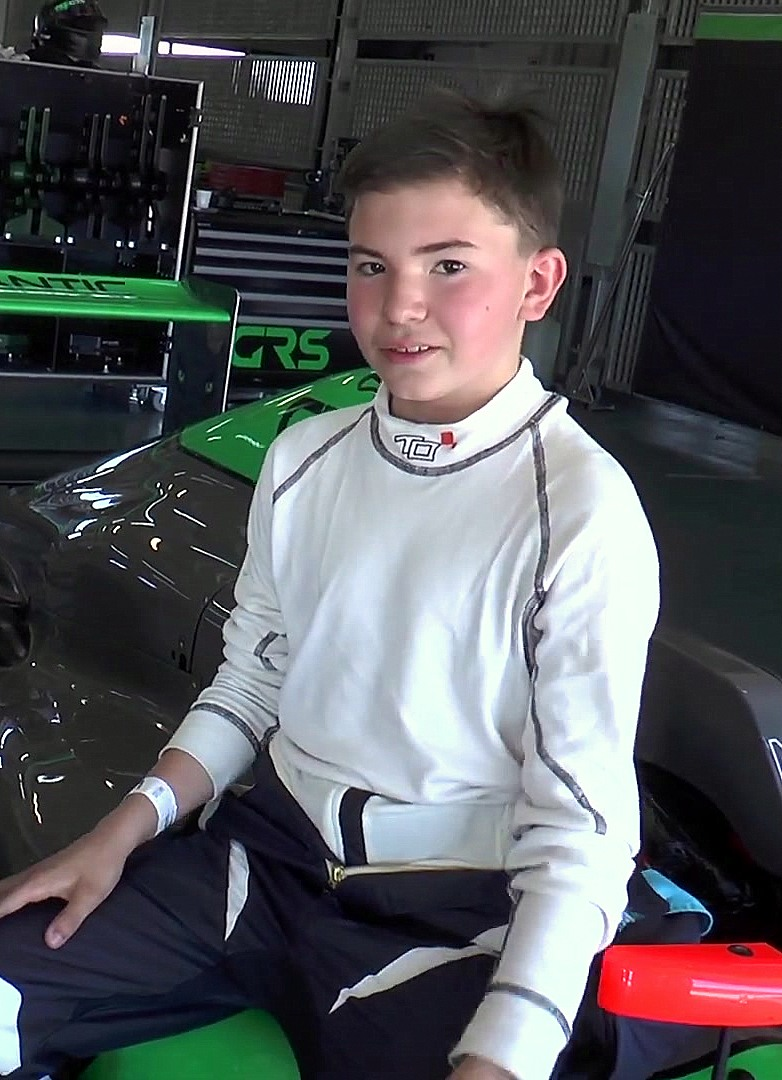
- Fittipaldi in 2021
- Nationality: (Brazil) Brazilian
- Born: 7 March 2007 (age 19) Miami, Florida, U.S.
- Relatives: Emerson Fittipaldi (father); Wilson Fittipaldi (uncle); Max Papis (brother-in-law); Pietro Fittipaldi (nephew); Enzo Fittipaldi (nephew); Christian Fittipaldi (cousin)

FIA Formula 2 Championship career
- Debut season: 2026
- Current team: AIX Racing
- Car number: 20
- Starts: 19
- Wins: 0
- Podiums: 1
- Poles: 0
- Fastest laps: 0
- Best finish: TBD in 2026

Previous series
- 2025; 2024–2025; 2024; 2023; 2022; 2022; 2021: Eurocup-3 Spanish Winter; Eurocup-3; FR Middle East; FR European; ADAC F4; Italian F4; F4 Danish
- Statistics up to date as of 12 September 2026.

Emerson "Emmo" Fittipaldi Jr. (born 7 March 2007) is a Brazilian-American racing driver currently competing in the FIA Formula 2 Championship with AIX Racing.

Fittipaldi previously raced in the Italian F4 Championship and is a former member of the Sauber Academy. He has raced in Eurocup-3 with MP Motorsport in 2024 and 2025, finishing fifth in the former.

Fittipaldi is the son of two-time Formula 1 champion Emerson Fittipaldi and nephew of Formula One driver Wilson Fittipaldi. His nephews, Pietro and Enzo Fittipaldi, are racing drivers.

== Career ==
=== Formula 4 ===
==== 2021 ====
Fittipaldi began his single-seater career in 2021, competing in the F4 Danish Championship with FSP Racing. His season started out with a podium at the season opener, before he scored his maiden pole position at the following round. Having fought for the win, Fittipaldi was involved in a late-race collision with Juju Noda, which forced Fittipaldi to retire from the race. After scoring a podium in Race 3, Fittipaldi took his first victory in car racing at Jyllandsringen in the third event. Another win followed at Padborg Park, before Fittipaldi took two further podiums in Djursland. He finished the season in third place, having amassed eight podiums.

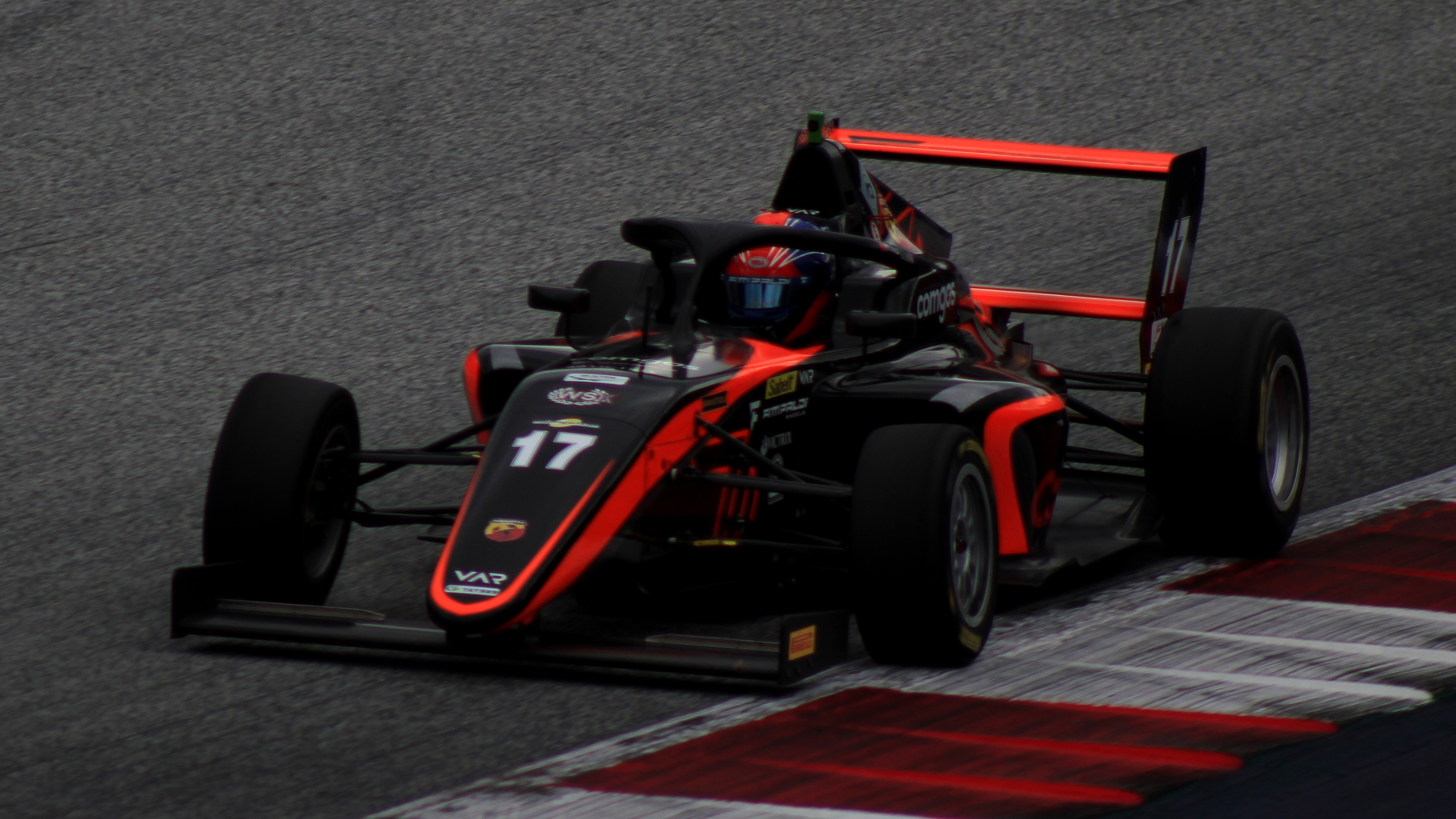
Fittipaldi driving at the Red Bull Ring during the 2022 Italian F4 Championship.

==== 2022 ====
The following year, Fittipaldi progressed into the Italian F4 Championship, where he completed a full season for Van Amersfoort Racing, whilst also taking part in two rounds of the ADAC Formula 4 Championship. He took four points and ended up 23rd in the drivers' standings.

=== FIA Formula 3 ===
In September 2022, Fittipaldi took part in the FIA Formula 3 post-season test, driving for Charouz Racing System on the first day.

=== Formula Regional ===
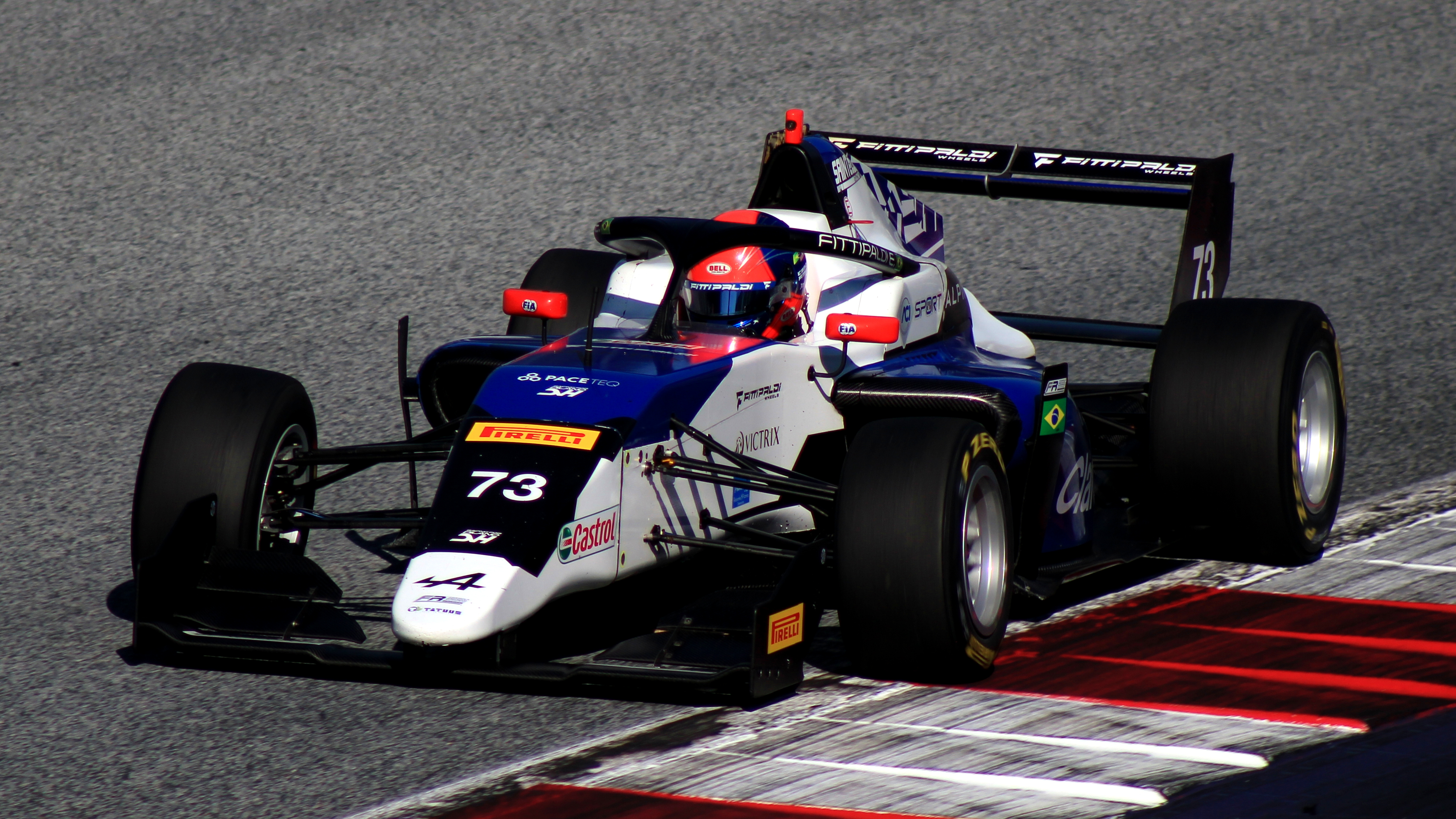
Fittipaldi racing in the 2023 Formula Regional European Championship at the Red Bull Ring.

==== 2023 ====
Fittipaldi stepped up to the Formula Regional European Championship in 2023 with Saintéloc Racing.

On 1 July 2023, at a FRECA race at Spa-Francorchamps, Fittipaldi was involved in a multi-car crash at Kemmel-Radillon initiated by Tim Tramnitz. One of the racers that crashed Dilano van 't Hoff, was killed in the incident.

==== 2024 ====
Fittipaldi would contest in the 2024 Formula Regional Middle East Championship with MP Motorsport.

=== Eurocup-3 ===
==== 2023 ====
Fittipaldi joined the GRS Team during the 2023 Eurocup-3 season ahead of the sixth round in Estoril. He would join Palou Motorsport for the final round in Circuit de Barcelona-Catalunya, where he scored a point with tenth place during the first race.

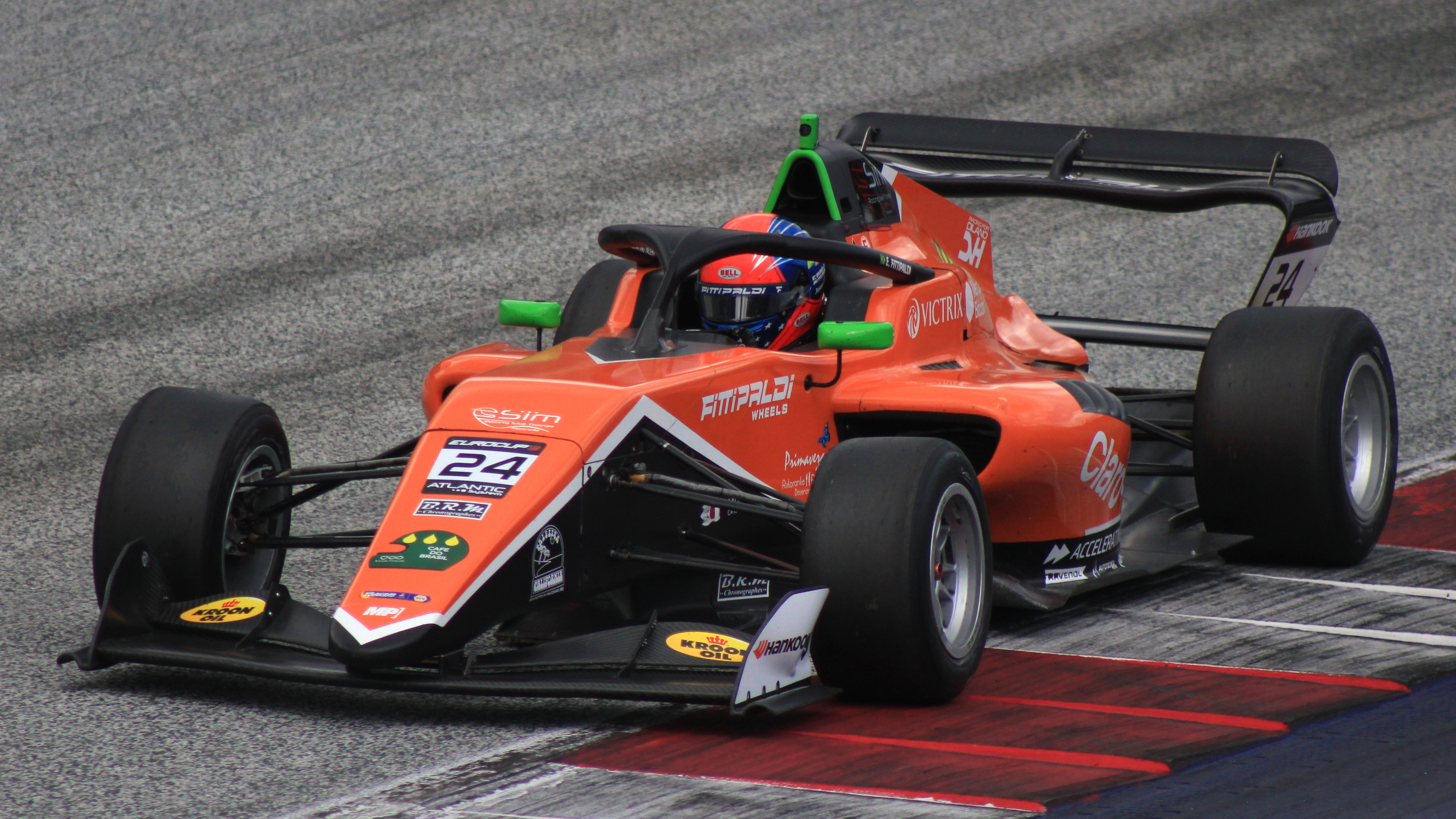
Fittipaldi racing at the Red Bull Ring during the 2024 Eurocup-3 season.

==== 2024 ====
Fittipaldi would then race a full season in Eurocup-3 for 2024, teaming up with MP Motorsport.

==== 2025 ====
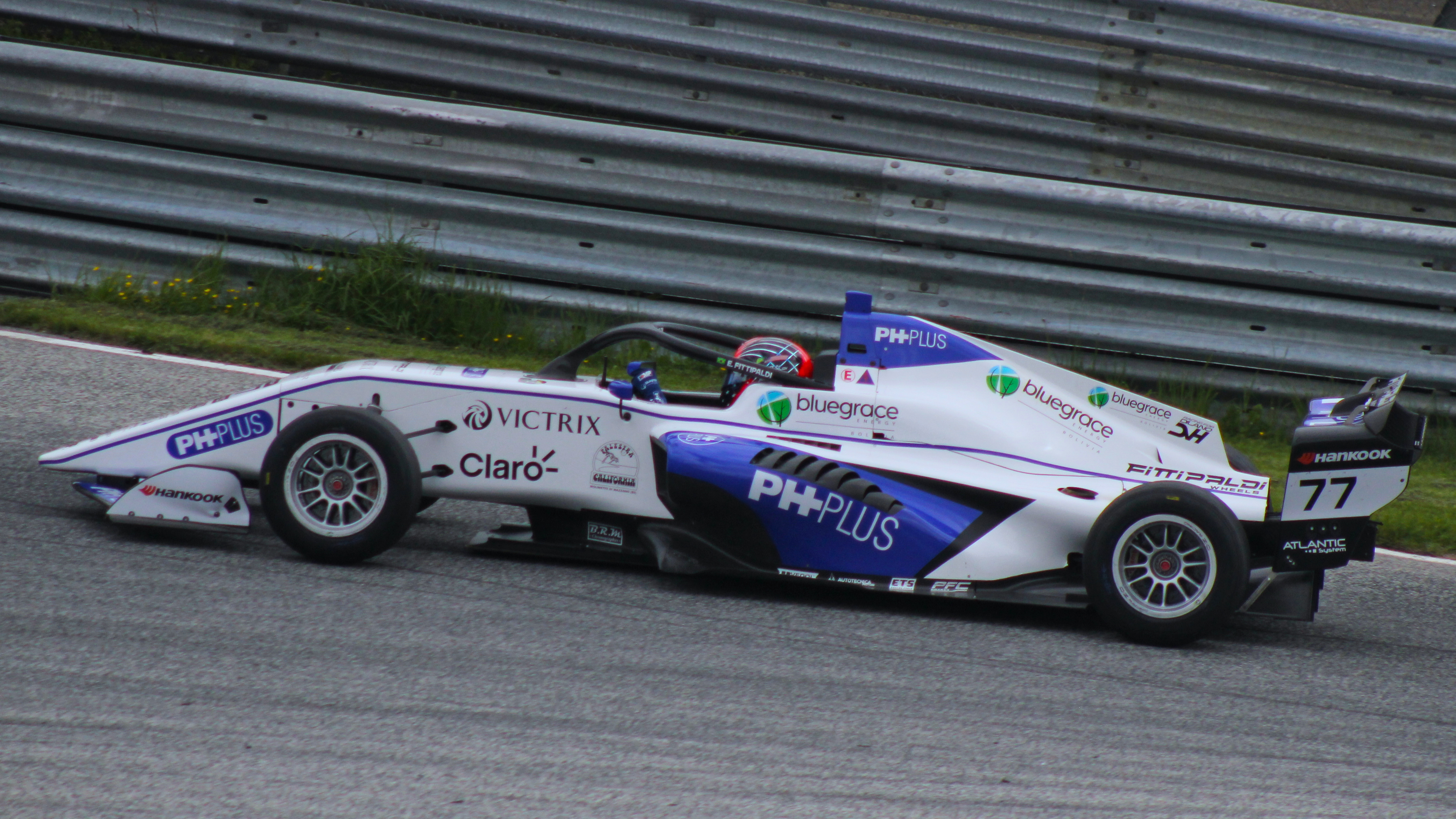
Fittipaldi driving at the Red Bull Ring during the 2025 Eurocup-3 season

Fittipaldi continued in Eurocup-3 for the 2025 season, remaining with MP Motorsport.

=== FIA Formula 2 Championship ===
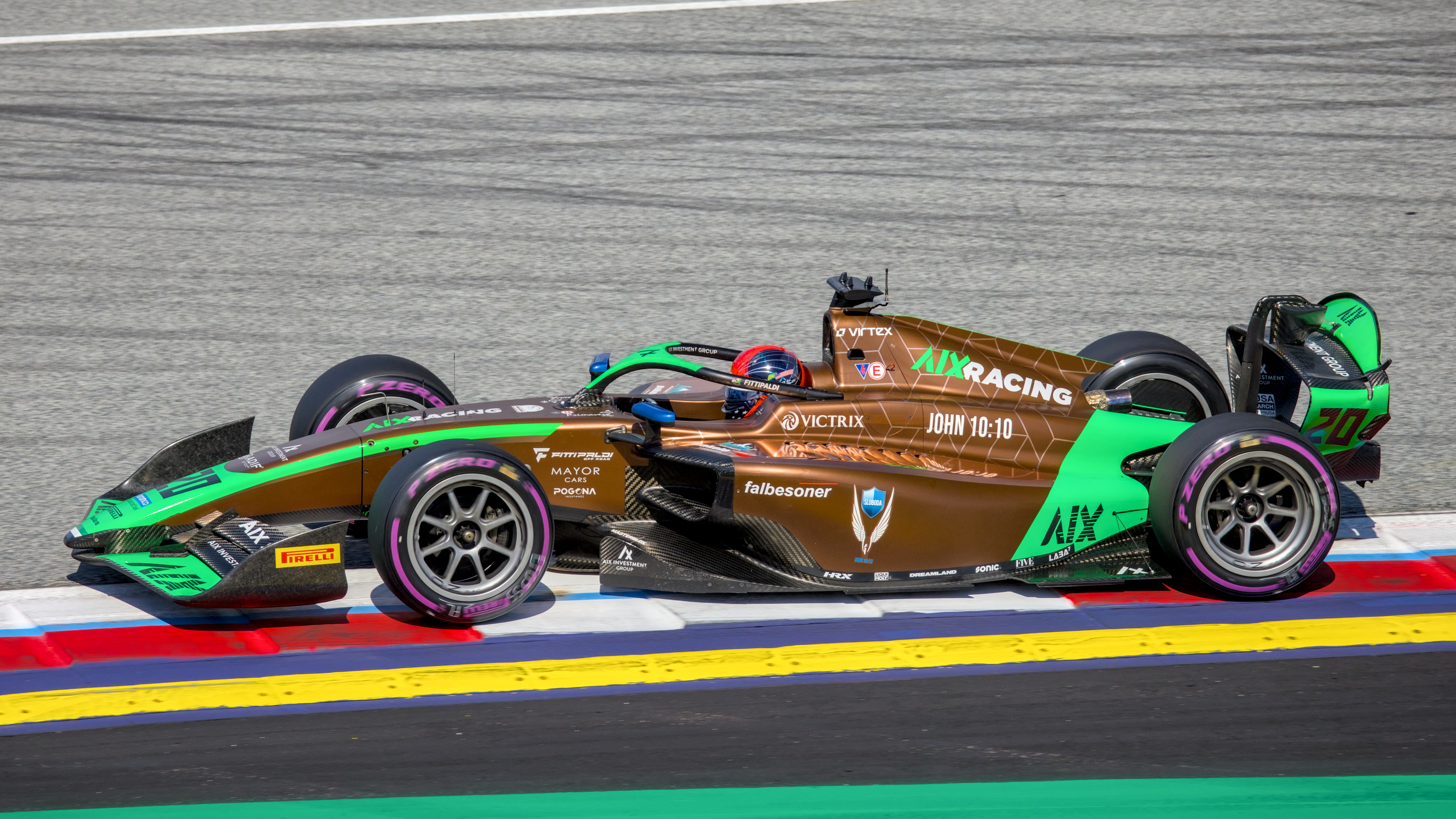
Fittipaldi driving the Dallara F2 2024 during the 2026 Spielberg Formula 2 round

In 2026, Fittipaldi made the step up to the FIA Formula 2 Championship with AIX Racing, graduating directly from Eurocup-3. By doing so, he joins a broader list of drivers who bypassed FIA Formula 3 to be promoted directly to Formula 2 from Formula Regional and equivalent regional series. Previous drivers to make a similar transition include Gianluca Petecof, Joshua Dürksen, and Andrea Kimi Antonelli from the Formula Regional European Championship (FRECA); Guilherme Samaia and Joshua Mason from the Euroformula Open; as well as John Bennett from the GB3 Championship.

=== Formula One ===
From 2020 to 2021, Fittipaldi was a member of the Sauber Academy.

In October 2022, Fittipaldi was a finalist in the Ferrari Driver Academy’s Scouting World Final.

== Personal life ==
Fittipaldi's father Emerson Fittipaldi is a two-time Formula One world champion, his uncle Wilson Fittipaldi Júnior and his cousin Christian Fittipaldi were Formula One drivers as well. His grandfather Wilson Fittipaldi Sr. was a motorsport journalist and radio commentator.. He is the uncle of both Pietro Fittipaldi and Enzo Fittipaldi, despite both of them being older than him.

== Racing record ==
=== Racing career summary ===
Season	Series	Team	Races	Wins	Poles	F/Laps	Podiums	Points	Position
2021	F4 Danish Championship	FSP Racing	18	2	1	2	8	231	**3rd**
2022	Italian F4 Championship	Van Amersfoort Racing	20	0	0	0	0	4	23rd
2022	ADAC Formula 4 Championship	Van Amersfoort Racing	6	0	0	0	0	0	NC†
2023	Formula Regional European Championship	Saintéloc Racing	20	0	0	0	0	4	24th
2023	Eurocup-3	GRS Team	2	0	0	0	0	1	19th
2023	Eurocup-3	Palou Motorsport	2	0	0	0	0	1	19th
2024	Formula Regional Middle East Championship	MP Motorsport	15	0	0	0	0	5	20th
2024	Eurocup-3	MP Motorsport	16	0	1	1	4	142	5th
2025	Eurocup-3 Spanish Winter Championship	MP Motorsport	8	0	0	0	2	54	6th
2025	Eurocup-3	MP Motorsport	18	0	1	0	1	65	11th
2026	FIA Formula 2 Championship	AIX Racing	22	0	0	0	1	28	17th*

^{†} As Fittipaldi was a guest driver, he was ineligible to score points.
^{*} Season still in progress.

=== Complete F4 Danish Championship results ===
(key) (Races in bold indicate pole position) (Races in italics indicate fastest lap)

Year	Team	1	2	3	4	5	6	7	8	9	10	11	12	13	14	15	16	17	18	Pos	Points
2021	FSP Racing	PAD1; 1; 10†	PAD1; 2; 4	PAD1; 3; 3	**PAD2**; **1**; 9†	PAD2; 2; 5	PAD2; 3; 2	JYL1; 1; 4	JYL1; 2; 1	JYL1; 3; 3	PAD3; 1; 5	PAD3; 2; 1	PAD3; 3; 2	DJU; 1; 4	DJU; 2; 2	DJU; 3; 2	JYL2; 1; 12	JYL2; 2; 5	JYL2; 3; 5	3rd	231

=== Complete Italian F4 Championship results ===
(key) (Races in bold indicate pole position) (Races in italics indicate fastest lap)

Year	Team	1	2	3	4	5	6	7	8	9	10	11	12	13	14	15	16	17	18	19	20	21	22	Pos	Points
2022	Van Amersfoort Racing	IMO; 1; 11	IMO; 2; 19	IMO; 3; 17	MIS; 1; 10	MIS; 2; 15	MIS; 3; 12	SPA; 1; 15	SPA; 2; 14	SPA; 3; 13	VLL; 1; 19	VLL; 2; 19	VLL; 3; 23	RBR; 1	RBR; 2; 17	RBR; 3; 14	RBR; 4; 18	MNZ; 1; 9	MNZ; 2; 14	MNZ; 3 C	MUG; 1; 11	MUG; 2; 10	MUG; 3; 16	23rd	4

=== Complete Formula Regional European Championship results ===
(key) (Races in bold indicate pole position) (Races in italics indicate fastest lap)

Year	Team	1	2	3	4	5	6	7	8	9	10	11	12	13	14	15	16	17	18	19	20	DC	Points
2023	Saintéloc Racing	IMO; 1; 19	IMO; 2; 17	CAT; 1; 19	CAT; 2; 26	HUN; 1; 30	HUN; 2 Ret	SPA; 1; 26	SPA; 2; 28	MUG; 1; 22	MUG; 2; 14	LEC; 1; 22	LEC; 2; 21	RBR; 1; 30	RBR; 2; 19	MNZ; 1; 8	MNZ; 2; 21	ZAN; 1; 23	ZAN; 2 Ret	HOC; 1; 25	HOC; 2; 24	24th	4

=== Complete Eurocup-3 results ===
(key) (Races in bold indicate pole position) (Races in italics indicate fastest lap)

Year	Team	1	2	3	4	5	6	7	8	9	10	11	12	13	14	15	16	17	18	Pos	Points
2023	GRS Team	SPA; 1	SPA; 2	ARA; 1	ARA; 2	MNZ; 1	MNZ; 2	ZAN; 1	ZAN; 2	JER; 1	JER; 2	EST; 1; 14	EST; 2; 11	CRT; 1	CRT; 2					19th	1
2023	Palou Motorsport															CAT; 1; 10	CAT; 2 Ret			19th	1
2024	MP Motorsport	SPA; 1; 4	SPA; 2 C	RBR; 1; 3	RBR; 2; 5	POR; 1; 20†	POR; 2; 6	POR; 3; 16	LEC; 1; 8	LEC; 2; 6	ZAN; 1; 8	ZAN; 2; 17	ARA; 1; 14	ARA; 2; 2	JER; 1; 4	JER; 2; 4	**CAT**; **1**; 2	CAT; 2; 2		5th	142
2025	MP Motorsport	RBR; 1; 15	RBR; 2; 12	POR; 1; 13	POR; SR; 10	POR; 2; 9	LEC; 1; 19	LEC; SR; 3	LEC; 2; 8	MNZ; 1; 7	MNZ; 2; 11	ASS; 1; 8	ASS; 2; 10	SPA; 1; 23	**SPA**; **2**; 10	JER; 1; 6	JER; 2; 4	CAT; 1; 4	CAT; 2; 8	11th	65

=== Complete Formula Regional Middle East Championship results ===
(key) (Races in bold indicate pole position) (Races in italics indicate fastest lap)

Year	Entrant	1	2	3	4	5	6	7	8	9	10	11	12	13	14	15	DC	Points
2024	MP Motorsport	YMC1; 1; 20	YMC1; 2; 18	YMC; 3 DSQ	YMC2; 1; 26	YMC2; 2 Ret	YMC2; 3; 12	DUB1; 1; 21	DUB1; 2; 22	DUB1; 3; 13	YMC3; 1; 17	YMC3; 2; 11	YMC3; 3; 15	DUB2; 1; 10	DUB2; 2; 8	DUB2; 3; 19	20th	5

=== Complete Eurocup-3 Spanish Winter Championship results ===
(key) (Races in bold indicate pole position) (Races in italics indicate fastest lap)

Year	Team	1	2	3	4	5	6	7	8	Pos	Points
2025	MP Motorsport	JER; 1; 8	JER; 2; 3	JER; 3; 6	POR; 1; 8	POR; 2; 9	POR; 3; 5	ARA; 1; 3	ARA; 2 Ret	6th	54

=== Complete FIA Formula 2 Championship results ===
(key) (Races in bold indicate pole position) (Races in italics indicate fastest lap)

Year	Entrant	1	2	3	4	5	6	7	8	9	10	11	12	13	14	15	16	17	18	19	20	21	22	23	24	25	26	27	28	29	DC	Points
2026	AIX Racing	MEL; SPR; 14	MEL; FEA; 15	MIA; SPR; Ret	MIA; FEA; 12	MTL; SPR; 5	MTL; FEA; Ret	MON; SPR; 17	MON; FEA; 7	CAT; SPR; 16	CAT; FEA; 19	RBR; SPR; Ret	RBR; FEA; 14	SIL; SPR; 17	SIL; FEA; 20	SPA; SPR; 14	SPA; FEA; Ret	HUN; SPR; 20	HUN; FEA; 17	MNZ; SPR; 16	MNZ; FEA; 20	MAD; SPR; 2	MAD; FEA; 5	BAK; SPR; 18	BAK; FEA1; 12	BAK; FEA2; 16	LSL; SPR	LSL; FEA	YMC; SPR	YMC; FEA	18th*	28*

* Season still in progress.
