= 2022 F4 Danish Championship =

Motor racing competition

Seasons
- ← 2021 2023 →

The 2022 F4 Danish Championship season was the sixth season of the F4 Danish Championship. The season began at Padborg Park in May and concluded at Jyllandsringen in October.

== Teams and drivers ==
All teams were Danish-registered.

Formula 4 entries
Team	No.	Driver	Class	Rounds
Mads Riis Racing	7	(Denmark) Mads Riis		1
GP Racing	7	(Denmark) Mikkel Gaarde Pedersen	R	6
SD Racing	11	(Denmark) Frederik Stenå		1–3
MP Racing	12	(Denmark) Magnus Pedersen	R	All
STEP Motorsport	14	(Belgium) Aurelia Nobels		3
STEP Motorsport	17	(Denmark) Julius Dinesen	R	All
STEP Motorsport	50	(Denmark) Victor Nielsen	R	All
Henriksen Racing	15	(Denmark) Michella Rasmussen		All
Henriksen Racing	16	(Denmark) Peter Henriksen		1–5
FSP Racing	22	(Denmark) William Wulf		2
FSP Racing	29	(South Africa) Mika Abrahams	R	2–6
FSP Racing	99	(Republic of Ireland) Alyx Coby	R	1–3
Team Formula Sport	33	(Denmark) Theodor Jensen	R	All
Team Formula Sport	35	(Denmark) Sebastian Gravlund		1, 3–6
Mads Hoe Motorsport	47	(Denmark) Mads Hoe		6
Formula 5 entries
Mads Hoe Motorsport	27	(Germany) Oliver Kratsch		4–6
Mads Hoe Motorsport	47	(Denmark) Mads Hoe		2–4
Mads Hoe Motorsport	56	(Denmark) Mille Hoe		All
Sønderskov Motorsport	39	(Denmark) Line Sønderskov		1, 3
Rytteriet	49	(Denmark) Niels Einar Rytter		1, 4

Icon	Class
R	Rookie

== Calendar ==
All rounds, with the exception of the competition at Sturup Raceway in Sweden, were held in Denmark.

Rnd.		Circuit/Location	Date	Supporting
1	R1	(Denmark) Padborg Park, Padborg	7–8 May	Super GT Denmark; TCR Denmark
1	R2	(Denmark) Padborg Park, Padborg	7–8 May	Super GT Denmark; TCR Denmark
1	R3	(Denmark) Padborg Park, Padborg	7–8 May	Super GT Denmark; TCR Denmark
2	R1	(Sweden) Sturup Raceway, Svedala	11–12 June	
2	R2	(Sweden) Sturup Raceway, Svedala	11–12 June	
2	R3	(Sweden) Sturup Raceway, Svedala	11–12 June	
3	R1	(Denmark) Jyllandsringen, Silkeborg	25–26 June	Super GT Denmark; TCR Denmark
3	R2	(Denmark) Jyllandsringen, Silkeborg	25–26 June	Super GT Denmark; TCR Denmark
3	R3	(Denmark) Jyllandsringen, Silkeborg	25–26 June	Super GT Denmark; TCR Denmark
4	R1	(Denmark) Ring Djursland, Pederstrup	13–14 August	
4	R2	(Denmark) Ring Djursland, Pederstrup	13–14 August	
4	R3	(Denmark) Ring Djursland, Pederstrup	13–14 August	
4	R4	(Denmark) Ring Djursland, Pederstrup	13–14 August	
5	R1	(Denmark) Padborg Park, Padborg	9–10 September	Super GT Denmark; TCR Denmark
5	R2	(Denmark) Padborg Park, Padborg	9–10 September	Super GT Denmark; TCR Denmark
5	R3	(Denmark) Padborg Park, Padborg	9–10 September	Super GT Denmark; TCR Denmark
6	R1	(Denmark) Jyllandsringen, Silkeborg	8–9 October	TCR Denmark
6	R2	(Denmark) Jyllandsringen, Silkeborg	8–9 October	TCR Denmark
6	R3	(Denmark) Jyllandsringen, Silkeborg	8–9 October	TCR Denmark

== Race results ==
Rnd.		Circuit	Overall			Formula 5
Rnd.		Circuit	Pole position	Fastest lap	Winning driver	Winning driver
1	R1	(Denmark) Padborg Park	(Denmark) Julius Dinesen	(Denmark) Sebastian Gravlund	(Denmark) Sebastian Gravlund	(Denmark) Mille Hoe
1	R2	(Denmark) Padborg Park		(Denmark) Julius Dinesen	(Denmark) Sebastian Gravlund	(Denmark) Mille Hoe
1	R3	(Denmark) Padborg Park		(Denmark) Sebastian Gravlund	(Denmark) Sebastian Gravlund	(Denmark) Mille Hoe
2	R1	(Sweden) Sturup Raceway	(Denmark) Julius Dinesen	(Denmark) Julius Dinesen	(Denmark) Julius Dinesen	(Denmark) Mille Hoe
2	R2	(Sweden) Sturup Raceway		(Denmark) Mads Hoe	(Denmark) William Wulf	(Denmark) Mads Hoe
2	R3	(Sweden) Sturup Raceway		(South Africa) Mika Abrahams	(South Africa) Mika Abrahams	(Denmark) Mads Hoe
3	R1	(Denmark) Jyllandsringen	(Denmark) Victor Nielsen	(Denmark) Victor Nielsen	(Denmark) Julius Dinesen	(Denmark) Mads Hoe
3	R2	(Denmark) Jyllandsringen		(South Africa) Mika Abrahams	(South Africa) Mika Abrahams	(Denmark) Mads Hoe
3	R3	(Denmark) Jyllandsringen		(Denmark) Victor Nielsen	(Denmark) Julius Dinesen	(Denmark) Mads Hoe
4	R1	(Denmark) Ring Djursland	(Denmark) Mads Hoe	(Denmark) Mads Hoe	(Denmark) Mads Hoe	(Denmark) Mads Hoe
4	R2	(Denmark) Ring Djursland		(Denmark) Victor Nielsen	(Denmark) Mads Hoe	(Denmark) Mads Hoe
4	R3	(Denmark) Ring Djursland		(Denmark) Sebastian Gravlund	(Denmark) Sebastian Gravlund	(Denmark) Mille Hoe
4	R4	(Denmark) Ring Djursland		(Denmark) Mads Hoe	(Denmark) Mads Hoe	(Denmark) Mads Hoe
5	R1	(Denmark) Padborg Park	(Denmark) Sebastian Gravlund	(Denmark) Julius Dinesen	(Denmark) Julius Dinesen	(Germany) Oliver Kratsch
5	R2	(Denmark) Padborg Park		(Denmark) Julius Dinesen	(Denmark) Theodor Jensen	(Germany) Oliver Kratsch
5	R3	(Denmark) Padborg Park		(Denmark) Sebastian Gravlund	(Denmark) Sebastian Gravlund	(Denmark) Mille Hoe
6	R1	(Denmark) Jyllandsringen	(Denmark) Sebastian Gravlund	(Denmark) Mads Hoe	(Denmark) Mads Hoe	(Denmark) Mille Hoe
6	R2	(Denmark) Jyllandsringen		(Denmark) Mads Hoe	(Denmark) Mads Hoe	(Denmark) Mille Hoe
6	R3	(Denmark) Jyllandsringen		(Denmark) Mads Hoe	(Denmark) Mads Hoe	(Germany) Oliver Kratsch

== Championship standings ==
Points were awarded to the top 10 classified finishers in each race. No points were awarded for pole position or fastest lap.

Position	**1st**	**2nd**	**3rd**	**4th**	**5th**	**6th**	**7th**	**8th**	**9th**	**10th**
Points	25	18	15	12	10	8	6	4	2	1

=== Drivers' standings ===
Pos	Driver	PAD1 (Denmark)			STU (Sweden)			JYL1 (Denmark)			DJU (Denmark)				PAD2 (Denmark)			JYL2 (Denmark)			Pts
Pos	Driver	R1	R2	R3	R1	R2	R3	R1	R2	R3	R1	R2	R3	R4	R1	R2	R3	R1	R2	R3	Pts
1	(Denmark) Julius Dinesen **(R)**	**2**	3	2	**1**	Ret	3	1	3	1	DSQ	5	3	4	1	4	3	3	7	4	278
2	(Denmark) Sebastian Gravlund	1	1	1				5	2	2	DSQ	4	1	2	**2**	7	1	**2**	3	3	273
3	(Denmark) Mads Hoe **(F5)**				Ret	5	4	4	4	4	**1**	1	DSQ	1				1	1	1	208
4	(South Africa) Mika Abrahams **(R)**				2	3	1	2	1	5	DSQ	3	2	3	4	3	Ret	5	6	Ret	204
5	(Denmark) Victor Nielsen **(R)**	3	6	3	6	7	7	**3**	5	6	DSQ	2	4	5	6	2	4	7	2	7	199
6	(Denmark) Magnus Pedersen **(R)**	4	2	4	4	4	2	6	6	3	DSQ	7	Ret	6	3	5	7	6	4	2	198
7	(Denmark) Theodor Jensen **(R)**	6	4	12	3	6	5	DSQ	7	8	DSQ	6	5	7	5	1	2	8	5	6	162
8	(Denmark) Frederik Stenå	8	5	5	7	2	8	7	9	9											62
9	(Denmark) Peter Henriksen	10	7	8	Ret	8	12†	11	10	10	Ret	9	7	8	8	6	5				51
10	(Denmark) Mille Hoe **(F5)**	9	8	9	8	9	10	9	11	12	Ret	8	6	9	9	9	6	9	8	Ret	49
11	(Germany) Oliver Kratsch **(F5)**										3	DSQ	8	10	7	8	9	10	9	8	39
12	(Denmark) William Wulf				10†	1	6														34
13	(Republic of Ireland) Alyx Coby **(R)**	7	Ret	7	5	Ret	9	13†	8	11											28
14	(Denmark) Michella Rasmussen	13	11	DNS	9	10	11	12	12	13	4	11	10	12	10†	10	8	11	10	9	25
15	(Denmark) Niels Einar Rytter **(F5)**	11	10	10							2	10	9	11							23
16	(Denmark) Mikkel Gaarde Pedersen																	4	Ret	5	22
17	(Denmark) Mads Riis	5	Ret	6																	18
18	(Belgium) Aurelia Nobels							8	Ret	7											10
19	(Denmark) Line Sønderskov **(F5)**	12	9	11				10	DNS	DNS											3
Pos	Driver	R1	R2	R3	R1	R2	R3	R1	R2	R3	R1	R2	R3	R4	R1	R2	R3	R1	R2	R3	Pts
Pos	Driver	PAD1 (Denmark)			STU (Sweden)			JYL1 (Denmark)			DJU (Denmark)				PAD2 (Denmark)			JYL2 (Denmark)			Pts

Colour	Result
Gold	Winner
Silver	Second place
Bronze	Third place
Green	Points classification
Blue	Non-points classification
Blue	Non-classified finish (NC)
Purple	Retired, not classified (Ret)
Red	Did not qualify (DNQ)
Red	Did not pre-qualify (DNPQ)
Black	Disqualified (DSQ)
White	Did not start (DNS)
White	Withdrew (WD)
White	Race cancelled (C)
Blank	Did not practice (DNP)
Blank	Did not arrive (DNA)
Blank	Excluded (EX)

**Bold** – Pole
Italics – Fastest Lap

- † – Driver did not finish the race, but was classified as they completed over 75% of the race distance.
