= 2026 Baku Formula 2 round =

Motor racing event in Baku, Azerbaijan

(Azerbaijan) 2026 Baku Formula 2 round
Round details
- Round 12 of 14 in the 2026 FIA Formula 2 Championship.
- Location: Baku City Circuit; Baku, Azerbaijan
- Course: Street circuit 6.003 km (3.730 mi)

Sprint Race
- Date: 25 September 2026
- Laps: 21
Podium
First	(Sweden) Dino Beganovic	DAMS Lucas Oil
Second	(Netherlands) Laurens van Hoepen	Trident
Third	(Republic of Ireland) Alex Dunne	Rodin Motorsport
Fastest lap
Driver	(Brazil) Rafael Câmara	Invicta Racing
- Time: 1:56.855 (on lap 10)

Feature Race 1
- Date: 25 September 2026
- Laps: 23
Pole position
Driver	(Republic of Ireland) Alex Dunne	Rodin Motorsport
Time	1:55.383	
Podium
First	(Republic of Ireland) Alex Dunne	Rodin Motorsport
Second	(Norway) Martinius Stenshorne	Rodin Motorsport
Third	(Sweden) Dino Beganovic	DAMS Lucas Oil
Fastest lap
Driver	(Republic of Ireland) Alex Dunne	Rodin Motorsport
- Time: 1:55.737 (on lap 23)

Feature Race 2
- Date: 26 September 2026
- Laps: 29
Pole position
Driver	(Norway) Martinius Stenshorne	Rodin Motorsport
Time	1:53.728	
Podium
First	(Brazil) Rafael Câmara	Invicta Racing
Second	(Bulgaria) Nikola Tsolov	Campos Racing
Third	(Republic of Ireland) Alex Dunne	Rodin Motorsport
Fastest lap
Driver	(Colombia) Sebastián Montoya	Prema Racing
- Time: 1:55.494 (on lap 29)

The 2026 Baku FIA Formula 2 round was a motor racing event held between 24 and 26 September 2026 at the Baku City Circuit. It was the twelfth round of the 2026 FIA Formula 2 Championship and was held in support of the 2026 Azerbaijan Grand Prix. As the only support event for the Azerbaijan Grand Prix, the round featured an extra additional qualifying session and an additional feature race.

== Classification ==
=== Qualifying ===
==== Qualifying 1 ====
Qualifying 1 was held on 24 September 2026 at 14:15 local time (UTC+4).

Pos.	No.	Driver	Entrant	Time/Gap	Grid SR	Grid FR1
1	15	(Republic of Ireland) Alex Dunne	Rodin Motorsport	1:55.383	10	1
2	14	(Norway) Martinius Stenshorne	Rodin Motorsport	+0.033	9	2
3	5	(Mexico) Noel León	Campos Racing	+0.134	8	3
4	16	(India) Kush Maini	ART Grand Prix	+0.230	7	4
5	1	(Brazil) Rafael Câmara	Invicta Racing	+0.238	6	5
6	12	(Spain) Mari Boya	Prema Racing	+0.360	5	6
7	11	(Colombia) Sebastián Montoya	Prema Racing	+0.455	4	7
8	7	(Sweden) Dino Beganovic	DAMS Lucas Oil	+0.455	3	8
9	24	(Netherlands) Laurens van Hoepen	Trident	+0.551	2	9
10	6	(Bulgaria) Nikola Tsolov	Campos Racing	+0.574	1	10
11	3	(Japan) Ritomo Miyata	Hitech	+0.646	11	11
12	17	(Thailand) Tasanapol Inthraphuvasak	ART Grand Prix	+0.856	12	12
13	8	(Poland) Roman Bilinski	DAMS Lucas Oil	+1.007	13	13
14	9	(Italy) Gabriele Minì	MP Motorsport	+1.491	14	14
15	25	(United Kingdom) John Bennett	Trident	+1.549	15	15
16	2	(Paraguay) Joshua Dürksen	Invicta Racing	+1.762	16	19^{1}
17	23	(Mexico) Rafael Villagómez	Van Amersfoort Racing	+1.844	17	16
18	22	(Japan) Hiyu Yamakoshi	Van Amersfoort Racing	+2.224	18	17
19	10	(Germany) Oliver Goethe	MP Motorsport	+2.253	19	18
20	20	(Brazil) Emerson Fittipaldi Jr.	AIX Racing	+2.410	20	20
21	4	(United States) Colton Herta	Hitech	+2.484	21	21
22	21	(United Kingdom) Cian Shields	AIX Racing	+2.648	22	22

Notes:

- ^1 – Joshua Dürksen received a five-second time penalty in the sprint race for causing a collision with John Bennett. However, due to Dürksen not being classified, the time penalty was converted into a three-place grid penalty for the first feature race, dropping him from 16th to 19th on the grid.

==== Qualifying 2 ====
Qualifying 2 was held on 24 September 2026 at 14:30 local time (UTC+4).

Pos.	No.	Driver	Entrant	Time/Gap	Grid FR2
1	14	(Norway) Martinius Stenshorne	Rodin Motorsport	1:53.728	1
2	15	(Republic of Ireland) Alex Dunne	Rodin Motorsport	+0.445	2
3	1	(Brazil) Rafael Câmara	Invicta Racing	+0.499	3
4	12	(Spain) Mari Boya	Prema Racing	+0.637	4
5	16	(India) Kush Maini	ART Grand Prix	+0.690	5
6	5	(Mexico) Noel León	Campos Racing	+0.749	6
7	24	(Netherlands) Laurens van Hoepen	Trident	+0.767	7
8	6	(Bulgaria) Nikola Tsolov	Campos Racing	+0.957	11^{1}
9	17	(Thailand) Tasanapol Inthraphuvasak	ART Grand Prix	+1.243	8
10	11	(Colombia) Sebastián Montoya	Prema Racing	+1.313	9
11	3	(Japan) Ritomo Miyata	Hitech	+1.391	10
12	7	(Sweden) Dino Beganovic	DAMS Lucas Oil	+1.400	12
13	2	(Paraguay) Joshua Dürksen	Invicta Racing	+1.555	13
14	23	(Mexico) Rafael Villagómez	Van Amersfoort Racing	+1.577	14
15	10	(Germany) Oliver Goethe	MP Motorsport	+1.589	15
16	9	(Italy) Gabriele Minì	MP Motorsport	+1.715	16
17	25	(United Kingdom) John Bennett	Trident	+1.807	17
18	8	(Poland) Roman Bilinski	DAMS Lucas Oil	+1.839	18
19	22	(Japan) Hiyu Yamakoshi	Van Amersfoort Racing	+2.359	19
20	20	(Brazil) Emerson Fittipaldi Jr.	AIX Racing	+2.371	20
21	4	(United States) Colton Herta	Hitech	+3.091	22^{2}
22	21	(United Kingdom) Cian Shields	AIX Racing	+3.244	21

Notes:

- ^1 – Nikola Tsolov received a five-second time penalty in the first feature for crossing the pit entry line. However, due to Tsolov not being classified, the time penalty was converted into a three-place grid penalty for the second feature race, dropping him from 8th to 11th on the grid.
- ^2 – Colton Herta received a three-place grid penalty for impeding Cian Shields. The penalty dropped Herta from 21st to 22nd on the grid.

=== Sprint race ===
The sprint race was held on 25 September 2026 at 08:15 local time (UTC+4).

Pos.	No.	Driver	Entrant	Laps	Time/Retired	Grid	Points
1	7	(Sweden) Dino Beganovic	DAMS Lucas Oil	21	45:48.207	3	10
2	24	(Netherlands) Laurens van Hoepen	Trident	21	+1.058	2	8
3	15	(Republic of Ireland) Alex Dunne	Rodin Motorsport	21	+1.476	10	6+1
4	14	(Norway) Martinius Stenshorne	Rodin Motorsport	21	+1.920	9	5
5	6	(Bulgaria) Nikola Tsolov	Campos Racing	21	+3.341	1	4
6	8	(Poland) Roman Bilinski	DAMS Lucas Oil	21	+4.006	13	3
7	11	(Colombia) Sebastián Montoya	Prema Racing	21	+4.160	4	2
8	16	(India) Kush Maini	ART Grand Prix	21	+5.698	7	1
9	4	(United States) Colton Herta	Hitech	21	+6.555	21	
10	25	(United Kingdom) John Bennett	Trident	21	+8.327	15	
11	17	(Thailand) Tasanapol Inthraphuvasak	ART Grand Prix	21	+8.359	12	
12	21	(United Kingdom) Cian Shields	AIX Racing	21	+9.297	22	
13	23	(Mexico) Rafael Villagómez	Van Amersfoort Racing	21	+13.151	17	
14	9	(Italy) Gabriele Minì	MP Motorsport	21	+18.600	14	
15	1	(Brazil) Rafael Câmara	Invicta Racing	21	+26.204	6	
16	10	(Germany) Oliver Goethe	MP Motorsport	21	+34.774^{1}	19	
17	22	(Japan) Hiyu Yamakoshi	Van Amersfoort Racing	21	+47.348	18	
18	20	(Brazil) Emerson Fittipaldi Jr.	AIX Racing	21	+52.610	20	
19	3	(Japan) Ritomo Miyata	Hitech	20	DNF	11	
20	5	(Mexico) Noel León	Campos Racing	20	DNF	8	
DNF	2	(Paraguay) Joshua Dürksen	Invicta Racing	17	Accident	16	
DNF	12	(Spain) Mari Boya	Prema Racing	0	Collision	5	
Fastest lap: (Brazil) Rafael Câmara (1:56.855 on lap 10)^{2}

- ^1 – Oliver Goethe received a ten-second time penalty for causing a collison with Gabriele Minì and Ritomo Miyata. The penalty dropped Goethe from 15th to 16th in the final classification.
- ^2 – Rafael Câmara set the fastest lap but did not finish in the top ten, so was ineligible to score the point for it. Alex Dunne scored the point for setting the fastest lap among those finishing in the top ten.

=== Feature race 1 ===
The first feature race was held on 25 September 2026 at 14:15 local time (UTC+4).

Pos.	No.	Driver	Entrant	Laps	Time/Retired	Grid	Points
1	15	(Republic of Ireland) Alex Dunne	Rodin Motorsport	23	1:11:45.095	1	25+2
2	14	(Norway) Martinius Stenshorne	Rodin Motorsport	23	+4.395	2	18
3	7	(Sweden) Dino Beganovic	DAMS Lucas Oil	23	+6.614	8	15
4	1	(Brazil) Rafael Câmara	Invicta Racing	23	+7.669	5	12
5	5	(Mexico) Noel León	Campos Racing	23	+7.719	3	10
6	9	(Italy) Gabriele Minì	MP Motorsport	23	+10.874	14	8
7	8	(Poland) Roman Bilinski	DAMS Lucas Oil	23	+11.151	13	6
8	23	(Mexico) Rafael Villagómez	Van Amersfoort Racing	23	+15.376	16	4
9	22	(Japan) Hiyu Yamakoshi	Van Amersfoort Racing	23	+16.509	17	2
10	16	(India) Kush Maini	ART Grand Prix	23	+19.176^{1}	4	1
11	17	(Thailand) Tasanapol Inthraphuvasak	ART Grand Prix	23	+20.759	12	
12	20	(Brazil) Emerson Fittipaldi Jr.	AIX Racing	23	+24.121	20	
13	4	(United States) Colton Herta	Hitech	23	+59.572	21	
14	10	(Germany) Oliver Goethe	MP Motorsport	23	+1:01.765	18	
DNF	21	(United Kingdom) Cian Shields	AIX Racing	11	Collision	22	
DNF	25	(United Kingdom) John Bennett	Trident	11	Collision	15	
DNF	24	(Netherlands) Laurens van Hoepen	Trident	11	Collision	9	
DNF	3	(Japan) Ritomo Miyata	Hitech	11	Collision	11	
DNF	2	(Paraguay) Joshua Dürksen	Invicta Racing	11	Collision	19	
DNF	6	(Bulgaria) Nikola Tsolov	Campos Racing	11	Collision	10	
DNF	12	(Spain) Mari Boya	Prema Racing	7	Retired	6	
DNS	11	(Colombia) Sebastián Montoya	Prema Racing	0		7	
Fastest lap: (Republic of Ireland) Alex Dunne (1:55.737 on lap 23)

Notes:

- ^1 – Kush Maini received a five-second time penalty for speeding in the pit lane.

=== Feature race 2 ===
The second feature race was held on 26 September 2026 at 11:00 local time (UTC+4).

Pos.	No.	Driver	Entrant	Laps	Time/Retired	Grid	Points
1	1	(Brazil) Rafael Câmara	Invicta Racing	29	59:57.958	3	25
2	6	(Bulgaria) Nikola Tsolov	Campos Racing	29	+0.747	11	18+1
3	15	(Republic of Ireland) Alex Dunne	Rodin Motorsport	29	+4.310^{1}	2	15
4	14	(Norway) Martinius Stenshorne	Rodin Motorsport	29	+5.856	1	12
5	24	(Netherlands) Laurens van Hoepen	Trident	29	+13.521	7	10
6	12	(Spain) Mari Boya	Prema Racing	29	+13.890	4	8
7	7	(Sweden) Dino Beganovic	DAMS Lucas Oil	29	+15.552	12	6
8	5	(Mexico) Noel León	Campos Racing	29	+17.285	6	4
9	9	(Italy) Gabriele Minì	MP Motorsport	29	+24.073	16	2
10	8	(Poland) Roman Bilinski	DAMS Lucas Oil	29	+24.415	18	1
11	10	(Germany) Oliver Goethe	MP Motorsport	29	+24.637	15	
12	16	(India) Kush Maini	ART Grand Prix	29	+37.489	5	
13	2	(Paraguay) Joshua Dürksen	Invicta Racing	29	+39.080	13	
14	22	(Japan) Hiyu Yamakoshi	Van Amersfoort Racing	29	+42.145	19	
15	4	(United States) Colton Herta	Hitech	29	+44.048	22	
16	20	(Brazil) Emerson Fittipaldi Jr.	AIX Racing	29	+44.973	20	
17	11	(Colombia) Sebastián Montoya	Prema Racing	29	+1:17.168	9	
18	21	(United Kingdom) Cian Shields	AIX Racing	29	+1:45.633	21	
DNF	23	(Mexico) Rafael Villagómez	Van Amersfoort Racing	16		14	
DNF	17	(Thailand) Tasanapol Inthraphuvasak	ART Grand Prix	8	Accident	8	
DNF	3	(Japan) Ritomo Miyata	Hitech	5		10	
DNF	25	(United Kingdom) John Bennett	Trident	0	Collision	17	
Fastest lap: (Colombia) Sebastián Montoya (1:55.494 on lap 29)^{2}

Notes:

- ^1 – Alex Dunne received a five-second time penalty for crossing the pit entry line.
- ^2 – Sebastián Montoya set the fastest lap but did not finish in the top ten, so was ineligible to score the point for it. Nikola Tsolov scored the point for setting the fastest lap among those finishing in the top ten.

== Standings after the event ==
Drivers' Championship standings

	Pos.	Driver	Points
1	1	(Brazil) Rafael Câmara	207
1	2	(Bulgaria) Nikola Tsolov	200
1	3	(Republic of Ireland) Alex Dunne	189
1	4	(Italy) Gabriele Minì	163
1	5	(Sweden) Dino Beganovic	137

Teams' Championship standings

	Pos.	Team	Points
	1	(Spain) Campos Racing	333
	2	(United Kingdom) Invicta Racing	297
	3	(New Zealand) Rodin Motorsport	296
	4	(Netherlands) MP Motorsport	200
1	5	(France) DAMS Lucas Oil	173

Note: Only the top five positions are included for both sets of standings.

== See also ==
- 2026 Azerbaijan Grand Prix

Previous round: 2026 Madrid Formula 2 round	FIA Formula 2 Championship; 2026 season	Next round: 2026 Lusail Formula 2 round
Previous round: 2025 Baku Formula 2 round	Baku Formula 2 round	Next round: 2027 Baku Formula 2 round
