= Jesse Carrasquedo Jr. =

Mexican racing driver (born 2007)

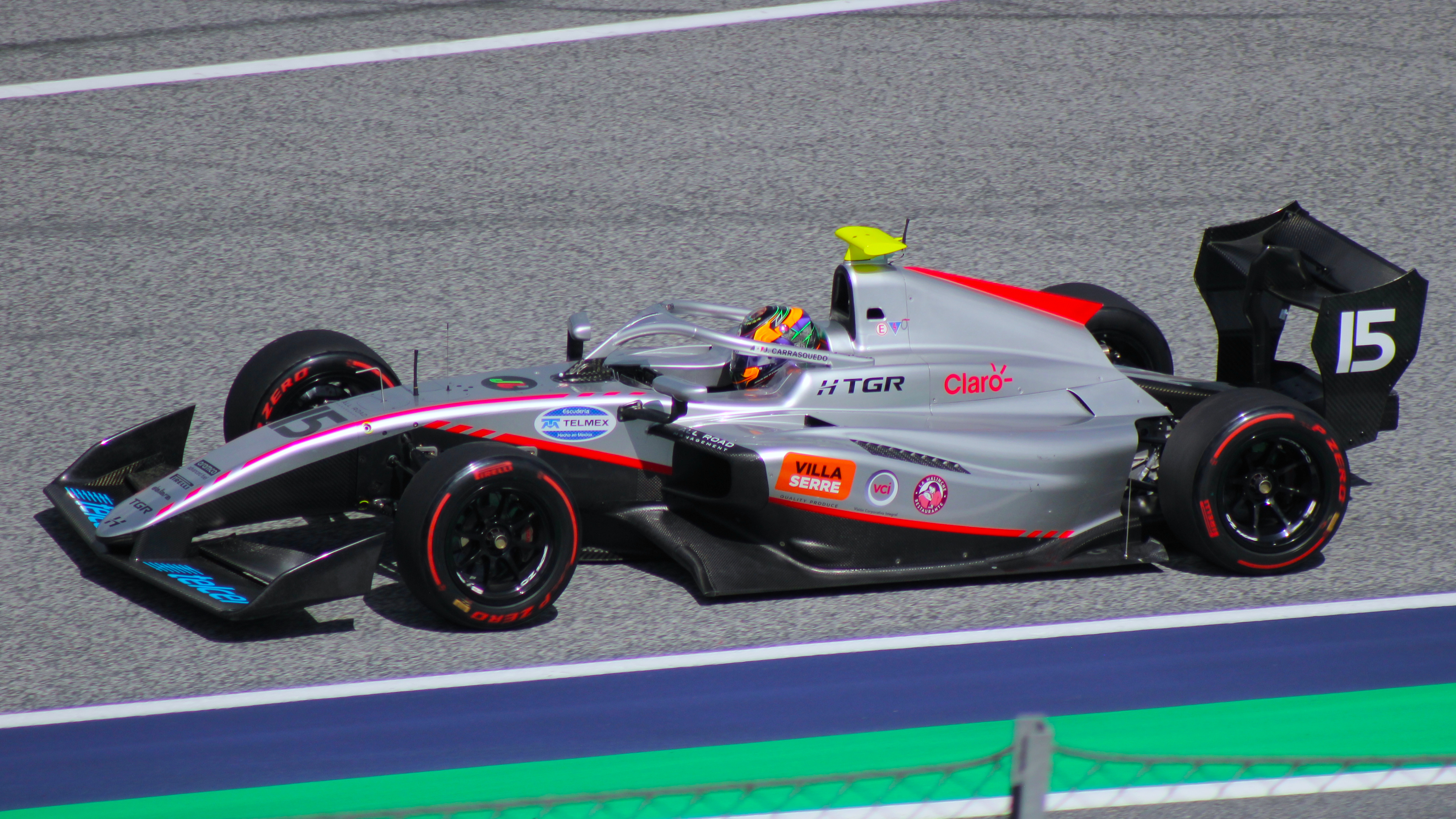
- Carrasquedo driving the Dallara F3 2025 during the 2025 Spielberg Formula 3 round
- Nationality: (Mexico) Mexican
- Born: Jesse Alejandro Carrasquedo Parada; 27 April 2007 (age 19) León, Guanajuato, Mexico

Euroformula Open Championship career
- Debut season: 2026
- Current team: Team Motopark
- Car number: 27

Previous series
- 2025; 2025; 2023–2025; 2024-2025; 2023-2024; 2023; 2022-2023; 2022; 2022-2023; 2021: FIA Formula 3 Championship; Eurocup-3 Spanish Winter Championship; Eurocup-3; FR Middle East Championship; FR European Championship; F4 UAE Championship; Italian F4 Championship; NACAM F4 Championship; F4 Spanish Championship; F4 Danish Championship

Jesse Alejandro Carrasquedo Parada (born 27 April 2007) is a Mexican racing driver who last competed in the Euroformula Open Championship for Team Motopark. He is a member of Escudería Telmex and has previously raced in Eurocup-3 for Campos Racing.

Carrasquedo has been coached throughout his career by Sergio and Antonio Pérez.

== Career ==
=== Karting ===
Carrasquedo started karting at the age of five, racing mainly in karting events around Mexico and the USA before making his debut internationally in 2016. Making his European debut a year later and under Jonathan Thonon's coaching, Carrasquedo spent six years as a driver for Parolin, during which he most notably finished fifth in the 2020 Rok Cup International Final in the Junior Rok class.

=== Formula 4 ===
After testing Formula 4 machinery for MOL Racing at Circuito de Navarra at the end of 2020, Carrasquedo made his European single-seater debut in the F4 Danish Championship for FSP Racing. Making his debut at the second round of the season at Padborg Park, Carrasquedo scored his maiden series win on debut, following Juju Noda's disqualification from race one. In the remaining two races of the round, Carrasquedo finished second to William Wulf in race two, before winning race three to cap off the weekend. Carrasquedo returned to the series for the fourth round of the season, once again at Padborg Park, but after jumping the start in race three and ignoring the black flag, he was excluded from all three races.

==== 2022 ====
Having joined the Campos Racing Academy in 2021, Carrasquedo stayed with them to race in the 2022 F4 Spanish Championship. After taking a best result of 16th in race three of the first round at Algarve, Carrasquedo sat out the next four rounds due to phagophobia, and was replaced by Charlie Wurz at Jerez and then Manuel Espírito Santo from Valencia onwards. Carrasquedo returned to racing in August of that year, competing in a one-off round in the NACAM Formula 4 Championship at Puebla, winning two out of three races and finishing second in race two. His return in the Spanish championship came in late September, replacing Filip Jenic ahead of the penultimate round of the season at Navarra. After not finishing inside the top-20 in the last two rounds of the F4 Spanish season, Carrasquedo made a one-off appearance in the Italian F4 Championship at Mugello for Monlau Motorsport.

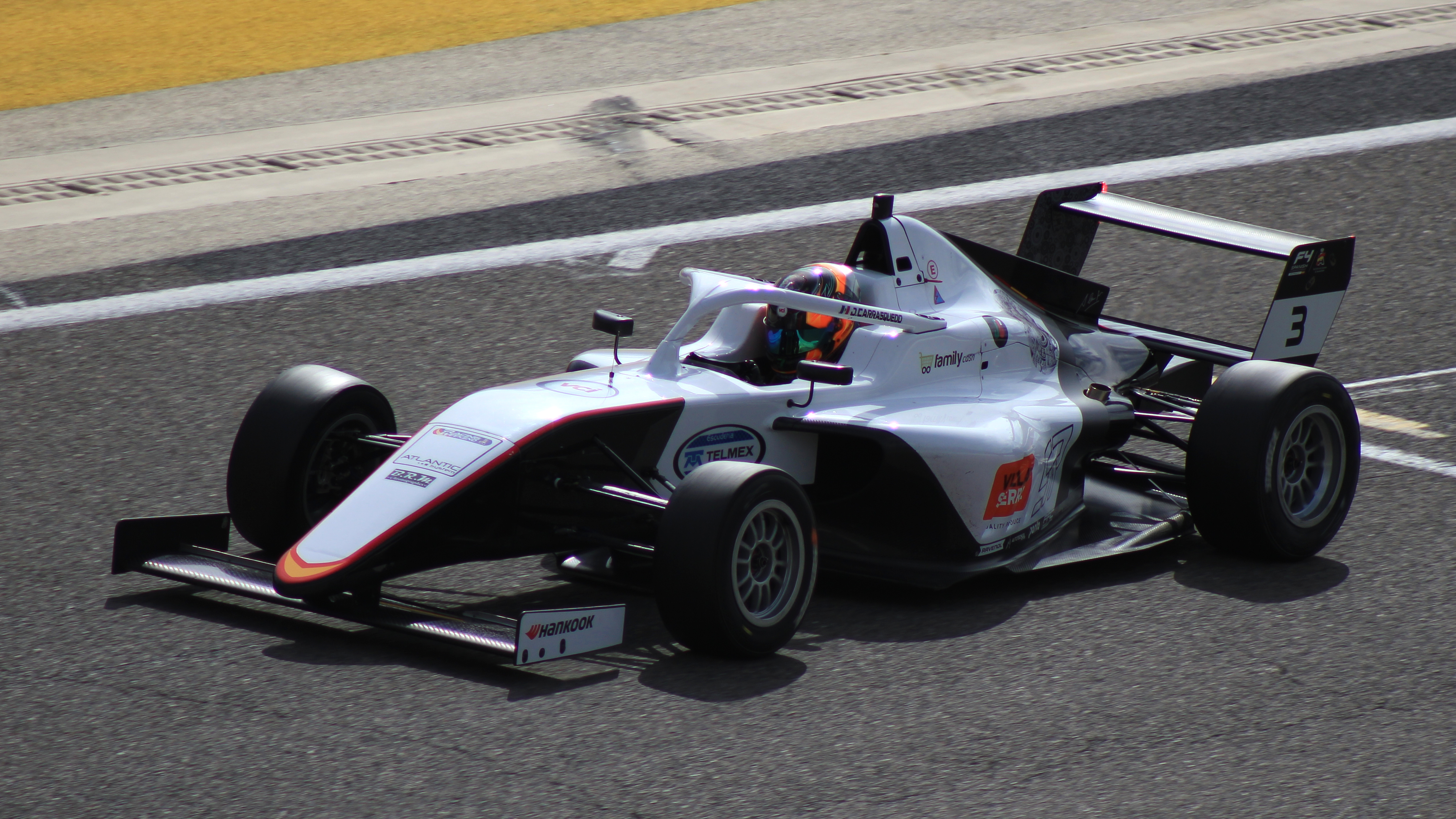
Carrasquedo at the Spa round of the 2023 F4 Spanish Championship

==== 2023 ====
Carrasquedo returned to Campos Racing for the 2023 F4 Spanish Championship, whilst also competing for R-ace GP during the winter in the Formula 4 UAE Championship. After scoring 20 points in the UAE, which included a best result of fifth in race three at Dubai, Carrasquedo competed in the F4 Spanish Championship, in which he only scored one points finish, an eighth in race one of the second round at Aragón, en route to 19th in points. During 2023, Carrasquedo also competed in the opening round of the Italian F4 Championship for BVM Racing at Imola, taking a best result of tenth in race two in just his second appearance in the series.

=== Formula Regional ===
==== 2023 ====
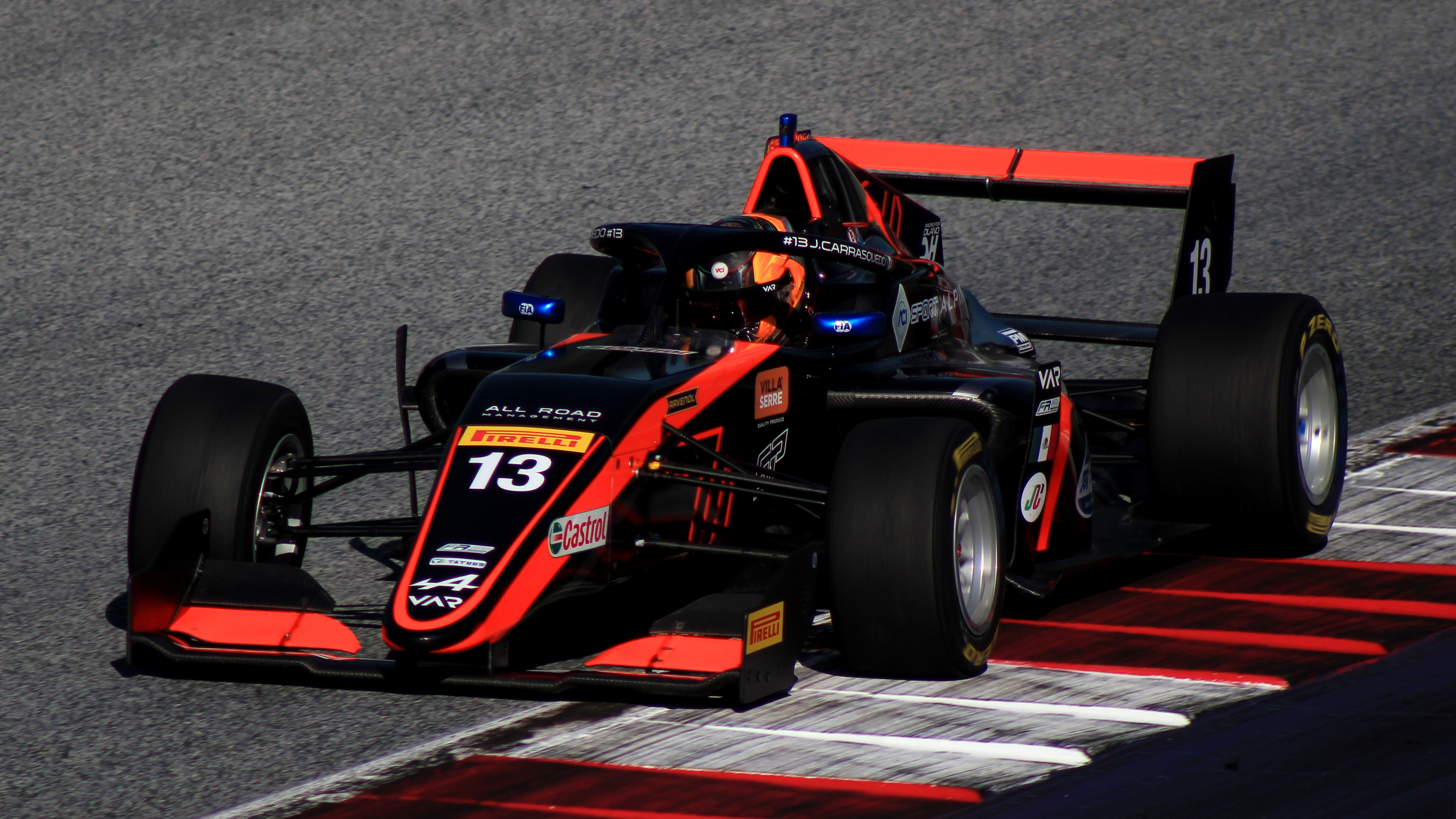
Carrasquedo at the Red Bull Ring round of the 2023 Formula Regional European Championship

During 2023, Carrasquedo made a one-off appearance in the inaugural season of Eurocup-3, driving for GRS at Zandvoort. After taking a best result of 12th in race two, Carrasquedo switched to the Formula Regional European Championship, replacing Joshua Dufek at Van Amersfoort Racing. Racing at the Red Bull Ring and Monza rounds, Carrasquedo scored a best finish of 23rd on his series debut.

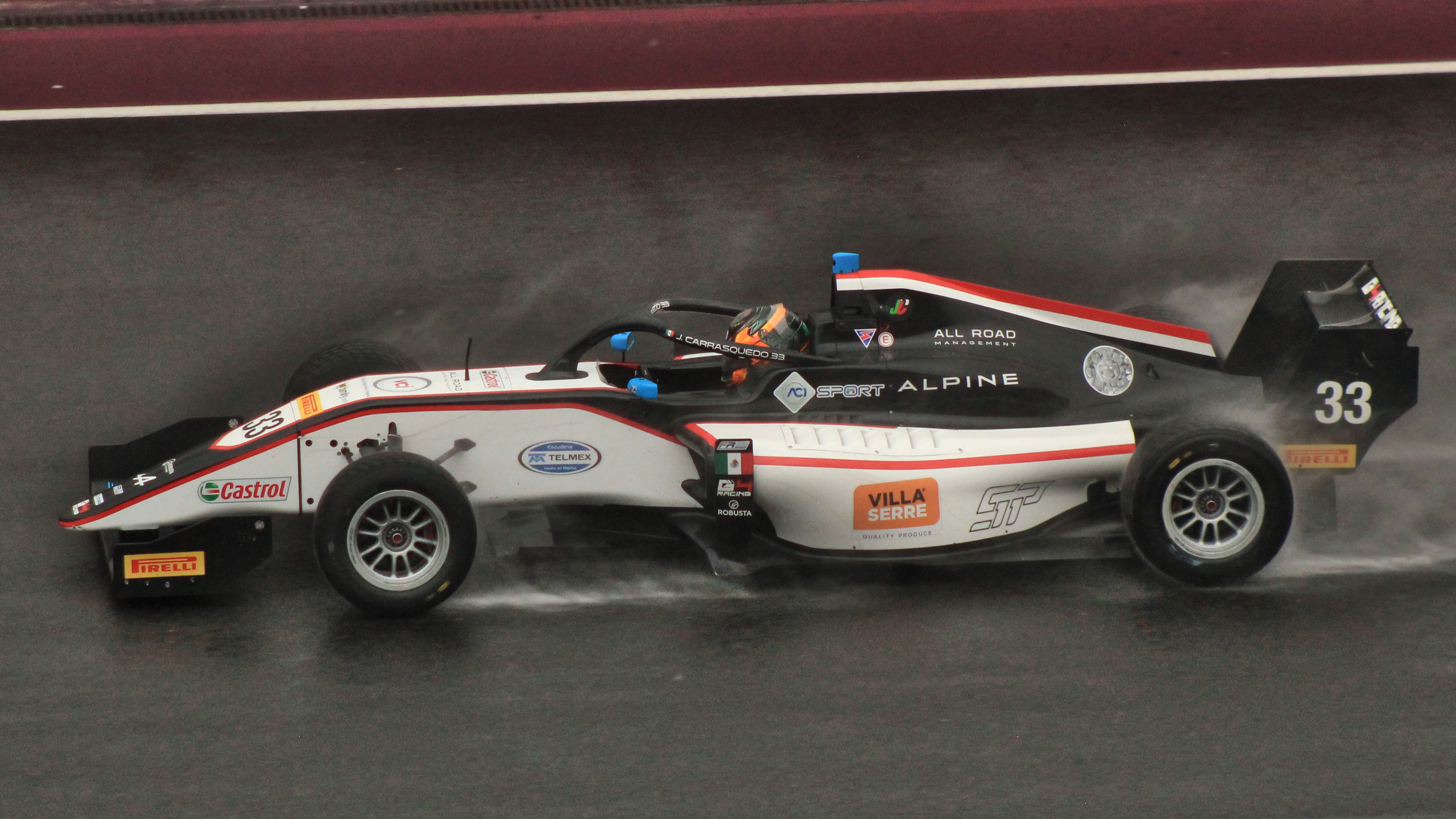
Carrasquedo at the Hungaroring round of the 2024 Formula Regional European Championship

==== 2024 ====
In 2024, Carrasquedo joined R-ace GP to race in the Formula Regional Middle East Championship over the winter, before moving to G4 Racing for the rest of the year, competing in the Formula Regional European Championship. In the Middle Eastern series, Carrasquedo was only able to score a best result of 11th in the reverse-grid race at the second Yas Marina round, on his way to 25th in points. Returning to Europe for the rest of the year, Carrasquedo left G4 Racing after four rounds and a best result of 19th in race two at the Hockenheimring, joining Campos Racing to race in Eurocup-3 for the rest of the year. Racing in the last five rounds of the season, Carrasquedo scored his maiden podium by finishing third in race two at Le Castellet, before taking his maiden series win two rounds later at Aragón.

==== 2025 ====
Carrasquedo remained with Campos Racing for 2025, competing in both the Winter and Main seasons of Eurocup-3, whilst also making select starts for Pinnacle Motorsport in the Formula Regional Middle East Championship. During the winter, Carrasquedo scored one podium in each winter series, finishing third in race three in the season-opening Yas Marina in the Middle East, before finishing second in the penultimate race of the Eurocup-3 Winter Series at Aragón. In his only full-time season in the main series, Carrasquedo won at Algarve and Spa and scored two more podiums to end the year fifth in the overall standings.

==== 2026 ====
In early 2026, Carrasquedo joined MP Motorsport to compete in the final two rounds of the Formula Regional Middle East Trophy, scoring a best result of 11th in race one at Lusail. Following that, Carrasquedo joined Team Motopark for the rest of the year to race in the Euroformula Open Championship. Starting off the season with a podium at Spa and two wins at Misano, Carrasquedo then won at Le Castellet and took five other podiums en route to third in overall points.

=== Formula 3 ===
==== 2025 ====
Carrasquedo partook in the 2024 FIA Formula 3 Championship post-season tests at Jerez with Van Amersfoort Racing. Six months later, on 28 May 2025, it was announced that Carrasquedo would replace Joshua Dufek at Hitech TGR ahead of the fifth round of the season at Barcelona.

==== 2026 ====
On September 23, 2025, it was announced that Carrasquedo would participate full-time in the 2026 season for Van Amersfoort Racing. However, days before the pre-season test in Barcelona, Carrasquedo left the team due to personal reasons and was replaced by Enzo Deligny.

=== Formula One ===
At the end of 2022, Carrasquedo participated in the Ferrari Scouting World Finals.

== Karting record ==
=== Karting career summary ===
Season	Series	Team	Position
2011	Leon Karting Championship – S4		15th
2012	Leon Karting Championship – S4		4th
2014	SKUSA Pro Tour – S4		48th
2015	SKUSA Pro Tour – S4		36th
2015	SKUSA SuperNationals – S4 Master	Team GP/VCI	NC
2016	SKUSA Pro Tour – Micro Swift		17th
2016	SKUSA Pro Tour – S4		24th
2016	SKUSA SuperNationals – Micro Swift	GP VCI Mexico	8th
2016	SKUSA SuperNationals – S4 Master		NC
2017	Florida Winter Tour – Micro Rok		4th
2017	SKUSA Pro Tour – S4		16th
2017	South Garda Winter Cup – Mini Rok	GP Racing Srl	NC
2017	WSK Final Cup – 60 Mini	Parolin Racing Team	83rd
2017	SKUSA SuperNationals – Mini Swift		15th
2018	WSK Champions Cup – 60 Mini	Parolin Racing Kart	NC
2018	WSK Super Master Series – 60 Mini	Parolin Racing Kart	72nd
2018	Italian Karting Championship – Junior Rok		NC
2019	WSK Champions Cup – OKJ	Parolin Racing Kart	NC
2019	WSK Super Master Series – OKJ	Parolin Racing Kart	65th
2019	WSK Euro Series – OKJ	Parolin Racing Kart	61st
2019	Karting European Championship – OKJ	Parolin Racing Kart	85th
2019	Coupe de France – OKJ	Parolin Racing Kart	NC
2019	WSK Open Cup – OKJ	Parolin Racing Kart	43rd
2020	SKUSA Winter Series – X30 Junior		NC
2020	Rok Cup International Final – Junior Rok	Parolin Poland	5th
2020	Champions of the Future – OKJ	Parolin Racing Kart	NC
2020	Karting World Championship – OKJ	Parolin Racing Kart	37th
2020	WSK Open Cup – OKJ	Parolin Racing Kart	37th
2021	WSK Champions Cup – OK	Parolin Motorsport	NC
2021	WSK Super Master Series – OK	Parolin Motorsport	61st
2021	WSK Euro Series – OK	Parolin Motorsport	50th
2021	Champions of the Future – OK	Parolin Motorsport	33rd
2021	Karting European Championship – OK	Parolin Motorsport	52nd
2021	WSK Open Cup – OK	Parolin Motorsport	21st
2021	Karting World Championship – OK	Parolin Motorsport	26th
2022	WSK Super Master Series – KZ2	Parolin Motorsport	95th

== Racing record ==
=== Racing career summary ===
Season	Series	Team	Races	Wins	Poles	F/Laps	Podiums	Points	Position
2019–20	NACAM Formula 4 Championship	Sidral AGA-Checo Pérez	9	0	0	0	0	39	13rd
2021	F4 Danish Championship	FSP Racing	3	2	0	1	2	62	11st
2022	F4 Spanish Championship	Campos	9	0	0	0	0	0	32nd
2022	NACAM Formula 4 Championship	SP Driver Academy Team	3	2	0	3	3	68	9th
2022	Italian F4 Championship	Monlau Motorsport	3	0	0	0	0	0	42nd
2023	Formula 4 UAE Championship	R-ace GP	15	0	0	1	0	20	18th
2023	Italian F4 Championship	BVM Racing	3	0	0	0	0	1	25th
2023	F4 Spanish Championship	Campos Racing	21	0	0	0	0	4	19th
2023	Eurocup-3	GRS Team	2	0	0	0	0	0	22nd
2023	Formula Regional European Championship	Van Amersfoort Racing	4	0	0	0	0	0	42nd
2024	Formula Regional Middle East Championship	R-ace GP	14	0	0	0	0	0	25th
2024	Formula Regional European Championship	G4 Racing	8	0	0	0	0	0	33rd
2024	Eurocup-3	Campos Racing	10	1	1	1	2	80	8th
2025	Formula Regional Middle East Championship	Pinnacle Motorsport	9	0	0	0	1	41	15th
2025	Eurocup-3 Spanish Winter Championship	Griffin Core by Campos	8	0	0	0	1	41	8th
2025	Eurocup-3	Griffin Core by Campos	18	2	2	3	4	152	5th
2025	FIA Formula 3 Championship	Hitech TGR	4	0	0	0	0	0	31st
2026	Formula Regional Middle East Trophy	MP Motorsport	5	0	0	0	0	0	26th
2026	Euroformula Open Championship	Team Motopark	24	3	4	5	9	291	**3rd**

* Season still in progress.

=== Complete NACAM Formula 4 Championship results ===
(key) (Races in bold indicate pole position) (Races in italics indicate fastest lap)

Year	Team	1	2	3	4	5	6	7	8	9	10	11	12	13	14	15	16	17	18	19	20	DC	Points
2019-20	Sidral AGA-Checo Pérez	AHR; 1	AHR; 2	AGS; 1	AGS; 2	AGS; 3	PUE; 1	PUE; 2	PUE; 3	MER; 1 Ret	MER; 2; 10	MER; 3; 9	QUE1; 1; 6	QUE1; 2; 4	QUE1; 3; 11	QUE2; 1; 8	QUE2; 2; 12	QUE2; 3; 4	MTY; 1	MTY; 2	MTY; 3	13th	39
2022	SP Driver Academy	QUE; 1	QUE; 2	QUE; 3	AHR1; 1	AHR1; 2	AHR1; 3	PUE; 1; 1	PUE; 2; 2	PUE; 3; 1	AHR2; 1	AHR2; 2	AHR2; 3	AHR3; 1	AHR3; 2	AHR3; 3	AHR4; 1	AHR4; 2				9th	68

=== Complete F4 Danish Championship results ===
(key) (Races in bold indicate pole position) (Races in italics indicate fastest lap)

Year	Team	1	2	3	4	5	6	7	8	9	10	11	12	13	14	15	16	17	18	Pos	Points
2021	FSP Racing	PAD1; 1	PAD1; 2	PAD1; 3	PAD2; 1; 1	PAD2; 2; 4	PAD2; 3; 1	JYL1; 1	JYL1; 2	JYL1; 3	PAD3; 1 EX	PAD3; 2 EX	PAD3; 3 DSQ	DJU; 1	DJU; 2	DJU; 3	JYL2; 1	JYL2; 2	JYL2; 3	11th	62

=== Complete F4 Spanish Championship results ===
(key) (Races in bold indicate pole position) (Races in italics indicate fastest lap)

Year	Team	1	2	3	4	5	6	7	8	9	10	11	12	13	14	15	16	17	18	19	20	21	DC	Points
2022	Campos	ALG; 1; 23	ALG; 2; 23	ALG; 3; 16	JER; 1	JER; 2	JER; 3	CRT; 1	CRT; 2	CRT; 3	SPA; 1	SPA; 2	SPA; 3	ARA; 1	ARA; 2	ARA; 3	NAV; 1; 24	NAV; 2; 23	NAV; 3 Ret	CAT; 1; 29†	CAT; 2; 21	CAT; 3; 23	32nd	0
2023	Campos Racing	SPA; 1; 12	SPA; 2; 25	SPA; 3 Ret	ARA; 1; 8	ARA; 2; 14	ARA; 3; 14	NAV; 1; 12	NAV; 2; 12	NAV; 3; 14	JER; 1; 28†	JER; 2; 11	JER; 3; 12	EST; 1; 20	EST; 2 Ret	EST; 3; 14	CRT; 1; 18	CRT; 2; 31	CRT; 3; 20	CAT; 1; 27	CAT; 2; 19	CAT; 3; 25†	19th	4

=== Complete Italian F4 Championship results ===
(key) (Races in bold indicate pole position) (Races in italics indicate fastest lap)

Year	Team	1	2	3	4	5	6	7	8	9	10	11	12	13	14	15	16	17	18	19	20	21	22	DC	Points
2022	Monlau Motorsport	IMO; 1	IMO; 2	IMO; 3	MIS; 1	MIS; 2	MIS; 3	SPA; 1	SPA; 2	SPA; 3	VLL; 1	VLL; 2	VLL; 3	RBR; 1	RBR; 2	RBR; 3	RBR; 4	MNZ; 1	MNZ; 2	MNZ; 3	MUG; 1; 23	MUG; 2; 24	MUG; 3; 17	42nd	0
2023	BVM Racing	IMO; 1	IMO; 2; 10	IMO; 3; 14	IMO; 4 Ret	MIS; 1	MIS; 2	MIS; 3	SPA; 1	SPA; 2	SPA; 3	MNZ; 1	MNZ; 2	MNZ; 3	LEC; 1	LEC; 2	LEC; 3	MUG; 1	MUG; 2	MUG; 3	VLL; 1	VLL; 2	VLL; 3	25th	1

=== Complete Formula 4 UAE Championship results ===
(key) (Races in bold indicate pole position) (Races in italics indicate fastest lap)

Year	Team	1	2	3	4	5	6	7	8	9	10	11	12	13	14	15	Pos	Points
2023	R-ace GP	DUB1; 1; 10	DUB1; 2 Ret	DUB1; 3; 5	KMT1; 1; 14	KMT1; 2; 16	KMT1; 3; 6	KMT2; 1; 26	KMT2; 2; 30	KMT2; 3 Ret	DUB2; 1 Ret	DUB2; 2; 10	DUB2; 3; 30	YMC; 1; 31†	YMC; 2; 12	YMC; 3; 18	18th	20

=== Complete Eurocup-3 results ===
(key) (Races in bold indicate pole position) (Races in italics indicate fastest lap)

Year	Team	1	2	3	4	5	6	7	8	9	10	11	12	13	14	15	16	17	18	DC	Points
2023	GRS Team	SPA; 1	SPA; 2	ARA; 1	ARA; 2	MNZ; 1	MNZ; 2	ZAN; 1; 15	ZAN; 2; 12	JER; 1	JER; 2	EST; 1	EST; 2	CRT; 1	CRT; 2	CAT; 1	CAT; 2			22nd	0
2024	Campos Racing	SPA; 1	SPA; 2	RBR; 1	RBR; 2	POR; 1	POR; 2	POR; 3	LEC; 1 Ret	LEC; 2; 3	ZAN; 1; 13	ZAN; 2; 21	**ARA**; **1**; 1	ARA; 2; 10	JER; 1; 8	JER; 2; 6	CAT; 1; 4	CAT; 2; 7		8th	80
2025	Griffin Core by Campos	RBR; 1; 11	RBR; 2; 7	POR; 1; 1	POR; SR; 6	**POR**; **2**; 28	LEC; 1; 5	LEC; SR; Ret	LEC; 2; 4	MNZ; 1 Ret	MNZ; 2; 6	ASS; 1; 6	ASS; 2; 6	**SPA**; **1**; 1	SPA; 2; 3	JER; 1; 7	JER; 2; 25	CAT; 1; 18	CAT; 2; 3	5th	152

=== Complete Formula Regional European Championship results ===
(key) (Races in bold indicate pole position) (Races in italics indicate fastest lap)

Year	Team	1	2	3	4	5	6	7	8	9	10	11	12	13	14	15	16	17	18	19	20	DC	Points
2023	Van Amersfoort Racing	IMO; 1	IMO; 2	CAT; 1	CAT; 2	HUN; 1	HUN; 2	SPA; 1	SPA; 2	MUG; 1	MUG; 2	LEC; 1	LEC; 2	RBR; 1; 23	RBR; 2; 26	MNZ; 1 Ret	MNZ; 2; 28	ZAN; 1	ZAN; 2	HOC; 1	HOC; 2	42nd	0
2024	G4 Racing	HOC; 1; 22	HOC; 2; 19	SPA; 1; 23	SPA; 2; 23	ZAN; 1; 20	ZAN; 2; 20	HUN; 1; 25	HUN; 2; 23	MUG; 1	MUG; 2	LEC; 1	LEC; 2	IMO; 1	IMO; 2	RBR; 1	RBR; 2	CAT; 1	CAT; 2	MNZ; 1	MNZ; 2	33rd	0

=== Complete Formula Regional Middle East Championship / Formula Regional Middle East Trophy results ===
(key) (Races in bold indicate pole position) (Races in italics indicate fastest lap)

Year	Entrant	1	2	3	4	5	6	7	8	9	10	11	12	13	14	15	DC	Points
2024	R-ace GP	YMC1; 1; 24	YMC1; 2; 19	YMC1; 3; 14	YMC2; 1; 19	YMC2; 2; 11	YMC2; 3; 24	DUB1; 1; 23	DUB1; 2; 19	DUB1; 3; 25	YMC3; 1; 14	YMC3; 2 DNS	YMC3; 3; 16	DUB2; 1; 13	DUB2; 2; 21	DUB2; 3; 15	25th	0
2025	Pinnacle Motorsport	YMC1; 1; 11	YMC1; 2; 10	YMC1; 3; 3	YMC2; 1; 4	YMC2; 2; 10	YMC2; 3; 17	DUB; 1	DUB; 2	DUB; 3	YMC3; 1	YMC3; 2	YMC3; 3	LUS; 1; 21	LUS; 2; 16	LUS; 3; 14	15th	41
2026	MP Motorsport	YMC1; 1	YMC1; 2	YMC1; 3	YMC2; 1	YMC2; 2	YMC2; 3	DUB; 1 Ret	DUB; 2; 19	DUB; 3; 12	LUS; 1; 11	LUS; 2 C	LUS; 3 DSQ				26th	0

=== Complete Eurocup-3 Spanish Winter Championship results ===
(key) (Races in bold indicate pole position) (Races in italics indicate fastest lap)

Year	Team	1	2	3	4	5	6	7	8	DC	Points
2025	Griffin Core by Campos	JER; 1 Ret	JER; 2; 8	JER; 3; 5	POR; 1; 16	POR; 2; 24†	POR; 3; 13	ARA; 1; 2	ARA; 2; 4	8th	42

=== Complete FIA Formula 3 Championship results ===
(key) (Races in bold indicate pole position) (Races in italics indicate fastest lap)

Year	Entrant	1	2	3	4	5	6	7	8	9	10	11	12	13	14	15	16	17	18	19	20	DC	Points
2025	Hitech TGR	MEL; SPR	MEL; FEA	BHR; SPR	BHR; FEA	IMO; SPR	IMO; FEA	MON; SPR	MON; FEA	CAT; SPR; 23	CAT; FEA; 25	RBR; SPR; 14	RBR; FEA; 13	SIL; SPR	SIL; FEA	SPA; SPR	SPA; FEA	HUN; SPR	HUN; FEA	MNZ; SPR	MNZ; FEA	31st	0

=== Complete Euroformula Open Championship results ===
(key) (Races in bold indicate pole position) (Races in italics indicate fastest lap)

Year	Entrant	1	2	3	4	5	6	7	8	9	10	11	12	13	14	15	16	17	18	19	20	21	22	23	24	DC	Points
2026	Team Motopark	PRT; 1; 4	PRT; 2; 7	PRT; 3 (Ret)	SPA; 1 (13†)	SPA; 2; 3	SPA; 3; 6	MIS; 1; 5	MIS; 2; 1	MIS; 3; 1	HUN; 1; 6	HUN; 2; 5	HUN; 3; 3	**LEC**; **1**; 1	LEC; 2; 6	LEC; 3 (11†)	**HOC**; **1**; 2	HOC; 2; 2	HOC; 3; 4	**MNZ**; **1**; 8	MNZ; 2; 4	MNZ; 3; 2	**CAT**; **1**; 2	CAT; 2; 5	CAT; 3; 8	3rd	291

* Season still in progress.
