= Sturup Raceway =

Motorsport track in Svedala, Sweden

- Full Circuit (2005–present)
- Location: Svedala, Sweden
- Coordinates: 55°31′52″N 13°21′24″E
- Owner: Brask (2001–present)
- Opened: 1972 (rallycross track); 1990 (asphalt track)
- Former names: Sturupsbanan
- Major events: Current: Nordic 4 (2022, 2026); Former: STCC (2007–2008, 2012); Porsche Carrera Cup Scandinavia (2007–2008, 2012); Formula BMW Talent Cup (2011–2012); DTCC (2005–2008)
- Website: http://www.sturupraceway.com/

Full Circuit (2005–present)
- Length: 2.133 km (1.325 mi)
- Turns: 12
- Race lap record: 0.59.040 ( (Denmark) Julius Dinesen, Mygale M14-F4, 2022, F4)

Full Circuit (2004)
- Length: 1.480 km (0.920 mi)
- Turns: 9

Original Circuit (1990–2003)
- Length: 1.100 km (0.684 mi)
- Turns: 7

Sturup Raceway is a motor racing circuit in Svedala, Sweden. It has been owned by the Danish Brask organisation since 2001. The circuit, by then called Sturupsbanan, opened in 1972 as a Rallycross venue. Later named Skånecrossbanan it was first asphalted to become a permanent road course in 1990. In 2004 and 2005 major work including a track extension from 1.100 km (0.684 mi) to 2.133 km (1.325 mi) with a new pit lane.

Sturup held rounds of both the Swedish Touring Car Championship and Danish Touringcar Championship in 2008, but neither returned in 2009. The new Scandinavian Touring Car Championship returned to Sturup in 2012.

== Lap records ==
As of June 2022, the fastest official race lap records at the Sturup Raceway are listed as:

Category	Time	Driver	Vehicle	Event
Full Circuit (2005–present): 2.133 km (1.325 mi)
Formula 4	0.59.040	Julius Dinesen	Mygale M14-F4	2022 Sturup Danish F4 round
Formula Ford	0.59.593	Mads Hoe	Mygale SJ08	2022 Sturup Danish F4 round
Porsche Carrera Cup	1:01.562	Johan Kristoffersson	Porsche 911 (997 II) GT3 Cup	2012 Sturup Porsche Carrera Cup Scandinavia round
Super 2000	1.02.169	Mattias Andersson	Alfa Romeo 156 GTA Super 2000	2008 Sturup STCC round
Renault Clio Cup	1:08.038	Marcus Fluch	Renault Clio IV RS	2012 Sturup Renault Clio Cup Sweden round
