= 2024 Le Mans Cup =

European racing season

The 2024 Le Mans Cup, known as the 2024 Michelin Le Mans Cup under sponsorship, was the ninth season of the Le Mans Cup. The six-event series began at Circuit de Barcelona-Catalunya on 13 April and concluded at Algarve International Circuit on 19 October. The series was open to Le Mans Prototypes in the LMP3 class, and grand tourer sports cars in the GT3 class.

== Calendar ==
The provisional calendar for the 2024 season was announced on 12 September 2023. Mugello Circuit was added to the calendar for the first time, replacing the round at MotorLand Aragón.

Rnd	Circuit	Location	Race Length	Date
1	(Spain) Circuit de Barcelona-Catalunya	Montmeló, Spain	1 hour, 50 mins	13 April
2	(France) Circuit Paul Ricard	Le Castellet, France	1 hour, 50 mins	4 May
3	(France) Circuit de la Sarthe	Le Mans, France	55 minutes	14 June
3	(France) Circuit de la Sarthe	Le Mans, France	55 minutes	15 June
4	(Belgium) Circuit de Spa-Francorchamps	Stavelot, Belgium	1 hour, 50 mins	24 August
5	(Italy) Mugello Circuit	Scarperia e San Piero, Italy	1 hour, 50 mins	28 September
6	(Portugal) Algarve International Circuit	Portimão, Portugal	1 hour, 50 mins	19 October

== Entries ==
=== LMP3 ===
All cars in the LMP3 class used the 2020 spec Nissan VK56DE 5.6L V8 engine and Michelin tyres.

Entrant/Team	Chassis	No.	Drivers	Rounds
(Spain) CD Sport	Ligier JS P320	2	(France) Willyam Gosselin	All
(Spain) CD Sport	Ligier JS P320	2	(Lebanon) Shahan Sarkissian	All
(Spain) CD Sport	Ligier JS P320	11	(France) Franck Chappard	All
(Spain) CD Sport	Ligier JS P320	11	(United Kingdom) Chris Short	All
(Luxembourg) DKR Engineering	Duqueine M30 - D08	3	(China) Xinzhe Xie	3
(Luxembourg) DKR Engineering	Duqueine M30 - D08	3	(China) Pengcheng Ye	3
(United Kingdom) Nielsen Racing	Ligier JS P320	4	(Canada) Garett Grist	3
(United Kingdom) Nielsen Racing	Ligier JS P320	4	(United States) Anthony McIntosh	3
(United Kingdom) Nielsen Racing	Ligier JS P320	7	(United Kingdom) Wayne Boyd	All
(United Kingdom) Nielsen Racing	Ligier JS P320	7	(United Kingdom) Anthony Wells	All
(United Kingdom) RLR MSport	Ligier JS P320	5	(Mexico) Ian Aguilera	3
(United Kingdom) RLR MSport	Ligier JS P320	5	(Australia) Garth Walden	3
(France) ANS Motorsport	Ligier JS P320	6	(France) Nicolas Schatz	2–6
(France) ANS Motorsport	Ligier JS P320	6	(France) Clément Moreno	2–3
(France) ANS Motorsport	Ligier JS P320	6	(Belgium) Eric De Doncker	4–6
(France) ANS Motorsport	Ligier JS P320	84	(France) Julien Lemoine	All
(France) ANS Motorsport	Ligier JS P320	84	(France) Paul Trojani	All
(Poland) Team Virage	Ligier JS P320	8	(Portugal) Bernardo Pinheiro	3
(Poland) Team Virage	Ligier JS P320	8	(Greece) Georgios Kolovos	3
(Poland) Team Virage	Ligier JS P320	44	(Greece) Georgios Kolovos	4–6
(Poland) Team Virage	Ligier JS P320	44	(Romania) Mihnea Ștefan	All
(Poland) Team Virage	Ligier JS P320	44	(United Kingdom) Jamie Falvey	1–3
(Poland) Team Virage	Ligier JS P320	59	(Paraguay) Oscar Bittar	All
(Poland) Team Virage	Ligier JS P320	59	(Brazil) Ricardo Gracia Filho	All
(Poland) Team Virage	Ligier JS P320	76	(France) Raphaël Narac	3
(Poland) Team Virage	Ligier JS P320	76	(Poland) Jacek Zielonka	3
(Switzerland) Graff	Ligier JS P320	9	(Switzerland) Axel Gnos	2
(Switzerland) Graff	Ligier JS P320	9	(Greece) Georgios Kolovos	2
(Switzerland) Graff	Ligier JS P320	9	(China) Haowen Luo	3
(Switzerland) Graff	Ligier JS P320	9	(France) Louis Rossi	3
(Switzerland) Racing Spirit of Léman	Ligier JS P320	10	(France) Marius Fossard	All
(Switzerland) Racing Spirit of Léman	Ligier JS P320	10	(France) Christophe Lapierre	All
(Switzerland) Racing Spirit of Léman	Ligier JS P320	64	(Austria) Michael Doppelmayr	3
(Switzerland) Racing Spirit of Léman	Ligier JS P320	64	(Germany) Pierre Kaffer	3
(France) M Racing	Ligier JS P320	13	(France) Alexandre Cougnaud	All
(France) M Racing	Ligier JS P320	13	(France) Romano Ricci	All
(France) IDEC Sport	Ligier JS P320	17	(France) Patrice Lafargue	1–3
(France) IDEC Sport	Ligier JS P320	17	(France) Dino Lunardi	1–3
(Denmark) High Class Racing	Ligier JS P320	20	(United Kingdom) Tommy Foster	All
(Denmark) High Class Racing	Ligier JS P320	20	(Denmark) Jens Reno Møller	All
(Iceland) Team Thor	Ligier JS P320	77	(Iceland) Auðunn Guðmundsson	All
(Iceland) Team Thor	Ligier JS P320	77	(United Kingdom) Colin Noble	All
(Italy) EuroInternational	Ligier JS P320	21	(Canada) Daniel Ali	3
(Italy) EuroInternational	Ligier JS P320	21	(Finland) Miika Panu	3
(Italy) EuroInternational	Ligier JS P320	31	(France) Jean-René de Fournoux	3
(Italy) EuroInternational	Ligier JS P320	31	(France) Hugo Rosati	3
(Germany) / WTM by Rinaldi Racing (Note: Car No. 22 entered as WTM by Rinaldi Racing. Cars No. 66 and No. 71 entered as Rinaldi Racing.); (Germany) / Rinaldi Racing	Duqueine M30 - D08	22	(Germany) Torsten Kratz	3
(Germany) / WTM by Rinaldi Racing; (Germany) / Rinaldi Racing	Duqueine M30 - D08	22	(Germany) Leonard Weiss	3
(Germany) / WTM by Rinaldi Racing; (Germany) / Rinaldi Racing	Ligier JS P320	66	(Germany) Steve Parrow	All
(Germany) / WTM by Rinaldi Racing; (Germany) / Rinaldi Racing	Ligier JS P320	66	(Germany) Daniel Keilwitz	1–4
(Germany) / WTM by Rinaldi Racing; (Germany) / Rinaldi Racing	Ligier JS P320	66	(United States) Wyatt Brichacek	5–6
(Germany) / WTM by Rinaldi Racing; (Germany) / Rinaldi Racing	Ligier JS P320	71	(Germany) Stefan Aust	All
(Germany) / WTM by Rinaldi Racing; (Germany) / Rinaldi Racing	Ligier JS P320	71	(Germany) Felipe Fernández Laser	All
(Czech Republic) Bretton Racing	Ligier JS P320	26	(Czech Republic) Dan Skočdopole	1–3, 5
(Czech Republic) Bretton Racing	Ligier JS P320	26	(United Kingdom) Jamie Falvey	4–6
(Czech Republic) Bretton Racing	Ligier JS P320	26	(France) Sacha Lehmann	4
(Czech Republic) Bretton Racing	Ligier JS P320	26	(United Kingdom) Teddy Wilson	6
(Czech Republic) Bretton Racing	Ligier JS P320	26	(United Kingdom) Ben Stone	1–3
(Czech Republic) Bretton Racing	Ligier JS P320	62	(United Kingdom) Ben Stone	4–6
(Czech Republic) Bretton Racing	Ligier JS P320	62	(Switzerland) Axel Gnos	1
(Czech Republic) Bretton Racing	Ligier JS P320	62	(Greece) Georgios Kolovos	1
(Czech Republic) Bretton Racing	Ligier JS P320	62	(France) Romain Iannetta	2
(Czech Republic) Bretton Racing	Ligier JS P320	62	(Poland) Szymon Ładniak	2–3
(Czech Republic) Bretton Racing	Ligier JS P320	62	(United States) Ace Robey	3
(Czech Republic) Bretton Racing	Ligier JS P320	62	(Denmark) Theodor Jensen	4–6
(United Kingdom) P4 Racing	Ligier JS P320	27	(United Kingdom) Andrew Ferguson	All
(United Kingdom) P4 Racing	Ligier JS P320	27	(United Kingdom) Louis Hamilton-Smith	All
(France) MV2S Racing	Ligier JS P320	28	(United Kingdom) Kenzie Beecroft	1
(France) MV2S Racing	Ligier JS P320	28	(France) Romain Iannetta	1
(France) MV2S Racing	Ligier JS P320	28	(France) Maxence Maurice	3
(France) MV2S Racing	Ligier JS P320	28	Viacheslav Gutak (Note: Gutak is Russian, but he competes as a neutral competitor as Russian national emblems were banned by the FIA following the Russian invasion of Ukraine. Bukhantsov, also a Russian, competes under an Emirati licence for the same reason.)	3–6
(France) MV2S Racing	Ligier JS P320	28	(United Kingdom) Terrence Woodward	4–6
(France) MV2S Racing	Ligier JS P320	29	(Spain) Maximus Mayer	All
(France) MV2S Racing	Ligier JS P320	29	(France) Clément Moreno	1
(France) MV2S Racing	Ligier JS P320	29	(France) Christophe Cresp	2–3
(France) MV2S Racing	Ligier JS P320	29	(Poland) Jacek Zielonka	4–6
(Poland) Inter Europol Competition	Ligier JS P320	34	(United Arab Emirates) Alexander Bukhantsov	All
(Poland) Inter Europol Competition	Ligier JS P320	34	(Netherlands) Rik Koen	All
(Poland) Inter Europol Competition	Ligier JS P320	43	(United Kingdom) Tim Creswick	All
(Poland) Inter Europol Competition	Ligier JS P320	43	(Denmark) Sebastian Gravlund	1–4, 6
(Poland) Inter Europol Competition	Ligier JS P320	43	(Canada) Daniel Ali	5
(United Kingdom) Steller Motorsport	Duqueine M30 - D08	42	(United Kingdom) Sennan Fielding	1–4, 6
(United Kingdom) Steller Motorsport	Duqueine M30 - D08	42	(France) Sylvain Guintoli	1–3
(United Kingdom) Steller Motorsport	Duqueine M30 - D08	42	(United Kingdom) Josh Caygill	4
(United Kingdom) Steller Motorsport	Duqueine M30 - D08	42	(United Kingdom) Andrew Bentley	6
(Germany) Reiter Engineering	Ligier JS P320	50	(Austria) Horst Felbermayr Jr.	All
(Germany) Reiter Engineering	Ligier JS P320	50	(Germany) Moritz Löhner	1
(Germany) Reiter Engineering	Ligier JS P320	50	(Switzerland) Miklas Born	2–6
(Australia) GG Classics	Ligier JS P320	58	(Australia) George Nakas	All
(Australia) GG Classics	Ligier JS P320	58	(Australia) Fraser Ross	All
(Switzerland) Haegeli by T2 Racing	Duqueine M30 - D08	67	(Switzerland) Pieder Decurtins	All
(Switzerland) Haegeli by T2 Racing	Duqueine M30 - D08	67	(Switzerland) Samir Ben	All
(Switzerland) Haegeli by T2 Racing	Duqueine M30 - D08	68	(Germany) Marcel Oosenbrugh	3
(Switzerland) Haegeli by T2 Racing	Duqueine M30 - D08	68	(Germany) Dominik Schraml	3
(France) R-ace GP	Duqueine M30 - D08	85	(France) Hadrien David	All
(France) R-ace GP	Duqueine M30 - D08	85	(France) Fabien Michal	All
(Switzerland) Cool Racing	Ligier JS P320	87	(France) Adrien Closmenil	All
(Switzerland) Cool Racing	Ligier JS P320	87	(United Kingdom) James Sweetnam	All
(Switzerland) Cool Racing	Ligier JS P320	97	(France) Adrien Chila	All
(Switzerland) Cool Racing	Ligier JS P320	97	(Switzerland) David Droux	All
(Netherlands) More Motorsport	Ligier JS P320	99	(Netherlands) Mark van der Snel	All
(Netherlands) More Motorsport	Ligier JS P320	99	(Netherlands) Max van der Snel	All

- Murphy Prototypes was scheduled to field a Duqueine M30 - D08 for Ayrton Simmons, but did not appear in any rounds.
- Several drivers were scheduled to contest the season but did not appear. These include Jonathan Brossard at ANS Motorsport, Jiří Navrátil and Josef Knopp at Bretton Racing, and Bernard Delhez and Matthias Lüthen at MV2S Racing.

=== GT3 ===
Entrant/Team	Chassis	Engine	No.	Drivers	Rounds
(Switzerland) Kessel Racing	Ferrari 296 GT3	Ferrari F163CE 3.0 L Turbo V6	12	(Italy) David Fumanelli	All
(Switzerland) Kessel Racing	Ferrari 296 GT3	Ferrari F163CE 3.0 L Turbo V6	12	(France) Frédéric Jousset	All
(Switzerland) Kessel Racing	Ferrari 296 GT3	Ferrari F163CE 3.0 L Turbo V6	57	(Canada) Orey Fidani	3
(Switzerland) Kessel Racing	Ferrari 296 GT3	Ferrari F163CE 3.0 L Turbo V6	57	(Germany) Lars Kern	3
(Switzerland) Kessel Racing	Ferrari 296 GT3	Ferrari F163CE 3.0 L Turbo V6	74	(United Kingdom) Andrew Gilbert	All
(Switzerland) Kessel Racing	Ferrari 296 GT3	Ferrari F163CE 3.0 L Turbo V6	74	(Spain) Fran Rueda	All
(Germany) GetSpeed	Mercedes-AMG GT3 Evo	Mercedes-AMG M159 6.2 L V8	14	(United States) Anthony Bartone	3
(Germany) GetSpeed	Mercedes-AMG GT3 Evo	Mercedes-AMG M159 6.2 L V8	14	(Luxembourg) Steve Jans	3
(Denmark) High Class Racing	Porsche 911 GT3 R (992)	Porsche M97/80 4.2 L Flat-6	18	(United Kingdom) Nick Jones	All
(Denmark) High Class Racing	Porsche 911 GT3 R (992)	Porsche M97/80 4.2 L Flat-6	18	(United Kingdom) Scott Malvern	1–2
(Denmark) High Class Racing	Porsche 911 GT3 R (992)	Porsche M97/80 4.2 L Flat-6	18	(Germany) Sven Müller	3, 5–6
(Denmark) High Class Racing	Porsche 911 GT3 R (992)	Porsche M97/80 4.2 L Flat-6	18	(Germany) Nico Menzel	4
(Spain) Biogas Motorsport	Ferrari 296 GT3	Ferrari F163CE 3.0 L Turbo V6	23	(Spain) Marc Carol	All
(Spain) Biogas Motorsport	Ferrari 296 GT3	Ferrari F163CE 3.0 L Turbo V6	23	(Spain) Josep Mayola	All
(United Kingdom) Steller Motorsport	Audi R8 LMS Evo II	Audi DAR 5.2 L V10	24	(United Kingdom) Darren Malkin	1–2
(United Kingdom) Steller Motorsport	Audi R8 LMS Evo II	Audi DAR 5.2 L V10	24	(Germany) Alex Aka	1
(United Kingdom) Steller Motorsport	Audi R8 LMS Evo II	Audi DAR 5.2 L V10	24	(United Kingdom) Kiern Jewiss	2
(United Kingdom) Steller Motorsport	Audi R8 LMS Evo II	Audi DAR 5.2 L V10	24	(United Kingdom) Rory Butcher	3
(United Kingdom) Steller Motorsport	Audi R8 LMS Evo II	Audi DAR 5.2 L V10	24	(United Kingdom) Dominic Paul	3
(United Kingdom) Steller Motorsport	Audi R8 LMS Evo II	Audi DAR 5.2 L V10	24	(United Kingdom) Andrew Bentley	4–5
(United Kingdom) Steller Motorsport	Audi R8 LMS Evo II	Audi DAR 5.2 L V10	24	(United Kingdom) James Walker	4
(United Kingdom) Steller Motorsport	Audi R8 LMS Evo II	Audi DAR 5.2 L V10	24	(United Kingdom) Sennan Fielding	5
(United Kingdom) Steller Motorsport	Audi R8 LMS Evo II	Audi DAR 5.2 L V10	24	(United Kingdom) Charles Bateman	6
(United Kingdom) Steller Motorsport	Audi R8 LMS Evo II	Audi DAR 5.2 L V10	24	(United Kingdom) Alex Martin	6
(Germany) Heart of Racing by SPS	Mercedes-AMG GT3 Evo	Mercedes-AMG M159 6.2 L V8	25	(United States) Gray Newell	3
(Germany) Heart of Racing by SPS	Mercedes-AMG GT3 Evo	Mercedes-AMG M159 6.2 L V8	25	(Germany) Valentin Pierburg	3
(Italy) AF Corse	Ferrari 296 GT3	Ferrari F163CE 3.0 L Turbo V6	51	(Italy) Alessandro Balzan	All
(Italy) AF Corse	Ferrari 296 GT3	Ferrari F163CE 3.0 L Turbo V6	51	(United States) Matt Kurzejewski	All
(Italy) AF Corse	Ferrari 296 GT3	Ferrari F163CE 3.0 L Turbo V6	80	(Switzerland) Gino Forgione	3
(Italy) AF Corse	Ferrari 296 GT3	Ferrari F163CE 3.0 L Turbo V6	80	(Italy) Michele Rugolo	3
(Italy) AF Corse	Ferrari 296 GT3	Ferrari F163CE 3.0 L Turbo V6	82	(France) Emmanuel Collard	3
(Italy) AF Corse	Ferrari 296 GT3	Ferrari F163CE 3.0 L Turbo V6	82	(France) Charles-Henri Samani	3
(Italy) AF Corse	Ferrari 296 GT3	Ferrari F163CE 3.0 L Turbo V6	88	(Italy) Riccardo Agostini	All
(Italy) AF Corse	Ferrari 296 GT3	Ferrari F163CE 3.0 L Turbo V6	88	(Brazil) Custodio Toledo	All
(Austria) Team Motopark	Mercedes-AMG GT3 Evo	Mercedes-AMG M159 6.2 L V8	65	(Germany) Heiko Neumann	3
(Austria) Team Motopark	Mercedes-AMG GT3 Evo	Mercedes-AMG M159 6.2 L V8	65	(Germany) Timo Rumpfkeil	3
(Germany) Proton Huber Competition	Porsche 911 GT3 R (992)	Porsche M97/80 4.2 L Flat-6	73	(Germany) Jörg Dreisow	All
(Germany) Proton Huber Competition	Porsche 911 GT3 R (992)	Porsche M97/80 4.2 L Flat-6	73	(Germany) Manuel Lauck	All
(Italy) Iron Dames	Lamborghini Huracán GT3 Evo 2	Lamborghini DGF 5.2 L V10	83	(Switzerland) Karen Gaillard	All
(Italy) Iron Dames	Lamborghini Huracán GT3 Evo 2	Lamborghini DGF 5.2 L V10	83	(France) Célia Martin	All
(United Kingdom) Blackthorn	Aston Martin Vantage AMR GT3 Evo	Aston Martin M177 4.0 L Turbo V8	90	(Australia) Martin Berry	3
(United Kingdom) Blackthorn	Aston Martin Vantage AMR GT3 Evo	Aston Martin M177 4.0 L Turbo V8	90	(United Kingdom) Lorcan Hanafin	3
(United Kingdom) Blackthorn	Aston Martin Vantage AMR GT3 Evo	Aston Martin M177 4.0 L Turbo V8	90	(United Kingdom) Ross Kaiser	5–6
(United Kingdom) Blackthorn	Aston Martin Vantage AMR GT3 Evo	Aston Martin M177 4.0 L Turbo V8	90	(United Kingdom) James Swift	5–6
(United Kingdom) Blackthorn	Aston Martin Vantage AMR GT3 Evo	Aston Martin M177 4.0 L Turbo V8	91	(Switzerland) Claude Bovet	2–6
(United Kingdom) Blackthorn	Aston Martin Vantage AMR GT3 Evo	Aston Martin M177 4.0 L Turbo V8	91	(United Kingdom) David McDonald	2–3, 5–6
(United Kingdom) Blackthorn	Aston Martin Vantage AMR GT3 Evo	Aston Martin M177 4.0 L Turbo V8	91	(United Kingdom) Darren Turner	4
(Germany) Herberth Motorsport	Porsche 911 GT3 R (992)	Porsche M97/80 4.2 L Flat-6	92	(United States) Jason Hart	4
(Germany) Herberth Motorsport	Porsche 911 GT3 R (992)	Porsche M97/80 4.2 L Flat-6	92	(United States) Scott Noble	4
(Switzerland) Racing Spirit of Léman	Aston Martin Vantage AMR GT3 Evo	Aston Martin M177 4.0 L Turbo V8	95	(United States) Derek DeBoer	3
(Switzerland) Racing Spirit of Léman	Aston Martin Vantage AMR GT3 Evo	Aston Martin M177 4.0 L Turbo V8	95	(France) Valentin Hasse-Clot	3

- Leipert Motorsport was scheduled to run a pair of Lamborghini Huracán GT3 Evo 2 for Brendon Leitch, Gerhard Watzinger, Marcel Leipert and an unconfirmed driver, but did not appear in any rounds.
- Several drivers were scheduled to contest the season but did not appear. These include Nick Moss and Joe Osborne for Blackthorn, as well as Richard Williams for Steller Motorsport.

== Race results ==
Bold indicates the overall winner.

Round		Circuit	LMP3 Winners	GT3 Winners
1		(Spain) Catalunya	**(Denmark) No. 20 High Class Racing**	(Italy) No. 51 AF Corse
1		(Spain) Catalunya	**(United Kingdom) Tommy Foster** **(Denmark) Jens Reno Møller**	(Italy) Alessandro Balzan (United States) Matt Kurzejewski
2		(France) Le Castellet	**(Switzerland) No. 97 Cool Racing**	(Italy) No. 51 AF Corse
2		(France) Le Castellet	**(France) Adrien Chila** **(Switzerland) David Droux**	(Italy) Alessandro Balzan (United States) Matt Kurzejewski
3	R1	(France) Le Mans (report)	**(Germany) No. 22 WTM by Rinaldi Racing**	(Switzerland) No. 12 Kessel Racing
3	R1	(France) Le Mans (report)	**(Germany) Torsten Kratz** **(Germany) Leonard Weiss**	(Italy) David Fumanelli (France) Frédéric Jousset
3	R2	(France) Le Mans (report)	**(France) No. 29 MV2S Racing**	(United Kingdom) No. 90 Blackthorn
3	R2	(France) Le Mans (report)	**(France) Christophe Cresp** **(Spain) Maximus Mayer**	(Australia) Martin Berry (United Kingdom) Lorcan Hanafin
4		(Belgium) Spa-Francorchamps	**(Czech Republic) No. 62 Bretton Racing**	(Italy) No. 88 AF Corse
4		(Belgium) Spa-Francorchamps	**(Denmark) Theodor Jensen** **(United Kingdom) Ben Stone**	(Italy) Riccardo Agostini (Brazil) Custodio Toledo
5		(Italy) Mugello	**(France) No. 85 R-ace GP**	(Italy) No. 51 AF Corse
5		(Italy) Mugello	**(France) Hadrien David** **(France) Fabien Michal**	(Italy) Alessandro Balzan (United States) Matt Kurzejewski
6		(Portugal) Portimão	**(Iceland) No. 77 Team Thor**	(Italy) No. 51 AF Corse
6		(Portugal) Portimão	**(Iceland) Auðunn Guðmundsson** **(United Kingdom) Colin Noble**	(Italy) Alessandro Balzan (United States) Matt Kurzejewski

== Championship Standings ==
Points are awarded according to the following structure:

Position	1st	2nd	3rd	4th	5th	6th	7th	8th	9th	10th	Pole
Points	25	18	15	12	10	8	6	4	2	1	1
Le Mans	15	9	7	6	5	4	3	2	1		1

=== LMP3 Drivers Championship ===
Pos.	Driver	Team	BAR (Spain)	LEC (France)	LMS (France)		SPA (Belgium)	MUG (Italy)	POR (Portugal)	Points
1	(France) Adrien Chila	(Switzerland) Cool Racing	5	1	4	2	9	4	4	73.5
1	(Switzerland) David Droux	(Switzerland) Cool Racing	5	1	4	2	9	4	4	73.5
2	(France) Hadrien David	(France) R-ace GP	**2**	**3**	21	5	**Ret**	**1**	**14**	68
2	(France) Fabien Michal	(France) R-ace GP	**2**	**3**	21	5	**Ret**	**1**	**14**	68
3	(United Kingdom) Tommy Foster	(Denmark) High Class Racing	1	6	14	3	Ret	7	3	61
3	(Denmark) Jens Reno Møller	(Denmark) High Class Racing	1	6	14	3	Ret	7	3	61
4	(Iceland) Auðunn Guðmundsson	(Iceland) Team Thor	6	5	5	7	Ret	5	1	60
4	(United Kingdom) Colin Noble	(Iceland) Team Thor	6	5	5	7	Ret	5	1	60
5	(France) Adrien Closmenil	(Switzerland) Cool Racing	4	12	**Ret**	8	2	6	5	52
5	(United Kingdom) James Sweetnam	(Switzerland) Cool Racing	4	12	**Ret**	8	2	6	5	52
6	(United Kingdom) Wayne Boyd	(United Kingdom) Nielsen Racing	8	7	6	9	Ret	3	2	47.5
6	(United Kingdom) Anthony Wells	(United Kingdom) Nielsen Racing	8	7	6	9	Ret	3	2	47.5
7	(United Kingdom) Ben Stone	(Czech Republic) Bretton Racing	17	26	32	16	1	2	23	43
8	(Denmark) Theodor Jensen	(Czech Republic) Bretton Racing					1	2	23	43
9	(Germany) Stefan Aust	(Germany) WTM by Rinaldi Racing	14	15	2	21	4	8	21	23.5
9	(Germany) Felipe Fernández Laser	(Germany) WTM by Rinaldi Racing	14	15	2	21	4	8	21	23.5
10	(France) Alexandre Cougnaud	(France) M Racing	15	4	3	10	7	20	Ret	23.5
10	(France) Romano Ricci	(France) M Racing	15	4	3	10	7	20	Ret	23.5
11	(Romania) Mihnea Ștefan	(Poland) Team Virage	Ret	2	10	19	16	12	10	21.5
12	(United Arab Emirates) Alexander Bukhantsov	(Poland) Inter Europol Competition	3	8	Ret	11	Ret	9	16	21
12	(Netherlands) Rik Koen	(Poland) Inter Europol Competition	3	8	Ret	11	Ret	9	16	21
13	(United Kingdom) Jamie Falvey	(Poland) Team Virage	Ret	2	10	19				19.5
13	(United Kingdom) Jamie Falvey	(Czech Republic) Bretton Racing					DNS	13	18	19.5
14	(Spain) Maximus Mayer	(France) MV2S Racing	23	13	20	1	12	Ret	25	15
15	(France) Christophe Cresp	(France) MV2S Racing		13	20	1				15
16	(Netherlands) Mark van der Snel	(Netherlands) More Motorsport	21	18	31	26	3	19	Ret	15
16	(Netherlands) Max van der Snel	(Netherlands) More Motorsport	21	18	31	26	3	19	Ret	15
17	(Germany) Steve Parrow	(Germany) WTM by Rinaldi Racing	7	21	11	12	Ret	11	8	13
18	(France) Nicolas Schatz	(France) ANS Motorsport		16	8	4	8	22	Ret	12
19	(France) Marius Fossard	(Switzerland) Racing Spirit of Léman	Ret	10	27	Ret	5	Ret	17	12
19	(France) Christophe Lapierre	(Switzerland) Racing Spirit of Léman	Ret	10	27	Ret	5	Ret	17	12
20	(United Kingdom) Sennan Fielding	(United Kingdom) Steller Motorsport	9	17	Ret	WD	Ret		6	10
21	(France) Clément Moreno	(France) MV2S Racing	23							8
21	(France) Clément Moreno	(France) ANS Motorsport		16	8	4				8
22	(Paraguay) Oscar Bittar	(Poland) Team Virage	24	Ret	22	25	6	Ret	24	8
22	(Brazil) Ricardo Gracia Filho	(Poland) Team Virage	24	Ret	22	25	6	Ret	24	8
23	(United Kingdom) Andrew Bentley	(United Kingdom) Steller Motorsport							6	8
24	(Germany) Daniel Keilwitz	(Germany) WTM by Rinaldi Racing	7	21	11	12	Ret			7
25	(United States) Wyatt Brichacek	(Germany) WTM by Rinaldi Racing						11	8	6
26	(United Kingdom) Tim Creswick	(Poland) Inter Europol Competition	10	22	WD	20	Ret	18	9	5
27	(Denmark) Sebastian Gravlund	(Poland) Inter Europol Competition	10	22	WD	20	Ret		9	5
28	(Belgium) Eric De Doncker	(France) ANS Motorsport					8	22	Ret	4
29	(France) Sylvain Guintoli	(United Kingdom) Steller Motorsport	9	17	Ret	WD				2
30	(France) Willyam Gosselin	(Spain) CD Sport	11	11	15	15	Ret	10	15	2
30	(Lebanon) Shahan Sarkissian	(Spain) CD Sport	11	11	15	15	Ret	10	15	2
31	(Greece) Georgios Kolovos	(Czech Republic) Bretton Racing	16							2
31	(Greece) Georgios Kolovos	(Switzerland) Graff		14						2
31	(Greece) Georgios Kolovos	(Poland) Team Virage			12	24	16	12	10	2
32	(France) Franck Chappard	(Spain) CD Sport	19	20	13	21	11	17	11	1.5
32	(United Kingdom) Chris Short	(Spain) CD Sport	19	20	13	21	11	17	11	1.5
33	(United Kingdom) Andrew Ferguson	(United Kingdom) P4 Racing	Ret	25	25	Ret	10		20	1
33	(United Kingdom) Louis Hamilton-Smith	(United Kingdom) P4 Racing	Ret	25	25	Ret	10		20	1
Pos.	Driver	Team	BAR (Spain)	LEC (France)	LMS (France)		SPA (Belgium)	MUG (Italy)	POR (Portugal)	Points

=== LMP3 Teams Championship ===
Pos.	Team	Chassis	BAR (Spain)	LEC (France)	LMS (France)		SPA (Belgium)	MUG (Italy)	POR (Portugal)	Points
1	(Switzerland) #97 Cool Racing	Ligier JS P320	5	1	4	2	9	4	4	73.5
2	(France) #85 R-ace GP	Duqueine M30 - D08	**2**	**3**	21	5	**Ret**	**1**	**14**	68
3	(Denmark) #20 High Class Racing	Ligier JS P320	1	6	14	3	Ret	7	3	61
4	(Iceland) #77 Team Thor	Ligier JS P320	6	5	5	7	Ret	5	1	60
5	(Switzerland) #87 Cool Racing	Ligier JS P320	4	12	**Ret**	8	2	6	5	52
6	(United Kingdom) #7 Nielsen Racing	Ligier JS P320	8	7	6	9	Ret	3	2	47.5
7	(Czech Republic) #62 Bretton Racing	Ligier JS P320	16	Ret	28	Ret	1	2	23	43
8	(Germany) #71 Rinaldi Racing	Ligier JS P320	14	15	2	21	4	8	21	23.5
9	(France) #13 M Racing	Ligier JS P320	15	4	3	10	7	20	Ret	23.5
10	(Poland) #44 Team Virage	Ligier JS P320	Ret	2	10	19	16	12	10	21.5
11	(Poland) #34 Inter Europol Competition	Ligier JS P320	3	8	Ret	11	Ret	9	16	21
12	(France) #29 MV2S Racing	Ligier JS P320	23	13	20	1	12	Ret	25	15
13	(Netherlands) #99 More Motorsport	Ligier JS P320	21	18	31	26	3	19	Ret	15
14	(Germany) #66 Rinaldi Racing	Ligier JS P320	7	21	11	12	Ret	11	8	13
15	(France) #6 ANS Motorsport	Ligier JS P320		16	8	4	8	22	Ret	12
16	(Switzerland) #10 Racing Spirit of Léman	Ligier JS P320	Ret	10	27	Ret	5	Ret	17	12
17	(United Kingdom) #42 Steller Motorsport	Duqueine M30 - D08	9	17	Ret	WD	Ret		6	10
18	(Poland) #59 Team Virage	Ligier JS P320	24	Ret	22	25	6	Ret	24	8
19	(Poland) #43 Inter Europol Competition	Ligier JS P320	10	22	Ret	20	Ret	18	9	5
20	(Spain) #2 CD Sport	Ligier JS P320	11	11	15	15	Ret	10	15	2
21	(Spain) #11 CD Sport	Ligier JS P320	19	20	13	21	11	17	11	1.5
22	(United Kingdom) #27 P4 Racing	Ligier JS P320	Ret	25	25	Ret	10		20	1
23	(France) #84 ANS Motorsport	Ligier JS P320	12	27	26	17	14	15	19	0
24	(France) #28 MV2S Racing	Ligier JS P320	20		23	27	Ret	Ret	12	0
25	(Switzerland) #67 Haegeli by T2 Racing	Duqueine M30 - D08	13	23	18	DSQ	15	16	13	0
26	(Czech Republic) #26 Bretton Racing	Ligier JS P320	17	26	32	16	DNS	13	18	0
27	(France) #17 IDEC Sport	Ligier JS P320	Ret	19	17	Ret				0
28	(Australia) #58 GG Classics	Ligier JS P320	18	24	30	28	Ret	21	22	0
Teams ineligible to score points
	(Germany) #50 Reiter Engineering	Ligier JS P320	22	9	Ret	Ret	13	14	7	
	(Switzerland) #9 Graff	Ligier JS P320		14	29	WD				
	(Germany) #22 WTM by Rinaldi Racing	Duqueine M30 - D08			1	6				
	(Italy) #21 EuroInternational	Ligier JS P320			7	13				
	(United Kingdom) #5 RLR M Sport	Ligier JS P320			9	17				
	(Poland) #8 Team Virage	Ligier JS P320			12	14				
	(United Kingdom) #4 Nielsen Racing	Ligier JS P320			16	27				
	(Italy) #31 EuroInternational	Ligier JS P320			19	Ret				
	(Poland) #76 Team Virage	Ligier JS P320			24	28				
	(Luxembourg) #3 DKR Engineering	Duqueine M30 - D08			33	26				
	(Switzerland) #64 Racing Spirit of Léman	Ligier JS P320			34	31				
	(Switzerland) #68 Haegeli by T2 Racing	Duqueine M30 - D08			35	32				
Pos.	Team	Chassis	BAR (Spain)	LEC (France)	LMS (France)		SPA (Belgium)	MUG (Italy)	POR (Portugal)	Points

Key
Colour	Result
Gold	Race winner
Silver	2nd place
Bronze	3rd place
Green	Points finish
Blue	Non-points finish
Blue	Non-classified finish (NC)
Purple	Did not finish (Ret)
Black	Disqualified (DSQ)
Black	Excluded (EX)
White	Did not start (DNS)
White	Race cancelled (C)
White	Withdrew (WD)
Blank	Did not participate

**Bold** – Pole

Italics – Fastest Lap

=== GT3 Drivers Championship ===
Pos.	Driver	Team	BAR (Spain)	LEC (France)	LMS (France)		SPA (Belgium)	MUG (Italy)	POR (Portugal)	Points
1	(Italy) Alessandro Balzan	(Italy) AF Corse	**1**	1	2	2	2	1	**1**	133.5
1	(United States) Matt Kurzejewski	(Italy) AF Corse	**1**	1	2	2	2	1	**1**	133.5
2	(Italy) Riccardo Agostini	(Italy) AF Corse	3	7	3	6	1	2	2	91.5
2	(Brazil) Custodio Toledo	(Italy) AF Corse	3	7	3	6	1	2	2	91.5
3	(United Kingdom) Andrew Gilbert	(Switzerland) Kessel Racing	2	3	14	9	3	8	4	69.5
3	(Spain) Fran Rueda	(Switzerland) Kessel Racing	2	3	14	9	3	8	4	69.5
4	(United Kingdom) Nick Jones	(Denmark) High Class Racing	5	5	6	3	4	3	5	66.5
5	(Italy) David Fumanelli	(Switzerland) Kessel Racing	4	4	1	**14**	7	6	3	64.5
5	(France) Frédéric Jousset	(Switzerland) Kessel Racing	4	4	1	**14**	7	6	3	64.5
6	(Switzerland) Karen Gaillard	(Italy) Iron Dames	7	**2**	7	16	Ret	5	7	43
6	(France) Célia Martin	(Italy) Iron Dames	7	**2**	7	16	Ret	5	7	43
7	(Germany) Sven Müller	(Denmark) High Class Racing			6	3		3	5	34.5
8	(Switzerland) Claude Bovet	(United Kingdom) Blackthorn		9	4	15	6	9	8	22
9	(United Kingdom) Scott Malvern	(Denmark) High Class Racing	5	5						20
10	(Australia) Martin Berry	(United Kingdom) Blackthorn			10	1				16.5
10	(United Kingdom) Lorcan Hanafin	(United Kingdom) Blackthorn			10	1				16.5
11	(United Kingdom) Darren Malkin	(United Kingdom) Steller Motorsport	6	6						16
12	(United Kingdom) Ross Kaiser	(United Kingdom) Blackthorn						**7**	6	15
12	(United Kingdom) James Swift	(United Kingdom) Blackthorn						**7**	6	15
13	(United Kingdom) Andrew Bentley	(United Kingdom) Steller Motorsport					**Ret**	4		13
14	(Germany) Jörg Dreisow	(Germany) Proton Huber Competition		8	16	13	9	10	10	13
14	(Germany) Manuel Lauck	(Germany) Proton Huber Competition		8	16	13	9	10	10	13
15	(United Kingdom) David McDonald	(United Kingdom) Blackthorn		9	4	15		9	8	12
16	(Germany) Nico Menzel	(Denmark) High Class Racing					4			12
17	(United Kingdom) Sennan Fielding	(United Kingdom) Steller Motorsport						4		12
18	(United Kingdom) Darren Turner	(United Kingdom) Blackthorn					6			10
19	(Spain) Marc Carol	(Spain) Biogas Motorsport		10	17	17	8	DSQ	9	9
19	(Spain) Josep Mayola	(Spain) Biogas Motorsport		10	17	17	8	DSQ	9	9
20	(Germany) Alex Aka	(United Kingdom) Steller Motorsport	6							8
21	(United Kingdom) Kiern Jewiss	(United Kingdom) Steller Motorsport		6						8
22	(United Kingdom) Rory Butcher	(United Kingdom) Steller Motorsport			12	11				5
22	(United Kingdom) Dominic Paul	(United Kingdom) Steller Motorsport			12	11				5
23	(United Kingdom) James Walker	(United Kingdom) Steller Motorsport					**Ret**			1
Pos.	Driver	Team	BAR (Spain)	LEC (France)	LMS (France)		SPA (Belgium)	MUG (Italy)	POR (Portugal)	Points

=== GT3 Teams Championship ===
Pos.	Team	Car	BAR (Spain)	LEC (France)	LMS (France)		SPA (Belgium)	MUG (Italy)	POR (Portugal)	Points
1	(Italy) #51 AF Corse	Ferrari 296 GT3	**1**	1	2	2	2	1	**1**	133.5
2	(Italy) #88 AF Corse	Ferrari 296 GT3	3	7	3	6	1	2	2	91.5
3	(Switzerland) #74 Kessel Racing	Ferrari 296 GT3	2	3	14	9	3	8	4	69.5
4	(Denmark) #18 High Class Racing	Porsche 911 GT3 R (992)	5	5	6	3	4	3	5	66.5
5	(Switzerland) #12 Kessel Racing	Ferrari 296 GT3	4	4	1	**14**	7	6	3	64.5
6	(Italy) #83 Iron Dames	Lamborghini Huracán GT3 Evo 2	7	**2**	7	16	11	5	7	43
7	(United Kingdom) #24 Steller Motorsport	Audi R8 LMS Evo II	6	6	12	11	**10**	4		34
8	(United Kingdom) #90 Blackthorn	Aston Martin Vantage AMR GT3 Evo			10	1		**7**	6	31.5
9	(United Kingdom) #91 Blackthorn	Aston Martin Vantage AMR GT3 Evo		9	4	15	6	9	8	22
10	(Germany) #73 Proton Huber Competition	Porsche 911 GT3 R (992)	WD	8	16	7	9	10	10	13
11	(Spain) #23 Biogas Motorsport	Ferrari 296 GT3	WD	10	17	17	8	DSQ	9	9
Pos.	Team	Car	BAR (Spain)	LEC (France)	LMS (France)		SPA (Belgium)	MUG (Italy)	POR (Portugal)	Points
