= Martin Berry =

Australian racing driver (born 1977)

- Berry at Silverstone Circuit in 2026.
- Nationality: (Australia) Australian
- Born: Martin Edward Berry; 9 June 1977 (age 49) Melbourne, Australia
- Categorisation: FIA Bronze

Championship titles
- 2017: Ferrari Challenge Asia Pacific – Trofeo Pirelli 458

Martin Edward Berry (born 9 June 1977 in Melbourne) is an Australian businessman and racing driver who last competed for Iron Lynx in the LMGT3 class of the FIA World Endurance Championship.

Born in Melbourne, Berry moved to South Korea during his time as a banker before founding Gong Cha Korea in 2012 and buying Gong Cha outright in 2017 to expand it worldwide. During Gong Cha's global expansion, Berry relocated to Singapore and began his racing career the same year. Racing with a Singaporean licence since then, Berry won the Ferrari Challenge Asia Pacific series in the Trofeo Pirelli 458 class in 2017 and is a Michelin Le Mans Cup race winner.

== Business career ==
Berry initially worked for Standard Chartered Bank in Singapore and later South Korea, but left the company in late 2012 to establish Gong Cha Korea. Five years later, Berry bought the main company and founded Gong Cha Global, as he expanded the company's operations abroad as its chairman. Berry is also the founder of Launcho Ventures and BeMe Wellness.

== Racing career ==
Berry made his racing debut in 2017, by competing in the Trofeo Pirelli 458 class of the Ferrari Challenge Asia-Pacific series. After winning ten out of the 13 races contested, Berry clinched the title two rounds early and also was runner-up in the same class, at that year's Finali Mondiali.

Returning to Ferrari Challenge Asia Pacific for 2018, Berry finished fifth in the Trofeo Pirelli Am class. At the end of 2018, Berry made a one-off outing in the 24H GT Series for HB Racing at the final round of the season at Circuit of the Americas, before joining Absolute Racing for the last round of the Audi R8 LMS Cup at Sepang, finishing fifth and eighth in the two races.

Berry transitioned over to Europe for 2019, joining Rinaldi Racing to compete in the Am class of the Blancpain GT Series Endurance Cup alongside Pierre Ehret, José Manuel Balbiani and Rory Penttinen. In his only season in the championship, Berry scored a class podium at Paul Ricard and finished seventh in the Am standings. During 2019, Berry also returned to the 24H GT Series, competing for Rinaldi Racing in the Mugello and Spa rounds, whilst also making one-off appearances for Car Collection Motorsport and Toksport WRT at Dubai and Circuit of the Americas respectively.

In 2020, Berry was set to compete with Optimum Motorsport in both the British GT Championship and GT World Challenge Europe Endurance Cup, but both deals fell through, leaving him on the sidelines as he was stuck in Singapore.

After spending two years out of racing, Berry entered the ST-X class of the 2022 Super Taikyu Series with his team, Grid Motorsport alongside Haruki Kurosawa, Shinichi Takagi, Daisuke Yamawaki and later Shaun Thong. Competing in all but one races for his team, Berry took pole for the Fuji 24 Hours on debut and finished second in the longest race of the season, before winning at Sugo and Motegi on his way to second in the ST-X points.

Berry made his return to GT3 competition in 2023, joining Bullitt Racing to compete in the Asian Le Mans Series alongside Aston Martin juniors Jacob Riegel and Valentin Hasse-Clot. After taking a best result of 13th in the season-ending race at Yas Marina, Berry joined JMW Motorsport to compete in the European Le Mans Series' LMGTE class alongside Lorcan Hanafin and Jon Lancaster, driving a Ferrari 488 GTE Evo on his European return. In the six-race season, Berry took pole on debut and finished third in Barcelona, before taking another pole at Aragón and finishing sixth in the standings with two more top fives to his name.

Staying in the European Le Mans Series for 2024 in the rebranded GT3 class, Berry joined Grid Motorsport by TF alongside Hanafin and Jonathan Adam, switching to an Aston Martin Vantage AMR GT3 Evo for his sophomore season in the series. In the penultimate round at Mugello, Berry scored his lone podium of the season by finishing second, which contributed to his seventh place in the standings at season's end. During 2024, Berry also competed in the Road to Le Mans alongside Hanafin in the GT3 class for Blackthorn. In the two races on the 24 Hours of Le Mans' support bill, Berry finished tenth in race one and won race two.

Berry remained in the now-LMGT3 class of the European Le Mans Series for 2025, switching to Iron Lynx for his third season in the series as the team switched from Lamborghini to Mercedes-AMG. Alongside his ELMS commitments, Berry also joined EBM to race in GT World Challenge Asia. In ELMS, Berry scored two second-place finishes at Le Castellet and Spa to end the season seventh in points, whereas in the latter, Berry raced in select events, scoring an Am class win at Buriram to end the season sixth in points. During 2025, Berry also made his debut in the FIA World Endurance Championship as he replaced Christian Ried ahead of the 6 Hours of Spa-Francorchamps. Competing in the last six races of the season, Berry scored his maiden series podium at the 8 Hours of Bahrain by finishing second in LMGT3.

The following year, Berry remained with Iron Lynx for his first full season in the FIA World Endurance Championship alongside Maxime Martin and Rui Andrade. In his first full season with the team, Berry took a best result of sixth three times to finish the year 17th in LMGT3 points. During 2026, Berry also made a mid-season return to the ELMS with Porsche-affiliated Proton Competition, taking three podiums in four races and taking fifth in the LMGT3 standings.

== Personal life ==
Berry is married to Gong Cha Korea co-founder Kim Yeo-jin, with whom he has one son, Joshua, who is also a racing driver.

== Racing record ==
=== Racing career summary ===
Season	Series	Team	Races	Wins	Poles	F/Laps	Podiums	Points	Position
2017	Ferrari Challenge Asia Pacific – Trofeo Pirelli 458	Italia Auto Singapore	13	10	11	11	11	242	**1st**
2017	Finali Mondiali – 458 Challenge	Italia Auto Singapore	1	0	0	0	1	—N/a	**2nd**
2018	Ferrari Challenge Asia Pacific – Trofeo Pirelli Am	ItalAuto Singapore	14	0	0	0	2	92	5th
2018	Audi R8 LMS Cup	Absolute Racing	2	0	0	0	0	14	14th
2018	24H GT Continental Series – A6 Am	HB Racing	1	0	0	0	0	27	NC
2018	Finali Mondiali – Trofeo Pirelli Pro-Am	Italia Auto Singapore	0	0	0	0	0	—N/a	DNS
2019	Blancpain GT Series Endurance Cup	Rinaldi Racing	5	0	0	0	0	0	NC
2019	Blancpain GT Series Endurance Cup – Am	Rinaldi Racing	5	0	0	0	1	58	7th
2019	24H GT European Series – A6 Am	Rinaldi Racing	2	0	0	0	0	26	11th
2019	24H GT Continental Series – A6 Am	Car Collection Motorsport	1	0	0	0	0	9	NC
2019	24H GT Continental Series – A6 Am	Toksport WRT	1	0	0	0	0	9	NC
2022	Super Taikyu – ST-X	Grid Motorsport	6	2	1	0	3	127‡	**2nd‡**
2022	Prototype Cup Germany	Rinaldi Racing	2	0	0	0	0	20	16th
2023	Asian Le Mans Series – GT	Bullitt Racing	4	0	0	0	0	0	21st
2023	European Le Mans Series – LMGTE	JMW Motorsport	6	0	2	0	1	47	6th
2024	European Le Mans Series – GT3	Grid Motorsport by TF	6	0	0	0	1	54	7th
2024	Le Mans Cup – GT3	Blackthorn	2	1	0	0	1	16.5	10th
2025	European Le Mans Series – LMGT3	Iron Lynx	6	0	3	0	2	51	7th
2025	FIA World Endurance Championship – LMGT3	Iron Lynx	6	0	0	0	1	39	13th
2025	GT World Challenge Asia	EBM	6	0	0	0	0	0	NC
2025	GT World Challenge Asia – Am	EBM	6	1	1	0	5	94	6th
2025–26	Asian Le Mans Series – GT	EBM	2	0	0	0	0	6	23rd
2026	FIA World Endurance Championship – LMGT3	Iron Lynx	8	0	0	0	0	31	17th
2026	European Le Mans Series – LMGT3	Proton Competition	4	0	0	0	3	58	5th
2026–27	Asian Le Mans Series – GT3	Proton Competition						*	*

=== Complete GT World Challenge Europe results ===
==== GT World Challenge Europe Endurance Cup ====
Year	Team	Car	Class	1	2	3	4	5	6	7	Pos.	Points
2019	Rinaldi Racing	Ferrari 488 GT3	Am	MON; 33	SIL; Ret	LEC; 31	SPA; 6H; 47	SPA; 12H; 44	SPA; 24H; 41	CAT; 27	7th	58

=== Complete Asian Le Mans Series results ===
(key) (Races in bold indicate pole position) (Races in italics indicate fastest lap)

Year	Team	Class	Car	Engine	1	2	3	4	5	6	Pos.	Points
2023	Bullitt Racing	GT	Aston Martin Vantage AMR GT3	Aston Martin M177 4.0 L Turbo V8	DUB; 1 Ret	DUB; 2; 17	ABU; 1 Ret	ABU; 2; 13			21st	0
2025–26	Earl Bamber Motorsport	GT	Aston Martin Vantage AMR GT3 Evo	Aston Martin M177 4.0 L Turbo V8	SEP; 1; 7	SEP; 2; 14	DUB; 1	DUB; 2	ABU; 1	ABU; 2	23rd	6

=== Complete European Le Mans Series results ===
(key) (Races in bold indicate pole position) (Races in italics indicate fastest lap)

Year	Entrant	Class	Chassis	Engine	1	2	3	4	5	6	Rank	Points
2023	JMW Motorsport	LMGTE	Ferrari 488 GTE Evo	Ferrari F154CB 3.9 L Turbo V8	**CAT**; 3	LEC; 6	**ARA**; 5	**SPA**; Ret	ALG; 11	ALG; 4	6th	47
2024	Grid Motorsport by TF	LMGT3	Aston Martin Vantage AMR GT3 Evo	Aston Martin M177 4.0 L Turbo V8	CAT; 7	LEC; 7	IMO; 5	SPA; 5	MUG; 2	ALG; 8	7th	54
2025	Iron Lynx	LMGT3	Mercedes-AMG GT3 Evo	Mercedes-AMG M159 6.2 L V8	**CAT**; Ret	LEC; 2	**IMO**; Ret	**SPA**; 2	SIL; Ret	ALG; 4	7th	51
2026	Proton Competition	LMGT3	Porsche 911 GT3 R (992.2)	Porsche M97/80 4.2 L Flat-6	CAT	LEC	IMO; 3	SPA; 2	SIL; 3	ALG; 5	5th	58

=== Complete GT World Challenge Asia results ===
(key) (Races in bold indicate pole position) (Races in italics indicate fastest lap)

Year	Team	Car	Class	1	2	3	4	5	6	7	8	9	10	11	12	DC	Points
2025	EBM	Mercedes-AMG GT3 Evo	Am	SEP; 1; 3	SEP; 2; 2	MAN; 1	MAN; 2	BUR; 1; 1	**BUR**; **2** Ret	FUJ; 1	FUJ; 2	OKA; 1; 2	OKA; 2; 2	BEI; 1	BEI; 2	6th	94

=== Complete FIA World Endurance Championship results ===
(key) (Races in bold indicate pole position; races in italics indicate fastest lap)

Year	Entrant	Class	Chassis	Engine	1	2	3	4	5	6	7	8	Rank	Points
2025	Iron Lynx	LMGT3	Mercedes-AMG GT3 Evo	Mercedes-AMG M159 6.2 L V8	QAT	IMO	SPA; 11	LMS; 8	SÃO; Ret	COA; Ret	FUJ; 8	BHR; 2	13th	39
2026	Iron Lynx	LMGT3	Mercedes-AMG GT3 Evo	Mercedes-AMG M159 6.2 L V8	IMO; Ret	SPA; 10	LMS; Ret	SÃO; 6	COA; 6	FUJ; Ret	CAT; 6	MNZ; 7	17th	31

^{*} Season still in progress.

=== Complete 24 Hours of Le Mans results ===
Year	Team	Co-Drivers	Car	Class	Laps	Pos.	Class Pos.
2025	(Italy) Iron Lynx	(Netherlands) Lin Hodenius (Belgium) Maxime Martin	Mercedes-AMG GT3 Evo	LMGT3	337	44th	12th
2026	(Italy) Iron Lynx	(Angola) Rui Andrade (Belgium) Maxime Martin	Mercedes-AMG GT3 Evo	LMGT3	65	DNF	DNF
