= Matt Kurzejewski =

American racecar driver

- Nationality: (United States) American
- Born: Matthew Kurzejewski; June 27, 1991 (age 35) Mansfield, Pennsylvania, U.S.

European Le Mans Series career
- Debut season: 2026
- Current team: Proton Competition
- Categorisation: FIA Silver (until 2023); FIA Bronze (2024–)
- Car number: 75
- Starts: 3
- Wins: 1
- Podiums: 1
- Poles: 0
- Fastest laps: 0
- Best finish: TBD in 2026 (LMGT3)

NASCAR FedEx Freight Truck Series career
- 2 races run over 2 years
- 2013 position: 79th
- Best finish: 79th (2013)
- First race: 2013 Fan Appreciation 200 Presented by New Holland (Iowa)
- Last race: 2013 Smith's 350 (Las Vegas)
Wins	Top tens	Poles
0	0	0

Previous series
- 2024 2023 2023 2023 2022–2023 2013–2016 2009, 2013 2008: Le Mans Cup; Ferrari Challenge World Final; Ferrari Challenge Europe; Italian GT Championship; Ferrari Challenge North America; ARCA Racing Series; NASCAR Camping World Truck Series; ARCA Re/Max Series

Championship titles
- 2024 2023: Le Mans Cup; Ferrari Challenge North America

Awards
- 2015: ARCA Superspeedway Championship
- Statistics up to date as of July 27, 2026.

Matthew Kurzejewski (born June 27, 1991) is an American racing driver who competes in the LMGT3 class of the European Le Mans Series with Proton Competition.

== Stock car racing career ==
After getting many good finishes driving part-time for his own team for a few years, he signed with the No. 52 team for Ken Schrader Racing to run his first full season in ARCA in 2016. They also picked up sponsorship from Menards (as well as Ansell), which moved over to KSR after sponsoring Frank Kimmel since 2009. They replaced Federated Auto Parts as the team's full season sponsor. That year marked the first time the No. 52 car ran with one driver for the full season for the first time in over three years. Even though he did not win any races, Kurzejewski earned a third-place finish in points.

== Sports car racing career ==
=== Le Mans Cup ===
Following two years of racing in Ferrari Challenge, Kurzejewski moved up to GT3 machinery in 2024, signing with AF Corse to compete in the Le Mans Cup. Alessandro Balzan joined the team to be Kurzejewski's teammate. He and Balzan had a very successful season, winning four out of seven races and having a podium place finish in every single race. Kurzejewski won the championship, his second straight following his 2023 Ferrari Challenge North America title.

=== European Le Mans Series ===
After not racing in 2025, Kurzejewski signed with Proton Competition to compete in the LMGT3 class of the 2026 European Le Mans Series. Richard Lietz and Tom Sargent joined the team as Kurzejewski's teammates. In his championship debut at Barcelona, Kurzejewski qualified third. During the race, he took the car to second in class before handing it off to Lietz. Lietz fought for the lead with the No. 61 Iron Lynx of Julian Hanses. The team eventually took the lead of the race with Sargent at the helm. Kurzejewski and company took home the win, allowing Kurzejewski to win on debut.

== Racing record ==
=== Racing career summary ===
Season	Series	Team	Races	Wins	Poles	F/Laps	Podiums	Points	Position
2008	ARCA Re/Max Series	K Automotive Racing	1	0	0	0	0	390	65th
2009	NASCAR Camping World East Series	Kurzejewski Motorsports Inc.	9	0	0	0	0	906	15th
2013	ARCA Racing Series	Kurzejewski Motorsports Inc.	2	0	0	0	0	370	68th
2013	NASCAR Camping World Truck Series	SS-Green Light Racing	2	0	0	0	0	37	53rd
2014	ARCA Racing Series	Kurzejewski Motorsports Inc.	2	0	0	0	0	220	72nd
2015	ARCA Racing Series	Kurzejewski Motorsports Inc.	9	0	0	0	1	1755	17th
2016	ARCA Racing Series	Ken Schrader Racing	20	0	0	0	1	4585	**3rd**
2022	Ferrari Challenge North America – Trofeo Pirelli Pro	Ferrari of Westlake	6	0	0	0	3	35	4th
2023	Ferrari Challenge Europe – Trofeo Pirelli Pro-Am	Ferrari Beverly Hills	1	1	1	1	1	23	13th
2023	Italian GT Championship – GT Cup Pro-Am	Pellin Racing	2	1	0	0	1	?	?
2023	Ferrari Challenge World Final – Trofeo Pirelli	Ferrari Beverly Hills	1	0	0	0	0	–	N/A
2023	Ferrari Challenge North America – Trofeo Pirelli	Ferrari Beverly Hills	14	7	7	4	12	175	**1st**
2024	Le Mans Cup – GT3	AF Corse	7	4	2	2	7	133.5	**1st**
2026	European Le Mans Series – LMGT3	Proton Competition	6	2	0	1	2	86	**2nd**
2026-27	Asian Le Mans Series - GT3	Proton Competition							

=== NASCAR ===
(key) (Bold – Pole position awarded by qualifying time. Italics – Pole position earned by points standings or practice time. * – Most laps led.)

==== Camping World Truck Series ====
NASCAR Camping World Truck Series results
Year	Team	No.	Make	1	2	3	4	5	6	7	8	9	10	11	12	13	14	15	16	17	18	19	20	21	22	NCWTC	Pts	Ref
2013	SS-Green Light Racing	81	Chevy	DAY	MAR	CAR	KAN	CLT	DOV	TEX	KEN	IOW	ELD	POC	MCH	BRI	MSP	IOW; 27	CHI	LVS; 24	TAL	MAR	TEX	PHO	HOM	53rd	37	

==== Camping World East Series ====
Camping World East Series results
Year	Team	No.	Make	1	2	3	4	5	6	7	8	9	10	11	NCWEC	Pts	Ref
2009	Kurzejewski Motorsports Inc.	10	Dodge	GRE; 20	TRI; 25		SBO; 18								15th	906	
2009	Kurzejewski Motorsports Inc.	07	Toyota			IOW; 13									15th	906	
2009	Kurzejewski Motorsports Inc.	10	Toyota					GLN; 17	NHA	TMP					15th	906	
2009	Kurzejewski Motorsports Inc.	10	Ford								ADI; 17	LRP; 14	NHA; 35	DOV; 28	15th	906	

=== ARCA Racing Series ===
(key) (Bold – Pole position awarded by qualifying time. Italics – Pole position earned by points standings or practice time. * – Most laps led.)

ARCA Racing Series results
Year	Team	No.	Make	1	2	3	4	5	6	7	8	9	10	11	12	13	14	15	16	17	18	19	20	21	ARSC	Pts	Ref
2008	K Automotive Racing	00	Ford	DAY	SLM	IOW	KAN	CAR	KEN	TOL	POC	MCH	CAY	KEN	BLN	POC	NSH	ISF	DSF	CHI	SLM	NJE	TAL	TOL; 18	65th	390	
2013	Kurzejewski Motorsports Inc.	54	Dodge	DAY; 9	MOB	SLM	TAL; 10	TOL	ELK	POC	MCH	ROA	WIN	CHI	NJE	POC	BLN	ISF	MAD	DSF	IOW	SLM	KEN	KAN	68th	370	
2014	Kurzejewski Motorsports Inc.	54	Dodge	DAY; 32	MOB	SLM																			72nd	220	
2014	Kurzejewski Motorsports Inc.	66	Dodge				TAL; 16	TOL	NJE	POC	MCH	ELK	WIN	CHI	IRP	POC	BLN	ISF	MAD	DSF	SLM	KEN	KAN		72nd	220	
2015	Kurzejewski Motorsports Inc.	54	Chevy	DAY; 7	MOB	NSH	SLM	TAL; 6	TOL	NJE	POC; 5	MCH; 5	CHI; 6	WIN	IOW; 15	IRP	POC; 3	BLN	ISF	DSF	SLM	KEN; 9	KAN; 9		17th	1755	
2016	Ken Schrader Racing	52	Toyota	DAY; 29	NSH; 13	SLM; 9		TOL; 5		POC; 13	MCH; 8	MAD; 7	WIN; 4	IOW; 6	IRP; 16	POC; 11	BLN; 3	ISF; 13	DSF; 13	SLM; 7	CHI; 20	KEN; 5	KAN; 6		3rd	4585	
2016	Ken Schrader Racing	52	Chevy				TAL; 8		NJE; 8																3rd	4585	

=== Complete Le Mans Cup results ===
(key) (Races in bold indicate pole position; results in italics indicate fastest lap)

Year	Entrant	Class	Chassis	Engine	1	2	3	4	5	6	7	Rank	Points
2024	AF Corse	GT3	Ferrari 296 GT3	Ferrari F163 3.0 L Turbo V6	**BAR**; 1	LEC; 1	LMS; 1; 2	LMS; 2; 2	SPA; 2	MUG; 1	**POR**; 1	1st	133.5

=== Complete European Le Mans Series results ===
(key) (Races in bold indicate pole position; results in italics indicate fastest lap)

Year	Entrant	Class	Chassis	Engine	1	2	3	4	5	6	Rank	Points
2026	Proton Competition	LMGT3	Porsche 911 GT3 R (992.2)	Porsche M97/80 4.2 L Flat-6	CAT; 1	LEC; 7	IMO; 4	SPA; 5	SIL; 6	ALG; 1	2nd	86

* Season still in progress.
