= 2026 4 Hours of Silverstone =

Endurance sportscar racing event

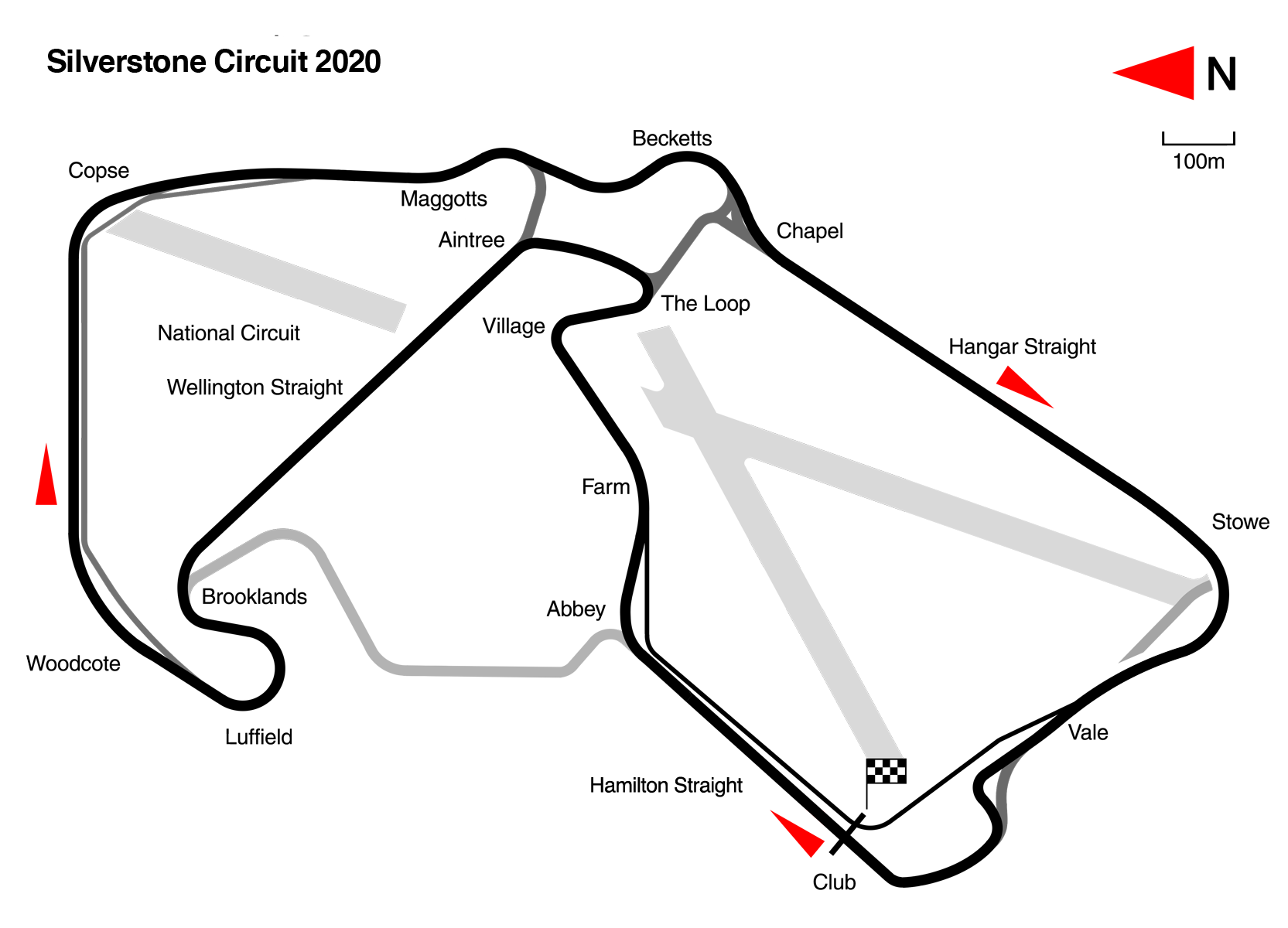
The layout of Silverstone Circuit

The 2026 4 Hours of Silverstone was an endurance sportscar racing event, held between 11 and 13 September 2026 at Silverstone Circuit in Silverstone, Northamptonshire, England. It was the fifth of six rounds of the 2026 European Le Mans Series season, and the ninth running of the event as part of the championship.

== Entry list ==
The provisional entry list was published on 30 August 2026 and consisted of 47 entries across 4 categories – 11 in LMP2, 12 in LMP2 Pro-Am, 10 in LMP3, and 14 in LMGT3.

== Schedule ==
Date	Time (local: BST)	Event
Friday, 11 September	11:55	Free Practice 1
Friday, 11 September	16:15	Bronze Driver Collective Test
Saturday, 12 September	9:55	Free Practice 2
Saturday, 12 September	14:55	Qualifying – LMGT3
Saturday, 12 September	15:18	Qualifying – LMP3
Saturday, 12 September	15:41	Qualifying – LMP2 Pro-Am
Saturday, 12 September	16:04	Qualifying – LMP2
Sunday, 13 September	12:00	Race

== Qualifying ==
Qualifying started at 144:55 BST on Saturday, with four sessions of fifteen minutes each, one session for each class.

=== Qualifying results ===
Pole position winners in each class are marked in bold.

Pos	Class	No.	Team	Driver	Time	Gap	Grid
1	**LMP2**	**43**	**(Poland) Inter Europol Competition**	**(France) Tom Dillmann**	**1:43.279**	—	1
2	LMP2	37	(Switzerland) CLX Motorsport	(France) Adrien Closmenil	1:43.380	+0.101	2
3	LMP2	29	(France) Forestier Racing by Panis	(United Kingdom) Oliver Gray	1:43.401	+0.122	3
4	LMP2	34	(Poland) Inter Europol Competition	(France) Reshad de Gerus	1:43.448	+0.169	4
5	LMP2	18	(France) IDEC Sport	(Germany) Laurents Hörr	1:43.649	+0.370	5
6	LMP2	25	(Portugal) Algarve Pro Racing	(United Kingdom) Jake Hughes	1:43.854	+0.575	6
7	LMP2	28	(France) IDEC Sport	(Netherlands) Job van Uitert	1:44.397	+1.118	7
8	LMP2	10	(United Kingdom) Vector Sport	(Brazil) Pietro Fittipaldi	1:44.401	+1.122	8
9	LMP2	24	(United Kingdom) Nielsen Racing	(United Kingdom) Jack Aitken	1:44.418	+1.139	9
10	LMP2	22	(United Kingdom) United Autosports	(United Kingdom) Ben Hanley	1:44.722	+1.443	10
11	LMP2	9	(Germany) Proton Competition	(United Kingdom) Sebastian Priaulx	1:45.240	+1.961	11
12	**LMP2 Pro/Am**	**14**	**(France) TDS Racing**	**(United States) Steven Thomas**	**1:45.611**	**+2.332**	12
13	LMP2 Pro/Am	47	(Switzerland) CLX Motorsport	(Greece) Georgios Kolovos	1:45.884	+2.605	13
14	LMP2 Pro/Am	30	(France) Duqueine Team	(Italy) Giorgio Roda	1:46.342	+3.063	14
15	LMP2 Pro/Am	99	(United States) AO by TF	(United States) P. J. Hyett	1:46.545	+3.266	15
16	LMP2 Pro/Am	20	(Portugal) Algarve Pro Racing	(Denmark) Michael Jensen	1:46.643	+3.364	16
17	LMP2 Pro/Am	3	(Luxembourg) DKR Engineering	(Belgium) Jean Glorieux	1:46.775	+3.496	17
18	LMP2 Pro/Am	19	(United Arab Emirates) Rossa Racing by Virage	(United States) John Falb	1:47.066	+3.787	18
19	LMP2 Pro/Am	7	(United Kingdom) Vector Sport	(Denmark) Jens Reno Møller	1:47.200	+3.921	19
20	LMP2 Pro/Am	83	(Italy) AF Corse	(France) François Perrodo	1:47.570	+4.291	20
21	LMP2 Pro/Am	88	(Germany) Proton Competition	(Austria) Horst Felbermayr Jr.	1:48.450	+5.171	21
22	LMP2 Pro/Am	21	(United Kingdom) United Autosports	(Brazil) Daniel Schneider	1:48.483	+5.204	22
23	LMP2 Pro/Am	27	(United Kingdom) Nielsen Racing	(Greece) Kriton Lendoudis	1:50.155	+6.876	23
24	**LMP3**	**17**	**(Switzerland) CLX Motorsport**	**(France) Louis Iglesias**	**1:53.144**	**+9.865**	24
25	LMP3	85	(France) R-ace GP	(Germany) Hugo Schwarze	1:53.213	+9.934	25
26	LMP3	8	(Poland) Team Virage	(Italy) Matteo Quintarelli	1:53.646	+10.367	26
27	LMP3	5	(Germany) Rinaldi Racing	(Denmark) Mikkel Gaarde Pedersen	1:53.986	+10.707	27
28	LMP3	11	(Italy) EuroInternational	(Netherlands) Max van der Snel	1:54.478	+11.199	28
29	LMP3	68	(France) M Racing	(United Kingdom) Alfie Briggs	1:54.612	+11.333	29
30	LMP3	13	(Poland) Inter Europol Competition	(Colombia) Henry Cubides Olarte	1:54.623	+11.344	30
31	LMP3	35	(France) Ultimate	(Denmark) Sebastian Gravlund	1:54.879	+11.600	31
32	LMP3	31	(France) Racing Spirit of Léman	(Germany) Lenny Ried	1:54.955	+11.676	32
33	LMP3	4	(Luxembourg) DKR Engineering	(France) Romain Favre	1:55.054	+11.775	33
34	**LMGT3**	**62**	**Team Qatar by Iron Lynx**	**(Qatar) Abdulla Al-Khelaifi**	**2:00.011**	**+16.732**	34
35	LMGT3	33	(United Kingdom) TF Sport	(United States) Blake McDonald	2:00.262	+16.983	35
36	LMGT3	59	(France) Racing Spirit of Léman	(France) François Hériau	2:00.391	+17.112	39
37	LMGT3	55	(Switzerland) Spirit of Race	(United Kingdom) Duncan Cameron	2:00.657	+17.378	36
38	LMGT3	57	(Switzerland) Kessel Racing	(Japan) Takeshi Kimura	2:00.841	+17.562	37
39	LMGT3	63	(Italy) Iron Lynx	(Zimbabwe) Ameerh Naran	2:00.941	+17.662	38
40	LMGT3	75	(Germany) Proton Competition	(United States) Matt Kurzejewski	2:00.970	+17.691	40
41	LMGT3	54	(Denmark) High Class Racing	(Germany) Max Moritz	2:01.065	+17.786	41
42	LMGT3	77	(Germany) Proton Competition	(Australia) Martin Berry	2:01.318	+18.039	42
43	LMGT3	74	(Switzerland) Kessel Racing	(United Kingdom) Andrew Gilbert	2:01.484	+18.205	43
44	LMGT3	51	(Italy) AF Corse	(France) Charles-Henri Samani	2:01.990	+18.711	44
45	LMGT3	23	(United Kingdom) United Autosports	(United Kingdom) Michael Birch	2:02.073	+18.794	45
46	LMGT3	86	(United Kingdom) GR Racing	(United Kingdom) Michael Wainwright	2:02.414	+19.135	46
WD	LMGT3	50	(Italy) Richard Mille AF Corse	(Brazil) Custodio Toledo	WD		WD

== Race ==
=== Race results ===
The minimum number of laps for classification (70% of overall winning car's distance) was 74 laps. Class winners are in bold and ‡.

Pos	Class	No	Team	Drivers	Chassis	Tyre	Laps	Time/Retired
Pos	Class	No	Team	Drivers	Engine	Tyre	Laps	Time/Retired
1	**LMP2**	**25**	**(Portugal) Algarve Pro Racing**	**(United Kingdom) Ben Barnicoat** **(United Kingdom) Jake Hughes** **(Liechtenstein) Matthias Kaiser**	**Oreca 07**	G	**105**	**4:00:34.406‡**
1	**LMP2**	**25**	**(Portugal) Algarve Pro Racing**	**(United Kingdom) Ben Barnicoat** **(United Kingdom) Jake Hughes** **(Liechtenstein) Matthias Kaiser**	**Gibson GK428 4.2 L V8**	G	**105**	**4:00:34.406‡**
2	**LMP2 Pro-Am**	**14**	**(France) TDS Racing**	**(United States) Scott Huffaker** **(France) Sami Meguetounif** **(United States) Steven Thomas**	**Oreca 07**	G	**105**	**+17.995‡**
2	**LMP2 Pro-Am**	**14**	**(France) TDS Racing**	**(United States) Scott Huffaker** **(France) Sami Meguetounif** **(United States) Steven Thomas**	**Gibson GK428 4.2 L V8**	G	**105**	**+17.995‡**
3	LMP2 Pro-Am	21	(United Kingdom) United Autosports	(United Kingdom) Oliver Jarvis (Japan) Marino Sato (Brazil) Daniel Schneider	Oreca 07	G	105	+26.737
3	LMP2 Pro-Am	21	(United Kingdom) United Autosports	(United Kingdom) Oliver Jarvis (Japan) Marino Sato (Brazil) Daniel Schneider	Gibson GK428 4.2 L V8	G	105	+26.737
4	LMP2	28	(France) IDEC Sport	(France) Paul-Loup Chatin (France) Paul Lafargue (Netherlands) Job van Uitert	Oreca 07	G	105	+29.789
4	LMP2	28	(France) IDEC Sport	(France) Paul-Loup Chatin (France) Paul Lafargue (Netherlands) Job van Uitert	Gibson GK428 4.2 L V8	G	105	+29.789
5	LMP2 Pro-Am	19	(United Arab Emirates) Rossa Racing by Virage	(Portugal) Manuel Espírito Santo (United States) John Falb (Netherlands) Rik Koen	Oreca 07	G	105	+31.142
5	LMP2 Pro-Am	19	(United Arab Emirates) Rossa Racing by Virage	(Portugal) Manuel Espírito Santo (United States) John Falb (Netherlands) Rik Koen	Gibson GK428 4.2 L V8	G	105	+31.142
6	LMP2	22	(United Kingdom) United Autosports	(United Kingdom) Ben Hanley (Australia) Griffin Peebles (Switzerland) Grégoire Saucy	Oreca 07	G	105	+32.692
6	LMP2	22	(United Kingdom) United Autosports	(United Kingdom) Ben Hanley (Australia) Griffin Peebles (Switzerland) Grégoire Saucy	Gibson GK428 4.2 L V8	G	105	+32.692
7	LMP2 Pro-Am	30	(France) Duqueine Team	(France) Doriane Pin (Italy) Giorgio Roda (Netherlands) Richard Verschoor	Oreca 07	G	105	+42.696
7	LMP2 Pro-Am	30	(France) Duqueine Team	(France) Doriane Pin (Italy) Giorgio Roda (Netherlands) Richard Verschoor	Gibson GK428 4.2 L V8	G	105	+42.696
8	LMP2 Pro-Am	47	(Switzerland) CLX Motorsport	(Austria) Ferdinand Habsburg (Greece) Georgios Kolovos (France) Charles Milesi	Oreca 07	G	105	+42.836
8	LMP2 Pro-Am	47	(Switzerland) CLX Motorsport	(Austria) Ferdinand Habsburg (Greece) Georgios Kolovos (France) Charles Milesi	Gibson GK428 4.2 L V8	G	105	+42.836
9	LMP2	24	(United Kingdom) Nielsen Racing	(United Kingdom) Jack Aitken (Israel) Roy Nissany (United Kingdom) Edward Pearson	Oreca 07	G	105	+43.755
9	LMP2	24	(United Kingdom) Nielsen Racing	(United Kingdom) Jack Aitken (Israel) Roy Nissany (United Kingdom) Edward Pearson	Gibson GK428 4.2 L V8	G	105	+43.755
10	LMP2 Pro-Am	99	(United States) AO by TF	(United States) Dane Cameron (Switzerland) Louis Delétraz (United States) P. J. Hyett	Oreca 07	G	105	+44.221
10	LMP2 Pro-Am	99	(United States) AO by TF	(United States) Dane Cameron (Switzerland) Louis Delétraz (United States) P. J. Hyett	Gibson GK428 4.2 L V8	G	105	+44.221
11	LMP2 Pro-Am	83	(Italy) AF Corse	(Italy) Antonio Fuoco (France) François Perrodo (France) Matthieu Vaxivière	Oreca 07	G	105	+52.647
11	LMP2 Pro-Am	83	(Italy) AF Corse	(Italy) Antonio Fuoco (France) François Perrodo (France) Matthieu Vaxivière	Gibson GK428 4.2 L V8	G	105	+52.647
12	LMP2 Pro-Am	7	(United Kingdom) Vector Sport	(Turkey) Cem Bölükbaşı (Spain) Lorenzo Fluxá (Denmark) Jens Reno Møller	Oreca 07	G	105	+53.249
12	LMP2 Pro-Am	7	(United Kingdom) Vector Sport	(Turkey) Cem Bölükbaşı (Spain) Lorenzo Fluxá (Denmark) Jens Reno Møller	Gibson GK428 4.2 L V8	G	105	+53.249
13	LMP2	37	(Switzerland) CLX Motorsport	(Mexico) Ian Aguilera (France) Adrien Closmenil (Denmark) Theodor Jensen	Oreca 07	G	105	+59.630
13	LMP2	37	(Switzerland) CLX Motorsport	(Mexico) Ian Aguilera (France) Adrien Closmenil (Denmark) Theodor Jensen	Gibson GK428 4.2 L V8	G	105	+59.630
14	LMP2 Pro-Am	3	(Luxembourg) DKR Engineering	(France) Macéo Capietto (Belgium) Jean Glorieux (France) Marlon Hernandez	Oreca 07	G	105	+1:01.467
14	LMP2 Pro-Am	3	(Luxembourg) DKR Engineering	(France) Macéo Capietto (Belgium) Jean Glorieux (France) Marlon Hernandez	Gibson GK428 4.2 L V8	G	105	+1:01.467
15	LMP2 Pro-Am	27	(United Kingdom) Nielsen Racing	(Australia) James Allen (Greece) Kriton Lendoudis (United Kingdom) Alex Quinn	Oreca 07	G	105	+1:28.174
15	LMP2 Pro-Am	27	(United Kingdom) Nielsen Racing	(Australia) James Allen (Greece) Kriton Lendoudis (United Kingdom) Alex Quinn	Gibson GK428 4.2 L V8	G	105	+1:28.174
16	LMP2 Pro-Am	20	(Portugal) Algarve Pro Racing	(Denmark) Malthe Jakobsen (Denmark) Michael Jensen (Italy) Enzo Trulli	Oreca 07	G	105	+1:30.634
16	LMP2 Pro-Am	20	(Portugal) Algarve Pro Racing	(Denmark) Malthe Jakobsen (Denmark) Michael Jensen (Italy) Enzo Trulli	Gibson GK428 4.2 L V8	G	105	+1:30.634
17	LMP2	34	(Poland) Inter Europol Competition	(France) Reshad de Gerus (United States) Bijoy Garg	Oreca 07	G	105	+1:52.454
17	LMP2	34	(Poland) Inter Europol Competition	(France) Reshad de Gerus (United States) Bijoy Garg	Gibson GK428 4.2 L V8	G	105	+1:52.454
18	LMP2	10	(United Kingdom) Vector Sport	(Republic of Ireland) Ryan Cullen (Brazil) Pietro Fittipaldi (France) Vladislav Lomko	Oreca 07	G	104	+1 Lap
18	LMP2	10	(United Kingdom) Vector Sport	(Republic of Ireland) Ryan Cullen (Brazil) Pietro Fittipaldi (France) Vladislav Lomko	Gibson GK428 4.2 L V8	G	104	+1 Lap
19	LMP2	9	(Germany) Proton Competition	(United Kingdom) Sebastian Priaulx (Germany) Jonas Ried (Germany) Mike Rockenfeller	Oreca 07	G	104	+1 Lap
19	LMP2	9	(Germany) Proton Competition	(United Kingdom) Sebastian Priaulx (Germany) Jonas Ried (Germany) Mike Rockenfeller	Gibson GK428 4.2 L V8	G	104	+1 Lap
20	LMP2 Pro-Am	88	(Germany) Proton Competition	(Austria) René Binder (Austria) Horst Felbermayr Jr. (Austria) Horst Felix Felbermayr	Oreca 07	G	104	+1 Lap
20	LMP2 Pro-Am	88	(Germany) Proton Competition	(Austria) René Binder (Austria) Horst Felbermayr Jr. (Austria) Horst Felix Felbermayr	Gibson GK428 4.2 L V8	G	104	+1 Lap
21	LMP2	29	(France) Forestier Racing by Panis	(United Kingdom) Oliver Gray (France) Esteban Masson (France) Louis Rousset	Oreca 07	G	103	+2 Laps
21	LMP2	29	(France) Forestier Racing by Panis	(United Kingdom) Oliver Gray (France) Esteban Masson (France) Louis Rousset	Gibson GK428 4.2 L V8	G	103	+2 Laps
22	LMP2	43	(Poland) Inter Europol Competition	(France) Tom Dillmann (Poland) Jakub Śmiechowski (United Kingdom) Nick Yelloly	Oreca 07	G	103	+2 Laps
22	LMP2	43	(Poland) Inter Europol Competition	(France) Tom Dillmann (Poland) Jakub Śmiechowski (United Kingdom) Nick Yelloly	Gibson GK428 4.2 L V8	G	103	+2 Laps
23	LMP2	18	(France) IDEC Sport	(United Kingdom) Jamie Chadwick (Germany) Laurents Hörr (Italy) Valerio Rinicella	Oreca 07	G	103	+2 Laps
23	LMP2	18	(France) IDEC Sport	(United Kingdom) Jamie Chadwick (Germany) Laurents Hörr (Italy) Valerio Rinicella	Gibson GK428 4.2 L V8	G	103	+2 Laps
24	**LMP3**	**85**	**(France) R-ace GP**	**(France) Fabien Michal** **(Luxembourg) Pierre-Alexandre Provost** **(Germany) Hugo Schwarze**	**Duqueine D09**	M	**100**	**+5 Laps‡**
24	**LMP3**	**85**	**(France) R-ace GP**	**(France) Fabien Michal** **(Luxembourg) Pierre-Alexandre Provost** **(Germany) Hugo Schwarze**	**Toyota V35A-FTS 3.5 L Turbo V6**	M	**100**	**+5 Laps‡**
25	LMP3	17	(Switzerland) CLX Motorsport	(France) Louis Iglesias (France) Paul Lanchère (Brazil) Alexander Jacoby	Ligier JS P325	M	100	+5 Laps
25	LMP3	17	(Switzerland) CLX Motorsport	(France) Louis Iglesias (France) Paul Lanchère (Brazil) Alexander Jacoby	Toyota V35A-FTS 3.5 L Turbo V6	M	100	+5 Laps
26	LMP3	13	(Poland) Inter Europol Competition	(United Arab Emirates) Alexander Bukhantsov (Chinese Taipei) Chun-Ting Chou (Colombia) Henry Cubides Olarte	Ligier JS P325	M	99	+6 Laps
26	LMP3	13	(Poland) Inter Europol Competition	(United Arab Emirates) Alexander Bukhantsov (Chinese Taipei) Chun-Ting Chou (Colombia) Henry Cubides Olarte	Toyota V35A-FTS 3.5 L Turbo V6	M	99	+6 Laps
27	LMP3	11	(Italy) EuroInternational	(United Kingdom) Matthew Richard Bell (Belgium) Douwe Dedecker (Netherlands) Max van der Snel	Ligier JS P325	M	99	+6 Laps
27	LMP3	11	(Italy) EuroInternational	(United Kingdom) Matthew Richard Bell (Belgium) Douwe Dedecker (Netherlands) Max van der Snel	Toyota V35A-FTS 3.5 L Turbo V6	M	99	+6 Laps
28	LMP3	5	(Germany) Rinaldi Racing	(Portugal) José Cautela (Denmark) Mikkel Gaarde Pedersen (Italy) Alvise Rodella	Ligier JS P325	M	99	+6 Laps
28	LMP3	5	(Germany) Rinaldi Racing	(Portugal) José Cautela (Denmark) Mikkel Gaarde Pedersen (Italy) Alvise Rodella	Toyota V35A-FTS 3.5 L Turbo V6	M	99	+6 Laps
29	LMP3	35	(France) Ultimate	(Brazil) Lucas Fecury (Denmark) Sebastian Gravlund (United Kingdom) Terrence Woodward	Ligier JS P325	M	98	+7 Laps
29	LMP3	35	(France) Ultimate	(Brazil) Lucas Fecury (Denmark) Sebastian Gravlund (United Kingdom) Terrence Woodward	Toyota V35A-FTS 3.5 L Turbo V6	M	98	+7 Laps
30	LMP3	4	(Luxembourg) DKR Engineering	(United States) Wyatt Brichacek (France) Romain Favre (Estonia) Antti Rammo	Ligier JS P325	M	98	+7 Laps
30	LMP3	4	(Luxembourg) DKR Engineering	(United States) Wyatt Brichacek (France) Romain Favre (Estonia) Antti Rammo	Toyota V35A-FTS 3.5 L Turbo V6	M	98	+7 Laps
31	LMP3	31	(France) Racing Spirit of Léman	(Switzerland) Ralph Meichtry (Germany) Lenny Ried (Switzerland) Grégory de Sybourg	Ligier JS P325	M	98	+7 Laps
31	LMP3	31	(France) Racing Spirit of Léman	(Switzerland) Ralph Meichtry (Germany) Lenny Ried (Switzerland) Grégory de Sybourg	Toyota V35A-FTS 3.5 L Turbo V6	M	98	+7 Laps
32	LMP3	68	(France) M Racing	(United Kingdom) Nick Adcock (United Kingdom) Alfie Briggs (France) Stéphane Tribaudini	Ligier JS P325	M	98	+7 Laps
32	LMP3	68	(France) M Racing	(United Kingdom) Nick Adcock (United Kingdom) Alfie Briggs (France) Stéphane Tribaudini	Toyota V35A-FTS 3.5 L Turbo V6	M	98	+7 Laps
33	**LMGT3**	**62**	**Team Qatar by Iron Lynx**	**(Qatar) Abdulla Al-Khelaifi** **(Germany) Julian Hanses** **(Estonia) Ralf Aron**	**Mercedes-AMG GT3 Evo**	G	**98**	**+7 Laps‡**
33	**LMGT3**	**62**	**Team Qatar by Iron Lynx**	**(Qatar) Abdulla Al-Khelaifi** **(Germany) Julian Hanses** **(Estonia) Ralf Aron**	**Mercedes-AMG M159 6.2 L V8**	G	**98**	**+7 Laps‡**
34	LMGT3	33	(United Kingdom) TF Sport	(Republic of Ireland) Charlie Eastwood (United States) Blake McDonald (United States) Alec Udell	Chevrolet Corvette Z06 GT3.R	G	98	+7 Laps
34	LMGT3	33	(United Kingdom) TF Sport	(Republic of Ireland) Charlie Eastwood (United States) Blake McDonald (United States) Alec Udell	Chevrolet LT6.R 5.5 L V8	G	98	+7 Laps
35	LMGT3	77	(Germany) Proton Competition	(Australia) Martin Berry (Netherlands) Huub van Eijndhoven (United Kingdom) Harry King	Porsche 911 GT3 R (992.2)	G	98	+7 Laps
35	LMGT3	77	(Germany) Proton Competition	(Australia) Martin Berry (Netherlands) Huub van Eijndhoven (United Kingdom) Harry King	Porsche M97/80 4.2 L Flat-6	G	98	+7 Laps
36	LMGT3	57	(Switzerland) Kessel Racing	(France) Mathys Jaubert (Japan) Takeshi Kimura (Brazil) Daniel Serra	Ferrari 296 GT3 Evo	G	98	+7 Laps
36	LMGT3	57	(Switzerland) Kessel Racing	(France) Mathys Jaubert (Japan) Takeshi Kimura (Brazil) Daniel Serra	Ferrari F163CE 3.0 L Turbo V6	G	98	+7 Laps
37	LMGT3	55	(Switzerland) Spirit of Race	(United Kingdom) Duncan Cameron (Republic of Ireland) Matt Griffin (South Africa) David Perel	Ferrari 296 GT3 Evo	G	97	+8 Laps
37	LMGT3	55	(Switzerland) Spirit of Race	(United Kingdom) Duncan Cameron (Republic of Ireland) Matt Griffin (South Africa) David Perel	Ferrari F163CE 3.0 L Turbo V6	G	97	+8 Laps
38	LMGT3	75	(Germany) Proton Competition	(United States) Matt Kurzejewski (Austria) Richard Lietz (Australia) Tom Sargent	Porsche 911 GT3 R (992.2)	G	97	+8 Laps
38	LMGT3	75	(Germany) Proton Competition	(United States) Matt Kurzejewski (Austria) Richard Lietz (Australia) Tom Sargent	Porsche M97/80 4.2 L Flat-6	G	97	+8 Laps
39	LMGT3	54	(Denmark) High Class Racing	(Austria) Klaus Bachler (Germany) Max Moritz (Belgium) Benjamin Paque	Porsche 911 GT3 R (992.2)	G	97	+8 Laps
39	LMGT3	54	(Denmark) High Class Racing	(Austria) Klaus Bachler (Germany) Max Moritz (Belgium) Benjamin Paque	Porsche M97/80 4.2 L Flat-6	G	97	+8 Laps
40	LMGT3	86	(United Kingdom) GR Racing	(United Kingdom) Lorcan Hanafin (Netherlands) Mex Jansen (United Kingdom) Michael Wainwright	Ferrari 296 GT3 Evo	G	97	+8 Laps
40	LMGT3	86	(United Kingdom) GR Racing	(United Kingdom) Lorcan Hanafin (Netherlands) Mex Jansen (United Kingdom) Michael Wainwright	Ferrari F163CE 3.0 L Turbo V6	G	97	+8 Laps
41	LMGT3	23	(United Kingdom) United Autosports	(United Kingdom) Michael Birch (United Kingdom) Wayne Boyd (Australia) Garnet Patterson	McLaren 720S GT3 Evo	G	96	+9 Laps
41	LMGT3	23	(United Kingdom) United Autosports	(United Kingdom) Michael Birch (United Kingdom) Wayne Boyd (Australia) Garnet Patterson	McLaren M840T 4.0 L Turbo V8	G	96	+9 Laps
42	LMGT3	59	(France) Racing Spirit of Léman	(France) Marius Fossard (France) Valentin Hasse-Clot (France) François Hériau	Aston Martin Vantage AMR GT3 Evo	G	95	+10 Laps
42	LMGT3	59	(France) Racing Spirit of Léman	(France) Marius Fossard (France) Valentin Hasse-Clot (France) François Hériau	Aston Martin M177 4.0 L Turbo V8	G	95	+10 Laps
43	LMP3	8	(Poland) Team Virage	(Spain) Daniel Nogales (Italy) Matteo Quintarelli (France) Louis Stern	Ligier JS P325	M	84	+21 Laps
43	LMP3	8	(Poland) Team Virage	(Spain) Daniel Nogales (Italy) Matteo Quintarelli (France) Louis Stern	Toyota V35A-FTS 3.5 L Turbo V6	M	84	+21 Laps
Not classified
	LMGT3	51	(Italy) AF Corse	(Denmark) Conrad Laursen (Italy) Davide Rigon (France) Charles-Henri Samani	Ferrari 296 GT3 Evo	G	86	
	LMGT3	51	(Italy) AF Corse	(Denmark) Conrad Laursen (Italy) Davide Rigon (France) Charles-Henri Samani	Ferrari F163CE 3.0 L Turbo V6	G	86	
	LMGT3	74	(Switzerland) Kessel Racing	(United Kingdom) Andrew Gilbert (France) Romain Leroux (Spain) Fran Rueda	Ferrari 296 GT3 Evo	G	38	Contact
	LMGT3	74	(Switzerland) Kessel Racing	(United Kingdom) Andrew Gilbert (France) Romain Leroux (Spain) Fran Rueda	Ferrari F163CE 3.0 L Turbo V6	G	38	Contact
	LMGT3	63	(Italy) Iron Lynx	(Angola) Rui Andrade (Zimbabwe) Ameerh Naran (Brazil) Sérgio Sette Câmara	Mercedes-AMG GT3 Evo	G	38	Contact
	LMGT3	63	(Italy) Iron Lynx	(Angola) Rui Andrade (Zimbabwe) Ameerh Naran (Brazil) Sérgio Sette Câmara	Mercedes-AMG M159 6.2 L V8	G	38	Contact
WD	LMGT3	50	(Italy) Richard Mille AF Corse	(Italy) Riccardo Agostini (Brazil) Custodio Toledo (France) Lilou Wadoux	Ferrari 296 GT3 Evo	G	0	Crash in practice
WD	LMGT3	50	(Italy) Richard Mille AF Corse	(Italy) Riccardo Agostini (Brazil) Custodio Toledo (France) Lilou Wadoux	Ferrari F163CE 3.0 L Turbo V6	G	0	Crash in practice

=== Statistics ===
==== Fastest lap ====
Class	No.	Entrant	Driver	Time	Lap
LMP2	37	(Switzerland) CLX Motorsport	(Denmark) Theodor Jensen	1:45.480	17
LMP2 Pro/Am	14	(France) TDS Racing	(France) Sami Meguetounif	1:47.557	37
LMP3	11	(Italy) EuroInternational	(United Kingdom) Matthew Richard Bell	1:56.647	25
LMGT3	33	(United Kingdom) TF Sport	(United States) Blake McDonald	2:01.769	30

European Le Mans Series
Previous race: 4 Hours of Spa-Francorchamps	2026 season	Next race: 4 Hours of Portimão
