= 2024 Road to Le Mans =

Automobile endurance event

Circuit de la Sarthe track

The 9th Road to Le Mans was a sports car race held on 14 and 15 June 2024 at the Circuit de la Sarthe, Le Mans, France. The race featured LMP3 and GT3 category cars competing in their respective classes.

== Entry list ==
Icon	Series
MLMS	Michelin Le Mans Cup
ELMS	European Le Mans Series
GTWC	SRO GT World Challenge
ALMS	Asian Le Mans Series
RLMS	Road to Le Mans only

No.	Entrant	Car	Series	Driver 1	Driver 2
LMP3 (40 entries)
2	(Spain) CD Sport	Ligier JS P320 - Nissan	MLMS	(Lebanon) Shahan Sarkissian	(France) Willyam Gosselin
3	(Luxembourg) DKR Engineering	Duqueine M30 - D08 - Nissan	ELMS	(China) Pengcheng Ye	(China) Xie Xinzhe
4	(United Kingdom) Nielsen Racing	Ligier JS P320 - Nissan	RLMS	(United States) Anthony McIntosh	(Canada) Garett Grist
5	(United Kingdom) RLR MSport	Ligier JS P320 - Nissan	ELMS	(Mexico) Ian Aguilera	(Australia) Garth Walden
6	(France) ANS Motorsport	Ligier JS P320 - Nissan	MLMS	(France) Clément Moreno	(France) Nicolas Schatz
7	(United Kingdom) Nielsen Racing	Ligier JS P320 - Nissan	MLMS	(United Kingdom) Anthony Wells	(United Kingdom) Wayne Boyd
8	(Poland) Team Virage	Ligier JS P320 - Nissan	ELMS	(Greece) Georgios Kolovos	(Portugal) Bernardo Pinheiro
9	(Switzerland) Graff Racing	Ligier JS P320 - Nissan	MLMS	(France) Louis Rossi	(China) Haowen Luo
10	(Switzerland) Racing Spirit of Léman	Ligier JS P320 - Nissan	MLMS	(France) Christophe Lapierre	(France) Marius Fossard
11	(Spain) CD Sport	Ligier JS P320 - Nissan	MLMS	(United Kingdom) Chris Short	(France) Franck Chappard
13	(France) M Racing	Ligier JS P320 - Nissan	MLMS	(France) Romano Ricci	(France) Alexandre Cougnaud
17	(France) IDEC Sport	Ligier JS P320 - Nissan	MLMS	(France) Patrice Lafargue	(France) Dino Lunardi
20	(Denmark) High Class Racing	Ligier JS P320 - Nissan	MLMS	(Denmark) Jens Reno Møller	(United Kingdom) Tommy Foster
21	(Italy) EuroInternational	Ligier JS P320 - Nissan	ELMS	(Finland) Miika Panu	(Canada) Daniel Ali
22	(Germany) WTM by Rinaldi Racing	Duqueine M30 - D08 - Nissan	MLMS	(Germany) Torsten Kratz	(Germany) Leonard Weiss
26	(Czech Republic) Bretton Racing	Ligier JS P320 - Nissan	MLMS	(United Kingdom) Ben Stone	(Czech Republic) Dan Skočdopole
27	(United Kingdom) P4 Racing	Ligier JS P320 - Nissan	MLMS	(United Kingdom) Andrew Ferguson	(United Kingdom) Louis Hamilton-Smith
28	(France) MV2S Racing	Ligier JS P320 - Nissan	RLMS	(France) Maxence Maurice	Viacheslav Gutak
29	(France) MV2S Racing	Ligier JS P320 - Nissan	MLMS	(France) Christophe Cresp	(Spain) Max Mayer
31	(Italy) EuroInternational	Ligier JS P320 - Nissan	RLMS	(France) Jean-René de Fournoux	(France) Hugo Rosati
34	(Poland) Inter Europol Competition	Ligier JS P320 - Nissan	MLMS	(United Arab Emirates) Alexander Bukhanstov (Note: Bukhantsov and Minskiy are Russian, but he competes under an Emirati and a Kyrgyz licence respectively as Russian national emblems were banned by the FIA following the Russian invasion of Ukraine.)	(Netherlands) Rik Koen
42	(United Kingdom) Steller Motorsport	Duqueine M30 - D08 - Nissan	MLMS	(France) Sylvain Guintoli	(United Kingdom) Sennan Fielding
43	(Poland) Inter Europol Competition	Ligier JS P320 - Nissan	MLMS	(United Kingdom) Tim Creswick	(Denmark) Sebastian Gravlund
44	(Poland) Team Virage	Ligier JS P320 - Nissan	MLMS	(United Kingdom) Jamie Falvey	(Romania) Mihnea Ștefan
50	(Germany) Reiter Engineering	Ligier JS P320 - Nissan	MLMS	(Austria) Horst Felbermayr Jr.	(Switzerland) Miklas Born
58	(Australia) GG Classics	Ligier JS P320 - Nissan	MLMS	(Australia) George Nakas	(Australia) Fraser Ross
59	(Poland) Team Virage	Ligier JS P320 - Nissan	MLMS	(Paraguay) Oscar Bittar	(Brazil) Ricardo Gracia Filho
62	(Czech Republic) Bretton Racing	Ligier JS P320 - Nissan	ALMS	(France) Romain Iannetta	(Poland) Szymon Ładniak
64	(Switzerland) Racing Spirit of Léman	Ligier JS P320 - Nissan	ELMS	(Austria) Michael Doppelmayr	(Germany) Pierre Kaffer
66	(Germany) Rinaldi Racing	Ligier JS P320 - Nissan	MLMS	(Germany) Steve Parrow	(Germany) Daniel Keilwitz
67	(Switzerland) Haegeli by T2 Racing	Duqueine M30 - D08 - Nissan	MLMS	(Switzerland) Pieder Decurtins	(Switzerland) Samir Ben
68	(Switzerland) Haegeli by T2 Racing	Duqueine M30 - D08 - Nissan	RLMS	(Germany) Marcel Oosenbrugh	(Germany) Dominik Schraml
71	(Germany) Rinaldi Racing	Ligier JS P320 - Nissan	MLMS	(Germany) Stefan Aust	(Germany) Felipe Fernández Laser
76	(Poland) Team Virage	Ligier JS P320 - Nissan	RLMS	(Poland) Jacek Zielonka	(France) Raphaël Narac
77	(Iceland) Team Thor	Ligier JS P320 - Nissan	MLMS	(Iceland) Auðunn Guðmundsson	(United Kingdom) Colin Noble
84	(France) ANS Motorsport	Ligier JS P320 - Nissan	MLMS	(France) Julien Lemoine	(France) Paul Trojani
85	(France) R-ace GP	Duqueine M30 - D08 - Nissan	MLMS	(France) Fabien Michal	(France) Hadrien David
87	(Switzerland) Cool Racing	Ligier JS P320 - Nissan	MLMS	(United Kingdom) James Sweetnam	(France) Adrien Closmenil
97	(Switzerland) Cool Racing	Ligier JS P320 - Nissan	MLMS	(France) Adrien Chila	(Switzerland) David Droux
99	(Netherlands) More Motorsport	Ligier JS P320 - Nissan	MLMS	(Netherlands) Mark van der Snel	(Netherlands) Max van der Snel
GT3 (20 entries)
12	(Switzerland) Kessel Racing	Ferrari 296 GT3	MLMS	(France) Frédéric Jousset	(Italy) David Fumanelli
14	(Germany) GetSpeed Performance	Mercedes-AMG GT3 Evo	ALMS	(Luxembourg) Steve Jans	(United States) Anthony Bartone
18	(Denmark) High Class Racing	Porsche 911 GT3 R (992)	MLMS	(United Kingdom) Nick Jones	(Germany) Sven Müller
23	(Spain) Biogas Motorsport	Ferrari 296 GT3	MLMS	(Spain) Josep Mayola	(Spain) Marc Carol
24	(United Kingdom) Steller Motorsport	Audi R8 LMS Evo II	MLMS	(United Kingdom) Dominic Paul	(United Kingdom) Rory Butcher
25	(Germany) Heart of Racing by SPS	Mercedes-AMG GT3 Evo	GTWC	(Germany) Valentin Pierburg	(United States) Gray Newell
51	(Italy) AF Corse	Ferrari 296 GT3	MLMS	(United States) Matt Kurzejewski	(Italy) Alessandro Balzan
57	(Switzerland) Kessel Racing	Ferrari 296 GT3	ELMS	(Canada) Orey Fidani	(Germany) Lars Kern
65	(Austria) Team Motopark	Mercedes-AMG GT3 Evo	ALMS	(Germany) Heiko Neumann	(Germany) Timo Rumpfkeil
73	(Germany) Proton Huber Competition	Porsche 911 GT3 R (992)	MLMS	(Germany) Jörg Dreisow	(Germany) Manuel Lauck
74	(Switzerland) Kessel Racing	Ferrari 296 GT3	MLMS	(United Kingdom) Andrew Gilbert	(Spain) Fran Rueda
80	(Italy) AF Corse	Ferrari 296 GT3	RLMS	(Switzerland) Gino Forgione	(Italy) Michele Rugolo
82	(Italy) AF Corse	Ferrari 296 GT3	ELMS	(France) Charles-Henri Samani	(France) Emmanuel Collard
83	(Italy) Iron Dames	Lamborghini Huracán GT3 Evo 2	MLMS	(France) Célia Martin	(Switzerland) Karen Gaillard
88	(Italy) AF Corse	Ferrari 296 GT3	MLMS	(Brazil) Custodio Toledo	(Italy) Riccardo Agostini
90	(United Kingdom) Blackthorn	Aston Martin Vantage AMR GT3 Evo	MLMS	(Singapore) Martin Berry	(United Kingdom) Lorcan Hanafin
91	(United Kingdom) Blackthorn	Aston Martin Vantage AMR GT3 Evo	MLMS	(Switzerland) Claude Bovet	(United Kingdom) David McDonald
95	(Switzerland) Racing Spirit of Léman	Aston Martin Vantage AMR GT3 Evo	ELMS	(United States) Derek DeBoer	(France) Valentin Hasse-Clot

=== Reserve entries ===
In addition to the sixty-two entries given invitations for the race, seven entries are put on a reserve list to potentially replace any invitations that were not accepted or withdrawn. Reserve entries are ordered with the first reserve replacing the first withdrawal from the race, regardless of the class of either entry.

Reserve	Class	No.	Entrant	Car	Series	Driver 1	Driver 2
1st	GT3	56	(Italy) Ebimotors	Porsche 911 GT3 R (992)	RLMS	(Italy) Paolo Venerosi Pesciolini	TBA
2nd	LMP3	69	(France) Zosh Competition	Ligier JS P320 - Nissan	RLMS	(France) Jean-Rene de Fournoux	(France) Hugo Rosati
3rd	LMP3	16	(Italy) TS Corse	Duqueine M30 - D08	RLMS	(Italy) Gianluca Giraudi	TBA
4th	GT3	75	(Austria) Team Motopark	Mercedes-AMG GT3 Evo	RLMS	(Germany) Timo Rumpfkeil	TBA
5th	GT3	54	(Italy) Dinamic GT	Porsche 911 GT3 R (992)	GTWC	(Germany) Thomas Kiefer	(Kyrgyzstan) Stanislav Minsky
6th	LMP3	96	(France) Zosh Competition	Ligier JS P320 - Nissan	RLMS	(France) Claude Rosati	(France) Rodolphe Rosati
7th	GT3	55	(Italy) Dinamic GT	Porsche 911 GT3 R (992)	GTWC	(Germany) Marvin Dienst	(Austria) Philipp Sager

== Qualifying ==
Provisional pole positions in each class are denoted in bold.
