= 2026 4 Hours of Barcelona =

Endurance sportscar racing event

The layout of the Circuit de Barcelona-Catalunya

The 2026 4 Hours of Barcelona was an endurance sportscar racing event, held between 10 and 12 April 2026 at Circuit de Barcelona-Catalunya in Montmeló, Spain. It was the first of six rounds of the 2026 European Le Mans Series season, and the sixth consecutive running of the event as part of the championship.

== Entry list ==
The provisional entry list was published on 1 April 2026 and consisted of 47 entries across 4 categories – 11 in LMP2, 12 in LMP2 Pro-Am, 10 in LMP3, and 14 in LMGT3.

== Schedule ==
Date	Time (local: CEST)	Event
Friday, 10 April	11:50	Free Practice 1
Friday, 10 April	16:10	Bronze Driver Collective Test
Saturday, 11 April	10:10	Free Practice 2
Saturday, 11 April	15:05	Qualifying – LMGT3
Saturday, 11 April	15:30	Qualifying – LMP3
Saturday, 11 April	15:55	Qualifying – LMP2 Pro-Am
Saturday, 11 April	16:20	Qualifying – LMP2
Sunday, 12 April	12:00	Race

== Free practice ==
Two practice sessions were held before the event: one on Friday, and one on Saturday. The session on Friday afternoon lasted 90 minutes, and the session on Saturday morning also lasted 90 minutes.

=== Practice 1 ===
The first practice session started at 11:50 CEST on Friday.

Class	No.	Entrant	Driver	Time
LMP2	25	(Portugal) Algarve Pro Racing	(United Kingdom) Jake Hughes	1:29.720
LMP2 Pro-Am	14	(France) TDS Racing	(France) Sami Meguetounif	1:30.517
LMP3	13	(Poland) Inter Europol Competition	(Colombia) Henry Cubides Olarte	1:38.236
LMGT3	57	(Switzerland) Kessel Racing	(Brazil) Daniel Serra	1:41.577

- Note: Only the fastest car in each class is shown.

=== Practice 2 ===
The second practice session started at 10:10 CEST on Saturday.

Class	No.	Entrant	Driver	Time
LMP2	34	(Poland) Inter Europol Competition	(France) Reshad de Gerus	1:29.622
LMP2 Pro-Am	83	(Italy) AF Corse	(France) Matthieu Vaxivière	1:30.534
LMP3	11	(Italy) EuroInternational	(Netherlands) Max van der Snel	1:40.465
LMGT3	59	(France) Racing Spirit of Léman	(France) Valentin Hasse-Clot	1:41.610

- Note: Only the fastest car in each class is shown.

== Qualifying ==
Qualifying started at 15:05 CEST, with four sessions of fifteen minutes each, one session for each class.

=== Qualifying results ===
Pole position winners in each class are marked in bold.

Pos	Class	No.	Team	Driver	Time	Gap	Grid
1	**LMP2**	**34**	**(Poland) Inter Europol Competition**	**(France) Reshad de Gerus**	**1:28.368**	—	1
2	LMP2	29	(France) Forestier Racing by Panis	(France) Esteban Masson	1:28.557	+0.189	2
3	LMP2	43	(Poland) Inter Europol Competition	(France) Tom Dillmann	1:28.634	+0.266	3
4	LMP2	18	(France) IDEC Sport	(Germany) Laurents Hörr	1:28.708	+0.340	4
5	LMP2	25	(Portugal) Algarve Pro Racing	(United Kingdom) Jake Hughes	1:28.830	+0.462	5
6	LMP2	22	(United Kingdom) United Autosports	(United Kingdom) Ben Hanley	1:29.045	+0.677	6
7	LMP2	28	(France) IDEC Sport	(France) Paul-Loup Chatin	1:29.107	+0.739	7
8	LMP2	24	(United Kingdom) Nielsen Racing	(Australia) Jack Doohan	1:29.220	+0.852	8
9	LMP2	37	(Switzerland) CLX Motorsport	(Denmark) Theodor Jensen	1:29.321	+0.953	9
10	LMP2	10	(United Kingdom) Vector Sport	(Brazil) Pietro Fittipaldi	1:29.363	+0.995	10
11	LMP2	9	(Germany) Proton Competition	(Germany) Mike Rockenfeller	1:29.824	+1.456	11
12	**LMP2 Pro-Am**	**30**	**(France) Duqueine Team**	**(Italy) Giorgio Roda**	**1:30.332**	**+1.964**	12
13	LMP2 Pro-Am	99	(United States) AO by TF	(United States) P. J. Hyett	1:31.272	+2.904	13
14	LMP2 Pro-Am	19	(United Arab Emirates) Rossa Racing by Virage	(United States) John Falb	1:31.423	+3.055	14
15	LMP2 Pro-Am	7	(United Kingdom) Vector Sport	(Denmark) Jens Reno Møller	1:31.598	+3.230	15
16	LMP2 Pro-Am	47	(Switzerland) CLX Motorsport	(Greece) Georgios Kolovos	1:32.032	+3.664	16
17	LMP2 Pro-Am	3	(Luxembourg) DKR Engineering	(Belgium) Jean Glorieux	1:32.043	+3.675	17
18	LMP2 Pro-Am	14	(France) TDS Racing	(United States) Steven Thomas	1:32.305	+3.937	18
19	LMP2 Pro-Am	20	(Portugal) Algarve Pro Racing	(Denmark) Michael Jensen	1:32.534	+4.166	19
20	LMP2 Pro-Am	83	(Italy) AF Corse	(France) François Perrodo	1:32.914	+4.546	20
21	LMP2 Pro-Am	88	(Germany) Proton Competition	(Austria) Horst Felbermayr Jr.	1:33.068	+4.700	21
22	LMP2 Pro-Am	27	(United Kingdom) Nielsen Racing	(Greece) Kriton Lendoudis	1:34.836	+6.468	22
23	LMP2 Pro-Am	21	(United Kingdom) United Autosports	(Brazil) Daniel Schneider	1:35.143	+6.775	23
24	**LMP3**	**85**	**(France) R-ace GP**	**(Germany) Hugo Schwarze**	**1:36.524**	**+8.156**	24
25	LMP3	8	(Poland) Team Virage	(Spain) Daniel Nogales	1:37.451	+9.083	25
26	LMP3	31	(France) Racing Spirit of Léman	(Germany) Lenny Ried	1:37.636	+9.268	26
27	LMP3	5	(Germany) Rinaldi Racing	(Denmark) Mikkel Gaarde Pedersen	1:37.664	+9.296	27
28	LMP3	68	(France) M Racing	(France) Quentin Antonel	1:38.096	+9.728	28
29	LMP3	11	(Italy) EuroInternational	(Belgium) Douwe Dedecker	1:38.127	+9.759	29
30	LMP3	17	(Switzerland) CLX Motorsport	(Brazil) Bruno Ribeiro	1:38.426	+10.058	30
31	LMP3	4	(Luxembourg) DKR Engineering	(United States) Wyatt Brichacek	1:38.613	+10.245	31
32	LMP3	35	(France) Ultimate	(Denmark) Sebastian Gravlund	1:38.930	+10.562	32
33	**LMGT3**	**62**	**Team Qatar by Iron Lynx**	**(Qatar) Abdulla Al-Khelaifi**	**1:42.289**	**+13.921**	34
34	LMGT3	33	(United Kingdom) TF Sport	(United States) Blake McDonald	1:42.352	+13.984	35
35	LMGT3	75	(Germany) Proton Competition	(United States) Matt Kurzejewski	1:42.774	+14.406	36
36	LMGT3	59	(France) Racing Spirit of Léman	(France) Clément Mateu	1:42.951	+14.583	37
37	LMGT3	74	(Switzerland) Kessel Racing	(United Kingdom) Andrew Gilbert	1:43.152	+14.784	38
38	LMGT3	57	(Switzerland) Kessel Racing	(Japan) Takeshi Kimura	1:43.530	+15.162	39
39	LMGT3	55	(Switzerland) Spirit of Race	(United Kingdom) Duncan Cameron	1:43.776	+15.408	40
40	LMGT3	50	(Italy) Richard Mille AF Corse	(Brazil) Custodio Toledo	1:43.847	+15.479	41
41	LMGT3	63	(Italy) Iron Lynx	(Zimbabwe) Ameerh Naran	1:44.016	+15.648	42
42	LMGT3	77	(Germany) Proton Competition	(Japan) "Bankcy"	1:44.107	+15.739	43
43	LMGT3	86	(United Kingdom) GR Racing	(United Kingdom) Michael Wainwright	1:44.515	+16.147	44
44	LMGT3	23	(United Kingdom) United Autosports	(United Kingdom) Michael Birch	1:45.544	+17.176	45
45	LMGT3	54	(Denmark) High Class Racing	(Denmark) Dennis Andersen	1:45.596	+17.228	46
46	LMP3	13	(Poland) Inter Europol Competition	(Colombia) Henry Cubides Olarte	No time set		33
47	LMGT3	51	(Italy) AF Corse	No time established			47

== Race ==
The race started at 12:00 CEST, and ran for 4 hours. The race was won by the No. 29 Forestier Racing by Panis Oreca 07, driven by Oliver Gray, Esteban Masson and Louis Rousset.

=== Race results ===
The minimum number of laps for classification (70% of overall winning car's distance) was 95 laps. Class winners are in bold and ‡.

Pos	Class	No	Team	Drivers	Chassis	Tyre	Laps	Time/Retired
Pos	Class	No	Team	Drivers	Engine	Tyre	Laps	Time/Retired
1	**LMP2**	**29**	**(France) Forestier Racing by Panis**	**(United Kingdom) Oliver Gray** **(France) Esteban Masson** **(France) Louis Rousset**	**Oreca 07**	G	**135**	**4:26:59.110‡**
1	**LMP2**	**29**	**(France) Forestier Racing by Panis**	**(United Kingdom) Oliver Gray** **(France) Esteban Masson** **(France) Louis Rousset**	**Gibson GK428 4.2 L V8**	G	**135**	**4:26:59.110‡**
2	LMP2	34	(Poland) Inter Europol Competition	(France) Reshad de Gerus (United States) Bijoy Garg	Oreca 07	G	135	+13.398
2	LMP2	34	(Poland) Inter Europol Competition	(France) Reshad de Gerus (United States) Bijoy Garg	Gibson GK428 4.2 L V8	G	135	+13.398
3	LMP2	22	(United Kingdom) United Autosports	(United Kingdom) Ben Hanley (Australia) Griffin Peebles (Switzerland) Grégoire Saucy	Oreca 07	G	135	+17.784
3	LMP2	22	(United Kingdom) United Autosports	(United Kingdom) Ben Hanley (Australia) Griffin Peebles (Switzerland) Grégoire Saucy	Gibson GK428 4.2 L V8	G	135	+17.784
4	LMP2	18	(France) IDEC Sport	(United Kingdom) Jamie Chadwick (Germany) Laurents Hörr (Italy) Valerio Rinicella	Oreca 07	G	135	+33.629
4	LMP2	18	(France) IDEC Sport	(United Kingdom) Jamie Chadwick (Germany) Laurents Hörr (Italy) Valerio Rinicella	Gibson GK428 4.2 L V8	G	135	+33.629
5	LMP2	43	(Poland) Inter Europol Competition	(France) Tom Dillmann (Poland) Jakub Śmiechowski (United Kingdom) Nick Yelloly	Oreca 07	G	135	+56.902
5	LMP2	43	(Poland) Inter Europol Competition	(France) Tom Dillmann (Poland) Jakub Śmiechowski (United Kingdom) Nick Yelloly	Gibson GK428 4.2 L V8	G	135	+56.902
6	LMP2	10	(United Kingdom) Vector Sport	(Republic of Ireland) Ryan Cullen (Brazil) Pietro Fittipaldi (France) Vladislav Lomko	Oreca 07	G	135	+1:00.627
6	LMP2	10	(United Kingdom) Vector Sport	(Republic of Ireland) Ryan Cullen (Brazil) Pietro Fittipaldi (France) Vladislav Lomko	Gibson GK428 4.2 L V8	G	135	+1:00.627
7	LMP2	24	(United Kingdom) Nielsen Racing	(Australia) Jack Doohan (Israel) Roy Nissany (United Kingdom) Edward Pearson	Oreca 07	G	135	+1:03.292
7	LMP2	24	(United Kingdom) Nielsen Racing	(Australia) Jack Doohan (Israel) Roy Nissany (United Kingdom) Edward Pearson	Gibson GK428 4.2 L V8	G	135	+1:03.292
8	**LMP2 Pro-Am**	**20**	**(Portugal) Algarve Pro Racing**	**(Denmark) Malthe Jakobsen** **(Denmark) Michael Jensen** **(Italy) Enzo Trulli**	**Oreca 07**	G	**135**	**+1:14.361‡**
8	**LMP2 Pro-Am**	**20**	**(Portugal) Algarve Pro Racing**	**(Denmark) Malthe Jakobsen** **(Denmark) Michael Jensen** **(Italy) Enzo Trulli**	**Gibson GK428 4.2 L V8**	G	**135**	**+1:14.361‡**
9	LMP2	37	(Switzerland) CLX Motorsport	(Mexico) Ian Aguilera (France) Adrien Closmenil (Denmark) Theodor Jensen	Oreca 07	G	135	+1:26.654
9	LMP2	37	(Switzerland) CLX Motorsport	(Mexico) Ian Aguilera (France) Adrien Closmenil (Denmark) Theodor Jensen	Gibson GK428 4.2 L V8	G	135	+1:26.654
10	LMP2 Pro-Am	83	(Italy) AF Corse	(Italy) Antonio Fuoco (France) François Perrodo (France) Matthieu Vaxivière	Oreca 07	G	135	+1:33.390
10	LMP2 Pro-Am	83	(Italy) AF Corse	(Italy) Antonio Fuoco (France) François Perrodo (France) Matthieu Vaxivière	Gibson GK428 4.2 L V8	G	135	+1:33.390
11	LMP2 Pro-Am	30	(France) Duqueine Team	(France) Doriane Pin (Italy) Giorgio Roda (Netherlands) Richard Verschoor	Oreca 07	G	135	+1:39.724
11	LMP2 Pro-Am	30	(France) Duqueine Team	(France) Doriane Pin (Italy) Giorgio Roda (Netherlands) Richard Verschoor	Gibson GK428 4.2 L V8	G	135	+1:39.724
12	LMP2 Pro-Am	14	(France) TDS Racing	(United States) Scott Huffaker (France) Sami Meguetounif (United States) Steven Thomas	Oreca 07	G	134	+1 Lap
12	LMP2 Pro-Am	14	(France) TDS Racing	(United States) Scott Huffaker (France) Sami Meguetounif (United States) Steven Thomas	Gibson GK428 4.2 L V8	G	134	+1 Lap
13	LMP2 Pro-Am	19	(United Arab Emirates) Rossa Racing by Virage	(Portugal) Manuel Espírito Santo (United States) John Falb (Netherlands) Rik Koen	Oreca 07	G	134	+1 Lap
13	LMP2 Pro-Am	19	(United Arab Emirates) Rossa Racing by Virage	(Portugal) Manuel Espírito Santo (United States) John Falb (Netherlands) Rik Koen	Gibson GK428 4.2 L V8	G	134	+1 Lap
14	LMP2 Pro-Am	7	(United Kingdom) Vector Sport	(Turkey) Cem Bölükbaşı (Spain) Lorenzo Fluxá (Denmark) Jens Reno Møller	Oreca 07	G	134	+1 Lap
14	LMP2 Pro-Am	7	(United Kingdom) Vector Sport	(Turkey) Cem Bölükbaşı (Spain) Lorenzo Fluxá (Denmark) Jens Reno Møller	Gibson GK428 4.2 L V8	G	134	+1 Lap
15	LMP2 Pro-Am	21	(United Kingdom) United Autosports	(United Kingdom) Oliver Jarvis (Japan) Marino Sato (Brazil) Daniel Schneider	Oreca 07	G	134	+1 Lap
15	LMP2 Pro-Am	21	(United Kingdom) United Autosports	(United Kingdom) Oliver Jarvis (Japan) Marino Sato (Brazil) Daniel Schneider	Gibson GK428 4.2 L V8	G	134	+1 Lap
16	LMP2	25	(Portugal) Algarve Pro Racing	(United Kingdom) Jake Hughes (Liechtenstein) Matthias Kaiser (France) Tristan Vautier	Oreca 07	G	134	+1 Lap
16	LMP2	25	(Portugal) Algarve Pro Racing	(United Kingdom) Jake Hughes (Liechtenstein) Matthias Kaiser (France) Tristan Vautier	Gibson GK428 4.2 L V8	G	134	+1 Lap
17	LMP2 Pro-Am	3	(Luxembourg) DKR Engineering	(Mexico) Sebastián Álvarez (Belgium) Jean Glorieux (France) Marlon Hernandez	Oreca 07	G	134	+1 Lap
17	LMP2 Pro-Am	3	(Luxembourg) DKR Engineering	(Mexico) Sebastián Álvarez (Belgium) Jean Glorieux (France) Marlon Hernandez	Gibson GK428 4.2 L V8	G	134	+1 Lap
18	LMP2 Pro-Am	88	(Germany) Proton Competition	(Austria) René Binder (Austria) Horst Felbermayr Jr. (Austria) Horst Felix Felbermayr	Oreca 07	G	134	+1 Lap
18	LMP2 Pro-Am	88	(Germany) Proton Competition	(Austria) René Binder (Austria) Horst Felbermayr Jr. (Austria) Horst Felix Felbermayr	Gibson GK428 4.2 L V8	G	134	+1 Lap
19	LMP2	28	(France) IDEC Sport	(France) Paul-Loup Chatin (France) Paul Lafargue (Netherlands) Job van Uitert	Oreca 07	G	133	+2 Laps
19	LMP2	28	(France) IDEC Sport	(France) Paul-Loup Chatin (France) Paul Lafargue (Netherlands) Job van Uitert	Gibson GK428 4.2 L V8	G	133	+2 Laps
20	LMP2 Pro-Am	99	(United States) AO by TF	(United States) Dane Cameron (Switzerland) Louis Delétraz (United States) P. J. Hyett	Oreca 07	G	131	+4 Laps
20	LMP2 Pro-Am	99	(United States) AO by TF	(United States) Dane Cameron (Switzerland) Louis Delétraz (United States) P. J. Hyett	Gibson GK428 4.2 L V8	G	131	+4 Laps
21	**LMP3**	**5**	**(Germany) Rinaldi Racing**	**(Portugal) José Cautela** **(Denmark) Mikkel Gaarde Pedersen** **(Italy) Alvise Rodella**	**Ligier JS P325**	MI	**127**	**+8 Laps‡**
21	**LMP3**	**5**	**(Germany) Rinaldi Racing**	**(Portugal) José Cautela** **(Denmark) Mikkel Gaarde Pedersen** **(Italy) Alvise Rodella**	**Toyota V35A-FTS 3.5 L Turbo V6**	MI	**127**	**+8 Laps‡**
22	LMP3	85	(France) R-ace GP	(France) Fabien Michal (Luxembourg) Pierre-Alexandre Provost (Germany) Hugo Schwarze	Duqueine D09	MI	127	+8 Laps
22	LMP3	85	(France) R-ace GP	(France) Fabien Michal (Luxembourg) Pierre-Alexandre Provost (Germany) Hugo Schwarze	Toyota V35A-FTS 3.5 L Turbo V6	MI	127	+8 Laps
23	LMP3	13	(Poland) Inter Europol Competition	(United Arab Emirates) Alexander Bukhantsov (Chinese Taipei) Chun-Ting Chou (Colombia) Henry Cubides Olarte	Ligier JS P325	MI	127	+8 Laps
23	LMP3	13	(Poland) Inter Europol Competition	(United Arab Emirates) Alexander Bukhantsov (Chinese Taipei) Chun-Ting Chou (Colombia) Henry Cubides Olarte	Toyota V35A-FTS 3.5 L Turbo V6	MI	127	+8 Laps
24	LMP3	11	(Italy) EuroInternational	(United Kingdom) Matthew Richard Bell (Belgium) Douwe Dedecker (Netherlands) Max van der Snel	Ligier JS P325	MI	127	+8 Laps
24	LMP3	11	(Italy) EuroInternational	(United Kingdom) Matthew Richard Bell (Belgium) Douwe Dedecker (Netherlands) Max van der Snel	Toyota V35A-FTS 3.5 L Turbo V6	MI	127	+8 Laps
25	LMP3	8	(Poland) Team Virage	(Spain) Daniel Nogales (Italy) Matteo Quintarelli (France) Louis Stern	Ligier JS P325	MI	127	+8 Laps
25	LMP3	8	(Poland) Team Virage	(Spain) Daniel Nogales (Italy) Matteo Quintarelli (France) Louis Stern	Toyota V35A-FTS 3.5 L Turbo V6	MI	127	+8 Laps
26	LMP3	35	(France) Ultimate	(Brazil) Lucas Fecury (Denmark) Sebastian Gravlund (United Kingdom) Terrence Woodward	Ligier JS P325	MI	126	+9 Laps
26	LMP3	35	(France) Ultimate	(Brazil) Lucas Fecury (Denmark) Sebastian Gravlund (United Kingdom) Terrence Woodward	Toyota V35A-FTS 3.5 L Turbo V6	MI	126	+9 Laps
27	LMP3	31	(France) Racing Spirit of Léman	(Switzerland) Ralph Meichtry (Germany) Lenny Ried (Switzerland) Grégory de Sybourg	Ligier JS P325	MI	126	+9 Laps
27	LMP3	31	(France) Racing Spirit of Léman	(Switzerland) Ralph Meichtry (Germany) Lenny Ried (Switzerland) Grégory de Sybourg	Toyota V35A-FTS 3.5 L Turbo V6	MI	126	+9 Laps
28	**LMGT3**	**75**	**(Germany) Proton Competition**	**(United States) Matt Kurzejewski** **(Austria) Richard Lietz** **(Australia) Tom Sargent**	**Porsche 911 GT3 R (992.2)**	G	**124**	**+11 Laps‡**
28	**LMGT3**	**75**	**(Germany) Proton Competition**	**(United States) Matt Kurzejewski** **(Austria) Richard Lietz** **(Australia) Tom Sargent**	**Porsche M97/80 4.2 L Flat-6**	G	**124**	**+11 Laps‡**
29	LMGT3	23	(United Kingdom) United Autosports	(United Kingdom) Michael Birch (United Kingdom) Wayne Boyd (Australia) Garnet Patterson	McLaren 720S GT3 Evo	G	124	+11 Laps
29	LMGT3	23	(United Kingdom) United Autosports	(United Kingdom) Michael Birch (United Kingdom) Wayne Boyd (Australia) Garnet Patterson	McLaren M840T 4.0 L Turbo V8	G	124	+11 Laps
30	LMGT3	57	(Switzerland) Kessel Racing	(France) Mathys Jaubert (Japan) Takeshi Kimura (Brazil) Daniel Serra	Ferrari 296 GT3 Evo	G	124	+11 Laps
30	LMGT3	57	(Switzerland) Kessel Racing	(France) Mathys Jaubert (Japan) Takeshi Kimura (Brazil) Daniel Serra	Ferrari F163CE 3.0 L Turbo V6	G	124	+11 Laps
31	LMGT3	62	Team Qatar by Iron Lynx	(Qatar) Abdulla Al-Khelaifi (United Kingdom) Adam Christodoulou (Germany) Julian Hanses	Mercedes-AMG GT3 Evo	G	124	+11 Laps
31	LMGT3	62	Team Qatar by Iron Lynx	(Qatar) Abdulla Al-Khelaifi (United Kingdom) Adam Christodoulou (Germany) Julian Hanses	Mercedes-AMG M159 6.2 L V8	G	124	+11 Laps
32	LMGT3	50	(Italy) Richard Mille AF Corse	(Italy) Riccardo Agostini (Monaco) Francesco Castellacci (Brazil) Custodio Toledo	Ferrari 296 GT3 Evo	G	124	+11 Laps
32	LMGT3	50	(Italy) Richard Mille AF Corse	(Italy) Riccardo Agostini (Monaco) Francesco Castellacci (Brazil) Custodio Toledo	Ferrari F163CE 3.0 L Turbo V6	G	124	+11 Laps
33	LMGT3	55	(Switzerland) Spirit of Race	(United Kingdom) Duncan Cameron (Republic of Ireland) Matt Griffin (South Africa) David Perel	Ferrari 296 GT3 Evo	G	124	+11 Laps
33	LMGT3	55	(Switzerland) Spirit of Race	(United Kingdom) Duncan Cameron (Republic of Ireland) Matt Griffin (South Africa) David Perel	Ferrari F163CE 3.0 L Turbo V6	G	124	+11 Laps
34	LMGT3	63	(Italy) Iron Lynx	(Angola) Rui Andrade (Zimbabwe) Ameerh Naran (Brazil) Sérgio Sette Câmara	Mercedes-AMG GT3 Evo	G	124	+11 Laps
34	LMGT3	63	(Italy) Iron Lynx	(Angola) Rui Andrade (Zimbabwe) Ameerh Naran (Brazil) Sérgio Sette Câmara	Mercedes-AMG M159 6.2 L V8	G	124	+11 Laps
35	LMGT3	77	(Germany) Proton Competition	(Japan) "Bankcy" (Netherlands) Huub van Eijndhoven (United Kingdom) Harry King	Porsche 911 GT3 R (992.2)	G	124	+11 Laps
35	LMGT3	77	(Germany) Proton Competition	(Japan) "Bankcy" (Netherlands) Huub van Eijndhoven (United Kingdom) Harry King	Porsche M97/80 4.2 L Flat-6	G	124	+11 Laps
36	LMGT3	51	(Italy) AF Corse	(Denmark) Conrad Laursen (Italy) Davide Rigon (France) Charles-Henri Samani	Ferrari 296 GT3 Evo	G	123	+12 Laps
36	LMGT3	51	(Italy) AF Corse	(Denmark) Conrad Laursen (Italy) Davide Rigon (France) Charles-Henri Samani	Ferrari F163CE 3.0 L Turbo V6	G	123	+12 Laps
37	LMGT3	59	(France) Racing Spirit of Léman	(France) Marius Fossard (France) Valentin Hasse-Clot (France) Clément Mateu	Aston Martin Vantage AMR GT3 Evo	G	121	+14 Laps
37	LMGT3	59	(France) Racing Spirit of Léman	(France) Marius Fossard (France) Valentin Hasse-Clot (France) Clément Mateu	Aston Martin M177 4.0 L Turbo V8	G	121	+14 Laps
38	LMGT3	54	(Denmark) High Class Racing	(Denmark) Dennis Andersen (Denmark) Anders Fjordbach (Germany) Laurin Heinrich	Porsche 911 GT3 R (992.2)	G	120	+15 Laps
38	LMGT3	54	(Denmark) High Class Racing	(Denmark) Dennis Andersen (Denmark) Anders Fjordbach (Germany) Laurin Heinrich	Porsche M97/80 4.2 L Flat-6	G	120	+15 Laps
39	LMP3	17	(Switzerland) CLX Motorsport	(France) Paul Lanchère (Brazil) Alexander Jacoby (Brazil) Bruno Ribeiro	Ligier JS P325	MI	119	+16 Laps
39	LMP3	17	(Switzerland) CLX Motorsport	(France) Paul Lanchère (Brazil) Alexander Jacoby (Brazil) Bruno Ribeiro	Toyota V35A-FTS 3.5 L Turbo V6	MI	119	+16 Laps
40	LMGT3	74	(Switzerland) Kessel Racing	(United Kingdom) Andrew Gilbert (France) Romain Leroux (Spain) Fran Rueda	Ferrari 296 GT3 Evo	G	118	+17 Laps
40	LMGT3	74	(Switzerland) Kessel Racing	(United Kingdom) Andrew Gilbert (France) Romain Leroux (Spain) Fran Rueda	Ferrari F163CE 3.0 L Turbo V6	G	118	+17 Laps
41	LMP3	4	(Luxembourg) DKR Engineering	(United States) Wyatt Brichacek (France) Romain Favre (Estonia) Antti Rammo	Ligier JS P325	MI	117	+18 Laps
41	LMP3	4	(Luxembourg) DKR Engineering	(United States) Wyatt Brichacek (France) Romain Favre (Estonia) Antti Rammo	Toyota V35A-FTS 3.5 L Turbo V6	MI	117	+18 Laps
Not classified
	LMGT3	33	(United Kingdom) TF Sport	(Republic of Ireland) Charlie Eastwood (United States) Blake McDonald (United States) Alec Udell	Chevrolet Corvette Z06 GT3.R	G	77	Contact
	LMGT3	33	(United Kingdom) TF Sport	(Republic of Ireland) Charlie Eastwood (United States) Blake McDonald (United States) Alec Udell	Chevrolet LT6.R 5.5 L V8	G	77	Contact
	LMGT3	86	(United Kingdom) GR Racing	(United Kingdom) Lorcan Hanafin (Netherlands) Mex Jansen (United Kingdom) Michael Wainwright	Ferrari 296 GT3 Evo	G	77	Contact
	LMGT3	86	(United Kingdom) GR Racing	(United Kingdom) Lorcan Hanafin (Netherlands) Mex Jansen (United Kingdom) Michael Wainwright	Ferrari F163CE 3.0 L Turbo V6	G	77	Contact
	LMP2	9	(Germany) Proton Competition	(United Kingdom) Sebastian Priaulx (Germany) Jonas Ried (Germany) Mike Rockenfeller	Oreca 07	G	0	Accident
	LMP2	9	(Germany) Proton Competition	(United Kingdom) Sebastian Priaulx (Germany) Jonas Ried (Germany) Mike Rockenfeller	Gibson GK428 4.2 L V8	G	0	Accident
	LMP2 Pro-Am	47	(Switzerland) CLX Motorsport	(Brazil) Felipe Fraga (Greece) Georgios Kolovos (France) Charles Milesi	Oreca 07	G	0	Accident
	LMP2 Pro-Am	47	(Switzerland) CLX Motorsport	(Brazil) Felipe Fraga (Greece) Georgios Kolovos (France) Charles Milesi	Gibson GK428 4.2 L V8	G	0	Accident
	LMP2 Pro-Am	27	(United Kingdom) Nielsen Racing	(Australia) James Allen (Greece) Kriton Lendoudis (United Kingdom) Alex Quinn	Oreca 07	G	0	Accident
	LMP2 Pro-Am	27	(United Kingdom) Nielsen Racing	(Australia) James Allen (Greece) Kriton Lendoudis (United Kingdom) Alex Quinn	Gibson GK428 4.2 L V8	G	0	Accident
	LMP3	68	(France) M Racing	(United Kingdom) Nick Adcock (France) Quentin Antonel (France) Thomas Imbourg	Ligier JS P325	MI	0	Accident
	LMP3	68	(France) M Racing	(United Kingdom) Nick Adcock (France) Quentin Antonel (France) Thomas Imbourg	Toyota V35A-FTS 3.5 L Turbo V6	MI	0	Accident

=== Statistics ===
==== Fastest lap ====
Class	No.	Entrant	Driver	Time	Lap
LMP2	43	(Poland) Inter Europol Competition	(France) Tom Dillmann	1:30.634	3
LMP2 Pro-Am	14	(France) TDS Racing	(United States) Scott Huffaker	1:31.303	6
LMP3	85	(France) R-ace GP	(Luxembourg) Pierre-Alexandre Provost	1:39.730	11
LMGT3	77	(Germany) Proton Competition	(United Kingdom) Harry King	1:42.297	8

European Le Mans Series
Previous race: None	2026 season	Next race: 4 Hours of Le Castellet
