= Dominic Paul =

British businessman

- Occupation: Businessman
- Title: Chief executive, Whitbread

Dominic Paul is a British business executive and has been the chief executive of Whitbread since January 2023. He was previously the chief executive of Domino's Pizza Group and Costa Coffee.

== Career ==
In 2010, Paul was appointed Royal Caribbean Cruises' vice-president and managing director for the UK and Ireland.

In 2016, Paul became the chief executive of Costa Coffee, succeeding Chris Rogers. He previously held positions at Bmibaby, British Airways, Go, and EasyJet.

In November 2019, Paul stepped down as chief executive of Costa.

In April 2021, he was made chief executive of Domino's Pizza Group, a role he stood down from at the end of 2022.

In January 2023, he became chief executive of Whitbread, succeeding Alison Brittain.
