= Sebastian Øgaard =

Danish racing driver (born 2004)

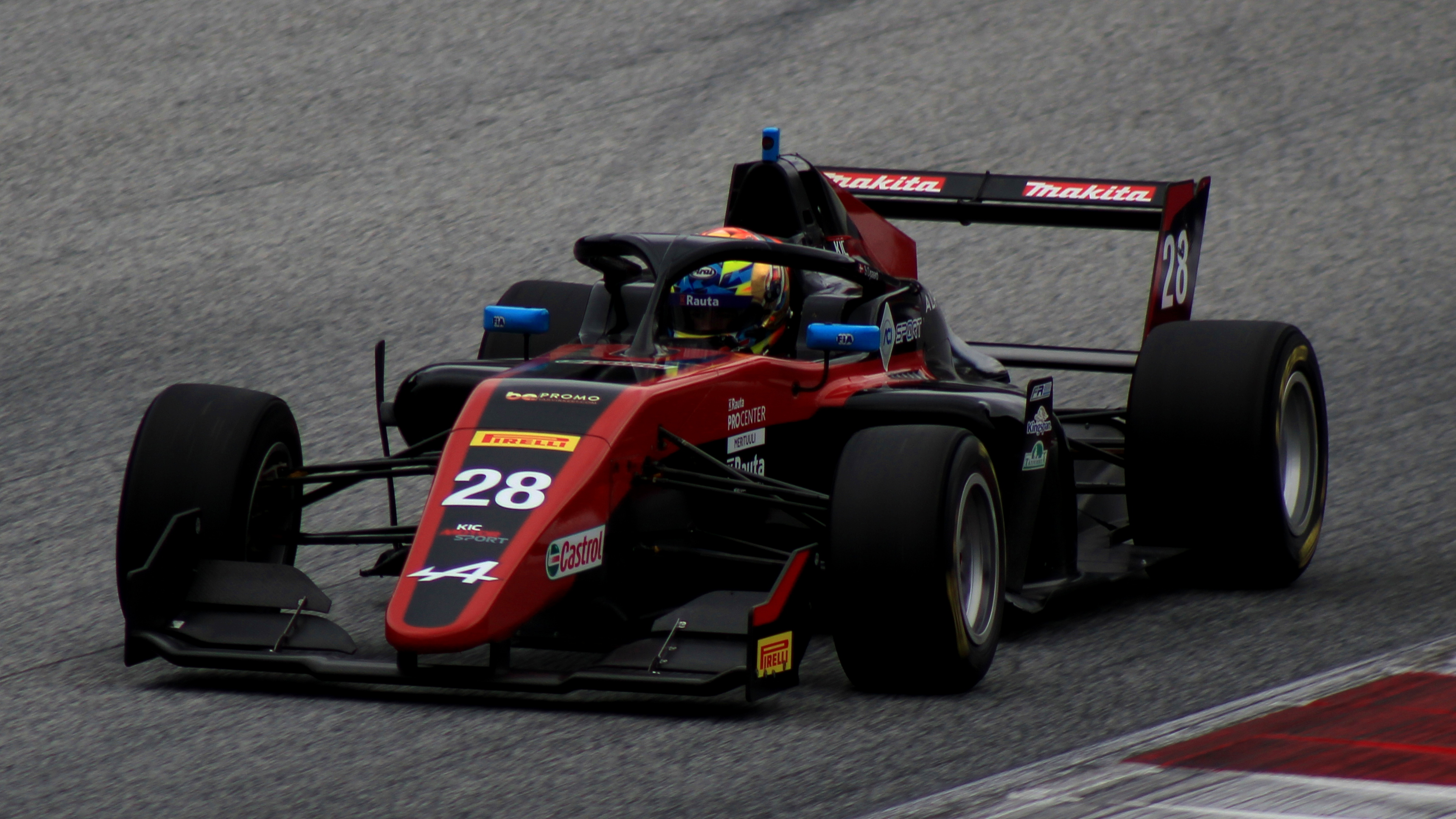
- Øgaard at the Red Bull Ring in 2022
- Nationality: (Denmark) Danish
- Born: Sebastian Øgaard Laursen; 30 January 2004 (age 22) Ejstrupholm, Denmark

GT World Challenge Europe Endurance Cup career
- Debut season: 2024
- Current team: Comtoyou Racing
- Categorisation: FIA Silver
- Car number: 12
- Starts: 1 (1 entry)

Previous series
- 2023 2023 2022 2022 2020 2019, 2021 2019–20: Eurocup-3; FR Middle East Championship; FR European Championship; Euroformula Open Championship; Italian F4 Championship; F4 Spanish Championship; F4 Danish Championship

Sebastian Øgaard Laursen (born 30 January 2004) is a Danish racing driver who currently competed in the GT World Challenge Europe. He is a Team Danmark athlete.

== Career ==
=== Karting ===
Øgaard was voted Karting Driver of the Year in the 2019 Danish Automobile Sports Union (DASU) awards.

=== Lower formulae ===
==== 2019 ====
In 2019, Øgaard made his single-seater debut during the penultimate round of the F4 Danish Championship, competing with FSP. He finished all three races in the points, managing to achieve a best result of sixth in Race 1.

Øgaard also entered as a guest driver into the final round of the F4 Spanish Championship at Barcelona. Competing with MP Motorsport, his best finish was twelfth place in the third race, finishing ahead of full-time teammate Rafael Villanueva Jr. in the process.

==== 2020 ====
Øgaard competed in two of the three rounds of the F4 Danish Championship with Team FSP in 2020. Winning four races and finishing on the podium in five out of six races, he finished third in the championship, 30 points behind the leader and behind two full-time drivers.

Øgaard was a full-time entry with Bhaitech in the 2020 Italian F4 Championship. He scored 12 points over the course of the season and was classified 20th in a field of 44 drivers.

==== 2021 ====
In 2021, Øgaard moved to the F4 Spanish Championship, partnering Pepe Martí, Alex García and Alex Partyshev at Campos Racing. He won five races and finished runner-up in the championship. Consequently, he was voted the 2021 DASU Talent of the Year for asphalt drivers.

=== Euroformula Open ===
Øgaard progressed to the Euroformula Open Championship with Van Amersfoort Racing the following year. In the first four rounds, he recorded two podiums, one of them being a win, and finished every race inside the points. Van Amersfoot Racing withdrew from the series after the fourth round. At that point, Øgaard was fourth in the championship, and he was ultimately classified eighth at the conclusion of the championship despite missing more than half the season.

=== Formula Regional European Championship ===
Øgaard entered the final three rounds of the 2022 Formula Regional European Championship as a guest. Driving for KIC Motorsport, his best finish in six races was twenty-fourth.

=== Formula Regional Middle East Championship ===
Øgaard competed in two rounds of the 2023 Formula Regional Middle East Championship with MP Motorsport (who have entered as Hyderabad Blackbirds powered by MP).

=== Eurocup-3 ===
Øgaard competed in the inaugural 2023 Eurocup-3 season, again with MP Motorsport.

=== Sportscar racing ===
Comtoyou Racing signed Øgaard for the 2024 GT World Challenge Europe Endurance Cup season, and he joined the Aston Martin Racing Driver Academy.

In 2026, Øgaard won the Italian GT World Challenge Europe Endurance Cup round with Tresor Attempto Racing. The result equaled the record for the worst starting position of a winning entry in the GT World Challenge and also marked the first-ever overall win of a silver-rated entry in the endurance competition.

== Racing record ==
=== Racing career summary ===
Season	Series	Team	Races	Wins	Poles	F/Laps	Podiums	Points	Position
2019	F4 Danish Championship	FSP	3	0	0	0	0	20	14th
2019	F4 Spanish Championship	MP Motorsport	3	0	0	0	0	0	NC†
2020	F4 Danish Championship	Team FSP	6	3	0	5	5	121	**3rd**
2020	Italian F4 Championship	Bhaitech	20	0	0	0	0	12	20th
2021	F4 Spanish Championship	Campos Racing	21	5	0	1	8	231	**2nd**
2022	Euroformula Open Championship	Van Amersfoort Racing	11	1	0	0	2	114	8th
2022	Formula Regional European Championship	KIC Motorsport	6	0	0	0	0	0	NC†
2023	Formula Regional Middle East Championship	Hyderabad Blackbirds by MP	6	0	0	0	0	10	24th
2023	Eurocup-3	MP Motorsport	16	1	0	2	7	222	**3rd**
2024	GT World Challenge Europe Endurance Cup	Comtoyou Racing	5	0	0	0	0	0	NC
2024	GT World Challenge Europe Sprint Cup	Comtoyou Racing	2	0	0	0	0	0	NC
2024	GT World Challenge Europe Sprint Cup – Gold	Comtoyou Racing	2	0	0	0	0	12	9th
2025	GT World Challenge Europe Endurance Cup	Tresor Attempto Racing	5	0	0	0	0	10	16th
2025	GT World Challenge Europe Sprint Cup	Tresor Attempto Racing	10	0	0	0	0	0	NC
2025	GT World Challenge Europe Sprint Cup – Gold	Tresor Attempto Racing	10	0	0	3	6	85	5th
2026	GT World Challenge Europe Endurance Cup	Tresor Attempto Racing	5	1	0	0	1	25	9th
2026	GT World Challenge Europe Sprint Cup	Tresor Attempto Racing	8	0	0	0	0	0	NC
2026	Italian GT Championship Endurance Cup - GT3	Tresor Attempto Racing	4	0	0	0	0	0	NC

^{†} As Øgaard was a guest driver, he was ineligible to score points.

* Season still in progress

=== Complete F4 Danish Championship results ===
(key) (Races in bold indicate pole position) (Races in italics indicate fastest lap)

Year	Team	1	2	3	4	5	6	7	8	9	10	11	12	13	14	15	16	17	18	19	20	21	22	23	24	DC	Points
2019	FSP	PAD1; 1	PAD1; 2	PAD1; 3	JYL1; 1	JYL1; 2	JYL1; 3	DJU1; 1	DJU1; 2	DJU1; 3	KIN; 1	KIN; 2	KIN; 3	PAD2; 3	PAD2; 3	PAD2; 3	JYL2; 1	JYL2; 2	JYL2; 3	DJU2; 1; 6	DJU2; 2; 7	DJU2; 3; 7	JYL3; 1	JYL3; 2	JYL3; 3	14th	20
2020	Team FSP	JYL; 1; 5	JYL; 2; 1	JYL; 3; 2	PAD; 1	PAD; 2	PAD; 3	DJU; 1; 2	DJU; 2; 1	DJU; 3; 1																3rd	121

=== Complete F4 Spanish Championship results ===
(key) (Races in bold indicate pole position) (Races in italics indicate fastest lap)

Year	Team	1	2	3	4	5	6	7	8	9	10	11	12	13	14	15	16	17	18	19	20	21	Pos.	Points
2019	MP Motorsport	NAV; 1	NAV; 2	NAV; 3	LEC; 1	LEC; 2	LEC; 3	ARA; 1	ARA; 2	ARA; 3	CRT; 1	CRT; 2	CRT; 3	JER; 1	JER; 2	JER; 3	ALG; 1	ALG; 2	ALG; 3	CAT; 1; 14	CAT; 2; 13	CAT; 3; 12	NC†	0
2021	Campos Racing	SPA; 1; 9	SPA; 2; 3	SPA; 3; 7	NAV; 1; 5	NAV; 2; 22	NAV; 3; 3	ALG; 1; 1	ALG; 2; 1	ALG; 3; 6	ARA; 1; 9	ARA; 2; 3	ARA; 3; 5	CRT; 1; 1	CRT; 2; 4	CRT; 3; 1	JER; 1; 4	JER; 2; 5	JER; 3; 7	CAT; 1; 5	CAT; 2 NC	CAT; 3; 1	2nd	231

† As Øgaard was a guest driver, he was ineligible to score points.

=== Complete Italian F4 Championship results ===
(key) (Races in bold indicate pole position) (Races in italics indicate fastest lap)

Year	Team	1	2	3	4	5	6	7	8	9	10	11	12	13	14	15	16	17	18	19	20	21	Pos.	Points
2020	Bhaitech	MIS; 1 Ret	MIS; 2; 10	MIS; 3; 21†	IMO1; 1; 15	IMO1; 2; 12	IMO1; 3; 15	RBR; 1; 14	RBR; 2; 13	RBR; 3; 14	MUG; 1; 8	MUG; 2; 19	MUG; 3; 15	MNZ; 1; 7	MNZ; 2; 10	MNZ; 3; 15	IMO2; 1 Ret	IMO2; 2 Ret	IMO2; 3 Ret	VLL; 1; 20	VLL; 2 C	VLL; 3; 23	20th	12

=== Complete Euroformula Open Championship results ===
(key) (Races in bold indicate pole position; races in italics indicate points for the fastest lap of top ten finishers)

Year	Entrant	1	2	3	4	5	6	7	8	9	10	11	12	13	14	15	16	17	18	19	20	21	22	23	24	25	26	Pos.	Points
2022	Van Amersfoort Racing	POR; 1; 4	POR; 2; 3	POR; 3; 1	PAU; 1; 7	PAU; 2; 6	LEC; 1; 5	LEC; 2; 8	LEC; 3; 5	SPA; 1; 6	SPA; 2; 5	SPA; 3; 7	HUN; 1	HUN; 2	HUN; 3	IMO; 1	IMO; 2	IMO; 3	RBR; 1	RBR; 2	RBR; 3	MNZ; 1	MNZ; 2	MNZ; 3	CAT; 1	CAT; 2	CAT; 3	8th	114

=== Complete Formula Regional European Championship results ===
(key) (Races in bold indicate pole position) (Races in italics indicate fastest lap)

Year	Team	1	2	3	4	5	6	7	8	9	10	11	12	13	14	15	16	17	18	19	20	Pos.	Points
2022	KIC Motorsport	MNZ; 1	MNZ; 2	IMO; 1	IMO; 2	MCO; 1	MCO; 2	LEC; 1	LEC; 2	ZAN; 1	ZAN; 2	HUN; 1	HUN; 2	SPA; 1	SPA; 1	RBR; 1; 27	RBR; 2; 29	CAT; 1; 27	CAT; 2; 24	MUG; 1; 31‡	MUG; 2; 30	NC†	0

† As Øgaard was a guest driver, he was ineligible to score points.
‡ Did not finish, but classified.

=== Complete Formula Regional Middle East Championship results ===
(key) (Races in bold indicate pole position) (Races in italics indicate fastest lap)

Year	Entrant	1	2	3	4	5	6	7	8	9	10	11	12	13	14	15	DC	Points
2023	Hyderabad Blackbirds by MP Motorsport	DUB1; 1; 7	DUB1; 2; 8	DUB1; 3; 17	KUW1; 1	KUW1; 2	KUW1; 3	KUW2; 1	KUW2; 2	KUW2; 3	DUB2; 1; 19	DUB2; 2; 17	DUB2; 3; 17	ABU; 1	ABU; 2	ABU; 3	24th	10

=== Complete Eurocup-3 results ===
(key) (Races in bold indicate pole position) (Races in italics indicate fastest lap)

Year	Team	1	2	3	4	5	6	7	8	9	10	11	12	13	14	15	16	DC	Points
2023	MP Motorsport	SPA; 1; 5	SPA; 2; 8	ARA; 1; 2	ARA; 2; 4	MNZ; 1; 2	MNZ; 2; 5	ZAN; 1; 2	ZAN; 2; 3	JER; 1; 4	JER; 2; 1	EST; 1; 4	EST; 2; 2	CRT; 1; 5	CRT; 2; 2	CAT; 1; 4	CAT; 2; 6	3rd	222

=== Complete GT World Challenge Europe results ===
==== GT World Challenge Europe Endurance Cup ====
(key) (Races in bold indicate pole position) (Races in italics indicate fastest lap)

Year	Team	Car	Class	1	2	3	4	5	6	7	Pos.	Points
2024	Comtoyou Racing	Aston Martin Vantage AMR GT3 Evo	Silver	LEC; 46	SPA; 6H; 60†	SPA; 12H; Ret	SPA; 24H; Ret	NÜR; 38	MNZ; 15	JED; 23	12th	47
2025	Tresor Attempto Racing	Audi R8 LMS Evo II	Gold	LEC; 21	MNZ; 16	SPA; 6H; 58	SPA; 12H; 44	SPA; 24H; 47†	NÜR; Ret		20th	21
2025	Tresor Attempto Racing	Audi R8 LMS Evo II	Silver							CAT; 5	16th	25
2026	Tresor Attempto Racing	Audi R8 LMS Evo II	Silver	LEC; 21	MNZ; 1	SPA; 6H; 67†	SPA; 12H; 67†	SPA; 24H; Ret	NÜR; 37	ALG; 15	3rd	59

* Season still in progress.

==== GT World Challenge Europe Sprint Cup ====
(key) (Races in bold indicate pole position) (Races in italics indicate fastest lap)

Year	Team	Car	Class	1	2	3	4	5	6	7	8	9	10	Pos.	Points
2024	Comtoyou Racing	Aston Martin Vantage AMR GT3 Evo	Gold	BRH; 1	BRH; 2	MIS; 1	MIS; 2	HOC; 1	HOC; 2	MAG; 1; 32	MAG; 2; 15	CAT; 1	CAT; 2	9th	12
2025	Tresor Attempto Racing	Audi R8 LMS Evo II	Gold	BRH; 1; 14	BRH; 2; 12	ZAN; 1; 17	ZAN; 2; 15	MIS; 1; 25	MIS; 2; 25	MAG; 1; 15	MAG; 2; 15	VAL; 1; 15	VAL; 2; 22	5th	85
2026	Tresor Attempto Racing	Audi R8 LMS Evo II	Bronze	MIS; 1; 39	MIS; 2; 37	MAG; 1; 39	MAG; 2; 33	ZAN; 1; 39	ZAN; 2; 36	CAT; 1; 38	CAT; 2; 34			9th	17
