= Mikkel Grundtvig =

Danish racing driver (born 2002)

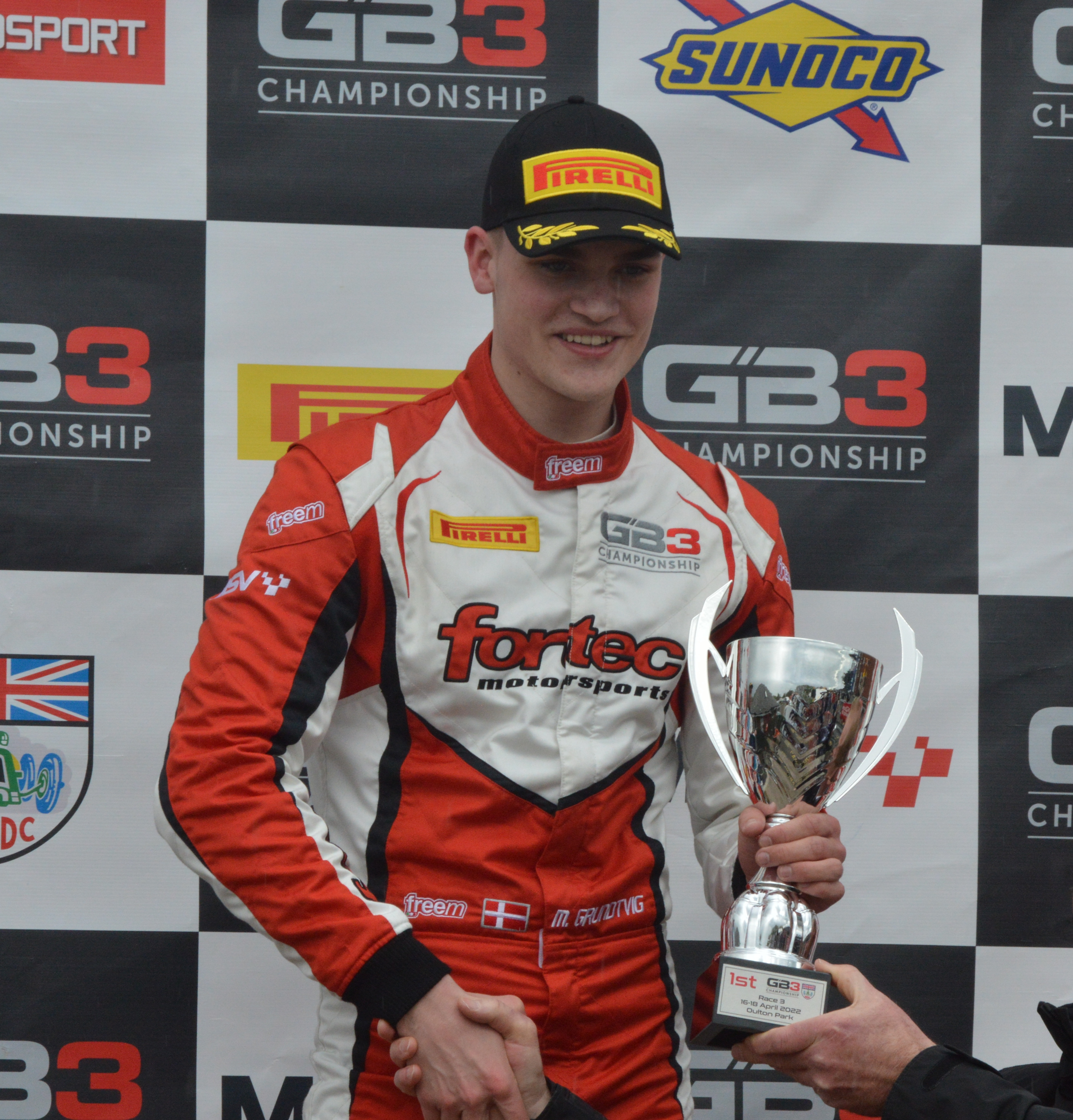
- Grundtvig in 2022
- Nationality: (Denmark) Danish
- Born: Mikkel Küno Møllegaard Laugesen Grundtvig; 30 June 2002 (age 24) Vejle, Denmark

GB3 Championship career
- Debut season: 2021
- Current team: Fortec Motorsport
- Car number: 43
- Starts: 27 (27 entries)
- Wins: 3
- Podiums: 5
- Poles: 0
- Fastest laps: 0
- Best finish: 13th in 2021

Previous series
- 2020 2019 2018-2019 2017: Danish Endurance Championship; French F4 Championship; F4 Danish Championship; Aquila Synergy Cup

Championship titles
- 2020: Danish Endurance Championship - Class 4

Mikkel Küno Møllegaard Laugesen Grundtvig (born 30 June 2002) is a Danish racing driver. He notably competed in the GB3 Championship in 2021 and 2022.

== Career ==
=== Karting ===
Grundtvig started racing in karting competitions in 2015, when he drove in the Danish Rotax Max Challenge. He remained in karts until 2016.

=== Lower formulae ===
In 2017, Grundtvig made his single-seater debut in the Aquila Synergy Cup with Young Factory Racing. The Dane scored his first podium in the second race at Karlskoga, and achieved two victories at the final two races of the season. Grundtvig finished the campaign in third place, 67 points behind the champion Kevin Suenson.

For 2018, Grundtvig progressed to the F4 Danish Championship, driving for Apex Racing. However, despite five podium finishes of the course of the season, he only managed to end up seventh in the standings. Grundtvig remained with Apex for parts of the 2019 season, whilst also competing in the French F4 Championship. The Dane would fare significantly better in the former than the previous year, winning three races and scoring a further five podiums, whilst in the French series he would come out victorious at the reversed-grid race at Lédenon and finished the year 13th in the championship.

=== Danish Touring Cars ===
In 2020, Grundtvig raced in Class 4 of the Danish Endurance Championship. After finishing six of the seven races on the podium and winning a total of three races he won the title in comfortable fashion.

=== GB3 Championship ===
Grundtvig made the step-up to race in the GB3 Championship in 2021, partnering Roberto Faria at Fortec Motorsports. He scored his first podium of the season along with his first win at Donington Park, where he held off Max Marzorati to take victory. At the following round at Spa-Francochamps, he achieved a second place in the reversed-grid race, completing a Fortec one-two lockout along with teammate Faria. Grundtvig's third podium of the campaign came at the final race at Oulton Park, where he yet again finished second. After two 14th places in the first two races at the final round at Donington Park, Grundtvig won the final race of the season, having started from pole position due to the reversing of the qualifying order. He finished the season 13th in the standings, eight positions behind his only full-time teammate Faria.

== Karting record ==
=== Karting career summary ===
Season	Series	Team	Position
2015	Rotax Max Challenge Denmark — Junior		8th
2016	NEZ Championship — KFJ		16th
2016	Danish Championship — KFJ		12th

== Racing record ==
=== Racing career summary ===
Season	Series	Team	Races	Wins	Poles	F/Laps	Podiums	Points	Position
2017	Aquila Synergy Cup	Young Factory Racing	15	2	0	1	8	386	**3rd**
2018	F4 Danish Championship	Apex Racing	22	2	0	1	6	237	7th
2019	French F4 Championship	FFSA Academy	19	1	0	1	1	37	13th
2019	F4 Danish Championship	Apex Racing	12	3	0	2	8	187	7th
2020	Danish Endurance Championship - Class 4	Dream Concept Motorsport	7	3	0	0	6	185	**1st**
2021	GB3 Championship	Fortec Motorsports	24	2	0	0	4	214	13th
2022	GB3 Championship	Fortec Motorsport	18	2	0	0	3	135.5	21st
2023	Super GT Denmark	Outzen Motorsport	18	0	1	0	1	262	9th

* Season still in progress.

=== Complete F4 Danish Championship results ===
(key) (Races in bold indicate pole position) (Races in italics indicate fastest lap)

Year	Team	1	2	3	4	5	6	7	8	9	10	11	12	13	14	15	16	17	18	19	20	21	22	23	24	DC	Points
2018	APEX Racing	PAD1; 1; 5	PAD1; 2; 2	PAD1; 3; 2	JYL1; 1; 6	JYL1; 2; 2	JYL1; 3; 12	DJU; 1; 7	DJU; 2; 5	DJU; 3; 6	RUD; 1 Ret	RUD; 2; 5	RUD; 3; 4	JYL2; 1; 2	JYL2; 2; 8	JYL2; 3; 5	PAD2; 1; 2	PAD2; 2 Ret	PAD2; 3; 4	DJU2; 1 DSQ	DJU2; 2 DSQ	DJU2; 3 DSQ	JYL3; 1; 10	JYL3; 2; 7	JYL3; 3; 4	7th	237
2019	APEX Racing	PAD1; 1; 6	PAD1; 2; 1	PAD1; 3; 1	JYL1; 1; 3	JYL1; 2; 5	JYL1; 3; 2	DJU1; 1	DJU1; 2	DJU1; 3	KIN; 1	KIN; 2	KIN; 3	PAD2; 3; 3	PAD2; 3 Ret	PAD2; 3; 4	JYL2; 1	JYL2; 2	JYL2; 3	DJU2; 1 DNS	DJU2; 2 DNS	DJU2; 3 DNS	JYL3; 1; 2	JYL3; 2; 2	JYL3; 3; 1	7th	187

=== Complete French F4 Championship results ===
(key) (Races in bold indicate pole position) (Races in italics indicate fastest lap)

Year	1	2	3	4	5	6	7	8	9	10	11	12	13	14	15	16	17	18	19	20	21	Pos	Points
2019	NOG; 1; 12	NOG; 2; 11	NOG; 3; 8	PAU; 1 Ret	PAU; 2 Ret	PAU; 3 DNS	SPA; 1; 10	SPA; 2; 10	SPA; 3; 15	LÉD; 1; 10	LÉD; 2; 1	LÉD; 3; 8	HUN; 1; 15	HUN; 2; 13	HUN; 3; 13	MAG; 1; 13	MAG; 2; 13	MAG; 3; 10	LEC; 1; 10	LEC; 2; 9	LEC; 3; 9	13th	37

=== Complete GB3 Championship results ===
(key) (Races in bold indicate pole position) (Races in italics indicate fastest lap)

Year	Entrant	1	2	3	4	5	6	7	8	9	10	11	12	13	14	15	16	17	18	19	20	21	22	23	24	DC	Points
2021	Fortec Motorsports	BRH; 1; 16	BRH; 2; 15	BRH; 3; 5	SIL1; 1; 12	SIL1; 2; 14	SIL1; 3 Ret	DON1; 1; 17	DON1; 2; 13	DON1; 3; 1^{2}	SPA; 1; 14	SPA; 2; 13	SPA; 3; 2^{1}	SNE; 1; 14	SNE; 2; 16	SNE; 3; 9	SIL2; 1; 11	SIL2; 2; 13	SIL2; 3; 10	OUL; 1; 16	OUL; 2; 11	OUL; 3; 2	DON2; 1; 14	DON2; 2; 14	DON2; 3; 1	13th	214
2022	Fortec Motorsport	OUL; 1; 18	OUL; 2; 19	OUL; 3; 1	SIL1; 1; 15	SIL1; 2; 13	SIL1; 3; 15	DON1; 1; 16	DON1; 2; 17	DON1; 3; 3	SNE; 1; 17	SNE; 2; 21	SNE; 3; 1	SPA; 1; 15	SPA; 2; 17	SPA; 3; 7	SIL2; 1; 20	SIL2; 2; 17	SIL2; 3; 8	BRH; 1; 20	BRH; 2; 21	BRH; 3; 15^{3}	DON2; 1; 15	DON2; 2; 17	DON2; 3; 19	21st	135.5

* Season still in progress.
