= 2020 F4 Danish Championship =

Motor racing competition

The 2020 F4 Danish Championship season was the fourth season of the F4 Danish Championship. The season began at Jyllandsringen in June and concluded at Ring Djursland in September.

== Teams and drivers ==
Formula 4 entries
Team	No.	Drivers	Class	Rounds
(Japan) Noda Racing	10	(Japan) Juju Noda	R	All
(Denmark) Team FSP	11	(Denmark) Benjamin Frislund		All
(Denmark) Team FSP	19	(Denmark) Sebastian Øgaard		1, 3
(Denmark) Team FSP	20	(Denmark) Conrad Laursen	R	All
(Denmark) Mads Hoe Motorsport	52	(Denmark) Christoffer Peter Christensen		1–2
Privateer	22	(Denmark) William Wulf		All
Formula 5 entries
(Denmark) Mads Hoe Motorsport	7	(Denmark) Jacob S. Bjerring		All
(Denmark) Mads Hoe Motorsport	47	(Denmark) Mads Hoe		All
(Denmark) Mads Hoe Motorsport	56	(Denmark) Mille Hoe		All
(Denmark) Daugaard Motorsport	25	(Denmark) Lucas Daugaard		All
(Denmark) Sønderskov Motorsport	39	(Denmark) Line Sønderskov		All
(Denmark) Rytteriet	49	(Denmark) Niels Einar Rytter		1, 3
Privateer	7	(Denmark) Brian Steen		1
Privateer	12	(Norway) Tore Sten Nielsen		1
Privateer	30	(Denmark) Klaus Gylvig		1
Privateer	46	(Denmark) Jannik Sadolin		1
Privateer	64	(Denmark) Jørgen Hummeluhr		1
Privateer	84	(Denmark) Ulrik Steen Hansen		1

Icon	Class
R	Rookie

== Calendar ==
The season was initially intended to start Padborg Park on 9 May, but the opening two rounds of the season were ultimately cancelled due to the COVID-19 pandemic. The penultimate round at Padborg Park was cancelled as the authorities withdrew their permission for the event. The final round at Jyllandsringen was removed from the schedule of the race weekend as the organizers had to limit the number of participants due to the COVID-19 pandemic. The finale was rescheduled to take place on 31 October at Sturup Raceway in Sweden but was cancelled following updated travel advice from Denmark's government.

Rnd.		Circuit/Location	Date	Supporting
–		(Denmark) Padborg Park, Padborg	9–10 May	Cancelled
–		(Denmark) Ring Djursland, Pederstrup	6–7 June	Cancelled
1	R1	(Denmark) Jyllandsringen, Silkeborg	20–21 June	TCR Denmark Touring Car Series
1	R2	(Denmark) Jyllandsringen, Silkeborg	20–21 June	TCR Denmark Touring Car Series
1	R3	(Denmark) Jyllandsringen, Silkeborg	20–21 June	TCR Denmark Touring Car Series
2	R1	(Denmark) Padborg Park, Padborg	11–12 September	Super GT Danmark
2	R2	(Denmark) Padborg Park, Padborg	11–12 September	Super GT Danmark
2	R3	(Denmark) Padborg Park, Padborg	11–12 September	Super GT Danmark
3	R1	(Denmark) Ring Djursland, Pederstrup	26–27 September	Super GT Danmark; TCR Denmark Touring Car Series
3	R2	(Denmark) Ring Djursland, Pederstrup	26–27 September	Super GT Danmark; TCR Denmark Touring Car Series
3	R3	(Denmark) Ring Djursland, Pederstrup	26–27 September	Super GT Danmark; TCR Denmark Touring Car Series
–		(Denmark) Padborg Park, Padborg	10–11 October	Cancelled
–		(Denmark) Jyllandsringen, Silkeborg	23–25 October	Cancelled
–		(Sweden) Sturup Raceway, Svedala	30–31 October	Cancelled

== Race results ==
Rnd.		Circuit	Formula 4			Formula 5
Rnd.		Circuit	Pole position	Fastest lap	Winning driver	Winning driver
1	R1	(Denmark) Jyllandsringen	(Japan) Juju Noda (Note: Conrad Laursen set the fastest lap during qualifying, but had his lap removed as he violated yellow flag conditions.)	(Japan) Juju Noda	(Japan) Juju Noda	(Denmark) Mads Hoe
1	R2	(Denmark) Jyllandsringen		(Denmark) Sebastian Øgaard	(Denmark) Sebastian Øgaard	(Denmark) Mads Hoe
1	R3	(Denmark) Jyllandsringen		(Denmark) Sebastian Øgaard	(Denmark) Conrad Laursen	(Denmark) Mads Hoe
2	R1	(Denmark) Padborg Park	(Japan) Juju Noda	(Denmark) Benjamin Frislund	(Denmark) Benjamin Frislund	(Denmark) Lucas Daugaard
2	R2	(Denmark) Padborg Park		(Japan) Juju Noda	(Denmark) William Wulf	(Denmark) Jacob S. Bjerring
2	R3	(Denmark) Padborg Park		(Denmark) Benjamin Frislund (Note: Mads Hoe set the fastest lap overall in F5 machinery.)	(Denmark) Conrad Laursen	(Denmark) Mads Hoe
3	R1	(Denmark) Ring Djursland	(Japan) Juju Noda	(Denmark) Sebastian Øgaard (Note: Mads Hoe set the fastest lap overall in F5 machinery.)	(Denmark) Sebastian Øgaard	(Denmark) Mads Hoe (Note: Mads Hoe was the overall winner of the race in F5 machinery.)
3	R2	(Denmark) Ring Djursland		(Denmark) Sebastian Øgaard	(Denmark) Sebastian Øgaard	(Denmark) Jacob S. Bjerring
3	R3	(Denmark) Ring Djursland		(Denmark) Sebastian Øgaard	(Denmark) Sebastian Øgaard	(Denmark) Mads Hoe

== Championship standings ==
Points are awarded to the top 10 classified finishers in each race. No points are awarded for pole position or fastest lap.

Position	**1st**	**2nd**	**3rd**	**4th**	**5th**	**6th**	**7th**	**8th**	**9th**	**10th**
Points	25	18	15	12	10	8	6	4	2	1

=== Drivers' standings ===
Pos	Driver	JYL (Denmark)			PAD (Denmark)			DJU (Denmark)			Pts
1	(Denmark) Conrad Laursen **(R)**	2	3	1	2	3	1	6	3	4	151
2	(Denmark) Benjamin Frislund	4	5	5	1	5	2	4	2	2	133
3	(Denmark) Sebastian Øgaard	5	1	2				2	1	1	121
4	(Denmark) Mads Hoe **(F5)**	3	4	3	8	Ret	3	1	Ret	3	101
5	(Denmark) William Wulf	6	2	Ret	5	1	5	3	4	10†	99
6	(Japan) Juju Noda **(R)**	**1**	DSQ	4	**3**	2	6	**10**	7	11†	85
7	(Denmark) Lucas Daugaard **(F5)**	7	7	6	4	6	DNS	5	6	6	66
8	(Denmark) Jacob Bjerring **(F5)**	8	6	Ret	DSQ	4	7	7	5	5	56
9	(Denmark) Christoffer Peter Christensen	12	8	7	7	Ret	4				28
10	(Denmark) Line Sønderskov **(F5)**	14	11	11	6	7	8	8	10	8	27
11	(Denmark) Niels Einar Rytter **(F5)**	11	12	10				9	8	7	13
12	(Denmark) Brian Steen **(F5)**	10	9	8							7
13	(Denmark) Mille Hoe **(F5)**	WD	13	12	Ret	DNS	DNS	11	9	9	4
14	(Denmark) Jannick Sadolin **(F5)**	13	10	9							3
15	(Denmark) Ulrik Steen Hansen **(F5)**	9	Ret	DNS							2
16	(Denmark) Klaus Gylvig **(F5)**	15	14	13							0
17	(Norway) Tore Sten Nielsen **(F5)**	17	15	14							0
18	(Denmark) Jørgen Hummeluhr **(F5)**	16	16	15							0
Pos	Driver	JYL (Denmark)			PAD (Denmark)			DJU (Denmark)			Pts

Colour	Result
Gold	Winner
Silver	Second place
Bronze	Third place
Green	Points classification
Blue	Non-points classification
Blue	Non-classified finish (NC)
Purple	Retired, not classified (Ret)
Red	Did not qualify (DNQ)
Red	Did not pre-qualify (DNPQ)
Black	Disqualified (DSQ)
White	Did not start (DNS)
White	Withdrew (WD)
White	Race cancelled (C)
Blank	Did not practice (DNP)
Blank	Did not arrive (DNA)
Blank	Excluded (EX)

**Bold** – Pole
Italics – Fastest Lap

- † – Driver did not finish the race, but was classified as they completed over 75% of the race distance.

=== Teams' championship ===
Pos	Team	Points
**Formula 4**
1	Team FSP	405
2	Noda Racing	85
3	Mads Hoe Motorsport	28
