= 2018 F4 Danish Championship =

Motor racing competition

The 2018 F4 Danish Championship season was the second season of the F4 Danish Championship. The season began at Padborg Park in April and concluded at Jyllandsringen in October.

== Teams and drivers ==
All teams were Danish-registered.

Formula 4 entries
Team	No.	Drivers	Class	Rounds
FSP (Note: For points-scoring purposes, FSP is divided into two teams: with car #4 and #8 scoring points as "FSP", and car #14 scoring points as "FSP.".)	4	(Denmark) Casper Tobias Hansen		All
FSP	8	(Denmark) Malthe Jakobsen	R	All
FSP	14	(Denmark) Aske Nygaard Bramming		All
FSP	80	(Belgium) Michelangelo Amendola	R	8
Pilgaard Motorsport	5	(Denmark) Casper Pilgaard		All
Magnussen Racing Experience	6	(India) Brad Dias		1–3
Magnussen Racing Experience	7	(Denmark) Frederik Kikkenborg	R	1–4
APEX Racing	43	(Denmark) Mikkel Grundtvig		All
Lindhard Motorsport	67	(Denmark) Jonas Lindhard Nielsen		All
Valdemar Eriksen Racing	85	(Denmark) Valdemar Eriksen		All
Formula 5 entries
Privateer	11	(Denmark) Rask Ingemann Lambertsen	R	1–5, 7–8
FSP	16	(Denmark) Martin Harritz Nielsen		All
Daugaard Racing	25	(Denmark) Lucas Daugaard	R	All
Sønderskov Motorsport	39	(Denmark) Line Sønderskov Abildgaard		All
Hoe Motorsport	47	(Denmark) Mads Hoe		All
Hoe Motorsport	48	(Denmark) Jørgen Løjborg Jensen		4
Hoe Motorsport	49	(Denmark) Niels Ejnar Rytter		5, 7
SRT Motorsport	94	(Denmark) Jesper Nyvang Pedersen		1

Icon	Class
R	Rookie

== Calendar and results ==
Rnd.		Circuit/Location	Date	Supporting
1	R1	(Denmark) Padborg Park, Padborg	21 April	Danish Supertourisme Turbo
1	R2	(Denmark) Padborg Park, Padborg	21 April	Danish Supertourisme Turbo
1	R3	(Denmark) Padborg Park, Padborg	22 April	Danish Supertourisme Turbo
2	R1	(Denmark) Jyllandsringen, Silkeborg	12 May	Danish Thundersport Championship
2	R2	(Denmark) Jyllandsringen, Silkeborg	13 May	Danish Thundersport Championship
2	R3	(Denmark) Jyllandsringen, Silkeborg	13 May	Danish Thundersport Championship
3	R1	(Denmark) Ring Djursland, Pederstrup	9–10 June	Danish Thundersport Championship
3	R2	(Denmark) Ring Djursland, Pederstrup	9–10 June	Danish Thundersport Championship
3	R3	(Denmark) Ring Djursland, Pederstrup	9–10 June	Danish Thundersport Championship
4	R1	(Norway) Rudskogen Motorpark, Rakkestad	13–15 July	Danish Thundersport Championship
4	R2	(Norway) Rudskogen Motorpark, Rakkestad	13–15 July	Danish Thundersport Championship
4	R3	(Norway) Rudskogen Motorpark, Rakkestad	13–15 July	Danish Thundersport Championship
5	R1	(Denmark) Jyllandsringen, Silkeborg	24–26 August	Danish Thundersport Championship
5	R2	(Denmark) Jyllandsringen, Silkeborg	24–26 August	Danish Thundersport Championship
5	R3	(Denmark) Jyllandsringen, Silkeborg	24–26 August	Danish Thundersport Championship
6	R1	(Denmark) Padborg Park, Padborg	1 September	Danish Supertourisme Turbo
6	R2	(Denmark) Padborg Park, Padborg	1 September	Danish Supertourisme Turbo
6	R3	(Denmark) Padborg Park, Padborg	1 September	Danish Supertourisme Turbo
7	R1	(Denmark) Ring Djursland, Pederstrup	22–23 September	Danish Supertourisme Turbo
7	R2	(Denmark) Ring Djursland, Pederstrup	22–23 September	Danish Supertourisme Turbo
7	R3	(Denmark) Ring Djursland, Pederstrup	22–23 September	Danish Supertourisme Turbo
8	R1	(Denmark) Jyllandsringen, Silkeborg	6–7 October	Danish Thundersport Championship
8	R2	(Denmark) Jyllandsringen, Silkeborg	6–7 October	Danish Thundersport Championship
8	R3	(Denmark) Jyllandsringen, Silkeborg	6–7 October	Danish Thundersport Championship

== Race results ==
Rnd.		Circuit	Formula 4			Formula 5		
Rnd.		Circuit	Pole position	Fastest lap	Winning driver	Pole position	Fastest lap	Winning driver
1	R1	Padborg Park	(Denmark) Casper Tobias Hansen	(Denmark) Casper Tobias Hansen	(Denmark) Casper Tobias Hansen	(Denmark) Martin Harritz	(Denmark) Martin Harritz	(Denmark) Martin Harritz
1	R2	Padborg Park		(Denmark) Casper Tobias Hansen	(Denmark) Mikkel Grundtvig		(Denmark) Mads Hoe	(Denmark) Martin Harritz
1	R3	Padborg Park		(Denmark) Casper Tobias Hansen	(Denmark) Casper Tobias Hansen		(Denmark) Martin Harritz	(Denmark) Martin Harritz
2	R1	Jyllandsringen	(Denmark) Casper Pilgaard	(Denmark) Casper Pilgaard	(Denmark) Casper Pilgaard	(Denmark) Mads Hoe	(Denmark) Mads Hoe	(Denmark) Mads Hoe
2	R2	Jyllandsringen		(Denmark) Casper Tobias Hansen	(Denmark) Casper Tobias Hansen		(Denmark) Mads Hoe	(Denmark) Mads Hoe
2	R3	Jyllandsringen		(Denmark) Aske Nygaard Bramming	(Denmark) Casper Tobias Hansen		(Denmark) Mads Hoe	(Denmark) Mads Hoe
3	R1	Ring Djursland	(Denmark) Casper Tobias Hansen	(Denmark) Casper Tobias Hansen	(Denmark) Casper Tobias Hansen	(Denmark) Martin Harritz	(Denmark) Mads Hoe	(Denmark) Martin Harritz
3	R2	Ring Djursland		(Denmark) Casper Tobias Hansen	(Denmark) Jonas Lindhard Nielsen		(Denmark) Mads Hoe	(Denmark) Mads Hoe
3	R3	Ring Djursland		(Denmark) Casper Tobias Hansen	(Denmark) Aske Nygaard Bramming		(Denmark) Mads Hoe	(Denmark) Martin Harritz
4	R1	Rudskogen Motorpark	(Denmark) Casper Tobias Hansen	(Denmark) Casper Tobias Hansen	(Denmark) Casper Tobias Hansen	(Denmark) Martin Harritz	(Denmark) Martin Harritz	(Denmark) Martin Harritz
4	R2	Rudskogen Motorpark		(Denmark) Aske Nygaard Bramming	(Denmark) Frederik Kikkenborg		(Denmark) Mads Hoe	(Denmark) Mads Hoe
4	R3	Rudskogen Motorpark		(Denmark) Casper Pilgaard	(Denmark) Casper Pilgaard		(Denmark) Mads Hoe	(Denmark) Mads Hoe
5	R1	Jyllandsringen	(Denmark) Casper Pilgaard	(Denmark) Casper Pilgaard	(Denmark) Mikkel Grundtvig	(Denmark) Mads Hoe	(Denmark) Mads Hoe	(Denmark) Mads Hoe
5	R2	Jyllandsringen		(Denmark) Casper Pilgaard	(Denmark) Casper Pilgaard		(Denmark) Mads Hoe	(Denmark) Martin Harritz
5	R3	Jyllandsringen		(Denmark) Aske Nygaard Bramming	(Denmark) Aske Nygaard Bramming		(Denmark) Mads Hoe	(Denmark) Mads Hoe
6	R1	Padborg Park	(Denmark) Casper Tobias Hansen	(Denmark) Casper Tobias Hansen	(Denmark) Casper Tobias Hansen	(Denmark) Mads Hoe	(Denmark) Martin Harritz	(Denmark) Mads Hoe
6	R2	Padborg Park		(Denmark) Casper Pilgaard	(Denmark) Casper Pilgaard		(Denmark) Mads Hoe	(Denmark) Mads Hoe
6	R3	Padborg Park		(Denmark) Mikkel Grundtvig	(Denmark) Casper Tobias Hansen		(Denmark) Martin Harritz	(Denmark) Martin Harritz
7	R1	Ring Djursland	(Denmark) Malthe Jakobsen	(Denmark) Casper Tobias Hansen	(Denmark) Casper Tobias Hansen	(Denmark) Martin Harritz	(Denmark) Martin Harritz	(Denmark) Mads Hoe
7	R2	Ring Djursland		(Denmark) Casper Tobias Hansen	(Denmark) Casper Pilgaard		(Denmark) Mads Hoe	(Denmark) Mads Hoe
7	R3	Ring Djursland		(Denmark) Casper Tobias Hansen	(Denmark) Casper Tobias Hansen		(Denmark) Martin Harritz	(Denmark) Mads Hoe
8	R1	Jyllandsringen	(Denmark) Casper Tobias Hansen	(Denmark) Casper Pilgaard	(Denmark) Casper Tobias Hansen	(Denmark) Mads Hoe	(Denmark) Mads Hoe	(Denmark) Mads Hoe
8	R2	Jyllandsringen		(Denmark) Casper Pilgaard	(Denmark) Casper Tobias Hansen		(Denmark) Martin Harritz	(Denmark) Mads Hoe
8	R3	Jyllandsringen		(Denmark) Casper Tobias Hansen	(Denmark) Casper Tobias Hansen		(Denmark) Lucas Daugaard	(Denmark) Martin Harritz

== Championship standings ==
Points are awarded to the top 10 classified finishers in each race. No points are awarded for pole position or fastest lap.

Position	**1st**	**2nd**	**3rd**	**4th**	**5th**	**6th**	**7th**	**8th**	**9th**	**10th**
Points	25	18	15	12	10	8	6	4	2	1

=== Drivers' standings ===
Pos	Driver	PAD1 (Denmark)			JYL1 (Denmark)			DJU1 (Denmark)			RUD (Norway)			JYL2 (Denmark)			PAD2 (Denmark)			DJU2 (Denmark)			JYL3 (Denmark)			Pts
**Formula 4**
1	(Denmark) Casper Tobias Hansen	**1**	3	1	3	1	**1**	1	2	**5**	1	Ret	10	5	3	3	**1**	6	1	1	6	1	**1**	1	1	461
2	(Denmark) Casper Pilgaard	DNS	Ret	3	**1**	Ret	6	2	Ret	DNS	3	4	1	**9**	1	2	10	1	2	2	3	2	2	2	2	342
3	(Denmark) Aske Nygaard Bramming	Ret	9	7	2	3	2	3	7	1	2	11	Ret	3	4	1	4	9	5	6	5	Ret	11	4	3	276
4	(Denmark) Valdemar Eriksen	2	Ret	4	9	6	5	4	3	7	4	13	5	8	2	6	6	3	6	4	4	8	7	3	5	265
5	(Denmark) Jonas Lindhard Nielsen	4	4	DSQ	4	8	3	8	1	2	5	3	2	10	6	7	7	2	8	5	DSQ	7	5	Ret	6	251
6	(Denmark) Malthe Jakobsen	6	8	5	5	Ret	9	5	12	8	11	6	7	5	5	4	3	4	3	**3**	7	4	4	5	7	238
7	(Denmark) Mikkel Grundtvig	5	2	2	6	2	12	7	5	6	Ret	5	4	2	8	5	2	Ret	4	DSQ	DSQ	DSQ	10	7	4	237
8	(Denmark) Frederik Kikkenborg	7	5	6	7	5	7	12	6	Ret	7	2	6													107
9	(India) Brad Dias	3	6	DSQ	10	10	11	10	9	9																53
10	(Belgium) Michelangelo Amendola																						6	10	12	24
**Formula 5**
1	(Denmark) Mads Hoe	Ret	7	DNS	**8**	4	4	9	4	4	8	1	3	**1**	9	8	**5**	6	11	7	1	3	**3**	6	Ret	477
2	(Denmark) Martin Harritz	**8**	1	8	DNS	7	Ret	**6**	8	3	**6**	7	Ret	4	7	9	8	7	7	**8**	2	5	9	8	8	438
3	(Denmark) Lucas Daugaard	Ret	12	DNS	11	9	8	11	DNS	10	9	8	8	Ret	10	10	9	8	9	9	8	6	8	Ret	9	298
4	(Denmark) Line Sønderskov	9	10	DNS	12	11	10	13	10	Ret	13	10	9	7	12	11	11	10	10	10	9	9	12	9	10	289
5	(Denmark) Rask Ingemann Lambertsen	DNS	13	DNS	13†	12	13†	Ret	11	Ret	12	12	DNS	DNS	DNS	DNS				DNS	11	11	Ret	DSQ	11	112
6	(Denmark) Niels Ejnar Rytter													11	11	12				11	10	10				64
7	(Denmark) Jørgen Løjborg Jensen										10	9	DNS													24
8	(Denmark) Jesper Nyvang Pedersen	DNS	11†	DNS																						12
Pos	Driver	PAD1 (Denmark)			JYL1 (Denmark)			DJU1 (Denmark)			RUD (Norway)			JYL2 (Denmark)			PAD2 (Denmark)			DJU2 (Denmark)			JYL3 (Denmark)			Pts

Colour	Result
Gold	Winner
Silver	Second place
Bronze	Third place
Green	Points classification
Blue	Non-points classification
Blue	Non-classified finish (NC)
Purple	Retired, not classified (Ret)
Red	Did not qualify (DNQ)
Red	Did not pre-qualify (DNPQ)
Black	Disqualified (DSQ)
White	Did not start (DNS)
White	Withdrew (WD)
White	Race cancelled (C)
Blank	Did not practice (DNP)
Blank	Did not arrive (DNA)
Blank	Excluded (EX)

**Bold** – Pole
Italics – Fastest Lap

Notes:

- † – Drivers did not finish the race, but were classified as they completed over 75% of the race distance.

=== Teams' championship ===
Pos	Team	Points
**Formula 4**
1	FSP	699
2	Pilgaard Motorsport	342
3	FSP.	276
4	Valdemar Eriksen Racing	265
5	Lindhard Motorsport	251
6	APEX Racing	237
7	Magnussen Racing Experience	160
