= 2019 F4 Danish Championship =

Motor racing competition

The 2019 F4 Danish Championship season was the third season of the F4 Danish Championship. The season began at Padborg Park in April and concluded at Jyllandsringen in October.

== Teams and drivers ==
All teams and drivers were Danish-registered.

Formula 4 entries
Team	No.	Drivers	Class	Rounds
Pilgaard Motorsport	5	Casper Pilgaard		4
FSP	8	Malthe Jakobsen		2–8
FSP	80	Sebastian Øgaard		7
FSP	99	Largim Ali	R	All
APEX Racing	43	Mikkel Grundtvig		1–2, 5, 7–8
Mads Hoe Motorsport	47	Mads Hoe		All
Lindhard Motorsport	67	Jonas Lindhard Nielsen		All
Valdemar Eriksen Racing	85	Valdemar Eriksen		1–2, 4–5, 7-8
Formula 5 entries
Daugaard Racing	25	Lucas Daugaard		All
Sønderskov Motorsport	39	Line Sønderskov		1, 5–7
Privateer	49	Niels-Ejnar Rytter		1, 3, 7
Mads Hoe Motorsport	7	Jacob Bjerring	R	5–8
Mads Hoe Motorsport	52	Christoffer Christensen	R	1–4
Mads Hoe Motorsport	56	Mille Hoe	R	2–8

Icon	Class
R	Rookie

== Calendar ==
Rnd.		Circuit/Location	Date	Supporting
1	R1	(Denmark) Padborg Park, Padborg	27–28 April	Super GT Danmark; Danish Endurance Championship
1	R2	(Denmark) Padborg Park, Padborg	27–28 April	Super GT Danmark; Danish Endurance Championship
1	R3	(Denmark) Padborg Park, Padborg	27–28 April	Super GT Danmark; Danish Endurance Championship
2	R1	(Denmark) Jyllandsringen, Silkeborg	8–9 June	Danish Thundersport Championship; Super GT Danmark
2	R2	(Denmark) Jyllandsringen, Silkeborg	8–9 June	Danish Thundersport Championship; Super GT Danmark
2	R3	(Denmark) Jyllandsringen, Silkeborg	8–9 June	Danish Thundersport Championship; Super GT Danmark
3	R1	(Denmark) Ring Djursland, Pederstrup	22–23 June	Super GT Danmark; Danish Endurance Championship
3	R2	(Denmark) Ring Djursland, Pederstrup	22–23 June	Super GT Danmark; Danish Endurance Championship
3	R3	(Denmark) Ring Djursland, Pederstrup	22–23 June	Super GT Danmark; Danish Endurance Championship
4	R1	(Sweden) Kinnekulle Ring, Kinnekulle	26–28 July	
4	R2	(Sweden) Kinnekulle Ring, Kinnekulle	26–28 July	
4	R3	(Sweden) Kinnekulle Ring, Kinnekulle	26–28 July	
5	R1	(Denmark) Padborg Park, Padborg	24–25 August	Super GT Danmark; Danish Endurance Championship
5	R2	(Denmark) Padborg Park, Padborg	24–25 August	Super GT Danmark; Danish Endurance Championship
5	R3	(Denmark) Padborg Park, Padborg	24–25 August	Super GT Danmark; Danish Endurance Championship
6	R1	(Denmark) Jyllandsringen, Silkeborg	6–8 September	Danish Thundersport Championship
6	R2	(Denmark) Jyllandsringen, Silkeborg	6–8 September	Danish Thundersport Championship
6	R3	(Denmark) Jyllandsringen, Silkeborg	6–8 September	Danish Thundersport Championship
7	R1	(Denmark) Ring Djursland, Pederstrup	21–22 September	Danish Thundersport Championship
7	R2	(Denmark) Ring Djursland, Pederstrup	21–22 September	Danish Thundersport Championship
7	R3	(Denmark) Ring Djursland, Pederstrup	21–22 September	Danish Thundersport Championship
8	R1	(Denmark) Jyllandsringen, Silkeborg	5–6 October	Danish Thundersport Championship
8	R2	(Denmark) Jyllandsringen, Silkeborg	5–6 October	Danish Thundersport Championship
8	R3	(Denmark) Jyllandsringen, Silkeborg	5–6 October	Danish Thundersport Championship

== Race results ==
Rnd.		Circuit	Formula 4			Formula 5		
Rnd.		Circuit	Pole position	Fastest lap	Winning driver	Pole position	Fastest lap	Winning driver
1	R1	Padborg Park	Valdemar Eriksen	Mikkel Grundtvig	Mads Hoe	Lucas Daugaard	Lucas Daugaard	Lucas Daugaard
1	R2	Padborg Park		Mads Hoe	Mikkel Grundtvig		Lucas Daugaard	Lucas Daugaard
1	R3	Padborg Park		Mikkel Grundtvig	Mikkel Grundtvig		Christoffer Christensen	Lucas Daugaard
2	R1	Jyllandsringen	Valdemar Eriksen	Valdemar Eriksen	Valdemar Eriksen	Lucas Daugaard	Lucas Daugaard	Lucas Daugaard
2	R2	Jyllandsringen		Malthe Jakobsen	Jonas Lindhard Nielsen		Lucas Daugaard	Lucas Daugaard
2	R3	Jyllandsringen		Malthe Jakobsen	Malthe Jakobsen		Lucas Daugaard	Lucas Daugaard
3	R1	Ring Djursland	Malthe Jakobsen	Jonas Lindhard Nielsen	Malthe Jakobsen	Lucas Daugaard	Lucas Daugaard	Lucas Daugaard
3	R2	Ring Djursland		Largim Ali	Largim Ali		Lucas Daugaard	Lucas Daugaard
3	R3	Ring Djursland		Malthe Jakobsen	Malthe Jakobsen		Lucas Daugaard	Lucas Daugaard
4	R1	Kinnekulle Ring	Malthe Jakobsen	Jonas Lindhard Nielsen	Malthe Jakobsen	Lucas Daugaard	Lucas Daugaard	Christoffer Christensen
4	R2	Kinnekulle Ring		Jonas Lindhard Nielsen	Jonas Lindhard Nielsen		Lucas Daugaard	Christoffer Christensen
4	R3	Kinnekulle Ring		Jonas Lindhard Nielsen	Malthe Jakobsen		Lucas Daugaard	Lucas Daugaard
5	R1	Padborg Park	Malthe Jakobsen	Malthe Jakobsen	Malthe Jakobsen	Lucas Daugaard	Lucas Daugaard	Lucas Daugaard
5	R2	Padborg Park		Malthe Jakobsen	Malthe Jakobsen		Lucas Daugaard	Lucas Daugaard
5	R3	Padborg Park		Valdemar Eriksen	Malthe Jakobsen		Lucas Daugaard	Lucas Daugaard
6	R1	Jyllandsringen	Malthe Jakobsen	Jonas Lindhard Nielsen	Malthe Jakobsen	Jacob Bjerring	Lucas Daugaard	Lucas Daugaard
6	R2	Jyllandsringen		Largim Ali	Largim Ali		Lucas Daugaard	Lucas Daugaard
6	R3	Jyllandsringen		Malthe Jakobsen	Malthe Jakobsen		Lucas Daugaard	Lucas Daugaard
7	R1	Ring Djursland	Malthe Jakobsen	Valdemar Eriksen	Valdemar Eriksen	Lucas Daugaard	Lucas Daugaard	Lucas Daugaard
7	R2	Ring Djursland		Jonas Lindhard Nielsen	Mads Hoe		Lucas Daugaard	Lucas Daugaard
7	R3	Ring Djursland		Valdemar Eriksen	Malthe Jakobsen		Lucas Daugaard	Lucas Daugaard
8	R1	Jyllandsringen	Malthe Jakobsen	Valdemar Eriksen	Valdemar Eriksen	Lucas Daugaard	Lucas Daugaard	Lucas Daugaard
8	R2	Jyllandsringen		Mads Hoe	Jonas Lindhard Nielsen		Lucas Daugaard	Lucas Daugaard
8	R3	Jyllandsringen		Mads Hoe	Mikkel Grundtvig		Lucas Daugaard	Lucas Daugaard

== Championship standings ==
Points were awarded to the top 10 classified finishers in each race. No points were awarded for pole position or fastest lap.

Position	**1st**	**2nd**	**3rd**	**4th**	**5th**	**6th**	**7th**	**8th**	**9th**	**10th**
Points	25	18	15	12	10	8	6	4	2	1

=== Drivers' standings ===
Pos	Driver	PAD1 (Denmark)			JYL1 (Denmark)			DJU1 (Denmark)			KIN (Sweden)			PAD2 (Denmark)			JYL2 (Denmark)			DJU2 (Denmark)			JYL3 (Denmark)			Pts
1	Malthe Jakobsen				2	3	1	**1**	4	1	**1**	3	1	**1**	1	1	**1**	4	1	**2**	2	1	**3**	4	2	428
2	Jonas Lindhard Nielsen	3	5	2	4	1	3	2	3	2	3	1	3	4	2	3	2	2	4	10†	5	5	5	1	DSQ	350
3	Mads Hoe	1	2	4	Ret	2	4	3	2	4	7	Ret	4	5	7	5	3	3	Ret	5	1	4	9	3	3	283
4	Valdemar Eriksen	2	3	3	**1**	6	8†				2	2	2	2	4	2				1	4	2	1	5	DSQ	275
5	Largim Ali **(R)**	4	7	5	6	DSQ	Ret	4	1	3	Ret	DNS	DNS	6	3	8	4	1	2	3	3	3	4	9	4	251
6	Lucas Daugaard **(F5)**	5	4	6	5	4	5	5	5	5	6	6	6	7	5	6	5	5	3	4	6	6	6	6	5	203
7	Mikkel Grundtvig	**6**	1	1	3	5	2							3	Ret	4				DNS	DNS	DNS	2	2	1	187
8	Christoffer Christensen **(F5) (R)**	8	6	8	7	7	6	7	6	6	5	4	7													84
9	Mille Hoe **(F5) (R)**				8	8	7	8	8	8	8	7	8	9	9	9	7	8	7	9	10	9	8	8	7	79
10	Jacob Bjerring **(F5) (R)**													8	6	7	Ret	6	5	Ret	8	8	7	7	6	64
11	Niels-Ejnar Rytter **(F5)**	7	8	7				6	7	7										7	9	Ret				36
12	Line Sønderskov **(F5)**	9	9	9										Ret	8	Ret	6	7	6	8	Ret	10				37
13	Casper Pilgaard										4	5	5													32
14	Sebastian Øgaard																			6	7	7				20
Pos	Driver	PAD1 (Denmark)			JYL1 (Denmark)			DJU1 (Denmark)			KIN (Sweden)			PAD2 (Denmark)			JYL2 (Denmark)			DJU2 (Denmark)			JYL3 (Denmark)			Pts

Colour	Result
Gold	Winner
Silver	Second place
Bronze	Third place
Green	Points classification
Blue	Non-points classification
Blue	Non-classified finish (NC)
Purple	Retired, not classified (Ret)
Red	Did not qualify (DNQ)
Red	Did not pre-qualify (DNPQ)
Black	Disqualified (DSQ)
White	Did not start (DNS)
White	Withdrew (WD)
White	Race cancelled (C)
Blank	Did not practice (DNP)
Blank	Did not arrive (DNA)
Blank	Excluded (EX)

**Bold** – Pole
Italics – Fastest Lap

=== Teams' championship ===
Pos	Team	Points
**Formula 4**
1	FSP	679
2	Lindhard Motorsport	350
3	Mads Hoe Motorsport	283
4	Valdemar Eriksen Racing	275
5	APEX Racing	187
6	Pilgaard Motorsport	32

Notes:

- † – Drivers did not finish the race, but were classified as they completed over 75% of the race distance.
