= Kong Svends Høj =

Neolithic passage grave in Denmark

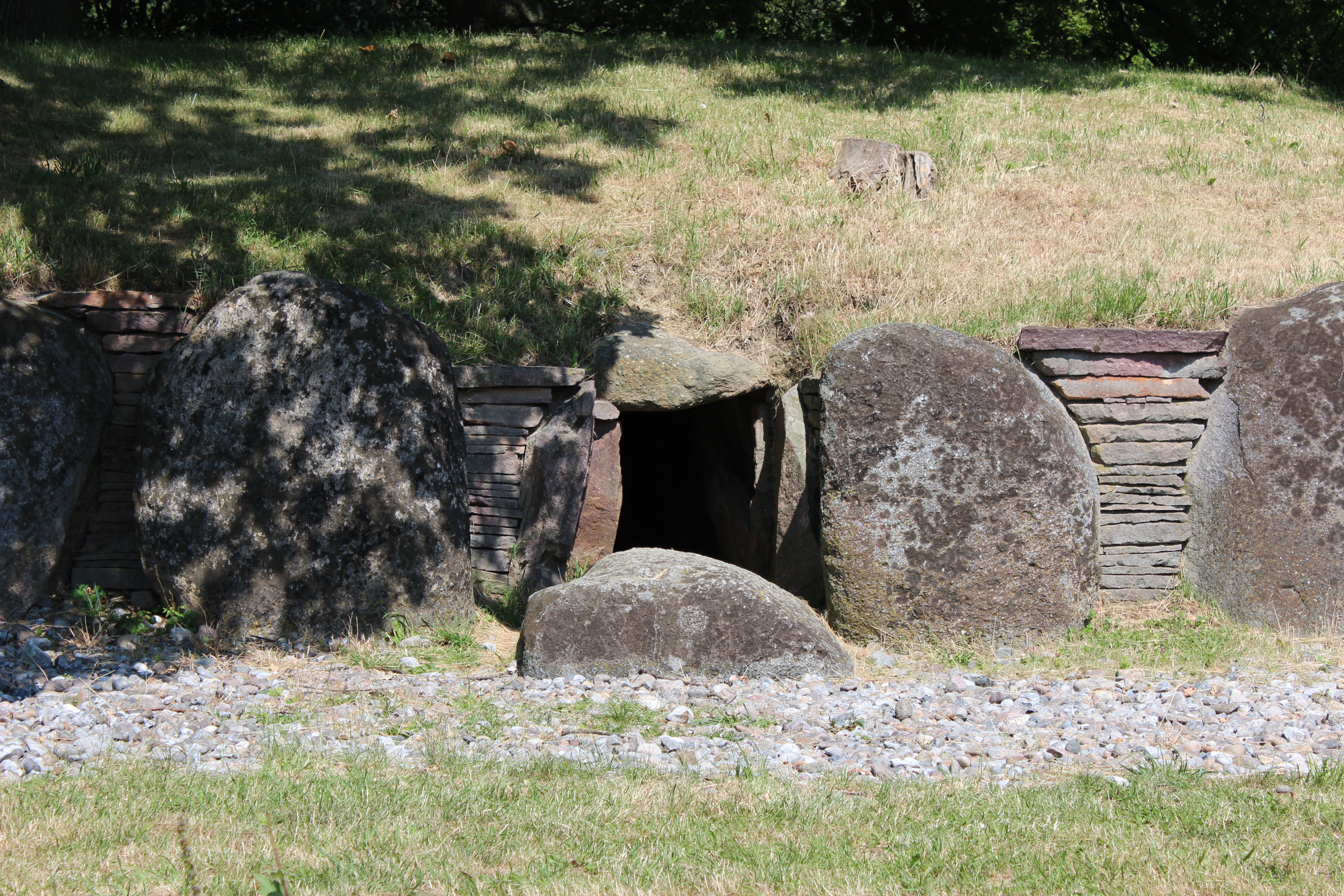
- The passage grave in 2014

- Location in Denmark
- 54.91181°N 11.26485°E
- Type: Passage grave
- Periods: Neolithic
- Location: Zealand, Denmark

History
- Built: c. 3200 BC

Site notes
- Height: 1.5 m (4 ft 11 in)

Kong Svends Høj (English: King Svend's Mound) is a passage grave on the island of Lolland in Denmark, immediately north of Pederstrup. The chamber in the mound is 12.5 metres (41 ft) long and it is one of Denmark's largest and most famous passage graves.

== Description ==
Kong Svends Høj consists of a large, rectangular mound covering a chamber 12.5 metres (41 ft) in length. The mound is surrounded by kerbstones, which, with a height of around 1.5 metres (4 ft 11 in), are among the tallest recorded in a Neolithic tomb. The gable stones are almost 4 metres (13 ft) high. The north-western façade originally had two outliers, known as "horns" or guard stones.

The first excavations were attempted in 1780 by a Danish prime minister and a pastor's son who later became bishop of Copenhagen. The tomb was first restored in 1942, when the entrance was discovered. The tomb is thought to date to the middle Neolithic period, around 3200 BC.
