= Conrad Laursen =

Danish racing driver (born 2006)

- Laursen at Silverstone Circuit in 2026
- Nationality: (Denmark) Danish
- Born: Conrad Nicholai Weis Laursen; 11 May 2006 (age 20) Copenhagen, Denmark
- Relatives: Johnny Laursen (father)

European Le Mans Series career
- Debut season: 2023
- Current team: AF Corse
- Categorisation: FIA Silver
- Car number: TBA
- Starts: 6 (6 entries)
- Wins: 0
- Podiums: 2
- Poles: 0
- Fastest laps: 0
- Best finish: 7th in 2023

Previous series
- 2022 2021-2022 2021-2022 2020: Formula 4 UAE Championship; Italian F4 Championship; ADAC Formula 4 F4 Danish Championship

Championship titles
- 2020: F4 Danish Championship

Awards
- 2025: Goodyear Golden Wingfoot Award

Conrad Nicholai Weis Laursen (born 11 May 2006) is a Danish racing driver driving in the European Le Mans Series and GT World Challenge Europe Endurance Cup with AF Corse. He is the 2020 Danish F4 champion and 2025 GT World Challenge Europe Endurance Cup champion in the Bronze Cup class. Laursen is the son of former sportscar racing competitor Johnny Laursen.

== Early career ==
=== 2020 ===
In 2020, Laursen made his single-seater debut, competing in the F4 Danish Championship with FSP Racing. He started the campaign off strongly, taking a triple of podiums, which included his maiden win in car racing, at Jyllandsringen. The same results followed at Padborg Park, where the Dane once again finished second, third and first in the races. Having taken a sole podium in the third event, Laursen was declared as champion following the cancellation of the season finale, scheduled to take place at Sturup Raceway.

=== 2021 ===
Laursen progressed to the Italian F4 Championship the following year, driving for Prema Powerteam. Starting his year by finishing fifth in the season opener at Le Castellet, Laursen struggled the following round in Misano, being forced to retire from two races. Consistent points would come at Vallelunga and Imola, before he went without a points finish at the Red Bull Ring. Having scored a pair of top-ten results as well as a fastest lap at Monza, Laursen finished ninth in the overall championship, whilst losing out narrowly on the rookie title to Nikita Bedrin owing to a spin in the final race.

=== 2022 ===
Having started 2022 by racing in two events of the F4 UAE Championship, where he scored a pair of podiums, Laursen returned to the Italian and ADAC F4 series for his main campaign, once again competing with Prema. His season in the former began slowly, with the first two rounds yielding a mere three points finishes, before he scored his first podium in the series, finishing second in Race 3 at Spa. Another podium would follow at the Red Bull Ring, however that round would see Laursen's final points finish of the campaign, which meant that he classified 11th in the standings. In the German championship, Laursen scored a podium during the opening round, having come back from a 19th-placed grid slot during race 3, before struggling to achieve major results at the Hockenheimring, notably dropping to ninth from reverse-grid pole in the final race. Laursen bounced back at Zandvoort, where, having taken third place in race 1, he held off teammate Andrea Kimi Antonelli to take his first victory in the championship on Sunday by less than a tenth of a second. Despite leaving the series after round four, where he made another appearance on the rostrum, Laursen ended up sixth in the drivers' standings.

== Sportscar career ==
=== 2022: First appearance ===
Laursen made his first appearance in the world of GT racing in the Ferrari Challenge Europe, scoring a pair of top-five finishes at the Hockenheimring in 2022.

=== 2023: Debut in ELMS ===
For the 2023 season, Laursen switched to sportscar racing on a full-time basis, teaming up with his father Johnny and fellow Dane Nicklas Nielsen in the Asian Le Mans Series at the start of the year, before racing with the same teammates in the European Le Mans Series during the summer, driving for AF Corse-run Formula Racing in the GT category of both championships. Having scored two second places in the ELMS, the Laursens classified seventh in the standings.

=== 2024: First ELMS win ===
Laursen remained with Formula Racing in the ELMS, once again joining father Johnny and Nielsen at Formula Racing. During the opening round at Barcelona, Laursen and his teammates profited from an issue for the dominant Iron Dames entry to inherit the win and take the team's first win in the series since 2015, as well as Laursen's first ever sportscar victory. After a pair of ninth places in Le Castellet and Imola, Laursen's father was involved in an incident with Grégoire Saucy at Spa which put the team out of the race. Third place at Mugello and fourth in Portimão — a race where the Laursens drove without Nielsen — allowed the Formula Racing crew to finish sixth in the points standings.

Laursen, together with his father and Jordan Taylor, made his debut at the 24 Hours of Le Mans in 2024 with Spirit of Race. The car ran inside the top-five before Laursen suffered a collision that put the team two laps behind the leaders. Laursen set the fastest lap of the race within the LMGT3 category and finished eighth. At the end of the year, Laursen also made his FIA World Endurance Championship debut at Bahrain, replacing Clemens Schmid at Akkodis ASP.

=== 2025: GTWC Bronze Cup title ===
After taking part in the 2025 24 Hours of Daytona with AF Corse, Laursen embarked on a double campaign: he partnered Ferrari factory driver Davide Rigon and bronze-ranked Charles-Henri Samani in the ELMS, whilst joining Dennis Marschall and Dustin Blattner in the Bronze Cup of the GT World Challenge Europe Endurance Cup. Despite only finishing ninth in the ELMS standings, Laursen received the Goodyear Golden Wingfoot Award for having the best stint averages across the season. Laursen came close to finishing on the podium at Le Castellet, where he spun whilst chasing eventual third-place finisher Riccardo Pera, and at Imola, where Laursen finished third on-track but was demoted to fourth with a Full-Course Yellow infringement penalty.

In the GTWC Endurance Cup, Laursen and his teammates took victory at the Paul Ricard season opener after Marschall held off Dan Harper's advances in the final hour. After an unsuccessful Monza race, the 24 Hours of Spa yielded a class victory for the team; they ran near the front throughout the event, with Laursen charging from third to first during a night stint. Thanks to a strong Q3 effort by Blattner, the trio took pole at the Nürburgring. However, Laursen was collected by the No. 99 Attempto Racing Audi in a four-car collision and retired from the race. Nevertheless, a third place in class at Barcelona was enough to confirm Laursen and his teammates as Bronze Cup champions.

== Karting record ==
=== Karting career summary ===
Season	Series	Team	Position
2015	Danish Championship — Cadet Mini		**1st**
2016	WSK Super Master Series — 60 Mini	Formula Racing	77th
2016	WSK Final Cup — 60 Mini	Baby Race Srl	NC
2017	WSK Champions Cup — 60 Mini	Ward Racing	27th
2017	South Garda Winter Cup — Mini ROK	Ward Racing	14th
2017	WSK Super Master Series — 60 Mini	Ward Racing	24th
2018	WSK Champions Cup — OKJ	Ricky Flynn Motorsport	NC
2018	South Garda Winter Cup — OKJ	Ricky Flynn Motorsport	45th
2018	WSK Super Master Series — OKJ	Ricky Flynn Motorsport	40th
2018	German Karting Championship — OKJ	Ricky Flynn Motorsport	14th
2018	WSK Open Cup — OKJ	Ricky Flynn Motorsport	8th
2018	CIK-FIA European Championship — OKJ	Ricky Flynn Motorsport	13th
2018	CIK-FIA World Championship — OKJ	Ricky Flynn Motorsport	46th
2018	WSK Final Cup — OKJ	Ricky Flynn Motorsport	17th
2019	South Garda Winter Cup — OKJ	Ricky Flynn Motorsport	**3rd**
2019	WSK Champions Cup — OKJ	Ricky Flynn Motorsport	12th
2019	WSK Super Master Series — OKJ	Ricky Flynn Motorsport	16th
2019	WSK Euro Series — OKJ	Ricky Flynn Motorsport	14th
2019	CIK-FIA European Championship — OKJ	Ricky Flynn Motorsport	26th
2019	CIK-FIA World Championship — OKJ	Ricky Flynn Motorsport	16th
2019	WSK Open Cup — OKJ	Ricky Flynn Motorsport	16th
2019	WSK Final Cup — OKJ	Ricky Flynn Motorsport	20th

=== Complete CIK-FIA Karting European Championship results ===
(key) (Races in bold indicate pole position) (Races in italics indicate fastest lap)

Year	Team	Class	1	2	3	4	5	6	7	8	DC	Points
2018	Ricky Flynn Motorsport	OKJ	SAR; QH; 3	SAR; R 5	PFI; QH; 50	PFI; R DNQ	AMP; QH; 26	AMP; R 33	LEM; QH; 31	LEM; R 24	13th	19
2019	Ricky Flynn Motorsport	OKJ	ANG; QH; 5	ANG; R 25	GEN; QH; 11	GEN; R 29	KRI; QH; 20	KRI; R 17	LEM; QH; 11	LEM; R 21	26th	6

== Racing record ==
=== Racing career summary ===
Season	Series	Team	Races	Wins	Poles	F/Laps	Podiums	Points	Position
2020	F4 Danish Championship	Team FSP	9	2	0	0	7	151	**1st**
2021	Italian F4 Championship	Prema Powerteam	20	0	0	1	0	60	9th
2021	ADAC Formula 4 Championship	Prema Powerteam	6	0	0	0	0	2	19th
2021	Formula 4 UAE Championship - Trophy Round	Abu Dhabi Racing by Prema	1	0	0	0	1	N/A	**2nd**
2022	Formula 4 UAE Championship	Abu Dhabi Racing by Prema	8	0	0	0	2	56	12th
2022	Italian F4 Championship	Prema Powerteam	20	0	0	1	2	81	11th
2022	ADAC Formula 4 Championship	Prema Powerteam	12	1	0	1	4	129	6th
2022	Ferrari Challenge Europe - Trofeo Pirelli (Pro)	Formula Racing	2	0	0	0	0	15	10th
2023	Asian Le Mans Series - GT	Formula Racing	3	0	0	0	0	4	17th
2023	European Le Mans Series - LMGTE	Formula Racing	6	0	0	0	2	42	7th
2024	European Le Mans Series - LMGT3	Formula Racing	6	1	0	0	2	56	6th
2024	24 Hours of Le Mans - LMGT3	Spirit of Race	1	0	0	1	0	N/A	8th
2024	FIA World Endurance Championship - LMGT3	Akkodis ASP Team	1	0	0	0	0	0	37th
2024-25	Asian Le Mans Series - GT	AF Corse	4	0	0	0	0	9	19th
2025	IMSA SportsCar Championship - GTD	AF Corse	1	0	0	0	0	251	68th
2025	European Le Mans Series - LMGT3	AF Corse	6	0	0	1	0	42	9th
2025	GT World Challenge Europe Endurance Cup	Kessel Racing	5	0	0	0	0	0	NC
2025	GT World Challenge Europe Endurance Cup - Bronze Cup	Kessel Racing	5	2	1	0	3	97	**1st**
2026	European Le Mans Series - LMGT3	AF Corse	6	0	0	0	0	30	14th
2026	GT World Challenge Europe Endurance Cup	Selected Car Racing	1	0	0	0	0	0	NC
2026	24 Hours of Le Mans - LMGT3	Kessel Racing	1	0	0	0	0	N/A	10th

^{*} Season still in progress.

=== Complete F4 Danish Championship results ===
(key) (Races in bold indicate pole position) (Races in italics indicate fastest lap)

Year	Team	1	2	3	4	5	6	7	8	9	DC	Points
2020	Team FSP	JYL; 1; 2	JYL; 2; 3	JYL; 3; 1	PAD; 1; 2	PAD; 2; 3	PAD; 3; 1	DJU; 1; 6	DJU; 2; 3	DJU; 3; 4	1st	151

=== Complete Italian F4 Championship results ===
(key) (Races in bold indicate pole position) (Races in italics indicate fastest lap)

Year	Team	1	2	3	4	5	6	7	8	9	10	11	12	13	14	15	16	17	18	19	20	21	22	DC	Points
2021	Prema Powerteam	LEC; 1; 5	LEC; 2 Ret	LEC; 3 WD	MIS; 1; 18	MIS; 2 Ret	MIS; 3 Ret	VLL; 1; 8	VLL; 2; 5	VLL; 3; 6	IMO; 1; 5	IMO; 2; 7	IMO; 3 Ret	RBR; 1; 13	RBR; 2; 13	RBR; 3; 11	MUG; 1; 9	MUG; 2; 13	MUG; 3; 11	MNZ; 1; 7	MNZ; 2; 8	MNZ; 3; 25		9th	60
2022	Prema Racing	IMO; 1 Ret	IMO; 2; 29	IMO; 3; 13	MIS; 1; 6	MIS; 2; 6	MIS; 3; 5	SPA; 1; 8	SPA; 2 Ret	SPA; 3; 2	VLL; 1; 8	VLL; 2; 8	VLL; 3; 11	RBR; 1	RBR; 2; 9	RBR; 3; 3	RBR; 4; 6	MNZ; 1; 32†	MNZ; 2; 24	MNZ; 3 C	MUG; 1 Ret	MUG; 2; 22	MUG; 3 Ret	11th	81

=== Complete ADAC Formula 4 Championship results ===
(key) (Races in bold indicate pole position) (Races in italics indicate fastest lap)

Year	Team	1	2	3	4	5	6	7	8	9	10	11	12	13	14	15	16	17	18	Pos	Points
2021	Prema Powerteam	RBR; 1; 15	RBR; 2; 17	RBR; 3 Ret	ZAN; 1; 15	ZAN; 2; 15	ZAN; 3; 10	NÜR; 1	NÜR; 2	NÜR; 3	HOC1; 1	HOC1; 2	HOC1; 3	SAC; 1	SAC; 2	SAC; 3	HOC2; 1	HOC2; 2	HOC2; 3	19th	2
2022	Prema Racing	SPA; 1; 4	SPA; 2 Ret	SPA; 3; 3	HOC; 1; 7	HOC; 2; 8	HOC; 3; 9	ZAN; 1; 3	ZAN; 2; 7	ZAN; 3; 1	NÜR1; 1; 5	NÜR1; 2; 6	NÜR1; 3; 2	LAU; 1	LAU; 2	LAU; 3	NÜR2; 1	NÜR2; 2	NÜR2; 3	6th	129

=== Complete Asian Le Mans Series results ===
(key) (Races in bold indicate pole position) (Races in italics indicate fastest lap)

Year	Team	Class	Car	Engine	1	2	3	4	5	6	Pos.	Points
2023	Formula Racing	GT	Ferrari 488 GT3 Evo 2020	Ferrari F154CB 3.9 L Turbo V8	DUB; 1; 8	DUB; 2 Ret	ABU; 1 Ret	ABU; 2 WD			17th	4
2024-25	AF Corse	GT	Ferrari 296 GT3	Ferrari F163CE 3.0 L Turbo V6	SEP; 1; 20	SEP; 2; 10	DUB; 1 WD	DUB; 2 WD	ABU; 1; 6	ABU; 2 Ret	19th	9

=== Complete European Le Mans Series results ===
(key) (Races in bold indicate pole position; results in italics indicate fastest lap)

Year	Entrant	Class	Chassis	Engine	1	2	3	4	5	6	Rank	Points
2023	Formula Racing	LMGTE	Ferrari 488 GTE Evo	Ferrari F154CB 3.9 L Turbo V8	CAT; 2	LEC; 8	ARA; Ret	SPA; 2	PRT; 12	ALG; 9	7th	42
2024	Formula Racing	LMGT3	Ferrari 296 GT3	Ferrari F163CE 3.0 L Turbo V6	CAT; 1	LEC; 9	IMO; 9	SPA; Ret	MUG; 3	ALG; 4	6th	56
2025	AF Corse	LMGT3	Ferrari 296 GT3	Ferrari F163CE 3.0 L Turbo V6	CAT; 5	LEC; 5	IMO; 4	SPA; 6	MUG; 11	ALG; 9	9th	42
2026	AF Corse	LMGT3	Ferrari 296 GT3 Evo	Ferrari F163CE 3.0 L Turbo V6	CAT; 9	LEC; DSQ	IMO; 6	SPA; 4	SIL; Ret	ALG; 6	14th	30

^{*} Season still in progress.

=== Complete FIA World Endurance Championship results ===
(key) (Races in bold indicate pole position) (Races in italics indicate fastest lap)

Year	Entrant	Class	Car	Engine	1	2	3	4	5	6	7	8	Rank	Points
2024	Akkodis ASP Team	LMGT3	Lexus RC F GT3	Lexus 2UR-GSE 5.0 L V8	QAT	IMO	SPA	LMS	SÃO	COA	FUJ	BHR; Ret	37th	0

=== 24 Hours of Le Mans results ===
Year	Team	Co-Drivers	Car	Class	Laps	Pos.	Class Pos.
2024	(Italy) Sprit of Race	(Denmark) Johnny Laursen (United States) Jordan Taylor	Ferrari 296 GT3	LMGT3	279	35th	8th
2026	(Switzerland) Kessel Racing	(Japan) Takeshi Kimura (Brazil) Daniel Serra	Ferrari 296 GT3 Evo	LMGT3	334	42nd	10th

=== Complete IMSA SportsCar Championship results ===
(key) (Races in bold indicate pole position; races in italics indicate fastest lap)

Year	Entrant	Class	Chassis	Engine	1	2	3	4	5	6	7	8	9	10	Rank	Points
2025	AF Corse	GTD	Ferrari 296 GT3	Ferrari F163CE 3.0 L Turbo V6	DAY; 7	SEB	LBH	LGA	WGL	MOS	ELK	VIR	IMS	PET	68th	251

=== Complete GT World Challenge Europe results ===
==== GT World Challenge Europe Endurance Cup ====
(key) (Races in bold indicate pole position; races in italics indicate fastest lap)

Year	Team	Car	Class	1	2	3	4	5	6	7	Pos.	Points
2025	Kessel Racing	Ferrari 296 GT3	Bronze	LEC; 26	MNZ; 29	SPA; 6H; 10	SPA; 12H; 16	SPA; 24H; 15	**NÜR**; Ret	CAT; 18	1st	97
2026	Selected Car Racing	Ferrari 296 GT3 Evo	Gold	LEC	MNZ	SPA; 6H; 16	SPA; 12H; 42	SPA; 24H; 26	NÜR	ALG	16th	23

^{*}Season still in progress.
