= 2017 F4 Danish Championship =

Motor racing competition

The 2017 F4 Danish Championship season was the first season of the F4 Danish Championship. The season began at Jyllandsringen in April and concluded at the same circuit in October.

== Teams and drivers ==
All teams were Danish-registered.

Team	No.	Drivers	Rounds
Formula 4 entries
Lundgaard Racing	1	(Denmark) Daniel Lundgaard	All
Lundgaard Racing	20	(Denmark) Christian Lundgaard	2
Lundgaard Racing	20	(Norway) Lars Solheim	4
Magnussen Racing Experience	2	(Denmark) Christian Rasmussen	All
Magnussen Racing Experience	6	(Denmark) Noah Watt	1–6
Magnussen Racing Experience	6	(Italy) Matteo Ferrer	7
FSP	5	(Denmark) Casper Pilgaard	All
Vesti Motorsport	7	(Denmark) Frederik Vesti	1, 3–5, 7
Vesti Motorsport	8	(Denmark) Mikkel Cahnbley Henriksen	All
Vesti Motorsport	9	(Denmark) Nicolas Beer	2, 5, 7
Vesti Motorsport	9	(Singapore) Danial Frost	4
Vesti Motorsport	9	(Belgium) Benjamin Bailly	6
M-Racing	15	(Denmark) Mikkel Sjødahl Dam	1–5
Profil Racing	18	(Denmark) Jacob Emil Lassen	1–2, 4, 6
Formula 5 entries
FSP	41	(Denmark) Aske Nygaard Bramming	All
FSP	44	(Denmark) Casper Tobias Hansen	All
FSP	67	(Denmark) Jonas Lindhard Nielsen	All
Mads Hoe Motorsport	47	(Denmark) Mads Hoe	6–7
GO BIG Promotion	48	(Denmark) Martin Harritz Nielsen	All
Rytteriet	49	(Denmark) Niels Ejnar Rytter	1–2, 4, 6
Sønderskov Motorsport	59	(Denmark) Line Sønderskov Abildgaard	All
CF Racing	69	(Denmark) Alexander Müller	1–2, 4, 6–7
CF Racing	120	(Denmark) Marcus Mose	1, 7
CK Motorsport	83	(Denmark) Dennis Dybro Christensen	1–2
CK Motorsport	84	(Denmark) Emil Baand Kristensen	1–2, 4–7
Magnussen Racing Experience	85	(Denmark) Valdemar Eriksen	1, 3–5
SRT-Motorsport	94	(Denmark) Jesper Nyvang Pedersen	1–2

== Calendar and results ==
All rounds were held in Denmark.

Rnd.		Circuit/Location	Date	Supporting
1	R1	Jyllandsringen, Silkeborg	22 April	Danish Thundersport Championship
1	R2	Jyllandsringen, Silkeborg	23 April	Danish Thundersport Championship
1	R3	Jyllandsringen, Silkeborg	23 April	Danish Thundersport Championship
2	R1	Ring Djursland, Pederstrup	10 June	Danish Thundersport Championship
2	R2	Ring Djursland, Pederstrup	11 June	Danish Thundersport Championship
2	R3	Ring Djursland, Pederstrup	11 June	Danish Thundersport Championship
3	R1	Padborg Park, Padborg	24 June	Danish Endurance Championship
3	R2	Padborg Park, Padborg	25 June	Danish Endurance Championship
3	R3	Padborg Park, Padborg	25 June	Danish Endurance Championship
4	R1	Jyllandsringen, Silkeborg	19 August	Danish Thundersport Championship
4	R2	Jyllandsringen, Silkeborg	19 August	Danish Thundersport Championship
4	R3	Jyllandsringen, Silkeborg	20 August	Danish Thundersport Championship
5	R1	Padborg Park, Padborg	2 September	Danish Supertourisme Turbo
5	R2	Padborg Park, Padborg	2 September	Danish Supertourisme Turbo
5	R3	Padborg Park, Padborg	2 September	Danish Supertourisme Turbo
6	R1	Ring Djursland, Pederstrup	16 September	Danish Supertourisme Turbo
6	R2	Ring Djursland, Pederstrup	17 September	Danish Supertourisme Turbo
6	R3	Ring Djursland, Pederstrup	17 September	Danish Supertourisme Turbo
7	R1	Jyllandsringen, Silkeborg	30 September	Danish Thundersport Championship
7	R2	Jyllandsringen, Silkeborg	1 October	Danish Thundersport Championship
7	R3	Jyllandsringen, Silkeborg	1 October	Danish Thundersport Championship

== Results ==
Rnd.		Circuit	Pole position	Fastest lap	Winning driver	Winning team	Winning F5
1	R1	Jyllandsringen	(Denmark) Frederik Vesti	(Denmark) Frederik Vesti	(Denmark) Frederik Vesti	Vesti Motorsport	(Denmark) Casper Tobias Hansen
1	R2	Jyllandsringen		(Denmark) Daniel Lundgaard	(Denmark) Frederik Vesti	Vesti Motorsport	(Denmark) Casper Tobias Hansen
1	R3	Jyllandsringen	(Denmark) Frederik Vesti	(Denmark) Frederik Vesti	(Denmark) Frederik Vesti	Vesti Motorsport	(Denmark) Casper Tobias Hansen
2	R1	Ring Djursland	(Denmark) Daniel Lundgaard	(Denmark) Christian Rasmussen	(Denmark) Daniel Lundgaard	Lundgaard Racing	(Denmark) Casper Tobias Hansen
2	R2	Ring Djursland		(Denmark) Christian Lundgaard	(Denmark) Daniel Lundgaard	Lundgaard Racing	(Denmark) Casper Tobias Hansen
2	R3	Ring Djursland	(Denmark) Daniel Lundgaard	(Denmark) Christian Lundgaard	(Denmark) Daniel Lundgaard	Lundgaard Racing	(Denmark) Casper Tobias Hansen
3	R1	Padborg Park	(Denmark) Frederik Vesti (Note: Casper Tobias Hansen, driving a F5 car, scored the fastest and 2nd fastest laps in qualifying.)	(Denmark) Daniel Lundgaard (Note: Casper Tobias Hansen, driving a F5 car, scored the fastest lap in the race.)	(Denmark) Daniel Lundgaard	Lundgaard Racing	(Denmark) Casper Tobias Hansen
3	R2	Padborg Park		(Denmark) Daniel Lundgaard	(Denmark) Daniel Lundgaard	Lundgaard Racing	(Denmark) Casper Tobias Hansen
3	R3	Padborg Park	(Denmark) Frederik Vesti	(Denmark) Daniel Lundgaard	(Denmark) Frederik Vesti	Vesti Motorsport	(Denmark) Casper Tobias Hansen
4	R1	Jyllandsringen	(Denmark) Daniel Lundgaard	(Denmark) Frederik Vesti	(Denmark) Daniel Lundgaard	Lundgaard Racing	(Denmark) Aske Nygaard Bramming
4	R2	Jyllandsringen		(Denmark) Daniel Lundgaard	(Denmark) Frederik Vesti	Vesti Motorsport	(Denmark) Aske Nygaard Bramming
4	R3	Jyllandsringen	(Denmark) Daniel Lundgaard	(Denmark) Christian Rasmussen	(Denmark) Christian Rasmussen	Magnussen Racing Experience	(Denmark) Aske Nygaard Bramming
5	R1	Padborg Park	(Denmark) Daniel Lundgaard	(Denmark) Nicolas Beer	(Denmark) Nicolas Beer	Vesti Motorsport	(Denmark) Casper Tobias Hansen
5	R2	Padborg Park		(Denmark) Frederik Vesti (Note: Aske Nygaard Bramming, driving a F5 car, scored the fastest lap in the race.)	(Denmark) Nicolas Beer	Vesti Motorsport	(Denmark) Jonas Lindhard Nielsen
5	R3	Padborg Park	(Denmark) Daniel Lundgaard	(Denmark) Daniel Lundgaard	(Denmark) Frederik Vesti	Vesti Motorsport	(Denmark) Aske Nygaard Bramming
6	R1	Ring Djursland	(Denmark) Daniel Lundgaard (Note: Casper Tobias Hansen, driving a F5 car, scored the fastest lap in qualifying.)	(Denmark) Mikkel Cahnbley Henriksen	(Denmark) Casper Pilgaard	FSP	(Denmark) Casper Tobias Hansen
6	R2	Ring Djursland		(Belgium) Benjamin Bailly	(Denmark) Mikkel Cahnbley Henriksen	Vesti Motorsport	(Denmark) Casper Tobias Hansen
6	R3	Ring Djursland	(Denmark) Daniel Lundgaard (Note: Aske Nygaard Bramming, driving a F5 car, scored the 2nd fastest lap in qualifying.)	(Belgium) Benjamin Bailly	(Denmark) Daniel Lundgaard	Lundgaard Racing	(Denmark) Aske Nygaard Bramming
7	R1	Jyllandsringen	(Denmark) Frederik Vesti	(Denmark) Christian Rasmussen	(Denmark) Frederik Vesti	Vesti Motorsport	(Denmark) Aske Nygaard Bramming
7	R2	Jyllandsringen		(Denmark) Daniel Lundgaard	(Denmark) Frederik Vesti	Vesti Motorsport	(Denmark) Aske Nygaard Bramming
7	R3	Jyllandsringen	(Denmark) Christian Rasmussen	(Denmark) Nicolas Beer	(Denmark) Christian Rasmussen	Magnussen Racing Experience	(Denmark) Aske Nygaard Bramming

== Championship standings ==
Points were awarded to the top 10 classified finishers in each race. No points were awarded for pole position or fastest lap.

Position	**1st**	**2nd**	**3rd**	**4th**	**5th**	**6th**	**7th**	**8th**	**9th**	**10th**
Points	25	18	15	12	10	8	6	4	2	1

=== Drivers' standings ===
Pos	Driver	JYL1			DJU1			PAD1			JYL2			PAD2			DJU2			JYL3			Pts
**Formula 4**
1	(Denmark) Daniel Lundgaard	2	2	2	**1**	**1**	**1**	1	**1**	2	**1**	**2**	**8**	**2**	5	**3**	**14†**	4	**1**	6	2	Ret	368
2	(Denmark) Frederik Vesti	**1**	**1**	**1**				**2**	2	**1**	2	1	2	3	6	1				**1**	1	2	320
3	(Denmark) Christian Rasmussen	5	4	3	3	2	Ret	3	9	7	3	3	1	4	7	4	4	5	3	2	3	**1**	292
4	(Denmark) Mikkel Cahnbley Henriksen	6	5	5	6	9	5	4	3	6	Ret	7	3	5	9	7	3	1	5	4	4	5	229
5	(Denmark) Casper Pilgaard	3	3	7	Ret	8	6	5	7	8	14	4	Ret	7	Ret	5	1	**2**	6	5	5	3	204
6	(Denmark) Noah Watt	4	6	4	5	3	Ret	6	4	4	16†	6	Ret	6	8	6	6	12	4				160
7	(Denmark) Nicolas Beer				2	15†	3							1	**1**	2				3	DSQ	Ret	120
8	(Denmark) Mikkel Sjødahl Dam	8	7	10	11	11	Ret	7	11	Ret	4	8	4	DNS	DNS	DNS							70
9	(Denmark) Jacob Emil Lassen	10	10	13	15	Ret	DNS				8	11	12				12	15	DNS				45
10	(Belgium) Benjamin Bailly																8	3	2				43
11	(Denmark) Christian Lundgaard				4	4	2																42
12	(Norway) Lars Solheim										7	9	7										22
13	(Italy) Matteo Ferrer																			Ret	11	8	18
14	(Singapore) Danial Frost										13	5	Ret										16
**Formula 5**
1	(Denmark) Aske Nygaard Bramming	Ret	11	9	8	6	9	9	6	5	5	**10**	5	10	4	8	5	7	**7**	7	**6**	4	398
2	(Denmark) Casper Tobias Hansen	**7**	**8**	**6**	**7**	**5**	**4**	**8**	**5**	**3**	**Ret**	DNS	**Ret**	**8**	**3**	**11**	**2**	**6**	DNS	**8**	7	**Ret**	366
3	(Denmark) Jonas Lindhard Nielsen	9	9	8	12	7	12†	11	8	9	6	12	6	9	2	9	7	16	8	9	8	6	325
4	(Denmark) Martin Harritz Nielsen	11	20	14	9	Ret	7	10	10	10	11	14	Ret	12	10	DNS	9	9	10	11	10	9	207
5	(Denmark) Alexander Müller	15	13	15	14	10	10†				9	13	9				10	10	9	10	9	7	169
6	(Denmark) Line Sønderskov Abildgaard	17	19	19	16	13	8	13	13	12	12	16†	13†	Ret	12	12	13	13	13	NC	Ret	11	119
7	(Denmark) Valdemar Eriksen	16	18	18				12	12	11	15	DSQ	11	11	11	10							87
8	(Denmark) Emil Baand Kristensen	Ret	16	Ret	Ret	14	DNS				10	15	10	Ret	DNS	DNS	DNS	14	12	DNS	13	Ret	64
9	(Denmark) Niels Ejnar Rytter	14	14	17	10	Ret	11†				DSQ	DNS	DNS				11	11	11				64
10	(Denmark) Marcus Mose	13	15	12																12	14	12	44
11	(Denmark) Dennis Dybro Christensen	12	12	16	Ret	10	DNS																38
12	(Denmark) Mads Hoe																DNS	8	14†	Ret	12	12†	33
13	(Denmark) Jesper Nyvang Pedersen	DNS	17	11	13	Ret	DNS																22
Pos	Driver	JYL1			DJU1			PAD1			JYL2			PAD2			DJU2			JYL3			Pts

Colour	Result
Gold	Winner
Silver	Second place
Bronze	Third place
Green	Points classification
Blue	Non-points classification
Blue	Non-classified finish (NC)
Purple	Retired, not classified (Ret)
Red	Did not qualify (DNQ)
Red	Did not pre-qualify (DNPQ)
Black	Disqualified (DSQ)
White	Did not start (DNS)
White	Withdrew (WD)
White	Race cancelled (C)
Blank	Did not practice (DNP)
Blank	Did not arrive (DNA)
Blank	Excluded (EX)

**Bold** – Pole
Italics – Fastest Lap

Notes:

- † – Drivers did not finish the race, but were classified as they completed over 75% of the race distance.

=== Teams' championship ===
Pos	Team	Points
**Formula 4**
1	Vesti Motorsport	686
2	Magnussen Racing Experience	470
3	Lundgaard Racing	410
4	FSP	204
5	M-Racing	70
6	Profil Racing	45
**Formula 5**
1	FSP	1089
2	CF Racing	213
3	GO BIG Promotion	207
4	Sønderskov Motorsport	119
5	CK Motorsport	102
6	Magnussen Racing Experience	87
7	Rytteriet	64
8	Mads Hoe Motorsport	33
9	SRT-Motorsport	22
