= Kinnekulle Ring =

Motor racing circuit in Kinnekulle, Sweden

- Location: Kinnekulle, Västra Götaland County, Sweden
- Coordinates: 58°32′46″N 13°23′56″E
- Opened: 10 August 1969; 56 years ago
- Major events: Current: Nordic 4 (2019, 2026); Former: NTCC (2002); STCC (1996–1997); European F3 (1979); European F2 (1973); European RX; Euro RX of Sweden (1983, 1992, 1996)

Full Circuit (1969–present)
- Length: 2.072 km (1.287 mi)
- Turns: 8
- Race lap record: 0:47.410 ( (Sweden) Niclas Jönsson, Reynard 903, 1990, F3)

Kinnekulle Ring is a 2.072 km (1.287 mi) motor racing circuit in Kinnekulle, Sweden. The circuit was built in 1969. The circuit is mainly used for the national events, however it also hosted some international events, such as European Formula Two Championship, European Rallycross Championship, Norwegian Touring Car Championship, and lastly F4 Danish Championship.

== Lap records ==
As of July 2019, the fastest official race lap records at the Kinnekulle Ring are listed as:

| Category | Time | Driver | Vehicle | Event |
Full Circuit (1969–present): 2.072 km (1.287 mi)
| Formula 3 | 0:47.410 | Niclas Jönsson | Reynard 903 | 1990 Kinnekulle Swedish F3 round |
| Formula 2 | 0:49.500 | Jochen Mass | Surtees TS15 | 1973 Kinnekulle European F2 round |
| Formula 4 | 0:51.280 | Jonas Lindhard Nielsen | Mygale M14-F4 | 2019 Kinnekulle Danish F4 round |
| Formula Ford | 0:51.834 | Mads Hoe | Mygale SJ03 | 2019 Kinnekulle Danish F4 round |
| Super Touring | 0:53.103 | Jarle Gåsland | Volvo S40 | 2002 Kinnekulle NTCC round |
