= Nordic 4 Championship =

Automobile racing series

Nordic 4
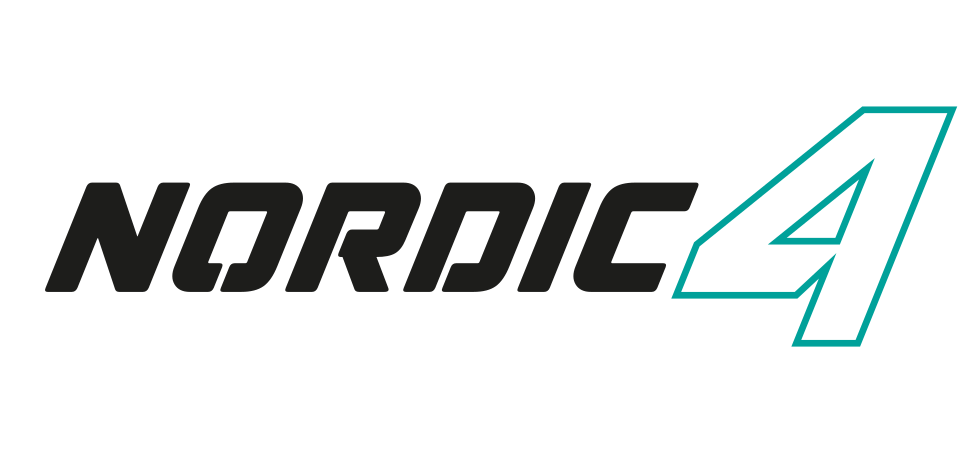
- Category: Formula 4
- Country: Denmark
- Inaugural season: 2017
- Constructors: Mygale
- Engine suppliers: Renault
- Tyre suppliers: Pirelli
- Drivers' champion: (Denmark) Mathias Bjerre Jakobsen
- Teams' champion: (Denmark) STEP Motorsport
- Official website: Official website

Nordic 4, formerly known as F4 Danish Championship is a Danish motor racing series for open-wheel cars complying with FIA Formula 4 Gen1 regulations. The inaugural championship was contested in 2017.

== History ==
In September 2016, the Dansk Automobil Sports Union (DASU) announced that it would introduce the FIA Formula 4 category in Denmark. This was followed on 6 November 2016 by the official launch of the F4 Danish Championship. Danish F4 cars were to use the French Mygale chassis and the 2.0-litre Renault engine. The series will comprise seven rounds, supporting the Danish Thundersport Championship, Danish Endurance Championship and Danish Supertourisme Turbo at their events.

F4 cars will share the track with the F5 cars (previously called Formula Ford), but will receive separate classifications. From 2019 F5 cars are classified with-in the F4 results, as well as a separate cup.

In late 2023, the championship announced a new name for 2024.

== Car ==
The championship features Mygale designed and built cars constructed of carbon fibre and featuring a monocoque chassis. Power is provided by a 2.0-litre Renault engine.

From 2026, Danish manufacturer Aquila Racing Cars introduced the Aquila Formula Nova to the series. The car has a tubular chassis, ground-effect aerodynamics and a HALO device. It is powered by a Yamaha MT-09 engine. The Mygale F4 and F5 cars continued to be used alongside.

== Champions ==
=== Drivers ===
Season	Driver	Team	Races	Poles	Wins	Podiums	Fastest lap	Points	Margins
F4 Danish Championship
2017	(Denmark) Daniel Lundgaard	(Denmark) Lundgaard Racing	21	8	7	16	7	368	48
2018	(Denmark) Casper Tobias Hansen	(Denmark) FSP	24	5	13	19	13	461	119
2019	(Denmark) Malthe Jakobsen	(Denmark) FSP	24	6	11	18	6	428	78
2020	(Denmark) Conrad Laursen	(Denmark) FSP	9	0	2	7	0	151	18
2021	(Denmark) Mads Hoe	(Denmark) Mads Hoe Motorsport	18	2	4	14	2	299	56
2022	(Denmark) Julius Dinesen	(Denmark) STEP Motorsport	18	2	4	12	4	278	5
2023	(Denmark) Mikkel Gaarde Pedersen	(Denmark) BAR	18	2	6	11	6	279	4
Nordic 4 Championship
2024	(Denmark) Mathias Bjerre Jakobsen	(Denmark) STEP Motorsport	21	4	12	17	10	399	78

Season	Championship	Driver	Team	Races	Poles	Wins	Podiums	Fastest lap	Points	Margins
2025	Danish	(Denmark) Marius Kristiansen	(Denmark) FSP	18	2	5	13	9	288	24
2025	Nordic	(Denmark) Sebastian Bach	(Denmark) STEP Motorsport	18	3	5	12	5	279	1

=== Teams ===
Season	Team	Drivers	Poles	Wins	Podiums	Fastest lap	Points	Margins
2017	(Denmark) Vesti Motorsport	5	5	11	27	8	686	216
2018	(Denmark) FSP	3	6	15	33	16	701	359
2019	(Denmark) FSP	3	6	13	26	8	679	329
2020	(Denmark) FSP	3	0	7	16	7	405	320
2021	(Denmark) Mads Hoe Motorsport	3	4	4	19	3	404	318
2022	(Denmark) STEP Motorsport	3	3	4	18	7	477	42
2023	(Denmark) STEP Motorsport	3	0	0	17	2	344	65
2024	(Denmark) STEP Motorsport	5	5	14	29	12	712	312

Season	Championship	Team	Drivers	Poles	Wins	Podiums	Fastest lap	Points	Margins
2025	Danish	(Denmark) STEP Motorsport	5	2	4	20	4	537	92
2025	Nordic	(Denmark) STEP Motorsport	5	3	7	26	7	589	159

=== Rookie ===
Season	Driver	Team
2018	(Denmark) Malthe Jakobsen	(Denmark) FSP
2019	(Denmark) Largim Ali	(Denmark) FSP
2020	(Denmark) Conrad Laursen	(Denmark) FSP
2021	(Denmark) Noah Strømsted	(Denmark) FSP
2022	(Denmark) Julius Dinesen	(Denmark) STEP Motorsport
2023	(Denmark) Mikkel Gaarde Pedersen	(Denmark) BAR
2024	(Denmark) Sebastian Bach	(Denmark) STEP Motorsport

Season	Championship	Driver	Team
2025	Danish	(Denmark) Casper Nissen	(Denmark) STEP Motorsport
2025	Nordic	(Denmark) Viktor Snebjørn Poulsen	(Denmark) STEP Motorsport

=== Formula 5 champions ===
Season	Driver	Team	Races	Poles	Wins	Podiums	Fastest lap	Points	Margins
2017	(Denmark) Aske Nygaard Bramming	(Denmark) FSP	21	3	8	19	8	368	48
2018	(Denmark) Mads Hoe	(Denmark) Mads Hoe Motorsport	24	4	13	19	15	477	39
2019	(Denmark) Lucas Daugaard	(Denmark) Daugaard Racing	24	7	22	24	23	203	124
2020	(Denmark) Mads Hoe	(Denmark) Mads Hoe Motorsport	9	2	6	7	8	165	20
2021	(Denmark) Mads Hoe	(Denmark) Mads Hoe Motorsport	18	1	15	14	2	299	56
2022	(Denmark) Mille Hoe	(Denmark) Mads Hoe Motorsport	18	0	8	17	0	363	163
2023	(Germany) Oliver Kratsch	(Denmark) Mads Hoe Motorsport	18	0	7	15	6	316	12
2024	(Denmark) Mads Hoe	(Denmark) Mads Hoe Motorsport	21	7	19	19	19	475	155

Season	Championship	Driver	Team	Races	Poles	Wins	Podiums	Fastest lap	Points	Margins
2025	Danish	(Denmark) Mads Hoe	(Denmark) Mads Hoe Motorsport	18		13	13		327	28
2025	Nordic	(Denmark) Anton Morsing	(Denmark) Mads Hoe Motorsport	18		4	13		303	1

== Circuits ==
- **Bold** denotes a circuit will be used in the 2026 season.

Number	Circuits	Rounds	Years
1	(Denmark) **Jyllandsringen**	19 (Note: Jyllandsringen hosted 3 rounds in 2017–2019, 2 rounds in 2021–2022 and 2024—2025, and it will host 2 rounds in 2026.)	2017–present
2	(Denmark) **Padborg Park**	18 (Note: Padborg Park hosted 3 rounds in 2021, 2 rounds in 2017–2019, 2022—2025, and it will host 2 rounds in 2026.)	2017–present
3	(Denmark) Ring Djursland	12 (Note: Ring Djursland hosted 2 rounds in 2017–2019.)	2017–2025
4	(Sweden) **Karlskoga Motorstadion**	3	2023–present
5	(Sweden) Anderstorp Raceway	2	2023, 2025
5	(Sweden) Falkenbergs Motorbana	2	2024–2025
7	(Norway) **Rudskogen Motorsenter**	1	2018, 2026
7	(Sweden) **Kinnekulle Ring**	1	2019, 2026
7	(Sweden) **Sturup Raceway**	1	2022, 2026
