= Pederstrup =

Manor house in Denmark

Coordinates: 54°53′48″N 11°16′04″E

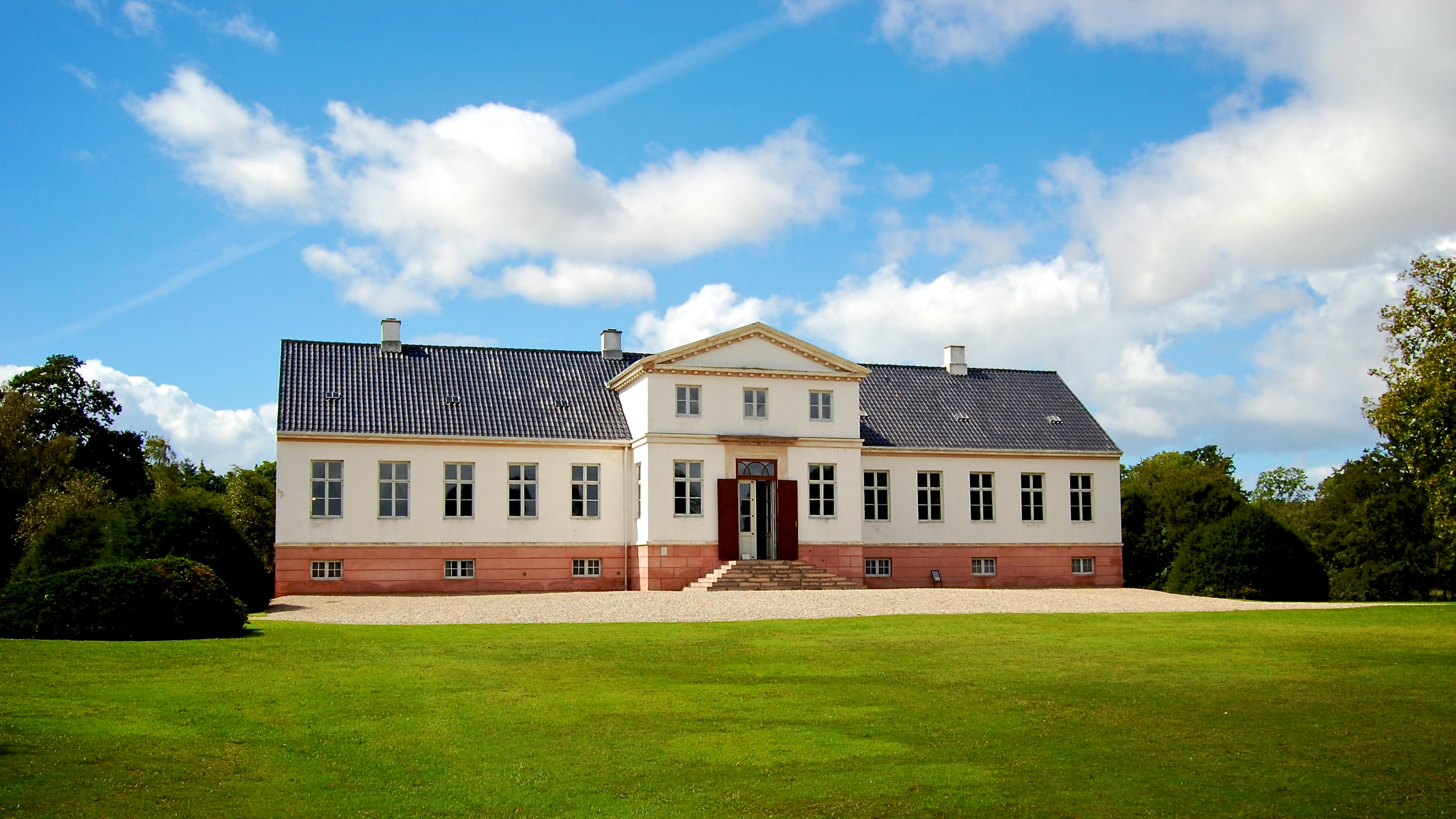
Pederstrup

Pederstrup is a historic manor house located 12 km (7.5 mi) north of Nakskov on the Danish island of Lolland. The half-timbered building from 1686 was rebuilt from 1813 to 1822 in the Neoclassical style by the statesman Christian Ditlev Frederik Reventlow. Since 1940, it has housed the Reventlow Museum.

== History ==
Pederstrup was first mentioned in the 1340s when the estate belonged to Rigsdrost Laurits Jonsen. A vaulted cellar from the mid-16th century is the oldest remaining part of the building which then served as the residence of the king's vassal. In 1576, King Frederick II sold the property to the Venstermand family. In 1684, the half-timbered building was purchased by the statesman Peder von Brandt who added two symmetrical wings in the Baroque style.

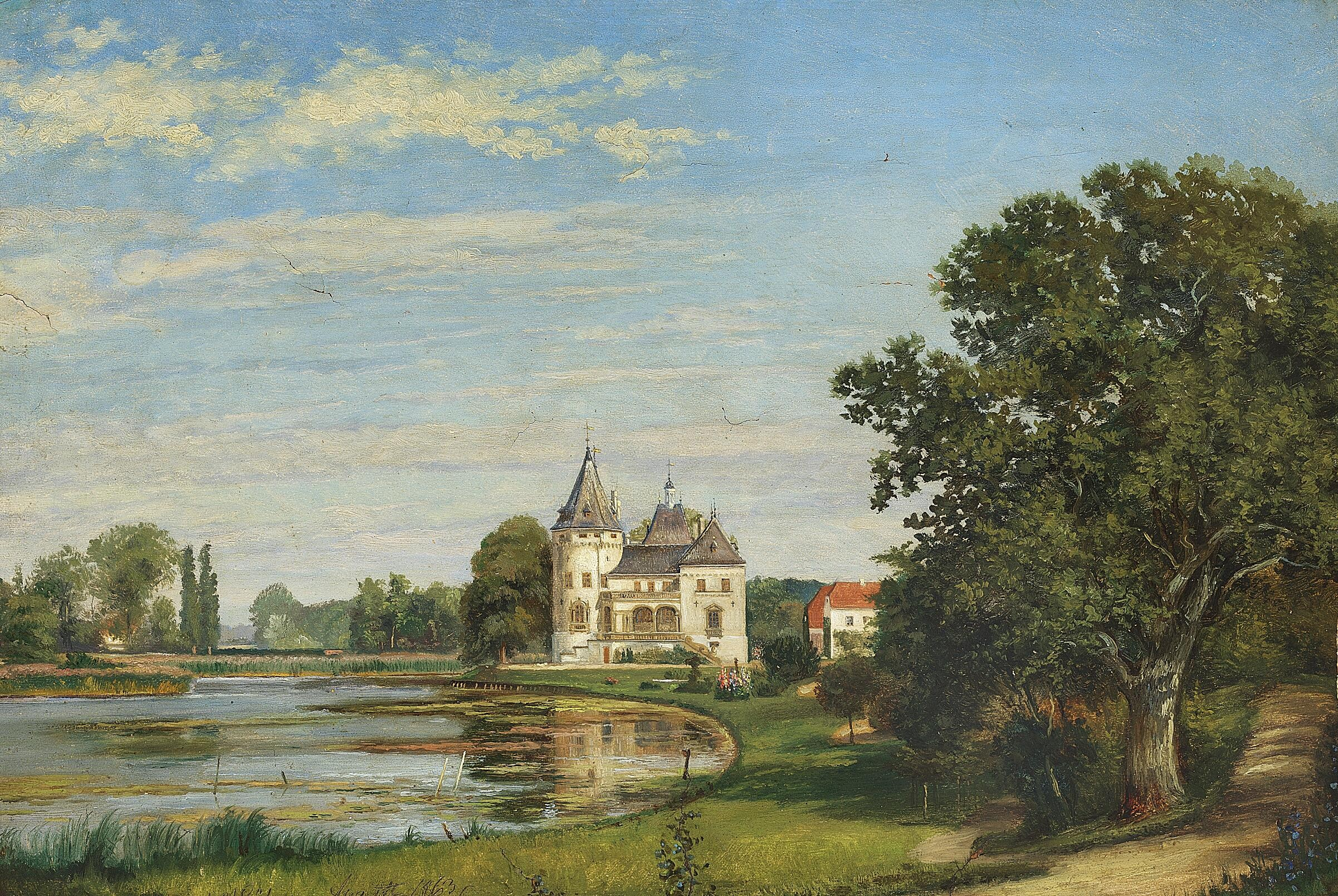
Niels Lützen: Pederstrup, 1863

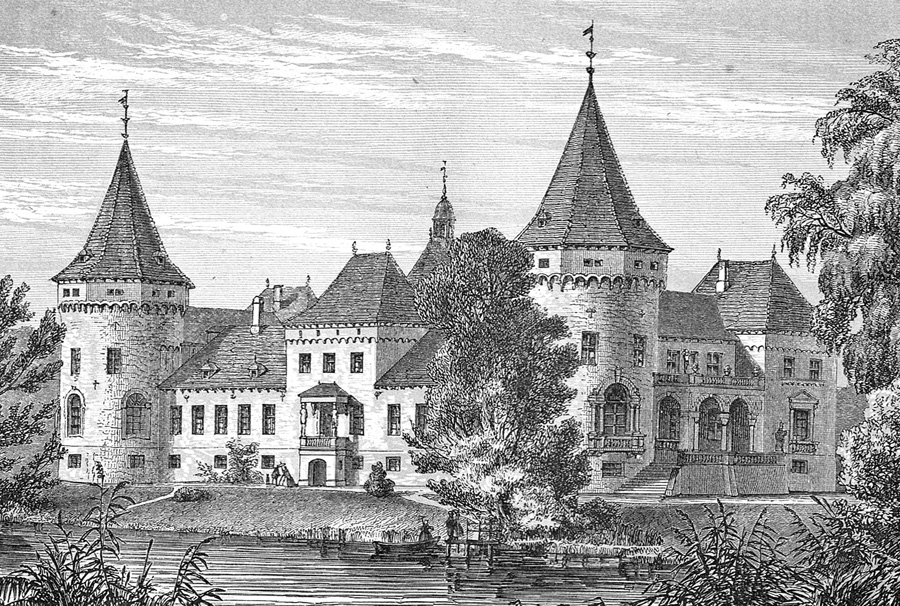
Pederstrup after Meldahl's alterations (1872)

In 1725, the estate was acquired by Count Christian Detlev Reventlow, the half-brother of Anna Sophie Reventlow, Frederick IV's second wife. A countship was created for the Reventlow family in 1729, known as Christianssæde. From 1775, his son Christian Ditlev Frederik Reventlow brought Pederstrup into a period of great prosperity. Between 1813 and 1822, with the assistance of the architect C. F. Hansen, he undertook major extensions in the Neoclassical style. In 1858, his grandson Ferdinand Reventlow commissioned Ferdinand Meldahl to convert the manor into a little French château complete with towers and spires. In 1938, after the Reventlows ran into economic difficulties and had to sell the property, Viggo Sten Møller restored the building to its former Neoclassical appearance in order to serve as a museum.

== Reventlow Museum ==
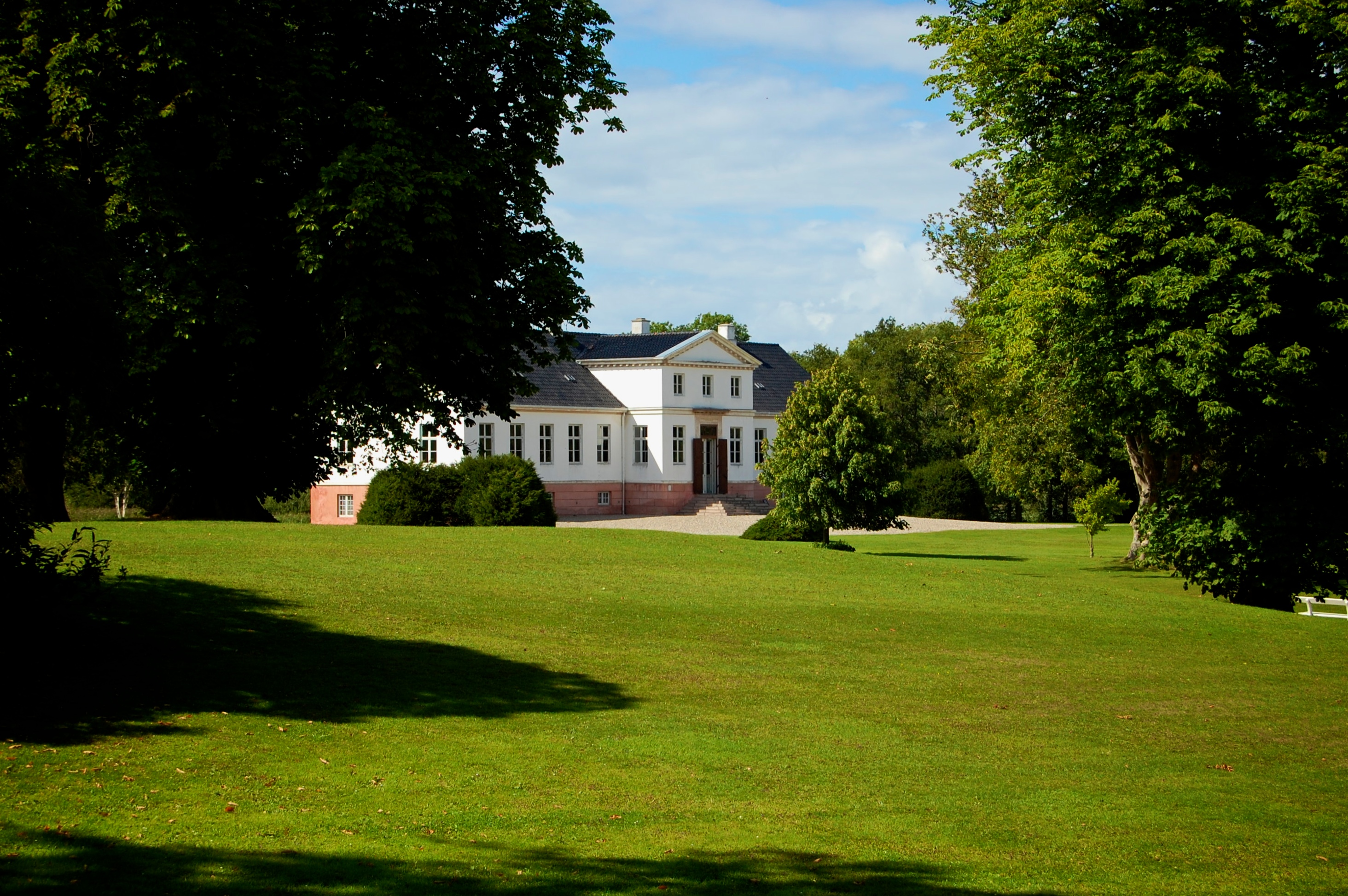
Pederstrup viewed from the park

The museum contains items belonging to C.D.F. Reventlow, his family and friends, especially those concerned with the reforms in Danish society around 1800. There is an important collection of portraits painted by the most influential artists of the day including Jens Juel, C.A. Jensen and C:W: Eckersberg. The house, with period furnishings, also displays many of Reventlow's personal effects including his orders and medals. There is also a 20 ha (49 acres) park which is open throughout the year. The museum itself is open from 11 am to 4 pm on Saturdays and Sundays year round and from Tuesday to Sunday from June to August.

== List of owners ==
- ( -1340) Laurids Jensen
- (1340–1354) Halsted Priory
- (1354–1576) The Crown
- (1576–1587) Lave Venstermand
- (1587–1606) Knud Venstermand
- (1587–1610) Morten Venstermand
- (1606- ) Kirsten Venstermand gift Grubbe
- ( - ) Jørgen Grubbe
- (1610–1616) Anne Galt gift 1.) Venstermand og 2.) Brahe
- (1616–1625) Falk Brahe
- (1625) Holger Rosenkrantz
- (1625) Hans Grabow
- (1625–1634) Joachim Grabow
- (1634–1657) Hans Johan Grabow
- (1657–1666) Hans Wilhelm von Harstall
- (1666–1673) Hans Friderich von Harstall
- (1673–1681) Cai Rumohr
- (1681) Heinrich von Stöcken
- (1681–1684) Boet efter Heinrich von Stöcken
- (1684–1701) Peder von Brandt
- (1701–1725) Henrik von Brandt
- (1725–1738) Christian Ditlev Reventlow
- (1738–1775) Christian Ditlev Reventlow
- (1775–1827) Christian Ditlev Frederik Reventlow
- (1827–1851) Christian Ditlev Reventlow
- (1851–1875) Ferdinand Carl Otto Reventlow
- (1875–1929) Christian Einar Ferdinand Ludvig Eduard Reventlow
- (1929–1935) Boet efter Christian Einar Ferdinand Ludvig Eduard Reventlow
- (1935–1938) L. M. Reventlow
- (1938–2009) Reventlow-Museet, Pederstrup
- (2009–present) Museum Lolland-Falster

== Literature ==
- Erichsen, John; Reventlow-Museet (2004). Fra slottets tid: herregården Pederstrup på Lolland 1858 - 1938. RMP. ISBN 978-87-988849-4-1.
