= Padborg Park =

Motor racing circuit

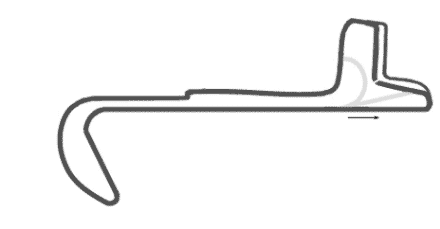
- Full Circuit (2003–present)
- Location: Padborg, Denmark
- Coordinates: 54°52′7″N 9°16′29″E
- Opened: 29 May 2003; 22 years ago
- Major events: Current: Nordic 4 (2017–present); Former: TCR Denmark (2020–2025)
- Website: http://www.padborgpark.dk

Full Circuit (2003–present)
- Length: 2.070 km (1.286 mi)
- Turns: 9
- Race lap record: 0:57.725 ( (Denmark) Mikkel Overgaard Pedersen, Porsche 911 GT3 R, 2021, GT3)

Padborg Park is a motor racing circuit in Padborg, Denmark. The circuit opened in 2003 on the site of an airfield. The circuit has regularly hosted rounds of the Danish Touringcar Championship (DTC), TCR Denmark Touring Car Series, Super GT Denmark and Nordic 4 Championship. It is also used daily for testing and track days.

== Lap records ==
As of May 2022, the fastest official race lap records at the Padborg Park are listed as:

Category	Time	Driver	Vehicle	Event
Full Circuit (2003–present): 2.070 km (1.286 mi)
GT3	0:57.725	Mikkel O. Pedersen	Porsche 911 (991 II) GT3 R	2021 3rd Padborg Danish Endurance Championship round
Formula Ford	0:58.477	Casper Tobias Hansen	Mygale SJ07	2017 1st Padborg Danish F4 round
Formula Renault 2.0	0:58.619	Jimmy Jacobson	Tatuus FR2000	2004 2nd Jyllands-Ringen Formula Renault Scandinavia round
Formula 4	0:59.519	Frederik Vesti	Mygale M14-F4	2017 1st Padborg Danish F4 round
Super 2000	1:01.704	Jan Magnussen	BMW 320si	2008 2nd Padborg DTC round
TCR Touring Car	1:01.786	Kasper Jensen	Honda Civic Type R TCR (FK8)	2022 1st Padborg TCR Denmark round
